= 2020–21 London City Lionesses F.C. season =

London City Lionesses
2020–21 season
- Chairperson: Diane Culligan
- Head coach: Lisa Fallon (until 9 October); Melissa Phillips (from 9 October)
- Stadium: Princes Park, Dartford
- Championship: 6th
- FA Cup: Fourth round
- League Cup: Group stage
- Top goalscorer: League: Atlanta Primus (4); All: Atlanta Primus (4)
Home colours	Away colours

The 2020–21 London City Lionesses F.C. season was the club's second season in existence. The team competed in the FA Women's Championship, the second level of the women's football pyramid, as well as two domestic cup competitions: the FA Cup and the League Cup.

Prior to the start of the season, on 27 May 2020, London City Lionesses announced the appointment of Lisa Fallon as their new manager, taking over from John Bayer who had been in charge on an interim basis since 15 October 2019. Fallon stepped down for family reasons on 9 October 2020 only five games into the season. Fallon's assistant, Melissa Phillips, was initially announced as interim head coach before assuming the role permanently the following week.

== Squad ==
As of 28 March 2021.

Note: Flags indicate national team as defined under FIFA eligibility rules; some limited exceptions apply. Players may hold more than one non-FIFA nationality.

No.	Pos.	Nation	Player
1	GK	ENG	Lucy Thomas
2	DF	ENG	Chantelle Mackie
3	DF	ENG	Leanne Cowan
4	MF	ENG	Poppy Wilson
5	DF	ENG	Hannah Short
6	DF	ENG	Ylenia Priest (co-captain)
7	MF	IRL	Alli Murphy
8	FW	ENG	Freda Ayisi
9	FW	FIN	Juliette Kemppi
10	FW	ENG	Lily Agg
11	MF	ENG	Annie Rossiter
12	DF	NZL	Grace Neville
13	GK	ENG	Hope Smith
14	FW	ENG	Kallie Balfour

No.	Pos.	Nation	Player
15	MF	IRL	Hayley Nolan
16	MF	ENG	Harley Bennett
17	MF	ENG	Lucy Fitzgerald
18	MF	ENG	Ellie Mason (co-captain)
19	FW	POL	Wiktoria Fronc (on loan from West Ham United)
20	FW	ENG	Atlanta Primus
21	MF	ENG	Flo Fyfe
22	FW	ENG	Eden Bailey
23	MF	ENG	Lilly Pursey
30	GK	USA	Shae Yanez
37	MF	KOS	Elizabeta Ejupi
44	GK	ENG	Nina Wilson
—	FW	ENG	Gabriella Ravenscroft

== FA Women's Championship ==
=== Results summary ===
Overall								Home						Away					
Pld	W	D	L	GF	GA	GD	Pts	W	D	L	GF	GA	GD	W	D	L	GF	GA	GD
20	6	6	8	19	19	0	24	4	2	4	12	9	+3	2	4	4	7	10	−3

Last updated: 2 May 2021.
Source: FA WSL

=== Results ===
6 September 2020 1	London City Lionesses	1–4	Sheffield United	Dartford
14:00	Priest (yellow card) 37'; Ayisi 49'	Report	Pennock (yellow card) 34', (goal) 36', 56'; Hartley (yellow card) 44'; Dixon (yellow card) 45'; Wilkinson 58', 64'	Stadium: Princes Park; Attendance: Behind-closed-doors; Referee: Sarah Garratt

12 September 2020 2	Crystal Palace	1–1	London City Lionesses	Bromley
19:00	Waldie 3'; Johnson (yellow card) 76'	Report	Ejupi 34'	Stadium: Hayes Lane; Attendance: Behind-closed-doors; Referee: Chloe Ann Anderson

27 September 2020 3	Durham	1–0	London City Lionesses	Durham
12:00	Hepple 44'; Robson (yellow card) 64'; Salicki (yellow card) 87'	Report	Bennett (yellow card) 23'; Wilson (yellow card) 65'; Agg (yellow card) 69'	Stadium: Maiden Castle; Attendance: Behind-closed-doors; Referee: Lucy Briggs

4 October 2020 4	London City Lionesses	0–1	Lewes	Dartford
14:00	Rossiter (yellow card) 90'	Report	Leek 32' (pen.)	Stadium: Princes Park; Attendance: Behind-closed-doors; Referee: Jamie Pope

11 October 2020 5	London City Lionesses	2–1	London Bees	Dartford
14:00	Murphy 4' (pen.); Bennett 67'; Balfour (yellow card) 72'; Priest (yellow card) 90'	Report	Roberts 63'	Stadium: Princes Park; Attendance: Behind-closed-doors; Referee: Daniel Doyle

18 October 2020 6	Blackburn Rovers	1–0	London City Lionesses	Bamber Bridge
14:00	Walters 30' (pen.); Edwards (yellow card) 45'	Report		Stadium: Irongate; Attendance: Behind-closed-doors; Referee: Jack Nield

1 November 2020 7	London City Lionesses	4–1	Leicester City	Dartford
14:00	Primus 27', 50'; Agg 69'; Mason 81'	Report	Bailey-Gayle 23'	Stadium: Princes Park; Attendance: Behind-closed-doors; Referee: Aaron Farmer

15 November 2020	Charlton Athletic	P–P	London City Lionesses	Crayford
14:00				Stadium: The Oakwood
Note: Postponed due to waterlogged pitch.

6 December 2020 8	London City Lionesses	2–0	Coventry United	Dartford
14:00	Fitzgerald 22'; Agg (yellow card) 46'; Balfour 78'	Report		Stadium: Princes Park; Attendance: Behind-closed-doors; Referee: Jamie Pope

13 December 2020 9	London City Lionesses	0–1	Liverpool	Dartford
14:00	Ejupi (yellow card) 80'	Report	Moore 31'	Stadium: Princes Park; Attendance: Behind-closed-doors; Referee: Georgia Ball

20 December 2020 10	Sheffield United	0–0	London City Lionesses	Chesterfield
14:00		Report	Ejupi (yellow card) 90+1'	Stadium: Technique Stadium; Attendance: Behind-closed-doors; Referee: Robert Massey-Ellis

10 January 2021 11	London City Lionesses	0–0	Crystal Palace	Dartford
14:00	Bennett (yellow card) 53'; Nolan (yellow card) 85'	Report	Stobbs (yellow card) 31' (yellow-red card) 60'; Barton (yellow card) 54'	Stadium: Princes Park; Attendance: Behind-closed-doors; Referee: Lucy Ann Briggs

17 January 2021 12	London Bees	0–0	London City Lionesses	Canons Park
14:00		Report	Bennett (yellow card) 37'	Stadium: The Hive Stadium; Attendance: Behind-closed-doors; Referee: Georgia Ball

24 January 2021 13	London City Lionesses	3–0	Blackburn Rovers	Dartford
14:00	Agg (yellow card) 28'; Ejupi 44', 56'; Primus 45'	Report	Fenton (yellow card) 59'	Stadium: Princes Park; Attendance: Behind-closed-doors; Referee: Simon Finnagan

28 January 2021 14	Charlton Athletic	0–1	London City Lionesses	Crayford
19:45		Report	Balfour 40'	Stadium: The Oakwood; Attendance: Behind-closed-doors; Referee: Stephen Hughes

14 February 2021 15	Lewes	2–3	London City Lionesses	Lewes
14:00	Umotong 11', 82' (pen.)	Report	Primus 23'; Balfour 27'; Agg (yellow card) 63'; Mason (yellow card) 74', (goal) 90+2'; Rossiter (yellow card) 83'	Stadium: The Dripping Pan; Attendance: Behind-closed-doors; Referee: Lou Saunders

28 February 2021 16	London City Lionesses	0–1	Durham	Dartford
12:00	Bennett (yellow card) 89'	Report	Robson (yellow card) 32'; Roberts 37'	Stadium: Princes Park; Attendance: Behind-closed-doors; Referee: Emily Heaslip

7 March 2021 17	Coventry United	1–0	London City Lionesses	Coventry
14:00	Crackle 25'; Toussaint (yellow card) 90'	Report		Stadium: Butts Park Arena; Attendance: Behind-closed-doors

28 March 2021 18	London City Lionesses	0–0	Charlton Athletic	Dartford
16:30	Balfour (yellow card) 65'	Report	Vassell (yellow card) 56'; Sulola (yellow card) 90+3'	Stadium: Princes Park; Attendance: Behind-closed-doors; Referee: Lauren Impey

4 April 2021 19	Leicester City	2–0	London City Lionesses	Quorn
14:00	Tierney (yellow card) 23', (goal) 69'; Flint 75'	Report	Agg (yellow card) 67'	Stadium: Farley Way Stadium; Attendance: Behind-closed-doors; Referee: Georgia Ball

2 May 2021 20	Liverpool	2–2	London City Lionesses	Birkenhead
14:00	Jane 44'; Rodgers 56'	Report	Bennett 68'; Agg 81'	Stadium: Prenton Park; Attendance: Behind-closed-doors; Referee: Lauren Impey

=== League table ===
Pos	Team	Pld	W	D	L	GF	GA	GD	Pts
4	Sheffield United	20	11	5	4	37	15	+22	38
5	Lewes	20	8	4	8	19	22	−3	28
6	London City Lionesses	20	6	6	8	19	19	0	24
7	Crystal Palace	20	5	5	10	27	36	−9	20
8	Charlton Athletic	20	4	7	9	19	29	−10	19

Rules for classification: 1) Points; 2) Goal difference; 3) Number of goals scored

== Women's FA Cup ==
As a member of the top two tiers, London City Lionesses will enter the FA Cup in the fourth round proper. Originally scheduled to take place on 31 January 2021, it was delayed due to COVID-19 restrictions.

16 April 2021 Fourth round	Chelsea	5–0	London City Lionesses	Kingston upon Thames
19:00	Charles 21'; Carter 29'; Leupolz 35'; Spence 56', 79'	Report		Stadium: Kingsmeadow; Attendance: Behind-closed-doors; Referee: Chloe Anderson

== FA Women's League Cup ==
Per the revised format of the League Cup amid the coronavirus pandemic, the group stage was now limited to four teams per group. London City Lionesses were drawn as the only Championship team alongside FA WSL teams Tottenham Hotspur, Chelsea and Arsenal.

7 October 2020 Group stage	Tottenham Hotspur	4–0	London City Lionesses	Canons Park
15:30	Percival 12' Kennedy 29' Ayane 35' Godfrey (yellow card) 70' Addison 82'	Report	Bennett (yellow card) 28'	Stadium: The Hive; Attendance: Behind-closed-doors; Referee: Sarah Garratt

4 November 2020 Group stage	London City Lionesses	0–4	Arsenal	Dartford
19:30		Report	Miedema 22', 28', 41', 54'	Stadium: Princes Park; Attendance: Behind-closed-doors; Referee: Robert Whitton

18 November 2020 Group stage	London City Lionesses	C–C	Chelsea	Dartford
19:30				Stadium: Princes Park
Note: Postponed following three positive COVID-19 tests by London City Lionesses players. Fixture was not fulfilled.

Pos	Team	Pld	W	WPEN	LPEN	L	GF	GA	GD	Pts	Qualification	CHE	ARS	TOT	LCL
1	Chelsea	2	2	0	0	0	6	1	+5	6	Advanced to knock-out stage	—	4–1	2–0	—
2	Arsenal	3	1	1	0	1	7	6	+1	5	Possible knock-out stage based on ranking	—	—	2–2	—
3	Tottenham Hotspur	3	1	0	1	1	6	4	+2	4		—	—	—	4–0
4	London City Lionesses	2	0	0	0	2	0	8	−8	0		C–C (Note: Match originally postponed following three positive COVID-19 tests by London City Lionesses players. An independent tribunal determined the fixture would not be rescheduled as it would have no effect on qualifying.)	0–4	—	—

Source: thefa.com
Rules for classification: 1) Points; 2) Goal difference; 3) Number of goals scored; 4) Number of wins; 5) Head-to-head record

== Squad statistics ==
=== Appearances ===
As of 2 May 2021

Starting appearances are listed first, followed by substitute appearances after the + symbol where applicable.

No.	Pos	Nat	Player	Total		League		FA Cup		League Cup	
No.	Pos	Nat	Player	Apps	Goals	Apps	Goals	Apps	Goals	Apps	Goals
1	GK	(England) ENG	Lucy Thomas	0	0	0	0	0	0	0	0
2	DF	(England) ENG	Chantelle Mackie	9	0	7	0	0	0	2	0
3	DF	(England) ENG	Leanne Cowan	9	0	7+1	0	0	0	0+1	0
4	MF	(England) ENG	Poppy Wilson	14	0	11+2	0	0	0	1	0
5	DF	(England) ENG	Hannah Short	16	0	13+1	0	1	0	0+1	0
6	DF	(England) ENG	Ylenia Priest	10	0	7	0	1	0	1+1	0
7	MF	(Republic of Ireland) IRL	Alli Murphy	21	1	17+1	1	1	0	2	0
8	FW	(England) ENG	Freda Ayisi	9	1	4+5	1	0	0	0	0
9	FW	(Finland) FIN	Juliette Kemppi	21	0	12+7	0	0	0	0+2	0
10	FW	(England) ENG	Lily Agg	20	2	16+2	2	1	0	1	0
11	MF	(England) ENG	Annie Rossiter	16	0	2+11	0	0+1	0	1+1	0
12	DF	(England) ENG	Grace Neville	20	0	17	0	1	0	2	0
13	GK	(England) ENG	Hope Smith	0	0	0	0	0	0	0	0
14	FW	(England) ENG	Kallie Balfour	18	3	9+8	3	0	0	1	0
15	MF	(Republic of Ireland) IRL	Hayley Nolan	21	0	18	0	1	0	1+1	0
16	MF	(England) ENG	Harley Bennett	23	2	20	2	1	0	2	0
17	MF	(England) ENG	Lucy Fitzgerald	20	1	11+6	1	1	0	1+1	0
18	MF	(England) ENG	Ellie Mason	3	2	1+1	2	0	0	1	0
19	FW	(Poland) POL	Wiktoria Fronc	0	0	0	0	0	0	0	0
20	FW	(England) ENG	Atlanta Primus	22	4	18+1	4	1	0	2	0
21	MF	(England) ENG	Flo Fyfe	8	0	2+4	0	1	0	0+1	0
22	FW	(England) ENG	Eden Bailey	0	0	0	0	0	0	0	0
23	MF	(England) ENG	Lilly Pursey	3	0	0+2	0	0	0	1	0
30	GK	(United States) USA	Shae Yanez	23	0	20	0	1	0	2	0
37	MF	(Kosovo) KOS	Elizabeta Ejupi	14	3	8+5	3	0	0	1	0
44	GK	(England) ENG	Nina Wilson	0	0	0	0	0	0	0	0
	FW	(England) ENG	Gabby Ravenscroft	0	0	0	0	0	0	0	0

== Transfers ==
=== Transfers in ===
Date	Position	Nationality	Name	From	Ref.
11 July 2020	MF	(Republic of Ireland)	Alli Murphy	(Iceland) Selfoss	
16 July 2020	GK	(United States)	Shae Yanez	(Spain) Santa Teresa	
9 August 2020	MF	(England)	Lilly Pursey	(England) Chelsea	
28 August 2020	MF	(Republic of Ireland)	Hayley Nolan	(United States) Connecticut Fusion	
4 September 2020	FW	(England)	Atlanta Primus	(United States) Cal State Fullerton Titans	
1 February 2021	GK	(England)	Nina Wilson	(Iceland) Fjarðab/Höttur/Leiknir	

=== Loans in ===
Date	Position	Nationality	Name	From	Until	Ref.
28 March 2021	FW	(Poland)	Wiktoria Fronc	(England) West Ham United	End of season	

=== Transfers out ===
Date	Position	Nationality	Name	To	Ref.
15 April 2020	MF	(England)	Ellie Arnold	(United States) USC Upstate Spartans	
19 June 2020	FW	(Aruba)	Vanessa Susanna	(Italy) Hellas Verona	
19 June 2020	MF	(England)	Charlotte Gurr	(England) Charlton Athletic	
6 September 2020	FW	(England)	Evie Clarke	(England) Hashtag United	
