= 2019–20 London City Lionesses F.C. season =

London City Lionesses
2019–20 season
- Chairperson: Diane Culligan
- Head coach: Chris Phillips (until 15 October); John Bayer (interim, from 15 October)
- Stadium: Princes Park, Dartford
- Championship: 4th
- League Cup: Group stage
- FA Cup: Fourth round
- Top goalscorer: League: Elizabeta Ejupi (4); All: Elizabeta Ejupi (4)
Home colours	Away colours

The 2019–20 London City Lionesses F.C. season was the club's first season in existence following a breakaway from Millwall Lionesses in May 2019. The team competed in the FA Women's Championship, the second level of the women's football pyramid, as well as two domestic cup competitions: the FA Cup and the League Cup.

On 13 March 2020, in line with the FA's response to the coronavirus pandemic, it was announced the season was temporarily suspended until at least 3 April 2020. After further postponements, the season was ultimately ended prematurely on 25 May 2020 with immediate effect. London City Lionesses sat in 4th at the time and retained their position on sporting merit after The FA Board's decision to award places on a points-per-game basis.

== Squad ==
As of 2 February 2020.

Note: Flags indicate national team as defined under FIFA eligibility rules; some limited exceptions apply. Players may hold more than one non-FIFA nationality.

No.	Pos.	Nation	Player
1	GK	ENG	Lucy Thomas
2	DF	ENG	Chantelle Mackie
3	DF	ENG	Leanne Cowan
4	MF	ENG	Poppy Wilson
5	DF	ENG	Hannah Short
6	DF	ENG	Ylenia Priest
7	MF	KOS	Elizabeta Ejupi
8	FW	ENG	Freda Ayisi
9	FW	ENG	Gabby Ravenscroft
10	FW	FIN	Juliette Kemppi
11	FW	ENG	Evie Clarke
12	DF	ENG	Grace Neville

No.	Pos.	Nation	Player
14	FW	ENG	Kallie Balfour
15	DF	ENG	Vyan Sampson (on loan from West Ham United)
16	MF	ENG	Harley Bennett
17	MF	ENG	Lucy Fitzgerald
18	MF	ENG	Ellie Mason
19	FW	ENG	Lily Agg
20	MF	ENG	Annie Rossiter
21	MF	ENG	Flo Fyfe
22	FW	ENG	Eden Bailey
24	MF	ENG	Ellie Arnold
25	FW	ARU	Vanessa Susanna
26	MF	ENG	Charlotte Gurr

== FA Women's Championship ==
=== Results summary ===
Overall								Home						Away					
Pld	W	D	L	GF	GA	GD	Pts	W	D	L	GF	GA	GD	W	D	L	GF	GA	GD
15	8	2	5	25	24	+1	26	3	1	4	13	17	−4	5	1	1	12	7	+5

Last updated: 23 February 2020.
Source: FA WSL

=== Matches ===
18 August 2019 1	London Bees	0–2	London City Lionesses	Canons Park
		Report	Neville 8'; Fitzgerald 52'	Stadium: The Hive Stadium; Attendance: 412; Referee: Aaron Farmer

25 August 2019 2	London City Lionesses	2–3	Aston Villa	Dartford
	Ejupi 29', 50'	Report	West 10'; Elisha N'Dow (yellow card) 61'; Haigh 65'; Hayles 67'	Stadium: Princes Park

8 September 2019 3	London City Lionesses	3–1	Leicester City	Dartford
	Priest 19'; Cowan 48'; Clarke 85'	Report	Dugmore (yellow card) 77'; Smith 90+2'	Stadium: Princes Park; Attendance: 224; Referee: Isaac Searle

15 September 2019 4	Charlton Athletic	0–2	London City Lionesses	Crayford
	Maple (yellow card) 20'; Clifford (yellow card) 56'; Devlin (yellow card) 78' (yellow-red card) 90'	Report	Fyfe 57'; Clarke 62'; Wilson (yellow card) 65'; Fitzgerald (yellow card) 90'	Stadium: The Oakwood; Attendance: 274; Referee: Louise Saunders

29 September 2019 5	London City Lionesses	0–6	Durham	Dartford
	Ayisi (yellow card) 77'; Bennett (red card) 89'	Report	Hepple 26' (pen.), 82'; Holmes (yellow card) 50'; Achterhof 58', 62'; Sharpe 70'; Robertson 89'	Stadium: Princes Park; Attendance: 171; Referee: Ben Atkinson

13 October 2019 6	Coventry United	1–2	London City Lionesses	Coventry
	Dermody 4'; Morgan (yellow card) 61'; Merrick (yellow card) 66'; Bartle (yellow card) 89'	Report	Priest 36'; Clarke (yellow card) 86' (yellow-red card) 90'; Balfour 88'	Stadium: Butts Park Arena; Attendance: 469; Referee: Lauren Impey

27 October 2019 7	London City Lionesses	3–0	Lewes	Dartford
	Mason 38'; Ejupi 72'; Short 85'	Report	Savva (yellow card) 30'; Hayes (yellow card) 42'	Stadium: Princes Park; Attendance: 240; Referee: Melissa Burgin

17 November 2019 8	Crystal Palace	1–2	London City Lionesses	Bromley
	Rutherford (yellow card) 38'; Goddard 65'	Report	Bennett (yellow card) 38'; Susanna 69', (yellow card) 75'; Ejupi 86'	Stadium: Hayes Lane; Attendance: 389; Referee: Magdalena Golba

1 December 2019 9	London City Lionesses	1–2	Sheffield United	Dartford
	Sampson 56'; Bennett (yellow card) 65'	Report	Wilkinson 8'; Fergusson 75'	Stadium: Princes Park; Referee: Aji Ajibola

8 December 2020 10	Blackburn Rovers	1–2	London City Lionesses	Bamber Bridge
	Jordan 22', (yellow card) 87'; Fenton (yellow card) 60'	Report	Ayisi 23'; Fyfe 80'	Stadium: Irongate; Referee: Emily Carney

15 December 2019 11	Aston Villa	3–1	London City Lionesses	Boldmere
	Follis 11'; Syme 26'; Ewers 75'	Report	Mason 6'	Stadium: Trevor Brown Memorial Ground; Attendance: 343; Referee: Melissa Burgin

12 January 2020 12	London City Lionesses	0–2	London Bees	Dartford
	Mackie (yellow card) 74'	Report	Wilson 10'; Hazard 19'; Will (yellow card) 80'	Stadium: Princes Park; Attendance: 189; Referee: Jade Wardle

19 January 2020 13	Durham	1–1	London City Lionesses	Durham
	Priest 22' (o.g.); Robson (yellow card) 70'	Report	Balfour 75'	Stadium: New Ferens Park; Attendance: 376; Referee: Lucy Briggs

2 February 2020 14	London City Lionesses	3–2	Coventry United	Dartford
	Susanna 31', 90+2'; Rossiter 55'	Report	Worts 5'; O'Brien 13'	Stadium: Princes Park

9 February 2020	Lewes	P–P	London City Lionesses	Lewes
				Stadium: The Dripping Pan
Note: All Championship games postponed due to adverse weather conditions

23 February 2020 15	London City Lionesses	1–1	Crystal Palace	Dartford
	Rossiter 1', (yellow card) 85'; Bennett (yellow card) 90'	Report	Hurley (yellow card) 17'; Goddard 40'; Johnson (yellow card) 58'	Stadium: Princes Park; Attendance: 22; Referee: Lauren Impey

29 March 2020 16	Sheffield United	Cancelled	London City Lionesses	Sheffield
				Stadium: Sheffield Olympic Legacy Stadium
Note: Cancelled due to coronavirus pandemic

5 April 2020 17	London City Lionesses	Cancelled	Blackburn Rovers	Dartford
				Stadium: Princes Park
Note: Cancelled due to coronavirus pandemic

19 April 2020 18	Leicester City	Cancelled	London City Lionesses	Quorn
				Stadium: Farley Way Stadium
Note: Cancelled due to coronavirus pandemic

26 April 2020 19	London City Lionesses	Cancelled	Charlton Athletic	Dartford
				Stadium: Princes Park
Note: Cancelled due to coronavirus pandemic

TBD 20	Lewes	Cancelled	London City Lionesses	Lewes
				Stadium: The Dripping Pan
Note: Rescheduled from 9 February 2020. Cancelled due to coronavirus pandemic

=== League table ===
Pos	Team	Pld	W	D	L	GF	GA	GD	Pts	PPG
2	Sheffield United	14	11	1	2	46	16	+30	34	2.43
3	Durham	14	10	2	2	33	10	+23	32	2.29
4	London City Lionesses	15	8	2	5	25	24	+1	26	1.73
5	London Bees	12	4	3	5	16	19	−3	15	1.25
6	Leicester City	15	4	3	8	22	35	−13	15	1.00

Rules for classification: 1) Points; 2) Goal difference; 3) Number of goals scored

== Women's FA Cup ==
As a member of the top two tiers, London City Lionesses entered the FA Cup in the fourth round, losing to FA WSL team Reading in their opening fixture.

26 January 2020 Fourth round	London City Lionesses	0–5	Reading	Dartford
	Mason (yellow card) 10'; Ayisi (yellow card) 22'	Report	Williams 13', 78' (pen.); Potter 30'; Pacheco 44'; Utland 58'	Stadium: Princes Park

== FA Women's League Cup ==
=== Group stage ===
Pos	Team	Pld	W	WPEN	LPEN	L	GF	GA	GD	Pts	Qualification	ARS	BHA	BRI	LON	CHA	LCL
1	Arsenal	5	4	0	1	0	25	0	+25	13	Advance to Knock-out stage	—	—	7–0	9–0	4–0	—
2	Brighton & Hove Albion	5	3	1	0	1	13	4	+9	11	Advance to Knock-out stage	0–0	—	1–2	—	—	—
3	Bristol City	5	3	0	1	1	11	11	0	10		—	—	—	3–0	—	1–1
4	London Bees	5	1	1	0	3	3	17	−14	5		—	0–5	—	—	0–0	—
5	Charlton Athletic	5	1	0	1	3	3	12	−9	4		—	0–3	2–5	—	—	1–0
6	London City Lionesses	5	0	1	0	4	3	14	−11	2		0–5	2–4	—	0–3	—	—

Source: playmakerstats.com
Rules for classification: 1) Points; 2) Goal difference; 3) Number of goals scored; 4) Number of wins; 5) Head-to-head record

22 September 2019 Group stage	London City Lionesses	0–5	Arsenal	Dartford
		Report	Mead 28', 57', 79'; Roord 33'; Mitchell 54'	Stadium: Princes Park; Attendance: 577; Referee: Jacob Miles

20 October 2019 Group stage	London City Lionesses	0–3	London Bees	Dartford
	Priest (yellow card) 73'	Report	Horwood 26'; Will 42'; Pickett 66'	Stadium: Princes Park; Attendance: 209; Referee: Jade Wardle

3 November 2019 Group stage	Bristol City	1–1 (3–4 p)	London City Lionesses	Filton
	Wellings 65'	Report	Cowan 17'; Bennett (yellow card) 78'	Stadium: Stoke Gifford Stadium; Attendance: 317; Referee: Rick Hulme
	Penalties
	Baggaley (penalty scored); Wellings (penalty scored); Chance (penalty missed); Salmon (penalty scored); Humphrey (penalty missed)		(penalty missed) Kemppi; (penalty scored) Susanna; (penalty scored) Fitzgerald; (penalty scored) Ejupi; (penalty scored) Wilson

20 November 2019 Group stage	Charlton Athletic	1–0	London City Lionesses	Crayford
	Clifford (yellow card) 78'; Estcourt 80'	Report		Stadium: The Oakwood; Attendance: 226; Referee: Chloe-Ann Anderson

11 December 2019 Group stage	London City Lionesses	2–4	Brighton & Hove Albion	Dartford
	Clarke 47' (pen.); Mason 89'	Report	Lundorf 18'; Umotong 57'; Bennett 68' (o.g.); Simpkins 79'	Stadium: Princes Park; Attendance: 43; Referee: Abigail Byrne

== Squad statistics ==
=== Appearances ===
Starting appearances are listed first, followed by substitute appearances after the + symbol where applicable.

No.	Pos	Nat	Player	Total		League		FA Cup		League Cup	
No.	Pos	Nat	Player	Apps	Goals	Apps	Goals	Apps	Goals	Apps	Goals
1	GK	(England) ENG	Lucy Thomas	21	0	15	0	1	0	5	0
2	DF	(England) ENG	Chantelle Mackie	10	0	3+3	0	0+1	0	2+1	0
3	DF	(England) ENG	Leanne Cowan	12	2	8+1	1	0	0	2+1	1
4	MF	(England) ENG	Poppy Wilson	17	0	13	0	1	0	2+1	0
5	DF	(England) ENG	Hannah Short	16	1	13	1	1	0	2	0
6	DF	(England) ENG	Ylenia Priest	15	2	9	2	1	0	5	0
7	MF	(Kosovo) KOS	Elizabeta Ejupi	15	4	6+4	4	1	0	3+1	0
8	FW	(England) ENG	Freda Ayisi	15	1	5+5	1	1	0	3+1	0
9	FW	(England) ENG	Gabby Ravenscroft	1	0	0+1	0	0	0	0	0
10	FW	(Finland) FIN	Juliette Kemppi	19	0	13+2	0	0	0	2+2	0
11	FW	(England) ENG	Evie Clarke	12	3	5+6	2	0	0	1	1
12	DF	(England) ENG	Grace Neville	10	1	4+2	1	1	0	3	0
14	FW	(England) ENG	Kallie Balfour	11	2	1+5	2	1	0	3+1	0
15	DF	(England) ENG	Vyan Sampson	13	1	10	1	1	0	2	0
16	MF	(England) ENG	Harley Bennett	17	0	11+1	0	0	0	5	0
17	MF	(England) ENG	Lucy Fitzgerald	19	1	13+1	1	1	0	4	0
18	MF	(England) ENG	Ellie Mason	20	3	15	2	1	0	2+2	1
19	FW	(England) ENG	Lily Agg	2	0	0+2	0	0	0	0	0
20	MF	(England) ENG	Annie Rossiter	11	2	3+4	2	0	0	3+1	0
21	MF	(England) ENG	Flo Fyfe	17	2	9+3	2	0+1	0	2+2	0
22	FW	(England) ENG	Eden Bailey	0	0	0	0	0	0	0	0
24	MF	(England) ENG	Ellie Arnold	0	0	0	0	0	0	0	0
25	FW	(Aruba) ARU	Vanessa Susanna	17	3	6+5	3	0+1	0	4+1	0
26	MF	(England) ENG	Charlotte Gurr	2	0	1	0	0	0	0+1	0
Players who appeared for London City Lionesses but left during the season:
23	MF	(England) ENG	Amber Gaylor	0	0	0	0	0	0	0	0

=== Goalscorers ===
Rank	No.	Pos.	Name	Championship	FA Cup	League Cup	Total
1	7	MF	(Kosovo) Elizabeta Ejupi	4	0	0	4
2	11	FW	(England) Evie Clarke	2	0	1	3
2	18	MF	(England) Ellie Mason	2	0	1	3
2	25	FW	(Aruba) Vanessa Susanna	3	0	0	3
5	3	DF	(England) Leanne Cowan	1	0	1	2
5	6	DF	(England) Ylenia Priest	2	0	0	2
5	14	FW	(England) Kallie Balfour	2	0	0	2
5	20	MF	(England) Annie Rossiter	2	0	0	2
5	21	MF	(England) Flo Fyfe	2	0	0	2
10	5	DF	(England) Hannah Short	1	0	0	1
10	8	FW	(England) Freda Ayisi	1	0	0	1
10	12	DF	(England) Grace Nevillie	1	0	0	1
10	15	DF	(England) Vyan Sampson	1	0	0	1
10	17	MF	(England) Lucy Fitzgerald	1	0	0	1
Total				25	0	3	28

== Transfers ==
=== Transfers in ===
Date	Position	Nationality	Name	From	Ref.
18 August 2019	GK	(England)	Lucy Thomas	(England) Oxford United	
18 August 2019	DF	(England)	Chantelle Mackie	(England) Millwall Lionesses	
18 August 2019	DF	(England)	Leanne Cowan	(England) Millwall Lionesses	
18 August 2019	MF	(England)	Poppy Wilson	(England) Bristol City	
18 August 2019	DF	(England)	Hannah Short	(England) Yeovil Town	
18 August 2019	DF	(England)	Ylenia Priest	(England) Millwall Lionesses	
18 August 2019	MF	(Kosovo)	Elizabeta Ejupi	(England) Charlton Athletic	
18 August 2019	FW	(England)	Freda Ayisi	(England) Leicester City	
18 August 2019	FW	(England)	Gabby Ravenscroft	(England) Millwall Lionesses	
18 August 2019	FW	(Finland)	Juliette Kemppi	(England) Bristol City	
18 August 2019	FW	(England)	Evie Clarke	(England) Millwall Lionesses	
18 August 2019	DF	(England)	Grace Neville	(England) Millwall Lionesses	
18 August 2019	FW	(England)	Kallie Balfour	(England) Crystal Palace	
18 August 2019	MF	(England)	Harley Bennett	(England) Charlton Athletic	
18 August 2019	MF	(England)	Lucy Fitzgerald	(England) Millwall Lionesses	
18 August 2019	MF	(England)	Ellie Mason	(England) Yeovil Town	
18 August 2019	FW	(England)	Lily Agg	(England) Charlton Athletic	
18 August 2019	MF	(England)	Annie Rossiter	(England) Millwall Lionesses	
18 August 2019	MF	(England)	Flo Fyfe	(England) Oxford United	
18 August 2019	FW	(England)	Eden Bailey	(England) Millwall Lionesses	
18 August 2019	MF	(England)	Amber Gaylor	(England) Yeovil Town	
18 August 2019	MF	(England)	Ellie Arnold	(England) Chelsea	
18 August 2019	FW	(Aruba)	Vanessa Susanna	(Belgium) Anderlecht	
18 August 2019	MF	(England)	Charlotte Gurr	(England) Charlton Athletic	

=== Loans in ===
Date	Position	Nationality	Name	From	Until	Ref.
28 August 2019	DF	(England)	Vyan Sampson	(England) West Ham United	End of season	

=== Transfers out ===
Date	Position	Nationality	Name	To	Ref.
17 January 2020	MF	(England)	Amber Gaylor	(England) Crystal Palace	
