= Leanne Cowan =

English women's professional footballer

Personal information
- Full name: Leanne Cowan
- Date of birth: 1 February 1996 (age 30)
- Place of birth: London, England
- Position: Defender

Team information
- Current team: Sheffield United

Youth career
- -2014: Millwall Lionesses

Senior career*
Years	Team	Apps	(Gls)
2014-2019	Millwall Lionesses	25*	(2)
2019-2021	London City Lionesses	17	(1)
2021-2023	Crystal Palace	15	(0)
2023-2024	London City Lionesses	7	(1)
2024-	Sheffield United	34	(0)
- * Club domestic league appearances and goals as of 1 February 2026. Appearance data up until 2017 may be incomplete.

Leanne Cowan (born 1 February 1996) is an English professional footballer who plays as a defender for WSL 2 club Sheffield United.

Cowan played youth football with Millwall Lionesses, making her senior debut in the 2014 FA WSL 2, before becoming a first-team regular in the 2015 FA WSL 2.

Cowan stayed with Millwall Lionesses until she joined their breakaway team London City Lionesses in 2019. She has subsequently played for Crystal Palace and spent a second spell at London City Lionesses, before joining Sheffield United in 2024.

== Early life ==
Cowan was born in London, where she began playing football with boys in the playground, and with her older brothers after school. She attended weekly Brazilian soccer schools before a successful trial with Millwall under 10's in 2005.

== Club career ==
=== Millwall Lionesses ===
Cowan made her senior breakthrough for Millwall Lionesses during the 2014 FA WSL 2 season, after spending nine years developing in Millwall's Centre of Excellence. She scored her first senior goal during her full home debut at The Den. Playing mostly at full-back, Cowan established herself as a first-team regular throughout the 2015 and 2016 WSL 2 seasons.

Cowan began the 2017-18 season playing at wing-back, and scored twice in the first three games of the season. The first was during the opening game against Watford F.C., where she scored the second goal in a 3–1 win for her side. Her second was an equaliser against Brighton & Hove Albion, a game which eventually ended in a 4–3 win for Millwall. She went on to play 14 of 18 league games for Millwall, who ended the season in 3rd - their best finish since the formation of the WSL 2.

Ahead of the 2018-19 season, Cowan re-signed for Millwall Lionesses and was appointed as their new captain. She only managed 11 league appearances through the season due to injury, tearing her ankle ligaments in September and injuring her hip flexor in the February FA Cup clash against Liverpool.

=== London City Lionesses ===
London City Lionesses were formed in May 2019, as an independent breakaway club of Millwall Lionesses, and Cowan became part of their inaugural squad ahead of the 2019-20 season. She provided an assist for Lucy Fitzgerald's goal in the opening game of the season, which the Lionesses won 2–0 against London Bees. Cowan scored in the third game of the season, netting the second in a 3–1 win over Leicester City. She scored her second goal of the season in the League Cup against WSL side Bristol City, in a game which London City went on to win on penalties.

Cowan continued to struggle with injuries through the 2019-20 and 2020-21 campaigns, making 17 league appearances across both seasons. She was released by London City in May 2021.

=== Crystal Palace ===
Cowan signed for FA Women's Championship club Crystal Palace on a free transfer in July 2021, ahead of the 2021-22 season. She established herself as a regular starter, making 15 appearances before missing the last two months of the season due to injury.

Cowan was forced to miss the entirety of the 2022-23 season due to injury, and left Palace on a free after the season concluded.

=== London City Lionesses ===
Cowan rejoined London City Lionesses in November 2023, signing a 1-year contract for the 2023–24 Women's Championship season. She made 10 appearances across different competitions, including a 15-minute substitute appearance in London City's League Cup quarter-final loss against Arsenal.

=== Sheffield United ===
Ahead of the 2024-25 season, Cowan signed for Women's Championship side Sheffield United on a free transfer. She appeared in every league game during her debut season, playing both in wing-back roles and as part of a back three. Sheffield United finished last in the league, but were reprieved from relegation after Blackburn Rovers were unable to meet the minimum standards for the next season, and were relegated themselves.

Cowan re-signed with the club ahead of the 2025-26 WSL 2 season. She started every game for the first half of the season, usually playing as the right centre-back in a back three.,

== Personal life ==
Cowan played both football and basketball in school, and ended up having to pick between them as a teenager. Cowan worked as a bartender whilst playing for Millwall Lionesses and worked "three or four" other part-time jobs, sometimes consecutively, to support herself until she was able to turn full-time professional.

== Career statistics ==
=== Club ===
As of match played 1 February 2026. Statistics may be incomplete due to lack of historical WSL 2 and Women's FA Cup data.

Appearances and goals by club, season and competition
Club	Season	League			FA Cup		League Cup		Total	
Club	Season	Division	Apps	Goals	Apps	Goals	Apps	Goals	Apps	Goals
Millwall Lionesses	2015	WSL 2	0	0	0	0	4	0	4	0
Millwall Lionesses	2016	WSL 2	0	0	0	0	1	0	1	0
Millwall Lionesses	2017-18	WSL 2	14	2	0	0	3	0	17	2
Millwall Lionesses	2018-19	FA Women's Championship	11	0	0	0	3	0	14	0
Millwall Lionesses	Total		25	2	0	0	11	0	36	2
London City Lionesses	2019–20	FA Women's Championship	9	1	0	0	3	1	12	2
London City Lionesses	2020-21	FA Women's Championship	8	0	0	0	1	0	9	0
London City Lionesses	Total		17	1	0	0	4	1	21	2
Crystal Palace	2021–22	FA Women's Championship	15	0	0	0	2	0	17	0
Crystal Palace	2022–23	Women's Championship	0	0	0	0	0	0	0	0
Crystal Palace	Total		15	0	0	0	2	0	17	0
London City Lionesses	2023–24	Women's Championship	7	1	1	0	2	0	10	1
Sheffield United	2024–25	Women's Championship	20	0	1	0	2	0	23	0
Sheffield United	2025–26	WSL 2	14	0	2	0	3	0	19	0
Sheffield United	Total		34	0	3	0	5	0	42	0
Career total			98	4	4	0	24	1	126	5
