= 2015 FA WSL 2 =

FA WSL 2
- Season: 2015
- Champions: Reading
- Matches: 90
- Goals: 324 (3.6 per match)
- Top goalscorer: Courtney Sweetman-Kirk (20 goals)
- Biggest home win: Reading 8–0 London Bees (22 August 2015)
- Biggest away win: London Bees 0–7 Reading (29 March 2015)
- Highest scoring: Yeovil Town 7–1 Watford (26 July 2015); Reading 8–0 London Bees (22 August 2015); London Bees 1–7 Everton (4 October 2015); Everton 5–3 Oxford United (18 October 2015)
- Longest winning run: 6 matches Doncaster Rovers Belles
- Longest unbeaten run: 14 matches Reading
- Longest winless run: 12 matches Watford
- Longest losing run: 11 matches Watford
- Average attendance: 341
- All statistics correct as of 19 October 2015.

The 2015 FA WSL 2 season second season of the FA WSL 2. As part of a two-year expansion plan, the WSL 1 will increase to nine teams for the 2016 season. By the end of the 2015 season two teams (Reading and Doncaster Rovers Belles) were promoted from WSL 2 to WSL 1 and only one team (Bristol Academy) relegated to WSL 2, with one team being promoted from Premier League to WSL 2.

Everton were relegated from WSL 1 last season.

Reading won the WSL 2 Title after to a 3–2 win over Aston Villa on the final day. Doncaster Rovers Belles were promoted as well after finishing behind Reading on goal difference.

== Teams ==
Locations of the 2015 WSL 2 teams

Team	Location	Ground	Capacity	2014 FA WSL 2 finish
Aston Villa	Sutton Coldfield	Central Ground, Coles Lane	2,000	4th
Doncaster Rovers Belles	Doncaster	Keepmoat Stadium	15,231	2nd
Durham	Durham	New Ferens Park	3,000	6th
Everton	Widnes	Halton Stadium	13,350	8th (WSL 1)
London Bees	Canons Park	The Hive Stadium	5,176 (3,434 seated)	10th
Millwall Lionesses	London	The Den	20,146	8th
Oxford United	Abingdon	The Armadillo Stadium	2,000	9th
Reading	Farnborough	The Rushmoor Community Stadium	7,000	3rd
Watford	Berkhamsted	Broadwater	2,000	7th
Yeovil Town	Sherborne	Raleigh Grove	1,500	5th

=== Table ===
Pos	Team	Pld	W	D	L	GF	GA	GD	Pts	Promotion
1	Reading (C)	18	14	3	1	61	15	+46	45	Promotion to FA WSL 1
2	Doncaster Rovers Belles	18	14	3	1	57	15	+42	45	Promotion to FA WSL 1
3	Everton	18	8	7	3	43	24	+19	31	
4	Yeovil Town	18	9	4	5	36	23	+13	31	
5	Aston Villa	18	7	4	7	29	28	+1	25	
6	Oxford United	18	7	3	8	26	40	−14	24	
7	Durham	18	6	2	10	24	32	−8	20	
8	London Bees	18	3	4	11	19	53	−34	13	
9	Millwall Lionesses	18	2	6	10	17	39	−22	12	
10	Watford	18	1	2	15	12	55	−43	5	

Updated to match(es) played on 18 October 2015. Source: FA WSL
Rules for classification: 1) Points; 2) Goal difference; 3) Number of goals scored
(C) Champions

=== Results ===
Home \ Away	AST	DON	DUR	EVE	LON	MIL	OXF	REA	WAT	YEO
Aston Villa		0–5	0–1	1–2	2–1	2–1	2–2	2–3	0–1	2–1
Doncaster Rovers Belles	2–1		3–0	3–3	5–1	4–0	3–0	0–3	5–0	2–1
Durham	1–4	0–2		1–6	4–1	2–3	3–0	0–5	4–0	0–1
Everton	1–1	1–1	1–1		2–2	4–1	5–3	0–2	3–0	0–1
London Bees	2–1	1–2	0–4	1–7		2–1	1–2	0–7	4–0	2–2
Millwall Lionesses	1–2	0–5	0–0	1–1	0–0		2–3	0–4	3–2	2–2
Oxford United	0–2	2–5	1–0	2–3	2–1	2–2		0–4	1–0	0–3
Reading	1–1	2–2	3–0	2–1	8–0	3–0	2–2		3–0	2–4
Watford	1–4	0–5	1–3	1–3	0–0	0–0	2–3	1–3		2–4
Yeovil Town	2–2	0–3	1–0	0–0	4–0	1–0	0–1	2–4	7–1	

Updated to match(es) played on 18 October 2015. Source: FA WSL
Legend: Blue = home team win; Yellow = draw; Red = away team win.

=== Top goalscorers ===
As of 19 October 2015

Rank	Player	Team	Goals
1	(England) Courtney Sweetman-Kirk	Doncaster Rovers Belles	20
2	Bethany England	Doncaster Rovers Belles	13
3	(England) Emma Follis	Reading	12
4	(England) Fran Kirby	Reading	11
4	(England) Sue Smith	Doncaster Rovers Belles	11
6	(Wales) Helen Ward	Reading	8
7	(England) Lauren Bruton	Reading	7
7	(England) Kayleigh Hines	Oxford United	7
7	(England) Danielle Turner	Everton	7
7	(England) Katie Wilkinson	Aston Villa	7
7	(England) Corinne Yorston	Yeovil Town	7
