= 2016 FA WSL 2 =

FA WSL 2
- Season: 2016
- Champions: Yeovil Town
- Promoted: Bristol City; Yeovil Town
- Matches: 90
- Goals: 279 (3.1 per match)
- Top goalscorer: Iniabasi Umotong & Jo Wilson (13 goals)
- Biggest home win: Yeovil Town 5–0 Watford (1 May 2016)
- Biggest away win: Watford 0–5 London Bees (16 May 2016)
- Highest scoring: Oxford United 3–5 Millwall Lionesses (24 March 2016)
- Average attendance: 443

The 2016 FA WSL 2 was the third edition of the FA WSL 2 since it was formed in 2014. The WSL 2 included one team promoted from the FA Women's Premier League for the first time.

Sheffield became the first team to be promoted to the WSL 2 from the FA Women's Premier League.

Yeovil Town and Bristol City were both promoted to the WSL 1 at the end of the season. Yeovil Town won the WSL 2 on goal difference after defeating Sheffield 3-0 on the final day.

== Teams ==
Locations of the 2016 WSL 2 teams

Bristol Academy was renamed Bristol City before the season.

Team	Location	Ground	Capacity	2015 season
Aston Villa	Sutton Coldfield	Central Ground, Coles Lane	2,000	5th
Bristol City	Filton	Stoke Gifford Stadium	1,500	8th, WSL 1
Durham	Durham	New Ferens Park	3,000	7th
Everton	Widnes	Halton Stadium	13,350	3rd
London Bees	Canons Park	The Hive Stadium	5,176	8th
Millwall Lionesses	London	The Den	20,146	9th
Oxford United	Abingdon	Northcourt Road	2,000	6th
Sheffield	Dronfield	Coach and Horses	2,000	1st, WPL
Watford	Berkhamsted	Broadwater	2,000	10th
Yeovil Town	Yeovil	Huish Park	9,565	4th

=== Table ===
Pos	Team	Pld	W	D	L	GF	GA	GD	Pts	Promotion
1	Yeovil Town (C)	18	12	3	3	41	16	+25	39	Promotion to FA WSL 1
2	Bristol City	18	12	3	3	37	16	+21	39	Promotion to FA WSL 1
3	Everton	18	10	4	4	35	18	+17	34	
4	Durham	18	10	3	5	30	19	+11	33	
5	Sheffield	18	7	5	6	25	18	+7	26	
6	Aston Villa	18	7	3	8	26	27	−1	24	
7	London Bees	18	6	4	8	28	39	−11	22	
8	Millwall Lionesses	18	3	7	8	24	31	−7	16	
9	Oxford United	18	4	1	13	20	42	−22	13	
10	Watford	18	2	1	15	13	53	−40	7	

Source: FA WSL
Rules for classification: 1) Points; 2) Goal difference; 3) Number of goals scored
(C) Champions

=== Results ===
Home \ Away	AST	BRI	DUR	EVE	LON	MIL	OXF	SHE	WAT	YEO
Aston Villa		2–2	2–0	0–2	1–1	3–1	2–1	1–2	4–0	0–2
Bristol City	2–0		1–0	0–1	3–0	2–1	4–1	0–0	4–1	3–2
Durham	3–0	0–0		1–3	2–0	2–1	2–1	1–0	3–0	0–2
Everton	2–1	2–3	1–1		5–1	1–1	3–0	1–1	3–0	3–0
London Bees	2–1	0–3	2–2	3–4		2–1	3–1	0–5	2–2	0–2
Millwall Lionesses	2–2	1–2	0–1	2–2	1–1		0–3	1–1	2–1	0–4
Oxford United	0–1	0–5	1–5	0–1	4–2	3–5		1–0	2–0	2–2
Sheffield	1–2	3–1	0–1	1–0	0–1	2–2	2–1		3–0	1–1
Watford	0–2	0–2	1–6	2–1	0–5	1–2	3–2	1–3		1–2
Yeovil Town	4–2	2–0	4–0	1–0	2–3	1–1	2–0	3–0	5–0	

Updated to match(es) played on 16 January 2017. Source: FA WSL
Legend: Blue = home team win; Yellow = draw; Red = away team win.
- The match Millwall Lionesses vs Oxford United was initially postponed because Millwall's stadium, The Den, was being used for a men's game. The FA WSL Management Committee then decided to award the match to Oxford United.

=== Top goalscorers ===
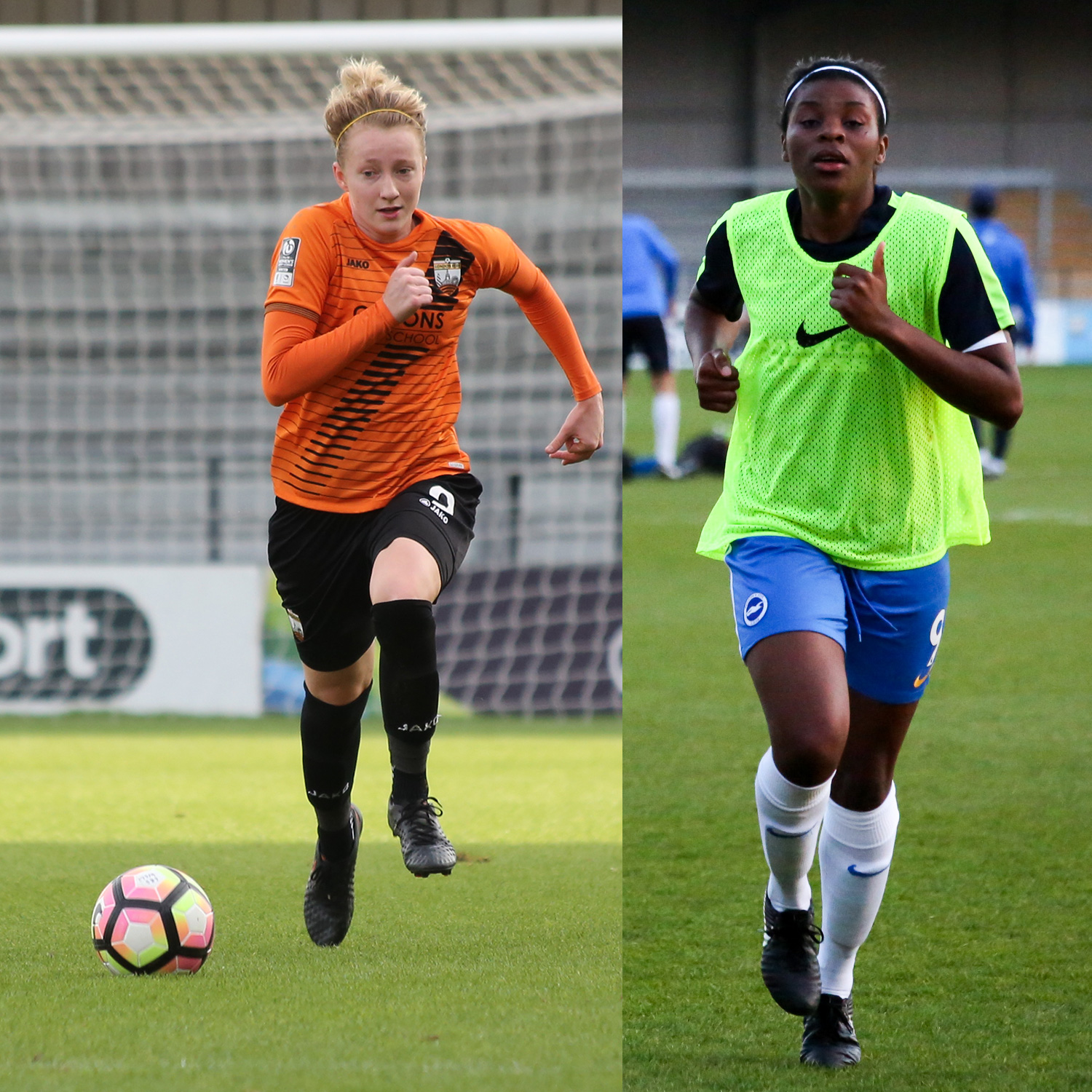
Joint top goalscorers — Jo Wilson (L) & Iniabasi Umotong (R)

Rank	Player	Team	Goals
1	(Nigeria) Iniabasi Umotong	Oxford United	13
1	(England) Jo Wilson	London Bees	13
3	(Wales) Sarah Wiltshire	Yeovil Town	11
4	(Scotland) Claire Emslie	Bristol City	10
5	(England) Millie Farrow	Bristol City	9
5	(England) Beth Hepple	Durham	9
5	(England) Bethan Merrick	Aston Villa	9
8	(England) Ann-Marie Heatherson	Yeovil Town	7
8	(England) Jodie Michalska	Sheffield	7
10	(England) Claudia Walker	Everton	6
10	(England) Katie Wilkinson	Aston Villa	6
10	(England) Ashlee Hincks	Millwall Lionesses	6

== See also ==
- 2016 FA WSL Cup
