= Willie Kirk =

Scottish association football manager (born 1978)

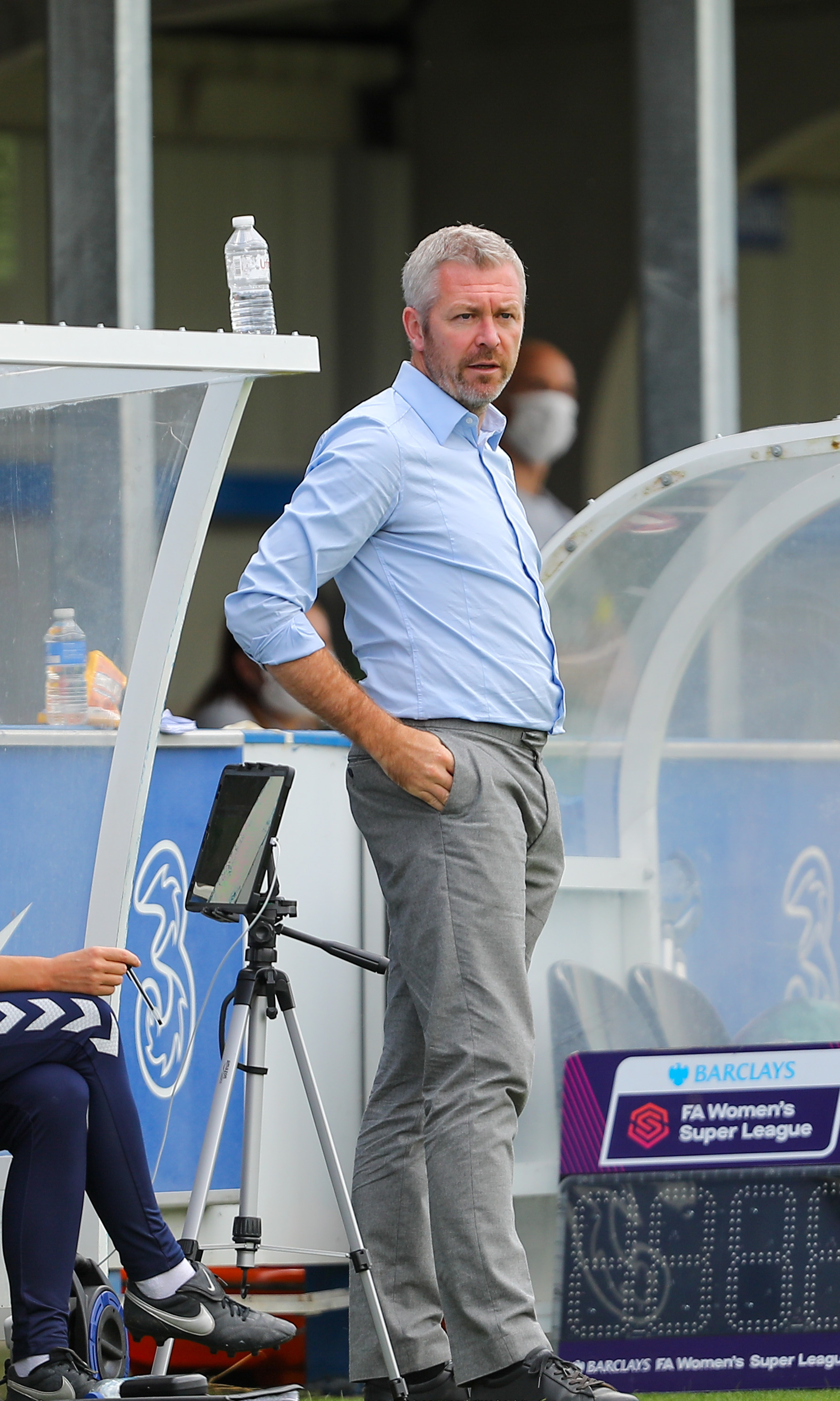
- Kirk in September 2021, managing Everton

Personal information
- Date of birth: 7 June 1978 (age 48)
- Place of birth: Edinburgh, Scotland

Team information
- Current team: Durham W.F.C. (manager)

Senior career*
Years	Team	Apps	(Gls)
- Preston Athletic

Managerial career
- 2010–2014: Hibernian
- 2014–2015: Preston Athletic (men)
- 2015–2018: Bristol City
- 2018: Manchester United (assistant)
- 2018–2021: Everton
- 2022–2024: Leicester City
- 2025–2025: Linköping
- 2026: Djurgårdens IF
- 2026–: Durham W.F.C.
- * Club domestic league appearances and goals

Willie Kirk (born 7 June 1978) is a Scottish football manager who is head coach of Women's Super League 2 club Durham WFC.

== Playing career ==
Kirk played semi-professional football for Pumpherston FC, Whitburn FC, and Preston Athletic, later agreeing to manage the team in the 2014–15 Lowland Football League season.

== Managerial career ==
=== Livingston FC Academy ===
Kirk began his coaching career at Livingston FC as an assistant academy coach to Derek McWilliams for the club's under-14 team in December 2006. He advanced to head coach of the under-14 team the following season, before progressing to the under-15 team, and finally the under-17 team before being headhunted by Hibernian FC.

=== Hibernian ===
In March 2009, Kirk joined the academy coaching staff at Hibernian to become assistant coach of the under-17 team. In January 2010, Kirk then became head coach of the women's team, Hibernian L.F.C. In his first season in charge of Hibernian, he led them to win the 2010 Scottish Cup. Kirk followed up the 2010 cup title by winning the Scottish League Cup in 2011, whilst also finishing as runners-up in the Scottish Cup, and third position in the table. The 2013 season saw Hibernian finishing second and Kirk earning Scottish Women's Football Manager of the Year award.

=== Bristol City ===
In April 2015, Kirk made the move to England and was appointed manager of Bristol City competing in the FA WSL 1. After a rough season, Bristol City was relegated to WSL 2, finishing in last place after the 2015 season. The relegation was short lived, as Kirk's Bristol City rallied in the WSL 2 finishing second during the WSL season and earned promotion back to the FA WSL 1. Kirk's subsequent seasons would see back-to-back eighth-place finishes, maintaining safety in the women's top flight.

=== Manchester United ===
In June 2018, Kirk joined the coaching staff at the newly formed Manchester United as assistant coach to Casey Stoney.

=== Everton ===
In December 2018, Kirk was appointed manager of Everton after being offered the number one position of a top flight team. His debut as manager of the Blues was a victory, defeating rivals Liverpool 2–1. On 16 October 2021, Kirk left his position.

=== Leicester City ===
In July 2022, Kirk was appointed as director of football at Leicester City. On 3 November 2022, Kirk was appointed as manager, following the departure of Lydia Bedford. On 8 March 2024, it was reported that Leicester had suspended Kirk and launched an investigation into an alleged relationship between him and one of the players. The investigation prompted several other managers in women's football to comment that relationships between managers and players are inappropriate. On 28 March 2024, Leicester sacked Kirk as a result of the investigation having found that he had "breached the team's code of conduct to a degree that makes his position untenable".

=== Durham WFC ===
On 7 July 2026, it was announced that Kirk had been named head coach of Women's Super League 2 club Durham WFC.

== Honours ==
Hibernian Women

- Scottish Women's Premier League Cup: 2011
- Scottish Women's Cup: 2010, runners-up: 2011

Individual

- Scottish Women's Football Manager of the Year: 2013
- Women's Super League Manager of the Month: November 2019, October 2023
