= Grace Neville (footballer) =

New Zealand footballer (born 2000)

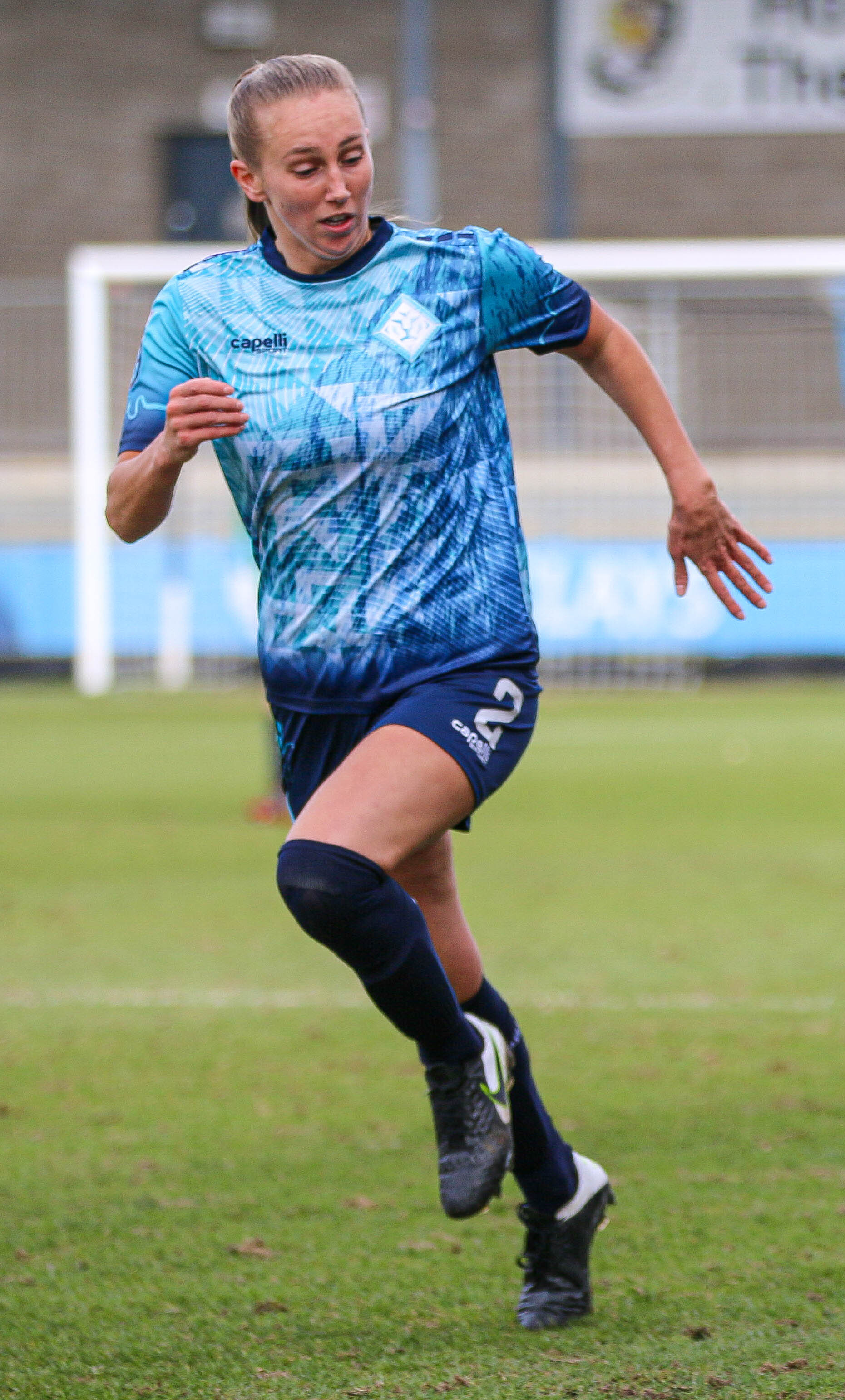
- Neville with London City Lionesses in 2023

Personal information
- Date of birth: 9 April 2000 (age 26)
- Place of birth: London, England
- Height: 5 ft 4 in (1.63 m)
- Position: Defender

Team information
- Current team: Watford (on loan from Ipswich Town)

Youth career
- –2018: Arsenal

College career
| Years | Team | Apps | (Gls) |
| 2018–2019 | Oklahoma State University | | |

Senior career*
| Years | Team | Apps | (Gls) |
| 2019–2025 | London City Lionesses | 88 | (4) |
| 2025– | Ipswich Town | 14 | (0) |
| 2026– | → Watford (loan) | 0 | (0) |

International career^{‡}
| 2017–2018 | England U17 | 4 | (1) |
| 2019 | England U19 | 7 | (0) |
| 2023– | New Zealand | 14 | (0) |
- * Club domestic league appearances and goals as of 25 May 2026. ‡ National team caps and goals as of 25 May 2026.

Grace Neville (born 9 April 2000) is a professional footballer who plays as a defender for Women's Super League 2 side Watford, on loan from Ipswich Town, and the New Zealand national team. Born in England, and having represented England at youth international levels, she represents New Zealand on the senior international stage.

== Early life ==
Grace Neville was born on 9 April 2000 in London, England, to Judy and Mark Neville. Her mother was born in New Zealand. She has an older sister, Molly. Neville began playing football when she was six, and was coached by her father.

Neville attended The Broxbourne School, and was named best all-around female student. She also competed in cross-country and 1500-meter district championships.

== Youth and college career ==
Neville was scouted by the youth academy of Arsenal at the age of nine. A fan of rival team Tottenham Hotspur, Neville has stated she wore her Spurs base layers underneath her Arsenal kit. She was captain of the under-15 team.

In 2017, she was named a Regional Young Sports Performer of the Year.

She remained at Arsenal until she was 18, before moving to Oklahoma State to begin her college career.

== Club career ==
=== London City Lionesses, 2019–2025 ===
In 2019, Neville joined Women's Championship side Millwall Lionesses. Shortly after signing, the club split from Millwall F.C. and formed the independent team London City Lionesses. In the club's inaugural season, Neville scored the team's first goal in their debut match, a 2–1 win over London Bees.

On 4 August 2023, Neville extended her contract with London City for a fifth season. In July 2024, she signed a further one-year contract with the club.

On 22 July 2025, the club announced that Neville would be leaving London City at the end of the season, and thanked her for playing a "pivotal role" in the team's promotion to the Women's Super League. Upon the departure of Neville and Lucy Fitzgerald, there were no members of the inaugural London City Lionesses remaining at the club.

=== Ipswich Town, 2025– ===
On 31 July 2025, Neville joined Women's Super League 2 (WSL 2) team Ipswich Town on a permanent transfer.

==== Loan to Watford, 2026– ====
On 2 September 2026, it was announced that Neville would spend the 2026–27 season on loan at fellow WSL 2 side Watford.

== International career ==
=== England ===
Neville represented England from the under-15, to under-19 age groups. She represented England at the 2017 Under-17 Euro and 2019 Under-19 Euro.

=== New Zealand ===
Neville began representing New Zealand, the country of her mother's birth, in 2023. She first made contact with New Zealand Football when she was 15, and has stated that it ‘‘seemed like an easier decision’’ to stay with England due to her age and the distance between the countries. In November 2021, Neville received her first call up to the New Zealand team as a training player, but struggled during the camp due to long COVID.

On 6 January 2023, Neville received her first call up to the New Zealand national team. She made her debut in a match against the United States on 18 January 2023.

On 4 July 2024, Neville was called up to the New Zealand squad for the 2024 Summer Olympics.

== Personal life ==
Neville is a Tottenham Hotspur fan. She is not related to former England players Gary Neville and Phil Neville.

In June 2026, Neville married fellow professional footballer, Irish international Shanade Hopcroft.

She is a qualified personal trainer.

== Honours ==
London City Lionesses

- Women's Championship: 2024–25
