= Lucy Thomas (footballer) =

English footballer (born 2000)

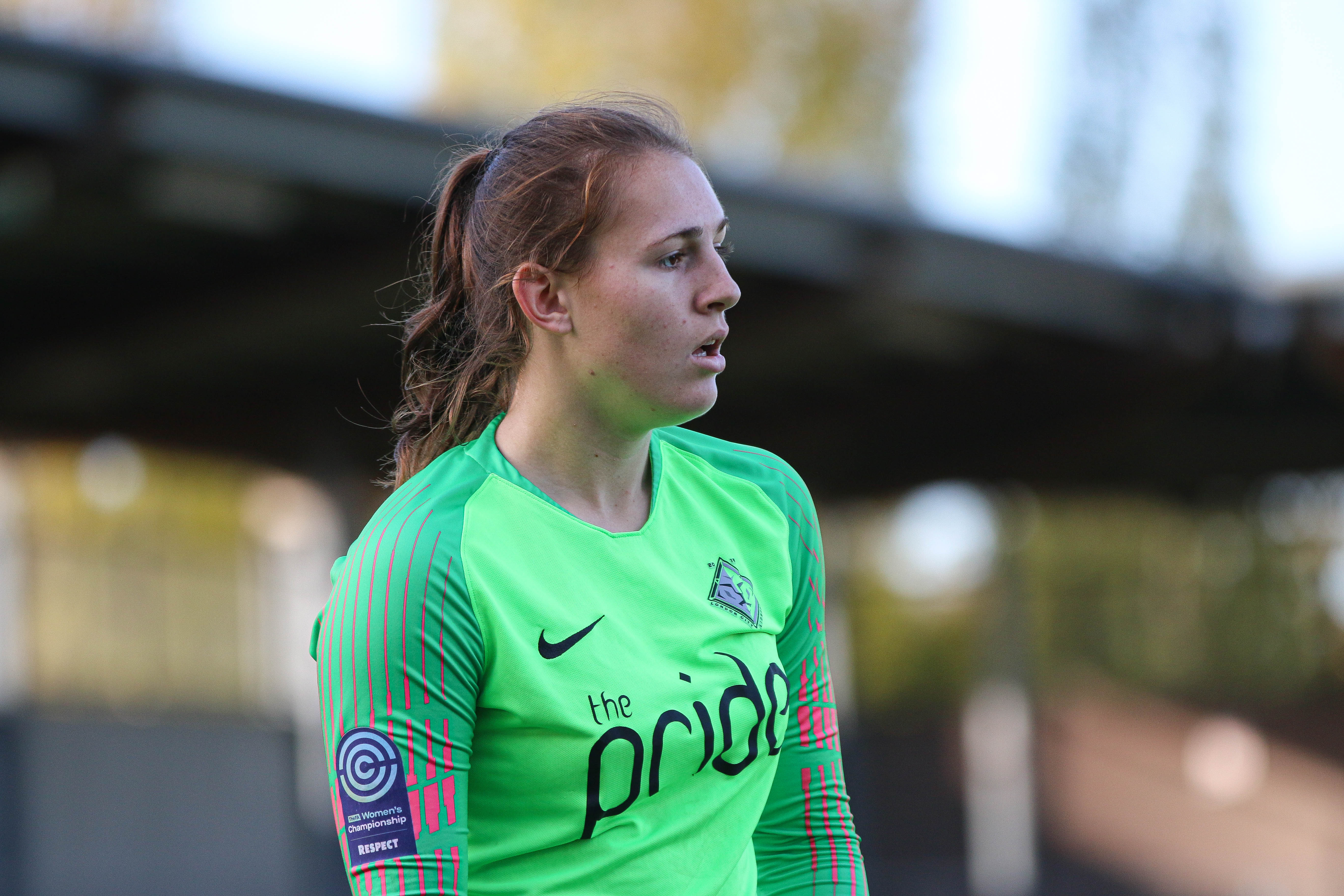
- Thomas in goal for London City Lionesses in 2019

Personal information
- Date of birth: 21 March 2000 (age 26)
- Place of birth: England
- Position: Goalkeeper

Team information
- Current team: Birmingham City
- Number: 1

Youth career
- Arsenal
- Oxford United

Senior career*
Years	Team	Apps	(Gls)
2017–2018	Arsenal	0	(0)
2017–2019	Oxford United	23	(0)
2019–2021	London City Lionesses	15	(0)
2021–2022	Coventry United	13	(0)
2022–	Birmingham City	57	(0)

International career^{‡}
2017–2018	England U17	0	(0)
2023–2024	England U23	1	(0)
2024–	England	0	(0)
- * Club domestic league appearances and goals as of 28 February 2025 ‡ National team caps and goals as of 8 February 2025

Lucy Thomas (born 21 March 2000) is an English professional footballer who plays as a goalkeeper for Women's Super League club Birmingham City and has represented the England U23 national team.

== Youth career ==
Thomas played for Women's Super League club Arsenal, making six appearances in the academy league, as well as Oxford United's Regional Talent Centre, prior to joining the first team aged 16.

== Club career ==
In her senior career, she played for then WSL 2 side Oxford United, making her first appearance in the 2017–18 season, followed by 22 National League appearances in the 2018–19 season.

She then played for Women's Championship clubs, London City Lionesses for two season, followed by Coventry United for the 2021–22 season. prior to joining Birmingham City in July 2022.

In May 2023, Thomas extended her contract until July 2024, with the option for to extend for another year. On 9 July 2024, she signed a one year contract with the club.

== International career ==
In August 2018, Thomas was called up to an England under-19 training camp at St George's Park.

Since February 2023, she has represented England under-23s, making her debut on February 16 against Spain in a 0–0 draw. On 27 May 2024, Thomas was called up to the England senior team standby list for Euro 2025 qualifiers to replace an injured Kayla Rendell. On 2 June she joined the main squad after Mary Earps withdrew due to a hip injury.

== Honours ==
Arsenal

- Women's League Cup: 2017–18

Birmingham City

- Women's Super League 2: 2025–26
- Women's Championship: 2022–23 runner-up

Individual

- Birmingham City Women's Young Player of the Season: 2022–23
