= 2014 FA WSL 2 =

FA WSL 2
- Season: 2014
- Champions: Sunderland
- Promoted: Sunderland
- Matches: 90
- Goals: 308 (3.42 per match)
- Top goalscorer: Fran Kirby (24 goals)
- Biggest home win: Doncaster Rovers Belles 7–0 London Bees (9 August 2014)
- Biggest away win: London Bees 0–9 Doncaster Rovers Belles (26 October 2014)
- Highest scoring: London Bees 1–9 Reading (5 October 2014)
- Longest winning run: 7 games Doncaster Rovers Belles
- Longest unbeaten run: 15 games Sunderland
- Longest winless run: 9 games London Bees
- Longest losing run: 7 games London Bees
- All statistics correct as of 26 October 2014.

The 2014 FA WSL 2 was the first season of the FA WSL 2.

Beginning in the 2014 season, the WSL added a second division, the WSL 2. Because the divisions are interconnected, WSL 1 teams face the risk of relegation for the first time in the league's history. There is, however, no connection to the third level Women's Premier League, so WSL 2 teams cannot be relegated. WSL 1 consists of eight teams while the WSL 2 is made up of ten.

Starting places in both divisions were granted based on applications sent in by clubs. The governing body announced it will partially fund teams in the league, awarding £23,000 in WSL 2.

The Doncaster Rovers Belles challenged for promotion until the final day, due to a 2-1 win over Sunderland. Sunderland won the inaugural WSL 2 on the final day, with a 4-0 win over Millwall Lionesses.

== Teams ==
Locations of the 2014 WSL 2 teams
- Barnet were renamed London Bees.
- Durham were a newly formed team admitted to the WSL 2.
- Due to the new format, several movements between various leagues took place.

Team	Location	Ground	Manufacturer	Sponsors	last season
Aston Villa	Sutton Coldfield	Trevor Brown Memorial Ground	Macron	dafabet	12/13 FA Women's Premier League, 6th
Doncaster Rovers Belles	Doncaster	Keepmoat Stadium	Jako	BPP University	2013 WSL, 8th
Durham	Durham	New Ferens Park	Hummel	Wood Estate Agents	new team
London Bees	Canons Park	The Hive Stadium	Jako	Stanmore College	12/13 FA Women's Premier League, 10th (as Barnet FC)
Millwall Lionesses	London	Champion Hill	Protime Sports	BT Sport	12/13 Women's Premier 2nd Level South, 2nd
Oxford United	Oxford	Rover Cowley Sports Ground	Nike	Polythene UK	12/13 Women's Combination South-West, 1st
Reading	Tadley	Barlow's Park	Puma	Waitrose	12/13 Women's Premier 2nd Level South, 1st
Sunderland	Hetton-le-Hole	Eppleton Colliery Welfare Ground	Adidas	Bidvest	12/13 FA Women's Premier League, 1st
Watford	Berkhamsted	Broadwater	Puma	McGinley Support Services	12/13 FA Women's Premier League, 2nd
Yeovil Town	Sherborne	Raleigh Grove	Sondico	Quaedam Yeovil Shopping	12/13 Women's Premier 2nd Level South, 3rd

=== Table ===
Pos	Team	Pld	W	D	L	GF	GA	GD	Pts	Promotion
1	Sunderland (C)	18	15	2	1	47	15	+32	47	Promotion to FA WSL 1
2	Doncaster Rovers Belles	18	14	3	1	56	14	+42	45	
3	Reading	18	13	2	3	60	21	+39	41	
4	Aston Villa	18	9	3	6	25	26	−1	30	
5	Yeovil Town	18	6	4	8	27	26	+1	22	
6	Durham	18	5	3	10	19	32	−13	18	
7	Watford	18	5	3	10	22	37	−15	18	
8	Millwall Lionesses	18	4	3	11	20	36	−16	15	
9	Oxford United	18	3	3	12	16	44	−28	12	
10	London Bees	18	2	2	14	16	57	−41	8	

Source: BBC Sport
Rules for classification: 1) Points; 2) Goal difference; 3) Number of goals scored
(C) Champions

=== Results ===
Home \ Away	AST	DON	DUR	LON	MIL	OXF	REA	SUN	WAT	YEO
Aston Villa		0–2	1–0	4–1	2–0	2–1	3–0	0–3	1–0	1–1
Doncaster Rovers Belles	6–1		2–0	7–0	4–1	4–1	5–2	1–1	2–0	2–0
Durham Women	2–0	0–0		2–1	1–4	1–2	0–3	2–4	1–2	1–1
London Bees	0–1	0–9	0–1		1–0	1–1	1–9	0–3	4–5	0–2
Millwall Lionesses	2–3	0–0	1–2	2–2		2–0	1–4	0–4	1–0	3–1
Oxford United	0–2	1–5	2–2	0–3	1–0		2–2	2–3	1–2	0–1
Reading	3–1	4–0	4–0	5–1	3–1	5–0		1–1	3–0	3–0
Sunderland	3–1	1–2	2–0	1–0	4–0	2–0	3–2		4–1	2–0
Watford	1–1	1–3	0–3	1–0	2–2	1–2	0–4	2–4		1–1
Yeovil Town	1–1	1–2	3–1	4–1	2–0	6–0	2–3	1–2	0–3	

Updated to match(es) played on 26 October 2014. Source: FA WSL results
Legend: Blue = home team win; Yellow = draw; Red = away team win.

=== Top scorers ===
Rank	Scorer	Club	Goals
1	(England) Fran Kirby	Reading	24
2	(England) Beth Mead	Sunderland	13
3	(England) Lauren Bruton	Reading	11
3	(England) Sue Smith	Doncaster Rovers Belles	11
3	(Wales) Sarah Wiltshire	Watford; Yeovil Town	11
6	(England) Keira Ramshaw	Sunderland	10
6	(England) Courtney Sweetman-Kirk	Doncaster Rovers Belles	10
8	Bethany England	Doncaster Rovers Belles	8
9	(England) Millie Bright	Doncaster Rovers Belles	7
10	(Northern Ireland) Rachel Furness	Sunderland	6
10	(England) Katie Wilkinson	Aston Villa	6
10	(England) Jo Wilson	Watford	6
