= 2014 FA WSL 1 =

Fourth season of the top English women's association football league

FA WSL 1
- Season: 2014
- Champions: Liverpool; 2nd WSL title
- Relegated: Everton
- Champions League: Liverpool; Chelsea
- Matches: 56
- Goals: 139 (2.48 per match)
- Top goalscorer: Karen Carney (8 goals)
- Biggest home win: Bristol Academy 5–2 Everton (23 August 2014); Chelsea 5–2 Everton (5 October 2014); Liverpool 3–0 Bristol Academy (12 October 2014)
- Biggest away win: Manchester City 0–4 Arsenal (24 August 2014)
- Highest scoring: Bristol Academy 5–2 Everton (23 August 2014); Bristol Academy 3–4 Arsenal (20 September 2014); Chelsea 5–2 Everton (5 October 2014)
- Longest winning run: 4 games Chelsea
- Longest unbeaten run: 7 games Birmingham City
- Longest winless run: 14 games Everton
- Longest losing run: 5 games Everton
- Total attendance: 39,519
- Average attendance: 719
- All statistics correct as of 12 October 2014.

The 2014 FA WSL 1 was the fourth season of the FA WSL, the top-level women's football league of England. The season began on 30 March and ended on 12 October.

Liverpool L.F.C. are the defending champions from the 2013 FA WSL. The top two teams qualify for the 2015–16 UEFA Women's Champions League.

Beginning in the 2014 season, the WSL added a second division, the WSL 2. Because the divisions are interconnected, WSL 1 teams face the risk of relegation for the first time in the league's history. There is, however, no connection to the third level Women's Premier League, so WSL 2 teams cannot be relegated. WSL 1 consists of eight teams while the WSL 2 is made up of ten.

Starting places in both divisions were granted based on applications sent in by clubs, so Manchester City were able to enter its newly created women's team directly into the WSL 1. The governing body announced it will partially fund teams in the league, awarding £70,000 to clubs in WSL1

Liverpool retained the title on goal difference, after they and Chelsea finished level on 26 points. Everton were relegated to the WSL 2 for the 2015 season after 21 years as a top flight club.

== Teams ==
- Lincoln were renamed Notts County and relocated from Lincoln to Nottingham.
- Due to the new format, several movements between various leagues took place.
Locations of the 2014 Super League teams

Team	Location	Ground	Manufacturer	Sponsors	2013 WSL finish
Arsenal	Borehamwood	Meadow Park	Nike	Emirates	3rd
Birmingham City	Solihull	Damson Park	Sondico	Hollywood Monster	4th
Bristol Academy	Filton	Stoke Gifford Stadium	Bristol Sports	DAS	2nd
Chelsea	Staines	Wheatsheaf Park	Adidas	Samsung	7th
Manchester City	Manchester	Academy Stadium	Nike	Etihad Airways	12/13 Women's Premier League, 4th (promoted)
Everton	Widnes	Halton Stadium	Nike	Chang Beer	5th
Liverpool	Widnes	Halton Stadium	Warrior	Standard Chartered	1st
Notts County Ladies	Nottingham	Meadow Lane	Fila	Pinnacle	6th

== Table ==
Pos	Team	Pld	W	D	L	GF	GA	GD	Pts	Qualification or relegation
1	Liverpool (C)	14	7	5	2	19	10	+9	26	Qualification for the Champions League knockout phase
2	Chelsea	14	8	2	4	23	16	+7	26	Qualification for the Champions League knockout phase
3	Birmingham City	14	7	4	3	20	14	+6	25	
4	Arsenal	14	6	3	5	24	21	+3	21	
5	Manchester City	14	6	1	7	13	16	−3	19	
6	Notts County	14	4	6	4	12	8	+4	18	
7	Bristol Academy	14	5	1	8	18	24	−6	16	
8	Everton (R)	14	0	4	10	10	30	−20	4	Relegated to FA WSL 2

Source: FA WSL
Rules for classification: 1) Points; 2) Goal difference; 3) Number of goals scored
(C) Champions; (R) Relegated

== Results ==
Home \ Away	ARS	BIR	BRI	CHE	EVE	LIV	MCI	NTC
Arsenal		0–2	0–2	2–3	3–1	3–3	0–1	1–1
Birmingham City	1–2		2–1	2–1	0–0	1–2	2–0	2–2
Bristol Academy	3–4	1–3		0–2	5–2	1–3	1–0	0–2
Chelsea	2–1	3–1	2–1		5–2	0–0	2–1	0–0
Everton	1–2	0–0	1–1	1–2		2–2	0–3	0–2
Liverpool	0–1	1–1	3–0	2–0	1–0		1–0	1–0
Manchester City	0–4	1–2	0–2	2–1	2–0	1–0		1–0
Notts County	1–1	0–1	awd (Note: Game awarded to Bristol Academy)	1–0	2–0	0–0	1–1	

Updated to match(es) played on 12 October 2014. Source: FA WSL results
Legend: Blue = home team win; Yellow = draw; Red = away team win.

== Top scorers ==
Rank	Scorer	Club	Goals
1	(England) Karen Carney	Birmingham City	8
2	(England) Jessica Clarke	Notts County	6
3	(England) Eniola Aluko	Chelsea	5
3	(Japan) Yūki Ōgimi	Chelsea	5
3	(England) Jordan Nobbs	Arsenal	5
3	(England) Nikita Parris	Everton	5
3	(England) Casey Stoney	Arsenal	5
3	(England) Nicola Watts	Bristol Academy	5
9	(England) Danielle Carter	Arsenal	4
9	(England) Kirsty Linnett	Birmingham City	4
9	(Spain) Natalia Pablos	Bristol Academy	4
9	(England) Kelly Smith	Arsenal	4

== See also ==
- 2014 FA WSL 2
- 2014 FA WSL Cup
