= Poppy Wilson =

English footballer

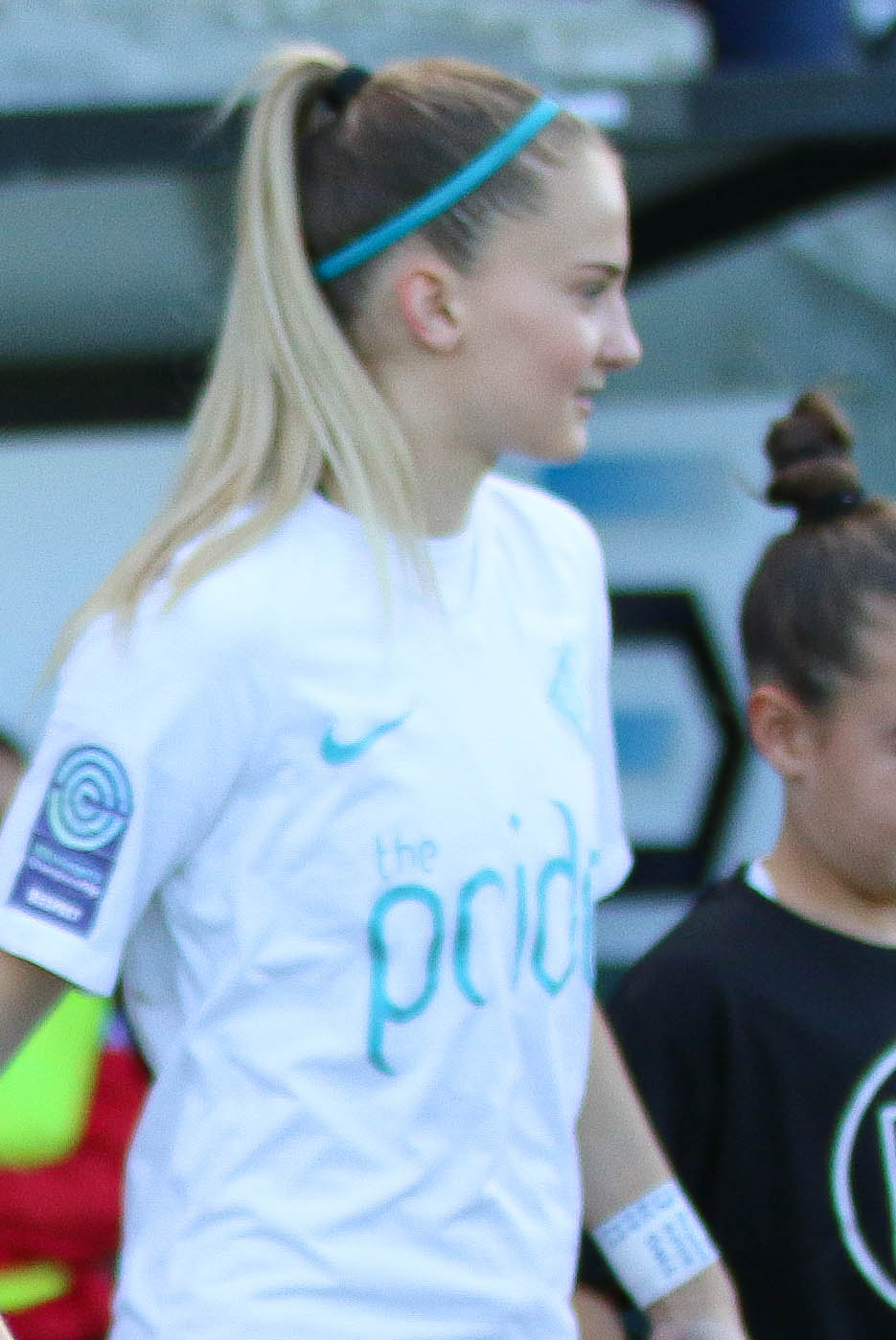

Personal information
- Full name: Poppy Alice Wilson
- Date of birth: 6 August 1999 (age 27)
- Place of birth: Glastonbury, England
- Positions: Midfielder; forward

Team information
- Current team: Watford
- Number: 18

Youth career
- Somerset
- 2014–2017: Bristol City

Senior career*
Years	Team	Apps	(Gls)
2016–2019	Bristol City	8	(1)
2019–2021	London City Lionesses	26	(6)
2021–2022	Bridgwater United	14	(4)
2022–	Watford	53	(18)

International career
- England U17
- England U19
- England U21
- * Club domestic league appearances and goals as of 13 October 2019

Poppy Wilson (born 6 August 1999) is an English footballer currently playing for Watford in the Women's Championship.

== Club career ==
=== Bristol City ===
Wilson joined Bristol City's academy in 2014, enrolling at SGS College to continue her studies while training with Bristol. She captained the college team to the English Colleges Football Association (ECFA) Cup title. In 2017, Wilson captained the Bristol City Development Squad to the Development League FA Cup victory.

In 2016, Wilson made her Bristol City senior team debut in a 2–0 WSL Cup defeat to Sheffield FC, making more regular appearances in the 2017–18 season. Wilson signed her first professional contract with the club in January 2018. On 3 February 2019, Wilson scored her first senior goal in a 3–0 FA Cup fourth round win over Wimbledon.

=== London City Lionesses ===
Ahead of the 2019–20 season, Wilson moved to newly-formed London City Lionesses for their inaugural season and made her debut for the club starting in the season opening victory over London Bees.

=== Watford FC Women ===
Ahead of the 2022–23 season, Wilson signed for Watford F.C. Women. Wilson scored in Watford's 1–0 win over Nottingham Forest to win the National League promotion play-off and secure a place for Watford in the Women's Championship.

== International career ==
Wilson is a youth international having represented England at under-17, under-18, under-19, and under-21 levels.
