= Ellie Mason =

Northern Irish footballer

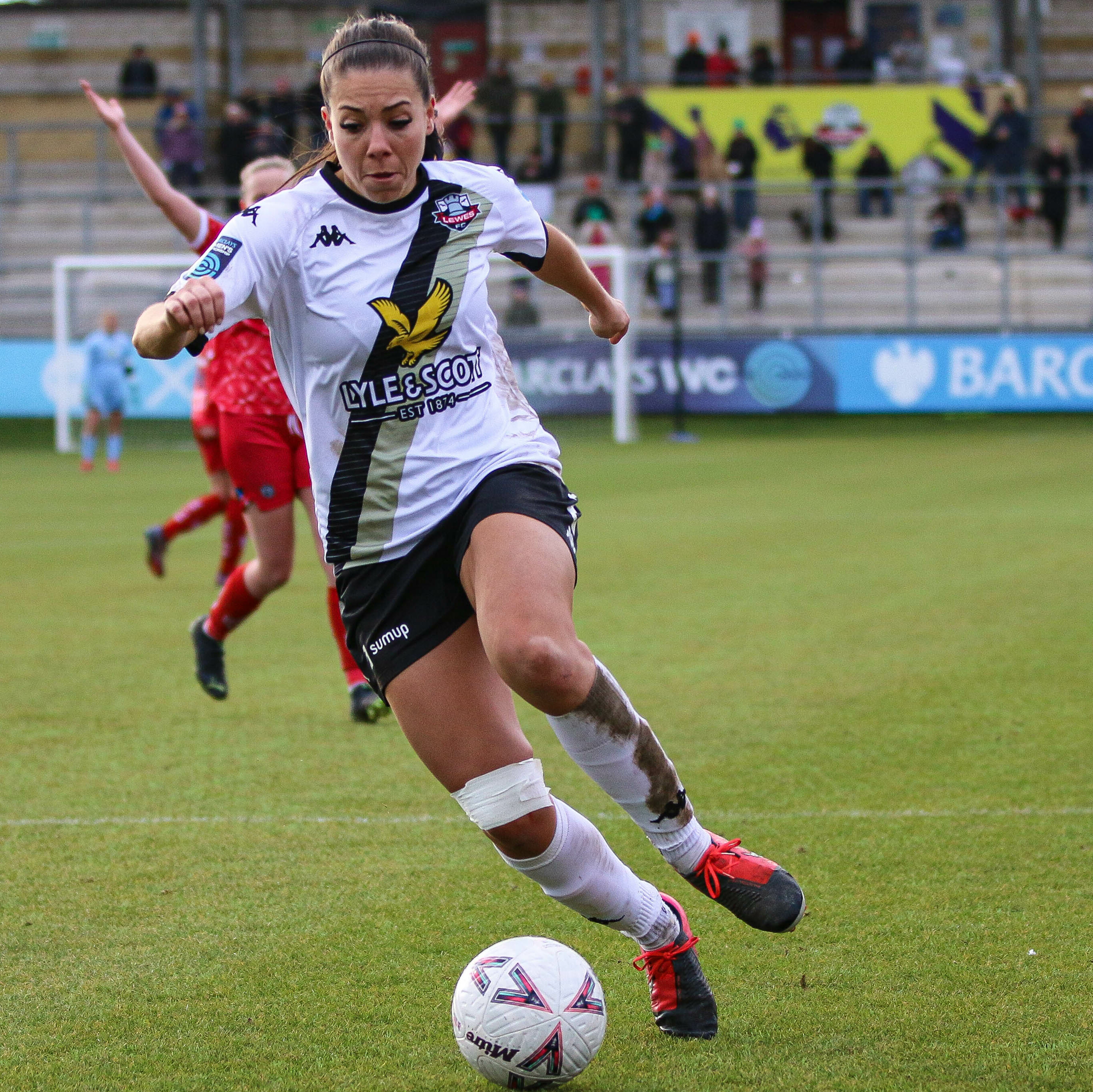
- Ellie Mason during the 6-1 defeat of Cardiff in 2023

Personal information
- Full name: Ellie Leigh Mason
- Date of birth: 16 February 1996 (age 30)
- Place of birth: England
- Height: 1.70 m (5 ft 7 in)
- Positions: Midfielder; forward; defender

Team information
- Current team: Charlton Athletic
- Number: 2

Youth career
- Watford
- 2011–2015: Chelsea

Senior career*
Years	Team	Apps	(Gls)
2015–2016	Watford	26	(7)
2017–2018	Millwall Lionesses	18	(1)
2018–2019	Yeovil Town	16	(3)
2019–2021	London City Lionesses	17	(4)
2021–2023	Lewes	33	(5)
2023–2025	Birmingham City	22	(3)
2025–	Charlton Athletic	2	(0)

International career^{‡}
2022	Gibraltar	2	(0)
2022–	Northern Ireland	19	(2)
- * Club domestic league appearances and goals as of 29 April 2025 ‡ National team caps and goals as of 18 October 2026

Ellie Leigh Mason (born 16 February 1996) is a professional footballer who plays as a midfielder for Women's Super League club Charlton Athletic. Born in England, she represents Northern Ireland at international level.

== Club career ==
Mason began her career in Watford's youth teams. After moving on to Chelsea, she appeared 23 times for the club's development team, scoring six goals. Nineteen-year-old Mason returned to Watford in April 2015, after four years with Chelsea. In 2015, she was Watford's top-goalscorer with five goals and won the club's Goal of the Season award for a strike against Aston Villa. She scored three goals in 14 appearances in the 2016 season, then signed for Millwall Lionesses in February 2017.

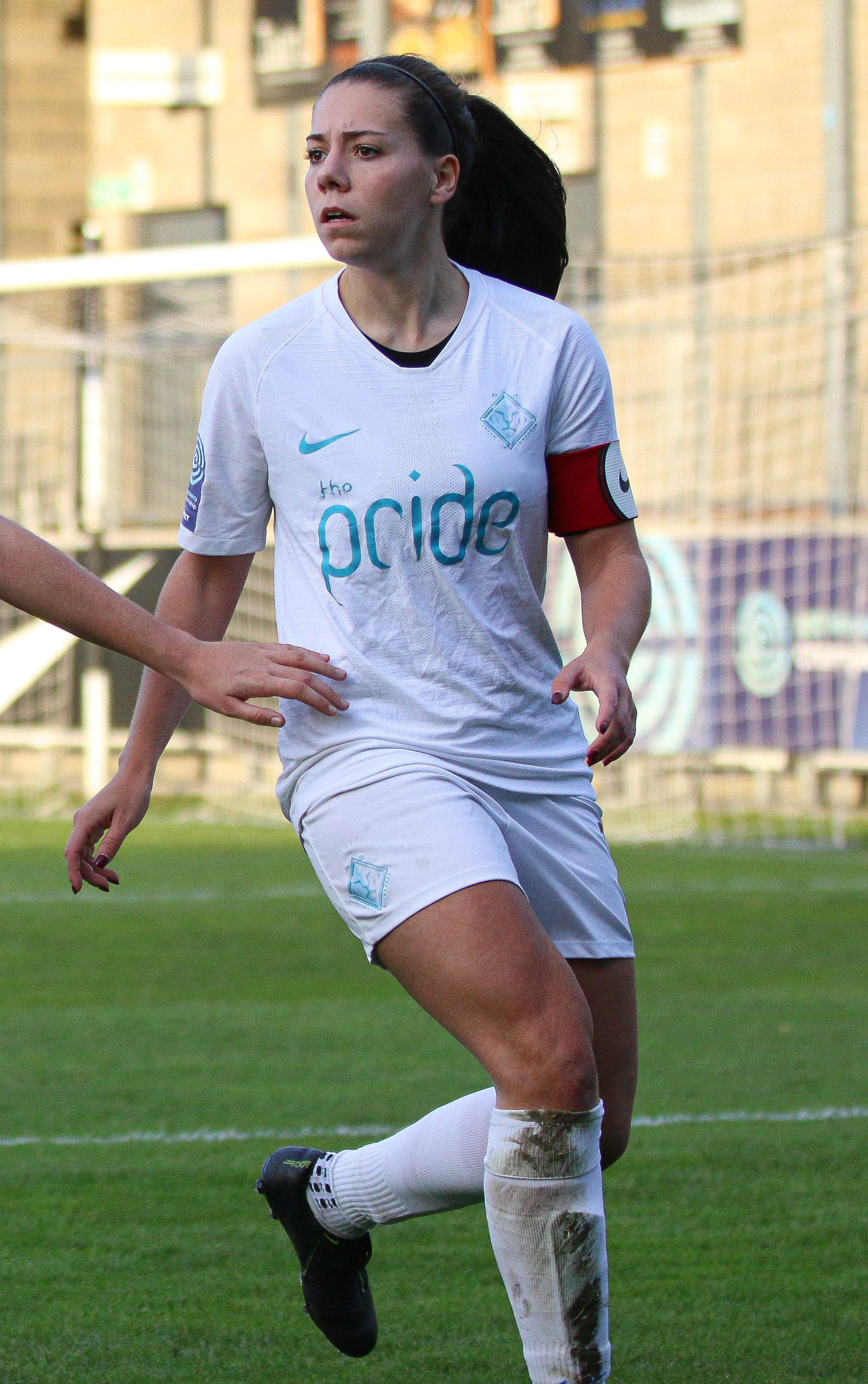
Mason with London City Lionesses in 2019

After spending the FA WSL Spring Series and 2017–18 season with Millwall Lionesses, Mason signed a full-time professional contract with Yeovil Town in August 2018.

At Yeovil Town Mason converted to playing as a defender, but the club finished a distant last in the 2018–19 FA WSL after a series of hurtful on-field drubbings and a 10-point penalty imposed for insolvency. Yeovil were then kicked out of the top two Leagues when The FA rejected their purported business plan.

Mason then joined new FA Women's Championship club London City Lionesses, where she was appointed club captain. However, after being released by the club in 2021, she signed for Lewes on 28 July.

Mason was with Lewes as they joined the last eight clubs in the Women's FA Cup. During a match against Chelsea she scored for goals. Mason signed a two-year contract with Birmingham City Women in July 2023.

On 24 July 2025, it was announced that Mason had signed with WSL2 side Charlton Athletic.

== International career ==
Mason was eligible to represent England, Gibraltar and Northern Ireland at international level. She received her first international call up for Gibraltar in February 2022. In August 2022, she was called up to the Northern Ireland squad after switching her international allegiance from Gibraltar.

== Career statistics ==
=== International ===
As of 13 October 2026

Gibraltar
Year	Apps	Goals
2022	2	0
Total	2	0

Northern Ireland
Year	Apps	Goals
2023	2	0
2024	4	0
2025	7	0
2026	6	2
Total	19	2

=== International goals ===
Scores and results list Northern Ireland's goal tally first, score column indicates score after each Mason goal.

List of international goals scored by Ellie Mason
No.	Date	Venue	Opponent	Score	Result	Competition
1	18 April 2026	Centenary Stadium, Ta' Qali, Malta	Malta	1–0	4–2	2027 FIFA Women's World Cup qualification
2	18 April 2026	Centenary Stadium, Ta' Qali, Malta	Malta	2–1	4–2	2027 FIFA Women's World Cup qualification
