= Lucy Fitzgerald (footballer) =

English footballer (born 2000)

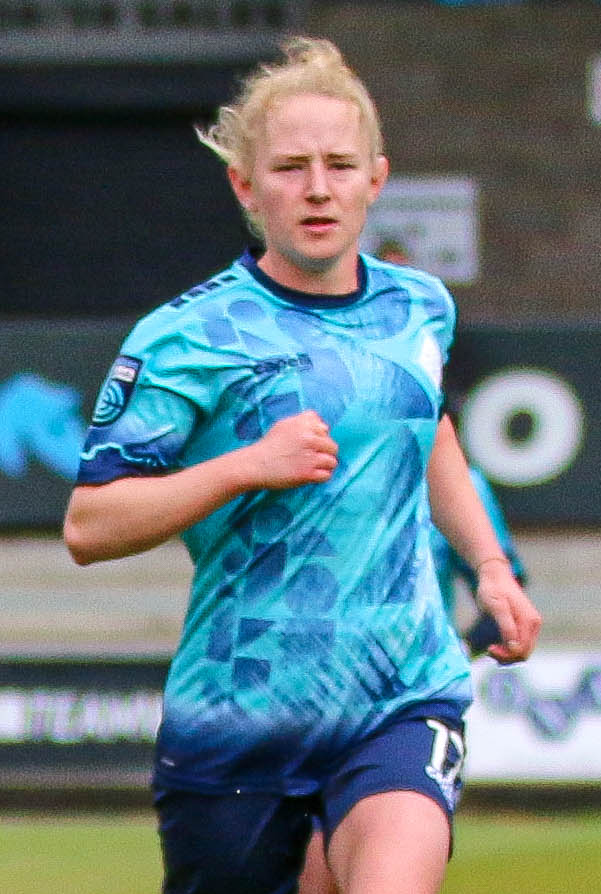

Personal information
- Full name: Lucy Fitzgerald
- Date of birth: 29 December 2000 (age 25)
- Place of birth: Kent, England
- Height: 1.65 m (5 ft 5 in)
- Position: Forward

Team information
- Current team: Charlton Athletic

Senior career*
Years	Team	Apps	(Gls)
–2018	Millwall Lionesses		
2018–2025	London City Lionesses	115	(6)
2025–	Charlton Athletic	18	(2)

International career^{‡}
2019	England U19	5	(3)
- * Club domestic league appearances and goals as of 23 April 2025 ‡ National team caps and goals as of 23 April 2025

Lucy Fitzgerald (born 29 November 2000) is an English footballer who plays as a midfielder for Women's Super League club Charlton Athletic. She has previously played for London City Lionesses.

== Club career ==
=== London City Lionesses ===
Fitzgerald joined the London City Lionesses for the 2018–19 season. July 2024 it was announced that she signed a one-year contract extension with the London City Lionesses.

=== Charlton Athletic ===
On 26 July 2025, it was announced that Fitzgerald had signed for Women's Super League 2 side Charlton Athletic. On 14 September 2025, she scored the winning goal in the 83rd minute of Charlton's 2–1 win over Durham.
