= Sarah Robson =

Northern Irish footballer (born 1987)

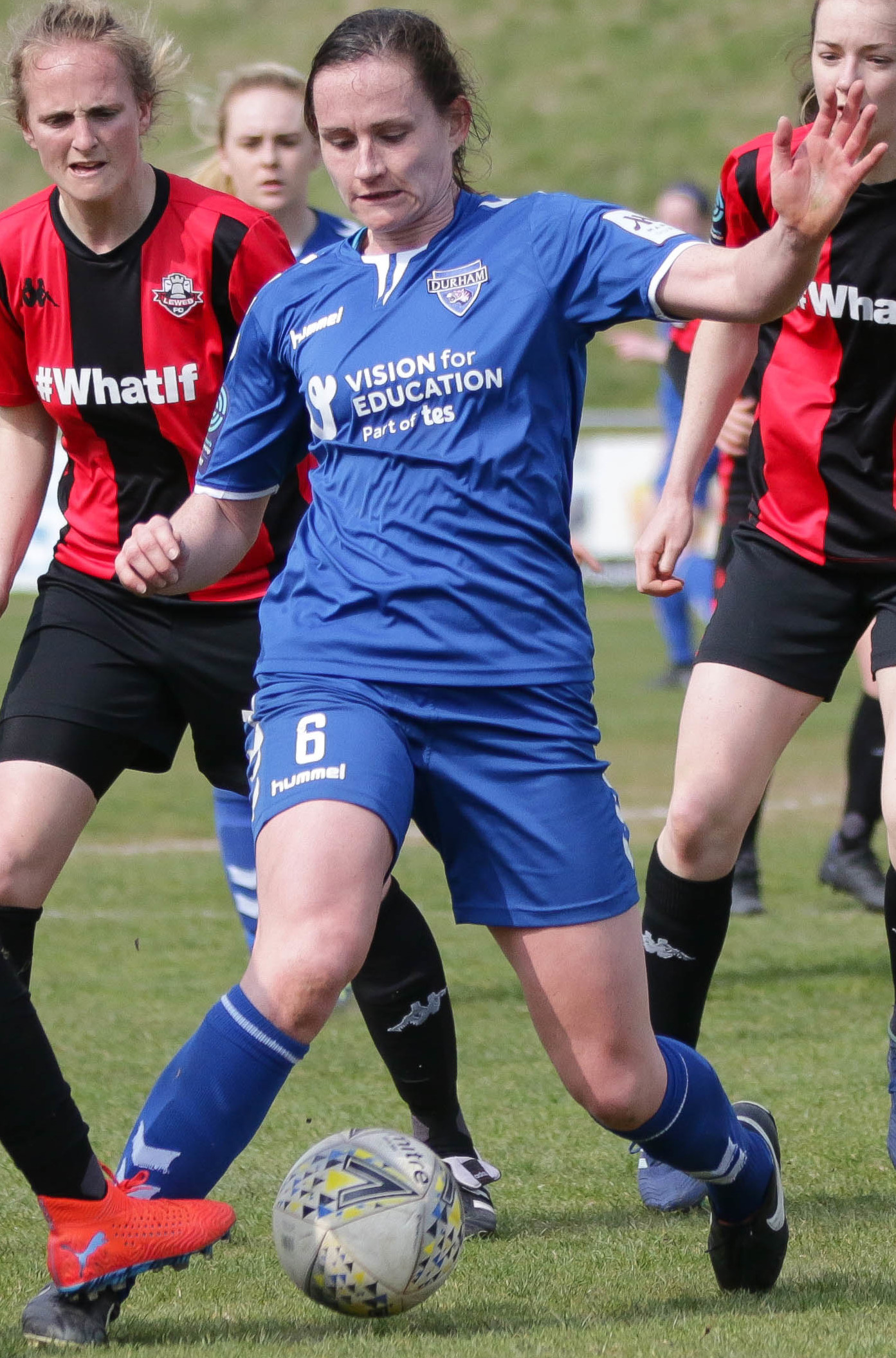
- Robson (6) playing for Durham in March 2019

Personal information
- Full name: Sarah Cathryn Ann Robson
- Birth name: Sarah Cathryn Ann McFadden
- Date of birth: 23 May 1987 (age 39)
- Place of birth: Bellaghy, Northern Ireland
- Height: 5 ft 10 in (1.78 m)
- Positions: Centre back; centre forward

Team information
- Current team: Middlesbrough

Youth career
- 2005–2008: Southern Miss Golden Eagles

Senior career*
Years	Team	Apps	(Gls)
- Moyola Park
- Ballymena United Allstars
2008	Fylkir	9	(0)
2009–2011	Grindavík	35	(4)
2010–2015	Sunderland	9	(0)
2012	FH	9	(4)
2017–2026	Durham	130	(13)
2026–	Middlesbrough	0	(0)

International career^{‡}
2005–	Northern Ireland	102	(9)
- * Club domestic league appearances and goals ‡ National team caps and goals as of 30 January 2025 (UTC)

Sarah Cathryn Ann Robson (née McFadden; born 23 May 1987) is a Northern Irish professional footballer who plays as a centre-back or striker for National League North club Middlesbrough and the Northern Ireland national team.

== Career ==
Magherafelt-born Robson played in Northern Ireland for Moyola Park and Ballymena United Allstars. In 2005, she won a scholarship to University of Southern Mississippi and played varsity soccer for Southern Miss Golden Eagles. Following graduation she headed to the Icelandic Úrvalsdeild, where she played for Fylkir, then Grindavík.

At the end of the 2010 Icelandic season, Robson and international teammate Rachel Furness left Grindavík for Sunderland.

In June 2012 The Belfast Telegraph newspaper reported that three Northern Ireland players including Robson had been selected in the 18-player Great Britain squad for the 2012 London Olympics. But Robson quickly denied the report: "I haven't received anything about being in final squad... Wish it was true but unfortunately not." When the final squad was named, no Northern Irish or Welsh players were included.

On 13 January 2016, it was announced she was leaving Sunderland after five years serving the club and signing with Durham.

On 15 June 2026, it was announced that Robson had joined National League North club Middlesbrough in a player-coach role.

== International career ==
Robson made her international debut for the Northern Ireland national team in 2005.

Robson was part of the squad that was called up to the UEFA Women's Euro 2022.

She won her 100th cap in a 1-0 win over Albania in the 2023–24 UEFA Women's Nations League on 26 September 2023; Robson was substituted at half-time, and passed the armband to Lauren Wade, who was making her 50th appearance for the national side.

== International goals ==
List of international goals scored by Sarah Robson
No.	Date	Venue	Opponent	Score	Result	Competition
1.	23 November 2006	Tarsus Stadium, Tarsus, Turkey	Croatia	3–0	5–1	UEFA Women's Euro 2009 qualifying
2.	23 November 2006	Tarsus Stadium, Tarsus, Turkey	Croatia	4–0	5–1	UEFA Women's Euro 2009 qualifying
3.	23 November 2006	Tarsus Stadium, Tarsus, Turkey	Croatia	5–1	5–1	UEFA Women's Euro 2009 qualifying
4.	26 May 2007	The Showgrounds, Coleraine, Northern Ireland	Czech Republic	1–0	1–3	UEFA Women's Euro 2009 qualifying
5.	2 September 2022	Stade Émile Mayrisch, Esch-sur-Alzette, Luxembourg	Luxembourg	1–0	2–1	2023 FIFA Women's World Cup qualification
6.	15 November 2022	Seaview, Belfast, Northern Ireland	Italy	1–0	1–0	Friendly
7.	18 July 2023	Stadion v Městských sadech, Opava, Czech Republic	Czech Republic	1–0	2–0	Friendly
