= Princes Park (Dartford) =

English football stadium

Coordinates: 51°26′14″N 0°13′51″E

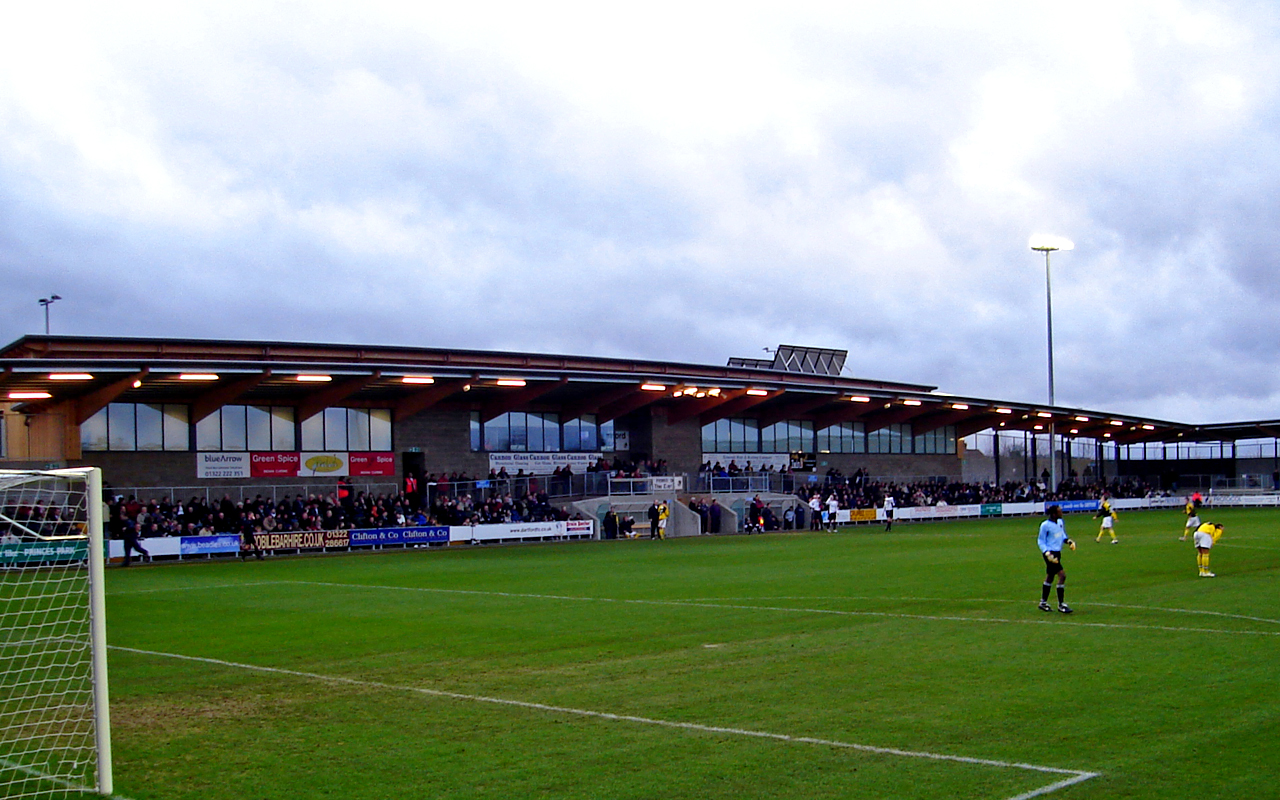
- Princes Park stadium during a match between Dartford and Burgess Hill Town, January 2007
- Interactive map of Princes Park
- Location: Darenth Road; Dartford; DA1 1RT
- Owner: Dartford Borough Council
- Operator: Dartford
- Capacity: 4,100 (642 seated)
- Surface: Grass

Construction
- Groundbreaking: 2005
- Opened: 17 November 2006
- Cost: £7 million
- Architect: Alexander Sedgley

Tenants
- Dartford (2006–present); Greenwich Borough (2013–2016); Thamesmead Town (2017–2018); Millwall Lionesses (2018); London City Lionesses (2019–2024); Halls Athletic (2025–present)

Princes Park is a football stadium in Dartford, Kent, England. It has been the home of Dartford Football Club since 2006. Halls Athletic entered into a groundshare arrangement at the stadium in 2025, and signed a further three year deal in 2026. The stadium's postcode is DA1 1RT, the closest possible representation of the word "Dart". DA1 1FC was unobtainable, as the letter C is not allocated for use at the end of British postcodes. The stadium is owned by Dartford Borough Council.

== Construction ==
Construction work began on 14 November 2005. Designed by Alexander Sedgley architects, the stadium has a capacity of 4,100 (642 seated), and has been described as one of the most ecologically sound ever built. The pitch level is sunk two meters below the external ground level to reduce noise and light pollution. It is estimated to have cost around £7 million. The stadium was opened on 11 November 2006 when Dartford FC, who had been without a home ground in the borough since 1992, beat Horsham YMCA 4–2 in an Isthmian League Division One South league fixture, in front of a capacity 4,097 crowd.

The stadium roof has a sedum roof blanket, a living roof that provides a natural air filtration system. Solar panels on the roof serve the community changing areas and public toilets hot water storage cylinders. The roof is supported by treated Glulam timber beams. Water recycling system which serves the toilets within the clubhouse. Rain water is collected in the two large ponds at the north end of the stadium grounds. Underfloor heating on both levels of the clubhouse. Low energy lighting. Increased fabric insulation to give the clubhouse better thermal retention and efficiency. Condensing boilers to provide a more energy efficient system. Also excavated earth was reused for landscaping the external courtyard areas around the stadium.

== Facilities ==
Princes Park has an all-weather training pitch available for community use, and the stadium's clubhouse which contains bars, banqueting suites and meeting rooms.

Located close to Dartford town centre and the M25 motorway, Princes Park is also served by a dedicated "Fastrack" bus stop. The use of public transport for travel to the stadium is encouraged, although there is a dedicated car park with spaces for up to 300 vehicles. Vehicle access is via Grassbanks, a new road named by the winner of a local newspaper competition. On non-matchdays, this is available for use as a "park and ride" station for users of the Fastrack bus service.

== Sports ==
Sports played at the stadium include

- Football - Dartford play home matches at the stadium
- Road running - Dartford Roadrunners are based at the stadium
- Golf - Princes Golf, a nine-hole golf course, which closed in November 2005 when construction work on the stadium began, and was re-opened in October 2007 after remodelling work.

== Commendations ==
The stadium has received a number of commendations for its design and environmentally friendly features. The Royal Institution of Chartered Surveyors acknowledged the stadium for being "green", and the venue has received significant publicity in the national press. Princes Park was the winner of the GT Ground Awards, "Best New Non-League Ground" award. saying, "Let's hope other forward-thinking councils will follow their lead." On Sky Sports Soccer AM show in April 2007, Fashion designer and architect Wayne Hemingway said of Princes Park "It's got a grass roof all the way around the outside, it's got solar panels it's totally sustainable and creates its own electricity. That's the way that buildings should go, it's just fantastic, and it's definitely the best stadium in the country." Adding that "the absolute number one new stadium in the country is from a club that is in the conference - Dartford" ahead of Arsenal's Emirates Stadium and the new Wembley Stadium.
