= Katie Wilkinson =

English Football player

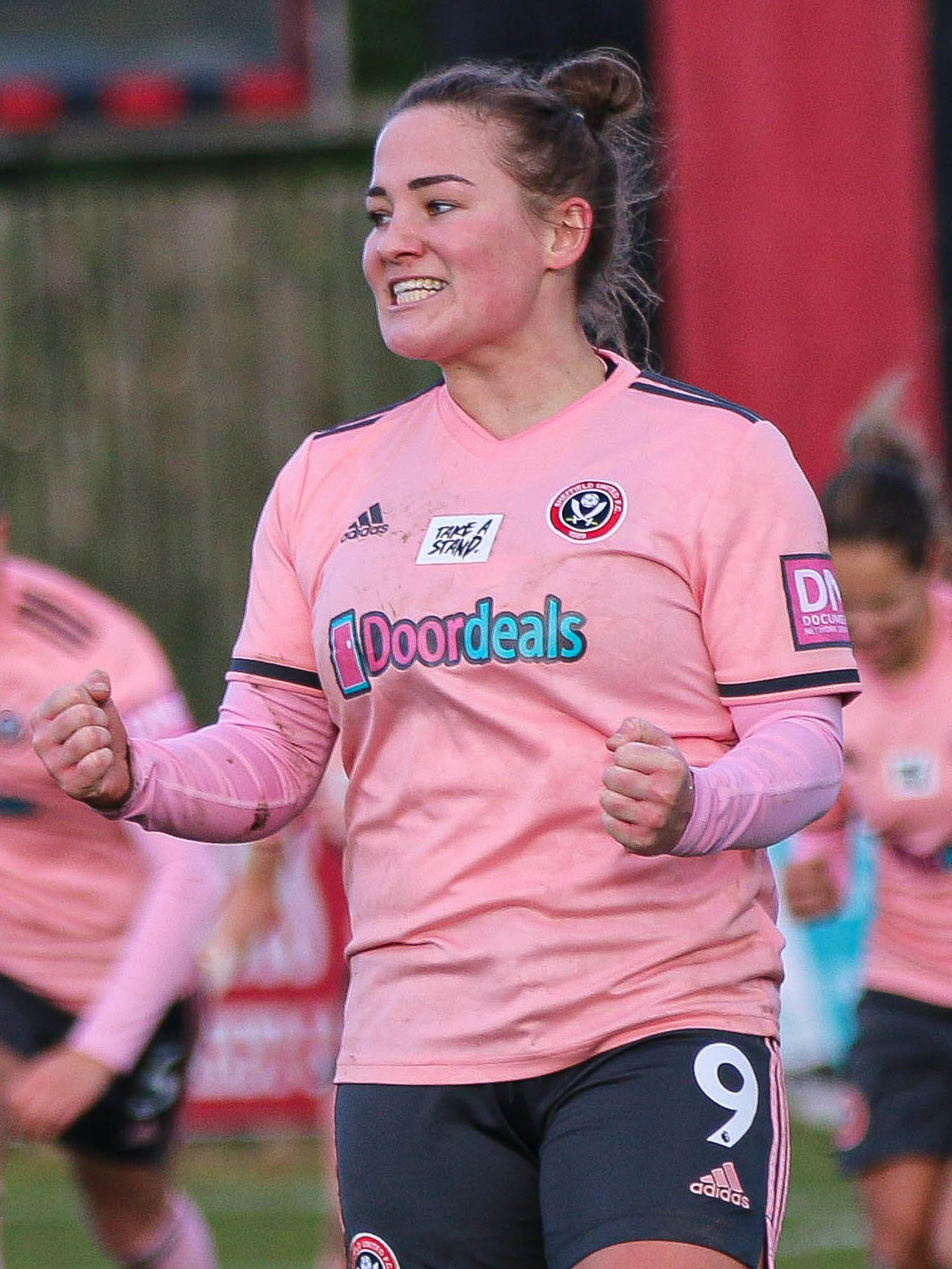
- Wilkinson with Sheffield United in 2021

Personal information
- Full name: Katie Wilkinson
- Date of birth: 5 November 1994 (age 32)
- Place of birth: Grimsby, England
- Position: Forward

Team information
- Current team: Rangers
- Number: 44

Youth career
- Aston Villa

Senior career*
Years	Team	Apps	(Gls)
2013–2014	Birmingham City	11	(1)
2014–2017	Aston Villa	5	(6)
2017–2019	London Bees	25	(10)
2019–2021	Sheffield United	34	(33)
2021–2022	Coventry United	22	(7)
2022–2024	Southampton	40	(15)
2024–	Rangers	62	(75)

International career
2011	England U17	5	(0)
- * Club domestic league appearances and goals as of 16:54, 23 August 2026 (UTC)

Katie Wilkinson (born 5 November 1994) is an English footballer who plays as a forward for Scottish Women's Premier League club Rangers. She previously played for Birmingham City, Aston Villa, London Bees, Sheffield United, Coventry United and Southampton in the English leagues (mainly the Women's Super League 2 / Women's Championship) before joining Rangers in 2024.

== Club career ==
=== Birmingham City Women ===
Wilkinson made her senior debut in 2013 in the Women's Super League (WSL) for Birmingham City Women. The forward came on from the bench in a 1–1 draw against Notts County Ladies. During the remainder of the 2013 WSL Season, she made nine more appearances, three of which were starts. Her first senior goal, and only goal of the season came against Doncaster Rovers Belles. She scored the opening goal in a 3–0 victory away from home.

During the 2014 WSL Season, Wilkinson only made one league appearance, which came against Everton in a 0–0 draw at home. In the Women's Super Cup, she made two appearances, one against Yeovil United where she scored the opening goal in a 2–1 win, and the other against Aston Villa Women.

=== Aston Villa Women ===
During the 2014 campaign, Wilkinson joined Aston Villa women on loan until the end of the season. She quickly established herself in the team, and scored the winning brace against Oxford Women in a 2–1 victory. Aston Villa finished fourth during the 2014 WSL 2 campaign, and her performances meant her time at the club was extended.

In the summer of 2016, Wilkinson suffered a major injury to her right ankle, where she broke five ligaments. The injury kept her out for the remainder of the season.

She made a return for the 2017/18 season, and made five appearances, four coming from the bench but failed to score in any of these appearances.

=== London Bees ===
In January 2018, Wilkinson signed for London Bees. In the remainder of the 2017–18 season, she made 12 appearances and scored eight goals. Her first appearance for her new club came against her former club, Aston Villa, in a 3–3 draw. She came off the bench and clinched the equalising goal in the 90th minute of the game, earning a point for her new side. She also scored a brace against Watford Ladies, in a 4–0 win away from home. The impact Wilkinson made was recognised as she won the May 2018 WSL 2 Player of the Month. London Bees finished the 2017/18 season in sixth place, three places above former club Aston Villa who ended the season in ninth.

In Wilkinson's first full season for London Bees, she made 13 appearances, however only managed to score twice. Her two goals throughout the season came against Leicester City Women, and Crystal Palace Women, both were in 2–1 wins for London Bees.

=== Sheffield United Women ===
Wilkinson's performances earned herself a move to Sheffield United, where she was announced as vice captain for the South Yorkshire club. She made her Sheffield United debut against Aston Villa, and also opened her account in a 3–2 loss away from home. She remained in fine goal scoring form throughout the season, and registered braces against Leicester, and both fixtures against Coventry City Ladies. In the reverse fixture against Leicester, Wilkinson scored a hat-trick in a victory away from home. Her end product for the 2018–19 season was 15 goals in 14 appearances. The season's cancellation meant Sheffield missed out on promotion to the WSL to Aston Villa, who finished six points clear. Wilkinson's performances earned her the FA Women's Championship Player of the Season, as well as the FA Women's Championship Golden Boot.

In the following season, Wilkinson picked up where she left off scoring 16 goals in 17 appearances, and also won the February 2021 FA Women's Championship Player of the Month award.

=== Rangers ===
In her first season in Scotland, Wilkinson scored 39 goals in 32 Scottish Women's Premier League games and was named in the 2024–25 PFA Scotland SWPL Team of the Year. Rangers narrowly missed out on the league title to Hibernian, but won both the SWPL Cup (Wilkinson opened the scoring in the 5–0 win over Hibs in the final) and the Women's Scottish Cup (Wilkinson assisted the second in the 3–0 victory over Glasgow City at Hampden Park). On 29 March 2026 she scored in the 89th minute of a 2–1 loss to Glasgow City in the final of the 2025–26 SWPL Cup.
