= Durham W.F.C. =

Durham Women F.C.
- Full name: Durham Women Football Club
- Nickname: The Wildcats
- Founded: 2014
- Ground: Maiden Castle, Durham; Mariners Park, South Shields F.C. (League Cup fixtures)
- Capacity: 2,400 (300 seats) (Maiden Castle); 4,000 (1,100 seats) (Mariners Park)
- Coordinates: 54°46′3″N 1°33′28″W; Maiden Castle
- Owners: Lee Sanders, Dawn Hepple, Patrick Connolly and Frances Connolly
- Head Coach: Willie Kirk
- League: Women's Super League 2
- 2025–26: WSL 2, 10th of 12
- Website: durhamwfc.co.uk

Durham Women Football Club is a women's football club based in Durham, Northern England. Since 2014 the team has competed in the Women's Super League 2 (WSL2), the second tier of Women's football in England, having been awarded a licence in its inaugural season. They play most of their home games at Maiden Castle, part of Durham University, with League Cup matches played at Mariners Park, South Shields F.C.

== History ==
Durham W.F.C. was founded in 2014 as a collaboration between South Durham & Cestria Girls and Durham University. Prior to that, Cestria, founded in 2006 as a youth team by Lee Sanders, had become perennial achievers, winning the World Peace Cup in Oslo in 2010 and finishing runners-up at the 2011 Gothia World Youth Cup. In their only season as a senior side before the merger Cestria won the 2012–13 Northern Combination Women's Football League. Sanders, in conjunction with Quentin Sloper, head of sport at Durham University, then created Durham W.F.C in time for the 2014 FA WSL expansion.

Durham's first competitive matches were in the 2013–14 FA Women's Cup where they reached the fifth round. The team's first league game was held on 17 April 2014, a 4–2 defeat against local rivals Sunderland at their New Ferens Park home. The Wildcats secured their first league victory away at London Bees, with a 1–0 win at The Hive Stadium. Despite a difficult start to the 2014 season, the Wildcats finished 6th. They won five, drew three and lost ten of their eighteen games.

2015 saw a much improved season for the Wildcats, including a better points total, albeit achieving a lower league finish, 7th place a reward for an injury-ravaged season. However 2016, saw Durham really hit their stride, with the Wildcats competing for promotion up until the final weeks of the season. The signings of Sarah Robson, Becky Salicki and Emily Roberts among others proved a catalyst as the Wildcats excelled throughout 2016. A record-breaking season eventually ended in a 4th-place finish with a highest-ever points total. They were also awarded the 'FA WSL 2 Club of the Year' award at the 2017 FA Women's Football Awards.

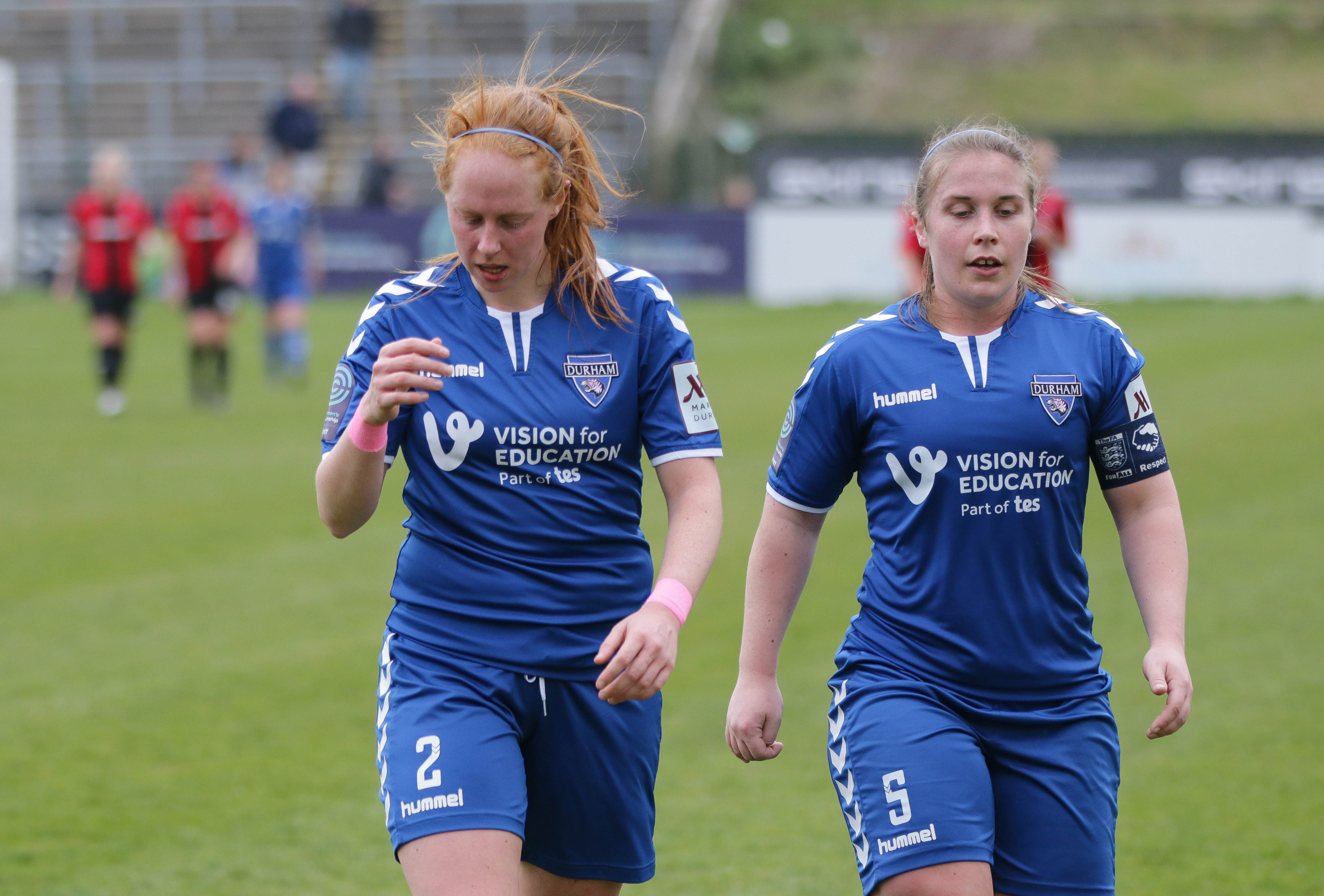
Kathryn Hill (2) and captain Sarah Wilson (5) in March 2019

2017–18 was the Wildcats best ever season, finishing 4th, gaining 35 points in the process and only two points off second place. Durham also enjoyed their best ever FA Women's Cup run, reaching the quarter-finals before losing to Everton. 2018–19 started well for the Wildcats, including a Continental Cup win over FA WSL side Everton and a 0–0 draw away at newly-formed Manchester United. Durham won 3–1 in the Home League fixture, thus becoming the first team to beat the Red Devils. 2018–19 also saw the Wildcats reach their second successive FA Cup quarter-final before narrowly losing 1–0 to Chelsea in front of a record attendance of 1,629.

Durham Hospitals Radio have broadcast all home matches since 2014 via their website to Durham Hospital (UHND) and around the world; with John Middleton providing the vast majority of the commentaries. In October 2020, Durham Women became one of 41 clubs to be founding signatories of the Football Association’s Football Leadership Diversity Code (including two others from the Women's Championship). The club transitioned from a hybrid training model to a full-time professional training model ahead of the 2023–24 Women's Championship season.

In 2025, Durham University sold the club to club director Lee Sanders, co-director Dawn Hepple, and investors and long-term club supporters Patrick and Frances Connolly.

On 14 September 2025, the club had its first player reach the milestone of scoring 100 goals for the club, as Beth Hepple scored in a 1–2 loss to Charlton Athletic.

On 8 June 2026, the club announced that it did "not have suﬃcient funds to operate in a fully compliant way in the Barclays Women's Super League 2 for the 2026-27 season" and that the club would cease operations if there was not further investment or a new buyer of the club within 21 days of the announcement. On 23 June 2026 it was announced that South Shields FC co-owner Geoff Thompson, with financial support from Jason Ye, had reached an agreement to purchase a majority stake in Durham W.F.C.

On 7 July 2026, the Durham named Willie Kirk as head coach, with previous head coach Adam Furness moving to a different role in the club.

== Players ==
=== Current squad ===
As of 28 October 2026

Note: Flags indicate national team as defined under FIFA eligibility rules; some limited exceptions apply. Players may hold more than one non-FIFA nationality.

No.	Pos.	Nation	Player
2	DF	ENG	Grace Ayre
3	DF	ENG	Lauren Briggs
4	DF	AUS	Madison McComasky
5	DF	ENG	Sarah Wilson (captain)
6	DF	ENG	Ella Wilson
7	MF	ENG	Beth Hepple
9	FW	ENG	Lucy Watson
10	MF	ENG	Grace Ede
11	FW	ENG	Jade Pennock
13	GK	ENG	Anna King
14	DF	ENG	Becky Salicki

No.	Pos.	Nation	Player
15	MF	IRL	Dee Bradley
17	FW	ENG	Olivia Fergusson
18	FW	ENG	Angela Addison
19	FW	SCO	Bayley Hutchison
20	MF	NZL	Michaela Foster
21	MF	ENG	Amber-Keegan Stobbs
22	FW	ENG	Grace Collinson
23	MF	AUS	Rachel Lowe
24	MF	SCO	Eloise Morran
25	DF	ENG	Emma Brown
35	GK	USA	Catriona Sheppard

== Club staff ==
As of 28 September 2024

Head of Football	Lee Sanders
First Team Head Coach	Willie Kirk
First Team Assistant Coach	George Anthony
Goalkeeping Coach	Jon Collinson
Physiotherapist	Nat Gutteridge
Club doctor	Dougal Southward
Strength and conditioning Coach	
Sports scientist	Simon Fairbairn

== Records ==
As of 8 May 2025

- Record attendance: 2,381 vs Manchester City W.F.C., 14 January 2024
- Record appearance maker: Beth Hepple, 272
- Record goalscorer: Beth Hepple, 100

=== Season summary ===
Results of league and cup competitions by season
Season	Division	P	W	D	L	F	A	Pts	Pos	FA Cup	League Cup	Name	Goals
Season	League									FA Cup	League Cup	Top goalscorer (Note: Goals in all competitions (League, FA Cup and League Cup are counted))	
2014	WSL 2	18	5	3	10	19	32	18	6th	Fifth round	Group stage	Caroline Dixon	5
2015	WSL 2	18	6	2	10	24	32	20	7th	Third round	Group stage	Courtney Corrie	5
2016	WSL 2	18	10	3	5	30	19	33	4th	Fifth round	Preliminary round	Beth Hepple	14
2017 (Note: Shortened Spring Series: teams only played each other once and there was no WSL Cup)	WSL 2	9	5	1	3	14	10	16	5th	Fourth round	N/A	Zoe Ness	5
2017–18	WSL 2	18	11	2	5	44	26	35	4th	Quarter-final	Group stage	Beth Hepple	11
2018–19	Championship	20	11	6	3	37	16	39	4th	Quarter-final	Group stage	Beth Hepple	8
2019–20 (Note: Season curtailed due to the COVID-19 pandemic)	Championship	14	10	2	2	33	10	32	3rd	Fourth round	Group stage	Beth Hepple	10
2020–21	Championship	20	12	6	2	34	15	42	2nd	Fourth round	Quarter-finals	Beth Hepple	10
2021–22	Championship	22	10	4	8	30	28	34	6th	Fifth round	Group stage	Beth Hepple	10
2022–23	Championship	22	8	4	10	30	29	28	7th	Fifth round	Group stage	Rio Hardy	9
2023–24	Championship	22	6	5	11	24	44	23	9th	Fourth round	Group stage	Amy Andrews	9
2024–25	Championship	22	11	3	6	35	27	36	4th	Fourth round	Quarter-finals	Mollie Lambert	8
2025–26	Championship	22	5	7	10	27	35	22	10th	Third round	Group stage	Beth Hepple	9

== Durham Cestria ==
Durham Cestria are an official partner club who compete in the FA Women's National League Division One North. The club won the 2016–17 North East Regional Northern Division, followed two years later by the 2018–19 North East Regional Premier Division.

== Honours ==
League

- Northern Combination Football League (level 3)
  - Champions: 2012–13

== See also ==
- Middlesbrough F.C. Women
- Newcastle United W.F.C.
- Sunderland A.F.C. Women
