= Women's Super League 2 =

- Organising body: WSL Football
- First season: 2014
- Country: England
- Number of clubs: 12
- Level on pyramid: 2
- Promotion to: Women's Super League
- Relegation to: National League North; National League South
- Domestic cup: Women's FA Cup
- League cup: WSL Players Cup
- Current champions: Birmingham City (2026–27)
- Most championships: Eleven teams (1 title each)
- Website: www.wslfootball.com
- Current: 2026–27 Women's Super League 2

The Women's Super League 2, also known as Barclays Women's Super League 2 for sponsorship reasons, is a professional football league in England, operated by WSL Football. It is the second-highest division of women's football in England. The division was established in 2014 as the WSL 2 and was later rebranded as the FA Women's Championship prior to the 2018–19 season. "The FA" was subsequently dropped from the league name ahead of the 2022–23 season, prior to new ownership for the 2024–25 season by clubs in the first and second tiers. Before the start of the 2025–26 season, the league was rebranded again under its current name, the Women's Super League 2.

WSL 2 replaced the previous level 2 division, the FA Women's Premier League (WPL) National Division, which ended after the 2012–13 season. The WPL's last national division champions, Sunderland, were not promoted and also became the first winners of WSL 2 in the 2014 season. In addition to Sunderland, other WPL clubs that joined WSL 2 in 2014 were Watford and Aston Villa. From 2014 to 2016, WSL 2 ran a summer-based season calendar before reverting to the winter season in 2017–18, the same as WSL 1. Having sponsored the first tier since the 2019–20 season, 2022–23 marked the first season of Barclays as the title partner of the division.

For the 2023–24 season, changes were made so that two clubs would be relegated from the league allowing two team each from National League North and South to be promoted to the Championship rather than having to play a season end playoff. This change resulted in two teams being relegated from the Championship at the end of the season. No changes were made to promotion from the league to the WSL with still only one promotion and one relegation respectively. For the 2024–25 season, the league was reduced to eleven teams, due to Reading's withdrawal from the Championship, citing financial issues. Ahead of the 2025–26 season, the two relegation spots were introduced again as the league returned to a twelve-team format.

== History ==
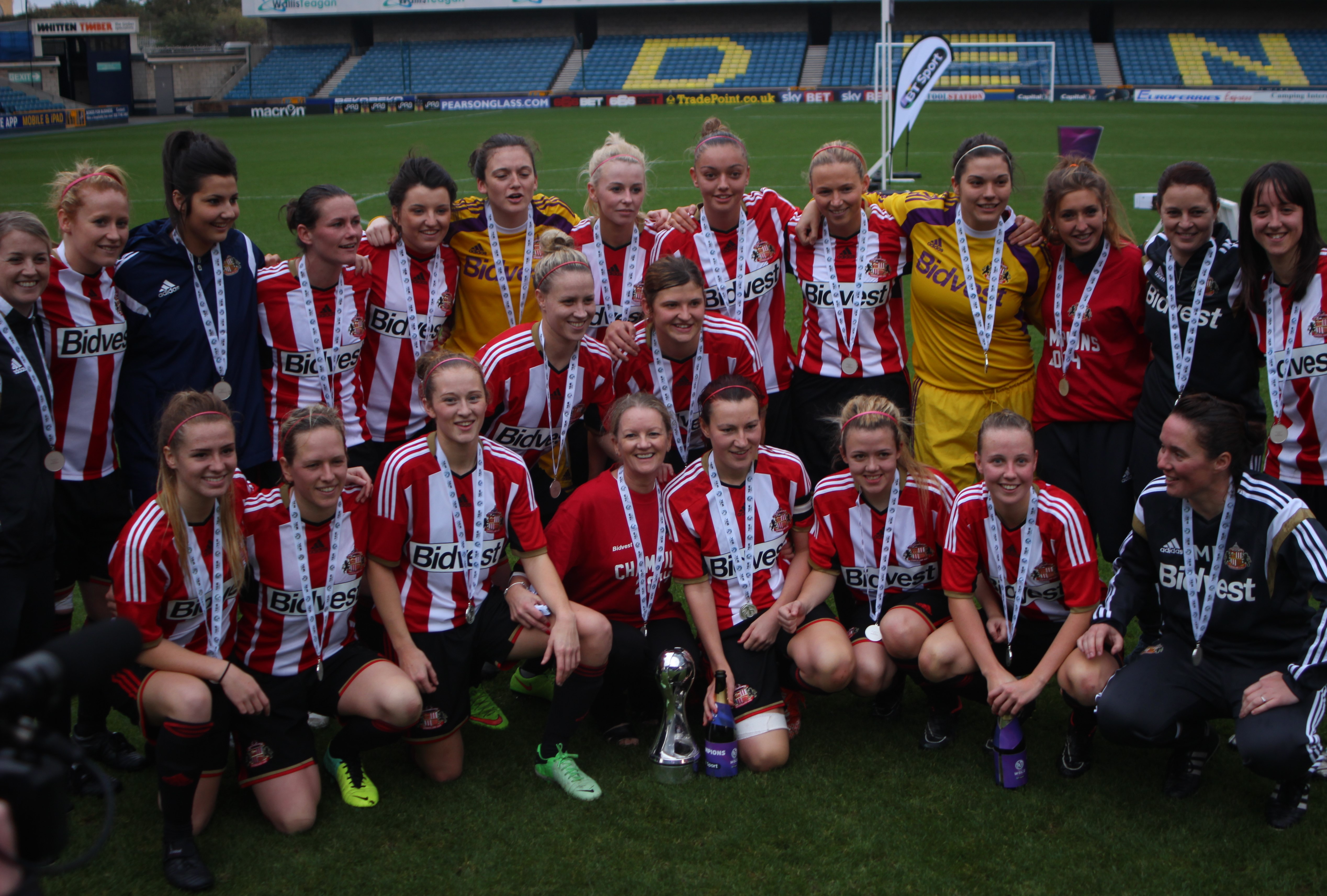
Sunderland AFC Ladies won the FA WSL 2 in 2014

For the 2014 season, the FA Women's Super League was expanded to create a second division with nine new teams added and one team being relegated from the WSL 1. WSL 1 remained as eight teams, with one new team inserted, with the WSL 2 having ten teams.

The new WSL 1 licence was awarded to Manchester City in 2014. Doncaster Rovers Belles were relegated to WSL 2, with nine new licences awarded to London Bees, Durham, Aston Villa, Millwall Lionesses, Yeovil Town, Reading, Sunderland, Watford, and Oxford United. Doncaster Belles appealed against their demotion, but were unsuccessful.

In December 2014, the FA WSL announced a two-year plan to expand WSL 1 from an eight to ten-team league. Two teams would be promoted from WSL 2, while one team would be relegated to WSL 2. Also, for the first time, a team would earn promotion to WSL 2 from the Women's Premier League (now National League), effectively connecting the WSL to the rest of the English women's football pyramid.

This left WSL 1 with nine teams and WSL 2 with ten teams for the 2016 season, and with the process repeated the following year, both WSL 1 and WSL 2 consisted of ten teams each for the 2017–18 season. In addition to being able to prove their financial solvency, clubs applying for entry to the WSL had to show they would attract an average of 350 spectators in 2016, increasing to at least 400 in 2017.

FA WSL 2 was renamed the Women's Championship prior to the 2018–19 season. The WPLL then made the decision to rebrand the Women's Championship back to WSL 2; it will be known as such from the beginning of the 2025–26 season.

In May 2020 the Championship season was halted due to the COVID-19 pandemic. In 2022 the league was renamed to simply the Women's Championship, with the FA part being dropped.

In November 2023, it was announced that all 24 Women's Super League and Women's Championship clubs had unanimously agreed to form a new organisation to run the women's professional game in England, taking over from the FA. The organization is called NewCo, and Nikki Doucet has been named CEO. From the 2024–25 season, the company was known as the Women's Professional Leagues Limited (WPLL).

On 23 March 2025, Newcastle United W.F.C. and Sunderland A.F.C Women set a new attendance record of 38,502 in the Women's Championship in their second meeting in the league, a Tyne-Wear derby match played at St James' Park in Newcastle. The previous record had been an attendance of 15,387 set in 2024 in the reverse fixture in the same season.

== Finances ==
WSL2 club financials (accounts ending in 2025)
Club	Expenditure (£)	Income (£)	Pre-tax profit/loss (£)
Birmingham	5,963,381	6,104,461	141,080
Bristol City	2,255,523	1,190,166	-1,065,357
London City Lionesses	11,495,034	918,725	-10,576,309
Newcastle United	4,847,033	962,515	-3,884,518
Sheffield United	1,909,403	1,908,473	-930
Southampton	3,337,377	1,367,734	-1,969,643
Sunderland	1,420,436	882,185	-538,251

After its acquisition by Women's Professional Leagues Limited (WPLL) in August 2024, the WSL2 transitioned to an independent, club-owned financial model. In its first year ending July 2025, the league reported an anticipated £8.2 million operating loss on £17.4 million in revenue, supported by a loan from the Premier League. However, WSL Football claimed its revenue had tripled between August 2024 and January 2026. A key feature of this new model was the introduction of mandatory minimum salaries across the top two tiers to ensure player sustainability. However, reporting by The Guardian highlighted that minimum pay for under-23 players in the WSL2 still falls below the National Living Wage.

== Clubs ==
The following twelve clubs are competing in the 2026–27 season.

Team	Location	Ground	Capacity	2025–26 season
Bristol City	Bristol	Ashton Gate	27,000	4th
Burnley	Burnley	Turf Moor	21,944	WNL North, 1st
Durham	Durham	Maiden Castle	1,800 (League) 2,400 (Cup)	10th
Ipswich Town	Colchester	Colchester Community Stadium	10,105	9th
Leicester City	Leicester	King Power	33,000	WSL, 12th
Newcastle United	Gateshead	Gateshead International Stadium	11,800	6th
Nottingham Forest	Nottingham	City Ground	31,042	7th
Sheffield United	Sheffield	Bramall Lane	32,050	11th
Southampton	Southampton	St Mary's Stadium	32,384	5th
Sunderland	Hetton-le-Hole	Eppleton CW	2,500	8th
Watford	Watford FC	Vicarage Road Stadium	22,000	WNL South, 1st
Wolverhampton	Wellington	New Bucks Head	6,300	WNL North, 2nd

Location of clubs for the 2026–27 season

== Winners ==
Unless noted, only the winners were promoted to the Women's Super League.

Year	Winner	Runners-up	Third	Top scorers	Goals
2014	Sunderland	Doncaster Rovers Belles	Reading	Fran Kirby (Reading)	24
2015	Reading	Doncaster Rovers Belles ^{p}	Everton	Courtney Sweetman-Kirk (Doncaster Rovers Belles)	20
2016	Yeovil Town	Bristol City ^{p}	Everton	Iniabasi Umotong (Oxford United); Jo Wilson (London Bees)	13
Spring Series (Note: The shortened 2017 edition was known as the Spring Series and ran from February to May 2017.)	Everton	Doncaster Rovers Belles	Millwall Lionesses	Courtney Sweetman-Kirk (Doncaster Rovers Belles)	9
2017–18	Doncaster Rovers Belles ^{r}	Brighton & Hove Albion ^{p}	Millwall Lionesses	Jessica Sigsworth (Doncaster Rovers Belles)	15
2018–19	Manchester United	Tottenham Hotspur ^{p}	Charlton Athletic	Jessica Sigsworth (Manchester United)	17
2019–20	Aston Villa	Sheffield United	Durham	Katie Wilkinson (Sheffield United)	15
2020–21	Leicester City	Durham	Liverpool	Katie Wilkinson (Sheffield United)	19
2021–22	Liverpool	London City Lionesses	Bristol City	Abi Harrison (Bristol City)	17
2022–23	Bristol City	Birmingham City	London City Lionesses	Melissa Johnson (Charlton Athletic)	12
2023–24	Crystal Palace	Charlton Athletic	Sunderland	Elise Hughes (Crystal Palace)	16
2024–25	London City Lionesses	Birmingham City	Charlton Athletic	Isobel Goodwin (London City Lionesses)	16
2025–26	Birmingham City	Crystal Palace ^{p}	Charlton Athletic ^{po}	Lexi Lloyd-Smith (Bristol City)	11

Notes

p.Second-placed team was also promoted
r.Withdrew from the league and relegated
po.Promoted after winning a play-off
