= 2025–26 Sunderland A.F.C. Women season =

English football club season

Sunderland Women
2025–26 season
- Chairman: Kyril Louis-Dreyfus
- Head coach: Melanie Reay
- Stadium: Eppleton Colliery Welfare Ground
- WSL2: 8th
- FA Cup: Fourth round
- League Cup: Group Stage
- Top goalscorer: League: Emily Scarr (6); Katie Kitching (6); All: Emily Scarr (7)
- Highest home attendance: 10,156 vs Newcastle United (Women's Super League 2)
- Lowest home attendance: 210 vs Nottingham Forest
- Average home league attendance: 1,588
- Biggest win: 4-0 vs Sheffield United (Women's Super League 2)
- Biggest defeat: 0–5 vs Liverpool (Women's League Cup)
Home colours	Away colours	Third colours

The 2025–26 season was the 36th season in the history of Sunderland A.F.C. Women and their fifth consecutive season in the Women's Super League 2, and their first since the league reverted to the WSL 2 name. The club participated in the Women's Super League 2, the Women's FA Cup, and the Women's League Cup.

In the first half of the season the team struggled with inconsistent form. Following a strong start where they picked up eight points from the first four games, the team only picked up another two points over the next seven fixtures. By the halfway point of the season, Sunderland sat in eighth place, in the lower half of the league, with negative goal difference and having suffered a bruising loss in the Tyne–Wear derby to Newcastle United.

In the second half of the season, the Lasses continued to struggle with inconsistent form. Despite going five home games unbeaten during the backend of the season, a failure to turn draws into wins resulted in an 8th-place finish.

On 7 April 2026, it was announced that multi-club ownership organisation Bay Collective had reached an agreement to acquire a majority stake in Sunderland Women. Led by former Football Association director Kay Cossington, Bay Collective are the majority owners of NWSL club Bay FC.

== Transfers ==
With the potential of up to three teams promoted to the Women's Super League as part of the expansion of the top tier, Eleanor Dale, Katie Kitching, Libbi McInnes, Katy Watson and Ellen Jones signed new contracts at the club ahead of the new season. Sunderland bolstered their squad with the signings of Hannah Greenwood and the international quintet of Rhiannon Roberts, Reanna Blades, Grace Moloney, Jamie Finn, and Izzy Atkinson. In the final days of the transfer window, three loanees were added to the squad.

In January, the three loanees of Keira Barry, Evie Rabjohn and Tara O'Hanlon returned to their parent clubs.

On 3 February 2026, Sunderland announced the loan signings of Mared Griffiths and Caragh Hamilton to bolster the squad.

=== In ===
Date	Pos.	Player	From	Ref.
1 July 2025	CB	(Wales) Rhiannon Roberts	(Spain) Real Betis	
2 July 2025	RW	(Jamaica) Reanna Blades	(England) Burnley	
11 July 2025	GK	(Republic of Ireland) Grace Moloney	(England) London City Lionesses	
18 July 2025	CB	(England) Hannah Greenwood	(England) Newcastle United	
24 July 2025	CM	(Republic of Ireland) Jamie Finn	(England) Birmingham City	
31 July 2025	LB	(Republic of Ireland) Izzy Atkinson	(England) Crystal Palace	

=== Out ===
Date	Pos.	Player	To	Ref.
1 July 2025	CB	(England) Amy Goddard	(England) Southampton	
4 July 2025	LB	(England) Grace Ede	(England) Durham	
8 July 2025	GK	(England) Megan Borthwick	(England) Middlesbrough	
24 July 2025	RW	(Wales) Mary McAteer	(England) Charlton Athletic	
31 July 2025	CM	(England) Jenna Dear	(England) Ipswich Town	

=== Loaned in ===
Date	Pos.	Player	From	Date until	Ref.
3 September 2025	ST	(England) Keira Barry	(England) Manchester United	31 December 2025	
4 September 2025	CB	(England) Evie Rabjohn	(England) Manchester United	5 January 2026	
4 September 2025	LB	(Republic of Ireland) Tara O'Hanlon	(England) Manchester City	31 December 2025	
3 February 2026	CM	(Wales) Mared Griffiths	(England) Manchester United	End of season	
3 February 2026	RB	(Northern Ireland) Caragh Hamilton	(England) Nottingham Forest	End of season	

=== Retired / Out of Contract ===
Date	Pos.	Player	Subsequent club	Ref.
1 July 2025	RB	(England) Megan Beer	Retired	
1 July 2025	CB	(England) Grace McCatty	Retired	

== Pre-season and friendlies ==
On 16 July 2025, Sunderland announced their first slate of pre-season fixtures, against Middlesbrough, Celtic, Rangers, and Nottingham Forest. Games against Leicester City and Bristol City were later added to the schedule.

Win Draw Loss Fixtures

20 July 2025 Friendly	Middlesbrough	Postponed	Sunderland	Stockton-on-Tees
				Stadium: Bishopton Road West
Note: This game was postponed by Sunderland on 17 July 2025 due to "an illness in camp."

3 August 2025 Friendly	Sunderland	2–0	Celtic	Hetton-le-Hole
14:00 BST	Dale 1'; Watson 82'	Report		Stadium: Eppleton CW; Attendance: 0 (Behind-closed-doors)

6 August 2025 Friendly	Rangers	0–4	Sunderland	Cumbernauld
		Report	Watson 9', 12', 28'; Kitching 20'	Stadium: Broadwood Stadium

10 August 2025 Friendly	Sunderland	?–?	Nottingham Forest
				Attendance: 0 (Behind-closed-doors)
Note: While this fixture was announced on 16 July 2025, no details of the match were shared by either club. It is unclear whether this match went ahead. It is also unknown where this match was played.

20 August 2025 Friendly	Sunderland	1–1	Leicester City
	Jones 73'	Report	? 70'	Attendance: 0 (Behind-closed-doors)
Note: It is unknown where this match was played.

24 August 2025 Friendly	Sunderland	1–1	Bristol City	Cleadon
	Atkinson 20'	Report	Hardy 25'	Stadium: Academy of Light; Attendance: 0 (Behind-closed-doors)

== Competitions ==
=== Overall record ===
Competition	First match	Last match	Starting round	Final position	Record							
Competition	First match	Last match	Starting round	Final position	Pld	W	D	L	GF	GA	GD	Win %
WSL2	5 September 2025	2 May 2026	Matchday 1	8th	22	6	6	10	28	35	−7	27.27
FA Cup	14 December 2025	17 January 2026	Third round	Fourth round	2	1	0	1	5	2	+3	50.00
League Cup	24 September 2025	23 November 2025	Group stage	Group Stage	3	0	1	2	1	7	−6	0.00
Total					27	7	7	13	34	44	−10	25.93

Last updated: 2 May 2026
Source: Competitions

=== Women's Super League 2 ===
==== League table ====
Pos	Team	Pld	W	D	L	GF	GA	GD	Pts
6	Newcastle United	22	8	9	5	32	25	+7	33
7	Nottingham Forest	22	9	3	10	27	35	−8	30
8	Sunderland	22	6	6	10	28	35	−7	24
9	Ipswich Town	22	6	5	11	26	42	−16	23
10	Durham	22	5	7	10	27	35	−8	22

Source: WSL 2 League Table
Rules for classification: 1) Points; 2) Goal difference; 3) Number of goals scored

==== Results summary ====
Overall								Home						Away					
Pld	W	D	L	GF	GA	GD	Pts	W	D	L	GF	GA	GD	W	D	L	GF	GA	GD
22	6	6	10	28	35	−7	24	3	4	4	15	18	−3	3	2	6	13	17	−4

==== Results by matchday ====
Matchday	1	2	3	4	5	6	7	8	9	10	11	13	14	12^{1}	16^{3}	17	15^{2}	18	19	20	21	22
Result	W	D	W	D	L	D	L	L	L	L	W	W	L	W	D	L	D	W	D	L	L	L
Position	3	4	2	3	6	5	7	8	10	11	8	8	8	8	8	8	7	7	8	8	8	8
Points	3	4	7	8	8	9	9	9	9	9	12	15	15	18	19	19	20	23	24	24	24	24

Source: WSL2
W = Win; D = Draw; L = Loss
Notes:
- ^{1} Matchday 12 (vs Durham) was postponed due to adverse weather conditions.
- ^{2} Matchday 15 (vs Sheffield United) was postponed due to a waterlogged pitch.
- ^{3} Matchday 16 (vs Nottingham Forest) was postponed due to a waterlogged pitch.

==== Matches ====
5 September 2025 1	Sheffield United	0–4	Sunderland	Sheffield
18:00 BST		Report	Atkinson 40'; Roberts 52'; Kitching 80'; Scarr (yellow card) 90', (goal) 90+6'	Stadium: Bramall Lane; Attendance: 885; Referee: Levi Gray

14 September 2025 2	Sunderland	1–1	Birmingham City	Sunderland
14:00 BST	Scarr 60'; Finn (yellow card) 74'; Corbyn (yellow card) 75'	Report	Sarri 63'	Stadium: Stadium of Light; Attendance: 753; Referee: Phoebe Cross

19 September 2025 3	Sunderland	2–1	Durham	Hetton-le-Hole
19:00 BST	Fenton (yellow card) 46'; Scarr 53'; Kitching (yellow card) 85'	Report	Lambert (yellow card) 56'; Hepple 88'; Wilson (yellow card) 90+5'	Stadium: Eppleton CW; Attendance: 903; Referee: Sophie Dennington

28 September 2025 4	Southampton	1–1	Sunderland	Havant
12:00 BST	Peplow 45+4'; Ferguson (yellow card) 56'; Primus (yellow card) 76'	Report	Watson 19'; Roberts (yellow card) 45+4'; Sheva (yellow card) 75'	Stadium: Westleigh Park; Attendance: 1,367; Referee: Ella Broad

5 October 2025 5	Sunderland	0–2	Charlton Athletic	Sunderland
14:00 BST		Report	Hutton 19', 68'	Stadium: Stadium of Light; Attendance: 1,745; Referee: Aimee Keir

12 October 2025 6	Crystal Palace	1–1	Sunderland	Sutton, London
12:00 BST	Howat 12'; Nolan (yellow card) 12'	Report	Watson 9'	Stadium: Gander Green Lane; Attendance: 605; Referee: Jade Wardle

2 November 2025 7	Sunderland	2–4	Bristol City	Hetton-le-Hole
14:00 GMT	Kitching 43'; Corbyn 45+1'; Greenwood (yellow card) 87'	Report	Sáez 14'; Lawley 18'; Lloyd-Smith 24'; Hardy (yellow card) 56'; Syme 88' (pen.)	Stadium: Eppleton CW; Attendance: 487; Referee: Jodie Hunter

9 November 2025 8	Sunderland	2–3	Portsmouth	Hetton-le-Hole
14:00 GMT	Scarr 25', 79'	Report	Hornby 30', 90+8', (yellow card) 31'; Barker (red card) 80'; Gale 90+3'	Stadium: Eppleton CW; Attendance: 426; Referee: Ruby Sykes

16 November 2025 9	Newcastle United	3–1	Sunderland	Newcastle upon Tyne
14:00 GMT	Mannion (yellow card) 58'; Cooper 63'; Murphy 66', 78'; Stokes (yellow card) 73'	Report	Fenton (yellow card) 31'; Corbyn (yellow card) 48'; Dale (penalty missed) 53'; Barry 68'	Stadium: St James' Park; Attendance: 18,972; Referee: Phoebe Cross

7 December 2025 10	Nottingham Forest	3–1	Sunderland	West Bridgford
14:00 GMT	Boye-Hlorkah 19', 87', (yellow card) 90+6'; Claypole 31'; Stapleton (yellow card) 38'	Report	Scarr 69'	Stadium: City Ground; Attendance: 1,007; Referee: Levi Gray

21 December 2025 11	Sunderland	2–1	Ipswich Town	Hetton-le-Hole
14:00 GMT	Scarr (yellow card) 49'; Brown 75'; Atkinson 77'		Dean 19'; Guyatt (yellow card) 76'; Dear (yellow card) 68'	Stadium: Eppleton CW; Attendance: 403; Referee: Francesca Catchpole

25 January 2026 13	Sunderland	1–0	Southampton	Hetton-le-Hole
14:00 GMT	Fenton (yellow card) 36'; Dale 56', (yellow card) 80'; Kitching (yellow card) 70'	Report	Collett (yellow card) 55'	Stadium: Eppleton CW; Attendance: 392; Referee: Lucy May

30 January 2026 14	Bristol City	3–0	Sunderland	Bristol
19:00 GMT	Brown 2' (o.g.); Gale 39'; Dafeur (yellow card) 71'; Lloyd-Smith 83'	Report	Roberts (yellow card) 20'; Greenwood (yellow card) 20'	Stadium: Ashton Gate; Attendance: 1,797; Referee: Fabio Roque

20 February 2026 12	Durham	2–3	Sunderland	Durham
19:00 GMT	Lambert 42'; Jones (yellow card) 70'; McFarland 90+3'	Report	Kitching 64'; M. Grifffiths 81'; Scarr (yellow card) 90+1'; Sheva 90+1'	Stadium: Maiden Castle; Attendance: 1,219; Referee: Zac Kennard-Kettle
Note: Initial game scheduled for 11 January 2026 postponed due to adverse weather conditions.

11 March 2026 16	Sunderland	1–1	Nottingham Forest	Hetton-le-Hole
19:00 GMT	Kitching 35'; Sheva (yellow card) 69'; M. Grifffiths (yellow card) 80'; Dale (yellow card) 83'; Lambourne (yellow card) 90+3'	Report	Omewa (penalty missed) 64'; Claypole (penalty missed) 90+6', 90+6'	Stadium: Eppleton CW; Attendance: 210; Referee: Megan Wilson
Note: Initial game scheduled for 15 February 2026 postponed due to a waterlogged pitch.

15 March 2026 17	Charlton Athletic	1–0	Sunderland	Charlton
14:00 GMT	Thestrup 36', (yellow card) 50'; N'Dow (yellow card) 62'; Fitzgerald (yellow card) 85'	Report	L. Griffiths (yellow card) 17' (yellow-red card) 76'; Sheva (yellow card) 58'; Watson (yellow card) 68'	Stadium: The Valley; Attendance: 519; Referee: Julia Kings

18 March 2026 15	Sunderland	2–2	Sheffield United	Hetton-le-Hole
19:00 GMT	Kitching 57'; Sheva (yellow card) 61'; M. Griffiths (yellow card) 80'; Dale 90+4'	Report	Andrews 4', 90+9' (pen.); Devlin (yellow card) 55' (yellow-red card) 61'; Guyatt (yellow card) 85'	Stadium: Eppleton CW; Attendance: 212; Referee: Alice Parker
Note: Initial game scheduled for 6 February 2026 postponed due to a waterlogged pitch.

22 March 2026 18	Portsmouth	0–1	Sunderland	Portsmouth
14:00 GMT		Report	Dale 5'	Stadium: Fratton Park; Attendance: 1,293; Referee: Laura van Lier

29 March 2026 19	Sunderland	1–1	Newcastle United	Sunderland
14:00 BST	Watson 17'; Lambourne (yellow card) 73'; Fenton (yellow card) 79'; Sheva (yellow card) 84'	Report	Sevenius 81'	Stadium: Stadium of Light; Attendance: 10,156; Referee: Abigail Byrne

1 April 2026 20	Birmingham City	0–1	Sunderland	Bordesley
19:00 BST	Holloway (yellow card) 38'; Crosthwaite 90+3'; Herron (yellow card) 90+7'	Report	Westrup (yellow card) 90+2'	Stadium: St Andrew's Stadium; Attendance: 975; Referee: Stacey Pearson

26 April 2026 21	Sunderland	1–2	Crystal Palace	Sunderland
14:00 BST	Westrup (yellow card) 5'; Finn (yellow card) 45+4'; Watson 48'; Griffiths (yellow card) 85'	Report	Blanchard 20'; Weerden 31'	Stadium: Stadium of Light; Attendance: 1,785; Referee: Aaron Ford

2 May 2026 22	Ipswich Town	1–2	Sunderland	Myland
15:00 BST	Baker 13'; Weir 86'	Report	Roberts (yellow card) 57'; Dale 68'	Stadium: Colchester Community Stadium; Attendance: 1,008; Referee: Levi Gray

=== FA Cup ===
14 December 2024 Third round proper	Derby County	1-5	Sunderland	Mickleover
14:00 GMT	Muir 4'; Melrose (yellow card) 35' (yellow-red card) 60'	Report	Barry 9', 56'; Watson 13', 24'; Jones (yellow card) 32'; Brown (yellow card) 40'; Greenwood 63'	Stadium: The Don Amott Arena; Attendance: 338; Referee: Lee Hurst

17 January 2025 Fourth round proper	Sunderland	0-1	London City	Hetton-le-Hole
12:15 GMT	Fenton (yellow card) 73'; Atkinson (yellow card) 79'	Report	Pattinson (yellow card) 46'; Sangaré 50', (yellow card) 53'; Pérez (yellow card) 64'	Stadium: Eppleton CW; Attendance: 389; Referee: Adewunmi Soneye

=== League Cup ===
==== Group stage ====
Pos	Team	Pld	W	PW	PL	L	GF	GA	GD	Pts	Qualification
1	Liverpool	3	3	0	0	0	11	2	+9	9	Advanced to knockout stage
2	Sheffield United	3	1	1	0	1	3	5	−2	5	
3	Durham	3	0	0	2	1	3	4	−1	2	
4	Sunderland	3	0	1	0	2	1	7	−6	2	

Source: Women's League Cup
Rules for classification: 1) Points; 2) Goal difference; 3) Number of goals scored; 4) Number of wins; 5) Head-to-head record

24 September 2025 Group stage	Liverpool	5–0	Sunderland	St Helens
19:00 BST	Evans 7'; Clark 21', (yellow card) 83'; Shimizu 41'; Haug 71', 89'	Report		Stadium: St Helens Stadium; Attendance: 2,018; Referee: Abby Dearden

19 October 2025 Group stage	Sunderland	0–1	Sheffield United	Hetton-le-Hole
14:00 BST	Fenton (yellow card) 24'	Report	Andrews 39'; O'Rourke (yellow card) 60'; Foy (yellow card) 90+6'	Stadium: Eppleton CW; Attendance: 400; Referee: Jula Kings

23 November 2025 Group stage	Sunderland	1-1 (4–3 p)	Durham	Hetton-le-Hole
14:00 GMT	Scarr 50'; Barry (yellow card) 62'	Report	Ayre (yellow card) 18'; Robson (yellow card) 41'; Hepple 72'	Stadium: Eppleton CW; Attendance: 453; Referee: William Davis
	Penalties
	Fenton (penalty scored); Barry (penalty scored); Scarr (penalty scored); Westrup (penalty scored)		(penalty scored) Hepple; (penalty scored) Watson; (penalty scored) Foster; (penalty missed) Speckmaier; (penalty missed) Briggs

== Statistics ==
Italics indicate a loaned in player.

=== Appearances ===
As of 2 May 2026

Starting appearances are listed first, followed by substitute appearances after the + symbol where applicable.

No.	Pos	Nat	Player	Total		WSL2		FA Cup		League Cup	
No.	Pos	Nat	Player	Apps	Goals	Apps	Goals	Apps	Goals	Apps	Goals
1	GK	(England) ENG	Demi Lambourne	12	0	8	0	1	0	3	0
2	DF	(Republic of Ireland) IRL	Izzy Atkinson	10	2	5+4	2	0+1	0	0	0
3	DF	(England) ENG	Mary Corbyn	12	1	5+3	1	0+1	0	2+1	0
4	DF	(England) ENG	Hannah Greenwood	21	1	13+4	0	2	1	1+1	0
5	DF	(Wales) WAL	Rhiannon Roberts	19	1	17	1	2	0	0	0
6	DF	(England) ENG	Louise Griffiths	18	0	14	0	2	0	1+1	0
7	FW	(England) ENG	Katy Watson	27	6	21+1	4	1+1	2	0+3	0
8	FW	(England) ENG	Emily Scarr	26	7	18+4	6	1	0	1+2	1
9	FW	(England) ENG	Eleanor Dale	19	4	14+3	4	1	0	1	0
10	MF	(New Zealand) NZL	Katie Kitching	27	6	18+4	6	2	0	1+2	0
11	DF	(England) ENG	Jessica Brown	21	1	15+2	1	2	0	1+1	0
12	MF	(England) ENG	Emily Cassap	2	0	0+1	0	0+1	0	0	0
14	MF	(England) ENG	Natasha Fenton	26	0	21+1	0	1	0	3	0
16	GK	(Republic of Ireland) IRL	Grace Moloney	15	0	14	0	1	0	0	0
17	MF	(Republic of Ireland) IRL	Jamie Finn	19	0	8+7	0	1	0	3	0
18	MF	(England) ENG	Libbi McInnes	11	0	1+7	0	0+1	0	1+1	0
19	FW	(England) ENG	Keira Barry	12	3	3+6	1	1	2	2	0
20	FW	(Wales) WAL	Ellen Jones	15	0	0+11	0	1	0	3	0
21	MF	(Republic of Ireland) IRL	Marissa Sheva	23	1	18+1	1	2	0	1+1	0
22	DF	(Republic of Ireland) IRL	Tara O'Hanlon	3	0	2	0	0	0	1	0
24	DF	(Northern Ireland) NIR	Caragh Hamilton	6	0	6	0	0	0	0	0
25	DF	(England) ENG	Evie Rabjohn	6	0	1+2	0	0	0	3	0
26	MF	(Wales) WAL	Mared Griffiths	8	1	6+2	1	0	0	0	0
27	DF	(Scotland) SCO	Brianna Westrup	20	0	12+3	0	1+1	0	3	0
31	DF	(England) ENG	Chloe Paxton	2	0	2	0	0	0	0	0
32	FW	(England) ENG	Niyah Dunbar	4	0	0+3	0	0	0	1	0
33	FW	(England) ENG	Ella Parker	1	0	0+1	0	0	0	0	0
37	FW	(Jamaica) JAM	Reanna Blades	6	0	0+5	0	0	0	1	0

=== Goalscorers ===
As of 2 May 2026

Rnk	No	Pos	Nat	Name	WSL2	FA Cup	League Cup	Total
1	8	FW	(England)	Emily Scarr	6	0	1	7
2	10	MF	(New Zealand)	Katie Kitching	6	0	0	6
2	7	FW	(England)	Katy Watson	4	2	0	6
4	9	FW	(England)	Eleanor Dale	4	0	0	4
5	19	FW	(England)	Keira Barry	1	2	0	3
6	2	DF	(Republic of Ireland)	Izzy Atkinson	2	0	0	2
7	3	DF	(England)	Mary Corbyn	1	0	0	1
7	4	DF	(England)	Hannah Greenwood	0	1	0	1
7	5	DF	(Wales)	Rhiannon Roberts	1	0	0	1
7	11	DF	(England)	Jessica Brown	1	0	0	1
7	21	MF	(Republic of Ireland)	Marissa Sheva	1	0	0	1
7	26	MF	(Wales)	Mared Griffiths	1	0	0	1
Total					27	5	1	33

=== Disciplinary record ===
As of 2 May 2026

No.	Pos.	Nat.	Player	WSL2			FA Cup			League Cup			Total		
No.	Pos.	Nat.	Player	Booked	(yellow card) (yellow-red card)	Sent off (straight red)	Booked	(yellow card) (yellow-red card)	Sent off (straight red)	Booked	(yellow card) (yellow-red card)	Sent off (straight red)	Booked	(yellow card) (yellow-red card)	Sent off (straight red)
1	GK	(England)	Demi Lambourne	2	0	0	0	0	0	0	0	0	2	0	0
2	DF	(Republic of Ireland)	Izzy Atkinson	0	0	0	1	0	0	0	0	0	1	0	0
3	DF	(England)	Mary Corbyn	2	0	0	0	0	0	0	0	0	2	0	0
4	DF	(England)	Hannah Greenwood	2	0	0	0	0	0	0	0	0	2	0	0
5	DF	(Wales)	Rhiannon Roberts	3	0	0	0	0	0	0	0	0	3	0	0
6	DF	(England)	Louise Griffiths	0	1	0	0	0	0	0	0	0	0	1	0
7	FW	(England)	Katy Watson	1	0	0	0	0	0	0	0	0	1	0	0
8	FW	(England)	Emily Scarr	3	0	0	0	0	0	0	0	0	3	0	0
9	FW	(England)	Eleanor Dale	2	0	0	0	0	0	0	0	0	2	0	0
10	MF	(New Zealand)	Katie Kitching	1	0	0	0	0	0	1	0	0	1	0	0
11	DF	(England)	Jessica Brown	0	0	0	1	0	0	0	0	0	1	0	0
14	MF	(England)	Natasha Fenton	4	0	0	1	0	0	1	0	0	6	0	0
17	MF	(Republic of Ireland)	Jamie Finn	2	0	0	0	0	0	0	0	0	2	0	0
19	FW	(England)	Keira Barry	0	0	0	0	0	0	1	0	0	1	0	0
20	FW	(England)	Ellen Jones	0	0	0	1	0	0	0	0	0	1	0	0
21	MF	(Republic of Ireland)	Marissa Sheva	5	0	0	0	0	0	0	0	0	5	0	0
26	MF	(Wales)	Mared Griffiths	3	0	0	0	0	0	0	0	0	3	0	0
27	DF	(Scotland)	Brianna Westrup	2	0	0	0	0	0	0	0	0	2	0	0
Total				31	1	0	4	0	0	2	0	0	37	1	0
