= 2026–27 WSL Players Cup =

Tournament details
- Country: England
- Dates: 23 September 2026–March 2027
- Teams: 23

Tournament statistics
- Matches played: 60
- Goals scored: 208 (3.47 per match)
- Attendance: 42,197 (703 per match)
- Top goal scorer(s): (Wales) Mared Griffiths (Manchester United) (7 goals)
- All statistics correct as of 22 November 2026.

The 2026–27 WSL Players Cup is the 16th edition of the Women's Super League and Women's Super League 2's league cup competition. It is sponsored by Subway, and is officially known as the Subway Players Cup for sponsorship reasons. Prior to this edition of the competition, Subway renewed their partnership with WSL Football. 23 teams from across the WSL and WSL 2 compete in the competition.

The 2026–27 edition marks the first following the tournament's restructure and rebrand. The new title—the "Players Cup"—was chosen "to recognise that the new format has been built around player welfare principles." A Swiss-style league format sees the 23 teams participate in two stages, the League Phase and Knockout Phase. Within the League Phase, teams are split into two regionalised sections.

Additionally, the teams competing in the UEFA Women's Champions League (Manchester City, Arsenal and Chelsea) are not participating in the Players Cup due to their increased schedule load and to maximise playing opportunities for squads without continental competition. As such, current League Cup title holders Chelsea are unable to defend their title, and the 'quadruple' no longer remained possible for the season.

League Phase fixtures were announced on 6 August 2026.

== Teams ==
WSL		WSL 2	
Northern Region	Southern Region	Northern Region	Southern Region
Aston Villa; Birmingham City; Everton; Liverpool; Manchester United	Brighton & Hove Albion; Charlton Athletic; Crystal Palace; London City Lionesses; Tottenham Hotspur; West Ham United	Burnley; Durham; Newcastle United; Nottingham Forest; Sheffield United; Sunderland	Bristol City; Ipswich Town; Leicester City; Southampton; Watford; Wolverhampton Wanderers

== Format ==
Following the competition's restructure, the format consists of two stages: the League Phase and the Knockout Phase.

=== League Phase (September–December 2026) ===
League Phase games are split into two regionalised groups (Northern and Southern), with all teams ranked in a combined league table. Title holders Chelsea, WSL champions Manchester City, and WSL runners-up Arsenal are not competing due to their participation in the UEFA Women's Champions League. League Phase games will be played between September and December 2026 on Champions League matchdays.

Each team will play six matches within their region, three home and three away fixtures. Most teams will face three WSL and three WSL 2 opponents, however three Northern WSL teams (Aston Villa, Everton and Manchester United) will play two WSL and four WSL 2 opponents.

Teams are ranked by points (3 points for a win, 0 points for a loss). If a match is level after 90 minutes, it will be decided by a penalty shootout. The shootout winner will receive two points, while the other team will be awarded one point. The top eight teams in the combined league table will advance to the Knockout Phase.

=== Knockout Phase (January–March 2027) ===
Following the League Phase, the top eight teams will be drawn into seeded quarter-finals, with the highest-ranked team facing the eighth-ranked, and so on. The higher-ranked team in each tie will have home advantage. The winners will progress to the semi-finals, where the higher-ranked team will again have the home advantage.

The final will be played at a yet-to-be-confirmed, neutral venue on the weekend of 13 and 14 March 2027.

== League Phase ==
Pos	Grp	Team	Pld	W	PW	PL	L	GF	GA	GD	Pts	Qualification
1	NR	Manchester United	5	5	0	0	0	25	6	+19	15	Advance to Knockout Phase
2	SR	Brighton & Hove Albion	5	4	0	0	1	14	2	+12	12	Advance to Knockout Phase
3	NR	Everton	5	4	0	0	1	13	3	+10	12	Advance to Knockout Phase
4	NR	Liverpool	5	4	0	0	1	19	12	+7	12	Advance to Knockout Phase
5	SR	London City Lionesses	5	4	0	0	1	9	4	+5	12	Advance to Knockout Phase
6	SR	Tottenham Hotspur	5	3	0	2	0	15	2	+13	11	Advance to Knockout Phase
7	SR	West Ham United	5	3	1	0	1	9	4	+5	11	Advance to Knockout Phase
8	NR	Aston Villa	5	3	1	0	1	9	6	+3	11	Advance to Knockout Phase
9	NR	Sunderland	5	3	0	0	2	6	7	−1	9	
10	SR	Crystal Palace	5	2	1	0	2	9	8	+1	8	
11	SR	Wolverhampton Wanderers	5	2	1	0	2	6	13	−7	8	
12	NR	Birmingham City	5	2	0	1	2	12	8	+4	7	
13	SR	Ipswich Town	5	2	0	1	2	7	5	+2	7	
14	NR	Nottingham Forest	5	2	0	1	2	7	6	+1	7	
15	SR	Charlton Athletic	5	2	0	0	3	4	9	−5	6	
16	SR	Southampton	5	1	0	2	2	6	8	−2	5	
17	SR	Bristol City	5	1	1	0	3	7	13	−6	5	
18	NR	Sheffield United	5	1	1	0	3	7	14	−7	5	
19	NR	Newcastle United	5	1	0	0	4	6	9	−3	3	
20	NR	Burnley	5	1	0	0	4	3	12	−9	3	
21	SR	Leicester City	5	0	1	1	3	4	14	−10	3	
22	SR	Watford	5	0	1	0	4	6	14	−8	2	
23	NR	Durham	6	0	0	0	6	5	29	−24	0	

Updated to match(es) played on 22 November 2026. Source: WSL Football
Rules for classification: 1) Points; 2) Goal difference; 3) Number of goals scored; 4) Number of wins; 5) Head-to-head record

=== Northern Region ===
23 September 2026	Everton	2–0	Birmingham City	Walton
19:00 BST	Kramžar 17'; Momiki 55'	Report		Stadium: Goodison Park; Attendance: 1,096; Referee: Adewunmi Soneye

23 September 2026	Liverpool	4–2	Sunderland	Liverpool
19:00 BST	Shaw 23'; Höbinger 47', 56'; Ramos 55'	Report	Paxton 44'; Parker 45+2'	Stadium: BrewDog Stadium; Attendance: 1,717; Referee: Aimee Keir

23 September 2026	Manchester United	10–1	Sheffield United	Leigh
19:00 BST	Le Tissier 14' (pen.); Bernal 19', 55'; Griffiths 22', 60', 81'; Schüller 34', 53'; Toone 42'; Simpson 58'	Report	Andrews 73'	Stadium: Progress With Unity Stadium; Attendance: 1,615; Referee: Megan Wilson

23 September 2026	Nottingham Forest	0–2	Aston Villa	West Bridgford
19:00 BST		Report	Hijikata 66'; Grant 83'	Stadium: City Ground; Attendance: 728; Referee: Callum Parke

30 September 2026	Birmingham City	3–4	Liverpool	Bordesley
19:00 BST	Levasseur 34'; Lee Geum-min 50'; Leidhammer 76'	Report	Höbinger 4', 54'; McDonald 51'; Ramos 90+3'	Stadium: St Andrew's; Attendance: 610; Referee: Julia Kings

30 September 2026	Durham	1–5	Manchester United	South Shields
19:00 BST	Watson 19'	Report	Bernal 11'; Janssen 58'; Jusu Bah 68'; Griffiths 87'; Terland 90+1'	Stadium: Mariners Park; Attendance: 1,944; Referee: Amy Fearn

30 September 2026	Aston Villa	3–1	Newcastle United	Hednesford
19:30 BST	Murphy 10'; Kendall 83', 90+2'	Report	Sevenius 26'	Stadium: Keys Park; Attendance: 535; Referee: Joanne Horwood

18 October 2026	Sheffield United	0–0 (4–2 p)	Nottingham Forest	Scunthorpe
13:00 BST		Report		Stadium: Glanford Park; Attendance: 480; Referee: Fabio Roque
	Penalties
	Andrews (penalty scored); Houssein (penalty scored); Quinn (penalty scored); Rouse (penalty missed); Pearse (penalty scored)		(penalty scored) McKenna; (penalty missed) Shooter; (penalty missed) Boye-Hlorkah; (penalty scored) Lafayette

18 October 2026	Burnley	3–2	Durham	Burnley
14:00 BST	Finn 35'; Siddall 43'; Paul 90+4'	Report	Wilson 75'; Addison 81'	Stadium: Turf Moor; Attendance: 236; Referee: Ella Broad

18 October 2026	Newcastle United	0–1	Sunderland	Gateshead
14:00 BST		Report	Kitching 49'	Stadium: Gateshead International Stadium; Attendance: 2,773; Referee: Melissa Burgin

21 October 2026	Burnley	0–2	Aston Villa	Burnley
19:00 BST		Report	Mullett 5'; Murphy 56'	Stadium: Turf Moor; Attendance: 261; Referee: Amy Fearn

21 October 2026	Durham	0–5	Birmingham City	South Shields
19:00 BST	Collinson (yellow card) 58'	Report	Sarri 29', 90'; Leidhammar 34'; Cornet 78'; Crosthwaite 80'	Stadium: Mariners Park; Attendance: 630; Referee: Adewunmi Soneye

21 October 2026	Everton	2–0	Newcastle United	Walton
19:00 BST	Vignola 81', 84'	Report		Stadium: Goodison Park; Attendance: 1,138; Referee: Grace Lowe

21 October 2026	Liverpool	3–5	Manchester United	Liverpool
19:00 BST	Kapocs 76', 85', 88'	Report	Schüller 11'; Griffiths 41', 44'; Jusu Bah 72'; Le Tissier 78'	Stadium: BrewDog Stadium; Attendance: 2,388; Referee: Abigail Byrne

28 October 2026	Manchester United	3–0	Burnley	Leigh
19:00 GMT	Wangerheim 29'; Schüller 66', 85'	Report		Stadium: Progress With Unity Stadium; Attendance: 1,875; Referee: Alice Parker

28 October 2026	Sheffield United	1–2	Everton	Scunthorpe
19:00 GMT	Willis 90+1'	Report	van Gool 8'; Mouchon 14'	Stadium: Attis Arena; Attendance: 502; Referee: Aimee Keir

28 October 2026	Aston Villa	1–1 (6–5 p)	Birmingham City	Hednesford
19:30 GMT	Harviken 69'	Report	Harris 90+4'	Stadium: Keys Park; Attendance: 1,548; Referee: Melissa Burgin
	Penalties
	Jean-François (penalty scored); Deslandes (penalty scored); Maltby (penalty missed); Kendall (penalty scored); Harviken (penalty scored); Taylor (penalty scored); Grant (penalty scored)		(penalty scored) Hurtré; (penalty scored) Lee; (penalty missed) Sarri; (penalty scored) Cooke; (penalty scored) Harris; (penalty scored) Herron; (penalty missed) Miyagawa

1 November 2026	Durham	1–5	Newcastle United	South Shields
12:00 GMT	Watson 13'	Report	Thomas 26', 52'; Lumsden 38', 57'; Pennock 78' (o.g.)	Stadium: Mariners Park; Attendance: 1,038; Referee: Julia Kings

1 November 2026	Nottingham Forest	4–0	Burnley	West Bridgford
14:00 GMT	Murphy 40'; Lafayette 67'; Johnson 88'; Shooter 90'	Report		Stadium: City Ground; Attendance: 790; Referee: Laura van Lier

1 November 2026	Sunderland	1–0	Sheffield United	Hetton-le-Hole
14:00 GMT	Paxton 65'	Report		Stadium: Eppleton CW; Attendance: 330; Referee: Hannah Gardner

11 November 2026	Birmingham City	3–1	Sunderland	Bordesley
19:00 GMT	Crosthwaite 40'; Holloway 69'; Leidhammar 82'	Report	Parker 44'	Stadium: St Andrew's; Attendance: 281; Referee: Aimee Keir

11 November 2026	Everton	6–0	Durham	Walton
19:00 GMT	Rantala 20'; Momiki 51', 71', 88'; Mouchon 64', 85'	Report		Stadium: Goodison Park; Attendance: 1,005; Referee: Megan Wilson

11 November 2026	Liverpool	4–1	Aston Villa	Liverpool
19:00 GMT	Höbinger 30'; Kapocs 78'; Olsson 85', 89'	Report	Kearns 6'	Stadium: BrewDog Stadium; Attendance: 1,685; Referee: Phoebe Cross

18 November 2026	Manchester United	2–1	Everton	Leigh
19:00 GMT	Griffiths 36'; Watson 45+1'	Report	Mouchon 47'	Stadium: Progress With Unity Stadium; Attendance: 1,489; Referee: Phoebe Cross

18 November 2026	Nottingham Forest	1–4	Liverpool	West Bridgford
19:00 GMT	Rose 84'	Report	Enderby 20', 69'; Olsson 40'; Ferguson 44' (o.g.)	Stadium: City Ground; Attendance: 1,002; Referee: Megan Wilson

22 November 2026	Newcastle United	0–2	Nottingham Forest	Gateshead
14:00 GMT		Report	Rose 31'; Espås 35'	Stadium: Gateshead International Stadium

22 November 2026	Sheffield United	5–1	Durham
14:00 GMT	Rouse 11'; Scofield 36'; Andrews 66'; Baker 90+1', 90+3'	Report	{[Lucy Watson (footballer)

22 November 2026	Sunderland	1–0	Burnley	Hetton-le-Hole
14:00 GMT	Kitching 72'	Report		Stadium: Eppleton CW

16 December 2026	Aston Villa	v	Sheffield United	Hednesford
19:00 GMT		Report		Stadium: Keys Park

16 December 2026	Birmingham City	v	Nottingham Forest	Bordesley
19:00 GMT		Report		Stadium: St Andrew's

16 December 2026	Burnley	v	Liverpool	Burnley
19:00 GMT		Report		Stadium: Turf Moor

16 December 2026	Newcastle United	v	Manchester United	Gateshead
19:00 GMT		Report		Stadium: Gateshead International Stadium

16 December 2026	Sunderland	v	Everton	Hetton-le-Hole
19:00 GMT		Report		Stadium: Eppleton CW

=== Southern Region ===
23 September 2026	Crystal Palace	1–0	Watford	Sutton
19:00 BST	S. O'Brien 82'	Report		Stadium: VBS Community Stadium; Attendance: 356; Referee: Ryan Atkin

23 September 2026	Tottenham Hotspur	0–0 (3–4 p)	West Ham United	Leyton
19:00 BST		Report		Stadium: BetWright Stadium; Attendance: 746; Referee: Amy Fearn
	Penalties
	Spence (penalty scored); Dijkstra (penalty missed); Gaupset (penalty scored); Pelova (penalty scored); Martinez (penalty missed)		(penalty scored) Zelem; (penalty scored) Nyström; (penalty scored) Gago; (penalty scored) Codina; (penalty missed) Salmon

23 September 2026	Leicester City	0–2	London City Lionesses	Nottingham
19:30 BST		Report	Parris 80'; Diani 88'	Stadium: Meadow Lane; Attendance: 473; Referee: Ben Speedie

23 September 2026	Brighton & Hove Albion	4–0	Charlton Athletic	Crawley
19:45 BST	Tvedten 14', 55'; Hayes 65'; Peskett 82'	Report		Stadium: Broadfield Stadium; Attendance: 505; Referee: Oliver Mackey

30 September 2026	Crystal Palace	3–0	Charlton Athletic	Sutton
19:00 BST	Hopcroft 22'; Howart 62'; Lloyd-Smith 90+3'	Report		Stadium: VBS Community Stadium; Attendance: 264; Referee: Lisa Benn

30 September 2026	West Ham United	3–1	Southampton	Dagenham
19:00 BST	Siren 54', 79'; Wandeler 65'	Report	Brazil 2'	Stadium: Chigwell Construction Stadium; Attendance: 268; Referee: Aimee Keir

30 September 2026	Ipswich Town	0–1	London City Lionesses	Myland
19:30 BST		Report	van de Donk 90'	Stadium: JobServe Community Stadium; Attendance: 1,283; Referee: Ryan Atkin

30 September 2026	Brighton & Hove Albion	0–1	Tottenham Hotspur	Crawley
19:45 BST		Report	Holdt 36'	Stadium: Broadfield Stadium; Attendance: 628; Referee: Stacey Pearson

17 October 2026	Watford	2–2 (3–0 p)	Leicester City	Edgware
15:00 BST	Wilson 54'; Poole 90+1'	Report	Dennis 14'; Stapleton 64'	Stadium: The Hive Stadium; Attendance: 312; Referee: Alice Parker
	Penalties
	Perry (penalty scored); Poole (penalty scored); Filbey (penalty scored)		(penalty missed) Goodwin; (penalty missed) Pritchard; (penalty missed) Lehmann

18 October 2026	Wolverhampton Wanderers	2–2 (7–6 p)	Ipswich Town	Wolverhampton
14:00 BST	Lawley 47'; Jenner 78'	Report	Slattery 7'; Peake 34'	Stadium: Molineux Stadium; Attendance: 539; Referee: Jodie Hunter
	Penalties
	Morphet (penalty scored); Olding (penalty missed); Williams (penalty scored); Hughes (penalty scored); Lawley (penalty scored); Sims (penalty scored); Jenner (penalty scored); Marshall (penalty scored)		(penalty scored) Timms; (penalty scored) Ademiluyi; (penalty missed) Cavanagh; (penalty scored) Peake; (penalty scored) Dear; (penalty scored) Lawton; (penalty scored) Fox; (penalty missed) Hornby

18 October 2026	Bristol City	1–1 (4–3 p)	Southampton	Failand
15:00 BST	Robinson 59'	Report	Harries 34'	Stadium: Robins High Performance Centre; Attendance: 397; Referee: Julia Kings
	Penalties
	Syme (penalty scored); Bissell (penalty scored); Williams (penalty scored); Lindström (penalty missed); Dafeur (penalty scored); Farrugia (penalty scored)		(penalty scored) Brown; (penalty missed) Collett; (penalty missed) Cavanagh; (penalty scored) Goddard; (penalty scored) Mott; (penalty missed) Bashford

21 October 2026	Southampton	3–2	Crystal Palace	Eastleigh
19:00 BST	Jupp 17'; Brazil 39'; Collett 45+2'	Report	Blanchard 9', 18' (pen.)	Stadium: Silverlake Stadium; Attendance: 254; Referee: Sophie Dennington

21 October 2026	West Ham United	1–2	London City Lionesses	Dagenham
19:00 BST	Asseyi 38'	Report	Anyomi 29'; Goodwin 45+3'	Stadium: Chigwell Construction Stadium; Attendance: 567; Referee: Kirsty Dowle

21 October 2026	Charlton Athletic	2–0	Bristol City	Charlton
19:30 BST	Van Egmond 75'; Waldie 80'	Report		Stadium: The Valley; Attendance: 306; Referee: Lisa Benn

28 October 2026	Bristol City	1–6	Tottenham Hotspur	Failand
19:00 GMT	Hardy 43'	Report	Martinez 14', 24', 78'; Holdt 20'; Gaupset 41'; M. Nildén 49'	Stadium: Robins High Performance Centre; Attendance: 496; Referee: Ross Martin

28 October 2026	London City Lionesses	4–2	Crystal Palace	Bromley
19:00 GMT	Goodwin 44', 59', 74'; Godfrey 84'	Report	Blanchard 82'; O'Brien 90+2'	Stadium: Copperjax Community Stadium; Attendance: 1,284; Referee: Abigail Byrne

28 October 2026	Charlton Athletic	1–2	West Ham United	Charlton
19:30 GMT	Johnston 69'	Report	Morgan 39', 42'	Stadium: The Valley; Attendance: 420; Referee: Amy Fearn

28 October 2026	Wolverhampton Wanderers	0–6	Brighton & Hove Albion	Wellington
19:30 GMT		Report	Hayes 4'; Tvedten 45+1'; Joramo 47'; Warren 49'; Murphy 66' (pen.); Mpomé 88'	Stadium: SEAH Stadium; Attendance: 695; Referee: Lisa Benn

31 October 2026	Watford	1–4	Ipswich Town	Edgware
15:00 GMT	Noonan 14'	Report	Slattery 9'; Dear 55'; Ademiluyi 74'; Timms 90+2'	Stadium: The Hive Stadium; Attendance: 257; Referee: Fabio Roque

1 November 2026	Southampton	1–1 (3–4 p)	Leicester City	Eastleigh
14:00 GMT	McInnes 68'	Report	Nyström 87'	Stadium: Silverlake Stadium; Attendance: 440; Referee: Callum Parke
	Penalties
	Edwards (penalty scored); Goddard (penalty missed); Mott (penalty scored); Murphy (penalty missed); Brown (penalty scored)		(penalty scored) Nyström; (penalty scored) Mayling; (penalty scored) Stapleton; (penalty missed) Bance; (penalty scored) Payne

1 November 2026	Wolverhampton Wanderers	2–1	Bristol City	Wellington
14:00 GMT	Daniëls 46'; Filis 81'	Report	Syme 64'	Stadium: SEAH Stadium; Attendance: 536; Referee: Joanne Horwood

11 November 2026	Tottenham Hotspur	1–1 (3–5 p)	Crystal Palace	Leyton
19:00 GMT	Blakstad 75'	Report	England 21'	Stadium: BetWright Stadium; Attendance: 531; Referee: Lisa Benn
	Penalties
	Gaupset (penalty scored); Tandberg (penalty missed); Spence (penalty scored); Blakstad (penalty scored)		(penalty scored) Blanchard; (penalty scored) Bartrip; (penalty scored) Tsunoda; (penalty scored) Larkin; (penalty scored) Enge

11 November 2026	Charlton Athletic	1–0	Ipswich Town	Charlton
19:30 GMT	Azarro 79'	Report		Stadium: The Valley; Attendance: 392; Referee: Ella Broad

11 November 2026	Brighton & Hove Albion	3–1	Watford	Crawley
19:45 GMT	Murphy 58', 84'; Garcia 69'	Report	Teisar 27'	Stadium: Broadfield Stadium; Attendance: 539; Referee: Ryan Atkin

18 November 2026	London City Lionesses	0–1	Brighton & Hove Albion	Bromley
19:00 GMT		Report	Murphy 67'	Stadium: Copperjax Community Stadium; Attendance: 1,048; Referee: Sophie Dennington

18 November 2026	Tottenham Hotspur	7–0	Leicester City	Leyton
19:00 GMT	Holdt 5', 19'; Gunning-Williams 11', 15'; Gaupset 49'; Blakstad 58'; Martinez 88'	Report		Stadium: BetWright Stadium; Attendance: 526; Referee: Alice Parker

18 November 2026	West Ham United	3–0	Wolverhampton Wanderers	Dagenham
19:00 GMT	Öztaş 49'; Gago 77'; Tennebø 88'	Report		Stadium: Chigwell Construction Stadium; Attendance: 439; Referee: Amy Fearn

22 November 2026	Ipswich Town	1–0	Southampton	Myland
14:00 GMT	Graham 36'	Report		Stadium: JobServe Community Stadium

22 November 2026	Bristol City	4–2	Watford	Failand
15:00 GMT	Hardy 17'; Farrugia 36', 65', 73'	Report	Lyon 52'; Teisar 64'	Stadium: Robins High Performance Centre

22 November 2026	Leicester City	1–2	Wolverhampton Wanderers	Nottingham
14:00 GMT	Goodwin 41'	Report	Jones 35'; Greengrass 79'	Stadium: Meadow Lane

16 December 2026	Crystal Palace	v	Wolverhampton Wanderers	Sutton
19:00 GMT		Report		Stadium: VBS Community Stadium

16 December 2026	Ipswich Town	v	Tottenham Hotspur	Myland
19:00 GMT		Report		Stadium: JobServe Community Stadium

16 December 2026	Leicester City	v	Charlton Athletic	Nottingham
19:00 GMT		Report		Stadium: Meadow Lane

16 December 2026	London City Lionesses	v	Bristol City	Bromley
19:00 GMT		Report		Stadium: Copperjax Community Stadium

16 December 2026	Southampton	v	Brighton & Hove Albion	Eastleigh
19:00 GMT		Report		Stadium: Silverlake Stadium

16 December 2026	Watford	v	West Ham United	Edgware
19:00 GMT		Report		Stadium: The Hive Stadium

== Knockout Phase ==
Quarter-finals
QF1: 13/14 January 2027
League 1
League 8
QF3: 13/14 January 2027
League 3
League 6
QF2: 13/14 January 2027
League 2
League 7
QF4: 13/14 January 2027
League 4
League 5

Semi-finals
10/11 February 2027
QF1 winner
QF3 winner
10/11 February 2027
QF2 winner
QF4 winner

Final
13/14 March 2027
SF1 winner
SF2 winner

=== Quarter-finals ===
13/14 January 2027

TBC	v	TBC

13/14 January 2027

TBC	v	TBC

13/14 January 2027

TBC	v	TBC

13/14 January 2027

TBC	v	TBC

=== Semi-finals ===
10/11 February 2027

TBC	v	TBC

10/11 February 2027

TBC	v	TBC

=== Final ===
13/14 March 2027

TBC	v	TBC

== Statistics ==
=== Top goalscorers ===
Correct as of 22 November 2026.

Rank	Player	Club	Goals
1	(Wales) Mared Griffiths	Manchester United	7
2	(Austria) Marie Höbinger	Liverpool	5
2	(Germany) Lea Schüller	Manchester United	5
4	(England) Isobel Goodwin	London City Lionesses	4
4	(Denmark) Olivia Holdt	Tottenham Hotspur	4
4	(Sweden) Cornelia Kapocs	Liverpool	4
4	(Japan) Yuka Momiki	Everton	4
4	(Germany) Shekiera Martinez	Tottenham Hotspur	4
4	(Japan) Yuka Momiki	Everton	4
4	(France) Noémie Mouchon	Everton	4
4	(Republic of Ireland) Emily Murphy	Brighton & Hove Albion	4
11	(Mexico) Rebeca Bernal	Manchester United	3
11	(England) Annabel Blanchard	Crystal Palace	3
11	(Malta) Maria Farrugia	Bristol City	3
11	(Sweden) Wilma Leidhammar	Birmingham City	3
11	(Sweden) Beata Olsson	Liverpool	3
11	(Norway) Olaug Tvedten	Brighton & Hove Albion	3
11	(England) Lucy Watson	Durham	3

==== Hat-tricks ====
Player	For	Against	Result	Date
(Wales) Mared Griffiths	Manchester United	Sheffield United	10–1 (H)	23 September 2026
(Sweden) Cornelia Kapocs	Liverpool	Manchester United	3–5 (H)	21 October 2026
(Germany) Shekiera Martinez	Tottenham Hotspur	Bristol City	1–6 (A)	28 October 2026
(England) Isobel Goodwin	London City Lionesses	Crystal Palace	4–2 (H)	28 October 2026
(Japan) Yuka Momiki	Everton	Durham	6–0 (H)	11 November 2026
(Malta) Maria Farrugia	Bristol City	Watford	4–2 (H)	22 November 2026

=== Clean sheets ===
Rank	Player	Club	Clean sheets
1	(Canada) Rylee Foster-Inman	Everton	3
1	(Germany) Melina Loeck	Brighton & Hove Albion	3
1	(Norway) Selma Panengstuen	Tottenham Hotspur	3
1	(United States) Noa Schumacher	Sunderland	3
5	(England) Emily Batty	Nottingham Forest	2
5	(England) Mary Earps	London City Lionesses	2
5	(Finland) Anna Koivunen	Charlton Athletic	2
5	(Republic of Ireland) Megan Walsh	West Ham United	2
5	(United States) Shae Yañez	Crystal Palace	2
10	7 players		1

== See also ==
- 2026–27 Women's Super League
- 2026–27 Women's Super League 2
- 2026–27 Women's FA Cup
