= 2026–27 Manchester United W.F.C. season =

Manchester United Women
2026–27 season
- Co-chairmen: Joel and Avram Glazer
- Head coach: Eva Olid
- Stadium: Leigh Sports Village; Old Trafford (selected matches)
- Women's Super League: 4th
- FA Cup: Fourth round
- League Cup: League phase
- Top goalscorer: League: Elisabeth Terland; Julia Zigiotti (4 each); All: Mared Griffiths (7)
Home colours	Away colours	Third colours
- All statistics correct as of 22 November 2026.

The 2026–27 season will be Manchester United Women's ninth season since they were founded and their eighth in the Women's Super League, the professional top-flight women's league in England. The club will be competing in the FA Cup and the League Cup.

Marc Skinner left his position as head coach by mutual agreement on 3 August 2026, ending a spell of 5 years in charge. Eva Olid was announced as his successor two days later on 5 August.

== Pre-season and friendlies ==
Manchester United's pre-season fixtures were announced on 6 August 2026.

Date	Opponents	H / A	Result F–A	Scorers	Attendance
8 August 2026	Leicester City	A	1–1	Terland 77'	0 (Note: Match played behind closed doors)
19 August 2026	Newcastle United	N	0–1		0
23 August 2026	Liverpool	H	1–2	Toone 50'	0
29 August 2026	Manchester City	A	0–2		0

== Overview ==
Competition	First match	Last match	Starting round	Final position	Record							
Competition	First match	Last match	Starting round	Final position	Pld	W	D	L	GF	GA	GD	Win %
Women's Super League	4 September 2026	22/23 May 2027	Matchday 1	TBD	11	6	3	2	14	12	+2	54.55
Women's FA Cup	17 January 2027		Round 4	TBD	0	0	0	0	0	0	+0	—
WSL Players Cup	23 September 2026		League Phase	TBD	5	5	0	0	25	6	+19	100.00
Total					16	11	3	2	39	18	+21	68.75

Last updated: 22 November 2026
Source: Competitions

== Women's Super League ==
The 2026–27 Women's Super League fixtures were announced on 30 July 2026.

Date	Opponents	H / A	Result F–A	Scorers	Attendance	League position
4 September 2026	London City Lionesses	A	1–2	Awujo 90+10'	5,402	9th
13 September 2026	Chelsea	H	0–5		4,327	14th
19 September 2026	Arsenal	A	1–1	Zigiotti 67'	29,853	13th
27 September 2026	West Ham United	H	2–1	Terland 9', Medina 72'	2,959	9th
3 October 2026	Liverpool	H	1–0	Zigiotti 6'	3,416	7th
18 October 2026	Charlton Athletic	A	3–1	Toone 6', Medina 10', Zigiotti 31'	2,340	5th
25 October 2026	Manchester City	H	1–1	Terland 89'	5,361	4th
31 October 2026	Everton	A	0–0		2,547	5th
8 November 2026	Aston Villa	A	1–0	Zigiotti 72'	2,682	5th
14 November 2026	Crystal Palace	H	2–0	Le Tissier 18', Terland 65'	2,689	4th
22 November 2026	Birmingham City	A	2–1	Terland 80', Awujo 90+4'		4th
13 December 2026	Brighton & Hove Albion	H				
20 December 2026	Tottenham Hotspur	H				
10 January 2027	Crystal Palace	A				
20 January 2027	West Ham United	A				
24 January 2027	Everton	H				
31 January 2027	London City Lionesses	H				
7 February 2027	Tottenham Hotspur	A				
14 February 2027	Manchester City	A				
14 March 2027	Charlton Athletic	H				
17 March 2027	Liverpool	A				
28 March 2027	Aston Villa	H				
4 April 2027	Chelsea	A				
2 May 2027	Birmingham City	H				
9 May 2027	Arsenal	H				
22/23 May 2027	Brighton & Hove Albion	A				

=== Table ===
Pos	Team	Pld	W	D	L	GF	GA	GD	Pts	Qualification or relegation
2	Manchester City	11	8	1	2	28	14	+14	25	Qualification for the Champions League league phase
3	London City Lionesses	11	7	2	2	31	14	+17	23	Qualification for the Champions League third qualifying round
4	Manchester United	11	6	3	2	14	12	+2	21	
5	Tottenham Hotspur	11	6	2	3	28	19	+9	20	
6	Arsenal	11	3	6	2	11	11	0	15	

Updated to match(es) played on 22 November 2026. Source: Women's Super League Table
Rules for classification: 1) Points; 2) Goal difference; 3) Number of goals scored.

== Women's FA Cup ==
As a member of the first tier, United will be entering the FA Cup in the fourth round proper.

== Women's League Cup ==
=== League phase ===
As a team not qualified for the group stage of the Champions League, Manchester United will enter the League Cup at the league phase, split regionally. The competition has a new format; United will play six games, three at home and three away, against six different teams from the northern section. The league phase fixtures were released on 6 August 2026.

Date	Opponents	H / A	Result F–A	Scorers	Attendance	League position
23 September 2026	Sheffield United	H	10–1	Le Tissier 15' (pen.), Bernal (2) 20', 55', Griffiths (3) 23', 60', 81', Schüller (2) 35', 53', Toone 43', Simpson 58'	1,615	1st
30 September 2026	Durham	A	5–1	Bernal 11', Janssen 58', Jusu Bah 68', Griffiths 87', Terland 90+1'	1,944	1st
21 October 2026	Liverpool	A	5–3	Schüller 11', Griffiths (2) 41', 44', Jusu Bah 72', Le Tissier 78'	2,388	1st
28 October 2026	Burnley	H	3–0	Wangerheim 29', Schüller (2) 66', 85'	1,875	1st
18 November 2026	Everton	H	2–1	Griffiths 36', Watson 45+1'	1,489	1st
16 December 2026	Newcastle United	A				

=== Table ===
Pos	Grp	Team	Pld	W	PW	PL	L	GF	GA	GD	Pts	Qualification
1	NR	Manchester United	5	5	0	0	0	25	6	+19	15	Advance to Knockout Phase
2	SR	Brighton & Hove Albion	5	4	0	0	1	14	2	+12	12	Advance to Knockout Phase
3	NR	Everton	5	4	0	0	1	13	3	+10	12	Advance to Knockout Phase
4	NR	Liverpool	5	4	0	0	1	19	12	+7	12	Advance to Knockout Phase
5	SR	London City Lionesses	5	4	0	0	1	9	4	+5	12	Advance to Knockout Phase

Updated to match(es) played on 22 November 2026. Source: WSL Football
Rules for classification: 1) Points; 2) Goal difference; 3) Number of goals scored; 4) Number of wins; 5) Head-to-head record

== Squad statistics ==
As of 22 November 2026
Numbers in brackets denote appearances as substitute.
Key to positions: GK – Goalkeeper; DF – Defender; MF – Midfielder; FW – Forward

No.	Pos.	Name	League		FA Cup		League Cup		Total		Discipline	
No.	Pos.	Name	Apps	Goals	Apps	Goals	Apps	Goals	Apps	Goals	Yellow card	Red card
1	GK	(England) Kayla Rendell	0	0	0	0	0	0	0	0	0	0
2	DF	(Sweden) Anna Sandberg	8(2)	0	0	0	1	0	9(2)	0	2	0
4	DF	(England) Maya Le Tissier (c)	11	1	0	0	5	2	16	3	2	0
5	DF	(Sweden) Hanna Lundkvist	10(1)	0	0	0	3	0	13(1)	0	0	0
6	DF	(Spain) Andrea Medina	9(1)	2	0	0	1(1)	0	10(2)	2	4	0
7	MF	(England) Ella Toone	8(2)	1	0	0	2(1)	1	10(3)	2	0	0
8	MF	(England) Jess Park	11	0	0	0	0(2)	0	11(2)	0	0	0
10	FW	(Norway) Elisabeth Terland	11	4	0	0	0(2)	1	11(2)	5	0	0
11	FW	(Norway) Celin Bizet Dønnum	1(1)	0	0	0	0(2)	0	1(3)	0	0	0
12	FW	(Sweden) Fridolina Rolfö	0	0	0	0	0	0	0	0	0	0
13	MF	(Canada) Simi Awujo	4(7)	2	0	0	4(1)	0	8(8)	2	2	0
14	DF	(Canada) Jayde Riviere	4(1)	0	0	0	0(1)	0	4(2)	0	0	0
15	MF	(Sweden) Julia Zigiotti	10(1)	4	0	0	1(1)	0	11(2)	4	4	0
16	MF	(Mexico) Rebeca Bernal	0(5)	0	0	0	5	3	5(5)	3	1	0
17	DF	(Netherlands) Dominique Janssen	11	0	0	0	4(1)	1	15(1)	1	0	0
19	FW	(Sweden) Ellen Wangerheim	0	0	0	0	2(3)	1	2(3)	1	0	0
20	MF	(Japan) Hinata Miyazawa	11	0	0	0	0(2)	0	11(2)	0	0	0
21	MF	(Scotland) Emma Watson	0	0	0	0	1(1)	1	1(1)	1	0	0
22	DF	(Wales) Scarlett Hill	0	0	0	0	2(2)	0	2(2)	0	1	0
23	FW	(Sweden) Monica Jusu Bah	1(5)	0	0	0	5	2	6(5)	2	0	0
24	FW	(Germany) Lea Schüller	0(10)	0	0	0	5	5	5(10)	5	1	0
25	GK	(Germany) Janina Leitzig	0	0	0	0	5	0	5	0	0	0
26	DF	(England) Jess Simpson	0	0	0	0	4(1)	1	4(1)	1	1	0
27	FW	(England) Layla Drury	0(1)	0	0	0	0(1)	0	0(2)	0	0	0
36	MF	(Wales) Mared Griffiths	0(3)	0	0	0	5	7	5(3)	7	1	0
39	GK	(Wales) Safia Middleton-Patel	0	0	0	0	0	0	0	0	0	0
44	GK	(England) Evie Mitchell	0	0	0	0	0	0	0	0	0	0
47	MF	(England) Jessica Anderson	0	0	0	0	0(2)	0	0(2)	0	0	0
55	DF	(England) Lucy Newell	0	0	0	0	0(1)	0	0(1)	0	0	0
91	GK	(United States) Phallon Tullis-Joyce	11	0	0	0	0	0	11	0	0	0
Own goals			—	0	—	0	—	0	—	0	—	—

== Transfers ==
=== In ===
Date	Pos.	Name	From	Ref.
1 July 2026	GK	(England) Phoebe Lear	(England) Ferdinand Collective	
1 July 2026	MF	(England) Erin Baxter	(England) Aston Villa	
1 July 2026	DF	(Spain) Andrea Medina	(Spain) Atlético Madrid	
7 July 2026	MF	(England) Hollie Stone-Armstrong	(England) Leicester City	
24 July 2026	GK	(Germany) Janina Leitzig	(England) Leicester City	
28 August 2026	FW	(Sweden) Monica Jusu Bah	(Sweden) BK Häcken	
2 September 2026	MF	(Mexico) Rebeca Bernal	(United States) Washington Spirit	

=== Out ===
Date	Pos.	Name	To	Ref.
30 June 2026	FW	(England) Summer Hadfield	(England) Liverpool	
30 June 2026	FW	(England) Leah Galton	(England) Burnley (Note: Released, joined Burnley on 16 September 2026.)	
30 June 2026	GK	(Wales) Lacey Pourtney	(England) Aston Villa	
30 June 2026	MF	(England) Teiarnie Moore	(England) Leeds United	
30 June 2026	MF	(England) Tamira Livingston	(England) Huddersfield Town	
30 June 2026	DF	(England) Hannah Blundell	(England) Everton (Note: Released, joined Everton on 20 July 2026.)	
7 July 2026	MF	(England) Sienna Wareing	(England) West Ham United	
14 July 2026	MF	(England) Mylee Dunbar	(England) Burnley (Note: Released, joined Burnley on 30 August 2026.)	
15 July 2026	DF	(England) Millie Turner	(England) Birmingham City	
15 July 2026	MF	(Norway) Lisa Naalsund	(England) Birmingham City	
20 July 2026	FW	(France) Melvine Malard	(England) Chelsea	
20 July 2026	GK	(England) Millie Crook	(England) Rugby Borough (Note: Released, joined Rugby Borough on 22 July 2026.)	
6 August 2026	DF	(England) Gabby George	(England) Brighton & Hove Albion	
4 October 2026	GK	(Wales) Poppy Lyons-Walker	(United States) IMG Academy	
28 October 2026	DF	(England) Dixie Thirde	(England) Chorley	

=== Loan out ===
Date from	Date to	Pos.	Name	To	Ref
27 July 2026	30 June 2027	GK	(England) Kayla Rendell	(England) Newcastle United	
18 August 2026	30 June 2027	GK	(Wales) Safia Middleton-Patel	(England) Watford	
20 August 2026	30 June 2027	MF	(England) Olivia Turner	(England) Huddersfield Town	
4 October 2026	30 June 2027	MF	(England) Evie McCaffrey	(England) Stockport County	
