= Mared Griffiths =

Welsh footballer (born 2007)

Personal information
- Full name: Mared Alaw Griffiths
- Date of birth: 3 March 2007 (age 19)
- Place of birth: Trawsfynydd, Wales
- Position: Midfielder

Team information
- Current team: Manchester United
- Number: 36

Youth career
- FAW North Academy
- 2024–: Manchester United

Senior career*
Years	Team	Apps	(Gls)
2025–	Manchester United	3	(0)
2026	→ Sunderland (loan)	8	(1)

International career^{‡}
2022–2024	Wales U17	15	(3)
2023–	Wales U19	6	(1)
2025–	Wales	12	(4)
- * Club domestic league appearances and goals as of 25 October 2026 ‡ National team caps and goals as of 13 October 2026

Mared Alaw Griffiths (Welsh: [ˈmarɛd aˈlaw]; born 3 March 2007) is a Welsh professional footballer who plays as a midfielder for Women's Super League club Manchester United and the Wales national team.

== Early life & career ==
Griffiths attended Coleg Meirion-Dwyfor in Gwynedd, Wales and studied Level 3 Business. Having played for the FAW North Academy, in July 2024, she moved to Manchester United to join the club's under-21 academy team.

== Senior career ==
=== Manchester United ===
On 11 December 2024, Griffiths was named to Manchester United's senior matchday squad for the first time; she was an unused substitute in the team's League Cup group stage match against Newcastle United. Griffiths made her senior debut on 8 February 2025, appearing as an 81st-minute substitute and scoring twice in a 6–0 FA Cup victory over third-division Wolverhampton Wanderers. On 14 July 2025, Griffiths signed her first professional contract with Manchester United.

==== Loan to Sunderland, 2026 ====
On 3 February 2026, Griffiths joined Sunderland on loan for the remainder of the 2025–26 season.

==== Return to Manchester United, 2026– ====
On 23 September 2026, during her first competitive start for United, Griffiths scored a hat-trick in a 10–1 WSL Players Cup win over Sheffield United.

== International career ==
=== Youth ===
On 30 October 2022, Griffiths made her debut for the Wales under-17s in 2023 U17 Championship qualification against Montenegro in a 4–0 victory, playing as a left winger. She scored her debut goal for the youth team in the second round of qualification against Finland during a 2–1 defeat.

In October 2023, she played the full 90 minutes for the under-19s in all three 2024 UEFA Women's Under-19 Championship qualification first round matches against Czech Republic, England, and Greece.

=== Senior ===
In March 2024, Griffiths was called up to the Wales national team for the first time, for UEFA Euro 2025 qualifying games against Croatia and Kosovo; one of five uncapped young players added to the squad by Rhian Wilkinson. A regular with the under-17s, she was recalled to the senior team for qualifying matches in June 2024, and later qualifying play-offs against Slovakia and the Republic of Ireland in October and November 2024. In total, Griffiths was named as a substitute four times during the qualification campaign but did not make her debut.

On 21 February 2025, she made her senior international debut, appearing as a substitute in a 1–0 defeat to Italy in the 2025 UEFA Women's Nations League. Her first international goal arrived on 25 October in a 2–1 loss to Australia. She was awarded Wales' Player of the Match for her composed technique, scoring in only her second appearance for the senior team.

On 7 March 2026, four days after her 19th birthday, Griffiths made her competitive debut and scored a brace for Wales as they beat Montenegro 6–1 in a 2027 FIFA World Cup qualification match.

== Personal life ==
Griffiths is from the village of Trawsfynydd and studies business at Meirion-Dwyfor college in Dolgellau, Gwynedd, Wales.

== Career statistics ==
=== Club ===
As of match played 18 November 2026.

Appearances and goals by club, season and competition
Club	Season	League			FA Cup		League Cup		Total	
Club	Season	Division	Apps	Goals	Apps	Goals	Apps	Goals	Apps	Goals
Manchester United	2024–25	Women's Super League	0	0	1	2	0	0	1	2
Manchester United	2025–26	Women's Super League	0	0	0	0	0	0	0	0
Manchester United	2026–27	Women's Super League	3	0	0	0	5	7	8	7
Manchester United	Total		3	0	1	2	5	7	9	9
Sunderland (loan)	2025–26	Women's Super League 2	8	1	0	0	0	0	8	1
Career total			11	1	1	2	5	7	17	10

=== International ===
As of match played 13 October 2026

Appearances and goals by national team and year
National team	Year	Apps	Goals
Wales	2025	4	1
Wales	2026	8	3
Total		12	4

List of international goals scored by Mared Griffiths
No.	Date	Venue	Opponent	Score	Result	Competition
1.	25 October 2025	Cardiff City Stadium, Cardiff, Wales	Australia	1–1	1–2	Friendly
2.	7 March 2026	Parc y Scarlets, Llanelli, Wales	Montenegro	3–0	6–1	2027 FIFA Women's World Cup qualification
3.	7 March 2026	Parc y Scarlets, Llanelli, Wales	Montenegro	6–1	6–1	2027 FIFA Women's World Cup qualification
4.	9 June 2026	Cardiff City Stadium, Cardiff, Wales	Czech Republic	3–1	3–1	2027 FIFA Women's World Cup qualification
