= Natasha Fenton =

English footballer (born 1998)

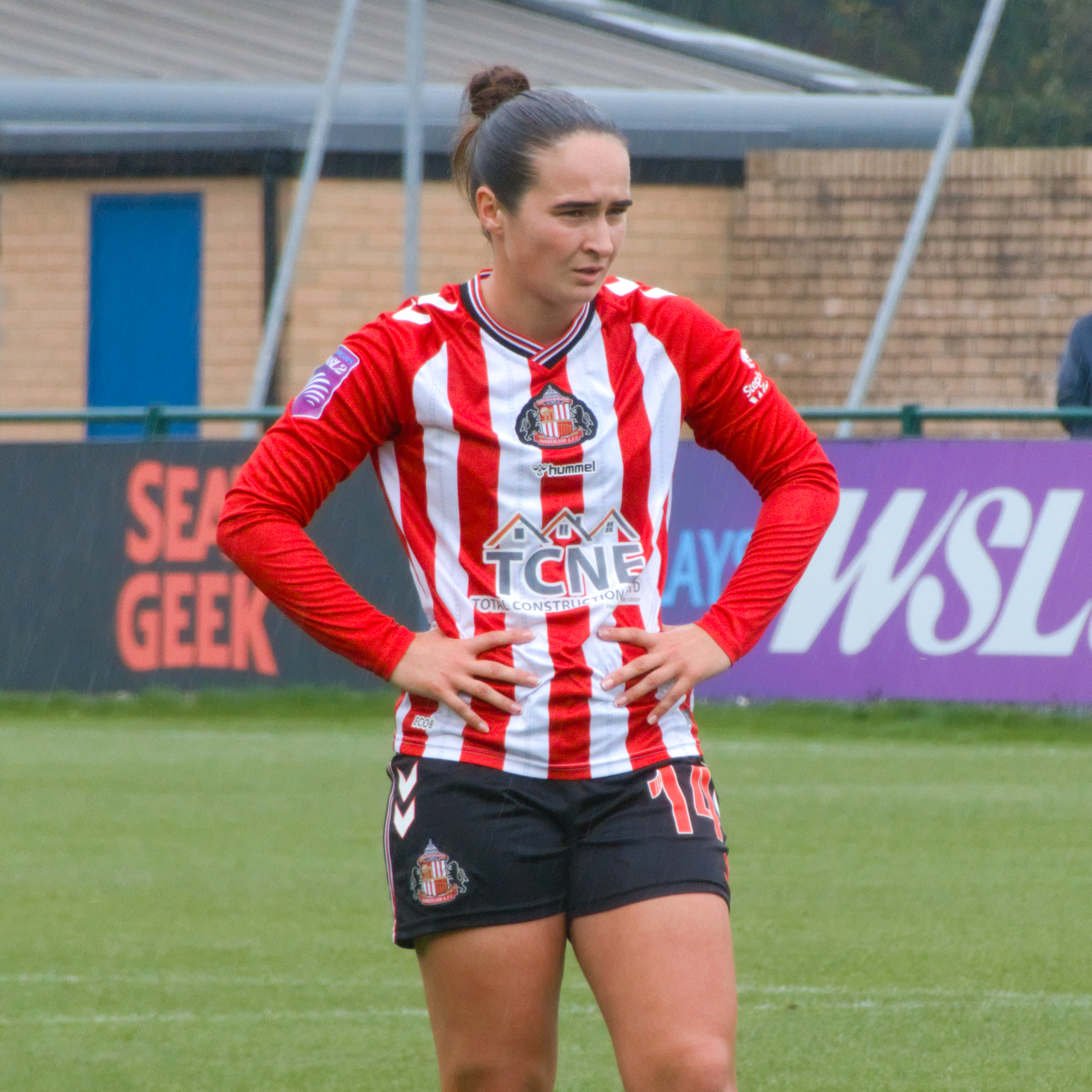
- Fenton with Sunderland in 2025

Personal information
- Full name: Natasha Jane Fenton
- Date of birth: 8 October 1998 (age 28)
- Place of birth: England
- Position: Holding midfielder

Team information
- Current team: Sunderland
- Number: 14

Youth career
- Blackpool
- Blackburn Rovers

Senior career*
Years	Team	Apps	(Gls)
2015–2023	Blackburn Rovers	221	
2023–	Sunderland A.F.C.		
- * Club domestic league appearances and goals

Natasha Jane Fenton is an English professional footballer who plays as a holding midfielder for Sunderland A.F.C. She began her career at Blackpool before joining Blackburn Rovers, with whom she made more than 200 appearances, secured back-to-back FA Women's National League Northern Premier Division titles, won promotion to the Women's Championship, and served as the club captain.

In July 2025, Fenton signed for Sunderland, where she has since become the club's vice-captain. She also studied physiotherapy at Manchester Metropolitan University, qualified as a physiotherapist, and worked in the NHS while continuing her playing career.

== Early life and youth career ==
Fenton moved from Blackpool to join the Blackburn Centre of Excellence at 13 and progressed through their academy before making her senior team debut as a 16-year-old. Fenton attended Baines School in Poulton-Le-Fylde, Lancashire.

== Club career ==
=== Blackburn ===
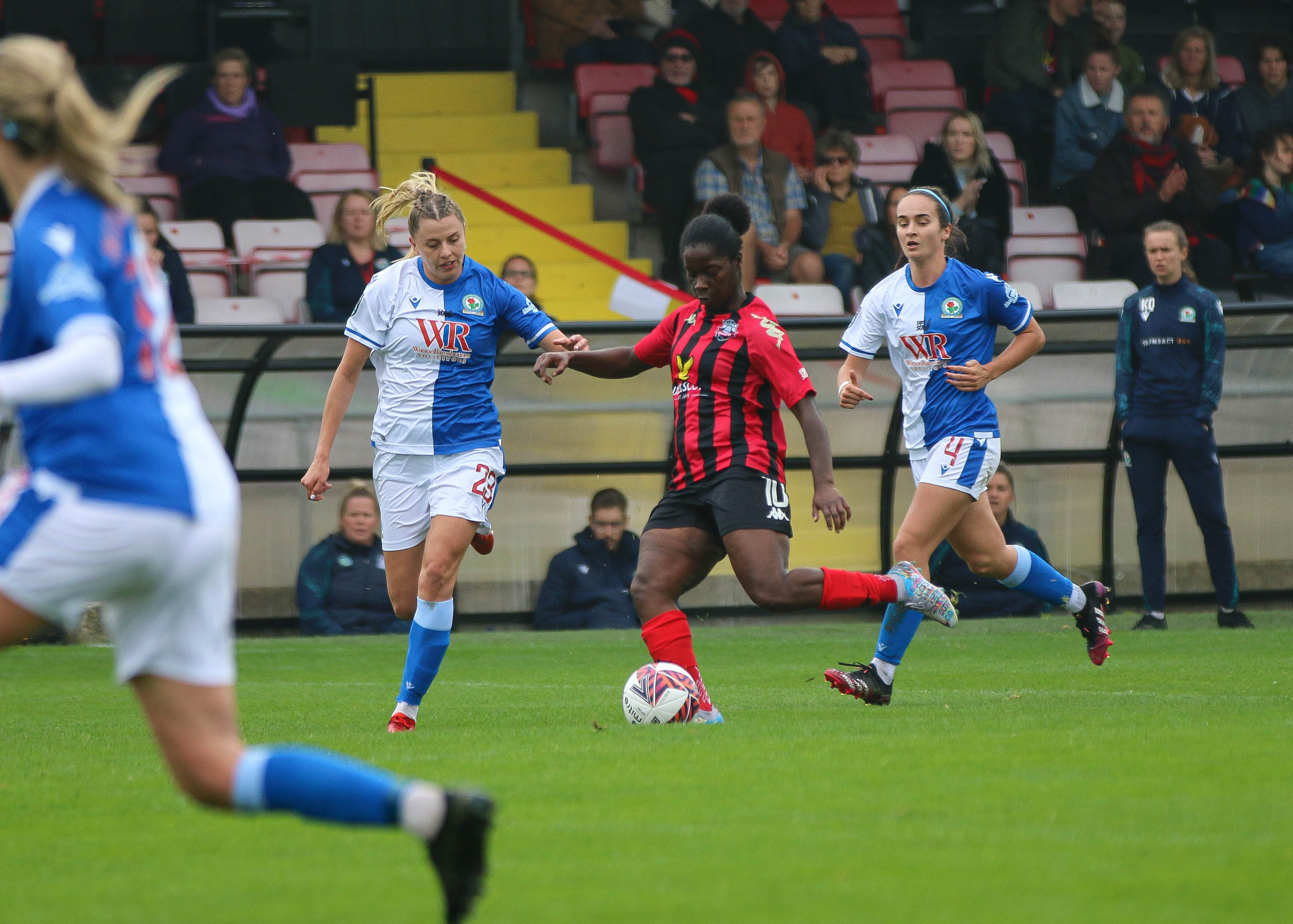
Fenton (rightmost player) with Blackburn in 2021

Fenton made her first-team debut for Blackburn in 2015, at the age of 16. She went on to make her hundredth appearance for the club in November 2018, becoming the youngest player to have done so at the time at the age of 20. Fenton became a key player for the club, being named as the players' player of the year for the second consecutive year after the 2019-20 season, and signing her first professional contract in 2020.

Fenton signed a second contract with the club in June 2022. In September 2022, she made her 200th appearance for the club and was named as the club captain and one of three players forming the team's new leadership group. She had been the team's vice-captain for the three seasons prior to that point, having previously been appointed to the role in November 2020.

During Fenton's 11-year tenure at Blackburn, she made 221 appearances, played every game in the 2016-17, 2017-18, and 2018–19 seasons, in which Blackburn won the FA Women's National League North title twice consecutively, and played an important role in helping the team secure promotion to the Women's Championship, scoring one of three goals in the play-off final against Coventry United W.F.C.

=== Sunderland ===
Fenton joined Sunderland AFC Women in July 2023, moving from Blackburn Rovers after more than a decade with the club. She quickly established herself as a key holding midfielder, known for her defensive contributions, vision, and passing range. During the 2023–24 season, Fenton became vice-captain at the same time that Brianna Westrup became team captain. In March 2024, she signed a new contract, extending her stay at the club until 2026 amid recognition of her leadership, consistent performances, and positive influence on and off the pitch. At that time, she had played every minute of the Women's Championship fixtures during the campaign and helped the team to keep eight clean sheets.

Fenton earned the Barclays Women's Championship Goal of the Month award for March 2025 after scoring a long-range free-kick against Charlton Athletic W.F.C. The goal also earned Fenton a nomination for the league's Goal of the Season award. In May 2026, after the 2025-26 season, she went on to sign a new two-year contract with Sunderland until 2028. At that time, Fenton had made 78 appearances for the club and said "I've loved my time at the club so far, and I'm hoping we can create many more happy memories together."

== Physiotherapy career ==
Fenton gained a sports scholarship through playing football while studying for a Bachelor of Science degree in physiotherapy at Manchester Metropolitan University. Fenton graduated with her degree on 15 July 2022. After qualifying as a physiotherapist, she worked within the NHS alongside her football commitments. During the COVID-19 pandemic, Fenton treated patients affected by the disease, which she described as a difficult, exhausting experience.
