= Caragh Hamilton =

Northern Irish footballer (born 1996)

Personal information
- Full name: Caragh Mary Ruth Hamilton
- Date of birth: 18 October 1996 (age 30)
- Place of birth: Northern Ireland
- Position: Defender

Senior career*
Years	Team	Apps	(Gls)
2012–2017	Glentoran		
2017	Fylkir	14	(1)
2017–2023	Glentoran		
2023–2024	Lewes	20	(1)
2024–2026	Nottingham Forest	31	(0)
2026	→ Sunderland (loan)	0	(0)

International career^{‡}
2012–2013	Northern Ireland U19	6	(0)
2012–	Northern Ireland	53	(7)
- * Club domestic league appearances and goals as of 3 February 2026 ‡ National team caps and goals as of 3 February 2026

Caragh Mary Ruth Hamilton (née Milligan; born 18 October 1996) is a Northern Irish footballer who plays as a defender for Women's Super League 2 club Sunderland, on loan from Nottingham Forest, and has appeared for the Northern Ireland national team.

== Club career ==
Nottingham Forest announced the signing of Hamilton of a 1 year contract from Lewes on 9 August 2024.

On 3 February 2026, Hamilton joined WSL 2 side Sunderland for the remainder of the 2025 26 season.

== International career ==
Hamilton has been capped for the Northern Ireland national team, appearing for the team during the 2019 FIFA Women's World Cup qualifying cycle. Hamilton, then Milligan, made her senior debut on 15 February 2012 against Belgium, becoming the youngest player to represent Northern Ireland at 15 years and 121 days old.
