= Redbridge Community School =

Coordinates: 50.922°N 1.465°W

Location
- Cuckmere Lane; Southampton, Hampshire, SO16 9RJ; England

Information
- Type: Foundation school
- Motto: "Aspiration Respect Opportunity Excellence"
- Established: 1958
- Local authority: Southampton
- Trust: Reach Cooperative Trust
- Department for Education URN: 116453 Tables
- Ofsted: Reports
- Head teacher: Jason S Ashley
- Gender: mixed
- Age: 11 to 16
- Enrolment: 2000
- Publication: "The Bridge" Newsletter
- Website: www.redbridgeschool.org.uk

Redbridge Community School is a mixed secondary school in west Southampton, Hampshire, in the south of England.

The school previously held specialist school status as a sports college. Today it is a foundation school administered by Southampton City Council and the Reach Cooperative Trust.

== School performance and inspection ==
In inspections by Oftsed in 2005, 2008 and 2013, the school was judged outstanding. However, Ofsted judged the school required improvement during an inspection in 2016. During inspections by Ofsted in 2018 and 2023, the school was judged good.

In 2016, Redbridge was one of five schools in Hampshire which fell below the government's target to ensure students achieved five good GCSE grades alongside sufficient progress in English and Maths.

== Notable former pupils ==
- Megan Collett, footballer
- Chance Perdomo, actor
- Phil Warner, footballer
