= Emily Scarr =

English footballer

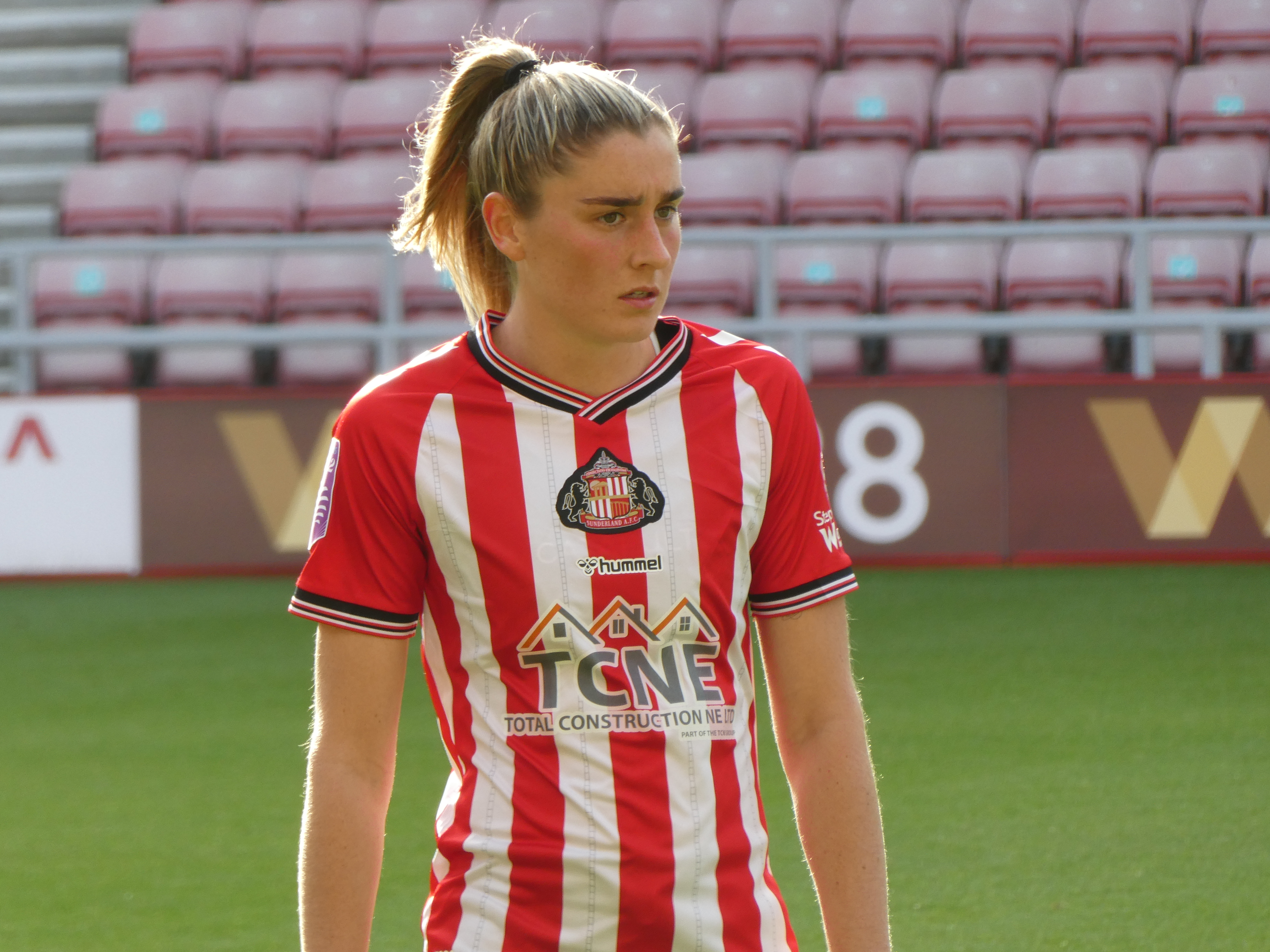
- Scarr playing for Sunderland in 2025

Personal information
- Full name: Emily Louise Scarr
- Date of birth: 15 September 1999 (age 27)
- Place of birth: Bishop Auckland, England
- Position: Forward

Team information
- Current team: Sunderland
- Number: 8

Senior career*
Years	Team	Apps	(Gls)
2015–2020	Middlesbrough	85	(56)
2021–	Sunderland	62	(27)
- * Club domestic league appearances and goals as of 15 November 2026

Emily Louise Scarr (born 15 September 1999) is an English professional footballer who plays as a forward for the Women's Championship club Sunderland.

== Early life ==
Scarr was born in Bishop Auckland and attended Whitworth Park Academy in Spennymoor.

== Career ==
=== Middlesbrough ===
Scarr made her debut for Middlesbrough on 28 January 2016, starting in a 1–1 draw against Chester-le-Street Town. She started in all of Middlesbrough's eight remaining league games, scoring 7 goals in total, and helping the club win the 2015–16 Northern Division One.

On 11 December 2016, Scarr scored five goals in an 8–3 win against Nottingham Forest. On 24 January 2018, following a third round 4–3 comeback against Liverpool Feds, she was named the FA Cup player of the round. She scored a hat-trick in a 7–1 win against Wolverhampton Wanderers on 28 January 2018, and ended the 2017–18 season as Middlesbrough's top goal scorer, scoring 28 goals in all competitions.

Along with teammate Tyler Dodds, Scarr was the club's joint top goal scorer for the 2018–19 season, scoring 14 goals in total. In her five years playing for Middlesbrough, Scarr scored 56 goals in 85 league matches.

=== Sunderland ===
On 2 July 2020, it was reported that Scarr had left Middlesbrough and that Sunderland were seeking to sign her. On 18 August 2020, Sunderland announced that they had signed Scarr. She won two consecutive player of the year awards for her performances during the 2022–23 and 2023–24 seasons. In May 2026, Scarr signed a new two-year deal until 2028. Upon signing her new contract, she said she was "really pleased to sign a new deal with the club" and "looking forward to seeing what we can achieve next season".

== Personal life ==
In December 2021, it was reported that Scarr had recently been the victim of drink spiking.

== Career statistics ==
As of match played 15 November 2026

Appearances and goals by club, season and competition
Club	Season	League			National cup		League cup		Other		Total	
Club	Season	Division	Apps	Goals	Apps	Goals	Apps	Goals	Apps	Goals	Apps	Goals
Middlesbrough	2015–16	Northern Division One	9	7	0	0	0	0	0	0	9	7
Middlesbrough	2016–17	Northern Premier Division	20	14	1	0	2	0	0	0	23	14
Middlesbrough	2017–18	Northern Premier Division	21	20	3	5	2	3	0	0	26	28
Middlesbrough	2018–19	Northern Premier Division	23	11	1	1	0	0	3 (Note: Appearances in the FA Women's National League Plate)	2	27	14
Middlesbrough	2019–20 (Note: Cancelled as a result of the COVID-19 pandemic.)	Northern Premier Division	12	4	1	1	0	0	4	0	17	5
Middlesbrough	Total		85	56	6	7	4	3	7	2	102	68
Sunderland	2020–21	Northern Premier Division	0	0	1	0	0	0	—		1	0
Sunderland	2021–22	Women's Championship	3	4	1	1	4	0	—		8	5
Sunderland	2022–23	Women's Championship	5	8	1	0	2	0	—		8	8
Sunderland	2023–24	Women's Championship	5	7	1	0	5	1	—		11	8
Sunderland	2024–25	Women's Championship	20	2	3	1	2	0	—		25	3
Sunderland	2025–26	Women's Super League 2	22	6	1	0	3	1	—		26	7
Sunderland	2026–27	Women's Super League 2	7	0	0	0	4	0	—		11	0
Sunderland	Total		62	27	8	2	20	2	—		90	31
Career total			147	83	14	9	24	5	7	2	192	99

== Honours ==
Middlesbrough

- FA Premier League Northern Division One: 2015–16

Individual

- Sunderland Player of the Year: 2022–23, 2023–24
