= Jamie Finn =

Irish footballer (born 1998)

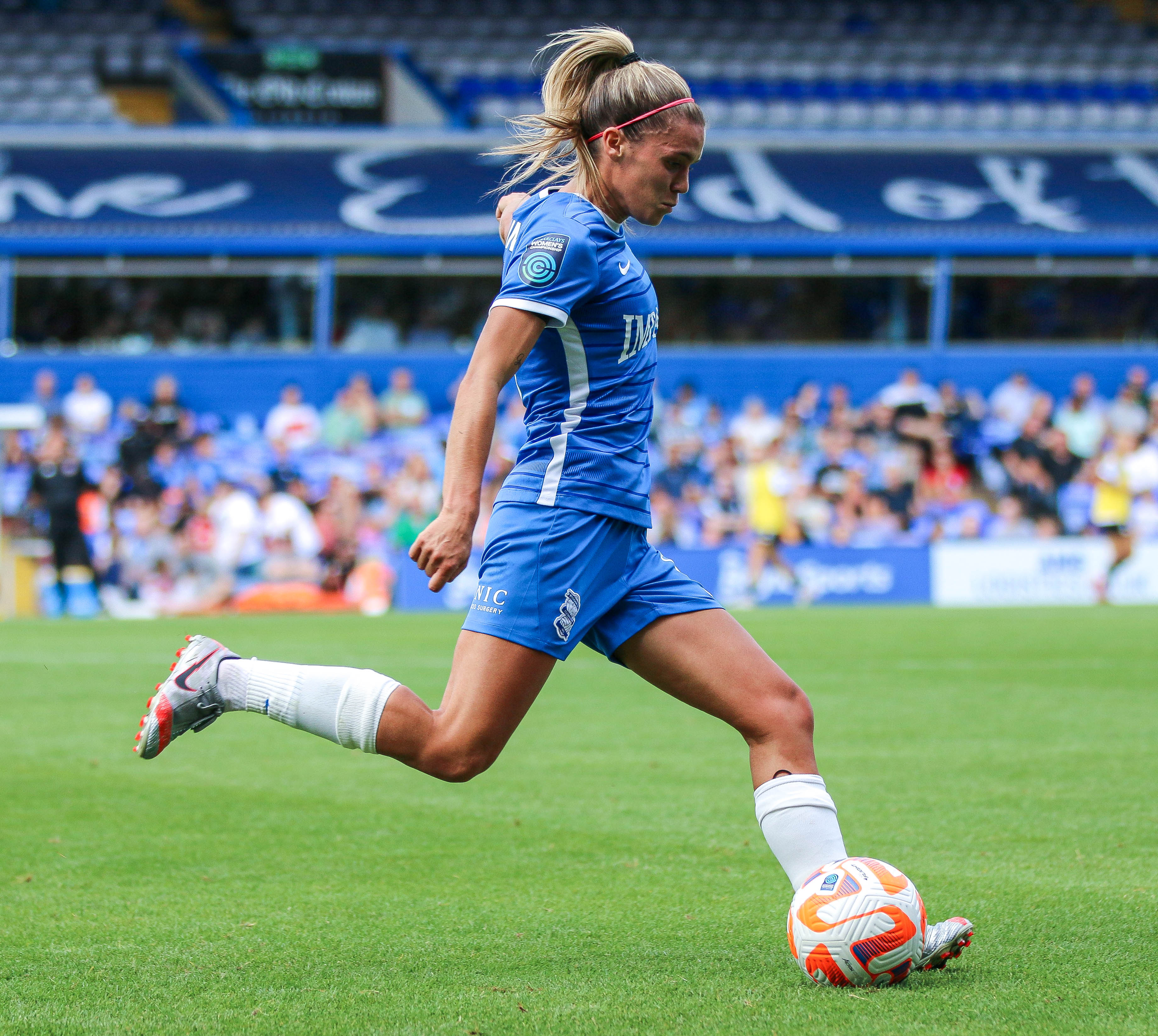
- Finn with Birmingham City in 2022

Personal information
- Date of birth: 21 April 1998 (age 28)
- Place of birth: Dublin, Ireland
- Height: 5 ft 5 in (1.65 m)
- Positions: Defender; midfielder

Team information
- Current team: Sunderland A.F.C. Women
- Number: 8

Youth career
- 2006-2011: Swords Manor F.C
- Shelbourne

College career
Years	Team	Apps	(Gls)
2016	Florida Gulf Coast Eagles	5	(1)

Senior career*
Years	Team	Apps	(Gls)
2015	Raheny United		
2015–2021	Shelbourne		
2021–2025	Birmingham City	56	(1)
2025–2026	Sunderland A.F.C. Women	15	(0)

International career^{‡}
2013–2015	Republic of Ireland U17	11	(1)
2015–2017	Republic of Ireland U19	11	(1)
2019–	Republic of Ireland	23	(1)
- * Club domestic league appearances and goals as of 19 April 2026 ‡ National team caps and goals as of 9 October 2026

Jamie Finn (born 21 April 1998) is an Irish professional footballer who plays for English Women's Super League 2 club Sunderland A.F.C. and the Republic of Ireland women's national team. She previously represented Shelbourne in her native Dublin and is capable of playing in either defence or midfield. In 2016 Finn spent a short time in college soccer with Florida Gulf Coast Eagles, where her coach Jim Blankenship declared: "Jamie is an excellent ball-winner and her ability to play along the backline and in midfield will be a great asset to us".

== Club career ==
Finn was born in Dublin and grew up in Swords. She played soccer with Swords Manor from five years old until she had to leave at 13 due to rules against mixed-sex football. She then moved to Shelbourne's girls' youth system.

Finn joined Raheny United during the 2014–15 Women's National League season. In April 2015 she scored a late equaliser in the WNL Cup final at Tolka Park, to force extra time. Katie McCabe then scored to secure Raheny's 3–2 win over rivals Peamount United. Before the 2015–16 campaign Raheny United merged into Shelbourne, so Finn returned to The Reds.

In 2016 Finn played college soccer for the Florida Gulf Coast Eagles, she started three of her five appearances, scoring one goal and serving one assist.

After re-joining Shelbourne, Finn represented the club in the 2017–18 UEFA Women's Champions League qualifying round in Belfast. She displayed good form in the 2019 Women's National League, being named WNL Player of the Month for May 2019 and named in the WNL Team of the Season.

In August 2021 Finn left Shelbourne to sign a one-year professional contract with English FA Women's Super League (WSL) club Birmingham City. In July 2022 she agreed to extend her contract with relegated Birmingham for another year, with the option of a further year.

On 24 July 2025, it was announced that Finn had signed with Women's Super League 2 club Sunderland.

== International career ==
=== Youth ===
Finn represented Ireland at schoolgirl level while she attended St. Finian's Community College. At the 2014 FAI International Football Awards she was named Under-16 Women's International Player of the Year. She captained the Republic of Ireland women's national under-17 football team in the 2015 UEFA Women's Under-17 Championship qualification mini tournament in Serbia, and at the final tournament in Finland.

The previous year Finn had been selected for the Republic of Ireland women's national under-19 football team which qualified for the UEFA Women's Under-19 Championship finals for the first time in 2014. She was injured in a training camp the week before the tournament and was forced to withdraw. At the 2017 UEFA Women's Under-19 Championship qualification mini-tournament in Skopje, Finn captained Ireland's Under-19s to a 10–0 win over their hosts.

=== Senior ===
Senior Republic of Ireland national team coach Vera Pauw called up Finn for the first time for the UEFA Women's Euro 2022 qualifier against Greece on 12 November 2019. She started and played the whole game to win her first senior cap as Ireland succumbed to an injury-time equaliser and drew 1–1 in Athens. Finn was surprised to start the match, but hoped international recognition and her strong form with Shelbourne would secure her a move to a professional club.

Finn won a second cap in the final qualifier, a 3–1 defeat by Germany at Tallaght Stadium on 1 December 2020. On 8 April 2021 she was drafted in as a late replacement for Ruesha Littlejohn, who was injured in training, ahead of Ireland's friendly with Denmark. She was named Player of the Match as a defensive midfielder in Ireland's 1–0 defeat. On the 22nd February 2024, Finn tore her anterior cruciate ligament (ACL) during training camp in Italy.

=== International appearances ===
Appearances and goals and year
National team	Year	Apps	Goals
Republic of Ireland	2019	1	0
Republic of Ireland	2020	1	0
Republic of Ireland	2021	7	0
Republic of Ireland	2022	5	0
Republic of Ireland	2023	6	0
Republic of Ireland	2025	3	1
Total		23	1

List of international goals scored by Jamie Finn
No.	Date	Venue	Opponent	Score	Result	Competition
1.	9 October 2026	Astana Arena, Astana, Kazakhstan	Kazakhstan	6–0	8–0	2027 FIFA Women's World Cup qualification play-offs
