= Katie Kitching =

New Zealand footballer

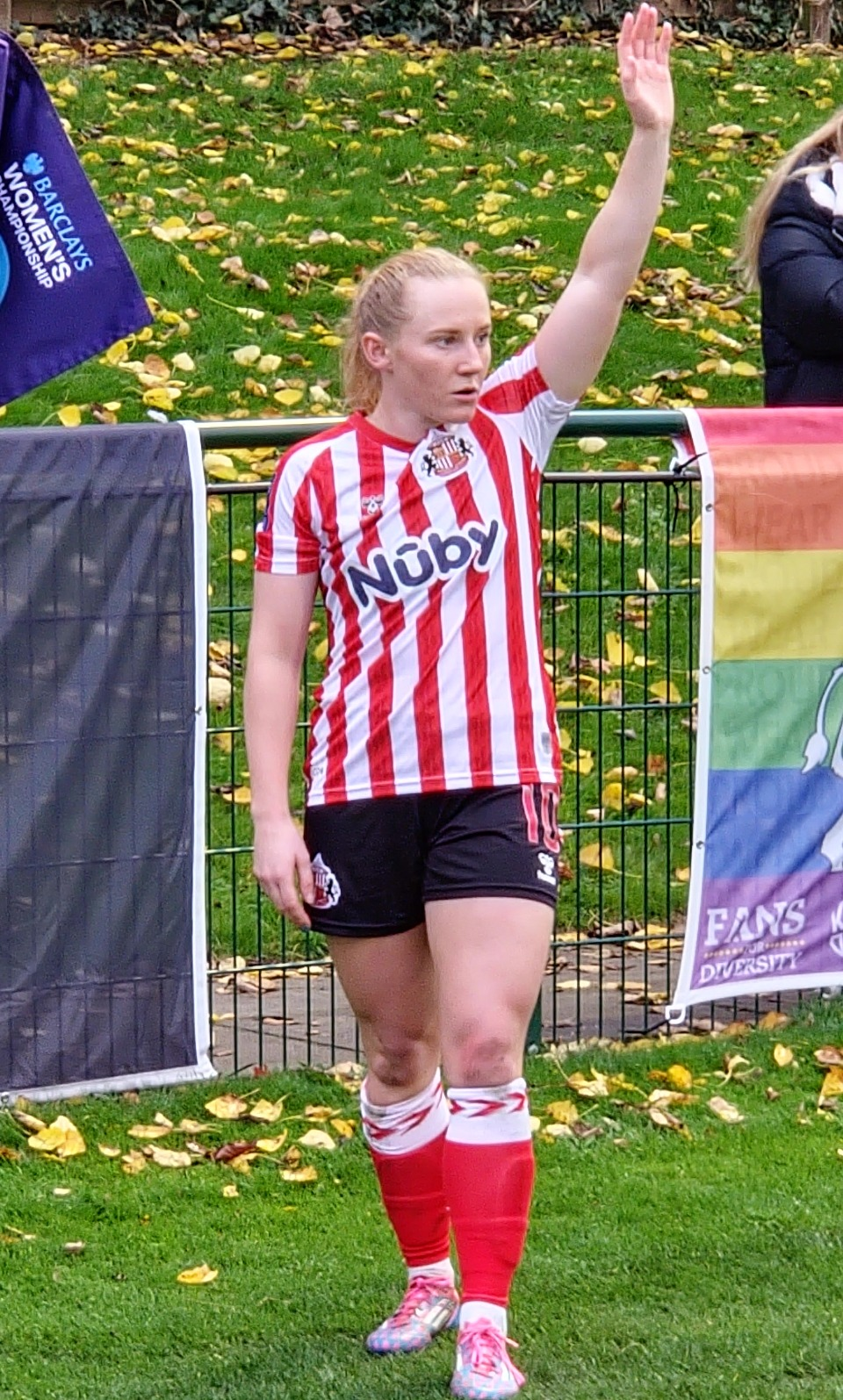
- Kitching with Sunderland in 2024

Personal information
- Full name: Katie Meredith Kitching
- Date of birth: 6 September 1998 (age 28)
- Place of birth: Bedale, England
- Height: 5 ft 3 in (1.60 m)
- Position: Midfielder

Team information
- Current team: Sunderland
- Number: 10

College career
Years	Team	Apps	(Gls)
2017–2021	South Florida Bulls	85	(6)

Senior career*
Years	Team	Apps	(Gls)
2022–2023	London City Lionesses	20	(0)
2023–	Sunderland	70	(17)

International career^{‡}
2023–	New Zealand	28	(9)
- * Club domestic league appearances and goals as of 16 November 2026 ‡ National team caps and goals as of 23 May 2026

Katie Meredith Kitching is a footballer who plays as a midfielder for Sunderland. Born in England, she is a New Zealand international.

== Early life ==
Kitching is a native of Well, England.

== Education ==
Katie went to Bedale High School before going to the USA for further education.

Kitching attended the University of South Florida in the United States.

== Career ==
On 6 July 2023, Kitching was announced at Sunderland on a one year contract. At Sunderland, she was described as "bringing an impressive athleticism further ahead... nothing short of a revelation, a box-to-box midfielder who is outrunning just about every opponent in her path". After being named as the 2024-25 player of the season for Sunderland, it was announced on 20 June 2025 that she had signed a contract extension with the club. She scored the winning goal for Sunderland in the River Wear derby on 19 September 2025 in a 2–1 victory over Durham.

== International career ==
Kitching was selected for New Zealand's 2024 Olympic squad.

== Style of play ==
Kitching mainly operates as a midfielder and is known for her passing ability.

== International goals ==
No.	Date	Venue	Opponent	Score	Result	Competition
1.	19 February 2024	FFS Football Stadium, Apia, Samoa	Solomon Islands	9–1	11–1	2024 OFC Women's Olympic Qualifying Tournament
2.	19 February 2024	FFS Football Stadium, Apia, Samoa	Solomon Islands	10–1	11–1	2024 OFC Women's Olympic Qualifying Tournament
3.	6 April 2024	Rugby League Park, Christchurch, New Zealand	Thailand	3–0	4–0	Friendly
4.	6 April 2024	Rugby League Park, Christchurch, New Zealand	Thailand	4–0	4–0	Friendly
5.	13 July 2024	Stade Louis Darragon, Vichy, France	Zambia	1–1	1–1	Friendly
6.	31 May 2025	Marbella Football Center, San Pedro Alcántara, Spain	Venezuela	1–1	1–3	Friendly
7.	27 February 2026	National Stadium, Honiara, Solomon Islands	Samoa	4–0	8–0	2027 FIFA Women's World Cup qualification
8.	11 April 2026	FMG Stadium Waikato, Hamilton, New Zealand	Fiji	4–0	5–0	2027 FIFA Women's World Cup qualification
9.	15 April 2026	North Harbour Stadium, Auckland, New Zealand	Papua New Guinea	1–0	1–0	2027 FIFA Women's World Cup qualification

== Personal life ==
Kitching was born to a New Zealand mother and English father.
