= Eppleton Colliery Welfare Ground =

Sports venue in Hetton-le-Hole, England

- Eppleton CW
- Location within Tyne and Wear
- Address: Park View, Welfare Rd, Hetton-le-Hole, Houghton le Spring DH5 9NA
- Location: Hetton-le-Hole
- Coordinates: 54.8216°N 1.4554°W
- Owner: Hetton Town Trust
- Capacity: 2,500 (250 seated)
- Type: Football Ground
- Surface: Grass

Construction
- Built: 1929
- Renovated: 1993

Tenants
- Eppleton CW F.C. Sunderland Reserves Sunderland A.F.C. Women Sunderland Ladies County Durham FA Hetton Lyons FC: 1929–2005; 2007–present 1989–present 2009–2022 ?–2009

Website
- http://www.hettontowntrust.co.uk/

Eppleton Colliery Welfare Ground (often shortened to Eppleton CW) is a football ground located in Hetton-le-Hole in the City of Sunderland, Tyne and Wear. It was created as part of the miners' welfare in order to provide recreational facilities to the coal miners at the Eppleton Colliery. It featured facilities for both cricket and Association football. It became the home ground of Eppleton CWFC in 1929. The team folded in 2005.

The ground was redeveloped in 1993 at a cost of £3m after Eppleton CWFC reached the Northern League Division One. The main stand was rebuilt, incorporating a cantilever roof and seating for 250.

In 2007, Sunderland Reserves moved to Eppleton CW after leaving New Ferens Park in Durham. It continues to be the home ground of Sunderland U23s, though academy rules mean they must play at least four games per year at the Stadium of Light. It is also the home ground of Sunderland A.F.C. Ladies, who moved back to Eppleton CW in 2018 after spending one year at Mariners Park in South Shields F.C.

Eppleton CW is the home of County Durham FA U18s teams, and is also the neutral venue for the final of the Durham Challenge Cup which has been contested since 1884. The final traditionally takes place every Good Friday.

Hetton Burn runs alongside the West side of the ground. Behind the goal on the North side, is the Hetton Centre, a community centre, evolved from the original miners' welfare building, operated by the Hetton Town Trust. The centre contains the Bob Paisley Bar, named after the former Liverpool F.C. manager who was born in Hetton-le-Hole.
