= Brianna Westrup =

Scottish footballer (born 1997)

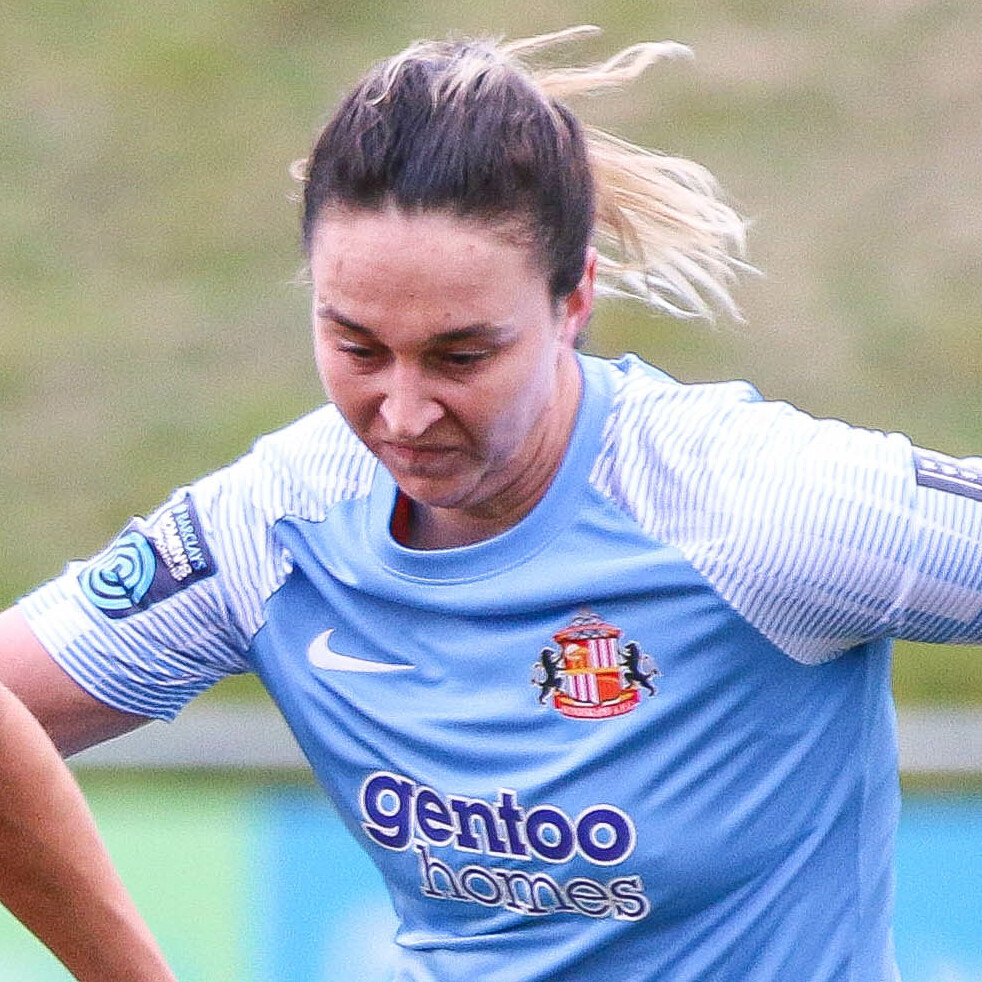
- Westrup in 2023

Personal information
- Full name: Brianna Maureen Westrup
- Date of birth: 22 February 1997 (age 29)
- Place of birth: Corona del Mar, California, U.S.
- Position: Defender

Team information
- Current team: Sunderland
- Number: 27

College career
| Years | Team | Apps | (Gls) |
| 2015–2018 | Virginia Cavaliers | 79 | (6) |

Senior career*
| Years | Team | Apps | (Gls) |
| 2019 | B.93 | | |
| 2019–2020 | Newcastle United | | |
| 2020–2022 | Rangers | | |
| 2022– | Sunderland | 42 | (4) |

International career^{‡}
| 2021– | Scotland | 2 | (0) |
- * Club domestic league appearances and goals as of 30 January 2025 ‡ National team caps and goals as of 11 June 2021

Brianna Maureen Westrup (born 22 February 1997) is a footballer who plays as a defender for Sunderland in the Women's Super League 2 and the Scotland national team. Known as a strong defensive player, Westrup has played in America, Denmark, England and Scotland.

== Club career ==
Westrup was born in California and received a scholarship to play soccer for the University of Virginia. As a child, she played football, basketball and water polo, resuming playing basketball after signing for the University of Virginia. Westrup started playing basketball again to avoid injury whilst playing football. During her time with Corona del Mar's basketball team, she won the league title, with 14 points and six steals during the season. Westrup was first team all-league and the best defensive player in the league.

She first moved to Europe to play for Danish club B.93 in 2019.

After a spell with English club Newcastle United, Westrup joined Scottish club Rangers in 2020. Westrup won the club's player of the year award in her first season there. During the 2023 season, she was named the club's captain.

== International career ==
Westrup was eligible to play for Scotland because her mother was born there. She was first selected for the Scotland squad in June 2021, and she made her international debut that month in a 1–0 win against Northern Ireland.

== Style of play ==
Westrup is described as "defensively very solid" and is known for her strength and physicality. She has been described as having "aspects of her game are similar to those of the incredibly gifted centre backs in Division 1 Féminine and the WSL".

== Honours ==
Rangers

- Scottish Women's Premier League: 2021-22
