= Megan Collett =

English footballer

- Collett playing for Southampton in 2023

Personal information
- Full name: Megan Elizabeth Evelyn Collett
- Date of birth: 11 July 2005 (age 21)
- Place of birth: England
- Height: 1.65 m (5 ft 5 in)
- Position: Right-back

Team information
- Current team: Southampton
- Number: 23

Youth career
- Southampton

Senior career*
Years	Team	Apps	(Gls)
2021–	Southampton	52	(3)

International career^{‡}
2024	England U19	1	(0)
2024–	England U23	0	(0)
- * Club domestic league appearances and goals as of 21:12, 24 November 2024 (UTC) (Note: Includes appearances and goals in the National League and Championship combined.) ‡ National team caps and goals as of 17:12, 20 November 2024 (UTC)

Megan Elizabeth Evelyn Collett (born 11 July 2005) is an English professional footballer who plays as a right-back for Women's Championship club Southampton and the England under-23 team.

== Early life ==
Collett attended Redbridge Community School in Southampton alongside teammate Milly Mott.

== Youth career ==
She is a product of Southampton's Regional Talent Centre, played for the under-16s, followed by the development team where she scored 4 goals in 17 appearances.

== Club career ==
Collett was described as an integral part of the team during their 2021–22 promotion winning season from the National League South to the Women's Championship. She started in four matches, made a total of six appearances, and scored one goal during the season.

On 17 July 2023, Collet signed her first professional contract with Southampton aged 18.

In August 2024, speaking to BBC Radio Solent, she stated that Southampton's ambitions include promotion to the Women's Super League, having finished fourth place in the 2023–24 season.

Confident ahead of the South Coast derby on 13 October 2024, Collett scored her first goal of the 2023–24 season against newly promoted Portsmouth in a 5–0 thrashing at Fratton Park. The following month later, after a convincing start to the season, she remained positive about promotion.

== International career ==
On 22 November 2022, Collett received her first call up to the England under-19s, where she was an unused substitute in the game against the Netherlands. On 27 February 2024, she made her debut for the under-19s in a 2–2 draw with Norway. On 20 November 2024, Collett received her first call up to the England under-23s for European League matches against Norway and Sweden.

== Honours ==
Southampton

- FA National League Cup: 2021–22
- FA National League: 2021–22
