= Jenna Dear =

English footballer

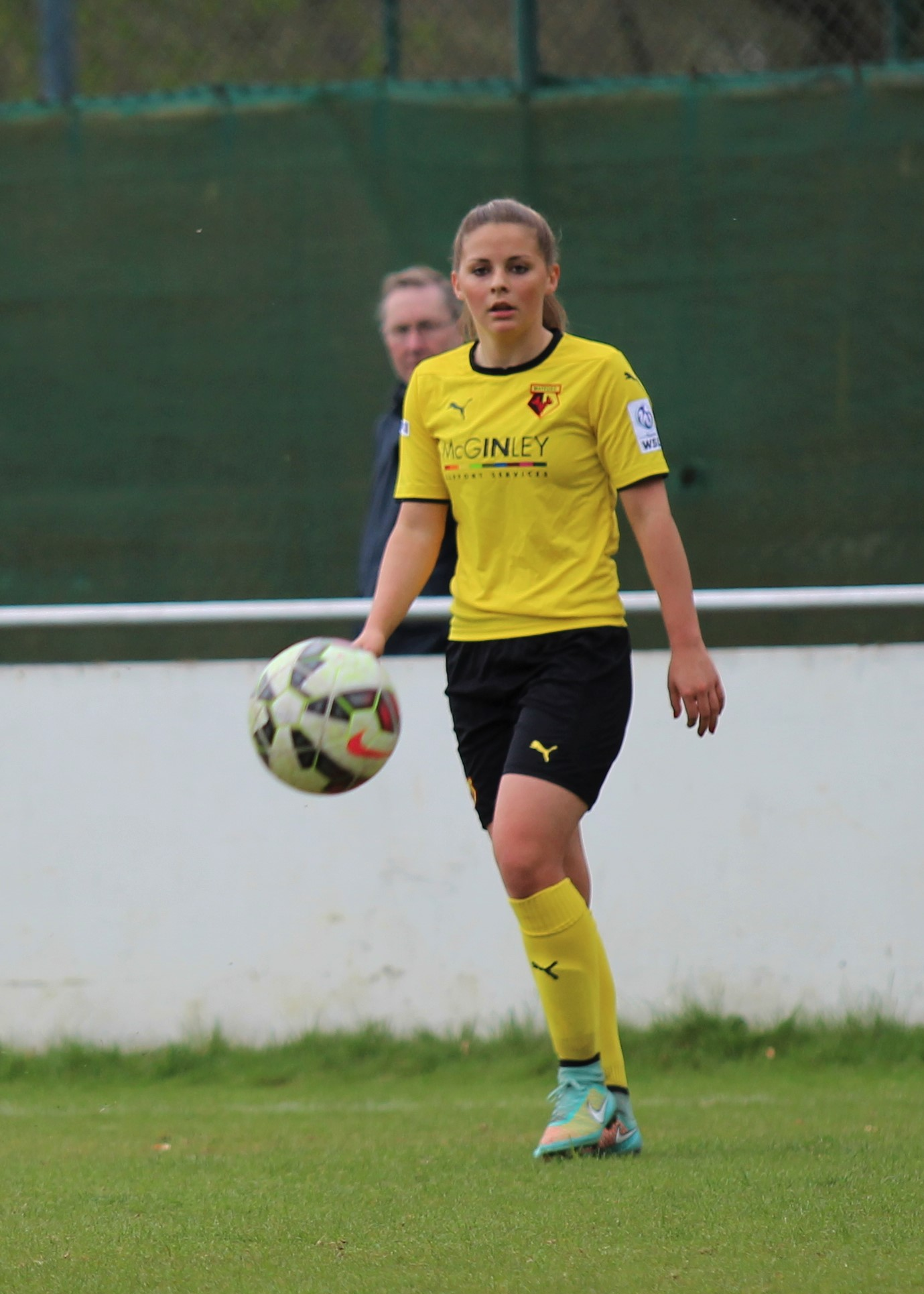
- Dear with Watford in 2015

Personal information
- Full name: Jenna May Dear
- Date of birth: 29 May 1996 (age 30)
- Place of birth: Hayes, England
- Height: 1.70 m (5 ft 7 in)
- Position: Midfielder

Team information
- Current team: Ipswich Town
- Number: 23

Senior career*
| Years | Team | Apps | (Gls) |
| 2014–15 | Chelsea | 2 | (0) |
| 2015 | → Watford (loan) | 7 | (1) |
| 2016–2017 | Everton | 8 | (0) |
| 2017–2018 | Sheffield FC | 15 | (2) |
| 2018–2019 | Vålerenga | 15 | (1) |
| 2019–2021 | FC Fleury 91 | 18 | (0) |
| 2021–2023 | Dijon | 29 | (3) |
| 2023–2025 | Sunderland | 26 | (6) |
| 2025– | Ipswich Town | 9 | (0) |

International career^{‡}
| 2014–2016 | England U19 | 13 | (2) |
| 2016 | England U20 | 2 | (0) |
- * Club domestic league appearances and goals as of 29 November 2025 (UTC) ‡ National team caps and goals as of 9 October 2017

Jenna May Dear (born 29 May 1996) is an English footballer who plays as a midfielder for Women's Super League 2 club Ipswich Town.

== Career ==
Born in Hayes, Hillingdon, Dear spent her early years at the Reading FC Girls' Centre of Excellence and played for Yiewsley Predators and Hayes & Yeading Youth.

Dear joined Chelsea LFC at the age of 14, and went on loan to Watford Ladies in March 2015 for the first half of that season. She joined Everton LFC in January 2016. After taking four months away from football due to personal issues, Dear moved to Sheffield in April 2017. She then had a spell with Vålerenga Fotball Damer in Norway.

Dear joined French side Fleury in 2019, but left in 2021 due to problems with sexual harassment, misconduct and a toxic culture at the club. From Fleury she transferred to Dijon.

In July 2023, Dear returned to England, signing with Championship club Sunderland. She spent two seasons at the club, during which time she scored six goals.

On 31 July 2025, Dear was announced at Ipswich Town on a permanent transfer as the club prepared for its first season in the second division. She made her debut for Ipswich as a substitute in the team's first WSL2 match against Southampton, and quickly became a key player as the season went on.

== International career ==
Dear represented England at under-15 level, captaining the side at the age of 14. She made the move up to under-19 level, where she made her debut against Sweden on 15 July 2014, and has since also played for the under-20 team.

== Personal life ==
In January 2025, Dear was stopped by police in Newcastle city centre after driving in excess of the speed limit and failing to stop for a red light. She was subsequently convicted of drink-driving and disqualified from driving for 12 months.
