= Sunderland A.F.C. Women =

Sunderland AFC Women
- Full name: Sunderland Association Football Club Women
- Nickname: The Lasses
- Founded: 1989; 37 years ago (as The Kestrels)
- Ground: Eppleton Colliery Welfare Ground
- Capacity: 2,500 (250 seated)
- Coordinates: 54°49′15″N 1°27′21″W
- Owner: Bay Collective (Sixth Street Partners)
- Manager: Melanie Reay
- League: Women's Super League 2
- 2025–26: WSL 2, 8th of 12
- Website: safc.com/women
Home colours	Away colours	Third colours

Sunderland Association Football Club Women is an English women's football club that plays in the Women's Super League 2. They play their home games at the Eppleton Colliery Welfare Ground in Hetton-le-Hole, in the City of Sunderland, Tyne and Wear.

Sunderland won the FA Women's Premier League Northern Division in 2004–05 to reach the top tier National Division. After relegation in 2007, they returned to the National Division in 2009 and also lost that season's Women's FA Cup final, 2–1 to holders Arsenal at Pride Park Stadium.

The club's bid to join the FA WSL for the initial 2011 season was controversially rejected in favour of the relatively newly formed, but big spending, Manchester City. This decision led to the departure of many star players (3 of whom represented England in the 2015 World Cup) and is thought to have damaged the development of the women's game in the North East for years to come. Despite this they responded by winning the Premier League National Division, which had become the second tier, on three consecutive occasions and also collected the 2011–12 FA Women's Premier League Cup. In 2014, Sunderland were accepted into the second division of a newly expanded FA WSL. They won the league on the final day of the season and were promoted into FA WSL 1 for 2015.

At the end of the 2017–18 season, Sunderland A.F.C. Ladies were unsuccessful with their application for a license in both FA Women's Super League and FA Women's Championship, meaning the Lady Black Cats, were demoted to the FA Women's National League North, for the 2018–19 season. In 2021, the club made a successful application to join the FA Women’s Championship, resulting in their promotion to join the league for the 2021–2022 season.

== History ==
=== Early history ===
The Football Association (FA) banned affiliated referees from officiating women's football matches and affiliated grounds and pitches from hosting them from 1921 to 1970. The Women's Football Association (WFA) was formed in 1969 to govern Women's football in England until it ceased to exist in 1993, when the FA took over this responsibility.

The club began in 1989 as a five-a-side team called The Kestrels. It played its first match in an informal friendly against Darlington Ladies on 26 July 1989 and won the WFA Yorkshire and Humberside League in 1990. Over the next decade, they competed in the Northern Premier as Cowgate Kestrels, RTM Newcastle Kestrels and Blyth Spartans Kestrels.

In 2000, the club merged with an independent Sunderland Ladies club and the Sunderland A.F.C. men's club to become Sunderland Women's FC after winning promotion to the top tier FA Women's Premier League National Division for the first time. The new club was originally financed as part of the established professional Sunderland A.F.C. men's club.

=== 2000–2010 ===
Following financial troubles in 2004, the women's side was forced to become financially independent. Sunderland A.F.C. only provided some kit and the home ground.

In 2001–02 Sunderland won one league game all season and were relegated back to the Northern Division. On 10 April 2005, they won promotion from the Northern Division as champions. In the 2005–06 season, they finished 9th in the league (then the penultimate position), but stayed up after tying a promotion/relegation playoff against Southern runners-up Bristol City W.F.C. 5–5 on aggregate.

With the emergence of Jill Scott and Steph Houghton, the club began to develop a reputation for producing England women's national football team players. On 6 May 2007, with all their games finished and only having 11 points, Sunderland were relegated after Cardiff City beat Doncaster Belles 3–2.

In Season 2007–08 Sunderland finished in 3rd position in The Women's Premier League, Northern Division, behind Champions Nottingham Forest and Lincoln City. The top 3 were almost in a league of their own as Sunderland finished 17 points ahead of 4th placed Newcastle – who only finished 15 points ahead of bottom-of-the-table Crewe Alexandra.

With team re-building completed, the 2008–09 season began with high hopes for the Wearsiders who had six England youth internationals in their ranks and had recently recruited full England international midfielder Kelly McDougall from Everton Ladies.

On 22 March 2009, under the leadership of club captain Stephanie Bannon, Sunderland reached the final of the FA Women's Cup after beating Chelsea 3–0. Goals from Williams (2) and Gutteridge ensured their place in the final against holders Arsenal at Pride Park Stadium, home of Derby County on 4 May. In the final, favourites Arsenal beat Sunderland 2–1. Despite dominating possession and creating several chances, Arsenal found it difficult to convert their opportunities. Arsenal's Katie Chapman scored in the first half, their second coming in extended 2nd half injury-time from Kim Little. However, Sunderland never gave up and scored a consolation goal from Kelly McDougall just before the final whistle. Lucy Bronze gave a superb display at right-back, earning herself the Player of the Match Award for the Black Cats.

Sunderland won promotion to the National Premier Division after defeating Preston 4–0 away in the last match of the 2008–09 season.

Back in the top flight, Sunderland exceeded expectations and topped the league for five months. They also handed Arsenal Ladies only their second league defeat in six years.

=== 2010–2020 ===
The club's bid to join the newly established FA WSL was rejected on commercial and marketing grounds – leading to the departure of star players Lucy Bronze, Jordan Nobbs, Lucy Staniforth, and Helen Alderson.

Despite the exodus of these players, Sunderland secured the FA Women's National Premier League title with two games to spare, following their victory over Millwall Lionesses on 3 April 2011. They defended the title two further times in 2012 and 2013. In 2013 they were formally integrated into the Sunderland AFC structure.

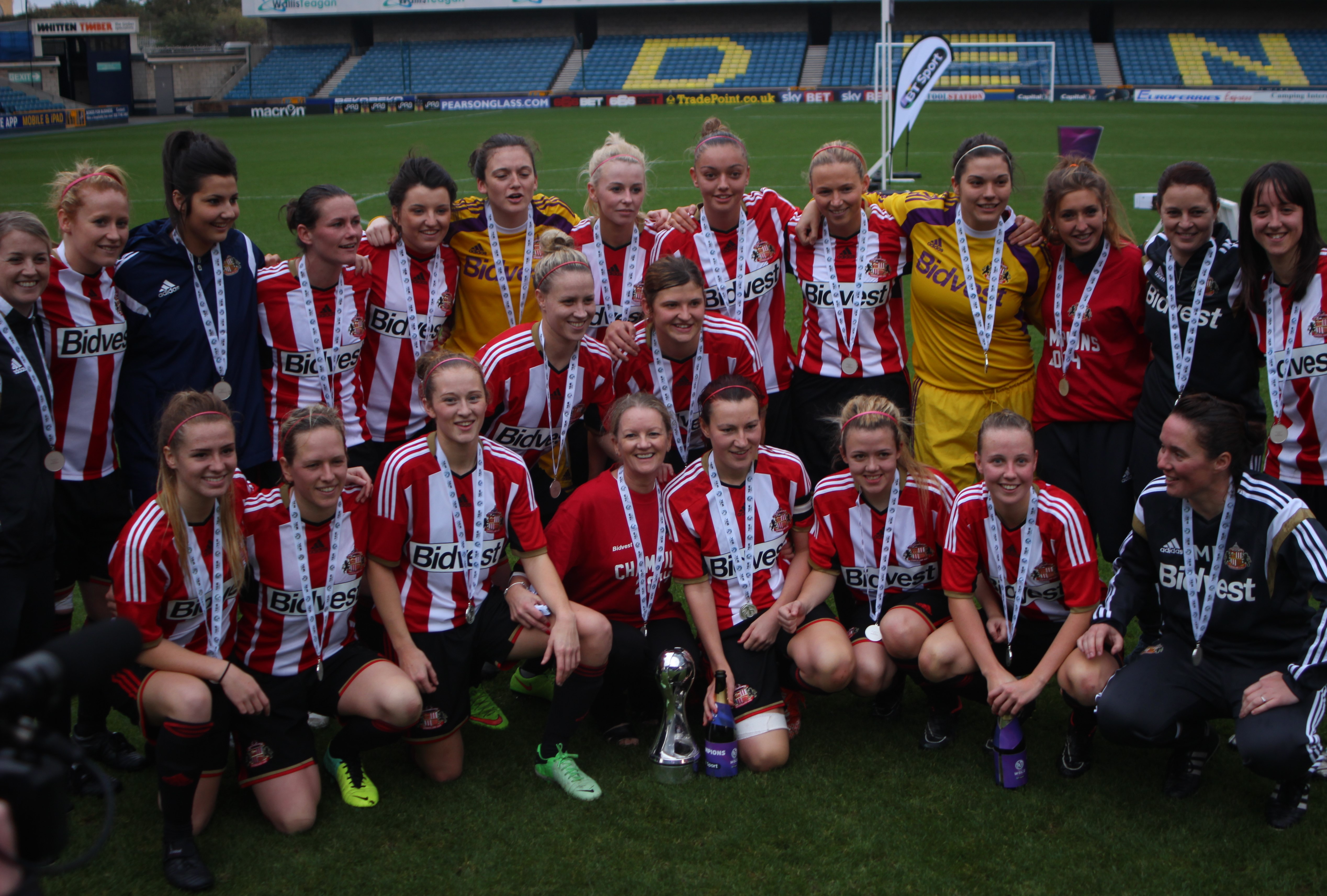
Sunderland AFC Ladies celebrating after becoming the 2014 champions of the WSL2.

In the 2014 season Sunderland entered the newly created FA WSL 2. On 26 October 2014, they were crowned inaugural champions of the FA WSL 2, beating Millwall Lionesses 4–0 on the final day of the season to finish two points ahead of Doncaster Belles. As a result, Sunderland returned to the top division, taking their place in the 2015 FA WSL 1. Manager Mick Mulhern, who won more silverware for the Sunderland Ladies than all other combined northern football teams (Men and Women), stepped down after 15 years for work-related commitments. He was replaced by former professional Carlton Fairweather.

On 5 January 2017, before the 2017 FA WSL Spring Series, the club announced they switch to part-time players only after three years of having a mix of part-time and full-time players. On 16 March 2017, Carlton Fairweather was replaced as head coach by his assistant Melanie Reay. Furthermore, Stephanie Bannon retired, leading to Lucy Staniforth replacing her as club captain. During the Spring Series, Reay guided the Lady Black Cats to a creditable 5th place finish with her new assistant and former player, Victoria Greenwell. Results in the Spring Series included victories against Yeovil Town and Bristol City WFC and draws against Arsenal W.F.C. and Reading F.C. Women.

After the Spring Series, Sunderland A.F.C. Ladies moved from their home venue at the Eppleton Colliery Welfare Ground to Mariners Park home of South Shields FC. Prior to the start of the 2018–19 season, the team was demoted two divisions from the WSL1 to the FA Women’s National League – Northern Premier Division after a bid to join the FA Women’s Championship was rejected. After a season at Mariners Park, the Lady Black Cats decided to return to their Hetton-le-Hole home, for their debut season in the FA Women's National League North.

=== 2020–present ===
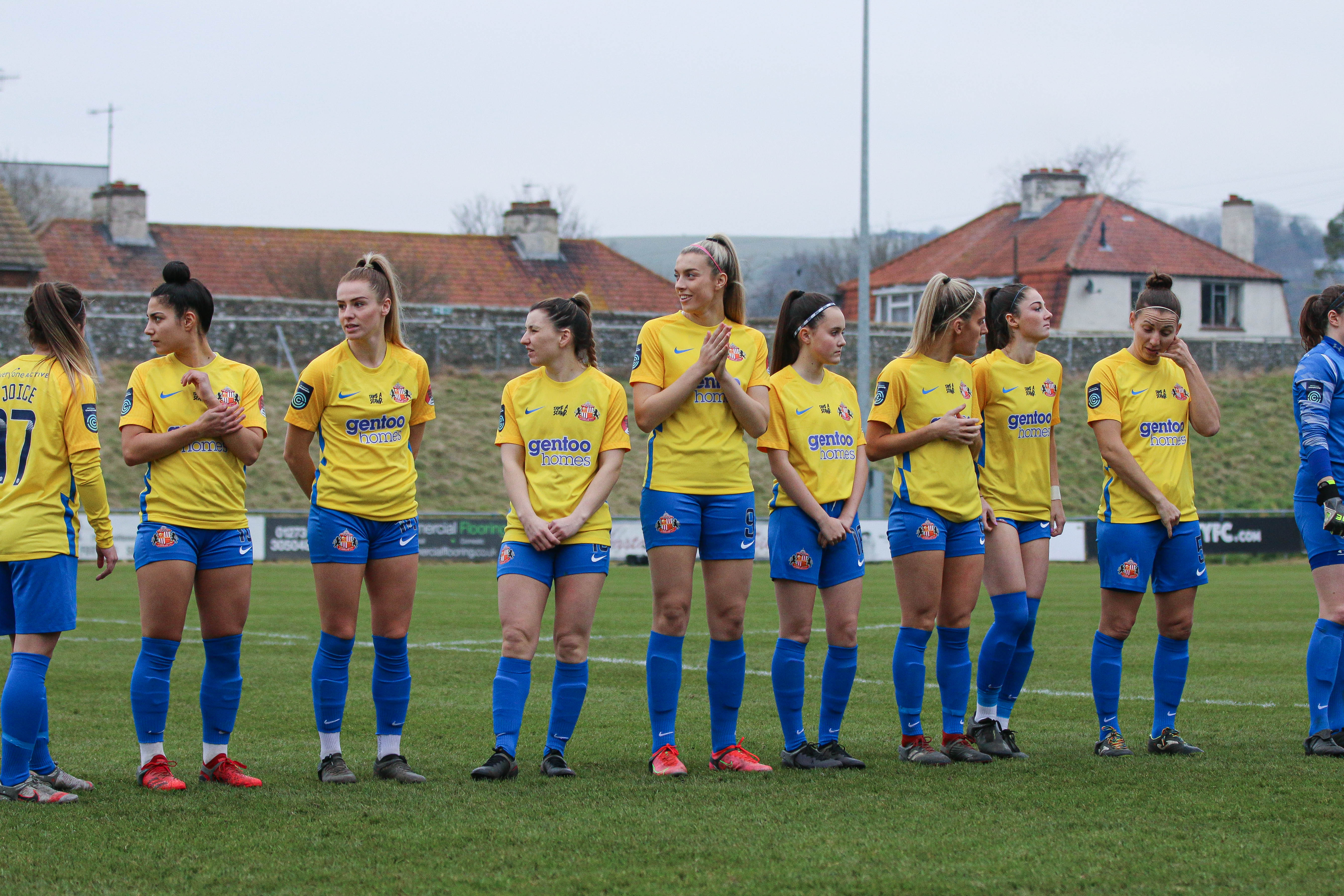
Sunderland A.F.C. Women players before the start of a match against Lewes F.C. Women in January 2022.

On 8 May 2021, the team applied to join the FA Women's Championship from the Northern Premier Division. On 2 June 2021, the club announced the FA had accepted this application, resulting in their move into the Women's Championship in the following 2021–22 season. Prior to the start of the 2022–23 season, the team officially changed its name from Sunderland Ladies to Sunderland Association Football Club Women in order to maintain "a contemporary, inclusive outlook as the club further develops into its new era in the women's game".

Before the start of the 2023–24 season, the team moved back to a hybrid model, signing several new players on full-time professional contracts. These signings included Mary McAteer, Katie Kitching, Natasha Fenton, Jenna Dear, Amy Goddard, and Ellen Jones. Despite the simultaneous departure of key players including Neve Herron and Emma Kelly, the team were unbeaten in their first nine league games of the 2023–24 season. They were top of the table for a considerable portion of the season and were in title contention throughout. The team ended the season in third place, a vast improvement from the second-bottom finish in the previous season and their best performance since their two-tier demotion from the WSL in 2018. On 13 October 2024, the team set a new attendance record of 15,387 for the Women's Championship as they were defeated in the Wear–Tyne derby at the Stadium of Light. The previous record had been an attendance of 11,137, set in 2022.

In November 2025, Bloomberg News reported that Sunderland co-owners Kyril Louis-Dreyfus and Juan Sartori were actively seeking investors to buy a stake in the women's team. Later reporting in February and March 2026 indicated that the club were in talks with Bay Collective, a multi-club ownership group operated by Sixth Street Partners, to buy a majority stake.

On 7 April 2026, shortly before the end of their 2025–26 season, the club announced they had sold a majority stake to Bay Collective, following a year-long search for investment. Bay Collective chief executive, former FA director Kay Cossington, said they would honour the team's legacy while investing in advanced infrastructure and training models to create sustained, long-term success for the club. Bay Collective's stake was reported to be approx. 80%, with the Sunderland A.F.C. parent club retaining ownership of the remainder of the team's shares.

On 18 June 2026, the club and Bay Collective released a statement confirming the takeover had been approved by WSL Football and completed. They said the fan experience and team environment would be developed, with Cossington adding there was a desire to see the club compete "with the very best in the world" in the future. Sunderland CEO Tom Burwell stated the sale was motivated by a desire to gain the "level of expertise" in women's football required for the team to compete "at the highest level". Cossington emphasised the desire to grow the club sustainably.

== Past seasons ==
As of March 2026, the team has the following record in its past seasons:

Key

Key to league record:

- P = Played
- W = Games won
- D = Games drawn
- L = Games lost
- F = Goals for
- A = Goals against
- Pts = Points
- Pos = Final position

Key to divisions:

- WSL1 = FA Women's Super League 1
- WSL2 = FA Women's Super League 2
- WPLN = FA Women's Premier League National Division
- WPLR = FA Women's Premier League Northern Division
- WC = The Women's Championship
  **bold** indicates change in division tier

Key to rounds:

- QR = Qualifying round
- Grp = Group stage
- Lge = League stage
- R1 = Round 1
- R2 = Round 2
- R3 = Round 3
- R4 = Round 4
- R5 = Round 5

Key to rounds:

- QF = Quarter-finals
- SF = Semi-finals
- RU = Runners-up
- W = Winners
- n/a = Not applicable
- DNE = Did not enter
- Disq = Disqualified

Champions	Runners-up	Promoted	Relegated

Season	League									FA Women's League Cup	Women's FA Cup	FA Women's National League Cup	Top league goalscorer	
Season	Division (tier)	P	W	D	L	F	A	Pts	Pos	FA Women's League Cup	Women's FA Cup	FA Women's National League Cup	Name	Goals
2003–04	WPLR (2)	20	10	7	3	56	31	37	2nd	n/a	R4	R2	Melanie Reay	18
2004–05	WPLR (2)	22	17	2	3	66	26	53	1st	n/a	QF	R1	Stephanie Houghton, Melanie Reay	16
2005–06	**WPLN (1)**	18	3	4	11	22	57	13	9th	n/a	R4	QF	Donna Lanaghan	6
2006–07	WPLN (1)	22	3	2	17	15	72	11	11th	n/a	R4	R1	Stephanie Houghton	7
2007–08	**WPLR (2)**	22	16	2	4	52	30	50	3rd	n/a	R4	QF	Sarah Danby	14
2008–09	WPLR (2)	22	17	2	3	95	16	53	1st	n/a	RU	QF	Sophie Williams	11
2009–10	**WPLN (1)**	22	12	1	9	36	35	37	5th	n/a	R4	SF	Kelly McDougall	7
2010–11	**WPLN^{[A]} (2)**	14	9	3	2	30	16	30	1st	n/a	QF	QF	Demilee Stokes	7
2011–12	WPLN (2)	18	13	3	2	49	18	42	1st	n/a	QF	W	Beth Mead	18
2012–13	WPLN (2)	18	14	3	1	54	16	45	1st	n/a	QF	SF	Beth Mead	17
2014	WSL2^{[B]} (2)	18	15	2	1	47	15	47	1st	Grp	R5	n/a	Beth Mead	13
2015	**WSL1 (1)**	14	6	2	6	24	24	20	4th	Grp	R3	n/a	Beth Mead	12
2016	WSL1 (1)	16	2	4	10	17	41	10	7th	R1	SF	n/a	Beth Mead	5
2017 Spring Series	WSL1 (1)	8	2	3	3	4	14	9	5th	n/a	QF	n/a	Beverly Leon	2
2017–18	WSL1 (1)	18	5	1	12	15	20	16	7th*	QF	QF	n/a	Lucy Staniforth, Keira Ramshaw, Bridget Galloway	3
2018–19	**WNL North (3)**	24	15	3	6	83	36	48	2nd	n/a	R2	R3	Keira Ramshaw	24
2019–20	WNL North (3)	14	13	1	0	53	10	40	1st**	n/a	R5	Final***	Bridget Galloway	21
2020–21	WNL North (3)	9	5	0	4	17	17	15	5th****	n/a	R3	n/a	Keira Ramshaw	5
2021–22	**WC (2)**	22	6	6	10	23	32	24	9th	Grp	R4	n/a	Keira Ramshaw, Neve Herron, Emily Scarr	4
2022–23	WC (2)	22	5	3	14	26	38	18	11th	Grp	R4	n/a	Emily Scarr	8
2023–24	WC (2)	22	12	5	5	31	18	41	3rd	QF	R4	n/a	Emily Scarr	7
2024–25	WC (2)	20	9	4	8	30	34	30	7th	Grp	QF	n/a	Eleanor Dale	8
2025–26	WSL2 (2)	22	6	6	10	28	35	24	8th	Grp	R4	n/a	Emily Scarr, Katie Kitching	6
2026–27	WSL2 (2)	5	4	1	0	11	4	13	2nd	Lge	R3	n/a	Elise Hughes	4

- Demoted to FA Women's National League (Tier 3) after not being awarded Tier 1 or 2 licence
- On 5 June 2020, the season was curtailed and all results were expunged with no promotion or relegation as a result of the COVID-19 pandemic.
- Final cancelled due to the COVID-19 pandemic
- Promoted to FA Women's Championship (Tier 2) after successfully applying via The Football Association's Upward Club Movement process within the Women’s Football Pyramid

== Current squad ==
As of 29 October 2026

Note: Flags indicate national team as defined under FIFA eligibility rules; some limited exceptions apply. Players may hold more than one non-FIFA nationality.

No.	Pos.	Nation	Player
1	GK	ENG	Fran Stenson
2	DF	ENG	Ria Bose (on loan from West Ham United)
3	DF	ENG	Mary Corbyn
5	DF	WAL	Rhiannon Roberts (captain)
6	DF	WAL	Tara Bourne
7	FW	ENG	Katy Watson
8	FW	ENG	Emily Scarr
9	FW	WAL	Elise Hughes
10	MF	NZL	Katie Kitching
11	DF	ENG	Jessica Brown
12	MF	NIR	Emily Cassap
14	MF	ENG	Natasha Fenton

No.	Pos.	Nation	Player
16	FW	FIN	Sanni Franssi (on loan from London City Lionesses)
17	FW	IRL	Izzy Atkinson
18	GK	USA	Noa Schumacher
19	FW	ENG	Lily Dent (on loan from Brighton & Hove Albion)
20	MF	JAM	Atlanta Primus
21	MF	IRL	Marissa Sheva
23	MF	BEL	Kassandra Missipo
27	DF	SCO	Brianna Westrup
31	DF	ENG	Chloe Paxton
36	GK	ENG	Jenny Blench
77	DF	FRA	Tess Laplacette

=== Out on loan ===
Note: Flags indicate national team as defined under FIFA eligibility rules; some limited exceptions apply. Players may hold more than one non-FIFA nationality.

No.	Pos.	Nation	Player
30	DF	SCO	Ella West (at Loughborough Lightning until 30 June 2027)
32	FW	ENG	Niyah Dunbar (at Norwich City until 30 June 2027)
34	FW	NIR	Niamh Boothroyd (at Middlesbrough until 30 June 2027)

=== Former players ===
For details of current and former players, see Category:Sunderland A.F.C. Women players.

== Club officials ==
As of 04 November 2026

Board of directors

- Kay Cossington
- Cole Greenberg
- Yulia Levin
- Russell Wolff
- Wendy Yang

Executive team

- Chief Executive Officer: James Gray
- Technical Director: Rehanne Skinner

Football operations

- Head of Football Operations: Alex Clark
- Academy Manager: Tom Gallagher

Coaching team

- Head coach: Melanie Reay
- Assistant head coach: Steph Libbey
- Goalkeeping Coach: Dylan Malpas
- Physical Performance Coach: Lorena Sumser
- Professional Game Academy U21 Head Coach: Courtney Lock

== Honours ==
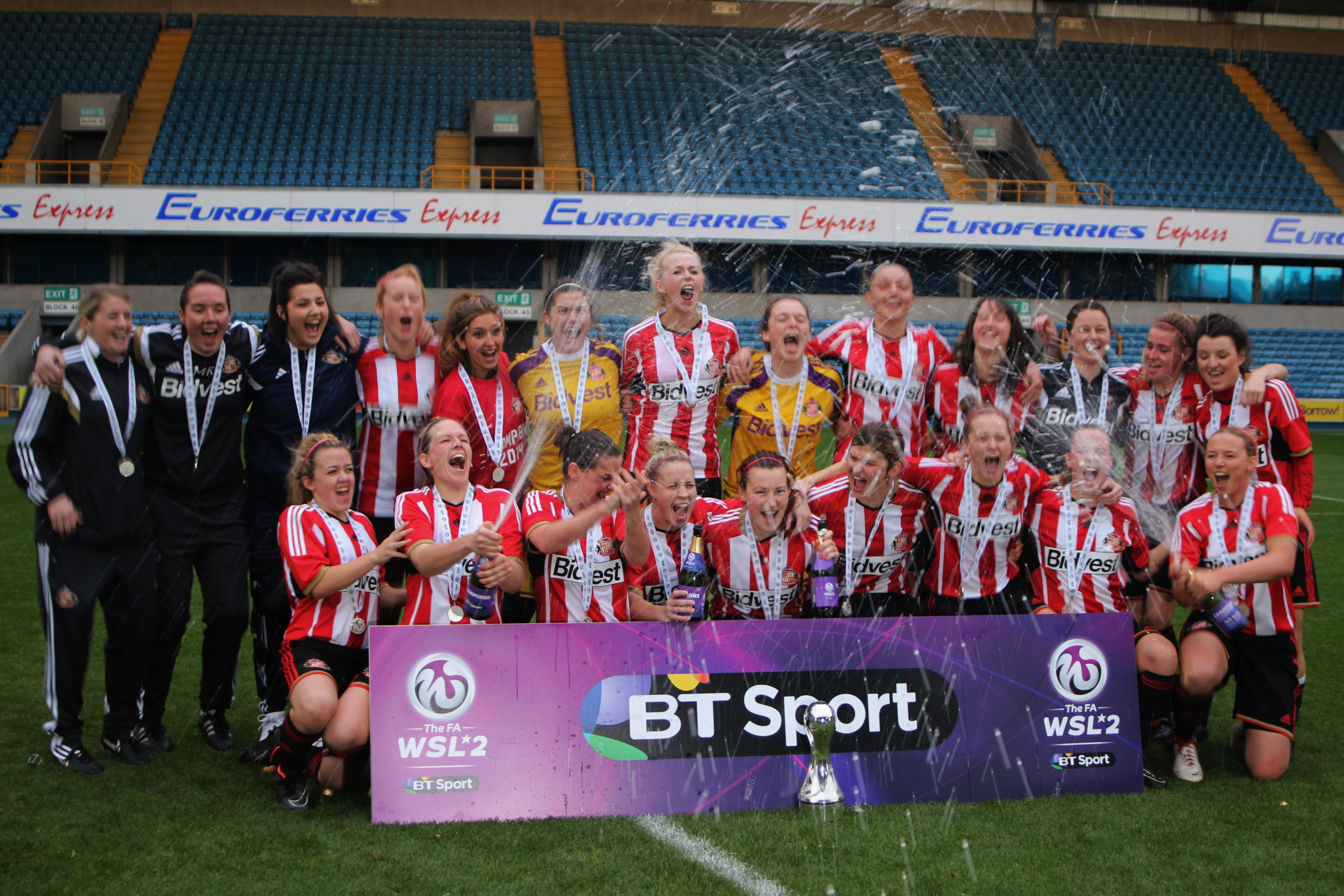
With the WSL 2 trophy in 2014

League

- FA Women's Premier League National Division
  - Champions: 2010–11, 2011–12, 2012–13
- FA WSL 2
  - Champions: 2014
- FA Women's Premier League Northern Division
  - Champions: 1999–2000 (as Blyth Spartans Kestrels), 2004–05, 2008–09

Cup

- FA Women's Cup
  - Runners-up: 2008–09
- FA Women's Premier League Cup
  - Winners: 2011–12

== Footnotes ==
A. The FA Women's Super League was formed in 2010 for the start of the 2011 season, Sunderland Ladies were not chosen to participate in the newly formed top tier of women's football. Although Sunderland Ladies were not relegated from the top tier of Women's football in England in 2010, they found themselves playing in the second tier at the start of their 2011 campaign.
B. The FA Women's Super League was expanded to two divisions in 2014 for the start of that years season with the formation of the FA Women's Super League 2. Sunderland Ladies were one of 10 teams elected to participate in the newly formed second tier of women's football for the start of the 2014 season.

== See also ==
- Durham W.F.C.
- Leeds United Women F.C.
- Middlesbrough F.C. Women
- Newcastle United W.F.C.
