= 2015 Doncaster Rovers Belles L.F.C. season =

Doncaster Rovers Belles
2015 season
- Chairman: Teresa Aitken
- Manager: Glen Harris
- Stadium: Keepmoat Stadium
- WSL 2: 2nd (promoted)
- FA Cup: Fifth Round
- WSL Cup: Group stage
Home colours	Away colours

The 2015 season was Doncaster Rovers Belles' fifth season in the FA WSL, and their second season in the second tier of English women's football.

After the Belles narrowly missed out on promotion in the previous season, Gordon Staniforth resigned on 30 October 2014. Former Lincoln Ladies manager Glen Harris was appointed on December 8, 2014, beating competition from all over Europe; including Belgium, Croatia, Italy and the UK.

This season also saw the introduction of a new club crest, combining the old-style Doncaster Belles badge, with the more recently used Doncaster Rovers badge.

== Squad ==
Note: Flags indicate national team as defined under FIFA eligibility rules; some limited exceptions apply. Players may hold more than one non-FIFA nationality.

No.	Pos.	Nation	Player
1	GK	ENG	Nicola Hobbs
2	DF	ENG	Lyndsey Cunningham
3	DF	ENG	Samantha Tierney
4	DF	ENG	Leandra Little (Captain)
5	DF	ENG	Rhiannon Roberts
6	MF	ENG	Kasia Lipka
7	DF	ENG	Molly Johnson
8	MF	ENG	Sue Smith
9	FW	ENG	Courtney Sweetman-Kirk
10	MF	ENG	Emily Roberts (on loan from Notts County)
11	MF	ENG	Bethany England

No.	Pos.	Nation	Player
12	MF	ENG	Reanne Thomas
13	MF	ENG	Sophie Stamp
16	MF	ENG	Ashleigh Mills
17	FW	ENG	Nicole Dale
18	MF	ENG	Sophie Barker
22	GK	ENG	Danielle Hill
23	DF	ENG	Lauren Cresswell
24	MF	ENG	Hope Knight
—	GK	ENG	Megan Govier
—	FW	ENG	Jody Handley

== Transfers ==
=== In ===
No.	Pos.	Name	Country	Transfer From	Date	Source
18	MF	Sophie Barker	ENG	Sheffield	13 January 2015	
10	MF	Emily Roberts	ENG	Notts County (loan)	26 January 2015	
—	FW	Jody Handley	ENG	Everton	28 January 2015	
22	GK	Danielle Hill	ENG	Durham	29 January 2015	

=== Out ===
No.	Pos.	Name	Country	Transfer To	Date	Source
10	MF	Millie Bright	ENG	Chelsea	27 November 2014	
5	FW	Jessica Sigsworth	ENG	Notts County	6 January 2015	
15	DF	Victoria Williams	ENG	Sunderland	February 2015	
14	FW	Lucy Sowerby	ENG	Bradford City	March 2015	
—	FW	Jody Handley	ENG	Retired	6 May 2015	

== Statistics ==
As of 12 June 2015

No.	Pos	Nat	Player	Total		WSL 2		FA Cup		WSL Cup	
No.	Pos	Nat	Player	Apps	Goals	Apps	Goals	Apps	Goals	Apps	Goals
1	GK	(England) ENG	Nicola Hobbs	11	0	9	0	2	0	0	0
2	DF	(England) ENG	Lyndsey Cunningham	9	0	7	0	2	0	0	0
3	DF	(England) ENG	Samantha Tierney	4	0	0+4	0	0	0	0	0
4	DF	(England) ENG	Leandra Little	11	1	9	1	2	0	0	0
5	DF	(England) ENG	Rhiannon Roberts	11	1	9	1	2	0	0	0
6	MF	(England) ENG	Kasia Lipka	11	0	9	0	2	0	0	0
7	DF	(England) ENG	Molly Johnson	4	0	1+2	0	0+1	0	0	0
8	MF	(England) ENG	Sue Smith	11	7	9	5	2	2	0	0
9	FW	(England) ENG	Courtney Sweetman-Kirk	11	9	9	7	2	2	0	0
10	MF	(England) ENG	Emily Roberts (on loan from Notts County)	9	4	8	4	1	0	0	0
11	MF	(England) ENG	Bethany England	10	5	8	4	2	1	0	0
12	MF	(England) ENG	Reanne Thomas	7	0	1+5	0	0+1	0	0	0
13	MF	(England) ENG	Sophie Stamp	5	0	0+5	0	0	0	0	0
14	FW	(England) ENG	Lucy Sowerby	0	0	0	0	0	0	0	0
16	MF	(England) ENG	Ashleigh Mills	2	0	1	0	0+1	0	0	0
17	FW	(England) ENG	Nicole Dale	2	0	0+2	0	0	0	0	0
18	MF	(England) ENG	Sophie Barker	11	1	9	1	2	0	0	0
22	GK	(England) ENG	Danielle Hill	0	0	0	0	0	0	0	0
23	DF	(England) ENG	Lauren Cresswell	9	0	4+3	0	2	0	0	0
24	MF	(England) ENG	Hope Knight	8	0	5+2	0	1	0	0	0
–	GK	(England) ENG	Megan Govier	0	0	0	0	0	0	0	0
–	FW	(England) ENG	Jody Handley	0	0	0	0	0	0	0	0
Players who left the club during the season:

=== Goals record ===
As of 12 June 2015

Rank	No.	Po.	Name	WSL 2	FA Cup	WSL Cup	Total
1	9	FW	Courtney Sweetman-Kirk	7	2	0	9
2	8	MF	Sue Smith	5	2	0	7
3	11	MF	Bethany England	4	1	0	5
4	10	MF	Emily Roberts	4	0	0	4
5	18	MF	Sophie Barker	1	0	0	1
5	4	DF	Leandra Little	1	0	0	1
5	5	DF	Rhiannon Roberts	1	0	0	1
Own Goals				0	0	0	0
Total				23	5	0	28

== Matches ==
=== Pre-season friendlies ===
On 15 January 2015 Arsenal Ladies announced that they would play a friendly against the Belles, in a clash of two former heavyweights. On 28 January, Liverpool Ladies became the second club to announce a friendly against Doncaster.

15 February 2015 Friendly	Arsenal Ladies	4–1	Doncaster Rovers Belles	Hatfield
14:00 GMT	Nobbs 53', 80'; Sanderson 64'; Sampson 83'	Report	Barker 60'	Stadium: Hertfordshire Sports Village

14 March 2015 Friendly	Liverpool Ladies	v	Doncaster Rovers Belles	Widnes
19:00 GMT				Stadium: Halton Stadium

=== FA Cup ===
On 12 January 2015 the draw for the Third Round Proper of the FA Women's Cup was made. The Belles were drawn at home to London Bees, with the match to be played on 1 February 2015. This fixture was then rearranged to be played a day earlier on 31 January. In the Fourth Round, Doncaster were drawn away to either Bradford City Women or FC Reedswood, depending on who won the postponed tie. The postponed match was won by Bradford, with the Fourth Round tie to be played on 8 March.

31 January 2015 Third Round	Doncaster Rovers Belles	3–0	London Bees	Doncaster
18:30 GMT	England 53'; Sweetman-Kirk 62'; Smith 79'	Report		Stadium: Keepmoat Stadium

8 March 2015 Fourth Round	Bradford City Women	1–2	Doncaster Rovers Belles	Bradford
14:00 GMT				Stadium: Dennyfield

22 March 2015 Fifth Round	Manchester City	3–1	Doncaster Rovers Belles

=== FA WSL Cup ===
Rovers were drawn in Group 2. They play 5 matches in the group.

Group Stage	Doncaster Rovers Belles	0–3	Manchester City

30 July 2015 Group Stage	Doncaster Rovers Belles	v	Liverpool

16 August 2015 Group Stage	Everton	v	Doncaster Rovers Belles

27 August 2015 Group Stage	Doncaster Rovers Belles	v	Durham

30 August 2015 Group Stage	Sunderland	v	Doncaster Rovers Belles

=== FA WSL 2 ===
On 26 January 2015, the fixtures for the coming season's WSL were released, with the Belles starting their fixtures at home to Durham Women.

19 March 2015 1	Doncaster Rovers Belles	3-0	Durham Women	Doncaster
19:45 GMT				Stadium: Keepmoat Stadium

28 March 2015 2	Doncaster Rovers Belles	2-1	Yeovil Town Ladies	Doncaster
18:30 GMT				Stadium: Keepmoat Stadium

5 April 2015 3	Aston Villa Ladies	0-5	Doncaster Rovers Belles	Sutton Coldfield
14:00 BST				Stadium: Sutton Coldfield Central Ground

18 April 2015 4	Everton Ladies	1-1	Doncaster Rovers Belles	Widnes
18:30 BST				Stadium: Halton Stadium

25 April 2015 5	Doncaster Rovers Belles	2-1	Aston Villa Ladies	Doncaster
18:30 BST				Stadium: Keepmoat Stadium

9 May 2015 6	Doncaster Rovers Belles	5-1	London Bees	Doncaster
18:30 BST				Stadium: Keepmoat Stadium

16 May 2015 7	Doncaster Rovers Belles	0-3	Reading Women	Doncaster
18:30 BST				Stadium: Keepmoat Stadium

21 May 2015 8	Durham Women	0-2	Doncaster Rovers Belles	Durham
19:30 BST				Stadium: New Ferens Park

31 May 2015 9	Yeovil Town Ladies	0-3	Doncaster Rovers Belles	Sherborne
14:00 BST				Stadium: Raleigh Grove

11 July 2015 10	Doncaster Rovers Belles	5-0	Watford Ladies	Doncaster
18:30 BST				Stadium: Keepmoat Stadium

19 July 2015 11	Oxford United Women	2-5	Doncaster Rovers Belles	Abingdon-on-Thames
14:00 BST				Stadium: Northcourt Road

26 July 2015 12	Doncaster Rovers Belles	v	Everton Ladies	Doncaster
14:00 BST				Stadium: Keepmoat Stadium

9 August 2015 13	Watford Ladies	v	Doncaster Rovers Belles	Berkhamsted
14:00 BST				Stadium: Broadwater

23 August 2015 14	Millwall Lionesses	v	Doncaster Rovers Belles	London
14:00 BST				Stadium: The Den

5 September 2015 15	Reading Women	v	Doncaster Rovers Belles	Farnborough
18:00 BST				Stadium: Cherrywood Road

27 September 2015 16	London Bees	v	Doncaster Rovers Belles	London
14:00 BST				Stadium: The Hive Stadium

3 October 2015 17	Doncaster Rovers Belles	v	Oxford United Women	Doncaster
18:30 BST				Stadium: Keepmoat Stadium

18 October 2015 18	Doncaster Rovers Belles	v	Millwall Lionesses	Doncaster
14:00 BST				Stadium: Keepmoat Stadium
