= 2024–25 Sunderland A.F.C. Women season =

English football club season

Sunderland Women
2024–25 season
- Chairman: Kyril Louis-Dreyfus
- Head coach: Melanie Reay
- Stadium: Eppleton Colliery Welfare Ground
- Women's Championship: 7th
- FA Cup: Quarter-finals
- League Cup: Group Stage
- Top goalscorer: League: Eleanor Dale (8); All: Eleanor Dale (13)
- Highest home attendance: 15,387 vs Newcastle United (Women's Championship)
- Lowest home attendance: 400 vs Charlton Athletic (Women's Championship); 229 vs Huddersfield Town (FA Cup)
- Average home league attendance: 2,426
- Biggest win: 7-1 vs Exeter City (Women's FA Cup)
- Biggest defeat: 0–5 vs Birmingham City (Women's Championship)
Home colours	Away colours	Third colours

The 2024–25 season was the 35th season in the history of Sunderland A.F.C. Women and their fourth consecutive season in the Women's Championship. The club participated in the Women's Championship, the Women's FA Cup, and the Women's League Cup.

Despite Sunderland starting the season slowly with only 4 points from their first 5 games, a run of 5 wins and 2 draws from their next 7 put the "Lasses" in contention at the top of the table. However, a slump in form over the final 8 games saw them finish mid-table in 7th.

Sunderland would go on to make the Quarter-finals of the Women's FA Cup for the first time since 2017-18, eventually losing to Manchester United.

The 2024–25 season saw the league return of the Women's Tyne-Wear derby for the first time since the 2008-09 season. The game at the Stadium of Light set a new record crowd for a women's second-tier match with 15,387 in attendance. This record was broken again in the reverse fixture with 38,502 fans in attendance at St James' Park.

== Transfers ==
=== In ===
Date	Pos.	Player	From	Ref.
3 July 2024	GK	(England) Demi Lambourne	(England) Crystal Palace	
4 July 2024	ST	(England) Eleanor Dale	(England) Everton	
31 October 2024	CB	(England) Grace McCatty	Unattached (Retired)	
26 March 2025	CM	(Republic of Ireland) Marissa Sheva	(United States) Portland Thorns FC	

=== Out ===
Date	Pos.	Player	To	Ref.
11 June 2024	CM	(England) Mollie Rouse	(United States) Spokane Zephyr	
1 July 2024	GK	(England) Claudia Moan	(England) Newcastle United	

=== Loaned in ===
Date	Pos.	Player	From	Date until	Ref.
26 July 2024	CM	(England) Keira Flannery	(England) West Ham United	End of Season	
1 August 2024	DM	(Republic of Ireland) Jessie Stapleton	(England) West Ham United	End of Season	

=== Retired / Out of Contract ===
Date	Pos.	Player	Subsequent club	Join date	Ref.
1 July 2024	FW	(Kosovo) Elizabeta Ejupi	Retired		
1 July 2024	CB	(England) Grace McCatty	(England) Sunderland	31 October 2024	
1 July 2024	LB	(England) Faye Mullen	Retired		

== Pre-season and friendlies ==
On 18 July 2024, Sunderland announced their first slate of pre-season fixtures, against Rangers, Hearts, Sheffield United and Blackburn Rovers. A game against Leicester City was later added to this schedule. On 7 August 2024, a further friendly against Everton was confirmed.

Win Draw Loss Fixtures

28 July 2024 Friendly	Sunderland	1-2	Rangers	Cleadon
14:00 BST	Corbyn (?)	Report	Arnot (?); Hill (?)	Stadium: Academy of Light; Attendance: 0 (Behind-closed-doors)

4 August 2024 Friendly	Hearts	?-?	Sunderland	Edinburgh
Note: While this fixture was announced on 18 July 2024, no details of the match were shared by either club. It is unclear whether this match went ahead.

11 August 2024 Friendly	Sunderland	?-?	Sheffield United	Cleadon
				Stadium: Academy of Light; Attendance: 0 (Behind-closed-doors)
Note: While this fixture was announced on 18 July 2024, no details of the match were shared by either club. It is unclear whether this match went ahead.

15 August 2024 Friendly	Leicester City	3–1	Sunderland	Leicester
	Rantala; Mouchon; Momiki	Report	(pen.)	Stadium: Belvoir Drive; Attendance: 0 (Behind-closed-doors)

18 August 2024 Friendly	Sunderland	?-?	Blackburn Rovers	Cleadon
				Stadium: Academy of Light; Attendance: 0 (Behind-closed-doors)
Note: While this fixture was announced on 18 July 2024, no details of the match were shared by either club. It is unclear whether this match went ahead.

25 August 2024 Friendly	Everton	1–2	Sunderland	Halewood
	Gabarro 20'	Report	Kitching 61'; Westrup 63'	Stadium: Finch Farm; Attendance: 0 (Behind-closed-doors)

== Competitions ==
=== Overall record ===
Competition	First match	Last match	Starting round	Final position	Record							
Competition	First match	Last match	Starting round	Final position	Pld	W	D	L	GF	GA	GD	Win %
Women's Championship	8 September 2024	4 May 2025	Matchday 1	7th	20	9	3	8	30	34	−4	45.00
FA Cup	8 December 2024	8 March 2025	Third round	Quarter-finals	4	3	0	1	14	4	+10	75.00
League Cup	3 October 2024	11 December 2024	Group stage	Group Stage	3	1	0	2	4	6	−2	33.33
Total					27	13	3	11	48	44	+4	48.15

Last updated: 4 May 2025
Source: Competitions

=== Women's Championship ===
==== League table ====
Pos	Team	Pld	W	D	L	GF	GA	GD	Pts
5	Newcastle United	20	9	7	4	38	24	+14	34
6	Bristol City	20	8	6	6	34	24	+10	30
7	Sunderland	20	9	3	8	30	34	−4	30
8	Southampton	20	5	6	9	22	25	−3	21
9	Portsmouth	20	3	4	13	16	48	−32	13

Source: https://www.bbc.co.uk/sport/football/womens-super-league-two/table
Rules for classification: 1) Points; 2) Goal difference; 3) Number of goals scored

==== Results summary ====
Overall								Home						Away					
Pld	W	D	L	GF	GA	GD	Pts	W	D	L	GF	GA	GD	W	D	L	GF	GA	GD
20	9	3	8	30	34	−4	30	5	1	4	17	17	0	4	2	4	13	17	−4

==== Results by matchday ====
Matchday	1	2	3	4	5	6	7	8	9	10	11	12	13	14	15	16	17	18	19	20
Result	L	L	W	D	L	W	W	W	W	D	W	D	L	L	W	L	L	L	W	W
Position	11	11	8	8	8	8	8	8	5	5	4	3	6	6	6	6	7	7	7	7
Points	0	0	3	4	4	7	10	13	16	17	20	21	21	21	24	24	24	24	27	30

W = Win; D = Draw; L = Loss

==== Matches ====
8 September 2024 1	Birmingham City	5-0	Sunderland	Bordesley
14:00 BST	Quinn 10', 53' (pen.); Agg 32'; Choe 39'; Fuso 65'; Mason (yellow card) 85'	Report	Lambourne (yellow card) 52'; McAteer (yellow card) 70'; Goddard (yellow card) 90+2'	Stadium: St Andrew's Stadium; Attendance: 1,284; Referee: Cheryl Foster

15 September 2024 2	Sunderland	0–3	Southampton	Hetton-le-Hole
14:00 BST	Dale (penalty missed) 36'; Fenton (yellow card) 57'; Dale (yellow card) 76'; Stapleton (yellow card) 80'	Report	Dean 73', 84'; Gregory (yellow card) 85'; Pike 90+4'	Stadium: Eppleton CW; Attendance: 582; Referee: Adewunmi Soneye

29 September 2024 3	Sunderland	1-0	London City	Hetton-le-Hole
14:00 BST	Stapleton (yellow card) 9'; Fenton 58'	Report	Fitzgerald (yellow card) 81'	Stadium: Eppleton CW; Attendance: 565; Referee: Grace Lowe

6 October 2024 4	Charlton Athletic	3-3	Sunderland	Charlton
14:00 BST	Barton 31'; Filis (yellow card) 66'; N'Dow (yellow card) 71'; Primus (yellow card) 77'; Muya 81', 85'	Report	Kitching 8'; Stapleton 24', (yellow card) 36'; Dear (yellow card) 26', (goal) 78'; Brown (yellow card) 65'; Lambourne (yellow card) 85'; Fenton (yellow card) 90+1'	Stadium: The Valley; Attendance: 534; Referee: Abby Dearden

13 October 2024 5	Sunderland	1–2	Newcastle United	Sunderland
14:00 BST	Watt 78' (o.g.); Brown (yellow card) 90+4'	Report	Lumsden 28', 49'; Stobbs (yellow card) 80'; Boddy (yellow card) 90+5'	Stadium: Stadium of Light; Attendance: 15,387; Referee: Phoebe Cross

20 October 2024 6	Durham	1-2	Sunderland	Durham
12:00 BST	Blake 10'; Wilson (yellow card) 58'; Ryan-Doyle (yellow card) 90+2'	Report	Fenton (yellow card) 24'; Dale 34' (pen.); McAteer 51'; Stapleton (yellow card) 57'; Ede (yellow card) 68'; McInnes (yellow card) 87'	Stadium: Maiden Castle; Attendance: 1,039; Referee: Jane Simms

3 November 2024 7	Sunderland	4–3	Bristol City	Hetton-le-Hole
14:00 GMT	Dale 1', 49'; Kitching 50', 53'; Scarr (yellow card) 70'; Stapleton (yellow card) 78'; Dear (yellow card) 85'; Jones (yellow card) 90+4'	Report	Ward 10'; Morgan 29'; Lloyd-Smith 71'; Struck (yellow card) 88'	Stadium: Eppleton CW; Attendance: 498; Referee: Lucy May

10 November 2024 8	Sunderland	2-1	Blackburn Rovers	Hetton-le-Hole
14:00 GMT	Ede (yellow card) 23'; Kitching 28'; Dear (yellow card) 45'; Goddard (yellow card) 61'; Dale 73'	Report	Crompton (yellow card) 30'; Dugdale (yellow card) 38'; Taylor 45+2'	Stadium: Eppleton CW; Attendance: 487; Referee: Magdalena Golba

17 November 2024 9	Sheffield United	0-1	Sunderland	Sheffield
13:00 GMT		Report	Fenton (yellow card) 34'; Beer (yellow card) 54'; Dale 85'	Stadium: Bramall Lane; Attendance: 761; Referee: Levi Gray

15 December 2024 10	Sunderland	2-2	Portsmouth	Hetton-le-Hole
14:00 GMT	Dale 22'; Watson 45+1'; Fenton (yellow card) 84'; Dear (yellow card) 88'	Report	Quirk 17'; Dent 46'	Stadium: Eppleton CW; Attendance: 470; Referee: Aimee Keir

19 January 2025 11	Southampton	0-2	Sunderland	Southampton
14:00 GMT	Dennis (yellow card) 50'; Stenson (yellow card) 90+6'	Report	Dale 53'; Goddard (yellow card) 59'; Brown (yellow card) 64'; Kitching 74'	Stadium: St Mary's Stadium; Attendance: 7,012; Referee: Laura van Lier

25 January 2025 12	Blackburn Rovers	1-1	Sunderland	Blackburn
17:30 GMT	Toland (yellow card) 16'; Taylor 51'; Dahou (yellow card) 72'; Crompton (yellow card) 88'	Report	Stapleton 18'; McInnes (yellow card) 21'; Kitching (yellow card) 29'; Dale (yellow card) 45+3'; Fenton (yellow card) 75'	Stadium: Ewood Park; Attendance: 437; Referee: Callum Parke

2 February 2025 13	Sunderland	0-1	Birmingham City	Sunderland
14:00 GMT	Westrup (yellow card) 63'	Report	Lee 7'; Cooke (yellow card) 41'; Harrison-Murray (yellow card) 45+5'	Stadium: Stadium of Light; Attendance: 4,026; Referee: Megan Wilson

16 February 2025 14	London City	2-0	Sunderland	Bromley
14:00 GMT	Goodwin 14'; Campbell (yellow card) 18'; Asllani 30' (pen.); Imuran (yellow card) 81'	Report	Brown (yellow card) 65'	Stadium: Hayes Lane; Attendance: 1,055; Referee: Nicoleta Bria

2 March 2025 15	Sunderland	2-0	Durham	Sunderland
14:00 GMT	McInnes 30'; Goddard 47'; Stapleton (yellow card) 55'; Lambourne (yellow card) 56'; Westrup (yellow card) 66'; Fenton (yellow card) 86'	Report	Hepple (yellow card) 55'	Stadium: Stadium of Light; Attendance: 1,305; Referee: Joanne Horwood

16 March 2025 16	Portsmouth	2-1	Sunderland	Portsmouth
14:00 GMT	Rowbotham 52'; Hornby 56', (yellow card) 61'; Poulter (yellow card) 90+7'	Report	Watson 75'	Stadium: Fratton Park; Attendance: 2,461; Referee: Hannah Gardner

23 March 2025 17	Newcastle United	1-0	Sunderland	Newcastle upon Tyne
14:00 GMT	Hayles 77'	Report	Stapleton (yellow card) 17'	Stadium: St James' Park; Attendance: 38,502; Referee: Sophie Dennington

30 March 2025 18	Sunderland	3-4	Charlton Athletic	Hetton-le-Hole
14:00 BST	Fenton (yellow card) 46', (goal) 58'; McAteer 60'; Jones 89' (pen.)	Report	Brazil 11', 45+2'; Pearse (yellow card) 12'; Hutton 15', 22', (yellow card) 90+3'; N'Dow (yellow card) 57'; Whitehouse (yellow card) 79'; Bradley (yellow card) 90+2'	Stadium: Eppleton CW; Attendance: 400; Referee: Jacob Viera

27 April 2025 19	Bristol City	2-3	Sunderland	Bristol
14:00 BST	Lloyd-Smith 1', 69'	Report	Jones 44', 80'; Sheva (yellow card) 45+3'; Watson 90+5'	Stadium: Ashton Gate; Attendance: 2,892; Referee: Jade Wardle

4 May 2025 20	Sunderland	2-1	Sheffield United	Sunderland
14:00 BST	Dale 48' (pen.); Scarr 82'	Report	Robinson 90+3'	Stadium: Stadium of Light; Attendance: 541; Referee: Hannah Gardner

=== FA Cup ===
8 December 2024 Third round proper	Sunderland	4–0	Huddersfield Town	Hetton-le-Hole
14:00 GMT	McInnes 17'; McAteer 32'; Goddard 55'; Dale 87'	Report	Stuart (yellow card) 48'	Stadium: Eppleton CW; Attendance: 229; Referee: Charlotte Jacques-Smith

12 January 2025 Fourth round proper	Exeter City	1-7	Sunderland	Newton Abbot
13:00 GMT	Stacey 38' (pen.)	Report	Jones 4', 40', 49'; Dale 13', 31', 78', 85'	Stadium: Coach Road; Attendance: 588; Referee: Levi Gray

9 February 2025 Fifth round proper	Portsmouth	0-2	Sunderland	Havant
14:00 GMT	Williams (yellow card) 45+5' (yellow-red card) 89'; Hornby (yellow card) 63'	Report	Dear 34', (yellow card) 67'; Scarr 45+1'	Stadium: Westleigh Park; Attendance: 424; Referee: Alice Parker

8 March 2025 Quarter-final	Manchester United	3-1	Sunderland	Leigh
17:15 GMT	Galton 7', (yellow card) 61'; Le Tissier 45+2'; Toone 90+1'	Report	Fenton (yellow card) 61'; Griffiths 70'	Stadium: Leigh Sports Village; Attendance: 3,051; Referee: Stacey Fullicks

=== League Cup ===
==== Group stage ====
Pos	Team	Pld	W	WPEN	LPEN	L	GF	GA	GD	Pts	Qualification	DUR	BLB	SUN	SHU
1	Durham	3	2	1	0	0	5	3	+2	8	Advanced to knock-out stage	—	–	–	1–1
2	Blackburn Rovers	3	2	0	0	1	8	5	+3	6		1–2	—	–	4–2
3	Sunderland	3	1	0	0	2	4	6	−2	3		1–2	1–3	—	–
4	Sheffield United	3	0	0	1	2	4	7	−3	1		–	–	1–2	—

Updated to match(es) played on 3 October 2024. Source: Women's League Cup
Rules for classification: 1) Points; 2) Goal difference; 3) Number of goals scored; 4) Number of wins; 5) Head-to-head record

3 October 2024 Group stage	Sheffield United	1-2	Sunderland	Alfreton
19:00 BST	Farrugia 51'; Connolly-Jackson (yellow card) 63'	Report	Watson 2'; Bewicke (yellow card) 64'; Cassap 77'	Stadium: North Street; Attendance: 202; Referee: Lauren Whiteman

24 November 2024 Group stage	Sunderland	1-3	Blackburn Rovers	Hetton-le-Hole
14:00 GMT	Kitching 61'; Dale (yellow card) 90+5'	Report	Hack 16', (yellow card) 90+5'; Edwards 65', 90'; Dahou (yellow card) 86'; Dugdale (yellow card) 90+5'	Stadium: Eppleton CW; Attendance: 376; Referee: Lucy May

11 December 2024 Group stage	Sunderland	1-2	Durham	Hetton-le-Hole
19:30 GMT	Watson 6'; Jones (yellow card) 62'; Dear (yellow card) 74'; Stapleton (yellow card) 85' (yellow-red card) 90+2'; Brown (yellow card) 90+5'	Report	Ryan-Doyle 1'; Bradley (yellow card) 39'; Novak 58'	Stadium: Eppleton CW; Attendance: 450; Referee: Grace Lowe

== Statistics ==
Italics indicate a loaned in player.

=== Appearances ===
As of 4 May 2025

Starting appearances are listed first, followed by substitute appearances after the + symbol where applicable.

No.	Pos	Nat	Player	Total		WC		FA Cup		League Cup	
No.	Pos	Nat	Player	Apps	Goals	Apps	Goals	Apps	Goals	Apps	Goals
1	GK	(England) ENG	Demi Lambourne	25	0	20	0	4	0	1	0
2	DF	(Republic of Ireland) IRL	Jessie Stapleton	23	2	17	2	3	0	1+2	0
4	DF	(England) ENG	Amy Goddard	26	2	20	1	4	1	1+1	0
5	DF	(England) ENG	Grace McCatty	1	0	0	0	0	0	1	0
6	DF	(England) ENG	Louise Griffiths	3	1	0+2	0	0+1	1	0	0
7	FW	(Wales) WAL	Mary McAteer	21	3	12+4	2	2+1	1	1+1	0
8	FW	(England) ENG	Emily Scarr	26	2	16+4	1	3+1	1	1+1	0
9	FW	(England) ENG	Eleanor Dale	18	13	14	8	2	5	1+1	0
10	MF	(New Zealand) NZL	Katie Kitching	26	6	19	5	4	0	0+3	1
11	DF	(England) ENG	Jessica Brown	22	0	15+1	0	3	0	1+2	0
12	MF	(England) ENG	Emily Cassap	2	1	0+1	0	0	0	1	1
14	MF	(England) ENG	Natasha Fenton	25	2	18+1	2	4	0	2	0
16	DF	(England) ENG	Grace Ede	13	0	9+1	0	1	0	2	0
17	DF	(England) ENG	Mary Corbyn	20	0	10+5	0	3	0	2	0
18	MF	(England) ENG	Libbi McInnes	24	2	8+10	1	3+1	1	2	0
19	DF	(England) ENG	Megan Beer	10	0	5+2	0	1	0	2	0
20	FW	(Wales) WAL	Ellen Jones	18	6	6+6	3	2+2	3	2	0
21	MF	(Republic of Ireland) IRL	Marissa Sheva	3	0	3	0	0	0	0	0
22	GK	(England) ENG	Megan Borthwick	2	0	0	0	0	0	2	0
23	MF	(England) ENG	Jenna Dear	19	2	10+3	1	1+3	1	1+1	0
24	MF	(Republic of Ireland) IRL	Keira Flannery	17	0	6+4	0	1+3	0	3	0
25	FW	(England) ENG	Katy Watson	22	5	4+11	3	1+3	0	3	2
27	DF	(Scotland) SCO	Brianna Westrup	10	0	6+1	0	2+1	0	0	0
54	DF	(Scotland) SCO	Ella West	5	0	2	0	0	0	3	0
58	DF	(England) ENG	Eva Bewicke	1	0	0	0	0	0	0+1	0
60	FW	(England) ENG	Niyah Dunbar	3	0	0+1	0	0	0	0+2	0

=== Goalscorers ===
As of 4 May 2025

Rnk	No	Pos	Nat	Name	WC	FA Cup	League Cup	Total
1	9	FW	(England)	Eleanor Dale	8	5	0	13
2	10	MF	(New Zealand)	Katie Kitching	5	0	1	6
2	20	FW	(Wales)	Ellen Jones	3	3	0	6
4	25	FW	(England)	Katy Watson	3	0	2	5
5	10	FW	(Wales)	Mary McAteer	2	1	0	3
6	2	DF	(Republic of Ireland)	Jessie Stapleton	2	0	0	2
6	4	DF	(England)	Amy Goddard	1	1	0	2
6	8	FW	(England)	Emily Scarr	1	1	0	2
6	14	MF	(England)	Natasha Fenton	2	0	0	2
6	18	MF	(England)	Libbi McInnes	1	1	0	2
6	23	MF	(England)	Jenna Dear	1	1	0	2
12	6	DF	(England)	Louise Griffiths	0	1	0	1
12	12	MF	(England)	Emily Cassap	0	0	1	1
Own goals					1	0	0	1
Total					30	14	4	48

=== Disciplinary record ===
As of 4 May 2025

No.	Pos.	Nat.	Player	WC			FA Cup			League Cup			Total		
No.	Pos.	Nat.	Player	Booked	(yellow card) (yellow-red card)	Sent off (straight red)	Booked	(yellow card) (yellow-red card)	Sent off (straight red)	Booked	(yellow card) (yellow-red card)	Sent off (straight red)	Booked	(yellow card) (yellow-red card)	Sent off (straight red)
1	GK	(England)	Demi Lambourne	3	0	0	0	0	0	0	0	0	3	0	0
2	DF	(Republic of Ireland)	Jessie Stapleton	7	0	0	0	0	0	1	1	0	8	1	0
4	DF	(England)	Amy Goddard	3	0	0	0	0	0	0	0	0	3	0	0
7	FW	(Wales)	Mary McAteer	1	0	0	0	0	0	0	0	0	1	0	0
8	FW	(England)	Emily Scarr	1	0	0	0	0	0	0	0	0	1	0	0
9	FW	(England)	Eleanor Dale	2	0	0	0	0	0	1	0	0	3	0	0
10	MF	(New Zealand)	Katie Kitching	1	0	0	0	0	0	0	0	0	1	0	0
11	DF	(England)	Jessica Brown	4	0	0	0	0	0	1	0	0	5	0	0
14	MF	(England)	Natasha Fenton	8	0	0	1	0	0	0	0	0	9	0	0
16	DF	(England)	Grace Ede	2	0	0	0	0	0	0	0	0	2	0	0
18	MF	(England)	Libbi McInnes	2	0	0	0	0	0	0	0	0	2	0	0
19	DF	(England)	Megan Beer	1	0	0	0	0	0	0	0	0	1	0	0
20	FW	(Wales)	Ellen Jones	1	0	0	0	0	0	1	0	0	2	0	0
21	MF	(Republic of Ireland)	Marissa Sheva	1	0	0	0	0	0	0	0	0	1	0	0
23	MF	(England)	Jenna Dear	4	0	0	1	0	0	1	0	0	6	0	0
27	DF	(Scotland)	Brianna Westrup	2	0	0	0	0	0	0	0	0	2	0	0
58	DF	(England)	Eva Bewicke	0	0	0	0	0	0	1	0	0	1	0	0
Total				43	0	0	2	0	0	6	1	0	51	1	0
