= Rhiannon Roberts =

Welsh footballer (born 1990)

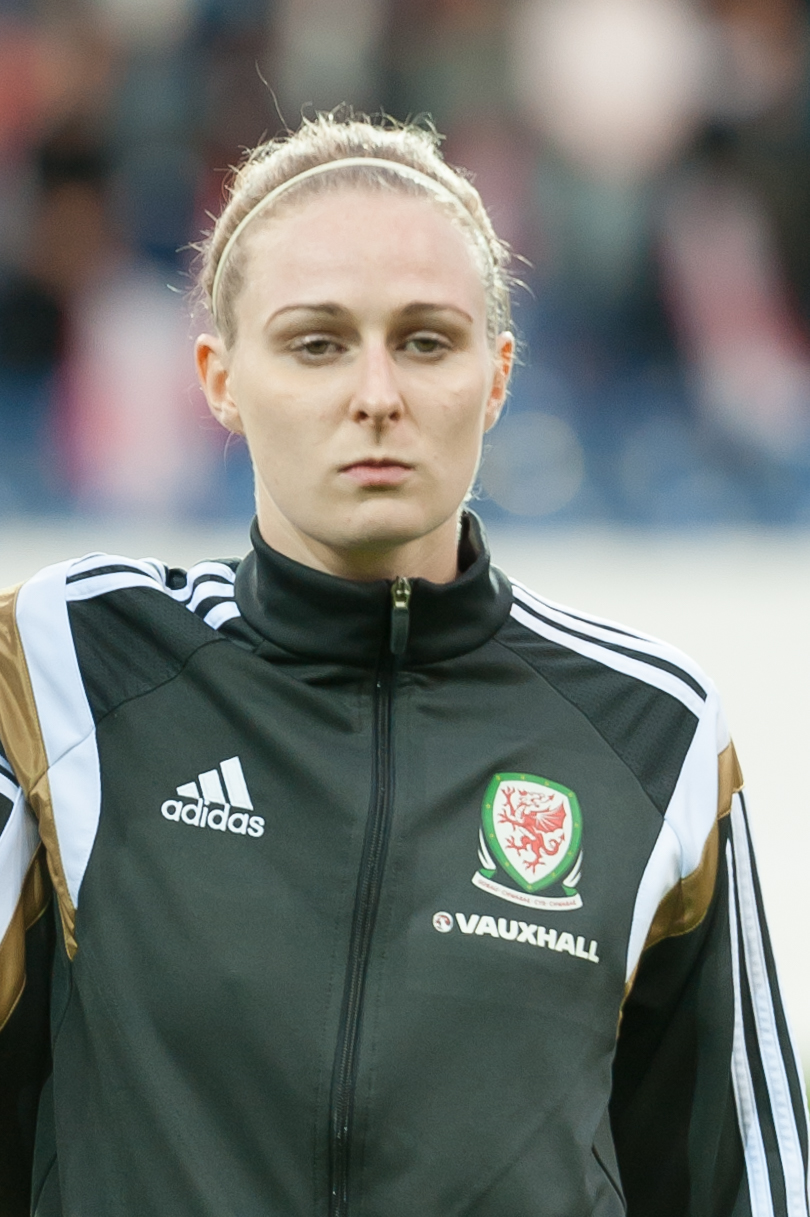
- Roberts with Wales in 2015

Personal information
- Full name: Rhiannon Beth Roberts
- Date of birth: 30 August 1990 (age 36)
- Place of birth: Chester, England
- Height: 1.71 m (5 ft 7 in)
- Position: Centre-back

Team information
- Current team: Sunderland
- Number: 5

Youth career
- Burnley

Senior career*
Years	Team	Apps	(Gls)
2009–2013	Blackburn Rovers	54	(3)
2013–2018	Doncaster Rovers Belles	71	(7)
2018–2023	Liverpool	96	(3)
2023–2025	Betis	49	(3)
2025–	Sunderland	1	(1)

International career^{‡}
2010	England U23		
2015–	Wales	89	(4)
- * Club domestic league appearances and goals as of 27 September 2026 ‡ National team caps and goals as of 9 June 2026

Rhiannon Beth "Razza" Roberts (born 30 August 1990) is a professional footballer who plays as a centre-back for English Women's Super League 2 club Sunderland A.F.C. Women and the Wales women's national team.

== Club career ==
=== 2008–2013 ===
Roberts broke into the Blackburn Rovers Ladies first team towards the end of the 2008–09 season. Her first Blackburn goal came in April 2009, against Birmingham City Ladies in the FA Women's Premier League.

=== 2013–2018 ===
She left Blackburn for a 15-month contract with Doncaster Rovers Belles in July 2013.

=== 2018–present ===
After five seasons with the Belles, Roberts joined Liverpool in July 2018. She signed a new contract in May 2021, and the following season helped the team win the Championship, securing a return to the Women's Super League for the club after two seasons in the second tier.

In June 2023, Roberts signed for Real Betis.

On 1 July 2025, it was announced that Roberts had signed for Women's Super League 2 side Sunderland. She was named as the team's captain ahead of the 2025-26 season. She scored her first goal for the club in the opening game of the 2025-26 WSL2 season, scoring in the 52nd minute of a 4-0 win over Sheffield United on 5 September 2025.

== International career ==
Roberts has represented England Colleges, playing in the side's first ever fixture, against Australia schools in February 2008. In June 2010 she was called up by coach Brent Hills to the England Under–23 team for a mini tournament at the University of Warwick. The following year Roberts represented Great Britain at the 2011 Universiade in Shenzhen, China. Despite Roberts' opening goal, Britain were eliminated after a 3–2 defeat by the hosts at Bao'an Stadium.

In August 2015 Roberts' good form with Doncaster Rovers Belles won her a call-up to a training camp with Jayne Ludlow's senior Wales squad. She was selected for Wales' next UEFA Women's Euro 2017 qualifying match in Austria and started the 3–0 defeat in Sankt Pölten.

In June 2025, Roberts was named in Wales' squad for UEFA Women's Euro 2025.

== Other work ==
In April 2026, Roberts began writing a column for BBC Sport.

== Career statistics ==
=== Club ===
As of match played 27 September 2026

Some entries may be missing or incomplete due to lack of historical statistics.

Appearances and goals by club, season and competition
Club	Season	League			National cup (Note: Includes the Women's FA Cup)		League cup (Note: Includes the WSL Cup/Women's League Cup and FA Women's National League Cup)		Total	
Club	Season	Division	Apps	Goals	Apps	Goals	Apps	Goals	Apps	Goals
Blackburn Rovers	2008–09	WPL	4	0	0	0	0	0	4	0
Blackburn Rovers	2009–10	WPL	19	1	0	0	1	0	20	1
Blackburn Rovers	2010–11	WPL (Tier 2)	13	1	0	0	1	0	14	1
Blackburn Rovers	2011–12	WPL Northern Division	3	0	0	0	0	0	3	0
Blackburn Rovers	2012–13	WPL Northern Division	15	1	0	0	5	0	20	1
Blackburn Rovers	Total		54	3	0	0	7	0	61	3
Doncaster Rovers Belles	2013	WSL	9	0	0	0	0	0	9	0
Doncaster Rovers Belles	2014	WSL 2	12	1	2	0	5	0	19	1
Doncaster Rovers Belles	2015	WSL 2	16	2	2	0	5	0	23	2
Doncaster Rovers Belles	2016	WSL	16	1	1	0	2	0	19	2
Doncaster Rovers Belles	2017	WSL 2	2	0	0	0	—		2	0
Doncaster Rovers Belles	2017–18	WSL 2	16	3	1	0	4	0	21	3
Doncaster Rovers Belles	Total		71	7	6	0	16	0	93	7
Liverpool	2018–19	WSL	8	0	2	0	2	0	12	0
Liverpool	2019–20	WSL	12	0	0	0	3	1	15	1
Liverpool	2020–21	Championship	19	0	1	0	2	0	22	0
Liverpool	2021–22	Championship	17	0	2	0	5	0	24	0
Liverpool	2022–23	WSL	19	1	0	0	3	1	22	2
Liverpool	Total		75	1	5	0	15	2	95	3
Real Betis Féminas	2023–24	Liga F	25	2	1	0	—		26	2
Real Betis Féminas	2024–25	Liga F	24	1	1	0	—		25	1
Real Betis Féminas	Total		49	3	2	0	—		51	3
Sunderland	2025–26	Women's Super League 2	17	1	1	0	0	0	18	1
Sunderland	2026–27	Women's Super League 2	4	1	0	0	0	0	4	1
Sunderland	Total		21	2	1	0	0	0	22	2
Career total			270	16	14	0	38	2	322	18

=== International ===
As of matches played 9 June 2026, statistics from the Football Association of Wales

Appearances and goals by national team and year
National team	Year	Apps	Goals
Wales	2015	4	0
Wales	2016	3	0
Wales	2017	5	0
Wales	2018	8	0
Wales	2019	8	1
Wales	2020	5	0
Wales	2021	9	0
Wales	2022	14	1
Wales	2023	9	0
Wales	2024	10	0
Wales	2025	9	0
Wales	2026	5	2
Total		89	4

Scores and results list Wales' goal tally first, score column indicates score after each Roberts goal.

List of international goals scored by Rhiannon Roberts
No.	Date	Venue	Opponent	Score	Result	Competition
1	29 August 2019	Tórsvøllur, Tórshavn, Faroe Islands	Faroe Islands	6–0	6–0	UEFA Women's Euro 2022 qualifying
2	11 October 2022	Letzigrund, Zürich, Switzerland	Switzerland	1–0	1–2 (a.e.t.)	2023 FIFA Women's World Cup qualification - UEFA play-offs
3	14 April 2026	Racecourse Ground, Wrexham, Wales	Albania	3–0	4–0	2027 FIFA Women's World Cup qualification
4	18 April 2026	Elbasan Arena, Elbasan, Albania	Albania	1–0	1–0	2027 FIFA Women's World Cup qualification

== Honours ==
Liverpool

- Championship: 2021–22

Doncaster Rovers Belles

- WSL 2: Winner: 2017–18, Runner-Up: 2014, 2015, 2017
