= Fran Stenson =

English association football player

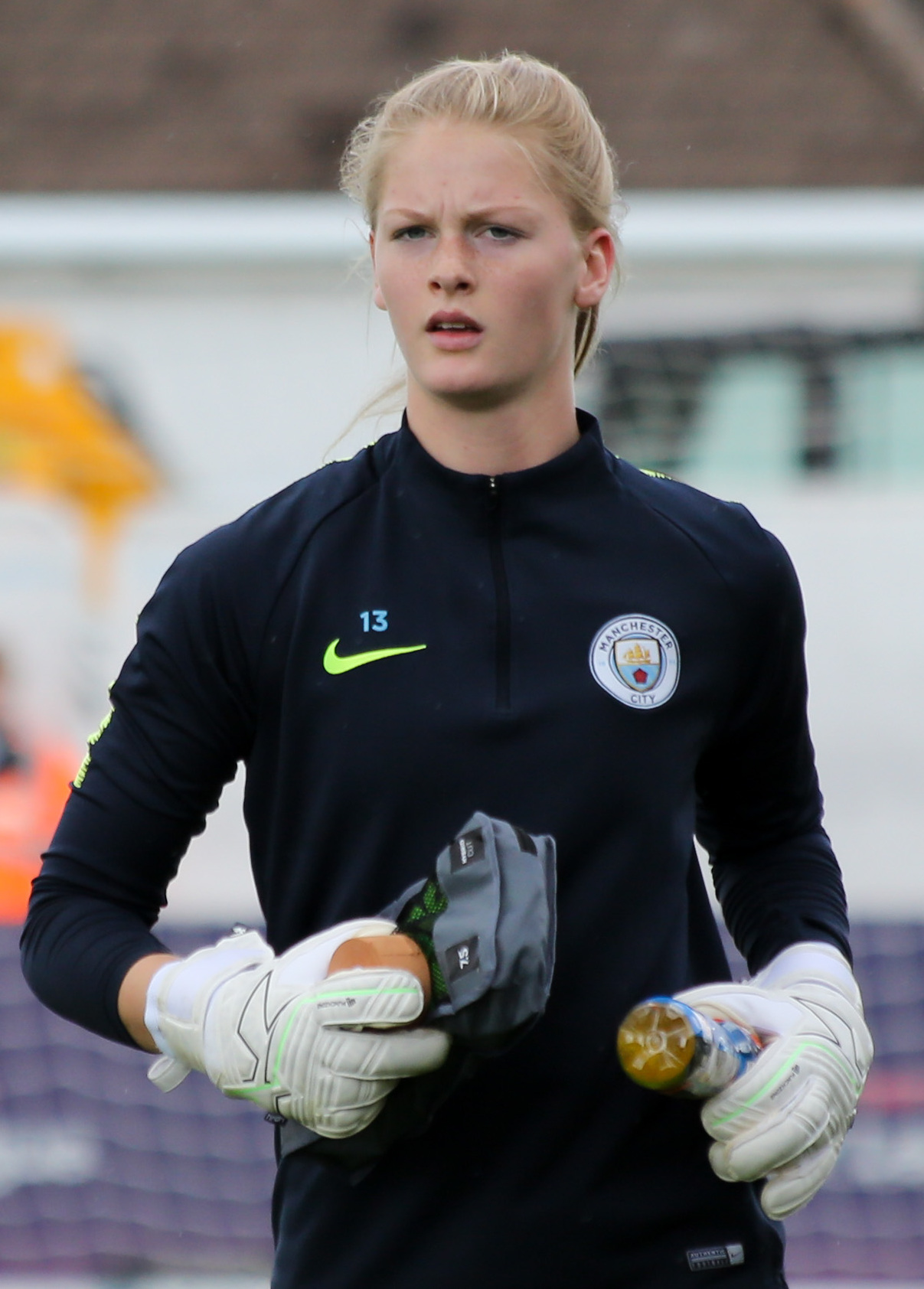
- Stenson warming up for Manchester City before a match on 11 May 2019

Personal information
- Full name: Frances Stenson
- Date of birth: 27 April 2001 (age 25)
- Place of birth: England
- Position: Goalkeeper

Team information
- Current team: Sunderland
- Number: 1

Youth career
- Birmingham City

Senior career*
| Years | Team | Apps | (Gls) |
| 2017–2018 | Birmingham City | 1 | (0) |
| 2018–2019 | Manchester City | 0 | (0) |
| 2019 | → Blackburn Rovers (loan) | 1 | (0) |
| 2019–2023 | Arsenal | 0 | (0) |
| 2019–2020 | → Blackburn Rovers (loan) | 9 | (0) |
| 2021 | → Brighton & Hove Albion (loan) | 0 | (0) |
| 2022–2023 | → Birmingham City (loan) | 0 | (0) |
| 2023 | → Sheffield United (loan) | 11 | (0) |
| 2023–2024 | Sheffield United | 20 | (0) |
| 2024–2026 | Southampton | 42 | (0) |
| 2026– | Sunderland | 8 | (0) |

International career^{‡}
| 2017–2018 | England U17 | 6 | (0) |
| 2019 | England U18 | 3 | (0) |
| 2019–2020 | England U19 | 7 | (0) |
| 2024– | England U23 | 2 | (0) |
- * Club domestic league appearances and goals as of 15 November 2026 ‡ National team caps and goals as of 22:29, 28 November 2024

Fran Stenson (born 27 April 2001) is an English footballer who plays as a goalkeeper for Women's Championship club Sunderland and the England under-23 team.

== Club career ==
Fran Stenson made her professional debut on 1 October 2017 when she came on as a second-half substitute for Ann-Katrin Berger in Birmingham City's 2–1 win over Everton in the FA WSL, though she had previously started for England U17s a few weeks earlier. Following a transfer to Manchester City, she made her full club start in the FA WSL Cup against Aston Villa on 13 December 2018.

In February 2019, Stenson went on loan to Blackburn Rovers of the FA Women's National League North. She was understudying Karen Bardsley and Ellie Roebuck at Manchester City, while Blackburn urgently required a goalkeeper following injuries to both Danielle Gibbons and Danielle Hill.

During preseason, Stenson appeared as part of the Arsenal squad during the Emirates Cup. She officially signed with the team on 16 August 2019. On 6 September 2019, Stenson returned to Blackburn Rovers on loan, this time in the FA Women's Championship.

On 11 July 2024, Stenson joined Women's Championship club Southampton.

== Career statistics ==
=== Club ===
As of match played 15 November 2026

| Club | Season | League | | | National Cup | | League Cup | | Total | |
| Club | Season | Division | Apps | Goals | Apps | Goals | Apps | Goals | Apps | Goals |
|---|---|---|---|---|---|---|---|---|---|---|
| Birmingham City | 2017–18 | FA WSL | 1 | 0 | 0 | 0 | 0 | 0 | 1 | 0 |
| Manchester City | 2018–19 | | 0 | 0 | 0 | 0 | 1 | 0 | 1 | 0 |
| Blackburn Rovers (loan) | 2018–19 | National League North | 1 | 0 | 0 | 0 | 1 | 0 | 2 | 0 |
| Arsenal | 2019–20 | FA WSL | 0 | 0 | 0 | 0 | 1 | 0 | 1 | 0 |
| Arsenal | 2020–21 | FA WSL | 0 | 0 | 0 | 0 | 1 | 0 | 1 | 0 |
| Arsenal | Total | | 0 | 0 | 0 | 0 | 2 | 0 | 2 | 0 |
| Blackburn Rovers (loan) | 2019–20 | Women's Championship | 9 | 0 | 0 | 0 | 0 | 0 | 9 | 0 |
| Brighton & Hove Albion (loan) | 2021-22 | WSL | 0 | 0 | 0 | 0 | 0 | 0 | 0 | 0 |
| Birmingham City (loan) | 2022–23 | Women's Championship | 0 | 0 | 0 | 0 | 0 | 0 | 0 | 0 |
| Sheffield United | 2022–23 | Women's Championship | 11 | 0 | 0 | 0 | 0 | 0 | 11 | 0 |
| Sheffield United | 2023–24 | Women's Championship | 20 | 0 | 1 | 0 | 0 | 0 | 21 | 0 |
| Sheffield United | Total | | 31 | 0 | 1 | 0 | 0 | 0 | 32 | 0 |
| Southampton | 2024–25 | Women's Championship | 20 | 0 | 0 | 0 | 0 | 0 | 20 | 0 |
| Southampton | 2025–26 | Women's Super League 2 | 22 | 0 | 1 | 0 | 2 | 0 | 25 | 0 |
| Southampton | Total | | 42 | 0 | 1 | 0 | 2 | 0 | 45 | 0 |
| Sunderland | 2026–27 | Women's Super League 2 | 8 | 0 | 0 | 0 | 0 | 0 | 8 | 0 |
| Career total | | | 92 | 0 | 2 | 0 | 6 | 0 | 100 | 0 |
