= 2011 FA Cup =

2011 FA Cup may refer to:

- 2010–11 FA Cup
  - 2011 FA Cup final
- 2010–11 FA Women's Cup
  - 2011 FA Women's Cup final
- 2011–12 FA Cup
- 2011–12 FA Women's Cup
