= Katy Watson =

English footballer

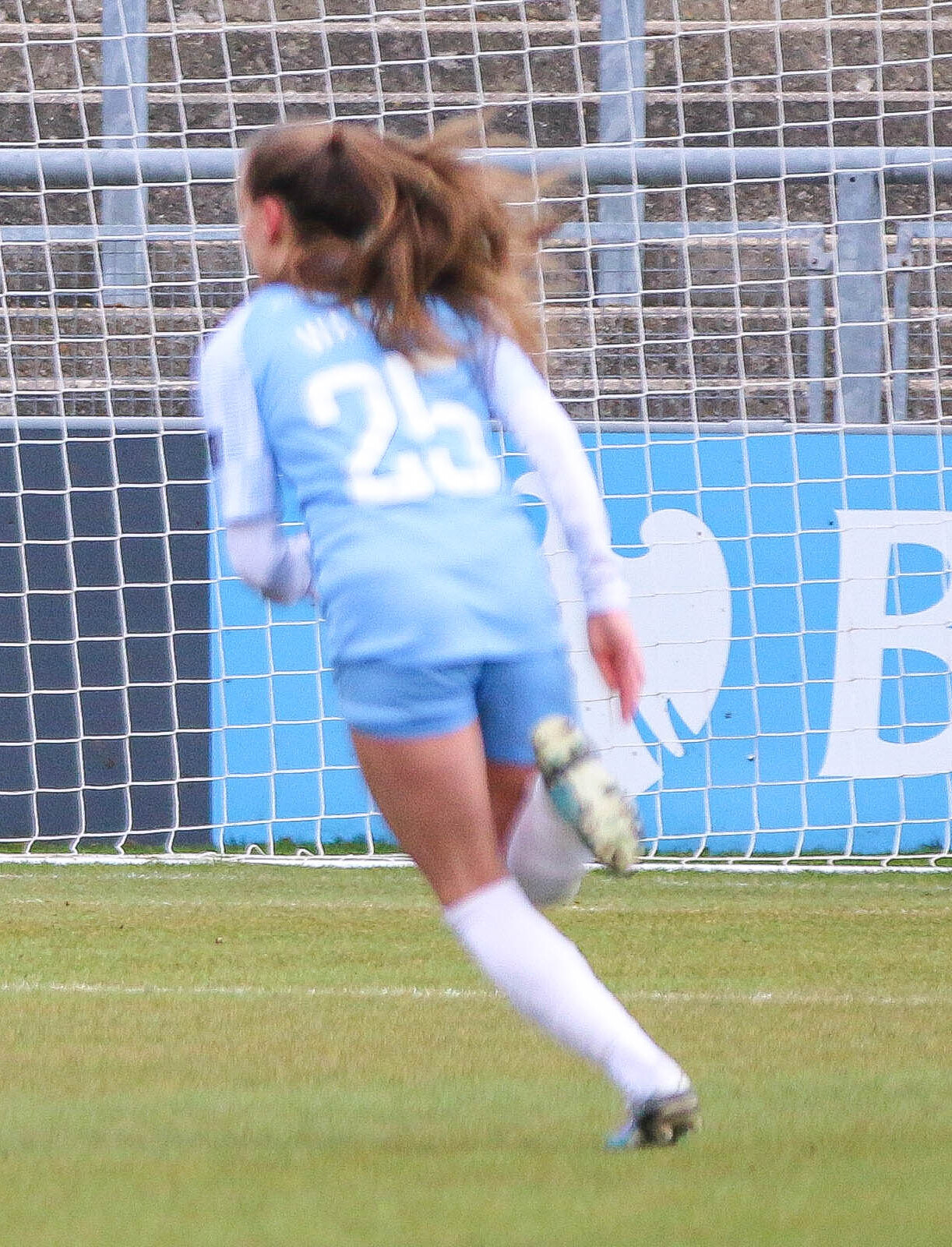
- Watson playing for Sunderland in 2023

Personal information
- Full name: Katy Evelyn Watson
- Date of birth: 20 October 2005 (age 21)
- Place of birth: England
- Position: Forward

Team information
- Current team: Sunderland
- Number: 7

Youth career
- Sunderland
- Sunderland & Gateshead

Senior career*
Years	Team	Apps	(Gls)
2021–	Sunderland	54	(16)

International career^{‡}
2022–	England U19	12	(4)
- * Club domestic league appearances and goals as of 15 November 2026 ‡ National team caps and goals as of 14 July 2024

Katy Evelyn Watson (born 20 October 2005) is an English professional footballer who plays as a forward for Women's Championship club Sunderland and the England under-19 team.

== Youth career ==
Watson joined Sunderland aged 9, after trialing for Newcastle United. Along with her teammates at senior level, she played boys football prior to joining the girls team.

Watson played for Sunderland & Gateshead under-14s, scoring 10 goals in 13 appearances, followed by scoring 6 goals in as many games for the under-16s. She went on to play for Sunderland's under-21 side, scoring a combined 10 goals in 5 appearances for the A and B teams.

== Club career ==
On 28 January 2022, Sunderland announced the signing of Watson to the first team.

On 28 March 2022, Watson scored her debut senior goal for Sunderland against Watford within seven minutes of coming on as a second-half substitute, helping the team to win 2–1.

On 25 October 2023, after 39 appearances for Sunderland, Watson signed her first professional contract with the club aged 18. She was subsequently voted Women's Young Player of the Year for 2023 by the North East Football Writers.

== International career ==
On 5 April 2023, Watson scored her debut goal for the England under-19 team in a 2023 U19 Championship qualification match against Slovenia, a last minute equaliser to secure a 1–1 draw.

In October 2023, for 2024 U19 Championship qualification, Watson scored in injury time against Greece in a 2–0 win, followed by the third goal in the 6–1 victory over Wales. She went to play in the second round qualification matches against Switzerland and Italy as the number 7 wide attacker. On 14 July in the final tournament, Watson scored the second goal in England's 10–0 victory over Lithuania in the opening group stage match.

== Career statistics ==
=== Club ===
As of match played 15 November 2026

Some entries may be missing or incomplete due to lack of historical statistics.

Club	Season	League			National Cup		League Cup		Total	
Club	Season	Division	Apps	Goals	Apps	Goals	Apps	Goals	Apps	Goals
Sunderland	2021–22	Women's Championship	1	1	0	0	0	0	1	1
Sunderland	2022–23	Women's Championship	3	3	1	0	1	0	5	3
Sunderland	2023–24	Women's Championship	4	2	1	0	5	1	10	3
Sunderland	2024–25	Women's Championship	17	3	3	0	3	2	23	5
Sunderland	2025–26	Women's Super League 2	22	4	2	2	3	0	27	6
Sunderland	2026–27	Women's Super League 2	7	3	0	0	3	0	10	3
Career total			54	16	7	2	15	3	76	21

== Honours ==
Individual

- Sunderland Women's Young Player of the Year: 2022–23
- North East Football Writers Women's Young Player of the Year: 2023
