= Megan Alexander =

English footballer (born 1993)

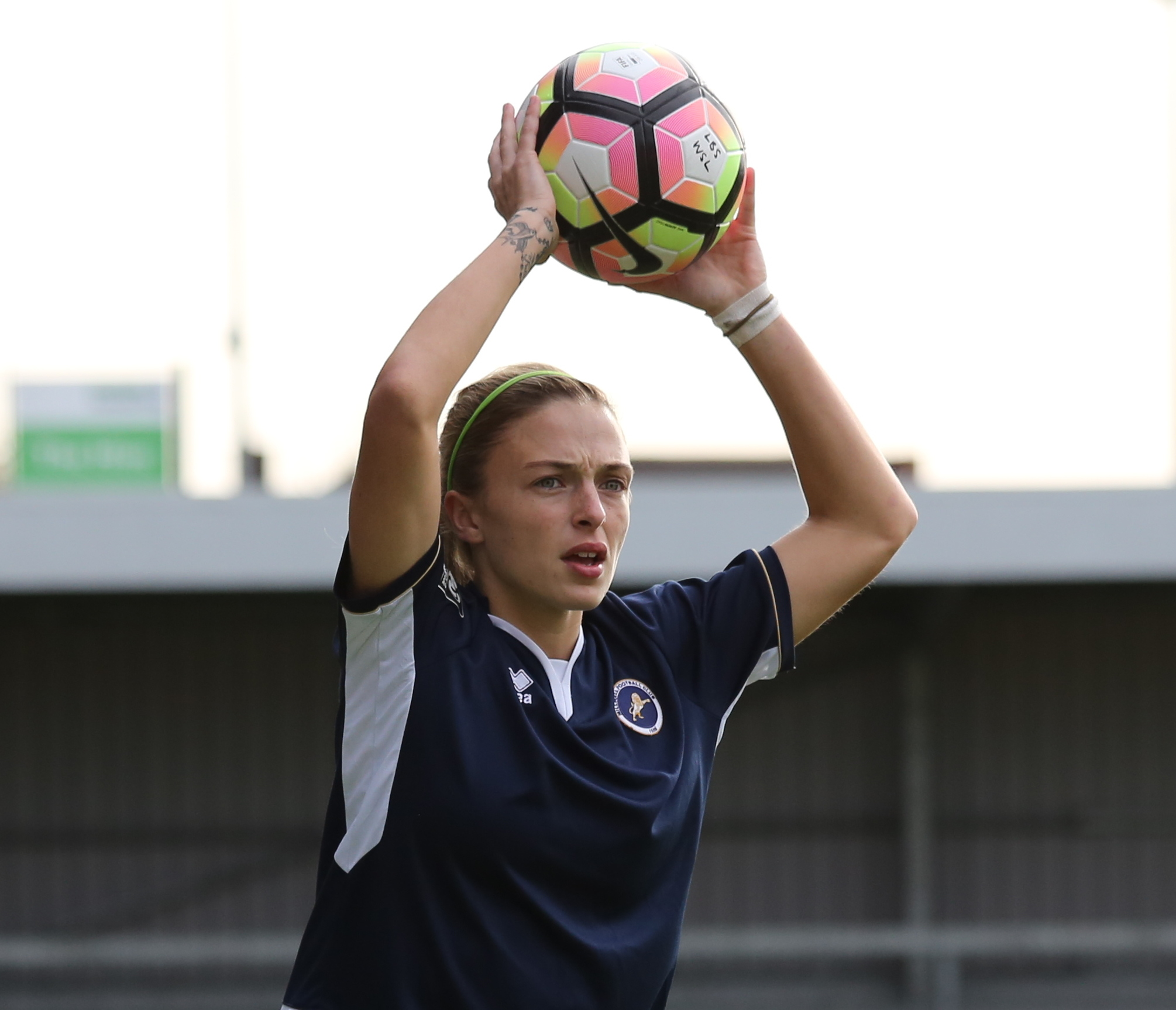
- Alexander in 2017

Personal information
- Full name: Megan Kelly Alexander
- Date of birth: 11 November 1993 (age 33)
- Place of birth: Wantage, England
- Position: Defender

Youth career
- Reading
- Liverpool

Senior career*
Years	Team	Apps	(Gls)
2014	Liverpool		
2014	→ Oxford United (loan)	10	(0)
2015	Everton	4	(0)
2016–2017	Bristol City	21	(0)
2017–2018	Millwall Lionesses	18	(0)
2018–2019	Yeovil Town	20	(1)
2019–2021	London Bees	9	(0)
2021–2022	Oxford United	6	(0)
2022–2023	Coventry United	22	(0)

International career^{‡}
- England U-17
- * Club domestic league appearances and goals as of 14 June 2020 ‡ National team caps and goals as of 25 October 2016

Megan Kelly Alexander (born 11 November 1993) is an English footballer who plays as a defender. She has previously played for Liverpool, Oxford United, Everton, Bristol City, Millwall Lionesses, Yeovil Town, and Coventry United. Alexander has represented England at under-17 level.

== Playing career ==
=== Liverpool and Oxford United, 2014 ===
In June 2014, Alexander was loaned on a three-month deal to Oxford United from Liverpool. Oxford finished in ninth place during the regular season with a 3–12–3 record. Alexander made eight appearances during the regular season. She made two additional appearances during the FA WSL Continental Cup and FA Women's Cup.

=== Everton, 2015 ===
In January 2015, Alexander signed with Everton F.C. (women) to complete in the 2015 FA WSL 2. She made four appearances for the club during the regular season. Everton finished in third place with a 8–3–7 record.

=== Bristol City, 2016–2017 ===
Alexander signed with Bristol City ahead of the 2016 FA WSL season. Of the signing, Bristol manager Willie Kirk said, "It became apparent quite quickly however, that she was a player that I wanted to work with in the longer term. She is young, enthusiastic, and is hungry to learn and develop. She gives us good options down the left hand side both defensively and attacking and I'm sure that she will be an important player for us this year." Alexander made 15 appearances for the club helping finish in second place with a 11–33–3 record. The team's placement secured promotion back to FA WSL 1 for the 2017–18 FA WSL season.

=== Yeovil Town, 2018–2019 ===
On 15 August 2018, Alexander signed for FA Women's Super League side Yeovil Town linking up with her former Millwall Lionesses manager Lee Burch.

=== London Bees, 2019–2021 ===
In August 2019, following Yeovil's relegation to the FA Women's National League South, Alexander once again reunited with manager Lee Burch, this time at FA Women's Championship team London Bees.

=== International ===
Alexander has represented England on the under-17 national team.
