= 2011 FA Women's Cup final =

English football cup final

- The match programme cover
- Event: 2010–11 FA Women's Cup
Arsenal	Bristol Academy
2	0
- Date: 21 May 2011
- Venue: Ricoh Arena, Coventry
- Player of the Match: Kim Little (Arsenal)
- Referee: Sian Massey
- Attendance: 13,885

The 2011 FA Women's Cup final was the 41st final of the FA Women's Cup, England's primary cup competition for women's football teams. The showpiece event was the 18th to be played directly under the auspices of the Football Association (FA). The final was contested between Arsenal Ladies and Bristol Academy on 21 May 2011 at Ricoh Arena in Coventry. Holders Arsenal made its 11th final win. The win cemented Arsenal's qualification for the 2011-12 UEFA Women's Champions League for the ninth time in 10 years. Midfielder Kim Little was named Player of the Match.

== Match details ==
21 May 2011
15:00 BST

Arsenal	2–0	Bristol Academy
Little 19'; Fleeting 32'	Report

Ricoh Arena, Coventry
Attendance: 13,885
Referee: Sian Massey

Arsenal	Bristol Academy

GK	1	(Republic of Ireland) Emma Byrne
DF	2	(England) Steph Houghton
DF	7	(Republic of Ireland) Ciara Grant
DF	5	(England) Gilly Flaherty
DF	19	(England) Niamh Fahey
MF	8	(England) Jordan Nobbs
MF	17	(England) Katie Chapman (c)
MF	16	(Scotland) Kim Little
MF	11	(England) Rachel Yankey	(substituted off) 90'
FW	9	(England) Ellen White
FW	10	(Scotland) Julie Fleeting	(substituted off) 80'
Substitutes:
GK	13	(Jamaica) Rebecca Spencer
FW	15	(England) Danielle Carter	(substituted on) 90'
DF	14	(Scotland) Jen Beattie	(substituted on) 80'
DF	3	(Republic of Ireland) Yvonne Tracy
MF	29	(England) Laura Coombs
Manager:
(England) Laura Harvey

GK	1	(England) Siobhan Chamberlain
DF	2	(England) Grace McCatty
DF	3	(England) Corinne Yorston (c)
DF	19	(England) Jemma Rose
DF	18	(England) Alex Culvin	(substituted off) 68'
MF	8	(England) Katie Daley
MF	16	(Netherlands) Anouk Hoogendijk
MF	11	(England) Loren Dykes
MF	10	(Wales) Jess Fishlock	(substituted off) 46'
FW	7	(Wales) Helen Bleazard
FW	9	(England) Ann-Marie Heatherson	(substituted off) 84'
Substitutes:
FW	12	(England) Molly Clark	(substituted on) 68'
DF	15	(England) Lillie Billson	(substituted on) 46'
MF	6	(England) Michelle Green	(substituted on) 84'
GK	2	(England) Alex Windell
DF	5	(England) Emma Jones
Manager:
(England) Mark Sampson

Player of the match
Kim Little (Arsenal)

Assistant referees:
S. Hollins
L. May
Fourth official:
Sarah Garratt

Match rules

- 90 minutes.
- 30 minutes of extra-time if necessary.
- Penalty shoot-out if scores still level.
- Five named substitutes.
- Maximum of three substitutions.
