= 2026–27 Sunderland A.F.C. Women season =

English football club season

Sunderland Women
2026–27 season
- Owner: Bay Collective (Sixth Street Partners)
- Head coach: Melanie Reay
- Stadium: Eppleton Colliery Welfare Ground
- WSL2: 2nd
- FA Cup: Third round
- League Cup: League Stage, 11th
- Top goalscorer: League: Elise Hughes (5); All: Elise Hughes (5)
- Highest home attendance: 513 vs Leicester City at Eppleton Colliery Welfare Ground (Women's Super League 2); 5,705 vs Newcastle United at Stadium of Light (Women's Super League 2)
- Lowest home attendance: 330 vs Sheffield United (WSL Players Cup)
- Average home league attendance: 1,737
- Biggest win: 4–1 vs Bristol City (H) (Women's Super League 2, 6 September 2026); 4–1 vs Durham (A) (Women's Super League 2, 8 November 2026)
- Biggest defeat: 4–2 vs Liverpool (A) (WSL Players Cup, 23 September 2026); 3–1 vs Ipswich Town (A) (Women's Super League 2, 25 October 2026); 3–1 vs Birmingham City (A) (WSL Players Cup, 11 November 2026)
Home colours	Away colours	Third colours
- All statistics correct as of 11 November 2026.

The 2026–27 season is the 37th season in the history of Sunderland A.F.C. Women and their sixth consecutive season in the Women's Super League 2. The club participate in the Women's Super League 2, the Women's FA Cup, and the Women's League Cup.

This is the team's first full season as part of the multi-club ownership organisation Bay Collective, following their agreement to acquire a majority stake in Sunderland Women in April 2026.

== Transfers ==
=== In ===
Date	Pos.	Player	From	Ref.
2 July 2026	ST	(Wales) Elise Hughes	(England) Crystal Palace	
6 July 2026	CB	(Wales) Tara Bourne	(England) Southampton	
10 July 2026	GK	(England) Fran Stenson	(England) Southampton	
16 July 2026	GK	(United States) Noa Schumacher	(Scotland) Hibernian	
25 July 2026	CM	(Jamaica) Atlanta Primus	(England) Southampton	
12 August 2026	CM	(Belgium) Kassandra Missipo	(Italy) Sassuolo	
26 August 2026	RB	(France) Tess Laplacette	(France) Olympique de Marseille	

=== Out ===
Date	Pos.	Player	Subsequent club	Join date	Ref.
1 July 2026	RW	(Jamaica) Reanna Blades	(England) Portsmouth	26 September 2026	
1 July 2026	CM	(Republic of Ireland) Jamie Finn	(England) Burnley	22 July 2026	
1 July 2026	CB	(England) Hannah Greenwood	(England) Watford	23 July 2026	
1 July 2026	GK	(England) Demi Lambourne	(England) Watford	26 July 2026	
1 July 2026	CM	(Wales) Ellen Jones (footballer)	(England) Wolverhampton Wanderers	29 July 2026	
1 July 2026	CM	(England) Libbi McInnes	(England) Southampton	29 July 2026	
1 July 2026	GK	(Republic of Ireland) Grace Moloney	(England) Southampton	29 July 2026	
1 July 2026	ST	(England) Eleanor Dale	(United States) Tampa Bay Sun	11 August 2026	
1 July 2026	LB	(England) Louise Griffiths	(England) Wallsend BC	22 August 2026	

=== Loaned in ===
Date	Pos.	Player	From	Date until	Ref.
24 July 2026	ST	(Finland) Sanni Franssi	(England) London City Lionesses	End of Season	
1 August 2026	ST	(England) Lily Dent	(England) Brighton & Hove Albion	End of Season	
4 September 2026	RB	(England) Ria Bose	(England) West Ham United	31 December 2026 ||	

=== Loans out ===
Date	Pos.	Player	To	Date until	Ref.
29 July 2026	CM	(Northern Ireland) Niamh Boothroyd	(England) Middlesbrough	End of Season	
29 July 2026	ST	(England) Niyah Dunbar	(England) Norwich City	End of Season	
4 September 2026	CB	(Scotland) Ella West	(England) Loughborough Lightning	End of Season	

== Pre-season and friendlies ==
On 4 July 2026, Sunderland announced their first fixture of pre-season against Middlesbrough at Eppleton CW. This game was later moved behind closed doors at the Academy of Light.The Lasses also played a game against Leicester City.

Win Draw Loss Fixtures

26 July 2026 Friendly	Sunderland	?-?	Middlesbrough	Cleadon
				Stadium: Academy of Light; Attendance: 0 (Behind-closed-doors)
Note: Note: While this fixture was announced on 4 July 2026, no details of the match were shared by either club. It is unclear whether this match went ahead.

29 August 2026 Friendly	Leicester City	0–2	Sunderland	Leicester
		Report	?; ?	Stadium: Belvoir Drive; Attendance: 0 (Behind-closed-doors)

== Competitions ==
=== Overall record ===
Competition	First match	Last match	Starting round	Final position	Record							
Competition	First match	Last match	Starting round	Final position	Pld	W	D	L	GF	GA	GD	Win %
Women's Super League 2	6 September 2026	8 May 2027	Matchday 1	2nd	8	5	2	1	16	8	+8	62.50
FA Cup	13 December 2026		Third round	Third round					—			
League Cup	23 September 2026		League stage	League Stage	4	2	0	2	5	7	−2	50.00
Total					12	7	2	3	21	15	+6	58.33

Last updated: 15 November 2026
Source: Competitions

=== Women's Super League 2 ===
==== League table ====
Pos	Team	Pld	W	D	L	GF	GA	GD	Pts	Qualification
1	Newcastle United	8	6	2	0	19	3	+16	20	Promotion to the WSL (Note: Dependent on obtaining a licence.)
2	Sunderland	8	5	2	1	16	8	+8	17	Qualification for pre-qualifying play-off
3	Ipswich Town	8	5	2	1	13	7	+6	17	Qualification for pre-qualifying play-off
4	Bristol City	8	5	1	2	17	11	+6	16	
5	Nottingham Forest	8	3	5	0	15	9	+6	14	

Updated to match(es) played on 15 November 2026. Source: WSL 2 League Table
Rules for classification: 1) Points; 2) Goal difference; 3) Number of goals scored

==== Results summary ====
Overall								Home						Away					
Pld	W	D	L	GF	GA	GD	Pts	W	D	L	GF	GA	GD	W	D	L	GF	GA	GD
8	5	2	1	16	8	+8	17	2	2	0	7	2	+5	3	0	1	9	6	+3

Last updated: 15 November 2026.
Source: Soccerway

==== Results by matchday ====
Matchday	1	2	3	4	5	6	7	8	9	10	11	12	13	14	15	16	17	18	19	20	21	22
Result	W	W	D	W	W	L	W	D														
Position	1	1	2	2	2	3	2	2														
Points	3	6	7	10	13	13	16	17														

Updated to match(es) played on 15 November 2026. Source: Soccerway
W = Win; D = Draw; L = Loss

==== Matches ====
6 September 2026 1	Sunderland	4-1	Bristol City	Hetton-le-Hole
14:00 BST	Roberts 27'; Primus (yellow card) 31'; Corbyn (yellow card) 39'; Missipo (yellow card) 43'; Kitching 50'; Watson 77', 83'	Report	Lindström 14'; Markvardsen (yellow card) 19'	Stadium: Eppleton CW; Attendance: 339; Referee: Callum Parke

13 September 2026 2	Burnley	1-2	Sunderland	Burnley
14:00 BST	Hughes 38' (o.g.); Cairns (yellow card) 90+2'	Report	Hughes 28', 90+8'; Corbyn (yellow card) 37'; Brown (yellow card) 71'	Stadium: Turf Moor; Attendance: 590; Referee: Ryan Atkin

20 September 2025 3	Sunderland	0-0	Southampton	Sunderland
19:00 BST	Laplacette (yellow card) 19'	Report	McInnes (yellow card) 15'	Stadium: Stadium of Light; Attendance: 391; Referee: Joanne Horwood

27 September 2026 4	Watford	1-2	Sunderland	Watford
14:00 BST	Lyon (yellow card) 64'; Jones 74'; Skyers (yellow card) 84'	Report	Primus (yellow card) 8'; Franssi 18'; Hughes 28'; Brown (yellow card) 57'; Bourne (yellow card) 73'	Stadium: Vicarage Road; Attendance: 639; Referee: Jodie Hunter

4 October 2026 5	Sunderland	3-1	Leicester City	Hetton-le-Hole
14:00 BST	Kitching 10'; Hughes 54'; Franssi 64'; Dent (yellow card) 80'	Report	Ale 24'; Pelgander (yellow card) 39'; Dennis (yellow card) 45+5'; Sherwood (yellow card) 69'; Payne (yellow card) 77'	Stadium: Eppleton CW; Attendance: 513; Referee: Julia Kings

25 October 2026 6	Ipswich Town	3-1	Sunderland	Myland
14:00 GMT	Dear (yellow card) 6'; Timms 11'; Palmer (yellow card) 45'; Ademiluyi 57', 67'	Report	Hughes 3'; Kitching (yellow card) 26'; Brown (yellow card) 45+1'; Laplacette (red card) 48'	Stadium: Colchester Community Stadium; Attendance: 734; Referee: Ryan Atkin

8 November 2026 7	Durham	1-4	Sunderland	Durham
12:00 GMT	Briggs (yellow card) 50'; Pennock 69'; Ayre (yellow card) 89'	Report	Kitching 17'; Franssi 29'; Watson 37'; Scarr (yellow card) 90+1'; Sheva 90+3'	Stadium: Maiden Castle; Referee: Jodie Hunter

15 November 2026 8	Sunderland	0-0	Newcastle United	Sunderland
14:00 GMT	Corbyn (yellow card) 56'	Report	Antonsdóttir (yellow card) 30'; Kiernan (yellow card) 69'; Thomas (yellow card) 74'	Stadium: Stadium of Light; Attendance: 5,705; Referee: Sophie Dennington

20 December 2026 9	Sheffield United	v	Sunderland	Sheffield
14:00 GMT				Stadium: Bramall Lane

10 January 2027 10	Sunderland	v	Wolverhampton Wanderers	Hetton-le-Hole
14:00 GMT				Stadium: Eppleton CW

24 January 2027 11	Sunderland	v	Nottingham Forest	West Bridgford
14:00 GMT				Stadium: City Ground

27 January 2027 12	Sunderland	v	Burnley	Hetton-le-Hole
19:00 GMT				Stadium: Eppleton CW

31 January 2027 13	Sunderland	v	Durham	Hetton-le-Hole
14:00 GMT				Stadium: Eppleton CW

7 February 2027 14	Wolverhampton Wanderers	v	Sunderland	Wellington
14:00 GMT				Stadium: New Bucks Head

14 February 2027 15	Sunderland	v	Ipswich Town	Hetton-le-Hole
14:00 GMT				Stadium: Eppleton CW

14 March 2027 16	Bristol City	v	Sunderland	Bristol
14:00 GMT				Stadium: Ashton Gate

21 March 2026 17	Sunderland	v	Nottingham Forest	Sunderland
14:00 GMT				Stadium: Stadium of Light

28 March 2027 18	Newcastle United	v	Sunderland	Newcastle upon Tyne
14:00 BST				Stadium: St James' Park

4 April 2027 19	Sunderland	v	Sheffield United	Sunderland
14:00 BST				Stadium: Stadium of Light

11 April 2027 20	Southampton	v	Sunderland	Havant
14:00 BST				Stadium: Westleigh Park

2 May 2027 21	Leicester City	v	Sunderland	Leicester
15:00 BST				Stadium: King Power Stadium

8 May 2027 22	Sunderland	v	Watford	Sunderland
01:00 BST				Stadium: Stadium of Light

=== FA Cup ===
Sunderland will enter the FA Cup in the Third Round Proper with ties to be played on 13th December 2026.

=== League Cup ===
==== League stage ====
Pos	Grp	Team	Pld	W	PW	PL	L	GF	GA	GD	Pts
9	SR	Crystal Palace	5	2	1	0	2	9	8	+1	8
10	NR	Birmingham City	5	2	0	1	2	12	8	+4	7
11	NR	Sunderland	4	2	0	0	2	5	7	−2	6
12	SR	Charlton Athletic	5	2	0	0	3	4	9	−5	6
13	SR	Southampton	4	1	0	2	1	6	7	−1	5

Updated to match(es) played on 18 November 2026. Source: WSL Football
Rules for classification: 1) Points; 2) Goal difference; 3) Number of goals scored; 4) Number of wins; 5) Head-to-head record

23 September 2026 League Stage	Liverpool	4-2	Sunderland	St Helens
19:00 BST	Shaw 23'; Höbinger 47', 56'; Ramos 55'	Report	Paxton 44'; Parker 45+2'	Stadium: BrewDog Stadium; Attendance: 1,717; Referee: Aimee Keir

18 October 2026 League Stage	Newcastle United	0-1	Sunderland	Gateshead
14:00 BST	Lambert (yellow card) 22'; Antonsdóttir (yellow card) 36'; Thomas (penalty missed) 65'; Gregory (yellow card) 87'	Report	Dent (yellow card) 32'; Kitching 49'	Stadium: Gateshead International Stadium; Attendance: 2,773; Referee: Melissa Burgin

1 November 2026 League Stage	Sunderland	1-0	Sheffield United	Hetton-le-Hole
14:00 GMT	Paxton 65'; Missipo (yellow card) 84'	Report	Reavill (yellow card) 54'	Stadium: Eppleton CW; Attendance: 330; Referee: Hannah Gardner

11 November 2026 League Stage	Birmingham City	3-1	Sunderland	Bordesley
19:00 GMT	Crosthwaite 40'; Holloway 69'; Leidhammar 82'	Report	Parker 44'	Stadium: St Andrew's Stadium; Attendance: 281; Referee: Aimee Keir

22 November 2026 League Stage	Sunderland	v	Burnley	Hetton-le-Hole
14:00 GMT				Stadium: Eppleton CW

16 December 2026 League Stage	Sunderland	v	Everton	Hetton-le-Hole
19:00 GMT				Stadium: Eppleton CW

== Statistics ==
Italics indicate a loaned in player.

=== Appearances ===
As of 15 November 2026

Starting appearances are listed first, followed by substitute appearances after the + symbol where applicable.

No.	Pos	Nat	Player	Total		WSL2		FA Cup		League Cup	
No.	Pos	Nat	Player	Apps	Goals	Apps	Goals	Apps	Goals	Apps	Goals
1	GK	(England) ENG	Fran Stenson	8	0	8	0	0	0	0	0
2	DF	(England) ENG	Ria Bose	6	0	0+3	0	0	0	3	0
3	DF	(England) ENG	Mary Corbyn	11	0	3+4	0	0	0	4	0
5	DF	(Wales) WAL	Rhiannon Roberts	4	1	4	1	0	0	0	0
6	DF	(Wales) WAL	Tara Bourne	6	0	6	0	0	0	0	0
7	FW	(England) ENG	Katy Watson	10	3	7	3	0	0	1+2	0
8	FW	(England) ENG	Emily Scarr	11	0	1+6	0	0	0	3+1	0
9	FW	(Wales) WAL	Elise Hughes	11	5	8	5	0	0	1+2	0
10	MF	(New Zealand) NZL	Katie Kitching	12	4	8	3	0	0	3+1	1
11	DF	(England) ENG	Jessica Brown	9	0	7	0	0	0	0+2	0
12	MF	(Northern Ireland) NIR	Emily Cassap	2	0	0	0	0	0	2	0
14	MF	(England) ENG	Natasha Fenton	10	0	1+5	0	0	0	4	0
16	FW	(Finland) FIN	Sanni Franssi	12	3	7+1	3	0	0	3+1	0
17	DF	(Republic of Ireland) IRL	Izzy Atkinson	0	0	0	0	0	0	0	0
18	GK	(United States) USA	Noa Schumacher	4	0	0	0	0	0	4	0
19	FW	(England) ENG	Lily Dent	2	0	0+1	0	0	0	1	0
20	MF	(Jamaica) JAM	Atlanta Primus	10	0	7+1	0	0	0	0+2	0
21	MF	(Republic of Ireland) IRL	Marissa Sheva	9	1	1+4	1	0	0	3+1	0
23	MF	(Belgium) BEL	Kassandra Missipo	11	0	8	0	0	0	0+3	0
27	DF	(Scotland) SCO	Brianna Westrup	6	0	2	0	0	0	4	0
31	DF	(England) ENG	Chloe Paxton	11	2	4+3	0	0	0	3+1	2
33	FW	(England) ENG	Ella Parker	4	2	0+1	0	0	0	3	2
35	DF	(England) ENG	Eva Bewicke	2	0	0	0	0	0	1+1	0
36	GK	(England) ENG	Jenny Blench	0	0	0	0	0	0	0	0
77	DF	(France) FRA	Tess Laplacette	10	0	6+2	0	0	0	1+1	0

=== Goalscorers ===
As of 15 November 2026

Rnk	No	Pos	Nat	Name	WSL2	FA Cup	League Cup	Total
1	9	FW	(Wales)	Elise Hughes	5	0	0	5
2	10	MF	(New Zealand)	Katie Kitching	3	0	1	4
3	7	FW	(England)	Katy Watson	3	0	0	3
3	16	FW	(England)	Sanni Franssi	3	0	0	3
5	31	DF	(England)	Chloe Paxton	0	0	2	2
5	33	FW	(England)	Ella Parker	0	0	2	2
7	5	DF	(Wales)	Rhiannon Roberts	1	0	0	1
7	21	MF	(Republic of Ireland)	Marissa Sheva	1	0	0	1
Total					16	0	5	21

=== Assists ===
As of 15 November 2026

Rnk	No	Pos	Nat	Name	WSL2	FA Cup	League Cup	Total
1	7	FW	(England)	Katy Watson	3	0	1	4
2	10	MF	(New Zealand)	Katie Kitching	2	0	1	3
3	11	DF	(England)	Jessica Brown	2	0	0	2
3	77	DF	(France)	Tess Laplacette	2	0	0	2
5	8	FW	(England)	Emily Scarr	1	0	0	1
5	14	MF	(England)	Natasha Fenton	1	0	0	1
5	20	MF	(Jamaica)	Atlanta Primus	1	0	0	1
5	27	DF	(Scotland)	Brianna Westrup	0	0	1	1
Total					12	0	3	15

=== Clean sheets ===
As of 15 November 2026

Rank	No.	Pos.	Nat.	Player	Matches played	Clean sheet %	WSL2	FA Cup	League Cup	Total
1	1	GK	(England)	Fran Stenson	8	25.00%	2	0	0	2
1	18	GK	(United States)	Noa Schumacher	4	50.00%	0	0	2	2
Totals					12	33.33%	2	0	2	4

=== Disciplinary record ===
As of 15 November 2026

No.	Pos.	Nat.	Player	WSL2			FA Cup			League Cup			Total		
No.	Pos.	Nat.	Player	Yellow card	(yellow card) (yellow-red card)	Red card	Yellow card	(yellow card) (yellow-red card)	Red card	Yellow card	(yellow card) (yellow-red card)	Red card	Yellow card	(yellow card) (yellow-red card)	Red card
3	DF	(England)	Mary Corbyn	3	0	0	0	0	0	0	0	0	3	0	0
6	DF	(Wales)	Tara Bourne	1	0	0	0	0	0	0	0	0	1	0	0
8	FW	(England)	Emily Scarr	1	0	0	0	0	0	0	0	0	1	0	0
10	MF	(New Zealand)	Katie Kitching	1	0	0	0	0	0	0	0	0	1	0	0
11	DF	(England)	Jessica Brown	3	0	0	0	0	0	0	0	0	3	0	0
19	FW	(England)	Lily Dent	1	0	0	0	0	0	1	0	0	2	0	0
20	MF	(Jamaica)	Atlanta Primus	2	0	0	0	0	0	0	0	0	2	0	0
23	MF	(Belgium)	Kassandra Missipo	1	0	0	0	0	0	1	0	0	2	0	0
77	DF	(France)	Tess Laplacette	1	0	1	0	0	0	0	0	0	1	0	1
Total				14	0	1	0	0	0	2	0	0	16	0	1
