= Tara Bourne =

Welsh footballer (born 2003)

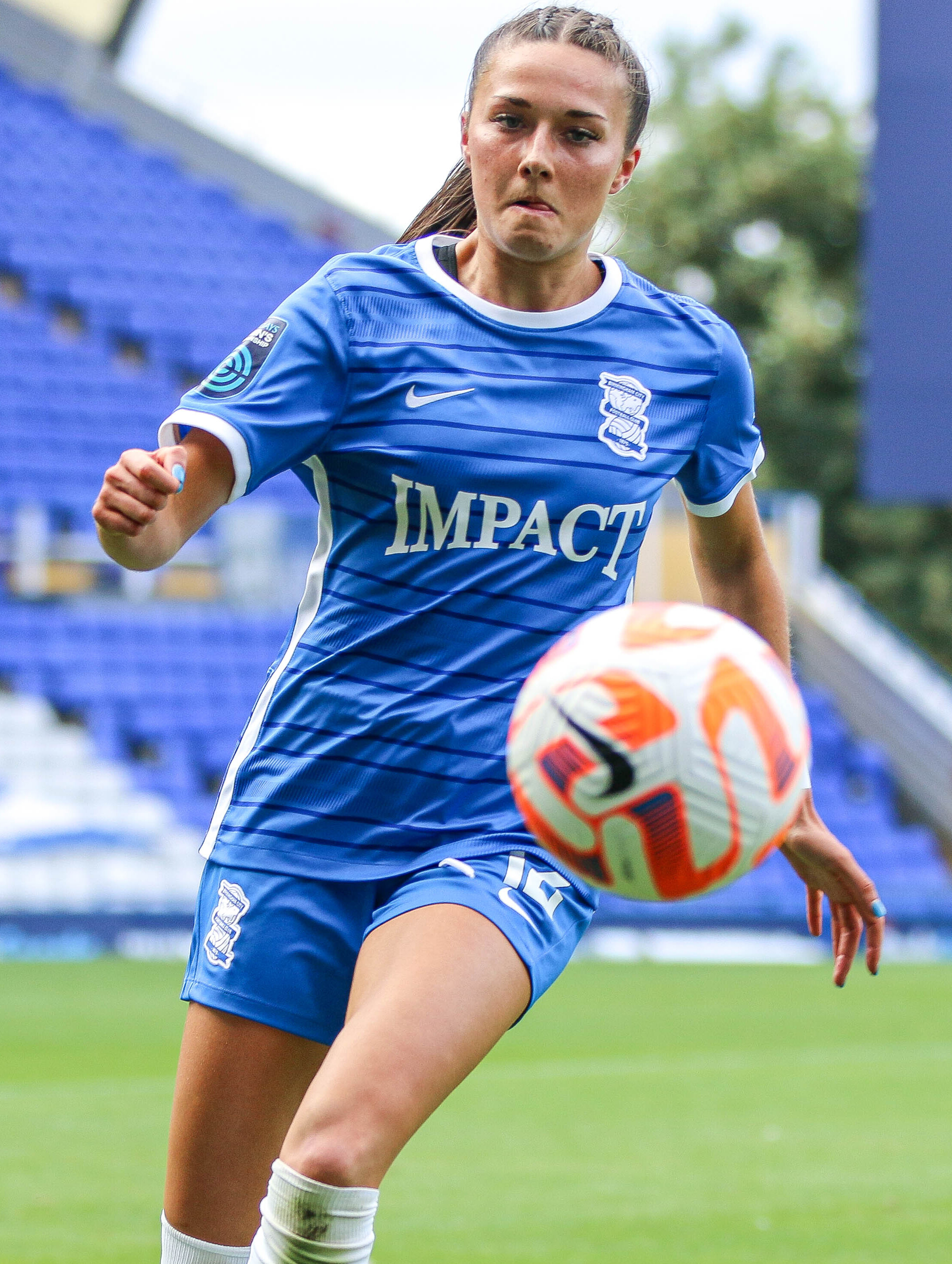
- Bourne playing for Birmingham City in 2022

Personal information
- Full name: Tara Kelly Bourne
- Date of birth: 17 July 2003 (age 23)
- Place of birth: Cheshire, England
- Position: Defender

Team information
- Current team: Sunderland
- Number: 6

Youth career
- Sandbach United
- Manchester City
- Liverpool
- Manchester United

Senior career*
Years	Team	Apps	(Gls)
2021–2023	Manchester United	0	(0)
2021–2022	→ Sheffield United (loan)	9	(0)
2022	→ Blackburn Rovers (loan)	6	(0)
2022–2023	→ Birmingham City (loan)	15	(1)
2023–2024	Sheffield United	21	(3)
2024–2026	Southampton	41	(3)
2026–	Sunderland	6	(0)

International career^{‡}
2017–2018	England U15		
2019–2020	England U17		
2021–2022	England U19	7	(0)
2022–2025	England U23	5	(0)
- * Club domestic league appearances and goals as of 25 October 2026 ‡ National team caps and goals as of 11:06, 4 December 2024

Tara Kelly Bourne (born 17 July 2003) is a professional footballer who plays as a defender for Women's Super League 2 club Sunderland. She previously played for Manchester United, Blackburn Rovers, Birmingham City, Sheffield United and Southampton. Born in England, she committed to play for the Wales women's national team.

== Club career ==
Bourne moved from the Liverpool U21 academy to join the Manchester United U21 academy during the 2019–20 season. She made her senior debut for United in April 2021 in an FA Cup fourth round tie against Burnley, entering as a 59th-minute substitute during the 6–0 win.

In August 2021, Bourne signed her first professional contract with the club and was sent out on a season-long loan with Sheffield United of the Championship. She made 12 appearances in all competitions for United before the loan was terminated early in January 2022 and Bourne joined fellow Championship side Blackburn Rovers for the remainder of the 2021–22 season.

In August 2022, Bourne joined newly relegated Championship side Birmingham City on loan for the 2022–23 season. She made 18 appearances in all competitions and scored her first senior goal on 19 April 2023 in a 1–0 league win over Durham. On 30 June 2023, it was announced Bourne had departed Manchester United following the conclusion of the season.

On 2 August 2023, Bourne rejoined Sheffield United on a permanent transfer.

On 9 July 2024, Bourne signed for Women's Championship club Southampton.

On 6 July 2026, it was announced that Bourne signed with Women's Super League 2 club Sunderland on a two-year contract and would wear the number 6 shirt.

== International career ==
Internationally, Bourne made three appearances for England under-19 during 2022 UEFA Under-19 Championship qualification and was named to the squad for the final tournament, making a further three appearances at 2022 UEFA Under-19 Championship.

In August 2022, she was named to the England under-23 squad to play in a friendly against Norway, where she was a used substitute. On 22 November 2022, Bourne made her first appearance for the team as a 71st-minute substitute, preventing Italy from scoring with a block on the goal line for a 0–0 draw. On 30 October 2023, she made her first start for the under-23s in the new European U23 League against Portugal during a 2–0 victory.

On 12 November 2026, Bourne's request to switch her international allegiance to Wales was approved by FIFA.

== Career statistics ==
=== Club ===
As of match played 25 October 2026

Appearances and goals by club, season and competition
Club	Season	League			FA Cup		WSL Players Cup		Total	
Club	Season	Division	Apps	Goals	Apps	Goals	Apps	Goals	Apps	Goals
Manchester United	2020–21	Women's Super League	0	0	1	0	0	0	1	0
Manchester United	2021–22	Women's Super League	0	0	0	0	0	0	0	0
Manchester United	2022–23	Women's Super League	0	0	0	0	0	0	0	0
Manchester United	Total		0	0	1	0	0	0	1	0
Sheffield United (loan)	2021–22	Championship	9	0	0	0	3	0	12	0
Blackburn Rovers (loan)	2021–22	Championship	6	0	1	0	0	0	7	0
Birmingham City (loan)	2022–23	Championship	15	1	2	0	1	0	18	1
Sheffield United	2023–24	Championship	21	3	2	0	1	1	24	4
Southampton	2024–25	Championship	19	1	0	0	2	0	21	1
Southampton	2025–26	Women's Super League 2	22	2	1	0	3	0	26	2
Southampton	Total		41	3	1	0	5	0	47	3
Sunderland	2026–27	Women's Super League 2	6	0	0	0	0	0	6	0
Career total			98	7	7	0	10	1	115	8
