= 2015 FA WSL 1 =

Fifth season of the top English women's association football league

FA WSL 1
- Season: 2015
- Champions: Chelsea (1st WSL title)
- Relegated: Bristol Academy
- Champions League: Chelsea; Manchester City
- Matches: 56
- Goals: 154 (2.75 per match)
- Top goalscorer: Beth Mead (12 goals)
- Biggest home win: Manchester City 6–1 Bristol Academy (27 September 2015)
- Biggest away win: Bristol Academy 0–4 Chelsea (2 April 2015); Liverpool 0–4 Chelsea (27 September 2015)
- Highest scoring: Bristol Academy 2–5 Notts County (25 April 2015); Manchester City 6–1 Bristol Academy (27 September 2015)
- Longest winning run: 5 matches Chelsea
- Longest unbeaten run: 10 matches Manchester City
- Longest winless run: 9 matches Bristol Academy
- Longest losing run: 4 matches Bristol Academy; Liverpool
- Highest attendance: 3,180; Manchester City 2–1 Notts County (4 October 2015)
- Total attendance: 57,253
- Average attendance: 1,022
- All statistics correct as of 5 October 2015.

The 2015 FA WSL 1 was the fifth season of the FA WSL, the top-level women's football league of England. The season was played from 25 March to 4 October.

Liverpool were the defending champions from the 2014 FA WSL. Chelsea became the title winners and together with Manchester City (who finished as runners-up) qualified for the 2016–17 UEFA Women's Champions League.

This was the second season since the WSL 2 was introduced. As part of a two-year expansion plan, the WSL 1 will increase to nine teams for the 2016 season. By the end of the 2015 season two teams (Reading and Doncaster Rovers Belles) were promoted from WSL 2 to WSL 1 and only one team (Bristol Academy) relegated to WSL 2, with one team being promoted from Premier League to WSL 2.

Sunderland earned promotion last season after they won WSL 2 and met off-field licensing requirements. Everton were relegated.

== Background ==
In December 2014, the FA WSL announced a two-year plan to expand WSL 1 from an eight to 10-team league. Two teams will be promoted from WSL 2, while one team will be relegated to WSL 2. Also, for the first time, a team from the FA Women's Premier League earned promotion to WSL 2, effectively connecting the WSL to the rest of the English women's football pyramid.

This will leave WSL 1 with nine teams and WSL 2 with 10 teams for the 2016 season, and with the process repeated the following year, both WSL 1 and WSL 2 will have 10 teams each for the 2017 season.

== Teams ==
Locations of the 2015 Super League teams

Team	Location	Ground	Capacity	2014 WSL 1 finish
Arsenal	Borehamwood	Meadow Park	4,502 (1,400 seated)	4th
Birmingham City	Solihull	Damson Park	3,050 (280 seated)	3rd
Bristol Academy	Filton	Stoke Gifford Stadium	1,500	7th
Chelsea	Staines	Wheatsheaf Park	3,009 (300 seated and 800 covered)	2nd
Manchester City	Manchester	Academy Stadium	7,000 (5,000 seated)	5th
Liverpool	Widnes	Halton Stadium	13,350	1st
Notts County	Nottingham	Meadow Lane	20,229	6th
Sunderland	Hetton-le-Hole	Eppleton Colliery Welfare Ground	2,500	1st (WSL 2)

== Transfers ==
As of 27 July 2015

Arrivals

Arsenal
Player	Position	From	Ref.
(England) Lianne Sanderson	FW	Boston Breakers	
(Spain) Natalia Pablos	FW	Bristol Academy	
(England) Jemma Rose	DF	Bristol Academy	
(Spain) Vicky Losada	MF	Barcelona	
(United States) Chioma Ubogagu	FW	Stanford University	
(Spain) Marta Corredera	MF	Barcelona	
(Netherlands) Dominique Janssen	DF	SGS Essen	
(Netherlands) Sari van Veenendaal	GK	FC Twente	

Birmingham City
Player	Position	From	Ref.
(England) Alex Windell	MF	Bristol Academy	
(England) Freda Ayisi	FW	Arsenal	

Bristol Academy
Player	Position	From	Ref.
(Australia) Isobel Dalton	MF	Brisbane Roar	
(Wales) Hayley Ladd	MF	Coventry United	
(Wales) Nadia Lawrence	FW	ÍBV	
(Wales) Sharla Passariello	FW	South Florida Bulls	
(Wales) Lauren Townsend	DF	Cardiff City Ladies	
(Scotland) Christie Murray	MF	unattached	
(Scotland) Caroline Weir	MF	Arsenal	
(England) Hannah Short	DF	East Tennessee State University	
(Scotland) Hannah Reid	GK	Hibernian	
(Bulgaria) Evdokiya Popadiynova	FW	NSA Sofia	
(Equatorial Guinea) Jade Boho	FW	Rayo Vallecano	
(Netherlands) Marije Brummel	DF	Apollon Limassol	
(Portugal) Tatiana Pinto	MF	SC Sand	

Chelsea
Player	Position	From	Ref.
(England) Gemma Davison	MF	Liverpool	
(England) Millie Bright	MF	Doncaster Rovers Belles	
(Republic of Ireland) Niamh Fahey	DF	Arsenal	
(Sweden) Hedvig Lindahl	GK	Kristianstads DFF	
(Sweden) Marija Banušić	FW	Kristianstads DFF	
(England) Fran Kirby	FW	Reading	

Liverpool
Player	Position	From	Ref.
(United States) Satara Murray	DF	University of North Carolina	
(Norway) Ingrid Ryland	DF	Arna-Bjørnar	
(Norway) Line Krogedal Smørsgård	FW	Klepp IL	
(Nigeria) Asisat Oshoala	FW	Rivers Angels	
(New Zealand) Rosie White	FW	University of California LA	

Manchester City
Player	Position	From	Ref.
(England) Lucy Bronze	DF	Liverpool	
(Scotland) Jen Beattie	DF	Montpellier	
(England) Nikita Parris	FW	Everton (on loan)	
(England) Demi Stokes	DF	University of South Florida	
(Wales) Sarah Wiltshire	FW	Yeovil Town	
(Wales) Natasha Harding*	FW	Bristol Academy	
(United States) Daphne Corboz	MF	Georgetown University	

Notts County
Player	Position	From	Ref.
(England) Rachel Williams	FW	Chelsea	
(England) Laura Bassett	DF	Chelsea	
(England) Alex Greenwood	DF	Everton	
(England) Jessica Sigsworth	FW	Doncaster Rovers Belles	
(England) Fern Whelan	DF	Everton	
(England) Danielle Buet	MF	Chelsea	
(Scotland) Leanne Crichton	MF	Glasgow City	
(England) Siobhan Chamberlain	GK	Arsenal (on loan)	
(England) Danielle Hill	GK	Doncaster Rovers Belles	

Sunderland
Player	Position	From	Ref.
(Northern Ireland) Alice Harkness	GK	Glentoran Belfast United	
(England) Victoria Williams	DF	Doncaster Rovers Belles	
(Scotland) Suzanne Mulvey	FW	Rangers	
(England) Brooke Chaplen	MF	Everton	
(Republic of Ireland) Stephanie Roche	FW	unattached	
(Norway) Hilde Gunn Olsen	GK	Arna-Bjørnar	

Departures

Arsenal
Player	Position	To	Ref.
(Scotland) Christie Murray	MF	end of contract	
(Japan) Yukari Kinga	DF	INAC Kobe Leonessa	
(Japan) Shinobu Ohno	FW	INAC Kobe Leonessa	
(England) Freda Ayisi	FW	Birmingham City	
(England) Lianne Sanderson	FW	unattached	
(Republic of Ireland) Niamh Fahey	DF	Chelsea	
(Scotland) Caroline Weir	MF	Bristol Academy	
(England) Siobhan Chamberlain	GK	Notts County (on loan)	

Birmingham City
Player	Position	To	Ref.
(England) Abbeyleigh Stringer	DF	Aston Villa	

Bristol Academy
Player	Position	To	Ref.
(England) Corinne Yorston	DF	Yeovil Town	
(Spain) Natalia Pablos	FW	Arsenal	
(England) Jemma Rose	DF	Arsenal	
(England) Alex Windell	MF	Birmingham City	
(Wales) Natasha Harding*	FW	Manchester City	
(Spain) Laura del Río	FW	Washington Spirit	
(Australia) Isobel Dalton	MF	Lindsey Wilson College (Kentucky, USA)	
(Northern Ireland) Alexandra Hurst	MF	Swindon Town	
(Wales) Alice Evans	GK	Yeovil Town	
(England) Nicola Watts	FW	Reading	

Chelsea
Player	Position	To	Ref.
(Japan) Yūki Ōgimi	FW	Wolfsburg	
(England) Rachel Williams	FW	Notts County	
(England) Laura Bassett	DF	Notts County	
(England) Danielle Buet	MF	Notts County	
(England) Rosella Ayane	FW	Millwall Lionesses (on loan)	
(Netherlands) Jackie Groenen	MF	1. FFC Frankfurt	

Liverpool
Player	Position	To	Ref.
(United States) Amanda DaCosta	MF	Washington Spirit	
(Denmark) Nina Frausing Pedersen	DF	1. FFC Turbine Potsdam	
(England) Megan Alexander	DF	Everton	
(England) Ellie Stewart	DF	Everton	
(England) Gemma Davison	MF	Chelsea	
(England) Lucy Bronze	DF	Manchester City	
(Germany) Nicole Rolser	MF	Bayern Munich	

Manchester City
Player	Position	To	Ref.
(England) Danielle Young	FW	Everton	
(England) Danielle Lea	DF	Everton	
(Wales) Sarah Wiltshire	FW	Yeovil Town	

Notts County
Player	Position	To	Ref.
(Australia) Danielle Brogan	DF	Adelaide United	
(Scotland) Rachel Corsie	DF	Seattle Reign	
(England) Emily Roberts	MF	Doncaster Rovers Belles (on loan)	
(New Zealand) Katie Duncan-Hoyle	MF	FC Zürich	

Sunderland
Player	Position	To	Ref.
(England) Helen Alderson	GK	Durham	
(England) Natalie Gutteridge	FW	Durham	

* Natasha Harding was supposed to join American team Washington Spirit, as she was denied a visa, she joined Manchester City instead.

== Table ==
Pos	Team	Pld	W	D	L	GF	GA	GD	Pts	Qualification or relegation
1	Chelsea (C)	14	10	2	2	30	10	+20	32	Qualification for the Champions League knockout phase
2	Manchester City	14	9	3	2	25	11	+14	30	Qualification for the Champions League knockout phase
3	Arsenal	14	8	3	3	21	13	+8	27	
4	Sunderland	14	6	2	6	24	24	0	20	
5	Notts County	14	4	3	7	20	20	0	15	
6	Birmingham City	14	3	4	7	7	14	−7	13	
7	Liverpool	14	4	1	9	15	24	−9	13	
8	Bristol Academy (R)	14	2	2	10	12	38	−26	8	Relegation to the FA WSL 2

Source: FA WSL
Rules for classification: 1) Points; 2) Goal difference; 3) Number of goals scored
(C) Champions; (R) Relegated

== Results ==
Home \ Away	ARS	BIR	BRI	CHE	LIV	MCI	NTC	SUN
Arsenal		1–0	2–0	0–2	1–3	2–3	2–1	4–1
Birmingham City	0–1		0–0	0–1	1–0	0–0	0–0	1–1
Bristol Academy	1–1	0–3		0–4	4–2	0–3	2–5	1–4
Chelsea	0–0	4–0	4–1		1–0	1–2	2–1	4–0
Liverpool	0–2	2–1	2–0	0–4		2–1	1–2	1–2
Manchester City	0–1	1–0	6–1	1–1	2–0		2–1	1–0
Notts County	1–1	0–1	0–1	1–2	1–0	2–2		4–2
Sunderland	1–3	3–0	2–1	4–0	2–2	0–1	2–1	

Updated to match(es) played on 4 October 2015. Source: FA WSL
Legend: Blue = home team win; Yellow = draw; Red = away team win.

== Top goalscorers ==
As of 5 October 2015

Rank	Player	Team	Goals
1	(England) Beth Mead	Sunderland	12
2	(England) Jess Clarke	Notts County	7
2	(Spain) Natalia Pablos	Arsenal	7
4	(England) Eniola Aluko	Chelsea	6
4	(England) Isobel Christiansen	Manchester City	6
4	(England) Gemma Davison	Chelsea	6
4	(England) Toni Duggan	Manchester City	6
4	(England) Chioma Ubogagu	Arsenal	6
4	(England) Rachel Williams	Notts County	6
10	(England) Karen Carney	Birmingham City	5
10	(South Korea) Ji So-yun	Chelsea	5

== See also ==
- 2015 FA WSL Cup
- 2015 FA WSL 2
