= Marissa Sheva =

Irish footballer (born 1997)

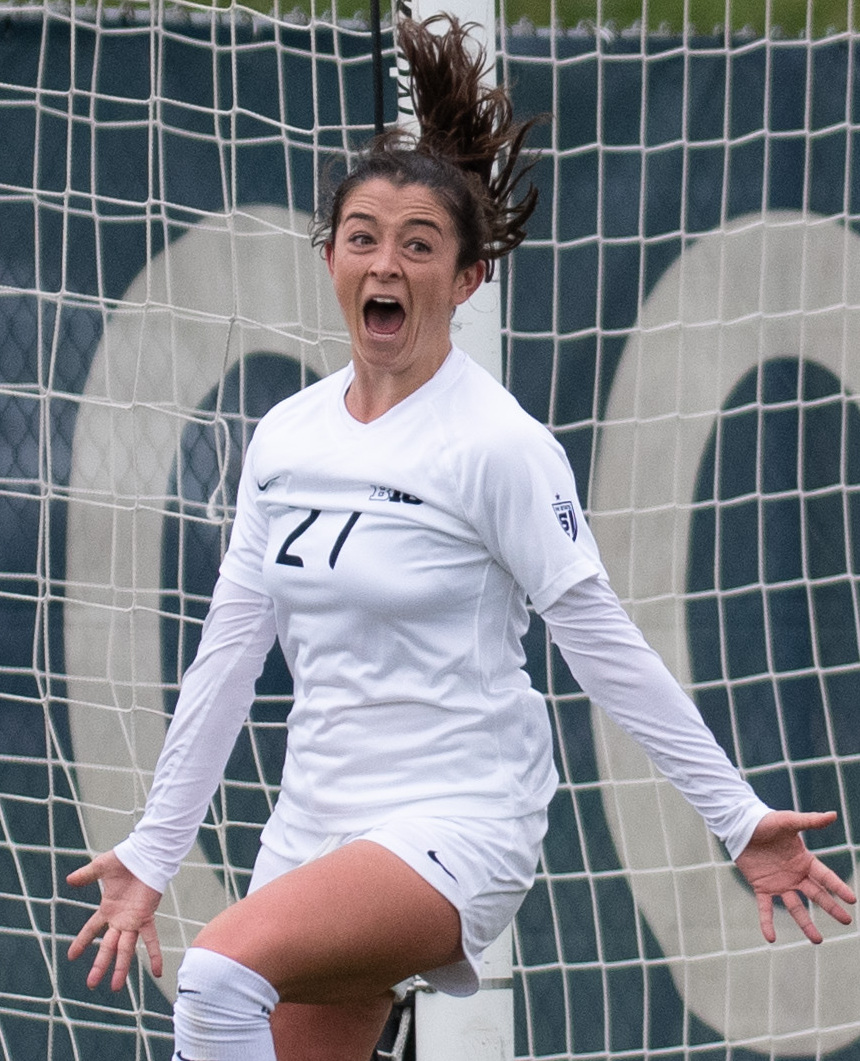
- Sheva with Penn State in 2018

Personal information
- Full name: Marissa Maeve Sheva
- Date of birth: 22 April 1997 (age 29)
- Place of birth: Sellersville, Pennsylvania, U.S.
- Height: 5 ft 3 in (1.60 m)
- Position: Forward

Team information
- Current team: Sunderland
- Number: 21

Youth career
- Penn Fusion

College career
Years	Team	Apps	(Gls)
2015–2018	Penn State Nittany Lions	92	(13)

Senior career*
Years	Team	Apps	(Gls)
2020	Deportivo Alavés Gloriosas	1	(0)
2020	Utah Royals	0	(0)
2022–2023	Washington Spirit	18	(0)
2024	Portland Thorns	6	(0)
2025–	Sunderland	27	(2)

International career^{‡}
2023–	Republic of Ireland	27	(5)
- * Club domestic league appearances and goals as of 15 November 2026 ‡ National team caps and goals as of 18 October 2026

Marissa Maeve Sheva (born 22 April 1997) is a professional footballer who most plays as a forward for the Sunderland in the Women's Championship. Born and raised in the United States to an American father and an Irish-American mother, she is capped for the Republic of Ireland women's national team.

== High School ==
Sheva graduated from Pennridge High School. While she was in high school, she was a state champion in the 1600m and 3200m. She competed at Foot Locker Cross Country Nationals

== College career ==
Sheva played college soccer at Pennsylvania State University and as a freshman was a 2015 NCAA Division I women's soccer tournament champion. She was a two-sport athlete and despite concluding her soccer career in 2018 with 13 goals in 92 appearances, she did not enter the 2019 NWSL College Draft due to finishing her track commitments.

== Club career ==
Sheva joined Deportivo Alavés Gloriosas of Spain's Segunda División Pro in February 2020. After a single 11-minute substitute appearance, she left shortly afterwards to attend Utah Royals FC's preseason training camp. She was signed on as a rookie ahead of the 2020 NWSL Challenge Cup.

Hip surgery ruled Sheva out of the 2021 season, but she joined Washington Spirit during their 2022 season. Initially signed as a short-term COVID-19 replacement player, she was later reclassified as an injury replacement player, then a national team replacement player, before being given an active roster slot in August 2022. After making eight NWSL appearances (three starts) in 2022, she was given a new one-year professional contract by the club in November of that year.

On 14 March 2024, it was announced that Sheva signed joined the Portland Thorns on a one-year contract with a mutual second year option.

On 26 March 2025, it was announced that Sheva had joined English club Sunderland.

== International career ==
Sheva alerted the Football Association of Ireland to her eligibility for the Republic of Ireland women's national football team and was called up to a training camp in Marbella in February 2023. Her maternal grandparents came from County Donegal and County Tyrone. Sheva won her first cap as a half-time substitute for Abbie Larkin in a 0–0 friendly draw with China, staged at Estadio Nuevo Mirador, Algeciras, on 22 February 2023.

In April 2023 Sheva started Ireland's next two fixtures, both against the United States. Sheva played on the left wing, having made her debut on the right wing. Although beaten in both games, the performance of the team and Sheva individually were viewed as encouraging by coach Pauw ahead of the 2023 FIFA Women's World Cup.

== Career statistics ==
=== Club ===
As of match played 15 November 2026

Appearances and goals by club, season and competition
ClubLeague Cup	Season	League			National Cup (Note: Includes NWSL Challenge Cup and Women's FA Cup)		League Cup		Playoffs (Note: Includes NWSL Playoffs)		Other		Total	
ClubLeague Cup	Season	Division	Apps	Goals	Apps	Goals	Apps	Goals	Apps	Goals	Apps	Goals	Apps	Goals
Deportivo Alavés Gloriosas	2019–20	Segunda División Pro	1	0	—		—		—		—		1	0
Utah Royals FC	2020	NWSL	—		0	0	—		—		0 (Note: Includes the NWSL Fall Series)	0	0	0
Washington Spirit	2022	NWSL	8	0	0	0	—		—		—		8	0
Washington Spirit	2023	NWSL	10	0	3	1	—		—		—		13	1
Washington Spirit	Total		18	0	3	1	—		0	0	0	0	21	1
Portland Thorns FC	2024	NWSL	6	0	0	0	—		—		—		6	0
Sunderland	2024–25	Women's Championship	3	0	0	0	0	0	—		—		3	0
Sunderland	2025–26	Women's Super League 2	19	1	1	0	2	0	—		0	0	22	1
Sunderland	2026–27	Women's Super League 2	5	1	0	0	4	0	—		0	0	9	1
Sunderland	Total		27	2	1	0	6	0	—		0	0	34	2
Career total			52	2	4	1	6	0	0	0	0	0	62	3

=== International ===
As of match played 13 October 2026

Appearances and goals by national team and year
National team	Year	Apps	Goals
Republic of Ireland	2023	7	0
Republic of Ireland	2024	3	1
Republic of Ireland	2025	10	2
Republic of Ireland	2026	7	2
Total		27	5

=== International goals ===
No.	Date	Venue	Opponent	Score	Result	Competition
1.	25 October 2024	Mikheil Meskhi Stadium, Tbilisi, Georgia	Georgia	5–0	6–0	UEFA Women's Euro 2025 qualifying play-offs
2.	4 April 2025	Theodoros Vardinogiannis Stadium, Heraklion, Greece	Greece	1–0	4–0	2025 UEFA Women's Nations League
3.	24 October 2025	Aviva Stadium, Dublin, Ireland	Belgium	4–1	4–2	2025 UEFA Nations League play-offs
4.	14 April 2026	Gdańsk Stadium, Gdańsk, Poland	Poland	3–1	3–2	2027 FIFA Women's World Cup qualification
5.	18 April 2026	Aviva Stadium, Dublin, Ireland	Poland	1–0	1–0	2027 FIFA Women's World Cup qualification

== Honors ==
Penn State Nittany Lions

- NCAA Division I Women's Soccer Championship: 2015
