= Kassandra Missipo =

Belgian footballer

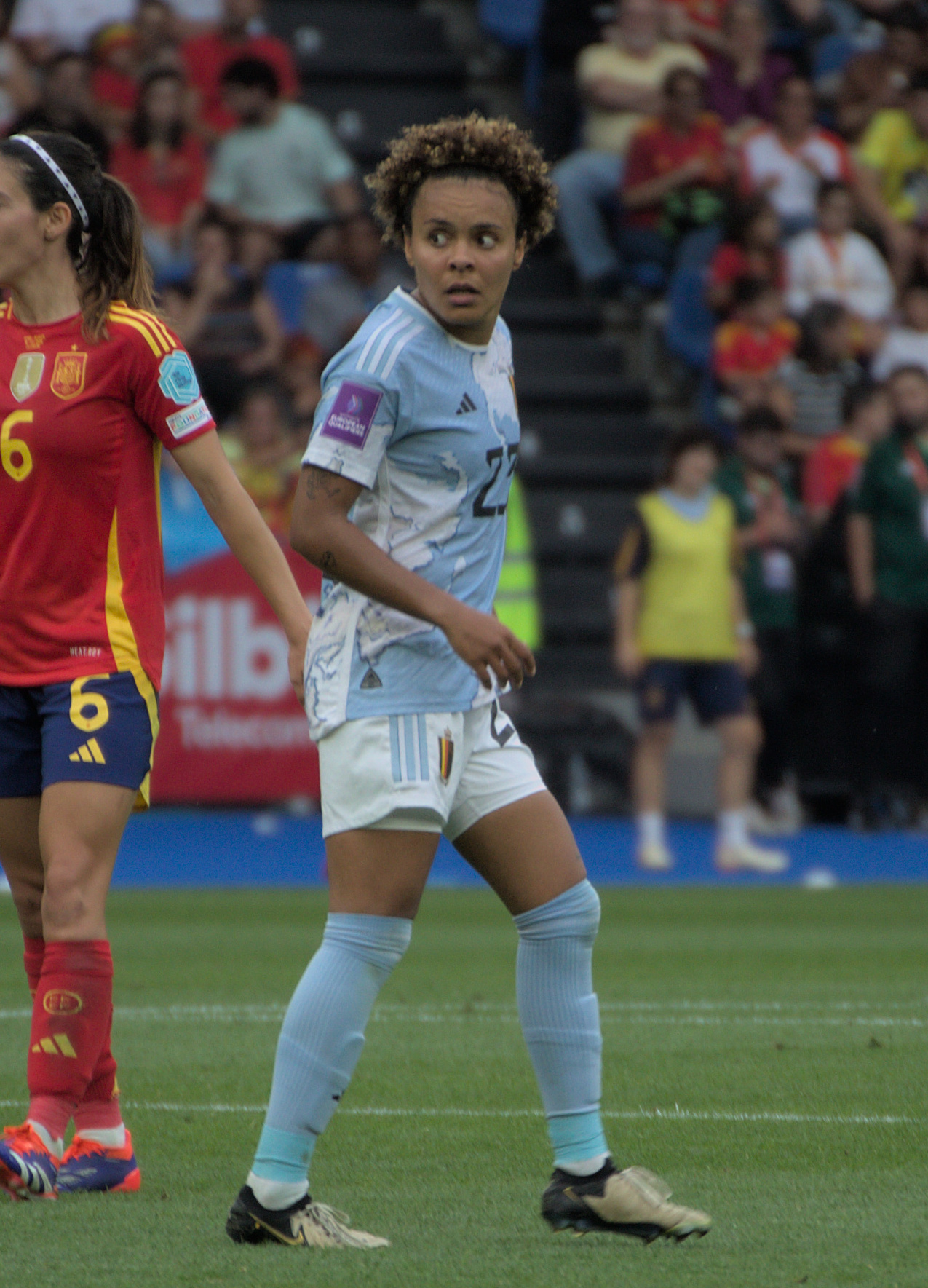
- Missipo in 2024

Personal information
- Full name: Kassandra Ndoutou Eboa Missipo
- Date of birth: 3 February 1998 (age 28)
- Place of birth: Asse, Belgium
- Height: 1.59 m (5 ft 3 in)
- Position: Midfielder

Team information
- Current team: Sunderland
- Number: 23

Youth career
- 2003–2012: KSK Beveren
- 2012–2013: Herleving Vrasene
- 2013–2015: TK Meldert

Senior career*
Years	Team	Apps	(Gls)
2015–2020	Gent		
2020–2021	Anderlecht	22	(2)
2022–2023	Basel	22	(4)
2023–2026	Sassuolo	67	(6)
2026–	Sunderland	8	(0)

International career^{‡}
2014–2015	Belgium U17	6	(0)
2015–2017	Belgium U19	12	(2)
2016–	Belgium	78	(3)
- * Club domestic league appearances and goals as of 15 November 2026 ‡ National team caps and goals as of 14 April 2026

Kassandra Ndoutou Eboa Missipo (born 3 February 1998) is a Belgian footballer who plays as a midfielder for Women's Super League 2 (WSL2) club Sunderland and the Belgium national team.

== Club career ==
From the town of Asse, just west of Brussels, and born to a Cameroonian father, Kassandra Missipo started playing in the youth teams of VC Terheide and Thor Kokerij Meldert. In 2015, at the age of 17, Missipo moved to Gent, where she played for five consecutive seasons. In the blue jersey of the Flemish team, she made her debut in the Super League, going on to win the Belgian Cup twice in 2017 and 2019. She was named the best player of the Super League in 2019.

A year later, Missipo left Gent for Anderlecht, winners of the previous three national championships. With Anderlecht, she won her first league title in 2021, also having the opportunity to play in an international club competition, debuting in the first qualifying round of the 2020–21 UEFA Women's Champions League, winning 8–0 against Northern Irish club Linfield, losing in the second round 2–1 to Portuguese side SL Benfica. A torn cruciate ligament at the end of the season kept her out of action for several months, missing the following season as well.

On 18 May 2022, it was announced that Missipo would officially join FC Basel Frauen in the Swiss Super League for the 2022–23 season. A sixth-placed finish saw Basel qualify for the play-offs, losing in the quarter-finals 4–0 on aggregate to Grasshoppers.

After one year with Basel, Missipo was officially signed on a permanent basis by Sassuolo in Serie A Femminile in August 2023, and after helping the club to fourth – their joint second-best performance ever – she renewed her contract with the club for another season in June 2024.

On 12 August 2026, Missipo was announced at Sunderland.

== International career ==
Missipo has been capped for the Belgium national team, appearing for the team during the 2019 FIFA Women's World Cup qualifying cycle.

Missipo was part of the Belgian youth teams, playing three matches with the Under-16 team, seven with the Under-17 team and fifteen with the Under-19 team, taking to the field in the qualifying matches for the final stages of the European Championships in the category.

On 3 June 2016, when almost 19 years old, Missipo made her debut with the Belgian women's national team in the win against Estonia in qualifying for the 2017 European Championships. Missipo was included in the Belgian national team squad for Euro 2017, but was subsequently excluded for disciplinary reasons by national coach Ives Serneels and replaced by Sara Yuceil of PSV.

After the European Championship Missipo was called up again by Serneels, but an injury precluded her from playing for the national team. She returned to the senior national team for the 2018 Cyprus Cup, where she played in all of Belgium's matches. She has since become a regular member of the Belgian national team, also being called up for the 2019 Cyprus Women's Cup and the 2020 Algarve Cup.

Missipo was selected for UEFA Women's Euro 2022 in England, where the Red Flames were beaten in the quarter-finals 1-0 by Sweden. She went on to contribute to Belgium's successful qualification for UEFA Women's Euro 2025 via the play-offs, scoring in the play-offs against Greece in a 5-0 home win, starting both legs of the play-off final against Ukraine.

On 11 June 2025, Missipo was called up to the Belgium squad for the UEFA Women's Euro 2025.

== Career statistics ==
=== Club ===
As of match played 15 November 2026

Appearances and goals by club, season and competition
Club	Season	League			National cup (Note: Includes Coppa Italia Women and Women's FA Cup)		League cup (Note: Includes Serie A Women's Cup and Women's League Cup)		Europe		Total	
Club	Season	Division	Apps	Goals	Apps	Goals	Apps	Goals	Apps	Goals	Apps	Goals
Anderlecht	2020–21	Belgian Women's Super League	22	2	0	0	—		2 (Note: Appearances in UEFA Women's Champions League)	0	24	2
Basel	2022–23	Swiss Women's Super League	22	4	0	0	—		—		22	4
Sassuolo	2023–24	Serie A Women	24	1	2	0	—		—		26	1
Sassuolo	2024–25	Serie A Women	21	3	4	0	—		—		25	3
Sassuolo	2025–26	Serie A Women	22	2	0	0	3	0	—		25	2
Sassuolo	Total		67	6	6	0	3	0	—		76	6
Sunderland	2026–27	Women's Super League 2	8	0	0	0	3	0	—		11	0
Career total			119	12	6	0	6	0	2	0	133	12

== International goals ==
No.	Date	Venue	Opponent	Score	Result	Competition
1.	26 September 2023	Hampden Park, Glasgow, Scotland	Scotland	1–0	1–1	2023–24 UEFA Women's Nations League
2.	29 October 2024	Den Dreef, Leuven, Belgium	Greece	4–0	5–0	UEFA Women's Euro 2025 qualifying play-offs
3.	7 March 2026	BSC Stadium, Budaörs, Hungary	Israel	5–0	5–0	2027 FIFA Women's World Cup qualification

== Personal life ==
Missipo is of Cameroonian descent and openly lesbian.

Missipo has a tattoo of "Vis ta vie" (Live your life). She also wears a ring that says "Self Love Club".

== Honours ==
Gent

- Belgian Cup (2): 2016/17, 2018/19

Anderlecht

- Super League (1): 2020/21
