= Mary McAteer =

Welsh footballer

Personal information
- Birth name: Mary Grace McAteer
- Date of birth: 2 January 2004 (age 22)
- Place of birth: Ledbury, England
- Position: Forward

Team information
- Current team: Ipswich Town (on loan from Charlton Athletic)

Youth career
- Aston Villa

Senior career*
Years	Team	Apps	(Gls)
–2022	Aston Villa		
2022–2023	Coventry United	15	(3)
2023–2025	Sunderland	46	(8)
2025–	Charlton Athletic W.F.C.	23	(1)
2026–	→ Ipswich Town (loan)	0	(0)

International career^{‡}
2023–	Wales	7	(1)
- * Club domestic league appearances and goals as of 10 June 2025 ‡ National team caps and goals as of 10 June 2025

Mary Grace McAteer is a professional footballer who plays as a forward for Women's Super League 2 club Ipswich Town, on loan from Charlton Athletic and the Wales national team.

She has previously played for Aston Villa, Coventry United, and Sunderland.

== Club career ==
Beginning her career in the Aston Villa academy, McAteer played the 2022–23 season with Coventry United. She spent the following two seasons with Sunderland, scoring seven goals in 38 appearances during her time at the club.

On 24 July 2025, it was announced that McAteer had signed a two-year contract with Women's Super League 2 side Charlton Athletic.

On 3 September 2026, McAteer was announced at Ipswich Town on loan.

== International career ==
McAteer made her debut for Wales in a 5–1 defeat to Germany on 27 October 2023 and scored her first goal against Kosovo on 16 July 2024.

=== International goals ===
No.	Date	Venue	Opponent	Score	Result	Competition
1.	16 July 2024	Parc y Scarlets, Llanelli, Wales	Kosovo	2–0	2–0	UEFA Women's Euro 2025 qualifying

== Career statistics ==
As of match played 4 May 2025

Some entries may be missing or incomplete due to lack of historical statistics.

Appearances and goals by club, season and competition
Club	Season	League			National Cup		Cup		Total	
Club	Season	Division	Apps	Goals	Apps	Goals	Apps	Goals	Apps	Goals
Coventry United	2022–23	Women's Championship	11	3	3	0	1	0	17	3
Sunderland	2023–24	Women's Championship	22	6	2	0	2	1	30	7
Sunderland	2024–25	Women's Championship	17	2	3	0	2	0	25	3
Sunderland	Total		39	8	5	0	4	1	55	10
Career Total			50	11	8	0	5	1	72	13
