= Grace McCatty =

English footballer (born 1989)

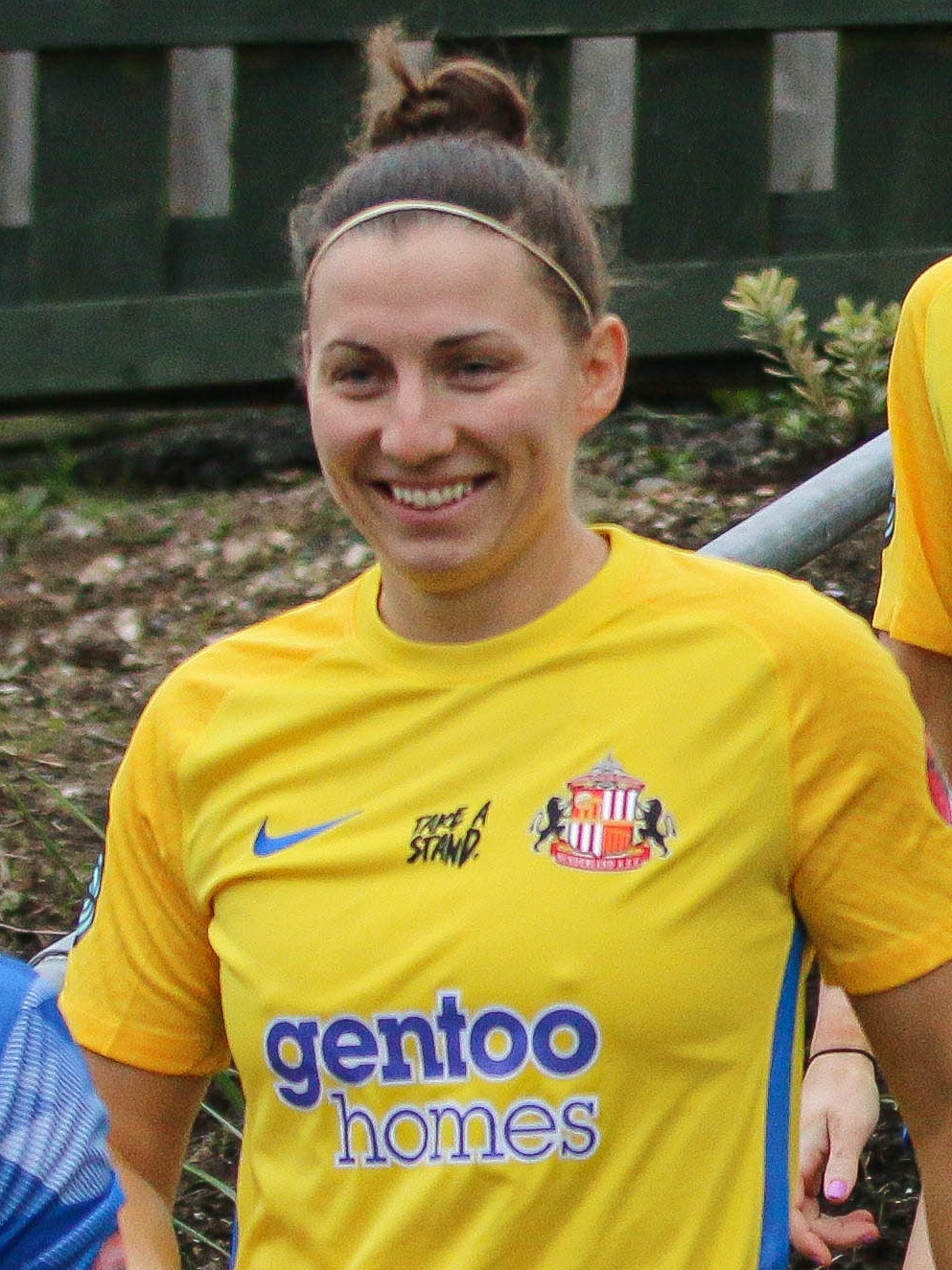
- McCatty in 2022

Personal information
- Full name: Grace Elizabeth McCatty
- Date of birth: 28 September 1989 (age 37)
- Place of birth: Gloucester, England
- Position: Defender

Youth career
- Quedgeley Wanderers FC
- Gloucester City Girls FC
- Gloucester City WFC

Senior career*
| Years | Team | Apps | (Gls) |
| 2006–2017 | Bristol City | 141 | |
| 2017–2018 | Durham | 6 | (0) |
| 2018–2024 | Sunderland | 111? | |
| 2024–2025 | Sunderland | | |
Medal record
Women's football
Representing Great Britain
Summer Universiade
| Gold medal – first place | 2013 Kazan | Team |
- * Club domestic league appearances and goals

Grace Elizabeth McCatty (born 28 September 1989) is an English former footballer who played as a defender, finishing her career with Sunderland. Prior to her move to the North-East with Durham, she featured eight times in the UEFA Women's Champions League for Bristol City.

== Playing career ==
=== Bristol City, 2006–2017 ===
McCatty signed with Bristol Academy from Gloucester City in 2006, and remained with the club for the 2011 FA WSL season. She made her first FA WSL appearance for the senior squad against Birmingham City L.F.C. on 14 April 2011. She made 14 appearances during her first season with Bristol. The team finished in fifth place with a 4–6–3 record. During the 2012 FA WSL season, Matthews made 11 appearances helping the team finish in fourth place with a 4–4–6 record.

In 2014, McCatty played for Bristol in the 2014–15 UEFA Women's Champions League. Bristol was the only English team to make the quarterfinals where they were eliminated by eventual winners Frankfurt. In 2015, she captained the team at the 2015–16 UEFA Women's Champions League.

=== Durham, 2017–2018 ===
After over 100 appearances and just more than ten years with Bristol City, McCatty departed to join fellow FA WSL 2 side Durham.

=== Sunderland AFC, 2018–2025 ===
McCatty joined former Durham team-mate Jordan Atkinson at Sunderland for the 2018-19 season. She made her debut in a 2–1 away win at Bradford City in Sunderland's second game of the season. She retired at the end of the 2023–24 Women's Championship season. She made her return from retirement on 31 October 2024, rejoining Sunderland AFC Women until the end of the 2024/25 season. Following the end of the season, it was announced that she had retired, with the club describing her as having been a "superb role model" during her time with Sunderland.

== Career statistics ==
Correct as of 10 November 2019

=== Club ===
| Club | Season | League | | | FA Cup | | League Cup | | Europe | | Total | | |
| Club | Season | Division | Apps | Goals | Apps | Goals | Apps | Goals | Apps | Goals | Apps | Goals | |
|---|---|---|---|---|---|---|---|---|---|---|---|---|---|
| Bristol Academy | Season | 2006-07 | FA Women's Premier League | 9 | 0 | 0 | 0 | 0 | 0 | - | - | 9 | 0 |
| Bristol Academy | 2007-08 | FA Women's Premier League | 20 | 0 | 0 | 0 | 0 | 0 | - | - | 20 | 0 | |
| Bristol Academy | 2008-09 | FA Women's Premier League | 16 | 1 | 0 | 0 | 0 | 0 | - | - | 0 | 0 | |
| Bristol Academy | 2009-10 | FA Women's Premier League | 19 | 4 | 0 | 0 | 0 | 0 | - | - | 0 | 0 | |
| Bristol Academy | 2011 | FA WSL | 14 | 3 | 0 | 0 | 0 | 0 | - | - | 0 | 0 | |
| Bristol Academy | 2012 | FA WSL | 11 | 1 | 0 | 0 | 0 | 0 | - | - | 0 | 0 | |
| Bristol Academy | 2013 | FA WSL | 17 | 0 | 0 | 0 | 0 | 0 | - | - | 0 | 0 | |
| Bristol Academy | 2014 | FA WSL 1 | 14 | 0 | 0 | 0 | 0 | 0 | - | - | 0 | 0 | |
| Bristol Academy | 2015 | FA WSL 1 | 6 | 0 | 0 | 0 | 0 | 0 | - | - | 0 | 0 | |
| Bristol City | 2016 | FA WSL 2 | 15 | 0 | 0 | 0 | 0 | 0 | - | - | 0 | 0 | |
| Bristol City | 2017 | FA WSL Spring Series | 0 | 0 | 0 | 0 | 0 | 0 | - | - | 0 | 0 | |
| Durham | 2017-18 | FA WSL 2 | 6 | 0 | 0 | 0 | 0 | 0 | - | - | 0 | 0 | |
| Sunderland | 2018-19 | FA Women's National League North | 21 | 3 | 0 | 0 | 3 | 0 | - | - | 24 | 0 | |
| Sunderland | 2019-20 | FA Women's National League North | 7 | 2 | 0 | 0 | 2 | 0 | - | - | 9 | 0 | |
| Total | | | 175 | 14 | 0 | 0 | 5 | 0 | - | - | 0 | 0 | |

== Honours ==
Bristol City

- FA Women's Super League Runner-up: 2013
- FA Women's Cup Runner-up: 2011 2013

Individual

- Her Football Hub team of the month for October 2021

== Personal life ==
McCatty has done philanthropic work in Zambia.
