= Alex Windell =

English footballer

Personal information
- Full name: Alexandra Rose Windell
- Date of birth: 18 September 1990 (age 36)
- Place of birth: England
- Position: Midfielder

Senior career*
Years	Team	Apps	(Gls)
2011–2014	Bristol Academy	30	(1)
2015–2016	Birmingham City	18	(0)
- * Club domestic league appearances and goals

Alexandra Rose "Alex" Windell (born 18 September 1990) is an English football midfielder who most recently played for Birmingham City F.C.
