= Danielle Hill =

English footballer (born 1988)

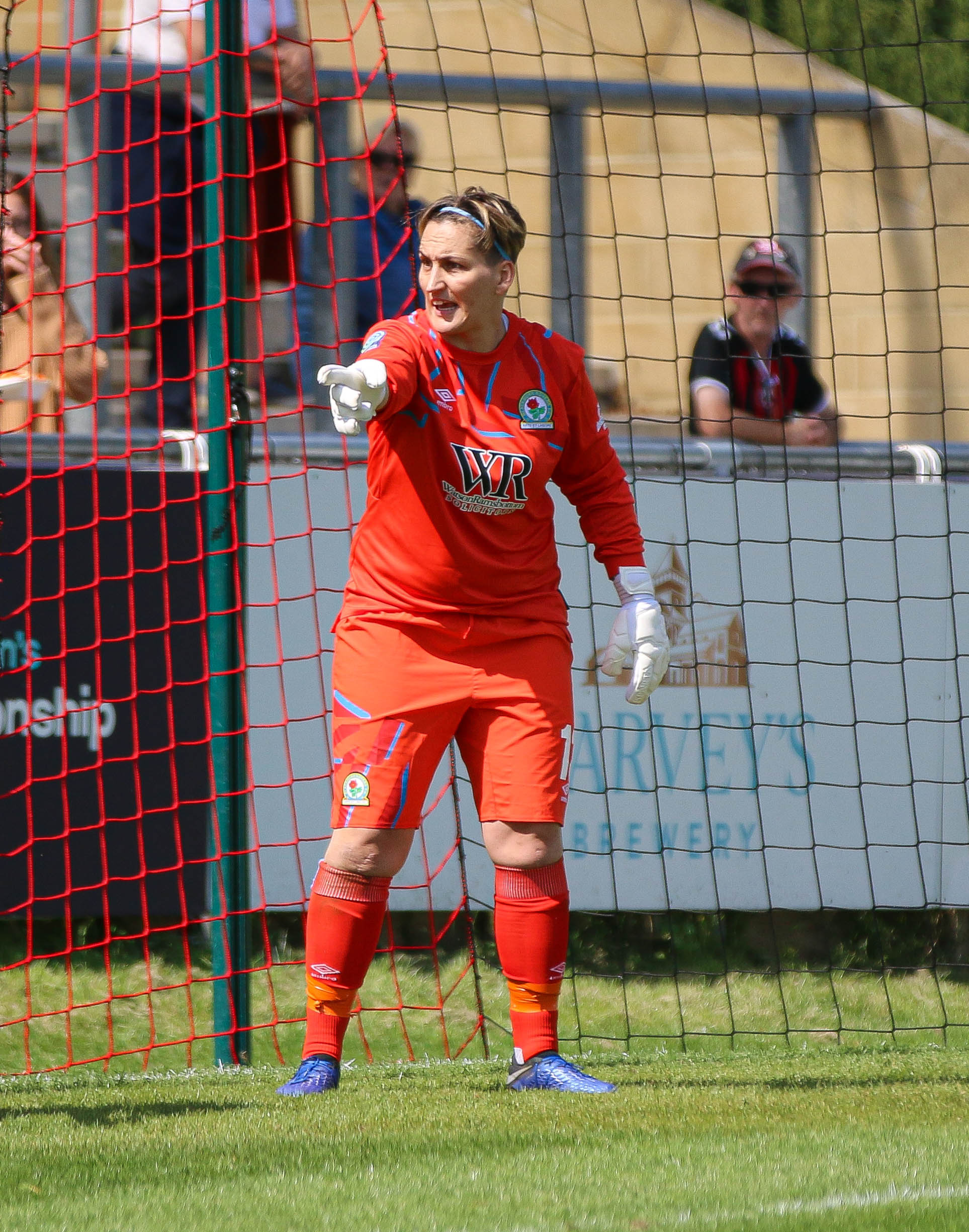
- Hill playing for Blackburn Rovers in August 2019

Personal information
- Full name: Danielle Marie Hill
- Date of birth: 15 April 1988 (age 38)
- Place of birth: Liverpool, England
- Position: Goalkeeper

Team information
- Current team: Blackburn Rovers
- Number: 13

Youth career
- Everton Ladies

Senior career*
Years	Team	Apps	(Gls)
2003–2008	Everton		
2005	ÍBV	3	(0)
2008–2010	Blackburn Rovers		
2010–2012	Everton	8	(0)
2013–2014	Avaldsnes IL	0	(0)
2014	Durham		
2014–2015	Liverpool Feds		
2015	Doncaster Rovers Belles	0	(0)
2015	Notts County	0	(0)
2015–2018	Blackburn Rovers	80	(0)
2015	→ Birmingham City (loan)	0	(0)
2019–2020	Blackburn Rovers	4	(0)
- * Club domestic league appearances and goals as of 00:25 27 August 2019 (UTC)

Danielle Marie Hill (born 15 April 1988) is an English former football goalkeeper and currently the goalkeeping coach for the Blackburn Rovers of the FA Women's Championship. She retired in 2020 after a spell with Blackburn Rovers. Hill briefly played for Doncaster Rovers Belles in the FA WSL 2. Born in Liverpool, she began her career with Everton Ladies and had a previous spell with Blackburn Rovers. She also played for ÍBV of the Icelandic Úrvalsdeild and in Norway for Toppserien club Avaldsnes IL. She has represented England up to Under 23 level.

== Club career ==
Hill joined Everton as a junior, making her senior debut at the age of 15. Although primarily an understudy to first-choice club and England keeper Rachel Brown, she took over when Brown was injured during the 2007–08 season, playing in the League Cup Final win over Arsenal and earning her first call-up to the senior England squad.

In the 2005 summer season, Hill played in Iceland with ÍBV and made three Úrvalsdeild appearances.

Hill left Everton to join Blackburn Rovers Ladies in the 2008 close season. However, in only her second game for her new club, Hill suffered cruciate ligament damage against Chelsea and missed the remainder of the season.

In September 2010 it was revealed that Hill had re-signed for Everton, when she was named in their UEFA Women's Champions League squad.

At Everton's 2012 Christmas party, Hill was involved in an altercation with academy coach Mick O'Brien. She left the club in the aftermath of the incident and moved to Norwegian club Avaldsnes IL on a short-term contract.

In January 2015 Hill signed for Doncaster Rovers Belles, having spent the previous season with Durham WFC. Later in the 2015 season Hill was attached to Notts County. She was ineligible for the 2015 FA Women's Cup Final and The Football Association refused Notts County's request for dispensation to sign another goalkeeper, so Carly Telford played in the team's 1–0 defeat at Wembley Stadium despite a shoulder injury.

In October 2015, Hill, who had been back playing for Blackburn Rovers, signed a short-term deal for Birmingham City as cover for the injured Rebecca Spencer. After a brief period of retirement, she re-joined Blackburn in February 2019.

Hill retired at the end of the 2019–20 season and joined the Rovers staff as the goalkeeper coach.

== International career ==
Hill has represented England at Under-19 and Under-23 level.

== Personal life ==
Tony Hateley is Hill's grandfather, and Mark Hateley is her uncle. Hill attended sixth form at Alsop High School, after winning the national Under-16 Schools championship with Notre Dame Catholic College (Liverpool).

== Blackburn statistics ==
Club	Season	League		WFA Cup		Premier League Cup		County Cup		Other		Total	
Club	Season	Apps	Goals	Apps	Goals	Apps	Goals	Apps	Goals	Apps	Goals	Apps	Goals
Blackburn Rovers Ladies	2008–09	2	0	0	0	0	0	0	0	0	0	2	0
Blackburn Rovers Ladies	2009–10	0	0	0	0	0	0	0	0	0	0	0	0
Blackburn Rovers Ladies	Club total	2	0	0	0	0	0	0	0	0	0	2	0
