= 2026–27 Nottingham Forest W.F.C. season =

Nottingham Forest
2026–27 season
- Owner: Evangelos Marinakis
- Chairman: Nicholas Randall KC
- Head Coach: Tom Mallinson
- Stadium: City Ground
- Women's Super League 2: 5th
- Women's FA Cup: Third round
- WSL Players Cup: League Phase, 16th
- Top goalscorer: League: Chantelle Boye-Hlorkah; Tuva Espås (4 Goals each); All: Chantelle Boye-Hlorkah; Tuva Espås (4 Goals each)
- Highest home attendance: 2,577 (vs Leicester City, Women's Super League 2, 15 November 2026)
- Lowest home attendance: 728 (vs Aston Villa, WSL Players Cup, 23 September 2026)
- Average home league attendance: 1,795
- Biggest win: 4–0 vs Burnley (H) (WSL Players Cup – 1 November 2026)
- Biggest defeat: 1–4 vs Liverpool (H) (WSL Players Cup – 18 November 2026)
| Home colours | Away colours | Third colours |
- All statistics correct as of 18 November 2026.

The 2026–27 season is Nottingham Forest Women's second season in the Women's Super League 2, which stands at level two of the women's football league pyramid.

It was Tom Mallinson's first season as head coach after the club parted ways with Carly Davies.

== Squad information ==
=== First team ===
As of 9 September 2026

| No. | Name | Nat. | Date of birth (age) | Since | Signed from |
Goalkeepers
| 1 | Emily Batty | (England) | 2 November 1998 (age 28) | 18 July 2021 | (England) Sheffield United |
| 24 | Katie Cox | (England) | 28 April 2006 (age 20) | 19 August 2026 | (England) Chelsea |
| 29 | Georgie Ferguson | (England) | 29 October 2002 (age 24) | 11 August 2024 | (England) Birmingham City |
Defenders
| 2 | Cerys Brown | (England) | 22 June 2005 (age 21) | 3 July 2026 | (England) London City Lionesses |
| 3 | Abbie Lafayette | (England) | 1 April 2002 (age 24) | 19 June 2026 | (England) Sheffield United |
| 4 | Georgia Brougham | (England) | 18 March 1996 (age 30) | 23 July 2025 | (England) London City Lionesses |
| 5 | Chloe Mustaki | (Republic of Ireland) | 29 July 1995 (age 31) | 10 July 2025 | (England) Bristol City |
| 12 | Ebba Hed | (Sweden) | 3 November 1999 (age 27) | 4 September 2025 | (Sweden) Djurgårdens |
| 15 | Hannah Coan | (England) | 13 April 2001 (age 25) | 27 June 2026 | (England) Portsmouth |
| 16 | Codie Thomas | (England) | 30 August 2006 (age 20) | 23 July 2026 | (England) Manchester City |
| 22 | Grace McEwen | (England) | 25 August 2007 (age 19) | 19 August 2026 | (England) Brighton & Hove Albion |
Midfielders
| 11 | Tove Almqvist | (Sweden) | 5 January 1996 (age 30) | 4 September 2025 | (Sweden) Djurgårdens |
| 13 | Rachel Rowe | (Wales) | 13 September 1992 (age 34) | 19 August 2025 | (England) Southampton |
| 14 | Leticia McKenna | (Australia) | 7 August 2002 (age 24) | 4 September 2026 | (Australia) Melbourne City |
| 17 | Freya Thomas | (England) | 28 October 2001 (age 25) | 7 August 2023 | (England) Coventry United |
| 31 | Alana Murphy | (Australia) | 21 September 2005 (age 21) | 2 February 2026 | (Germany) SC Sand |
Forwards
| 6 | Deanne Rose | (Canada) | 3 March 1999 (age 27) | 19 August 2025 | (England) Leicester City |
| 7 | Shania Hayles | (Jamaica) | 22 December 1999 (age 26) | 10 August 2026 | (England) Newcastle United |
| 8 | Chantelle Boye-Hlorkah | (Ghana) | 8 September 1995 (age 31) | 12 August 2025 | (England) London City Lionesses |
| 9 | Melissa Johnson | (Jamaica) | 11 August 1991 (age 35) | 15 July 2024 | (England) Charlton Athletic |
| 10 | Aimee Claypole | (England) | 8 November 2005 (age 21) | 11 August 2025 | (England) Chelsea |
| 18 | Ilona Walta | (Finland) | 5 January 2006 (age 20) | 27 August 2026 | (Norway) Molde FK |
| 20 | Tuva Espås | (Norway) | 22 March 1999 (age 27) | 25 August 2026 | (Norway) Vålerenga |
| 21 | Lois Shooter | (England) | 6 January 2008 (age 18) | 23 July 2026 | (England) Chelsea |

== Squad Changes ==
=== Transfers In ===
| Date | Pos. | Player | From | Fee | Ref. |
|---|---|---|---|---|---|
| 19 June 2026 | DF | Abbie Lafayette | Sheffield United | Free agent | |
| 27 June 2026 | DF | Hannah Coan | Portsmouth | Free agent | |
| 3 July 2026 | DF | Cerys Brown | London City Lionesses | Undisclosed | |
| 10 August 2026 | FW | Shania Hayles | Newcastle United | Free agent | |
| 25 August 2026 | FW | Tuva Espås | Vålerenga | Undisclosed | |
| 27 August 2026 | FW | Ilona Walta | Molde FK | Undisclosed | |
| 4 September 2026 | MF | Leticia McKenna | Melbourne City | Undisclosed | |

=== Transfers Out ===
| Date | Pos. | Player | To | Fee | Ref. |
|---|---|---|---|---|---|
| 27 June 2026 | MF | Amy Rodgers | Brøndby IF | Undisclosed | |
| 9 July 2026 | DF | Kirsty Smith | Rangers | Undisclosed | |

=== Loans In ===
| Date from | Pos. | Player | From | Until | Ref. |
|---|---|---|---|---|---|
| 22 July 2026 | FW | Lois Shooter | Chelsea | 30 June 2027 | |
| 23 July 2026 | DF | Codie Thomas | Manchester City | 30 June 2027 | |
| 19 August 2026 | DF | Grace McEwen | Brighton & Hove Albion | 30 June 2027 | |
| 19 August 2026 | GK | Katie Cox | Chelsea | 30 June 2027 | |

=== Loans Out ===
| Date from | Pos. | Player | To | Until | Ref. |

=== Released ===
| Date | Pos. | Player | Subsequent club | Date signed | Ref. |
|---|---|---|---|---|---|
| 30 June 2026 | DF | Mollie Green | Derby County | 9 October 2026 | |
| 30 June 2026 | DF | Caragh Hamilton | | | |
| 30 June 2026 | FW | Casey Howe | Celtic | 8 July 2026 | |
| 30 June 2026 | DF | Nat Johnson | Norwich City | 17 July 2026 | |
| 30 June 2026 | MF | Hollie Olding | Wolverhampton Wanderers | 7 July 2026 | |
| 30 June 2026 | FW | Joy Omewa | BK Häcken | 20 July 2026 | |
| 30 June 2026 | FW | Libby Smith | Hibernian | 23 August 2026 | |
| 30 June 2026 | FW | Charlie Wellings | Burnley | 14 July 2026 | |

=== New contracts ===
| Date | Pos. | Player | Contract length | Ref. |
|---|---|---|---|---|
| 9 July 2026 | MF | Alana Murphy | Two years | |
| 14 July 2026 | DF | Chloe Mustaki | Two years | |

== Pre-season and friendlies ==
Win Draw Loss Fixtures

| 26 July 2026 Friendly | Nottingham Forest | 4–1 | Vancouver Rise Academy | Kamloops, Canada |
| 02:00 BST | Thomas 5'; Mustaki 21', 45+2'; Shooter 61' | Report | Zha 45' | Stadium: Hillside Stadium |

| 29 July 2026 Friendly | Nottingham Forest | 1–1 (3–2 p) | BC Premier League Selects | Kamloops, Canada |
| 02:30 BST | Shooter 45' (pen) | Report | Leonard 80' (pen) | Stadium: Hillside Stadium |
| | Penalties |
| | Rose (penalty missed); Hed (penalty missed); Almqvist (penalty scored); Thomas (penalty scored); Brougham (penalty scored) | | Penalty missed Penalty scored |

| 2 August 2026 Friendly | Nottingham Forest | 3–0 | Kamloops United | Kamloops, Canada |
| 02:30 BST | Shooter 37', 47'; Thomas 59' | Report | | Stadium: Hillside Stadium |

| 19 August 2026 Friendly | Wolverhampton Wanderers | 0–1 | Nottingham Forest | Telford |
| 19:00 BST | | Report | Shooter 17' | Stadium: New Bucks Head |

== Competitions ==
=== Overall record ===
| Competition | First match | Last match | Starting round | Record | | | | | | | |
| Competition | First match | Last match | Starting round | Pld | W | D | L | GF | GA | GD | Win % |
|---|---|---|---|---|---|---|---|---|---|---|---|
| Women's Super League 2 | 6 September 2026 | | Matchday 1 | 8 | 3 | 5 | 0 | 15 | 9 | +6 | 37.50 |
| Women's FA Cup | | | | 0 | 0 | 0 | 0 | 0 | 0 | +0 | — |
| WSL Players Cup | 23 September 2026 | | League phase | 4 | 1 | 1 | 2 | 5 | 6 | −1 | 25.00 |
| Total | | | | 12 | 4 | 6 | 2 | 20 | 15 | +5 | 33.33 |

Last updated: 18 November 2026
Source: Soccerway

=== Women's Super League 2 ===
==== League table ====
| Pos | Team | Pld | W | D | L | GF | GA | GD | Pts | Qualification |
|---|---|---|---|---|---|---|---|---|---|---|
| 3 | Ipswich Town | 8 | 5 | 2 | 1 | 13 | 7 | +6 | 17 | Qualification for pre-qualifying play-off |
| 4 | Bristol City | 8 | 5 | 1 | 2 | 17 | 11 | +6 | 16 | |
| 5 | Nottingham Forest | 8 | 3 | 5 | 0 | 15 | 9 | +6 | 14 | |
| 6 | Southampton | 8 | 3 | 4 | 1 | 16 | 7 | +9 | 13 | |
| 7 | Wolverhampton Wanderers | 8 | 3 | 1 | 4 | 16 | 18 | −2 | 10 | |

Updated to match(es) played on 15 November 2026. Source: WSL 2 League Table
Rules for classification: 1) Points; 2) Goal difference; 3) Number of goals scored

==== Results summary ====
| Overall | | | | | | | | Home | | | | | | Away | | | | | |
| Pld | W | D | L | GF | GA | GD | Pts | W | D | L | GF | GA | GD | W | D | L | GF | GA | GD |
|---|---|---|---|---|---|---|---|---|---|---|---|---|---|---|---|---|---|---|---|
| 8 | 3 | 5 | 0 | 15 | 9 | +6 | 14 | 1 | 3 | 0 | 7 | 5 | +2 | 2 | 2 | 0 | 8 | 4 | +4 |

Last updated: 15 November 2026.
Source: Soccerway

==== Results by round ====
| Round | 1 | 2 | 3 | 4 | 5 | 6 | 7 | 8 | 9 | 10 | 11 | 12 | 13 | 14 | 15 | 16 | 17 | 18 | 19 | 20 | 21 | 22 |
|---|---|---|---|---|---|---|---|---|---|---|---|---|---|---|---|---|---|---|---|---|---|---|
| Ground | A | H | A | A | H | H | A | H | | | | | | | | | | | | | | |
| Result | D | D | W | D | W | D | W | D | | | | | | | | | | | | | | |
| Position | 6 | 6 | 6 | 6 | 4 | 5 | 4 | 5 | | | | | | | | | | | | | | |
| Points | 1 | 2 | 5 | 6 | 9 | 10 | 13 | 14 | | | | | | | | | | | | | | |

Updated to match(es) played on 15 November 2026. Source: Soccerway
A = Away; H = Home; W = Win; D = Draw; L = Loss

==== Matches ====
Win Draw Loss Fixtures

| 6 September 2026 1 | Ipswich Town | 1–1 | Nottingham Forest | Myland |
| 14:00 BST | Mitchell (yellow card) 82'; Hornby 90+3' | Report | Rowe (yellow card) 32'; Brougham (yellow card) 43'; Murphy 58'; Lafayette (yellow card) 90+2' | Stadium: JobServe Community Stadium; Attendance: 1,091; Referee: Joanne Horwood |

| 13 September 2026 2 | Nottingham Forest | 2–2 | Watford | West Bridgford |
| 14:00 BST | Murphy 45'; Boye-Hlorkah 54' | Report | Bailey 13'; Noonan 21'; Wilson (yellow card) 90' | Stadium: City Ground; Attendance: 1,178; Referee: Levi Gray |

| 20 September 2026 3 | Durham | 1–2 | Nottingham Forest | Durham |
| 12:00 BST | Hutchison 6'; Bradley (yellow card) 39'; Fergusson (yellow card) 45'; Morran (yellow card) 53' | Report | Boye-Hlorkah 16'; Brougham 50' | Stadium: Maiden Castle Sports Centre; Attendance: 642; Referee: Jodie Hunter |

| 27 September 2026 4 | Southampton | 1–1 | Nottingham Forest | Southampton |
| 14:00 BST | Jupp 63' | Report | Lafayette (yellow card) 37'; Brougham (yellow card) 54'; Espås (yellow card) 70'; Boye-Hlorkah 82', (yellow card) 84'; Murphy (yellow card) 88' | Stadium: St Mary's Stadium; Attendance: 2,418; Referee: Ryan Atkin |

| 4 October 2026 5 | Nottingham Forest | 2–0 | Burnley | West Bridgford |
| 14:00 BST | Espås 43', 73' | Report | | Stadium: City Ground; Attendance: 1,221; Referee: Francesca Catchpole |

| 25 October 2026 6 | Nottingham Forest | 2–2 | Newcastle United | West Bridgford |
| 14:00 BST | McKenna 10', 15' (pen.); C. Thomas (yellow card) 56'; Rowe (yellow card) 67' | Report | McGovern 50'; Bradley (yellow card) 64'; M. Thomas 86' | Stadium: City Ground; Attendance: 2,203; Referee: Stacey Pearson |

| 8 November 2026 7 | Wolverhampton Wanderers | 1–4 | Nottingham Forest | Telford |
| 14:00 GMT | Morphet (yellow card) 14'; Daniëls (yellow card) 45+1'; Worsey 83' | Report | McKenna 24'; Espås 52', 56'; Thomas 66' | Stadium: New Bucks Head; Referee: Hannah Gardner |

| 15 November 2026 8 | Nottingham Forest | 1–1 | Leicester City | West Bridgford |
| 14:00 GMT | McKenna 18'; Boye-Hlorkah (yellow card) 85' | Report | McLoughlin (yellow card) 36'; Ale (yellow card) 45'; Nyström 63', (yellow card) 79' | Stadium: City Ground; Attendance: 2,577; Referee: Ryan Atkin |

| 21 December 2026 9 | Bristol City | v | Nottingham Forest | Bristol |
| 17:00 GMT | | | | Stadium: Ashton Gate |

=== Women's FA Cup ===
==== Matches ====
Win Draw Loss Fixtures

=== WSL Players Cup ===
==== League Phase ====
Win Draw Loss Fixtures

| 23 September 2026 | Nottingham Forest | 0–2 | Aston Villa | West Bridgford |
| 19:00 BST | | Report | Hijikata 66'; Grant 83' | Stadium: City Ground; Attendance: 728; Referee: Callum Parke |

| 18 October 2026 | Sheffield United | 0–0 (4–2 p) | Nottingham Forest | Scunthorpe |
| 13:00 BST | Reavill (yellow card) 34'; Devlin (yellow card) 80'; Andrews (penalty missed) 85' | Report | Coan (yellow card) 85' | Stadium: Glanford Park; Referee: Fabio Roque |
| | Penalties |
| | Andrews (penalty scored); Houssein (penalty scored); Quinn (penalty scored); Rouse (penalty missed); Pearse (penalty scored) | | (penalty scored) McKenna; (penalty missed) Shooter; (penalty missed) Boye-Hlorkah; (penalty scored) Lafayette |

| 1 November 2026 | Nottingham Forest | 4–0 | Burnley | West Bridgford |
| 14:00 GMT | Murphy 40'; Lafayette 67'; Johnson 88'; Shooter 90' | Report | | Stadium: City Ground; Attendance: 790; Referee: Laura van Lier |

| 18 November 2026 | Nottingham Forest | 1–4 | Liverpool | West Bridgford |
| 19:00 GMT | Batty (red card) 11'; Rose 84' | Report | Enderby 20', 69'; Olsson 40'; Ferguson 44' (o.g.); Höbinger (yellow card) 88' | Stadium: City Ground; Attendance: 1,002; Referee: Megan Wilson |

| 22 November 2026 | Newcastle United | v | Nottingham Forest | Gateshead |
| 14:00 GMT | | | | Stadium: Gateshead International Stadium |

| 16 December 2026 | Birmingham City | v | Nottingham Forest | Bordesley |
| 19:00 GMT | | | | Stadium: St Andrew's |

| Pos | Grp | Team | Pld | W | PW | PL | L | GF | GA | GD | Pts |
|---|---|---|---|---|---|---|---|---|---|---|---|
| 14 | SR | Wolverhampton Wanderers | 4 | 1 | 1 | 0 | 2 | 4 | 12 | −8 | 5 |
| 15 | SR | Ipswich Town | 4 | 1 | 0 | 1 | 2 | 6 | 5 | +1 | 4 |
| 16 | NR | Nottingham Forest | 4 | 1 | 0 | 1 | 2 | 5 | 6 | −1 | 4 |
| 17 | NR | Newcastle United | 4 | 1 | 0 | 0 | 3 | 6 | 7 | −1 | 3 |
| 18 | NR | Burnley | 4 | 1 | 0 | 0 | 3 | 3 | 11 | −8 | 3 |

Updated to match(es) played on 18 November 2026. Source: WSL Football
Rules for classification: 1) Points; 2) Goal difference; 3) Number of goals scored; 4) Number of wins; 5) Head-to-head record

== Squad statistics ==
Italics indicate a loaned in player.

=== Appearances ===
As of 18 November 2026

Starting appearances are listed first, followed by substitute appearances after the + symbol where applicable.

| No. | Pos | Nat | Player | Total | | WSL | | FA Cup | | WSL Players Cup | |
| No. | Pos | Nat | Player | Apps | Goals | Apps | Goals | Apps | Goals | Apps | Goals |
|---|---|---|---|---|---|---|---|---|---|---|---|
| 1 | GK | (England) ENG | Emily Batty | 9 | 0 | 4+1 | 0 | 0 | 0 | 4 | 0 |
| 2 | DF | (England) ENG | Cerys Brown | 9 | 0 | 5+2 | 0 | 0 | 0 | 1+1 | 0 |
| 3 | DF | (England) ENG | Abbie Lafayette | 12 | 1 | 8 | 0 | 0 | 0 | 4 | 1 |
| 4 | DF | (England) ENG | Georgia Brougham | 11 | 1 | 8 | 1 | 0 | 0 | 1+2 | 0 |
| 5 | DF | (Republic of Ireland) IRL | Chloe Mustaki | 9 | 0 | 5+1 | 0 | 0 | 0 | 3 | 0 |
| 6 | FW | (Canada) CAN | Deanne Rose | 6 | 1 | 0+2 | 0 | 0 | 0 | 2+2 | 1 |
| 7 | FW | (Jamaica) JAM | Shania Hayles | 1 | 0 | 0+1 | 0 | 0 | 0 | 0 | 0 |
| 8 | FW | (Ghana) GHA | Chantelle Boye-Hlorkah | 11 | 4 | 8 | 4 | 0 | 0 | 2+1 | 0 |
| 9 | FW | (Jamaica) JAM | Melissa Johnson | 2 | 1 | 0 | 0 | 0 | 0 | 0+2 | 1 |
| 10 | FW | (England) ENG | Aimee Claypole | 2 | 0 | 1+1 | 0 | 0 | 0 | 0 | 0 |
| 11 | MF | (Sweden) SWE | Tove Almqvist | 8 | 0 | 2+2 | 0 | 0 | 0 | 4 | 0 |
| 12 | DF | (Sweden) SWE | Ebba Hed | 7 | 0 | 2+2 | 0 | 0 | 0 | 3 | 0 |
| 13 | MF | (Wales) WAL | Rachel Rowe | 8 | 0 | 1+4 | 0 | 0 | 0 | 2+1 | 0 |
| 14 | MF | (Australia) AUS | Leticia McKenna | 8 | 3 | 4+1 | 3 | 0 | 0 | 1+2 | 0 |
| 15 | DF | (England) ENG | Hannah Coan | 12 | 0 | 8 | 0 | 0 | 0 | 3+1 | 0 |
| 16 | DF | (England) ENG | Codie Thomas | 9 | 0 | 3+3 | 0 | 0 | 0 | 2+1 | 0 |
| 17 | MF | (England) ENG | Freya Thomas | 11 | 1 | 8 | 1 | 0 | 0 | 2+1 | 0 |
| 18 | FW | (Finland) FIN | Ilona Walta | 6 | 0 | 1+2 | 0 | 0 | 0 | 2+1 | 0 |
| 20 | FW | (Norway) NOR | Tuva Espås | 10 | 4 | 8 | 4 | 0 | 0 | 2 | 0 |
| 21 | FW | (England) ENG | Lois Shooter | 8 | 1 | 0+4 | 0 | 0 | 0 | 2+2 | 1 |
| 22 | DF | (England) ENG | Grace McEwen | 2 | 0 | 0 | 0 | 0 | 0 | 2 | 0 |
| 24 | GK | (England) ENG | Katie Cox | 4 | 0 | 4 | 0 | 0 | 0 | 0 | 0 |
| 29 | GK | (England) ENG | Georgie Ferguson | 1 | 0 | 0 | 0 | 0 | 0 | 0+1 | 0 |
| 31 | MF | (Australia) AUS | Alana Murphy | 12 | 3 | 8 | 2 | 0 | 0 | 2+2 | 1 |

=== Goalscorers ===
As of 18 November 2026

| Rnk | No | Pos | Nat | Name | WSL2 | FA Cup | WSL Players Cup | Total |
|---|---|---|---|---|---|---|---|---|
| 1 | 8 | FW | (Ghana) | Chantelle Boye-Hlorkah | 4 | 0 | 0 | 4 |
| 1 | 20 | FW | (Norway) | Tuva Espås | 4 | 0 | 0 | 4 |
| 3 | 14 | MF | (Australia) | Leticia McKenna | 3 | 0 | 0 | 3 |
| 3 | 31 | MF | (Australia) | Alana Murphy | 2 | 0 | 1 | 3 |
| 5 | 3 | DF | (England) | Abbie Lafayette | 0 | 0 | 1 | 1 |
| 5 | 4 | DF | (England) | Georgia Brougham | 1 | 0 | 0 | 1 |
| 5 | 6 | FW | (Canada) | Deanne Rose | 0 | 0 | 1 | 1 |
| 5 | 9 | FW | (Jamaica) | Melissa Johnson | 0 | 0 | 1 | 1 |
| 5 | 17 | MF | (England) | Freya Thomas | 1 | 0 | 0 | 1 |
| 5 | 21 | FW | (England) | Lois Shooter | 0 | 0 | 1 | 1 |
| Total | | | | | 15 | 0 | 5 | 20 |

=== Assists ===
As of 18 November 2026

| Rank | No. | Pos. | Nat. | Player | WSL2 | FA Cup | WSL Players Cup | Total |
|---|---|---|---|---|---|---|---|---|
| 1 | 8 | FW | (Ghana) | Chantelle Boye-Hlorkah | 3 | 0 | 0 | 3 |
| 2 | 3 | DF | (England) | Abbie Lafayette | 2 | 0 | 0 | 2 |
| 2 | 31 | MF | (Australia) | Alana Murphy | 2 | 0 | 0 | 2 |
| 4 | 2 | DF | (England) | Cerys Brown | 1 | 0 | 0 | 1 |
| 4 | 6 | FW | (Canada) | Deanne Rose | 0 | 0 | 1 | 1 |
| 4 | 11 | MF | (Sweden) | Tove Almqvist | 1 | 0 | 0 | 1 |
| 4 | 14 | MF | (Australia) | Leticia McKenna | 1 | 0 | 0 | 1 |
| Total | | | | | 10 | 0 | 1 | 11 |

=== Clean sheets ===
As of 18 November 2026

Only includes players who appeared for more than 60 minutes.

| Rank | No. | Pos. | Nat. | Player | Matches played | Clean sheet % | WSL2 | FA Cup | WSL Players Cup | Total |
|---|---|---|---|---|---|---|---|---|---|---|
| 1 | 1 | GK | (England) | Emily Batty | 8 | 25.00% | 0 | 0 | 2 | 2 |
| 2 | 24 | GK | (England) | Katie Cox | 3 | 33.33% | 1 | 0 | 0 | 1 |
| 3 | 29 | GK | (England) | Georgie Ferguson | 1 | 0.00% | 0 | 0 | 0 | 0 |
| Totals | | | | | 12 | 25.00% | 1 | 0 | 2 | 3 |

=== Disciplinary record ===
As of 18 November 2026

| No. | Pos. | Nat. | Player | WSL2 | | | FA Cup | | | WSL Players Cup | | | Total | | |
| No. | Pos. | Nat. | Player | Yellow card | (yellow card) (yellow-red card) | Red card | Yellow card | (yellow card) (yellow-red card) | Red card | Yellow card | (yellow card) (yellow-red card) | Red card | Yellow card | (yellow card) (yellow-red card) | Red card |
|---|---|---|---|---|---|---|---|---|---|---|---|---|---|---|---|
| 1 | GK | (England) | Emily Batty | 0 | 0 | 0 | 0 | 0 | 0 | 0 | 0 | 1 | 0 | 0 | 1 |
| 3 | DF | (England) | Abbie Lafayette | 2 | 0 | 0 | 0 | 0 | 0 | 0 | 0 | 0 | 2 | 0 | 0 |
| 4 | DF | (England) | Georgia Brougham | 2 | 0 | 0 | 0 | 0 | 0 | 0 | 0 | 0 | 2 | 0 | 0 |
| 8 | FW | (Ghana) | Chantelle Boye-Hlorkah | 1 | 0 | 0 | 0 | 0 | 0 | 0 | 0 | 0 | 1 | 0 | 0 |
| 13 | MF | (Wales) | Rachel Rowe | 2 | 0 | 0 | 0 | 0 | 0 | 0 | 0 | 0 | 2 | 0 | 0 |
| 15 | DF | (England) | Hannah Coan | 1 | 0 | 0 | 0 | 0 | 0 | 1 | 0 | 0 | 2 | 0 | 0 |
| 16 | DF | (England) | Codie Thomas | 1 | 0 | 0 | 0 | 0 | 0 | 0 | 0 | 0 | 1 | 0 | 0 |
| 20 | FW | (Norway) | Tuva Espås | 1 | 0 | 0 | 0 | 0 | 0 | 0 | 0 | 0 | 1 | 0 | 0 |
| 21 | FW | (England) | Lois Shooter | 0 | 0 | 0 | 0 | 0 | 0 | 1 | 0 | 0 | 1 | 0 | 0 |
| 31 | MF | (Australia) | Alana Murphy | 1 | 0 | 0 | 0 | 0 | 0 | 0 | 0 | 0 | 1 | 0 | 0 |
| Total | | | | 11 | 0 | 0 | 0 | 0 | 0 | 2 | 0 | 1 | 13 | 0 | 1 |
