= 2025–26 Nottingham Forest W.F.C. season =

Nottingham Forest
2025–26 season
- Owner: Evangelos Marinakis
- Chairman: Nicholas Randall KC
- Head Coach: Carly Davies
- Stadium: City Ground, West Bridgford; One Call Stadium, Mansfield
- Women's Super League 2: 7th
- Women's FA Cup: 4th round
- Women's League Cup: Group stage
- Top goalscorer: League: Chantelle Boye-Hlorkah (7); All: Chantelle Boye-Hlorkah (7); Aimee Claypole (7)
- Highest home attendance: 2,624 v Manchester City; 22 November 2025 (Women's League Cup)
- Lowest home attendance: 905 v Sheffield United; 25 January 2026 (Women's Super League 2)
- Average home league attendance: 1,240
- Biggest win: 4 – 1 v Portsmouth (Home); 5 October 2025 (Women's Super League 2)
- Biggest defeat: 1 – 5 v Birmingham City (Away); 1 February 2026 (Women's Super League 2)
Home colours	Away colours	Third colours
- All statistics correct as of 2 May 2026.

The 2025–26 season was Nottingham Forest Women's first season in the Women's Super League 2, which stands at level two of the women's football league pyramid.

== Squad information ==
=== First team ===
As of 3 February 2026

No.	Name	Nat.	Date of birth (age)	Since	Signed from
Goalkeepers
1	Emily Batty	(England)	2 November 1998 (age 28)	18 July 2021	(England) Sheffield United
20	Rebekah Dowsett	(England)	31 May 2007 (age 19)	28 January 2026	(England) West Ham United
29	Georgie Ferguson	(England)	29 October 2002 (age 24)	11 August 2024	(England) Birmingham City
Defenders
2	Jessie Stapleton	(Republic of Ireland)	7 February 2005 (age 21)	28 July 2025	(England) West Ham United
3	Nat Johnson	(Northern Ireland)	12 November 1993 (age 33)	10 August 2023	(England) Lewes
4	Georgia Brougham	(England)	18 March 1996 (age 30)	23 July 2025	(England) London City Lionesses
5	Chloe Mustaki	(Republic of Ireland)	29 July 1995 (age 31)	10 July 2025	(England) Bristol City
12	Ebba Hed	(Sweden)	3 November 1999 (age 27)	4 September 2025	(Sweden) Djurgårdens
16	Mollie Green	(England)	4 August 1997 (age 29)	5 August 2023	(England) Birmingham City
23	Kirsty Smith	(Scotland)	6 January 1994 (age 32)	14 July 2025	(England) West Ham United
24	Cerys Brown	(England)	22 June 2005 (age 21)	31 January 2026	(England) London City Lionesses
Midfielders
8	Amy Rodgers	(Scotland)	4 May 2000 (age 26)	2 July 2025	(England) Bristol City
11	Tove Almqvist	(Sweden)	5 January 1996 (age 30)	4 September 2025	(Sweden) Djurgårdens
13	Rachel Rowe	(Wales)	13 September 1992 (age 34)	19 August 2025	(England) Southampton
15	Hollie Olding	(England)	3 January 1999 (age 27)	23 August 2024	(England) Lewes
17	Freya Thomas	(England)	28 October 2001 (age 25)	7 August 2023	(England) Coventry United
31	Alana Murphy	(Australia)	21 September 2005 (age 21)	2 February 2026	(Germany) SC Sand
Forwards
6	Deanne Rose	(Canada)	3 March 1999 (age 27)	19 August 2025	(England) Leicester City
9	Melissa Johnson	(Jamaica)	11 August 1991 (age 35)	15 July 2024	(England) Charlton Athletic
10	Aimee Claypole	(England)	8 November 2005 (age 21)	11 August 2025	(England) Chelsea
14	Charlie Wellings	(England)	18 May 1998 (age 28)	19 July 2024	(England) Reading
19	Joy Omewa	(Nigeria)	1 December 2002 (age 23)	27 January 2026	(Denmark) Fortuna Hjørring
26	Libby Smith	(England)	11 March 2001 (age 25)	23 January 2026	(United States) Sporting JAX
27	Leanne Kiernan	(Republic of Ireland)	27 April 1999 (age 27)	29 January 2026	(England) Liverpool
33	Chantelle Boye-Hlorkah	(Ghana)	8 September 1995 (age 31)	12 August 2025	(England) London City Lionesses
39	Olivia Johnson	(England)	4 March 2007 (age 19)	3 February 2026	(England) Brighton & Hove Albion

=== Out on loan ===
No.	Name	Nat.	Date of birth (age)	Since	Signed from
Defenders
18	Caragh Hamilton	(Northern Ireland)	18 October 1996 (age 30)	9 August 2024	(England) Lewes
Forwards
22	Casey Howe	(Northern Ireland)	2 September 2002 (age 24)	30 August 2024	(Republic of Ireland) Athlone Town

== Squad Changes ==
=== Transfers In ===
Date	Pos.	Player	From	Fee	Ref.
2 July 2025	MF	Amy Rodgers	Bristol City	Free agent	
10 July 2025	DF	Chloe Mustaki	Bristol City	Free agent	
14 July 2025	DF	Kirsty Smith	West Ham United	Free agent	
23 July 2025	DF	Georgia Brougham	London City Lionesses	Free agent	
1 August 2025	FW	Aimee Claypole	Chelsea	Free agent	
12 August 2025	FW	Chantelle Boye-Hlorkah	London City Lionesses	Free agent	
19 August 2025	MF	Rachel Rowe	Southampton	Free agent	
19 August 2025	FW	Deanne Rose	Leicester City	Free agent	
4 September 2025	DF	Ebba Hed	Djurgårdens	Free agent	
4 September 2025	MF	Tove Almqvist	Djurgårdens	Free agent	
23 January 2026	FW	Libby Smith	Sporting JAX	Free agent	
27 January 2026	FW	Joy Omewa	Fortuna Hjørring	Free agent	
2 February 2026	MF	Alana Murphy	SC Sand	Free agent	

=== Transfers Out ===
Date	Pos.	Player	To	Fee	Ref.

=== Loans In ===
Date from	Pos.	Player	From	Until	Ref.
28 July 2025	DF	Jessie Stapleton	West Ham United	30 June 2026	
8 August 2025	GK	Sophia Poor	London City Lionesses	10 October 2025	
3 September 2025	FW	Vivienne Lia	Arsenal	3 February 2026	
4 September 2025	FW	Nahikari García	Denver Summit	31 December 2025	
4 September 2025	DF	Issy Hobson	Everton	1 October 2025	
28 January 2026	GK	Rebekah Dowsett	West Ham United	30 June 2026	
29 January 2026	FW	Leanne Kiernan	Liverpool	30 June 2026	
31 January 2026	DF	Cerys Brown	London City Lionesses	30 June 2026	
3 February 2026	FW	Olivia Johnson	Brighton & Hove Albion	30 June 2026	

=== Loans Out ===
Date from	Pos.	Player	To	Until	Ref.
3 February 2026	DF	Caragh Hamilton	Sunderland	30 June 2026	
3 February 2026	FW	Casey Howe	Wolverhampton Wanderers	30 June 2026	

=== Released ===
Date	Pos.	Player	Subsequent club	Date signed	Ref.
30 June 2025	DF	Naomi Bedeau	Oxford United	2 July 2025	
30 June 2025	MF	Megan Bell	Linfield	26 July 2025	
30 June 2025	MF	Millie Chandarana	Burnley	28 July 2025	
30 June 2025	FW	Sophie Domingo	Wimbledon	2 September 2026	
30 June 2025	FW	Bridget Galloway	Aberdeen	6 August 2025	
30 June 2025	DF	Jessica Hennessy	Bournemouth	23 July 2025	
30 June 2025	MF	Alice Keitley			
30 June 2025	MF	Kate Longhurst	Retired		
30 June 2025	MF	Holly Manders	Oxford United	4 July 2025	
30 June 2025	GK	Holly Mears	Norwich City	12 July 2025	
30 June 2025	MF	Amy Sims	Wolverhampton Wanderers	27 June 2025	
30 June 2025	FW	Holly Turner	Oxford United	1 July 2025	
25 July 2025	DF	Lyndsey Harkin	Wolverhampton Wanderers	26 July 2025	

=== New contracts ===
Date	Pos.	Player	Contract length	Ref.
29 July 2025	GK	Emily Batty	One year	
29 July 2025	GK	Georgie Ferguson	One year	
4 August 2025	DF	Mollie Green	One year	
14 August 2025	FW	Charlie Wellings	One year	
7 November 2025	MF	Freya Thomas	Two years	
6 March 2026	GK	Emily Batty	One year	
8 June 2026	GK	Georgie Ferguson	Two years	

== Competitions ==
=== Overall record ===
Competition	First match	Last match	Starting round	Final position	Record							
Competition	First match	Last match	Starting round	Final position	Pld	W	D	L	GF	GA	GD	Win %
Women's Super League 2	7 September 2025	2 May 2026	Matchday 1	Seventh	22	9	3	10	27	35	−8	40.91
Women's FA Cup	14 December 2025	18 January 2026	Third round	Fourth round	2	1	0	1	2	3	−1	50.00
Women's League Cup	24 September 2025	22 November 2025	Group stage	Group stage	3	1	1	1	3	4	−1	33.33
Total					27	11	4	12	32	42	−10	40.74

Source: Soccerway

=== Women's Super League 2 ===
==== League table ====
Pos	Team	Pld	W	D	L	GF	GA	GD	Pts
5	Southampton	22	10	5	7	44	26	+18	35
6	Newcastle United	22	8	9	5	32	25	+7	33
7	Nottingham Forest	22	9	3	10	27	35	−8	30
8	Sunderland	22	6	6	10	28	35	−7	24
9	Ipswich Town	22	6	5	11	26	42	−16	23

Source: WSL 2 League Table
Rules for classification: 1) Points; 2) Goal difference; 3) Number of goals scored

==== Results summary ====
Overall								Home						Away					
Pld	W	D	L	GF	GA	GD	Pts	W	D	L	GF	GA	GD	W	D	L	GF	GA	GD
22	9	3	10	27	35	−8	30	5	0	6	16	19	−3	4	3	4	11	16	−5

Source: Soccerway

==== Results by round ====
Round	1	2	3	4	5	6	7	8	9	10	11	12	13	14	15	16	17	18	19	20	21	22
Ground	H	A	H	A	H	A	A	H	A	H	A	H	H	A	H	A	A	H	H	A	A	H
Result	L	W	L	W	W	L	W	L	D	W	L	L	W	L	L	D	L	W	W	D	W	L
Position	7	7	9	4	3	6	4	4	5	4	6	7	6	7	7	7	7	8	7	7	7	7
Points	0	3	3	6	9	9	12	12	13	16	16	16	19	19	19	20	20	23	26	27	30	30

Source: Soccerway
A = Away; H = Home; W = Win; D = Draw; L = Loss

==== Matches ====
Win Draw Loss Fixtures

7 September 2025 1	Nottingham Forest	1–2	Newcastle United	West Bridgford
14:00 BST	Smith 51'; Boye-Hlorkah (yellow card) 90'	Report	Murphy 7' (yellow card) 85'; Pike 26'; Moan (yellow card) 52'; Kelly (yellow card) 59'	Stadium: City Ground; Attendance: 1,880; Referee: Abby Dearden

14 September 2025 2	Ipswich Town	0–1	Nottingham Forest	Myland
14:00 BST		Report	García 48' (yellow card) 77'; Almqvist (yellow card) 90+7'	Stadium: JobServe Community Stadium; Attendance: 1,462; Referee: Oliver Mackey

21 September 2025 3	Nottingham Forest	1–2	Crystal Palace	West Bridgford
14:00 BST	Boye-Hlorkah 90+3'	Report	Vanhaevermaet 18'; Larkin (yellow card) 24'; Howat 32'	Stadium: City Ground; Attendance: 1,158; Referee: Ruby Sykes

27 September 2025 4	Bristol City	1–2	Nottingham Forest	Bristol
19:00 BST	Sáez 26'; Ingle (red card) 43'; Bentley (yellow card) 65'; Lawley (yellow card) 90+4'	Report	Almqvist (yellow card) 45+2'; Thomas (yellow card) 59', (goal) 76'; Bentley 79' (o.g.)	Stadium: Ashton Gate; Attendance: 1,278; Referee: Aaron Ford

5 October 2025 5	Nottingham Forest	4–1	Portsmouth	West Bridgford
14:00 BST	García (yellow card) 15'; Stapleton 57'; Boye-Hlorkah 77'; Claypole 90+3'; Olding 90+6'	Report	Hornby 12'	Stadium: City Ground; Attendance: 1,061; Referee: Laura van Lier

12 October 2025 6	Durham	3–0	Nottingham Forest	Durham
12:00 BST	Lambert 5'; Hepple 6'; Speckmaier 23'; Salicki (yellow card) 53'; Pritchard (yellow card) 90+2'	Report	Rodgers (yellow card) 40'	Stadium: Maiden Castle Sports Centre; Attendance: 804; Referee: Alice Parker

2 November 2025 7	Southampton	2–3	Nottingham Forest	Southampton
14:00 GMT	Bashford 45+2'; Simpson 71'	Report	García 41' (yellow card) 46'; Stapleton (yellow card) 53'; Green (yellow card) 82'; Wellings 84', 86'	Stadium: St Mary's Stadium; Attendance: 2,293; Referee: Amy Fearn

9 November 2025 8	Nottingham Forest	0–3	Birmingham City	West Bridgford
14:00 GMT	Stapleton (yellow card) 35' (red card) 81'; Green (yellow card) 79'	Report	Sarri 41', 82' (pen.); Cornet (yellow card) 70'; Louis 90+1'	Stadium: City Ground; Attendance: 1,221; Referee: Lucy May

16 November 2025 9	Sheffield United	0–0	Nottingham Forest	Sheffield
13:00 GMT	Devlin (yellow card) 41'	Report		Stadium: Bramall Lane; Attendance: 804; Referee: Jodie Hunter

7 December 2025 10	Nottingham Forest	3–1	Sunderland	West Bridgford
14:00 GMT	Boye-Hlorkah 19', 87' (yellow card) 90+6'; Claypole 31'; Stapleton (yellow card) 38'	Report	Scarr 69'	Stadium: City Ground; Attendance: 1,007; Referee: Levi Gray

21 December 2025 11	Charlton Athletic	2–1	Nottingham Forest	Charlton
14:00 GMT	Bradley (yellow card) 37'; N'Dow (yellow card) 55'; Muya 75'; Bissell 90+8'	Report	Claypole 48'; Brougham (yellow card) 59' (red card) 84'	Stadium: The Valley; Attendance: 696; Referee: Alice Parker

11 January 2026 12	Nottingham Forest	2–4	Bristol City	West Bridgford
14:00 GMT	Rose 20'; Hamilton (yellow card) 43'; Boye-Hlorkah 85'	Report	Hed 2' (o.g.); Ward 9'; Hardy 60'; Gale 83'	Stadium: City Ground; Attendance: 1,093; Referee: Amy Fearn

25 January 2026 13	Nottingham Forest	1–0	Sheffield United	West Bridgford
14:00 GMT	Wellings 17'; Almqvist (yellow card) 27'; Hamilton (yellow card) 87'	Report	Bristow (yellow card) 33'; O'Rourke (yellow card) 45+3'; Reavill (yellow card) 84'	Stadium: City Ground; Attendance: 905; Referee: Julia Kings

1 February 2026 14	Birmingham City	5–1	Nottingham Forest	Bordesley
14:00 GMT	Cornet (yellow card) 11'; Brougham 22' (o.g.); Lindström (yellow card) 39' (goal) 72', 75', 78'; Leidhammar 47'	Report	Almqvist (yellow card) 12'; Omewa 45'; Hed (yellow card) 53'; Brougham (yellow card) 90+1'	Stadium: St. Andrew's @ Knighthead Park; Attendance: 1,553; Referee: Joanne Horwood

8 February 2026 15	Nottingham Forest	0–2	Charlton Athletic	West Bridgford
14:00 GMT	Omewa (yellow card) 48'; Kiernan (yellow card) 65'; Brougham (yellow card) 90+2'; Mustaki (yellow card) 90+5'	Report	Fitzgerald 19', 23'	Stadium: City Ground; Attendance: 1,102; Referee: Fabio Roque

11 March 2026 16	Sunderland	1–1	Nottingham Forest	Hetton-le-Hole
19:00 GMT	Kitching 35'; Sheva (yellow card) 69'; Griffiths (yellow card) 80'; Dale (yellow card) 83'; Lambourne (yellow card) 90+3'	Report	Claypole 90+6'	Stadium: Eppleton Colliery Welfare Ground; Attendance: 210; Referee: Megan Wilson
Note: Match postponed from 15 February 2026

15 March 2026 17	Crystal Palace	1–0	Nottingham Forest	Sutton
14:00 GMT	Everett 9'; Blanchard (yellow card) 67'	Report		Stadium: VBS Community Stadium; Attendance: 714; Referee: Francesca Catchpole

22 March 2026 18	Nottingham Forest	2–0	Ipswich Town	West Bridgford
14:00 GMT	Omewa 28'; Brougham (yellow card) 35'; Boye-Hlorkah 47'	Report		Stadium: City Ground; Attendance: 1,576; Referee: Lauren Impey

29 March 2026 19	Nottingham Forest	2–1	Durham	West Bridgford
14:00 BST	Omewa 14' (yellow card) 60'; Boye-Hlorkah 20'; Brougham (yellow card) 90+1'	Report	Agg 30'; Watson (yellow card) 90'	Stadium: City Ground; Attendance: 1,395; Referee: Adewunmi Soneye

5 April 2026 20	Newcastle United	1–1	Nottingham Forest	Gateshead
14:00 BST	Torpey (yellow card) 38'; Nobbs 90+1'	Report	Murphy 16'; Smith (yellow card) 38'	Stadium: Gateshead International Stadium; Attendance: 2,276; Referee: Fabio Roque

26 April 2026 21	Portsmouth	0–1	Nottingham Forest	Portsmouth
14:00 BST		Report	Brougham 41'	Stadium: Fratton Park; Attendance: 1,278; Referee: Aimee Keir

3 May 2026 22	Nottingham Forest	0–3	Southampton	West Bridgford
15:00 BST		Report	McAlonie 1' (yellow card) 57'; Collett 26'; Simpson (yellow card) 65'; Bashford 75'; Brown (yellow card) 88'	Stadium: City Ground; Referee: Jodie Hunter

=== Women's FA Cup ===
==== Matches ====
Win Draw Loss Fixtures

13 December 2025 3	Wolverhampton Wanderers	1–2	Nottingham Forest	Hednesford
12:15 GMT	Merrick (yellow card) 35'; Marshall 58'	Report	Brougham 4'; Claypole 20'	Stadium: Keys Park; Attendance: 705; Referee: Francesca Catchpole

18 January 2026 4	Brighton & Hove Albion	2–0	Nottingham Forest	Crawley
13:00 GMT	Kafaji (yellow card) 15'; Haley 45+3' (pen.); Čanković 90+2'	Report		Stadium: Broadfield Stadium; Attendance: 916; Referee: Stacey Pearson

=== Women's League Cup ===
==== Matches ====
Win Draw Loss Fixtures

24 September 2025 Group stage	Nottingham Forest	2–1	Newcastle United	Mansfield
19:45 BST	Claypole 55'; Smith 58'; Thomas (yellow card) 90+4'	Report	Lumsden 54'	Stadium: One Call Stadium; Attendance: 258; Referee: Alice Parker

19 October 2025 Group stage	Everton	1–1 (4–3 p)	Nottingham Forest	Walton
14:00 BST	Gago 59'; Wheeler (yellow card) 79'	Report	Stapleton (yellow card) 14'; Claypole 56' (pen.)	Stadium: Goodison Park; Attendance: 1,500; Referee: Adewunmi Soneye
	Penalties
	Gago (penalty scored); Stenevik (penalty scored); Weir (penalty missed); Wheeler (penalty scored); Pacheco (penalty scored)		(penalty scored) Claypole; (penalty scored) Olding; (penalty missed) Wellings; (penalty scored) Green; (penalty missed) Boye-Hlorkah

22 November 2025 Group stage	Nottingham Forest	0–2	Manchester City	West Bridgford
14:00 GMT		Report	Clinton 32'; Hemp 38'	Stadium: City Ground; Attendance: 2,624; Referee: Lauren Impey

== Statistics ==
=== Overall ===
As of 2 May 2026

No.	Pos.	Player	League				FA Cup				League Cup				Total			
No.	Pos.	Player		Goal	Yellow card	Red card		Goal	Yellow card	Red card		Goal	Yellow card	Red card		Goal	Yellow card	Red card
1	GK	Emily Batty	22	0	0	0	2	0	0	0	2	0	0	0	26	0	0	0
2	DF	Jessie Stapleton	12 (3)	1	3	1	0 (1)	0	0	0	3	0	1	0	15 (4)	1	4	1
3	DF	Nat Johnson	0	0	0	0	0	0	0	0	0 (1)	0	0	0	0 (1)	0	0	0
4	DF	Georgia Brougham	16	1	7	1	2	1	0	0	1	0	0	0	19	2	7	1
5	DF	Chloe Mustaki	20	0	1	0	2	0	0	0	2	0	0	0	24	0	1	0
6	FW	Deanne Rose	9 (8)	1	0	0	1 (1)	0	0	0	0 (1)	0	0	0	10 (10)	1	0	0
7	FW	Vivienne Lia	3 (7)	0	0	0	0 (1)	0	0	0	1	0	0	0	4 (8)	0	0	0
8	MF	Amy Rodgers	19 (2)	0	1	0	2	0	0	0	3	0	0	0	24 (2)	0	1	0
9	FW	Melissa Johnson	0	0	0	0	0	0	0	0	0	0	0	0	0	0	0	0
10	FW	Aimee Claypole	7 (10)	4	0	0	2	1	0	0	3	2	0	0	12 (10)	7	0	0
11	MF	Tove Almqvist	4 (11)	0	4	0	2	0	0	0	1 (1)	0	0	0	7 (12)	0	4	0
12	DF	Ebba Hed	19	0	1	0	2	0	0	0	2 (1)	0	0	0	23 (1)	0	1	0
13	MF	Rachel Rowe	14 (4)	0	0	0	2	0	0	0	1	0	0	0	17 (4)	0	0	0
14	FW	Charlie Wellings	4 (10)	3	0	0	0 (1)	0	0	0	0 (1)	0	0	0	4 (12)	3	0	0
15	MF	Hollie Olding	2 (8)	1	0	0	0	0	0	0	1 (1)	0	0	0	3 (9)	1	0	0
16	DF	Mollie Green	4 (3)	0	2	0	0	0	0	0	2	0	0	0	6 (3)	0	2	0
17	MF	Freya Thomas	9 (1)	1	1	0	0	0	0	0	2 (1)	0	1	0	11 (2)	1	2	0
18	DF	Caragh Hamilton	5 (8)	0	2	0	1 (1)	0	0	0	1 (2)	0	0	0	7 (11)	0	2	0
19	FW	Joy Omewa	9	3	2	0	0	0	0	0	0	0	0	0	9	3	2	0
20	DF	Issy Hobson	0	0	0	0	0	0	0	0	1	0	0	0	1	0	0	0
20	GK	Rebekah Dowsett	0	0	0	0	0	0	0	0	0	0	0	0	0	0	0	0
21	FW	Nahikari García	8 (2)	2	3	0	1	0	0	0	1 (2)	0	0	0	10 (4)	2	3	0
22	FW	Casey Howe	0	0	0	0	0	0	0	0	0	0	0	0	0	0	0	0
23	DF	Kirsty Smith	10 (2)	1	1	0	1	0	0	0	2	1	0	0	13 (3)	2	1	0
24	DF	Cerys Brown	9	0	0	0	0	0	0	0	0	0	0	0	9	0	0	0
26	FW	Libby Smith	0 (2)	0	0	0	0	0	0	0	0	0	0	0	0 (2)	0	0	0
27	FW	Leanne Kiernan	7 (2)	0	1	0	0	0	0	0	0	0	0	0	7 (2)	0	1	0
29	GK	Georgie Ferguson	0	0	0	0	0	0	0	0	1	0	0	0	1	0	0	0
31	MF	Alana Murphy	8	1	0	0	0	0	0	0	0	0	0	0	8	1	0	0
33	FW	Chantelle Boye-Hlorkah	22	7	2	0	2	0	0	0	3	0	0	0	27	7	2	0
35	GK	Sophia Poor	0	0	0	0	0	0	0	0	0	0	0	0	0	0	0	0
39	FW	Olivia Johnson	0	0	0	0	0	0	0	0	0	0	0	0	0	0	0	0

=== Goalscorers ===
As of 2 May 2026

Rank	No.	Pos.	Player	League	FA Cup	League Cup	Total
1	33	FW	Chantelle Boye-Hlorkah	7	0	0	7
1	10	FW	Aimee Claypole	4	1	2	7
3	19	FW	Joy Omewa	3	0	0	3
3	14	FW	Charlie Wellings	3	0	0	3
5	4	DF	Georgia Brougham	1	1	0	2
5	21	FW	Nahikari García	2	0	0	2
5	23	DF	Kirsty Smith	1	0	1	2
8	31	MF	Alana Murphy	1	0	0	1
8	15	MF	Hollie Olding	1	0	0	1
8	6	FW	Deanne Rose	1	0	0	1
8	2	DF	Jessie Stapleton	1	0	0	1
8	17	MF	Freya Thomas	1	0	0	1
Own Goals				1	0	0	1
Totals				27	2	3	32

=== Assists ===
As of 2 May 2026

Rank	No.	Pos.	Player	League	FA Cup	League Cup	Total
1	13	MF	Rachel Rowe	3	0	0	3
1	5	DF	Chloe Mustaki	3	0	0	3
3	12	DF	Ebba Hed	0	0	2	2
4	11	MF	Tove Almqvist	1	0	0	1
4	10	FW	Chantelle Boye-Hlorkah	1	0	0	1
4	24	DF	Cerys Brown	1	0	0	1
4	33	FW	Aimee Claypole	1	0	0	1
4	21	FW	Nahikari García	1	0	0	1
4	7	FW	Vivienne Lia	1	0	0	1
4	8	MF	Amy Rodgers	1	0	0	1
4	23	DF	Kirsty Smith	1	0	0	1
Totals				14	0	2	16

=== Clean sheets ===
As of 2 May 2026

Rank	No.	Pos.	Player	League	FA Cup	League Cup	Total
1	1	GK	Emily Batty	5	0	0	5
Totals				5	0	0	5

== Awards ==
=== E.ON Next Women's Player of the Month ===
Awarded by an online vote of supporters on the official Nottingham Forest F.C. website.

Month	Player	Ref.
September	Freya Thomas	
October	Aimee Claypole	
November	Emily Batty	
December	Aimee Claypole	
January	Amy Rodgers	
February	Tove Almqvist	
March	Chantelle Boye-Hlorkah	
