= 2026–27 Women's Super League 2 =

Women's Super League 2
- Season: 2026–27
- Dates: 4 September 2026 – 23 May 2027
- Matches: 48
- Goals: 160 (3.33 per match)
- Top goalscorer: Rio Hardy; Amber Hughes; Martha Thomas (7 goals each)
- Best goalkeeper: Anna Tamminen (5 clean sheets)
- Biggest home win: Newcastle United 4–0 Leicester City (27 September 2026)
- Biggest away win: Burnley 0–5 Southampton (15 November 2026)
- Highest scoring: Burnley 3–4 Sheffield United (25 October 2026)
- Longest winning run: 5 games Newcastle United
- Longest unbeaten run: 8 games Newcastle United; Nottingham Forest
- Longest winless run: 8 games Burnley; Durham
- Longest losing run: 8 games Durham
- Highest attendance: 5,705; Sunderland 1–1 Newcastle United (15 November 2026)
- Lowest attendance: 339; Sunderland 4–1 Bristol City (6 September 2026)
- All statistics correct as of 15 November 2026.

The 2026–27 Women's Super League 2 is the second season of the Women's Super League 2 (WSL2) since it was reverted to the WSL2 name, and the 12th since the creation of the division in 2014. The season began on 4 September 2026 and will conclude on 23 May 2027.

This is the first season in which a pre-qualifying match will be played between the second- and third-placed WSL2 teams, with the winner advancing to face the 13th-placed Women's Super League (WSL) side in a promotion/relegation play-off final.

== Teams ==
Location of clubs for the 2026–27 season

Twelve teams compete in the WSL2 for the 2026–27 season, the same number as the previous season.

In June 2025, it was announced that the WSL would be expanding to 14 teams for the 2026–27 season, with two WSL2 teams promoted. Birmingham City and Crystal Palace were promoted as 2025–26 Women's Super League 2 winner and runner-up.

Burnley, winners of the 2025–26 Northern Premier Division, and Watford, winners of the 2025–26 Southern Premier Division, were promoted to the WSL2. Their promotion marked Burnley's first spell in the WSL2, while Watford returned to the league after being relegated at the end of the 2023–24 season. There was a one game play-off between Premier Division runners-up Wolverhampton Wanderers and Plymouth Argyle to decide the third team promoted. Wolves were the eventual winners and made their WSL2 debut.

On 23 May 2026, Charlton Athletic played off against Leicester City in a promotion/relegation match. Charlton won the game after a penalty shoot-out to secure promotion to the WSL, while Leicester were relegated, returning to the WSL2 for the first time since they gained promotion at the end of the 2020–21 season.

On 26 April 2026, after two seasons in the WSL2, Portsmouth were relegated.

Team	Location	Ground	Capacity	2025–26 season
Bristol City	Bristol (Ashton Gate)	Ashton Gate	27,000	4th
Burnley	Burnley	Turf Moor	21,944	WNL North, 1st
Durham	Durham	Maiden Castle	1,800	10th
Ipswich Town	Colchester	Colchester Community Stadium	10,105	9th
Leicester City	Leicester	King Power Stadium	32,212	WSL, 12th
Newcastle United	Gateshead	Gateshead International Stadium	11,800	6th
Nottingham Forest	Nottingham (West Bridgford)	City Ground	30,404	7th
Sheffield United	Sheffield	Bramall Lane	32,050	11th
Southampton	Eastleigh	Silverlake Stadium	5,250	5th
Sunderland	Hetton-le-Hole	Eppleton CW	2,500	8th
Watford	Watford	Vicarage Road	22,220	WNL South, 1st
Wolverhampton Wanderers	Telford (Wellington)	New Bucks Head	6,300	WNL North, 2nd

=== Personnel and kits ===
Team	Manager	Captain	Kit manufacturer	Shirt sponsor	Shirt sponsor (sleeve)	Shirt sponsor (back)	Shorts sponsor
Bristol City	(England) Charlotte Healy	(England) Emily Syme	O'Neills	Guinness	Exacta Technologies	Thatchers Cider	None
Burnley	(United States) Jackie Bachteler	(Scotland) Christie Harrison-Murray	Castore	Finotive One	Sure	None	Chatbooks
Durham	(Scotland) Willie Kirk	(England) Sarah Wilson	Hummel	Vision for Education	MKM	None	None
Ipswich Town	(England) David Wright	(England) Maria Boswell	Umbro	Halo Service Solutions	Play	MSC	None
Leicester City	(England) Rick Passmoor	(England) Sam Tierney	Adidas	King Power	Bia Saigon	None	None
Newcastle United	(Australia) Tanya Oxtoby	(Scotland) Rachel McLauchlan	Adidas	KNOX Hydrate	Noon	None	None
Nottingham Forest	(England) Tom Mallinson	(England) Georgia Brougham	Adidas	E.ON Next	Ideagen	None	None
Sheffield United	(England) Stephen Healy	(England) Mollie Rouse	Erreà	Midnite	Village Hotel Club	None	None
Southampton	(England) Simon Parker	(England) Emma Harries	Puma	Starling Bank	P&O Cruises	Southampton Solent University	Bargate Homes
Sunderland	(England) Melanie Reay	(Wales) Rhiannon Roberts	Hummel	Total Construction NE	Stephen Hope Wealth	Nuby	A.Jay Brickwork
Watford	(England) Renée Hector	(England) Megan Chandler	Kelme	MrQ.com	University of Hertfordshire	None	Sound of Gol
Wolverhampton Wanderers	(England) Daniel McNamara	(England) Anna Morphet	Sudu	Midnite	Wolf Competitions	Reconomy	None

=== Managerial changes ===
Team	Outgoing manager	Manner of departure	Date of vacancy	Position in table	Incoming manager	Date of appointment
Burnley	(Scotland) Ross Wallace (interim)	End of interim period	2 May 2026	Pre season	(United States) Jackie Bachteler	24 July 2026
Durham	(England) Neil Redfearn (interim)	End of interim period	2 May 2026	Pre season	(Scotland) Willie Kirk	7 July 2026
Nottingham Forest	(England) Carly Davies	Mutual agreement	12 May 2026	Pre season	(England) Tom Mallinson	4 June 2026

== League table ==
Pos	Team	Pld	W	D	L	GF	GA	GD	Pts	Qualification
1	Newcastle United	8	6	2	0	19	3	+16	20	Promotion to the WSL (Note: Dependent on obtaining a licence.)
2	Sunderland	8	5	2	1	16	8	+8	17	Qualification for pre-qualifying play-off
3	Ipswich Town	8	5	2	1	13	7	+6	17	Qualification for pre-qualifying play-off
4	Bristol City	8	5	1	2	17	11	+6	16	
5	Nottingham Forest	8	3	5	0	15	9	+6	14	
6	Southampton	8	3	4	1	16	7	+9	13	
7	Wolverhampton Wanderers	8	3	1	4	16	18	−2	10	
8	Watford	8	2	3	3	12	15	−3	9	
9	Leicester City	8	2	2	4	9	14	−5	8	
10	Sheffield United	8	2	0	6	13	21	−8	6	
11	Burnley	8	0	2	6	4	19	−15	2	Relegation to Northern or Southern Premier Division
12	Durham	8	0	0	8	10	28	−18	0	Relegation to Northern or Southern Premier Division

Updated to match(es) played on 15 November 2026. Source: WSL 2 League Table
Rules for classification: 1) Points; 2) Goal difference; 3) Number of goals scored

== Results ==
Home \ Away	BRI	BUR	DUR	IPS	LEI	NEW	NOT	SHU	SOU	SUN	WAT	WOL
Bristol City		4 Apr	1 May	28 Mar	10 Jan	0–1	21 Dec	31 Jan	2–1	14 Mar	7 Feb	4–2
Burnley	0–0		10 Jan	22 Jan	7 Feb	2 May	11 Apr	3–4	0–5	1–2	14 Mar	27 Mar
Durham	24 Jan	8 May		20 Dec	21 Mar	0–3	1–2	27 Jan	1–3	1–4	11 Apr	14 Feb
Ipswich Town	1–2	21 Mar	7 Feb		4 Apr	10 Jan	1–1	14 Mar	2 May	3–1	27 Jan	3–1
Leicester City	11 Apr	20 Dec	4–2	0–1		31 Jan	27 Jan	28 Mar	2–2	2 May	0–1	14 Mar
Newcastle United	8 May	3–0	14 Mar	11 Apr	4–0		7 Feb	4–1	24 Jan	28 Mar	20 Dec	2–0
Nottingham Forest	14 Feb	2–0	4 Apr	31 Jan	1–1	2–2		10 Jan	14 Mar	24 Jan	2–2	2 May
Sheffield United	1–3	13 Feb	4–1	1–2	0–1	20 Mar	8 May		7 Feb	20 Dec	23 Jan	10 Apr
Southampton	27 Jan	31 Jan	28 Mar	0–0	8 May	14 Feb	1–1	4–1		11 Apr	21 Mar	20 Dec
Sunderland	4–1	27 Jan	31 Jan	14 Feb	3–1	0–0	21 Mar	4 Apr	0–0		8 May	10 Jan
Watford	1–5	0–0	4–2	1–2	12 Feb	4 Apr	26 Mar	1 May	10 Jan	1–2		31 Jan
Wolverhampton Wanderers	21 Mar	3–0	4–2	8 May	24 Jan	27 Jan	1–4	3–1	4 Apr	7 Feb	2–2	

Updated to match(es) played on 15 November 2026. Source: Results and Fixtures
Legend: Blue = home team win; Yellow = draw; Red = away team win.

== Season statistics ==
As of 15 November 2026

=== Top scorers ===
Rank	Player	Club	Goals
1	(England) Rio Hardy	Bristol City	7
1	(England) Amber Hughes	Wolverhampton Wanderers	7
1	(Scotland) Martha Thomas	Newcastle United	7
4	(Wales) Elise Hughes	Sunderland	5
5	(England) Princess Ademiluyi	Ipswich Town	4
5	(Ghana) Chantelle Boye-Hlorkah	Nottingham Forest	4
5	(England) Ellie Brazil	Southampton	4
5	(Norway) Tuva Espås	Nottingham Forest	4
5	(England) Freya Jupp	Southampton	4
10	9 players		3

=== Clean sheets ===
Rank	Player	Club	Clean sheets
1	(Finland) Anna Tamminen	Newcastle United	5
2	(Republic of Ireland) Grace Moloney	Southampton	3
2	(Wales) Safia Middleton-Patel	Watford	2
2	(Canada) Lysianne Proulx	Ipswich Town	2
2	(England) Fran Stenson	Sunderland	2
5	(England) Fran Bentley	Bristol City	1
5	(Northern Ireland) Jackie Burns	Burnley	1
5	(England) Katie Cox	Nottingham Forest	1
5	(Republic of Ireland) Katie Keane	Leicester City	1
5	(England) Kirstie Levell	Burnley	1
5	(England) Emily Orman	Wolverhampton Wanderers	1
5	(England) Kayla Rendell	Newcastle United	1

=== Discipline ===
	Most yellow cards	Total	Most red cards	Total	Ref.
Player	(England) Brooke Aspin (Bristol City) (England) Grace Ayre (Durham) (England) Jessica Brown (Sunderland) (England) Mary Corbyn (Sunderland) (England) Aimee Palmer (Ipswich Town)	3	(England) Eva Gray (Watford) (France) Tess Laplecette (Sunderland) (England) Lucy Lyon (Watford) (Sweden) Emilia Pelgander (Leicester City)	1	
Club	Bristol City	17	Watford	2	

== Awards ==
=== Monthly awards ===
Month	Manager of the Month		Player of the Month		Goal of the Month		Save of the Month		Ref.
Month	Manager	Club	Player	Club	Player	Club	Player	Club	Ref.
September	(Australia) Tanya Oxtoby	Newcastle United	(Scotland) Martha Thomas	Newcastle United	(Ghana) Chantelle Boye-Hlorkah	Nottingham Forest	(Wales) Safia Middleton-Patel	Watford	
October	(England) David Wright	Ipswich Town	(England) Princess Ademiluyi	Ipswich Town	(Republic of Ireland) Aoibheann Clancy	Watford	(England) Emily Orman	Wolverhampton Wanderers	
