= Deanne Rose =

Canadian soccer player

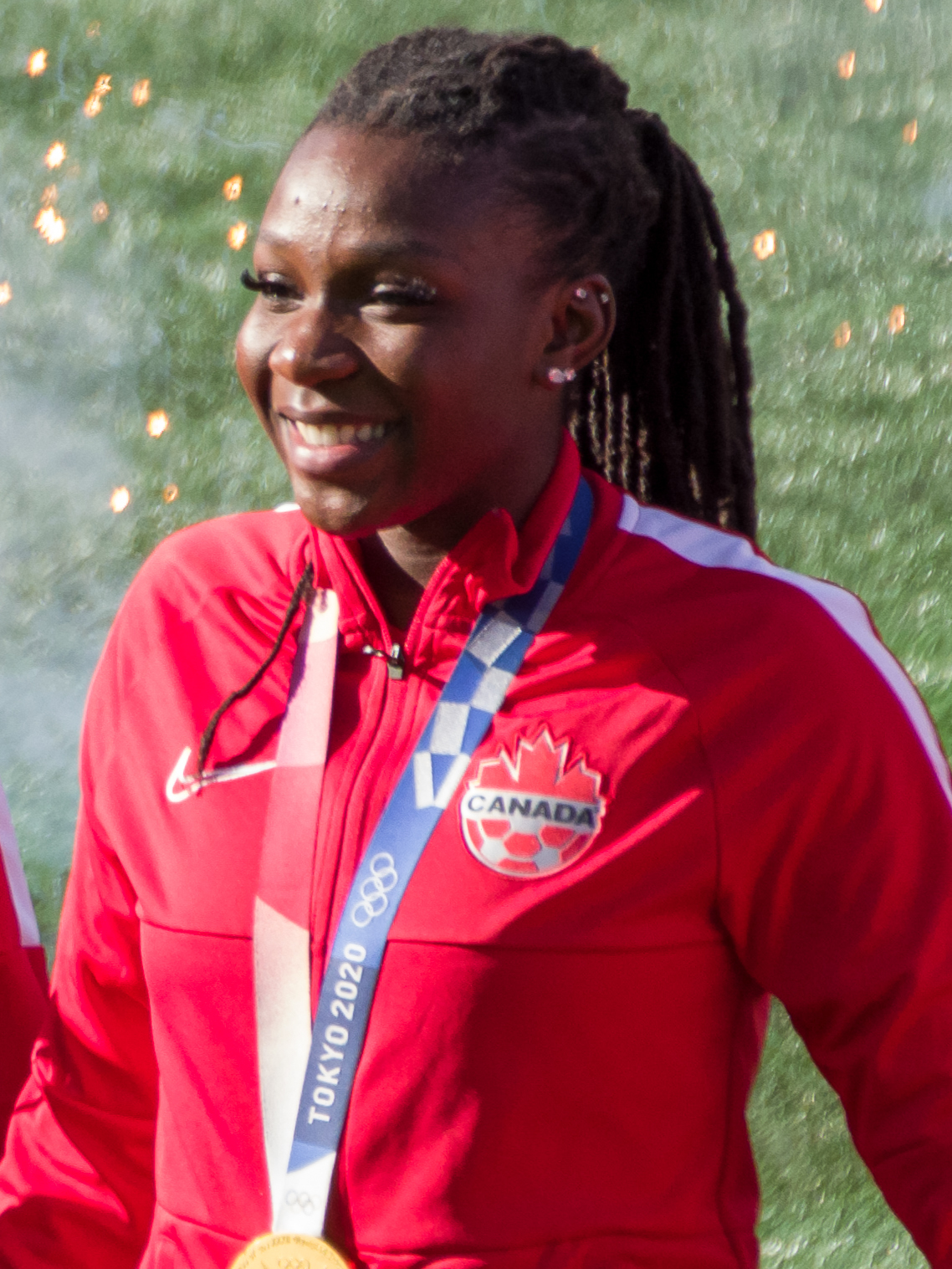
- Rose with her 2020 Olympic gold medal in 2021

Personal information
- Full name: Deanne Cynthia Rose
- Date of birth: March 3, 1999 (age 27)
- Place of birth: New Tecumseth, Ontario, Canada
- Height: 1.60 m (5 ft 3 in)
- Position: Forward

Team information
- Current team: Nottingham Forest
- Number: 6

Youth career
- Alliston SC
- Bradford SC
- 2015–2017: Scarborough GS United

College career
Years	Team	Apps	(Gls)
2017–2021	Florida Gators	51	(19)

Senior career*
Years	Team	Apps	(Gls)
2018	DeRo United FC	1	(1)
2021–2023	Reading	23	(4)
2023–2025	Leicester City	29	(0)
2025–	Nottingham Forest	19	(1)

International career^{‡}
2016	Canada U-17	3	(1)
2016	Canada U-20	3	(0)
2015–	Canada	88	(11)
Medal record
Women's football
Representing Canada
CONCACAF W Championship
Runner-up	2018 United States
Olympic Games
Gold medal – first place	2020	Team
Bronze medal – third place	2016	Team
- * Club domestic league appearances and goals as of 15 November 2026 ‡ National team caps and goals as of April 8, 2025

Deanne Cynthia Rose (born March 3, 1999) is a Canadian professional soccer player who plays as a forward for Women's Super League 2 club Nottingham Forest and the Canada national team.

In August 2016, Rose helped Canada win their second Olympic bronze medal after scoring the game-opening goal during the third-place match against Brazil. In August 2021, she helped Canada win the gold medal at the Tokyo Olympics.

== Early life ==
Born in New Tecumseth, Ontario to Jamaican parents, Rose began playing soccer at the age of four. Raised in Alliston, Rose attended Ernest Cumberland Elementary School in Alliston, Ontario, and later St. Thomas Aquinas Catholic Secondary School in Tottenham, Ontario. She played club soccer for Scarborough GS United. In 2015, she was one of six players to be nominated for the BMO Canadian Player of the Year (Canada Soccer Women's U-17 Program).

== College career ==
Rose joined the Gators in 2017. On August 20, she scored her first goal in a 5–0 win over Troy. As a freshman, she recorded 9 goals, including five game-winners, and provided 3 assists.

== Club career ==
In 2018, she played a match with DeRo United FC in League1 Ontario, scoring on May 19 against FC London.

In January 2021, Rose was selected 10th overall in the 2021 NWSL Draft by the North Carolina Courage but did not join the team. In December 2021, North Carolina traded Rose's NWSL playing rights to the Orlando Pride during the 2022 NWSL Draft in exchange for a third-round pick.

On July 28, 2021, Rose signed a two-year contract with Reading of the English FA Women's Super League. In her first game of the 2022-23 season, she ruptured her Achilles tendon, forcing her to miss significant playing time.

On 8 September 2023, Rose signed a two-year contract with Leicester City.

On August 19, 2025 Nottingham Forest Women F.C. announced they had signed Rose to a one year contract in advance of their first season in the Women's Super League 2

== International career ==
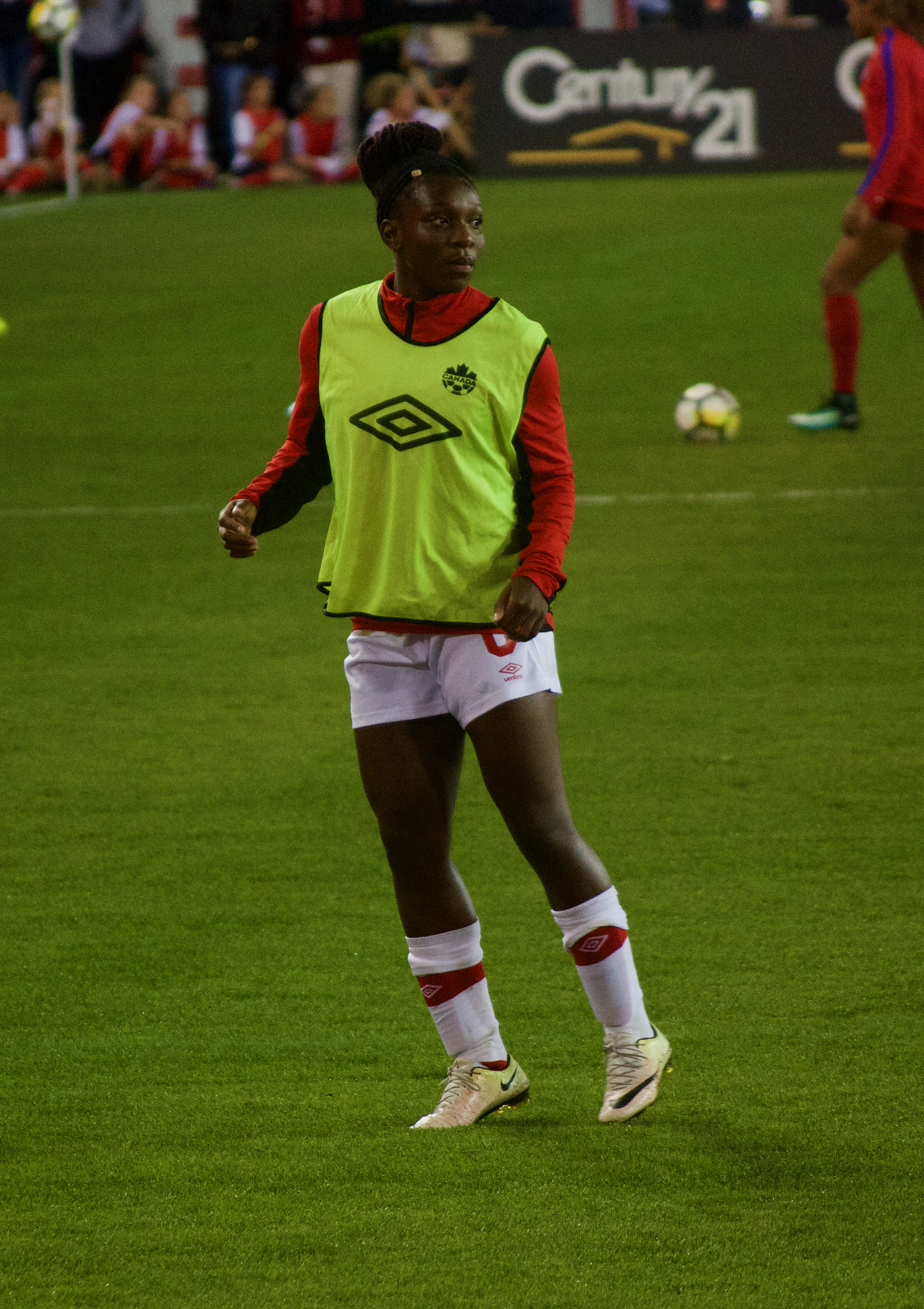

Rose earned her first cap for Canada's senior national team in December 2015 at the age of 16. In February 2016, she scored her first two goals for the team against Guyana helping Canada win 5–0 during the group stage of the 2016 CONCACAF Women's Olympic Qualifying Championship. She scored her third tournament goal during the semifinal against Costa Rica helping Canada win 3–1 and qualify for the 2016 Rio Olympics. Canada advanced to the final where they were defeated by the United States 2–0.

In August 2016, she helped Canada win their second Olympic bronze medal after scoring the game-opening goal during the third-place match against Brazil, in which Canada won 2–1. Moreover, she became the youngest female Olympic goalscorer, aged 17 years and 169 days. On May 25, 2019, she was named to the roster for the 2019 FIFA Women's World Cup.

Rose was called up to the Canada squad for the delayed 2020 Summer Olympics. In August 2021, during the finals of the 2020 Olympic Games in Tokyo, Japan, Rose scored the tying penalty during the shootout. The Canadians went on to win the gold medal, becoming the first Canadian soccer team to do so in 117 years.

Rose was called up to the Canada squad for the 2022 CONCACAF W Championship, where Canada finished as runners-up.

Rose was called up to the 23-player Canada squad for the 2023 FIFA Women's World Cup.

Rose was called up to the Canada squad for the 2024 CONCACAF W Gold Cup, which Canada finished as semifinalists.

Rose was called up to the Canada squad for the 2024 Summer Olympics.

== Career statistics ==
=== Club ===
As of match played 18 November 2026.

Club	Season	League			National cup (Note: Includes Women's FA Cup)		League cup (Note: Includes FA Women's League Cup)		Total	
Club	Season	Division	Apps	Goals	Apps	Goals	Apps	Goals	Apps	Goals
Reading	2021–22	Women's Super League	21	4	2	1	3	0	26	5
Reading	2022–23	Women's Super League	2	0	0	0	0	0	2	0
Reading	Total		23	4	2	1	3	0	28	5
Leicester City	2023–24	Women's Super League	15	0	3	2	2	1	20	3
Leicester City	2024–25	Women's Super League	14	0	0	0	3	0	17	0
Leicester City	Total		29	0	3	2	5	1	37	3
Nottingham Forest	2025–26	Women's Super League 2	17	1	2	0	1	0	20	1
Nottingham Forest	2026–27	Women's Super League 2	2	0	0	0	4	1	6	1
Nottingham Forest	Total		19	1	2	0	5	1	26	2
Career total			71	5	7	3	13	2	91	10

=== International ===
As of match played April 8, 2025

Appearances and goals by national team and year
National team	Year	Apps	Goals
Canada	2015	3	0
Canada	2016	16	4
Canada	2017	11	3
Canada	2018	5	1
Canada	2019	8	0
Canada	2020	5	1
Canada	2021	17	1
Canada	2022	8	0
Canada	2023	4	1
Canada	2024	9	0
Canada	2025	2	0
Total		88	11

Scores and results list Canada's goal tally first, score column indicates score after each Rose goal.

List of international goals scored by Deanne Rose
No.	Date	Venue	Opponent	Score	Result	Competition
1	February 11, 2016	BBVA Compass Stadium	Guyana	1–0	5–0	2016 CONCACAF Women's Olympic Qualifier
2	February 11, 2016	BBVA Compass Stadium	Guyana	3–0	5–0	2016 CONCACAF Women's Olympic Qualifier
3	February 19, 2016	BBVA Compass Stadium	Costa Rica	3–1	3–1	2016 CONCACAF Women's Olympic Qualifier
4	August 19, 2016	Arena Corinthians	Brazil	1–0	2–1	2016 Summer Olympics
5	February 4, 2017	BC Place	Mexico	1–0	3–2	Friendly
6	April 9, 2017	Steigerwaldstadion	Germany	1–1	1–2	Friendly
7	June 11, 2017	BMO Field	Costa Rica	1–0	6–0	Friendly
8	October 8, 2018	H-E-B Park, Edinburg	Cuba	4–0	12–0	2018 CONCACAF Women's Championship
9	February 1, 2020	H-E-B Park, Edinburg	Jamaica	2–0	9–0	2020 CONCACAF Women's Olympic Qualifier
10	April 9, 2021	Leckwith Stadium	Wales	1–0	3–0	Friendly
11	October 31, 2023	Wanderers Grounds	Brazil	2–0	2–0	Friendly

== Honours ==
Canada

- Summer Olympics: 2021; bronze medal: 2016
- Algarve Cup: 2016

Individual

- Canadian U-17 Player of the Year: 2016
