= Codie Thomas =

English footballer (born 2006)

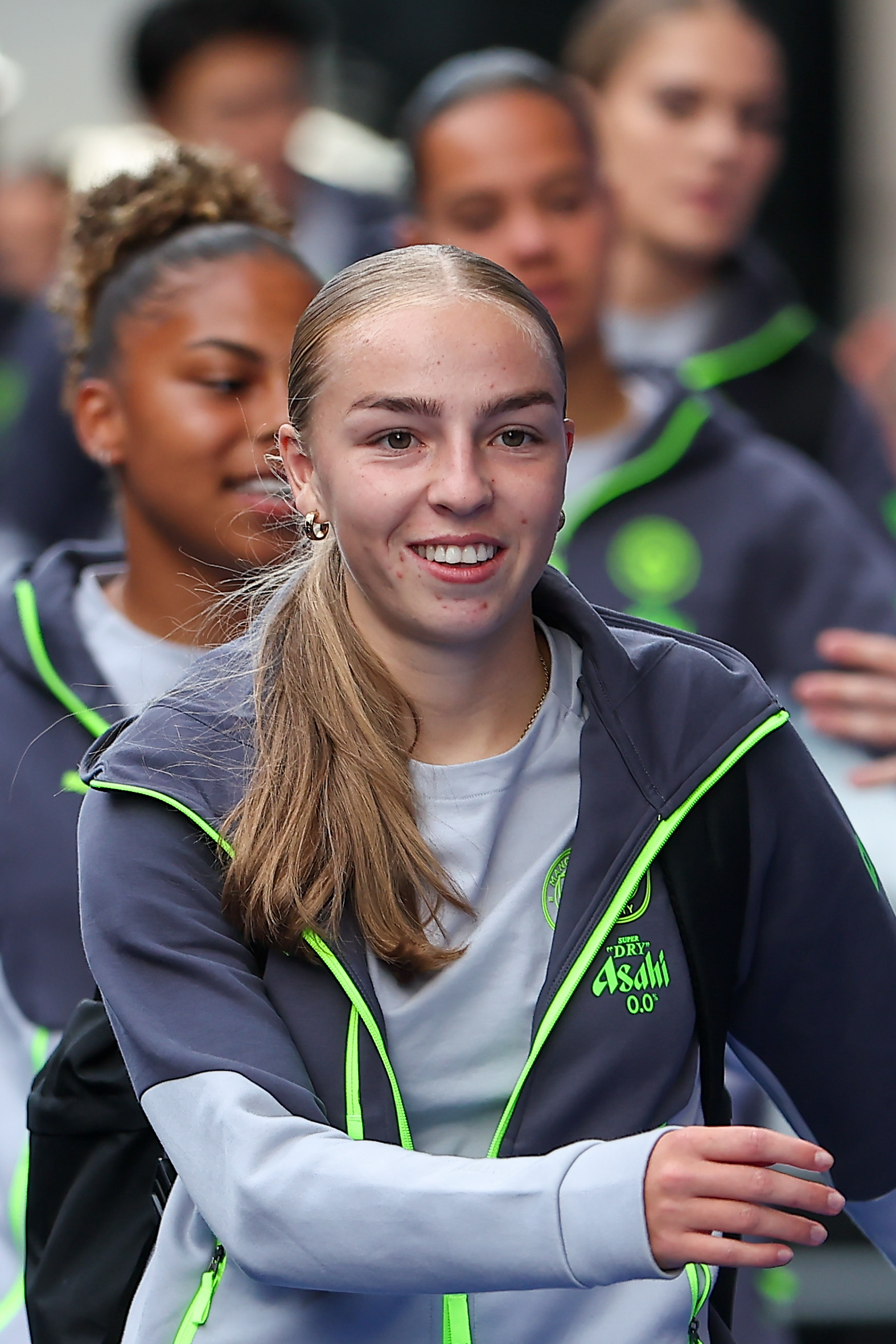
- Thomas in 2025

Personal information
- Full name: Codie Brooke Thomas
- Date of birth: 30 August 2006 (age 20)
- Place of birth: Stockport, England
- Position: Defender

Team information
- Current team: Nottingham Forest (on loan from Manchester City)
- Number: 16

Youth career
- 2016–2024: Manchester City
- 2023–2024: → AFC Fylde (dual registration)

Senior career*
Years	Team	Apps	(Gls)
2024–	Manchester City	1	(0)
2026	→ Glasgow City (loan)	6	(1)
2026–	→ Nottingham Forest (loan)	6	(0)

International career
2024	England U19	0	(0)
- * Club domestic league appearances and goals as of 15 November 2026

Codie Brooke Thomas (born 30 August 2006) is an English professional footballer who plays as a defender for Women's Super League 2 team Nottingham Forest, on loan from Manchester City. She has previously played with AFC Fylde (on a dual registration deal with Manchester City), and with Glasgow City on loan.

== Early life ==
Codie Thomas was born on 30 August 2006 in Stockport, England. She is a lifelong Manchester City fan.

== Youth career ==
In 2016, Thomas joined Manchester City's academy. During the 2023–24 season, Thomas spent time with AFC Fylde on a dual registration agreement. Ahead of the 2024–25 season, Thomas joined City's senior side on their pre-season tour to Australia, where she featured in friendly fixtures against Leicester City and Paris Saint-Germain.

== Club career ==
=== Manchester City ===
On 16 October 2024, Thomas made her competitive debut for Manchester City during a 2–3 Champions League victory over St. Pölten. On 4 December 2024, Thomas—alongside fellow academy graduate Lily Murphy—signed her first professional contract with City. In January 2025, during City's warm-weather training camp, Thomas suffered a hamstring injury which sidelined her for the rest of the 2024–25 season.

On 28 August 2025, Thomas signed a two-year contract extension with Manchester City, keeping her at the club until at least 2027. In September 2025, Thomas appeared as a substitute in City's 3–1 League Cup win over Everton, her first match played since January.

==== Loan to Glasgow City ====
On 5 February 2026, Thomas joined Scottish Women's Premier League (SWPL) side Glasgow City on loan for the remainder of the 2025–26 season. She made her club debut on 22 February 2026 as Glasgow beat Motherwell 0–4. With Glasgow City, Thomas won the Sky Sports Cup in March 2026. On 10 May 2026, Thomas scored her first goal for the side during a 3–2 league loss to Hibernian. On 31 May 2026, Glasgow City announced that Thomas would return to parent club Manchester City upon the expiration of her loan.

==== Loan to Nottingham Forest ====
On 23 July 2026, Manchester City announced that Thomas would spend the 2026–27 season on loan with Nottingham Forest. She made her WSL2 debut against Watford on 13 September 2026, coming on for right-back Cerys Brown.

== International career ==
On 20 November 2024, Thomas was called up to the England under-19 team for a series of 2025 Under-19 Euro qualifiers. She was an unused substitute in all three matches.

== Personal life ==
Thomas has stated she ‘‘want[s] to be the next Lucy Bronze.’’

In May 2025, Thomas was named Manchester City's PFA Community Champion (alongside Rúben Dias) for her work with the club's community project, City in the Community.

== Honours ==
=== Glasgow City ===
- Sky Sports Cup: 2025–26

=== Individual ===
- Manchester City PFA Community Champion: 2025
