= Simon Parker (football manager) =

English football coach

Personal information
- Date of birth: 9 March 1986 (age 40)

Team information
- Current team: Southampton FC Women (head coach)

Managerial career
- Years: Team
- 2016–2018: Southampton Women's FC
- 2020–2021: Lewes Women
- 2022–2023: SC Uniāo Torreense Women
- 2023–2025: Blackburn Rovers Women
- 2025–: Southampton FC Women

Simon Parker (born 9 March 1986) is an English professional football coach who is the head coach of Women's Super League 2 club Southampton.

== Coaching career ==
In 2016, Parker was head coach with Southampton Women's FC. During his time at the club, he won the league title and league cup in his first season and overall had a 89%-win rate.

On 17 December 2018, Parker joined Lewes as assistant. In January 2020, he stepped up to become head coach. On 12 October 2021, Lewes parted ways with Parker.

Parker joined Portuguese club SC Uniāo Torreense as head coach for the women's team on 7 October 2022.

On 17 July 2023, Parker joined Blackburn Rovers Women. Following the club's decision to withdraw from the Women's Super League 2 to take up a place in the fourth tier, on 30 June 2025, he left his role as head coach.

Parker was appointed head coach of Southampton FC Women on 4 July 2025.
