= Ilona Walta =

Finnish footballer (born 2006)

Personal information
- Full name: Ilona Aurora Walta
- Date of birth: 5 January 2006 (age 20)
- Place of birth: Vantaa, Finland
- Positions: Midfielder; forward

Team information
- Current team: Nottingham Forest
- Number: 18

Youth career
- HJK

Senior career*
Years	Team	Apps	(Gls)
2021–2023	HJK	34	(1)
2023	PK-35 Vantaa	14	(2)
2024	FC Honka	23	(14)
2025	Vittsjö GIK	23	(1)
2026	Molde FK	14	(2)
2026–	Nottingham Forest	3	(0)

International career^{‡}
2022	Finland U16	2	(2)
2021–2023	Finland U17	17	(5)
2024	Finland U18	2	(1)
2023–2025	Finland U19	20	(4)
2026–	Finland U23	1	(1)
- * Club domestic league appearances and goals as of 23 September 2026 ‡ National team caps and goals as of 30 December 2024

Ilona Walta (born 5 January 2006) is a Finnish professional footballer who plays as a midfielder or forward for Nottingham Forest in the Women's Super League 2.

== Club career ==
=== Honka ===
On 15 November 2023, Walta signed for FC Honka.

=== Vittsjö GIK ===
On 24 December 2024, Walta signed for Vittsjö GIK.

=== Molde FK ===
On 12 December 2025, Walta signed for Molde FK.

=== Nottingham Forest ===
On 27 August 2026, Walta signed for Nottingham Forest. She made her debut for the club against Ipswich in the first game of the WSL2 season on 6 September, coming on for Tuva Espas.

== Personal life ==
Her older brother Leo is also a Finnish international footballer, playing for LAFC, on loan from Swansea.

== Honours ==
Individual

- Kansallinen Liiga Player of the Month: July 2024
