= Katie Cox =

English footballer (born 2006)

Personal information
- Full name: Katie Jane Cox
- Date of birth: 28 April 2006 (age 20)
- Place of birth: Kingston upon Thames, England
- Height: 5 ft 11 in (1.80 m)
- Position: Goalkeeper

Team information
- Current team: Nottingham Forest (on loan from Chelsea)
- Number: 24

Youth career
- 2014–2024: Chelsea

Senior career*
Years	Team	Apps	(Gls)
2024–	Chelsea	0	(0)
2025–2026	→ Aberdeen (loan)	24	(0)
2026–	→ Nottingham Forest (loan)	4	(0)

International career^{‡}
- England U16
2022–2023	England U17	3	(0)
2023–2025	England U19	20	(0)
2025–	England U23	1	(0)
2026–	England U20	5	(0)
- * Club domestic league appearances and goals as of 8 November 2026 ‡ National team caps and goals as of 16:49, 3 August 2026 (UTC)

Katie Jane Cox (born 28 April 2006) is an English professional footballer who plays as a goalkeeper for Women's Super League 2 team Nottingham Forest, on loan from Chelsea, and the England under-20 and under-23 national teams.

She previously played on loan for Scottish Women's Premier League side Aberdeen, and represented England at the under-16, under-17, and under-19 age groups.

== Early life ==
Katie Jane Cox was born on 28 April 2006 in Kingston upon Thames. She has two brothers. Her older brother, Matthew Cox, is also a goalkeeper who came through Chelsea's academy. Cox's parents are both PE teachers, and her father, Mark, coaches rugby. She had a German Shorthaired Pointer called Lola who died during the 2024–25 season.

A multi-athlete, Cox also played basketball for England at multiple youth levels. She played for the Sevenoak Suns in the Women's British Basketball League. Cox gave up playing basketball in order to progress her football career. She also played rugby at county level, and holds a black belt in karate.

== Youth career ==
Cox joined Chelsea's academy age 8, and progressed through the team's youth sides. In the 2021–22 season, Cox was part of the academy team who won the FA Youth Cup. The following season, she also earned the PGA Cup title. In 2023, Cox lifted the WSL Academy League Cup with Chelsea, beating Manchester United's under-21 side in the final. In May 2024, she was awarded Chelsea's first-ever Women's Academy Player of the Year award.

== Club career ==
=== Chelsea, 2024– ===
On 23 August 2024, Cox signed her first professional contract with academy club Chelsea. The deal would run until summer 2026, with the option for an extra year. Cox spent her first year on the senior team working with experienced 'keepers Zećira Mušović and Hannah Hampton, stating that she ‘‘wouldn't want to be learning anywhere or from anyone else.’’ Described by Hampton as ‘‘an unbelievable shot-stopper’’, Cox was regularly named to Chelsea's match day squad — including for Champions League matches against Real Madrid, Manchester City, and Barcelona — though she did not appear for the team. In the 2024–25 season, she achieved a domestic treble — the WSL title, FA Cup, and League Cup — as Chelsea finished the season unbeaten in domestic competitions.

==== Loan to Aberdeen, 2025–26 ====
In August 2025, it was announced that Cox would join Scottish Women's Premier League side Aberdeen on loan until the end of the 2025–26 season.

Cox made her club debut in a 5–1 loss to Hibernian on 17 August 2025. In February 2026, she was named to the SWPL Team of the Week. BBC Sport named Cox to their SWPL Team of the Week in May 2026. She made a total of 24 SWPL 1 appearances for Aberdeen across the length of her loan. On 10 June 2026, Aberdeen announced that Cox had returned to parent club Chelsea upon the expiration of her loan.

==== Return to Chelsea and new contract, 2026 ====
In August 2026, she was part of Chelsea's travelling squad for their pre-season tour and exhibition match in New Zealand and Australia. On 19 August 2026, Cox signed a new three-year contract with Chelsea.

==== Loan to Nottingham Forest, 2026– ====
Having signed a new contract with Chelsea on 19 August 2026, it was announced that Cox would spend the 2026–27 season on loan at Women's Super League 2 side Nottingham Forest, joining fellow Chelsea loanee Lois Shooter. On 8 November 2026, Cox sustained an early injury against Wolves and was replaced by Emily Batty in the ninth minute of play.

== International career ==
Cox has represented England in the under-16 and under-17 age groups.

Cox was captain of the Young Lionesses squad who reached the semi-final of the 2024 U-19 Euro, where they were defeated by eventual champions Spain.

In October 2024, Cox was named to England's under-23 squad for a series of Euro League fixtures. Alongside fellow Chelsea academy graduate Lexi Potter, Cox was again called up to the under-23 squad for a pair of fixtures against Germany and Portugal in October 2025. In April 2026, Cox was an unused substitute as the team beat Sweden to win the 2025–26 U23 European Competition.

In July 2026, Cox was called up to the England under-20 team for a series of fixtures ahead of the 2026 U-20 World Cup. On 21 August 2026, Cox was called up to represent England at the tournament.

On 17 November 2026, Cox received her first senior call-up for the 2027 FIFA Women's World Cup qualification play-off matches against Ukraine.

== Career statistics ==
=== Club ===
As of match played 8 November 2026

Appearances and goals by club, season and competition
Club	Season	League			Cup (Note: Includes Women's FA Cup and Women's Scottish Cup)		League Cup (Note: Includes WSL Players Cup (formerly known as the WSL/Women's League Cup) and the Scottish Women's Premier League Cup)		Europe		Total	
Club	Season	Division	Apps	Goals	Apps	Goals	Apps	Goals	Apps	Goals	Apps	Goals
Chelsea	2024–25	Women's Super League	0	0	0	0	0	0	0	0	0	0
Aberdeen (loan)	2025–26	Scottish Women's Premier League	24	0	0	0	0	0	0	0	24	0
Nottingham Forest (loan)	2026–27	Women's Super League 2	4	0	0	0	0	0	0	0	4	0
Career total			28	0	0	0	0	0	0	0	28	0

== Honours ==
=== Chelsea ===
==== Academy ====
- FA Youth Cup: 2021–22
- PGA Cup: 2022–23
- FA WSL Academy League Cup: 2023

==== Senior ====
- FA Women's Super League: 2024–25
- Women's FA Cup: 2024–25
- FA Women's League Cup: 2024–25

=== International ===
- U23 European Competition: 2025–26

=== Individual ===
- Chelsea Women's Academy Player of the Year: 2023–24
