= Jackie Bachteler =

American soccer player (born 1989)

Personal information
- Full name: Jacqueline Tina Bachteler
- Date of birth: May 18, 1989 (age 37)
- Place of birth: Massachusetts, United States
- Position: Midfielder

Team information
- Current team: Burnley (head coach)

College career
Years	Team	Apps	(Gls)
2007–2010	Florida Southern Moccasins		

Senior career*
Years	Team	Apps	(Gls)
2011	GBK Kokkola		
2012	IFK Gävle		
2013	Gustafs GoIF		
2013	Tyresö FF		
2014	Djurgården		

Managerial career
- 2016: Sunnanå SK
- 2016: Anorthosis Famagusta
- 2018–2019: Hammarby (assistant)
- 2020: Sollentuna FK
- 2023–2024: San Diego Wave (assistant)
- 2026–: Burnley
- * Club domestic league appearances and goals

Jacqueline Tina Bachteler (born May 18, 1989) is an American soccer coach and former player who is the head coach of Women's Super League 2 club Burnley. She played college soccer for the Florida Southern Moccasins before spending four years playing professionally for clubs across Finland and Sweden. She has previously head coached Swedish clubs Sunnanå SK and Sollentuna FK, and Cypriot club Anorthosis Famagusta.

== College career ==
Bachteler played college soccer at Florida Southern College for the Moccasins. In both 2009 and 2010, she was the team's most valuable player and earned recognition on the All-SSC second team. She also picked up all-region second team and SSC all-tournament team honors. She graduated from Florida Southern with a bachelor's degree in physiotherapy.

== Club career ==
In 2011, Bachteler joined Finish club GBK Kokkola to kick off her professional playing career. She made her Naisten Liiga debut in August of that year, starting in GBK's season-opening victory over Turun Weikot. She spent one season with the club.

Bachteler moved to Sweden in March 2012, signing for top-division team IFK Gävle. She then switched to fellow Swedish side Gustafs GoIF after the 2012 season concluded. In June 2013, she scored a goal in a 3–0 win over Roslagsbro IF. Midway through the 2013 campaign, she moved to Tyresö FF on a contract reportedly more lucrative than what Gustafs could offer. Bachteler concluded her playing career with a stint at Djurgården in 2014.

== Coaching career ==
As a teenager growing up playing soccer in Massachusetts, Bachteler also began dabbling in coaching at age 14. She rekindled the vocation in 2012, working as a coach for youth teams at IFK Gävle while also playing professionally for Gävle's senior team. Bachteler also gained three years of experience building the Tiki Taka Football training academy, collaborating with a staff group that included Tony Gustavsson.

On November 11, 2015, Bachteler was unveiled as head coach of Elitettan club Sunnanå SK. After leading the team through the first half of the season, she resigned from her post during the summer break due to feeling a lack of trust from the Sunnanå squad.

Bachteler was hired as head coach of Cypriot side Anorthosis Famagusta in September 2016. She had also received an offer to work at her former club, Djurgårdens IF, but declined the opportunity. Bachteler led Anorthosis to a second-place league finish in her lone season managing the team.

In 2017, Bachteler worked as a youth coach at IFK Stocksund. She then spent two years as an assistant coach at Hammarby. In the summer of 2018, she briefly worked with other Hammarby staff to lead the team after head coach Ann-Helen Grahm made a midseason departure.

Bachteler joined Sollentuna FK in 2020 as head coach. After being hired midseason, when Sollentuna FK were at risk for relegation, Bachteler led the team out of the bottom of the table and to a seventh-place Division 1 finish.

IF Brommapojkarna announced that they had hired Bachteler to their coaching staff on January 17, 2021, in a journey to strengthen the club's female division. Bachteler served the club in 2021 and 2022 as the sporting director of the girls academy; she oversaw coaching and development for players up to the age of 15.

Bachteler returned to the United States in 2023. She joined San Diego Wave FC's staff as first assistant coach ahead of the club's second season in the National Women's Soccer League. In her two seasons in San Diego, she contributed to the Wave's NWSL Shield win in 2023 and NWSL Challenge Cup win the following year. Bachteler then spent time as a player scout for the United States national team.

On December 10, 2025, Bachteler was announced to have joined the staff of English club Burnley. She was hired to improve both the club's men's academy and the women's professional team. Shortly after moving to England, she experienced a near-death bout of sepsis that prevented her from coaching for several months. In July 2026, after recovering from the worst of the condition, Bachteler was hired as the Burnley women's team's manager ahead of its first season in the Women's Super League 2.

== Personal life ==
Bachteler was born and raised in Massachusetts. She married Jennifer Rundberg in December 2023.
