= Ebba Hed =

Swedish footballer

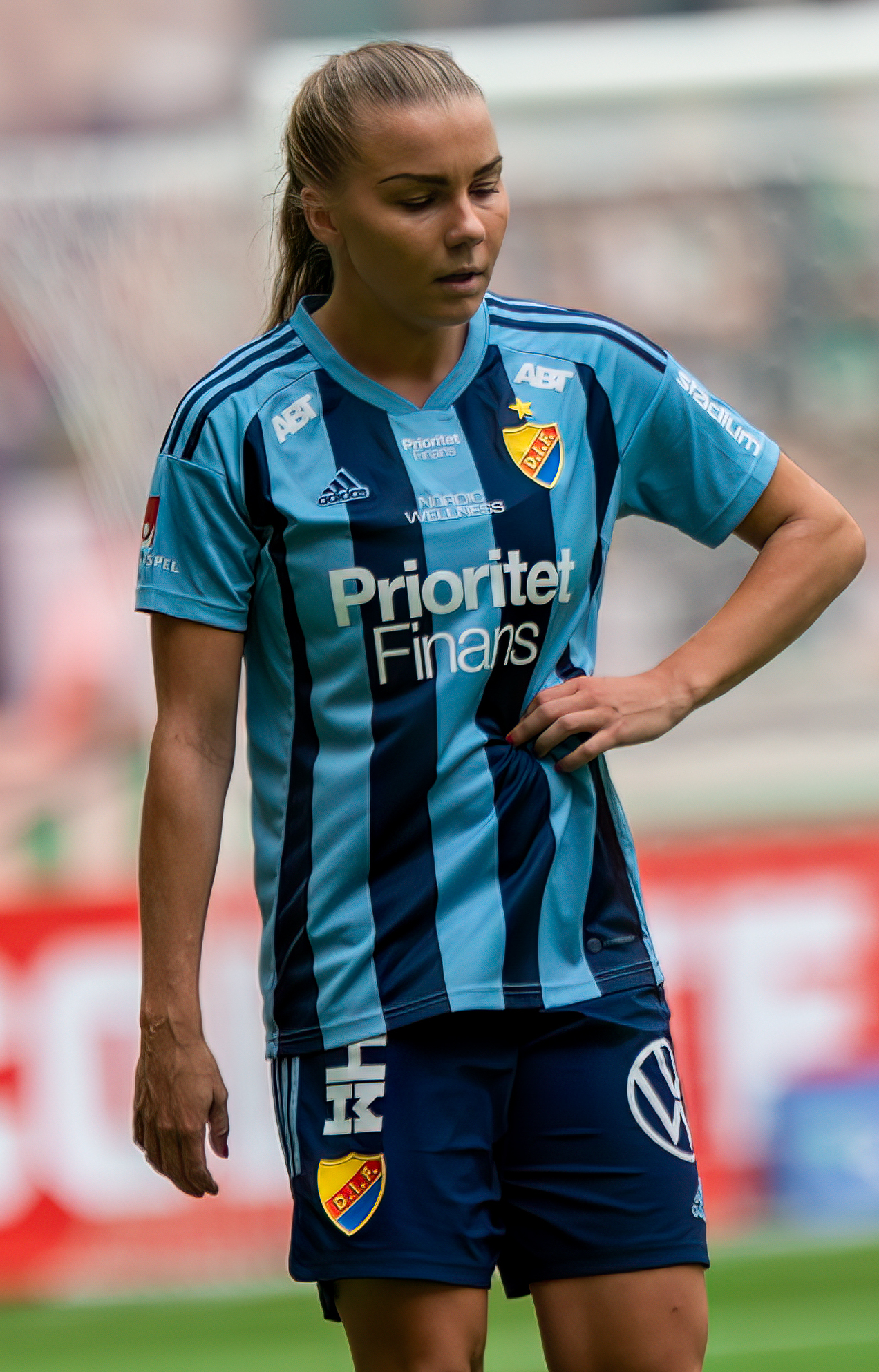
- Ebba Hed in 2022

Personal information
- Full name: Ebba Anna Vailet Hed
- Date of birth: 3 November 1999 (age 27)
- Place of birth: Halmstad, Sweden
- Height: 1.62 m (5 ft 4 in)
- Positions: Defender; midfielder

Team information
- Current team: Nottingham Forest
- Number: 12

Senior career*
Years	Team	Apps	(Gls)
2014–2016	IS Halmia	15	(2)
2016–2021	Vittsjö GIK	116	(8)
2022	Madrid CFF	4	(0)
2022–2025	Djurgårdens IF	77	(0)
2025–	Nottingham Forest	23	(0)

International career^{‡}
2014–2016	Sweden U17	10	(3)
2016–2018	Sweden U19		
- * Club domestic league appearances and goals as of 25 October 2026 ‡ National team caps and goals as of 20 October 2017

Ebba Anna Vailet Hed (born 3 November 1999) is a Swedish professional footballer who plays as a defender or midfielder for Women's Super League 2 (WSL2) club Nottingham Forest.

== Career ==
Hed joined Damallsvenskan side Djurgården from Liga F side Madrid CFF on a three-year contract in July 2022.

On 4 September 2025, Hed left the Damallsvenskan to join Nottingham Forest in the Women's Super League 2 (WSL2).
