= Tove Almqvist =

Swedish football midfielder (born 1996)

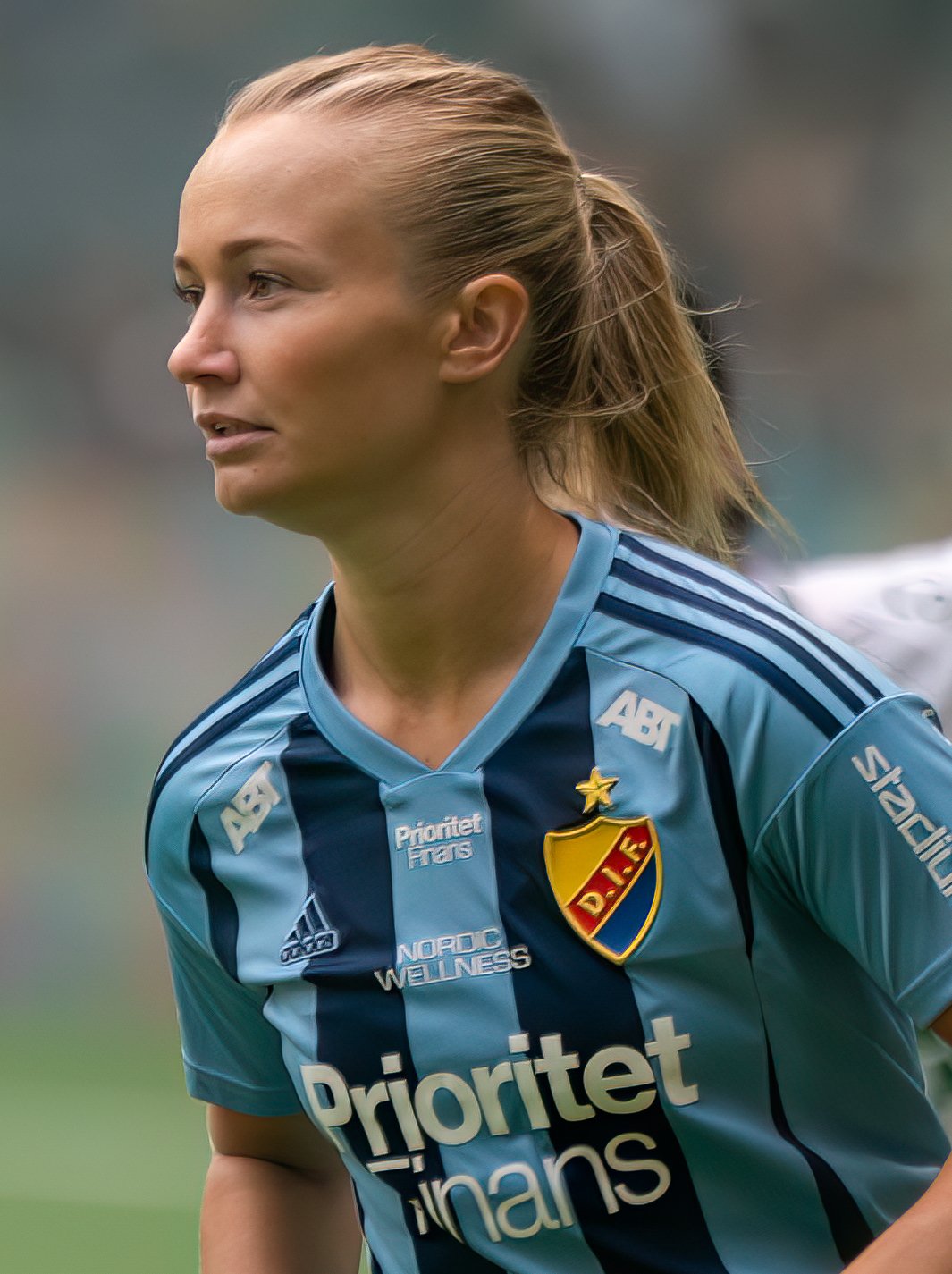
- Almqvist with Djurgårdens IF in 2022

Personal information
- Full name: Tove Ingrid Toini Almqvist
- Date of birth: 5 January 1996 (age 30)
- Place of birth: Sweden
- Height: 1.63 m (5 ft 4 in)
- Position: Midfielder

Team information
- Current team: Nottingham Forest
- Number: 11

Senior career*
Years	Team	Apps	(Gls)
2014–2018	Linköpings FC	70	(5)
2019–2021	Vittsjö GIK	22	(4)
2021–2025	Djurgårdens IF	74	(8)
2025–	Nottingham Forest	19	(0)

International career^{‡}
2014–2015	Sweden U19	9	(3)
2016	Sweden U20		
- * Club domestic league appearances and goals as of 25 October 2026 ‡ National team caps and goals as of 22 May 2016

Tove Ingrid Toini Almqvist (born 5 January 1996) is a Swedish footballer who plays as a midfielder for Nottingham Forest.

== Career ==
Almqvist played with Linköpings FC and won the Damallsvenskan on two occasions, in 2016 and 2017.

Almqvist then played with Vittsjö GIK and joined Djurgården for the 2022 season.

On 4 September 2025, Almqvist was announced at Nottingham Forest.

== Personal life ==
Tove Almqvist is the sister of Swedish footballer Pontus Almqvist.

== Honours ==
Linköpings FC

Winner

- Damallsvenskan (2): 2016, 2017
- Svenska Cupen (2): 2013–14, 2014–15

Runner-up

- Svenska Supercupen: 2015

Sweden U19

Winner

- UEFA Women's Under-19 Championship: 2015
