= Chantelle Boye-Hlorkah =

Ghanaian footballer (born 1995)

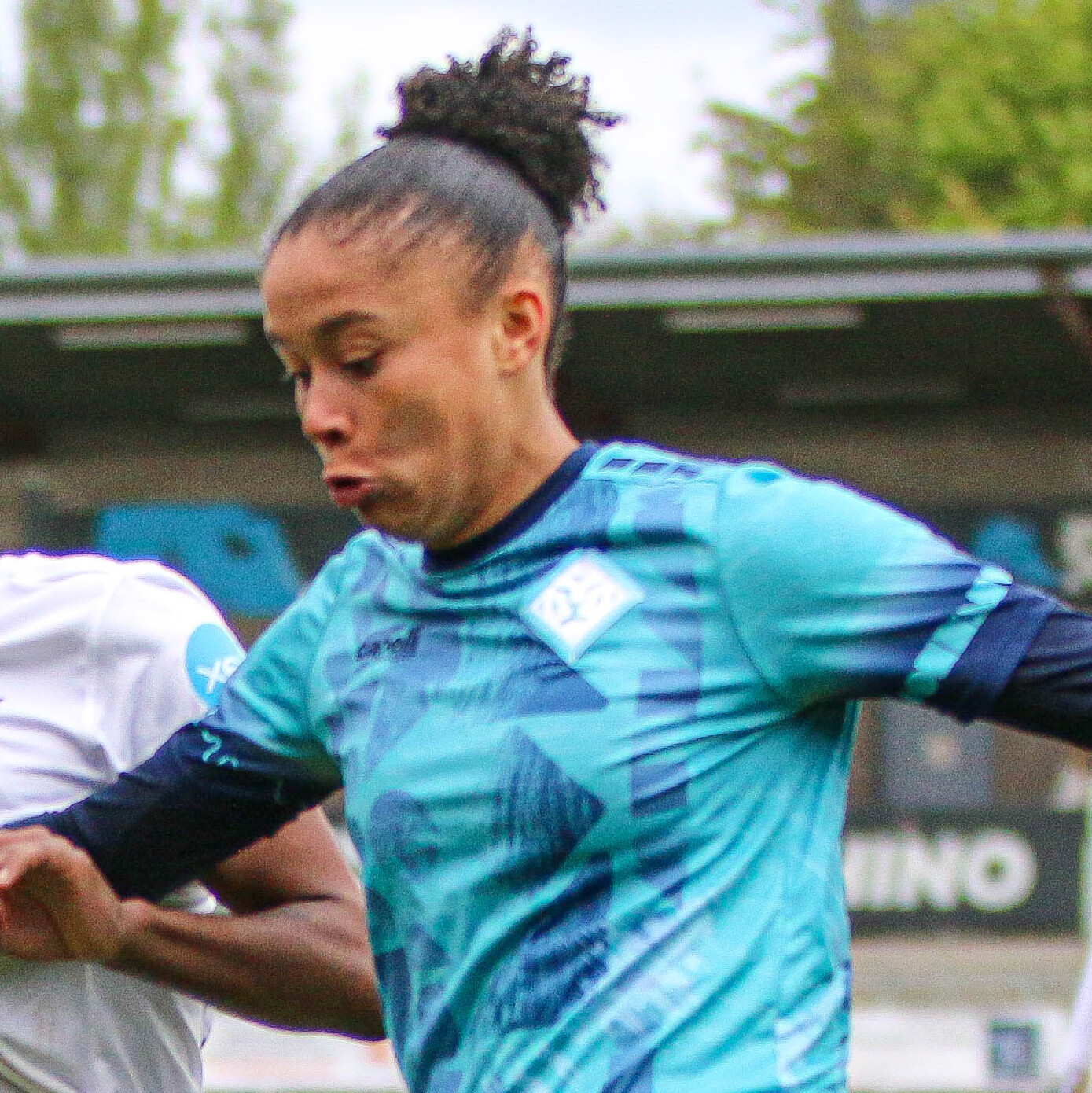
- Boye-Hlorkah in 2024

Personal information
- Full name: Chantelle Louise Boye-Hlorkah
- Date of birth: 8 September 1995 (age 31)
- Place of birth: England
- Height: 1.70 m (5 ft 7 in)
- Positions: Forward; full-back

Team information
- Current team: Nottingham Forest
- Number: 8

Youth career
- Everton

Senior career*
Years	Team	Apps	(Gls)
2013–2021	Everton	57	(7)
2021–2023	Aston Villa	22	(0)
2023–2025	London City Lionesses	37	(14)
2025–	Nottingham Forest	30	(11)

International career^{‡}
- England U19
- England U23
2025–	Ghana	1	(0)
- * Club domestic league appearances and goals as of 15 November 2026 ‡ National team caps and goals as of 24 April 2025

Chantelle Louise "Chaney" Boye-Hlorkah (/ˈʃæni ˌbɔɪəˈlɔːrkə/ SHAN-ee BOY-ə-LOR-kə; born 8 September 1995) is a footballer who plays as a winger for Women's Championship club Nottingham Forest. Born in England, she plays for the Ghana national team.

After playing for Everton for 8 years, Boye-Hlorkah joined Aston Villa and later London City Lionesses, where she was part of the team that was promoted to the WSL. She was part of the Ghana squad at the 2024 Women's Africa Cup of Nations.

== Club career ==
=== Everton ===
Boye-Hlorkah began her football training at the Everton Ladies Centre of Excellence.

She made her debut for the club in 2013. In May of the 2013 season she scored her first goal for the Blues against Doncaster Rovers Belles. After Everton won the 2017 Spring Series, she was offered her first full-time contract with the first team. On 12 June 2020, she signed a new one-year contract extension with the club.

=== Aston Villa ===
In 2021, Boye-Hlorkah signed a two year long contract with Aston Villa. She made 22 league appearances during her time with the club.

=== London City Lionesses ===
On 23 August 2023, it was announced that Boye-Hlorkah had joined London City Lionesses from Aston Villa on a one-year contract. On 13 July 2024, the club announced she had extended her contract for another year. On 15 May 2025, the club announced she would be leaving upon the expiry of her contract.

=== Nottingham Forest ===
On 12 August 2025, Boye-Hlorkah was announced at Nottingham Forest on a two-year contract.

== International career ==
Boye-Hlorkah was born in England to a Ghanaian father and English mother. She has represented England at the U-19 and U-23 levels. In April 2025, she received her first call-up to the Ghana senior national team for a double-header against Senegal. On 5 April 2025, she made her debut for the team, coming on as a substitute around the one-hour mark for Evelyn Badu.

On 30 June 2025, Boye-Hlorkah was called up to the Ghana squad for the 2024 Women's Africa Cup of Nations.

== International goals ==
No.	Date	Venue	Opponent	Score	Result	Competition
1.	30 May 2025	Felix Houphouet Boigny Stadium, Abidjan, Ivory Coast	Ivory Coast	2–0	3–3	Friendly
2.	25 June 2025	Ziaida Sports Complex, Benslimane, Morocco	Benin	4–2	4–2	Friendly
3.	14 July 2025	Berkane Municipal Stadium, Berkane, Morocco	Tanzania	4–1	4–1	2024 Women's Africa Cup of Nations
4.	28 February 2026	Al Hamriya Sports Club Stadium, Al Hamriyah, United Arab Emirates	Hong Kong	3–0	4–0	2026 Pink Ladies Cup
5.	9 August 2026	Al Medina Stadium, Rabat, Morocco	Malawi	1–0	1–2	2026 Women's Africa Cup of Nations

== Career statistics ==
As of 27 May 2023.

Club	Season	League			FA Cup		League Cup		Total	
Club	Season	Division	Apps	Goals	Apps	Goals	Apps	Goals	Apps	Goals
Everton	2013	FA WSL	10	2	0	0	1	0	11	2
Everton	2014	FA WSL	0	0	0	0	0	0	0	0
Everton	2015	FA WSL	0	0	0	0	2	0	2	0
Everton	2016–17	FA WSL	0	0	0	0	0	0	0	0
Everton	2017–18	FA WSL	10	1	0	0	4	0	14	1
Everton	2018–19	FA WSL	17	3	0	0	4	1	21	4
Everton	2019–20	FA WSL	10	0	0	0	3	1	13	1
Everton	2020–21	FA WSL	10	1	0	0	3	0	13	1
Everton	Total		57	7	0	0	17	2	74	9
Aston Villa	2021–22	Women's Super League	18	0	0	0	4	2	22	2
Aston Villa	2022–23	Women's Super League	4	0	0	0	2	0	6	0
Aston Villa	Total		22	0	0	0	6	2	28	2
London City Lionesses	2023–24	Championship	18	5	2	1	3	2	23	8
London City Lionesses	2024-25	Championship	5	2	0	0	1	0	6	2
London City Lionesses	Total		23	7	2	1	4	2	29	10
Career total			92	14	2	1	27	6	121	21

== Honours ==
Everton

- FA Women's Cup runners-up: 2013–14
- FA WSL 2: 2017

London City Lionesses

- Women's Super League 2: 2024–25
