= Nottingham Forest W.F.C. =

Association football club in England

Nottingham Forest Women
- Full name: Nottingham Forest Women Football Club
- Nicknames: Forest, The Garibaldis, The Reds, The Tricky Trees
- Short name: Forest
- Founded: 1990; 36 years ago
- Ground: City Ground
- Capacity: 30,455
- Coordinates: 52°56′24″N 1°7′58″W
- Owner: Evangelos Marinakis
- Chairman: Nicholas Randall KC
- Head coach: Tom Mallinson
- League: Women's Super League 2
- 2025–26: WSL 2, 7th of 12
- Website: www.nottinghamforest.co.uk/forest-women/
Home colours	Away colours	Third colours

Nottingham Forest Women is an English women's association football club affiliated with Nottingham Forest Football Club. Nottingham Forest Women are members of the Women's Super League 2, which stands at level two of the women's football league pyramid.

== History ==
The first known existence of a female Nottingham Forest team competed in the Notts and Derby League in the early 1970s.

=== Nottingham Forest Ladies ===
Nottingham Forest Women was officially founded in 1990 by the NFFC Community arm and then developed by the players. The small group of young women advertised in the men's official programme against Everton for players to join them.

Nottingham Forest Women picked up their first FA Women's Premier League title in the 2007–08 season, winning the Northern Division following a 5–1 victory in their last game of the season against Sheffield Wednesday.

Nottingham Forest Women submitted an unsuccessful application to join the Women's Super League for the inaugural 2011 FA WSL season. As a result, the club missed out on £70,000 of Football Association funding to develop the club's footballing infrastructure and the television coverage of the league's deal with ESPN.

Nottingham Forest Ladies recorded their highest placing in the FA Women's Premier League (then the top division of English women's football) in the 2010–11 FA Women's Premier League season by finishing 2nd behind Sunderland. In the same season, Forest also reached the 2010–11 FA Women's Premier League Cup final where they were defeated by Barnet on penalties.

Nottingham Forest Ladies submitted another unsuccessful application to join the Women's Super League in 2012 as part of the league's restructuring into two tiers with eight teams in the Women's Super League 1 and 10 teams in the newly created Women's Super League 2. The club missed out again on Football Association funding of either £70,000 (awarded to clubs in Women's Super League 1) or £25,000 (awarded to clubs in Women's Super League 2) which led to concerns that the club may fold with a financial shortfall of £20,000.

The club's financial concerns continued ahead of the FA Women's Premier League 2013–14 season during which the club announced that following five years of funding (including a £10,000 donation from former owner Fawaz Al-Hasawi in August 2012), Nottingham Forest would no longer financially support Nottingham Forest Ladies Football Club for the 2013–14 season and beyond, or provide them with any club playing kit that had been ordered in November 2012. The club's short-term future was secured by electronic cigarette company E-Lites who agreed a short-term sponsorship deal to enable Nottingham Forest Ladies to complete the season in which they eventually finished 4th in the Northern Division.

Nottingham Forest Ladies continued as a self-funded football club until the 2017–18 FA Women's Premier League season. The team, however, were unable to better that 4th-place finish with a highest place finish of 6th in the 2015–16 FA Women's Premier League season and the semi finals of the FA Women's Premier League Cup in the 2015–16 competition (in which they were defeated 1–0 by eventual winners Tottenham Hotspur). The club were sustained financially throughout this period by sponsorship partnerships with the No More Page 3 campaign, Ryley Wealth Management, and Inc. London.

In April 2016, Nottingham Forest Ladies were awarded a tier three license to launch a Regional Talent Centre in which to deliver enhanced coaching and support to improve the development of elite female players through the Football Association's girls' England talent pathway. The Regional Talent Centre age groups covered under 12s, 14s and 16s, in which the under 12s competed in Charter Standard youth leagues (designed to enable players to further develop both technically and physically) and the older age groups competed in Football Association organised fixture programmes against other Regional Talent Centres.

=== Nottingham Forest Women ===
Under Nottingham Forest owner Evangelos Marinakis, Nottingham Forest Ladies have been integrated into the whole football club.

In April 2018, Nottingham Forest and Nottingham Forest Ladies announced an agreement to create a close working relationship between the two organisations and work towards becoming one football club. The agreement involved a financial commitment to Nottingham Forest Ladies for on and off the pitch development, players being integrated into club initiatives and marketing campaigns, and a club website presence with player profiles, fixtures, and results.

In May 2019, Forest announced that Nottingham Forest Ladies would cease to operate as an independent club and operate fully under Nottingham Forest's control at the City Ground. Forest appointed Lee Billiard as General Manager and former Durham Women and Oxford United Manager Andy Cook as the team's first full-time Head Coach.

Following this change, Forest announced in June 2019 that Nottingham Forest Ladies were being renamed to Nottingham Forest Women. As part of the change, Nottingham Forest Women adopted the Nottingham Forest badge and removed the word 'Ladies' from the logo.

Nottingham Forest Women entered into a partnership with Nottingham Trent University in August 2019 in which Nottingham Trent University helped construct a women's football programme across the two organisations (in which female footballers could apply to study at Nottingham Trent University and represent Nottingham Forest Women at the first-team level) and introduced a sports scholarship to players who wish to feature in the women's first-team squad. The partnership also enabled Nottingham Forest Women to Nottingham Trent University's health and well-being resources including strength and conditioning facilities, pitch-side physiotherapy and sports science support.

The partnership between Nottingham Forest Women and Nottingham Trent University has since provided a pathway for players to progress to the first-team including Aja Aguirre, Katie Middleton, Mai Moncaster, Niamh Reynolds, Charlotte Steggles, and Sophie Tudor.

The FA Women's National League 2019–20 and 2020–21 seasons were abandoned as a result of the COVID-19 pandemic. Promotion and relegation were not implemented in 2019–2020 and Watford were awarded promotion from the 2020–21 season to the Women's Championship as a result of the FA Women's Football Board's upward movement application process.

Following the resumption of FA Women's National League competition for the 2021–22 season, the club achieved its highest league position since the 2015–16 season by finishing 5th. The club also won the FA Women's National League Plate for the first time by beating AFC Wimbledon 2–1 in the 2021–22 final.

Forest's success continued into the FA Women's National League 2022–23 season when the club completed a league and cup double by finishing 1st in the FA Women's National League Northern Premier Division (their first league title since winning the FA Women's Premier League in 2007–08) and winning the FA Women's National League Cup for the first time by beating Watford 3–2 in 2022–23 final. Forest were, however, denied promotion to Women's Championship after they were defeated 1–0 by Southern Premier Division champions Watford in the promotion play-off final.

==== Professional hybrid era ====
In July 2023, Nottingham Forest confirmed that beginning in the FA Women's National League 2023–24 season, the Nottingham Forest Women's team will be fully integrated within the club's football department and operate a professional hybrid model as part of Forest's plans to create a fully-professional women's first team. Under the professional hybrid model, Forest's female players are under contract for the first time in the club's history and relocated their training facilities to the Nigel Doughty Academy, where the players will receive an increased amount of training sessions.

The change to a professional hybrid model coincided with numerous changes in the Nottingham Forest Women's footballing operations. Head Coach Andy Cook left the club to join Newcastle United after leading Forest to a league and cup double in the 2022–23 FA Women's National League season and the club's reserve team was disbanded. The transition also saw numerous players leaving the football club including first-team players Georgia Hewitt, Gianna Mitchell, Yasmin Mosby, Naomi Powell, Charlotte Steggles, Rosetta Taylor, and Amy West. The club, however, were able to retain the services of 2022–2023 leading goal scorer Charlotte Greengrass, club captain Lyndsey Harkin, Aja Aguirre, Becky Anderson, Emily Batty, Olivia Cook, Sophie Domingo, Hayley James, Mai Moncaster, Laura-Jayne O'Neill, and Niamh Reynolds.

Former Aston Villa and Watford General Manager and London City Lionesses Director of Football Amber Wildgust was appointed as the club's Head of Women and Girls Football with the responsibility of leading the progression of Nottingham Forest Women on and off the pitch. The club also appointed former Aston Villa first-team coach and West Bromwich Albion assistant manager Carly Davies as Head Coach.

==== 2023–24 season ====
Forest added to their first-team squad ahead of the start of their FA Women's National League Northern Premier League title defence season by completing the signings of full-back Nat Johnson and midfielders Mollie Green, Holly Manders, and Freya Thomas.

Forest started the season strongly with successive league victories over Stourbridge (home, 7–0), West Bromwich Albion (away, 1–4), and AFC Fylde (home, 3–1) and a 5–0 away win against Solihull Moors to progress to the FA Women's National League Cup first round and defend their 2022–23 crown. The promising start to the season was enhanced with the arrivals of defender Abi Cowie and forward Louanne Worsey on season-long deals from the Women's Championship team Birmingham City.

September and October proved to be challenging for Carly Davies' side, however, with an FA Women's National League Cup second-round home 2–1 win over Wolverhampton Wanderers and home 5–0 league win over Liverpool Feds sitting between league defeats over promotion rivals Burnley (away, 4–2), local rivals Derby County at (home, 1–2), and a Women's National League Cup third-round away 3–0 defeat against eventual beaten finalists Newcastle United. Forest responded by winning 10 of their next 11 matches including four Women's FA Cup wins against Sheffield FC (home, 7–0), Sporting Khalsa (home, 3–2), Boldmere St Michaels (home, 3–1) and Plymouth Argyle (away, 1–6) to set up a fifth-round proper tie against Women's Super League outfit Everton. This run (of which the only loss was a 0–1 home defeat against league leaders Newcastle United) left the side in 2nd place (four points behind Newcastle) and saw Northern Ireland U19 international full-back Ella Haughey and midfielder Alice Keitley join the club from Lisburn Rangers and a dual-registration loan from Women's Super League team Aston Villa respectively.

Carly Davies' side was unable to take their momentum from eight consecutive wins into the Women's FA Cup fifth-round tie against Everton with the Women's Super League side running out comfortable 1–7 winners at Grange Park with Forest generating £123,000 in revenue from their furthest run in the competition since the 2012–13 season. Forest was unable to rebuild the momentum they created between November 2023 and February 2024 for their final nine FA Women's National League Northern Premier League fixtures and took only 17 points from a possible 27 and finished their title defence in 3rd place on 47 points (1 point behind 2nd placed Burnley and 12 points behind champions Newcastle United), missing out on promotion to the Women's Championship for another season.

==== Professional era ====
On 9 July 2024, Nottingham Forest confirmed that from the 2025–26 season the club would become a full-time professional outfit. From the 2024–25 season, Forest Women's first team will play all eleven of their home games at The City Ground and consist of 18 full-time professional players and a small number of part-time players before the transition. Moving to a full time professional model, the women would see an overall contact with the squad, which would allow for an enhanced learning and training education in addition to being able to access the elite nutritional, medical, support and recovery services the club offers.

At Academy level, all paid subscriptions to the Girls' Academy will be scrapped resulting in parity with the Boys' Academy. With the Women's first team and Girl's academy together, the move will help meet FIFA's “recommendations for optimal talent development”.

Finally as part of its ‘Vision for Sport’ initiative, the club will launch a major expansion program for grassroots girls football venues within the city itself. There will be a focus on under-served inner-city locations within Nottingham where girls opportunities have been vastly scarce. The aim is to improve accessibility, diversify the homegrown talent pool and provide greater access to health and fitness. The club stated :

”The aim of the initiative is to allow every girl with ambitions of a career playing for Nottingham Forest to have the same opportunities as boys have enjoyed for many years”.

On 27 April 2025, Nottingham Forest achieved the 2024–25 FA Women's National League title and promotion to the Championship, following a 7–2 victory over West Bromwich Albion.

== Stadia ==
=== Current stadium ===
From the 2024–25 season, the club will play all eleven home fixtures at The City Ground. They have played several competitive fixtures at since 2021 in various competitions before then. The first game was hosting Derby County. Nottingham Forest lost the game 2–0 in front of an FA Women's National League Northern Premier Division record attendance of 4,443.

List of Nottingham Forest women's matches at the City Ground prior to the 2024-2025 season
Date	Opposition	Competition	Result	Attendance	Ref.
3 October 2021	Derby County	WNL Northern Premier Division	0 - 2	4,443	
29 January 2022	Manchester City	FA Cup	0 - 8	3,994	
16 October 2022	Derby County	WNL Northern Premier Division	3 - 1	5,082	
8 October 2023	Derby County	WNL Northern Premier Division	1 - 2	6,037	
19 November 2023	Newcastle United	WNL Northern Premier Division	0 - 1	4,995	

=== Previous stadia ===
Up until the 2024–25 season Nottingham Forest Women played their home games at Long Eaton United's Grange Park. Grange Park has a capacity of 1,500 (with 500 under standing cover and 150 seats).

Before then, the team played their home matches at Eastwood C.F.C.'s Coronation Park between February 2019 and July 2023. Prior to playing at Eastwood, they played at Carlton Town F.C.'s Bill Stokeld Stadium and Basford United F.C.'s Greenwich Avenue.

== Managers ==
This section currently includes managers appointed since Nottingham Forest Ladies were integrated into Nottingham Forest and were renamed to Nottingham Forest Women.

Information correct as of match played 13 September 2026. Only competitive matches are counted.

Number	Manager	From	To	Played	W	L	D	W %	L %	D %
1	Andy Cook	July 2019	July 2023	93	62	11	20	67%	12%	21%
2	Carly Davies	August 2023	June 2026	89	59	10	20	66%	11%	23%
3	Tom Mallinson	June 2026	Present	2	0	0	2	0%	0%	100%

== Players ==
=== First Team ===
As of 9 September 2026

Note: Flags indicate national team as defined under FIFA eligibility rules; some limited exceptions apply. Players may hold more than one non-FIFA nationality.

No.	Pos.	Nation	Player
1	GK	ENG	Emily Batty
2	DF	ENG	Cerys Brown
3	DF	ENG	Abbie Lafayette
4	DF	ENG	Georgia Brougham (captain)
5	DF	IRL	Chloe Mustaki
6	FW	CAN	Deanne Rose
7	FW	JAM	Shania Hayles
8	FW	GHA	Chantelle Boye-Hlorkah
9	FW	JAM	Melissa Johnson
10	FW	ENG	Aimee Claypole
11	MF	SWE	Tove Almqvist
12	DF	SWE	Ebba Hed

No.	Pos.	Nation	Player
13	MF	WAL	Rachel Rowe
14	MF	AUS	Leticia McKenna
15	DF	ENG	Hannah Coan
16	DF	ENG	Codie Thomas (on loan from Manchester City)
17	MF	ENG	Freya Thomas
18	FW	FIN	Ilona Walta
20	FW	NOR	Tuva Espås
21	FW	ENG	Lois Shooter (on loan from Chelsea)
22	DF	ENG	Grace McEwen (on loan from Brighton & Hove Albion)
24	GK	ENG	Katie Cox (on loan from Chelsea)
29	GK	ENG	Georgie Ferguson
31	MF	AUS	Alana Murphy

== Club Staff ==
=== Coaching staff ===
As of 5 June 2026

Role	Name
Head of Women & Girls' Football	Amber Wildgust
Head Coach	Tom Mallinson
Assistant Coach	Riteesh Mishra; Kate Longhurst
Goalkeeping Coach	Jake Wood
Physical Performance Coach	James Cottrell
Performance Analyst	James Flower
Physiotherapist	Terri Denham
Sports Therapist	Ellie Lewis
Doctor	Megan Burton
Performance Analyst Assistant	Joe Jermy
Sports Science Assistant	Mia Filipiak

== Honours ==
=== Club honours ===
As of 15 July 2025

==== Nottingham Forest Ladies ====
Competition	Nº of Titles	Seasons
Unison East Midlands League Cup	2	1999–2000, 2001–2002
Unison East Midlands League	1	2002–2003
Nottinghamshire FA Women's County Cup	13	2003–2004, 2005–2006, 2006–2007, 2008–2009, 2009–2010, 2010–2011, 2011–2012, 2012–2013, 2013–2014, 2015–2016, 2016–2017, 2017–2018, 2018–2019
Midland Combination League	1	2004–2005
FA Women's Premier League Northern Division	1	2007–2008

==== Nottingham Forest Women ====
Competition	Nº of Titles	Seasons
Nottinghamshire FA Women's County Cup	1	2021–2022
FA Women's National League Plate	1	2021–2022
FA Women's National League Northern Premier Division	2	2022–2023, 2024–2025
FA Women's National League Cup	2	2022–2023, 2024–2025

=== Individual honours ===
This section currently includes honours awarded since Nottingham Forest Ladies were integrated into Nottingham Forest and were renamed to Nottingham Forest Women.

==== Season-End Awards ====
Year	Players' Player	Manager's Player	Young Player	Fans' Player	Fan's Goal of the Season	Leading Goalscorer
2019–2020	Lyndsey Harkin	Georgia Hewitt	Bex Rayner; Olivia Cook			Precious Hamilton (24)
2020–2021	Lyndsey Harkin	Aja Aguirre	Katie Middleton			Rosie Axten (6)
2021–2022	Lyndsey Harkin; Emily Batty	Lyndsey Harkin		Mai Moncaster		Rachel Brown (11)
2022–2023	Emily Batty	Charlotte Greengrass				Charlotte Greengrass (22)
2023–2024	Freya Thomas	Freya Thomas		Freya Thomas	Nat Johnson (vs. AFC Fylde)	Holly Manders (16)
2024–2025	Charlie Wellings	Mollie Green		Charlie Wellings		Melissa Johnson (27); Charlie Wellings (27)

Social media reliability note:
Some of the information in the "Individual honours" table is from Nottingham Forest Women's social media profiles. Social media profiles are often controlled by the organization or individual that they represent, and they may not be subject to the same standards of editorial oversight as traditional media sources. The information has been verified by checking the football club's website and other reliable sources.
