= Southampton F.C. Women =

- Full name: Southampton Football Club Women
- Nickname: The Saints
- Founded: 2017; 9 years ago
- Ground: St Mary's Stadium; Silverlake Stadium (select competition games)
- Capacity: 32,384; 5,192 (2,700 seated)
- Coordinates: 50°54′21″N 1°23′28″W; St Mary's Stadium
- Owner: Sport Republic
- Chairman: Henrik Kraft
- Head coach: Simon Parker
- League: Women's Super League 2
- 2025–26: WSL 2, 5th of 12
- Website: southamptonfc.com/women
Home colours	Away colours	Third colours

Southampton Football Club Women is an English women's football club affiliated with Southampton FC. Based in Southampton, the club plays in the Women's Super League 2 in the 2024–25 season after winning promotion from the FA Women's National League South in 2022.

== History ==
=== Other clubs ===
In 1970, Southampton Women's F.C. was formed by female fans of the men's Southampton, but the two clubs were unaffiliated. Southampton Women's F.C. went on to great success in England, winning the WFA Cup (now Women's FA Cup) eight times.

Another team, Southampton Saints Girls & Ladies F.C. were formed in 1979 as Red Star FC, who were founder members of the WFA Women's National League in 1991. The club adopted the name Southampton Saints Girls & Ladies on affiliating to Southampton F.C. in 1995, and was absorbed by Southampton F.C. in 2001. The club had financial difficulties in 2005; the men's senior side were relegated from the Premier League after 27 years of top-flight football, and Southampton men's side withdrew support for the female side. Southampton Saints Girls & Ladies continued without major club support for another 14 years, before announcing their demise due to financial difficulties in July 2019.

=== Revival ===
By 2016 Southampton FC, under new ownership, saw the need for a competitive senior women's team as the profile of women's football in the UK grew. With the club's Regional Talent Centre, a Southampton Under-16 team was formed, and an Under-21 side in May 2017. The club formed an adult women's side for the 2017–18 season and were admitted to the Hampshire Women's League Division 1. In March 2018, Southampton unsuccessfully applied to enter the FA Women's Championship (Tier 2).

In June 2018, after winning the Hampshire Women's League Division 1, the senior team was listed for the following season's Southern Region Women's Football League First Division South. In July 2018, the club appointed former England international Marieanne Spacey-Cale as head of Women's and Girls' Football. Spacey-Cale has 91 senior England caps.

In the 2018–19 season, the club played in the Southern Region Premier Division, and won the title with a perfect record of 18 wins, earning promotion to the FA Women's National League Division One. They also beat Oxford City Women in the League Cup, achieving a domestic Double.

In both the 2019–20 and 2020–21 seasons, the club were top of the FA Women's National League Division 1 South West at the point when the season was curtailed due to the coronavirus outbreak.

The club applied for, and were granted, upward club movement in the summer of 2021, being placed in the FA Women's National League Southern Premier Division for the 2021–22 season.

In the 2021–22 season, the club won the FA Women's National League Southern Premier Division to earn a chance to get promoted to the second-tier by beating the FA WNL Northern Premier Division champions in a play-off. On 21 May 2022, Southampton earned a first ever promotion to the FA Women's Championship (WSL2) by defeating Wolverhampton Wanderers 1–0 in the play-off.

=== Women's Championship (WS2) ===
Following promotion to the FA Women's Championship (WSL2), the club announced they would turn professional and play all of their home games at St Mary's. After a 1–0 home defeat to Sheffield United in the final game of the season, the club finished in sixth place in the league.

At the end of the 2023–24 season Marieanne Spacey-Cale stepped down from the manager's position and moved into the position of head of women's football within the club. On 12 July 2024, Remi Allen was appointed as head coach. Allen left the club by mutual agreement on 28 February 2025, and Spacey-Cale moved back into the role until the end of the season.

On 4 July 2025, Simon Parker was appointed as head coach. On 10 January 2026, the club broke its attendance record when a total of 7,561 spectators attended their 4–0 derby win over Portsmouth FC., At the end of the season they finished 5th in the League.

== Squad ==
As of 28 October 2026

Note: Flags indicate national team as defined under FIFA eligibility rules; some limited exceptions apply. Players may hold more than one non-FIFA nationality.

No.	Pos.	Nation	Player
1	GK	IRL	Grace Moloney
2	DF	SCO	Rachel Brown
3	DF	ENG	Milly Mott
4	MF	ENG	Mary Bashford
5	DF	ENG	Amy Goddard
6	DF	ENG	Ellie Hack
7	FW	ENG	Ellie Brazil
8	MF	SCO	Chloe Peplow
9	FW	ENG	Emma Harries
10	MF	SCO	Michaela McAlonie
11	MF	SCO	Abbie Ferguson

No.	Pos.	Nation	Player
12	FW	ENG	Maria Edwards
13	GK	NZL	Alina Santos
14	MF	WAL	Laura Hughes
15	DF	ENG	Niamh Murphy
17	MF	ENG	Libbi McInnes
18	FW	ENG	Freya Jupp
23	DF	ENG	Megan Collett
26	FW	ENG	Ruby-Rae Tucker
27	MF	ENG	Saffia Rae
28	FW	ENG	Jessie Archibald
29	DF	ENG	Jasmine Lampard

=== Out on loan ===
Note: Flags indicate national team as defined under FIFA eligibility rules; some limited exceptions apply. Players may hold more than one non-FIFA nationality.

No.	Pos.	Nation	Player

== Coaching staff ==
Position	Staff
Head of women's football	Marieanne Spacey-Cale
First team head coach	Simon Parker
First team assistant coach	David Seymour
First team goalkeeping coach	Will Britt

== Managerial history ==
As of 20 April, 2026:

Name	Tenure	Refs
(England) Marieanne Spacey	July 2018 – 30 April 2024	
(England) Remi Allen	12 July 2024 – 28 February 2025	
(England) Marieanne Spacey (interim)	28 February 2025 – 4 May 2025	
(England) Simon Parker	4 July 2025 –	

== Youth Development ==
Southampton F.C. are well known for their youth development and scouting programmes. The club run a female-specific development programme, spanning talent clubs, summer camps, and the FA-approved Premier League Girls' Football Programme. In May 2017 the club announced the formation of a dedicated U-21 women's squad to complement their coaching programme and provide a feeder route into the women's first team.

== Honours ==
League

- FA Women's National League South Southern Premier Division (Level 3)
  - Champions (2021-22)
  - Play-Off Winners: (2022)
- Southern Region Women's Football League Premier Division (Level 5)
  - Champions (2018–19)
- Hampshire Women's Football League Division 1 (Level 7)
  - Champions (2018–19)

Cup

- FA Women's National League Cup
  - Champions (2021–22)
- Southern Region Women's Football League Cup
  - Champions (2018–19)
- Hampshire FA Women's Challenge Cup
  - Runners up (2021, 2022*)

^{*Withdrawal from Final due to Fixture Congestion}

Under 21 Honours

- Hampshire FA Women's Challenge Cup
  - Winners (2025, 2026)
  - Runners up (2023, 2024)
