= 2023–24 Bristol City W.F.C. season =

Bristol City
2023–24 season
- Head coach: Lauren Smith
- Stadium: Aston Gate, Bristol
- WSL: 12th (relegated)
- FA Cup: Fourth round
- League Cup: Group stage
- Top goalscorer: League: Amalie Thestrup (9); All: Amalie Thestrup (9)
- Highest home attendance: 14,138 (vs. Manchester United, 26 November)
- Lowest home attendance: 4,112 (vs. Everton, 18 May)
- Average home league attendance: 6,974
Home colours	Away colours	Third colours

The 2023–24 Bristol City W.F.C. season was the club's eighth season under the Bristol City affiliation and the organisation's 25th overall season in existence. It was their first season back in the Women's Super League, the highest level of the football pyramid, following promotion as Championship winners, ending a two-year absence. Along with competing in the WSL, the club also contested two domestic cup competitions: the FA Cup and the League Cup.

Ahead of the season, the club confirmed the women's team's primary home ground would be the club's main stadium, Aston Gate, moving from the Robins High Performance Centre in Failand after one season. Megan Connolly was announced as the new captain on 19 September.

On 28 April 2024, Bristol City were relegated to the Championship after a 4–0 home defeat to Manchester City left the team eight points adrift from safety with two games left to play.

== Squad ==
As of 25 January 2024

Note: Flags indicate national team as defined under FIFA eligibility rules; some limited exceptions apply. Players may hold more than one non-FIFA nationality.

No.	Pos.	Nation	Player
1	GK	ENG	Fran Bentley
2	DF	WAL	Ella Powell
3	DF	DEN	Sille Struck
4	DF	ENG	Naomi Layzell
5	DF	ENG	Brooke Aspin (on loan from Chelsea)
6	MF	IRL	Megan Connolly (captain)
7	FW	SCO	Abi Harrison
8	MF	ENG	Amy Rodgers
9	FW	JAM	Shania Hayles
10	MF	NIR	Rachel Furness
11	DF	SCO	Jamie-Lee Napier
12	DF	IRL	Chloe Mustaki
13	GK	WAL	Olivia Clark
15	MF	ENG	Jasmine Bull

No.	Pos.	Nation	Player
16	MF	ENG	Emily Syme
17	FW	DEN	Amalie Thestrup
18	MF	CAN	Sarah Stratigakis
22	MF	SCO	Lisa Evans
23	FW	WAL	Carrie Jones
24	FW	WAL	Ffion Morgan
25	GK	ENG	Erin Foley
29	DF	ENG	Mari Ward
30	GK	USA	Shae Yáñez
36	MF	ENG	Fearne Slocombe
38	MF	WAL	Manon Pearce
39	FW	ENG	Maya Kendall
44	DF	JAM	Satara Murray

== Preseason ==
2 September 2023 Friendly	Manchester City	3–2	Bristol City	Manchester
	Castellanos; Aspin (o.g.); Shaw	Report	Harrison (pen.); Furness	Stadium: Academy Stadium; Attendance: Behind-closed-doors

10 September 2023 Friendly	West Ham United	3–0	Bristol City	Dagenham
	Asseyi 58', 63', 90'			Stadium: Victoria Road

== Women's Super League ==
=== Results summary ===
Overall								Home						Away					
Pld	W	D	L	GF	GA	GD	Pts	W	D	L	GF	GA	GD	W	D	L	GF	GA	GD
22	1	3	18	20	70	−50	6	0	0	11	7	32	−25	1	3	7	13	38	−25

Last updated: 18 May 2024.
Source: WSL

=== Results by matchday ===
Round	1	2	3	4	5	6	7	8	9	10	11	12	13	14	15	16	17	18	19	20	21	22
Ground	H	A	A	H	A	H	A	H	A	H	A	H	A	A	H	A	H	A	H	H	A	H
Result	L	L	L	L	W	L	D	L	D	L	L	L	D	L	L	L	L	L	L	L	L	L
Position	11	12	12	12	11	12	12	12	11	12	12	12	12	12	12	12	12	12	12	12	12	12

A = Away; H = Home; W = Win; D = Draw; L = Loss

=== Results ===
1 October 2023 1	Bristol City	2–4	Leicester City	Bristol
14:00	Jones 33'; Thestrup 85' (pen.)	Report	Palmer 45+2'; O'Brien 49'; Petermann 52'; Cain (yellow card) 78'; Rantala 83'; Green (yellow card) 90'	Stadium: Ashton Gate; Attendance: 4,132; Referee: Elizabeth Simms

8 October 2023 2	Tottenham Hotspur	3–1	Bristol City	Leyton
14:00	Neville (yellow card) 23'; Ahtinen 31'; Thomas 35'; Summanen 45+4'	Report	Napier (yellow card) 12'; Aspin (yellow card) 59'; Thestrup 64' (pen.)	Stadium: Brisbane Road; Attendance: 1,605; Referee: Lauren Impey

15 October 2023 3	Manchester City	5–0	Bristol City	Manchester
13:00	Roord 9', 45+2'; Aleixandri 33'; Shaw 38', 45+6'	Report	Rodgers (yellow card) 48'	Stadium: Academy Stadium; Attendance: 3,789; Referee: Stacey Fullicks

22 October 2023 4	Bristol City	1–2	Arsenal	Bristol
18:45	Furness 16', (yellow card) 84'; Murray (yellow card) 90+3'	Report	McCabe 7', 59'; Wubben-Moy (yellow card) 31'; Russo (yellow card) 78'	Stadium: Ashton Gate; Attendance: 12,008; Referee: Adewunmi Soneye

5 November 2023 5	West Ham United	2–3	Bristol City	Dagenham
15:00	Asseyi 27' (pen.); Ueki 45+3'	Report	Napier (yellow card) 5'; Furness (yellow card) 17'; Thestrup 32'; Powell 37'; Aspin 55'; Harrison (yellow card) 80'; Connolly (yellow card) 90+2'	Stadium: Victoria Road; Attendance: 791; Referee: Kirsty Dowle

12 November 2023 6	Bristol City	0–2	Aston Villa	Bristol
14:00	Jones (yellow card) 38'	Report	Leon (yellow card) 35'; Connolly 77' (o.g.); Salmon 86'	Stadium: Ashton Gate; Attendance: 4,407; Referee: Melissa Burgin

19 November 2023 7	Everton	2–2	Bristol City	Liverpool
13:00	Piemonte 5', (yellow card) 69'; Finnigan 57'	Report	Rodgers 45+1'; Thestrup 82'	Stadium: Walton Hall Park; Attendance: 886; Referee: Adewunmi Soneye

26 November 2023 8	Bristol City	0–2	Manchester United	Bristol
12:30	Aspin (yellow card) 4'; Connolly (yellow card) 64'	Report	Miyazawa 50'; Parris 55'	Stadium: Ashton Gate; Attendance: 14,138; Referee: Stacey Fullicks

10 December 2023 9	Liverpool	1–1	Bristol City	Birkenhead
14:00	Hinds (yellow card) 22'; Bonner (yellow card) 46'; Fisk (yellow card) 55'; Haug 57'	Report	Harrison (yellow card) 12'; Thestrup (yellow card) 43', (goal) 50'	Stadium: Prenton Park; Attendance: 1,341; Referee: Stacey Fullicks

17 December 2023 10	Bristol City	0–3	Chelsea	Bristol
14:00		Report	James 17'; Charles (yellow card) 24' (yellow-red card) 90+6'; Cuthbert 34'; Kerr 59'	Stadium: Ashton Gate; Attendance: 9,442; Referee: Amy Fearn

21 January 2024 11	Brighton & Hove Albion	3–2	Bristol City	Crawley
14:00	Terland 31', 90+5'; Robinson 57'	Report	Rodgers (yellow card) 52'; Harrison 55'; Jones 83'	Stadium: Broadfield Stadium; Attendance: 2,049; Referee: Lisa Benn

28 January 2024 12	Bristol City	1–2	West Ham United	Bristol
14:00	Connolly (yellow card) 46'; Thestrup 48'; Powell (yellow card) 90+8'	Report	Hayashi 13'; Harries (yellow card) 23'; Asseyi 55'; Shimizu (yellow card) 90+5'; Smith (yellow card) 90+14'	Stadium: Ashton Gate; Attendance: 6,214; Referee: Lauren Impey

3 February 2024 13	Aston Villa	2–2	Bristol City	Walsall
12:30	Nobbs 13'; Leon 60'	Report	Napier (yellow card) 11'; Thestrup 15'; Jones 75'; Hayles (yellow card) 83'; Yáñez (yellow card) 90+2'	Stadium: Bescot Stadium; Attendance: 2,190; Referee: Stacey Pearson

18 February 2024 14	Leicester City	5–2	Bristol City	Leicester
15:00	Momiki 33'; Takarada 45+1'; Cayman 54'; Rantala 76', (yellow card) 81'; Draper 89'	Report	Morgan 20'; Powell (yellow card) 24'; Napier (yellow card) 63'; Thestrup 49'	Stadium: King Power Stadium; Attendance: 2,219; Referee: Stacey Pearson

3 March 2024 15	Bristol City	3–7	Brighton & Hove Albion	Bristol
14:00	Powell (yellow card) 22'; Connolly 47'; Aspin 71'; Thestrup 74'	Report	Terland 20', 54'; Bremer 24'; Pinto 64', (yellow card) 90'; Haley 89'; Losada 90+2' (pen.); Robinson 90+6'	Stadium: Ashton Gate; Attendance: 3,468; Referee: Adewunmi Soneye

17 March 2024 16	Manchester United	2–0	Bristol City	Leigh
12:00	Naalsund 9', 90+5'	Report	Napier (yellow card) 2' (yellow-red card) 82'; Harrison (yellow card) 90+9'	Stadium: Leigh Sports Village; Attendance: 4,254; Referee: Elizabeth Simms

24 March 2024 17	Bristol City	0–1	Tottenham Hotspur	Bristol
14:00	Ward (yellow card) 89'	Report	England 2'	Stadium: Ashton Gate; Attendance: 5,262; Referee: Phoebe Cross

14 April 2024 18	Arsenal	5–0	Bristol City	Borehamwood
18:45	Mead 7', 32'; Powell 34' (o.g.); Rusoo 59', 73'	Report		Stadium: Meadow Park; Attendance: 3,565; Referee: Lisa Benn
Note: Rescheduled from 31 March 2024 due to Arsenal's participation in the 2024 FA Women's League Cup final.

20 April 2024 19	Bristol City	0–1	Liverpool	Bristol
12:30	Aspin (yellow card) 25'	Report	Höbinger 13'; Kearns (yellow card) 35'; Haug (yellow card) 85'	Stadium: Ashton Gate; Attendance: 4,780; Referee: Phoebe Cross

28 April 2024 20	Bristol City	0–4	Manchester City	Bristol
18:45		Report	Fowler 62', 75'; Rodgers 77' (o.g.); Greenwood 90+9'	Stadium: Ashton Gate; Attendance: 8,749; Referee: Cheryl Foster

5 May 2024 21	Chelsea	8–0	Bristol City	Kingston upon Thames
18:45	Reiten 6' (pen.), 56', 70', 77'; Nüsken 23'; Beever-Jones 52', 88'; Charles 74'	Report	Rodgers (yellow card) 86'	Stadium: Kingsmeadow; Attendance: 4,289; Referee: Stacey Fullicks

18 May 2024 22	Bristol City	0–4	Everton	Bristol
15:00		Report	Snoeijs 16'; S. Holmgaard 23'; Bissell 48'; Piemonte 90+4'	Stadium: Ashton Gate; Attendance: 4,112; Referee: Grace Lowe

=== League table ===
Pos	Team	Pld	W	D	L	GF	GA	GD	Pts	Qualification or relegation
8	Everton	22	6	5	11	24	37	−13	23	
9	Brighton & Hove Albion	22	5	4	13	26	48	−22	19	
10	Leicester City	22	4	6	12	26	45	−19	18	
11	West Ham United	22	3	6	13	20	45	−25	15	
12	Bristol City (R)	22	1	3	18	20	70	−50	6	Relegation to the Championship

Source: Women's Super League Table
Rules for classification: 1) Points; 2) Goal difference; 3) Number of goals scored.
(R) Relegated

== Women's FA Cup ==
As a member of the first tier, Bristol City entered the FA Cup in the fourth round proper.

14 January 2024 Fourth round	Bristol City	0–1	Liverpool	Bristol
13:00	Mustaki (yellow card) 36'	Report	Holland (yellow card) 39' (yellow-red card) 60'; Bonner 85'	Stadium: Ashton Gate; Attendance: 2,563; Referee: Lisa Benn

== FA Women's League Cup ==
11 October 2023 Group stage	Bristol City	1–1 (3–4 p)	Southampton	Failand
19:30	Furness 33'	Report	Lloyd-Smith 50'; Peake (yellow card) 87'	Stadium: Robins HPC; Attendance: 597; Referee: Will Finnie
	Penalties
	Rodgers (penalty missed); Teisar (penalty scored); Ward (penalty scored); Jones (penalty scored); Napier (penalty missed); Aspin (penalty missed)		(penalty scored) Peake; (penalty missed) Peplow; (penalty scored) Purfield; (penalty missed) Thompson; (penalty scored) Kraft; (penalty scored) Morris

9 November 2023 Group stage	Arsenal	3–1	Bristol City	Borehamwood
19:00	Maanum 27'; Wubben-Moy 36'; Blackstenius 90+5'	Report	Struck 70'	Stadium: Meadow Park; Attendance: 1,974; Referee: Lisa Benn

22 November 2023 Group stage	Tottenham Hotspur	3–0	Bristol City	Leyton
19:30	Graham 19' (pen.); Ayane 29', 72'; Percival (yellow card) 31'	Report	Aspin (yellow card) 35'	Stadium: Brisbane Road; Attendance: 506; Referee: Sunny Singh Gill

13 December 2023 Group stage	Bristol City	1–1 (4–5 p)	Reading	Failand
19:30	Hayles 21'; Kendall (yellow card) 90+6'	Report	Mayi Kith (yellow card) 68'; Wellings 86'	Stadium: Robins HPC; Attendance: 648; Referee: Lisa Benn
	Penalties
	Rodgers (penalty missed); Jones (penalty scored); Woolley (penalty scored); Hayles (penalty scored); Thestrup (penalty scored); Napier (penalty missed)		(penalty scored) Troelsgaard; (penalty scored) Wade; (penalty scored) Wellings; (penalty scored) Primmer; (penalty missed) Woodham; (penalty scored) Houssein

Pos	Team	Pld	W	PW	PL	L	GF	GA	GD	Pts	Qualification	ARS	TOT	SOU	BRI	REA
1	Arsenal (Q)	4	3	1	0	0	14	5	+9	11	Advanced to knock-out stage	—	3–3	–	3–1	–
2	Tottenham Hotspur (Q)	4	3	0	1	0	15	3	+12	10	Possible knock-out stage based on ranking	–	—	–	3–0	6–0
3	Southampton	4	1	1	0	2	3	6	−3	5		1–2	0–3	—	–	–
4	Bristol City	4	0	0	2	2	3	8	−5	2		–	–	1–1	—	1–1
5	Reading	4	0	1	0	3	1	14	−13	2		0–6	–	0–1	–	—

Updated to match(es) played on 24 January 2024. Source: FA Women's League Cup
Rules for classification: 1) Points; 2) Goal difference; 3) Number of goals scored; 4) Number of wins; 5) Head-to-head record
(Q) Qualified to the phase indicated

== Squad statistics ==
=== Appearances ===
As of match played 18 May 2024

Starting appearances are listed first, followed by substitute appearances after the + symbol where applicable.

No.	Pos	Nat	Player	Total		WSL		FA Cup		League Cup	
No.	Pos	Nat	Player	Apps	Goals	Apps	Goals	Apps	Goals	Apps	Goals
1	GK	(England) ENG	Fran Bentley	5	0	5	0	0	0	0	0
2	DF	(Wales) WAL	Ella Powell	22	1	18+2	1	1	0	1	0
3	DF	(Denmark) DEN	Sille Struck	13	1	8+1	0	0	0	4	1
4	DF	(England) ENG	Naomi Layzell	19	0	15+1	0	1	0	0+2	0
5	DF	(England) ENG	Brooke Aspin	20	2	16+1	2	0	0	2+1	0
6	MF	(Republic of Ireland) IRL	Megan Connolly	25	1	22	1	1	0	2	0
7	FW	(Scotland) SCO	Abi Harrison	16	1	8+7	1	1	0	0	0
8	MF	(England) ENG	Amy Rodgers	26	1	22	1	1	0	1+2	0
9	FW	(Jamaica) JAM	Shania Hayles	19	1	3+12	0	0	0	4	1
10	MF	(Northern Ireland) NIR	Rachel Furness	12	2	7+3	1	0	0	1+1	1
11	DF	(Scotland) SCO	Jamie-Lee Napier	22	0	18+1	0	1	0	1+1	0
12	DF	(Republic of Ireland) IRL	Chloe Mustaki	11	0	5+1	0	1	0	3+1	0
13	GK	(Wales) WAL	Olivia Clark	8	0	6+1	0	0	0	1	0
15	MF	(England) ENG	Jasmine Bull	13	0	3+6	0	0	0	4	0
16	DF	(England) ENG	Emily Syme	27	0	11+11	0	1	0	4	0
17	FW	(Denmark) DEN	Amalie Thestrup	26	9	22	9	1	0	0+3	0
18	MF	(Canada) CAN	Sarah Stratigakis	6	0	1+5	0	0	0	0	0
22	MF	(Scotland) SCO	Lisa Evans	9	0	3+6	0	0	0	0	0
23	FW	(Wales) WAL	Carrie Jones	23	3	16+2	3	1	0	1+3	0
24	FW	(Wales) WAL	Ffion Morgan	24	1	19+3	1	0+1	0	1	0
25	GK	(England) ENG	Erin Foley	0	0	0	0	0	0	0	0
29	DF	(England) ENG	Mari Ward	26	0	1+20	0	0+1	0	4	0
30	GK	(United States) USA	Shae Yáñez	8	0	7	0	1	0	0	0
36	MF	(England) ENG	Fearne Slocombe	1	0	0+1	0	0	0	0	0
38	MF	(Wales) WAL	Manon Pearce	2	0	0	0	0	0	0+2	0
39	FW	(England) ENG	Maya Kendall	3	0	0+1	0	0	0	1+1	0
44	DF	(Jamaica) JAM	Satara Murray	5	0	2+2	0	0	0	1	0
Players who appeared for the club but left during the season:
19	DF	(England) ENG	Jess Simpson	2	0	0+1	0	0	0	1	0
21	GK	(United States) USA	Kaylan Marckese	5	0	4	0	0	0	1	0
41	GK	(Norway) NOR	Benedicte Håland	3	0	0+1	0	0	0	2	0
Players away from the club on loan:
27	FW	(England) ENG	Jesse Woolley	4	0	0+1	0	0	0	2+1	0
28	FW	(Wales) WAL	Tianna Teisar	5	0	0+1	0	0	0	2+2	0

== Transfers ==
=== Transfers in ===
Date	Position	Nationality	Name	From	Ref.
3 July 2023	MF	(England)	Amy Rodgers	(England) London City Lionesses	
26 July 2023	DF	(Jamaica)	Satara Murray	(United States) Racing Louisville	
14 August 2023	DF	(Scotland)	Jamie-Lee Napier	(England) London City Lionesses	
14 August 2023	FW	(Denmark)	Amalie Thestrup	(Netherlands) PSV	
24 August 2023	MF	(Republic of Ireland)	Megan Connolly	(England) Brighton & Hove Albion	
6 September 2023	FW	(Wales)	Carrie Jones	(England) Manchester United	
13 September 2023	DF	(Denmark)	Sille Struck	(Spain) Levante Las Planas	
19 November 2023	GK	(Norway)	Benedicte Håland	(Scotland) Hibernian	
5 January 2024	GK	(United States)	Shae Yáñez	(United States) San Diego Wave	
20 January 2024	MF	(Canada)	Sarah Stratigakis	(Sweden) Vittsjö GIK	
25 January 2024	MF	(Scotland)	Lisa Evans	(England) West Ham United	

=== Loans in ===
Date	Position	Nationality	Name	From	Until	Ref.
7 July 2023	DF	(England)	Brooke Aspin	(England) Chelsea	End of season	
2 August 2023	GK	(United States)	Kaylan Marckese	(England) Arsenal	4 January 2024	
14 September 2023	DF	(England)	Jess Simpson	(England) Manchester United	21 October 2023	

=== Transfers out ===
Date	Position	Nationality	Name	To	Ref.
1 May 2023	DF	(England)	Lia Cataldo	(England) Crystal Palace	
1 May 2023	FW	(England)	Lily Greenslade	(England) Rugby Borough	
1 May 2023	DF	(England)	Jodie Hutton	(England) Sheffield United	
1 May 2023	MF	(England)	Aimee Palmer	(England) Leicester City	
1 May 2023	MF	(Wales)	Chloe Bull	(Wales) Swansea City	
12 May 2023	MF	(England)	Elysia Boddy	(England) Newcastle United	
7 July 2023	DF	(England)	Brooke Aspin	(England) Chelsea	
4 September 2023	DF	(United States)	Vicky Bruce	(Australia) Western Sydney Wanderers	
19 January 2024	GK	(Norway)	Benedicte Håland	(England) Southampton	

=== Loans out ===
Date	Position	Nationality	Name	To	Until	Ref.
30 July 2023	DF	(England)	Maddi Wilde	(England) London City Lionesses	End of season	
1 August 2023	GK	(Wales)	Olivia Clark	(England) Watford	8 October 2023	
12 January 2024	FW	(England)	Jesse Woolley	(England) Reading	End of season	
22 January 2024	FW	(Wales)	Tianna Teisar	(Wales) Cardiff City Ladies	End of season	
