= Jasmine Bull =

English footballer

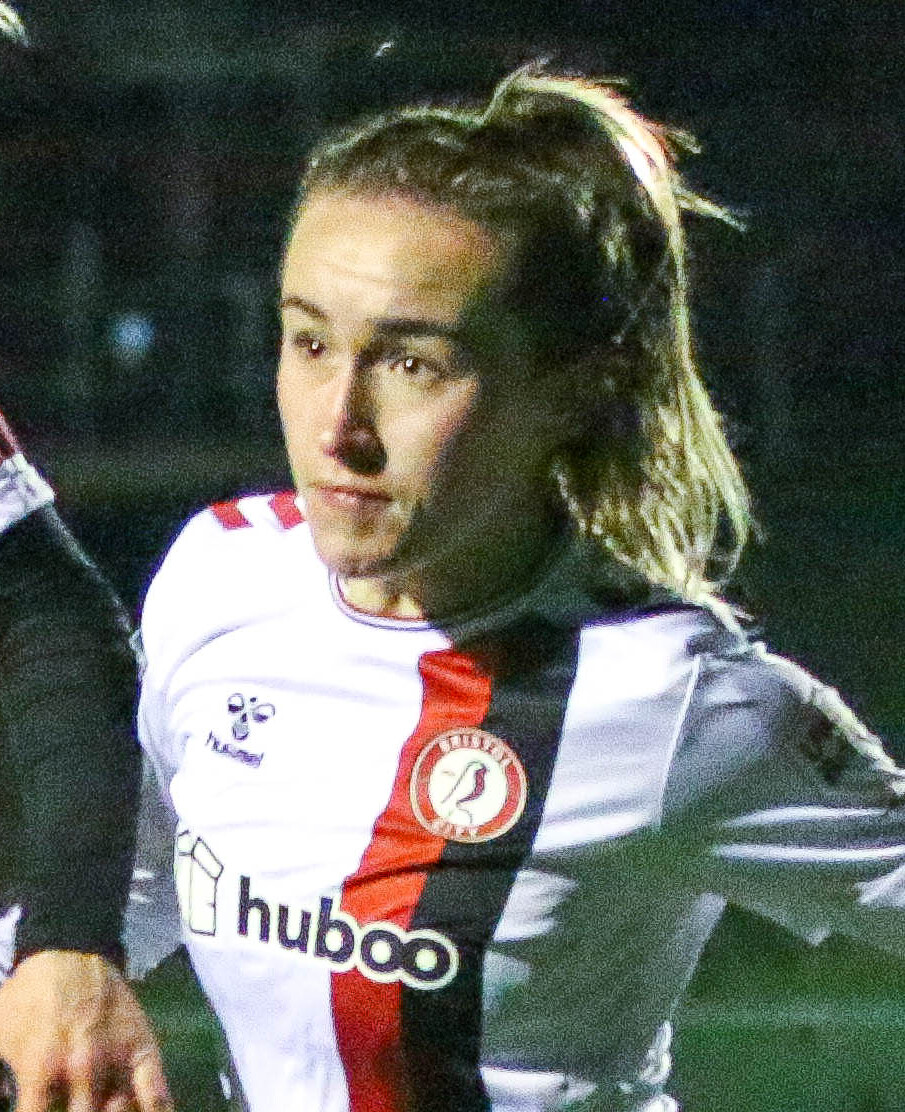
- Bull playing for Bristol City in 2023

Personal information
- Full name: Jasmine Olivia Fiona Bull
- Date of birth: 11 October 2002 (age 24)
- Position: Defender

Team information
- Current team: Portsmouth
- Number: 2

Senior career*
Years	Team	Apps	(Gls)
2019	Keynsham Town	0	(0)
2019–2020	Bristol Rovers	5	(3)
2020	Cheltenham Town (dual reg)	4	(0)
2021–2025	Bristol City	24	(1)
2025	→ Portsmouth (loan)	10	(0)
2025–	Portsmouth	0	(0)

International career^{‡}
2023–	Scotland U23	1	(0)
- * Club domestic league appearances and goals as of 15 April 2024 ‡ National team caps and goals as of 31 December 2023

Jasmine Olivia Fiona Bull (born 11 October 2002) is a professional footballer who plays as a defender for Women's Super League 2 club Portsmouth, which she captains, and the Scotland under-23 team. She previously played non-league football for Keynsham Town, Bristol Rovers and Cheltenham Town. She has also previously played Women's Super League football for Bristol City

== Early life ==
Bull began playing football for Yate United boys’ team aged 6 and continued playing in boys' teams until she joined Wotton Rovers girls team aged 12. She then played for Keynsham Girls team, twice winning the league and county cup, before joining Bristol Rovers.

== Club career ==
In January 2020, Bull signed for National League Division 1 South West club Cheltenham Town, for the 2019–20 season, as part of a dual registration with Bristol Rovers.

In August 2021, ahead of the 2021–22 season, Bull joined Bristol City's first team. On November 17, 2021, she made her debut for Bristol City in a 3–1 home win over Lewes.

On 13 June 2022, Bull signed her first professional contract with Bristol City.

On 16 April 2023, in the 2022–23 season, she scored her debut goal for City against Sunderland in a 5–0 win, with her first touch of the ball as an 87th-minute substitute.

Bull signed a new one-year contract with City on 27 May 2023. She was named Bristol City Women's PFA Community Champion for 2023 for the second consecutive year.

With Bristol City, Bull made her WSL debut on 3 February 2024, coming on as a substitute for Ffion Morgan during stoppage time at the end of a 2–2 draw with Aston Villa.

Having played in the second half of the 2024-25 season on loan with Portsmouth, it was announced that she had signed permanently with the club on 5 July 2025.

== International career ==
On 23 November 2023, Bull was named in the Scotland U23 squad for a friendly match against the Netherlands.

== Career statistics ==
As of match played 14 April 2024

Appearances and goals by club, season and competition
Club	Season	League			FA Cup		League cup (Note: Includes FA Women's National League Cup, Gordon Perrett Memorial Cup, FA Women's League Cup)		Other		Total	
Club	Season	Division	Apps	Goals	Apps	Goals	Apps	Goals	Apps	Goals	Apps	Goals
Keynsham Town	2019–20	FA WNL Southern Premier	0	0	0	0	1	0	0	0	1	0
Bristol Rovers	2019–20	GCWFL Division 1	5	3	—		1	4	2 (Note: Two appearances in Gloucestershire County Women's Trophy)	0	8	7
Cheltenham Town (dual reg)	2019–20	FA WNL Division 1 South West	4	0	0	0	0	0	0	0	4	0
Bristol City	2021–22	Women's Championship	9	0	0	0	2	0	—		11	0
Bristol City	2022–23	Women's Championship	10	1	1	0	2	0	—		13	1
Bristol City	2023–24	Women's Super League	5	0	0	0	4	0	—		9	0
Bristol City	Total		24	1	1	0	8	0	—		33	1
Career total			33	4	1	0	10	4	2	0	46	8

== Honours ==
Bristol City

- Women's Championship: 2022–23

Individual

- Bristol City Women's PFA Community Champion: 2022, 2023
