= Mari Ward =

English footballer (born 2006)

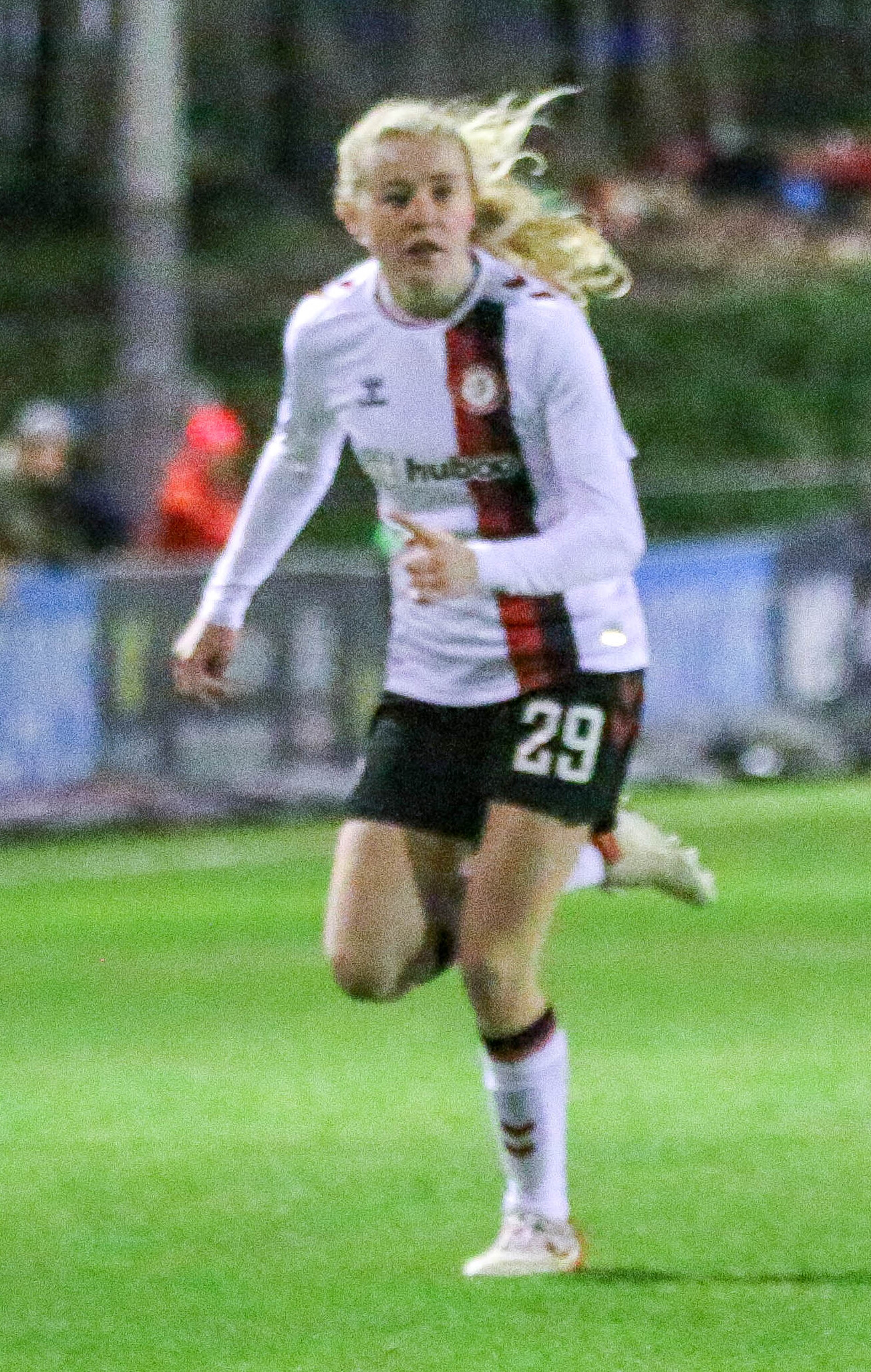
- Ward playing for Bristol City in 2023

Personal information
- Full name: Mari Bee Ward
- Date of birth: 3 January 2006 (age 20)
- Place of birth: England
- Positions: Wing-back; midfielder

Team information
- Current team: Liverpool
- Number: 28

Youth career
- 2022: Bristol City

Senior career*
Years	Team	Apps	(Gls)
2021–2022	Plymouth Argyle	10	(3)
2022–2026	Bristol City	53	(3)
2026–	Liverpool	0	(0)

International career^{‡}
2023	England U17	9	(1)
2023–2025	England U19	17	(1)
2025–	England U23	3	(0)
- * Club domestic league appearances and goals as of 31 January 2026 ‡ National team caps and goals as of 1 December 2025

Mari Bee Ward (born 3 January 2006) is an English professional footballer who plays as a wing-back and midfielder for Women's Super League club Liverpool and the England under-23 national team.

== Early career ==
Ward joined the Bristol City academy from Plymouth Argyle in the summer of 2022. She scored three goals in ten matches for Plymouth at senior level in the National League, followed by five goals in twelve appearances for Bristol City Reserves, prior to joining the first team in 2023.

== Club career ==
On 15 January 2023, Ward made her full debut for Bristol City against Coventry City in a 3–2 victory.

On 3 January 2024, after more than 25 appearances, she signed her first professional contract with Bristol City on her 18th birthday.

On 3 November 2024, Ward scored her debut Women's Championship goal against Sunderland, taking the lead for Bristol City in a 4–3 win. She scored her second goal a week later to take the lead against Newcastle United in a 2–0 victory, and was described as the player of the match by SportsByte.

On 2 July 2026, Ward signed with Women's Super League club Liverpool. She will wear the number 28 for the club.

== International career ==
Ward has represented England about under-17 and under-19 youth level.

On May 20 2023, she scored her debut youth international goal against France in the 2023 UEFA Women's Under-17 Championship in a 1–1 draw, having received a red card six days previously for denying a goal scoring opportunity in the opening match against Poland. Ward also played in the semi-finals of the tournament, where the under-17s lost 3–1 to Spain.

In October 2023 for 2024 UEFA Women's Under-19 Championship qualification, Ward featured as part of the starting eleven for round one wins against Wales and Czech Republic.

== Honours ==
Bristol City

- Women's Championship: 2022–23

Individual

- Bristol City Women Academy Player of the Year: 2023
