= Naomi Layzell =

English footballer (born 2004)

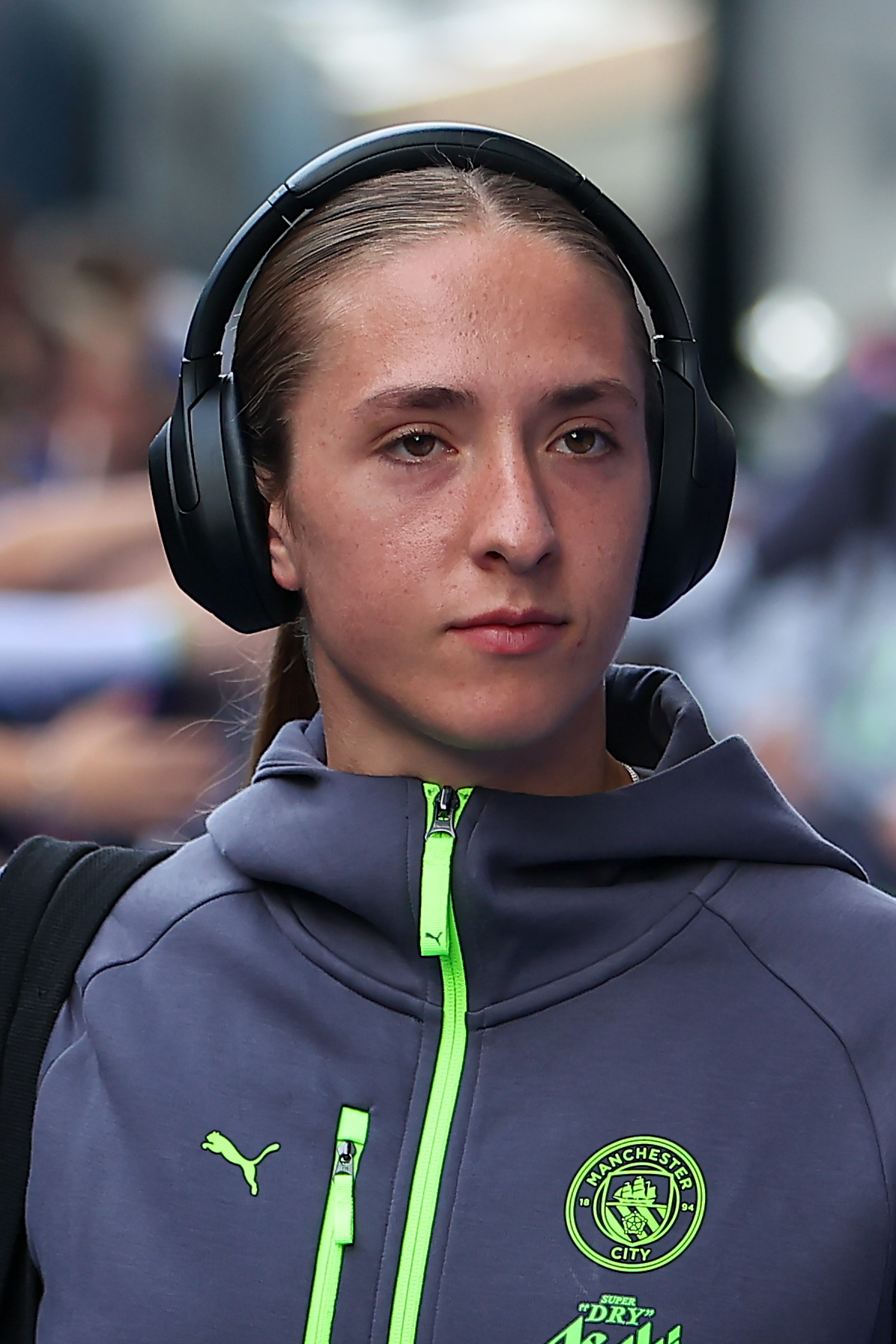
- Layzell in 2025

Personal information
- Full name: Naomi Elisabeth Layzell
- Date of birth: 29 February 2004 (age 22)
- Place of birth: Gloucester, England
- Height: 5 ft 9 in (1.75 m)
- Position: Centre-back

Team information
- Current team: Everton (on loan from Manchester City)
- Number: 5

Youth career
- Gloucester City
- Bristol City

Senior career*
Years	Team	Apps	(Gls)
2020–2024	Bristol City	60	(0)
2024–	Manchester City	9	(0)
2026–	→ Everton (loan)	1	(0)

International career^{‡}
2019	England U15	1	(0)
2021–	England U17	3	(0)
2022–2023	England U19	5	(0)
2023–	England U23	10	(0)
- * Club domestic league appearances and goals as of 04:58, 15 September 2026 (UTC) ‡ National team caps and goals as of 22:14, 23 October 2025 (UTC)

Naomi Elisabeth Layzell (born 29 February 2004) is an English professional footballer who plays as a centre back for Women's Super League club Everton, on loan from Manchester City, and the England under-23s.

== Club career ==
Layzell made her first team debut for Bristol City in the FA Women's League Cup in a 4–0 win over London Bees on 7 October 2020, and made her first appearance in the Women's Super League against Manchester City on 7 November 2020.

On 19 August 2024, Layzell signed for Manchester City on a four-year deal. She scored her first goal at club level during a 2–0 UEFA Women's Champions League win against Barcelona on 9 October 2024.

On 27 July 2026, Layzell joined Everton on loan for the 2026–27 season.

== International career ==
Layzell has been featured throughout at all youth levels of the England national team set-up. During a training camp attended by the England under-23 and senior squads in February 2024, Layzell was one of the members of the under-23 team who trained with the senior squad.

== Career statistics ==
=== Club ===
As of match played 13 September 2026

Appearances and goals by club, season and competition
Club	Season	League			FA Cup		League Cup		Europe		Total	
Club	Season	Division	Apps	Goals	Apps	Goals	Apps	Goals	Apps	Goals	Apps	Goals
Bristol City	2020–21	Women's Super League	7	0	1	0	4	0	—		12	0
Bristol City	2021–22	Championship	17	0	2	0	3	0	—		22	0
Bristol City	2022–23	Championship	20	0	3	0	4	0	—		27	0
Bristol City	2023–24	Women's Super League	16	0	1	0	2	0	—		19	0
Bristol City	Total		60	0	7	0	13	0	—		80	0
Manchester City	2024–25	Women's Super League	6	0	3	0	1	0	4	1	14	1
Manchester City	2025–26	Women's Super League	3	0	0	0	2	0	—		5	0
Manchester City	Total		9	0	3	0	3	0	4	1	19	1
Everton (loan)	2026–27	Women's Super League	1	0	0	0	0	0	—		1	0
Career Total			70	0	10	0	16	0	4	1	100	1

== Honours ==
Bristol City

- Women's Championship: 2022–23

Manchester City

- Women's Super League: 2025–26

Individual

- Bristol City Young Player Of The Year Award: 2023–24
- Bristol City Players Player Of The Year Award: 2023–24
