= Shae Yanez =

American soccer player (born 1998)

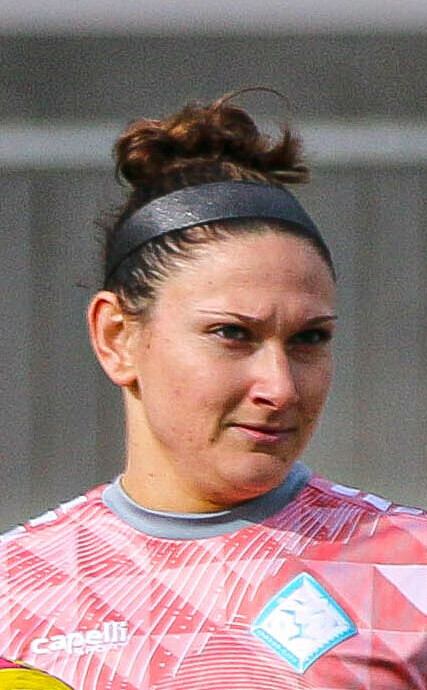
- London City Lionesses 2023

Personal information
- Full name: Jessica Shae Yáñez Couey
- Date of birth: May 22, 1997 (age 29)
- Place of birth: Macon, Georgia, U.S.
- Position: Goalkeeper

Team information
- Current team: Crystal Palace
- Number: 30

College career
Years	Team	Apps	(Gls)
2015–2018	Tennessee Volunteers	56	(0)

Senior career*
Years	Team	Apps	(Gls)
2019	Washington Spirit	1	(0)
2020–2023	London City Lionesses	63	(0)
2023	San Diego Wave	4	(0)
2024	Bristol City	7	(0)
2024–	Crystal Palace	5	(0)
- * Club domestic league appearances and goals as of 20 October 2024

Jessica Shae Yáñez Couey (Latin American Spanish pronunciation: [ˈɟʝaɲes ˈka(ɣ)wi]; born May 22, 1997) is an American soccer player who plays as a goalkeeper for Women's Super League club Crystal Palace.

== Early and personal life ==
Yanez was born in 1997 in Macon, Georgia, the youngest of three siblings. She grew up in Downingtown, Pennsylvania, and played trombone as a child. She studied construction management and attended the University of Tennessee in the United States.

== Club career ==
Early in her career, Yanez played for Spanish side Santa Teresa and the University of Tennessee.

In April 2019, she joined National Women's Soccer League side Washington Spirit.

On July 16, 2020, Yanez signed for Women's Championship club London City Lionesses, signing further contracts in April 2021 ahead of the 2021–22 season, and the 2022–23 season. On August 22, 2022, she became the third player to reach 50 appearances for the Lionesses.

Over the course of three seasons and 72 appearances for the team, Yanez kept a total of 24 clean sheets for the Lionesses, and acted as co-captain for two of those seasons.

On April 26, 2023, Yanez signed for National Women's Soccer League side San Diego Wave, signing a two-year deal with the club, on a free transfer from the Lionesses. On January 5, 2024, she signed for Women's Super League side Bristol City, for an undisclosed transfer fee.

On August 2, 2024, Yanez signed for newly promoted Women's Super League club Crystal Palace.

== Style of play ==
Yanez operates as a goalkeeper. She is known for her leadership.

== Honours ==
London City Lionesses

- Women's Championship: 2021–22 runner-up

Individual

- London City Lionesses Player of the Season: 2021–22
