= Brooke Aspin =

English footballer (born 2005)

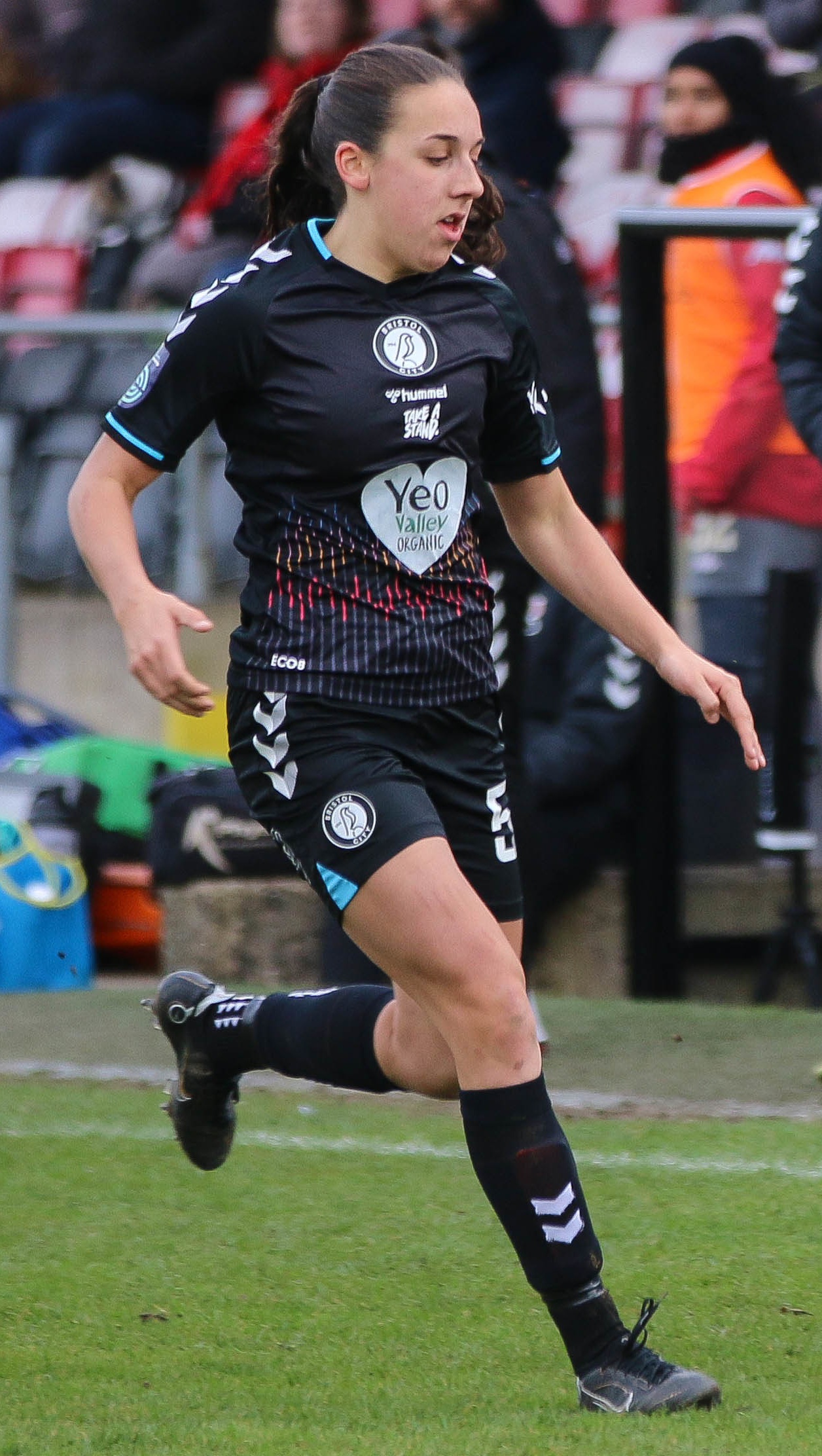
- Aspin playing for Bristol City in 2022

Personal information
- Full name: Brooke Kay Aspin
- Date of birth: 1 July 2005 (age 21)
- Place of birth: Tiverton, England
- Height: 1.71 m (5 ft 7 in)
- Position: Centre-back

Team information
- Current team: Bristol City

Youth career
- Bristol City

Senior career*
Years	Team	Apps	(Gls)
2021–2023	Bristol City	26	(1)
2023–2026	Chelsea	0	(0)
2023–2024	→ Bristol City (loan)	17	(2)
2024	→ Crystal Palace (loan)	4	(0)
2026–	Bristol City	0	(0)

International career^{‡}
2022	England U17	3	(1)
2021–2024	England U19	9	(0)
2023–	England U23	2	(0)
- * Club domestic league appearances and goals as of 17:19, 16 July 2026 (UTC) ‡ National team caps and goals as of 19:47, 28 November 2024 (UTC)

Brooke Kay Aspin (born 1 July 2005) is an English professional footballer who plays as a centre-back for Women's Super League 2 club Bristol City and the England under-23s.

She has previously captained England at youth level, and played for Crystal Palace.

== Early life ==
Aspin was born on 1 July 2005 in Tiverton, Devon.

She attended Wellesley Park Primary School. At 13, she was appointed captain of England Schools’ U15 team for an international tournament in Salou, Spain.

== Club career ==
=== Bristol City, 2021–23 ===
Aspin is a product of the Bristol City academy, having joined at the age of 14. She began training with the first team and made her senior debut at the age of 16.

She missed the majority of the 2022–23 season after contracting sepsis, before returning to play in March 2023 against Durham.

On 3 April 2023, Aspin scored her first goal for the club against Charlton Athletic in a 4–0 victory, helping the team to win the Women's Championship, and secure promotion back to the WSL.

=== Chelsea, 2023–26 ===
In July 2023, Aspin signed a four-year contract with Chelsea on a free transfer. Chelsea manager Emma Hayes described having "very high hopes" for the 18-year-old.

==== Bristol City (loan), 2023–24 ====
Aspin was loaned back to Bristol City for the 2023–24 season.

On 5 November 2023, Aspin scored her first WSL goal in a 3–2 victory over West Ham, helping to secure Bristol City's first WSL win of the 2023–24 season.

On 22 May 2024, Aspin returned to parent club Chelsea.

==== Crystal Palace (loan), 2024 ====
On 7 September 2024, Aspin joined newly promoted WSL club Crystal Palace on loan until the end of the 2024–25 season. On 22 September, she was sent off after receiving two yellow cards against Tottenham Hotspur, and served a one match ban against parent club Chelsea the following week.

On 4 January 2025, it was confirmed that Aspin had returned to Chelsea having suffered an ACL injury with the England under-23s in November 2024. Fellow Crystal Palace loanee Jorja Fox also returned to Chelsea having suffered an ACL injury of her own.

Aspin did not appear for Chelsea during the 2025–26 season due to her knee injury.

=== Return to Bristol City, 2026– ===
In July 2026, Aspin departed Chelsea and rejoined her academy club Bristol City on a permanent transfer.

== International career ==
In November 2021, Aspin was named as part of England's Development Phase squad.

In March 2022, she was named as part of England's squad for the 2022 under-17 Euro qualification, where she captained the team against France and Poland,. She scored her first youth international goal in an 8–0 victory against Croatia.

In September 2023, Aspin was included in the under-19 squad, playing against Denmark in a 3–3 victory, and captaining the team against Germany to a 3–3 draw. On 22 November 2023, she was named as part of the under-23 squad for matches against France and Spain, although remained at Bristol City awaiting injury assessment.

On 24 October 2024, Aspin made her debut for the under-23s against the Netherlands. In her second march for the under-23s against Norway on 28 November, she suffered an ACL injury.

== Personal life ==
Aspin was raised around football, with her father, uncle and grandfather all having played for local team Wellington AFC. Her great-grandfather was chairman of the club.

In August 2022, Aspin contracted sepsis following a bone infection. She spent 22 days in hospital and underwent surgery on her groin.

Aspin's uncle has Down syndrome; she has expressed wanting to coach people with Down syndrome following her football career.

== Career statistics ==
=== Club ===
As of match played 24 November 2024

Club	Season	League			FA Cup (Note: Includes the Women's FA Cup)		League Cup (Note: Includes the WSL Cup/Women's League Cup)		Total	
Club	Season	Division	Apps	Goals	Apps	Goals	Apps	Goals	Apps	Goals
Bristol City	2021–22	Championship	20	0	2 (Note: Appearances in R3 and R4)	0	4	0	26	0
Bristol City	2022–23	Championship	6	1	0	0	0	0	6	1
Bristol City	Total		26	1	2	0	4	0	32	1
Chelsea	2023–24	WSL	0	0	0	0	0	0	0	0
Bristol City (loan)	2023–24	WSL	17	2	0	0	3	0	20	2
Crystal Palace (loan)	2024–25	WSL	4	0	0	0	2	0	6	0
Career total			47	3	2	0	9	0	58	3

== Honours ==
Bristol City

- FA Women's Championship: 2022–23
