= Ella Powell =

Welsh football player

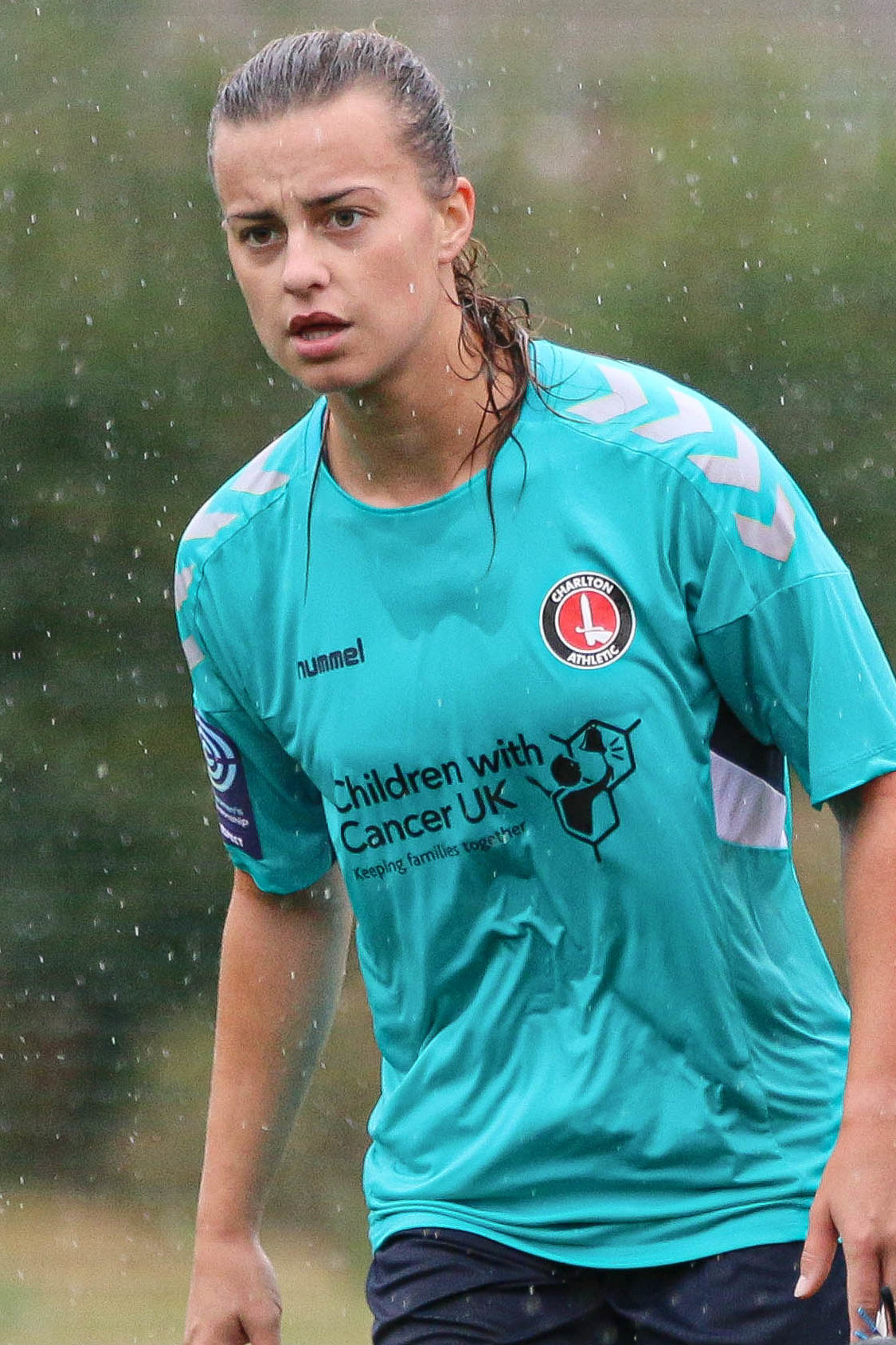
- Ella Powell in August 2020

Personal information
- Full name: Ella Mae Florence Powell
- Date of birth: 1 February 2000 (age 26)
- Place of birth: Cardiff, Wales
- Height: 5 ft 4 in (1.63 m)
- Positions: Defender; forward

Team information
- Current team: Bristol City
- Number: 2

Youth career
- Cardiff City Ladies

College career
Years	Team	Apps	(Gls)
2018	Georgia State Panthers	18	(0)

Senior career*
Years	Team	Apps	(Gls)
2016–2018	Cardiff City Ladies	19	(4)
2019–2020	Lewes	8	(0)
2020–2021	Charlton Athletic	13	(0)
2021–	Bristol City	77	(3)

International career^{‡}
2016–2017	Wales U17	8	(0)
2018	Wales U19	8	(2)
2018–	Wales	14	(0)
- * Club domestic league appearances and goals as of 29 May 2025 ‡ National team caps and goals as of 30 May 2025

Ella Mae Florence Powell (born 1 February 2000) is a Welsh footballer who plays as a defender for Women's Championship club Bristol City and the Wales national team.

== Background ==
Powell grew up in Radyr, Cardiff, attending both the Primary and Comprehensive schools in the area. She began playing football with the Radyr Rangers boys' club.

== Club career ==
Powell progressed through the Cardiff City Ladies youth team, before joining NCAA college team Georgia State Panthers in 2018. In June 2019, Powell returned to the UK to sign for Lewes in the FA Women's Championship. She left at the end of the 2019–20 season. On 12 August 2020, she joined Charlton Athletic for the season.

On 27 July 2021, Powell joined Bristol City ahead of the 2021–22 season. Powell was part of the squad that won the Women's Championship in 2022-23, earning promotion to the Women's Super League. On 4 July 2025, it was announced that Powell had signed a one-year contract extension with the Robins.

== International career ==
Powell played for Cymru's WU15s and WU16s and gained 8 caps in the WU17s in 2016-17. She played WU19s in 2018.

Powell made her debut for the Wales national team in the 1–0 friendly defeat against Portugal on 10 November 2018. She made her first start for the senior team in the next match on 13 November.

In June 2025, Powell was named in Wales' squad for UEFA Women's Euro 2025.

== Career statistics ==
=== Club ===
As of match played 4 May 2025

Club	Season	League			FA Cup (Note: includes Women's FA Cup)		League Cup (Note: includes WSL Cup/Women's League Cup)		Total	
Club	Season	Division	Apps	Goals	Apps	Goals	Apps	Goals	Apps	Goals
Cardiff City Ladies	2016–17	FA Women's National League	1	0	1	0	1	0	3	0
Cardiff City Ladies	2017–18	FA Women's National League	18	4	3	1	2	1	23	6
Cardiff City Ladies	Total		19	4	4	1	3	1	26	6
Lewes	2019–20	Championship	8	0	0	0	4	0	12	0
	Total		8	0	0	0	0	0	12	0
Charlton Athletic	2020–21	Championship	13	0	2	0	1	0	16	0
	Total		13	0	2	0	1	0	14	0
Bristol City	2021–22	Championship	18	0	2	0	4	0	24	0
Bristol City	2022–23	Championship	21	1	3	0	4	0	27	1
Bristol City	2023–24	Women's Super League	20	1	1	0	1	0	22	1
Bristol City	2024-25	Championship	15	1	2	1	2	0	19	2
Bristol City	2025-26	Championship	3	0	0	0	1	0	4	0
Bristol City	Total		77	3	8	1	11	0	96	4
Career total			117	7	14	2	19	1	148	10

=== International ===
As of matches played 5 July 2025, statistics from the Football Association of Wales

Appearances and goals by national team and year
National team	Year	Apps	Goals
Wales	2018	2	0
Wales	2023	3	0
Wales	2024	5	0
Wales	2025	5	0
Total		15	0

== Honours ==
Bristol City

- FA Women's Championship: 2022–23
