= Lexi Lloyd-Smith =

English footballer (born 2003)

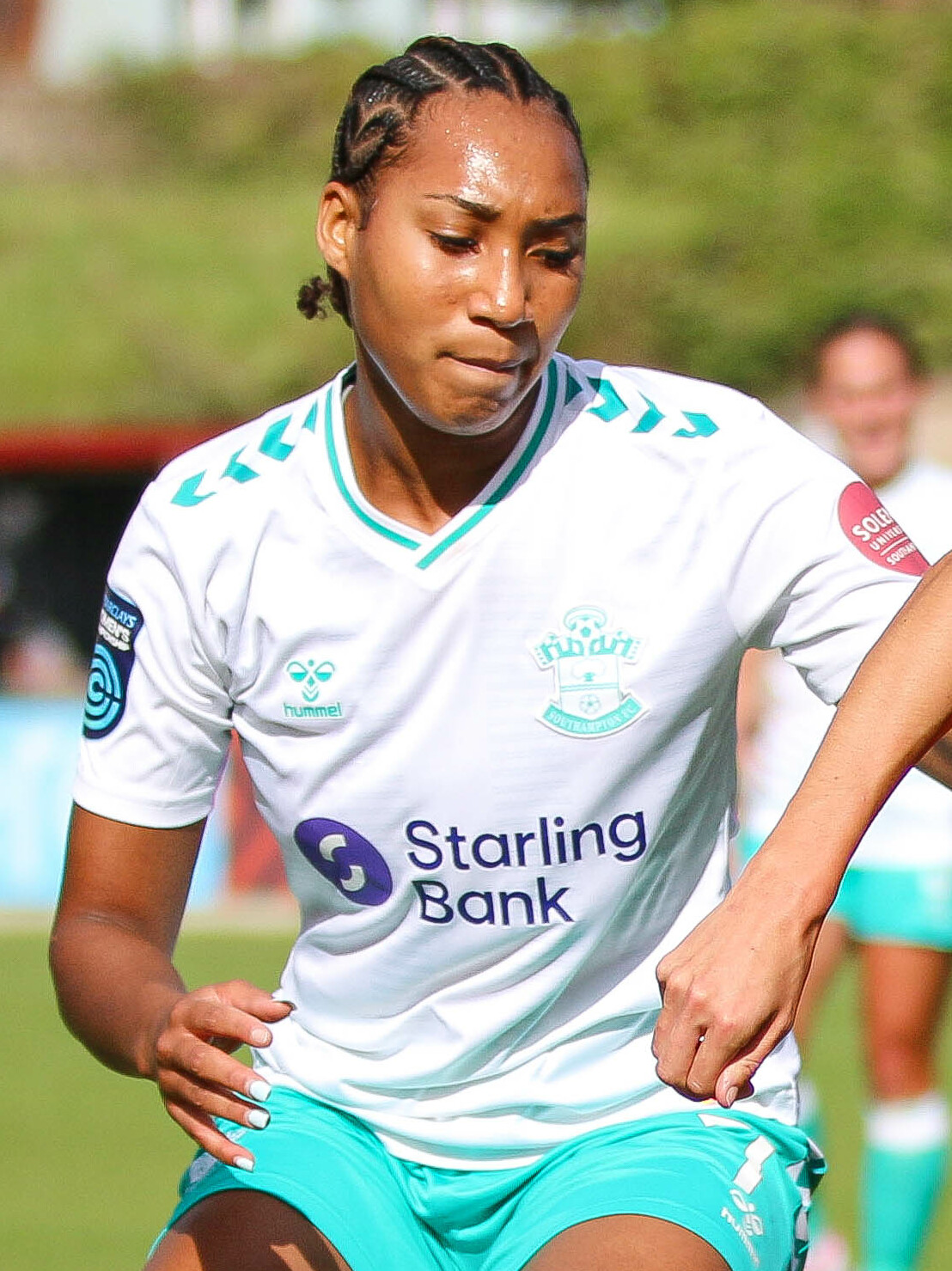
- Lloyd-Smith playing for Southampton in 2023

Personal information
- Full name: Lexi Lou Lloyd-Smith
- Date of birth: 5 March 2003 (age 23)
- Place of birth: England
- Positions: Forward; winger

Team information
- Current team: Crystal Palace

Youth career
- Arsenal
- Chelsea

Senior career*
| Years | Team | Apps | (Gls) |
| 2019–2020 | Chelsea | 0 | (0) |
| 2020–2021 | Charlton Athletic | 0 | (0) |
| 2022–2024 | Southampton | 33 | (2) |
| 2024–2026 | Bristol City | 19 | (10) |
| 2026– | Crystal Palace | 3 | (1) |

International career^{‡}
- England U15
| 2019 | England U17 | 3 | (0) |
| 2025– | England U23 | 2 | (0) |
- * Club domestic league appearances and goals as of 17:22, 16 July 2026 (UTC) ‡ National team caps and goals as of 22:32, 25 February 2025 (UTC)

Lexi Lou Lloyd-Smith (born 5 March 2003) is an English professional footballer who plays as a forward for Women's Super League club Crystal Palace and the England under-23s. She previously played for Bristol City, Southampton, Charlton Athletic, and college soccer side South Alabama Jaguars.

== Early career ==
Lloyd-Smith began her football career with the Arsenal Academy, playing four seasons with the youth set up, prior to a move to Chelsea, where she played two seasons in the WSL Academy.

On 28 January 2021, she signed for Women's Championship club Charlton Athletic, prior to playing college soccer for NCAA Division I side South Alabama Jaguars, scoring 3 goals in 13 appearances.

== Club career ==
=== Southampton ===
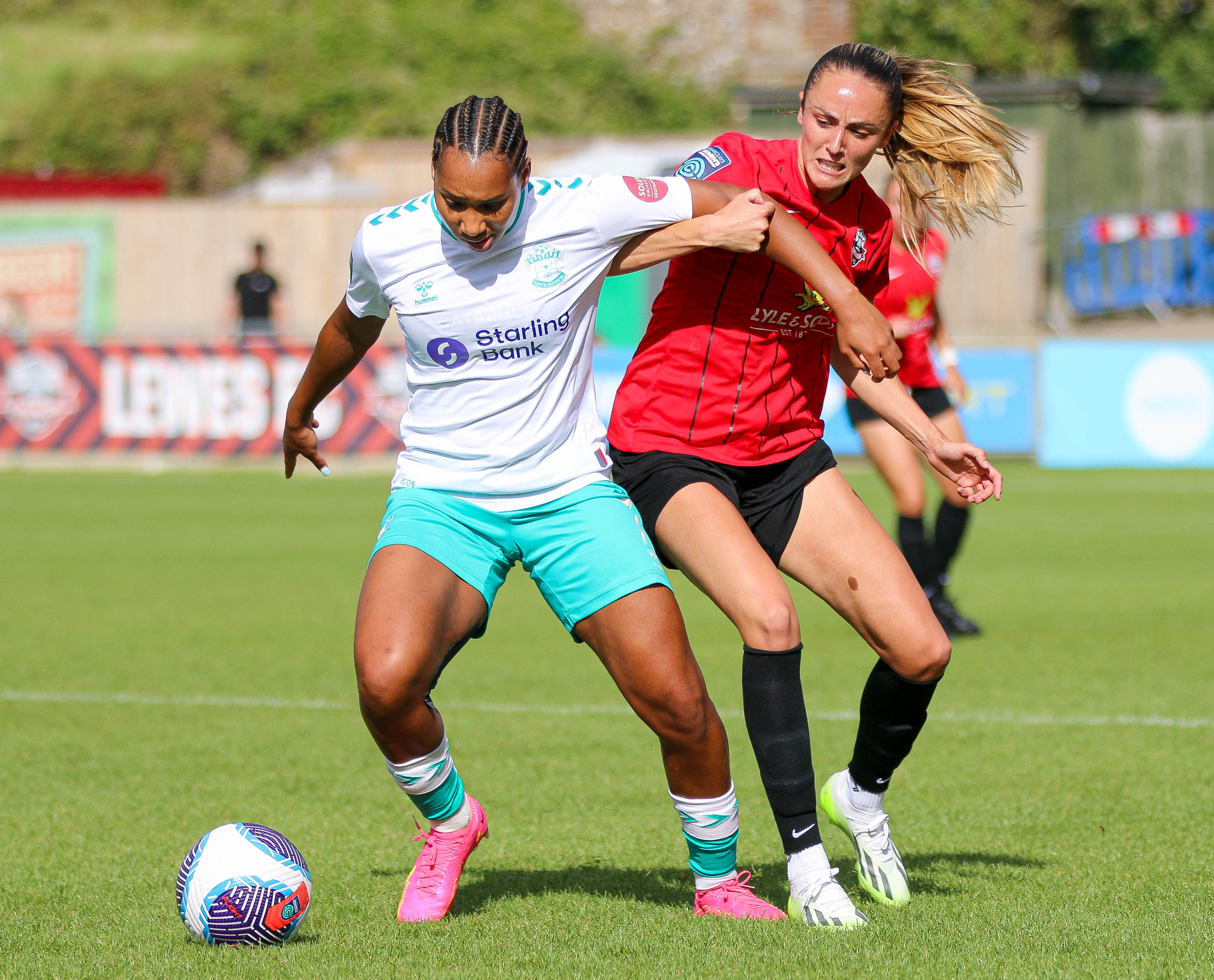
Lloyd-Smith playing for Southampton against Lewes in 2023.

On 21 July 2022, Lloyd-Smith signed for Southampton. On 22 September, during the 2022–23 season, she scored her debut goals in a 2–1 away victory over Crystal Palace.

On 23 November 2023, she played against Arsenal in the 2023–24 League Cup group stage, in front of a recording breaking attendance for the Saints. After the 2–1 defeat, she swapped shirts with Vivianne Miedema, her icon, who posted on Twitter with her shirt after the game.

In the fifth round of the 2023–24 FA Cup, where the Saints were defeated 3–1 by Manchester United, Lloyd-Smith scored the equalising goal as a second-half substitute.

She ended her two seasons with Southampton having scored five goals in 47 appearances across all competitions, during the 2022–23 and 2023–24 seasons.

=== Bristol City ===
On 4 June 2024 it was announced that Lloyd-Smith would be leaving Southampton, and a month later, she signed for Bristol City from Southampton on a two-year free transfer deal.

On 8 September, she scored her debut goal for City against her former club Southampton in a 1–1 draw. For October, having scored four goals during that month, Lloyd-Smith was nominated for the Women's Championship Player of the Month and Goal of the Month awards, that were both subsequently won by Maria Farrugia of Sheffield United.

After her first nine Championship appearances in the 2024–25 season she scored six goals, becoming the joint second highest scorer in November, behind Isobel Goodwin of London City Lionesses.

In July 2026, it was announced that Lloyd-Smith had departed City to ‘‘take the next steps in her career.’’

=== Crystal Palace ===
On 16 July 2026, it was announced that Lloyd-Smith had signed for newly-promoted Women's Super League club Crystal Palace.

On 6 September 2026, Lloyd-Smith scored her first Women's Super League goal for Crystal Palace, leading the side to a 1-0 victory away at Everton.

== International career ==
Lloyd-Smith has represented England at under-15, under-17 and under-23 youth level.

In October 2019, she featured in 2020 Under-17 Championship qualification for England, playing in winning matches against Croatia, Bosnia and Herzegovina, and Belgium.

In September 2022, Lloyd-Smith stated that her main goal was to return to the England youth set up.

In February 2025, she was called up to the under-23 squad, making her debut as a second-half substitute in a 3–2 defeat to Germany. On 2 March 2026, she scored the winning goal for the under-23s against France in a 1–0 victory. She featured in a 3–0 win over Sweden, helping England to win the 2025-26 U23 European Competition title on 17 April 2026.

== Style of play ==
She has been described as a fast and difficult striker who intimidates and threatens opposition defenders.
