= Abi Harrison =

Scottish footballer

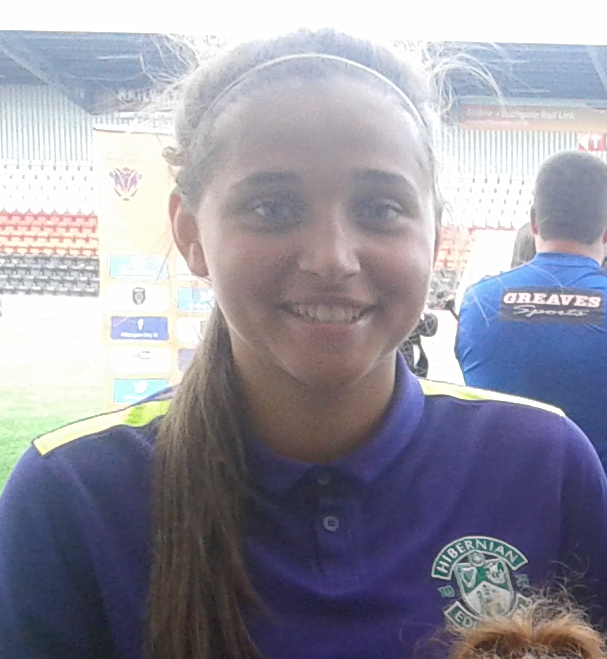
- Harrison during her spell with Hibernian in 2015

Personal information
- Full name: Abigail Harrison
- Date of birth: 7 December 1997 (age 28)
- Place of birth: London, England
- Position: Forward

Team information
- Current team: Glasgow City
- Number: 9

Youth career
- 2007–2011: Celtic

Senior career*
| Years | Team | Apps | (Gls) |
| 2011–2015 | Celtic | 27 | (8) |
| 2015–2019 | Hibernian | 88 | (75) |
| 2019–2025 | Bristol City | 103 | (29) |
| 2025 | Celtic | 12 | (3) |
| 2025– | Glasgow City | 12 | (4) |

International career^{‡}
| 2010–2011 | Scotland U15 | 3 | (0) |
| 2013 | Scotland U16 | 3 | (1) |
| 2012–2013 | Scotland U17 | 16 | (1) |
| 2014–2016 | Scotland U19 | 22 | (5) |
| 2018– | Scotland | 19 | (3) |
- * Club domestic league appearances and goals as of 15 February 2026 ‡ National team caps and goals as of 12 December 2023

Abigail Harrison (born 7 December 1997) is a Scottish footballer who plays as a forward for Glasgow City and the Scotland national team. She started her career at Celtic, and has also played for Hibernian and Bristol City.

== Club career ==
=== Scotland ===
Raised in the south of Glasgow where she attended Holyrood Secondary School, Harrison began her career with Celtic, making her debut aged 14 – the youngest player to appear in the Scottish Women's Premier League – before joining Hibernian in 2015.

Having already been in the team which won the Scottish Women's Cup in 2016, she scored the opening goal of the 2017 final as Hibernian defeated Glasgow City 3–0, and scored twice in the 2018 final, an 8–0 victory over Motherwell, although substituted through injury in the first half. Harrison also won three SWPL Cups (2016, 2017 and 2018) during her four-year spell with the Edinburgh club, but they finished runners-up behind Glasgow City in the league each season. She was the division's top goalscorer and Golden Boot winner in both 2017 (15 goals) and 2018 (25 goals).

=== England ===
Harrison signed for FA Women's Super League club Bristol City in January 2019. In November 2019 she suffered an anterior cruciate ligament injury, which ruled her out for at least the rest of the 2019–20 FA WSL season. She became available for selection again in August 2020, and was an unused substitute in the 2021 FA Women's League Cup Final (a defeat by Chelsea) in March 2021.

=== Returning to Scotland ===
On 23 January 2025, Harrison signed for Scottish Women's Premier League side Celtic for a second time, on a short contract until the end of the 2024–25 season.

On 16 July 2025, Harrison signed a one year contract with Glasgow City. She scored her first goal for the club in a 1–0 away win against Aberdeen.

== International career ==
Born in London, Harrison was eligible for Scotland, England or Jamaica due to her heritage.

She was called up to the full Scotland squad for the first time in September 2016, and made her full international debut in a friendly match against Russia in January 2018. She has also represented Scotland at Under-16, Under-17 and Under-19 level.

On her competitive debut for Scotland, against Ukraine in November 2021 in a 2023 FIFA Women's World Cup qualification – UEFA Group B fixture, Harrison scored a last minute equaliser with a header as the match ended 1–1.

== Career statistics ==
=== Club ===
As of 27 January 2025

| Club | Season | League | | | FA Cup (Note: Includes the Women's FA Cup) | | League Cup (Note: Includes the WSL Cup/Women's League Cup) | | Total | |
| Club | Season | Division | Apps | Goals | Apps | Goals | Apps | Goals | Apps | Goals |
|---|---|---|---|---|---|---|---|---|---|---|
| Bristol City | 2018–19 | FA WSL | 8 | 0 | 2 | 1 | 0 | 0 | 10 | 1 |
| Bristol City | 2019–20 | FA WSL | 6 | 1 | 1 | 0 | 3 | 2 | 10 | 3 |
| Bristol City | 2020–21 | FA WSL | 20 | 2 | 1 | 0 | 5 | 0 | 26 | 2 |
| Bristol City | 2021–22 | Championship | 22 | 17 | 2 | 2 | 3 | 2 | 27 | 21 |
| Bristol City | 2022–23 | Championship | 22 | 7 | 3 | 0 | 3 | 3 | 26 | 10 |
| Bristol City | 2023–24 | WSL | 15 | 1 | 1 | 0 | 0 | 0 | 16 | 1 |
| Bristol City | 2024–25 | Championship | 10 | 1 | 0 | 0 | 3 | 1 | 13 | 2 |
| Bristol City | Total | | 103 | 29 | 10 | 3 | 17 | 8 | 130 | 40 |

=== International appearances ===
Scotland statistics accurate as of match played 5 December 2023.

| Year | Scotland | |
| Year | Apps | Goals |
|---|---|---|
| 2018 | 1 | 0 |
| 2019 | 2 | 0 |
| 2020 | — | |
| 2021 | 2 | 1 |
| 2022 | 9 | 2 |
| 2023 | 5 | 0 |
| Total | 19 | 3 |

=== International goals ===
Results list Scotland's goal tally first.

| # | Date | Venue | Opponent | Result | Competition | Scored |
|---|---|---|---|---|---|---|
| 1 | 26 November 2021 | Hampden Park, Glasgow | Ukraine | 1–1 | 2023 World Cup qualification | 1 |
| 2 | 19 February 2022 | Pinatar Arena, San Pedro del Pinatar | Slovakia | 2–0 | 2022 Pinatar Cup | 1 |
| 3 | 6 October 2022 | Hampden Park, Glasgow | Austria | 1–0 | 2023 World Cup playoffs | 1 |

== Honours ==
Bristol City

- FA Women's Championship: 2022-23
