= Shania Hayles =

Jamaican footballer (born 1999)

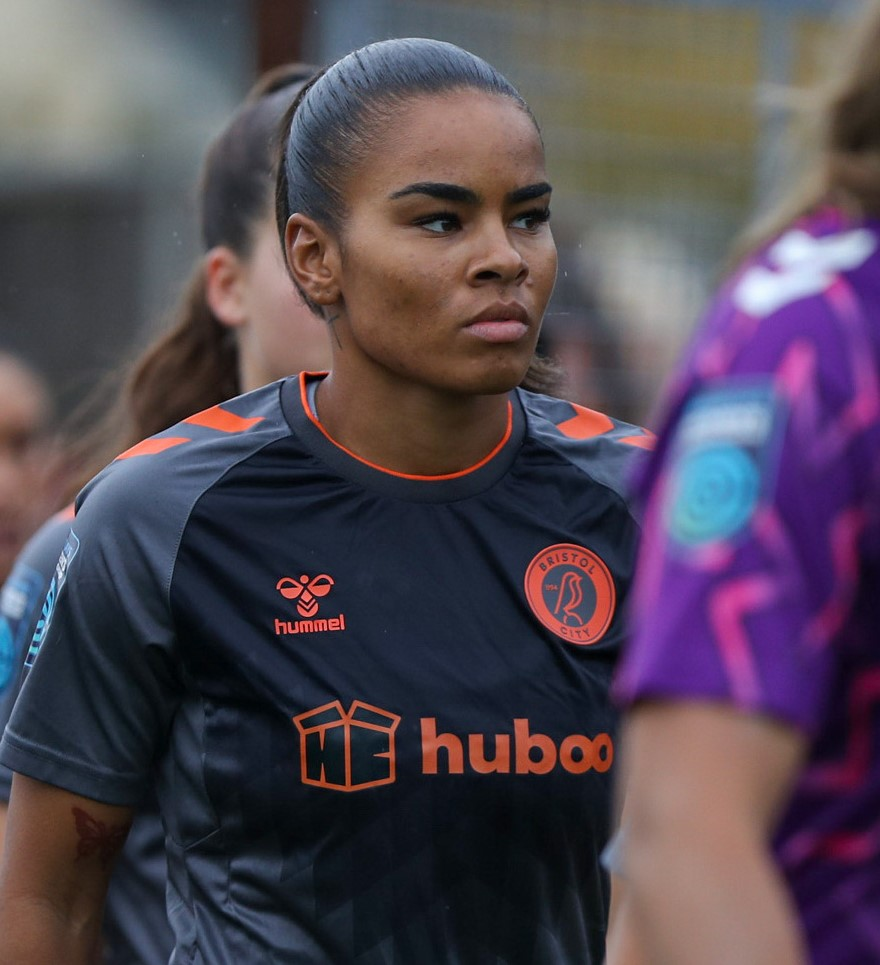
- Shania Hayles with Bristol City in 2022

Personal information
- Full name: Shania Serina Hayles
- Date of birth: 22 December 1999 (age 26)
- Place of birth: Burton upon Trent, England
- Position: Forward

Team information
- Current team: Nottingham Forest
- Number: 7

Youth career
- -2017: Aston Villa

Senior career*
Years	Team	Apps	(Gls)
2017–2019	Birmingham City	22	(0)
2019–2022	Aston Villa	44	(10)
2022–2024	Bristol City	37	(11)
2024–2026	Newcastle United	35	(17)
2026–	Nottingham Forest	1	(0)

International career^{‡}
2018	England U19	2	(1)
2021–	Jamaica	11	(4)
- * Club domestic league appearances and goals as of 15 November 2026 ‡ National team caps and goals as of 17:21, 2 October 2026 (UTC)

Shania Serina Hayles (born 22 December 1999) is a professional footballer who plays as a forward for Nottingham Forest in the Women's Super League 2. Born in England, she represents Jamaica internationally.

== Club career ==
=== Aston Villa ===
Hayles returned to Aston Villa in July 2019 from Birmingham City having started her youth career at the club.

Hayles scored two goals against Bristol City on 9 December 2020, her first goals in the top flight of English football.

=== Bristol City ===
During her time at Bristol City, Hayles scored 11 goals in a total of 37 appearances.

=== Newcastle United ===
On 3 July 2024, Hayles signed for newly promoted Women's Championship club Newcastle United.

On 22 September 2024, in the second game of the 2024–25 season, Hayles provided a goal and an assist for Newcastle's first ever Championship win in a 2–0 result over Sheffield United. A month later, she scored her first professional hat trick, from a penalty, in a 3–3 draw against Charlton Athletic.

In June 2026, Hayles departed Newcastle upon the expiration of her contract.

=== Nottingham Forest ===
On 10 August 2026, Hayles was announced at Nottingham Forest.

== International career ==
Having represented England at under-19 level in 2018, Hayles also qualifies for Jamaica through her grandparents In May 2021, she received her first call-up to Reggae Girlz, making her international debut against Nigeria on 10 June 2021.

== Career statistics ==
=== Club ===
As of match played 15 November 2026.

Appearances and goals by club, season and competition
Club	Season	League			National Cup (Note: includes the Women's FA Cup)		League Cup (Note: includes the FA Women's League Cup)		Total	
Club	Season	Division	Apps	Goals	Apps	Goals	Apps	Goals	Apps	Goals
Birmingham City	2018–19	Women's Super League	22	0	0	0	4	3	26	3
Aston Villa	2019–20	Women's Championship	12	8	1	0	6	2	19	10
Aston Villa	2020–21	Women's Super League	16	2	1	0	2	2	19	4
Aston Villa	2021–22	Women's Super League	13	0	2	0	3	1	18	1
Aston Villa	Total		41	10	4	0	11	5	56	15
Bristol City	2022–23	Women's Championship	22	11	2	1	3	0	27	12
Bristol City	2023–24	Women's Super League	15	0	0	0	4	1	19	1
Bristol City	Total		37	11	2	1	7	1	46	13
Newcastle United	2024–25	Women's Championship	19	15	2	0	2	0	23	15
Newcastle United	2025–26	Women's Super League 2	16	2	1	0	3	1	20	3
Newcastle United	Total		35	17	3	0	5	1	43	18
Nottingham Forest	2026–27	Women's Super League 2	1	0	0	0	0	0	1	0
Career total			136	38	9	1	27	10	172	49

=== International ===
As of 2 October 2026.

Appearances and goals by national team and year
National team	Year	Apps	Goals
Jamaica	2021	2	0
Jamaica	2024	3	0
Jamaica	2025	2	1
Jamaica	2026	4	2
Total		11	4

List of international goals scored by Shania Hayles
No.	Date	Venue	Opponent	Result	Competition
1	29 November 2025	Daren Sammy Cricket Ground, Gros Islet, Saint Lucia	Dominica	18–0	2026 CONCACAF W Championship qualification
2	2 March 2026	Estadio Nacional, Managua, Nicaragua	Nicaragua	3–2	2026 CONCACAF W Championship qualification
3	18 April 2026	National Stadium, Kingston, Jamaica	Guyana	2–0	2026 CONCACAF W Championship qualification
4	5 June 2026	Estadio Rommel Fernández, Panama City, Panama	Panama	1–0	Friendly

== Honours ==
Bristol City

- FA Women's Championship: 2022–23

Aston Villa

- FA Women's Championship: 2019–20

Individual

- Bristol City Women's Golden Boot Award: 2022–23
- Bristol City Women's PFA Community Champion Award: 2023–24
