= Jesse Woolley =

English footballer (born 2001)

Personal information
- Full name: Jesse Elizabeth Woolley
- Date of birth: 27 March 2001 (age 25)
- Place of birth: Bristol, England
- Position: Striker

Team information
- Current team: Portsmouth
- Number: 19

Youth career
- –2017: Bristol City

Senior career*
Years	Team	Apps	(Gls)
2017–2025	Bristol City	64	(1)
2024	→ Reading (loan)	10	(0)
2025–	Portsmouth	0	(0)

International career^{‡}
2017–2018	England U17	7	(1)
2018–19	England U18	7	(1)
- * Club domestic league appearances and goals as of 19:27, 7 December 2025 (UTC) ‡ National team caps and goals as of 18 February 2021

Jesse Elizabeth Woolley (born 27 March 2001) is an English professional footballer who plays as striker for WSL 2 club Portsmouth.

== Club career ==
Woolley began her career in the youth system at Bristol City and remained there until 2025 having made over 60 appearances for the club. She spent the latter half of the 2023-2024 season at Reading on loan. After leaving Bristol in 2025, Woolley signed with Portsmouth.

== Career statistics ==
=== Club ===
As of match played 28 April 2024

Appearances and goals by club, season and competition
Club	Season	League			FA Cup		League Cup		Total	
Club	Season	Division	Apps	Goals	Apps	Goals	Apps	Goals	Apps	Goals
Bristol City	2017–18	Women's Super League	4	0	1	0	3	0	8	0
Bristol City	2018–19	Women's Super League	4	0	1	0	4	1	9	1
Bristol City	2019–20	Women's Super League	0	0	0	0	0	0	0	0
Bristol City	2020–21	Women's Super League	1	0	0	0	0	0	1	0
Bristol City	2021–22	Championship	11	0	2	0	2	0	15	0
Bristol City	2022–23	Championship	16	1	3	1	4	0	23	2
Bristol City	2023–24	Women's Super League	1	0	0	0	3	0	4	0
Total			37	1	7	1	16	1	60	3
Reading F.C.	2023–24	Championship	10	0	1	0	0	0	11	0
Career total			46	1	8	1	16	1	71	3

== Honours ==
Bristol City

- FA Women's Championship: 2022–23
