= Amalie Thestrup =

Danish footballer (born 1995)

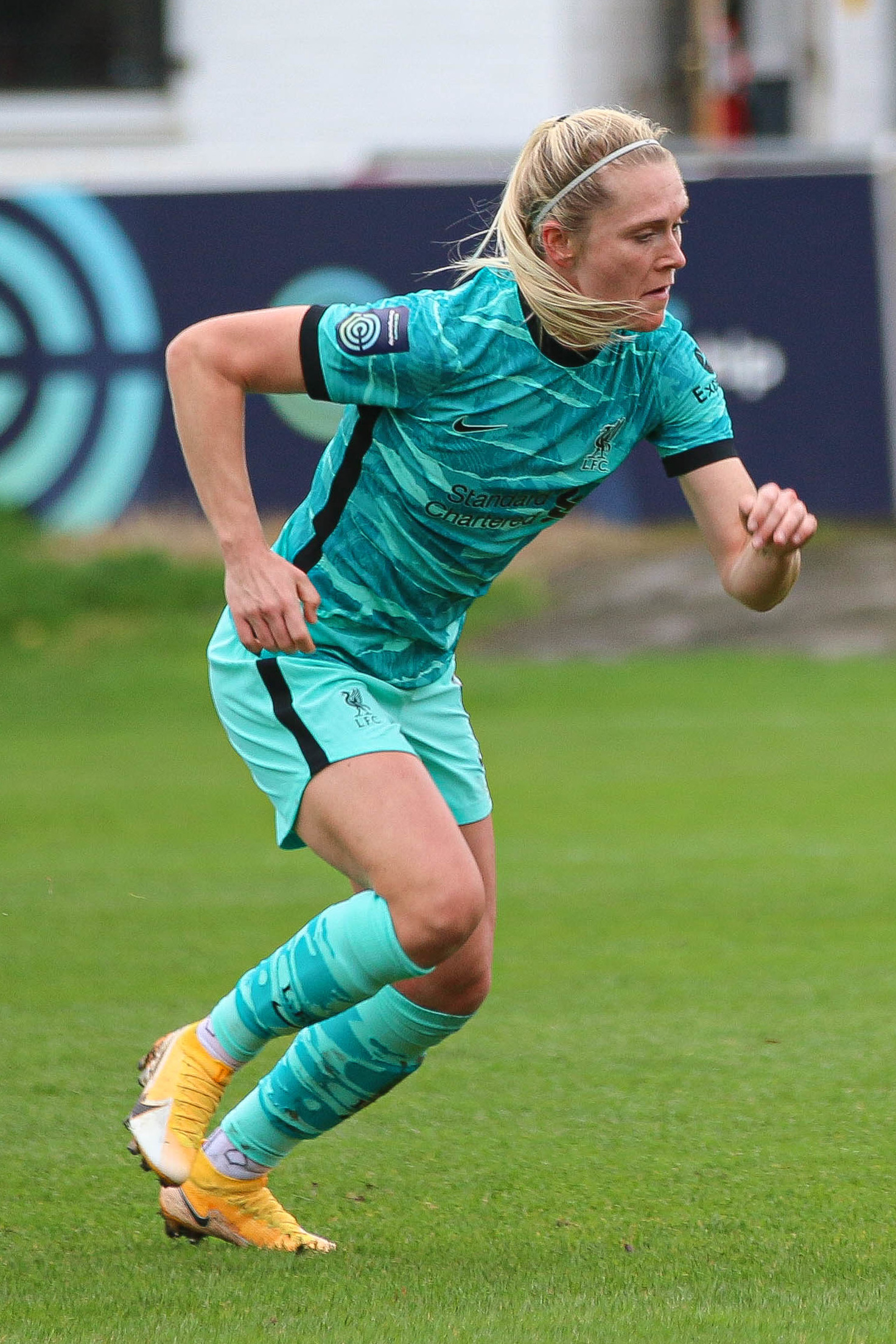
- Thestrup playing for Liverpool in 2020

Personal information
- Full name: Amalie Grønbæk Thestrup
- Date of birth: 17 March 1995 (age 31)
- Place of birth: Hellerup, Denmark
- Height: 1.71 m (5 ft 7 in)
- Position: Striker

Team information
- Current team: Brøndby IF

Youth career
- –2012: Brøndby IF
- 2012–2013: B.93

College career
| Years | Team | Apps | (Gls) |
| 2013 | Tennessee Volunteers | 16 | (1) |

Senior career*
| Years | Team | Apps | (Gls) |
| 2014–2016 | Brøndby IF | 60 | (19) |
| 2016–2017 | Vejle B | 25 | |
| 2017–2019 | BSF | 48 | (32) |
| 2019–2020 | Roma | 12 | (3) |
| 2020–2021 | Liverpool | 17 | (4) |
| 2021–2023 | PSV | 29 | (1) |
| 2023 | → West Ham United (loan) | 10 | (0) |
| 2023–2025 | Bristol City | 22 | (9) |
| 2025–2026 | Charlton Athletic | 28 | (7) |
| 2026– | Brøndby IF | 0 | (0) |

International career
| 2011 | Denmark U16 | 6 | (2) |
| 2011–2012 | Denmark U17 | 10 | (1) |
| 2012–2014 | Denmark U19 | 17 | (7) |
| 2015–2017 | Denmark U23 | 2 | (0) |
| 2019–2020 | Denmark | 4 | (0) |
- * Club domestic league appearances and goals as of 22:40, 15 June 2026 (UTC)

Amalie Grønbæk Thestrup (born 17 March 1995) is a Danish professional footballer who plays as a striker for A-Liga club Brøndby IF. She has appeared for the Denmark national team.

== Career ==
In July 2020, Thestrup signed for newly relegated Championship club Liverpool. On 25 May 2021, she left Liverpool upon the expiry of her contract, having scored only four goals in 17 league appearances.

In January 2023, she joined West Ham United on loan from PSV for the remainder of the 2022–23 WSL season.

Having joined Bristol City in August 2023, Thestrup was the top goalscorer for the club during their 2023–24 season in the Women's Super League, scoring nine times during the campaign.

Following the expiry of her contract with Bristol City, on 28 August 2025, it was announced that Thestrup had signed for Women's Super League 2 side Charlton Athletic. She scored a hat-trick in a 10–0 fourth round FA Cup win over Swindon Town on 18 January 2026.

On 26 June 2026, Thestrup was announced at Brøndby IF.

== International career ==
She has played for the Danish youth national teams, several times.

She made her senior international debut for the Danish national team, on 4 March 2019 against China, at the 2020 Algarve Cup.

== Career statistics ==
=== Club ===
As of match played 29 April 2024

Appearances and goals by club, season and competition
| Club | Season | League | | | National Cup (Note: Includes Danish Women's Cup, Coppa Italia, KNVB Women's Cup, Women's FA Cup) | | League Cup (Note: Includes Eredivisie Cup, FA Women's League Cup) | | Continental (Note: Includes UEFA Women's Champions League) | | Total | |
| Club | Season | Division | Apps | Goals | Apps | Goals | Apps | Goals | Apps | Goals | Apps | Goals |
|---|---|---|---|---|---|---|---|---|---|---|---|---|
| BSF | 2017–18 | Kvindeligaen | 24 | 15 | ? | ? | — | | — | | 24 | 15 |
| BSF | 2018–19 | Kvindeligaen | 24 | 17 | ? | ? | — | | — | | 24 | 17 |
| BSF | Total | | 48 | 32 | ? | ? | — | | — | | 48 | 32 |
| AS Roma | 2019–20 | Serie A | 12 | 3 | 3 | 2 | — | | — | | 15 | 5 |
| Liverpool | 2020–21 | Championship | 17 | 4 | 1 | 0 | 3 | 0 | — | | 21 | 4 |
| PSV | 2021–22 | Eredivisie | 20 | 1 | 4 | 2 | 2 | 0 | 2 | 1 | 28 | 4 |
| PSV | 2022–23 | Eredivisie | 9 | 0 | 0 | 0 | 0 | 0 | — | | 9 | 0 |
| PSV | Total | | 29 | 1 | 4 | 2 | 2 | 0 | 2 | 1 | 37 | 4 |
| West Ham United (loan) | 2022–23 | Women's Super League | 10 | 0 | 1 | 0 | 1 | 0 | — | | 12 | 0 |
| Bristol City | 2023–24 | Women's Super League | 22 | 9 | 1 | 0 | 3 | 0 | — | | 26 | 9 |
| Career total | | | 138 | 49 | 10 | 4 | 9 | 0 | 2 | 1 | 159 | 54 |

=== International ===
As of match played 10 March 2020

Appearances and goals by national team and year
| National team | Year | Apps | Goal |
|---|---|---|---|
| Denmark | 2019 | 2 | 0 |
| Denmark | 2020 | 2 | 0 |
| Total | | 4 | 0 |

== Honours ==
Brøndby IF

- Elitedivisionen: 2015, 2017
- Elitedivisionen runners-up: 2016
- Danish Cup: 2015, 2017
