= Chloe Bull =

Welsh footballer (born 1994)

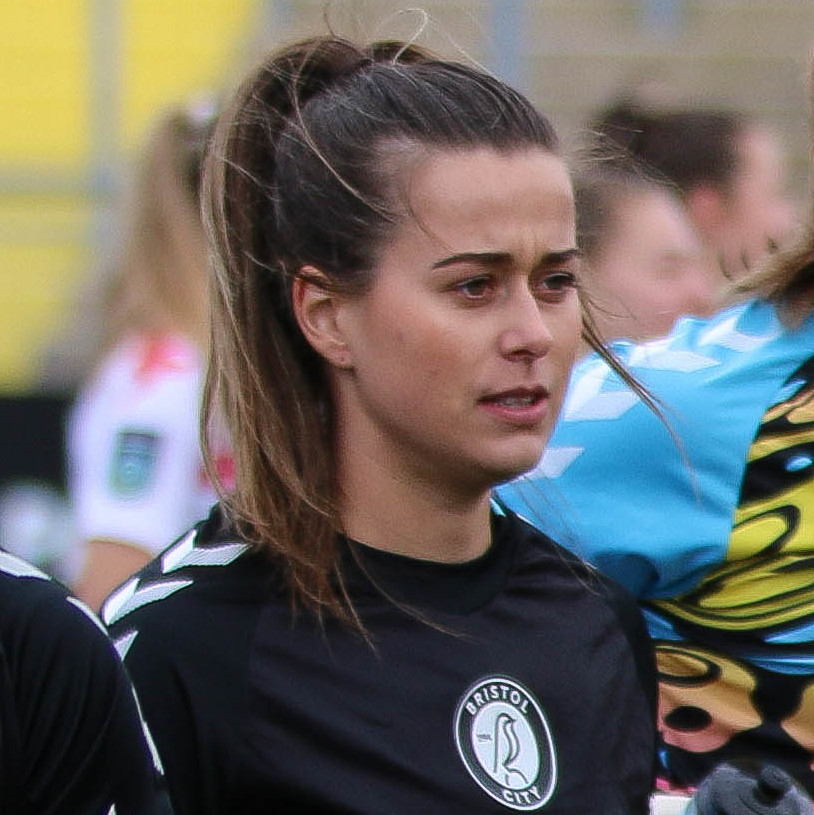
- Bull in 2022

Personal information
- Full name: Chloe Bull O'Connor
- Date of birth: 13 December 1994 (age 31)
- Place of birth: Wales
- Position: Midfielder

Team information
- Current team: Swansea City
- Number: 7

Youth career
- Swansea City

Senior career*
Years	Team	Apps	(Gls)
- Swansea City
2020–2021	Cardiff Met	15	(14)
2021–2023	Bristol City	40	(9)
2023–	Swansea City		

International career
2016–	Wales	1	(0)
- * Club domestic league appearances and goals as of 20 April 2023

Chloe Bull O'Connor (born 13 December 1994) is a Welsh footballer who plays as a midfielder for Swansea City.

== Career ==
At the age of 15, Bull debuted for Welsh side Swansea City. In 2021, she signed for Bristol City in England.

== Honours ==
Bristol City

- FA Women's Championship: 2022–23
