= Ffion Morgan =

Welsh footballer (born 2000)

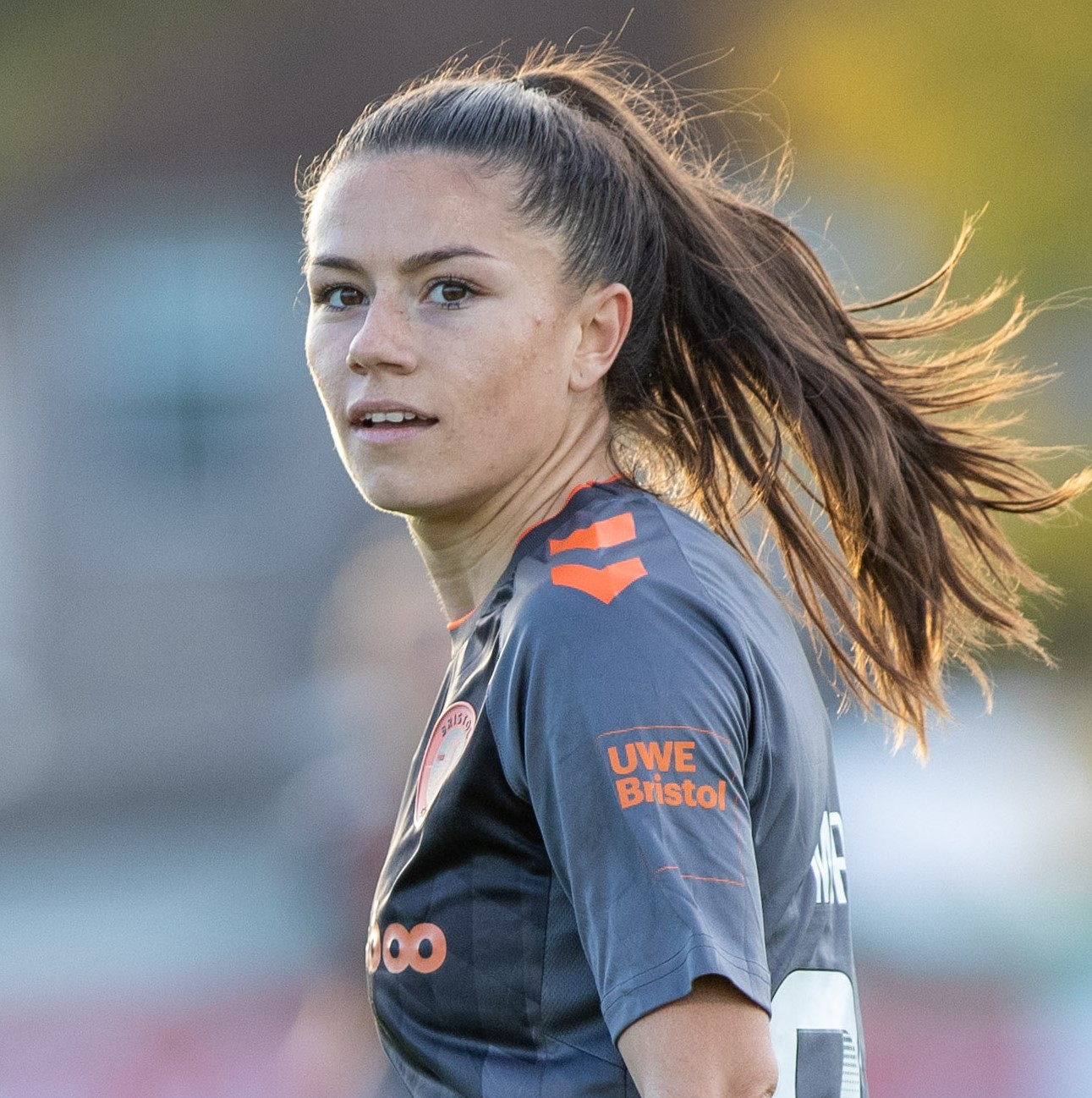
- Morgan with Bristol City in 2022.

Personal information
- Full name: Ffion Alys Morgan
- Date of birth: 11 May 2000 (age 26)
- Place of birth: Llandeilo, Wales
- Height: 1.57 m (5 ft 2 in)
- Positions: Full-back; forward

Team information
- Current team: West Ham United
- Number: 23

Youth career
- 2004–2010: Saron Juniors
- 2010–2014: Ammanford
- 2015–2018: Bristol City

Senior career*
Years	Team	Apps	(Gls)
2018–2019	Cardiff City	19	(1)
2019–2020	Coventry United	11	(0)
2020–2021	Crystal Palace	17	(0)
2021–2025	Bristol City	77	(15)
2025–	West Ham United	18	(1)

International career^{‡}
2016–2017	Wales U17	6	(2)
2018–2019	Wales U19	3	(1)
2017–	Wales	54	(2)
- * Club domestic league appearances and goals as of 11:53, 27 May 2026 (UTC) ‡ National team caps and goals as of 11:53, 27 May 2026 (UTC)

Ffion Alys Morgan (Welsh: [ˈfiːɔn ˈalɪs ˈmɔrɡan]; born 11 May 2000) is a Welsh professional footballer who plays as a forward for Women's Super League (WSL) club West Ham United and the Wales national team. She began her career with Cardiff City Ladies, before joining Coventry United in 2019, moving to Crystal Palace in 2020 and then to Bristol City in 2021. Ffion has played for Wales from the age of 14 (youth) and made her international senior debut in 2017.

== Early life ==
Morgan is from Llandeilo in Carmarthenshire. She attended Llandybie Primary School and then Ysgol Tre-Gib in Llandeilo as a teenager. At the age of 16, she moved away from home to complete her education at the FAW academy in Ystrad Mynach.

== Club career ==
Morgan began playing football from the age of four for local boys side Saron Juniors. At the age of 11, she joined Ammanford Girls. Morgan later signed for Cardiff City but missed the 2017–18 campaign after suffering a serious anterior cruciate ligament (ACL) injury while on international duty for Wales under-19s.

In September 2019, Morgan joined FA Women's Championship side Coventry United. In July 2020, she signed for Crystal Palace.

In 2021, Morgan signed for Bristol City, helping them achieve promotion to the WSL in 2023. Morgan won the Bristol Supporters' Player of the Year award at the end of the 2024-25 season. On 20 June 2025 after 89 appearances and 15 goals, it was announced that Morgan was departing the club upon the expiry of her contract at the end of June 2025.

In July 2025, Morgan signed for West Ham United.

== International career ==
Morgan has 41 Junior caps across under 15’s, 16’s 18’s and captained under 19’s. She has been capped for the Wales national team, appearing for the team during the 2019 FIFA Women's World Cup qualifying cycle. She made her debut for the senior squad against Northern Ireland in 2017 before suffering an ACL injury while playing later that year for WU19s. As of December 2025, Morgan has reached the milestone of 50 caps for Cymru.

In June 2025, Morgan was named in Wales' squad for UEFA Women's Euro 2025. She scored two goals in the lead up to the team's qualification, including against Slovakia in the first leg of the play-off semi-final. Ffion featured in all 3 Euro games, being called off the bench against Netherlands and then as number 9 in the starting 11 against France and England.

== Personal life ==
Morgan is bilingual, speaking both Welsh and English. Alongside playing football, she also holds a UEFA B Licence in coaching.

Morgan is in a relationship with Newcastle United player Lia Cataldo.

Morgan has openly spoken about being a lesbian and has advocated for LGBTQIA+ representation in women’s football. She has said that she “never felt the need to come out”, instead openly sharing her personal life and relationships on social media.

== Social Media Career ==
Ffion Morgan has maintained an active online presence alongside her football career, building a substantial following across social media platforms through her sporting profile and online content.

Morgan began appearing on the family YouTube channel The Morgans, which became especially active during the coronavirus pandemic and featured weekly family vlogs alongside her sisters, Carys Harding, now a lifestyle and parenting content creator, and Sara Morgan, a medical student, as well as their parents, Phylip and Ruth Morgan, who both work in business technology The channel was later discontinued after reaching around 2,150 subscribers, as the family no longer saw each other as frequently and each member pursued their own individual channels.

Morgan now focuses on vlog-style content on her personal YouTube channel, where she shares content surrounding her football career, team, family life and personal experiences; her channel currently has around 54,700 subscribers.

On Instagram, where she has over 291,000 followers, Morgan is particularly known for her “Day in the Life of a Footballer” reel series.

== Career statistics ==
=== Club ===
As of match played 16 May 2026

Appearances and goals by club, season and competition
Club	Season	League			FA Cup		League Cup (Note: includes Women's League Cup)		Total	
Club	Season	Division	Apps	Goals	Apps	Goals	Apps	Goals	Apps	Goals
Cardiff City Ladies	2016–17	Women's National League	1	0	0	0	1	0	2	0
Cardiff City Ladies	2018–19	Women's National League	16	1	2	0	1	0	19	1
Cardiff City Ladies	Total		17	1	2	0	2	0	21	1
Coventry United	2019–20	Women's Championship	11	0	2	0	4	0	17	0
Crystal Palace	2020–21	Women's Championship	17	0	2	0	3	0	22	0
Bristol City	2021–22	Women's Championship	17	3	2	1	3	0	22	4
Bristol City	2022–23	Women's Championship	20	5	2	0	1	0	23	5
Bristol City	2023–24	Women's Super League	22	1	1	0	1	0	24	1
Bristol City	2024–25	Women's Championship	18	6	1	0	1	0	20	6
Bristol City	Total		77	15	6	1	6	0	89	16
West Ham United	2025–26	Women's Super League	18	1	2	0	4	2	24	3
Career total			140	17	14	1	19	2	173	20

=== International ===
As of matches played 18 April 2026

Appearances and goals by national team and year
National team	Year	Apps	Goals
Wales	2017	3	0
Wales	2018	3	0
Wales	2019	2	0
Wales	2020	2	0
Wales	2021	2	0
Wales	2022	10	0
Wales	2023	9	0
Wales	2024	8	2
Wales	2025	11	0
Wales	2026	4	0
Total		54	2

Scores and results list Wales's goal tally first, score column indicates score after each Morgan goal.

List of international goals scored by Ffion Morgan
No.	Date	Venue	Opponent	Score	Result	Competition
1.	9 April 2024	Zahir Pajaziti Stadium, Podujevo, Kosovo	Kosovo	0–4	0–6	UEFA Women's Euro 2025 qualifying
2.	25 October 2024	NTC Poprad, Poprad, Slovakia	Slovakia	2–1	2–1	UEFA Women's Euro 2025 qualifying

== Honours ==
Bristol City

- FA Women's Championship: 2022-23
