= Sille Struck =

Danish footballer (born 1998)

Personal information
- Full name: Cecilie Maag Struck
- Date of birth: 16 December 1998 (age 27)
- Place of birth: Viborg, Denmark
- Position: Midfielder

Team information
- Current team: Bristol City
- Number: 3

Youth career
- 2014–2015: Team Viborg

Senior career*
Years	Team	Apps	(Gls)
–2017	IK Skovbakken		
2017–2018	Odense Q		
2018–2019	VSK Aarhus		
2019	Odense Q		
2019–2020	FC Thy-Thisted Q	12	
2020–2022	Rayo Vallecano	40	(2)
2022–2023	Levante Las Planas	26	(0)
2023–	Bristol City	13	(0)

International career
2013–2014	Denmark U16	10	(1)
2014–2015	Denmark U17	5	(1)
2015	Denmark U19	3	(0)
- * Club domestic league appearances and goals as of 24 March 2024

Cecilie Maag Struck (born 16 December 1998) is a Danish professional footballer who plays as a midfielder for English Women's Super League club Bristol City.

== Club career ==
=== Odense Q (2017–2019) ===
Struck transferred from VSK Aarhus to Odense Q of the Danish Women's League on 10 August 2017. She debuted on 23 August 2017 against Fortuna Hjørring, in which she scored her first goal for Odense Q.

=== FC Thy-Thisted Q (2019–2020) ===
Struck played for FC Thy-Thisted Q in the Danish Women's Cup final in July 2020, which her team lost to FC Nordsjælland 1–0.

=== Rayo Vallecano (2020–2022) ===
Struck's transfer to Liga F club Rayo Vallecano in October 2020 was the first paid international transfer of a female player in the history of FC Thy-Thisted Q. She signed a one-year contract with the club.

=== Levante Las Planas (2022–2023) ===
Struck signed with Liga F club Levante Las Planas on 9 September 2022.

=== Bristol City (2023–present) ===
On 13 September 2023, Struck signed for newly promoted English Women's Super League side Bristol City. On 10 July 2025, it was announced that Struck had signed a two-year contract to extend her time with the club.

== International career ==
Struck has played for the Denmark women's national under-16, under-17, and under-19 teams.
