= Bristol City W.F.C. =

English women's association football team

Bristol City Women
- Full name: Bristol City Women's Football Club
- Nickname: The Robins (formerly The Vixens)
- Founded: 1998; 28 years ago as Bristol Rovers
- Ground: Ashton Gate, Bristol
- Capacity: 26,462
- Coordinates: 51°26′24″N 2°37′13″W
- Chairman: Gavin Marshall
- Manager: Charlotte Healy
- League: Women's Super League 2
- 2025–26: WSL 2, 4th of 12
- Website: bristolcitywomenfc.com
Home colours	Away colours	Third colours

Bristol City Women's Football Club is a women's association football team from the city of Bristol. Formed in 1998 as Bristol Rovers W.F.C., they were renamed Bristol Academy W.F.C. in 2005 following the withdraw of support from Bristol Rovers and increased involvement and academy development from Bristol Academy of Sport (now SGS Sport), part of South Gloucestershire and Stroud College. A second change of name, this time to Bristol City was approved by the FA Women's Football Board in time for the 2016 WSL season. With their home games relocating from SGS College's Stoke Gifford Stadium to the Robins High Performance Centre and now Ashton Gate Stadium. Bristol City Women won promotion to the FA Women's Super League (WSL), the highest level of the women's game in England in 2016 and stayed there for five seasons before being relegated to the FA Women's Championship in 2021.

== History ==
=== Early years ===
The team was founded in 1998, following a merger between the Bristol Rovers girls' teams and Welsh side Cable-Tel L.F.C.. This merger came about as Bristol Rovers only had girls teams up to the under 16 age group level, so when girls reached the age of 16 they were forced to leave the club. The merger with Cable-Tel meant that Bristol Rovers had a senior squad, and more importantly it gave them a place in the South West Combination league, only two levels below the top flight of women's football in England. This new merged team took the name Bristol Rovers W.F.C. and played their home games at The Beeches, the training ground and administrative offices of Bristol Rovers, located in Brislington.

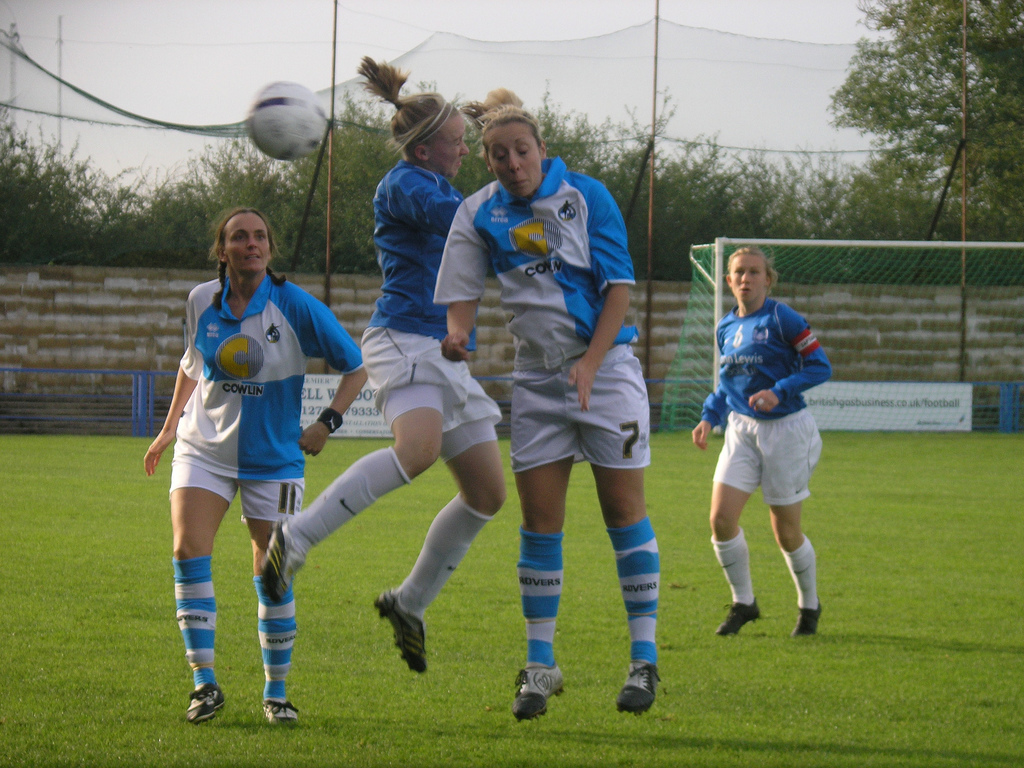
Bristol Academy playing Birmingham City in 2006

The team, like their male counterparts at Bristol Rovers, were somewhat nomadic in their early days, having played home matches at The Beeches, Lodge Road (home of Yate Town), Cossham Street (Mangotsfield United), the Memorial Stadium (Bristol Rovers), Fry's Sports Ground in Keynsham, The Lawns (Cribbs F.C.), The Hand Stadium (Clevedon Town), Lakeview (Bishop Sutton), and Oaklands Park (Almondsbury Town). They finally acquired their own purpose-built home ground, Stoke Gifford Stadium, on land owned by Filton College (now South Gloucestershire and Stroud College) in time for the inaugural FA WSL season in 2011. Since then, all of their home games were played there up until the end of the 2019–20 season, with the exception of UEFA Women's Champions League matches, which have been held at Ashton Gate.

The name of the club was changed to Bristol Academy at the beginning of the 2005–06 season to reflect the increased involvement of the Bristol Academy of Sport with the club. The team continued to play in the blue and white quarters of Bristol Rovers however, and also retained the nickname The Gas Girls, an acknowledgement of Rovers' unofficial nickname of The Gas. Bristol Rovers, now in the bottom division of The Football League, found themselves unable to continue financing a women's team in 2006 and withdrew funding. Bristol Academy of Sport agreed to bankroll the team for 12 months, but there were serious doubts during the 2006–07 season that the club would survive beyond the summer.

In summer 2009 the club had a funding crisis. Manager Gary Green was sacked, Corinne Yorston left for Arsenal, Stef Curtis for Chelsea and Gwennan Harries for Everton. Without their star players the team finished bottom of the table in 2009–10.

The club were one of eight founding teams in the FA WSL in April 2011, when they moved into a brand new stadium at South Gloucestershire and Stroud College's Stoke Gifford Campus.

In 2013 the club signed a sponsorship agreement with Bristol City FC and changed their home kit from blue to red, and three years later the club was renamed Bristol City Women's Football Club.

In July 2018, the club named Tanya Oxtoby its new manager, moving into the position from being an assistant with Birmingham City W.F.C.

In June 2025, Bristol City appointed Charlotte Healy as head coach of the women's team.

On 18 September 2025, it was announced that a majority stake in the ownership of the club had been acquired by the multi-club ownership group Mercury13.

=== League history ===
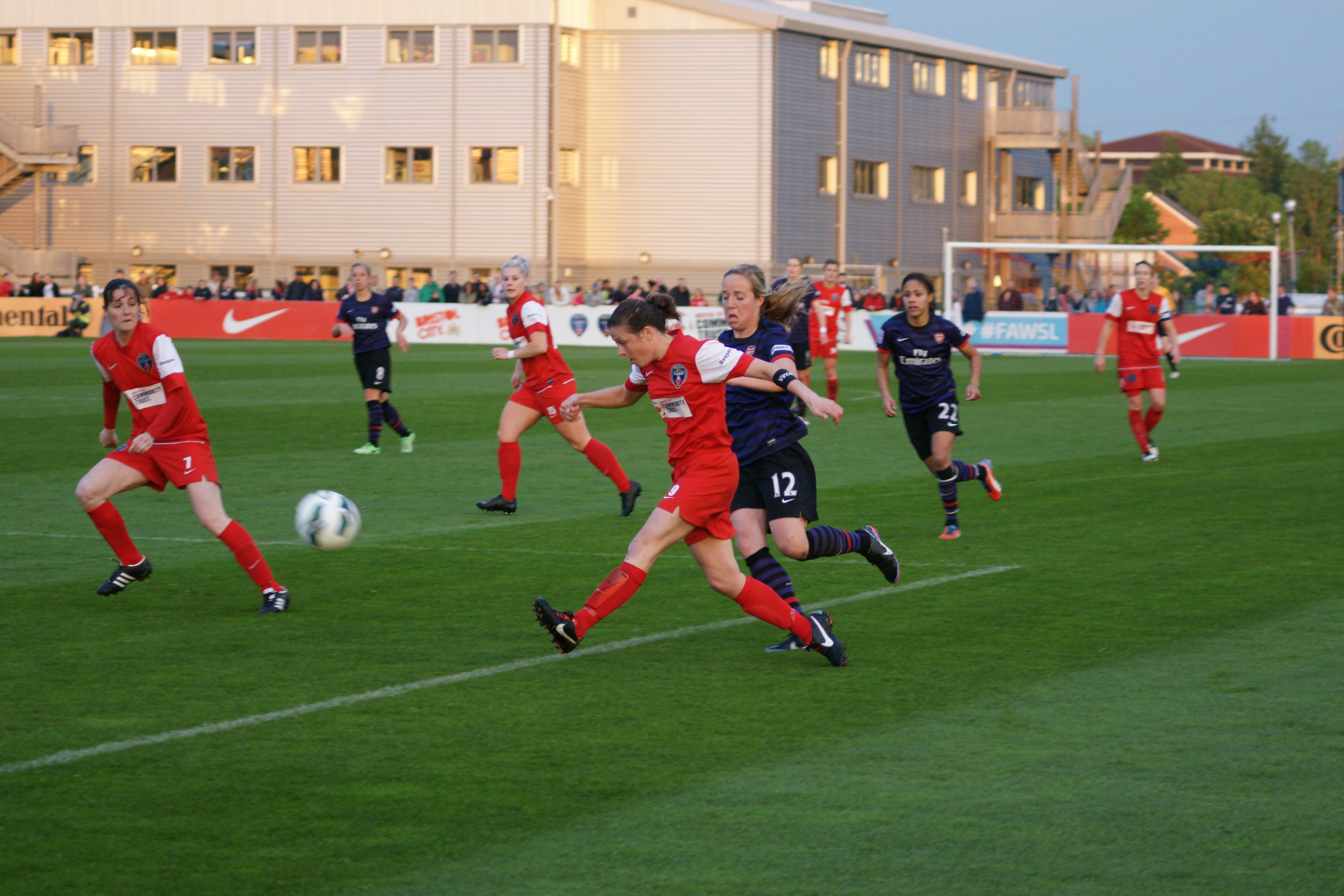
Bristol Academy at home to Arsenal Ladies, May 2013

It took just two seasons to gain promotion to the FA Women's Premier League Southern Division, when the club won the South West Combination in the 2000–01 season under the management of Dave Bell. After this Dave Bell left the club to join the academy set-up at Manchester United, and was replaced by Tony Ricketts.

Tony Ricketts also achieved league success, with the team winning the Southern Division in the 2002–03 season and earning promotion to the FA Women's Premier League National Division. The first season in the top-flight was a struggle, with the team narrowly avoiding relegation. However Bristol Academy established themselves in the National Division with two fifth-place finishes over the next two seasons.

In the 2006–2007 season, the club reached the top spot in November (though defending champions Arsenal L.F.C. had games in hand due to European Cup, League Cup and FA Cup commitments). Arsenal played their games in hand Bristol Academy, hovered between the 4th and 8th places.

Bristol City Women finished 2nd in FA WSL 2 for the 2016 season and won promotion to FA WSL 1 for their 2017 campaign.

They were relegated in the 2020–21 season to the FA Women's Championship where they finished third in their first season back in the second tier.

The 2022–23 season saw Bristol City win their first ever league title and, with it, promotion back to the WSL.

=== Cup history ===
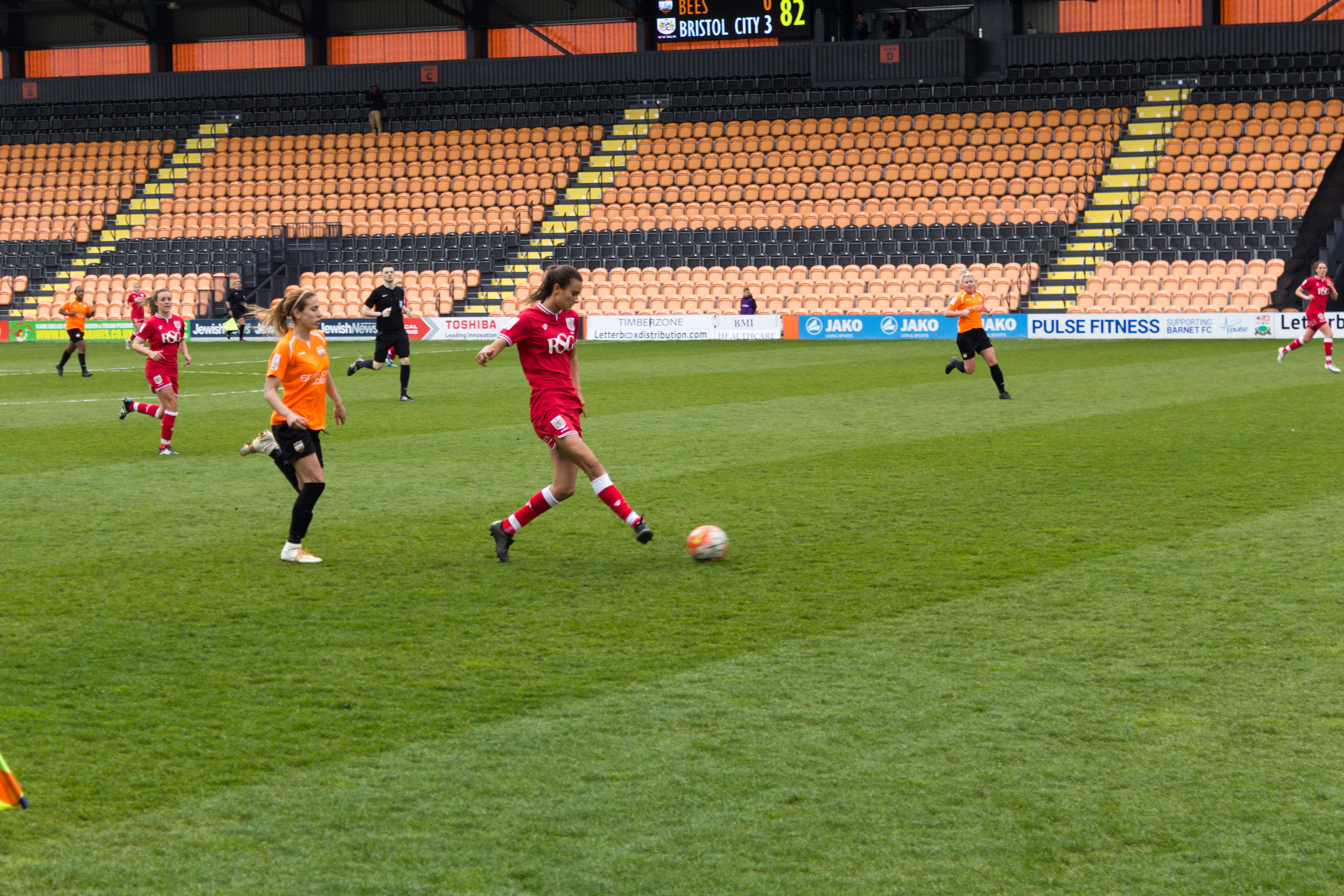
Bristol City away against London Bees, April 2016

In the short history of the team they have reached the semi-final of the FA Women's Cup five times. The first was in the 2000–01 season when they were still playing their league football in the South West Combination, playing in front of a club record crowd of over 3000 at the Memorial Stadium against Arsenal L.F.C. The match ended in a 3–0 defeat. Three more unsuccessful semi-final matches were to follow in this competition, against Fulham L.F.C. in 2002–03, Charlton Athletic L.F.C. in the 2004–05 season and Arsenal again providing the opposition in 2006–07.

In 2011 the club reached the final of the FA Cup after a 3–0 semi-final win over Liverpool. Bristol were beaten 2–0 by Arsenal in the final, before 13,885 fans at the Ricoh Arena in Coventry. In 2013 the club reached its second FA Cup final after a 2–0 semi-final win over Lincoln Ladies. Bristol were again beaten by Arsenal 3–0 in the final at the Keepmoat Stadium in Doncaster.

The team dominated the Gloucestershire FA Women's Challenge Cup in their early days, winning the trophy eight times in their first nine seasons. The only failure to win the competition came in the 2003–04 season when they were beaten in the final by the original Bristol City W.F.C., their first ever defeat to their cross-city rivals. Following the 2006–07 win the first team stopped competing in the tournament, although their junior teams continued taking part.

They did reach the final of the Continental Tyres League Cup Final in the 2020–21 season but were defeated by Chelsea FC.

=== UEFA competitions ===
- For a detailed international record see English women's football clubs in international competitions

Because of the new WSL, England's UEFA Women's Champions League places were allocated to the FA Cup finalists as a one time exception. Thus Bristol won a place in the 2011–12 UEFA Women's Champions League round of 32. They started in the round of 32 and were drawn against Russian side Energiya Voronezh and drew their home game 1–1 but lost the return leg in Russia 2–4 and didn't advance.

=== Season by season ===
Season	League	Position	FA Cup	League Cup^{A}	Other	Manager
Bristol Rovers W.F.C.
1998–99	South West Combination	2nd			Gloucestershire Cup winners	Billy Gornicki-Bond
1999–00	South West Combination	2nd	Third round		Gloucestershire Cup winners	Billy Gornicki-Bond
2000–01	South West Combination	1st (promoted)	Semi-final		Gloucestershire Cup winners	Dave Bell
2001–02	Premier League Southern Division	2nd of 12	Fourth round	First round	Gloucestershire Cup winners	Tony Ricketts
2002–03	Premier League Southern Division	1st of 11 (promoted)	Semi-final	Quarter-final	Gloucestershire Cup winners	Tony Ricketts
2003–04	Premier League National Division	8th of 10	Semi-final	Semi-final		Tony Ricketts; Ivor Gumm
2004–05	Premier League National Division	5th of 10	Semi-final	Quarter-final	Gloucestershire Cup winners	Gary Green
Bristol Academy W.F.C.
2005–06	Premier League National Division	5th of 10	Quarter-final	Quarter-final	Gloucestershire Cup winners	Gary Green
2006–07	Premier League National Division	4th of 12	Semi-final	Second round	Gloucestershire Cup winners	Gary Green
2007–08	Premier League National Division	4th of 12	Fourth round	Third round		Gary Green
2008–09	Premier League National Division	8th of 12	Quarter-final	Second round		Gary Green
2009–10	Premier League National Division	12th of 12	Fourth round	Quarter-final	Granted WSL licence	Mark Sampson
2011	Women's Super League	5th of 8	Runners-up	First round	2011–12 Champions League: First round	Mark Sampson
2012	Women's Super League	4th of 8	Semi-final	Semi-final		Mark Sampson
2013	Women's Super League	2nd of 8	Runners-up	Group stage		Mark Sampson
2014	Women's Super League	7th of 8	Fifth round	Group stage	2014–15 Champions League: Quarter-final	Dave Edmondson
2015	Women's Super League	8th of 8 (relegated)	Fifth round	Quarter-final		Dave Edmondson; Lauren Smith; Willie Kirk
Bristol City W.F.C.
2016	WSL 2	2nd of 10 (promoted)	Fourth round	First round		Willie Kirk
2017	Women's Super League	8th of 9	Quarter-final	N/A^{B}		Willie Kirk
2017–18	Women's Super League	8th of 10	Fourth round	Quarter-final		Willie Kirk
2018–19	Women's Super League	6th of 11	Fifth round	Group stage		Tanya Oxtoby
2019–20	Women's Super League	10th of 12	Fifth round	Group stage		Tanya Oxtoby
2020–21	Women's Super League	12th of 12 (relegated)	Fourth round	Runners-up		Tanya Oxtoby; Matt Beard
2021–22	Women's Championship	3rd of 12	Fourth round	Quarter-final		Lauren Smith
2022–23	Women's Championship	1st of 12 (promoted)	Fifth round	Quarter-final		Lauren Smith
2023–24	Women's Super League	12th of 12 (relegated)	Fourth round	Group stage		Lauren Smith
2024–25	Women's Championship	6th of 11	Fourth round	Group stage		Lauren Smith; Loren Dykes; Stephen Kirby

^ALeague cup column shows results in the FA Women's Premier League Cup (2001–2010) and the FA WSL Cup (2011–present)
^BThere was no WSL Cup tournament during the 2017 WSL Spring Series

== Stadium ==
Ashton Gate shown within Bristol and the UK

After having played at a number of different grounds, the team finally got their own home in 2011 when they moved into the newly built Stoke Gifford Stadium at South Gloucestershire and Stroud College, WISE Campus in North Bristol. It was the first stadium in the UK to be developed specifically for a women's football team. They stayed here until the end of the 2019–20 season. After this league requirements saw a move to Twerton Park and a groundshare with Bath City FC. The robins only stayed here for one season before they relocated to the Robins High Performance Centre for the start 2021–22 season.

The club record attendance came in April 2023 when 7,045 spectators watched Bristol City against Charlton Athletic in the FA Women's Championship at Ashton Gate.

The club announced that all home matches would be played at Ashton Gate for the upcoming season.

== Players ==
=== Current squad ===
As of 4 October 2026

Note: Flags indicate national team as defined under FIFA eligibility rules; some limited exceptions apply. Players may hold more than one non-FIFA nationality.

No.	Pos.	Nation	Player
1	GK	ENG	Fran Bentley
2	DF	WAL	Ella Powell
3	DF	ENG	Gemma Lawley
4	DF	DEN	Sille Struck
5	MF	WAL	Sophie Ingle
6	FW	IRL	Lia O'Leary
7	FW	ENG	Katie Robinson
9	FW	ENG	Rio Hardy
10	FW	FIN	Lotta Lindström
12	DF	AUS	Alexia Apostolakis
14	MF	ENG	Emma Bissell
15	DF	POL	Oliwia Woś
16	MF	ENG	Emily Syme (captain)

No.	Pos.	Nation	Player
17	GK	ENG	Hope McSheffrey
18	MF	TAN	Malaika Meena
19	FW	MLT	Maria Farrugia
20	DF	WAL	Esther Morgan
21	MF	ALG	Marine Dafeur
22	GK	HUN	Lauren Brzykcy
23	DF	ENG	Brooke Aspin
24	MF	SCO	Eilidh Shore
26	FW	ENG	Maddie Durrant
44	DF	ENG	Isla Law
45	MF	ENG	Issi Hebard
—	DF	DEN	Signe Markvardsen
—	DF	SCO	Neeve McDonald

==== Out on loan ====
Note: Flags indicate national team as defined under FIFA eligibility rules; some limited exceptions apply. Players may hold more than one non-FIFA nationality.

No.	Pos.	Nation	Player
8	MF	ESP	Vicky Losada (at Badalona until 30 June 2027)

== Management ==
=== Coaching ===
Position	Staff Member
Head Coach	(England) Charlotte Healy
Assistant Coach	(Greece) Pascal Xanthos
Assistant Coach	(England) Paul Temple
Head of Goalkeeping	(Wales) Matt James
MEDICAL STAFF
Sports Therapist	(England) Megan Hattemore

=== Club ===
As of September 2026

Position	Name
Owner	Mercury13
Chief Executive Officer	(England) Hannah Buckley
Chairman	(United States) Lauren Holiday
Sporting Director	(Netherlands) Mary Willemsen
Head of Recruitment	(England) Michelle Yeowell
Sports Scientist	(England) Molly Sadler

=== Academy ===
Position	Staff Member
U21s Head Coach	(England) Kerri Coombs
U21s Assistant Coach	(Wales) Jess Walkley
Academy Manager	(England) Abbie Sadler

=== Managers ===
As of 4 April 2026

Name	Tenure	Ref.
(Wales) Mandy Gornicki-Bond	1998 – 2000	
Bell	2000 – 2001	
(Wales) Tony Ricketts	2001 – 2003	
(England) Ivor Gumm	2003 – 2004	
Gary Green	2004 – 2009	
(Wales) Mark Sampson	2009 – 2013	
Dave Edmondson	2014 – 2015	
(Wales) Lauren Smith (caretaker)	2015	
(Scotland) Willie Kirk	April 2015 – 1 December 2018	
(Australia) Tanya Oxtoby	4 July 2018 – 16 August 2021	
(England) Matt Beard (interim)	15 January 2021 – 2021	(Note: Beard took over whilst Oxtoby was on maternity leave.)
(Wales) Lauren Smith	2021 – 27 August 2024	
(Wales) Loren Dykes (interim)	27 August 2024 – 19 September 2024	
(England) Steve Kirby	19 September 2024 – 13 May 2025	
(England) Charlotte Healey	24 June 2025 –	

== Team honours ==
- FA Women's Championship: 1

2022–23

- FA Women's Premier League Southern Division: 1

2002–03

- South West Combination Women's Football League: 1

2000–01

- Gloucestershire FA Women's Challenge Cup: 8

1998–99, 1999–2000, 2000–01, 2001–02, 2002–03, 2004–05, 2005–06, 2006–07

== Club records ==
Highest league finish position: 2nd in Women's Super League 2013 as Bristol Academy W.F.C

Lowest league position: 6th in FA Women's Championship 2024–25

Highest points total in a season – 48 (2022–23 FA Women's Championship)

Lowest points total in a season – 6 (2023–24) Women's Super League)

Most league wins in a season – 15 (2022–23 FA Women's Championship)

Fewest league wins in a season – 1 (2023–24 Women's Super League)

Most league defeats in a season – 18 (2023–24 Women's Super League)

Fewest league defeats in a season – 4 (2022–23 FA Women's Championship)

Most league draws in a season – 6 (2024–25 FA Women's Championship)

Fewest league draws in a season – 1 (2017–18 Women's Super League)

Most league goals scored in a season – 43 (2021–22 FA Women's Championship)

Fewest league goals scored in a season – 9 (2019–20 Women's Super League) * Season cut short due to COVID-19 Pandemic

Most league goals conceded in a season – 72 (2020–21 Women's Super League)

Fewest league goals conceded in a season – 12 (2022–23 FA Women's Championship)

Biggest win – 7–0 vs Ipswich Town F.C. Women, FA Women's Championship, 9 November 2025

Biggest defeat – Arsenal Women 11–1 Bristol City Women, 1 December 2019

Highest scoring match – Arsenal Women 11–1 Bristol City Women, 1 December 2019

Highest transfer fee paid – £400,000 (Katie Robinson from Aston Villa W.F.C., January 2026)

Highest transfer fee received – £100,000 (Naomi Layzell to Manchester City W.F.C. June 2024)

Most goals in a season by a player – Abi Harrison, 21 (2021–22 FA Women's Championship)

Youngest player – 16 years and 44 days, Lauren Hemp (vs Watford F.C. Women, WSL 2, 10 September 2016)

Oldest player – 35 years and 352 days, Rachel Furness (vs Manchester City.F.C.. Women's Super League, 28 April 2024)

Fastest goal – Chloe Bull, 38 seconds (vs Crystal Palace F.C, FA Women's Championship, 5 February 2022)

Most goals by a player in a match – 2, Grace Clinton (vs Crystal Palace F.C, FA Women's Championship, 5 March 2023)

Youngest goalscorer – 16 years and 44 days, Lauren Hemp (vs Watford F.C. Women, WSL 2, 10 September 2016)

Oldest goalscorer – 35 years and 139 days, Rachel Furness (vs Arsenal F.C. Women's Super League, 22 October 2023)

Most league matches won in a row – 5 (8 February 2023 to 12 March 2023)

Most league matches lost in a row – 9 (18 February 2024 to 18 May 2024)

Most matches without a win (all competitions) – 23 (12 November 2023 to 6 October 2024)

Most home matches without a win – 17 (1 October 2023 to 13 October 2024)

Most away matches without a win – 16 (13 September 2020 to 21 November 2021)

Most league matches without defeat – 8 (2 December 2022 to 19 March 2023)

Most home league matches without defeat – 6 (17 November 2018 to 24 March 2019)

Most away league matches without defeat – 8 (1 May 2022 to 19 March 2023)

Most league matches without conceding a goal – 4 (12 February 2023 to 12 March 2023)

Most league matches without scoring a goal – 7 (17 March 2024 to 18 May 2024)

Most matches without a clean sheet – 29 (30 April 2023 to 8 September 2024)

Highest attendance – 14,138 (vs Manchester United F.C. Women's Super League – 26 November 2023, Ashton Gate Stadium)

Lowest attendance – 287 (vs Southampton F.C. Women – 11 December 2022)

Highest average attendance – 6,366 (2023–24 Women's Super League)

== Player awards ==
=== Player of the Year ===
Bristol City's Player of the Year award is voted for by the club's supporters at the end of every season.

Year	Winner
2020–21	(England) Ebony Salmon
2021–22	(Scotland) Abi Harrison
2022–23	(Scotland) Abi Harrison
2023–24	(Denmark) Amalie Thestrup
2024–25	(Wales) Ffion Morgan
2025-26	(England) Emily Syme

==== Women's Young Player of the Year ====
Bristol City's Players' Player of the Year award is voted for by the club's supporters at the end of every season.

Year	Winner
2020–21	(England) Ebony Salmon
2021–22	(England) Fran Bentley
2022–23	(England) Grace Clinton
2023–24	(England) Naomi Layzell
2024–25	(England) Lexi Lloyd-Smith
2025-26	(England) Lexi Lloyd-Smith

Players player of the year

Bristol City's Players' Player of the Year award is voted for by the club's players at the end of every season

Year	Winner
2020–21	–
2021–22	–
2022–23	(England) Fran Bentley
2023–24	(England) Naomi Layzell
2024–25	(England) Emily Syme

Golden boot award

An award given to the highest scoring player for Bristol City Women of that season

Year	Winner
2020–21	(England) Ebony Salmon
2021–22	(Scotland) Abi Harrison
2022–23	(Jamaica) Shania Hayles
2023–24	(Denmark) Amalie Thestrup
2024–25	(England) Lexi Lloyd-Smith
2025-26	(England) Rio Hardy

PFA Community Champion Award

An award that recognises work performed by an outstanding individual in the community of Bristol

Year	Winner
2021–22	(Scotland) Jasmine Bull
2022–23	(Scotland) Jasmine Bull
2023–24	(Jamaica) Shania Hayles
2024–25	(Republic of Ireland) Chloe Mustaki
2025-26	(England) Lexi Lloyd-Smith

== Players with over 50 professional appearances for Bristol City ==
As of 31 March 2025

- (England) Grace Mccatty 141
- (Scotland) Abi Harrison 132
- (Wales) Loren Dykes 120
- (Scotland) Frankie Brown 117
- (England) Jasmine Matthews 115
- (England) Siobhan Chamberlain 103
- (England) Corinne Yorston 96
- (England) Sophie Baggaley 90
- (Wales) Ella Powell 88
- (England) Flo Allen 87
- (Wales) Ffion Morgan 86
- (England) Aimee Palmer 84
- (England) Carla Humphrey 84
- (Wales) Angharad James 83
- (England) Naomi Layzell 80
- (England) Emily Syme 76
- (England) Jesse Woolley 75
- (Wales) Gemma Evans 74
- (England) Jemma Rose 74
- (Belgium) Yana Daniels 72
- (England) Fran Bentley 67
- (England) Mari Ward 54
- (Spain) Laura Del Rio 57
- (England) Brooke Aspin 51

== Players with 10 or more goals for Bristol City ==
- (Scotland) Abi Harrison 39
- (Spain) Natalia Pablos 22
- (Spain) Laura Del Rio 20
- (England) Ebony Salmon 18
- (Wales) Ffion Morgan 16
- (Wales) Natasha Harding 14
- (Jamaica) Shania Hayles 14
- (England) Millie Farrow 14
- (England) Lauren Hemp 13
- (Scotland) Lucy Hope 12
- (Denmark) Amalie Thestrup 12
- (Scotland) Claire Emslie 11
- (England) Corinne Yorston 10

Most games scored in a row - 9 - Abi Harrison (October 10, 2021 - January 16, 2022)

== Players with over 10 clean sheets for Bristol City ==
As of 27 January 2025

- (England) Fran Bentley 30
- (England) Sophie Baggaley 27

== See also ==
- List of women's association football clubs in England and Wales
