= 2022–23 Women's Championship =

Women's Championship
- Season: 2022–23
- Champions: Bristol City
- Relegated: Coventry United
- Matches: 132
- Goals: 355 (2.69 per match)
- Top goalscorer: Melissa Johnson (12 goals)
- Biggest home win: London City Lionesses 9–0 Coventry United; 30 April 2023
- Biggest away win: Coventry United 0–5 London City Lionesses; 16 October 2022; Coventry United 0–5 Sunderland; 4 December 2022; Crystal Palace 0–5 London City Lionesses; 15 January 2023; Sunderland 0–5 Bristol City; 16 April 2023
- Highest scoring: London City Lionesses 9–0 Coventry United; 30 April 2023
- Longest winning run: 7 matches Birmingham City
- Longest unbeaten run: 11 matches London City Lionesses
- Longest winless run: 12 matches Blackburn Rovers
- Longest losing run: 11 matches Coventry United
- Average attendance: 968

The 2022–23 Women's Championship season (also known as the Barclays Women's Championship for sponsorship reasons) was the fifth season of the rebranded Women's Championship, the second tier of women's football in England.

Ahead of the season the top two tiers unveiled a new visual identity, dropping "The FA" from the league names as part of the long term strategy for the leagues to be under new ownership in the future. Having sponsored the first tier since the 2019–20 season, it marks the first season of Barclays as the title partner of the Women's Championship.

On 2 April 2023, Coventry United were mathematically confirmed as relegated from the Championship after four seasons in the second division. They sat 10 points adrift from safety with three games remaining. On 23 April 2023, Bristol City were confirmed as champions with one game remaining, holding a four point lead ahead of final day opponents Birmingham City. They earned promotion back to the WSL after two seasons in the Championship.

== Teams ==
Location of clubs for the 2022–23 season

Twelve teams will compete in the Championship for the 2022–23 season, the same number as the previous season. Liverpool were promoted to the FA WSL as 2021–22 FA Women's Championship winners. They were replaced by Birmingham City who finished bottom of the FA WSL in the 2021–22 season and were relegated after 20 years in the top flight. Watford were relegated to the FA Women's National League after just one season in the Championship. They were replaced by Southern Premier Division winners Southampton who beat Northern Premier Division winners Wolverhampton Wanderers in the 2021–22 FA Women's National League playoff to earn promotion.

Team	Location	Ground	Capacity	2021–22 season
Birmingham City	Birmingham	St Andrew's	29,902	WSL, 12th
Blackburn Rovers	Bamber Bridge	Sir Tom Finney Stadium	3,000	10th
Bristol City	Failand	Robins High Performance Centre		3rd
Charlton Athletic	Bexley	The Oakwood	1,180	5th
Coventry United	Coventry	Butts Park Arena	4,000	11th
Crystal Palace	Bromley	Hayes Lane	5,000	4th
Durham	Durham	Maiden Castle	1,700	6th
Lewes	Lewes	The Dripping Pan	3,000	8th
London City Lionesses	Dartford	Princes Park	4,100	2nd
Sheffield United	Sheffield	Bramall Lane	32,050	7th
Southampton	Southampton	St Mary's Stadium	32,384	WNL, 1st
Sunderland	Hetton-le-Hole	Eppleton CW	2,500	9th

=== Managerial changes ===
Team	Outgoing manager	Manner of departure	Date of vacancy	Position in table	Incoming manager	Date of appointment
Lewes	(Wales) Craig Gill (interim)	End of interim period	12 May 2022	End of season (8th)	(Scotland) Scott Booth	12 May 2022
Coventry United	(England) Jay Bradford	Resigned	28 May 2022	End of season (11th)	(England) Lee Burch	18 July 2022
Sheffield United	(England) Neil Redfearn	Resigned	25 November 2022	10th	(England) Luke Turner (interim)	25 November 2022
London City Lionesses	(United States) Melissa Phillips	Signed by Angel City FC	23 January 2023	1st	(England) Nikita Runnacles (interim)	23 January 2023
Sheffield United	(England) Luke Turner (interim)	End of interim period	14 February 2023	11th	(England) Jonathan Morgan	14 February 2023
Crystal Palace	(England) Dean Davenport	Suspended (Note: Davenport was initially suspended pending an internal investigation on 12 March 2023. His permanent departure was confirmed on 15 May 2023.)	12 March 2023	6th	(England) Mike Lowne (interim)	12 March 2023
Blackburn Rovers	(England) Gemma Donnelly	Mutual consent	4 April 2023	11th	(England) Matt Bee (interim)	4 April 2023

== Table ==
Pos	Team	Pld	W	D	L	GF	GA	GD	Pts	Qualification
1	Bristol City (C, P)	22	15	3	4	39	12	+27	48	Promotion to the WSL (Note: Dependent on obtaining a licence.)
2	Birmingham City	22	15	2	5	39	22	+17	47	
3	London City Lionesses	22	14	3	5	49	20	+29	45	
4	Charlton Athletic	22	11	5	6	34	27	+7	38	
5	Crystal Palace	22	11	1	10	28	34	−6	34	
6	Southampton	22	9	6	7	22	15	+7	33	
7	Durham	22	8	4	10	30	29	+1	28	
8	Sheffield United	22	8	3	11	32	25	+7	27	
9	Lewes	22	7	5	10	20	29	−9	26	
10	Blackburn Rovers	22	5	8	9	20	29	−9	23	
11	Sunderland	22	5	3	14	26	38	−12	18	
12	Coventry United (R)	22	2	1	19	16	75	−59	7	Relegation to the Southern Premier Division

Rules for classification: 1) Points; 2) Goal difference; 3) Number of goals scored
(C) Champions; (P) Promoted; (R) Relegated

== Results ==
Home \ Away	BLB	BRI	BIR	CHA	COV	CRY	DUR	LEW	LCL	SHU	SOU	SUN
Blackburn Rovers	—	0–0	0–2	1–1	3–2	1–3	2–2	1–0	2–3	1–0	1–1	1–0
Bristol City	2–0	—	0–1	4–0	3–2	3–0	3–0	2–0	3–1	0–1	1–1	1–0
Birmingham City	2–1	2–0	—	2–2	3–2	3–1	1–0	0–0	0–1	2–1	2–1	1–3
Charlton Athletic	2–2	0–2	3–0	—	1–0	1–1	2–0	1–0	3–4	1–0	1–0	2–2
Coventry United	3–1	0–1	0–1	1–4	—	3–2	1–5	0–1	0–5	0–4	0–4	0–5
Crystal Palace	1–0	0–3	2–4	1–2	3–0	—	1–0	4–1	0–5	2–1	1–2	0–2
Durham	3–1	1–1	1–2	1–2	5–1	0–1	—	2–1	3–0	1–0	0–0	1–1
Lewes	1–0	0–1	0–4	2–1	1–1	0–1	1–2	—	0–0	2–2	2–2	2–0
London City Lionesses	0–0	2–0	3–2	1–0	9–0	0–1	3–0	3–1	—	1–2	1–1	3–1
Sheffield United	1–1	1–3	0–1	1–0	8–0	0–1	2–0	2–3	0–2	—	0–1	4–2
Southampton	0–0	0–1	1–0	0–2	3–0	2–0	0–1	0–1	1–0	0–1	—	1–0
Sunderland	0–1	0–5	0–4	2–3	3–0	1–2	3–2	0–1	0–2	1–1	0–1	—

Source: Source
Legend: Blue = home team win; Yellow = draw; Red = away team win.

== Top scorers ==
As of 30 April 2023

Rank	Player	Club	Goals
1	(Jamaica) Melissa Johnson	Charlton Athletic	12
2	(Scotland) Sarah Ewens	London City Lionesses	11
2	(Jamaica) Shania Hayles	Bristol City	11
2	(England) Jade Pennock	Birmingham City	11
5	(England) Saffron Jordan	Blackburn Rovers	10
6	(England) Courtney Sweetman-Kirk	Sheffield United	9
7	(Jamaica) Atlanta Primus	London City Lionesses	8
7	(England) Emily Scarr	Sunderland	8
9	(England) Grace Clinton	Bristol City	7
9	(England) Mia Enderby	Sheffield United	7
9	(England) Rio Hardy	Durham	7
9	(England) Katie Wilkinson	Southampton	7

== Awards ==
=== Annual awards ===
Award	Winner	Club
Player of the Season	(England) Jade Pennock	Birmingham City
Golden Boot	(England) Melissa Johnson	Charlton Athletic
Golden Glove	(England) Fran Bentley	Bristol City

== See also ==
- 2022–23 FA Women's League Cup
- 2022–23 Women's Super League (tier 1)
- 2022–23 FA Women's National League (tier 3 & 4)
