= List of English women's football transfers summer 2021 =

The 2021 English women's football summer transfer window ran from 10 June to 31 August 2021. Players without a club could be signed at any time, clubs could sign players on loan dependent on their league's regulations, and clubs could sign a goalkeeper on an emergency loan if they had no registered senior goalkeeper available. This list includes transfers featuring at least one club from either the Women's Super League or the Women's Championship that were completed after the end of the winter 2020–21 transfer window on 2 February and before the end of the 2021 summer window.

== Transfers ==
All players and clubs without a flag are English.

Date	Name	Moving from	Moving to	Ref.
24 February 2021	(Wales) Angharad James	Reading	(United States) North Carolina Courage	
17 March 2021	Keri Matthews	Sheffield United	(United States) Arizona State Sun Devils	
23 April 2021	(Northern Ireland) Chloe McCarron	Birmingham City	Unattached	
23 April 2021	Gemma Bonner	Manchester City	(United States) Racing Louisville	
26 April 2021	Fara Williams	Reading	Retired	
7 May 2021	Sue Wood	Coventry United	Retired	
10 May 2021	(Netherlands) Jill Roord	Arsenal	(Germany) VfL Wolfsburg	
10 May 2021	(Australia) Tameka Yallop	Unattached	West Ham United	
11 May 2021	Danielle Lane	Lewes	Unattached	
12 May 2021	(Cyprus) Filippa Savva	Lewes	Unattached	
12 May 2021	(New Zealand) Erin Nayler	Reading	Unattached	
12 May 2021	(Norway) Kristine Bjørdal Leine	Reading	Unattached	
12 May 2021	Molly Childerhouse	Reading	Unattached	
12 May 2021	(Netherlands) Aniek Nouwen	(Netherlands) PSV	Chelsea	
12 May 2021	(Norway) Benedicte Håland	Bristol City	(Iceland) Selfoss	
13 May 2021	(Wales) Emma Jones	Lewes	Unattached	
13 May 2021	Ebony Salmon	Bristol City	(United States) Racing Louisville	
16 May 2021	Leandra Little	Sheffield United	Retired	
17 May 2021	(United States) Rose Lavelle	Manchester City	(United States) OL Reign	
17 May 2021	(United States) Sam Mewis	Manchester City	(United States) North Carolina Courage	
18 May 2021	(Norway) Ingrid Moe Wold	Everton	Retired	
18 May 2021	(Germany) Caroline Siems	Aston Villa	Unattached	
18 May 2021	Ella Franklin-Fraiture	Aston Villa	Unattached	
18 May 2021	Amy West	Aston Villa	Unattached	
18 May 2021	(Portugal) Diana Silva	Aston Villa	Unattached	
18 May 2021	(Netherlands) Nadine Hanssen	Aston Villa	Unattached	
19 May 2021	(Australia) Ella Mastrantonio	Bristol City	Unattached	
19 May 2021	Georgia Wilson	Bristol City	Unattached	
20 May 2021	Kirsty Barton	Crystal Palace	Brighton & Hove Albion (end of loan)	
20 May 2021	Jodie Brett	Brighton & Hove Albion	Retired	
20 May 2021	(Norway) Cecilie Fiskerstrand	Brighton & Hove Albion	Unattached	
20 May 2021	(Finland) Nora Heroum	Brighton & Hove Albion	Unattached	
20 May 2021	(Northern Ireland) Laura Rafferty	Brighton & Hove Albion	Unattached	
20 May 2021	(New Zealand) Rebekah Stott	Brighton & Hove Albion	Unattached	
20 May 2021	(South Korea) Lee Geum-min	Brighton & Hove Albion	Manchester City (end of loan)	
20 May 2021	Abbie McManus	Tottenham Hotspur	Manchester United (end of loan)	
20 May 2021	(South Korea) Cho So-hyun	Tottenham Hotspur	West Ham United (end of loan)	
21 May 2021	Anouk Denton	West Ham United	Arsenal (end of loan)	
21 May 2021	(Australia) Emily van Egmond	West Ham United	Unattached	
21 May 2021	(Norway) Cecilie Redisch Kvamme	West Ham United	Unattached	
21 May 2021	(Germany) Laura Vetterlein	West Ham United	Unattached	
21 May 2021	Anouk Denton	Arsenal	(United States) Louisville Cardinals	
22 May 2021	(Wales) Samantha Quayle	Lewes	Unattached	
24 May 2021	(New Zealand) Katie Rood	Lewes	Unattached	
24 May 2021	Helen Dermody	Coventry United	Unattached	
25 May 2021	(Wales) Anna Filbey	(Scotland) Celtic	Tottenham Hotspur (end of loan)	
25 May 2021	Elisha Sulola	Charlton Athletic	Tottenham Hotspur (end of loan)	
25 May 2021	(Dominican Republic) Lucía León	(Spain) Madrid CFF	Tottenham Hotspur (end of loan)	
25 May 2021	(Dominican Republic) Lucía León	Tottenham Hotspur	Unattached	
25 May 2021	(Norway) Aurora Mikalsen	Tottenham Hotspur	Unattached	
25 May 2021	(Netherlands) Siri Worm	Tottenham Hotspur	Unattached	
25 May 2021	Kirsty Linnett	Liverpool	Unattached	
25 May 2021	(Denmark) Amalie Thestrup	Liverpool	Unattached	
26 May 2021	(Japan) Mana Iwabuchi	Aston Villa	Arsenal	
26 May 2021	Ellie Dorey	Charlton Athletic	Unattached	
26 May 2021	(Trinidad and Tobago) Simone Eligon	Charlton Athletic	Unattached	
26 May 2021	Kara Fordjour	Charlton Athletic	Unattached	
26 May 2021	Katie Godden	Charlton Athletic	Unattached	
26 May 2021	(Wales) Alice Griffiths	Charlton Athletic	Unattached	
26 May 2021	Jamie Gotch	Charlton Athletic	Unattached	
26 May 2021	Beth Lumsden	Charlton Athletic	Unattached	
26 May 2021	Olivia Smith	Charlton Athletic	Unattached	
26 May 2021	Sophie Bradley-Auckland	Liverpool	Sheffield United	
27 May 2021	Maz Gauntlett	Coventry United	Unattached	
28 May 2021	Amber Hughes	Coventry United	Unattached	
28 May 2021	Eden Bailey	Loughborough Foxes	London City Lionesses (end of loan)	
28 May 2021	Eden Bailey	London City Lionesses	Unattached	
28 May 2021	(Finland) Juliette Kemppi	London City Lionesses	Unattached	
28 May 2021	Chantelle Mackie	London City Lionesses	Unattached	
28 May 2021	Poppy Wilson	London City Lionesses	Unattached	
1 June 2021	(Wales) Emma Gibbon	Crystal Palace	Unattached	
1 June 2021	Amber Gaylor	Crystal Palace	Unattached	
1 June 2021	Amy Taylor	Crystal Palace	Unattached	
1 June 2021	Leeta Rutherford	Crystal Palace	Unattached	
1 June 2021	Ashleigh Goddard	Crystal Palace	Unattached	
1 June 2021	Ashlee Hincks	Crystal Palace	Unattached	
1 June 2021	Andria Georgiou	Crystal Palace	Unattached	
6 June 2021	Nikki Miles	Coventry United	Unattached	
8 June 2021	Katie O'Leary	Watford	Unattached	
8 June 2021	Alysha Stojko-Down	Watford	Unattached	
8 June 2021	Kat Huggins	Watford	Unattached	
8 June 2021	Chrissie Wiggins	Watford	Unattached	
9 June 2021	Katie Wilkinson	Sheffield United	Coventry United	
10 June 2021 (Note: Player was released to free agency before joining new club)	Jessica Clarke	Liverpool	Sheffield United	
10 June 2021	Ellie Hack	Brighton & Hove Albion	Lewes	
11 June 2021	Ruby Mace	Arsenal	Manchester City	
11 June 2021	(Republic of Ireland) Cherelle Khassal	Crystal Palace	Unattached	
17 June 2021	(Jamaica) Khadija Shaw	(France) Bordeaux	Manchester City	
18 June 2021	(Denmark) Stine Larsen	Aston Villa	Unattached	
19 June 2021	Amber-Keegan Stobbs	Crystal Palace	Watford	
21 June 2021	(Netherlands) Daniëlle van de Donk	Arsenal	(France) Lyon	
21 June 2021	Ylenia Priest	London City Lionesses	Watford	
22 June 2021	(Republic of Ireland) Leanne Kiernan	West Ham United	Liverpool	
23 June 2021	(Belgium) Yana Daniëls	Bristol City	Liverpool	
24 June 2021	(United States) Christen Press	Manchester United	Unattached	
24 June 2021	(Republic of Ireland) Megan Campbell	Manchester City	Liverpool	
25 June 2021	Amy Turner	Manchester United	(United States) Orlando Pride	
25 June 2021	Jasmine Matthews	Bristol City	Liverpool	
25 June 2021	Tyler Dodds	(Italy) Napoli	Sunderland	
28 June 2021	Natasha Dowie	(Italy) Milan	Reading	
28 June 2021	(United States) Zaneta Wyne	(Scotland) Glasgow City	West Ham United	
29 June 2021	Jill Scott	Everton	Manchester City (end of loan)	
29 June 2021	(Switzerland) Alisha Lehmann	Everton	West Ham United (end of loan)	
29 June 2021	Georgia Robert	London Bees	Sheffield United	
30 June 2021	(Switzerland) Alisha Lehmann	West Ham United	Aston Villa	
30 June 2021	Freya Thomas	Leicester City	Unattached	
1 July 2021	(Republic of Ireland) Tyler Toland	Manchester City	Unattached	
1 July 2021	Remi Allen	Leicester City	Aston Villa	
1 July 2021	(France) Kenza Dali	West Ham United	Everton	
1 July 2021	Claudia Walker	Birmingham City	West Ham United	
1 July 2021	Mollie Green	Birmingham City	Coventry United	
2 July 2021	Nikita Parris	(France) Lyon	Arsenal	
2 July 2021	Sarah Mayling	Birmingham City	Aston Villa	
2 July 2021	(South Korea) Cho So-hyun	West Ham United	Tottenham Hotspur	
2 July 2021	Grace Riglar	Leicester City	Coventry United	
2 July 2021	Chantelle Boye-Hlorkah	Everton	Aston Villa	
2 July 2021	Mel Filis	London Bees	West Ham United	
2 July 2021	Carla Humphrey	Bristol City	Liverpool	
2 July 2021	Flo Fyfe	London City Lionesses	Watford	
2 July 2021	Mia Smith	Bristol City	Watford	
3 July 2021	Hannah Hampton	Birmingham City	Aston Villa	
3 July 2021	Meaghan Sargeant	Bristol City	Aston Villa	
3 July 2021	Beth Merrick	Coventry United	Wolverhampton Wanderers	
5 July 2021	Olivia Fergusson	Leicester City	Coventry United	
5 July 2021	(Spain) Vicky Losada	(Spain) Barcelona	Manchester City	
5 July 2021	(Wales) Gemma Evans	Bristol City	Reading	
5 July 2021	(Wales) Chloe O'Connor	(Wales) Cardiff Met	Bristol City	
5 July 2021	Ava Kuyken	(United States) Florida Gators	Bristol City	
6 July 2021	Faye Bryson	Bristol City	Reading	
6 July 2021	(France) Maéva Clemaron	Everton	Tottenham Hotspur	
6 July 2021	(Finland) Tinja-Riikka Korpela	Everton	Tottenham Hotspur	
6 July 2021	Naomi Hartley	Sheffield United	Coventry United	
6 July 2021	(Scotland) Jane Ross	Manchester United	(Scotland) Rangers	
6 July 2021	(Northern Ireland) Rebecca McKenna	(Northern Ireland) Linfield	Lewes	
7 July 2021	Lucy Thomas	London City Lionesses	Coventry United	
8 July 2021	Chloe Peplow	Tottenham Hotspur	Reading	
8 July 2021	(Northern Ireland) Natalie Johnson	Sheffield United	Coventry United	
9 July 2021	Toni Duggan	(Spain) Atlético Madrid	Everton	
9 July 2021	Rianna Dean	Tottenham Hotspur	Liverpool	
10 July 2021	(Sweden) Anna Anvegård	(Sweden) Rosengård	Everton	
10 July 2021	(Sweden) Nathalie Björn	(Sweden) Rosengård	Everton	
10 July 2021	Kirsty Barton	Brighton & Hove Albion	Crystal Palace	
10 July 2021	(Mexico) Silvana Flores	Reading	Tottenham Hotspur	
12 July 2021	Jodie Whiteman	Coventry United	Solihull Moors (loan)	
14 July 2021	(Republic of Ireland) Rianna Jarrett	Brighton & Hove Albion	London City Lionesses	
14 July 2021	Leah Embley	Blackburn Rovers	Brighouse Town	
14 July 2021	Ellie Fletcher	Blackburn Rovers	Unattached	
14 July 2021	Ria Montgomery	Blackburn Rovers	Unattached	
14 July 2021	Maria Edwards	Blackburn Rovers	Manchester United (end of loan)	
14 July 2021	(Wales) Elise Hughes	Blackburn Rovers	Everton (end of loan)	
14 July 2021	Simran Jhamat	Lewes	Bristol City	
14 July 2021	Rio Hardy	Unattached	Coventry United	
15 July 2021	Chloe Dixon	Sheffield United	Blackburn Rovers	
15 July 2021	Danielle Carter	Reading	Brighton & Hove Albion	
15 July 2021	Brooke Nunn	London Bees	London City Lionesses	
16 July 2021	(Germany) Leonie Maier	Arsenal	Everton	
16 July 2021	Jess Sigsworth	Manchester United	Leicester City	
16 July 2021	Molly Bartrip	Reading	Tottenham Hotspur	
16 July 2021	Charlie Wellings	Bristol City	(Scotland) Celtic	
17 July 2021	Elisha Sulola	Tottenham Hotspur	Charlton Athletic	
17 July 2021	Jade Pennock	Sheffield United	Birmingham City	
17 July 2021	Amy Rodgers	Liverpool	London City Lionesses	
17 July 2021	Charlotte Potts	Unattached	Sunderland	
19 July 2021	Jemma Purfield	Bristol City	Leicester City	
19 July 2021	(Scotland) Jamie-Lee Napier	Chelsea	London City Lionesses	
19 July 2021	Emily Batty	Sheffield United	Nottingham Forest	
20 July 2021	Georgia Brougham	Everton	Leicester City	
20 July 2021	Charlotte Fleming	Leicester City	London City Lionesses	
20 July 2021	Millie Farrow	Leicester City	Crystal Palace	
20 July 2021	Aimee Everett	Leicester City	Crystal Palace	
20 July 2021	(Norway) Vilde Bøe Risa	(Norway) Sandviken	Manchester United	
21 July 2021	(China) Tang Jiali	(China) Shanghai Shengli	Tottenham Hotspur (loan)	
21 July 2021	Emily Murphy	Chelsea	(United States) North Carolina Tar Heels	
21 July 2021	(Scotland) Abbi Grant	Birmingham City	Leicester City	
21 July 2021	(Wales) Ffion Morgan	Crystal Palace	Bristol City	
21 July 2021	Charley Clifford	Charlton Athletic	Crystal Palace	
21 July 2021	Leanne Cowan	London City Lionesses	Crystal Palace	
21 July 2021	Karin Muya	(Italy) San Marino	London City Lionesses	
22 July 2021	(Denmark) Simone Boye Sørensen	(Germany) Bayern Munich	Arsenal	
22 July 2021	Gracie Pearse	Crystal Palace	Tottenham Hotspur	
22 July 2021	Gracie Pearse	Tottenham Hotspur	Crystal Palace (loan)	
22 July 2021	Freda Ayisi	London City Lionesses	Lewes	
22 July 2021	Lara Miller	Manchester United	Lewes	
22 July 2021	(Scotland) Carly Girasoli	(Scotland) Rangers	London City Lionesses	
23 July 2021	Hannah Blundell	Chelsea	Manchester United	
23 July 2021	Lauren James	Manchester United	Chelsea	
23 July 2021	Sophie Baggaley	Bristol City	Manchester United	
23 July 2021	(Republic of Ireland) Louise Quinn	(Italy) Fiorentina	Birmingham City	
23 July 2021	Anna Pedersen	Everton	London City Lionesses	
23 July 2021	Heidi Logan	Birmingham City	Lewes	
23 July 2021	(Scotland) Charlotte Newsham	Blackburn Rovers	Sheffield United	
23 July 2021	Molly Sharpe	Durham	Crystal Palace	
23 July 2021	(Kosovo) Elizabeta Ejupi	London City Lionesses	Durham	
26 July 2021	(Republic of Ireland) Courtney Brosnan	West Ham United	Everton	
26 July 2021	Molly Pike	Everton	Leicester City	
26 July 2021	Aoife Mannion	Manchester City	Manchester United	
26 July 2021	Rinsola Babajide	Liverpool	Brighton & Hove Albion (loan)	
27 July 2021	Abbie McManus	Manchester United	Leicester City	
27 July 2021	(Norway) Frida Maanum	(Sweden) Linköping	Arsenal	
27 July 2021	(Scotland) Sarah Ewens	(Scotland) Celtic	Birmingham City	
27 July 2021	(Republic of Ireland) Lucy Quinn	Tottenham Hotspur	Birmingham City	
27 July 2021	Abbey-Leigh Stringer	Everton	West Ham United	
27 July 2021	Emma Kelly	Birmingham City	Sunderland	
27 July 2021	(Wales) Ella Powell	Charlton Athletic	Bristol City	
27 July 2021	Jenna Legg	Charlton Athletic	Watford	
28 July 2021	(Scotland) Martha Thomas	West Ham United	Manchester United	
28 July 2021	Libby Smith	Leicester City	Birmingham City	
28 July 2021	Hannah Coan	Everton	Blackburn Rovers	
28 July 2021	(Italy) Aurora Galli	(Italy) Juventus	Everton	
28 July 2021	(Canada) Deanne Rose	(United States) Florida Gators	Reading	
28 July 2021	(Jamaica) Satara Murray	(United States) Austin Elite	Bristol City	
28 July 2021	(Northern Ireland) Ellie Mason	London City Lionesses	Lewes	
28 July 2021	Kallie Balfour	London City Lionesses	Lewes	
28 July 2021	Amelia Hazard	Unattached	Lewes	
29 July 2021	Holly Morgan	Leicester City	Retired	
29 July 2021	(Wales) Anna Filbey	Tottenham Hotspur	Charlton Athletic	
29 July 2021	Mia Parry	Liverpool Feds	Blackburn Rovers	
29 July 2021	Mollie Rouse	Lewes	London City Lionesses	
30 July 2021	(Scotland) Hannah Godfrey	Tottenham Hotspur	Charlton Athletic	
30 July 2021	Hollie Olding	Brighton & Hove Albion	Charlton Athletic	
30 July 2021	Beth Roe	Brighton & Hove Albion	Charlton Athletic	
30 July 2021	(Republic of Ireland) Megan Wynne	Bristol City	Charlton Athletic	
30 July 2021	Becky Jane	Liverpool	Charlton Athletic	
30 July 2021	Mia Ross	Liverpool	Charlton Athletic	
30 July 2021	Kiera Skeels	Reading	Charlton Athletic	
30 July 2021	Lauren Bruton	Reading	Charlton Athletic	
30 July 2021	Sophie Quirk	London Bees	Charlton Athletic	
30 July 2021	(Republic of Ireland) Lois Roche	Unattached	Charlton Athletic	
30 July 2021	(Wales) Elise Hughes	Everton	Charlton Athletic	
30 July 2021	Emma Follis	Aston Villa	Charlton Athletic	
30 July 2021	Chioma Ubogagu	(Spain) Real Madrid	Tottenham Hotspur	
30 July 2021	Megan Hornby	Manchester United	Blackburn Rovers	
31 July 2021	Mia Enderby	Unattached	Sheffield United	
1 August 2021	(Australia) Isobel Dalton	(Australia) Brisbane Roar	Lewes	
3 August 2021	Lucy Parker	(United States) UCLA Bruins	West Ham United	
4 August 2021	(Denmark) Cecilie Sandvej	(France) Fleury	Birmingham City	
5 August 2021	Sophie Whitehouse	Birmingham City	Bristol City	
5 August 2021	Georgia Clifford	Crystal Palace	Watford	
6 August 2021	Fran Bentley	Manchester United	Bristol City (loan)	
6 August 2021	Asmita Ale	Aston Villa	Tottenham Hotspur	
6 August 2021	(New Zealand) Anna Leat	Unattached	West Ham United	
6 August 2021	Emily Ramsey	Manchester United	Birmingham City (loan)	
6 August 2021	(Scotland) Lisa Robertson	(Scotland) Celtic	Birmingham City (loan)	
6 August 2021	(Wales) Ellie Leek	Lewes	Blackburn Rovers	
7 August 2021	(Australia) Kyah Simon	(Netherlands) PSV	Tottenham Hotspur	
7 August 2021	Nina Wilson	London City Lionesses	Sheffield United	
8 August 2021	Georgie Ferguson	Unattached	Watford	
10 August 2021	(Jamaica) Melissa Johnson	Sheffield United	Bristol City	
13 August 2021	(South Korea) Lee Geum-min	Manchester City	Brighton & Hove Albion	
13 August 2021	(Scotland) Lisa Evans	Arsenal	West Ham United (loan)	
13 August 2021	Eleanor Heeps	Liverpool	Tottenham Hotspur	
13 August 2021	Eleanor Heeps	Tottenham Hotspur	Blackburn Rovers (loan)	
16 August 2021	Mayumi Pacheco	West Ham United	Aston Villa	
17 August 2021	(Belgium) Justine Vanhaevermaet	(Norway) LSK Kvinner	Reading	
18 August 2021	(Australia) Hayley Raso	Everton	Manchester City	
18 August 2021	(Japan) Yui Hasegawa	(Italy) Milan	West Ham United	
18 August 2021	Lia Cataldo	Leicester City	Bristol City	
19 August 2021	Aggie Beever-Jones	Chelsea	Bristol City (loan)	
19 August 2021	(Germany) Lisa Weiß	Aston Villa	(Germany) VfL Wolfsburg	
19 August 2021	Brooke Cairns	Everton	West Ham United	
19 August 2021	Grace Garrad	Arsenal	West Ham United	
19 August 2021	Katie Startup	Brighton & Hove Albion	Liverpool (loan)	
20 August 2021	(United States) Abby Dahlkemper	Manchester City	Unattached	
20 August 2021	(Iceland) Cecilía Rán Rúnarsdóttir	(Sweden) Örebro	Everton	
20 August 2021	(Iceland) Cecilía Rán Rúnarsdóttir	Everton	(Sweden) Örebro (loan)	
20 August 2021	Charlotte Wardlaw	Chelsea	Liverpool (loan)	
20 August 2021	Emily Orman	Chelsea	Crystal Palace (loan)	
23 August 2021	Connie Scofield	Birmingham City	Leicester City	
23 August 2021	Grace Coombs	Charlton Athletic	Crystal Palace	
24 August 2021	(Sweden) Hanna Bennison	(Sweden) Rosengård	Everton	
27 August 2021	(Australia) Alanna Kennedy	Tottenham Hotspur	Manchester City	
28 August 2021	(Republic of Ireland) Marie Hourihan	(Portugal) Braga	Birmingham City	
28 August 2021	Tara Bourne	Manchester United	Sheffield United (loan)	
28 August 2021	(Republic of Ireland) Jamie Finn	(Republic of Ireland) Shelbourne	Birmingham City	
28 August 2021	(Germany) Shanell Salgado	Charlton Athletic	Lewes	
1 September 2021	(Republic of Ireland) Ruesha Littlejohn	Birmingham City	Aston Villa	
2 September 2021	Fran Stenson	Arsenal	Brighton & Hove Albion (loan)	
2 September 2021	(Australia) Emily Gielnik	(Sweden) Vittsjö	Aston Villa	
2 September 2021	Arabella Suttie	Chelsea	Birmingham City	
2 September 2021	(Sweden) Filippa Angeldahl	(Sweden) Häcken	Manchester City	
3 September 2021	Gemma Davison	Tottenham Hotspur	Aston Villa	
3 September 2021	(United States) Tobin Heath	Manchester United	Arsenal	
3 September 2021	Emily Syme	Aston Villa	Sheffield United (loan)	
3 September 2021	(Republic of Ireland) Eleanor Ryan-Doyle	(Republic of Ireland) Peamount United	Birmingham City	
3 September 2021	(Republic of Ireland) Emily Whelan	(Republic of Ireland) Shelbourne	Birmingham City	
3 September 2021	Sophie Hillyerd	Manchester United	Charlton Athletic	
3 September 2021	(Wales) Georgia Walters	Blackburn Rovers	Liverpool	
21 September 2021	(Netherlands) Iris Achterhof	Durham	Sunderland	
