= 2020–21 Bristol City W.F.C. season =

Bristol City
2020–21 season
- Chairman: Simon Arnold
- Head Coach: Tanya Oxtoby (until 15 January); Matt Beard (maternity cover) (from 15 January)
- Stadium: Twerton Park, Bath
- FA WSL: 12th (relegated)
- FA Cup: Fourth round
- League Cup: Runner-up
- Top goalscorer: League: Ebony Salmon (6); All: Ebony Salmon (10)
Home colours	Away colours	Third colours

The 2020–21 Bristol City W.F.C. season was the club's fifth season under the Bristol City affiliation and the organisation's 22nd overall season in existence. It was their fourth consecutive full season in the FA Women's Super League following promotion to the 2017 Spring Season. Along with competing in the WSL, the club also competed in two domestic cup competitions: the FA Cup and the League Cup.

In a bid to enable increased attendances amid COVID-19 restrictions and social distancing measures, Bristol City announced they were moving from the 1,500 capacity Stoke Gifford Stadium in Filton which had been purpose-built by the club in 2011 ahead of the first WSL season, to Twerton Park, an 8,800 capacity stadium home to Bath City FC. On 2 September, Jasmine Matthews was named as captain following the departure of Loren Dykes.

On 15 January 2021, Tanya Oxtoby temporarily stepped down as head coach to take maternity leave. Two-time WSL winner Matt Beard, who had left West Ham United in November, was appointed caretaker manager until the end of the season.

== Squad ==
As of 28 January 2021.

Note: Flags indicate national team as defined under FIFA eligibility rules; some limited exceptions apply. Players may hold more than one non-FIFA nationality.

No.	Pos.	Nation	Player
1	GK	ENG	Sophie Baggaley
2	DF	ENG	Faye Bryson
3	DF	WAL	Gemma Evans
4	DF	ENG	Jasmine Matthews (captain)
5	DF	NIR	Laura Rafferty (on loan from Brighton & Hove Albion)
7	MF	ENG	Molly Pike (on loan from Everton)
8	MF	ENG	Carla Humphrey
9	FW	ENG	Ebony Salmon
10	FW	BEL	Yana Daniëls
11	FW	ENG	Charlie Wellings
12	DF	ENG	Florence Allen
13	GK	NOR	Benedicte Håland
14	MF	ENG	Aimee Palmer
15	MF	WAL	Megan Wynne

No.	Pos.	Nation	Player
16	DF	ENG	Meaghan Sargeant
17	FW	ENG	Emma Bissell
18	DF	ENG	Maisy Collis
20	MF	ENG	Georgia Wilson
21	FW	SCO	Abi Harrison
23	DF	ENG	Jemma Purfield
25	DF	ENG	Naomi Layzell
26	MF	AUS	Ella Mastrantonio
27	FW	ENG	Jessica Wooley
28	MF	WAL	Ellen Jones
29	DF	ENG	Kiera Skeels (on loan from Reading)
31	GK	ENG	Mia Smith
—	FW	ENG	Izzy Cook

== FA Women's Super League ==
=== Results summary ===
Overall								Home						Away					
Pld	W	D	L	GF	GA	GD	Pts	W	D	L	GF	GA	GD	W	D	L	GF	GA	GD
22	2	6	14	18	72	−54	12	2	1	8	8	33	−25	0	5	6	10	39	−29

Last updated: 9 May 2021.
Source: FA WSL

=== Results by matchday ===
Round	1	2	3	4	5	6	7	8	9	10	11	12	13	14	15	16	17	18	19	20	21	22
Ground	H	A	A	H	A	H	A	H	H	A	A	H	A	H	H	H	A	A	H	A	H	A
Result	L	L	L	L	L	D	D	L	L	L	L	W	D	L	W	L	D	D	L	D	L	L
Position	11	12	12	12	12	12	12	12	12	12	12	12	12	12	11	12	11	10	11	12	12	12

A = Away; H = Home; W = Win; D = Draw; L = Loss

=== Results ===
6 September 2020 1	Bristol City	0–4	Everton	Bath
14:00	Palmer (yellow card) 28'; Bryson (yellow card) 48'	Report	Magill 7'; Graham 19', 62' (pen.); Seveke (yellow card) 78'; Gauvin 90'	Stadium: Twerton Park; Attendance: Behind-closed-doors; Referee: Scott Johnson

13 September 2020 2	Chelsea	9–0	Bristol City	Kingston upon Thames
12:30	Kirby 15'; Mjelde 31' (pen.); Leupolz 34'; Cuthbert 36'; Bright 40'; England 66'; Charles 69'; Harder 73'; Kerr 86'	Report	Bryson (yellow card) 90+3'	Stadium: Kingsmeadow; Attendance: Behind-closed-doors; Referee: Stacey Pearson

4 October 2020 3	Arsenal	3–1	Bristol City	Borehamwood
14:00	Nobbs 42'; Foord 50'; Miedema 86'	Report	Harrison 6'	Stadium: Meadow Park; Attendance: Behind-closed-doors; Referee: Emily Heaslip

11 October 2020	Bristol City	P–P	Aston Villa	Bath
14:00				Stadium: Twerton Park
Note: Game postponed following positive COVID-19 test by Aston Villa player

18 October 2020 4	Bristol City	0–4	Birmingham City	Bath
14:00	Matthews (yellow card) 27'	Report	Corsie 16', (yellow card) 74'; Green 32'; Walker 50'; Murray 65' (pen.); Grant (yellow card) 90' (yellow-red card) 90+7'	Stadium: Twerton Park; Attendance: Behind-closed-doors; Referee: Stacey Pearson

7 November 2020 5	Manchester City	8–1	Bristol City	Manchester
15:00	Baggaley 9' (o.g.); Coombs 39'; Walsh 42'; Bronze 43'; Stanway 48'; White 58', 85'; Beckie 81'	Report	Salmon 11'	Stadium: Academy Stadium; Attendance: Behind-closed-doors; Referee: Cristiana Hattersley
Note: Request for the game's postponement denied after five Bristol players were forced into COVID-19 isolation

14 November 2020 6	Bristol City	2–2	Tottenham Hotspur	Bath
18:30	Logarzo 37' (pen.); Salmon 90+2'	Report	Worm 42'; Neville 64', (yellow card) 81'; Dean (red card) 77'	Stadium: Twerton Park; Attendance: Behind-closed-doors; Referee: Lisa Benn

6 December 2020 7	Reading	1–1	Bristol City	Reading
14:00	Williams 50'; Cooper (yellow card) 62'	Report	Bissell 43'	Stadium: Madejski Stadium; Attendance: 433; Referee: Lucy Oliver

9 December 2020 8	Bristol City	0–4	Aston Villa	Bath
18:30	Bryson (yellow card) 75'	Report	Petzelberger 42', 67', (yellow card) 64'; Hayles 57', 75'	Stadium: Twerton Park; Attendance: Behind-closed-doors; Referee: Amy Fearn
Note: Rescheduled from 11 October 2020 following positive COVID-19 test by Aston Villa player.

13 December 2020 9	Bristol City	0–4	West Ham United	Bath
14:00	Mastrantonio (yellow card) 33'	Report	Purfield 11' (o.g.); van Egmond 58'; Daly 64'; Flaherty (yellow card) 67'; Thomas 86'	Stadium: Twerton Park; Referee: Elizabeth Simms

20 December 2020 10	Manchester United	6–1	Bristol City	Leigh
14:00	Galton 26', 63'; M. Turner 45+2'; Sigsworth 52'; Ladd (yellow card) 66'; Heath 83', 86'	Report	Rafferty (yellow card) 40'; Salmon 72'	Stadium: Leigh Sports Village; Attendance: Behind-closed-doors; Referee: Lisa Benn

10 January 2021	Bristol City	P–P	Brighton & Hove Albion	Bath
14:00				Stadium: Twerton Park
Note: Postponed due to positive COVID-19 cases in Brighton squad

17 January 2021 11	Everton	4–0	Bristol City	Liverpool
13:00	Christiansen 4', 58'; Magill 38'; Finnigan 64'; Stringer (yellow card) 85'	Report		Stadium: Walton Hall Park; Attendance: Behind-closed-doors; Referee: Cristiana Hattersley

24 January 2021	Bristol City	P–P	Chelsea	Bath
14:00				Stadium: Twerton Park
Note: Postponed due to heavy snowfall

30 January 2021 12	Bristol City	3–0	Brighton & Hove Albion	Bath
14:00	Daniëls 3'; Salmon 34', 59' (pen.)	Report	Green (red card) 68'; Le Tissier (yellow card) 90+2'	Stadium: Twerton Park; Attendance: Behind-closed-doors; Referee: Lucy Oliver
Note: Rescheduled from 10 January 2021 following positive COVID-19 cases in Brighton squad.

7 February 2021 13	West Ham United	1–1	Bristol City	Dagenham
15:00	Pacheco (yellow card) 17'; Svitková 49', (yellow card) 64'	Report	van Egmond 7' (o.g.); Purfield (yellow card) 45+2'	Stadium: Victoria Road; Attendance: Behind-closed-doors; Referee: Sarah Garrett

10 February 2021	Tottenham Hotspur	P–P	Bristol City	Canons Park
19:30				Stadium: The Hive
Note: Postponed due to frozen pitch

14 February 2021 14	Bristol City	0–5	Chelsea	Bath
15:00		Report	Kirby 14', 40'; Harder 36'; Kerr 55'; England 60'	Stadium: Twerton Park; Attendance: Behind-closed-door; Referee: Emily Heaslip
Note: Rescheduled from 24 January 2021 due to heavy snowfall

8 March 2021 15	Bristol City	3–2	Reading	Bristol
20:15	Wellings 24'; Daniëls (yellow card) 50'; Purfield 58'; Salmon 79'	Report	Harries 13'; Rowe (yellow card) 40' (yellow-red card) 90+3', (goal) 73'	Stadium: Ashton Gate; Attendance: Behind-closed-doors; Referee: Rebecca Welch

17 March 2021 16	Bristol City	0–3	Manchester City	Bath
19:30		Report	Weir 12'; White 30'; Stanway (yellow card) 76'; Mewis 89'	Stadium: Twerton Park; Attendance: Behind-closed-doors; Referee: Scott Jackson

21 March 2021 17	Tottenham Hotspur	1–1	Bristol City	Canons Park
14:00	Worm 3', (yellow card) 27'; Cho (yellow card) 82'	Report	Evans 52'; Daniëls (yellow card) 66'	Stadium: The Hive; Attendance: Behind-closed-doors; Referee: Rebecca Welch
Note: Rescheduled from 10 February 2021 due to frozen pitch

28 March 2021 18	Birmingham City	1–1	Bristol City	Solihull
16:00	Holloway (yellow card) 23'; Littlejohn (yellow card) 42'; Murray 58'	Report	Wellings 13', (yellow card) 64'; Evans (yellow card) 83'; Skeels (yellow card) 85'	Stadium: Damson Park; Attendance: Behind-closed-doors; Referee: Kirsty Dowle

4 April 2021 19	Bristol City	0–4	Arsenal	Bath
14:00		Report	Miedema 4', 65'; van de Donk 45+1'; Mead 63'	Stadium: Twerton Park; Attendance: Behind-closed-doors; Referee: Sarah Garratt

24 April 2021 20	Aston Villa	2–2	Bristol City	Walsall
12:30	Sargeant 3' (o.g.); N'Dow (yellow card) 15'; Haigh 35'; Asante (yellow card) 69'	Report	Evans (yellow card) 37'; Bryson 74'; Mastrantonio 90+5'	Stadium: Bescot Stadium; Attendance: Behind-closed-doors; Referee: Emily Heaslip

2 May 2021 21	Bristol City	0–1	Manchester United	Bath
14:00	Bryson (yellow card) 83'; Purfield (yellow card) 86'	Report	Daniëls 79' (o.g.); Zelem (yellow card) 88'	Stadium: Twerton Park; Attendance: Behind-closed-doors; Referee: Lisa Benn

9 May 2021 22	Brighton & Hove Albion	3–1	Bristol City	Crawley
14:30	Le Tissier 7'; Geum-min 52', (yellow card) 82'; Kaagman 76'; Green (yellow card) 89'	Report	Salmon (yellow card) 45+2'; Harrison 61'	Stadium: Broadfield Stadium; Attendance: Behind-closed-doors; Referee: Amy Fearns

=== League table ===
Pos	Team	Pld	W	D	L	GF	GA	GD	Pts	Qualification or relegation
8	Tottenham Hotspur	22	5	5	12	18	41	−23	20	
9	West Ham United	22	3	6	13	21	39	−18	15	
10	Aston Villa	22	3	6	13	15	47	−32	15	
11	Birmingham City	22	3	6	13	15	44	−29	14 (Note: On 7 May 2021, Birmingham City were deducted one point for fielding an ineligible player in a draw against Reading on 25 April 2021.)	
12	Bristol City (R)	22	2	6	14	18	72	−54	12	Relegation to the Championship

Source: FA WSL
Rules for classification: 1) Points; 2) Goal difference; 3) Number of goals scored.
(R) Relegated

== Women's FA Cup ==
As a member of the top two tiers, Bristol City will enter FA Cup in the fourth round proper. Originally scheduled to take place on 31 January 2021, it was delayed due to COVID-19 restrictions.

18 April 2021 Fourth round	Brighton & Hove Albion	1–0	Bristol City	Crawley
14:00	Kaagman 64' (pen.)	Report		Stadium: Broadfield Stadium; Attendance: Behind-closed-doors

== FA Women's League Cup ==
=== Group stage ===
7 October 2020 Group stage	Bristol City	4–0	London Bees	Bath
19:30	Rafferty (yellow card) 3'; Robert 10' (o.g.); Logarzo 12'; Salmon 80'; Wellings 82'	Report	Gamby (yellow card) 28'	Stadium: Twerton Park; Attendance: Behind-closed-doors; Referee: Dale Wootton

5 November 2020 Group stage	Crystal Palace	2–4	Bristol City	Bromley
19:45	Goddard (yellow card) 30'; Baptiste 55', 58'; Haines (yellow card) 63'	Report	Bissell 19'; Logarzo 30', 41'; Wellings 51'	Stadium: Hayes Lane; Attendance: Behind-closed-doors; Referee: Ryan Atkin

18 November 2020 Group stage	Lewes	1–3	Bristol City	Lewes
19:45	Cleverly 55', (yellow card) 87'	Report	Purfield 22'; Bissell 30'; Salmon 31'	Stadium: The Dripping Pan; Attendance: Behind-closed-doors; Referee: Chloe-Ann Anderson

Pos	Team	Pld	W	WPEN	LPEN	L	GF	GA	GD	Pts	Qualification	BRI	CRY	LON	LEW
1	Bristol City	3	3	0	0	0	11	3	+8	9	Advanced to knock-out stage	—	—	4–0	—
2	Crystal Palace	3	2	0	0	1	10	6	+4	6	Possible knock-out stage based on ranking	2–4	—	6–1	—
3	London Bees	3	1	0	0	2	2	10	−8	3		—	—	—	1–0
4	Lewes	3	0	0	0	3	2	6	−4	0		1–3	1–2	—	—

Source: thefa.com
Rules for classification: 1) Points; 2) Goal difference; 3) Number of goals scored; 4) Number of wins; 5) Head-to-head record

=== Knockout stage ===
13 January 2021 Quarter-final	Bristol City	2–1	Aston Villa	Bath
19:30	Salmon 55', 58'	Report	Larsen 86'	Stadium: Twerton Park; Attendance: Behind-closed-doors; Referee: Robert Massey-Ellis

3 February 2021 Semi-final	Bristol City	1–0	Leicester City	Bath
19:30	Skeels 72'	Report	Barker (yellow card) 35'; Smith (yellow card) 65'	Stadium: Twerton Park; Attendance: Behind-closed-doors; Referee: Rebecca Welch

14 March 2021 Final	Bristol City	0–6	Chelsea	Watford
14:30	Palmer (yellow card) 77'; Rafferty (yellow card) 90+6'	Report	Kerr 3', 10', 48'; Kirby 28', 34'; Reiten 55'	Stadium: Vicarage Road; Attendance: Behind-closed-doors; Referee: Abi Byrne

== Squad statistics ==
=== Appearances ===
As of 9 May 2021

Starting appearances are listed first, followed by substitute appearances after the + symbol where applicable.

No.	Pos	Nat	Player	Total		FA WSL		FA Cup		League Cup	
No.	Pos	Nat	Player	Apps	Goals	Apps	Goals	Apps	Goals	Apps	Goals
1	GK	(England) ENG	Sophie Baggaley	27	0	21	0	1	0	5	0
2	DF	(England) ENG	Faye Bryson	17	1	7+8	1	0	0	2	0
3	DF	(Wales) WAL	Gemma Evans	27	1	20	1	1	0	6	0
4	DF	(England) ENG	Jasmine Matthews	13	0	9+1	0	0	0	2+1	0
5	DF	(Northern Ireland) NIR	Laura Rafferty	17	0	6+7	0	0	0	2+2	0
7	MF	(England) ENG	Molly Pike	12	0	11	0	1	0	0	0
8	MF	(England) ENG	Carla Humphrey	27	0	20+1	0	1	0	5	0
9	FW	(England) ENG	Ebony Salmon	27	10	15+5	6	1	0	6	4
10	FW	(Belgium) BEL	Yana Daniëls	28	1	19+3	1	1	0	4+1	0
11	FW	(England) ENG	Charlie Wellings	26	4	17+3	2	1	0	3+2	2
12	DF	(England) ENG	Flo Allen	20	0	14+2	0	0	0	4	0
13	GK	(Norway) NOR	Benedicte Håland	2	0	1	0	0	0	1	0
14	MF	(England) ENG	Aimee Palmer	20	0	11+4	0	1	0	3+1	0
15	MF	(Wales) WAL	Megan Wynne	0	0	0	0	0	0	0	0
16	DF	(England) ENG	Meaghan Sargeant	4	0	3	0	1	0	0	0
17	FW	(England) ENG	Emma Bissell	24	3	8+10	1	0+1	0	5	2
18	MF	(England) ENG	Maisy Collis	0	1	0	0	0	0	0	0+1
20	MF	(England) ENG	Georgia Wilson	3	0	0+2	0	0	0	0+1	0
21	FW	(Scotland) SCO	Abi Harrison	26	2	8+12	2	0+1	0	2+3	0
23	DF	(England) ENG	Jemma Purfield	27	2	21	1	1	0	5	1
25	DF	(England) ENG	Naomi Layzell	13	0	4+3	0	0+1	0	1+4	0
26	MF	(Australia) AUS	Ella Mastrantonio	20	1	10+5	1	0+1	0	4	0
27	FW	(England) ENG	Jessica Wooley	1	0	0+1	0	0	0	0	0
28	MF	(Wales) WAL	Ellen Jones	8	0	1+4	0	0	0	1+2	0
29	DF	(England) ENG	Kiera Skeels	13	1	9+1	0	1	0	2	1
31	GK	(England) ENG	Mia Smith	0	0	0	0	0	0	0	0
	FW	(England) ENG	Izzy Cook	1	0	0	0	0	0	0+1	0
Players who appeared for the club but left during the season:
6	MF	(Australia) AUS	Chloe Logarzo	11	4	7+1	1	0	0	3	3

== Transfers ==
=== Transfers in ===
Date	Position	Nationality	Name	From	Ref.
30 June 2020	MF	(Australia)	Ella Mastrantonio	(Australia) Western Sydney Wanderers	
2 July 2020	MF	(England)	Aimee Palmer	(England) Manchester United	
6 July 2020	MF	(Wales)	Megan Wynne	(England) Tottenham Hotspur	
7 July 2020	DF	(England)	Jemma Purfield	(England) Liverpool	
19 August 2020	FW	(England)	Emma Bissell	(England) Manchester City	
3 September 2020	GK	(Norway)	Benedicte Håland	(Switzerland) FF Lugano 1976	

=== Loans in ===
Date	Position	Nationality	Name	From	Until	Ref.
5 September 2020	DF	(Northern Ireland)	Laura Rafferty	(England) Brighton & Hove Albion	End of season	
28 January 2021	DF	(England)	Kiera Skeels	(England) Reading	End of season	
28 January 2021	MF	(England)	Molly Pike	(England) Everton	End of season	

=== Transfers out ===
Date	Position	Nationality	Name	To	Ref.
1 June 2020	DF	(England)	Poppy Pattinson	(England) Everton	
5 June 2020	MF	(New Zealand)	Olivia Chance	(England) Sheffield United	
11 June 2020	MF	(England)	Katie Robinson	(England) Brighton & Hove Albion	
22 June 2020	GK	(Scotland)	Eartha Cumings	(England) Charlton Athletic	
22 June 2020	FW	(South Korea)	Jeon Ga-eul	(England) Reading	
7 July 2020	DF	(Scotland)	Frankie Brown		
15 July 2020	DF	(Wales)	Loren Dykes	(Wales) Cardiff City Ladies	
5 September 2020	FW	(England)	Ella Rutherford	(England) Charlton Athletic	
28 January 2021	FW	(Australia)	Chloe Logarzo	(United States) Kansas City NWSL	
