= 2021 FA Women's League Cup final =

Tenth edition of FA Women's League Cup Final

- Event: 2020–21 FA Women's League Cup
Bristol City	Chelsea
0	6
- Date: 14 March 2021
- Venue: Vicarage Road, Watford
- Player of the Match: Fran Kirby (Chelsea)
- Referee: Abigail Byrne
- Attendance: 0 (behind closed doors)

The 2021 FA Women's League Cup final was the 10th final of the FA Women's League Cup, England's secondary cup competition for women's football teams and its primary league cup tournament. It took place on 14 March 2021 at Vicarage Road, and was contested by Bristol City and Chelsea.

It was the first final to not feature either Arsenal or Manchester City. Chelsea made their second appearance in a League Cup final having won the previous season's edition. Bristol City contested their first League Cup final and their first major cup final since they reached the 2013 FA Cup final as Bristol Academy. They became the seventh team in the trophy's ten-year history to reach a final.

== Route to the final ==
=== Bristol City ===
Round	Opposition	Score
GS	London Bees (H)	4–0
GS	Crystal Palace (A)	4–2
GS	Lewes (A)	3–1
QF	Aston Villa (H)	2–1
SF	Leicester City (H)	1–0
Key: (H) = Home venue; (A) = Away venue.

Despite struggling in the league − Bristol only had one win in the WSL at the time of their semi-final victory, amassing a total of five points from 12 games with a −40 goal difference − they strung together five consecutive wins to reach their first League Cup final. To reduce the total number of games as a result of the ongoing COVID-19 pandemic, the previous format of four groups of six was altered to six groups of four, reducing the number of group stage games each team played from five to three.

Bristol were drawn as the only WSL team in a regional group alongside three Championship teams. They opened group play at home to London Bees, opening up a quick two goal lead as a Georgia Robert own goal and Chloe Logarzo strike in the opening 12 minutes put the Robins in control. With the revised format meaning goal difference would likely be a deciding factor come the end of the group stage, Bristol scored another two goals in the closing ten minutes courtesy of Ebony Salmon and Charlie Wellings to close out a 4–0 win, their first victory and clean sheet of the season having previously lost all three of their opening league games. The second game, against Crystal Palace, saw Bristol score four again with Emma Bissell opening the scoring with a volley, her first career goal in senior football. A brace from Chloe Logarzo gave the Robins a three goal lead at the break with Charlie Wellings adding a fourth six minutes after the restart. Crystal Palace threatened a comeback via a quickfire Bianca Baptiste double in the 55th and 58th halving the deficit but Bristol held on for the 4–2 victory in Bromley. A third routine win against Championship opposition, this time 3–1 against Lewes who finished bottom on the group with three defeats, clinched Bristol's progression to the knockout stage for the first time since the 2017–18 campaign.

For the quarter-finals, Bristol City were drawn against a top-flight team for the first time in the competition in the shape of Aston Villa who had earned promotion the previous season and transitioned to a fully-professional team for the first time as a result. They had finished top of a group that, like Bristol's, had contained three second division teams. At the time of the match, Aston Villa were 11th in the WSL having taken six points from eight games, four points ahead of Bristol. Despite missing three key first-team players; goalkeeper Sophie Baggaley and midfielder Carla Humphrey who were positive for COVID-19 and defender Jemma Purfield who was deemed a close contact, Bristol put in one of their most resilient performances of the season. After a goalless first half, Ebony Salmon broke the deadlock against her former club with two breakaway goals before the hour mark. Aston Villa's persistence eventually paid off as substitute Stine Larsen found a way past Benedicte Håland, the stand-in goalkeeper making her first appearance for the club, in the 86th-minute but it was too little too late as the hosts hung on for a 2–1 win. In the semi-final, Bristol faced Championship leaders Leicester City who had turned professional during the offseason and were in the knockout stage of the League Cup for the first time. Bristol City, in their third week of interim management under Matt Beard after Tanya Oxtoby had stepped down to take maternity leave, came into the game off the back of their first WSL win of the season, a convincing 3–0 victory over fellow strugglers Brighton & Hove Albion. A tightly-contested match, Bristol edged past their lower league opposition 1–0 courtesy of a first senior career goal for Kiera Skeels who had joined the club on loan from Reading six days earlier.

=== Chelsea ===
Round	Opposition	Score
GS	Arsenal (H)	4–1
GS	Tottenham Hotspur (H)	2–0
GS	London City Lionesses (A)	Canc.
QF	Manchester City (A)	4–2 (a.e.t)
SF	West Ham United (H)	6–0
Key: (H) = Home venue; (A) = Away venue.

Chelsea entered the season off the back of a league and cup double having won the League Cup final the previous February before being awarded the WSL title on a points-per-game basis following the season's curtailment due to the COVID-19 pandemic in June. They continued their relative domestic dominance by reaching their second consecutive League Cup final and setting a new unbeaten WSL record of 32 matches in January 2021. To reduce the total number of games during the pandemic, the previous format of four groups of six was altered to six groups of four, reducing the number of group stage games each team played from five to three.

Chelsea were drawn in a regional group with two WSL teams, Arsenal and Tottenham Hotspur, as well as professional Championship side London City Lionesses. Their opening match was a repeat of the previous year's final against Arsenal, one of only three teams to have previously won the competition. Having beaten Arsenal in the previous three meetings in all competitions, Chelsea continued their run against their traditional title rivals with a convincing 4–1 win. Chelsea captain Magdalena Eriksson opened the scoring in the 5th-minute but the Gunners found a near instant reply through Caitlin Foord. Guro Reiten first put Chelsea back ahead two minutes later and then doubled the lead in the 15th-minute as the Blues reacted to conceding fast. It wasn't until the final minute that Bethany England scored Chelsea's fourth in a game that, although seemingly pivotal in a reduced group stage with little margin for error, saw no live coverage much to the disappointment and criticism of fans. In the second game, Erin Cuthbert and summer recruit Melanie Leupolz lifted Chelsea to a routine 2–0 win over a struggling Tottenham side that had picked up one point from their opening five league game. It gave the Blues control of the group entering the final round of matches. Initially postponed following three positive COVID-19 tests by London City Lionesses players, Chelsea's final group match eventually went unfulfilled as Arsenal's penalty win over Spurs meant the standings would go unchanged regardless of result and Chelsea were guaranteed to qualify as group winners for the fourth consecutive season.

Chelsea were drawn away to Manchester City in the quarter-finals, the only other team along with Arsenal and themselves to have won the trophy. Initially scheduled for 13 January, it was played a week later following a COVID-19 outbreak in the Manchester City first-team squad after some players traveled to Dubai over the winter break. Melanie Leupolz had put Chelsea ahead just before half-time but City leveled shortly after the restart through Chloe Kelly. With five minutes to play, Lauren Hemp volleyed home to put City on the brink of the last four only for Chelsea substitute Niamh Charles to force extra-time with a looping 20-yard volley in the 90th-minute. It only took five minutes of extra-time for Chelsea to retake the lead as Guro Reiten swept home a rebound after Pernille Harder forced a save from Karen Bardsley, and Sophie Ingle added a second with a thunderous 25-yard into the top corner to make the closing minutes comfortable. In the semi-final, Chelsea faced West Ham United who sat 10th in the WSL and were three games into the management of Olli Harder. Pernille Harder opened the scoring four minutes in with Sophie Ingle netting another long range strike to double the lead. West Ham goalkeeper Mackenzie Arnold gifted Harder a second and Bethany England added Chelsea's fourth shortly after as the Blues built what was an unassailable lead within the opening half hour. With Chelsea stepping off the gas, West Ham rallied in the second half with Adriana Leon and Maz Pacheco creating notable chances but it was Fran Kirby who found the scoresheet next with 20 minutes left. Harder eventually got her hat-trick in the 86th-minute as Chelsea ran out 6–0 winners, surpassing the previous biggest winning margin of four goals in a League Cup semi-final.

== Match ==
=== Details ===
14 March 2021
14:30 GMT

Bristol City	0–6	Chelsea
	Report	Kerr 2', 10', 48'; Kirby 28', 38'; Reiten 54'

Vicarage Road, Watford, Hertfordshire
Attendance: 0 (behind closed doors)
Referee: Abigail Byrne

Bristol City	Chelsea

GK	1	(England) Sophie Baggaley
LWB	10	(Belgium) Yana Daniëls
LCB	23	(England) Jemma Purfield
CB	3	(Wales) Gemma Evans (c)		(substituted off) 80'
RCB	29	(England) Kiera Skeels		(substituted off) 85'
RWB	2	(England) Faye Bryson
LCM	17	(England) Emma Bissell		(substituted off) 46'
CM	26	(Australia) Ella Mastrantonio
RCM	8	(England) Carla Humphrey		(substituted off) 66'
FW	9	(England) Ebony Salmon
FW	11	(England) Charlie Wellings
Substitutes:
GK	31	(England) Mia Smith
DF	5	(Northern Ireland) Laura Rafferty	(yellow card) 90+6'	(substituted on) 80'
DF	12	(England) Flo Allen
MF	14	(England) Aimee Palmer	(yellow card) 77'	(substituted on) 66'
MF	18	(England) Maisy Collis
FW	21	(Scotland) Abi Harrison		(substituted on) 46'
DF	25	(England) Naomi Layzell		(substituted on) 85'
MF	28	(England) Ellen Jones
Manager:
(England) Matt Beard (interim)

GK	30	(Germany) Ann-Katrin Berger
LB	25	(Sweden) Jonna Andersson	(substituted off) 46'
LCB	16	(Sweden) Magdalena Eriksson (c)
RCB	4	(England) Millie Bright
RB	18	(Norway) Maren Mjelde	(substituted off) 81'
LW	11	(Norway) Guro Reiten
LCM	8	(Germany) Melanie Leupolz	(substituted off) 46'
RCM	5	(Wales) Sophie Ingle	(substituted off) 46'
RW	17	(Canada) Jessie Fleming
FW	20	(Australia) Sam Kerr	(substituted off) 60'
MF	14	(England) Fran Kirby	(substituted off) 60'
Substitutes:
GK	1	(Sweden) Zećira Mušović
GK	28	(England) Carly Telford
DF	3	(England) Hannah Blundell	(substituted on) 46'
DF	7	(England) Jessica Carter	(substituted on) 60'
MF	10	(South Korea) Ji So-yun
FW	21	(England) Niamh Charles	(substituted on) 60'
FW	22	(Scotland) Erin Cuthbert	(substituted on) 46'
FW	23	(Denmark) Pernille Harder
MF	24	(Jamaica) Drew Spence	(substituted on) 46'
Manager:
(England) Emma Hayes

Player of the match:
Fran Kirby (Chelsea)

Match officials

Assistant referees:
Emily Carney
Jack Clench

Fourth official:
Kirsty Dowle

Match rules

- 90 minutes.
- 30 minutes of extra-time if necessary.
- Penalty shoot-out if scores still level.
- Nine named substitutes.
- Maximum of five substitutions in three stoppages.
