= List of Chelsea F.C. Women seasons =

This is a list of seasons played by Chelsea F.C. Women, the women's football club established in 1992. Since 2004, the club has been affiliated with Chelsea F.C., a men's team in the Premier League.

== Key ==
Key to league competitions:

- Women's Super League (WSL) – England's top women's football league, established in 2011.
- FA Women's Premier League National Division (Prem) – the former first tier of English women's football until the inception of the WSL in 2011.
- FA Women's Premier League Southern Division (Prem South) – the former second tier of English women's football, along with the Northern Division.
- South East Combination League (South East League) – the former third tier of English women's football between 1998 and 2011.
- Greater London Regional League (Greater London) – an amateur competition based in Greater London.

Key to colours and symbols:

1st or W	Winners
2nd or RU	Runners-up
↑	Promoted
↓	Relegated

Key to league record:

- Pos = Final position
- P = Games played
- W = Games won
- D = Games drawn
- L = Games lost
- F = Goals for
- A = Goals against
- GD = Goal difference
- Pts = Points

Key to cup record:

- En-dash (–) = Did not participate
- GS = Group stage
- R1 = First round
- R2 = Second round, etc.
- R32 = Round of 32
- R16 = Round of 16
- QF = Quarter-finals
- SF = Semi-finals
- RU = Runners-up
- W = Winners

== Seasons ==
Results of league and cup competitions by season
Season	League										FA Cup	League Cup (Note: Includes FA Women's National League Cup before 2011, and Women's League Cup since 2011.)	International	
Season	Division	P	W	D	L	F	A	GD	Pts	Pos	FA Cup	League Cup	Competition	Result
1992−93	Greater London D3	16	11	0	5	51	25	26	22	3rd	—	—	—	—
1993–94	↑ Greater London D3	18	16	2	0	81	16	65	34	1st	—	—	—	—
1994–95	↑ Greater London D1	18	13	2	3	84	30	54	28	2nd	—	—	—	—
1995–96	Greater London Prem	18	7	3	8	37	32	5	24	6th	R4	—	—	—
1996–97	Greater London Prem	20	12	5	3	42	23	19	41	3rd	R4	—	—	—
1997–98	Greater London Prem	22	14	4	4	91	35	56	46	3rd	R2	—	—	—
1998–99	South East League	22	17	2	3	93	14	79	53	2nd	R4	—	—	—
1999–2000	↑ South East League	22	22	0	0	133	13	120	66	1st	R3	—	—	—
2000–01	Prem South	22	17	4	1	66	24	42	55	2nd	R5	R1	—	—
2001–02	Prem South	22	13	2	7	59	51	8	41	4th	R4	R2	—	—
2002–03	Prem South	20	10	2	8	33	31	2	32	6th	R4	R1	—	—
2003–04	Prem South	24	13	6	5	60	38	22	45	4th	R5	R1	—	—
2004–05	↑ Prem South	22	16	4	2	72	25	47	52	1st	QF	R1	—	—
2005–06	Prem	18	3	3	12	22	46	−24	12	10th	QF	R1	—	—
2006–07	Prem	22	8	4	10	33	34	−1	28	8th	R5	SF	—	—
2007–08	Prem	22	9	5	8	40	35	5	32	5th	R5	QF	—	—
2008–09	Prem	22	16	2	4	55	23	32	50	3rd	SF	SF	—	—
2009–10	Prem	22	16	1	5	60	27	33	49	3rd	SF	SF	—	—
2011	WSL	14	4	3	7	14	19	−5	15	6th	R5	QF	—	—
2012	WSL	14	5	2	7	20	23	−3	17	6th	RU	GS	—	—
2013	WSL	14	3	1	10	20	27	−7	10	7th	R5	GS	Women's Club Championship	RU
2014	WSL	14	8	2	4	23	16	7	26	2nd	SF	SF	—	—
2015	WSL	14	10	2	2	30	10	10	32	1st	W	QF	Champions League	R16
2016	WSL	16	12	1	3	42	17	25	37	2nd	RU	R1	Champions League	R32
2017	WSL (Note: Shortened interim season as the WSL transitioned from a March–September schedule to a traditional September–May schedule. No WSL Cup was played as part of this season.)	8	6	1	1	32	3	29	19	1st (Note: The FA WSL Spring Series was an interim edition of the FA WSL between the sixth and seventh full seasons.)	SF	—	—	—
2017–18	WSL	18	13	5	0	44	13	31	44	1st	W	SF	Champions League	SF
2018–19	WSL	20	12	6	2	46	14	32	42	3rd	SF	SF	Champions League	SF
2019–20	WSL	15	12	3	0	47	11	36	39	1st	QF	W	—	—
2020–21	WSL	22	18	3	1	69	10	59	57	1st	W	W	Champions League	RU
2021–22	WSL	22	18	2	2	62	11	51	56	1st	W	RU	Champions League	GS
2022–23	WSL	22	19	1	2	66	15	51	58	1st	W	RU	Champions League	SF
2023–24	WSL	22	18	1	3	71	18	53	55	1st	SF	RU	Champions League	SF
2024–25	WSL	22	19	3	0	56	13	43	60	1st	W	W	Champions League	SF
2025–26	WSL	22	15	4	3	44	20	24	49	3rd	SF	W	Champions League	QF
