= List of English women's football transfers winter 2021–22 =

The 2021–22 English women's football winter transfer window ran from 1 January to 2 February 2022. Players without a club could be signed at any time, clubs could sign players on loan dependent on their league's regulations, and clubs could sign a goalkeeper on an emergency loan if they had no registered senior goalkeeper available. This list includes transfers featuring at least one club from either the Women's Super League or the Women's Championship that were completed after the end of the summer 2021 transfer window on 31 August and before the end of the 2021—22 winter window.

== Transfers ==
All players and clubs without a flag are English.

Date	Name	Moving from	Moving to	Ref.
21 November 2021	Eleanor Heeps	Blackburn Rovers	Tottenham Hotspur (end of loan)	
3 December 2021	Katie Startup	Liverpool	Brighton & Hove Albion (end of loan)	
21 December 2021	(Denmark) Sanne Troelsgaard	(Sweden) Rosengård	Reading	
22 December 2021	(Russia) Alsu Abdullina	(Russia) Lokomotiv Moscow	Chelsea	
28 December 2021	(South Korea) Jeon Ga-eul	Reading	Unattached	
1 January 2022	(Sweden) Emma Kullberg	(Sweden) Häcken	Brighton & Hove Albion	
1 January 2022	(Sweden) Julia Zigiotti Olme	(Sweden) Häcken	Brighton & Hove Albion	
4 January 2022	Anna Patten	Arsenal	Aston Villa (loan)	
4 January 2022	Gemma Davison	Aston Villa	Unattached	
4 January 2022	(Republic of Ireland) Naoisha McAloon	(Republic of Ireland) Peamount United	Durham	
4 January 2022	Issy Dean	Blackburn Rovers	Brighouse Town (loan)	
6 January 2022	(Denmark) Emma Snerle	(Denmark) Fortuna Hjørring	West Ham United	
6 January 2022	(United States) Katie Stengel	Unattached	Liverpool	
6 January 2022	Rinsola Babajide	Brighton & Hove Albion	Liverpool (end of loan)	
6 January 2022	Rinsola Babajide	Liverpool	Unattached	
6 January 2022	Jorja Fox	Chelsea	Charlton Athletic (loan)	
7 January 2022	(Netherlands) Iris Achterhof	Sunderland	Unattached	
7 January 2022	Missy Goodwin	Aston Villa	Leicester City	
7 January 2022	Freya Gregory	Aston Villa	Leicester City (loan)	
7 January 2022	Holly Chandler	Coventry United	Bridgwater United	
8 January 2022	Mia Parry	Blackburn Rovers	Huddersfield Town (loan)	
9 January 2022	Eleanor Heeps	Tottenham Hotspur	Blackburn Rovers (loan)	
9 January 2022	Natalia Negri	Arsenal	Charlton Athletic (dual registration)	
10 January 2022	(Finland) Eveliina Summanen	(Sweden) Kristianstads	Tottenham Hotspur	
11 January 2022	Halle Houssein	Arsenal	West Ham United (dual registration)	
14 January 2022	(Sweden) Stina Blackstenius	(Sweden) Häcken	Arsenal	
14 January 2022	(Spain) Amaya Coleman-Evans	Unattached	Blackburn Rovers	
14 January 2022	Charlotte Potts	Sunderland	(Switzerland) Lugano	
14 January 2022	Rio Hardy	Coventry United	Durham	
15 January 2022	(Austria) Laura Wienroither	(Germany) 1899 Hoffenheim	Arsenal	
15 January 2022	(Wales) Georgia Walters	Liverpool	Sheffield United	
15 January 2022	(Wales) Morgan Rogers	Tottenham Hotspur	Watford (dual registration)	
16 January 2022	(Canada) Emily Moore	(Canada) UBC Thunderbirds	West Ham United	
18 January 2022	Natalie Haigh	Aston Villa	Coventry United (loan)	
18 January 2022	(Brazil) Rafaelle Souza	(China) Changchun Zhuoyue	Arsenal	
20 January 2022	(Iceland) Cecilía Rán Rúnarsdóttir	(Sweden) Örebro	Everton (end of loan)	
20 January 2022	(Iceland) Cecilía Rán Rúnarsdóttir	Everton	(Germany) Bayern Munich (loan)	
20 January 2022	(Wales) Maria Francis-Jones	Manchester City	Blackburn Rovers (dual registration)	
22 January 2022	Teyah Goldie	Arsenal	Watford (dual registration)	
22 January 2022	Grace Boyes	Unattached	Sunderland	
22 January 2022	Léa Cordier	Brighton & Hove Albion	Lewes (dual registration)	
22 January 2022	Josie Longhurst	Brighton & Hove Albion	Lewes (dual registration)	
24 January 2022	Carly Telford	Chelsea	(United States) San Diego Wave	
25 January 2022	Jill Scott	Manchester City	Aston Villa (loan)	
26 January 2022	Emily Syme	Aston Villa	Unattached	
26 January 2022	(Scotland) Abbi Grant	Leicester City	(Scotland) Glasgow City (loan)	
27 January 2022	(Norway) Julie Blakstad	(Norway) Rosenborg	Manchester City	
27 January 2022	(Scotland) Rachel Corsie	(United States) Kansas City Current	Aston Villa	
27 January 2022	(Austria) Viktoria Schnaderbeck	Arsenal	Tottenham Hotspur (loan)	
27 January 2022	(Republic of Ireland) Diane Caldwell	Unattached	Manchester United	
27 January 2022	Jade Moore	Unattached	Manchester United	
27 January 2022	(Denmark) Signe Bruun	(France) Lyon	Manchester United (loan)	
27 January 2022	Katie Robinson	Brighton & Hove Albion	Charlton Athletic (loan)	
27 January 2022	Charley Docherty	Sheffield United	Nottingham Forest (dual registration)	
27 January 2022	Tamara Wilcock	Sheffield United	Nottingham Forest (dual registration)	
27 January 2022	Elisha N'Dow	Aston Villa	Coventry United (loan)	
28 January 2022	(Switzerland) Malin Gut	Arsenal	(Switzerland) Grasshopper	
28 January 2022	(Slovenia) Luana Zajmi	Leicester City	Blackburn Rovers (loan)	
28 January 2022	(United States) Erica Cunningham	(Sweden) Norrköping	Blackburn Rovers	
28 January 2022	Shauna Vassell	Unattached	Watford	
28 January 2022	(Wales) Evie Gane	Portsmouth	Watford (dual registration)	
28 January 2022	(Republic of Ireland) Saoirse Noonan	Unattached	Durham	
28 January 2022	Lara Miller	Lewes	Sheffield United	
29 January 2022	Tara Bourne	Sheffield United	Manchester United (end of loan)	
29 January 2022	Tara Bourne	Manchester United	Blackburn Rovers (loan)	
29 January 2022	Gemma Biggadike	Watford	Milton Keynes Dons (loan)	
29 January 2022	Anaisa Harney	Watford	Portsmouth (loan)	
31 January 2022	Katie Kitching	(United States) South Florida Bulls	London City Lionesses	
31 January 2022	Shanade Hopcroft	(United States) Colorado Buffaloes	London City Lionesses	
1 February 2022	(Wales) Esther Morgan	Tottenham Hotspur	Leicester City (loan)	
5 February 2022	Elysia Boddy	Middlesbrough	Leicester City	
19 March 2022	Andria Georgiou	Coventry United	Watford	
