= List of English women's football transfers winter 2020–21 =

The 2020–21 English women's football winter transfer window ran from 1 January to 5 February 2021. Players without a club could be signed at any time, clubs could sign players on loan dependent on their league's regulations, and clubs could sign a goalkeeper on an emergency loan if they had no registered senior goalkeeper available. This list includes transfers featuring at least one club from either the Women's Super League or the Women's Championship that were completed after the end of the summer 2021 transfer window on 31 August and before the end of the 2021—22 winter window.

== Transfers ==
All players and clubs without a flag are English.

Date	Name	Moving from	Moving to	Fee	Ref.
21 December 2020	(Japan) Mana Iwabuchi	(Japan) INAC Kobe Leonessa	Aston Villa	Free	
7 January 2021	Anna Patten	(United States) University of South Carolina	Arsenal	Free	
7 January 2021	(Greece) Veatriki Sarri	Sheffield United	Birmingham City	Free	
8 January 2021	Kirsty Barton	Brighton & Hove Albion	Crystal Palace	Loan	
8 January 2021	(Australia) Emily van Egmond	(United States) Orlando Pride	West Ham	Free	
11 January 2021	Ruby Grant	West Ham	(United States) North Carolina Tar Heels	Free	
14 January 2021	(Sweden) Lotta Ökvist	Manchester United	(Sweden) Kopparbergs/Göteborg FC	Free	
15 January 2021	Destiney Toussaint	Birmingham City	Coventry United	Free	
16 January 2021	(Republic of Ireland) Ruesha Littlejohn	Leicester City	Birmingham City	Free	
16 January 2021	Emily Murphy	Chelsea	Birmingham City	Loan	
16 January 2021	(United States) Abby Dahlkemper	(United States) North Carolina Courage	Manchester City	Free	
20 January 2020	(Spain) Damaris Egurrola	Everton	(France) Lyon	Free	
20 January 2020	(Poland) Wiktoria Kiszkis	West Ham	(Poland) Śląsk Wrocław	Loan	
21 January 2021	Jill Scott	Manchester City	Everton	Loan	
21 January 2021	Abbie McManus	Manchester United	Tottenham Hotspur	Loan	
21 January 2021	Charlotte Fleming	Chelsea	Leicester City	Free	
22 January 2021	(Norway) Maria Thorisdottir	Chelsea	Manchester United	Free	
24 January 2021	Hannah Coan	Everton	Blackburn Rovers	Loan	
27 January 2021	(Switzerland) Alisha Lehmann	West Ham United	Everton	Loan	
28 January 2021	Molly Pike	Everton	Bristol City	Loan	
28 January 2021	Kiera Skeels	Reading	Bristol City	Loan	
28 January 2021	(Australia) Chloe Logarzo	Bristol City	(United States) Kansas City NWSL	Free	
28 January 2021	(Iceland) Dagný Brynjarsdóttir	(Iceland) Selfoss	West Ham United	Free	
29 January 2021	(South Korea) Cho So-hyun	West Ham United	Tottenham Hotspur	Loan	
30 January 2021	Sophie Whitehouse	Tottenham Hotspur	Birmingham City	Free	
1 February 2021	Angie Dunbar-Bonnie	West Ham United	Charlton Athletic	Loan	
1 February 2021	(Poland) Wiktoria Fronc	West Ham United	London City Lionesses	Loan	
1 February 2021	Nina Wilson	(Iceland) Fjarðab/Höttur/Leiknir	London City Lionesses	Free	
3 February 2021	Gracie Pearse	Arsenal	Crystal Palace	Free	
3 February 2021	Gracie Garrad	Arsenal	Crystal Palace	Free	
5 February 2021	(Finland) Emma Koivisto	(Sweden) Kopparbergs/Göteborg FC	Brighton & Hove Albion	Free	
