= Jemma Purfield =

English association football player

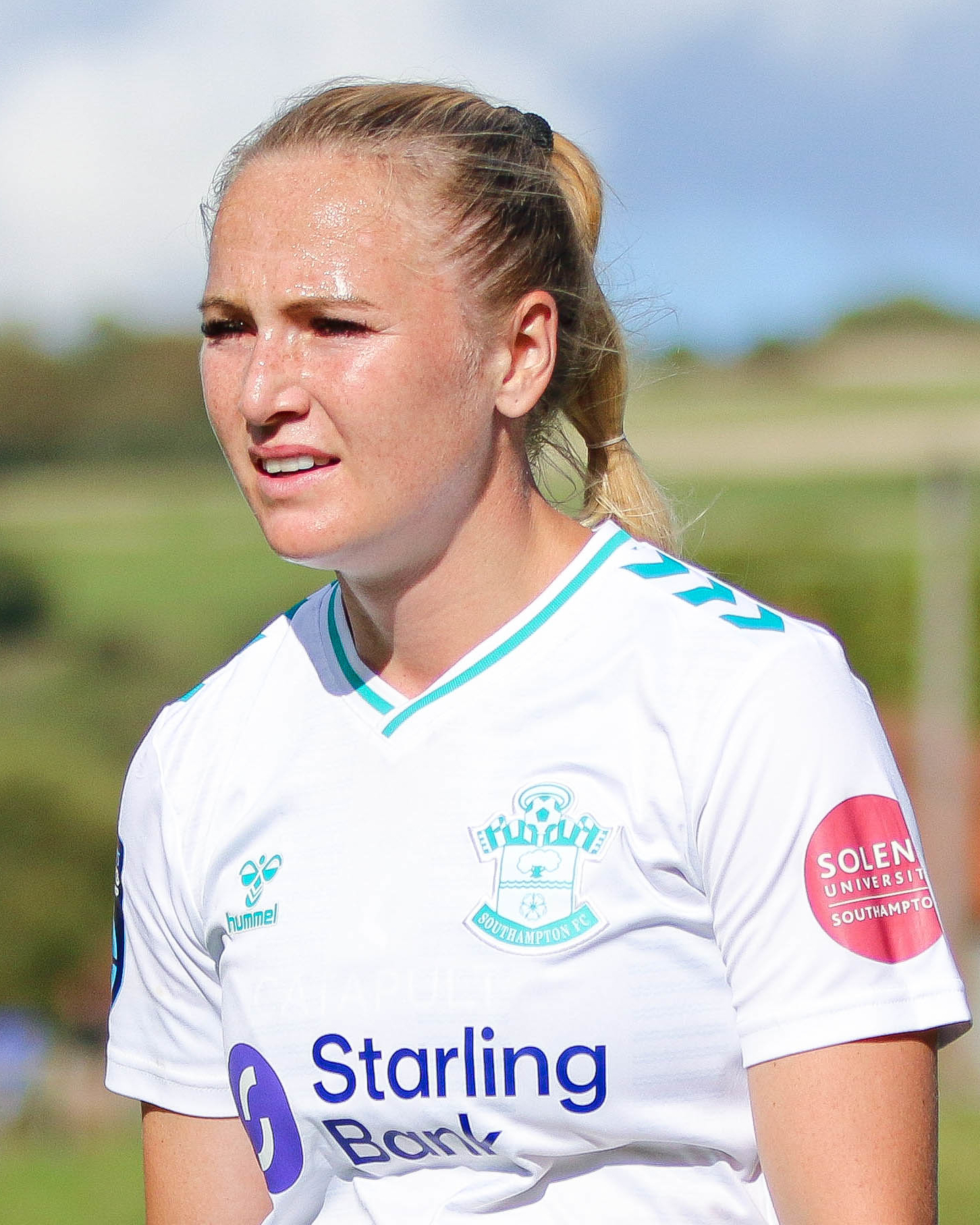
- Purfield with Southampton in 2023

Personal information
- Full name: Jemma Elizabeth Purfield
- Date of birth: 21 February 1997 (age 29)
- Place of birth: Beverley, England
- Height: 1.65 m (5 ft 5 in)
- Position: Full-back

Team information
- Current team: Newcastle United
- Number: 5

Youth career
- 2002–2008: Cottingham Rangers
- 2008–2011: Hull Centre of Excellence
- 2011–2013: North Yorkshire Centre of Excellence

College career
Years	Team	Apps	(Gls)
2015–2016	South Alabama Jaguars	45	(14)
2017–2018	Arizona State Sun Devils	35	(8)

Senior career*
Years	Team	Apps	(Gls)
2013–2014	Doncaster Rovers Belles	3	(0)
2014–2015	Durham	19	(3)
2019–2020	Liverpool	8	(0)
2020–2021	Bristol City	21	(1)
2021–2023	Leicester City	35	(2)
2023–2025	Southampton	12	(1)
2025–	Newcastle United	11	(0)

International career^{‡}
2012	England U15	1+	(1+)
2013	England U17	5+	(0+)
2014	England U19	2+	(0+)
2018	England U23	1	(0)
- * Club domestic league appearances and goals as of 17 December 2023 ‡ National team caps and goals as of 9 June 2018

Jemma Elizabeth Purfield (born 21 February 1997) is an English footballer who plays as a full-back for Women's Championship club Newcastle United.

== Early life ==
Born in Beverley, England, Purfield is the younger of two children to her parents, Rob and Liz. She grew up in Cottingham and began playing football at the age of five, joining the kids academy at her local club, Cottingham Rangers, because her brother James already played for the club. When she was seven years old, Purfield was playing on the under-9s boys team for Cottingham, where she was the only girl. She was identified and, after a trial, selected to the Hull Girls Centre of Excellence. When the Hull centre was closed down by The Football Association (FA) as part of a national restructuring of the women's game, Purfield switched to the North Yorkshire Centre of Excellence.

Purfield attended Cottingham High School and Wyke College, where she played on the football team and was named Sports Personality of the Year during her senior season. She captained the team to the Sports Colleges National Cup Final and scored the FA Goal of the Game in the final. At Wyke, she pursued her A-levels in physical education.

== Career ==
Purfield began her career with Doncaster Rovers Belles, making her senior first team debut on 20 April 2013 as a halftime substitute in a 4–0 WSL defeat to Chelsea. In doing so she became Doncaster's youngest WSL player. Purfield moved to newly founded Durham during the 2014 season, scoring three goals in their inaugural WSL 2 campaign as the team finished 6th.

=== College career ===
In 2015, Purfield moved to the United States on a scholarship to play college soccer, first with the South Alabama Jaguars before transferring to the Arizona State Sun Devils after two seasons. She captained both teams and earned several individual awards, including Sun Belt Conference Freshman of the Year in 2015 and SBC Player of the Year in 2016.

=== Liverpool ===
Purfield declared for the 2019 NWSL College Draft but was not selected. She instead returned to England and signed a contract with FA WSL club Liverpool in January 2019.

=== Bristol City ===
Following Liverpool's relegation, Purfield left upon the expiration of her contract and remained in the WSL after signing a two-year contract with Bristol City. She made 27 appearances for Bristol in all competitions, including in the 2021 FA Women's League Cup Final as Bristol City finished runners-up to Chelsea. Purfield left at the end of the season following the team's relegation.

=== Leicester City ===
In July 2021, Purfield joined Leicester City. In June 2023, she departed the club.

=== Southampton ===
In 2023, Purfield joined Southampton. On 1 July 2025 it was announced that Purfield was leaving the club upon the expiry of her contract, having made 50 appearances in total and served as captain for the 2024-25 season.

=== Newcastle United ===
Purfield joined Newcastle United prior to the 2025–26 Women's Super League 2 season.

== Career statistics ==
As of 17 December 2023

Appearances and goals by club, season and competition
Club	Season	League			Domestic cup (Note: All appearances in the Women's FA Cup)		League cup (Note: All appearances in the FA Women's League Cup)		Total	
Club	Season	Division	Apps	Goals	Apps	Goals	Apps	Goals	Apps	Goals
Doncaster Rovers Belles	2013	FA WSL	2	0	0	0	2	0	4	0
Doncaster Rovers Belles	2014	FA WSL 2	1	0					1+	0+
Doncaster Rovers Belles	Total		3	0	0+	0+	2+	0+	5+	0+
Durham	2014	FA WSL 2	11	3	0	0			11+	3+
Durham	2015	FA WSL 2	8	0		0		0	8+	0
Durham	Total		19	3	0+	0	0+	0+	19+	3+
Liverpool	2018–19	FA WSL	6	0	3	2	0	0	9	2
Liverpool	2019–20	FA WSL	2	0	2	0	2	0	6	0
Liverpool	Total		8	0	5	2	2	0	15	2
Bristol City	2020–21	FA WSL	21	1	1	0	5	1	27	2
Leicester City	2021–22	FA WSL	20	2	2	0	4	0	26	2
Leicester City	2022–23	Women's Super League	15	0	1	0	2	0	18	0
Leicester City	Total		35	2	3	0	6	0	44	2
Southampton	2023–24	Women's Championship	12	1	1	1	2	0	15	2
Southampton	2024-25	Women's Championship	19	0	—	—	2	0	21	0
Southampton	Total		31	1	1	1	4	0	36	2
Newcastle United	2025-26	Women's Super League 2	8	0	2	0	1	0	3	0
Newcastle United	Total		1	0	1	0	1	0	3	0
Career total			118	7	11+	3+	20+	1+	149+	11+
