= Kirsty Dowle =

English football referee (born 1991)

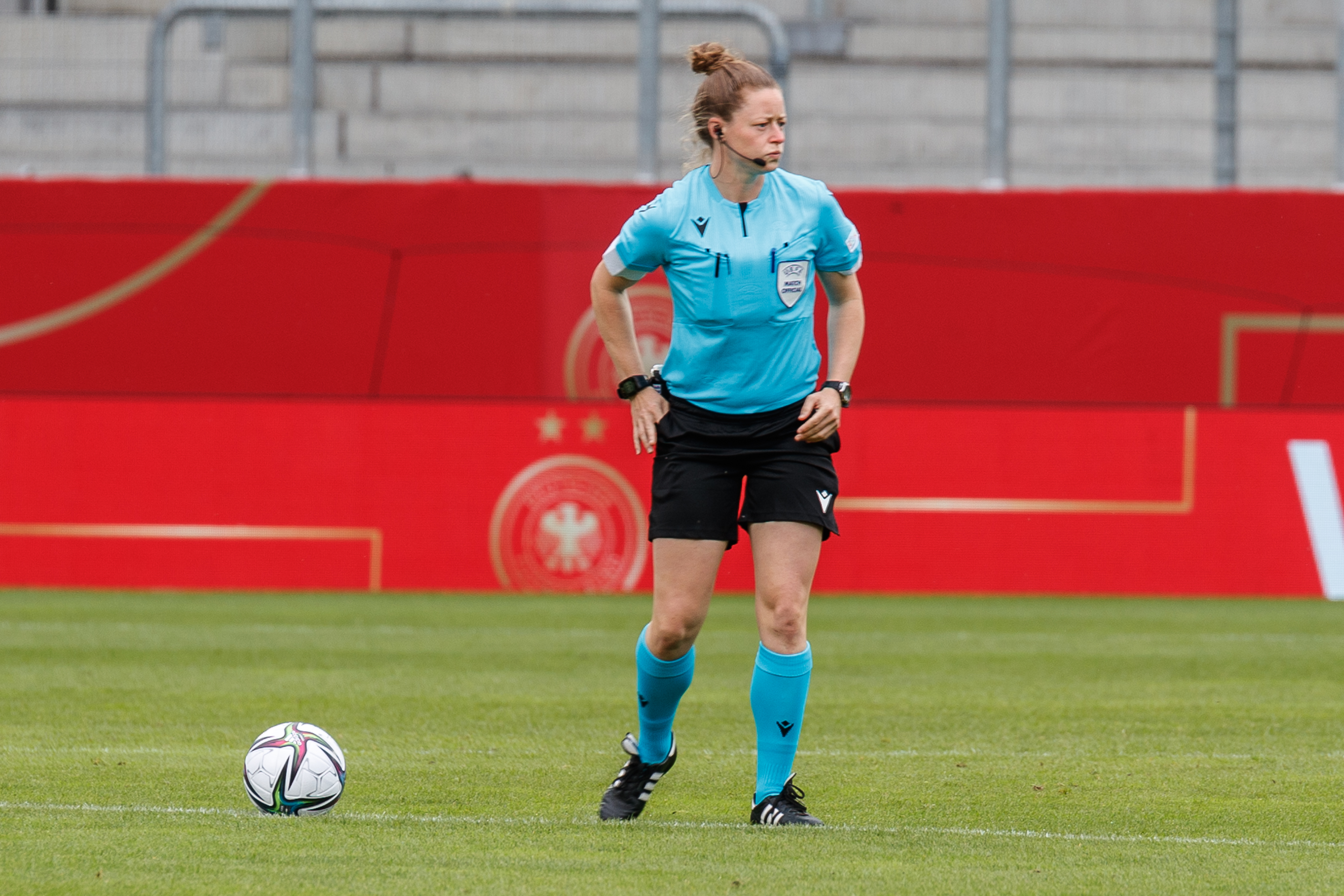
- Dowle in 2021
- Born: 23 August 1991 (age 35)

Domestic
| Years | League | Role |
| 2018– | Premier League U-18 | Referee |
| 2018– | Women's Super League | Referee |
| 2022– | Premier League 2 | Referee |
| 2023– | National League | Referee |
| 2023– | EFL League 2 | Referee |

International
| Years | League | Role |
| 2020– | UEFA | Referee |
| 2022– | FIFA | Referee |

Kirsty Dowle (born 23 August 1991) is an English football referee who officiated at the 2022 Women's FA Cup Final, and the 2023 FA Women's League Cup Final. She officiates in the Women's Super League, and was added to the 2020 FIFA international list of women referees. In 2023, Dowle started refereeing National League and EFL League Two men's games.

During Barnet's home EFL League Two defeat by Shrewsbury Town on 6 September 2025, Dowle was verbally abused by Barnet head coach Dean Brennan. He was sent off, charged by the Football Association, and in February 2026 received a nine-game ban, a £2,000 fine and a mandatory education course.
