= Sophie Baggaley =

English footballer (born 1996)

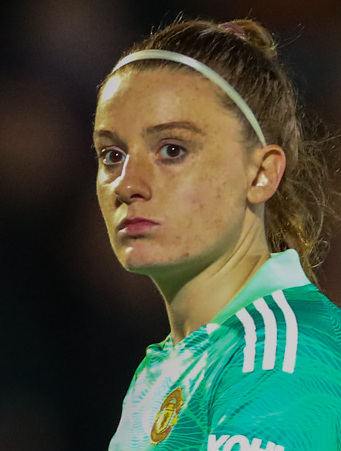
- Baggaley with Manchester United in 2022

Personal information
- Full name: Sophie Baggaley
- Date of birth: 29 November 1996 (age 29)
- Place of birth: Newton, Derbyshire, England
- Height: 1.67 m (5 ft 6 in)
- Position: Goalkeeper

Team information
- Current team: Birmingham City
- Number: 23

Youth career
- Derby County
- 2013–2014: Birmingham City

Senior career*
| Years | Team | Apps | (Gls) |
| 2014–2018 | Birmingham City | 18 | (0) |
| 2017–2018 | → Bristol City (loan) | 17 | (0) |
| 2018–2021 | Bristol City | 55 | (0) |
| 2021–2023 | Manchester United | 0 | (0) |
| 2023–2026 | Brighton & Hove Albion | 36 | (0) |
| 2026– | Birmingham City | 5 | (0) |

International career^{‡}
| 2011 | England U17 | 1 | (0) |
| 2014–2015 | England U19 | 12 | (0) |
| 2016 | England U20 | 2 | (0) |
| 2016–2018 | England U21 | 6 | (0) |
| 2018–2019 | England U23 | 1 | (0) |
| 2025– | England | 0 | (0) |
- * Club domestic league appearances and goals as of 4 October 2026 ‡ National team caps and goals as of 29 November 2025

Sophie Baggaley (born 29 November 1996) is an English professional footballer who plays as a goalkeeper for Birmingham City. She has previously played for Bristol City, Manchester United, and Brighton & Hove Albion and has been capped internationally by England at youth level. In 2019, Baggaley won FA WFA Players' Player of the Year and was named in the PFA Team of the Year.

== Career ==
=== Early career ===
Born in Newton, Derbyshire, Baggaley first became a goalkeeper by chance, volunteering for the position when the boys' team she was playing for found itself short of one for a game. She came through the Derby County Centre of Excellence.

=== Birmingham City ===
Baggaley moved to the Birmingham City academy in June 2013. In 2014, she was promoted to the senior team as a backup to Rebecca Spencer, named as an unused substitute for all 14 WSL matches. She made her senior debut on 1 May 2014 in a 2–1 win over Yeovil Town in the League Cup group stage and made her only other appearance of the season in the same competition against second division Oxford United. During the 2015 season, Baggaley started four WSL games, conceding only one goal to Arsenal, and grew in her role as cup keeper, playing five League Cup games. Following the departure of Spencer to Chelsea in January 2016, Baggaley began the 2016 season as the undisputed starter. However, the arrival of Germany international Ann-Katrin Berger from Paris Saint-Germain in June 2016 meant Baggaley only played in three of the remaining nine WSL fixtures that season.

=== Bristol City ===
Having been appointed Birmingham manager in December 2016, Marc Skinner announced Berger as first choice keeper and encouraged Baggaley to go out on loan to play first-team football. She joined Bristol City on a season-long loan in August 2017 ahead of the incumbent Caitlin Leach and Aimee Watson. She started 17 of 18 WSL matches. At the end of the season, Baggaley won The FA Women's Football Awards Save of the Year for a save against Arsenal's Jordan Nobbs.

She permanently joined Bristol City in the summer of 2018. In September 2018, Baggaley was awarded both the FA WSL Player of the Month and the inaugural FA WSL PFA Fans Player of the Month. She won the award again in January 2019. At the end of the 2018–19 season she won the FA WFA Players' Player of the Year award and was named in the PFA Team of the Year having kept six clean sheets, helping Bristol to 6th place, their best finish since 2013.

The following two seasons, Baggaley led the league in saves with 70 and 95 respectively as Bristol City struggled to cope defensively against the league's top sides. Most notably, Bristol were on the receiving end of a record 11–1 defeat at the hands of Arsenal in December 2019. During the 2020–21 season, Bristol were beaten 9–0 by Chelsea and 8–1 by Manchester City. However, Bristol reached the final of the 2020–21 League Cup for the first time in their history, but were beaten 6–0 by Chelsea. Baggaley left Bristol City in July 2021 after their relegation to the Championship.

=== Manchester United ===
On 23 July 2021, Baggaley signed with Manchester United on a two-year contract with an additional option year. Having started the season as a backup to Mary Earps in the league, Baggaley made her club debut on 14 October in a 2–2 away draw with Championship side Durham in the 2021–22 League Cup group stage opener. Manchester United took the bonus point with a 5–3 penalty shootout victory.

=== Brighton & Hove Albion ===
On 14 September 2023, Baggaley signed with Brighton & Hove Albion. On 2 June 2026, it was announced that Baggaley would be leaving Brighton at the end of June.

=== Return to Birmingham City ===
On 24 July 2026, it was announced that Baggaley had rejoined her former academy team Birmingham City. On returning to the club she began her career at, Baggaley said "you always have a soft spot for it."

== International career ==
Baggaley has played for the England team at every age grouping up to under 23 level. In October 2016, Baggaley was called up to the senior England national team for the first time for a friendly against Spain but was an unused substitute behind Karen Bardsley and Mary Earps. Having not been named to the next three England squads, Baggaley was recalled in April 2017 for friendlies against Italy and Austria but was again unused behind veteran Siobhan Chamberlain. Much discussion was made of the lack of chances Baggaley had for England, with Phil Neville preferring the likes of older veterans Bardsley, Earps, Chamberlain, and Carly Telford, despite some resigned to backup roles at club level. By 2019, younger goalkeepers Ellie Roebuck, Sandy MacIver, and Hannah Hampton had all also claimed starting jobs at WSL clubs and entered the England rotation ahead of Baggaley.

On 6 June 2025, Baggaley was named as a standby player for UEFA Euro 2025.

On 1 June 2026, Baggaley was called up for the England squad to face Spain and Ukraine for the 2027 FIFA Women's World Cup qualifiers as a replacement for Khiara Keating.

== Personal life ==
Baggaley attended Tibshelf Community School from 2009 to 2013 and later Solihull Sixth Form College, where she attained As and A*s in her A-Levels, before enrolling at the University of Birmingham to study physiotherapy. In 2019, she became an ambassador for the sports bra firm ShockAbsorber.

== Career statistics ==
=== Club ===
As of match played 4 October 2026

Appearances and goals by club, season and competition
| Club | Season | League | | | FA Cup (Note: Includes the Women's FA Cup) | | League Cup (Note: Includes the FA Women's League Cup) | | Continental (Note: Includes the UEFA Women's Champions League) | | Total | |
| Club | Season | Division | Apps | Goals | Apps | Goals | Apps | Goals | Apps | Goals | Apps | Goals |
|---|---|---|---|---|---|---|---|---|---|---|---|---|
| Birmingham City | 2014 | FA WSL | 0 | 0 | 0 | 0 | 2 | 0 | 0 | 0 | 2 | 0 |
| Birmingham City | 2015 | FA WSL | 4 | 0 | 0 | 0 | 5 | 0 | — | | 9 | 0 |
| Birmingham City | 2016 | FA WSL | 10 | 0 | 1 | 0 | 1 | 0 | — | | 12 | 0 |
| Birmingham City | 2017 | FA WSL | 3 | 0 | — | | 0 | 0 | — | | 3 | 0 |
| Birmingham City | Total | | 17 | 0 | 1 | 0 | 8 | 0 | 0 | 0 | 26 | 0 |
| Bristol City (loan) | 2017–18 | FA WSL | 17 | 0 | 0 | 0 | 1 | 0 | — | | 18 | 0 |
| Bristol City | 2018–19 | FA WSL | 20 | 0 | 1 | 0 | 4 | 0 | — | | 25 | 0 |
| Bristol City | 2019–20 | FA WSL | 14 | 0 | 2 | 0 | 4 | 0 | — | | 20 | 0 |
| Bristol City | 2020–21 | FA WSL | 21 | 0 | 1 | 0 | 5 | 0 | — | | 27 | 0 |
| Bristol City | Total | | 72 | 0 | 4 | 0 | 14 | 0 | — | | 90 | 0 |
| Manchester United | 2021–22 | WSL | 0 | 0 | 0 | 0 | 6 | 0 | — | | 6 | 0 |
| Manchester United | 2022–23 | WSL | 0 | 0 | 0 | 0 | 4 | 0 | — | | 4 | 0 |
| Manchester United | Total | | 0 | 0 | 0 | 0 | 10 | 0 | — | | 10 | 0 |
| Brighton & Hove Albion | 2023–24 | WSL | 19 | 0 | 3 | 0 | 1 | 0 | — | | 23 | 0 |
| Brighton & Hove Albion | 2024–25 | WSL | 14 | 0 | 0 | 0 | 0 | 0 | — | | 14 | 0 |
| Brighton & Hove Albion | 2025–26 | WSL | 3 | 0 | 1 | 0 | 4 | 0 | — | | 8 | 0 |
| Brighton & Hove Albion | Total | | 36 | 0 | 4 | 0 | 5 | 0 | — | | 45 | 0 |
| Birmingham City | 2026–27 | WSL | 5 | 0 | 0 | 0 | 0 | 0 | — | | 5 | 0 |
| Career total | | | 130 | 0 | 9 | 0 | 37 | 0 | 0 | 0 | 176 | 0 |

== Honours ==
Birmingham City

- FA Women's League Cup runner-up: 2016
- Women's FA Cup runner-up: 2017

Bristol City

- FA Women's League Cup runner-up: 2021

Manchester United

- Women's FA Cup runner-up: 2022–23

Individual

- WSL Player of the Month: September 2018
- WSL PFA Team of the Year: 2018–19
- FA Women's Football Awards WSL Players' Player of the Year: 2018–19
- Brighton & Hove Albion Player of the Season: 2023-24
