= 2011 Chelsea L.F.C. season =

Chelsea
2011 season
- Manager: Matt Beard
- Stadium: Imperial Fields
- FA WSL: 6th
- FA Women's Cup: Fifth round
- FA WSL Continental Cup: Quarter-finals
- Top goalscorer: Danielle Buet (3)
- Highest home attendance: 2,510 (13 Apr v ARS)
- Lowest home attendance: 95 (18 Aug v BRI)
- Biggest win: DON 1–4 CHE (24 Apr)
- Biggest defeat: ARS 3–0 CHE (28 July)
Home colours	Away colours

Chelsea L.F.C.'s 2011 season was the club's first season in the FA Women's Super League (FA WSL) and sixth in the top flight of English women's football, in its 19th year.

== Review and events ==
The semi-professional FA WSL debuted after two years of planning with Chelsea facing Arsenal at its home ground of Imperial Fields, a seventh-tier men's club ground, on 13 April 2011. The match was broadcast live on ESPN. out of the 16 that applied. The pre-match featured mascots, amusements, a performance by the band Parade, and a brief fight among spectators within the stands. While the new league's summer schedule was meant to avoid pitch quality concerns encountered by the incumbent winter-schedule FA Women's Premier League, the dry Imperial Fields pitch caused problems during the debut. The match was also the first domestic league action for players since the end of the 2009–10 FA Women's Premier League season 11 months prior. The opening-match attendance of 2,510 was the season's and league's best, and broke the club's all-time record.

=== Signings ===
On 9 January 2011, Chelsea signed New Zealand captain Hayley Moorwood. The foreign signing was one of several in the league that raised concerns from other clubs' managers that the acquisitions could come at the expense of developing domestic players.

== Match results ==
=== FA Women's Super League ===
13 April 2011 1	Chelsea	0–1	Arsenal	Morden
17:30		CHE Report; WSL report FA Report; BBC report Guardian report	Flaherty 37' v	Stadium: Imperial Fields; Attendance: 2,510; Referee: Saša Ihringová

21 April 2011 2	Chelsea	1–1	Lincoln Ladies	Morden
19:45	Perry 46'	CHE report WSL report FA Report	Cantrell 35'	Stadium: Imperial Fields; Attendance: 273; Referee: T.J. Robinson

24 April 2011 3	Doncaster Rovers Belles	1–4	Chelsea	Doncaster
14:00	Exley 24'	CHE report WSL report FA report	Buet 40'; Bird 48'; Hincks 60' v; Plewa 86'	Stadium: Keepmoat Stadium; Attendance: 578; Referee: Shaun Hudson

1 May 2011 4	Liverpool	1–2	Chelsea	Skelmersdale
14:00	Jones 44'	CHE report WSL Report; FA report	Buet 10' (yellow card); Spence 36'	Stadium: West Lancashire College Stadium; Attendance: 406; Referee: Natalie Walker

4 May 2011 5	Bristol Academy	0–0	Chelsea	Bristol
19:45		CHE report WSL report FA report		Stadium: Stoke Gifford Stadium; Attendance: 371; Referee: Rob Ellis

8 May 2011 6	Chelsea	1–1	Birmingham City	Morden
	Champ (yellow card) 37'; Rafferty 71'	CHE report WSL report	Harrop 81'	Stadium: Imperial Fields; Attendance: 441; Referee: Ade Mead

12 May 2011 7	Lincoln Ladies	0–1	Chelsea	Lincoln
19:45		CHE report WSL report	Buet 59'; Champ (yellow card) 83'	Stadium: Sincil Bank; Attendance: 493; Referee: Neil Pratt

24 July 2011 8	Everton	2–0	Chelsea	Merseyside
	Duggan 33'; Hinnigan 53'	CHE report WSL report		Stadium: The Arriva Stadium; Attendance: 503; Referee: Saša Ihringová

28 July 2011 9	Arsenal	3–0	Chelsea	Borehamwood
19:45	Yankey 66'; Carter 73', 81'	CHE report WSL report FA report	Buet (yellow card) 49'; Champ (yellow card) 75'	Stadium: Meadow Park; Attendance: 608; Referee: Ade Mead

31 July 2011 10	Chelsea	2–1	Doncaster Rovers Belles	Morden
14:00	Perry 11'; Hincks 43'	CHE report WSL report	Lipka 45'; Cox (yellow card)	Stadium: Imperial Fields; Attendance: 300; Referee: Shaun Hudson

7 August 2011 11	Chelsea	0–1	Liverpool	Morden
		CHE report WSL report	24' C. Jones	Stadium: Imperial Fields; Attendance: 297; Referee: John Burridge

14 August 2011 12	Birmingham City	3–2	Chelsea	Stratford upon Avon
14:00	Williams 24', 90'; Potter 81'	CHE report WSL report Box	Lander 56'; Moorwood 62'	Stadium: The DCS Stadium; Attendance: 413

18 August 2011 13	Chelsea	0–1	Bristol Academy	Morden
	Longhurst (yellow card); Champ (yellow card)	CHE report WSL report	Bleazard 25'; Matthews (yellow card)	Stadium: Imperial Fields; Attendance: 95

28 August 2011 14	Chelsea	1–3	Everton	Morden
14:00	Lander 1'	CHE report WSL report	Harries 29'; F. Williams 47'; Dowie 63'	Stadium: Imperial Fields; Attendance: 369

==== League table ====
Pos	Team	Pld	W	D	L	GF	GA	GD	Pts
4	Lincoln	14	6	3	5	18	16	+2	21
5	Bristol Academy	14	4	4	6	14	20	−6	16
6	Chelsea	14	4	3	7	14	19	−5	15
7	Doncaster Rovers Belles	14	2	3	9	9	26	−17	9
8	Liverpool	14	1	4	9	10	26	−16	7

Source: FA WSL results
Rules for classification: 1) Points; 2) Goal difference; 3) Number of goals scored

=== Results summary ===
Overall								Home						Away					
Pld	W	D	L	GF	GA	GD	Pts	W	D	L	GF	GA	GD	W	D	L	GF	GA	GD
14	4	3	7	14	19	−5	15	1	2	4	5	9	−4	3	1	3	9	10	−1

Last updated: 28 August 2011.
Source: FA WSL results

=== FA Women's Cup ===
Chelsea entered the competition in the fifth round as an FA WSL team. They were knocked out of the competition after being defeated 1–0 by the Belles.

13 March 2011 5th round	Chelsea	0–1	Doncaster Rovers Belles	Morden
		Report	Exley 21'	Stadium: Imperial Fields

=== FA WSL Continental Cup ===
Chelsea were drawn with Everton in the quarter-finals and lost the match 4–0.

4 September 2011 1/4 Finals	Chelsea	0–4	Everton	Morden
14:00		CHE report EVE report BBC report WSU report	Harries 3' (Dowie); Dowie 30'; Buet 65' (o.g.); Hinnigan 69' (Dowie)	Stadium: Imperial Fields

== Squad statistics ==
As of match played 4 September 2011

No.	Pos	Nat	Player	Total		WSL		FA Cup		League Cup	
No.	Pos	Nat	Player	Apps	Goals	Apps	Goals	Apps	Goals	Apps	Goals
1	GK	(England) ENG	Carly Telford	12	0	12	0	0	0	0	0
2	MF	(England) ENG	Lara Fay	7	0	6	0	1	0	0	0
3	DF	(Republic of Ireland) IRL	Sophie Perry	15	2	13	2	1	0	1	0
4	MF	(England) ENG	Drew Spence	11	1	9	1	1	0	1	0
5	DF	(England) ENG	Gemma Bonner	16	0	14	0	1	0	1	0
6	DF	(England) ENG	Naomi Cole	5	0	5	0	0	0	0	0
7	DF	(England) ENG	Leanne Champ	15	0	13	0	1	0	1	0
8	MF	(England) ENG	Danielle Buet	15	3	13	3	1	0	1	0
9	MF	(England) ENG	Danielle Bird	6	1	6	1	0	0	0	0
10	FW	(Wales) WAL	Helen Lander	16	2	14	2	1	0	1	0
11	MF	(England) ENG	Claire Rafferty	10	1	9	1	1	0	0	0
12	MF	(New Zealand) NZL	Hayley Moorwood	15	1	13	1	1	0	1	0
13	DF	(England) ENG	Shelby Hills	5	0	4	0	1	0	0	0
14	DF	(Wales) WAL	Kylie Davies	15	0	13	0	1	0	1	0
15	FW	(Wales) WAL	Emma Plewa	9	1	8	1	1	0	0	0
16	GK	(England) ENG	Sarah Quantrill	5	0	3	0	1	0	1	0
17	MF	(England) ENG	Laura Coombs	7	0	6	0	0	0	1	0
18	FW	(England) ENG	Kate Longhurst	6	0	5	0	0	0	1	0
19	DF	(England) ENG	Rebecca Jane	11	0	9	0	1	0	1	0
20	FW	(England) ENG	Ashlee Hincks	15	2	13	2	1	0	1	0
30	GK	(England) ENG	Francesca Gibbs	0	0	0	0	0	0	0	0
