= Ellen Jones (footballer) =

Association footballer

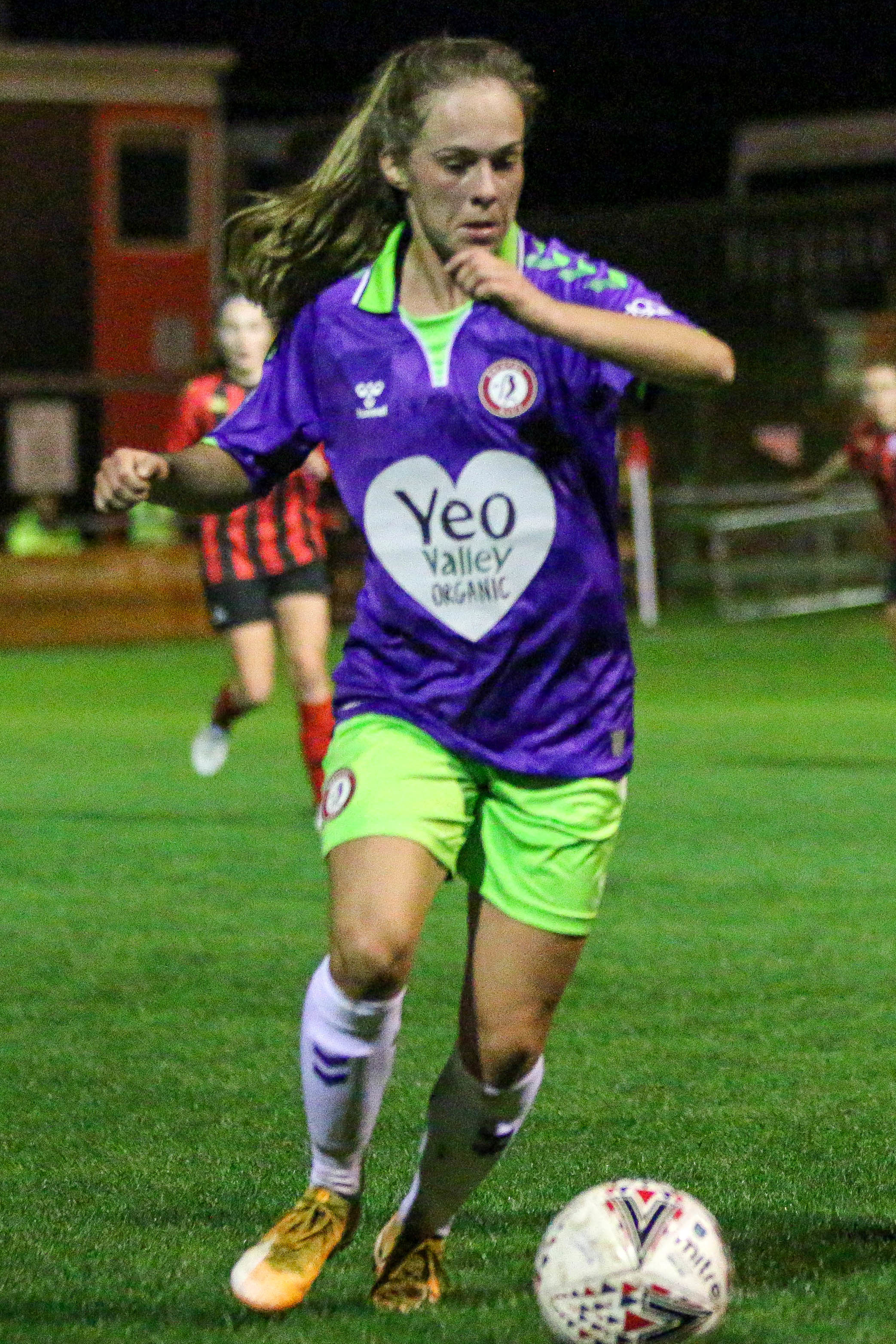
- Jones playing for Bristol City in 2020

Personal information
- Full name: Ellen Jones
- Date of birth: 10 November 2002 (age 23)
- Place of birth: Oxford, England
- Position: Winger

Team information
- Current team: Wolverhampton Wanderers
- Number: 21

College career
Years	Team	Apps	(Gls)
2021–2022	Colorado Buffaloes	19	(1)

Senior career*
Years	Team	Apps	(Gls)
2020–2021	Bristol City	5	(0)
2022–2023	Leicester City	2	(0)
2023	→ Coventry United (loan)	10	(2)
2023–2026	Sunderland	54	(6)
2026–	Wolverhampton Wanderers	0	(0)

International career^{‡}
2017	Wales U15		
2017	Wales U17		
2018–2019	England U17	8	(0)
- * Club domestic league appearances and goals as of 30 May 2025 ‡ National team caps and goals as of 30 May 2025

Ellen Jones (born 10 November 2002) is a professional footballer who plays as a midfielder for Women's Super League 2 club Wolverhampton Wanderers.

== Club career ==
=== Bristol City ===
Jones made her first team debut in the FA Women's League Cup as a 66th-minute substitute in a 4–2 win over Crystal Palace on 5 November 2020. She made her first appearance in the FA Women's Super League against Manchester City on 7 November 2020, again as a substitute, when she replaced Emma Bissell after 68 minutes.

=== Leicester City ===
On 8 September 2022, Jones was announced at Leicester. She made her debut in the FA Women's League Cup against Blackburn Rovers on 2 October 2022.

=== Loan to Coventry United ===
In January 2023, Jones was loaned to FA Women's Championship club Coventry United. She made her league debut against Bristol City on 15 January 2023.

=== Sunderland ===
On 1 August 2023, Jones was announced at Sunderland after a successful trial. She made her league debut against London City Lionesses on 27 August 2023. Jones scored her first league goal against Reading on 15 October 2023, scoring in the 44th minute.

=== Wolverhampton Wanderers ===
On 29 July 2026, Jones joined Wolverhampton Wanderers.

== International career ==
Jones has represented England U17 eight times.

== Career statistics ==
As of match played 17 March 2021.

Appearances and goals by club, season and competition
Club	Season	League			National Cup		League Cup		Total	
Club	Season	Division	Apps	Goals	Apps	Goals	Apps	Goals	Apps	Goals
Bristol City	2020–21	WSL	5	0	0	0	3	0	8	0
Leicester City	2022-23	WSL	0	0	0	0	2	0	2	0
Coventry United (Loan)	2022-23	Women's Championship	10	0	1	0	2	0	13	0
Sunderland	2023-24	Women's Championship	17	2	1	0	4	0	22	2
Sunderland	2024-25	Women's Championship	12	3	4	3	2	0	18	6
Sunderland	Total		29	5	5	3	6	0	40	8
Career total			44	5	6	3	13	0	63	8
