= 2023 FA Women's League Cup final =

- Event: 2022–23 FA Women's League Cup
Arsenal	Chelsea
3	1
- Date: 5 March 2023
- Venue: Selhurst Park, Selhurst
- Player of the Match: Kim Little (Arsenal)
- Referee: Kirsty Dowle
- Attendance: 19,010

The 2023 FA Women's League Cup final was the twelfth final of the FA Women's League Cup, England's secondary cup competition for women's football teams and its primary league cup tournament. It took place on 5 March 2023 at Selhurst Park, and was contested by Chelsea and Arsenal.

Chelsea made their fourth consecutive (and fourth overall) appearance in a League Cup final, having lost the previous edition. Five-time winners Arsenal contested their ninth League Cup final and their first since losing in 2020. It was the second time the teams met in a League Cup final.

Arsenal won the match 3–1 and clinched their sixth title.

== Route to the final ==
=== Arsenal ===
Round	Opposition	Score
GS	Bye	
QF	Aston Villa (H)	3–0
SF	Manchester City (A)	1–0 (a.e.t.)
Key: (H) = Home; (A) = Away

Arsenal also entered the competition in the quarter-finals due to their participation in the UEFA Women's Champions League. They started off their journey by beating Aston Villa 3–0 in the quarter-final. Frida Maanum scored two goals and also provided an assist to Caitlin Foord.

The Gunners then took Manchester City to extra time in the semi-final. Stina Blackstenius pounced on fellow substitute Lina Hurtig's 93rd-minute cross, scoring the only goal of the game.

=== Chelsea ===
Round	Opposition	Score
GS	Bye	
QF	Tottenham Hotspur (A)	3–1
SF	West Ham United (A)	7–0
Key: (H) = Home; (A) = Away

Chelsea entered the competition in the quarter-finals due to their participation in the UEFA Women's Champions League.

The first of their two matches was a 3–1 win over Tottenham Hotspur. Chelsea took the lead seven minutes before half-time when Erin Cuthbert's shot was turned in by Sam Kerr from close range. Substitute Fran Kirby flicked in Chelsea's second after the break when she was teed up by Lauren James. Kerr made it 3–0 with a dinked finish late on, before Drew Spence claimed a consolation for Spurs.

Chelsea then went on to West Ham United, thrashing them 7–0 in the semi-final. They were 3–0 up after just 22 minutes, with a brace by Kerr and a goal by Kirby. In the stoppage time of the first half, Kerr netted her hat-trick. After James struck a fifth goal, Kerr was again left unmarked to net her fourth before Guro Reiten netted the Blues seventh with a deflected effort.

== Match ==
=== Details ===
5 March 2023
15:00 GMT

Arsenal	3–1	Chelsea
Blackstenius 16'; Little 24' (pen.); Charles 45+5' (o.g.)	Report	Kerr 2'

Selhurst Park, Selhurst
Attendance: 19,010
Referee: Kirsty Dowle

Arsenal	Chelsea

GK	1	(Austria) Manuela Zinsberger
LB	7	(Australia) Steph Catley
LCB	2	(Brazil) Rafaelle Souza
RCB	6	(England) Leah Williamson
RB	16	(Switzerland) Noelle Maritz		(substituted off) 70'
LCM	12	(Norway) Frida Maanum
CM	10	(Scotland) Kim Little (c)
RCM	13	(Switzerland) Lia Wälti
LW	19	(Australia) Caitlin Foord	(yellow card) 90+6'
FW	25	(Sweden) Stina Blackstenius		(substituted off) 87'
RW	15	(Republic of Ireland) Katie McCabe	(yellow card) 32'	(substituted off) 57'
Substitutes:
GK	18	(United States) Kaylan Marckese
CB	3	(England) Lotte Wubben-Moy
CB	5	(Scotland) Jen Beattie		(substituted on) 87'
FW	17	(Sweden) Lina Hurtig
MF	21	(Netherlands) Victoria Pelova		(substituted on) 57'
MF	22	(Denmark) Kathrine Møller Kühl
RB	26	(Austria) Laura Wienroither		(substituted on) 70'
Manager:
(Sweden) Jonas Eidevall

GK	30	(Germany) Ann-Katrin Berger
LB	21	(England) Niamh Charles		(substituted off) 45'
LCB	16	(Sweden) Magdalena Eriksson		(substituted off) 77'
RCB	4	(England) Millie Bright (c)
RB	15	(France) Ève Périsset
LCM	22	(Scotland) Erin Cuthbert
RCM	5	(Wales) Sophie Ingle		(substituted off) 63'
LW	11	(Norway) Guro Reiten
CAM	28	(Serbia) Jelena Čanković		(substituted off) 40'
RW	10	(England) Lauren James	(yellow card) 83'
CF	20	(Australia) Sam Kerr
Substitutes:
GK	1	(Sweden) Zećira Mušović
DF	7	(England) Jess Carter
MF	8	(Germany) Melanie Leupolz	(yellow card) 51'	(substituted on) 45'
DF	18	(Norway) Maren Mjelde
MF	17	(Canada) Jessie Fleming		(substituted on) 77'
MF	19	(Sweden) Johanna Rytting Kaneryd		(substituted on) 63'
DF	26	(Canada) Kadeisha Buchanan		(substituted on) 40'
DF	27	(Russia) Alsu Abdullina
Manager:
(England) Emma Hayes

Player of the match:
Kim Little (Arsenal)

Assistant referees:
Ceri Williams
Sophie Dennington

Fourth official:
Lou Saunders

Reserve assistant referee:
Abby Dearden

Match rules

- 90 minutes.
- 30 minutes of extra-time if necessary.
- Penalty shoot-out if scores still level.
- Nine named substitutes.
- Maximum of five substitutions in three stoppages.
