= Megan Wynne =

Wales international footballer (b. 1993)

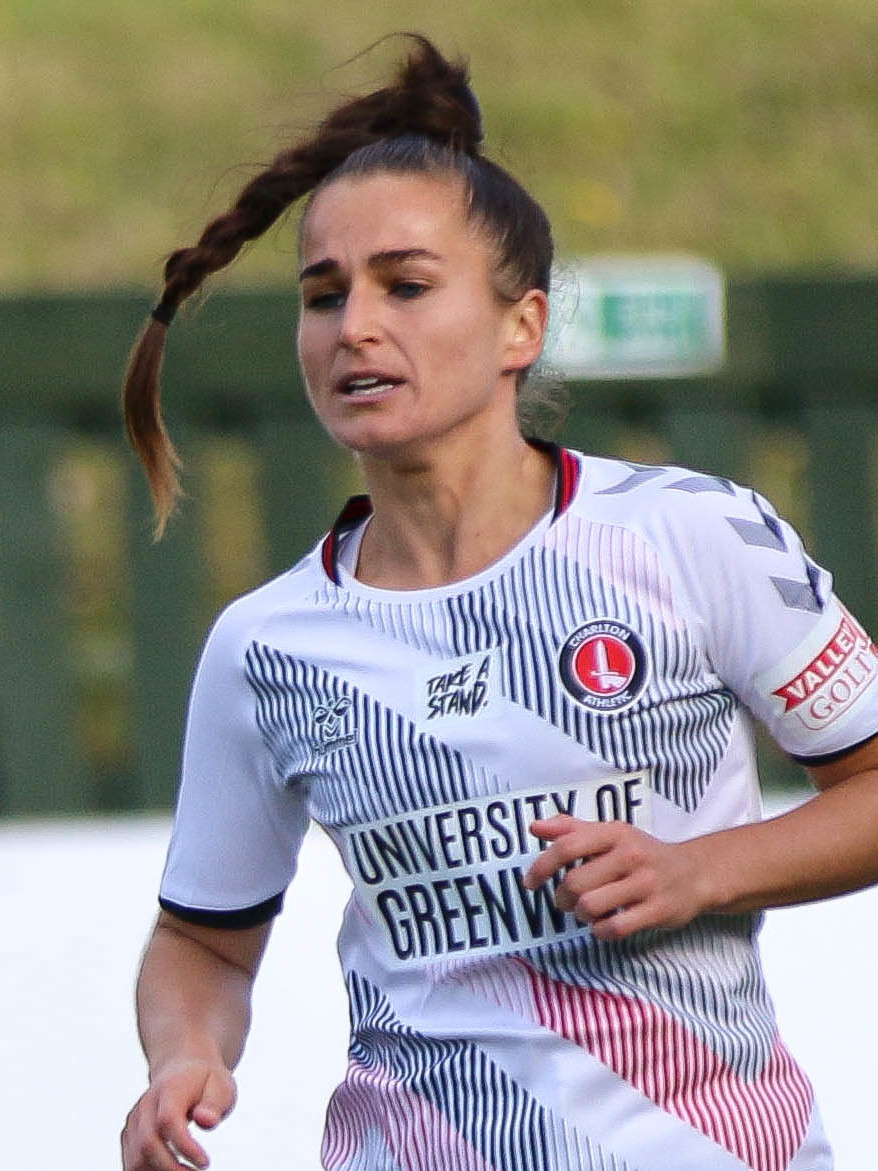
- Wynne with Charlton in October 2021

Personal information
- Full name: Megan Rose Wynne
- Date of birth: 21 January 1993 (age 33)
- Place of birth: Welwyn Garden City, England
- Height: 5 ft 3 in (1.60 m)
- Position: Winger

Team information
- Current team: Perth Glory
- Number: 7

Youth career
- 2001–2011: Watford
- 2008: Bedwell Rangers

Senior career*
Years	Team	Apps	(Gls)
2011–2016	Watford	50	(2)
2013	→ Tottenham Hotspur (loan)		
2016	→ Tottenham Hotspur (loan)	4	
2016–2018	Millwall	18	(1)
2018–2021	Tottenham Hotspur	22	(0)
2020	→ Bristol City (loan)	3	(0)
2021–2022	Charlton Athletic	10	(0)
2022–2024	Southampton	13	(0)
2024–	Perth Glory	20	(0)

International career^{‡}
	Wales U17	9	(1)
2010–2012	Wales U19	12	(3)
2011–	Wales	19	(1)
- * Club domestic league appearances and goals as of 18 January 2020 ‡ National team caps and goals as of 19 September 2023

Megan Rose Wynne (/wɪn/; born 21 January 1993) is a professional footballer who plays as a midfielder for A-League Women team Perth Glory and the Wales national team.

She began her career as a youth player with Watford, spending more than ten years with the club and progressing to the club's senior side. She signed for Millwall in 2016 before joining Tottenham in 2018.

== Early life ==
Wynne was born in Welwyn Garden City to Gareth and Kim Wynne and grew up in nearby St Albans. She has two older brothers, Rhys and Lewis.

== Club career ==
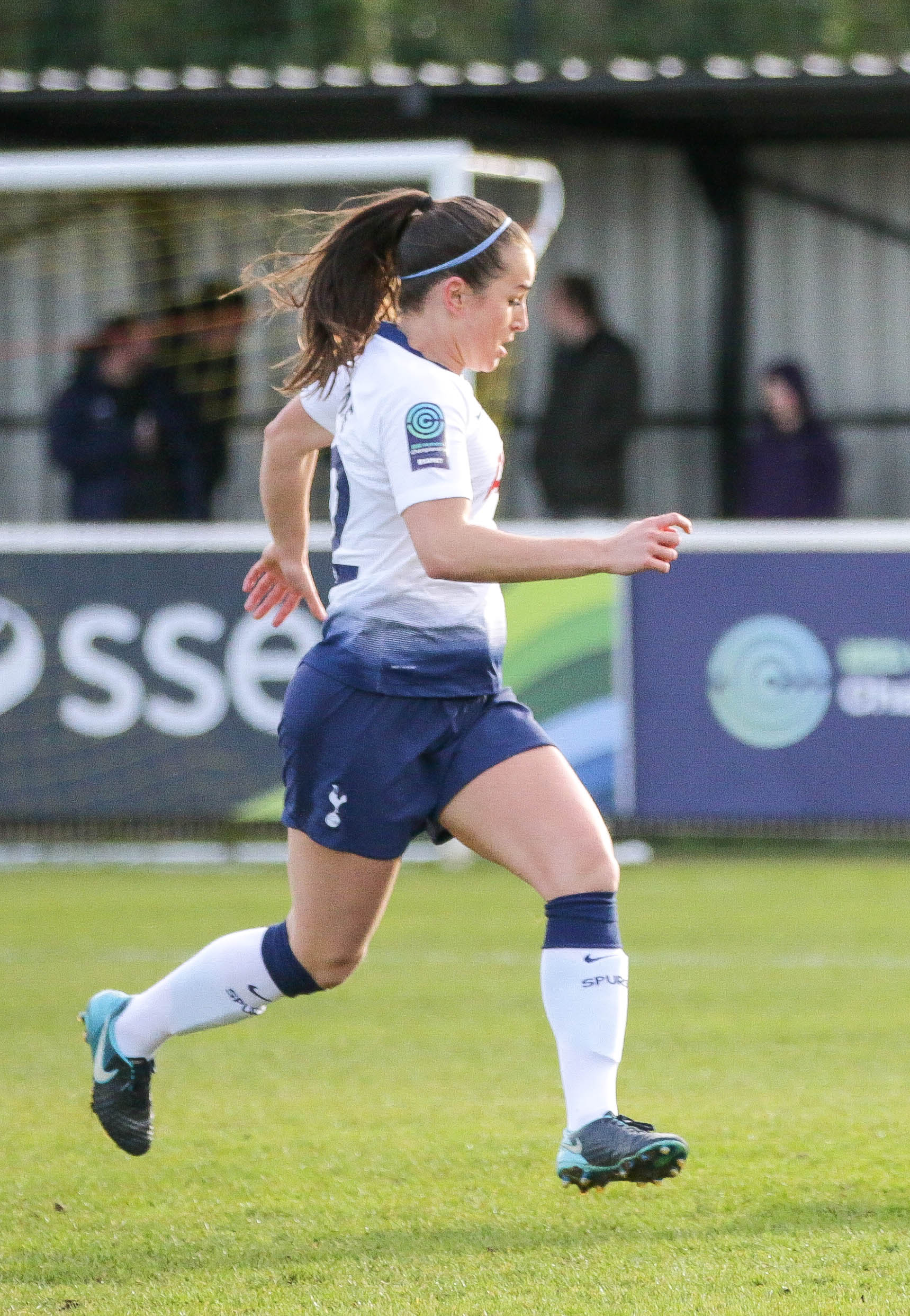
Wynne playing for Tottenham in January 2019

Wynne began playing football at a young age alongside her father and siblings. At the age of eight, she attended a football camp organised by Watford and impressed enough to be offered a six-week trial with the club. After featuring in trial matches, she was offered a place in the club's youth academy and progressed through the youth system before graduating to the club's senior side. Wynne also played youth football for Bedwell Rangers as the side represented the Hertfordshire County Football Association at under-16 level in the regional Tesco Cup in 2008. She was named Player of the Tournament after scoring the winning goal in the regional South England final. The side went on to claim the English title before losing the UK final to Scottish side Hibernian with Wynne again being named Player of the Tournament.

Wynne travelled to the United States in 2012 to play for the East Tennessee State Buccaneers during the English summer break. She also spent two periods on loan with Tottenham Hotspur in 2013 and 2016. In 2014, she was named Watford's Player of the Season and, the following year, was appointed captain of the side, replacing Lauren Davey.

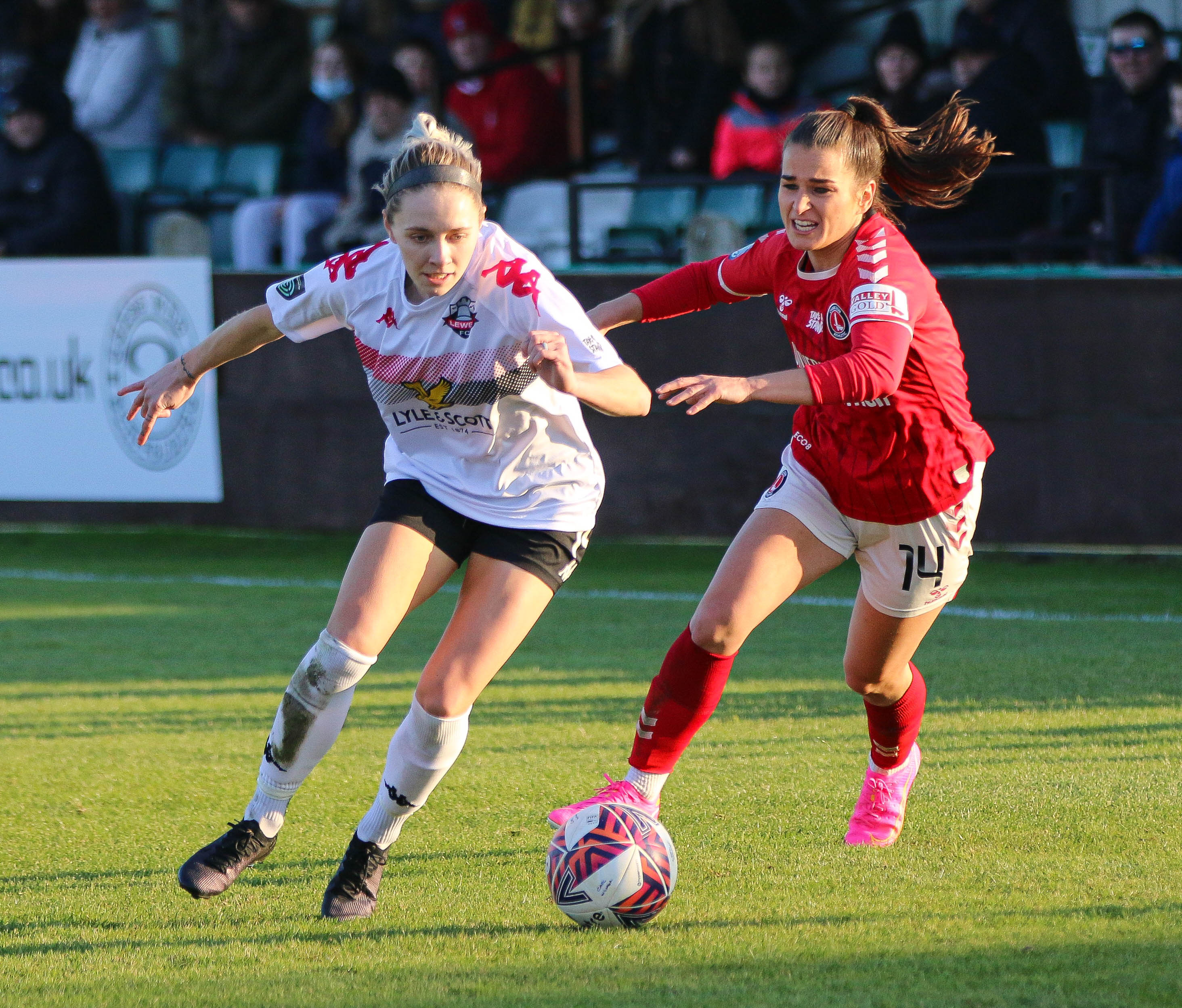
Paula Howells of Lewes FC Women vs Megan Wynne when at Charlton Ath Women in early 2022

In 2016, Wynne signed for Millwall. In 2018, she returned to Tottenham Hotspur, the club she supported growing up, on a permanent basis. A year later, she signed her first professional contract with the club, becoming a full-time professional having helped the side win promotion to the FA Women's Super League.

In 2021 she joined Charlton Athletic and in July 2022, Wynne signed for Southampton F.C. ahead of their debut season in the Women's Championship.

In August 2024, Wynne joined Australian A-League Women club Perth Glory on a two-year deal.

On 22 April 2025, Wynne confirmed she had suffered an Anterior cruciate ligament injury, and would require surgery.

== International career ==
Although born in England, Wynne has been capped for the Wales national team, qualifying through her Welsh-born paternal grandparents. She represented Wales at both under-17 and under-19 levels.

In April 2013, Wynne made her competitive debut for the senior squad as a substitute in place of Loren Dykes during a 5–1 victory over Turkey. She appeared for the team during the UEFA Women's Euro 2021 qualifying cycle.

== Personal life ==
Wynne attended the University of Hertfordshire where she obtained a first class honours degree in human resource management. When she began playing for Tottenham, Wynne also worked full-time in the club's human resources department.
