= Andria Georgiou =

English footballer (born 1996)

Personal information
- Date of birth: 15 April 1996 (age 30)
- Place of birth: England
- Position: Midfielder

Team information
- Current team: Watford
- Number: 15

Senior career*
Years	Team	Apps	(Gls)
2014–2017	London Bees	5	(0)
2017–2018	West Ham United	0	(0)
2018–2021	Crystal Palace	22	(1)
2021	Coventry City	0	(0)
2021–	Watford	30	(2)
- * Club domestic league appearances and goals as of 10 October 2025

Andria Georgiou (born 15 April 1996) is a professional footballer who plays as a midfielder for FA Women's National League Southern Premier club Watford.

== Early life ==
Georgiou is from North London. She holds dual nationality with Cyprus.

== Career ==
=== West Ham United ===
On 17 November 2017, West Ham United announced the signing of Georgiou along with Ellie Zoepfl and Zoe Swift. Georgiou was described as the club's 'optimist' as the club struggled for form in the 2017–18 season. She scored in the Women's Cup final in 2–1 victory against Charlton Athletic W.F.C.

=== Watford ===
Georgiou has played for Watford since 2021.
