= Benedicte Håland =

Norwegian footballer (born 1998)

Personal information
- Full name: Benedicte Iversen Håland
- Date of birth: 10 February 1998 (age 28)
- Place of birth: Ålesund, Norway
- Height: 1.80 m (5 ft 11 in)
- Position: Goalkeeper

Senior career*
| Years | Team | Apps | (Gls) |
| 2015–2017 | Arna-Bjørnar | 5 | |
| 2018–2019 | Sandviken | 2 | |
| 2020 | Lugano | 3 | |
| 2020–2021 | Bristol City | 1 | |
| 2021 | UMF Selfoss | 9 | |
| 2022 | Hellas Verona | 10 | |
| 2022 | Hibernian | 30 | |
| 2023 | Bristol City | 1 | |
| 2024–2025 | Southampton | 0 | |
| 2025 - present | Gwalia United F.C. | 34 | |

International career^{‡}
| 2014–2015 | Norway U17 | 3 | (0) |
| 2016–2018 | Norway U19 | 4 | (0) |
- * Club domestic league appearances and goals ‡ National team caps and goals as of 03:36, 12 December 2023 (UTC)

Benedicte Iversen Håland (born 10 February 1998) is a Norwegian professional footballer who currently plays as a goalkeeper at Gwalia United Football Club, in the FAWNL Southern Premier Division. Håland previously played football in the English WSL and WSL2, Norway, Switzerland, Iceland, Italy, and Scotland, and has represented the Norwegian U17 and U19 national teams.

== Club career ==
Håland was born in Norway and started her professional career at Arna-Bjørnar. She then spent a short time at Sandviken, which included a spell on loan to Fyllingsdalen.

Håland agreed a one-year contract with Swiss Women's Super League club Lugano in January 2020, before moving to Bristol City of the FA WSL in September 2020. After finishing the season at the bottom of the table, Bristol City were relegated. Straight off the back of the completion of the FA WSL season, Håland joined Icelandic top league team UMF Selfoss, until the end of the season. She spent the second half of the 2021–22 season at Italian side Hellas Verona.

In May 2022, it was announced that Benedicte would join the Scottish side Hibernian. Håland settled in as the number one choice goalkeeper and played the majority of league matches as well as several cup matches. Håland helped Hibernian lift the Capital Cup in November 2022 by saving a penalty during the penalty shoot-out in the final. She left the club at the end of the season, returning to Bristol City on a short-term contract. On 19 January 2024, she left Bristol City. Four days later, she signed for Women's Championship side Southampton. On 1 July 2025 it was announced that Håland was departing the club upon the expiry of her contract at the end of the 2024-25 season, having made two appearances overall.

It was announced in August 2025 that Håland had been signed by Welsh side Gwalia United F.C. She has played as the first choice goalkeeper since her signing, and is now in her second season with Gwalia United.

== International career ==
Håland was selected to train with the Norwegian under-17 national team in 2014. She played three matches and was called-up to the UEFA Women's Under-17 Championship in Iceland in the summer of 2015. She was also selected for the U19 team and played four matches.

== Personal life ==
Håland is an open member of the LGBT Community. According to social media, she and her partner became engaged in November 2022.

== Career statistics ==
=== Club ===
As of match played 10 December 2023

Appearances and goals by club, season and competition
| Club | Season | League | | | National cup (Note: Includes Norwegian Cup, Swiss Cup, Women's FA Cup, Icelandic Cup) | | League cup (Note: Includes FA Women's League Cup, Scottish Women's Premier League Cup) | | Total | |
| Club | Season | Division | Apps | Goals | Apps | Goals | Apps | Goals | Apps | Goals |
|---|---|---|---|---|---|---|---|---|---|---|
| Arna-Bjørnar | 2015 | Toppserien | 3 | 0 | 0 | 0 | — | | 3 | 0 |
| Arna-Bjørnar | 2016 | Toppserien | 0 | 0 | 0 | 0 | — | | 0 | 0 |
| Arna-Bjørnar | 2017 | Toppserien | 2 | 0 | 1 | 0 | — | | 2 | 0 |
| Arna-Bjørnar | Total | | 5 | 0 | 1 | 0 | — | | 5 | 0 |
| Sandviken | 2018 | Toppserien | 2 | 0 | 1 | 0 | — | | 3 | 0 |
| Sandviken | 2019 | Toppserien | 0 | 0 | 2 | 0 | — | | 2 | 0 |
| Sandviken | Total | | 2 | 0 | 3 | 0 | — | | 5 | 0 |
| Lugano | 2019–20 | Swiss Women's Super League | 3 | 0 | 0 | 0 | — | | 3 | 0 |
| | Total | | 3 | 0 | 0 | 0 | — | | 3 | 0 |
| Bristol City | 2020–21 | Women's Super League | 1 | 0 | 0 | 0 | 1 | 0 | 2 | 0 |
| | Total | | 1 | 0 | 0 | 0 | 1 | 0 | 2 | 0 |
| Selfoss | 2021 | Úrvaldsdeild Kvenna | 9 | 0 | 1 | 0 | 0 | 0 | 10 | 0 |
| | Total | | 9 | 0 | 1 | 0 | 0 | 0 | 10 | 0 |
| Hellas Verona | 2021–22 | Serie A | 10 | 0 | 0 | 0 | — | | 10 | 0 |
| | Total | | 10 | 0 | 0 | 0 | — | | 10 | 0 |
| Hibernian | 2022–23 | Scottish Women's Premier League | 30 | 0 | 0 | 0 | 1 | 0 | 31 | 0 |
| | Total | | 30 | 0 | 3 | 0 | 1 | 0 | 31 | 0 |
| Bristol City | 2023–24 | Women's Super League | 1 | 0 | 0 | 0 | 2 | 0 | 3 | 0 |
| | Total | | 1 | 0 | 0 | 0 | 2 | 0 | 3 | 0 |
| Career total | | | 61 | 0 | 4 | 0 | 3 | 0 | 69 | 0 |
