= Laura Rafferty =

Northern Irish footballer

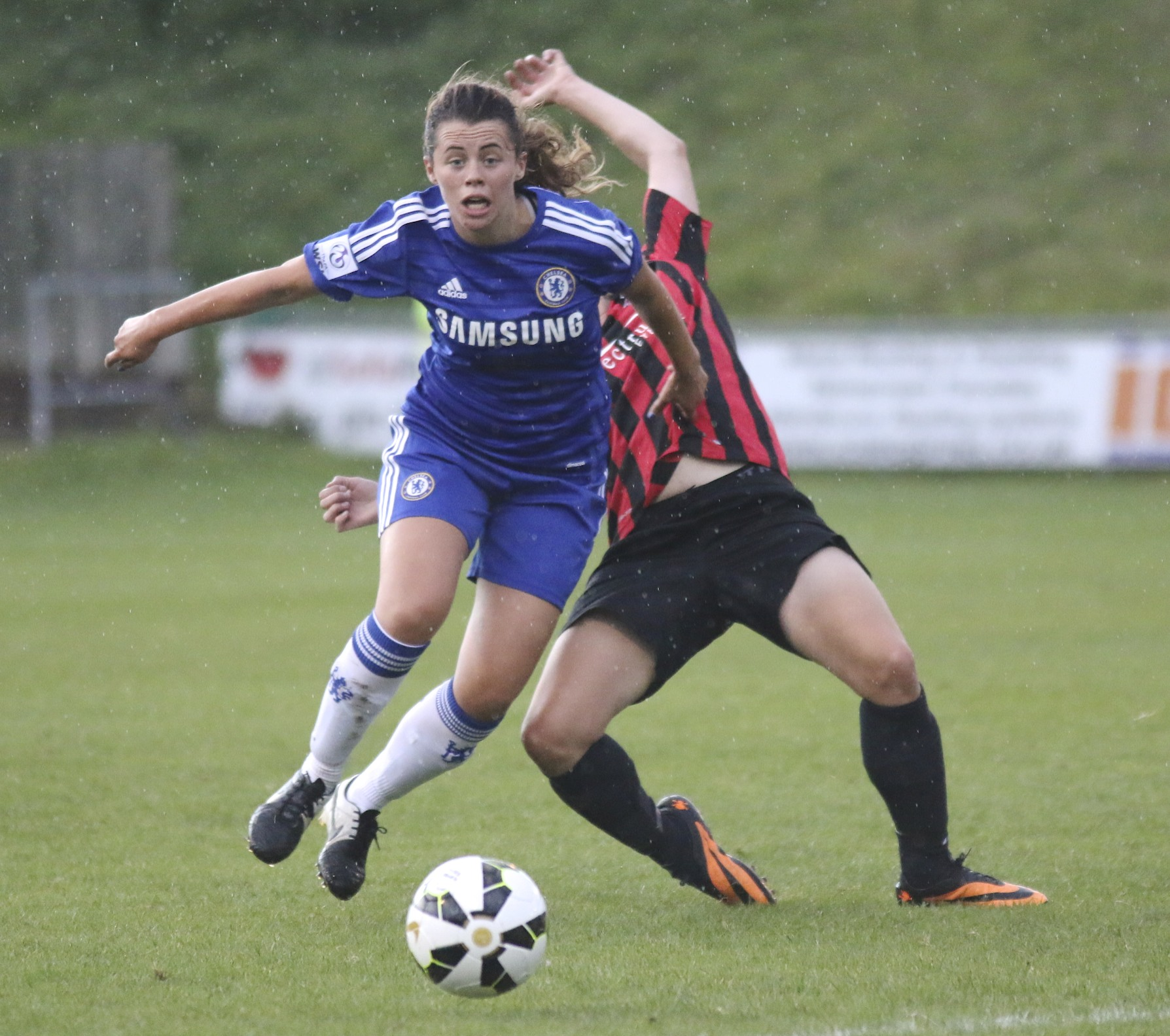
- Rafferty competing for Chelsea, August 2014

Personal information
- Full name: Laura Marie Rafferty
- Date of birth: 29 April 1996 (age 30)
- Place of birth: Southampton, England
- Height: 1.73 m (5 ft 8 in)
- Position: Defender

Team information
- Current team: Rangers
- Number: 5

Youth career
- Southampton
- –2014: Hampshire Centre of Excellence

Senior career*
Years	Team	Apps	(Gls)
2014–2016	Chelsea	16	(1)
2016	→ Oxford United (loan)	9	(0)
2017–2021	Brighton & Hove Albion	30	(2)
2020–2021	→ Bristol City (loan)	17	(0)
2021–2024	Southampton	47	(4)
2024–	Rangers	9	(1)

International career^{‡}
2013–2015	Northern Ireland U19	9	(1)
2013–	Northern Ireland	33	(0)
- * Club domestic league appearances and goals as of 17:12, 14 November 2024 (UTC) ‡ National team caps and goals as of 23:00, 25 February 2024 (UTC)

Laura Marie Rafferty (born 29 April 1996) is a Northern Irish professional footballer who plays as a defender for Scottish Women's Premier League club Rangers and the Northern Ireland national team. She previously played for Chelsea.

== Early life ==
Rafferty began playing football for a local team at the age of eight. After scoring 50 goals in 8 games, she reported being "chucked out of the league." She played for eight years with the Southampton F.C. Academy as well as the Hampshire Centre of Excellence before moving to Chelsea F.C. Women.

== Club career ==
Rafferty started her senior career in 2014 at Chelsea F.C. Women. She spent part of 2016 on loan at Oxford United. After three seasons with Chelsea F.C. Women with limited game time, Rafferty signed with Brighton & Hove Albion in the FA WSL 2 in January 2017 for the 2017 Spring Series. The team has since moved up to England's top flight, the FA WSL.

In September 2020 Rafferty joined Bristol City on loan for the 2020–21 season. Bristol finished bottom of the WSL table and were relegated to the FA Women's Championship.

On 5 July 2021 Rafferty joined third-tier, Southampton after being released by Brighton. Saints were promoted in the 2021–22 season to the FA Women's Championship, Tier 2 of the English football pyramid. Upon the expiry of her contract with Southampton, Rafferty joined Rangers on a two-year deal.

== International career ==
Rafferty made her debut for the Northern Ireland national team on 6 March 2013 in a match against the Republic of Ireland.

Rafferty was part of the squad that was called up to the UEFA Women's Euro 2022. A a veteran of the Northern Ireland squad, she wore the captain's armband for the first time in 2024 in a qualifying match for UEFA Women's Euro 2025. Later the same year, she led the team out again as she made her 50th international appearance.

== Career statistics ==
As of

Club	Season	League			National Cup		League Cup		Continental		Total	
Club	Season	Division	Apps	Goals	Apps	Goals	Apps	Goals	Apps	Goals	Apps	Goals
Chelsea F.C. Women	2015	FA Women's Super League	15	1	0	0	—		—		15	1
Chelsea F.C. Women	2016	FA Women's Super League	1	0	0	0	0	0	—		1	0
Chelsea F.C. Women	Total		16	1	0	0	0	0	0	0	16	1
Oxford United W.F.C. (loan)	2016	FA WSL 2	9	0	0	0	0	0	—		9	0
Brighton & Hove Albion F.C.	2017-18	Women's Championship	17	1	0	0	5	0	—		22	1
Brighton & Hove Albion F.C.	2018-19	FA Women's Super League	13	1	0	0	3	0	—		26	1
Brighton & Hove Albion F.C.	2019-20	FA Women's Super League	0	0	0	0	0	0	—		0	0
Brighton & Hove Albion F.C.	Total		30	2	2	0	8	0	0	0	38	2
Bristol City (loan)	2020-21	FA Women's Super League	13	0	0	0	4	0	—		17	0
Southampton F.C. Women	2021-22	FA Women's National League	24	3	4	0	5	0	—		33	3
Southampton F.C. Women	2022-23	Women's Championship	11	1	1	0	1	0	—		13	1
Southampton F.C. Women	2023-24	Women's Championship	12	0	3	0	3	0	—		18	0
Southampton F.C. Women	Total		47	4	8	0	9	0	0	0	66	4
Rangers F.C.	2024-25	Scottish Women's Premier League	9	1	4	0	0	0	2	0	33	3
Career total			124	8	11	0	21	0	2	0	158	8
