= Kiera Skeels =

English footballer (born 2001)

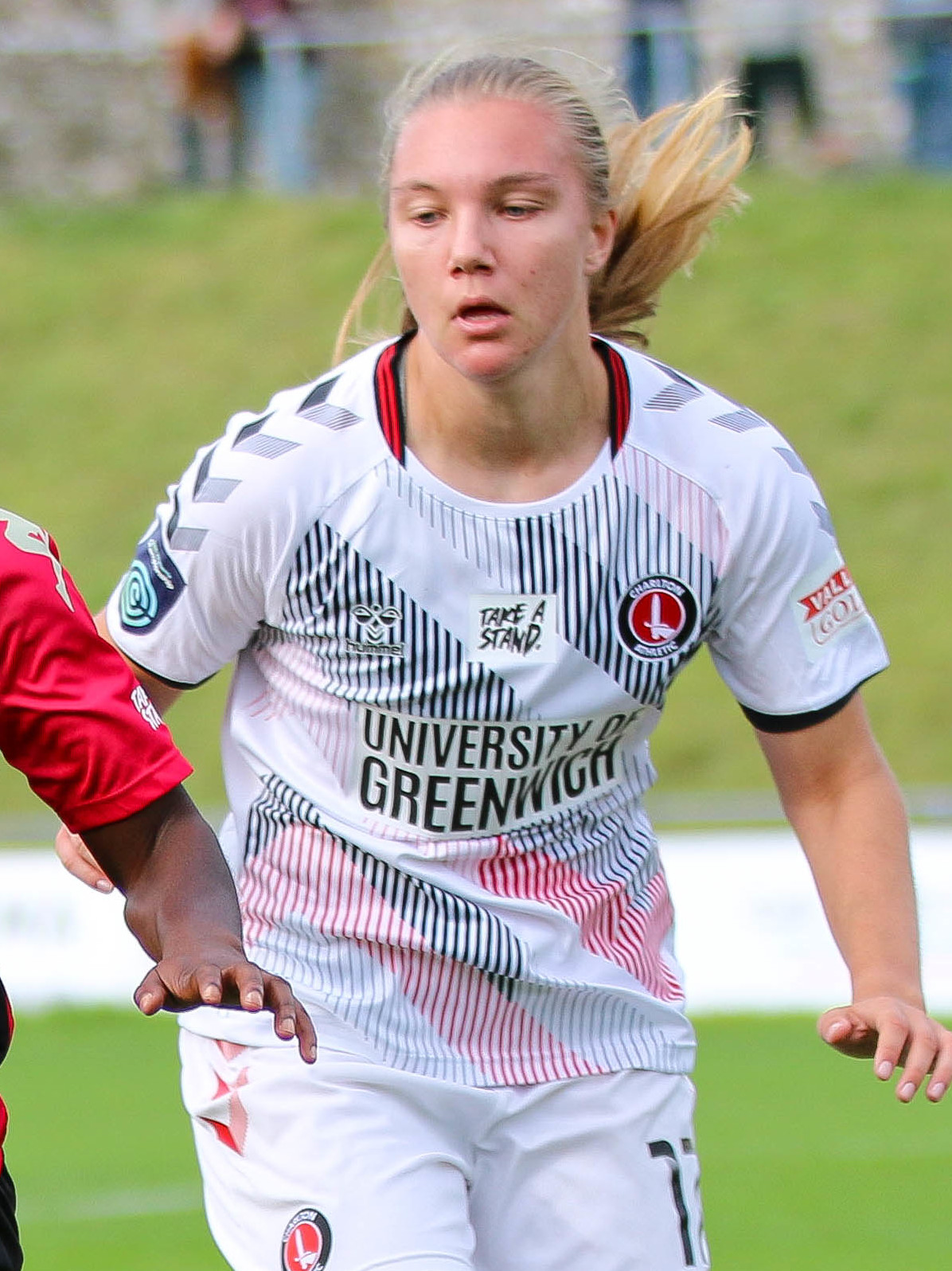
- Skeels playing for Charlton Athletic in 2021

Personal information
- Full name: Kiera Susan Louise Skeels
- Date of birth: 20 November 2001 (age 24)
- Place of birth: Basingstoke, Hampshire, England
- Position: Defender

Team information
- Current team: Charlton Athletic
- Number: 17

Youth career
- –2018: Reading

Senior career*
Years	Team	Apps	(Gls)
2018–2021	Reading	0	(0)
2021	→ Bristol City (loan)	10	(0)
2021–	Charlton Athletic	69	(4)

International career^{‡}
2018	England U17	2	(0)
2018	England U18	2	(0)
2019–2020	England U19	11	(0)
2022–	England U23	12	(4)
- * Club domestic league appearances and goals as of 01:51, 27 October 2024 (UTC) ‡ National team caps and goals as of 23:43, 4 April 2024 (UTC)

Kiera Susan Louise Skeels (born 20 November 2001) is an English professional footballer who plays as a defender for Women's Super League club Charlton Athletic. She has represented England at youth level.

== Club career ==
=== Reading ===
Skeels made her debut for Reading in the FA Women's League Cup on 20 October 2019. On 17 July 2020, she signed her first professional contract with the club.

==== Loan spell at Bristol City ====
On 3 February 2021, it was announced that Skeels was going on loan to Bristol City for the rest of the season. She made her debut for Bristol in a 3–0 win at Brighton coming on in the 76th minute. Skeels helped Bristol to the final of the WSL Cup in her first start for the club with a 72nd-minute winner against Leicester.

=== Charlton Athletic ===
On 30 July 2021, Skeels was announced as part of Charlton Athletic's squad for the 2021–22 FA Women's Championship. She made her league debut against Coventry United on 5 September 2021. On 5 July 2022, Skeels signed a one year contract extension. She scored her first league goal against Sunderland on 25 September 2022, scoring in the 79th minute. On 5 July 2023, Skeels signed a new one year contract extension with the club. On 9 July 2024, she signed a new one year deal with the club. On 10 July 2025, Skeels signed a further two-year contract extension with Charlton.

== International career ==
On 30 September 2022, Skeels was announced in the England U23s squad.

On 25 September 2023, Skeels scored against Belgium U23s, scoring a header in the 72nd minute. This was her first international goal at U23 level. On 30 October 2023, she scored a header against Portugal U23s, scoring in the 76th minute. On 4 April 2024, Skeels scored a tap-in after being assisted by Aggie Beever-Jones, scoring in the 47th minute.

== Career statistics ==
=== Club ===
As of match played 3 March 2024

Appearances and goals by club, season and competition
Club	Season	League			National Cup		League Cup		Total	
Club	Season	Division	Apps	Goals	Apps	Goals	Apps	Goals	Apps	Goals
Reading	2018–19	FA WSL	0	0	0	0	0	0	0	0
Reading	2019–20	FA WSL	0	0	0	0	2	0	2	0
Reading	2020–21	FA WSL	0	0	0	0	0	0	0	0
Reading	Total		0	0	0	0	2	0	2	0
Bristol City (loan)	2020–21	FA WSL	10	0	1	0	2	1	13	1
Charlton Athletic	2021–22	Women's Championship	19	0	1	0	2	0	22	0
Charlton Athletic	2022–23	Women's Championship	21	3	2	1	3	2	26	6
Charlton Athletic	2023–24	Women's Championship	15	0	2	0	3	0	20	0
Charlton Athletic	Total		55	3	5	1	8	2	68	6
Career total			65	0	6	1	12	2	83	7
