= Arsenal Women 11–1 Bristol City Women =

2019 women's association football match

Arsenal 11–1 Bristol City
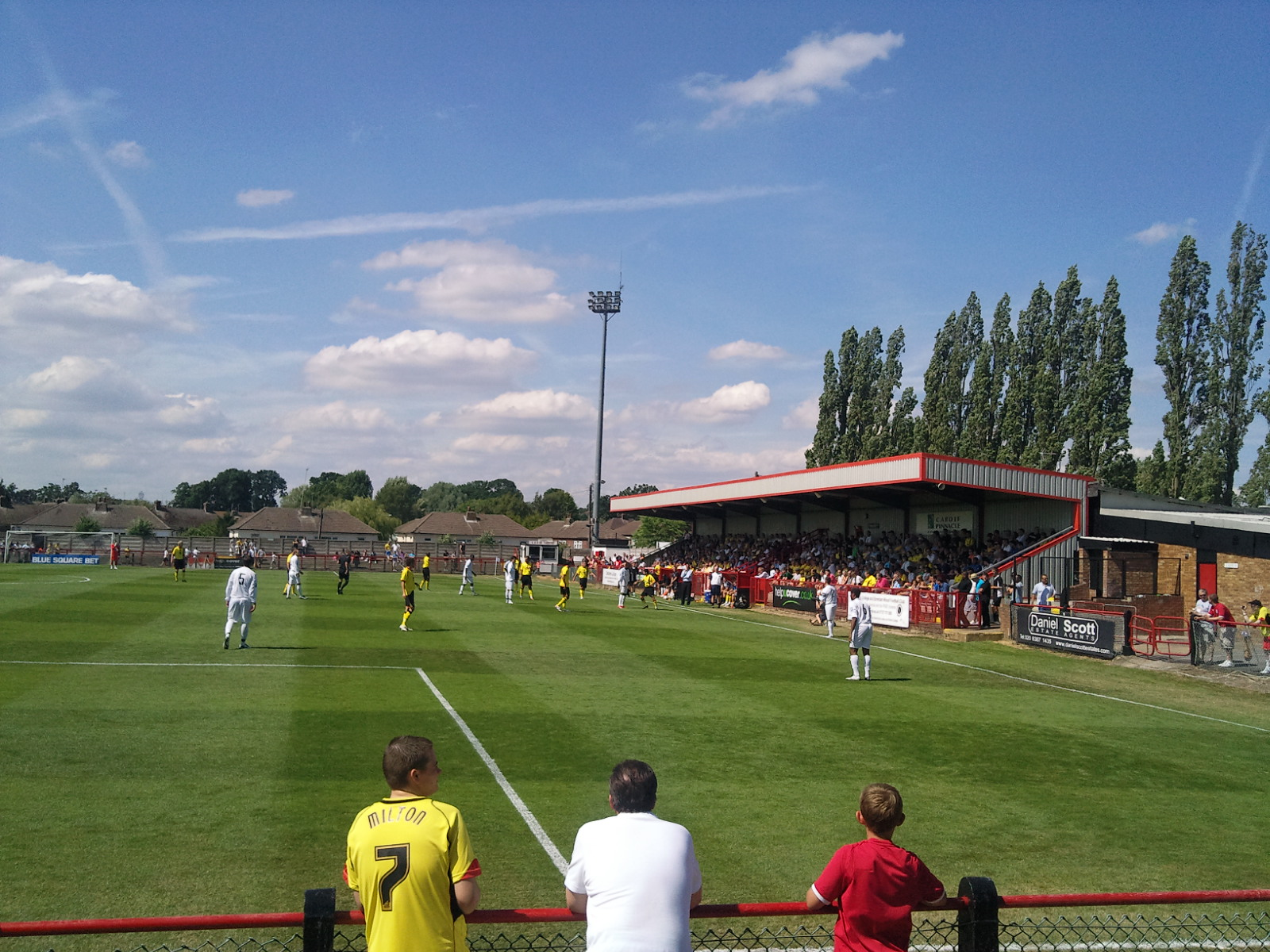
- The match was played at Meadow Park in Borehamwood (pictured in 2010).
- Event: 2019–20 FA WSL
Arsenal Women	Bristol City Women
11	1
- Date: 1 December 2019
- Venue: Meadow Park, Borehamwood
- Referee: Helen Conley (Durham)
- Attendance: 1,513

The women's association football match between Arsenal Women and Bristol City Women was played at Arsenal's home venue, Meadow Park, Borehamwood, on 1 December 2019. It was part of the 2019–20 Football Association Women's Super League (FA WSL) and finished in an 11–1 victory for the home team. It became the highest-scoring game in the league's history, surpassing Liverpool's 9–0 victory over Doncaster Rovers Belles in 2013.

Arsenal were the reigning champions and entered the match third in the league. Bristol City were in tenth position, having not won a game in that season. Dutch international striker Vivianne Miedema scored six of the eleven Arsenal goals, a league record. With her goal tally, she surpassed South Korean Ji So-yun to become the highest-scoring non-British player in FA WSL history. She was involved in all of Arsenal's first ten goals, having assisted the other four, and was substituted before the eleventh was made. This broke her own FA WSL record of five goal involvements that she had set against Liverpool in September 2018. The other Arsenal scorers were Lisa Evans (twice), Leah Williamson, Jordan Nobbs, and Emma Mitchell. Yana Daniëls scored the only goal for Bristol City.

BBC Sport called the match an "amazing 11–1 thrashing", while Suzanne Wrack of The Guardian praised Miedema's performance as "one of the great individual displays of any era". The press in Germany, the Netherlands, Belgium and the United States also reported on the record-breaking game. The result put Arsenal top of the league and left Bristol City in eleventh place out of twelve clubs. The return match was never played, as The Football Association suspended the season because of the COVID-19 pandemic. Arsenal finished the season in third position while Bristol City finished tenth, narrowly avoiding relegation.

== Background ==
The Football Association Women's Super League (FA WSL) is a professional association football league of twelve clubs that was launched in 2011 by The Football Association (the FA) to replace the FA Women's Premier League National Division as the highest level of women's football in England. Arsenal won the first two editions of the FA WSL. (Note: In 2017 Arsenal changed their name from Arsenal Ladies to Arsenal Women.) They entered the 2019–20 season as the reigning league champions, having finished first in the 2018–19 FA WSL season by seven points. Bristol City Women played in the inaugural FA WSL season under the name of Bristol Academy. After being relegated in 2015, they rebranded and won promotion back into the top league in 2016. In the 2017–18 season, Bristol City drew their away game with Arsenal at Meadow Park 1–1. In the 2018–19 season they lost the away fixture 4–0, allowing Arsenal's Dutch international striker Vivianne Miedema to score three goals for a hat-trick. Bristol City finished the 2018–19 season in sixth position.

The first round of the 2019–20 season took place in September. Arsenal signed three new players on the squad: Jill Roord, Leonie Maier, and goalkeeper Manuela Zinsberger. They began with a home win over West Ham United. Manager Joe Montemurro brought on Jordan Nobbs who had been out with a serious injury sustained in November 2018. Prior to round eight the defending champions had recorded six wins and one defeat, having lost their away game at 2017–18 champions Chelsea, resulting in eighteen points from seven games. (Note: Each win counts as three points; a draw one point; a loss zero points.) By the end of November 2019, Chelsea led the league with nineteen points. Arsenal were tied with Manchester City with the second-most points, but were in third position in the table by virtue of having a worse goal difference. (Note: When two teams have equal points, the team with the highest net difference between goals scored and goals conceded ranks higher.)

Bristol City signed five new players for the 2019–20 season: Jasmine Matthews, Yana Daniëls, Charlie Wellings, Meaghan Sargeant, and Ebony Salmon. They started with a draw with Brighton & Hove Albion. Manager Tanya Oxtoby stated afterwards that the players needed time to get used to each other. By the end of November, Bristol City were still winless but managed to gain points from three draws, including one with bottom-placed Liverpool. This left Bristol City in tenth place, tied on three points with Birmingham City, but slightly ahead on goal difference. Arsenal and Bristol City had met on 21 November in the League Cup. Arsenal won that match 7–0. Both squads were at full strength for the game, reporting no injured players.

== Match ==
=== Summary ===
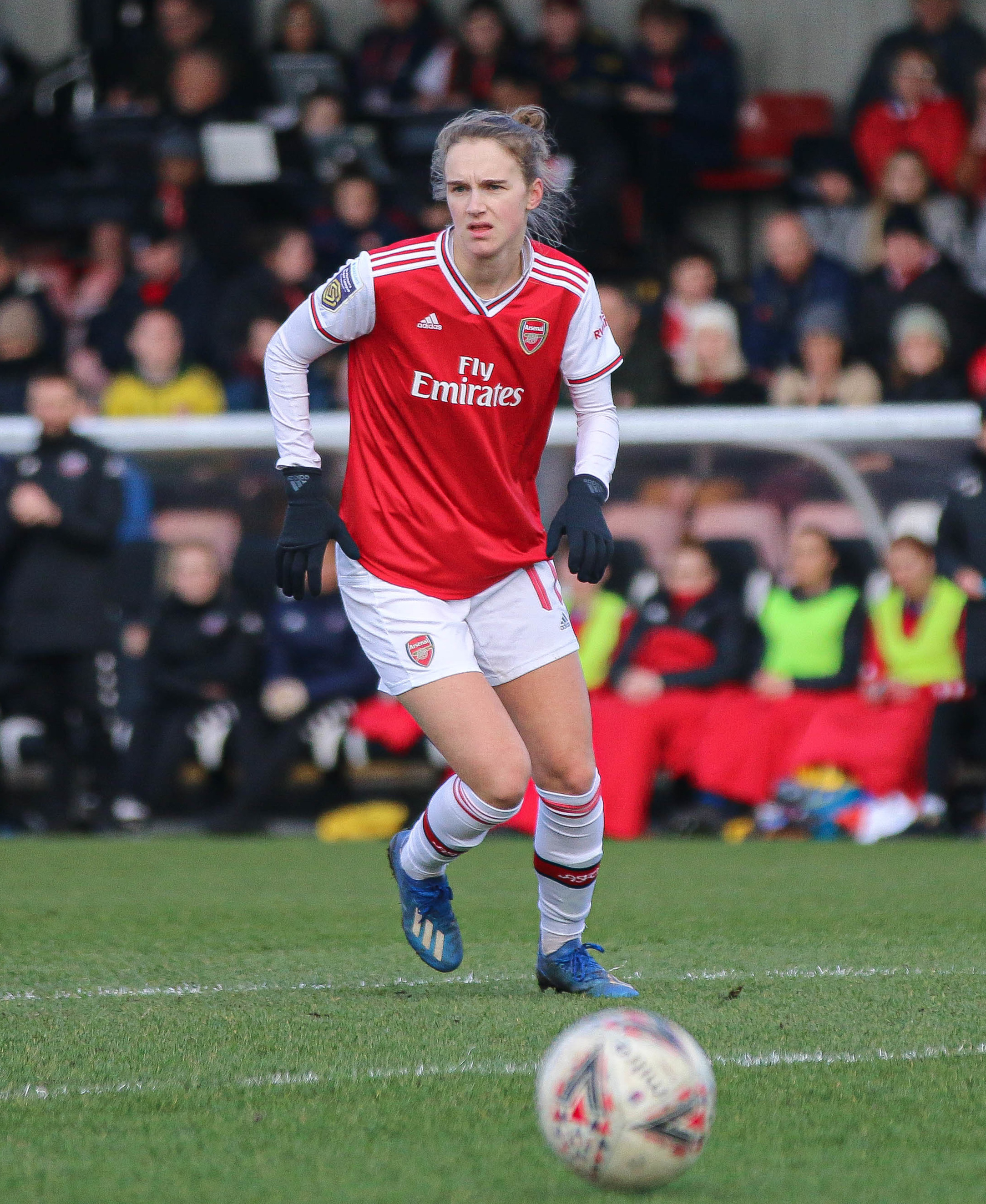
Vivianne Miedema scored six goals (pictured in February 2020).

The match started at 12:30 pm at Meadow Park on 1 December 2019 in front of a crowd of 1,513 spectators with Helen Conley from Durham as the referee. The game was broadcast live on BBC Red Button and the FA made a livestream available on its FA Player. Arsenal began the game in a 3–1–4–2 formation, with three defenders, one defensive midfielder, four attacking midfielders and two forwards; Bristol City used a 3–4–2–1 formation, with three defenders, four defensive midfielders, two attacking midfielders, and one forward. In the second minute, Arsenal's Beth Mead had the first chance to score but her attempt was saved by Bristol City goalkeeper Sophie Baggaley. Two corner kicks for the home team quickly followed, but neither led to a goal. In the seventh minute, Miedema sprinted past a Bristol City defender and put the ball in front of goal from the left edge of the penalty area. Lisa Evans then headed it in from close range, opening the scoring for Arsenal. Three minutes later Miedema received the ball in the far right-hand corner of the pitch and crossed it to defender Leah Williamson, who scored with a header, doubling Arsenal's lead. In the fifteenth minute Miedema scored with a right-footed shot from the centre of the penalty area after a pass from Lia Wälti. Miedema scored the match's fourth goal from very close range after receiving the ball from Mead. Her third goal came in the thirty-sixth minute, when the Bristol City defence did not deal well with a ball from Evans, allowing Miedema to score again. Arsenal went into the half-time break with a 5–0 lead.

External videos
- Arsenal Women 11–1 Bristol City Highlights, YouTube video from Arsenal

Neither team made personnel changes during half time. Six minutes into the second half Daniëlle van de Donk passed the ball to Miedema, who took a shot with her right foot from the centre of the penalty area that landed just inside the goal. Nobbs became the fourth goalscorer of the game three minutes later when she sprinted into the penalty area to shoot from a long pass from Miedema, making the score 7–0. Miedema and Evans then set each other up for the goals that followed. First, Evans assisted Miedema with a pass from the edge of the penalty area, who, after a short run, scored Arsenal's eighth. Next, on the hour mark, Miedema's chip over the defence set up Evans for her second goal of the day, bringing the score to 9–0. Four minutes later Miedema scored her sixth goal (and completed her second hat-trick) to send Arsenal into double figures. When she was substituted out of the game after seventy minutes, she received a standing ovation. Her replacement, Emma Mitchell, scored the home team's final goal of the day after a pass from Mead, making the score 11–0. Bristol City were awarded a late penalty after their Belgian international striker Daniëls was fouled by Arsenal's goalkeeper Zinsberger in the penalty area. Zinsberger had been dispossessed by Daniëls while she was trying to pass the ball away. Zinsberger initially saved Daniëls's penalty kick, but Daniëls was able to get to the rebound first and score the last goal of the match, giving Bristol City a consolation goal. The final score was 11–1. By the end of the game, Arsenal had taken thirty-four shots, an average of one about every three minutes.

=== Match details ===
1 December 2019
12:30 GMT

Arsenal	11–1	Bristol City
Evans 7', 60'; Williamson 10'; Miedema 15', 32', 36', 51', 56', 64'; Nobbs 54'; Mitchell 79'	Report	Daniëls 85'

Meadow Park, Borehamwood
Referee: Helen Conley (Durham)

Arsenal	Bristol City

GK	1	(Austria) Manuela Zinsberger
RB	6	(England) Leah Williamson	(substituted off) 66'
CB	5	(Scotland) Jen Beattie	(substituted off) 65'
LB	22	(Austria) Viktoria Schnaderbeck
DM	13	(Switzerland) Lia Wälti
RM	17	(Scotland) Lisa Evans
CM	8	(England) Jordan Nobbs
CM	7	(Netherlands) Daniëlle van de Donk
LM	23	(England) Beth Mead
CF	14	(Netherlands) Jill Roord
CF	11	(Netherlands) Vivianne Miedema	(substituted off) 70'
Substitutes:
GK	18	(France) Pauline Peyraud-Magnin
DF	5	(Scotland) Emma Mitchell	(substituted on) 70'
DF	16	(Republic of Ireland) Louise Quinn	(substituted on) 65'
DF	20	(Germany) Leonie Maier	(substituted on) 66'
MF	10	(Scotland) Kim Little
Manager:
(Australia) Joe Montemurro

GK	1	(England) Sophie Baggaley
CB	16	(England) Meaghan Sargeant
CB	5	(Scotland) Frankie Brown
CB	4	(England) Jasmine Matthews
RM	2	(Wales) Loren Dykes
CM	8	(England) Carla Humphrey
CM	25	(New Zealand) Olivia Chance
LM	12	(England) Florence Allen	(substituted off) 57'
AM	10	(Belgium) Yana Daniëls
AM	11	(England) Charlie Wellings	(substituted off) 80'
CF	9	(England) Ebony Salmon	(substituted off) 67'
Substitutes:
GK	13	(Scotland) Eartha Cumings
DF	3	(Wales) Gemma Evans
DF	7	(England) Poppy Pattinson
MF	18	(England) Maisy Collis	(substituted on) 57'
FW	19	(England) Katie Robinson	(substituted on) 80'
MF	20	(England) Georgia Wilson	(substituted on) 67'
DF	22	(Wales) Ellie-Mai Sanford
Manager:
(Australia) Tanya Oxtoby

Match rules

- 90 minutes
- No extra time or penalties
- Up to seven named substitutes
- Maximum of three substitutions

==== Statistics ====
Statistics
Statistic	Arsenal	Bristol City
Goals scored	11	1
Total shots	34	5
Shots on target	16	2
Ball possession	74%	26%
Corner kicks	12	3
Fouls conceded	2	2
Yellow cards	0	0
Red cards	0	0

=== Records ===
The match set multiple league records. It became the highest-scoring game, surpassing Liverpool's 9–0 victory over Doncaster Rovers Belles in 2013. It had the highest winning margin in league history, and was the first time a team's score was in double figures. Miedema became the first FA WSL player to score a double hat-trick. Her involvement in ten goals (six goals, four assists) broke the previous record of five, which she had set in September 2018 against Liverpool (three goals, two assists). With her fourth goal, Miedema surpassed South Korean Ji So-yun as the highest-scoring non-British player in league history, ultimately extending the record to thirty-six goals by the end of the match.

== Post-match ==
=== Reactions ===
BBC Sport called the match an "amazing 11–1 thrashing" and singled out Miedema for her "remarkable individual performance". They thought her fourth goal was the best of the game, as did the FA. The Independent's Tom Holmes described her fourth as "wonderful". Molly Hudson in The Times wrote it was difficult to find fresh superlatives to describe Miedema. The Guardian's Suzanne Wrack wrote that the Arsenal "collective was clicking like never before", displaying "crisp instinctive passing", and described Miedema's performance as "one of the great individual displays of any era", an assessment echoed by The Telegraph and goal.com. The international press also reacted. ESPN labelled Miedema's performance as a "stunning solo display of attacking football" and Belgian newspaper Het Nieuwsblad called it "an exceptional achievement". Dutch football magazine Voetbal International referred to her as "inimitable". German football magazine Kicker said it was something of which Messi, Ronaldo, and Lewandowski "could only dream". Eurosport wrote that she further proved her credentials as a nominee for the Ballon d'Or Féminin, an award presented by the French football magazine France Football honouring the world's best female football player.

In a post-match interview, Miedema said that she was probably happier helping other players score than scoring herself:

The last few games have been really difficult for us, so it was important to raise the goal difference. I felt really good. I was probably happier with the assists than with the goals. We created more space with three-at-the-back. We knew where we could get at Bristol having played them recently. We've got the players to play three or four at the back which really helps.

— Vivianne Miedema

Looking back on the game after the season had ended, she said it had felt like a training game.

Bristol City manager Oxtoby said her team did not follow the game plan, resulting in an unacceptable performance. She described the players and staff as "devastated", adding, "We need to move on because, from my perspective, there's nothing to be learned from that."

=== Aftermath ===
After the match, Arsenal moved from third to first in the table with twenty-one points. Chelsea had their eighth-round game against Everton postponed because of a frozen pitch, keeping them on nineteen points. Manchester City recorded a 1–0 win over Liverpool, which was not enough to maintain their goal-difference advantage over Arsenal. Bristol City dropped from tenth place to eleventh, placing them second from the bottom of the table, owing to goal difference. Miedema kept her position as the league's top goalscorer with ten goals. She also kept her position as the league leader in assists with seven. Her double hat-trick brought her season goal total across all competitions, club and Dutch national team, to twenty-eight from sixteen games.

In the following weeks, Arsenal kept their top league position with wins over Reading, Everton, Birmingham City, and Brighton. On 19 January 2020, they lost 4–1 at home to Chelsea, allowing Manchester City to take the top position. A second loss in a row, a 2–1 defeat away at Manchester City, saw Arsenal drop to third in the table. On 13 February Arsenal won their away game at Liverpool. The following weekend Arsenal's game with Reading was postponed. Manchester City and Chelsea played each other and drew 3–3. This meant that Manchester City topped the table with forty points from sixteen matches, followed by Chelsea with thirty-nine from fifteen and Arsenal with thirty-three from fifteen.

Matches for the 2019–20 season stopped after 23 February 2020 because of the COVID-19 pandemic. The return match between Bristol City and Arsenal, scheduled for 22 March, was postponed, as on 13 March the FA suspended the season. On 5 June, the FA declared Chelsea champions, based on them having 2.60 points per game, ahead of Manchester City's 2.50 and Arsenal's 2.40. Since Arsenal did not finish in the top two, they did not qualify for the 2020–21 UEFA Women's Champions League. Miedema's sixteen goals in the abbreviated season earned her the league's Golden Boot award for most goals scored, awarded by British banking firm Barclays, sponsor of the FA WSL. The Football Writers' Association named her Women's Footballer of Year, and the Professional Footballers' Association named her the WSL PFA Fans' Player of the Year. On 6 March 2022, Miedema became the first player in the history of the WSL to be involved in 100 goals, with 10 of them coming from the 2019 Bristol City game.

After their record-breaking defeat against Arsenal, Bristol City's winless streak continued until 5 January 2020, when they beat Manchester United. They achieved a second win in what turned out to be their last game of the season on 23 February 2020, climbing from the bottom of the table with six points to tenth position with nine points. They narrowly avoided relegation, having earned nine points in fourteen games (0.64 points per game) versus Liverpool's six points in fourteen games (0.43) and Birmingham City's seven points in thirteen games (0.54).

== See also ==
- 2019–20 Arsenal W.F.C. season
- 2019–20 Bristol City W.F.C. season
