= 2019–20 Bristol City W.F.C. season =

Bristol City
2019–20 season
- Chairman: Simon Arnold
- Head Coach: Tanya Oxtoby
- Stadium: Stoke Gifford Stadium, Filton
- FA WSL: 10th
- FA Cup: Fifth round
- League Cup: Group stage
- Top goalscorer: League: Ebony Salmon (5); All: Ebony Salmon (8)
- Highest home attendance: 3,041 (vs. Brighton & Hove Albion, 7 September)
- Lowest home attendance: League: 404 (vs. Birmingham City, 8 December); All: 317 (vs. London City Lionesses, 3 November, League Cup)
- Average home league attendance: 1,215 as of 19 January 2020
Home colours	Away colours

The 2019–20 Bristol City W.F.C. season was the club's fourth season under the Bristol City affiliation and the organisation's 21st overall season in existence. It was their third consecutive full season in the FA Women's Super League following promotion to the 2017 Spring Season. Along with competing in the WSL, the club also competed in two domestic cup competitions: the FA Cup and the League Cup.

On 13 March 2020, in line with the FA's response to the coronavirus pandemic, it was announced the season was temporarily suspended until at least 3 April 2020. After further postponements, the season was ultimately ended prematurely on 25 May 2020 with immediate effect. Bristol City sat in 10th at the time and retained their position on sporting merit after The FA Board's decision to award places on a points-per-game basis.

== Squad ==
As of 30 January 2020.

Note: Flags indicate national team as defined under FIFA eligibility rules; some limited exceptions apply. Players may hold more than one non-FIFA nationality.

No.	Pos.	Nation	Player
1	GK	ENG	Sophie Baggaley
2	DF	WAL	Loren Dykes (captain)
3	DF	WAL	Gemma Evans
4	DF	ENG	Jasmine Matthews
5	DF	SCO	Frankie Brown
6	MF	AUS	Chloe Logarzo
7	DF	ENG	Poppy Pattinson
8	MF	ENG	Carla Humphrey
9	FW	ENG	Ebony Salmon
10	FW	BEL	Yana Daniëls
11	FW	ENG	Charlie Wellings
12	DF	ENG	Florence Allen

No.	Pos.	Nation	Player
13	GK	SCO	Eartha Cumings
14	FW	KOR	Jeon Ga-eul
15	MF	WAL	Megan Wynne (on loan from Tottenham Hotspur)
16	DF	ENG	Meaghan Sargeant
18	DF	ENG	Maisy Collis
19	MF	ENG	Katie Robinson
20	MF	ENG	Georgia Wilson
21	FW	SCO	Abi Harrison
25	MF	NZL	Olivia Chance
26	DF	ENG	Faye Bryson
27	FW	ENG	Jessica Wooley

== FA Women's Super League ==
=== Results summary ===
Overall								Home						Away					
Pld	W	D	L	GF	GA	GD	Pts	W	D	L	GF	GA	GD	W	D	L	GF	GA	GD
14	2	3	9	9	38	−29	9	0	1	5	1	14	−13	2	2	4	8	24	−16

Last updated: 23 February 2020.
Source: FA WSL

=== Results by matchday ===
Round	1	2	3	4	5	6	7	8	9	10	11	12	13	14	15	16	17	18	19	20	21	22
Ground	H	A	H	A	H	A	H	A	H	A	A	H	A	A	H	A	H	H	H	H	A	A
Result	D	L	L	D	L	D	L	L	L	W	L	L	L	W	C	C	C	C	C	C	C	C
Position	7	9	10	10	10	11	10	11	11	11	11	12	12	10								

A = Away; H = Home; W = Win; D = Draw; L = Loss

=== Results ===
7 September 2019 1	Bristol City	0–0	Brighton & Hove Albion	Bristol
15:00	Daniëls (yellow card) 40'	Report	Skovsen (yellow card) 86'	Stadium: Ashton Gate; Attendance: 3,041; Referee: Abigail Bryne

15 September 2019 2	Everton	2–0	Bristol City	Southport
12:30	George (yellow card) 14'; Kelly 44', 45+1'; Clémaron (yellow card) 72'	Report		Stadium: Haig Avenue; Attendance: 441; Referee: Amy Fearn

29 September 2019 3	Bristol City	0–4	Chelsea	Filton
14:30	Harrison (yellow card) 54'	Report	Reiten 3', 10'; Ji 17'; Ingle 78'	Stadium: Stoke Gifford Stadium; Attendance: 986; Referee: Lisa Benn

13 October 2019 4	Liverpool	1–1	Bristol City	Birkenhead
12:00	Lawley 72' (pen.)	Report	Salmon 16'; Brown (yellow card) 41'	Stadium: Prenton Park; Attendance: 924; Referee: Martin Woods

27 October 2019 5	Bristol City	1–2	Tottenham Hotspur	Filton
15:00	Harrison 39'	Report	Godfrey (yellow card) 30'; Graham 63', 64'; Peplow (yellow card) 86'	Stadium: Stoke Gifford Stadium; Attendance: 639; Referee: Daniel Lamport

17 November 2019 6	Reading	3–3	Bristol City	Reading
14:00	Allen 17'; Chaplen 18'; James 47'; Howard (yellow card) 74'	Report	Brown (yellow card) 25'; Wellings 38'; Daniëls 49'; Salmon 83'	Stadium: Madjeski Stadium; Attendance: 1,420; Referee: Kirsty Dowle

24 November 2019 7	Bristol City	0–5	Manchester City	Filton
12:30		Report	Wullaert 21'; White 65'; Bremer 84', 90+2'; Weir 87'	Stadium: Stoke Gifford Stadium; Attendance: 1,212; Referee: Lucy Oliver

1 December 2019 8	Arsenal	11–1	Bristol City	Borehamwood
12:30	Evans 7', 60'; Williamson 10'; Miedema 15', 32', 26', 51', 56', 64'; Nobbs 54'; Mitchell 79'	Report	Daniëls 85'	Stadium: Meadow Park; Referee: Helen Conley
Note: New FA WSL record scoreline

8 December 2019 9	Bristol City	0–2	Birmingham City	Filton
15:00	Pattinson (yellow card) 36'; Wilson (yellow card) 36'	Report	Whipp 5'; Walker (yellow card) 26'; Grant 65'	Stadium: Stoke Gifford Stadium; Attendance: 404; Referee: Sam Allison

15 December 2019	Bristol City	P–P	West Ham United	Filton
15:00				Stadium: Stoke Gifford Stadium
Note: Postponed due to waterlogged pitch

5 January 2020 10	Manchester United	0–1	Bristol City	Leigh
12:00	James (yellow card) 38'; Toone (yellow card) 90+4'	Report	Salmon 34'; Evans (yellow card) 38'; Hughes (yellow card) 82'; Chance (yellow card) 90+4'	Stadium: Leigh Sports Village; Attendance: 2,021; Referee: Lucy Oliver

12 January 2020 11	Chelsea	6–1	Bristol City	Kingston upon Thames
14:00	England 28', 82'; Blundell 40'; Carter 45', (yellow card) 90+3'; Ji 45+2', 50'; Bright (yellow card) 74'	Report	Salmon 15'; Pattinson (yellow card) 70'	Stadium: Kingsmeadow; Attendance: 2,866; Referee: Emily Heaslip

19 January 2020 12	Bristol City	0–1	Liverpool	Filton
15:00	Salmon (yellow card) 90+2'	Report	Furness 13'; Roberts (yellow card) 59'	Stadium: Stoke Gifford Stadium; Attendance: 1,007; Referee: Savvas Yianni

2 February 2020	Tottenham Hotspur	P–P	Bristol City	Canons Park
14:00				Stadium: The Hive Stadium
Note: Postponed due to waterlogged pitch

9 February 2020	Bristol City	P–P	Reading	Filton
15:00				Stadium: Stoke Gifford Stadium
Note: All WSL games postponed due to adverse weather conditions

12 February 2020 13	Manchester City	1–0	Bristol City	Manchester
19:00	Bonner 2'; Wullaert (yellow card) 80'	Report		Stadium: Academy Stadium; Attendance: 858; Referee: Lucy Oliver

23 February 2020 14	Birmingham City	0–1	Bristol City	Solihull
14:00		Report	Bryson (yellow card) 66'; Salmon 75'	Stadium: Damson Park; Attendance: 659; Referee: Stacey Pearson

22 March 2020 15	Bristol City	Cancelled	Arsenal	Filton
15:00				Stadium: Stoke Gifford Stadium
Note: Cancelled due to coronavirus pandemic

29 March 2020 16	Brighton & Hove Albion	Cancelled	Bristol City	Crawley
14:00				Stadium: Broadfield Stadium
Note: Cancelled due to coronavirus pandemic

5 April 2020 17	Bristol City	Cancelled	Everton	Filton
15:00				Stadium: Stoke Gifford Stadium
Note: Cancelled due to coronavirus pandemic

25 April 2020 18	Bristol City	Cancelled	Manchester United	Bristol
13:00				Stadium: Ashton Gate
Note: Cancelled due to coronavirus pandemic

3 May 2020 19	Bristol City	Cancelled	West Ham United	Filton
15:00				Stadium: Stoke Gifford Stadium
Note: Rescheduled from 15 December 2019. Cancelled due to coronavirus pandemic

10 May 2020 20	Bristol City	Cancelled	Reading	Filton
15:00				Stadium: Stoke Gifford Stadium
Note: Rescheduled from 9 February 2020. Cancelled due to coronavirus pandemic

16 May 2020 21	West Ham United	Cancelled	Bristol City	Romford
15:00				Stadium: Rush Green Stadium
Note: Cancelled due to coronavirus pandemic

22	Tottenham Hotspur	Cancelled	Bristol City	Canons Park
				Stadium: The Hive Stadium
Note: Rescheduled from 2 February 2020. Cancelled due to coronavirus pandemic

=== League table ===
Pos	Team	Pld	W	D	L	GF	GA	GD	Pts	PPG	Qualification
8	West Ham United	14	5	1	8	19	34	−15	16	1.14	
9	Brighton & Hove Albion	16	3	4	9	11	30	−19	13	0.81	
10	Bristol City	14	2	3	9	9	38	−29	9	0.64	
11	Birmingham City	13	2	1	10	5	23	−18	7	0.54	
12	Liverpool (R)	14	1	3	10	8	20	−12	6	0.43	Relegation to the Championship

Source: FA WSL, BBC
Rules for classification: Initially: 1) Points; 2) Goal difference; 3) Number of goals scored. After abandonment of season: 1) Points per game
(R) Relegated

== Women's FA Cup ==
As a member of the top two tiers, Bristol City entered the FA Cup in the fourth round, beating Championship side Durham in extra-time to progress to the next round. They were drawn against fellow WSL side Everton in the fifth round with the game moved to Ashton Gate, the second match of the season to be moved to the men's stadium after the season opener.

26 January 2020 Fourth round	Bristol City	1–0 (a.e.t.)	Durham	Filton
	Robinson 103'	Report		Stadium: Stoke Gifford Stadium

17 February 2020 Fifth round	Bristol City	0–5	Everton	Bristol
		Report	Kaagman 8', 53'; Morgan 18'; Graham 39'; Cain 59'	Stadium: Ashton Gate; Attendance: 1,889

== FA Women's League Cup ==
=== Group stage ===
22 September 2019 Group stage	Bristol City	3–0	London Bees	Filton
15:00	Humphrey 7'; Salmon 15'; Allen (yellow card) 45'; Harrison 90'	Report		Stadium: Stoke Gifford Stadium; Attendance: 337; Referee: Elizabeth Simms

20 October 2019 Group stage	Brighton & Hove Albion	1–2	Bristol City	Crawley
14:00	Green 60' (pen.)	Report	Harrison 9'; Salmon 45+2'	Stadium: Broadfield Stadium

3 November 2019 Group stage	Bristol City	1–1 (3–4 p)	London City Lionesses	Filton
15:00	Wellings 65'	Report	Cowan 17'; Bennett (yellow card) 78'	Stadium: Stoke Gifford Stadium; Attendance: 317; Referee: Rick Hulme
	Penalties
	Baggaley (penalty scored); Wellings (penalty scored); Chance (penalty missed); Salmon (penalty scored); Humphrey (penalty missed)		(penalty missed) Kemppi; (penalty scored) Susanna; (penalty scored) Fitzgerald; (penalty scored) Ejupi; (penalty scored) Wilson

21 November 2019 Group stage	Arsenal	7–0	Bristol City	Borehamwood
19:30	Little 33', 52'; Roord 45'; Miedema 57', 76'; Nobbs 87'; Beattie 90'	Report		Stadium: Meadow Park; Attendance: 805; Referee: Louise Saunders

11 December 2019 Group stage	Charlton Athletic	2–5	Bristol City	Bexley
19:45	Devlin 32', 90'; Gotch (yellow card) 55'	Report	Salmon 15'; Wellings 61'; Robinson 70'; van der Linden 80'; Wilson 83'	Stadium: The Oakwood; Attendance: 114

Pos	Team	Pld	W	WPEN	LPEN	L	GF	GA	GD	Pts	Qualification	ARS	BHA	BRI	LON	CHA	LCL
1	Arsenal	5	4	0	1	0	25	0	+25	13	Advance to Knock-out stage	—	—	7–0	9–0	4–0	—
2	Brighton & Hove Albion	5	3	1	0	1	13	4	+9	11	Advance to Knock-out stage	0–0	—	1–2	—	—	—
3	Bristol City	5	3	0	1	1	11	11	0	10		—	—	—	3–0	—	1–1
4	London Bees	5	1	1	0	3	3	17	−14	5		—	0–5	—	—	0–0	—
5	Charlton Athletic	5	1	0	1	3	3	12	−9	4		—	0–3	2–5	—	—	1–0
6	London City Lionesses	5	0	1	0	4	3	14	−11	2		0–5	2–4	—	0–3	—	—

Source: playmakerstats.com
Rules for classification: 1) Points; 2) Goal difference; 3) Number of goals scored; 4) Number of wins; 5) Head-to-head record

== Squad statistics ==
=== Appearances ===
Starting appearances are listed first, followed by substitute appearances after the + symbol where applicable.

No.	Pos	Nat	Player	Total		FA WSL		FA Cup		League Cup	
No.	Pos	Nat	Player	Apps	Goals	Apps	Goals	Apps	Goals	Apps	Goals
1	GK	(England) ENG	Sophie Baggaley	20	0	14	0	2	0	4	0
2	DF	(Wales) WAL	Loren Dykes	12	0	10+1	0	0	0	1	0
3	DF	(Wales) WAL	Gemma Evans	19	0	11+1	0	2	0	5	0
4	DF	(England) ENG	Jasmine Matthews	17	0	13	0	1	0	3	0
5	DF	(Scotland) SCO	Frankie Brown	19	0	13	0	2	0	3+1	0
6	MF	(Australia) AUS	Chloe Logarzo	1	0	1	0	0	0	0	0
7	DF	(England) ENG	Poppy Pattinson	8	0	6	0	2	0	0	0
8	MF	(England) ENG	Carla Humphrey	11	1	8	0	0	0	3	1
9	FW	(England) ENG	Ebony Salmon	21	8	7+7	5	1+1	0	5	3
10	FW	(Belgium) BEL	Yana Daniëls	19	2	13+1	2	2	0	2+1	0
11	FW	(England) ENG	Charlie Wellings	20	3	13	1	2	0	3+2	2
12	DF	(England) ENG	Flo Allen	12	0	3+3	0	0+1	0	4+1	0
13	GK	(Scotland) SCO	Eartha Cumings	1	0	0	0	0	0	1	0
14	FW	(South Korea) KOR	Jeon Ga-eul	4	0	2	0	2	0	0	0
15	MF	(Wales) WAL	Megan Wynne	5	0	0+3	0	1+1	0	0	0
16	DF	(England) ENG	Meaghan Sargeant	16	0	12	0	0	0	4	0
18	MF	(England) ENG	Maisy Collis	2	0	0+1	0	0	0	0+1	0
19	MF	(England) ENG	Katie Robinson	16	2	3+6	0	1+1	1	3+2	1
20	MF	(England) ENG	Georgia Wilson	13	1	5+3	0	0	0	3+2	1
21	FW	(Scotland) SCO	Abi Harrison	9	3	5+1	1	0	0	1+2	2
23	FW	(Wales) WAL	Elise Hughes	3	0	2+1	0	0	0	0	0
25	MF	(New Zealand) NZL	Olivia Chance	20	0	10+4	0	2	0	4	0
26	DF	(England) ENG	Faye Bryson	5	0	2+1	0	2	0	0	0
27	FW	(England) ENG	Jessica Wooley	0	0	0	0	0	0	0	0
Players away from the club on loan:
10	FW	(England) ENG	Ella Rutherford	0	0	0	0	0	0	0	0
Players who appeared for Bristol City but left during the season:
6	MF	(Netherlands) NED	Vita van der Linden	4	1	1	0	0	0	3	1
14	MF	(Scotland) SCO	Kirsten Reilly	4	0	0+1	0	0	0	3	0
17	MF	(England) ENG	Ellie Strippel	0	0	0	0	0	0	0	0

=== Goalscorers ===
Rank	No.	Pos.	Name	FA WSL	FA Cup	League Cup	Total
1	9	FW	(England) Ebony Salmon	5	0	3	8
2	11	FW	(England) Charlie Wellings	1	0	2	3
2	21	FW	(Scotland) Abi Harrison	1	0	2	3
4	10	FW	(Belgium) Yana Daniëls	2	0	0	2
4	19	MF	(England) Katie Robinson	0	1	1	2
6	6	MF	(Netherlands) Vita van der Linden	0	0	1	1
6	8	MF	(England) Carla Humphrey	0	0	1	1
6	20	MF	(England) Georgia Wilson	0	0	1	1
Total				9	1	11	21

== Transfers ==
=== Transfers in ===
Date	Position	Nationality	Name	From	Ref.
28 May 2019	DF	(England)	Meaghan Sargeant	(England) Birmingham City	
28 May 2019	FW	(England)	Charlie Wellings	(England) Birmingham City	
12 July 2019	FW	(Belgium)	Yana Daniëls	(England) Liverpool	
12 July 2019	DF	(England)	Jasmine Matthews	(England) Liverpool	
15 July 2019	FW	(England)	Ebony Salmon	(England) Manchester United	
23 July 2019	MF	(Netherlands)	Vita van der Linden	(Netherlands) Ajax	
3 September 2019	MF	(New Zealand)	Olivia Chance	(England) Everton	
13 September 2019	MF	(Scotland)	Kirsten Reilly	(Scotland) Hibernian	
18 January 2020	DF	(England)	Faye Bryson	(England) Everton	
18 January 2020	FW	(South Korea)	Jeon Ga-eul	(South Korea) Hwacheon KSPO	
23 January 2020	MF	(Australia)	Chloe Logarzo	(Australia) Sydney FC	

=== Loans in ===
Date	Position	Nationality	Name	From	Until	Ref.
4 January 2020	FW	(Wales)	Elise Hughes	(England) Everton	30 January 2020	
18 January 2020	MF	(Wales)	Megan Wynne	(England) Tottenham Hotspur	End of season	

=== Transfers out ===
Date	Position	Nationality	Name	To	Ref.
17 May 2019	MF	(Belgium)	Julie Biesmans	(Netherlands) PSV Eindhoven	
17 May 2019	MF	(Scotland)	Lucy Graham	(England) Everton	
17 May 2019	DF	(Netherlands)	Danique Kerkdijk	(England) Brighton & Hove Albion	
17 May 2019	FW	(Finland)	Juliette Kemppi	(England) London City Lionesses	
17 May 2019	MF	(England)	Ali Johnson	(England) Sheffield United	
5 July 2019	FW	(England)	Rosella Ayane	(England) Tottenham Hotspur	
5 July 2019	FW	(Republic of Ireland)	Heather Payne	(United States) Florida State Seminoles	
6 August 2019	GK	(Wales)	Aimee Watson	(England) Oxford United	
15 August 2019	MF	(England)	Poppy Wilson	(England) London City Lionesses	
21 December 2019	MF	(Scotland)	Kirsten Reilly	(Scotland) Rangers	
12 January 2020	MF	(England)	Ellie Strippel	(England) Yeovil Town	
24 January 2020	MF	(Netherlands)	Vita van der Linden	(France) Stade de Reims	

=== Loans out ===
Date	Position	Nationality	Name	To	Until	Ref.
6 September 2019	FW	(England)	Ella Rutherford	(England) Crystal Palace	6 January 2020	
6 January 2020	FW	(England)	Ella Rutherford	(England) Leicester City	End of season	
