= Maisy Collis =

English footballer

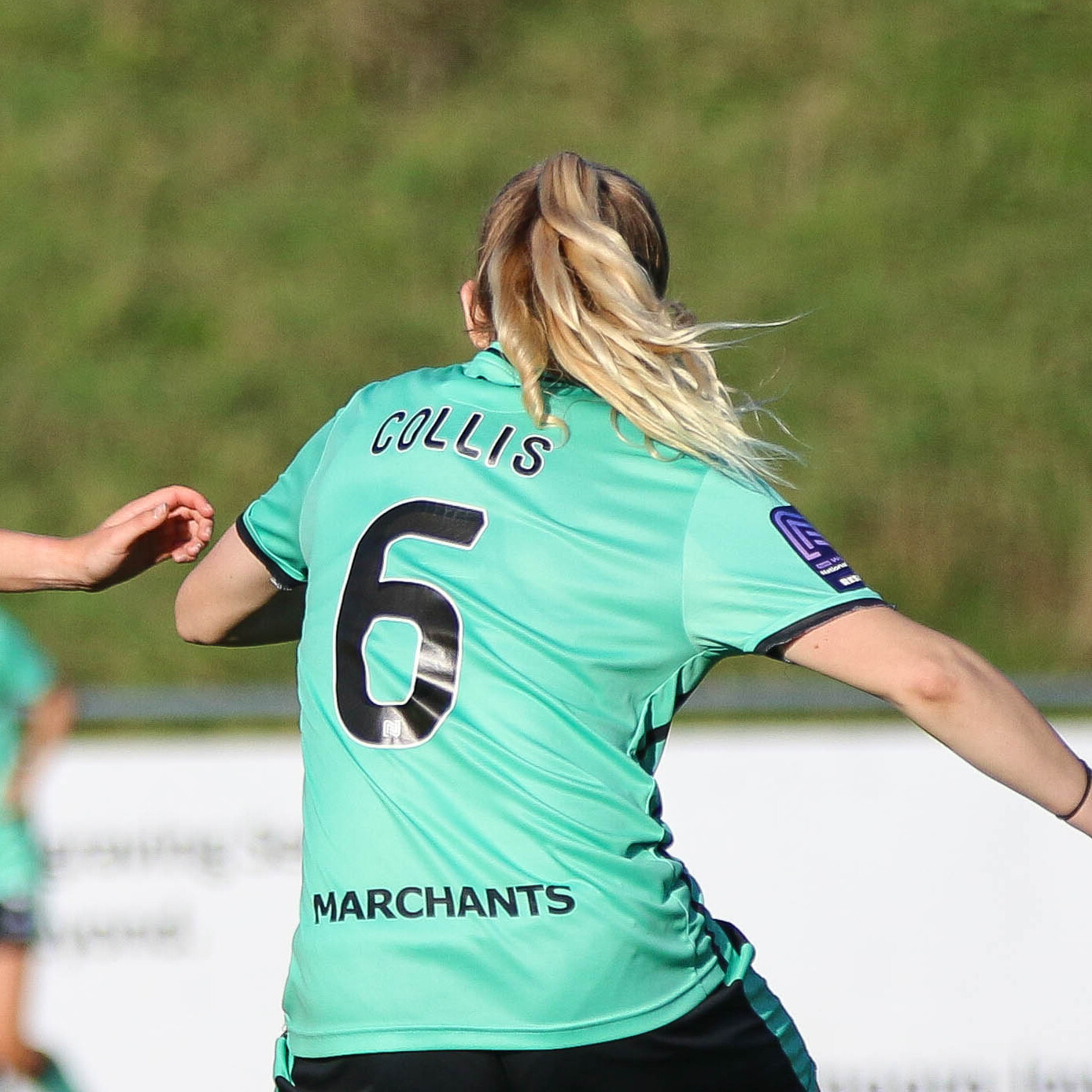
- in 2024

Personal information
- Full name: Maisy Collis
- Date of birth: 23 January 2002 (age 24)
- Place of birth: England
- Position: Midfielder

Team information
- Current team: Cheltenham Town
- Number: 18

Youth career
- 2014–2022: Bristol City

Senior career*
Years	Team	Apps	(Gls)
2019–2022	Bristol City	1	(0)
2022–	Cheltenham Town	38	(1)
- * Club domestic league appearances and goals as of 14:52, 1 October 2023 (UTC)

Maisy Collis (born 23 January 2002) is an English professional footballer who plays as a midfielder for Cheltenham Town of the FA Women's National League South.

== Club career ==
=== Bristol City ===
Collis joined the Bristol City RTC aged 10 and was part of the academy team that contested the WSL Academy Plate final against Liverpool in April 2019. She was promoted to the first team during the 2019–20 season, making her senior debut on 21 November 2019, entering as a 64th minute substitute in a 7–0 League Cup group stage defeat away to Arsenal. She made her WSL debut against the same opposition on 1 December 2019, a game Arsenal won by a record 11–1 scoreline.

== Career statistics ==
=== Club ===
Club	Season	League			FA Cup		League Cup		Other		Total	
Club	Season	Division	Apps	Goals	Apps	Goals	Apps	Goals	Apps	Goals	Apps	Goals
Bristol City	2019–20	FA WSL	1	0	0	0	1	0	0	0	2	0
Bristol City	2020–21	FA WSL	0	0	0	0	1	0	0	0	1	0
Bristol City	2021–22	Championship	0	0	0	0	1	0	0	0	1	0
Bristol City	Total		1	0	0	0	3	0	0	0	4	0
Cheltenham Town	2022-23	FA WNL S	22	0	1	0	5	1	1 (Note: Appearances in the FA Women's National League Plate)	0	29	1
Cheltenham Town	2023-24	FA WNL S	16	0	0	0	0	0	1 (Note: Appearances in the FA Women's National League Cup)	0	17	0
	Total		38	0	1	0	5	1	2	0	46	0
Career Total			39	0	1	0	8	1	2	0	50	1
