= 2019–20 Arsenal W.F.C. season =

English women's football club season

Arsenal Women
2019–20 season
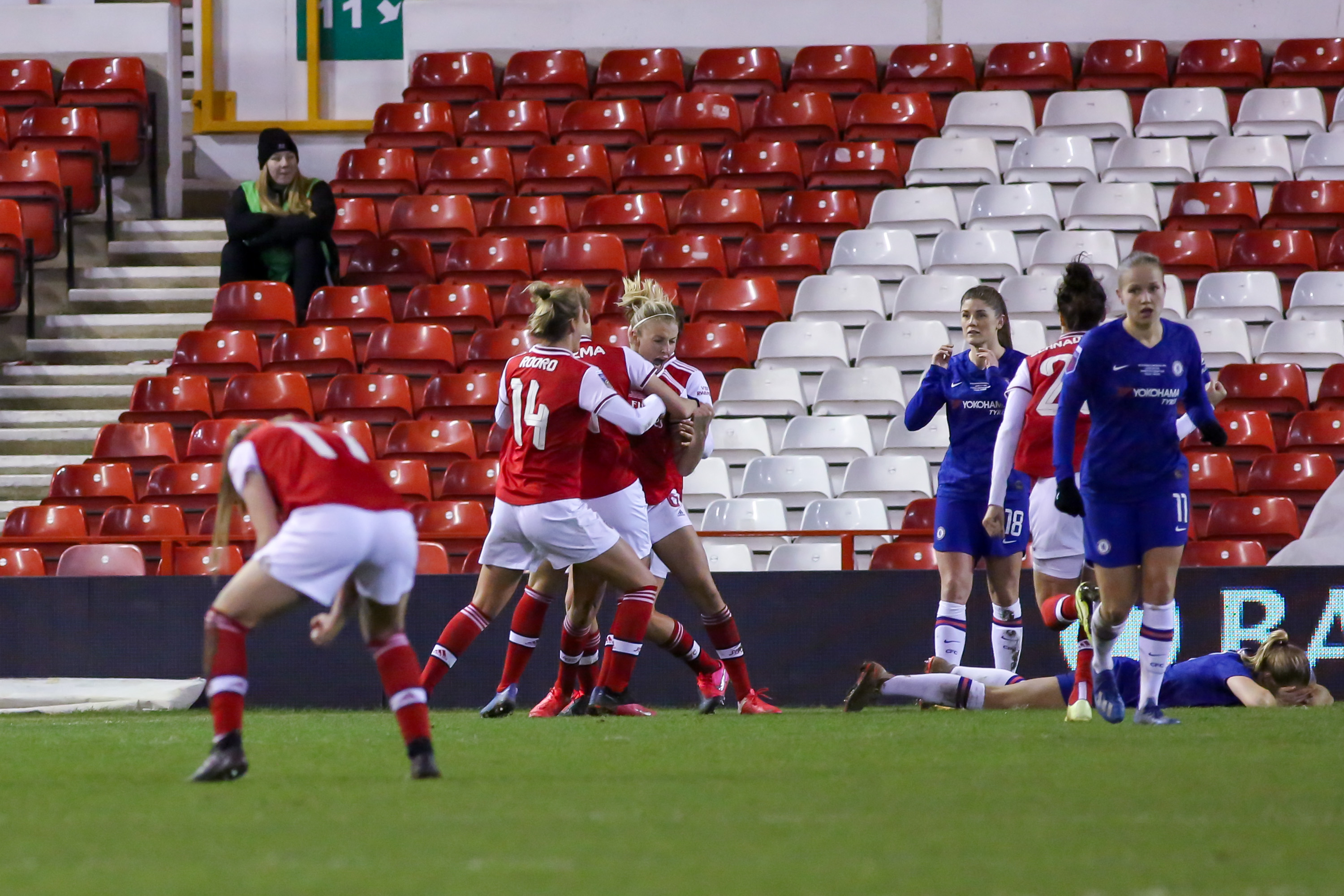
- Arsenal celebrating after Leah Williamson scores in the League Cup final
- Owner: Kroenke Sports & Entertainment
- Chairman: Chips Keswick (until 28 May)
- Manager: Joe Montemurro
- Stadium: Meadow Park
- WSL: 3rd
- FA Cup: Semi-finals
- League Cup: Runners-up
- Champions League: Quarter-finals
- Top goalscorer: League: Vivianne Miedema (16); All: Vivianne Miedema (29)
- Highest home attendance: 4,000 (vs Chelsea, 24 January 2020)
- Lowest home attendance: 595 (vs Fiorentina, Champions League, 26 September 2019)
- Average home league attendance: 2,209
- Biggest win: 11–1 (vs Bristol City (H), WSL, 1 December 2019)
- Biggest defeat: 1–4 (vs Chelsea (H), WSL, 24 January 2020)
Home colours	Away colours	Third colours
- All statistics correct as of 29 February 2020.

2019–20 Arsenal W.F.C. season
Home colours	Away colours	Third colours
- All statistics correct as of 16 May 2021.

The 2019–20 season was Arsenal Women's Football Club's 33rd season of competitive football. The club participated in the Champions League, the WSL, the FA Cup and the League Cup. The club were the defending WSL champions. Arsenal were unable to defend their title, finishing third after the season was curtailed early due to the COVID-19 pandemic. The reached the League Cup Final, where they lost to Chelsea. The FA Cup was temporarily suspended, and then continued again during the 2020-21 season. Arsenal reached the Semi Finals, where they were knocked out by Manchester City. Their European campaign ended at the quarter-final stage, losing 2-1 to Paris Saint-Germain in a one-off tie.

Due to the FA Cup and the UWCL being spread over two different seasons, because of the COVID-19 Pandemic, the team wore two different sets of kits this season.

== Review ==
=== Background ===
The 2019–20 season came off the back of the 2019 FIFA Women's World Cup which was played in France. A total of ten Gunners were competing at the World Cup with five different countries. Both Scotland and The Netherlands both had three Arsenal players in their roster: Jen Beattie, Kim Little and Lisa Evans for Scotland and Daniëlle van de Donk, Jill Roord and Vivianne Miedema for The Netherlands. Leah Williamson and Beth Mead were in the England squad while Pauline Peyraud-Magnin played for hosts France and Leonie Maier for Germany.

The Dutch got the furthest in the tournament, ultimately being defeated 2–0 by the United States in the final winning them the silver medal in only their second World Cup appearance. England got fourth place after losing the third place play-off against Sweden 1–2. France got knocked out in the quarter-finals by the United States (1–2), Germany was beaten 1–2 by Sweden in the quarter-finals and Scotland was not able to get out of their group.

=== Pre-season ===
The first pre-season friendly was against Bayern Munich in the Emirates Cup on 28 July, played in the Emirates Stadium. The women's team played this as a double-header with the men, who played Olympique Lyonnais later that afternoon. The team were still missing their Dutch and English internationals, who were not yet in training as they just returned from holiday after playing in the later stages of the World Cup. Aside from those missing internationals, the team had only been in pre-season for one and a half weeks whilst Bayern's season would start in a few weeks. Bayern won the match 0–1, with Melanie Leupolz heading in a free-kick in the first half. The match was overshadowed by Danielle Carter going off the field on a stretcher late in the second half. It was later revealed that she had sustained an ACL injury, which will keep her off the pitch for a long time. This just after she had come back from an ACL injury for which she had been out for almost a year.

Coach Joe Montemurro admitted that the game came a bit too early in their pre-season, but that it was a great occasion to showcase the women's game to a bigger crowd. He would've liked to come up against opposition of this kind a bit further into the pre-season, but the chance came along to be part of the Emirates Cup. It was important though to make sure the World Cup players were given a good rest before starting pre-season at the club.

The first part of pre-season included the previously mentioned match against Bayern and further friendlies against VfL Wolfsburg (two-time Champions League winner and 2018-19 quarter-finalist) and FC Barcelona (2018-19 Champions League finalist). A 3–0 defeat against the current German champions in the Austrian mountains and a 2–5 defeat at home against Barça showed that the team still has work to do in order to prepare for the upcoming European season. One of the issues seems the absence of Lia Wälti, who is still recovering from a knee injury. She plays as defensive midfielder and Joe Montemurro has attempted to work around her injury by trying other players on that position or other formations, but none seem to have had the desired effect - a problem that will need solving before the season begins.

After going head-to-head against the best European teams, Montemurro's team went on to play two more friendlies to prepare for the domestic season. They first played West Ham United behind closed doors, winning it 2–0. The final pre-season game came on 25 August against North London rivals Tottenham Hotspur which was won 6–0 with a hat-trick by new signing Jill Roord and further goals by fellow new signing Jen Beattie, 2018/19 topscorer Vivianne Miedema and Jordan Nobbs, who returned to the pitch after being out since November 2018 with an ACL injury.

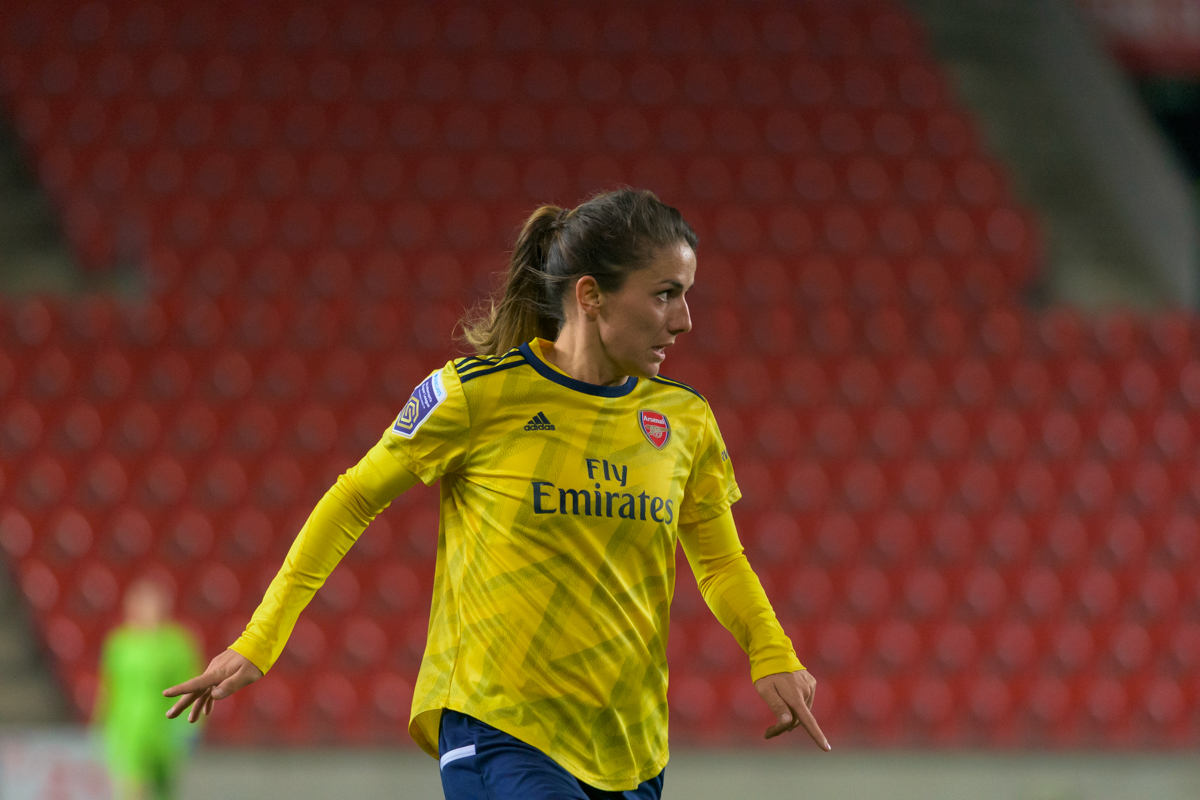
Daniëlle van de Donk (pictured against Slavia Praha) scored the only goal in the 89th minute of the away tie against Manchester United.

=== September–November ===
The Gunners' season started in September with a home game against West Ham United (8 September), which saw the official debuts of Jill Roord, Leonie Maier and Manuela Zinsberger – Jen Beattie made her second debut for the club. Beth Mead put Arsenal ahead after 14 minutes and Roord scored on her debut before half-time. A second half goal by Martha Thomas saw West Ham bring the score to 2–1 and they could've leveled it just before the end of the match when they were awarded an indirect free-kick after Arsenal goalkeeper Zinsberger picked up what the referee perceived to be a backpass, but the shot was saved by Zinsberger.

On 16 September the Gunners traveled to Leigh Sports Village to play newly promoted Championship champions Manchester United. It was a very tight match, with good chances on both sides: Jane Ross had her promising attack stopped by Zinsberger and Miedema saw her attempts frustrated by Mary Earps. A 89th-minute goal from Daniëlle van de Donk proving to be the difference between the two teams that evening, the fixture ending in 0–1 and Arsenal maintaining their good start to the league season.

Brighton & Hove Albion visited Meadow Park on 29 September for the third league game of the season. The Gunners ran out clear 4–0 victors, with Little, Miedema, Van de Donk and Nobbs all bagging one goal each. Besides scoring one goal, Miedema also assisted the goals for Little and Van de Donk.

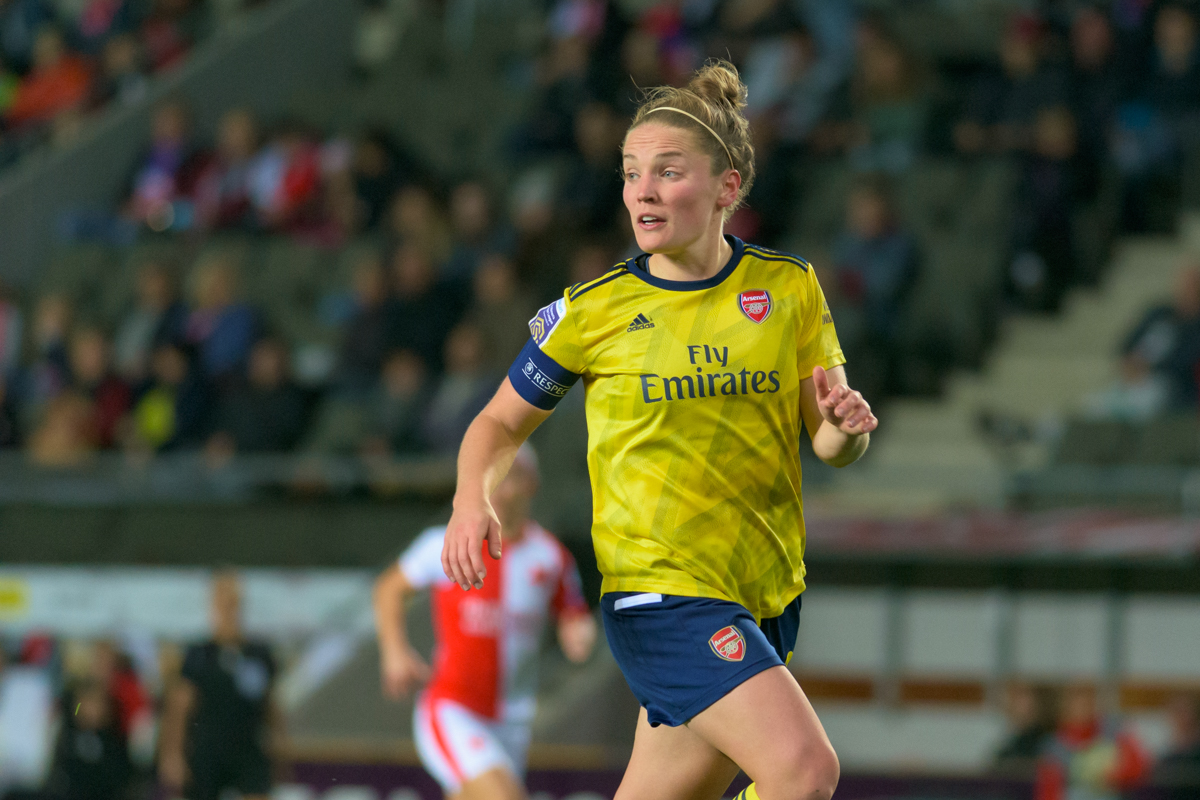
Captain Kim Little scored a penalty in both Champions League ties against Slavia Praha.

After the October international break, Arsenal visited Chelsea at Kingsmeadow on 13 October. The Gunners took the early lead through a Van de Donk goal but seemed disjointed and underperforming in the second half, allowing in two Chelsea goals causing the first defeat this season and ending their run of 11 matches unbeaten. As a result of the 2–1 defeat, the team dropped down to third in the league rankings. Manchester City came to Arsenal's home on 27 October. City were the only side who hadn't dropped any points in the league yet and were on top of the league. Great play between Little and Miedema saw the latter score her 49th goal in as many starts for the club, slotting the ball low past City goalkeeper Ellie Roebuck. Her goal turned out to be the only one in the game, though Nobbs came very close in the latter stages of the second half, but missed an absolute sitter a few yards from the goal. With the 1–0 victory, Arsenal moved up to second, just one point behind Chelsea.

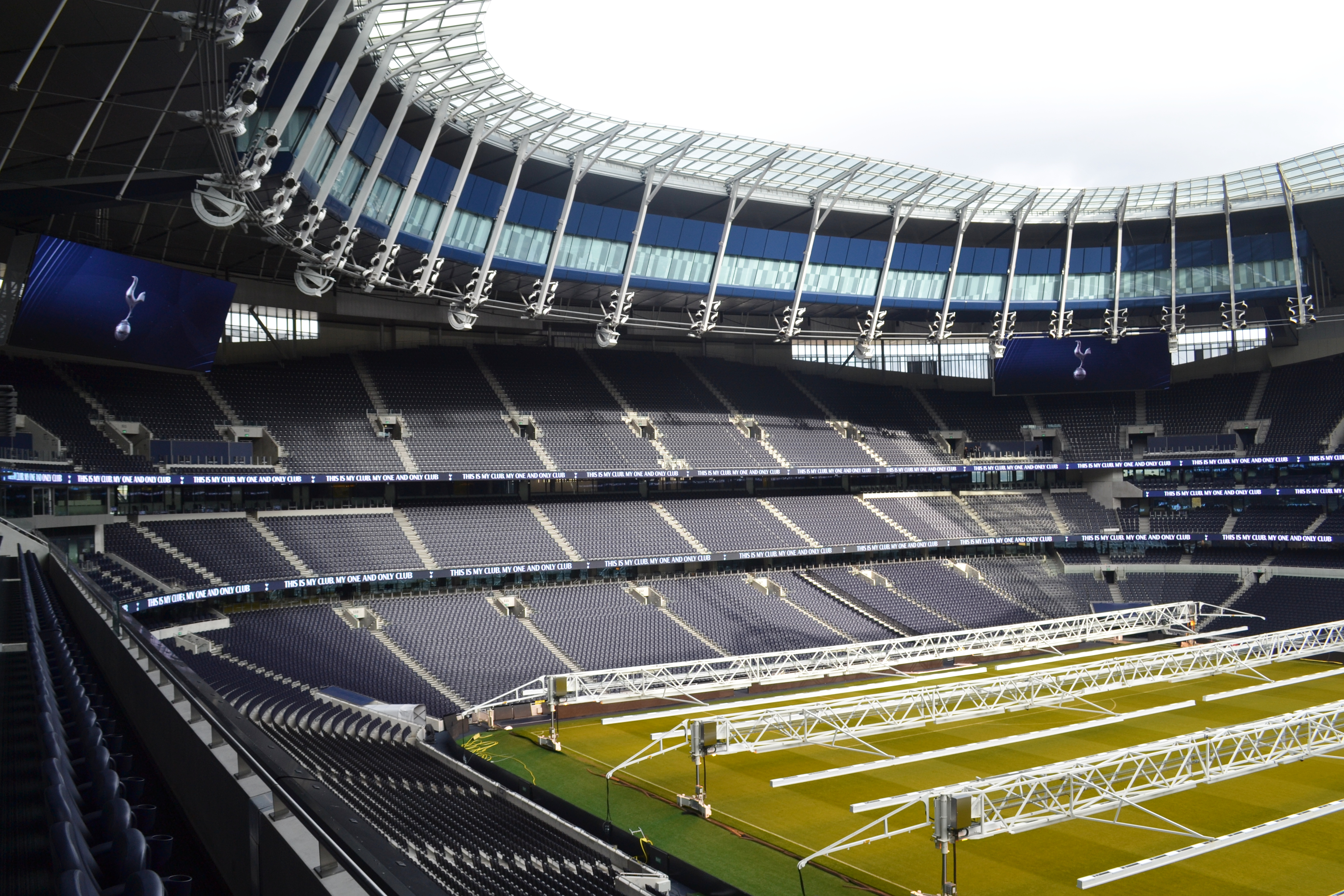
The Tottenham Hotspur Stadium played host to the first WSL North London Derby, turning out a record 38,262 spectators.

After the international break, the Gunners played Tottenham Hotspur on 17 November in the first women's league North London Derby, at the new Tottenham Hotspur Stadium. The first half was pretty even between Arsenal and rivals Spurs, but in the end a league record crowd of 38,262 saw Arsenal win 2–0, thanks to second-half goals from Little and Miedema.

The last game of November, on the 24th was against bottom of the league Liverpool. Although standing last in the league, Liverpool hadn't conceded many goals throughout the season. This game was no different, a first-half goal by Miedema making the difference to decide this match: 1–0.

=== December–February ===
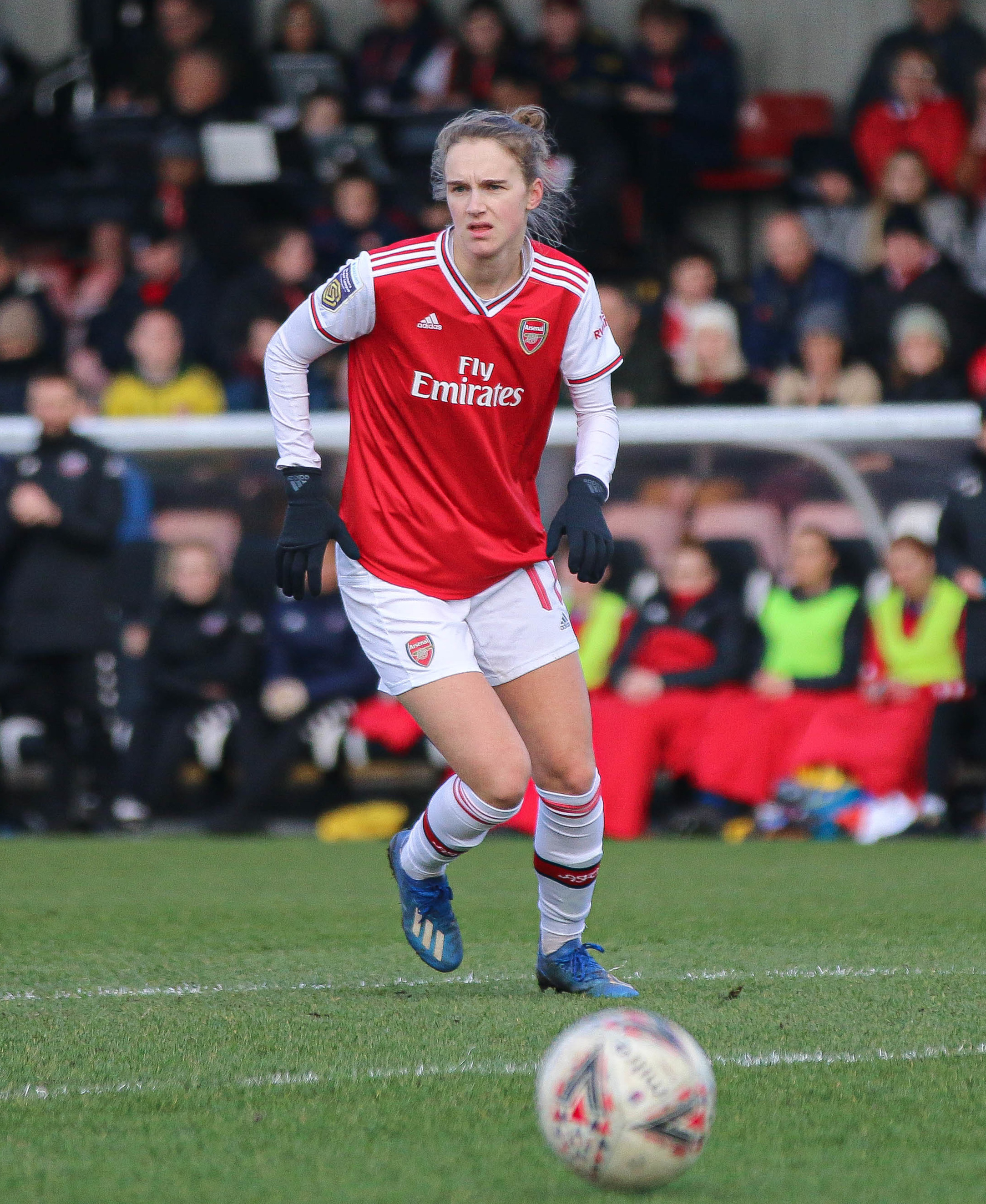
Vivianne Miedema (pictured against Lewes) scored six goals and assisted four against Bristol City. She claimed the league's topscorer title for the second year running.

When Bristol City returned to Meadow Park for the league on 1 December, Arsenal continued where they left off in the League Cup 10 days prior. In a new record win for the WSL, the Gunners put 11 goals past Bristol, in what could only be described as a Miedema masterclass. In her 70 minutes on the pitch, she scored six and assisted another four goals: two scored by Evans, and one each by Williamson and Nobbs. Miedema was thus involved in all ten goals scored when she was on the pitch. After being substituted, two further goals were scored: one by Mitchell - who substituted on for Miedema and one by Bristol's Yana Daniels, who put away a penalty rebound ending the game in 11–1.

A week later on 8 December Arsenal went to Adams Park to take on Reading in the league. After a slow start (first 30 minutes) in which Reading played a high press, making it difficult for Arsenal to execute their game plan, Miedema was the first to score. Ten minutes later Little finished a superbe team-goal, engineered by her with one-touch passing between her, Nobbs and Williamson. After the break, not much changed for the scoreline until the first minute of extra time when Miedema dinked the ball over the keeper into the net after a long pass by Van de Donk, ending the game in 0–3.

In the last game of 2019, Arsenal traveled to Everton on 15 December for their league game. Game started off well, Miedema scoring the first inside 15 minutes. Halfway through the first half, Gabrielle George collided with Mead causing the latter to be stretchered off the field, letting Arsenal fans - all to familiar with injuries over the last seasons - fear the worst. The second half produced the result: a Little penalty, another Miedema goal and an Everton goal by Chloe Kelly ending the game in 1–3. Luckily for the Gunners, Arsenal later reported that after taking x-rays of her leg, Mead's injuries weren't as bad as they seemed during the game - only sustaining bruising to her lower leg.

The new year started off with a visit by Birmingham City to Meadow Park on 5 January. A first-half goal each from Little and Nobbs resulting in a 2–0 win. The Birmingham side had been a mainstay in the top four for recent seasons, but managerial changes and important players transferring out has left the club fighting to stay up thus far this season.

A week later (12 January), the Gunners traveled to Brighton & Hove Albion. In the reverse fixture, Arsenal had beaten the Seagulls 4–0 and this match had the same result: first-half goals by Van de Donk and Roord and second-half goals by Nobbs and Mead ensuring another 0–4 win.

On 19 January, the Gunners welcomed Chelsea to Meadow Park. The first 20 minutes from the visitors was an onslaught, striking three times - by England, Kerr and Ingle, leaving the Gunners no chance to get into the game. Reiten scored a fourth in the second-half before Mead got a consolation goal. Manager Montemurro later admitted that he got the tactics wrong in attempting to press a bit higher up the pitch and stop them from playing through the middle and to create overloads in the middle of the park, which allowed Chelsea to easily attack from the sides.

Arsenal visited the Academy Stadium on 2 February to play Manchester City for the league, only four days after their League Cup semi-final victory. This time around though the roles are reversed with City scoring two goals around half time. Van de Donk put one in the back of the net halfway through the second half to produce the result: 2–1.

After the little snag in the Gunners' league campaign, they visited Liverpool on 13 February. Liverpool went a goal up early in the first half via Babajide. Miedema scored the equalizer halfway through, for Nobbs to add to the tally just minutes later. Just before half-time, Liverpool drew back level via Furness to go 2–2 into the break. Late in the second half, Arsenal were able to get the result they wanted: Miedema scoring to end the game 3–2.

=== Season curtailed due to COVID-19 ===
Due to the COVID-19 pandemic, the FA decided to suspend the league on 13 March, first until April but later indefinitively. On 25 May it was announced that the season will not be continued, with the end standings determined on 5 June based on points per game, resulting in a third place for Arsenal. The season's Champions League play-offs will be played in August, while the FA Cup will be finished in September.

== Squad information & statistics ==
=== First team squad ===
No.	Name	Date of Birth (Age)	Since	Last Contract	Signed From
Goalkeepers
1	(Austria) Manuela Zinsberger	19 October 1995 (aged 24)	2019	May 2019	(Germany) Bayern Munich
18	(France) Pauline Peyraud-Magnin	17 March 1992 (aged 28)	2018	July 2018	(France) Lyon
18	(Australia) Lydia Williams ‡	13 May 1988 (aged 32)	2020	July 2020	(Australia) Melbourne City
24	(England) Fran Stenson	27 April 2001 (aged 19)	2019	August 2019	(England) Manchester City
Defenders
2	(Denmark) Katrine Veje	19 June 1991 (aged 29)	2019	January 2019	(France) Montpellier
3	(Scotland) Emma Mitchell	19 September 1992 (aged 27)	2013	April 2018	(Germany) SGS Essen
3	(England) Lotte Wubben-Moy ‡	11 January 1999 (aged 21)	2020	September 2020	(United States) University of North Carolina
5	(Scotland) Jen Beattie	13 May 1991 (aged 29)	2019	June 2019	(England) Manchester City
6	(England) Leah Williamson	29 March 1997 (aged 23)	2014	March 2018	(England) Arsenal Academy
12	(Australia) Steph Catley ‡	26 January 1994 (aged 26)	2020	July 2020	(Australia) Melbourne City
16	(Republic of Ireland) Louise Quinn	17 June 1990 (aged 30)	2017	May 2019	(England) Notts County
16	(Switzerland) Noelle Maritz ‡	23 December 1995 (aged 24)	2020	July 2020	(Germany) Wolfsburg
20	(Germany) Leonie Maier	29 September 1992 (aged 27)	2019	May 2019	(Germany) Bayern Munich
21	(Germany) Tabea Kemme	14 December 1991 (aged 28)	2018	July 2018	(Germany) Turbine Potsdam
22	(Austria) Viktoria Schnaderbeck	4 January 1991 (aged 29)	2018	June 2020	(Germany) Bayern Munich
30	(England) Ruby Mace ‡	5 September 2003 (aged 16)	2020		(England) Arsenal Academy
	(England) Gracie Pearse	13 September 2002 (aged 17)	2019		(England) Arsenal Academy
Midfielders
7	(Netherlands) Daniëlle van de Donk	5 August 1991 (aged 28)	2015	March 2019	(Sweden) Kopparbergs/Göteborg FC
8	(England) Jordan Nobbs	8 December 1992 (aged 27)	2010	April 2020	(England) Sunderland
10	(Scotland) Kim Little (c)	29 June 1990 (aged 30)	2016	August 2019	(United States) Seattle Reign
13	(Switzerland) Lia Wälti	19 April 1993 (aged 27)	2018	December 2019	(Germany) Turbine Potsdam
14	(Netherlands) Jill Roord	22 April 1997 (aged 23)	2019	May 2019	(Germany) Bayern Munich
21	(Switzerland) Malin Gut ‡	2 August 2000 (aged 19)	2020	July 2020	(Switzerland) Grasshopper
26	(England) Ruby Grant	15 April 2002 (aged 18)	2018		(England) Arsenal Academy
27	(England) Mel Filis	30 July 2002 (aged 17)	2018		(England) Arsenal Academy
28	(Mexico) Silvana Flores	18 April 2002 (aged 18)	2019		(England) Arsenal Academy
31	(England) Hannah Dawbarn		2018		(England) Arsenal Academy
33	(Portugal) Ana Albuquerque	3 July 2002 (aged 17)	2018		(England) Arsenal Academy
Forwards
9	(England) Danielle Carter	18 May 1993 (aged 27)	2009	August 2017	(England) Sunderland
11	(Netherlands) Vivianne Miedema	15 July 1996 (aged 23)	2017	December 2018	(Germany) Bayern Munich
15	(Republic of Ireland) Katie McCabe	21 September 1995 (aged 24)	2015	March 2019	(Republic of Ireland) Shelbourne
17	(Scotland) Lisa Evans	21 May 1995 (aged 25)	2017	December 2018	(Germany) Bayern Munich
19	(Australia) Caitlin Foord	11 November 1994 (aged 25)	2020	January 2020	(Australia) Sydney FC
23	(England) Beth Mead	9 May 1995 (aged 25)	2017	November 2019	(England) Sunderland

Italic indicates an academy player.

‡ = Player joined the club after the regular European domestic season (after June 2020), and played during the 2019–20 season in games postponed due to the COVID-19 pandemic

=== Appearances and goals ===
No.	Name	WSL		FA Cup		League Cup		UWCL		Total	
No.	Name	Apps	Goals	Apps	Goals	Apps	Goals	Apps	Goals	Apps	Goals
Goalkeepers
1	(Austria) Manuela Zinsberger	12	0	4	0	4	0	2	0	22	0
18	(France) Pauline Peyraud-Magnin	3	0	0	0	4	0	3	0	10	0
18	(Australia) Lydia Williams ‡	0	0	0	0	0	0	0	0	0	0
24	(England) Fran Stenson	0	0	0	0	0	0	0	0	0	0
Defenders
2	(Denmark) Katrine Veje	0	0	0	0	2	0	1	0	3	0
3	(Scotland) Emma Mitchell	0+2	1	0	0	3	1	0+3	0	3+5	2
3	(England) Lotte Wubben-Moy ‡	0	0	0+1	0	0	0	0	0	0+1	0
5	(Scotland) Jen Beattie	9+1	0	1	0	3+1	2	5	0	18+2	2
6	(England) Leah Williamson	15	1	3+1	0	5+1	1	4	0	27+2	2
12	(Australia) Steph Catley ‡	0	0	0	0	0	0	0+1	0	0+1	0
16	(Republic of Ireland) Louise Quinn	3+3	0	2	0	6	0	1+2	0	12+5	1
16	(Switzerland) Noelle Maritz ‡	0	0	2	0	0	0	1	0	3	0
20	(Germany) Leonie Maier	6+7	0	2+1	0	6	0	2	0	16+8	0
21	(Germany) Tabea Kemme	0	0	0	0	0	0	0	0	0	0
22	(Austria) Viktoria Schnaderbeck	10	0	3	0	5+1	0	1+3	0	19+4	0
30	(England) Ruby Mace ‡	0	0	0+1	0	0	0	0	0	0+1	0
32	(England) Gracie Pearse	0	0	0	0	0	0	0	0	0	0
Midfielders
7	(Netherlands) Daniëlle van de Donk	14+1	5	3+1	1	6+1	3	5	3	28+3	12
8	(England) Jordan Nobbs	12+2	5	3	2	6+1	1	1+3	0	22+6	8
10	(Scotland) Kim Little (c)	12	5	3	0	3+1	3	5	4	23+1	12
13	(Switzerland) Lia Wälti	9+1	0	1+1	1	4+2	0	2+2	0	16+6	1
14	(Netherlands) Jill Roord	9+5	2	2	0	8	2	3+2	1	22+7	5
21	(Switzerland) Malin Gut ‡	0	0	0+1	0	0	0	0	0	0+1	0
26	(England) Ruby Grant	0	0	1	0	1+1	0	0	0	2+1	0
27	(England) Mel Filis	0+1	0	1	0	2	3	0	0	3+1	2
28	(Mexico) Silvana Flores	0	0	0	0	0	0	0	0	0	0
31	(England) Hannah Dawbarn	0	0	0	0	0	0	0	0	0	0
33	(Portugal) Ana Albuquerque	0	0	0	0	0	0	0	0	0	0
Forwards
9	(England) Danielle Carter	0	0	0	0	0	0	0	0	0	0
11	(Netherlands) Vivianne Miedema	14	16	3+1	0	5+2	3	5	10	27+3	29
15	(Republic of Ireland) Katie McCabe	12+1	0	3	1	5+2	3	4	0	24+3	4
17	(Scotland) Lisa Evans	14+1	2	2+1	3	4+3	2	5	1	25+5	8
19	(Australia) Caitlin Foord	0	0	3	1	1	0	0+1	0	4+1	1
23	(England) Beth Mead	11+3	3	2+1	0	5+2	5	5	1	23+6	9

‡ = Player joined the club after the regular European domestic season (after June 2020), and played during the 2019–20 season in games postponed due to the COVID-19 pandemic

=== Goalscorers ===
Rank	No.	Position	Name	WSL	FA Cup	League Cup	UWCL	Total
1	11	FW	(Netherlands) Vivianne Miedema	16	0	3	10	29
2	7	MF	(Netherlands) Daniëlle van de Donk	5	1	3	3	12
2	10	MF	(Scotland) Kim Little	5	0	3	4	12
4	23	FW	(England) Beth Mead	3	0	5	1	9
5	8	MF	(England) Jordan Nobbs	5	2	1	0	8
5	17	FW	(Scotland) Lisa Evans	2	3	2	1	8
7	14	MF	(Netherlands) Jill Roord	2	0	2	1	5
8	15	FW	(Republic of Ireland) Katie McCabe	0	1	3	0	4
9	27	MF	(England) Mel Filis	0	0	3	0	3
10	6	DF	(England) Leah Williamson	1	0	1	0	2
10	5	DF	(Scotland) Jen Beattie	0	0	2	0	2
10	3	DF	(Scotland) Emma Mitchell	1	0	1	0	2
13	19	FW	(Australia) Caitlin Foord	0	1	0	0	1
13	13	MF	(Switzerland) Lia Wälti	0	1	0	0	1
Total				40	9	29	20	98

=== Disciplinary record ===
Rank	No.	Position	Name	WSL		FA Cup		League Cup		UWCL		Total	
Rank	No.	Position	Name	Yellow card	Red card	Yellow card	Red card	Yellow card	Red card	Yellow card	Red card	Yellow card	Red card
1	15	DF	(Republic of Ireland) Katie McCabe	4	0	1	0	0	0	1	0	6	0
2	7	MF	(Netherlands) Daniëlle van de Donk	2	0	1	0	2	0	0	0	5	0
2	14	MF	(Netherlands) Jill Roord	4	0	0	0	1	0	0	0	5	0
4	23	FW	(England) Beth Mead	2	0	0	0	0	0	0	0	2	0
4	5	DF	(Scotland) Jen Beattie	1	0	0	0	0	0	1	0	2	0
6	1	GK	(Austria) Manuela Zinsberger	1	0	0	0	0	0	0	0	1	0
6	11	FW	(Netherlands) Vivianne Miedema	1	0	0	0	0	0	0	0	1	0
6	13	MF	(Switzerland) Lia Wälti	1	0	0	0	0	0	0	0	1	0
6	20	DF	(Germany) Leonie Maier	1	0	0	0	0	0	0	0	1	0
6	22	MF	(Austria) Viktoria Schnaderbeck	1	0	0	0	0	0	0	0	1	0
6	19	FW	(Australia) Caitlin Foord	0	0	0	0	0	0	1	0	1	0
6	6	DF	(England) Leah Williamson	0	0	0	0	0	0	1	0	1	0
6	16	DF	(Republic of Ireland) Louise Quinn	0	0	0	0	1	0	0	0	1	0
Total				18	0	2	0	4	0	4	0	28	0

=== Clean sheets ===
Rank	No.	Name	WSL	FA Cup	League Cup	UWCL	Total
1	18	(Austria) Manuela Zinsberger	6	3	2	1	12
2	1	(France) Pauline Peyraud-Magnin	2	0	4	2	8
Total			8	3	6	3	14

== Transfers, loans, and other signings ==
=== Transfers in ===
Announcement date	No.	Position	Player	From club
14 May 2019	14	MF	(Netherlands) Jill Roord	(Germany) Bayern Munich
17 May 2019	1	GK	(Austria) Manuela Zinsberger	(Germany) Bayern Munich
31 May 2019	20	DF	(Germany) Leonie Maier	(Germany) Bayern Munich
5 June 2019	5	DF	(Scotland) Jen Beattie	(England) Manchester City
16 August 2019	24	GK	(England) Fran Stenson	(England) Manchester City
24 January 2020	19	FW	(Australia) Caitlin Foord	(Australia) Sydney FC

=== Contract extensions ===
Announcement date	No.	Position	Player	At Arsenal since
14 May 2019	16	DF	(Republic of Ireland) Louise Quinn	2017
5 August 2019	10	MF	(Scotland) Kim Little (captain)	2016
28 November 2019	23	FW	(England) Beth Mead	2017
30 December 2019	13	MF	(Switzerland) Lia Wälti	2018

=== Transfers out ===
Announcement date	No.	Position	Player	To club
10 May 2019	1	GK	(Netherlands) Sari van Veenendaal	(Spain) Atlético Madrid
10 May 2019	20	MF	(Netherlands) Dominique Bloodworth	(Germany) Wolfsburg
23 May 2019	34	GK	(England) Libby Harper	(United States) Akron Zips
21 June 2019	32	FW	(Jamaica) Lachante Paul	(England) Leicester City
24 June 2019	28	FW	(Jamaica) Paige Bailey-Gale	(England) Leicester City
1 July 2019	24	MF	(England) Ava Kuyken	(United States) Florida Gators
1 July 2019		DF	(England) Abbie Roberts	(United States) Rutgers Scarlet Knights
3 August 2019	29	FW	(England) Amelia Hazard	(England) London Bees
22 August 2019	4	DF	(Denmark) Janni Arnth	(Italy) Fiorentina
14 January 2020	21	DF	(Germany) Tabea Kemme	Retired

=== Loans out ===
Announcement date	No.	Position	Player	To club
6 September 2019	24	GK	(England) Fran Stenson	(England) Blackburn Rovers
3 January 2020	3	DF	(Scotland) Emma Mitchell	(England) Tottenham Hotspur

== Injuries ==
Position	No.	Player	Injury	Last game	Estimated return
FW	9	(England) Danielle Carter	Knee (ACL)	vs. Bayern Munich, 28 July 2019	Entire season
MF	2	(Denmark) Katrine Veje	Foot	vs. Brighton & Hove Albion, 11 November 2019	Short-term
MF	10	(Scotland) Kim Little	Foot	vs. Chelsea, 19 January 2020	This season
MF	13	(Switzerland) Lia Wälti	Hamstring	vs. Manchester City, 29 January 2020	This season
FW	23	(England) Beth Mead	Knee (MCL)	vs. Liverpool, 13 February 2020	This season

== Club ==
=== Kit (2019-20) ===
Adidas were announced as Arsenal's kit supplier as of the start of the season. This marked the first time since the 1993–94 season that Adidas have been the kit supplier to the club.

Supplier: Adidas / Sponsor: Fly Emirates / Sleeve sponsor: Visit Rwanda

Home	Home alternate	Away	Goalkeeper 1	Goalkeeper 2

==== Kit usage (2019-20) ====
Kit	Combination	Usage	
Home	Red body; White sleeves; White shorts; White socks	WSL	West Ham United (H); Brighton & Hove Albion (H); Manchester City (H); Liverpool (H); Bristol City (H); Reading (A); Birmingham City (H); Chelsea (H)
Home	Red body; White sleeves; White shorts; White socks	FA Cup	Lewes (H)
Home	Red body; White sleeves; White shorts; White socks	League Cup	Charlton Athletic (H); Bristol City (H); London Bees (H); Reading (H); Manchester City (H)
Home	Red body; White sleeves; White shorts; White socks	UWCL	Fiorentina (A); Fiorentina (H); Slavia Praha (H)
Home alt. 1	Red body; White sleeves; White shorts; Red socks	WSL	Chelsea (A); Tottenham Hotspur (A)
Home alt. 1	Red body; White sleeves; White shorts; Red socks	League Cup	Brighton & Hove Albion (A); Chelsea (N)
Away	Yellow body; Yellow sleeves; Navy shorts; Yellow socks	WSL	Manchester United (A); Everton (A); Brighton & Hove Albion (A); Manchester City (A); Liverpool (A)
Away	Yellow body; Yellow sleeves; Navy shorts; Yellow socks	FA Cup	West Ham United (A)
Away	Yellow body; Yellow sleeves; Navy shorts; Yellow socks	League Cup	London City Lionesses (A)
Away	Yellow body; Yellow sleeves; Navy shorts; Yellow socks	UWCL	Slavia Praha (A)

==== Goalkeeper kit usage (2019-20) ====
Kit	Combination	Usage	
Goalkeeper 1	Blue body; Blue sleeves; Blue shorts; Blue socks	WSL	West Ham United (H); Manchester United (A); Brighton & Hove Albion (A); Liverpool (H); Bristol City (H); Reading (A); Everton (A); Birmingham City (H); Brighton & Hove Albion (A); Chelsea (H)
Goalkeeper 1	Blue body; Blue sleeves; Blue shorts; Blue socks	FA Cup	West Ham United (A); Lewes (H)
Goalkeeper 1	Blue body; Blue sleeves; Blue shorts; Blue socks	League Cup	London City Lionesses (A); Bristol City (H); London Bees (H); Reading (H); Manchester City (H); Chelsea (N)
Goalkeeper 1	Blue body; Blue sleeves; Blue shorts; Blue socks	UWCL	Fiorentina (A); Fiorentina (H); Slavia Praha (H)
Goalkeeper 2	Green body; Green sleeves; Green shorts; Green socks	WSL	Chelsea (A); Manchester City (H); Tottenham Hotspur (A); Manchester City (A); Liverpool (A)
Goalkeeper 2	Green body; Green sleeves; Green shorts; Green socks	League Cup	Charlton Athletic (H); Brighton & Hove Albion (A)
Goalkeeper 2	Green body; Green sleeves; Green shorts; Green socks	UWCL	Slavia Praha (A)

=== Kit (2020-21) ===
Supplier: Adidas / Sponsor: Fly Emirates / Sleeve sponsor: Visit Rwanda

Home	Home alt.	Away	Goalkeeper 1

==== Kit usage (2020-21) ====
Kit	Combination	Usage	
Home	Red body; White sleeves; White shorts; Red socks	FA Cup	Tottenham Hotspur (H)
Home alt. 1	Red body; White sleeves; Red shorts; Red socks	FA Cup	Manchester City (A)
Away	Marble shirt; Marble sleeves; Redcurrant shorts; White socks	UWCL	Paris Saint-Germain (N)

==== Goalkeeper kit usage (2020-21) ====
Kit	Combination	Usage	
Goalkeeper 1	Green body; Green sleeves; Green shorts; Green socks	FA Cup	Tottenham Hotspur (H); Manchester City (A)
Goalkeeper 1	Green body; Green sleeves; Green shorts; Green socks	UWCL	Paris Saint-Germain (N)

== Non-competitive ==
=== Pre-season ===
==== Friendly ====
28 July 2019 Emirates Cup	Arsenal (England)	0–1	(Germany) Bayern Munich	Holloway
12:30 BST		Report	Leupolz 24'	Stadium: Emirates Stadium; Attendance: 28,500; Referee: NA

7 August 2019 Friendly	VfL Wolfsburg (Germany)	3–0	(England) Arsenal	Kössen, Austria
15:30 CEST	Pajor 43'; Huth 45'; Jakabfi 71'	Arsenal Twitter Soccerway		Stadium: Akademie Liefering Platz 1 Attendance: NA; Referee: NA

14 August 2019 Friendly	Arsenal (England)	2–5	(Spain) Barcelona	Borehamwood
19:30 BST	McCabe 37'; Little 76' (pen.)	Report	Guijarro 44'; Oshoala 45', 50'; Pina 71', 81'	Stadium: Meadow Park; Attendance: NA; Referee: NA

25 August 2019 Friendly	Arsenal	6–0	Tottenham Hotspur	Borehamwood
14:00 BST	Roord 5', 64', 73'; Beattie 21'; Nobbs 50'; Miedema 59'	Report		Stadium: Meadow Park

== Competitions ==
=== Overall record ===
Competition	First match	Last match	Starting round	Final position	Record							
Competition	First match	Last match	Starting round	Final position	Pld	W	D	L	GF	GA	GD	Win %
FA WSL	8 September 2019	13 February 2020	Matchday 1	3rd	15	12	0	3	40	13	+27	80.00
Women's FA Cup	26 January 2020	1 October 2020	Fourth round	Semi-finals	4	3	0	1	9	2	+7	75.00
FA Women's League Cup	22 September 2019	29 February 2020	Group stage	Runners-up	8	6	1	1	29	3	+26	75.00
UEFA Women's Champions League	12 September 2019	22 August 2020	Round of 32	Quarter-finals	5	4	0	1	20	4	+16	80.00
Total					32	25	1	6	98	22	+76	78.13

Source: FA WSL

=== FA WSL ===
==== Partial league table ====
Pos	Team	Pld	W	D	L	GF	GA	GD	Pts	PPG	Qualification
1	Chelsea (C)	15	12	3	0	47	11	+36	39	2.60	Qualification for the Champions League knockout phase
2	Manchester City	16	13	1	2	39	9	+30	40	2.50	Qualification for the Champions League knockout phase
3	Arsenal	15	12	0	3	40	13	+27	36	2.40	
4	Manchester United	14	7	2	5	24	12	+12	23	1.64	
5	Reading	14	6	3	5	21	24	−3	21	1.50	

Source: FA WSL, BBC
Rules for classification: Initially: 1) Points; 2) Goal difference; 3) Number of goals scored. After abandonment of season: 1) Points per game
(C) Champions

==== Results summary ====
Overall								Home						Away					
Pld	W	D	L	GF	GA	GD	Pts	W	D	L	GF	GA	GD	W	D	L	GF	GA	GD
15	12	0	3	40	13	+27	36	6	0	1	22	6	+16	6	0	2	18	7	+11

Last updated: 14 May 2019.
Source: FA WSL

==== Results by matchday ====
Matchday	1	2	3	4	5	6	7	8	9	10	11	12	13	14	15	16	17	18	19	20	21	22
Ground	H	A	H	A	H	A	H	H	A	A	H	A	H	A	A	H	A	A	H	A	H	H
Result	W	W	W	L	W	W	W	W	W	W	W	W	L	L	W	P	P	P	P	P	P	P
Position	1	1	1	3	2	2	2	1	1	1	1	1	1	3	3	3	3	3	3	3	3	3

Updated to match(es) played on 11 May 2019. Source: FA WSL
W = Win; D = Draw; L = Loss; P = Postponed

==== Matches ====
8 September 2019 1	Arsenal	2–1	West Ham United	Borehamwood
14:30 BST	Schnaderbeck (yellow card) 1'; Mead 14'; Maier (yellow card) 25'; Roord 41', (yellow card) 90+3'	Report	Leon (yellow card) 44'; Thomas 58'	Stadium: Meadow Park; Attendance: 1,795; Referee: Stacey Pearson

16 September 2019 2	Manchester United	0–1	Arsenal	Leigh, Greater Manchester
19:30 BST	James (yellow card) 90+4'	Report	Roord (yellow card) 79'; Van de Donk 89', (yellow card) 90+4'; Zinsberger (yellow card) 90+1'	Stadium: Leigh Sports Village; Attendance: 2,530; Referee: Abigail Byrne

29 September 2019 3	Arsenal	4–0	Brighton & Hove Albion	Borehamwood
12:30 BST	Little 9'; Miedema 39'; Van de Donk 57'; Nobbs 70'	Report	Skovsen (yellow card) 76'; Nildén (yellow card) 88'	Stadium: Meadow Park; Attendance: 1,607; Referee: Elliot Swallow

13 October 2019 4	Chelsea	2–1	Arsenal	Kingston upon Thames, London
15:00 BST	Ji (yellow card) 38'; England 57'; Thorisdottir 85'	Report	Van de Donk 9'; Miedema (yellow card) 39'; Mead (yellow card) 45+2'	Stadium: Kingsmeadow; Attendance: 4,149; Referee: Rebecca Welch

27 October 2019 5	Arsenal	1–0	Manchester City	Borehamwood
14:30 GMT	Miedema 43'; McCabe (yellow card) 74'	Report	Bonner (yellow card) 80'	Stadium: Meadow Park; Attendance: 2,424; Referee: Rebecca Welch

17 November 2019 6	Tottenham Hotspur	0–2	Arsenal	Tottenham
14:00 GMT	Peplow (yellow card) 36'; Furness (yellow card) 58'; Neville (yellow card) 79'	Report	Little 66'; Miedema 82'	Stadium: Tottenham Hotspur Stadium; Attendance: 38,262; Referee: Abigail Byrne

24 November 2019 7	Arsenal	1–0	Liverpool	Borehamwood
14:00 GMT	Miedema 28'	Report		Stadium: Meadow Park; Attendance: 2,017; Referee: Elizabeth Simms

1 December 2019 8	Arsenal	11–1	Bristol City	Borehamwood
14:00 GMT	Evans 7', 60'; Williamson 10'; Miedema 15', 26', 32', 51', 56', 64'; Nobbs 54'; Mitchell 79'	Report	Daniëls (penalty missed) 85' 85'	Stadium: Meadow Park; Attendance: 1,513; Referee: Helen Conley
Note: New FA WSL record scoreline

8 December 2019 9	Reading	0–3	Arsenal	High Wycombe
14:00 GMT	Moore (yellow card) 31'; Pacheco (yellow card) 50'; Utland (yellow card) 57'	Report	Miedema 28', 90+1'; Little 37'	Stadium: Adams Park; Attendance: 943; Referee: Richard Hulme

15 December 2019 10	Everton	1–3	Arsenal	Southport
14:00 GMT	George (yellow card) 32'; Kelly 78'	Report	Miedema 14', 57'; Little 55' (pen.)	Stadium: Haig Avenue; Attendance: 451; Referee: Benjamin Speedie

5 January 2020 11	Arsenal	2–0	Birmingham City	Borehamwood
14:00 GMT	Little 9'; Nobbs 23'	Report		Stadium: Meadow Park; Attendance: 2,106; Referee: Elizabeth Simms

12 January 2020 12	Brighton & Hove Albion	0–4	Arsenal	Crawley
14:00 GMT		Report	Van de Donk 3'; Roord 31', (yellow card) 44'; Nobbs 51'; Mead 89'	Stadium: Broadfield Stadium; Attendance: 1,312; Referee: Kirsty Dowle

19 January 2020 13	Arsenal	1–4	Chelsea	Borehamwood
14:00 GMT	McCabe (yellow card) 36'; Mead 74'; Wälti (yellow card) 88'	Report	England 10'; Kerr 13'; Ingle 20'; Mjelde (yellow card) 65'; Reiten 68'	Stadium: Meadow Park; Attendance: 4,000; Referee: Abigail Bryne
Note: New Arsenal Women record attendance at Meadow Park.

2 February 2020 14	Manchester City	2–1	Arsenal	Manchester, Greater Manchester
14:00 GMT	Bremer 43'; Hemp 49'; Stanway (yellow card) 62'	Report	Van de Donk 58', (yellow card) 60'; Mead (yellow card) 77'; Roord (yellow card) 81'; McCabe (yellow card) 84'	Stadium: Academy Stadium; Attendance: 3,664; Referee: Stacey Pearson

13 February 2020 15	Liverpool	2–3	Arsenal	Chester, Cheshire
19:00 GMT	Bradley-Auckland (yellow card) 5'; Babajide 14' (yellow card) 86'; Furness 45+2'; Robe (yellow card) 52'	Report	Miedema 31', 78'; Nobbs 33'; Beattie (yellow card) 58'; McCabe (yellow card) 61'	Stadium: Deva Stadium; Attendance: 660; Referee: Rebecca Welch
Note: Moved from Prenton Park

23 February 2020 16	Arsenal	–	Reading	Borehamwood
				Stadium: Meadow Park
Note: Cancelled due to the COVID-19 pandemic

22 March 2020 17	Bristol City	–	Arsenal
Note: Cancelled due to the COVID-19 pandemic

29 March 2020 18	West Ham United	–	Arsenal
Note: Cancelled due to the COVID-19 pandemic

5 April 2020 19	Arsenal	–	Manchester United	Borehamwood
				Stadium: Meadow Park
Note: Cancelled due to the COVID-19 pandemic

26 April 2020 20	Birmingham City	–	Arsenal
Note: Cancelled due to the COVID-19 pandemic

13 May 2020 21	Arsenal	–	Tottenham Hotspur	Borehamwood
				Stadium: Meadow Park
Note: Cancelled due to the COVID-19 pandemic

16 May 2020 22	Arsenal	–	Everton	Borehamwood
				Stadium: Meadow Park
Note: Cancelled due to the COVID-19 pandemic

=== FA Cup ===
Arsenal entered the Women's FA Cup in the fourth round against West Ham United on 26 January 2020, Wälti's side-footed volley and McCabe's early goal meant the "Gunners" comfortably moved into the fifth round of the competition. Arsenal's win came after their 4–1 league defeat to Chelsea; after the match, both Montemurro and Wälti said that they were happy with the team's response after the defeat. Arsenal then played Lewes on 23 February, a match which was postponed a few days earlier due to poor weather conditions caused by Storm Dennis. The club progressed to the quarter-finals following a "dominant" 2–0 home win over the second-tier side with goals from Foord and Van de Donk, it was Foord's first appearance and goal for the club since joining in January.

The competition was then delayed as a result of the COVID-19 pandemic with the quarter-final against Tottenham Hotspur in March postponed; the Football Association later rescheduled the remainder of the competition in July, set to be played from September, three weeks into the following WSL season. During Arsenal's match against "Spurs", which was played behind closed doors at Meadow Park, the "Gunners" comfortably won 4–0 with an Evans hat-trick and a goal from Nobbs. Arsenal were then drawn against title holders Manchester City for their semi-final fixture. The "Gunners" were defeated 2–1 at the Academy Stadium, goals from City's Sam Mewis and former Arsenal player Steph Houghton meant that Arsenal left the competition early. Manchester City later won the FA Cup after defeating Everton 3–1 in the final.

Match details

26 January 2020 Fourth round	West Ham United	0–2	Arsenal	Romford
13:00 GMT	Flaherty (yellow card); Middag (yellow card)	West Ham United F.C. Arsenal F.C.	McCabe 16'; Wälti 73'	Stadium: Rush Green Stadium; Attendance: 959

23 February 2020 Fifth round	Arsenal	2–0	Lewes	Borehamwood
13:00 GMT	Foord 53'; Van de Donk 84'	Sofascore womensfacup.co.uk		Stadium: Meadow Park; Attendance: 1,663; Referee: NA
Note: The match was originally scheduled for 16 February 2020, it was postponed to 23 February due to adverse weather conditions

26 September 2020 Quarter-finals	Arsenal	4–0	Tottenham Hotspur	Borehamwood
17:15 BST	Nobbs 72'; Evans 73', 84', 90'; Van de Donk (yellow card) 76'	Arsenal F.C. Tottenham Hotspur F.C.	Shelina Zadorsky (yellow card) 27'; Kennedy (yellow card) 71'	Stadium: Meadow Park; Attendance: 0 (Behind closed doors); Referee: Lucy Oliver
Note: The match was originally scheduled for March 2020, it was postponed to 26 September due to the COVID-19 pandemic

1 October 2020 Semi-finals	Manchester City	2–1	Arsenal	Manchester
19:15 BST	Houghton 19'; Bonner (yellow card) 29'; Mewis 41'	Arsenal F.C. Football Association	Jordan Nobbs 38'; McCabe (yellow card) 45'	Stadium: Academy Stadium; Attendance: 0 (Behind closed doors); Referee: Helen Conley

=== FA Women's League Cup ===
==== Group stage ====
Arsenal began their FA Women's League Cup campaign away against second-tier side London City Lionesses in September 2019. The "Gunners" dispatched the newly-formed side 5–0, Mead scored a hat-trick whilst Roord and Mitchell bagged the other goals which gave Arsenal a winning start to the group stage. After the match Mead explained that Arsenal's league campaign was most important to the team, but also said that "we are a team that wants to win things and we should be winning things", hinting at Arsenal's desire to win the competition. In late October, Arsenal later defeated Charlton Athletic 4–0 at Meadow Park with goals from Mead, Beattie and two from Van de Donk. After a penalty defeat against Brighton & Hove Albion, and wins against Bristol City and the London Bees, Arsenal qualified for the knockout phase with 13 points on their group stage table.

Pos	Team	Pld	W	WPEN	LPEN	L	GF	GA	GD	Pts	Qualification	ARS	BHA	BRI	LON	CHA	LCL
1	Arsenal	5	4	0	1	0	25	0	+25	13	Advance to Knock-out stage	—	—	7–0	9–0	4–0	—
2	Brighton & Hove Albion	5	3	1	0	1	13	4	+9	11	Advance to Knock-out stage	0–0	—	1–2	—	—	—
3	Bristol City	5	3	0	1	1	11	11	0	10		—	—	—	3–0	—	1–1
4	London Bees	5	1	1	0	3	3	17	−14	5		—	0–5	—	—	0–0	—
5	Charlton Athletic	5	1	0	1	3	3	12	−9	4		—	0–3	2–5	—	—	1–0
6	London City Lionesses	5	0	1	0	4	3	14	−11	2		0–5	2–4	—	0–3	—	—

Source: playmakerstats.com
Rules for classification: 1) Points; 2) Goal difference; 3) Number of goals scored; 4) Number of wins; 5) Head-to-head record

22 September 2019 1	London City Lionesses	0–5	Arsenal	Dartford
14:00 BST		Football Association; Arsenal F.C.	Mead 28', 57', 79'; Roord 33'; Mitchell 54'	Stadium: Princes Park; Attendance: 577; Referee: Jacob Miles

20 October 2019 2	Arsenal	4–0	Charlton Athletic	Borehamwood
14:00 BST	Beattie 34'; Van de Donk 45', 50'; Mead 48'	Football Association; Arsenal F.C.		Stadium: Meadow Park; Attendance: 1,171; Referee: Andrew Humphries

3 November 2019 3	Brighton & Hove Albion	0–0 (4–2 p)	Arsenal	Crawley
14:00 GMT	Barton (yellow card) 52'	Football Association; BHA F.C.		Stadium: Broadfield Stadium; Attendance: 761; Referee: Paul Howard
	Penalties
	Barton (penalty missed); Green (penalty scored); Le Tissier (penalty scored); Buet (penalty scored); Le Garrec (penalty scored)		(penalty missed) Little; (penalty scored) McCabe; (penalty missed) Mead; (penalty scored) Van de Donk

21 November 2019 4	Arsenal	7–0	Bristol City	Borehamwood
15:00 GMT	Little 33', 52' (pen.); Roord 45'; Miedema 57', 76'; Nobbs 87'; Beattie 90'	Football Association; Arsenal F.C.		Stadium: Meadow Park; Attendance: 805; Referee: Louise Saunders

11 December 2019 5	Arsenal	9–0	London Bees	Borehamwood
19:30 GMT	McCabe 8', 34', 54'; Filis 45', 77', 86'; Evans 48', 88'; Mead 49'	Football Association; Arsenal F.C.		Stadium: Meadow Park; Attendance: NA; Referee: Lisa Benn

==== Knockout phase ====
Arsenal hosted WSL side Reading on 15 January for their quarter-final tie, the "Gunners" defeated Reading with a late strike from Little which was teed up by Evans down the right wing. After the match, Montemurro acknowledged Arsenal's struggle to stick to their principles saying that "there were lots of elements of frustration." Later in the month, Arsenal played Manchester City at Meadow Park. They qualified for the competition's final after a 2–1 win with goals from Miedema and Van de Donk; City almost got back into the game with pressure on the Arsenal defence, but goalkeeper Zinsberger made several high quality saves to keep Arsenal in the match. The City Ground played host for the final against Chelsea, who had defeated Manchester United 1–0 in the semi-finals. Arsenal lost the League Cup final 2–1 with Bethany England scoring both goals for Chelsea; the first was a strike in bottom corner from close range, Williamson then equalised for Arsenal in the second half through a corner, but Chelsea responded late in the game when Sam Kerr set up England to finish in an open net.

===== Match details =====
15 January 2020 Quarter-finals	Arsenal	1–0	Reading	Borehamwood
19:30 GMT	Roord (yellow card) 35'; Van de Donk (yellow card) 37'; Little 86'	Football Association; Arsenal F.C.	Moore (yellow card) 62'; James (yellow card) 63'; Rowe (yellow card) 73'	Stadium: Meadow Park; Referee: Emily Heaslip

29 January 2020 Semi-finals	Arsenal	2–1	Manchester City	Borehamwood
19:30 GMT	Miedema 6'; Van de Donk 44', (yellow card) 89'	Football Association; Arsenal F.C.	Stanway (yellow card) 14'; White (penalty missed) 59'; Bonner 60' (yellow card) 82'	Stadium: Meadow Park; Referee: Abigail Byrne

29 February 2020 Final	Arsenal	1–2	Chelsea	West Bridgford
17:30 GMT	Quinn (yellow card) 81'; Williamson 85'	Football Association; Arsenal F.C.	England 9', 90+2'; Eriksson (yellow card) 57'; Cuthbert (yellow card) 77'	Stadium: City Ground; Attendance: 6,743; Referee: Helen Conley

=== UEFA Women's Champions League ===
==== Knockout phase ====
===== Round of 32 =====
Arsenal returned to the UEFA Women's Champions League for the first time since March 2014, the club qualified for the round of 32 on virtue of finishing first in the WSL in the previous season; Arsenal travelled to Florence, Italy to face Fiorentina on 12 September 2019 in what was their first European match in over five years. The "Gunners" won 4–0 with a brace (two goals) from Miedema, a far corner finish by Little, and an Evans volley setup by Mead to all but send Arsenal into the next round. They later confirmed qualification when they defeated the Italian side 2–0 in the second leg at home.

12 September 2019 First leg	Fiorentina (Italy)	0–4	(England) Arsenal	Florence, Italy
18:00 BST	Philtjens (yellow card) 34'	Report	Miedema 18', 51'; Little 32'; Evans 55'	Stadium: Stadio Artemio Franchi; Attendance: 5,338; Referee: Ivana Martinčić (Croatia)

26 September 2019 Second leg	Arsenal (England)	2–0 (6–0 agg.)	(Italy) Fiorentina	Borehamwood
19:30 BST	Little 43' (pen.); Miedema 74'	Report	De Vanna (yellow card) 30'; Lázaro (yellow card) 66'	Stadium: Meadow Park; Attendance: NA; Referee: Iuliana Demetrescu (Romania)

===== Round of 16 =====
Arsenal comfortably qualified for the quarter-finals after they defeated Czech side Slavia Praha 13–2 on aggregate; Tumaini Carayol from The Guardian characterised Arsenal's 8–0 second leg win as a "rout". Miedema scored seven goals over the two matches.

16 October 2019 First leg	Slavia Prague (Czech Republic)	2–5	(England) Arsenal	Prague, Czech Republic
17:30 BST	Szewieczková (yellow card) 54'; Svitková 71'; Persson (yellow card) 57', (goal) 88'	Report	Miedema 24', 26', 39', 52'; McCabe (yellow card) 38'; Little 58' (pen.)	Stadium: Sinobo Stadium; Attendance: NA; Referee: Eleni Antoniou (Greece)

31 October 2019 Second leg	Arsenal (England)	8–0 (13–2 agg.)	(Czech Republic) Slavia Praha	Borehamwood
19:30 GMT	Van de Donk 21', 59', 70'; Little 24' (pen.); Roord 32'; Miedema 45', 74', 86'	Report	Szewieczková (yellow card) 67'; Veselá (yellow card) 68'	Stadium: Meadow Park; Attendance: NA; Referee: Riem Hussein (Germany)

===== Quarter-finals =====
Arsenal were drawn against French side Paris Saint-Germain (PSG) for their quarter-final tie, the legs were originally scheduled to be played in March and April 2020. In March, the competition was put on hold indefinitely due to the COVID-19 pandemic, along with all other UEFA competitions and matches including UEFA Euro 2020. In July, UEFA announced that the quarter-final ties were to be played over a single leg at a neutral venue behind closed doors in August; Arsenal were set to play PSG at Anoeta Stadium in San Sebastián, Spain, the home stadium of La Liga side Real Sociedad. Clubs were allowed to register six new eligible players for the tie due to the extended tournament delay; Summer signing Noelle Maritz started the match, whilst Australian international Steph Catley made an appearance from the substitutes bench. Arsenal lost 2–1 and were knocked out from the competition, Marie-Antoinette Katoto gave PSG an early lead before Mead equalised just before the end of the first half; despite Arsenal creating good chances in the second half, PSG substitute Signe Bruun scored the winner after stealing possession deep in Arsenal's half.

22 August 2020 Quarter-finals	Arsenal (England)	1–2	(France) Paris Saint-Germain	San Sebastián, Spain
19:00 BST	Mead 39'; Foord (yellow card) 80'; Williamson (yellow card) 88'	Report	Katoto 15'; Diani (yellow card) 32'; Lawrence (yellow card) 40'; Bruun 77'	Stadium: Anoeta Stadium; Attendance: 0 (Behind closed doors); Referee: Esther Staubli (Switzerland)
Note: The match was originally scheduled for March 2020, it was postponed to 22 August due to the COVID-19 pandemic

== See also ==
- List of Arsenal W.F.C. seasons
- 2019–20 in English football
