= Ebony Salmon =

English footballer (born 2001)

- Salmon in 2026

Personal information
- Date of birth: 27 January 2001 (age 25)
- Place of birth: Wolverhampton, England
- Height: 5 ft 4 in (1.63 m)
- Position: Forward

Team information
- Current team: West Ham United
- Number: 17

Youth career
- 2014–2017: Aston Villa

Senior career*
Years	Team	Apps	(Gls)
2017–2018	Aston Villa	12	(7)
2018–2019	Manchester United	0	(0)
2019	→ Sheffield United (loan)	9	(7)
2019–2021	Bristol City	34	(11)
2021–2022	Racing Louisville	25	(6)
2022–2023	Houston Dash	30	(10)
2023–2026	Aston Villa	58	(9)
2026–	West Ham United	2	(0)

International career^{‡}
2017–2018	England U17	14	(9)
2019–2020	England U19	12	(8)
2021–	England	4	(0)
2022–	England U23	5	(0)
- * Club domestic league appearances and goals as of 15:50, 15 September 2026 (UTC) ‡ National team caps and goals as of 31 December 2023

Ebony Salmon (born 27 January 2001) is an English professional footballer who plays as a forward for Women's Super League club West Ham United. Salmon has captained England's under-17s and under-23s, and made her senior international debut for the England national team in February 2021.

== Club career ==
=== Aston Villa ===
After three years in the Aston Villa academy, Salmon joined the first team in the WSL 2 for the 2017–18 season.

On 8 October 2017, Salmon made her debut in a 2–1 defeat at Sheffield. A month later, she scored her first goal for the club in a 4–0 victory against Watford. On 5 November, Salmon scored in a 2–2 WSL Cup draw against Sheffield, before being dismissed in the final minute of the match.

She scored her first brace for the club in a 3–3 draw against the London Bees on 7 January 2018, and went on to score in three consecutive games in April. Salmon scored a total of seven goals in 12 league games, despite her team finishing second from bottom in the table and winning just three of their 18 games.

=== Manchester United ===
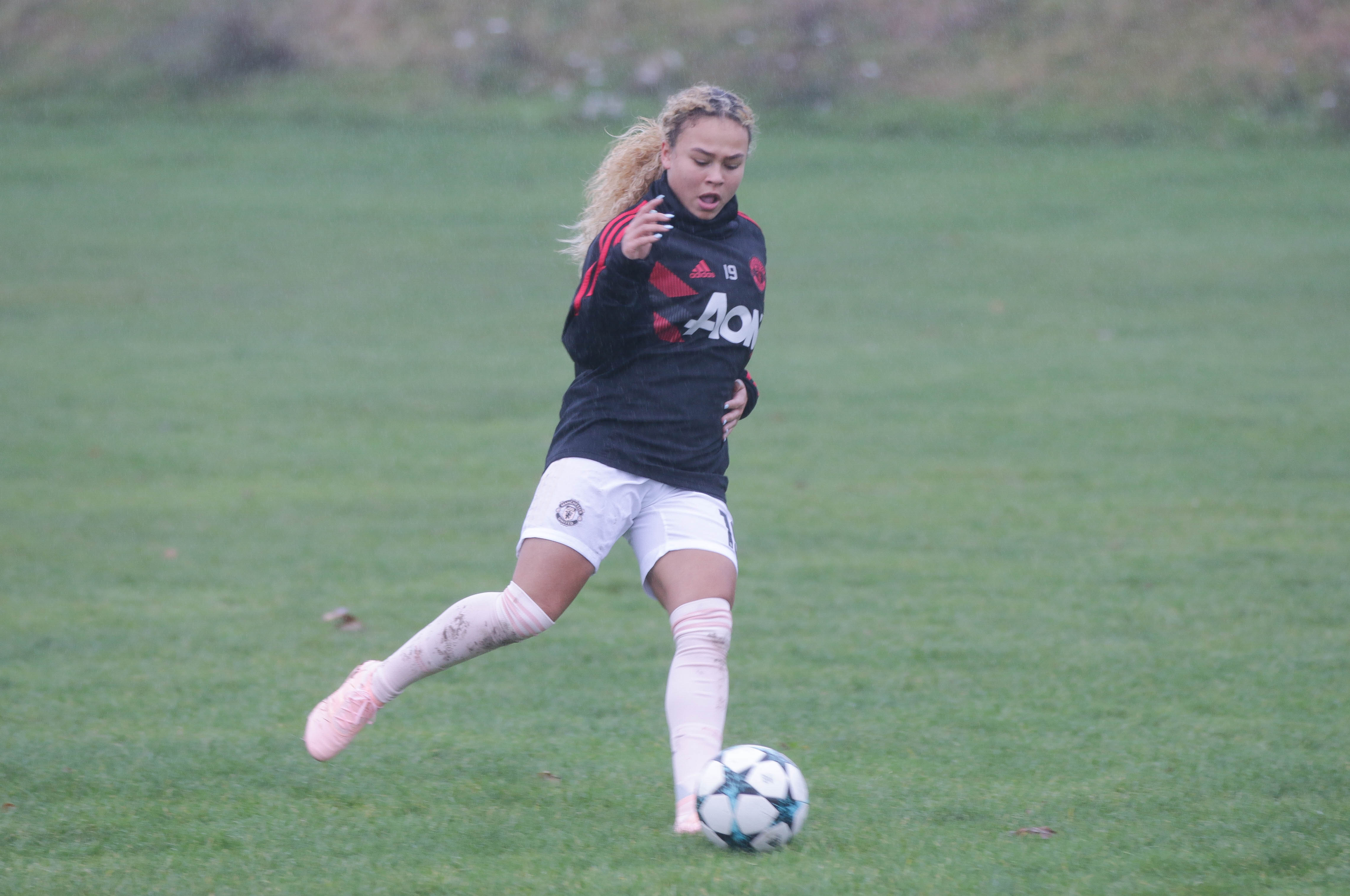
Salmon training with Manchester United in 2018

On 1 July 2018, Salmon joined the newly-formed Manchester United to compete in the FA Women's Championship. On 4 January 2019, Salmon moved to fellow Championship side Sheffield United on loan until the end of the season having not yet made her United debut. She was released at the end of the season having not made an appearance for the club.

==== Sheffield United (loan) ====
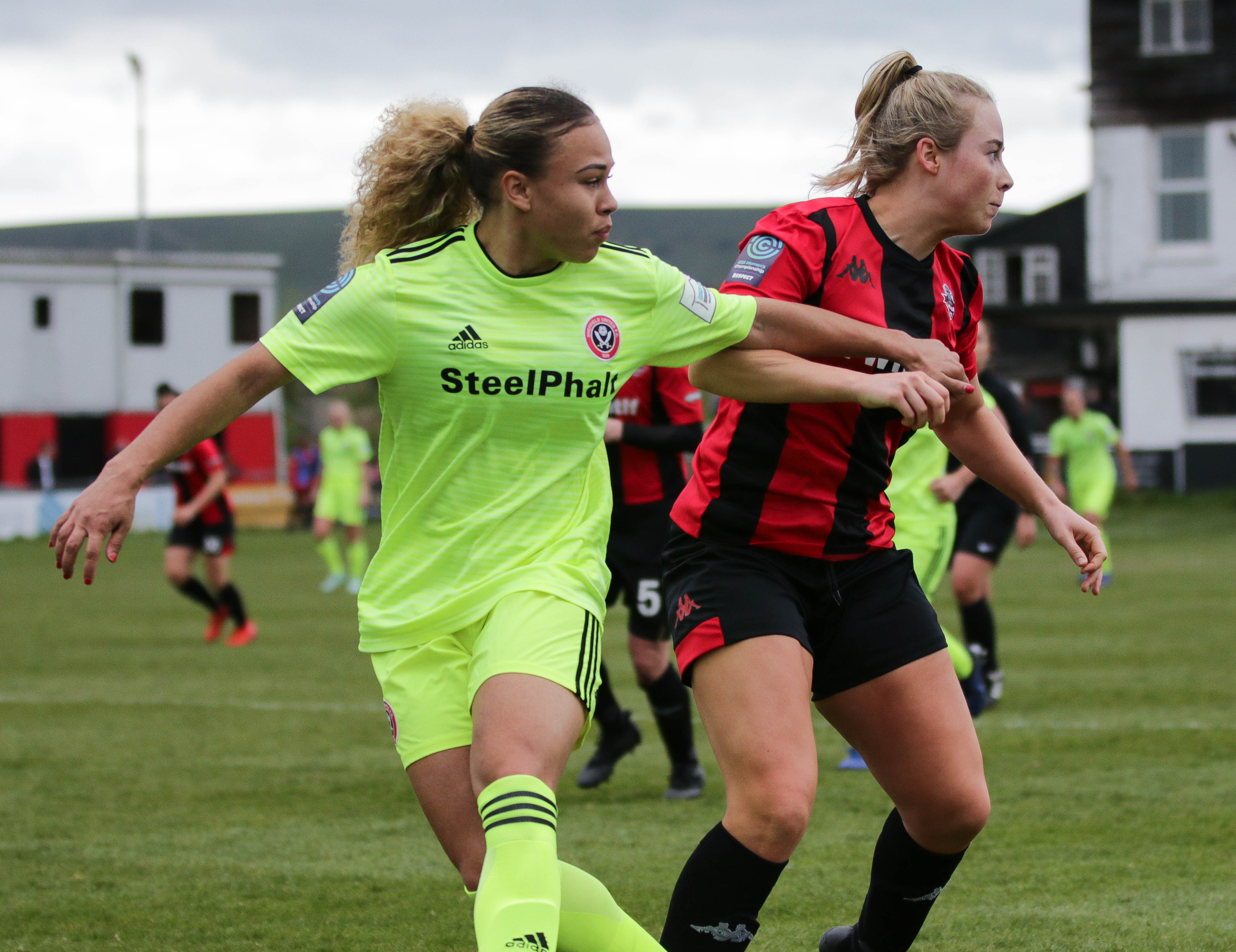
Salmon with Sheffield United in 2019

On 6 January 2019, she made her league debut for Sheffield United, as a 52nd-minute substitute for Chloe Dixon, in their 2–1 defeat by Tottenham Hotspur. On 27 January, Salmon scored her first goal for the club, converting a 90th minute penalty in Sheffield United's 2–3 defeat by Charlton Athletic in the Women's Championship. She scored her second brace of the season on 11 May in a 6–0 win over Millwall.

=== Bristol City ===
On 15 July 2019, Salmon signed with Bristol City ahead of the 2019–20 FA WSL season. She made her debut on the opening day of the season on 7 September 2019, in a 0–0 home draw against Brighton & Hove Albion. Salmon scored the only goal in a 1–0 away win against former club Manchester United to secure Bristol City's first win of the season on 5 January 2020. Salmon was Bristol City's highest goalscorer for the 2019–20 season, scoring five league goals and eight in all competitions as Bristol City avoided relegation after finishing the curtailed season in 10th place on points-per-game. She repeated the feat the following season, scoring 10 goals in all competitions including six in the league. However, Bristol City finished bottom and were relegated. On 13 May 2021, the club announced Salmon would be leaving in the summer upon the expiration of her contract.

=== Racing Louisville ===
Following her departure from Bristol City, it was announced on the same day that Salmon had signed a two-year contract with NWSL expansion franchise Racing Louisville. She made her debut as a 71st-minute substitute on 20 June and scored the only goal 74 seconds after coming on (34 seconds after the game restarted) in a 1–0 win over Houston Dash. In her debut season Salmon finished as the team's highest league goalscorer with six goals in 20 appearances, and second on the team for goals in all competitions behind Cece Kizer on seven.

=== Houston Dash ===
Under new coach Kim Björkegren in 2022, Salmon's playing time at Racing Louisville declined. Louisville's general manager James O'Connor broached the prospect of a trade to Salmon, who had considered requesting one. The team subsequently traded her on 27 June 2022 to Houston Dash in exchange for up to $190,000 of allocation money depending on her results in Houston, a fee that set a Louisville club record. Upon arriving, the Dash signed Salmon to a one-year contract extension through 2023, and Salmon remarked in an interview that she would be "taking my anger from not playing in Louisville and I'm going to show what I can do here when I get on the pitch."

=== Return to Aston Villa ===
On 8 September 2023, it was announced that Salmon had returned to Aston Villa on a three-year deal. In the 2023–24 season, Salmon scored in the 2-1 away victory against Everton.

=== West Ham United ===
On 10 July 2026, Salmon signed a two-year deal with West Ham United.

== International career ==
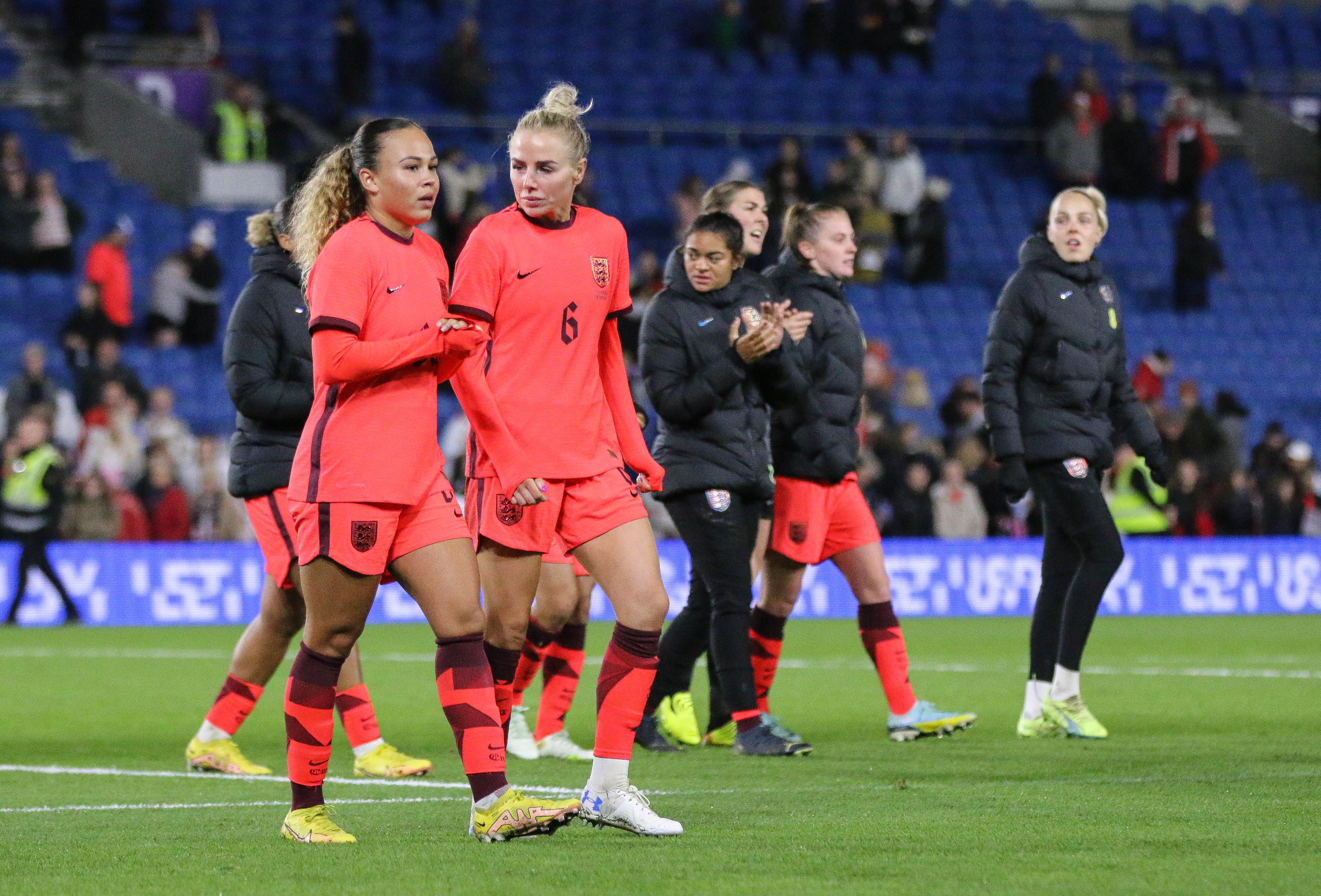
Salmon (left) with Alex Greenwood, playing for England against Czech Republic, 11 October 2022.

=== Youth ===
On 28 April 2017, Salmon made her debut for England Under-17s in a 2–0 defeat to the United States. In her third team appearance, she scored both of her country's goals in a 6–2 defeat in the United States after coming on as a half-time substitute. In 2018 U17 Championship qualification, Salmon scored in a 10–0 victory against Latvia, and added two goals in a 6–0 win against Slovakia in October 2017 to help qualify. In May 2018, Salmon captained England at the U17 Championship. After scoring in a 2–1 defeat to Spain, Salmon scored a hat-trick in 18 minutes against Italy to secure a place in the knockout rounds. She appeared in the semi-final and third-place fixtures as England finished the tournament in fourth.

On 3 April 2019, in the under-19 squad for 2019 U19 Championship qualification, Salmon scored two goals in the 7–0 victory against Turkey, with another goal in the 2019 U19 Championship against Belgium. In October 2019 for 2020 U19 Championship qualification, she scored in each group match, with one goal against Cyprus and Serbia, and two against Belarus, in matches that England all won. The 2020 U19 Championship was subsequently cancelled due the COVID-19 pandemic in Europe.

On 12 October 2021, after her senior team debut earlier in the year, Salmon captained the Under-23 team to a 1–0 victory against Belgium, and appeared as a substitute in the 11–0 win against Estonia on 30 November. In February 2022, she scored two goals against France in each game of the double-header fixture. On 8 April, she again captained the U23 team, this time against Netherlands for a 0–0 draw. From October until December 2023, Salmon featured in the new U23 European League, against Italy, Portugal, France, and Spain.

=== Senior ===
In February 2021, Salmon received her first senior international call-up as a late addition to Hege Riise's first squad as interim England manager. She made her debut on 23 February as an 84th-minute substitute for Rachel Daly in a 6–0 friendly win against Northern Ireland. In August 2022, she was selected for 2023 World Cup qualification matches.

Salmon was allotted 219 when the FA announced their legacy numbers scheme to honour the 50th anniversary of England's inaugural international.

== Personal life ==
Born in England, Salmon is of Jamaican descent through her father.

== Career statistics ==
=== Club ===
As of match played 12 September 2025

Appearances and goals by club, season and competition
Club	Season	League			National cup (Note: Includes Women's FA Cup)		League cup (Note: Includes FA Women's League Cup and NWSL Challenge Cup)		Total	
Club	Season	Division	Apps	Goals	Apps	Goals	Apps	Goals	Apps	Goals
Aston Villa	2017–18	Women's Super League 2	12	7	0	0	4	2	16	9
Manchester United	2018–19	Championship	0	0	0	0	0	0	0	0
Sheffield United (loan)	2018–19	Championship	9	7	2	1	0	0	11	8
Bristol City	2019–20	Women's Super League	14	5	2	0	5	3	21	8
Bristol City	2020–21	Women's Super League	20	6	1	0	6	4	27	10
Bristol City	Total		34	11	3	0	11	7	48	18
Racing Louisville	2021	NWSL	20	6	—		—		20	6
Racing Louisville	2022	NWSL	5	0	—		4	0	9	0
Racing Louisville	Total		25	6	0	0	4	0	29	6
Houston Dash	2022	NWSL	13	9	—		—		13	9
Houston Dash	2023	NWSL	17	1	—		6	1	23	2
Houston Dash	Total		30	10	0	0	6	1	36	11
Aston Villa	2023–24	Women's Super League	18	3	1	0	5	3	24	6
Aston Villa	2024–25	Women's Super League	19	4	3	0	3	2	25	6
Aston Villa	2025–26	Women's Super League	21	2	1	0	3	1	25	3
Aston Villa	Total		58	9	5	0	11	6	74	15
West Ham United	2026–27	Women's Super League	2	0	0	0	0	0	2	0
Career total			170	50	9	1	36	16	215	67

=== International ===
As of match played 19 February 2023

Appearances and goals by national team and year
National team	Year	Apps	Goals
England	2021	1	0
England	2022	2	0
England	2023	1	0
Total		4	0

== Honours ==
England

- Arnold Clark Cup: 2023

Individual

- Bristol City W.F.C. Player Of The Year Award - 2020/21
- Bristol City W.F.C. Young Player Of The Year Award - 2020/21
