= Vita van der Linden =

Dutch association football player (born 1997)

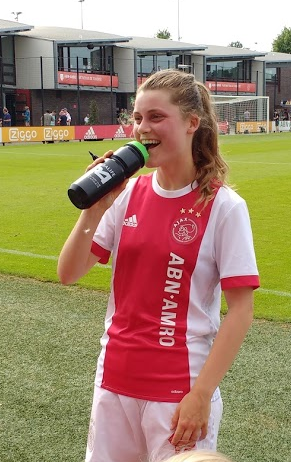

Personal information
- Full name: Vita van der Linden
- Date of birth: 4 January 1997 (age 29)
- Place of birth: Nijmegen, Netherlands
- Position: Midfielder

Team information
- Current team: OH Leuven
- Number: 14

Youth career
- SV Orion
- 2013–2015: CTO

Senior career*
Years	Team	Apps	(Gls)
2013–2014	PSV/FC Eindhoven	1	(0)
2015–2019	Ajax	29	(0)
2019	Bristol City	1	(0)
2020–2021	Reims	20	(0)
2021–2023	Ajax	14	(0)
2024–	OH Leuven		

International career
2013	Netherlands U16	6	(0)
2013	Netherlands U17	7	(1)
2014–2016	Netherlands U19	17	(3)
2019	Netherlands U23	7	(1)
- * Club domestic league appearances and goals as of 17:05, 12 June 2024

Vita van der Linden (born 4 January 1997) is a Dutch footballer who plays for OH Leuven.

== Club career ==
Van der Linden made her league debut against Club Brugge on 21 February 2014.

Van der Linden made her league debut against Heerenveen on 21 August 2015.

In July 2019 van der Linden transferred to Bristol City from Ajax. She made her league debut against Bristol City on 7 September 2019. Van der Linden scored her first goal against Charlton Athletic in the FA Women's League Cup on 11 December 2019, scoring in the 80th minute.

Van der Linden made her league debut against Montpellier HSC on 8 February 2020.

On 12 August 2021, it was announce that van der Linden had signed a one-year deal with the club. She made her league debut against Excelsior Rotterdam on 27 August 2021. In January 2022, van der Linden suffered a knee injury which kept her out until the end of the season.

On 1 February 2024, van der Linden signed with OH Leuven until the end of the season.

Whilst playing for Ajax, she suffered a serious knee injury.

== Honours ==
Individual

- UEFA Women's Under-19 Championship team of the tournament: 2016
