= Frankie Brown =

Scottish footballer (born 1987)

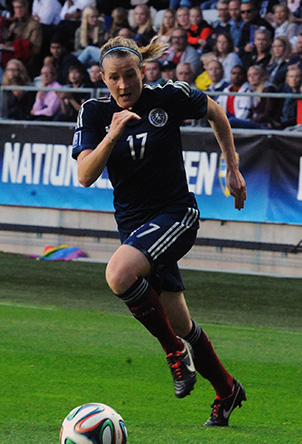

Personal information
- Date of birth: 8 October 1987 (age 39)
- Place of birth: Scotland, United Kingdom
- Position: Defender

Team information
- Current team: Bristol City
- Number: 5

Youth career
- Falkirk Girls

Senior career*
Years	Team	Apps	(Gls)
- Falkirk Ladies
- Whitehill Welfare
2005–2014	Hibernian	49+	(4+)
2011	→ Apollon Ladies (loan)		
2014–2020	Bristol City	68	(0)

International career^{‡}
2008–2019	Scotland	96	(0)
- * Club domestic league appearances and goals as of 18 January 2020 ‡ National team caps and goals as of 08:38, 17 April 2023 (UTC)

Frankie Brown (born 8 October 1987) is a Scottish former footballer who played for Falkirk Ladies, Whitehill Welfare, Hibernian, Bristol City and the Scotland national team.

== Playing career ==
A right-sided defender, Brown began her footballing career with Falkirk Girls and was called up to the national under-17 squad in 2004. After leaving school to study at the University of Edinburgh, Brown joined Whitehill Welfare before moving to Hibernian. She also played in the UEFA Women's Champions League for Cypriot side Apollon Limassol alongside fellow Scot Hayley Lauder.

Brown was called up to the full Scotland squad for the first time in August 2008 and won her first cap the following month in a friendly match against Switzerland.

She attended the Scottish Football Association National Performance Centre at the University of Stirling as a PhD student. After graduating, Brown took up a research post at the University of Bath, and in April 2014 she left Hibs to join FA WSL side Bristol City.

In July 2014 Brown was involved in an altercation between her Bristol teammate Natalia Pablos and Birmingham City's Karen Carney. On the strength of Brown's witness statement, Carney was fined, banned and sent on an education course for telling Pablos to "fuck off back to Spain." Pablos branded Carney a "puta madre" (English: mother fucker) during a lively exchange which Brown had drawn to the attention of the match referee.

== Career statistics ==
=== International appearances ===
As of the match played on 11 April 2023

Appearances and goals by national team and year
National team	Year	Apps	Goals
Scotland	2008	2	0
Scotland	2009	9	0
Scotland	2010	5	0
Scotland	2011	9	0
Scotland	2012	10	0
Scotland	2013	17	0
Scotland	2014	14	0
Scotland	2015	10	0
Scotland	2016	2	0
Scotland	2017	13	0
Scotland	2018	2	0
Scotland	2019	3	0
Total		96	0
