= Flo Allen (footballer) =

English footballer (born 1999)

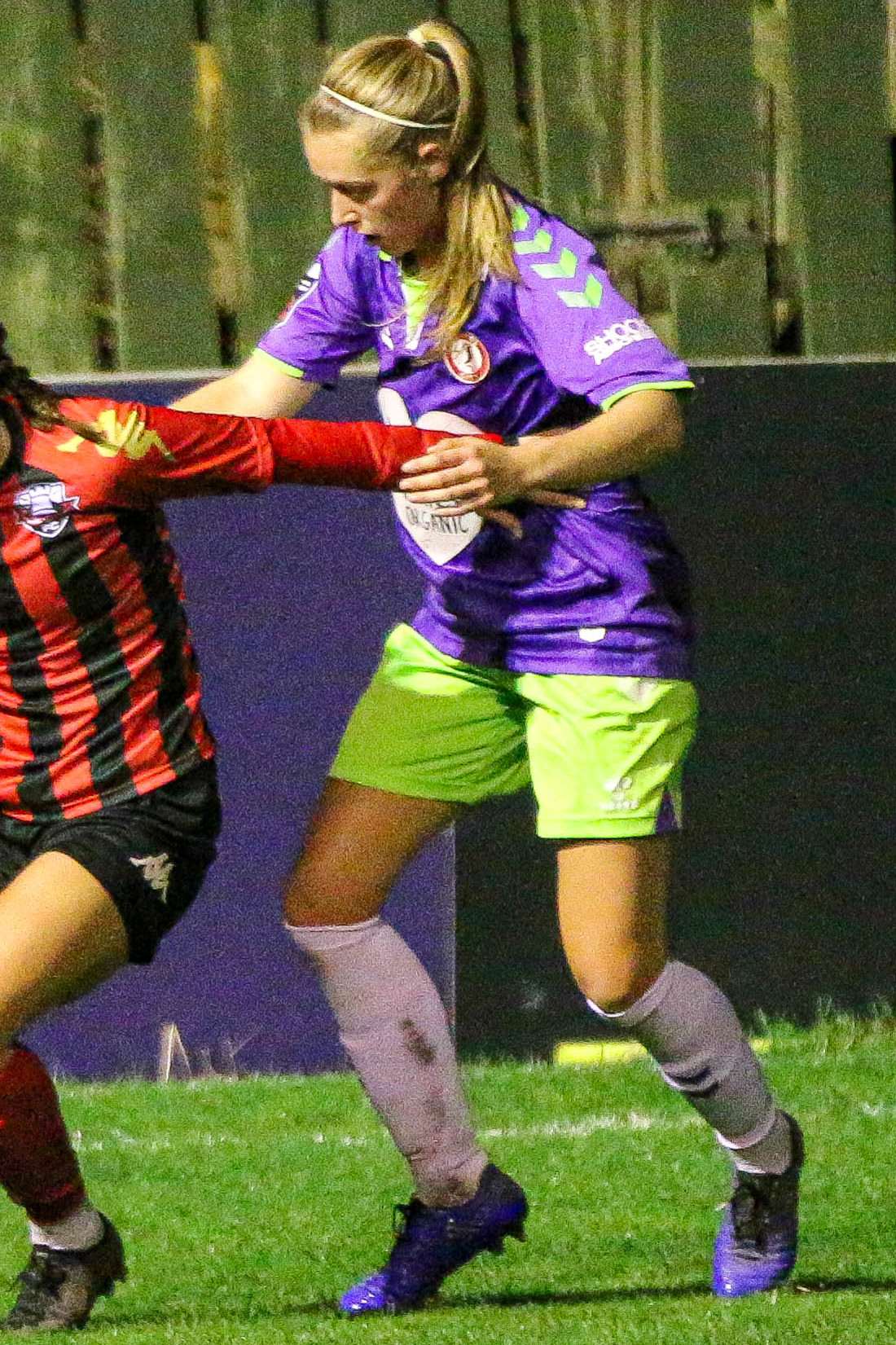

Personal information
- Full name: Florence Allen
- Date of birth: 13 August 1999 (age 27)
- Place of birth: Norwich, England
- Height: 1.63 m (5 ft 4 in)
- Positions: Defender; midfielder

Team information
- Current team: Norwich City Women (general manager)

Senior career*
Years	Team	Apps	(Gls)
2016–2022	Bristol City	87	(0)

International career^{‡}
2014	England U15		
2014–2016	England U17	5	(0)
2018–2019	England U19	6	(1)
- * Club domestic league appearances and goals as of 24 November 2016 ‡ National team caps and goals as of 21 April 2019

Florence Allen (born 13 August 1999) is an English former footballer who played as a defender for Bristol City. She has represented the England under-17 and under-19 national teams. She is currently the General Manager of Norwich City Women.

== Early life ==
Allen was raised on her family's farm in Norfolk and began playing football at the age of 6. At the age of 16, she moved to Bristol to pursue her dream of becoming a professional footballer.

== Playing career ==
=== Bristol City, 2016–2022 ===
Allen signed with Bristol City in January 2016 ahead of the 2016 FA WSL season. She made 11 appearances for the team and helped secure a second-place result with a 10–3–3 record and promotion to FA WSL 1. Allen was sidelined during the 2018–19 season due to a long term hip injury. Allen announced her retirement from professional football in April 2022.

=== International Appearances ===
Allen has represented England at under-15, under-17 and under-19 level. She was named in the England squad for the 2016 FIFA U-17 Women's World Cup which was held in Jordan.

== Norwich City Women ==
In June 2022, Allen was unveiled as the general manager of Norwich City Women. In December 2023, it was announced that Allen was to be BBC Radio Norfolk's first ever female summariser for their commentary of a Norwich City men's team match.

== Honours ==
Bristol City

- FA WSL 2 Runner-up: 2015
