= Loren Dykes =

Welsh footballer (born 1988)

Loren Dykes MBE
Personal information
- Date of birth: 5 February 1988 (age 38)
- Place of birth: Morriston, Wales
- Position: Right back

Team information
- Current team: Cardiff City

Youth career
- Llanelli Reds

Senior career*
Years	Team	Apps	(Gls)
- Cardiff City
2008–2020	Bristol City	101	(2)
2020–2021	Cardiff City	0	(0)

International career^{‡}
2007–2021	Wales	105	(3)

Managerial career
- 2020–2021: Bristol City (first team coach)
- 2021–2022: Wales (assistant)
- 2021–2022: Wales U17
- 2022–2023: Wales U16
- 2023–: Bristol City (first team coach)
- * Club domestic league appearances and goals as of 16 July 2020 ‡ National team caps and goals as of 6 March 2020 (UTC)

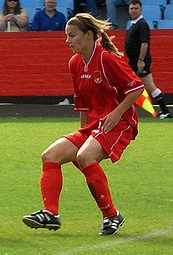

Loren Dykes MBE (born 5 February 1988) is a football coach and player who is the assistant coach for Bristol City and a player for Cardiff City and the Wales women's national football team.

Dykes began her playing career as a winger or forward before being converted into a full-back. She won her 100th cap for Wales on 4 April 2019, in a friendly against the Czech Republic, at Rodney Parade in Newport.

== Early life ==
Dykes attended Cwmtawe Community School and also played for Llanelli Reds.

== Club career ==
Dykes started with Cardiff City Ladies and featured in the UEFA Women's Cup with the Bluebirds, before signing for Bristol Academy during 2008–09.

Dykes played in the 2011 FA Women's Cup final as a winger, then in the 2013 final having retrained as a right-back. Bristol lost both finals to Arsenal.

In July 2020, Dykes announced that she would retire from playing club football and transition into her coaching career; however, she would remain available for selection for her national team. Dykes retired from playing professional football in February 2021.

== International career ==
Dykes won 17 caps and scored four goals for Wales at U-19 level. She made her senior debut, aged 19, in a 2–1 defeat by the Netherlands in August 2007. She played her 100th match for Wales in a friendly against Czech Republic on 4 April 2019.

While attending UWIC, Dykes was called up to represent Welsh universities in the Home Nations championship.

Dykes was appointed Member of the Order of the British Empire (MBE) in the 2020 New Year Honours for services to women's football in Wales.

== Coaching career ==
Dykes became an assistant coach for her former club Bristol City in July 2020.
