= List of English women's football transfers winter 2022–23 =

The 2022–23 English women's football winter transfer window ran from 1 January to 2 February 2023. Players without a club could be signed at any time, clubs could sign players on loan dependent on their league's regulations, and clubs could sign a goalkeeper on an emergency loan if they had no registered senior goalkeeper available. This list includes transfers featuring at least one club from either the Women's Super League or the Women's Championship that were completed after the end of the summer 2022 transfer window on 31 August and before the end of the 2022—23 winter window.

== Transfers ==
All players and clubs without a flag are English.

Date	Name	Moving from	Moving to	Ref.
24 December 2022	Gemma Bonner	(United States) Racing Louisville	Liverpool	
30 December 2022	Charley Clifford	Crystal Palace	Ebbsfleet United	
3 January 2023	Charlotte Wardlaw	Liverpool	Chelsea (end of loan)	
3 January 2023	(Norway) Thea Kyvåg	West Ham United	(Norway) LSK Kvinner	
4 January 2023	Bethany England	Chelsea	Tottenham Hotspur	
4 January 2023	(Wales) Esther Morgan	Coventry United	Tottenham Hotspur (end of loan)	
5 January 2023	(Norway) Guro Bergsvand	(Norway) Brann	Brighton & Hove Albion	
5 January 2023	Jordan Nobbs	Arsenal	Aston Villa	
5 January 2023	Gracie Pearse	Tottenham Hotspur	Bristol City (loan)	
6 January 2023	(Netherlands) Victoria Pelova	(Netherlands) Ajax	Arsenal	
6 January 2023	(Serbia) Dejana Stefanović	(Norway) Vålerenga	Brighton & Hove Albion	
6 January 2023	Hope Smith	Crystal Palace	Millwall Lionesses (loan)	
6 January 2023	(Republic of Ireland) Eleanor Ryan-Doyle	Birmingham City	Coventry United (loan)	
7 January 2023	Claudia Walker	West Ham United	Birmingham City	
7 January 2023	(United States) Brianna Visalli	(United States) Houston Dash	Brighton & Hove Albion	
7 January 2023	(Denmark) Kathrine Møller Kühl	(Denmark) Nordsjælland	Arsenal	
7 January 2023	(Kosovo) Elizabeta Ejupi	Durham	Sunderland	
8 January 2023	(United States) Zoe Morse	(United States) Chicago Red Stars	Brighton & Hove Albion	
8 January 2023	(Wales) Josie Smith	Everton	Wolverhampton Wanderers (dual registration)	
9 January 2023	Lucy Staniforth	Manchester United	Aston Villa	
9 January 2023	Grace Garrad	West Ham United	(Norway) Stabæk	
9 January 2023	(Brazil) Giovana	Everton	Arsenal (end of loan)	
9 January 2023	(Northern Ireland) Rachel Newborough	Charlton Athletic	Coventry United	
10 January 2023	(Denmark) Sofie Lundgaard	(Denmark) Fortuna Hjørring	Liverpool	
10 January 2023	Beth Howard	Bridgwater United	Southampton	
11 January 2023	Lucy Whipp	Unattached	Coventry United	
11 January 2023	Anna Wilcox	Coventry United	Boldmere St. Michaels	
11 January 2023	Alex Hennessy	West Ham United	Charlton Athletic	
11 January 2023	Valentine Pursey	Gillingham	Lewes	
12 January 2023	(Australia) Remy Siemsen	(Australia) Sydney FC	Leicester City	
12 January 2023	Gilly Flaherty	Liverpool	Retired	
12 January 2023	(Northern Ireland) Demi Vance	Leicester City	Unattached	
12 January 2023	Holly Manders	Sunderland	Unattached	
13 January 2023	(Canada) Sabrina D'Angelo	(Sweden) Vittsjö	Arsenal	
13 January 2023	Ellen Jones	Leicester City	Coventry United (loan)	
13 January 2023	Khiara Keating	Manchester City	Coventry United (loan)	
13 January 2023	(Germany) Janina Leitzig	(Germany) Bayern Munich	Leicester City (loan)	
13 January 2023	(Belgium) Amber Tysiak	(Belgium) Oud-Heverlee Leuven	West Ham United	
13 January 2023	(Denmark) Sara Holmgaard	(Denmark) Fortuna Hjørring	Everton (end of loan)	
13 January 2023	(Japan) Maika Hamano	(Japan) INAC Kobe Leonessa	Chelsea	
13 January 2023	(Japan) Maika Hamano	Chelsea	(Sweden) Hammarby (loan)	
13 January 2023	(Wales) Evie Gane	Coventry United	Portsmouth	
14 January 2023	(Japan) Fuka Nagano	(United States) North Carolina Courage	Liverpool	
14 January 2023	Grace Clinton	Manchester United	Bristol City (loan)	
17 January 2023	(Scotland) Cara Milne-Redhead	Coventry United	Unattached	
18 January 2023	(Japan) Mana Iwabuchi	Arsenal	Tottenham Hotspur (loan)	
18 January 2023	Connie Scofield	Leicester City	Coventry United (loan)	
19 January 2023	Miri Taylor	(United States) Angel City	Liverpool	
19 January 2023	(Australia) Lydia Williams	(France) Paris Saint-Germain	Brighton & Hove Albion	
20 January 2023	Georgia Brougham	Leicester City	Unattached	
21 January 2023	Isobel Goodwin	Aston Villa	Coventry United	
21 January 2023	Anouk Denton	(United States) Louisville Cardinals	West Ham United	
21 January 2023	(Netherlands) Aniek Nouwen	Chelsea	(Italy) Milan (loan)	
21 January 2023	(France) Estelle Cascarino	(France) Paris Saint-Germain	Manchester United (loan)	
21 January 2023	(Canada) Jayde Riviere	Unattached	Manchester United	
21 January 2023	Charlotte Wardlaw	Chelsea	Lewes (loan)	
24 January 2023	(Norway) Lisa Naalsund	(Norway) Brann	Manchester United	
24 January 2023	(Australia) Courtney Nevin	(Sweden) Hammarby	Leicester City (loan)	
25 January 2023	Kirsty Barton	Crystal Palace	Unattached	
26 January 2023	Georgia Eaton-Collins	(United States) UCF Knights	Leicester City	
26 January 2023	Aqsa Mushtaq	(Greece) Ergotelis	Lewes	
27 January 2023	Fran Stenson	Birmingham City	Arsenal (end of loan)	
27 January 2023	(Wales) Esther Morgan	Tottenham Hotspur	Sunderland (loan)	
27 January 2023	Mollie Green	Birmingham City	Coventry United (loan)	
27 January 2023	Scarlett Williams	Tottenham Hotspur	Billericay Town (loan)	
28 January 2023	Jade Moore	Manchester United	Reading (loan)	
28 January 2023	Ruby Mace	Manchester City	Leicester City (loan)	
30 January 2023	(Republic of Ireland) Rianna Jarrett	London City Lionesses	Unattached	
30 January 2023	Megan Borthwick	Durham	Sunderland	
30 January 2023	Delphi Cole	Birmingham City	West Bromwich Albion (dual registration)	
31 January 2023	Natasha Flint	Leicester City	(Scotland) Celtic (loan)	
31 January 2023	(Denmark) Amalie Thestrup	(Netherlands) PSV	West Ham United (loan)	
31 January 2023	Olivia McLoughlin	Aston Villa	Birmingham City (loan)	
31 January 2023	Natasha Dowie	Reading	Liverpool (loan)	
31 January 2023	(Cameroon) Easther Mayi Kith	(Sweden) Kristianstad	Reading	
31 January 2023	Shannon Cooke	(United States) LSU Tigers	West Ham United	
31 January 2023	(Gibraltar) Charlyann Pizzarello	Lewes	Newcastle United	
1 February 2023	(Spain) Vicky Losada	Manchester City	(Italy) Roma	
1 February 2023	Kenzie Weir	Everton	Lewes (loan)	
1 February 2023	(Republic of Ireland) Kyra Carusa	(Denmark) HB Køge	London City Lionesses	
1 February 2023	Annie Hutchings	Manchester City	Blackburn Rovers (dual registration)	
2 February 2023	Brooke Cairns	West Ham United	Ipswich Town (dual registration)	
2 February 2023	Chloe Peplow	Crystal Palace	Reading (end of loan)	
2 February 2023	Chloe Peplow	Reading	Southampton (loan)	
3 February 2023	Fran Stenson	Arsenal	Sheffield United (loan)	
3 February 2023	(Northern Ireland) Rachel Furness	Liverpool	Bristol City	
3 February 2023	Lara Miller	Sheffield United	Unattached	
3 February 2023	Anna Pedersen	London City Lionesses	Billericay Town (loan)	
3 February 2023	Nina Wilson	Sheffield United	Wolverhampton Wanderers (loan)	
3 February 2023	Brenna McPartlan	(United States) LSU Tigers	Sunderland	
3 February 2023	Arabella Suttie	Coventry United	Huddersfield Town (loan)	
3 February 2023	Keira Flannery	West Ham United	Gillingham (dual registration)	
3 February 2023	Halle Houssein	West Ham United	Gillingham (dual registration)	
4 February 2023	Tinaya Alexander	(France) Montpellier	Reading	
26 February 2023	Evie Smith	Blackburn Rovers	Liverpool Feds (loan)	
10 March 2023	Leanne Cowan	Unattached	Crystal Palace	
10 March 2023	Emily Wilson-White	Bridgwater United	Crystal Palace	

Player was released to free agency before joining new club
