= 2023–24 Reading F.C. Women season =

Reading
2023–24 season
- Manager: Liam Gilbert
- Stadium: Madejski Stadium; Recreation Ground (select cup matches)
- Women's Championship: 10th
- FA Cup: Fourth Round vs Bristol City
- League Cup: Group Stage
- Top goalscorer: League: Madison Perry (4); All: Charlie Wellings (5); Madison Perry (5)
Home colours	Away colours

The 2023–24 Reading F.C. Women season was the club's 17th season and their first season back in the Women's Championship, the second tier of the football pyramid, since 2013 following relegation the previous season.

== Season events ==
On 28 July, Reading announced the return of Charlie Estcourt to the club from Birmingham City.

On 31 July, Reading announced the signing of Ava Kuyken from Hibernian.

On 3 August, Reading announced the singing of two goalkeepers, Emily Orman on a season-long loan deal from Chelsea, and of free-agent Rose Kite following a successful trial.

On 18 August, Reading announced Liam Gilbert as their new First Team Manager.

On 25 August, Reading announced the signing of Rachel Dugdale from Coventry United. Later the same day, Reading announced the signing of Georgia Wilson from Plymouth Argyle.

On 1 September, Reading announced the signing of Josie Longhurst from Lewes.

On 7 September, Reading announced the season-long loan signing of Halle Houssein from West Ham United.

On 14 September, Reading announced the season-long loan signings of Lulu Jarvis from Brighton & Hove Albion and Freya Gregory from Aston Villa, whilst Caitlin Smith joined on a permanent transfer from Clemson Tigers.

On 21 September, Reading announced that Jackie Burns had signed a new contract with the club.

On 4 January, Reading announced the loan return of Freya Gregory to Aston Villa, the dual registration of Freya Meadows-Tuson with Maidenhead United and the departure of Rose Kite by mutual consent. On the same day, Player Pathway graduate, Mae Hunt, was registered for the first team.

On 11 January, Reading announced the departure of Sanne Troelsgaard from the club by mutual consent.

On 12 January, Reading announced the signing of Jesse Woolley on loan from Bristol City until the end of the season.

On 26 January, Reading announced the signing of Jessie Stapleton on loan from West Ham United for the remainder of the season. Five days later, on 31 January, Keira Flannery also joined Reading on loan from West Ham for the remainder of the season, and the departure of Lily Woodham to Seattle Reign for an undisclosed fee.

On 30 June, Reading announced their withdrawal from the Women's Championship for the upcoming season, moving instead to the Southern Region Women's Football League due to ownership and financial constraints.

== Squad ==
As of match played 28 April 2023

No.	Name	Nationality	Position	Date of birth (age)	Signed from	Signed in	Contract ends	Apps.	Goals
Goalkeepers
1	Emily Orman	(England)	GK	5 November 2002 (aged 21)	on loan from Chelsea	2023	2024	19	0
25	Jackie Burns	(Northern Ireland)	GK	6 March 1997 (aged 27)	Unattached	2022		16	0
41	Eve Annets	(England)	GK	19 March 2006 (aged 18)	Academy	2023		4	0
Defenders
2	Rachel Dugdale	(Northern Ireland)	DF	19 November 1996 (aged 27)	Coventry United	2023		23	0
3	Jessie Stapleton	(Republic of Ireland)	DF	7 February 2005 (aged 19)	on loan from West Ham United	2024	2024	11	1
5	Deanna Cooper	(England)	DF	20 June 1993 (aged 30)	Chelsea	2020	2024	79	4
6	Caitlin Smith	(England)	DF	20 May 2003 (aged 20)	Clemson Tigers	2023		13	0
15	Brooke Hendrix	(United States)	DF	6 May 1993 (aged 30)	Melbourne Victory	2022	2024	34	1
16	Easther Mayi Kith	(Cameroon)	DF	28 March 1997 (aged 27)	Kristianstad	2023	2024	35	0
31	Bethan Roberts	(Wales)	DF	14 May 2003 (aged 20)	Academy	2019		28	1
33	Bella Cox	(England)	DF			2023		0	0
Midfielders
4	Halle Houssein	(England)	MF	11 December 2004 (aged 19)	on loan from West Ham United	2023	2024	19	0
8	Tia Primmer	(England)	MF	2 May 2004 (aged 19)	Academy	2021	2024	58	5
10	Ava Kuyken	(England)	MF	15 June 2001 (aged 22)	Hibernian	2023		0	0
14	Keira Flannery	(England)	MF	24 September 2005 (aged 18)	on loan from West Ham United	2024	2024	10	1
17	Charlie Estcourt	(Wales)	MF	27 May 1998 (aged 25)	Birmingham City	2023		56	2
20	Georgia Wilson	(England)	MF	1 February 2002 (aged 22)	Plymouth Argyle	2023		5	0
21	Mae Hunt	(England)	MF	29 November 2005 (aged 18)	Academy	2021		2	0
22	Amelia Elwood	(England)	MF	3 November 2005 (aged 18)	Academy	2023		17	1
23	Lulu Jarvis	(England)	MF	6 May 2004 (aged 19)	on loan from Brighton & Hove Albion	2023	2024	13	0
24	Josie Longhurst	(Wales)	MF	24 February 2002 (aged 22)	Lewes	2023		21	0
32	Stevie Kennedy	(England)	MF		Academy	2023		0	0
34	Imogen Poile	(England)	MF		Academy	2023		0	0
37	Gesa Marashi	(England)	MF		Academy	2023		0	0
Forwards
7	Charlie Wellings	(England)	FW	18 May 1998 (aged 25)	Celtic	2022		38	10
9	Madison Perry	(England)	FW	24 January 2006 (aged 18)	Academy	2022		21	5
11	Lauren Wade	(Northern Ireland)	FW	22 November 1993 (aged 30)	Glentoran	2022		49	5
27	Jesse Woolley	(England)	FW	27 March 2001 (aged 23)	on loan from Bristol City	2024	2024	11	0
U21
	Anne Thomann	(England)	MF		Academy	2021		0	0
Out on loan
18	Freya Meadows-Tuson	(England)	MF		Academy	2021		3	0
36	Natasha Rasmussen	(England)	MF		Academy	2023		0	0
Left during the season
19	Freya Gregory	(England)	MF	12 January 2003 (aged 21)	on loan from Aston Villa	2023	2024	11	2
27	Rose Kite	(England)	GK	29 January 2001 (aged 23)	Unattached	2023		1	0
28	Lily Woodham	(Wales)	DF	3 September 2000 (aged 23)	Bristol City	2018	2024	84	0
51	Sanne Troelsgaard	(Denmark)	MF	15 August 1988 (aged 35)	Rosengård	2021		52	8

== Transfers ==
=== In ===
Date	Position	Nationality	Name	From	Fee	Ref.
28 July 2023	MF	(Wales)	Charlie Estcourt	Birmingham City	Undisclosed	
31 July 2023	MF	(England)	Ava Kuyken	Hibernian	Undisclosed	
3 August 2023	GK	(England)	Rose Kite	Unattached	Free	
25 August 2023	DF	(Northern Ireland)	Rachel Dugdale	Coventry United	Undisclosed	
25 August 2023	MF	(England)	Georgia Wilson	Plymouth Argyle	Undisclosed	
1 September 2023	MF	(Wales)	Josie Longhurst	Lewes	Undisclosed	
14 September 2023	DF	(England)	Caitlin Smith	Clemson Tigers	Undisclosed	

=== Loans in ===
Start date	Position	Nationality	Name	From	End date	Ref.
3 August 2023	GK	(England)	Emily Orman	Chelsea	End of season	
7 September 2023	MF	(England)	Halle Houssein	West Ham United	End of season	
14 September 2023	MF	(England)	Lulu Jarvis	Brighton & Hove Albion	End of season	
14 September 2023	MF	(England)	Freya Gregory	Aston Villa	4 January 2024	
12 January 2024	FW	(England)	Jesse Woolley	Bristol City	End of season	
26 January 2024	DF	(Republic of Ireland)	Jessie Stapleton	West Ham United	End of season	
31 January 2024	MF	(England)	Keira Flannery	West Ham United	End of season	

=== Out ===
Date	Position	Nationality	Name	To	Fee	Ref.
8 August 2023	DF	(Republic of Ireland)	Diane Caldwell	Zürich	Undisclosed	
31 January 2024	DF	(Wales)	Lily Woodham	Seattle Reign	Undisclosed	

=== Loans out ===
Start date	Position	Nationality	Name	To	End date	Ref.
September 2023	MF	(England)	Natasha Rasmussen	Maidenhead United	dual-registration	
4 January 2024	MF	(England)	Freya Meadows-Tuson	Maidenhead United	dual-registration	

=== Released ===
Date	Position	Nationality	Name	Joined	Date	Ref.
4 January 2024	GK	(England)	Rose Kite	Moneyfields	13 January 2024	
11 January 2024	MF	(Denmark)	Sanne Troelsgaard	AS Roma	2 February 2024	
30 June 2024	GK	(England)	Eve Annets	Manchester City	5 August 2024	
30 June 2024	GK	(Northern Ireland)	Jackie Burns	Bristol City	7 August 2024	
30 June 2024	DF	(Cameroon)	Easther Mayi Kith	Saint-Étienne	19 July 2024	
30 June 2024	DF	(England)	Deanna Cooper	Newcastle United	5 July 2024	
30 June 2024	DF	(United States)	Brooke Hendrix	Tampa Bay Sun	1 July 2024	
30 June 2024	MF	(Wales)	Bethan Roberts	Rugby Borough	17 July 2024	
30 June 2024	MF	(England)	Amelia Elwood	Texas Tech Red Raiders		
30 June 2024	MF	(England)	Mae Hunt	South Alabama Jaguars		
30 June 2024	MF	(England)	Ava Kuyken	Plymouth Argyle	3 August 2024	
30 June 2024	MF	(England)	Tia Primmer	Blackburn Rovers	11 October 2024	
30 June 2024	MF	(England)	Georgia Wilson	Plymouth Argyle	8 August 2024	
30 June 2024	MF	(Wales)	Charlie Estcourt	DC Power	10 July 2024	
30 June 2024	MF	(Wales)	Josie Longhurst	Whitecaps FC Girls Elite	22 July 2024	
30 June 2024	FW	(England)	Madison Perry	Watford	16 August 2024	
30 June 2024	FW	(England)	Charlie Wellings	Nottingham Forest	19 July 2024	
30 June 2024	FW	(Northern Ireland)	Lauren Wade	Heart of Midlothian	5 July 2024	

== Friendlies ==
6 August 2023	Portsmouth	2–2	Reading	Havant
14:00 BST (UTC+1)	Lumsden 10', 63'	Report	Hendrix 2'; Perry 32'	Stadium: Westleigh Park
Note: Game composed of three 30 minute periods.

13 August 2023	Lewes	v	Reading	Lewes
14:00 BST (UTC+1)				Stadium: The Dripping Pan

== Competitions ==
=== Overview ===
Competition	First match	Last match	Starting round	Final position	Record							
Competition	First match	Last match	Starting round	Final position	Pld	W	D	L	GF	GA	GD	Win %
Championship	27 August 2023	28 April 2024	Matchday 1	10th	22	5	7	10	20	40	−20	22.73
FA Cup	10 December 2023	14 January 2024	Third round	Fourth round	2	1	0	1	5	2	+3	50.00
EFL Cup	11 October 2023	24 January 2024	Group Stage	Group Stage	4	0	1	3	1	14	−13	0.00
Total					28	6	8	14	26	56	−30	21.43

Last updated: 28 April 2024
Source: Competitions

=== Women's Championship ===
==== Results summary ====
Overall								Home						Away					
Pld	W	D	L	GF	GA	GD	Pts	W	D	L	GF	GA	GD	W	D	L	GF	GA	GD
22	5	7	10	19	38	−19	22	3	3	5	7	17	−10	2	4	5	12	21	−9

Last updated: 28 April 2024.
Source: The FA

==== Results by matchday ====
Matchday	1	2	3	4	5	6	7	8	9	10	12	14	15	17	16^{3}	18	13^{2}	19	20	11^{1}	21	22
Ground	A	H	A	H	A	H	A	H	A	H	H	A	H	H	A	A	H	A	H	A	H	A
Result	D	D	D	L	W	W	L	L	L	D	D	D	W	L	W	L	L	L	L	D	W	L
Position	6	8	8	10	7	6	6	9	10	10	10	9	9	10	8	10	10	10	10	10	9	10

Updated to match(es) played on 28 April 2024. Source: Results
A = Away; H = Home; W = Win; D = Draw; L = Loss; P = Postponed
Notes:
- ^{1} Matchday 11 (vs Blackburn Rovers) was postponed due to a waterlogged pitch.
- ^{2} Matchday 13 (vs Birmingham City) was postponed due to an illness.
- ^{3} Matchday 16 (vs Charlton Athletic) was postponed due to a waterlogged pitch.

==== Results ====
27 August 2023 1	Crystal Palace	1–1	Reading	Sutton
14:30 BST (UTC+1)	Blanchard (yellow card) 59'; Everett (yellow card) 70'; Arthur (yellow card) 84'; Guyatt (yellow card) 87'; Hughes 90+12'	Report	Estcourt (yellow card) 32'; Wade (yellow card) 44'; Cooper 88'	Stadium: Gander Green Lane; Referee: Lauren Impey

2 September 2023 2	Reading	0–0	Charlton Athletic	Reading
17:15 BST (UTC+1)	Woodham (yellow card) 45+2'; Primmer (yellow card) 45+3'; Troelsgaard (red card) 49'	Report	Ross (yellow card) 80'; Green (yellow card) 90+5'	Stadium: Madejski Stadium; Referee: Melissa Burgin

10 September 2023 3	London City Lionesses	1–1	Reading	Dartford
14:00 BST (UTC+1)	Boye-Hlorkah 45' (yellow card) 81'; Moloney (yellow card) 85'; Brougham (yellow card) 87'	Report	Wade (yellow card) 64' (goal) 90+6'; Woodham (yellow card) 90+8'	Stadium: Princes Park; Referee: Stacey Fullicks

17 September 2023 4	Reading	1–4	Southampton	Reading
12:00 BST (UTC+1)	Elwood (yellow card) 84'; Estcourt 90+3'	Report	Pike 10'; Wilkinson 28' (pen.); Primus 73'; Purfield 82'	Stadium: Madejski Stadium; Referee: Adewunmi Soneye

1 October 2023 5	Durham	0–2	Reading	Durham
12:00 BST (UTC+1)	Clarke (yellow card) 25'; Bradley (yellow card) 72'	Report	Gregory 61'; Primmer (yellow card) 69'; Cooper (yellow card) 81'; Elwood 90+2'	Stadium: Maiden Castle; Referee: Levi Gray

8 October 2023 6	Reading	1–0	Lewes	Reading
13:00 BST (UTC+1)	Dugdale (yellow card) 21'; Primmer 77'	Report	Whitehouse (yellow card) 21'; Hazard (yellow card) 57'; Cleverly (yellow card) 68'	Stadium: Madejski Stadium; Referee: Magdalena Golba

15 October 2023 7	Sunderland	3–1	Reading	Hetton-le-Hole
14:00 BST (UTC+1)	Jones 44'; Ejupi 51'; Kitching 62'	Report	Gregory 74'	Stadium: Eppleton Colliery Welfare Ground; Referee: Jon Ashworth-Sears

22 October 2023 8	Reading	1–3	Sheffield United	Reading
12:00 BST (UTC+1)	Primmer (yellow card) 79' (goal) 90+5'; Woodham (yellow card) 90+8'	Report	Brown (yellow card) 22'; Hodson 33'; Goodwin 48'; Newsham 72'	Stadium: Madejski Stadium; Referee: Grace Lowe

5 November 2023 9	Birmingham City	2–1	Reading	Birmingham
14:00 GMT (UTC)	Devlin 28', 36'; Smith (yellow card) 64'	Report	Cooper 53'; Troelsgaard (yellow card) 90+4'	Stadium: St Andrew's; Referee: Magdalena Golba

12 November 2023 10	Reading	0–0	Watford	Reading
12:00 GMT (UTC)	Gregory (yellow card) 61'	Report	Fleming (yellow card) 44'; Bennett (yellow card) 50'	Stadium: Madejski Stadium; Referee: Sophie Dennington

17 December 2023 12	Reading	1–1	Crystal Palace	Reading
13:00 GMT (UTC)	Wade 39'; Primmer (yellow card) 87'	Report	Hughes 30'; Potter (yellow card) 59'	Stadium: Madejski Stadium; Referee: Megan Wilson

28 January 2024 14	Lewes	2–2	Reading	Lewes
14:00 GMT (UTC)	Farrugia 13'; Riglar 29'; Whitehouse (yellow card) 40'	Report	Hendrix (yellow card) 26'; Primmer (yellow card) 71' (yellow-red card) 90+7'; Roberts 81'; Stapleton (yellow card) 90+2'; Wellings 90+4'	Stadium: The Dripping Pan; Referee: Jade Wardle

4 February 2024 15	Reading	1–0	Sunderland	Reading
12:00 GMT (UTC)	Stapleton (yellow card) 51'; Perry 77'; Wade (yellow card) 85'	Report	Griffiths (red card) 35'; McCatty (yellow card) 83'	Stadium: Madejski Stadium; Referee: Laura Van Lier

3 March 2024 17	Reading	1–2	London City Lionesses	Reading
13:00 GMT (UTC)	Hendrix 45+1'; Stapleton (yellow card) 59'; Primmer (yellow card) 82'	Report	Satchell 54'; Mukandi 57'; Littlejohn (yellow card) 62'; Culver (yellow card) 83'	Stadium: Madejski Stadium; Referee: Jade Wardle

10 March 2024 16	Charlton Athletic	0–1	Reading	Crayford
14:00 GMT (UTC)	Green (penalty missed) 28'	Report	Wellings 42'	Stadium: The Oakwood; Referee: Laura Van Lier
Note: Match originally scheduled for 18 February, but postponed on 18 February due to a waterlogged pitch.

17 March 2024 18	Southampton	5–0	Reading	Southampton
14:00 GMT (UTC)	Wilkinson 17', 35'; Morris 27'; Pharoah 54', 67'	Report		Stadium: St Mary's Stadium; Referee: Lauren Whiteman

20 March 2024 13	Reading	0–4	Birmingham City	Reading
19:00 GMT (UTC)	Flannery (yellow card) 33'	Report	Moore 12'; Smith 30'; Agg 56', 79'	Stadium: Madejski Stadium; Referee: Laura Van Lier
Note: Match originally scheduled for 21 January, but postponed on 19 January due to an illness with the Reading squad.

24 March 2024 19	Sheffield United	5–1	Reading	Sheffield
14:00 GMT (UTC)	Stapleton 14' (o.g.); Bourne 52'; Goodwin 69', 73'; Rayner 81'	Report	Perry 62'; Estcourt (yellow card) 89'	Stadium: Bramall Lane; Referee: Magdalena Golba

31 March 2024 20	Reading	1–4	Blackburn Rovers	Reading
12:00 BST (UTC+1)	Flannery 16'	Report	Hornby 43', 86'; Coan 45+2'; Shepherd 70'	Stadium: Madejski Stadium; Referee: Levi Gray

14 April 2024 11	Blackburn Rovers	0–0	Reading	Leyland
14:00 BST (UTC+1)	Hornby (yellow card) 52'	Report	Estcourt (yellow card) 14'	Stadium: County Ground; Referee: Aimee Keir
Note: Match originally scheduled for, and postponed on, 19 November due to a waterlogged pitch.

21 April 2024 21	Reading	2–1	Durham	Reading
12:00 BST (UTC+1)	Flannery (yellow card) 56'; Stapleton 66'; Primmer (yellow card) 79'	Report	Bradley (red card) 32'; Briggs (yellow card) 51'	Stadium: Madejski Stadium; Referee: Stacey Pearson

28 April 2024 22	Watford	3–2	Reading	Watford
14:00 BST (UTC+1)	Johns 16'; Haines (yellow card) 16' (goal) 76'; Georgiou 45+5'; Harbert (yellow card) 56'; Agyemang (yellow card) 59'	Report	Woolley (yellow card) 59'; Perry 71', 80'	Stadium: Vicarage Road; Referee: Ali Rahjoo

==== Table ====
Pos	Team	Pld	W	D	L	GF	GA	GD	Pts	Qualification
8	London City Lionesses	22	7	4	11	26	36	−10	25	
9	Durham	22	6	5	11	24	44	−20	23	
10	Reading	22	5	7	10	20	40	−20	22	
11	Lewes (R)	22	4	4	14	22	39	−17	16	Relegation to the Southern Premier Division
12	Watford (R)	22	4	3	15	22	44	−22	15	Relegation to the Southern Premier Division

Rules for classification: 1) Points; 2) Goal difference; 3) Number of goals scored
(R) Relegated

=== FA Cup ===
10 December 2023 Third round	Cheltenham Town	0–4	Reading	Bishop's Cleeve
14:00 GMT (UTC)	Jones (yellow card) 7'; Billingham (yellow card) 35'; Buxton (yellow card) 90'	Report	Cooper 9'; Wade 11'; Wellings 46', 47'; Smith (yellow card) 70'; Kith (yellow card) 90'	Stadium: Kayte Lane Stadium

14 January 2024 Fourth round	Reading	1–2	Wolverhampton Wanderers	Aldershot
14:00 GMT (UTC)	Perry 35'	Report	Fergusson (yellow card) 56'; Will (yellow card) 64'; Merrick 73'; Toussaint 88'	Stadium: Recreation Ground; Referee: Aimee Keir

=== League Cup ===
==== Group stage ====
Pos	Team	Pld	W	PW	PL	L	GF	GA	GD	Pts	Qualification
1	Arsenal (Q)	4	3	1	0	0	14	5	+9	11	Advanced to knock-out stage
2	Tottenham Hotspur	3	2	0	1	0	12	3	+9	7	Possible knock-out stage based on ranking
3	Southampton	3	1	1	0	1	3	3	0	5	
4	Bristol City (E)	4	0	0	2	2	3	8	−5	2	
5	Reading (E)	4	0	1	0	3	1	14	−13	2	

Updated to match(es) played on 24 January 2024. Source: FA Women's League Cup
Rules for classification: 1) Points; 2) Goal difference; 3) Number of goals scored; 4) Number of wins; 5) Head-to-head record
(E) Eliminated; (Q) Qualified to the phase indicated

11 October 2023 1	Tottenham Hotspur	6–0	Reading	Leyton
19:30 BST (UTC+1)	Zhang Linyan 12'; Graham 21'; Ale 47'; Percival 56'; Naz 62'; Thomas 71'; Ayane (yellow card) 85'	Report		Stadium: Brisbane Road; Attendance: 531; Referee: Amy Fearns

8 November 2023 2	Reading	0–1	Southampton	Aldershot
19:00 GMT (UTC)	Gregory (yellow card) 61'	Report	Kraft (yellow card) 32'; Lloyd-Smith 85'	Stadium: Recreation Ground; Attendance: 235; Referee: Stacey Fullicks

13 December 2023 3	Bristol City	1–1 (4–5 p)	Reading	Failand
19:30 GMT (UTC)	Hayles 21'; Kendall (yellow card) 90+6'	Report	Mayi Kith (yellow card) 68'; Wellings 86'	Stadium: Robins High Performance Centre
	Penalties
	Rodgers (penalty missed); Jones (penalty scored); Woolley (penalty scored); Hayles (penalty scored); Thestrup (penalty scored); Napier (penalty missed)		Nielsen (penalty scored); Wade (penalty scored); Wellings (penalty scored); Primmer (penalty scored); Woodham (penalty missed); Houssein (penalty scored)

24 January 2024 4	Reading	0–6	Arsenal	Reading
19:00 GMT (UTC)	Primmer (yellow card) 41'	Report	Foord 23'; Blackstenius 35', 45', 84'; Codina 51'; Mead 80'; Catley (yellow card) 88'	Stadium: Madejski Stadium; Attendance: 3,784; Referee: Levi Gray

== Squad statistics ==
As of match played 28 April 2024

=== Appearances ===
No.	Pos	Nat	Player	Total		Championship		FA Cup		League Cup	
No.	Pos	Nat	Player	Apps	Goals	Apps	Goals	Apps	Goals	Apps	Goals
1	GK	(England) ENG	Emily Orman	19	0	17	0	2	0	0	0
2	DF	(Northern Ireland) NIR	Rachel Dugdale	23	0	18+3	0	2	0	0	0
3	DF	(Republic of Ireland) IRL	Jessie Stapleton	11	1	11	1	0	0	0	0
4	MF	(England) ENG	Halle Houssein	19	0	13	0	2	0	2+2	0
5	DF	(England) ENG	Deanna Cooper	19	3	10+6	2	1	1	1+1	0
6	DF	(England) ENG	Caitlin Smith	13	0	2+5	0	1+1	0	4	0
7	FW	(England) ENG	Charlie Wellings	12	5	5+3	2	2	2	1+1	1
8	MF	(England) ENG	Tia Primmer	21	2	13+2	2	2	0	1+3	0
9	FW	(England) ENG	Madison Perry	16	5	9+4	4	2	1	0+1	0
11	FW	(Northern Ireland) NIR	Lauren Wade	28	3	22	2	2	1	2+2	0
14	MF	(England) ENG	Keira Flannery	10	1	10	1	0	0	0	0
15	DF	(United States) USA	Brooke Hendrix	25	1	18+1	1	2	0	3+1	0
16	DF	(Cameroon) CMR	Easther Mayi Kith	25	0	17+2	0	1+1	0	4	0
17	MF	(Wales) WAL	Charlie Estcourt	27	1	20+1	1	2	0	3+1	0
20	MF	(England) ENG	Georgia Wilson	5	0	0+3	0	0	0	2	0
21	MF	(England) ENG	Mae Hunt	2	0	0+1	0	0	0	0+1	0
22	MF	(England) ENG	Amelia Elwood	17	1	0+13	1	0	0	3+1	0
23	MF	(England) ENG	Lulu Jarvis	13	0	0+8	0	0+1	0	3+1	0
24	MF	(Wales) WAL	Josie Longhurst	21	0	5+11	0	0+1	0	4	0
25	GK	(Northern Ireland) NIR	Jackie Burns	4	0	4	0	0	0	0	0
27	FW	(England) ENG	Jesse Woolley	11	0	10	0	0+1	0	0	0
31	DF	(Wales) WAL	Bethan Roberts	14	1	12+1	1	0	0	0+1	0
41	GK	(England) ENG	Eve Annets	4	0	1	0	0	0	3	0
Players away from the club on loan:
18	MF	(England) ENG	Freya Meadows-Tuson	3	0	0+1	0	0	0	2	0
Players who appeared for Reading but left during the season:
19	MF	(England) ENG	Freya Gregory	11	2	6+2	2	0+1	0	1+1	0
27	GK	(England) ENG	Rose Kite	1	0	0	0	0	0	1	0
28	DF	(Wales) WAL	Lily Woodham	16	0	12	0	1	0	1+2	0
51	MF	(Denmark) DEN	Sanne Troelsgaard	12	0	7+1	0	0+1	0	3	0

=== Goal scorers ===
Place	Position	Nation	Number	Name	Championship	FA Cup	League Cup	Total
1	FW	(England)	9	Madison Perry	4	1	0	5
1	FW	(England)	7	Charlie Wellings	2	2	1	5
3	DF	(England)	5	Deanna Cooper	2	1	0	3
3	FW	(Northern Ireland)	11	Lauren Wade	2	1	0	3
5	MF	(England)	19	Freya Gregory	2	0	0	2
5	MF	(England)	8	Tia Primmer	2	0	0	2
7	MF	(Wales)	17	Charlie Estcourt	1	0	0	1
7	MF	(England)	22	Amelia Elwood	1	0	0	1
7	DF	(Wales)	31	Bethan Roberts	1	0	0	1
7	DF	(United States)	15	Brooke Hendrix	1	0	0	1
7	MF	(England)	14	Keira Flannery	1	0	0	1
7	DF	(Republic of Ireland)	3	Jessie Stapleton	1	0	0	1
Total					20	5	1	26

=== Clean sheets ===
Place	Position	Nation	Number	Name	Championship	FA Cup	League Cup	Total
1	GK	(England)	1	Emily Orman	6	1	0	7
2	GK	(England)	25	Jackie Burns	2	0	0	2
Total					8	1	0	9

=== Disciplinary record ===
Number	Nation	Position	Name	Championship		FA Cup		League Cup		Total	
Number	Nation	Position	Name	Booked	Sent off (straight red)	Booked	Sent off (straight red)	Booked	Sent off (straight red)	Booked	Sent off (straight red)
2	(Northern Ireland)	DF	Rachel Dugdale	1	0	0	0	0	0	1	0
3	(Republic of Ireland)	DF	Jessie Stapleton	3	0	0	0	0	0	3	0
5	(England)	DF	Deanna Cooper	1	0	0	0	0	0	1	0
6	(England)	DF	Caitlin Smith	0	0	1	0	0	0	1	0
8	(England)	MF	Tia Primmer	8	1	0	0	1	0	9	1
11	(Northern Ireland)	FW	Lauren Wade	3	0	0	0	0	0	3	0
14	(England)	MF	Keira Flannery	2	0	0	0	0	0	2	0
15	(United States)	DF	Brooke Hendrix	1	0	0	0	0	0	1	0
16	(Cameroon)	DF	Easther Mayi Kith	0	0	1	0	1	0	2	0
17	(Wales)	MF	Charlie Estcourt	3	0	0	0	0	0	3	0
22	(England)	MF	Amelia Elwood	1	0	0	0	0	0	1	0
27	(England)	FW	Jesse Woolley	1	0	0	0	0	0	1	0
Players away on loan:
Players who left Reading during the season:
19	(England)	MF	Freya Gregory	1	0	0	0	1	0	2	0
28	(Wales)	DF	Lily Woodham	3	0	0	0	0	0	3	0
51	(Denmark)	MF	Sanne Troelsgaard	1	1	0	0	0	0	1	1
Total				29	2	2	0	3	0	34	2
