= Ava Kuyken =

English footballer (born 2001)

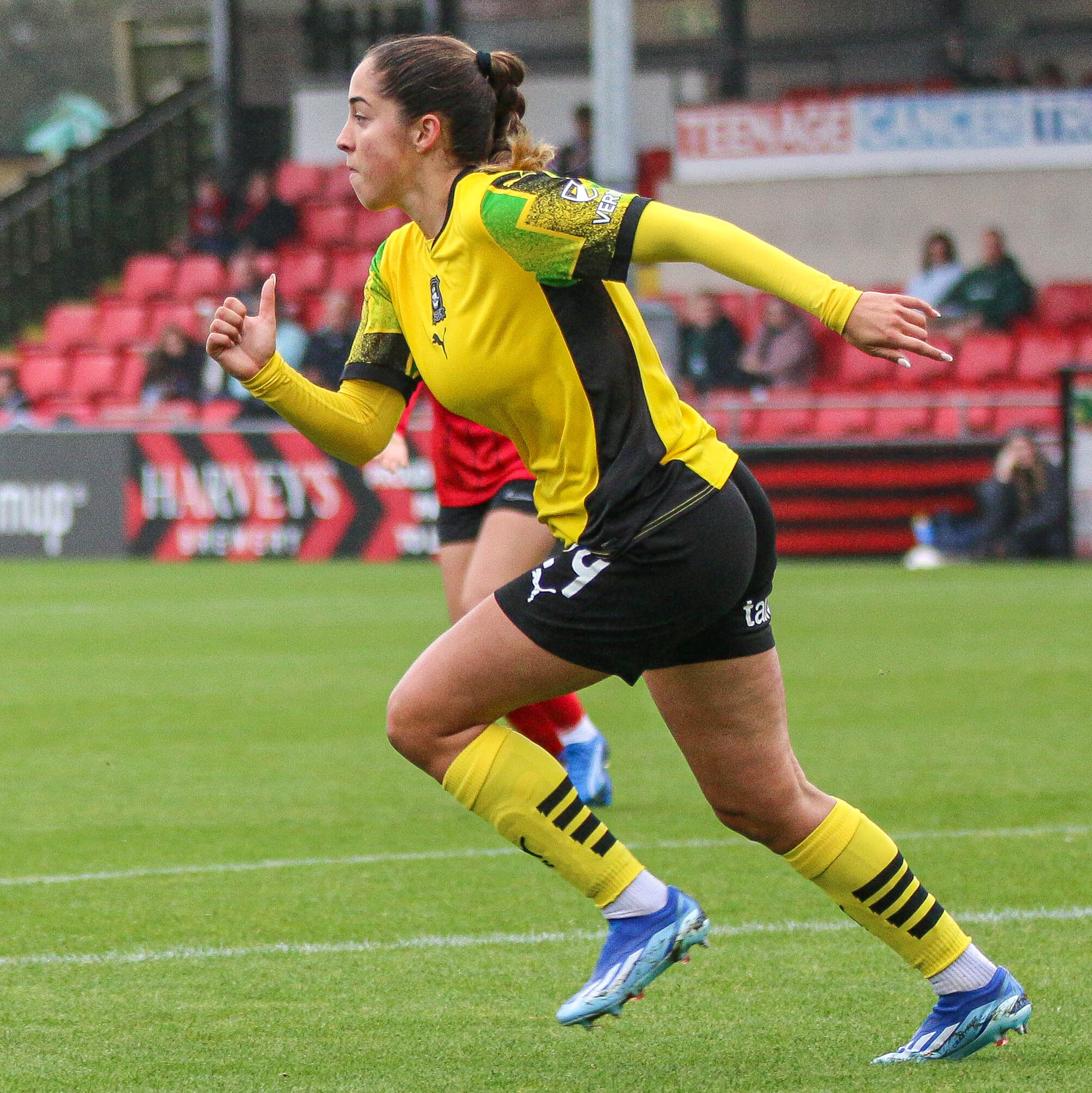
- Plymouth Argyle Women in 2024

Personal information
- Full name: Ava Kuyken
- Date of birth: 15 June 2001 (age 25)
- Place of birth: Oxford, England
- Height: 1.69 m (5 ft 7 in)
- Position: Midfielder

Team information
- Current team: Watford
- Number: 8

Youth career
- Arsenal

College career
Years	Team	Apps	(Gls)
2019–2021	Florida Gators	27	(1)

Senior career*
Years	Team	Apps	(Gls)
2017–2019	Arsenal	10	(0)
2021–2022	Bristol City	15	(0)
2022–2023	Hibernian	18	(0)
2023–2024	Reading	0	(0)
2024–2025	Plymouth Argyle	20	(0)
2025–	Watford	13	(0)

International career^{‡}
2017–2018	England U17	9	(0)
2019–2020	England U19	3	(0)
- * Club domestic league appearances and goals as of 07:31, 19 July 2024 (UTC) ‡ National team caps and goals as of 19 January 2020

Ava Kuyken (born 15 June 2001) is an English footballer who plays as a midfielder for Watford in the FA Women's National League South. An Arsenal Academy graduate, Kuyken made her 1st team debut age 16 for their 1st team. She went on to make ten appearances for the Gunners, winning the FA WSL title and Continental Cup medals across the 2017–18 and 2018–19 seasons.

== Club career ==
=== Arsenal Women Football Club ===
Kuyken made her competitive debut for Arsenal Women on 16 November 2017 against Watford in the Continental Cup as a substitute in the 80th minute, coming on for Heather O'Reilly. She made her Women's Super League debut on 7 February 2018 against Liverpool as a substitute in the 87th minute, coming on for Jordan Nobbs. She was a regular named squad player throughout the 2017–18 season, when Arsenal won the Continental Cup, progressed to the final of the FA Cup and finished 3rd in the Women's Super League. She made four appearances in her first year with the 1st team.

2018–19 saw another year with the Arsenal Women, alongside competing her A-Level studies at Cherwell School in Oxford. She made her first full debut on 5 December aged 17 with a 5,0 win against Charlton Athletic WFC in the Continental Cup. She made her full debut in the WSL on 27 January 2019 against Reading WFC, in a game they won 3–0. She was a regular named squad member throughout the season making, making 12 appearances in the WSL (7), 3 in the Continental Cup and 2 in the FA Cup. They won the 2018/2019 WSL League and progressed to the Continental Cup Final losing to Manchester City in penalties. She was named as youth player of the year in a round of the year by the Daily Cannon. Alongside her first team duties Kuyken played with the Arsenal U21 squad. This included the FA Cup, which they won 4–0 against Manchester United.

=== University of Florida ===
In August 2019, she took up a college scholarship with the Florida Gators, who compete in Division I of the National Collegiate Athletics Association and the Southeastern Conference. As a freshman, Kuyken was a regular player, being one of only 19 freshman who have started regularly in the program's 25-year history. She made 27 appearances for the Gators and scored one goal.

=== Bristol City Women ===
Kuyken played for Bristol City in the FA Women's Championship in the 2021–2022 season, making 19 appearances for the Robins with 15 of those outings coming in the FA Women's Championship.

=== Hibernian ===
In 2022–23, Kuyken played in the Scottish League with Hibernian. She made 26 first team appearances for the club, scoring once.

=== Reading ===
In July 2023, Kuyken signed for Reading, returning to English football. At the start of August, Kuyken was ruled out of the 2023–24 season after rupturing her ACL. On 2 July 2024, Reading announced the departure of Kuyken after their demotion to the Southern Region Women's Football League.

=== Plymouth Argyle ===
In August 2024, Kuyken signed for Plymouth Argyle.

=== Watford ===
In July 2025, Kuyken joined Watford.

== International career ==
=== England ===
Kuyken was selected and played consistently for England through the U15, U16, U17, U18 and U19s youth teams. In 2017–18 the England U17 squad qualified via the elite rounds to the FIFA European finals in Lithuania. Kuyken made full appearances against Spain, Finland and Germany. They progressed to the semi-final, where they were knocked out by Germany. In 2019 with the U18s she played in a friendly games, including against Canada and Scotland. In 2019/2020, she was selected for the UEFA Women's U19 Championship Euros 1st qualifying round in Belarus. They beat Cyprus 8–0 and Belarus 3–0.

Kuyken has dual UK-USA nationality.

== Honours ==
Arsenal

- FA Women's League Cup: 2017–18
