= Georgia Wilson (footballer) =

English footballer

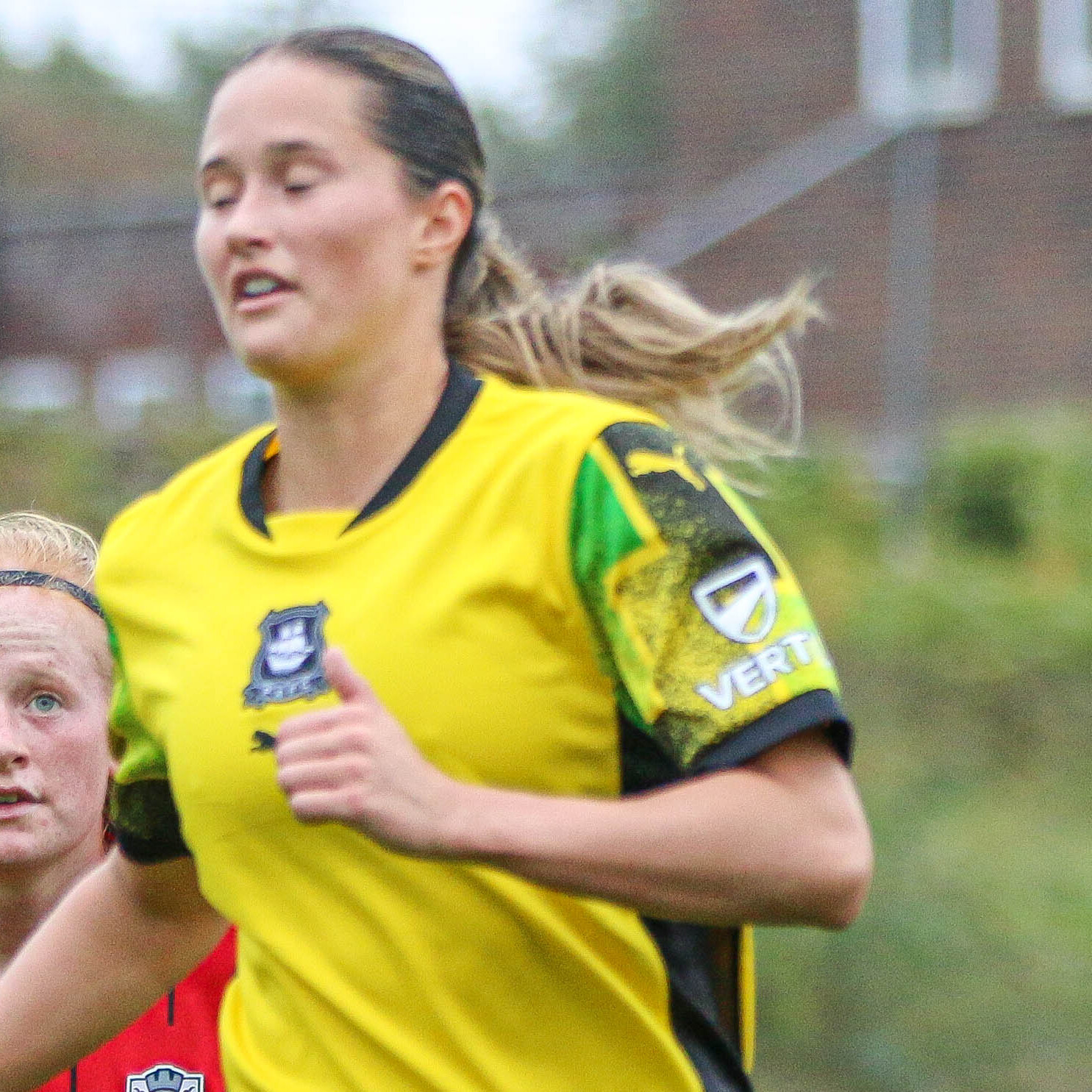
- Wilson in 2024

Personal information
- Full name: Georgia Wilson
- Date of birth: 1 February 2002 (age 24)
- Place of birth: Plymouth, England
- Position: Midfielder

Youth career
- -2019: Bristol City

College career
Years	Team	Apps	(Gls)
- SGS College

Senior career*
Years	Team	Apps	(Gls)
2019–2021	Bristol City	10	(0)
2021–2022	AaB	10	(0)
2022–2023	Plymouth Argyle	13	(2)
2023–2024	Reading	3	(0)
2024–2025	Plymouth Argyle	22	(3)
2025–	AFC Bournmouth	21	(6)
- * Club domestic league appearances and goals as of 19 July 2024

Georgia Dee Wilson (born 1 February 2002) is an English footballer who played for Reading in the Women's Championship.

== Playing career ==
=== Bristol City ===
On 15 September 2019 Wilson made her senior debut for Bristol City in a 2–0 defeat away to Everton. She scored her first goal for the club on 11 December 2019 in a 5–2 win over Charlton Athletic in the League Cup. Wilson left at the end of the 2020–21 FAWSL season.

=== Plymouth Argyle ===
On 20 June 2023, Plymouth Argyle announced Wilson on their retained list for the 2023/24 season.

=== Reading ===
On 25 August 2023, Reading announced the permanent signing of Wilson from AaB. On 2 July 2024, Reading announced the departure of Wilson after their demotion to the Southern Region Women's Football League.

== Career statistics ==
=== Club ===
As of match played 20 March 2024

Appearances and goals by club, season and competition
Club	Season	League			National Cup		League Cup		Total	
Club	Season	Division	Apps	Goals	Apps	Goals	Apps	Goals	Apps	Goals
Bristol City	2019–20	FA WSL	8	0	0	0	5	1	13	1
Bristol City	2020–21	FA WSL	2	0	0	0	1	0	3	0
Bristol City	Total		10	0	0	0	6	1	16	1
AaB	2021–22	A-Liga	10	0	0	0	-		10	0
Plymouth Argyle	2022–23	FA Women's National League South	13	2			-		19	6
Reading	2023–24	Women's Championship	3	0	0	0	2	0	5	0
Plymouth Argyle	2024–25	FA Women's National League South	22	3	4	0	3	5	29	8
Plymouth Argyle	2025–26	FA Women's National League South	21	6	2	2	5	1	28	9
Career total			79	11	6	2	16	7	107	24
