= Lauren Wade =

Northern Irish footballer

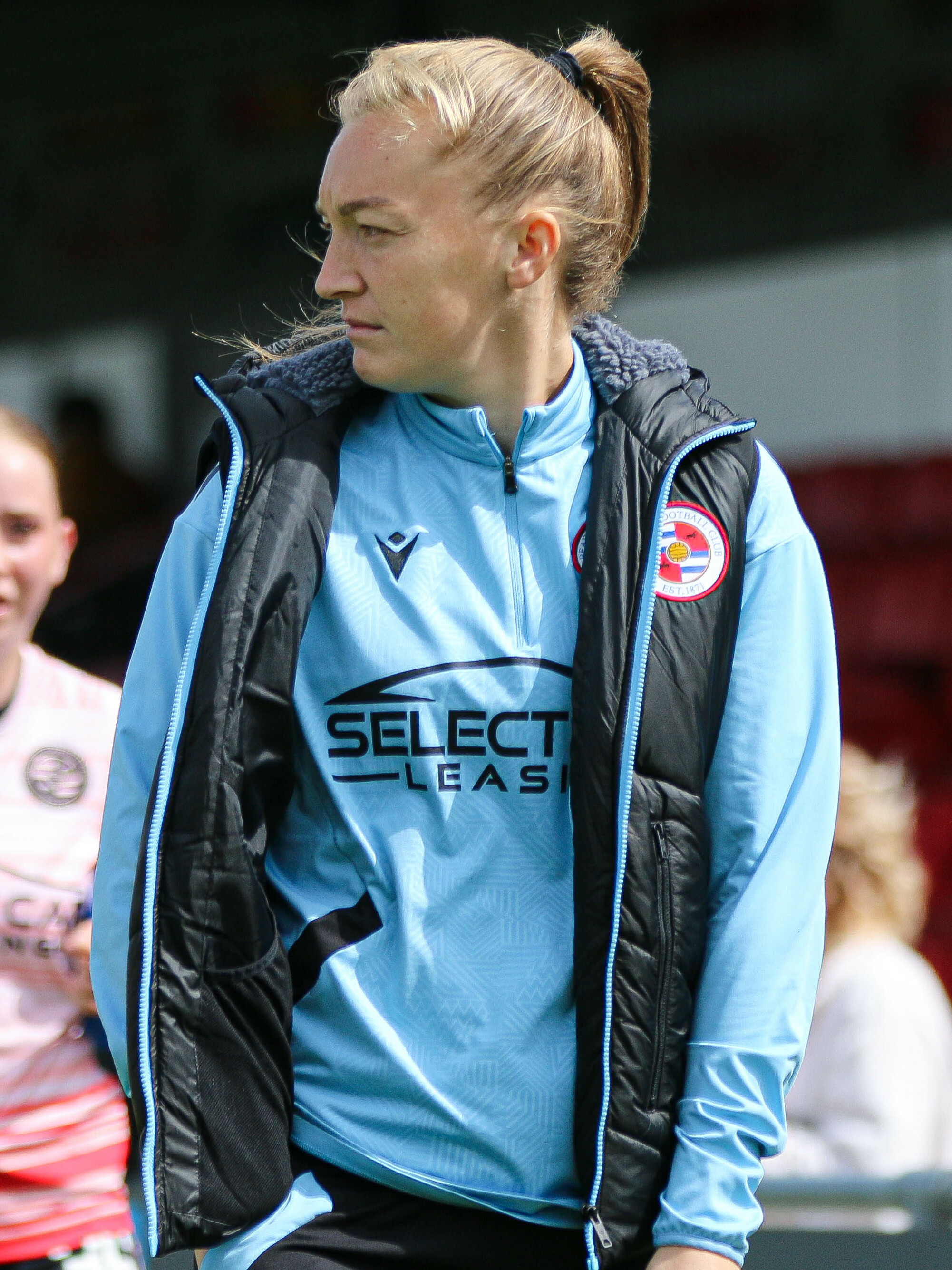

Personal information
- Date of birth: 22 November 1993 (age 32)
- Place of birth: Coleraine, Northern Ireland
- Height: 1.72 m (5 ft 8 in)
- Position: Midfielder

Team information
- Current team: Heart of Midlothian
- Number: 11

College career
Years	Team	Apps	(Gls)
2016–2017	Carson–Newman Eagles	23	(18)

Senior career*
Years	Team	Apps	(Gls)
	Coleraine	0	(0)
2014–2015	Glentoran	0	(0)
2017	Umeå IK	5	(2)
2020–2021	Glasgow City	1	(1)
2021–2022	Glentoran		
2022–2024	Reading	37	(3)
2024–	Heart of Midlothian	0	(0)

International career^{‡}
2015–	Northern Ireland	53	(9)
- * Club domestic league appearances and goals as of 10:05, 30 April 2024 (UTC) ‡ National team caps and goals as of 28 February 2024

Lauren Wade (born 22 November 1993) is a Northern Irish footballer who plays as a midfielder for Heart of Midlothian and has appeared for the Northern Ireland women's national team.

She has previously played for Coleraine, Glentoran, Umeå IK, Glasgow City, and Reading.

== Club career ==
=== Reading ===
On 5 August 2022, Reading announced the double signing of Wade.

=== Hearts ===
On 5 July 2024, Wade joined Scottish Women's Premier League team Heart of Midlothian on a deal until 2026.

== International career ==
Wade has been capped for the Northern Ireland national team, appearing for the team during the 2019 FIFA Women's World Cup qualifying cycle.

Wade was part of the squad that was called up to the UEFA Women's Euro 2022.

She won her 50th cap in a fixture against Albania in the 2023-24 UEFA Women's Nations League on 26 September 2023; Wade was introduced at half-time, taking the captain's armband from Sarah McFadden, who was making her 100th appearance for the national side. Wade went on to score the winning goal in a 1-0 victory.

== Career statistics ==
As of match played 28 April 2024

Appearances and goals by club, season and competition
Club	Season	League			National Cup		League Cup		Continental		Other		Total	
Club	Season	Division	Apps	Goals	Apps	Goals	Apps	Goals	Apps	Goals	Apps	Goals	Apps	Goals
Reading	2022–23	FA Women's Super League	15	1	3	0	3	1	—		—		21	2
Reading	2023–24	Women's Championship	22	2	2	1	4	0	—		—		28	3
Heart of Midlothian	2024–25	Scottish Women's Premier League	0	0	0	0	0	0	—		—		0	0
Career total			37	3	5	1	7	1	-	-	-	-	49	5

=== International goals ===
No.	Date	Venue	Opponent	Score	Result	Competition
1.	28 February 2018	Side, Turkey	Kazakhstan	2–0	2–0	2018 Turkish Women's Cup
2.	18 September 2020	Tórsvøllur, Tórshavn, Faroe Islands	Faroe Islands	3–0	6–0	UEFA Women's Euro 2022 qualifying
3.	18 September 2020	Tórsvøllur, Tórshavn, Faroe Islands	Faroe Islands	5–0	6–0	UEFA Women's Euro 2022 qualifying
4.	17 September 2021	Inver Park, Larne, Northern Ireland	Luxembourg	4–0	4–0	2023 FIFA Women's World Cup qualification
5.	26 October 2021	Seaview, Belfast, Northern Ireland	Austria	1–1	2–2	2023 FIFA Women's World Cup qualification
6.	25 November 2021	Petar Miloševski Training Centre, Skopje, North Macedonia	North Macedonia	5–0	11–0	2023 FIFA Women's World Cup qualification
7.	23 June 2022	Herman Vanderpoortenstadion, Lier, Belgium	Belgium	1–1	1–4	Friendly
8.	6 April 2023	Cardiff City Stadium, Cardiff, Wales	Wales	1–4	1–4	Friendly
9.	26 September 2023	Seaview, Belfast, Northern Ireland	Albania	1–0	1–0	2023-24 UEFA Women's Nations League
10.	23 February 2024	Podgorica City Stadium, Podgorica, Montenegro	Montenegro	1–0	2–0	2023–24 UEFA Women's Nations League play-offs
11.	9 April 2024	Bosnia and Herzegovina FA Training Centre, Zenica, Bosnia and Herzegovina	Bosnia and Herzegovina	1–0	3–1	UEFA Women's Euro 2025 qualifying
12.	4 June 2024	Mourneview Park, Lurgan, Northern Ireland	Portugal	1–0	1–2	UEFA Women's Euro 2025 qualifying
13.	16 July 2024	Windsor Park, Belfast, Northern Ireland	Bosnia and Herzegovina	2–0	2–0	UEFA Women's Euro 2025 qualifying
14.	29 October 2024	Windsor Park, Belfast, Northern Ireland	Croatia	1–0	1–0 (a.e.t.)	UEFA Women's Euro 2025 qualifying play-offs
