= Charlie Estcourt =

Welsh footballer (born 1998)

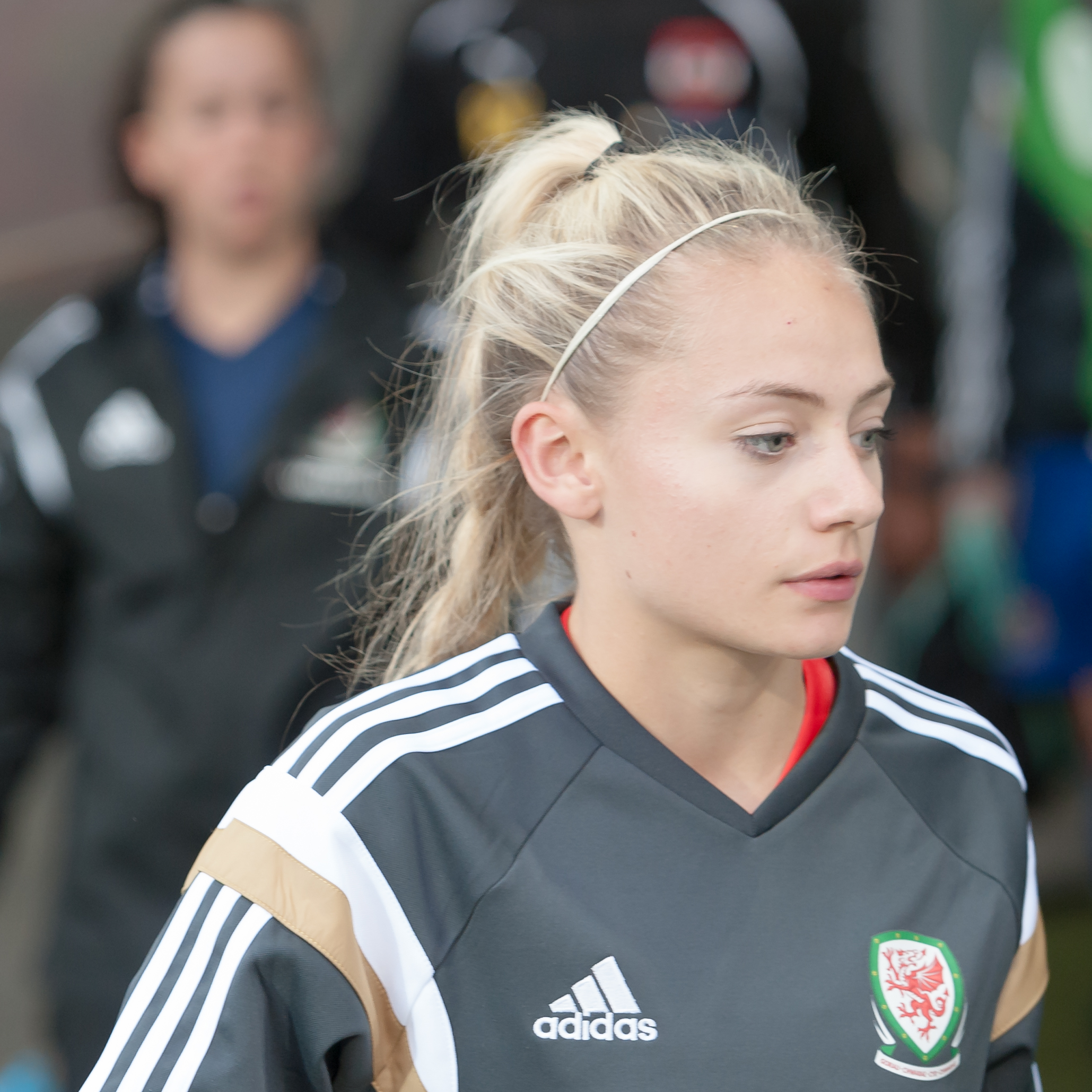
- Estcourt warming up for Wales in 2015

Personal information
- Full name: Charlotte Lucy Estcourt
- Date of birth: 27 May 1998 (age 28)
- Place of birth: Reading, Berkshire, England
- Height: 1.63 m (5 ft 4 in)
- Position: Midfielder

Team information
- Current team: Fulham
- Number: 17

Youth career
- –2011: Reading
- 2011–2015: Chelsea

Senior career*
Years	Team	Apps	(Gls)
2015–2020	Reading	17	(0)
2016	→ Bristol City (loan)	9	(2)
2017–2018	→ Bristol City (loan)	13	(0)
2019–2020	→ Charlton Athletic (loan)	11	(1)
2020–2021	London Bees	20	(2)
2021–2022	Coventry United	21	(0)
2022–2023	Birmingham City	15	(0)
2023–2024	Reading	21	(1)
2024–2025	DC Power FC	20	(0)
2026	Portsmouth	8	(0)
2026–	Fulham	0	(0)

International career^{‡}
2014–2015	Wales U17	6	(0)
2016–17	Wales U19	6	(1)
2015–	Wales	51	(3)
- * Club domestic league appearances and goals as of 2 May 2026 ‡ National team caps and goals as of 14 April 2026

Charlotte Lucy Estcourt (born 27 May 1998) is a footballer who plays as a midfielder for Fulham and the Wales national team.

== Early life ==
Born in Reading, Berkshire, Estcourt attended the John Madejski Academy, where she studied for A-levels in PE, biology and psychology.

== Club career ==
Estcourt began her career at Reading, joining the club's youth academy at the age of nine. In 2011, she left the club to join Chelsea but returned to the Royals four years later at the age of 16. At the start of the 2016 season, Estcourt joined Bristol City on a short term loan, spending three months at the club where she made 10 appearances scoring twice. When she returned to Reading, she signed her first professional contract. She then returned to Bristol on a season-long loan for the 2017–18 season. In June 2018 Estcourt signed a two-year contract with Reading keeping her at the club until the end of the 2019–20 season. On 8 June 2020, Reading announced that Estcourt had left the club after her contract had expired. In September 2022, it was confirmed Estcourt had joined Birmingham City from Coventry United.

On 28 July 2023, Estcourt was announced at Reading.

In July 2024, Estcourt was announced as a member of the inaugural roster for DC Power of the USL Super League. On 21 January 2026, the club announced the mutual termination of her contract with the club.

After a brief stint with Portsmouth, Estcourt joined Fulham on 18 July 2026. She scored two goals in her third appearance for the club in a 5–0 win over Plymouth Argyle.

== International career ==
Estcourt made her full international debut on 6 March 2015, at the age of 16, against Bosnia in the Istria Cup. During a European Qualifying match v Israel in September 2016 she scored her first international goal leading to comparisons with the goal scored by Hal Robson Kanu against Belgium in Euro 2016. She has gone on to make 48 senior appearances scoring 3 goals.

Estcourt was named Football Association of Wales (FAW) Young Player of the Year in 2015.

In June 2025, Estcourt was named in Wales' squad for UEFA Women's Euro 2025.

== Career statistics ==
=== Club ===
As of match played 2 May 2026

Appearances and goals by club, season and competition
Club	Season	League			National cup		League cup		Total	
Club	Season	Division	Apps	Goals	Apps	Goals	Apps	Goals	Apps	Goals
Reading	2015	WSL 2	3	0	1	0	5	0	9	0
Reading	2016	WSL 1	3	0	2	0	0	0	5	0
Reading	2017	WSL 1	4	0	1	0	0	0	5	0
Reading	2018–19	WSL 1	7	0	1	1	2	0	10	1
Reading	Total		17	0	5	1	7	0	29	1
Bristol City (loan)	2016	WSL 2	9	2	0	0	1	0	10	2
Bristol City (loan)	2017–18	WSL 1	13	0	1	0	2	0	16	0
Bristol City (loan)	Total		22	2	1	0	3	0	26	2
Charlton Athletic (loan)	2019–20	FA WOC	11	1	1	0	5	1	17	2
London Bees	2020–21	FA WOC	20	2	0	0	3	0	23	2
Coventry United	2021–22	FA WOC	21	0	3	0	2	1	26	1
Birmingham City	2022–23	WOC	15	0	4	0	2	0	21	0
Reading	2023–24	WOC	21	1	2	0	4	0	27	1
DC Power FC	2024–25	USLS	17	0	0	0	—		17	0
DC Power FC	2025–26	USLS	3	0	0	0	—		3	0
DC Power FC	Total		20	0	0	0	0	0	20	0
Portsmouth	2025–26	WSL 2	8	0	0	0	0	0	8	0
Career total			155	6	16	1	26	2	197	9

=== International appearances ===
As of matches played 14 May 2026. Statistics from the Football Association of Wales

Appearances and goals by national team and year
National team	Year	Apps	Goals
Wales	2015	8	0
Wales	2016	6	2
Wales	2017	8	1
Wales	2018	6	0
Wales	2019	1	0
Wales	2020	1	0
Wales	2021	5	0
Wales	2022	5	0
Wales	2023	3	0
Wales	2024	5	0
Wales	2025	5	0
Wales	2026	1	0
Total		51	3

=== International Goals ===
Scores and results list Wales's goal tally first.

#	Date	Venue	Opponent	Score	Result	Competition	Ref
1.	9 March 2016	Paralimni Stadium, Paralimni, Cyprus	Hungary	1–1	1–2	2016 Cyprus Cup	
2.	15 September 2016	Rodney Parade, Newport, Wales	Israel	3–0	3–0	Euro 2017 qualifying	
3.	1 March 2017	Paralimni Stadium, Paralimni, Cyprus	Hungary	2–0	2–0	2017 Cyprus Cup	

== Honours ==
Reading F.C. Women

- FA WSL 2: 2015:
