= Bethan Roberts =

English footballer (born 2003)

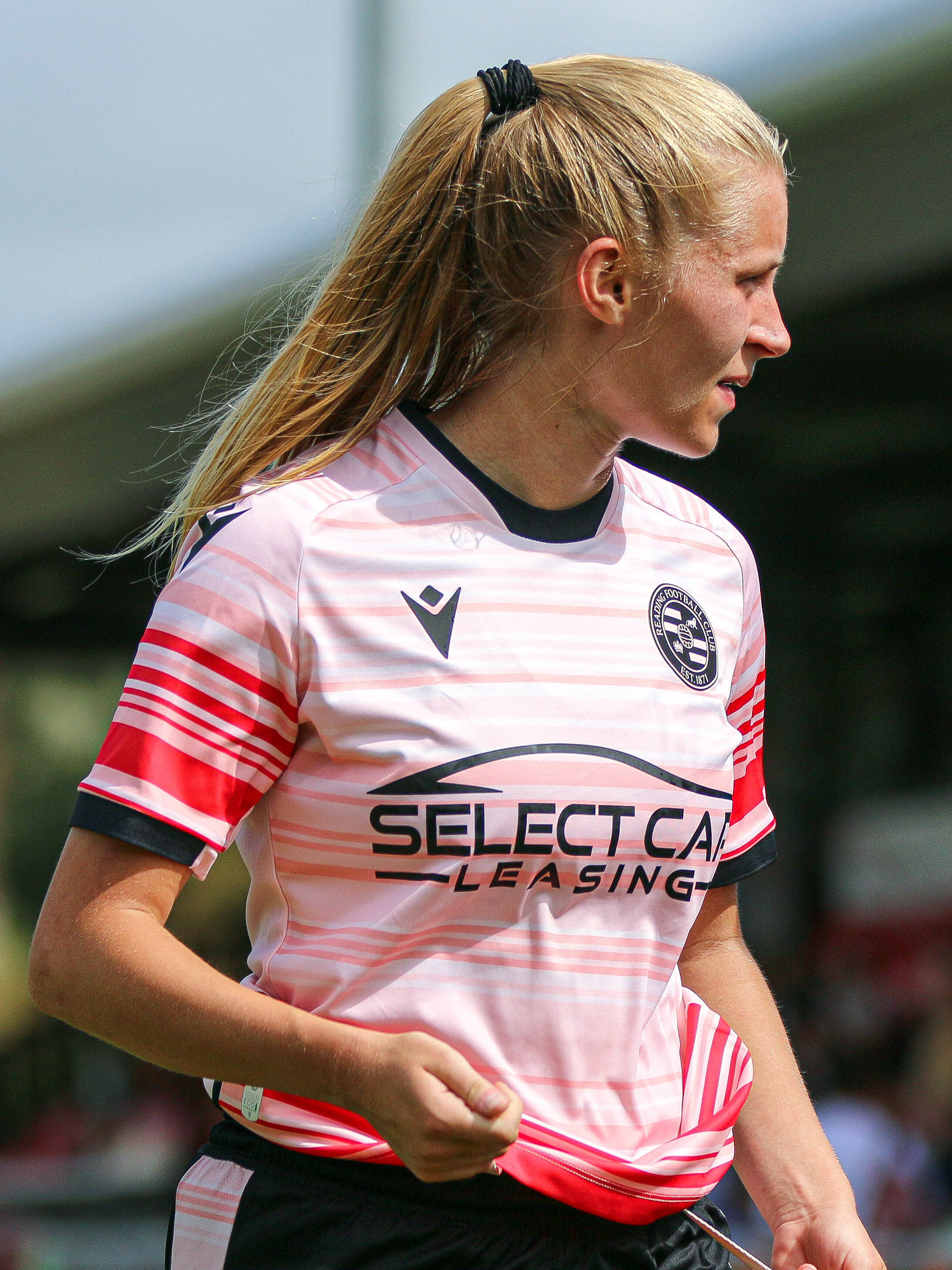
- Roberts in 2023

Personal information
- Date of birth: 14 May 2003 (age 23)
- Place of birth: Wales
- Height: 1.77 m (5 ft 10 in)
- Position: Defender

Team information
- Current team: Rugby Borough
- Number: 31

Youth career
- 2012–2020: Reading

Senior career*
Years	Team	Apps	(Gls)
2020–2024	Reading	23	(1)
2024–	Rugby Borough		

International career^{‡}
2022	Wales U19	3	(0)
- * Club domestic league appearances and goals as of 07:30, 19 July 2024 (UTC) ‡ National team caps and goals as of 07:35, 15 March 2021 (UTC)

Bethan Roberts (born 14 May 2003) is a professional footballer who plays as a defender, most recently for FA WSL club Reading.

== Club career ==
Roberts joined Reading's academy at age nine. She made her senior debut for the club on 6 December 2020, coming on in the 80th minute in a FA WSL game against Bristol City.

On 6 July 2021, Roberts signed her first professional contract with Reading, keeping her at the club until the summer of 2023.

On 2 July 2024, Reading announced the departure of Roberts after their demotion to the Southern Region Women's Football League.

== International career ==
Roberts was called up to the Wales women's national football team for the first time in April 2021.

== Career statistics ==
=== Club ===
As of match played 21 April 2024

Appearances and goals by club, season and competition
Club	Season	League			National Cup		League Cup		Continental		Other		Total	
Club	Season	Division	Apps	Goals	Apps	Goals	Apps	Goals	Apps	Goals	Apps	Goals	Apps	Goals
Reading	2020–21	FA Women's Super League	6	0	1	0	0	0	—		—		7	0
Reading	2021–22	FA Women's Super League	4	0	1	0	2	0	—		—		7	0
Reading	2022–23	FA Women's Super League	0	0	0	0	0	0	—		—		0	0
Reading	2023–24	Women's Championship	13	1	0	0	1	0	—		—		14	1
Reading	Total		23	1	2	0	3	0	-	-	-	-	28	1
Career total			23	1	2	0	3	0	-	-	-	-	28	1
