= Lulu Jarvis =

English footballer

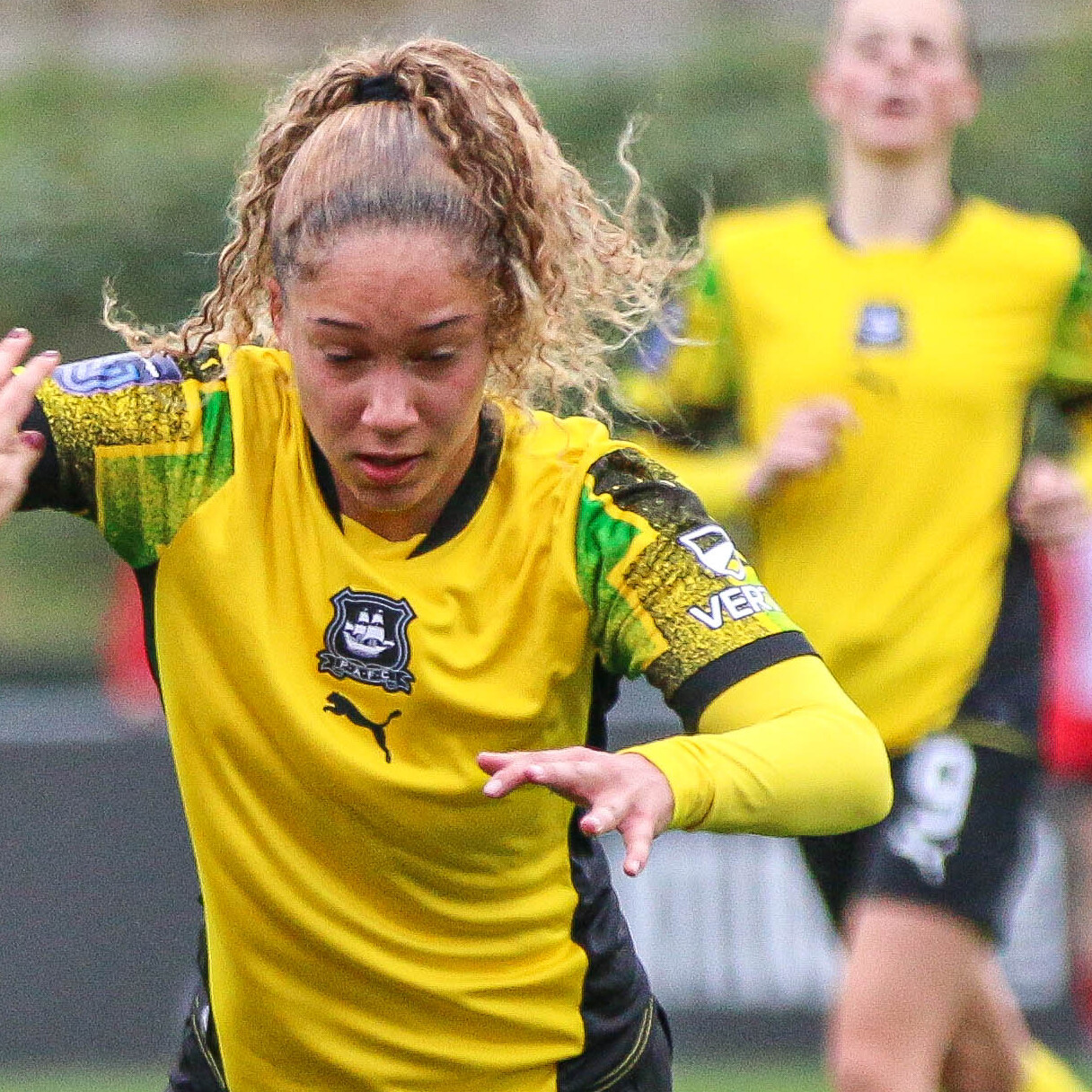
- 2024

Personal information
- Full name: Lulu Jarvis
- Date of birth: 6 May 2004 (age 22)
- Place of birth: England
- Height: 1.65 m (5 ft 5 in)
- Position: Midfielder

Team information
- Current team: Plymouth Argyle
- Number: 17

Youth career
- –2022: Brighton & Hove Albion

Senior career*
Years	Team	Apps	(Gls)
2022–2024	Brighton & Hove Albion	1	(0)
2023–2024	→ Reading (loan)	8	(0)
2024–	Plymouth Argyle	20	(2)
- * Club domestic league appearances and goals as of 2 August 2024

Lulu Jarvis is an English professional footballer who plays as a midfielder for Plymouth Argyle in the FA Women's National League South. She previously played for Women's Super League club Brighton & Hove Albion.

== Club career ==
=== Brighton & Hove Albion ===
After rising through the Brighton Academy, Jarvis made her first senior appearance on 30 October 2022 against Tottenham Hotspur in the 8–0 home defeat. Jarvis signed a one-and-a-half-year professional contract with Brighton in December 2022.

On 5 June 2024, Brighton reported that Jarvis, and three other players, would leave when their contracts expire in June.

==== Loan to Reading ====
On 14 September 2023, Jarvis signed for Reading on loan for the 2023–24 season. On 17 September 2023, Jarvis made her first Reading appearance coming on as a substitute in the home defeat to Southampton.

=== Plymouth Argyle ===
On 2 August 2024, Jarvis joined Plymouth Argyle WFC as a permanent signing after trialling with the club for several weeks. On 21 August 2025, Jarvis picked up a serious injury, fracturing her tibia and fibula, during a match against Marine Academy Plymouth.

== Career statistics ==
=== Club ===
As of 31 March 2024.

Appearances and goals by club, season and competition
Club	Season	League			FA Cup		League Cup		Total	
Club	Season	Division	Apps	Goals	Apps	Goals	Apps	Goals	Apps	Goals
Brighton & Hove Albion	2022–23	WSL	1	0	1	0	0	0	2	0
Reading (loan)	2023–24	Women's Championship	8	0	1	0	4	0	13	0
Plymouth Argyle	2024–25	FA Women's National League South	19	2	5	1	3	0	27	3
Plymouth Argyle	2025–26	FA Women's National League South	1	0	0	0	1	1	2	1
Plymouth Argyle	Total		20	2	5	1	4	1	29	4
Career total			29	2	7	1	8	1	44	4
