= Tia Primmer =

English footballer

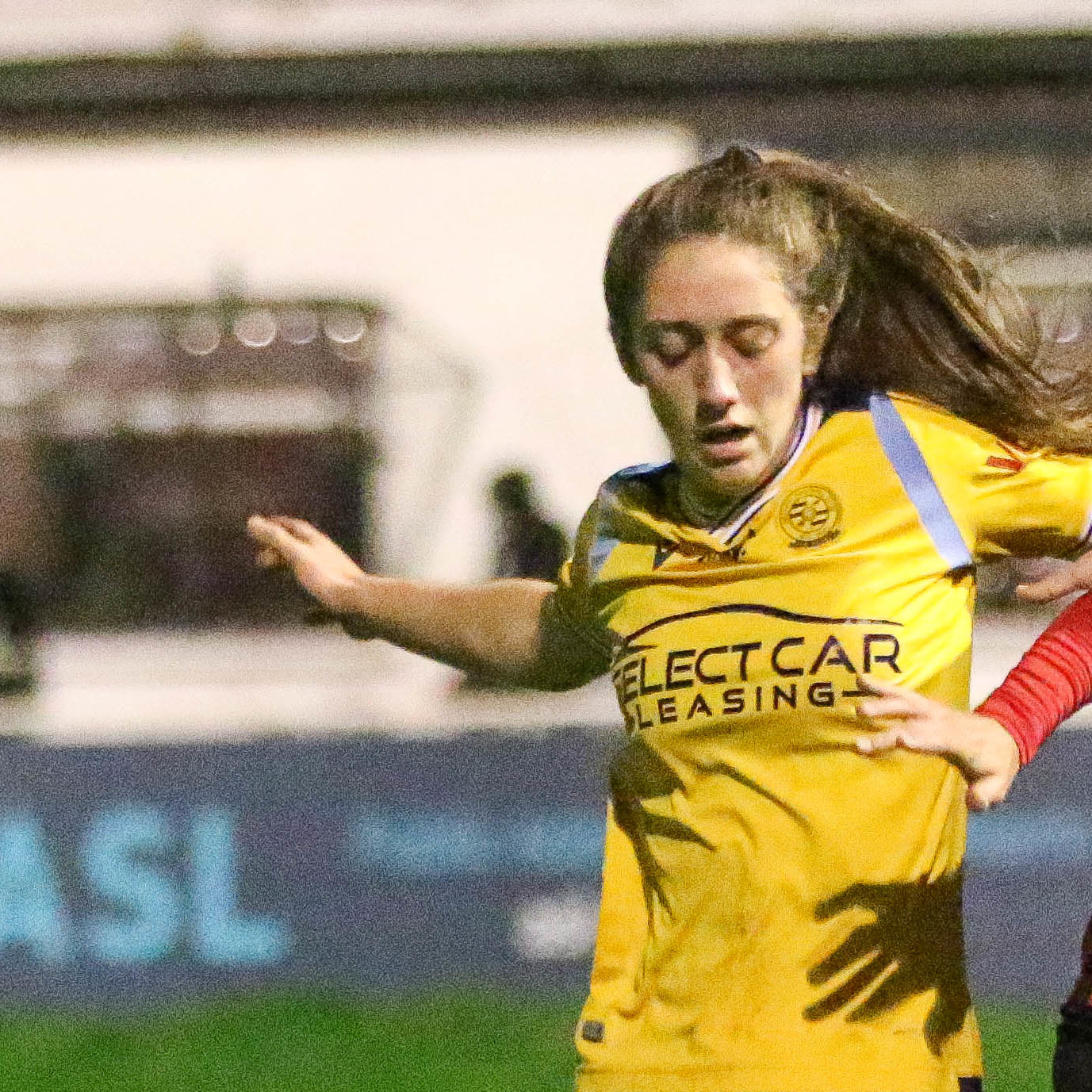
- in 2021

Personal information
- Full name: Tia-Jade Primmer
- Date of birth: 2 May 2004 (age 22)
- Place of birth: England
- Position: Midfielder

Team information
- Current team: Glasgow City
- Number: 22

Youth career
- –2021: Reading

Senior career*
Years	Team	Apps	(Gls)
2021–2024	Reading	42	(4)
2024–2025	Blackburn Rovers	4	(0)
2025–2026	Portsmouth	0	(0)
2026–	Glasgow City	0	(0)
- * Club domestic league appearances and goals as of 10:40, 28 January 2025 (UTC)

Tia-Jade Primmer (born 2 May 2004) is an English professional footballer who plays as a midfielder for Scottish Women's Premier League club Glasgow City.

== Club career ==
Primmer made her debut for Reading on 7 November 2021, against Birmingham City in the Women's Super League. On 30 January 2022, Primmer scored her first goal for Reading, the winner in their 3–2 victory over Brighton & Hove Albion in the Women's FA Cup. A week later, 6 February 2022, Primmer scored her first Women's Super League goal, scoring an 87th-minute winner for Reading against Everton.

On 7 July 2022, Primmer signed her first professional contract with Reading, until the summer of 2024. On 2 July 2024, Reading announced the departure of Primmer after their demotion to the Southern Region Women's Football League.

On 11 October 2024, Blackburn Rovers announced the signing of Primmer.

On 18 July 2025, it was announced that Primmer had signed a one-year contract, with the potential for a further 12-month extension, with WSL 2 side Portsmouth.

On 11 July 2026, Primmer joined Scottish Women's Premier League club Glasgow City on a three-year deal.

== Career statistics ==
=== Club ===
As of match played 25 January 2025

Appearances and goals by club, season and competition
Club	Season	League			National Cup		League Cup		Total	
Club	Season	Division	Apps	Goals	Apps	Goals	Apps	Goals	Apps	Goals
Reading	2021–22	FA Women's Super League	10	1	2	1	2	0	14	2
Reading	2022–23	FA Women's Super League	17	1	1	0	3	0	21	1
Reading	2023–24	Women's Championship	15	2	2	0	4	0	21	2
Reading	Total		42	4	5	1	9	0	56	5
Blackburn Rovers	2024–25	Women's Championship	4	0	1	0	1	0	6	0
Career total			46	4	6	1	10	0	62	5
