= Rachel Dugdale =

Northern Ireland footballer (born 1996)

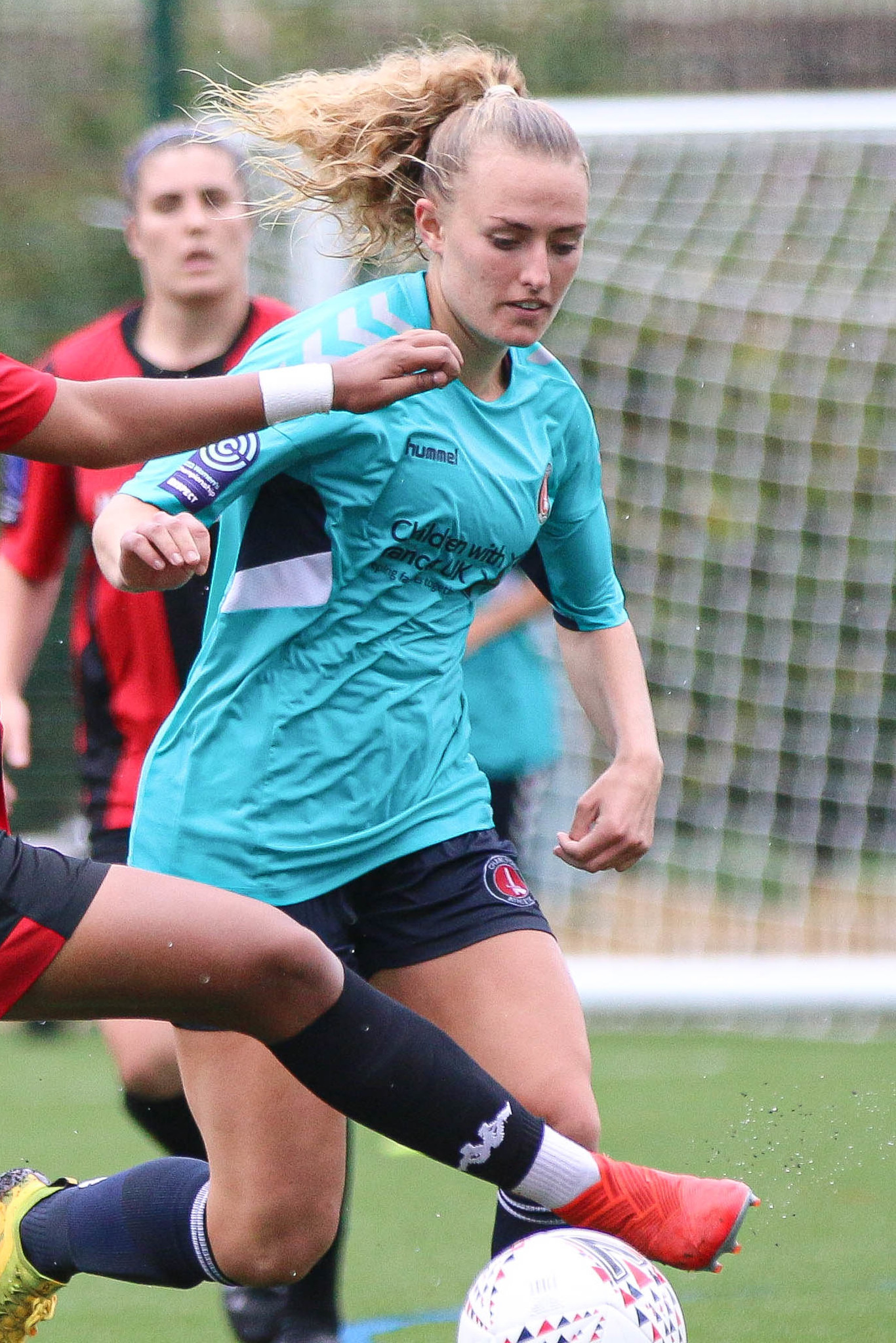
- Dugdale in 2020

Personal information
- Full name: Rachel Dugdale
- Date of birth: 19 November 1996 (age 29)
- Place of birth: Reading, Berkshire, England
- Position: Defender

Team information
- Current team: Blackburn Rovers
- Number: 12

Youth career
- Reading

College career
Years	Team	Apps	(Gls)
2018	Boston College	15	(0)

Senior career*
Years	Team	Apps	(Gls)
2016–2018	Doncaster Rovers Belles	18	(0)
2019–2023	Charlton Athletic	30	(1)
2023	Coventry United	8	(0)
2023–2024	Reading	21	(0)
2024–2025	Blackburn Rovers	6	(0)

International career^{‡}
2016–2025	Northern Ireland	43	(0)
- * Club domestic league appearances and goals as of 23:19, 23 October 2024 (UTC) ‡ National team caps and goals as of 00:00, 16 September 2025(UTC)

Rachel Dugdale (née Newborough; born 19 November 1996) is a Northern Irish former footballer who played as a defender for the Northern Ireland women's national team and various clubs in England and the USA.

== Club career ==
=== Doncaster Rovers Belles ===
Newborough made her debut for Doncaster Rovers Belles in 2017 when she was still a teenager. During her time with them, she helped them win the FA WSL 2 championship before moving to the United States for university and playing for Boston College Eagles Women.

=== Charlton Athletic ===
In July 2019, Newborough joined FA Women's Championship club Charlton Athletic. Two years later, she signed a professional contract with the club. In 2022, she suffered an anterior cruciate ligament injury that kept her out of Northern Ireland's squad for the Women's European Championship that year.

=== Coventry United ===
In January 2023, Newborough joined Coventry United on a free transfer after she departed Charlton Athletic by mutual consent.

=== Reading ===
On 25 August 2023, Reading announced the signing of Dugdale, who'd previously been at the club at youth level. Due to Reading withdrawing from the Women's Championship in 2024, Dugdale opted to leave the club after making 22 appearances.

=== Blackburn Rovers ===
On 4 September 2024, Dugdale was announced to have signed a contract Blackburn Rovers after moving from Reading on a free transfer.

== International career ==
Dugdale has been capped 43 times for the Northern Ireland national team, appearing for the team during the 2019 FIFA Women's World Cup qualifying cycle.

== Retirement ==
Dugdale announced her retirement from professional football on 15 September 2025.

== Personal life ==
Newborough studied philosophy, politics and economics at Boston College and has a masters degree in business. During her ACL injury, she founded her own marketing company. Newborough married her partner, Guy Dugdale, on 13 May 2023.

== Career statistics ==
As of match played 28 April 2024

Appearances and goals by club, season and competition
Club	Season	League			National Cup		League Cup		Continental		Other		Total	
Club	Season	Division	Apps	Goals	Apps	Goals	Apps	Goals	Apps	Goals	Apps	Goals	Apps	Goals
Reading	2023–24	Women's Championship	21	0	2	0	0	0	—		—		23	0
Career total			21	0	2	0	0	0	-	-	-	-	23	0
