= Keira Flannery =

English footballer (born 2005)

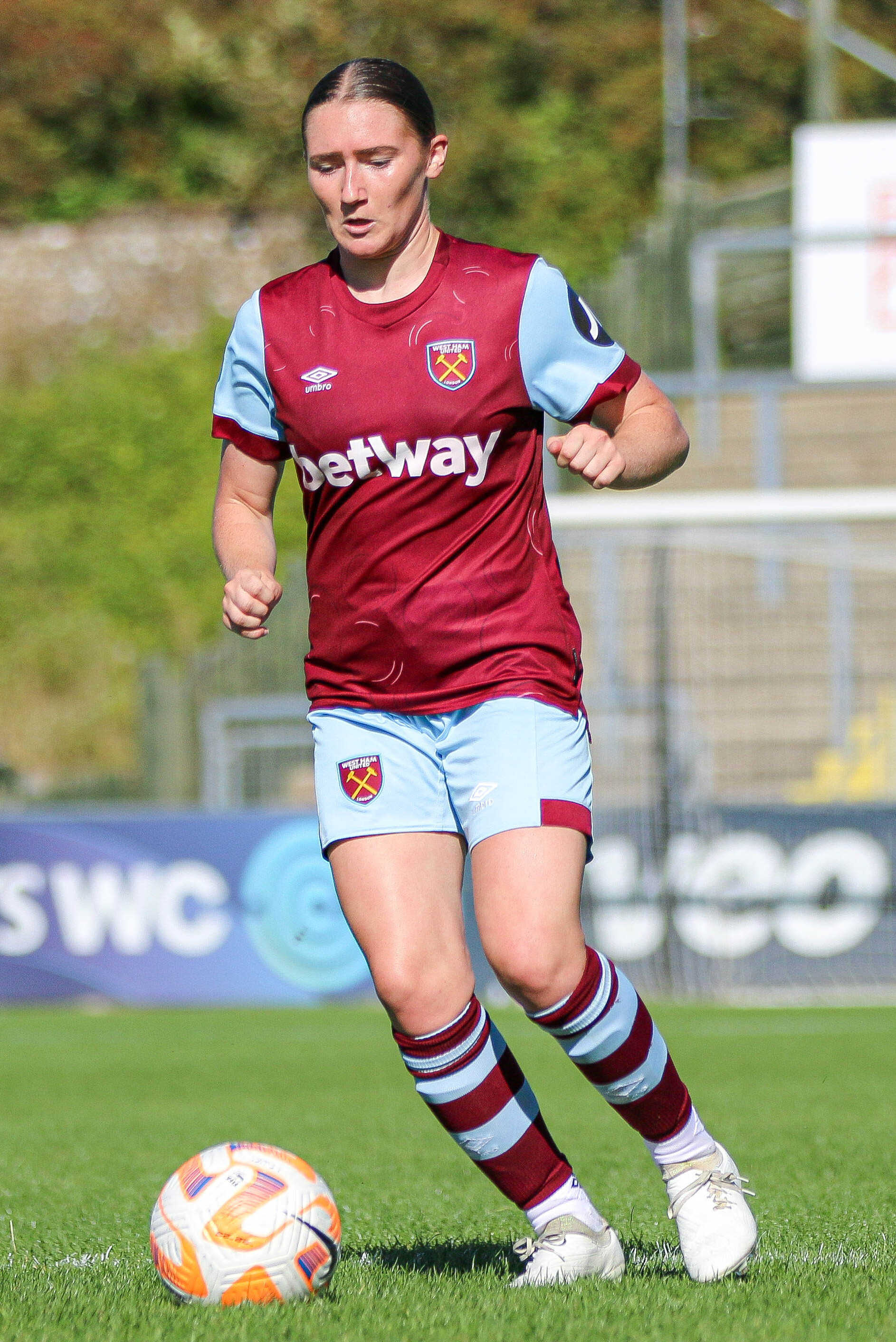
- Flannery playing for West Ham in 2023

Personal information
- Full name: Keira Shirley Ann Flannery
- Date of birth: 24 September 2005 (age 21)
- Place of birth: England
- Height: 1.60 m (5 ft 3 in)
- Position: Central midfielder

Team information
- Current team: Charlton Athletic
- Number: 14

Youth career
- Arsenal
- West Ham United

Senior career*
Years	Team	Apps	(Gls)
2022–2026	West Ham United	5	(0)
2023	→ Gillingham (loan)		
2023–2024	→ Reading (loan)	10	(1)
2024–2025	→ Sunderland (loan)	3	(0)
2025–2026	→ Charlton Athletic (loan)	22	(0)
2026–	Charlton Athletic	0	(0)

International career^{‡}
2021–2022	England U17	5	(0)
2022	England U18	1	(1)
2023	England U19	3	(0)
- * Club domestic league appearances and goals as of 18:43, 18 August 2026 (UTC) ‡ National team caps and goals as of 23:18, 1 December, 2023

Keira Shirley Ann Flannery (born 24 September 2005) is an English women's footballer who plays as a central midfielder for Women's Super League club Charlton Athletic. She has represented England at under-17, under-18 and under-19 youth levels.

== Club career ==
=== West Ham United ===
Flannery spent several years with Arsenal Women's youth team. Flannery joined West Ham on 22 July 2022 at age 16 feeling there was more opportunity for first-team football. West Ham were also the club she had supported all her life having once walked out with West Ham captain, Kevin Nolan as a mascot before a game at Upton Park. She chose squad number 41, the same as her idol, Declan Rice.

Flannery made her Women's Super League debut for West Ham on 28 September 2022 against Chelsea coming on as an 87th-minute substitute for Lisa Evans in a 3–1 defeat.

On 29 January 2023, she provided an assist in the 2–0 win over Wolverhampton Wanderers in the 2022–23 FA Cup, impressing in the West Ham side and being named Player of the Match.

==== Loan to Gillingham ====
In February 2023, Flannery joined National League South side Gillingham on loan for the remainder of the 2022–23 season.

==== Loan to Reading ====
On 31 January 2024, she joined Championship side Reading on loan for the remainder of the 2023–24 season, making her debut on 4 February in a 1–0 win over Sunderland.

=== Charlton Athletic ===
On 4 September 2025, Flannery joined Women's Super League 2 club Charlton Athletic on a season-long loan. In June 2026, Charlton confirmed that Flannery would return to parent club West Ham following the conclusion of her loan.

On 24 August 2026, Flannery signed a permanent three year deal with Charlton, which was the longest contract ever given to a Charlton Athletic Women's player.

== International career ==
In October 2021, Flannery was named in the England under-17 squad for 2022 U-17 Championship qualification fixtures, captaining the team in their opening match defeat against Russia. She played in the remaining first round matches against Poland and Belgium, setting up the winning goal in the latter to help England reach the second round of qualification. In March 2022, Flannery featured as part of the starting eleven in the qualification matches against France and Poland.

On 9 November 2022, with England U18, she scored the only goal in the 5–1 defeat to Portugal.

Flannery was named as part of the England U19 squad for Algarve Cup fixtures, playing in matches against Portugal, Sweden and the Netherlands in November and December 2023.

== Career statistics ==
As of match played 28 April 2024

Appearances and goals by club, season and competition
Club	Season	League			National Cup		League Cup		Continental		Other		Total	
Club	Season	Division	Apps	Goals	Apps	Goals	Apps	Goals	Apps	Goals	Apps	Goals	Apps	Goals
Reading	2023–24	Women's Championship	10	1	0	0	0	0	—		—		10	1
Career total			10	1	0	0	0	0	-	-	-	-	10	1
