= Halle Houssein =

Turkish footballer

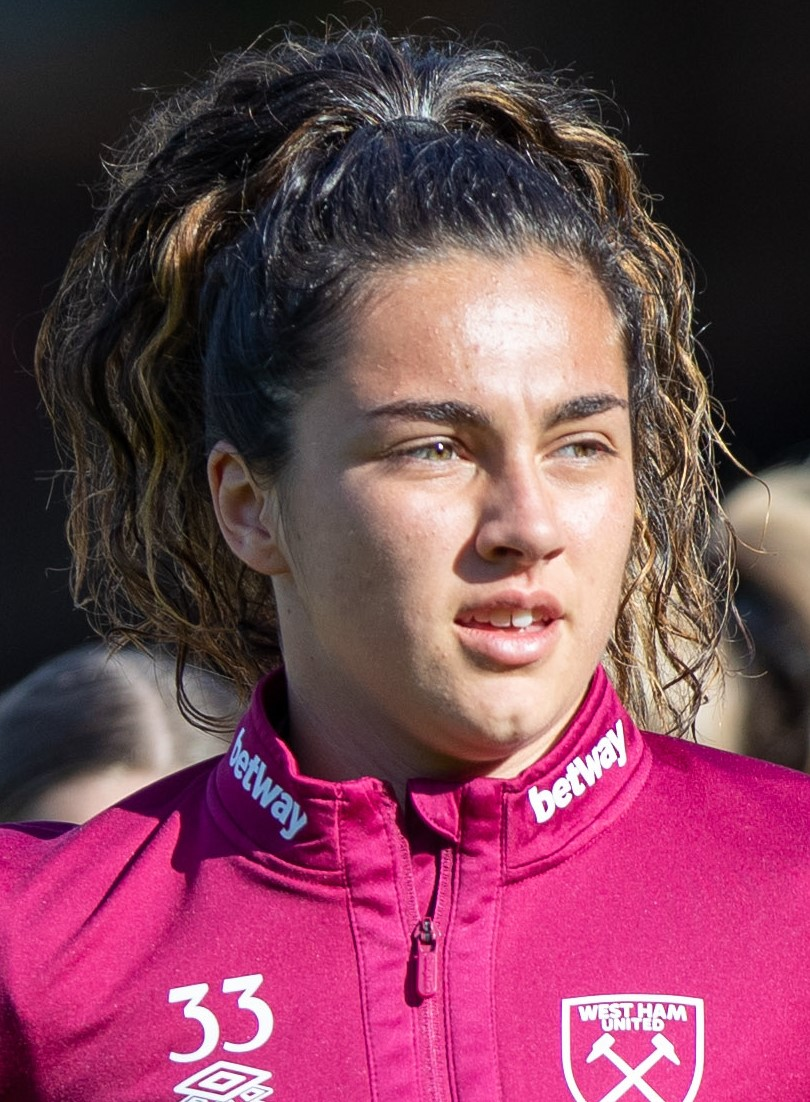
- Houssein with West Ham United in 2022

Personal information
- Full name: Halle Rose Pembe Houssein Şensizoğlu
- Date of birth: 11 December 2004 (age 21)
- Place of birth: Waltham Forest, London, England
- Position: Midfielder

Team information
- Current team: Sheffield United (on loan from West Ham United)

Youth career
- –2021: Arsenal

Senior career*
Years	Team	Apps	(Gls)
2021–2022	Arsenal	1	(0)
2022–	West Ham United	10	(0)
2023–2024	→ Reading (loan)	13	(0)
2026–	→ Sheffield United (loan)	0	(0)

International career^{‡}
2019	England U15	1	(0)
2021	England U19	2	(0)
2024–	Turkey	2	(0)
- * Club domestic league appearances and goals as of 20 November 2022 (UTC) ‡ National team caps and goals as of 16 July 2024 (UTC)

Halle Rose Pembe Houssein Şensizoğlu (Turkish: [haˈlle ˈroze ˈpembe husˈsejn ʃen.siˈzoː.ɫu]; born 11 December 2004) is a professional footballer who plays as a midfielder for Women's Super League 2 club Sheffield United, on loan from West Ham United. Born in England, she represented her country of birth up to under-19 level before making her senior international debut for Turkey in 2024.

== Club career ==
Houssein started her career with Arsenal. On 12 September 2021, she debuted for Arsenal during a 4–0 win over Reading. Before the second half of 2021–22, Houssein signed for West Ham United in England.

On 7 September 2023, Reading announced the season-long loan signing of Houssein from West Ham United.

On 26 August 2026, Houssein signed a season-long loan deal for Women's Super League 2 side Sheffield United.

== International career ==
Şensizoğlu debuted in the Turkey women's national football team playing at the UEFA Women's Euro 2025 qualifying League B match against Switzerland on 12 July 2024.

== Personal life ==
Halle Rose Pembe Şensizoğlu, shortly Halle Houssein, was born in Waltham Forest, London, England on 11 December 2004. She was born to a Cypriot-Turkish father. She lives in London.

== Career statistics ==
As of match played 28 March 2024

Appearances and goals by club, season and competition
Club	Season	League			National Cup		League Cup		Continental		Other		Total	
Club	Season	Division	Apps	Goals	Apps	Goals	Apps	Goals	Apps	Goals	Apps	Goals	Apps	Goals
Reading	2023–24	Women's Championship	13	0	2	0	4	0	—		—		19	0
Career total			13	0	2	0	4	0	-	-	-	-	19	0
