= Emily Orman =

English footballer (born 2002)

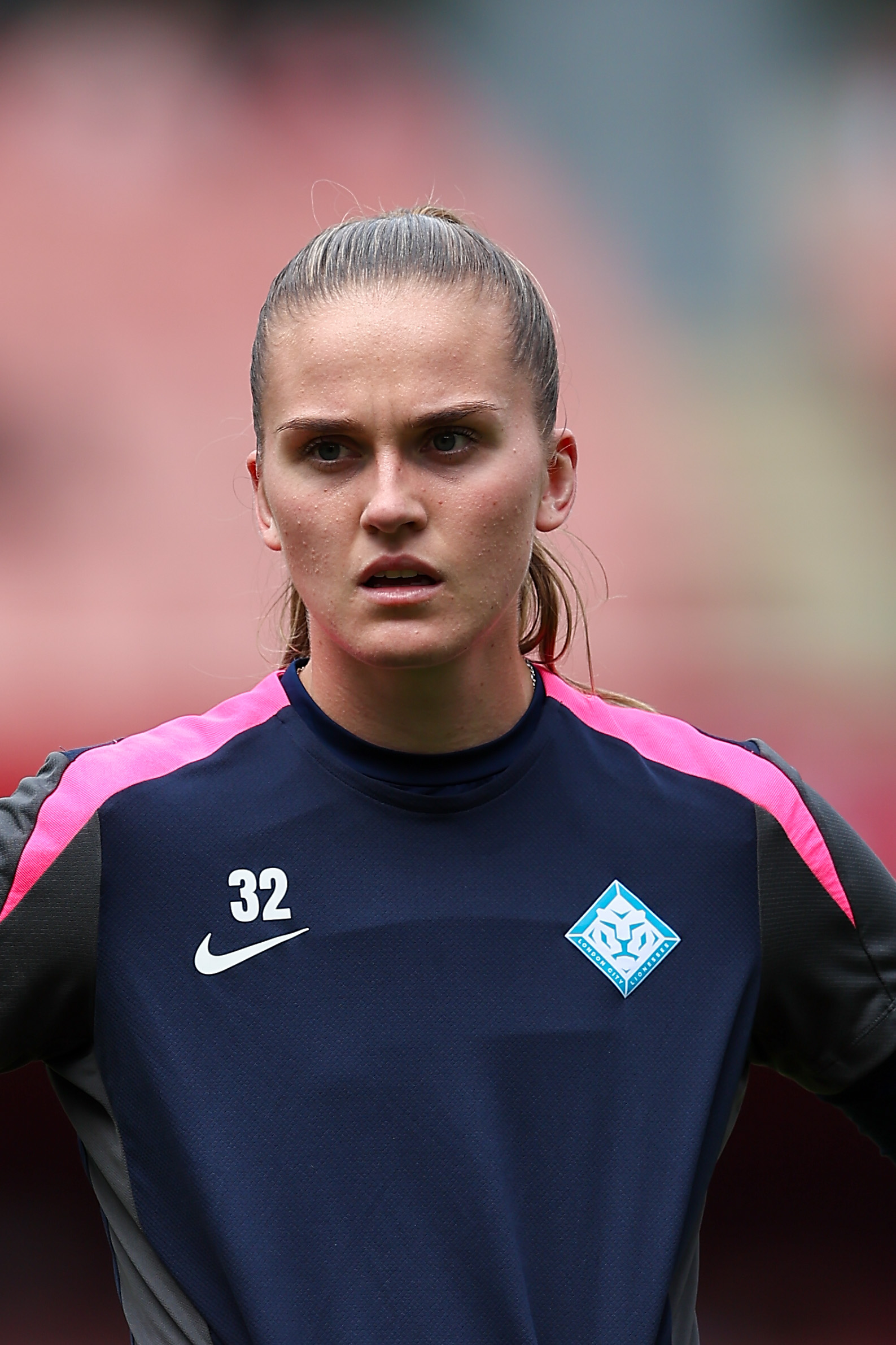
- Emily Orman 2025

Personal information
- Full name: Emily Kathleen Orman
- Date of birth: 5 November 2002 (age 23)
- Place of birth: Redhill, Surrey, England
- Height: 1.82 m (6 ft 0 in)
- Position: Goalkeeper

Team information
- Current team: Wolverhampton Wanderers

Senior career*
Years	Team	Apps	(Gls)
2019–2024	Chelsea	0	(0)
2021–2022	→ Crystal Palace (loan)		
2023–2024	→ Reading (loan)	17	(0)
2024–	London City Lionesses	18	(0)
2026–	→ Wolverhampton Wanderers (loan)	0	(0)

International career^{‡}
2019	England U17	3	(0)
- England U19
2024–	England U23	1	(0)
- * Club domestic league appearances and goals as of 17:44, 23 March 2026 (UTC) ‡ National team caps and goals as of 17:44, 23 March 2026 (UTC)

Emily Kathleen Orman (born 5 November 2002) is an English professional footballer who plays as a goalkeeper for Women's Super League 2 team Wolverhampton Wanderers, on loan from Women's Super League club London City Lionesses.

A product of the Chelsea F.C. Women academy, which she joined at age 16, Orman signed her first professional contract with the club in 2021 and had loan spells at Crystal Palace F.C. Women and Reading F.C. Women before joining London City Lionesses in 2024. She made 21 appearances for the club during their 2024–25 season, which ended in promotion to the Women's Super League, and was named Women's Championship Golden Glove winner. Orman has represented England at under-17, under-19, and under-23 level.

== Club career ==
=== Chelsea ===
Orman joined the Chelsea academy at the age of 16 and signed her first professional contract with the club in 2021. She was part of the Chelsea squad that won the Women's Super League title in the 2022–23 season.

=== Loan spells ===
During her time at Chelsea, Orman spent loan spells at Crystal Palace in the 2021–22 season and at Reading in the 2023–24 season.

=== London City Lionesses ===
In 2024, Orman signed for London City Lionesses. She made 21 appearances during the season, including 18 in the Women's Championship, as the club achieved promotion to the Women's Super League. She was awarded the Barclays Women's Championship Golden Glove at the 2025 Women's Professional Game Awards.

Orman sustained a wrist injury in training in September 2025, which ruled her out of match action for part of the season. This led to Sophia Poor, who was on loan from LCL to Nottingham Forest W.F.C., being recalled to the club. During this period, she made media appearances, including co-commentary on WSL games for Sky Sports, and analysis on BBC's "The Women's Football Show."

=== Loan to Wolverhampton Wanderers, 2026–present ===
On 21 July 2026, it was announced that Orman would be joining newly-promoted Women's Super League 2 team Wolverhampton Wanderers on a season-long loan.

== International career ==
Orman has represented England at youth level, including at under-17 level during the 2019 UEFA Women's Under-17 Championship. She has also represented England in the under-19 and under-23 teams, replacing an injured Kayla Rendell in the U23 squad.

== Honours ==
=== Chelsea ===
- Women's Super League and FA Cup winners’ medal: 2022–23 Chelsea F.C. Women season

=== London City Lionesses ===
- Women's Championship: 2024–25
- Women's Championship Golden Glove (Individual): 2024–25
