= Easther Mayi Kith =

Cameroonian footballer (born 1997)

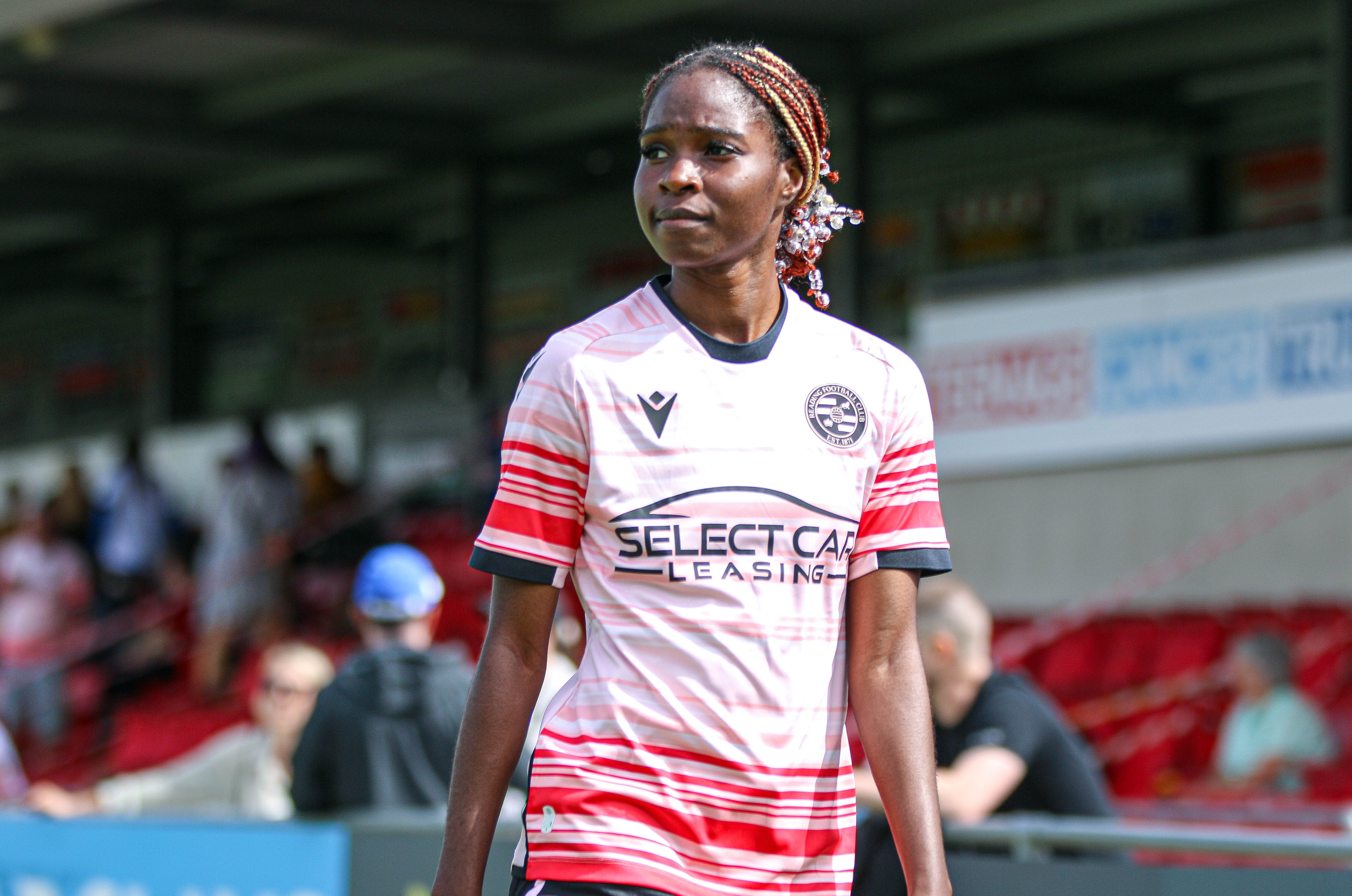
- Mayi Kith with Reading in 2023

Personal information
- Full name: Easther Kellsy Philomene Mayi Kith
- Date of birth: 28 March 1997 (age 29)
- Place of birth: Quebec City, Quebec, Canada
- Height: 1.72 m (5 ft 8 in)
- Position: Centre-back

Team information
- Current team: Urawa Red Diamonds
- Number: 2

Youth career
- Royal-Sélect de Beauport
- AS Laser de Joliette

College career
Years	Team	Apps	(Gls)
2015–2018	West Virginia Mountaineers	93	(0)

Senior career*
Years	Team	Apps	(Gls)
2014	Quebec Dynamo ARSQ		
2018	Dynamo de Quebec	2	(0)
2019–2020	Montpellier	2	(0)
2020	Metz	4	(0)
2020–2022	Reims	35	(0)
2022	Kristianstads	9	(0)
2023–2024	Reading	8	(0)
2024–2025	Saint-Étienne	20	(0)
2025–	Urawa Red Diamonds	12	(0)

International career^{‡}
2013–2014	Canada U-17	7	(0)
2019–	Cameroon	4	(0)
Medal record
Women's Africa Cup of Nations
Gold medal – first place	2026 Morocco
- * Club domestic league appearances and goals as of 23 July 2026 ‡ National team caps and goals as of 8 April 2025

Easther Kellsy Philomene Mayi Kith (born 28 March 1997) is a professional footballer who plays as a centre-back for WE League club Urawa Red Diamonds. Born in Canada to Cameroonian parents, she plays for Cameroon women's national team.

== Early life ==
She began playing soccer at age seven with Royal-Sélect de Beauport.

== College career ==
Mayi Kith attended West Virginia University in the United States, where she made 93 appearances for the West Virginia Mountaineers women's soccer team. Her first and only collegiate career assist was on an equalizing goal in the 2016 NCAA Division I women's soccer tournament championship match, and she scored in a penalty shoot-out to help West Virginia advance in the 2017 NCAA Division I women's soccer tournament round of 16.

== Club career ==
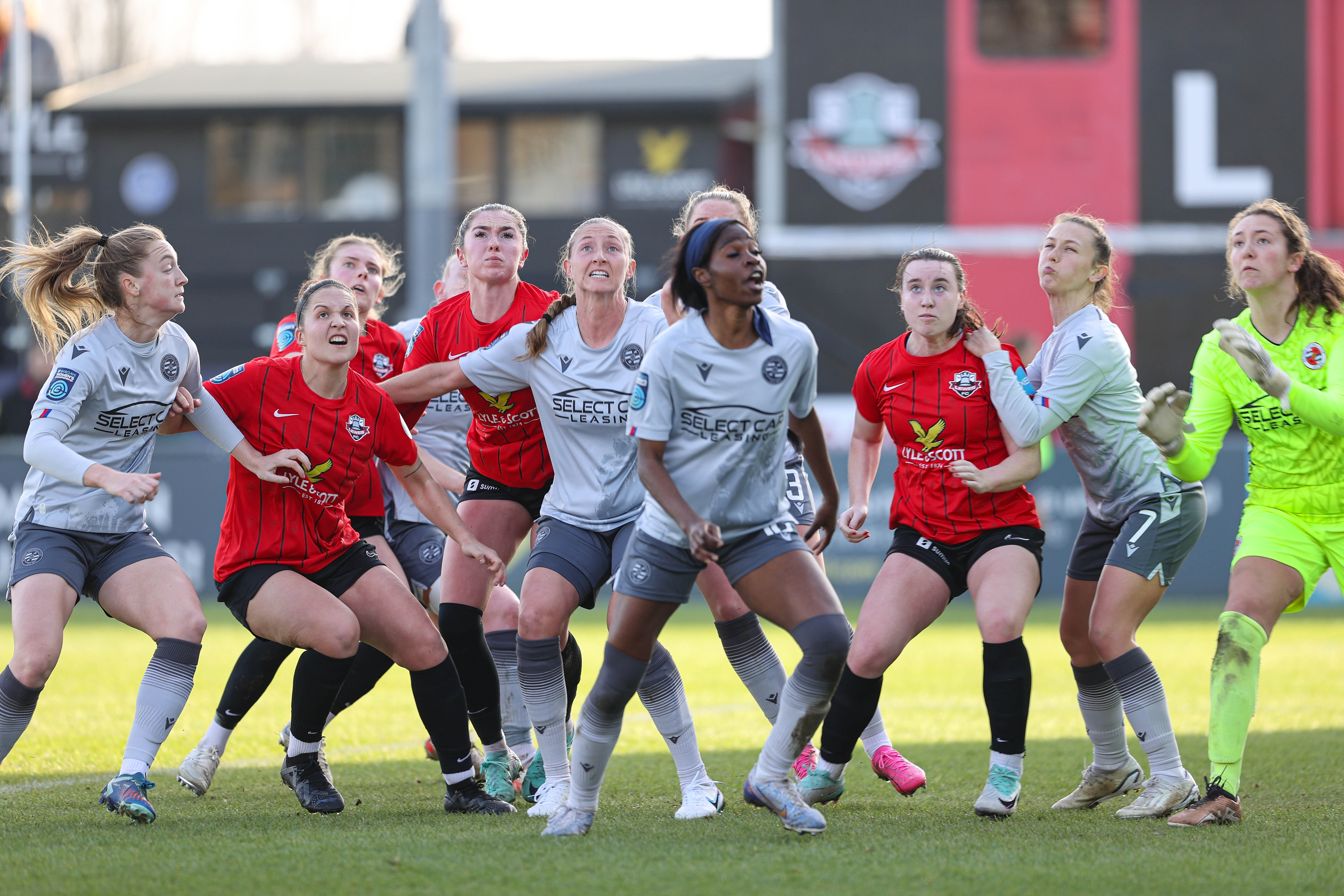
playing against Lewes in 2024

During her college career, Mayi Kith played for Dynamo de Quebec. After that, she joined French club Montpellier HSC on 2 January 2019. She also played for French clubs Metz and Reims before moving to Kristianstads DFF of the Swedish Damallsvenskan in 2022 and making nine appearances there. On 31 January 2023, she signed an 18-month contract with WSL club Reading. On 2 July 2024, Mayi Kith was one of the players released by Reading following their voluntary demotion to the fifth tier Southern Region Women's Football League. On 19 July 2024, she returned to France to sign with Première Ligue club Saint-Étienne.

== International career ==
Quebec-born Mayi Kith represented Canada at the 2013 CONCACAF Women's U-17 Championship and the 2014 FIFA U-17 Women's World Cup. Daughter of Cameroonians, she made the one-time switch to Cameroon in order to play for its women's national team at the 2019 FIFA Women's World Cup. She made her senior debut prior to the competition, on 17 May 2019 in a 0–4 friendly loss to Spain.

== Career statistics ==
As of match played 12 April 2025

Appearances and goals by club, season and competition
Club	Season	League			National Cup		League Cup		Continental		Other		Total	
Club	Season	Division	Apps	Goals	Apps	Goals	Apps	Goals	Apps	Goals	Apps	Goals	Apps	Goals
Kristianstads	2022	Damallsvenskan	9	0	1	0	—		2	0	—		12	0
Reading	2022–23	FA Women's Super League	8	0	2	0	0	0	—		—		10	0
Reading	2023–24	Women's Championship	19	0	2	0	4	0	—		—		25	0
Reading	Total		27	0	4	0	4	0	-	-	-	-	35	0
AS Saint-Étienne	2024–25	Première Ligue	20	0	3	0	—		—		—		23	0
Career total			56	0	8	0	4	0	2	0	-	-	70	0

=== International ===
As of match played 8 April 2025.

Appearances and goals by national team and year
National team	Year	Apps	Goals
Cameroon	2019	1	0
Cameroon	2021	1	0
Cameroon	2022	1	0
Cameroon	2025	1	0
Total		4	0

== Honours ==
Cameroon

- Women's Africa Cup of Nations: 2026
