= Plymouth Argyle W.F.C. =

Coordinates: 50°21′45.99″N 4°04′00.93″W

Plymouth Argyle
- Full name: Plymouth Argyle Women Football Club
- Nicknames: The Pilgrims; The Greens
- Founded: 1975; 51 years ago (as Plymouth Pilgrims); 2001; 25 years ago (became Plymouth Argyle)
- Ground: Foulston Park (from 2026-27 season); Manadon Sports Hub; Home Park
- Executive Lead: Christian Kent
- Manager: Vacant
- League: FA Women's National League South
- 2025–26: FA Women's National League South, 2nd of 12
- Website: pafc.co.uk
Home colours	Away colours	Third colours

Plymouth Argyle Women Football Club are a women's football club based in the city of Plymouth, Devon, England. They compete in the FA Women's National League South.

Founded in 1975, they come under the bracket of Plymouth Argyle F.C., and play their home games at Manadon Sports Hub, Plymouth, which is owned and operated by the PAFC Community Trust.

== History ==
=== Formation and early years (1975–2010) ===
The club was formed in 1975 as a result of a 5-a-side league at the Mayflower Leisure Centre. Two teams merged in order to enter an 11-a-side football tournament in Newquay, Cornwall with the team creating the name of 'Plymouth Pilgrims'. Following the success of the tournament, Plymouth Pilgrims played in numerous competitions throughout the 1970s and 1980s with the most notable achievement being reaching the quarter-finals of the FA Cup in both 1976 and 1977.

The club name changed to 'Saltash Pilgrims' in the late 1990s and the early part of the year 2000 to reflect their home ground at the time – Saltash United's Kimberly Stadium in Cornwall. It was not until the 2001–02 season that the club, then competing in the South West Combination, were invited to compete under the umbrella of Plymouth Argyle F.C., and Plymouth Argyle Ladies were formed.

Plymouth won the 2010–11 South West Combination, and were promoted to the Southern Division, but faced relegation at the end of the 2011–12 season.

=== National League and Affiliation (2010–present) ===
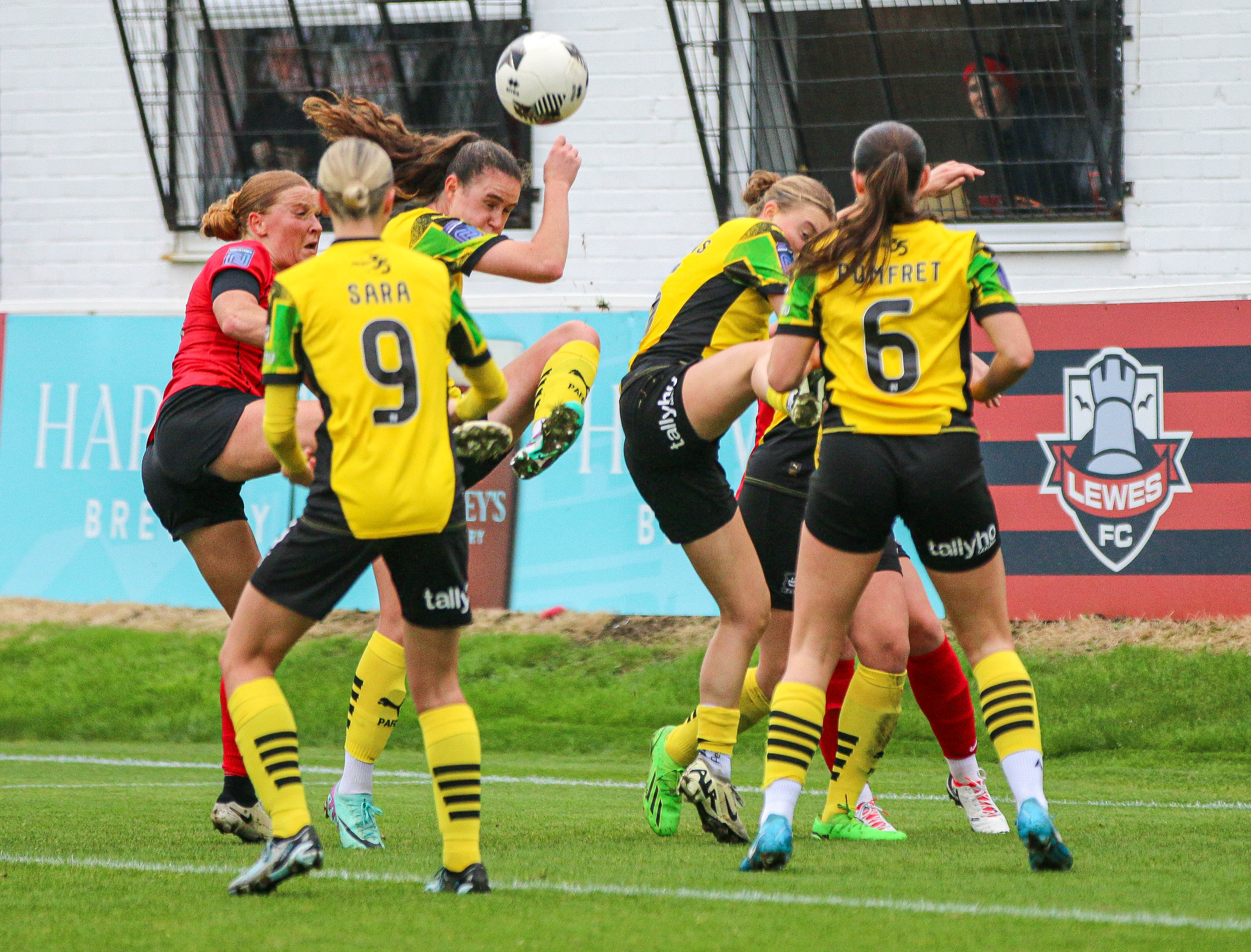
Versus Lewes in October 2024

In August 2020, Ryan Perks was appointed manager. A year later, ahead of the 2021–22 season, the club changed name, replacing the suffix Ladies Football Club with Women Football Club, as the club transferred from under the management of the Argyle Community Trust, to being taken under the professional wing of Plymouth Argyle.

The team officially became part of Plymouth Argyle Football Club on 1 July 2024 and on the same day, the young goal-scorer Ellie Sara became the first woman to sign for the newly organised Plymouth Argyle Women.

== Sponsorship ==
Since the 2017–18 season, Plymouth's kits have been sponsored by the main club sponsor, such as Cornwall-based company Ginsters until 2022.

Period	Brand	Shirt Sponsor
2017–2022	Puma	Ginsters
2022–2023	Puma	Project 35
2023–2024	Puma	WH Bond Timber
2024–2025	Puma	Classic Builders (SW)
2025-Present	Puma	J2O

== Players ==
=== Current squad ===
As of 11 July 2026

Note: Flags indicate national team as defined under FIFA eligibility rules; some limited exceptions apply. Players may hold more than one non-FIFA nationality.

No.	Pos.	Nation	Player
2	FW	JAM	Una Lue
3	MF	WAL	Phoebe Hampson
4	DF	ENG	Amii Kearly
5	DF	GRE	Panagiota Papaioannou (Captain)
7	FW	ENG	Charlotte Whitmore
9	FW	WAL	Phoebie Poole
10	MF	ENG	Lulu Jarvis
11	DF	IRL	Róisín Kivel
14	DF	ENG	Katie Wilson

No.	Pos.	Nation	Player
15	FW	ENG	Tamara Wilcock
16	DF	ENG	Ella Stephens
17	MF	ENG	Paris Dalton
18	DF	ENG	Caitlin Smith
19	MF	ENG	Ellie Noble
21	GK	WAL	Eilish Brogan
23	FW	WAL	Olivia Francis
24	FW	WAL	Tianna Teisar (on loan from Bristol City)
26	DF	ENG	Arabella Suttie

==== Retired numbers ====
- 12 – The Green Army

=== Notable players ===
- Jemma Rose – England
- Chloe Roberts – England U15
- Chynna Evans – England U15

== Honours ==
League

- South West Combination League (level 3)
  - Champions: 2010–11, 2013–14
- FA National League Division One South West (level 4)
  - Champions: 2017–18

Cup

- Devon Women's County Cup
  - Winners: 2001–02, 2002–03, 2003–04, 2004–05, 2005–06, 2025-26
