= 2026–27 Newcastle United W.F.C. season =

Newcastle United
2026–27 season
- Owner: Public Investment Fund (85%); RB Sports & Media (15%)
- Manager: Tanya Oxtoby
- Stadium: Gateshead International Stadium; St James' Park (select games)
- WSL2: 1st
- FA Cup: Third round
- Players Cup: League Phase
- Top goalscorer: League: Martha Thomas (8 goals); All: Martha Thomas (6 goals)
- Highest home attendance: 2,773 (vs Sunderland, Players Cup, 18 October 2026) at Gateshead International Stadium
- Lowest home attendance: 1,560 (vs Sheffield United, WSL 2, 20 September 2026) at Gateshead International Stadium
- Average home league attendance: 1,664
- Biggest win: 4–0 (vs Leicester City (H), WSL2, 27 September 2026); 5–1 (vs Durham (A), Players Cup, 1 November 2026)
- Biggest defeat: 1–3 (vs Aston Villa (A), Players Cup, 30 September 2026); 0–2 (vs Everton (A), Players Cup, 21 October 2026)
Home colours	Away colours	Third colours
- All statistics correct as of 15 November 2026.

The 2026–27 season is Newcastle United Women's third season in the Women's Super League 2 (WSL2), which stands at level two of the women's football league pyramid. Along with competing in the WSL2, the club will also contest two domestic cup competitions: the FA Cup and Players Cup.

== Squad ==
No.	Nat.	Player	Date of birth (age)	Since	Last contract	Previous club
Goalkeepers
1	(Finland)	Anna Tamminen	30 October 1994 (age 32)	2025	September 2025	(Sweden) Hammarby
12	(England)	Kayla Rendell	29 June 2001 (age 25)	2026	July 2026	(England) Manchester United (loan)
54	(England)	Sofia Borg	19 August 2008 (age 18)	2026	September 2026	Academy
Defenders
2	(Scotland)	Charlotte Wardlaw	20 February 2003 (age 23)	2025	January 2025	(England) Chelsea
3	(England)	Demi Stokes	12 December 1991 (age 34)	2024	August 2026	(England) Manchester City
5	(England)	Jemma Purfield	21 February 1997 (age 29)	2025	July 2025	(England) Southampton
15	(Hungary)	Hanna Németh	17 September 1998 (age 28)	2026	July 2026	(Germany) Werder Bremen
18	(Australia)	Kaitlyn Torpey	17 March 2000 (age 26)	2026	January 2026	(United States) Portland Thorns
22	(Wales)	Lois Joel	2 June 1999 (age 27)	2024	July 2026	(England) London City Lionesses
23	(Wales)	Gemma Evans	1 August 1996 (age 30)	2026	July 2026	(England) Liverpool
25	(Republic of Ireland)	Aoife Mannion	24 September 1995 (age 31)	2025	July 2025	(England) Manchester United
27	(Scotland)	Rachel McLauchlan (c)	7 July 1997 (age 29)	2026	July 2026	(England) Brighton & Hove Albion
53	(England)	Abbie Richardson	26 April 2008 (age 18)	2026	September 2026	Academy
99	(England)	Lia Cataldo	11 February 2001 (age 25)	2024	January 2024	(England) Crystal Palace
Midfielders
4	(England)	Jordan Nobbs	8 December 1992 (age 33)	2025	July 2025	(England) Aston Villa
6	(England)	Elysia Boddy	20 January 2004 (age 22)	2023	September 2024	(England) Bristol City
7	(United States)	Morgan Gautrat	26 February 1993 (age 33)	2026	March 2026	(United States) Orlando Pride
8	(England)	Emma Kelly	26 January 1997 (age 29)	2023	June 2026	(England) Sunderland
10	(England)	Mollie Lambert	14 June 1998 (age 28)	2026	July 2026	(England) Durham
11	(Scotland)	Freya Gregory	12 January 2003 (age 23)	2025	January 2025	(England) Aston Villa
16	(Iceland)	Hildur Antonsdóttir	18 September 1995 (age 31)	2026	July 2026	(Spain) Madrid CFF
19	(England)	Katie Bradley	25 December 2001 (age 24)	2026	July 2026	(England) Charlton Athletic
24	(England)	Ashanti Akpan	24 November 2005 (age 20)	2026	January 2026	(England) Chelsea
Forwards
9	(Scotland)	Kathleen McGovern	27 June 2002 (age 24)	2026	July 2026	(Scotland) Hibernian
14	(Sweden)	Emilia Larsson	13 July 1998 (age 28)	2026	January 2026	(Sweden) Rosengård
17	(Scotland)	Martha Thomas	31 May 1996 (age 30)	2026	July 2026	(England) Tottenham Hotspur
20	(Finland)	Oona Sevenius	28 April 2004 (age 22)	2025	August 2025	(Sweden) Rosengård
26	(Scotland)	Beth Lumsden	26 July 1999 (age 27)	2024	January 2024	(England) Portsmouth
30	(England)	Jessie Gale	23 August 2006 (age 20)	2026	August 2026	(England) Arsenal (loan)
33	(Republic of Ireland)	Leanne Kiernan	27 April 1999 (age 27)	2026	July 2026	(England) Liverpool
45	(Wales)	Casi Gregson	3 November 2007 (age 19)	2026	October 2026	Academy

== Transfers and contracts ==
=== Transfers in ===
Date	Position	Nationality	Player	From	Ref.
3 July 2026	DF	(Wales)	Gemma Evans	(England) Liverpool	
8 July 2026	MF	(Iceland)	Hildur Antonsdóttir	(Spain) Madrid CFF	
10 July 2026	DF	(Hungary)	Hanna Németh	(Germany) Werder Bremen	
14 July 2026	FW	(Scotland)	Kathleen McGovern	(Scotland) Hibernian	
16 July 2026	DF	(Scotland)	Rachel McLauchlan	(England) Brighton & Hove Albion	
24 July 2026	MF	(England)	Mollie Lambert	(England) Durham	
27 July 2026	MF	(England)	Katie Bradley	(England) Charlton Athletic	
28 July 2026	FW	(Republic of Ireland)	Leanne Kiernan	(England) Liverpool	
29 July 2026	FW	(Scotland)	Martha Thomas	(England) Tottenham Hotspur	

=== Loans in ===
Date	Position	Nationality	Player	From	Ref.
27 July 2026	GK	(England)	Kayla Rendell	(England) Manchester United	
6 August 2026	FW	(England)	Jessie Gale	(England) Arsenal	
25 October 2026	GK	(Wales)	Soffia Kelly	(England) Aston Villa	
8 November 2026	GK	(England)	Anna Pedersen	(England) Charlton Athletic	

=== Contract extensions ===
Date	Position	Nationality	Player	At Club Since	Ref.
18 June 2026	MF	(England)	Emma Kelly	2023	
2 July 2026	MF	(Wales)	Lois Joel	2024	
4 August 2026	DF	(England)	Demi Stokes	2024	
23 September 2026	DF	(England)	Abbie Richardson	2026 (Note: First professional contract)	
24 September 2026	GK	(England)	Sofia Borg	2026	
2 October 2026	FW	(Wales)	Casi Gregson	2026	
12 November 2026	MF	(Scotland)	Beth Lumsden	2024	

=== Transfers out ===
Date	Position	Nationality	Player	To	Ref.
2 May 2026	MF	(England)	Molly Pike	Retired	
8 May 2026	DF	(England)	Charlotte Potts	Retired	
1 June 2026	FW	(United States)	Simone Charley	(United States) Brooklyn FC	
1 June 2026	DF	(England)	Deanna Cooper	(England) Burnley	
1 June 2026	GK	(Scotland)	Hannah Hawkins		
1 June 2026	FW	(Jamaica)	Shania Hayles	(England) Nottingham Forest	
1 June 2026	GK	(England)	Claudia Moan	(Saudi Arabia) Al-Ahli Saudi	
24 July 2026	FW	(Republic of Ireland)	Emily Murphy	(England) Brighton & Hove Albion	
7 August 2026	DF	(Poland)	Małgorzata Grec	(Poland) Górnik Łęczna	

=== Loans out ===
Date	Position	Nationality	Player	To	Ref.
21 August 2026	MF	(Scotland)	Jasmine McQuade	(Scotland) Hibernian	

== Pre-season ==
19 July 2026	Newcastle United	4–0	Rangers	Gateshead
	McQuade; Sevenius; Lumsden; McGovern	Report		Stadium: Gateshead International Stadium; Attendance: 0 (behind closed doors)

8 August 2026	Newcastle United	0–1	Everton	Gateshead
		Report	van Gool 60'	Stadium: Gateshead International Stadium; Attendance: 0 (behind closed doors)

16 August 2026	Newcastle United	0–2	Inter Milan	Newcastle upon Tyne
		Report	Detruyer 26'; Polli 86'	Stadium: St James' Park

19 August 2026	Manchester United	0–1	Newcastle United	La Manga
	McGovern			Stadium: La Manga Club Football Stadium; Attendance: 0 (behind closed doors)

23 August 2026	Valencia	2–2 (7–8 p)	Newcastle United	La Manga
	Mascarell 43'; Marcano 68'		Nobbs 33'; Lumsden 79'	Stadium: La Manga Club Football Stadium
	Penalties
	Penalty scored Penalty missed		(penalty scored) McGovern; (penalty scored) Lambert; (penalty scored) Lumsden; (penalty scored) Nobbs; (penalty scored) Purfield; (penalty scored) Joel; (penalty scored) Torpey; (penalty scored) Gregory

30 August 2026	Newcastle United	3–1	Burnley	Newcastle upon Tyne
14:00 BST	McGovern 18', 51', 73'	Report	Finn 15'	Stadium: St James' Park

== Competitions ==
=== Women's Super League 2 ===
==== League table ====
Pos	Team	Pld	W	D	L	GF	GA	GD	Pts	Qualification
1	Newcastle United	8	6	2	0	19	3	+16	20	Promotion to the WSL (Note: Dependent on obtaining a licence.)
2	Sunderland	8	5	2	1	16	8	+8	17	Qualification for pre-qualifying play-off
3	Ipswich Town	8	5	2	1	13	7	+6	17	Qualification for pre-qualifying play-off
4	Bristol City	8	5	1	2	17	11	+6	16	
5	Nottingham Forest	8	3	5	0	15	9	+6	14	

Updated to match(es) played on 15 November 2026. Source: WSL 2 League Table
Rules for classification: 1) Points; 2) Goal difference; 3) Number of goals scored

==== Results summary ====
Overall								Home						Away					
Pld	W	D	L	GF	GA	GD	Pts	W	D	L	GF	GA	GD	W	D	L	GF	GA	GD
8	6	2	0	19	3	+16	20	4	0	0	13	1	+12	2	2	0	6	2	+4

Last updated: 15 November 2026.
Source: WSL2 Football

==== Results by matchday ====
Matchday	1	2	3	4	5	6	7	8	9	10	11	12	13	14	15	16	17	18	19	20	21	22
Ground	H	A	H	H	A	A	H	A	H	A	H	A	A	H	A	H	A	H	A	H	A	H
Result	W	W	W	W	W	D	W	D														
Position	3	3	1	1	1	1	1	1														

Updated to match(es) played on 15 November 2026. Source: WSL2 Football
A = Away; H = Home; W = Win; D = Draw; L = Loss; P = Postponed

==== Matches ====
6 September 2026 1	Newcastle United	2–0	Wolverhampton Wanderers	Gateshead
14:00 BST	Lumsden 8' (yellow card) 17'; Marshall 18' (o.g.)	Report	Francis (yellow card) 86'	Stadium: Gateshead International Stadium; Attendance: 1,671; Referee: Jodie Hunter

12 September 2026 2	Bristol City	0–1	Newcastle United	Bristol
17:15 BST	Lambert (yellow card) 41'; McGovern 52'	Report	Apostolakis (yellow card) 56'; Markvardsen (yellow card) 82'; Wos (yellow card) 90+5'	Stadium: Ashton Gate; Attendance: 1,922; Referee: Aimee Keir

20 September 2026 3	Newcastle United	4–1	Sheffield United	Gateshead
14:00 BST	Lumsden 15'; Torpey 18'; Thomas 46', 53'	Report	Quinn 32'; Rouse (yellow card) 78'	Stadium: Gateshead International Stadium; Attendance: 1,560; Referee: Amy Fearn

27 September 2026 4	Newcastle United	4–0	Leicester City	Gateshead
14:00 BST	Wardlaw 12' (yellow card) 16'; Antonsdóttir (yellow card) 66'; Thomas 67', 69'; Mannion 90+5'	Report	Mayling (yellow card) 90+1'	Stadium: Gateshead International Stadium; Attendance: 1,760; Referee: Grace Lowe

4 October 2026 5	Durham	0–3	Newcastle United	Durham
12:00 BST	Bradley (yellow card) 43'; Hepple (yellow card) 62'; Pennock (yellow card) 72'	Report	Antonsdóttir 34'; Thomas (yellow card) 45+4' (goal) 87'; Nobbs 65'; McGovern (yellow card) 71'	Stadium: Maiden Castle; Attendance: 1,211; Referee: Lisa Benn

25 October 2026 6	Nottingham Forest	2–2	Newcastle United	West Bridgford
14:00 GMT	McKenna 10', 15' (pen.); C. Thomas (yellow card) 56'; Rowe (yellow card) 67'	Report	McGovern 50'; Bradley (yellow card) 64'; Thomas 86'	Stadium: City Ground; Attendance: 2,203; Referee: Stacey Pearson

8 November 2026 7	Newcastle United	3–0	Burnley	Newcastle upon Tyne
14:00 GMT	McGovern 11'; Cooper 17' (o.g.); Thomas 62'	Report		Stadium: St James' Park; Referee: Ella Broad

15 November 2026 8	Sunderland	0–0	Newcastle United	Monkwearmouth
14:00 GMT	Corbyn (yellow card) 56'	Report	Antonsdóttir (yellow card) 30'; Kiernan (yellow card) 69'; Thomas (yellow card) 74'	Stadium: Stadium of Light; Referee: Sophie Dennington

20 December 2026 9	Newcastle United	v	Watford	Gateshead
14:00 GMT				Stadium: Gateshead International Stadium

10 January 2027 10	Ipswich Town	v	Newcastle United	Myland
14:00 GMT				Stadium: JobServe Community Stadium

24 January 2027 11	Newcastle United	v	Southampton	Newcastle upon Tyne
14:00 GMT				Stadium: St James' Park

27 January 2027 12	Wolverhampton Wanderers	v	Newcastle United	Wellington
19:30 GMT				Stadium: SEAH Stadium

31 January 2027 13	Leicester City	v	Newcastle United	Leicester
15:00 GMT				Stadium: King Power Stadium

7 February 2027 14	Newcastle United	v	Nottingham Forest	Newcastle upon Tyne
14:00 GMT				Stadium: St James' Park

14 February 2027 15	Southampton	v	Newcastle United	Eastleigh
14:00 GMT				Stadium: Silverlake Stadium

14 March 2027 16	Newcastle United	v	Durham	Newcastle upon Tyne
14:00 GMT				Stadium: St James' Park

20 March 2027 17	Sheffield United	v	Newcastle United	Sheffield
18:00 GMT				Stadium: Bramall Lane

28 March 2027 18	Newcastle United	v	Sunderland	Newcastle upon Tyne
14:00 BST				Stadium: St James' Park

4 April 2027 19	Watford	v	Newcastle United	Watford
14:00 BST				Stadium: Vicarage Road

11 April 2027 20	Newcastle United	v	Ipswich Town	Gateshead
14:00 BST				Stadium: Gateshead International Stadium

2 May 2027 21	Burnley	v	Newcastle United	Burnley
14:00 BST				Stadium: Turf Moor

8 May 2027 22	Newcastle United	v	Bristol City	Newcastle upon Tyne
BST				Stadium: St James' Park

=== FA Cup ===
As a member of the second tier, Newcastle United will enter the FA Cup in the third round.

13 December 2026 Third round	Mancunian Unity	v	Newcastle United
GMT

=== WSL Players Cup ===
Pos	Grp	Team	Pld	W	PW	PL	L	GF	GA	GD	Pts
15	SR	Ipswich Town	4	1	0	1	2	6	5	+1	4
16	NR	Nottingham Forest	4	1	0	1	2	5	6	−1	4
17	NR	Newcastle United	4	1	0	0	3	6	7	−1	3
18	NR	Burnley	4	1	0	0	3	3	11	−8	3
19	SR	Leicester City	4	0	1	1	2	3	12	−9	3

Updated to match(es) played on 18 November 2026. Source: WSL Football
Rules for classification: 1) Points; 2) Goal difference; 3) Number of goals scored; 4) Number of wins; 5) Head-to-head record

30 September 2026 1	Aston Villa	3–1	Newcastle United	Hednesford
19:30 BST	Murphy 10'; Maltby (yellow card) 45'; Kendall 83', 90+2'	Report	Sevenius 26'; Evans (yellow card) 87'	Stadium: Keys Park; Attendance: 535; Referee: Joanne Horwood

18 October 2026 2	Newcastle United	0–1	Sunderland	Gateshead
14:00 BST	Lambert (yellow card) 22'; Antonsdóttir (yellow card) 36'; Thomas (penalty missed) 65'; Gregory (yellow card) 87'	Report	Dent (yellow card) 32'; Kitching 49'	Stadium: Gateshead International Stadium; Attendance: 2,773; Referee: Melissa Burgin

21 October 2026 3	Everton	2–0	Newcastle United	Walton
19:00 BST	Vignola (yellow card) 66' (goal) 81', 84'	Report	Kiernan (yellow card) 48'; Cataldo (yellow card) 65'	Stadium: Goodison Park; Attendance: 1,138; Referee: Grace Lowe

1 November 2026 4	Durham	1–5	Newcastle United	Simonside
12:00 GMT	Watson 14'	Report	Thomas 26', 50'; Lumsden 37', 57'; Pennock 76' (o.g.); Gregory (yellow card) 76'	Stadium: Wolf Competitions Stadium; Attendance: 1,038; Referee: Julia Kings

22 November 2026 5	Newcastle United	v	Nottingham Forest	Gateshead
14:00 GMT		Report		Stadium: Gateshead International Stadium

16 December 2026 6	Newcastle United	v	Manchester United	Gateshead
19:00 GMT		Report		Stadium: Gateshead International Stadium

== Statistics ==
=== Appearances and goals ===
As of match played 15 November 2026

No.	Pos	Nat	Player	Total		WSL2		FA Cup		Players Cup	
No.	Pos	Nat	Player	Apps	Goals	Apps	Goals	Apps	Goals	Apps	Goals
Goalkeepers
1	GK	(Finland) FIN	Anna Tamminen	7	0	6	0	0	0	1	0
12	GK	(England) ENG	Kayla Rendell	6	0	2	0	0	0	3+1	0
54	GK	(England) ENG	Sofia Borg	0	0	0	0	0	0	0	0
Defenders
2	DF	(Scotland) SCO	Charlotte Wardlaw	5	1	1	1	0	0	4	0
3	DF	(England) ENG	Demi Stokes	1	0	0	0	0	0	0+1	0
5	DF	(England) ENG	Jemma Purfield	7	0	5	0	0	0	1+1	0
15	DF	(Hungary) HUN	Hanna Németh	5	0	2+1	0	0	0	2	0
18	DF	(Australia) AUS	Kaitlyn Torpey	9	1	8	1	0	0	1	0
22	DF	(Wales) WAL	Lois Joel	12	0	4+4	0	0	0	3+1	0
23	DF	(Wales) WAL	Gemma Evans	7	0	3+1	0	0	0	3	0
25	DF	(Republic of Ireland) IRL	Aoife Mannion	8	1	6	1	0	0	2	0
27	DF	(Scotland) SCO	Rachel McLauchlan	8	0	7	0	0	0	1	0
53	DF	(England) ENG	Abbie Richardson	2	0	0	0	0	0	1+1	0
99	DF	(England) ENG	Lia Cataldo	2	0	0	0	0	0	1+1	0
Midfielders
4	MF	(England) ENG	Jordan Nobbs	9	1	4+2	1	0	0	3	0
6	MF	(England) ENG	Elysia Boddy	0	0	0	0	0	0	0	0
7	MF	(United States) USA	Morgan Gautrat	0	0	0	0	0	0	0	0
10	MF	(England) ENG	Mollie Lambert	12	0	5+3	0	0	0	3+1	0
11	MF	(Scotland) SCO	Freya Gregory	6	0	0+3	0	0	0	1+2	0
16	MF	(Iceland) ISL	Hildur Antonsdóttir	9	1	6+1	1	0	0	1+1	0
19	MF	(England) ENG	Katie Bradley	10	0	6+1	0	0	0	1+2	0
24	MF	(England) ENG	Ashanti Akpan	1	0	0	0	0	0	0+1	0
Forwards
9	FW	(Scotland) SCO	Kathleen McGovern	11	3	7+1	3	0	0	2+1	0
14	FW	(Sweden) SWE	Emilia Larsson	2	0	0+1	0	0	0	1	0
17	FW	(Scotland) SCO	Martha Thomas	10	9	8	7	0	0	2	2
20	FW	(Finland) FIN	Oona Sevenius	7	1	0+4	0	0	0	2+1	1
26	FW	(Scotland) SCO	Beth Lumsden	10	4	8	2	0	0	2	2
30	FW	(England) ENG	Jessie Gale	7	0	0+4	0	0	0	1+2	0
33	FW	(Republic of Ireland) IRL	Leanne Kiernan	9	0	0+6	0	0	0	2+1	0
45	FW	(Wales) WAL	Casi Gregson	1	0	0	0	0	0	0+1	0
Out on loan, maternity leave etc.
8	MF	(England) ENG	Emma Kelly	0	0	0	0	0	0	0	0
21	MF	(Scotland) SCO	Jasmine McQuade	0	0	0	0	0	0	0	0

=== Clean sheets ===
Rank	No.	Nat.	Player	WSL2	FA Cup	Players Cup	Total
1	1	(Finland)	Anna Tamminen	5	0	0	5
2	12	(England)	Kayla Rendell	1	0	0	1
3	54	(England)	Sofia Borg	0	0	0	0

=== Disciplinary record ===
Rank	No.	Pos.	Nat.	Player	WSL2			FA Cup			Players Cup			Total		
Rank	No.	Pos.	Nat.	Player	Yellow card	(yellow card) (yellow-red card)	Red card	Yellow card	(yellow card) (yellow-red card)	Red card	Yellow card	(yellow card) (yellow-red card)	Red card	Yellow card	(yellow card) (yellow-red card)	Red card
1	16	MF	(Iceland)	Hildur Antonsdóttir	2	0	0	0	0	0	1	0	0	3	0	0
2	10	MF	(England)	Mollie Lambert	1	0	0	0	0	0	1	0	0	2	0	0
2	11	MF	(Scotland)	Freya Gregory	0	0	0	0	0	0	2	0	0	2	0	0
2	17	FW	(Scotland)	Martha Thomas	2	0	0	0	0	0	0	0	0	2	0	0
2	23	DF	(Wales)	Gemma Evans	1	0	0	0	0	0	1	0	0	2	0	0
2	30	FW	(Republic of Ireland)	Leanne Kiernan	1	0	0	0	0	0	1	0	0	2	0	0
7	2	DF	(England)	Charlotte Wardlaw	1	0	0	0	0	0	0	0	0	1	0	0
7	9	FW	(Scotland)	Kathleen McGovern	1	0	0	0	0	0	0	0	0	1	0	0
7	15	DF	(Hungary)	Hanna Németh	1	0	0	0	0	0	0	0	0	1	0	0
7	19	MF	(England)	Katie Bradley	1	0	0	0	0	0	0	0	0	1	0	0
7	26	FW	(Scotland)	Beth Lumsden	1	0	0	0	0	0	0	0	0	1	0	0
7	99	DF	(England)	Lia Cataldo	0	0	0	0	0	0	1	0	0	1	0	0
Total					12	0	0	0	0	0	7	0	0	19	0	0
