= List of English women's football transfers summer 2026 =

The 2026 English women's football summer transfer window ran from 16 June to 3 September 2026. Players without a club could be signed at any time, clubs could sign players on loan dependent on their league's regulations, and clubs could sign a goalkeeper on an emergency loan if they had no registered senior goalkeeper available. This list includes transfers featuring at least one club from either the Women's Super League or the Women's Super League 2 that were completed after the end of the winter 2025–26 transfer window on 3 February and before the end of the 2026 summer window.

== Transfers ==
All players and clubs without a flag are English.

Date	Name	Moving from	Moving to	Fee	Ref.
12 March 2026	(Norway) Guro Reiten	Chelsea	(United States) Gotham FC	Loan	
13 March 2026	(United States) Morgan Gautrat	(United States) Orlando Pride	Newcastle United	Free	
18 March 2026	Gesa Marashi	London City Lionesses	(Norway) LSK Kvinner	Loan	
27 March 2026	(United States) Catarina Macario	Chelsea	(United States) San Diego Wave	Undisclosed	
1 April 2026	Issy Hobson	Everton	(Norway) Rosenborg BK	Loan	
24 April 2026	(Spain) Paula Tomás	Aston Villa	Retired		
29 April 2026	Millie Bright	Chelsea	Retired		
30 April 2026	Laura Coombs	Manchester City	Retired		
2 May 2026	Molly Pike	Newcastle United	Retired		
5 May 2026	(Northern Ireland) Danielle Maxwell	Burnley	(Northern Ireland) Cliftonville	Free	
5 May 2026	(Northern Ireland) Louise McDaniel	Burnley	(Northern Ireland) Cliftonville	Free	
7 May 2026	Lucy Staniforth	Aston Villa	Retired		
8 May 2026	Charlotte Potts	Newcastle United	Retired		
22 May 2026	Ania Denham	Wolverhampton Wanderers	(United States) Middle Tennessee Blue Raiders	Free	
22 May 2026	Beth Merrick	Wolverhampton Wanderers	Retired		
24 May 2026	(Norway) Elise Stenevik	Everton	(Germany) 1. FC Köln	Free	
25 May 2026	Jade Cross	Wolverhampton Wanderers	Retired		
27 May 2026	(France) Constance Picaud	(France) Fleury	West Ham United	Free	
28 May 2026	(Republic of Ireland) Lily Agg	Birmingham City	Retired		
5 June 2026	(Scotland) Lucy Hope	Everton	Retired		
12 June 2026	Beth Mead	Arsenal	Manchester City	Free	
12 June 2026	(Denmark) Amalie Thestrup	Charlton Athletic	(Denmark) Brøndby IF	Free	
12 June 2026	(Austria) Manuela Zinsberger	Arsenal	(Germany) Borussia Dortmund	Free	
13 June 2026	Jess Harvey	Wolverhampton Wanderers	Boldmere	Free	
14 June 2026	Charlotte Poole	Wolverhampton Wanderers	Worcester City	Free	
15 June 2026	(Germany) Shekiera Martinez	West Ham United	Tottenham Hotspur	Undisclosed	
15 June 2026	(Northern Ireland) Sarah Robson	Durham	Middlesbrough	Free	
16 June 2026	(Spain) Leila Ouahabi	Manchester City	(United States) Chicago Stars	Free	
17 June 2026	(Scotland) Kirsty Hanson	Aston Villa	Tottenham Hotspur	Undisclosed	
17 June 2026	(Scotland) Mia McAulay	(Scotland) Rangers	Aston Villa	Free	
18 June 2026	Aimee Kelly	Burnley	Huddersfield Town	Free	
19 June 2026	(Spain) Laia Codina	Arsenal	West Ham United	Free	
19 June 2026	Mary Earps	(France) Paris Saint-Germain	London City Lionesses	Free	
19 June 2026	Abbie Lafayette	Sheffield United	Nottingham Forest	Free	
22 June 2026	(Switzerland) Nadine Riesen	(Germany) Eintracht Frankfurt	West Ham United	Free	
23 June 2026	Isabel Watts	Southampton	AFC Bournemouth	Free	
24 June 2026	Jasmine Matthews	Burnley	Wolverhampton Wanderers	Free	
24 June 2026	Kyra Robertson	Ipswich Town	AFC Bournemouth	Free	
25 June 2026	Bethan Marriott	Wolverhampton Wanderers	Worcester City	Free	
25 June 2026	(Netherlands) Victoria Pelova	Arsenal	Tottenham Hotspur	Free	
26 June 2026	(Canada) Sabrina D’Angelo	Aston Villa	(Canada) AFC Toronto	Free	
26 June 2026	Kit Graham	Tottenham Hotspur	Ipswich Town	Free	
27 June 2026	Hannah Coan	Portsmouth	Nottingham Forest	Free	
27 June 2026	(Scotland) Amy Rodgers	Nottingham Forest	(Denmark) Brøndby IF	Undisclosed	
29 June 2026	(Australia) Sam Kerr	Chelsea	(United States) Gotham FC	Free	
29 June 2026	(Scotland) Rosie Livingstone	(Scotland) Hibernian	Ipswich Town	Undisclosed	
30 June 2026	Eleanor Heeps	Tottenham Hotspur	Brighton & Hove Albion	Undisclosed	
30 June 2026	Megan Hornby	Portsmouth	Ipswich Town	Free	
30 June 2026	(Norway) Kamilla Melgård	(Spain) Madrid CFF	Aston Villa	Undisclosed	
30 June 2026	(Norway) Selma Panengstuen	(Norway) SK Brann	Tottenham Hotspur	Undisclosed	
1 July 2026	(Slovenia) Sara Agrež	(Germany) 1. FC Köln	Liverpool	Free	
1 July 2026	(Netherlands) Caitlin Dijkstra	(Germany) VfL Wolfsburg	Tottenham Hotspur	Undisclosed	
1 July 2026	(Germany) Vivien Endemann	(Germany) VfL Wolfsburg	Liverpool	Free	
1 July 2026	(Norway) Emilie Joramo	(Sweden) Hammarby	Brighton & Hove Albion	Free	
1 July 2026	(Poland) Nadia Krezyman	(France) Dijon	Brighton & Hove Albion	Free	
1 July 2026	Melissa Lawley	Everton	Wolverhampton Wanderers	Free	
1 July 2026	(Republic of Ireland) Katie McCabe	Arsenal	Chelsea	Free	
1 July 2026	(Spain) Andrea Medina	(Spain) Atlético Madrid	Manchester United	Free	
1 July 2026	(Netherlands) Nadine Noordam	Brighton & Hove Albion	(Netherlands) Ajax	Undisclosed	
1 July 2026	(Norway) Guro Reiten	Chelsea	(United States) Gotham FC	Free	
1 July 2026	(Republic of Ireland) Jenna Slattery	(Scotland) Hearts	Ipswich Town	Free	
1 July 2026	(Netherlands) Katja Snoeijs	Everton	(Netherlands) Ajax	Free	
1 July 2026	(Denmark) Amalie Vangsgaard	(Italy) Juventus	Aston Villa	Undisclosed	
1 July 2026	Katie Zelem	London City Lionesses	West Ham United	Undisclosed	
2 July 2026	(Germany) Nicole Anyomi	(Germany) Eintracht Frankfurt	London City Lionesses	Free	
2 July 2026	(Belgium) Yana Daniëls	Burnley	Wolverhampton Wanderers	Free	
2 July 2026	(Iceland) Hlín Eiríksdóttir	Leicester City	(Sweden) Malmö	Undisclosed	
2 July 2026	(Wales) Elise Hughes	Crystal Palace	Sunderland	Free	
2 July 2026	Mari Ward	Bristol City	Liverpool	Free	
3 July 2026	Cerys Brown	London City Lionesses	Nottingham Forest	Undisclosed	
3 July 2026	(United States) Sierra Enge	(France) RC Strasbourg	Crystal Palace	Free	
3 July 2026	(Wales) Gemma Evans	Liverpool	Newcastle United	Free	
3 July 2026	(Austria) Verena Hanshaw	West Ham	Austria Wien	Free	
3 July 2026	Poppy Irvine	Birmingham City	Norwich City	Free	
3 July 2026	Abbey Jones	Durham	West Bromwich Albion	Free	
3 July 2026	(Norway) Justine Kielland	(Germany) VfL Wolfsburg	Aston Villa	Undisclosed	
3 July 2026	(Japan) Manaka Matsukubo	(United States) North Carolina Courage	Chelsea	Undisclosed	
3 July 2026	Georgia Stanway	(Germany) Bayern Munich	Arsenal	Free	
3 July 2026	(Jamaica) Natasha Thomas	Ipswich Town	(Wales) Wrexham	Free	
3 July 2026	(Denmark) Janni Thomsen	(United States) Utah Royals	London City Lionesses	Undisclosed	
3 July 2026	(Scotland) Chloe Warrington	(Scotland) Glasgow City	Sheffield United	Free	
4 July 2026	(Switzerland) Lia Wälti	(Italy) Juventus	Brighton & Hove Albion	Undisclosed	
6 July 2026	Tara Bourne	Southampton	Sunderland	Free	
6 July 2026	(Germany) Selina Cerci	(Germany) TSG Hoffenheim	Arsenal	Free	
6 July 2026	Amelia Hiscox	Wolverhampton Wanderers	Kidderminster Harriers	Loan	
6 July 2026	Skye Owen	Wolverhampton Wanderers	Boldmere	Loan	
6 July 2026	Jade Pennock	(United States) Sporting JAX	Durham	Free	
6 July 2026	(Sweden) Johanna Rytting Kaneryd	Chelsea	(France) OL Lyonnes	Undisclosed	
6 July 2026	(Scotland) Eilidh Shore	(Scotland) Hearts	Bristol City	Free	
6 July 2026	Olivia Wilkes	Burnley	AFC Bournemouth	Free	
7 July 2026	(Australia) Alexia Apostolakis	(Australia) Melbourne City	Bristol City	Free	
7 July 2026	(New Zealand) Hannah Blake	Durham	(Scotland) Rangers	Free	
7 July 2026	(Germany) Rafaela Borggräfe	Liverpool	(Germany) Bayer Leverkusen	Loan	
7 July 2026	(Scotland) Leah Eddie	(Scotland) Rangers	Leicester City	Free	
7 July 2026	(Republic of Ireland) Mel Filis	(Italy) Sassuolo	Wolverhampton Wanderers	Free	
7 July 2026	Hollie Olding	Nottingham Forest	Wolverhampton Wanderers	Free	
7 July 2026	Sophie Peskett	Ipswich Town	Brighton & Hove Albion	Undisclosed	
7 July 2026	(Chile) Camila Sáez	West Ham United	(Spain) Valencia	Free	
7 July 2026	Ruby Seaby	Ipswich Town	(Scotland) Glasgow City	Free	
8 July 2026	(Iceland) Hildur Antonsdóttir	(Spain) Madrid CFF	Newcastle United	Free	
8 July 2026	(Northern Ireland) Casey Howe	Nottingham Forest	(Scotland) Celtic	Free	
8 July 2026	Summer Hughes	Ipswich Town	Portsmouth	Free	
8 July 2026	Aimee Palmer	Southampton	Ipswich Town	Free	
8 July 2026	(Spain) Alexia Putellas	(Spain) Barcelona	London City Lionesses	Free	
8 July 2026	(Switzerland) Géraldine Reuteler	(Germany) Eintracht Frankfurt	Arsenal	Free	
8 July 2026	(Canada) Shelina Zadorsky	West Ham United	(Canada) AFC Toronto	Free	
9 July 2026	(Scotland) Georgia Hunter	(Scotland) Hearts	Ipswich Town	Free	
9 July 2026	Layla Proctor	Plymouth Argyle	Wolverhampton Wanderers	Free	
9 July 2026	(Scotland) Kirsty Smith	Nottingham Forest	(Scotland) Rangers	Undisclosed	
10 July 2026	(Scotland) Eilidh Adams	(Scotland) Hibernian	Ipswich Town	Free	
10 July 2026	(Spain) Ona Batlle	(Spain) Barcelona	Arsenal	Free	
10 July 2026	(Republic of Ireland) Dee Bradley	Burnley	Durham	Free	
10 July 2026	Niamh Charles	Chelsea	Manchester City	£500,000	
10 July 2026	Deanna Cooper	Newcastle United	Burnley	Free	
10 July 2026	Emma Doyle	Burnley	Halifax	Free	
10 July 2026	Teyah Goldie	London City Lionesses	Crystal Palace	Loan	
10 July 2026	(Scotland) Christie Harrison-Murray	Birmingham City	Burnley	Free	
10 July 2026	(Finland) Lotta Lindström	London City Lionesses	Bristol City	Undisclosed	
10 July 2026	(Hungary) Hanna Németh	(Germany) Werder Bremen	Newcastle United	Free	
10 July 2026	Ebony Salmon	Aston Villa	West Ham United	Free	
10 July 2026	(Wales) Poppy Soper	Rugby Borough	Sheffield United	Free	
10 July 2026	Fran Stenson	Southampton	Sunderland	Undisclosed	
11 July 2026	(Spain) Júlia Bartel	Chelsea	(Italy) Juventus	Undisclosed	
11 July 2026	(Nigeria) Toni Payne	Everton	(Italy) Inter Milan	Free	
12 July 2026	(United States) Michaela Kovacs	Birmingham City	(Denmark) Brøndby IF	Free	
12 July 2026	(Spain) Vicky Losada	Bristol City	(Spain) Badalona	Loan	
13 July 2026	(Australia) Charli Grant	Tottenham Hotspur	(Sweden) Malmö	Free	
13 July 2026	Khiara Keating	Manchester City	Liverpool	Free	
13 July 2026	(Spain) Mapi León	(Spain) Barcelona	London City Lionesses	Free	
13 July 2026	(France) Louna Ribadeira	Chelsea F.C.	(France) Fleury	Loan	
13 July 2026	(Venezuela) Mariana Speckmaier	Durham	(Scotland) Hearts	Undisclosed	
13 July 2026	Georgia Timms	(Scotland) Hearts	Ipswich Town	Free	
13 July 2026	Maddi Wilde	London City Lionesses	Burnley	Free	
14 July 2026	Ava Baker	Birmingham City	Ipswich Town	Loan	
14 July 2026	(Germany) Lisa Baum	(Germany) RB Leipzig	Arsenal	Undisclosed	
14 July 2026	Andria Georgiou	Watford	Real Bedford	Free	
14 July 2026	(Slovenia) Zara Kramžar	(Italy) AS Roma	Everton	Undisclosed	
14 July 2026	(Scotland) Kathleen McGovern	(Scotland) Hibernian	Newcastle United	Free	
14 July 2026	Sophie McLean	Watford	Real Bedford	Free	
14 July 2026	(France) Noémie Mouchon	Leicester City	Everton	Undisclosed	
14 July 2026	(Republic of Ireland) Denise O'Sullivan	Liverpool	(United States) Gotham FC	Loan	
14 July 2026	Gracie Pearse	Charlton Athletic	Sheffield United	Free	
14 July 2026	(Scotland) Kenzie Weir	Everton	Ipswich Town	Free	
14 July 2026	Charlie Wellings	Nottingham Forest	Burnley	Free	
15 July 2026	(France) Kadidiatou Diani	(France) OL Lyonnes	London City Lionesses	Undisclosed	
15 July 2026	Bethany England	Tottenham Hotspur	Crystal Palace	Free	
15 July 2026	(Scotland) Emma Lawton	(Scotland) Celtic	Ipswich Town	Free	
15 July 2026	(Norway) Lisa Naalsund	Manchester United	Birmingham City	Undisclosed	
15 July 2026	Emily Ramsey	Everton	Aston Villa	Free	
15 July 2026	Lydia Sallaway	Aston Villa	(Wales) Wrexham	Loan	
15 July 2026	Millie Turner	Manchester United	Birmingham City	Undisclosed	
16 July 2026	Brooke Aspin	Chelsea	Bristol City	Undisclosed	
16 July 2026	(Republic of Ireland) Kelly Brady	Crystal Palace	(Scotland) Glasgow City	Free	
16 July 2026	(Wales) Hannah Cain	Leicester City	Everton	Free	
16 July 2026	(Wales) Cadi Doran	(United States) Washington Huskies	Wolverhampton Wanderers	Free	
16 July 2026	(Sweden) Rosa Kafaji	Arsenal	London City Lionesses	Undisclosed	
16 July 2026	Lexi Lloyd-Smith	Bristol City	Crystal Palace	Free	
16 July 2026	Tegan McGowan	Birmingham City	Ipswich Town	Free	
16 July 2026	(Scotland) Rachel McLauchlan	Brighton & Hove Albion	Newcastle United	Undisclosed	
16 July 2026	(France) Jade Rastocle	(France) Montpellier	Birmingham City	Undisclosed	
16 July 2026	(United States) Noa Schumacher	(Scotland) Hibernian	Sunderland	Free	
16 July 2026	(Republic of Ireland) Kiera Sena	Southampton	Burnley	Free	
17 July 2026	(Switzerland) Luana Bühler	Tottenham Hotspur	(Switzerland) FC Zürich	Free	
17 July 2026	(France) Estelle Cascarino	(Italy) Juventus	West Ham United	Undisclosed	
17 July 2026	(Denmark) Isabella Damm	(Denmark) Brøndby	Arsenal	Undisclosed	
17 July 2026	(France) Kelly Gago	Everton	West Ham United	Undisclosed	
17 July 2026	(Norway) Mathilde Harviken	(Italy) Juventus	Aston Villa	Undisclosed	
17 July 2026	(Northern Ireland) Natalie Johnson	Nottingham Forest	Norwich City	Free	
17 July 2026	(Canada) Marie Levasseur	(France) Montpellier	Birmingham City	Free	
17 July 2026	(Netherlands) Femke Liefting	Chelsea	(Netherlands) Ajax	Loan	
17 July 2026	(Republic of Ireland) Maria Reynolds	(Republic of Ireland) Shamrock Rovers	Sheffield United	Undisclosed	
18 July 2026	(Australia) Grace Johnston	(Australia) Perth Glory	Charlton Athletic	Free	
18 July 2026	(Spain) Paula Partido	London City Lionesses	Charlton Athletic	Loan	
18 July 2026	Ella Pettit	Southampton	Portsmouth	Free	
18 July 2026	(Sweden) Julia Roddar	London City Lionesses	(Italy) Lazio	Free	
19 July 2026	Zara Bailey	Crystal Palace	Watford	Free	
20 July 2026	Hannah Blundell	Manchester United	Everton	Free	
20 July 2026	(Northern Ireland) Jackie Burns	Bristol City	Burnley	Free	
20 July 2026	(Japan) Mao Itamura	(Netherlands) Feyenoord	Liverpool	Undisclosed	
20 July 2026	(France) Melvine Malard	Manchester United	Chelsea	Undisclosed	
20 July 2026	Ellie Noble	Plymouth Argyle	Watford	Free	
20 July 2026	(Nigeria) Joy Omewa	Nottingham Forest	(Sweden) BK Häcken	Free	
21 July 2026	Abi Loydon	Wolverhampton Wanderers	Stoke City	Free	
21 July 2026	(Australia) Holly McNamara	(Australia) Melbourne City	Everton	Free	
21 July 2026	(Japan) Akane Okuma	(Japan) INAC Kobe Leonessa	Aston Villa	Free	
21 July 2026	Emily Orman	London City Lionesses	Wolverhampton Wanderers	Loan	
21 July 2026	(Republic of Ireland) Lucy Quinn	Birmingham City	Sheffield United	Free	
21 July 2026	Helen Seed	Burnley	AFC Fylde	Free	
21 July 2026	(France) Alice Sombath	(France) OL Lyonnes	Tottenham Hotspur	Undisclosed	
21 July 2026	(Republic of Ireland) Tyler Toland	Durham	Burnley	Free	
22 July 2026	(Republic of Ireland) Jamie Finn	Sunderland	Burnley	Free	
22 July 2026	(Finland) Anna Koivunen	(Sweden) Djurgårdens	Charlton Athletic	Undisclosed	
22 July 2026	(Northern Ireland) Leyla McFarland	Durham	(Switzerland) Rapperswil-Jona	Free	
22 July 2026	(Finland) Jutta Rantala	Leicester City	Everton	Undisclosed	
22 July 2026	(Spain) Misa Rodríguez	(Spain) Real Madrid	Arsenal	Free	
22 July 2026	(Sweden) Josefine Rybrink	Tottenham Hotspur	(Sweden) BK Häcken	Free	
22 July 2026	Lois Shooter	Chelsea	Nottingham Forest	Loan	
23 July 2026	Emma Bissell	Charlton Athletic	Bristol City	Free	
23 July 2026	Charlotte Fleming	Ipswich Town	Retired		
23 July 2026	Hannah Greenwood	Sunderland	Watford	Free	
23 July 2026	(Republic of Ireland) Jessica Hennessy	Bournemouth	Burnley	Free	
23 July 2026	Katie Startup	Manchester City	Birmingham City	Free	
23 July 2026	Codie Thomas	Manchester City	Nottingham Forest	Loan	
24 July 2026	Sophie Baggaley	Brighton & Hove Albion	Birmingham City	Free	
24 July 2026	(Australia) Leah Davidson	(Australia) Melbourne City	Charlton Athletic	Undisclosed	
24 July 2026	(Finland) Sanni Franssi	London City Lionesses	Sunderland	Loan	
24 July 2026	Mollie Lambert	Durham	Newcastle United	Free	
24 July 2026	Nelly Las	Leicester City	Chelsea	Undisclosed	
24 July 2026	(Germany) Janina Leitzig	Leicester City	Manchester United	Undisclosed	
24 July 2026	Sarah Mayling	Aston Villa	Leicester City	Undisclosed	
24 July 2026	(Republic of Ireland) Emily Murphy	Newcastle United	Brighton & Hove Albion	Undisclosed	
24 July 2026	(Republic of Ireland) Saoirse Noonan	(Scotland) Celtic	Watford	Free	
24 July 2026	(Australia) Racheal Quigley	Wolverhampton Wanderers	Stoke City	Free	
25 July 2026	(Australia) Rachel Lowe	(Australia) Melbourne Victory	Durham	Free	
25 July 2026	(Jamaica) Atlanta Primus	Southampton	Sunderland	Free	
26 July 2026	(Spain) Martina Fernández	Everton	(Spain) Barcelona	Undisclosed	
26 July 2026	Lyndsey Harkin	Wolverhampton Wanderers	Stoke City	Free	
26 July 2026	Demi Lambourne	Sunderland	Watford	Free	
27 July 2026	(France) Lorena Azzaro	(France) Paris FC	Charlton Athletic	Loan	
27 July 2026	Katie Bradley	Charlton Athletic	Newcastle United	Free	
27 July 2026	Laura Hartley	Ipswich Town	Hashtag United	Loan	
27 July 2026	Daisy Hind	Watford	Real Bedford	Free	
27 July 2026	Naomi Layzell	Manchester City	Everton	Loan	
27 July 2026	(Wales) Phoebie Poole	Plymouth Argyle	Watford	Free	
27 July 2026	Kayla Rendell	Manchester United	Newcastle United	Loan	
27 July 2026	Lily Whitelock	Watford	Real Bedford	Free	
28 July 2026	Laila Harbert	Arsenal	(United States) San Diego Wave	Undisclosed	
28 July 2026	(Belgium) Sari Kees	Leicester City	(Netherlands) Ajax	Undisclosed	
28 July 2026	(Republic of Ireland) Leanne Kiernan	Liverpool	Newcastle United	Undisclosed	
28 July 2026	Karin Muya	Charlton Athletic	Watford	Free	
29 July 2026	(Spain) Daniela Arques	(Portugal) Sporting CP	London City Lionesses	Undisclosed	
29 July 2026	Niamh Boothroyd	Sunderland	Middlesbrough	Loan	
29 July 2026	Sarah Brasero	West Ham United	(Spain) Deportivo Alavés	Loan	
29 July 2026	Niyah Dunbar	Sunderland	Norwich City	Loan	
29 July 2026	Olivia Fergusson	(Spain) RCD Espanyol	Durham	Free	
29 July 2026	(Wales) Olivia Francis	Plymouth Argyle	Wolverhampton Wanderers	Free	
29 July 2026	(Wales) Ellen Jones	Sunderland	Wolverhampton Wanderers	Free	
29 July 2026	Libbi McInnes	Sunderland	Southampton	Free	
29 July 2026	Ashleigh Neville	Leicester City	Charlton Athletic	Undisclosed	
29 July 2026	(New Zealand) Alina Santos	(United States) Denver Pioneers	Southampton	Free	
29 July 2026	(Republic of Ireland) Jessie Stapleton	West Ham United	Leicester City	Undisclosed	
29 July 2026	(Scotland) Martha Thomas	Tottenham Hotspur	Newcastle United	Undisclosed	
29 July 2026	(Wales) Tianna Teisar	Bristol City	Watford	Free	
29 July 2026	(Republic of Ireland) Jessica Ziu	West Ham United	Leicester City	Undisclosed	
30 July 2026	Rianna Dean	Ipswich Town	Fulham	Free	
30 July 2026	(Scotland) Niamh Murphy	Blackburn Rovers	Southampton	Free	
30 July 2026	Shannon O'Brien	Leicester City	Crystal Palace	Undisclosed	
30 July 2026	(Poland) Kinga Szemik	West Ham United	(Germany) Hamburger SV	Undisclosed	
31 July 2026	(Italy) Giulia Dragoni	(Spain) Barcelona	Chelsea	Undisclosed	
31 July 2026	Eva Hendle	Chelsea	(Scotland) Rangers	Loan	
31 July 2026	(Wales) Laura Hughes	(Australia) Melbourne City	Southampton	Free	
31 July 2026	(Republic of Ireland) Grace Moloney	Sunderland	Southampton	Free	
31 July 2026	Katie O'Hanlon	West Ham United	(Scotland) Aberdeen	Loan	
31 July 2026	Soraya Walsh	West Ham United	(Scotland) Aberdeen	Free	
1 August 2026	Gemma Bonner	Liverpool	(United States) Denver Summit	Free	
1 August 2026	Lily Dent	Brighton & Hove Albion	Sunderland	Loan	
3 August 2026	Molly Bartrip	Tottenham Hotspur	Crystal Palace	Undisclosed	
3 August 2026	(Republic of Ireland) Aoibheann Clancy	(Republic of Ireland) Shelbourne	Watford	Undisclosed	
3 August 2026	Ebonie Locke	Birmingham City	(Scotland) Hearts	Loan	
4 August 2026	(Brazil) Kerolin	Manchester City	(Spain) Barcelona	Undisclosed	
4 August 2026	(Republic of Ireland) Naoisha McAloon	Burnley	Liverpool Feds	Loan	
4 August 2026	(Brazil) Gabi Nunes	Aston Villa	(United States) Orlando Pride	Free	
4 August 2026	Emily Taylor-Brown	West Ham United	AFC Wimbledon	Free	
4 August 2026	(Australia) Emily van Egmond	Leicester City	Charlton Athletic	Undisclosed	
5 August 2026	(France) Pauline Peyraud-Magnin	(United States) Denver Summit	Crystal Palace	Loan	
6 August 2026	Harley Bennett	Bristol City	Fulham	Free	
6 August 2026	(France) Chancelle Effa Effa	(France) Le Havre	Birmingham City	Undisclosed	
6 August 2026	Jessie Gale	Arsenal	Newcastle United	Loan	
6 August 2026	Gabby George	Manchester United	Brighton & Hove Albion	Undisclosed	
6 August 2026	(Spain) Natalia Ramos	(Spain) UD Tenerife	Liverpool	Undisclosed	
7 August 2026	(Ghana) Freda Ayisi	Watford	AFC Wimbledon	Free	
7 August 2026	(Poland) Małgorzata Grec	Newcastle United	(Poland) Górnik Łęczna	Free	
7 August 2026	Lily Murphy	Manchester City	Aston Villa	Loan	
7 August 2026	Rachel Williams	Leicester City	Burnley	Undisclosed	
8 August 2026	(Scotland) Chloe Arthur	Crystal Palace	(Scotland) Celtic	Free	
8 August 2026	(Australia) Madison McComasky	(United States) Fort Lauderdale United	Durham	Free	
9 August 2026	(France) Julie Thibaud	Leicester City	(France) Olympique de Marseille	Undisclosed	
10 August 2026	(Jamaica) Shania Hayles	Newcastle United	Nottingham Forest	Free	
10 August 2026	(United States) Jenna Nighswonger	Arsenal	(United States) Bay FC	Undisclosed	
11 August 2026	Libby Bance	Brighton & Hove Albion	Leicester City	Free	
11 August 2026	(Spain) Carla Camacho	Brighton & Hove Albion	(Italy) Lazio	Loan	
11 August 2026	Eleanor Dale	Sunderland	(United States) Tampa Bay Sun	Free	
11 August 2026	(Portugal) Inês Pereira	Everton	(Spain) Deportivo de La Coruña	Undisclosed	
12 August 2026	(Canada) Rylee Foster	(Canada) Halifax Tides	Everton	Undisclosed	
12 August 2026	(Belgium) Kassandra Missipo	(Italy) Sassuolo	Sunderland	Free	
13 August 2026	(Turkey) Selin Cemal	West Ham United	(Scotland) Aberdeen	Loan	
13 August 2026	(United States) Simone Charley	Newcastle United	(United States) Brooklyn FC	Free	
13 August 2026	Hannah Silcock	Liverpool	Everton	Undisclosed	
13 August 2026	(Jamaica) Chantelle Swaby	Leicester City	(Canada) Vancouver Rise	Free	
14 August 2026	(Germany) Mara Alber	Chelsea	(Germany) VfL Wolfsburg	Loan	
14 August 2026	(Denmark) Sofie Lundgaard	Liverpool	(Germany) Eintracht Frankfurt	Undisclosed	
14 August 2026	(Finland) Paulina Nyström	(Sweden) BK Häcken	Leicester City	Undisclosed	
15 August 2026	Olivia Johnson	Brighton & Hove Albion	Lewes	Loan	
16 August 2026	Olivia Carpenter	Watford	Lewes	Free	
16 August 2026	Esta Roberts	Southampton	Portsmouth	Free	
16 August 2026	Maddie Robinson	Burnley	Stockport County	Free	
17 August 2026	Poppy Pritchard	Manchester City	Leicester City	Undisclosed	
18 August 2026	(Wales) Safia Middleton-Patel	Manchester United	Watford	Loan	
18 August 2026	(Japan) Aemu Oyama	Manchester City	(Denmark) HB Køge	Undisclosed	
19 August 2026	Katie Cox	Chelsea	Nottingham Forest	Loan	
19 August 2026	(Scotland) Bayley Hutchison	(Scotland) Hearts	Durham	Undisclosed	
19 August 2026	Grace McEwen	Brighton & Hove Albion	Nottingham Forest	Loan	
19 August 2026	Eva Spencer	Burnley	Hull City	Loan	
20 August 2026	Vera Jones	Chelsea	Watford	Loan	
21 August 2026	Eve Annets	Manchester City	(Scotland) Hibernian	Loan	
21 August 2026	Vivienne Lia	Arsenal	(Germany) Eintracht Frankfurt	Undisclosed	
21 August 2026	(Scotland) Jasmine McQuade	Newcastle United	(Scotland) Hibernian	Loan	
22 August 2026	Louise Griffiths	Sunderland	Wallsend BC	Free	
23 August 2026	Libby Smith	Nottingham Forest	(Scotland) Hibernian	Free	
24 August 2026	Keira Flannery	West Ham United	Charlton Athletic	Undisclosed	
24 August 2026	(Japan) Fūka Tsunoda	Brighton & Hove Albion	Crystal Palace	Loan	
25 August 2026	Araya Dennis	Tottenham Hotspur	Leicester City	Loan	
25 August 2026	(Hungary) Anna Csiki	Tottenham Hotspur	(Portugal) Benfica	Undisclosed	
25 August 2026	(Norway) Tuva Espås	(Norway) Vålerenga	Nottingham Forest	Undisclosed	
25 August 2026	(Republic of Ireland) Tara O'Hanlon	Manchester City	Wolverhampton Wanderers	Undisclosed	
26 August 2026	Emma Brown	(United States) Middle Tennessee Blue Raiders	Durham	Free	
26 August 2026	(Turkey) Halle Houssein	West Ham United	Sheffield United	Loan	
26 August 2026	(France) Tess Laplacette	(France) Olympique de Marseille	Sunderland	Free	
26 August 2026	(New Zealand) Indiah-Paige Riley	Crystal Palace	(New Zealand) Wellington Phoenix	Free	
27 August 2026	Ruby Doe	Ipswich Town	Hashtag United	Free	
27 August 2026	Sophie Harwood	Arsenal	Sheffield United	Loan	
27 August 2026	(Finland) Ilona Walta	(Norway) Molde	Nottingham Forest	Undisclosed	
28 August 2026	(Japan) Suzu Amano	(Sweden) Växjö	Birmingham City	Undisclosed	
28 August 2026	Jorja Fox	Chelsea	Ipswich Town	Undisclosed	
28 August 2026	(Sweden) Monica Jusu Bah	(Sweden) BK Häcken	Manchester United	Undisclosed	
29 August 2026	(Iceland) Linda Líf Boama	(Sweden) Kristianstads	Charlton Athletic	Undisclosed	
30 August 2026	(Nigeria) Rofiat Imuran	London City Lionesses	Aston Villa	Undisclosed	
31 August 2026	Freya Jupp	(United States) Minnesota Golden Gophers	Southampton	Free	
31 August 2026	Jessica Pegram	Brighton & Hove Albion	(Sweden) Hammarby	Loan	
31 August 2026	(Germany) Carlotta Wamser	(Germany) Bayer Leverkusen	Manchester City	Undisclosed	
1 September 2026	(Morocco) Rosella Ayane	Leicester City	Ipswich Town	Free	
1 September 2026	(Denmark) Signe Markvardsen	(Denmark) HB Køge	Bristol City	Undisclosed	
2 September 2026	(Mexico) Rebeca Bernal	(United States) Washington Spirit	Manchester United	Undisclosed	
2 September 2026	(Republic of Ireland) Aoibhe Brennan	(Republic of Ireland) Bohemians	Manchester City	Undisclosed	
2 September 2026	(Haiti) Batcheba Louis	Birmingham City	(France) Fleury 91	Undisclosed	
2 September 2026	Grace Neville	Ipswich Town	Watford	Loan	
3 September 2026	Ava Baker	Birmingham City	Sheffield United	Loan	
3 September 2026	(France) Élisa De Almeida	(France) Paris Saint-Germain	Arsenal	Undisclosed	
3 September 2026	(Nigeria) Comfort Erhabor	Portsmouth	Crystal Palace	Undisclosed	
3 September 2026	Shanade Hopcroft	Birmingham City	Crystal Palace	Free	
3 September 2026	(Wales) Mary McAteer	Charlton Athletic	Ipswich Town	Loan	
3 September 2026	Anna Moorhouse	(United States) Orlando Pride	Manchester City	Loan	
4 September 2026	Ria Bose	West Ham United	Sunderland	Loan	
4 September 2026	Ellie Jones	Everton	Liverpool Feds	Loan	
4 September 2026	(Japan) Saki Kumagai	London City Lionesses	West Ham United	Undisclosed	
4 September 2026	(Australia) Leticia McKenna	(Australia) Melbourne City	Nottingham Forest	Undisclosed	
5 September 2026	(France) Hawa Cissoko	(Italy) Parma	Charlton Athletic	Undisclosed	
5 September 2026	Leighanne Robe	(Mexico) UNAM	Charlton Athletic	Undisclosed	
