= Antonsdóttir =

Antonsdóttir is an Icelandic patronymic name. People known by this name include the following:

- Harpa Karen Antonsdóttir (born 1999), Icelandic football player
- Hildur Antonsdóttir (born 1995), Icelandic footballer
- Kristrún Rut Antonsdóttir (born 1994), Icelandic multi-sport athlete
