= List of English women's football transfers winter 2026–27 =

The 2026–27 English women's football winter transfer window runs from 4 January 2027 to 4 February 2027. Players without a club may be signed at any time, clubs may sign players on loan dependent on their league's regulations, and clubs may sign a goalkeeper on an emergency loan if they have no registered senior goalkeeper available. This list includes transfers featuring at least one club from either the Women's Super League or the Women's Super League 2 that were completed after the end of the summer 2026 transfer window on 3 September and before the end of the 2025—26 winter window.

== Transfers ==
All players and clubs without a flag are English.

Date	Name	Moving from	Moving to	Fee	Ref.
10 September 2026	(Sweden) Cassandra Korhonen	(Denmark) HB Køge	Charlton Athletic	Undisclosed	
13 September 2026	Naomi Williams	Unattached	Watford	Free	
15 September 2026	(Puerto Rico) Caitlin Cosme	Unattached	Crystal Palace	Free	
16 September 2026	Leah Galton	Unattached	Burnley	Free	
17 October 2026	Sophie Hillyerd	London City Lionesses	Sheffield United	Loan	
25 October 2026	(Wales) Soffia Kelly	Aston Villa	Newcastle United	Loan	
7 November 2026	Chloe Sansom	Watford	Swindon Town	Loan	
8 November 2026	Anna Pederson	Charlton Athletic	Newcastle United	Loan	
9 November 2026	(Republic of Ireland) Lia O'Leary	Bristol City	(Cyprus) Peyia Akamas	Loan	
