= Ashley Akpan =

Polish-Nigerian footballer

Personal information
- Full name: Ashley Antoni Akpan
- Date of birth: 6 February 2004 (age 22)
- Place of birth: Warsaw, Poland
- Height: 1.75 m (5 ft 9 in)
- Position: Right-back

Team information
- Current team: Hampton & Richmond Borough
- Number: 21

Youth career
- 2009–2013: Kosa Konstancin
- 2013–2020: Chelsea
- 2021–2022: Wisła Kraków
- 2022–2023: Aldershot Town

Senior career*
Years	Team	Apps	(Gls)
2023–2026	Aldershot Town	17	(1)
2023	→ Hartley Wintney (loan)	6	(0)
2023–2024	→ Gosport Borough (loan)	6	(0)
2026–	Hampton & Richmond Borough	0	(0)

International career
2018	Poland U15		
- * Club domestic league appearances and goals as of 12:34, 16 April 2025 (UTC)

Ashley Antoni Akpan (Polish: [anˈtɔ.ɲi], Ibibio: [àkpán]; born 6 February 2004) is a Polish professional footballer who plays as a right-back for National League South club Hampton & Richmond Borough.

== Club career ==
=== Early career ===
Born in Warsaw, Poland to a Nigerian father and Polish mother, Akpan started his footballing career with Kosa Konstancin at the age of five, spending four years before his family moved to London, England when he was still a child. He joined the academy of Chelsea, where he would go on to play for seven years before his release in 2020.

Prior to his release, he had trialled with Leeds United, and was linked with Fulham in February 2020. He went on to trial with Sunderland in December of the same year. He also played briefly for Walton & Hersham, featuring in one game for the under-18 side in April 2021.

=== Aldershot Town ===
Eventually he returned to Poland, and in August 2021 he signed for Wisła Kraków. He left the club after less than a year, in summer 2022, and returned to England in winter of the same year, signing for Aldershot Town. Akpan went on to sign for the Isthmian League side Hartley Wintney, on a short-term loan in August 2023. Following 10 appearances in all competitions, Akpan was recalled by Aldershot in early October. That same month, he was sent out on loan to Southern League Premier Division South side, Gosport Borough. Akpan signed a new contract with Aldershot at the end of the 2023–24 season.

On 26 August 2024, he made his Aldershot debut during a 4–1 home victory over Oldham Athletic, replacing Kai Corbett in the 56th minute. A few months later, Akpan scored his first goal for the club during their FA Cup fourth qualifying round victory over Bath City, netting the opener, before fellow academy graduate, Maxwell Mullins scored a 98th-minute winner in the 2–1 win. On 14 January 2025, during Aldershot's 2–2 draw with Braintree Town, Akpan sustained a serious knee injury subsequently ending his season early.

On 15 June 2026, it was announced that Akpan would leave Aldershot Town to pursue a new opportunity.

=== Hampton & Richmond Borough ===
On 20 June 2026, Akpan agreed to join National League South side, Hampton & Richmond Borough following his release from Aldershot Town.

== International career ==
Eligible to represent Poland, Nigeria and England, Akpan has represented Poland at under-15 level.

== Career statistics ==
As of match played 14 January 2025

Appearances and goals by club, season and competition
Club	Season	League			FA Cup		EFL Cup		Other		Total	
Club	Season	Division	Apps	Goals	Apps	Goals	Apps	Goals	Apps	Goals	Apps	Goals
Aldershot Town	2023–24	National League	0	0	—		—		—		0	0
Aldershot Town	2024–25	National League	17	1	1	1	—		4 (Note: Two appearances in the National League Cup, two in the FA Trophy)	0	22	2
Aldershot Town	2025–26	National League	0	0	0	0	—		0	0	0	0
Aldershot Town	Total		17	1	1	1	—		4	0	22	2
Hartley Wintney (loan)	2023–24	Isthmian League South Central Division	6	0	2	0	—		2 (Note: Appearances in the FA Trophy)	0	10	0
Gosport Borough (loan)	2023–24	Southern League Premier Division South	6	0	—		—		—		6	0
Hampton & Richmond Borough	2026–27	National League South	0	0	0	0	—		0	0	0	0
Career total			29	1	3	1	0	0	6	0	38	2

== Personal life ==
His sister, Ashanti, is also a footballer, and plays for Newcastle United.
