= Becky Langley =

Women's football coach

Personal information
- Date of birth: 21 April 1995 (age 31)
- Place of birth: Middlesbrough, England

Team information
- Current team: London City Lionesses

Managerial career
- Years: Team
- 2019–2025: Newcastle United W.F.C.
- 2026–: London City Lionesses

Becky Langley (born 21 April 1995) is an English professional football manager and coach who is currently an assistant coach for London City Lionesses.

== Early life and education ==
Langley was born in Middlesbrough and grew up in Ingleby Barwick. She played in Middlesbrough Girls' Centre of Excellence and attended Conyers' School, where she began coaching football at the age of 14. She studied Sports and Exercise Science at Loughborough University, and, as part of her studies, undertook a placement at Nottingham Forest F.C., where she worked with the club's under-18 boys' team.

== Coaching career ==
Langley served as the Head of Women's Football at Northumbria University, where she was responsible for leading the university's performance football squads. Langley was appointed manager of Newcastle United W.F.C. ahead of the 2019–20 season, replacing Victoria Greenwell. She initially held a dual role, managing Newcastle while continuing her position at Northumbria University.

Newcastle lifted their first trophy under Langley's management when they won Bluefin Sport Insurance Women's Cup in 2021. She guided the team to back-to-back promotions, winning the 2022–23 FA Women's National League Division One North and the 2023–24 FA Women's National League Northern Premier Division. In the 2022–23 season, she won the Best Manager award for FA Women's National League Division One North and the FA Women's National League as a whole.

During the 2024–25 season, Langley oversaw the historic first Tyne-Wear derbies in the Women's Championship, which were played in front of record crowds at both the Stadium of Light and St James' Park. In September 2024, she signed a new long-term contract with Newcastle. In October 2025, Newcastle sacked Langley after mixed form saw them win only one of their first six league games that season. She later joined London City Lionesses as an assistant coach in January 2026.
