= Claudia Moan =

English footballer (born 1999)

- Moan with Sunderland in 2023

Personal information
- Date of birth: 6 January 1999 (age 27)
- Position: Goalkeeper

Team information
- Current team: Al-Ahli

Youth career
- 2021–2023: Sunderland

Senior career*
Years	Team	Apps	(Gls)
2023–2024	Sunderland	0	(0)
2024–2026	Newcastle United	22	(0)
2026–	Al-Ahli	0	(0)
- * Club domestic league appearances and goals as of 01:55, 17 January 2026 (UTC)

Claudia Moan (born 6 January 1999) is an English footballer who plays as a goalkeeper for Saudi Women's Premier League team Al-Ahli. She previously played for Sunderland and Newcastle United.

== Club career ==
=== Sunderland ===
Moan graduated from Sunderland's academy and signed her first professional contract in the summer of 2023. In the 2023–24 season, she was awarded the Barclay's Women's Championship Player of the Season Award & the Golden Glove having only conceding 18 goals in 22 matches, and recorded 10 clean sheets.

=== Newcastle United ===
On 9 July 2024, Moan signed for Newcastle United. In June 2026, Newcastle announced that Moan would depart the club at the end of the 2025–26 WSL 2 season.

=== Al-Ahli ===
Following her departure from Newcastle, Moan joined Saudi Women's Premier League side Al-Ahli.

== Career statistics ==
As of match played 21 December 2025

Club	Season	League			National cup		League cup		Total	
Club	Season	Division	Apps	Goals	Apps	Goals	Apps	Goals	Apps	Goals
Sunderland	2021–22	Women's Championship	0	0			2	0	2	0
Sunderland	2022–23	Women's Championship	0	0	1	0	1	0	2	0
Sunderland	2023–24	Women's Championship	0	0	1	0	1	0	2	0
Sunderland	Total		0	0	2	0	4	0	6	0
Newcastle United	2024–25	Women's Championship	20	0	3	0	1	0	24	0
Newcastle United	2025–26	Women's Super League 2	2	0	0	0	2	0	4	0
Newcastle United	Total		22	0	3	0	3	0	28	0
Career total			22	0	5	0	7	0	34	0
