= Oona Sevenius =

Finnish footballer (born 2004)

Personal information
- Full name: Oona Ilona Sevenius
- Date of birth: 28 April 2004 (age 22)
- Place of birth: Nurmijärvi, Finland
- Height: 1.70 m (5 ft 7 in)
- Position: Forward

Team information
- Current team: Newcastle United
- Number: 20

Youth career
- NJS

Senior career*
Years	Team	Apps	(Gls)
2018–2019	NJS	28	(26)
2020–2021	PK-35 Vantaa	38	(16)
2022	HJK	23	(16)
2023–2025	AC Milan	3	(0)
2023–2024	→ Como (loan)	24	(4)
2025	Rosengård	13	(3)
2025–	Newcastle United	21	(3)

International career
2023–	Finland	39	(9)
- * Club domestic league appearances and goals as of 15 October 2026

Oona Ilona Sevenius (Finnish: ['oːnɑ 'ilonɑ 'seʋenius] born 28 April 2004) is a Finnish professional footballer who plays as a striker for WSL 2 club Newcastle United. She is seen as one of the most promising Finnish players.

== Career ==
Sevenius made her league debut for AC Milan against Como on 26 February 2023, coming on in the 86th minute for Kamila Dubcová.

In January 2023, Sevenius received an offer from AC Milan, and received advice from Tuija Hyyrynen and Nora Heroum about moving to Italy before joining the club. During her first season with AC Milan, she mainly played with the U19s, but also trained with the senior team.

On 28 July 2023, Sevenius signed a three-year contract with AC Milan until June 2026, and also joined Como on loan.

On 23 January 2025, Sevenius moved to FC Rosengård in Damallsvenskan.

On 29 August 2025, Sevenius was announced at Newcastle United on a permanent transfer.

== International career ==
On 4 July 2023, it was announced that Sevenius had been called up to the Finland national team for the first time.

On 21 February 2024, Sevenius scored a hat trick for Finland national team in a 4–0 friendly win against Philippines.

On 19 June 2025, Sevenius was called up to the Finland squad for the UEFA Women's Euro 2025.

== Personal life ==
Sevenius' role model is Zlatan Ibrahimović, she has a photo taken of them together, whilst they were both at AC Milan.

== Career statistics ==
As of 3 July 2025

Appearances and goals by club, season and competition
Club	Season	League			National cup (Note: Includes Finnish Women's Cup and Coppa Italia (women))		Europe		League Cup		Total	
Club	Season	Division	Apps	Goals	Apps	Goals	Apps	Goals	Apps	Goals	Apps	Goals
NJS	2018	Naisten Kakkonen	13	7	–		–		–		13	7
NJS	2019	Naisten Kakkonen	15	19	2	2	–		–		17	21
NJS	Total		28	26	2	2	0	0	–		30	28
PK-35 Vantaa	2020	Kansallinen Liiga	16	3	4	1	–		–		20	4
PK-35 Vantaa	2021	Kansallinen Liiga	22	13	5	5	–		–		27	18
PK-35 Vantaa	Total		38	16	9	6	0	0	–		47	22
HJK	2022	Kansallinen Liiga	23	16	6	2	–		–		29	18
AC Milan	2022–23	Serie A Femminile	2	0	0	0	–		–		2	0
AC Milan	2023–24	Serie A Femminile	0	0	0	0	–		–		0	0
AC Milan	2024–25	Serie A Femminile	1	0	0	0	–		–		1	0
AC Milan	Total		3	0	0	0	0	0	–		3	0
Como (loan)	2023–24	Serie A Femminile	24	4	–		–		–		24	4
Rosengård	2025	Damallsvenskan	13	3	4	2	0	0	–		17	5
Newcastle United	2025–26	WSL 2	11	2	1	0	–		3	0	15	2
Newcastle United	Total		11	2	1	0	–		3	0	15	2
Career total			140	67	22	12	0	0	9	8	165	79

=== International ===
As of 13 October 2026

Appearances and goals by national team and year
National team	Year	Apps	Goals
Finland	2023	7	1
Finland	2024	13	4
Finland	2025	12	2
Finland	2026	5	2
Total		39	9

=== International goals ===
No.	Date	Venue	Opponent	Score	Result	Competition
1.	30 November 2023	Veritas Stadion, Turku, Finland	Romania	5–0	6–0	2023–24 UEFA Women's Nations League
2.	21 February 2024	Pinatar Arena, San Pedro del Pinatar, Spain	Philippines	1–0	4–0	Friendly
3.	21 February 2024	Pinatar Arena, San Pedro del Pinatar, Spain	Philippines	3–0	4–0	Friendly
4.	21 February 2024	Pinatar Arena, San Pedro del Pinatar, Spain	Philippines	4–0	4–0	Friendly
5.	27 February 2024	Pinatar Arena, San Pedro del Pinatar, Spain	Scotland	1–0	1–1 (5–4 p)	2024 Pinatar Cup
6.	6 July 2025	Stade de Tourbillon, Sion, Switzerland	Norway	1–1	1–2	UEFA Women's Euro 2025
7.	1 December 2025	Estadio El Pamar, Sanlúcar de Barrameda, Spain	Belgium	1–1	1–1	Friendly
8.	7 March 2026	Helsinki Football Stadium, Helsinki, Finland	Latvia	3–0	3–1	2027 FIFA Women's World Cup qualification
9.	5 June 2026	Štadión pod Zoborom, Nitra, Slovakia	Slovakia	3–0	4–0	2027 FIFA Women's World Cup qualification

== Honours ==
- Football Association of Finland: The Promising Young Player of the Year 2022
