= Ashanti Akpan =

English footballer (born 2005)

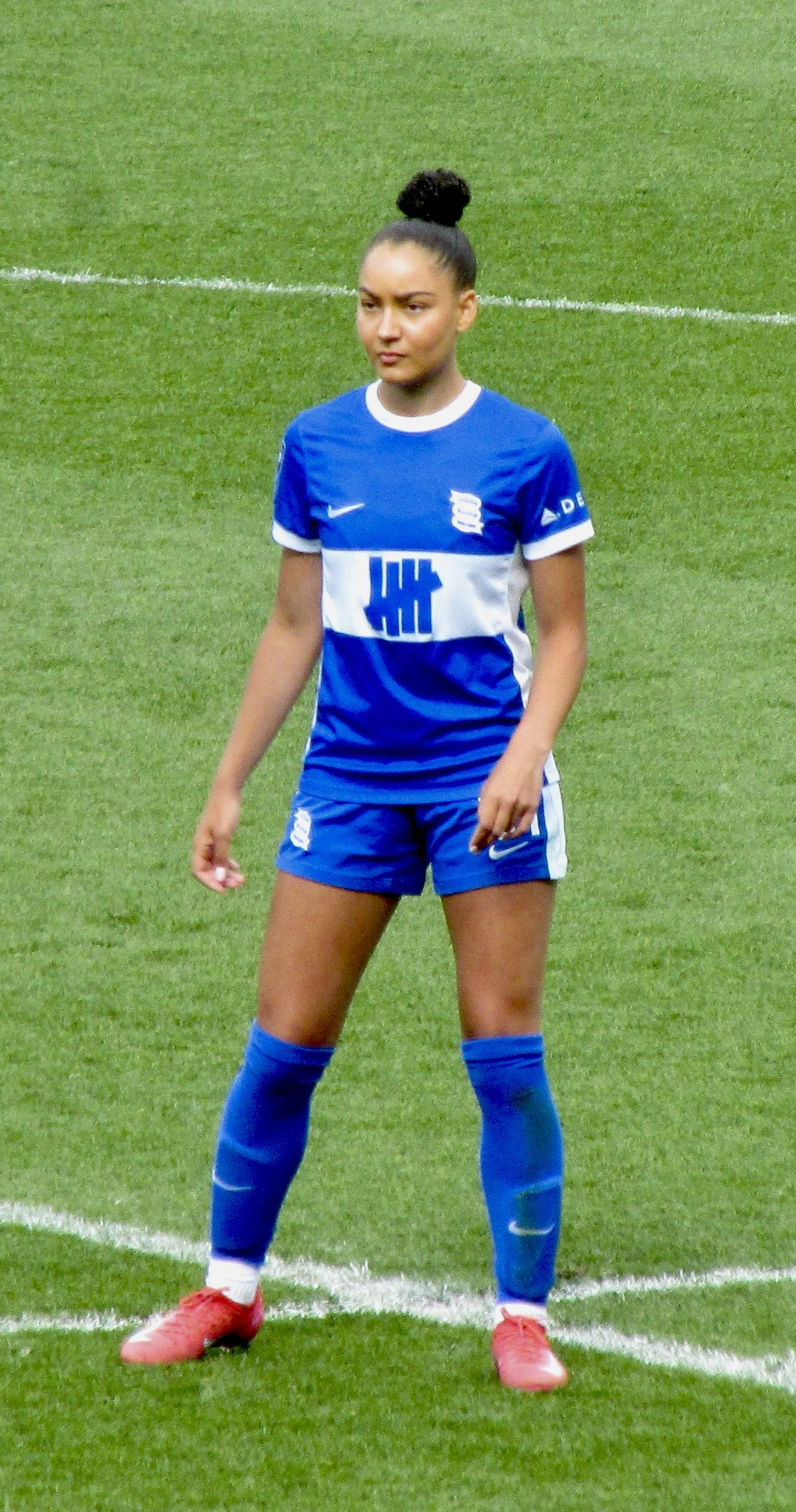
- Akpan with Birmingham City in 2025

Personal information
- Full name: Ashanti Gabriella Akpan
- Date of birth: 24 November 2005 (age 20)
- Place of birth: Warsaw, Poland
- Height: 1.67 m (5 ft 6 in)
- Position: Midfielder

Team information
- Current team: Newcastle United
- Number: 24

Youth career
- Kosa Konstancin
- 2013–2024: Chelsea

Senior career*
Years	Team	Apps	(Gls)
2022–2026	Chelsea	0	(0)
2024–2025	→ Birmingham City (loan)	13	(0)
2025–2026	→ Southampton (loan)	9	(0)
2026–	Newcastle United	2	(0)

International career
- England U16
- England U17
- England U18
2023–2024	England U19	16	(0)
2025	England U23	3	(0)
- * Club domestic league appearances and goals as of 9 September 2026

Ashanti Gabriella Akpan (Ibibio: [aˈʃã̀ntì àkpán]; born 24 November 2005) is a professional footballer who plays as a midfielder for Women's Super League 2 club Newcastle United. Born in Poland, she represented England at international youth level.

== Club career ==
Akpan joined the Chelsea Academy in August 2013, aged seven. With the Academy squad, she won the FA Youth Cup in 2021–22 and the FA WSL Academy Cup in 2022–23.

She was involved with the Chelsea senior squad for the first time when she was named on the bench in a 2–0 UEFA Women's Champions League win over Real Madrid Femenino on 23 November 2022, though she did not feature. Her debut came in a 3–1 Women's FA Cup win against Reading on 19 March 2023, when she came on as a second-half substitute for Sophie Ingle. In December of the same year, Akpan signed her first professional contract with the club until the summer of 2025, with the option to extend by a further year. The option was exercised in June 2025, when Akpan extended her contract for another year.

Akpan spent the first part of the 2025–26 season on loan at Women's Super League 2 side Southampton. She was set to spend the entire season at Southampton, but the deal was terminated at the halfway point in January 2026. In the same month, she left Chelsea and joined Newcastle United on a permanent deal for an undisclosed fee.

== International career ==
Internationally, Akpan is eligible to play for Poland through her place of birth, for Nigeria through her Nigerian father, and for England. She was capped for the latter at all youth levels from under-15 to under-23. With the under-19s, she participated at the 2024 UEFA Women's Under-19 Championship, where England reached the semi-finals after being eliminated by eventual champions Spain.

Following an injury to Maisie Symonds, Akpan was called up to the England under-23 squad in October 2024 for the first time. She made her debut six months later on 3 April 2025, coming on as a second-half substitute for Ruby Grant in a 2–1 defeat against Spain.

== Personal life ==
Akpan was born in Warsaw to a Polish mother and Nigerian father, and later moved to England with her family. She is the sister of fellow professional footballer Ashley Akpan.

== Career statistics ==
=== Club ===
As of 26 June 2025

Appearances and goals by club, season and competition
Club	Season	League			National cup (Note: Includes Women's FA Cup)		League cup (Note: Includes Women's League Cup)		Continental		Total	
Club	Season	Division	Apps	Goals	Apps	Goals	Apps	Goals	Apps	Goals	Apps	Goals
Chelsea	2022–23	Women's Super League	0	0	1	0	0	0	0	0	1	0
Chelsea	2023–24	Women's Super League	0	0	0	0	0	0	0	0	0	0
Chelsea	Total		0	0	1	0	0	0	0	0	1	0
Birmingham City (loan)	2024–25	Women's Championship	13	0	0	0	2	0	0	0	15	0
Career total			13	0	1	0	2	0	0	0	16	0
