= Elysia Boddy =

English footballer (born 2004)

Personal information
- Date of birth: 20 January 2004 (age 22)
- Place of birth: Teesside, England
- Height: 1.70 m (5 ft 7 in)
- Position: Midfielder

Team information
- Current team: Newcastle United
- Number: 6

Youth career
- Marton
- Teesside
- Middlesbrough

Senior career*
Years	Team	Apps	(Gls)
2020–2022	Middlesbrough	21	(2)
2022	Leicester City	2	(0)
2022–2023	Bristol City	0	(0)
2023–	Newcastle United	31	(1)

International career^{‡}
2021–2024	England U19	6	(1)
2023–	England U23	1	(0)
- * Club domestic league appearances and goals as of 23:14, 21 December 2025 (UTC) ‡ National team caps and goals as of 19:14, 4 May 2025 (UTC)

Elysia Boddy (born 20 January 2004) is an English professional footballer who plays as a midfielder for Women's Super League 2 club Newcastle United and the England under-23 national team.

== Early career ==
Aged four, Bobby began playing football with Marton boys team, prior to moving to Teesside Girls Regional Talent Club. At 16 years old she joined Middlesbrough, followed by Leicester City.

== Club career ==
On 5 February 2022, Women's Super League club Leicester City signed Boddy for the remainder of the 2021–22 season. She made her debut aged 18 against West Ham on 13 February 2022.

On 14 July 2022, Boddy signed for Women's Championship club Bristol City for the 2022–23 season, helping the team to win the league and gain promotion to the Women's Super League.

On 12 May 2023, she left Bristol City by mutual agreement, having made 11 appearances in all competitions for City. A month later, she signed for National League North side Newcastle United for the 2023–24 season. Described as a key player for the magpies, with her two game absence due to a knee injury negatively effecting the teams performance that season, Boddy helped the Magpies to gain promotion to the Women's Championship.

On 13 August 2024, Boddy scored against AC Milan in a 2–2 cup clash at St James' Park, where Newcastle prevailed on penalties. On 14 September 2024, she signed a new three-year contract with United ahead of the 2024–25 season, stating the club matches her career ambitions.

In January 2025, Newcastle United won both the North East Football Writers' Young Player of the Year Awards for 2024, with Boddy, aged 20, winning the women's award alongside Alexander Isak winning the men's.

== International career ==
According to Boddy, she has represented England since under-14 youth level.

On 17 February 2022, as a half-time substitute and on her debut, Boddy scored her first goal for the England under-19 team against Finland, the second goal in a 4–0 victory as part of an international tournament.

In November 2024, she received her first call up to the England under-23 team, making her debut for the under-23s as a 62nd minute substitute, in a goalless draw against Norway on 28 November.

== Style of play ==
Boddy plays on the right of midfield, or in a number 10 position, and has been described as a persistent tackler and an attacking midfielder.

== Honours ==
Bristol City F.C.

- Women's Championship: 2022–23

Newcastle United F.C.

- National League North: 2023–24

Individual

- North East Football Writers': Young Women’s Player of the Year 2024
