= Casi Gregson =

Welsh footballer (born 2007)

Personal information
- Full name: Casi Marie Gregson
- Date of birth: 3 November 2007 (age 19)
- Place of birth: Lampeter, Wales
- Position: Forward

Team information
- Current team: Newcastle United
- Number: 45

Youth career
- Lampeter
- West Wales
- FAW Academi South

Senior career*
Years	Team	Apps	(Gls)
2024-25	Gwalia United	37	(8)
2026-	Newcastle United	1	(0)

International career^{‡}
2022-24	Wales U17	12	(3)
2025-26	Wales U19	9	(1)
2026-	Wales	1	(0)
- * Club domestic league appearances and goals as of 16-10-26 ‡ National team caps and goals as of 16-10-26

Casi Marie Gregson (born 3 November 2007) is a Welsh footballer who plays for Newcastle United and Wales.

== Early life ==
Gregson was born in Lampeter, Ceredigion. Her father Lyndon played football professionally at Swansea and at age-group level for Wales.

Gregson attended Ysgol Gynradd Carreg Hirfaen and Ysgol Bro Pedr and played football for local grassroots side Lampeter before moving to FAW Academi South in Pontypridd. She was also Welsh schools champion over 60m and 200m.

== Club career ==
Gregson signed for Gwalia United in 2024 who at the time were in the FA Women's National League Premier Division South. She made 37 appearances, scoring 8 goals before leaving the club in December 2025.

In February 2026 Gregson signed for Newcastle United in the Women's Super League 2. In September 2026, she made her first first-team appearance from the club, coming off the bench in the 63rd minute of a WSL Players Cup tie against Aston Villa.

In October 2026 she signed her first professional contract with the club.

== International career ==
Gregson represented Wales at under-15, under-16, under-17 and under-19 levels.

She was called up to the senior camp for Wales' World Cup qualification play-offs against Albania. She was brought on for her first cap in the 86th minute of the second leg at Parc y Scarlets, Llanelli, replacing Mared Griffiths.

== Personal life ==
Gregson is a first language Welsh speaker.
