= Charlotte Wardlaw =

Association football player (born 2003)

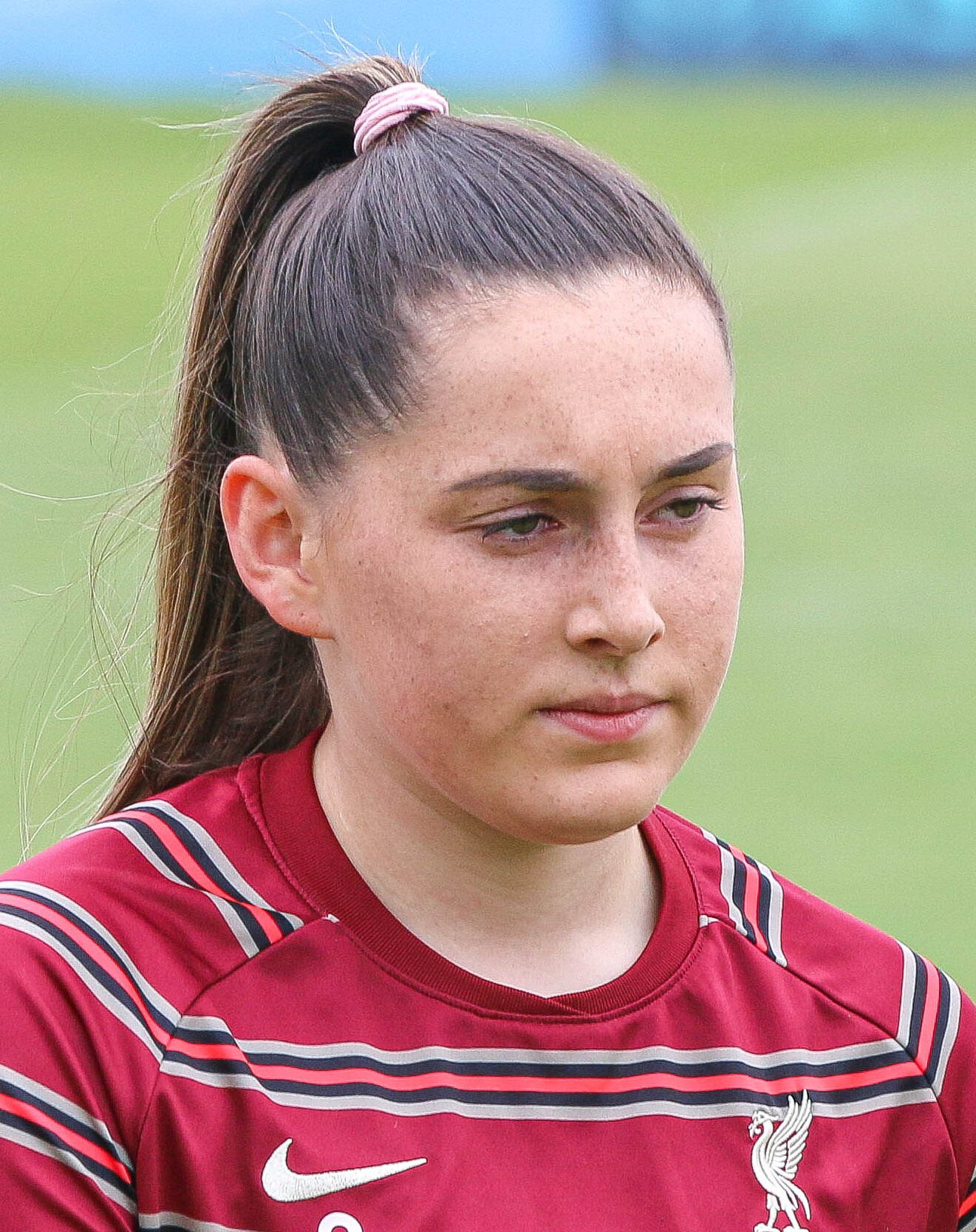
- Wardlaw in 2022

Personal information
- Full name: Charlotte Rose Wardlaw
- Date of birth: 20 February 2003 (age 23)
- Place of birth: Carshalton, England
- Positions: Defender; defensive midfielder

Team information
- Current team: Newcastle United
- Number: 2

Youth career
- Carshalton Athletic
- –2018: Millwall Lionesses
- 2018–2019: Chelsea

Senior career*
Years	Team	Apps	(Gls)
2019–2025	Chelsea	0	(0)
2021–2022	→ Liverpool (loan)	18	(1)
2022–2023	→ Liverpool (loan)	4	(0)
2023	→ Lewes (loan)	12	(0)
2023–2024	→ Glasgow City (loan)	28	(2)
2024–2025	→ Sheffield United (loan)	9	(0)
2025–	Newcastle United	30	(0)

International career^{‡}
2017–2018	England U15	4	(0)
2019	England U16	1	(0)
2019	England U17	4	(0)
2021–2022	England U19	8	(0)
2022	England U23	1	(0)
- * Club domestic league appearances and goals as of 6 January 2026 ‡ National team caps and goals as of 15:06, 19 October 2022 (UTC)

Charlotte Rose Wardlaw (born 20 February 2003) is a footballer who plays as a defender or defensive midfielder for Women's Super League 2 club Newcastle United. Born in England, she represented that nation at youth international levels but in 2025 switched to play for Scotland national team.

== Club career ==
Wardlaw started playing football at the age of six, for Carshalton Athletic. At the age of 13, she joined the Millwall Lionesses Academy, and aged 15, she joined Chelsea Academy. At the age of 16, Wardlaw made her senior debut for Chelsea in a 2018–19 FA Women's League Cup against Tottenham Hotspur. Chelsea won the match 5–1. She also made appearances in Chelsea's 2019–20 Women's FA Cup match against Charlton Athletic, and their 2020–21 Women's FA Cup match against London City Lionesses.

In June 2021, Wardlaw signed a two-year professional contract with Chelsea. It was her first professional contract. In August 2021, she joined FA Women's Championship club Liverpool on loan for the remainder of the season. She was Liverpool's eighth signing of the season. She scored her first Liverpool goal as they beat Sheffield United 2–0 in October 2021, and also scored in Liverpool's 2021–22 Women's FA Cup fourth round match against Lincoln City. In September 2022, Wardlaw was re-loaned to Liverpool for the 2022–23 season. She returned to Chelsea in January 2023. A few weeks later, she was loaned out again, this time to Women's Championship side, Lewes. At the beginning of the next season she was loaned to Scottish club Glasgow City for the season. The following season saw her loaned to Championship side Sheffield United before being recalled in January 2025.

On 17 January 2025, Wardlaw signed a permanent deal with Championship club Newcastle United.

== International career ==
Wardlaw has captained the England women's under-15, under-17 and under-19 teams. In 2017, she was part of the England under-15s team that beat Wales under-15s 7–0. She captained England under-17s in 2020 UEFA Women's Under-17 Championship qualification matches. She was in the England squad for the 2022 UEFA Women's Under-19 Championship. In October 2022, she played for the England under-23 team in a match against Sweden.

On 20 March 2025, Wardlaw's request to switch international allegiance to Scotland was approved by FIFA. Seven days later, she was called up to the Scotland national under-23 team.

== Personal life ==
Wardlaw is in a relationship with fellow women's footballer Hannah Robinson.
