= Małgorzata Grec =

Polish footballer (born 1999)

Personal information
- Date of birth: 11 September 1999 (age 27)
- Place of birth: Wrocław, Poland
- Height: 1.83 m (6 ft 0 in)
- Position: Defender

Team information
- Current team: Górnik Łęczna

Youth career
- KŚ AZS Wrocław

Senior career*
Years	Team	Apps	(Gls)
2014–2018	KŚ AZS Wrocław		
2018–2021	Górnik Łęczna	48	(5)
2021–2022	SKN St. Pölten	8	(0)
2022–2025	Dijon	54	(1)
2025–2026	Newcastle United	3	(0)
2026–	Górnik Łęczna	0	(0)

International career^{‡}
2015–2016	Poland U17	4	(2)
2016–2018	Poland U19	5	(0)
2018–	Poland	13	(1)
- * Club domestic league appearances and goals as of 15:37, 29 July 2026 (UTC) ‡ National team caps and goals as of 21 November 2024

Małgorzata Grec (born 11 September 1999) is a Polish professional footballer who plays as a defender for Ekstraliga club Górnik Łęczna.

== Club career ==
Grec's senior career started for Ekstraliga club KŚ AZS Wrocław. In 2018, she moved to fellow Ekstraliga side Górnik Łęczna. In 2021, Grec joined Austrian side SKN St. Pölten. After winning the domestic double during the 2021–22 season, in July 2022 Grec signed with French club Dijon.

On 30 July 2025, Grec signed for English second tier club Newcastle United. In July 2026, the club announced that she had left the club by mutual consent.

On 7 August 2026, Grec rejoined her former club Górnik Łęczna.

== International career ==
Grec capped for the Poland national team at senior level during the UEFA Women's Euro 2022 qualifying.

== Career statistics ==
=== International ===
As of match played 31 October 2023

Appearances and goals by national team and year
National team	Year	Apps	Goals
Poland	2018	2	0
Poland	2019	1	1
Poland	2020	2	0
Poland	2022	2	0
Poland	2023	6	0
Total		13	1

Scores and results list Poland's goal tally first, score column indicates score after each Grec goal.

List of international goals scored by Małgorzata Grec
No.	Date	Venue	Opponent	Score	Result	Competition
1	3 October 2019	Dimotiko Gipedo Agia Napa, Ayia Napa, Cyprus	Cyprus	4–0	5–1	Friendly

== Honours ==
Górnik Łęczna

- Ekstraliga: 2018–19, 2019–20
- Polish Cup: 2019–20

St. Polten

- ÖFB Frauen Bundesliga: 2021–22
- ÖFB Frauen Cup: 2021–22
