= Anna Tamminen =

Finnish footballer (born 1994)

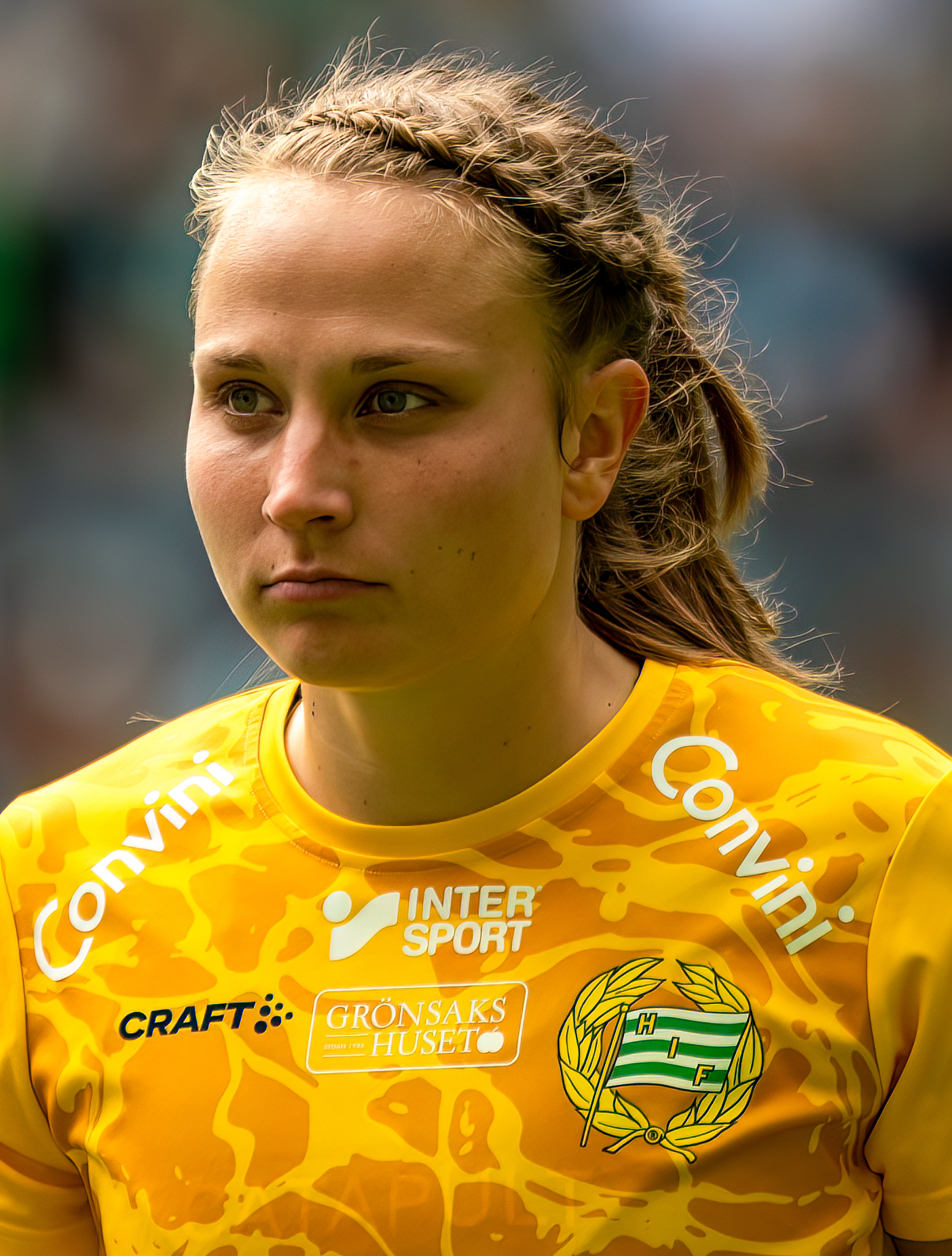
- Tamminen with Hammarby in 2022

Personal information
- Full name: Anna Reetta Alisa Tamminen
- Date of birth: 30 October 1994 (age 32)
- Place of birth: Turku, Finland
- Height: 1.78 m (5 ft 10 in)
- Position: Goalkeeper

Team information
- Current team: Newcastle United
- Number: 1

Youth career
- Turku Nappulaliiga
- Pyrkivä Turku
- Turun Weikot

Senior career*
Years	Team	Apps	(Gls)
2015–2016	NiceFutis	30	(0)
2017	Hovås Billdal IF	26	(0)
2018–2020	Åland United	46	(0)
2021–2025	Hammarby IF	96	(0)
2025–	Newcastle United	12	(0)

International career^{‡}
2019–	Finland	11	(0)
- * Club domestic league appearances and goals as of 6 January 2026 ‡ National team caps and goals as of 13 November 2023

Anna Reetta Alisa Tamminen (born 30 October 1994) is a Finnish footballer who plays as a goalkeeper for Women's Super League 2 club Newcastle United and the Finland women's national football team. She previously played for NiceFutis, Hovås Billdal IF, Åland United, and Hammarby IF, where she was named The Most Valuable Player of the 2023 Damallsvenskan.

== Club career ==
=== NiceFutis and Hovås Billdal ===
Born and raised in Turku, Tamminen played youth football with several local clubs. In 2015, she started her senior career with NiceFutis in the Naisten Liiga, the domestic top tier. After two seasons with the club, she moved to Hovås Billdal IF in the Swedish second division Elitettan. Tamminen appeared in all 26 league fixtures in 2017, but was unable to save her team from a relegation.

=== Åland United ===
On 10 January 2018, Tamminen returned to Finland, moving to Åland United. For three consecutive years, in 2018, 2019 and 2020, Tamminen won the award of Goalkeeper of the Year in the Finnish league. In 2020, Åland United were crowned Finnish champions through winning the Kansallinen Liiga. The same year, the club also won the Finnish Women's Cup, through a 2–1 win over Tikkurilan Palloseura in the final.

=== Hammarby IF ===
On 2 December 2020, Tamminen signed a one-year contract with Hammarby IF in Damallsvenskan. She made 22 appearances in the league in 2021, leading her side to a 7th place in the table.

On 17 November 2021, Tamminen signed a new two-year deal with the club. In 2022, Tamminen made 23 appearances, as Hammarby finished 5th in the Damallsvenskan table. She kept 12 clean sheets throughout the season, the most in the whole league.

On 6 June 2023, Hammarby won the 2022–23 Svenska Cupen. Tamminen appeared in the final, that ended in a 3–0 win at home against BK Häcken. On 5 July the same year, Tamminen signed a new three-year contract with the club, running until the summer of 2026. The club also won the 2023 Damallsvenskan, claiming its second Swedish championship after 38 years. Throughout the season, Tamminen set a new league record when the side did not concede a goal for 757 straight minutes, eventually ending the campaign with 13 clean sheets. After the season, she vas voted Hammarby Player of the Year by the supporters of the club. Tamminen was also awarded the Damallsvenskan prizes Goalkeeper of the Year and Most Valuable Player of the Year. She finished her four years with the Swedish side having made 116 appearances.

=== Newcastle United ===
On 5 September 2024, Tamminen signed for Women's Super League 2 club Newcastle United.

== International career ==
Tamminen made her senior debut at 2019 Cyprus Cup and also played in the 2020 Cyprus Cup. She was a substitute goalkeeper in the first four games of qualifying for the 2023 World Cup. On June 9, 2022, she was nominated for the European Championship finals.

On 19 June 2025, Tamminen was called up to the Finland squad for the UEFA Women's Euro 2025.

== Personal life ==
Tamminen has been in a relationship with Spanish footballer Rosita Herreros. In April 2023, they faced criticism when they kissed each other on the pitch after a Damallsvenskan match where their teams faced.

== Honours ==
=== Club ===
Åland United

- Kansallinen Liiga: 2020
- Finnish Women's Cup: 2020

Hammarby IF

- Svenska Cupen: 2022–23
- Damallsvenskan: 2023

=== Individual ===
- Kansallinen Liiga Goalkeeper of the Year: 2018, 2019, 2020
- Hammarby IF Player of the Year: 2023
- Damallsvenskan Goalkeeper of the Year: 2023
- Damallsvenskan Most Valuable Player of the Year: 2023
