= Harpa Karen Antonsdóttir =

Icelandic footballer (born 1999)

Personal information
- Full name: Harpa Karen Antonsdóttir
- Date of birth: 25 July 1999 (age 27)
- Place of birth: Iceland

Senior career*
Years	Team	Apps	(Gls)
2014	Valur	2	(0)
2016	→ KH (loan)	11	(2)
2017	KR	5	(0)
2018–present	Haukar	7	(0)

International career^{‡}
2015	Iceland U16	6	(1)
2015–2016	Iceland U17	3	(0)
- * Club domestic league appearances and goals as of 24 April 2021 ‡ National team caps and goals as of 24 April 2021

Harpa Karen Antonsdóttir (born 25 July 1999) is an Icelandic football player who plays for Icelandic club Haukar.

== Club career ==
Harpa came up through the junior programs of Valur and appeared in two Úrvalsdeild kvenna matches in 2014. During the 2016 season, she played for KH in the second-tier 1. deild kvenna where she netted 2 goals in 11 matches. The following season, she returned to the Úrvalsdeild with KR before signing with Haukar in February 2018. In 2019, Harpa was diagnosed with cancer after suffering from debilitating headaches for three years. Over the next three months she went six chemotherapy treatments. She finished her last treatment on 31 December the same year. She returned to the court in a practice game against KR in May 2020, playing the last 15 minutes.

== National team career ==
Harpa has played for the Icelandic U16 team and U17 team.
