= Kayla Rendell =

English footballer (born 2001)

Personal information
- Full name: Kayla Shea Rendell
- Date of birth: 29 June 2001 (age 25)
- Height: 1.76 m (5 ft 9 in)
- Position: Goalkeeper

Team information
- Current team: Newcastle United (on loan from Manchester United)

Youth career
- Southampton

Senior career*
Years	Team	Apps	(Gls)
2019–2025	Southampton (Note: Domestic stats include 38 National League appearance in 2019–20 (8), 2020–21 (4), and 2021–22 (26).)	79	(0)
2025–	Manchester United	0	(0)
2026–	→ Newcastle United (loan)	0	(0)

International career^{‡}
2017–2018	England U17	5	(0)
2018	England U18	1	(0)
2019	England U19	1	(0)
2022–2025	England U23	7	(0)
2025–	England	0	(0)
- * Club domestic league appearances and goals as of 12:50, 11 January 2025 (UTC) ‡ National team caps and goals as of 13 May 2025

Kayla Shea Rendell (born 29 June 2001) is an English professional footballer who plays as a goalkeeper for Women's Super League 2 club Newcastle United, on loan from WSL club Manchester United. A product of the Southampton academy, she has represented England internationally from under-17 to under-23 youth level.

== Early life ==
Rendell began playing football at the age of 6 with Merely, in Poole, joined the Dorset Centre of Excellence aged 8, and later played for Merley Cobham Girls. Prior to becoming a full-time footballer, Rendell worked at Screwfix while playing non-league football for Southampton part-time.

== Club career ==
=== Southampton ===
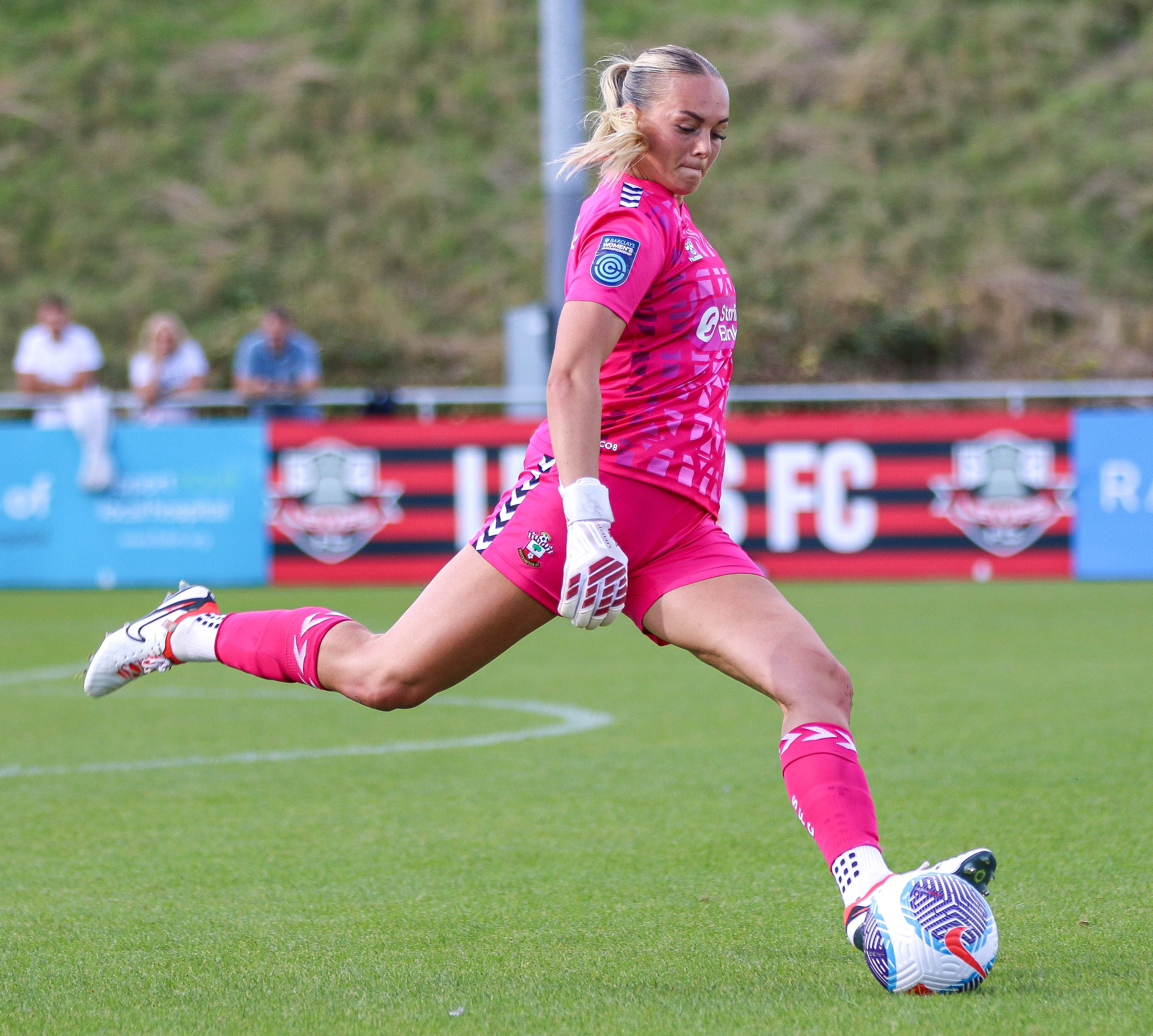
Rendell playing in goal for Southampton against Lewes in 2023.

Rendell joined Southampton aged 15, playing in the Region Talent Club under-16s team.

On 27 February 2022, in the 2021–22 FA Cup, she scored a dramatic equalising goal from a corner against Ipswich Town in extra time, which was later awarded as Goal of the Season.

In the 2022–23 season, Rendell was awarded Women's Championship Player of the Month for October 2022, having kept three clean sheets in the month in 1–0 victories. In May 2023, she was nominated for Women's Championship Save of the Season for her fingertip save against Sunderland.

In June 2023, Rendell was awarded Southampton Women's Player of the Season by fans, featuring in all but one of the Saints games, keeping nine clean sheets, and making a total of 89 saves. She extended her contract with Southampton until 2025.

Rendell didn't make a league appearance during the first half of the 2024–25 season, and was instead replaced by fellow youth international Fran Stenson.

=== Manchester United ===
On 11 January 2025, Rendell signed for Women's Super League club Manchester United for an undisclosed fee, and was subsequently named as the new number 1 goalkeeper.

==== Loan to Newcastle United ====
For the 2026–27 season, Rendell joined WSL2 club Newcastle United on a season-long loan.

== International career ==
=== Youth ===
Rendell has represented England at every youth level from under-16 to under-23.

On 16 March 2018, Rendell was named as part of the England under-17 squad for 2018 U-17 Championship qualification. She made her debut on 28 March 2018 against Switzerland, keeping a clean sheet in the 4–0 win. In May 2018, in the final tournament, Rendell kept clean sheets in victories over Italy and Germany, with England beaten 2–1 by Finland in the World Cup play-off.

On 30 September 2022, Rendell was called up to the England under-23 squad for fixtures against Norway and Sweden, where she would be an unused substitute, in favour of Emily Ramsey.

On 20 February 2023, Rendell made her debut for the England U23 team, as the starting goalkeeper in a 4–1 victory over Belgium. On 30 October 2023, with the under-23s, she made a series of saves to keep a clean sheet against Portugal in a 2–0 win.

=== Senior ===
In April 2024, Rendell received her first call-up to the senior England team for their Euro 2025 qualifiers. In May, she was named to the standby list for Euro qualifiers, but later withdrew from the squad due to an ankle injury.

== Honours ==
External video
- Southampton Women's Goal of the Season, 2021–22 FA Cup fifth round vs Ipswich, February 2022

Manchester United

- Women's FA Cup runner-up: 2024–25
- Women's League Cup runner-up: 2025–26

Individual

- Southampton Women's Goal of the Season: 2021–22
- Women's Championship Player of the Month: October 2022
- Southampton Women's Player of the Season: 2022–23
