= Hanna Németh =

Hungarian footballer (born 1998)

Personal information
- Date of birth: 17 September 1998 (age 28)
- Place of birth: Diósd, Hungary
- Height: 1.80 m (5 ft 11 in)
- Position: Defender

Team information
- Current team: Newcastle United
- Number: 17

Youth career
- 2011–2013: Diósdi TC
- 2013–2014: Ferencváros
- 2014–2017: Kóka FNLA

College career
| Years | Team | Apps | (Gls) |
| 2017–2021 | Indiana Hoosiers | 54 | (1) |

Senior career*
| Years | Team | Apps | (Gls) |
| 2014–2017 | Kóka FNLA | 39 | (3) |
| 2014–2015 | Hungária Viktória (futsal) | | |
| 2015–2016 | Ferencvárosi László (futsal) | | |
| 2018 | Indy Saints FC | | |
| 2021–2022 | Ferencváros | 8 | (0) |
| 2022–2026 | Werder Bremen | 79 | (0) |
| 2026– | Newcastle United | 2 | (0) |

International career^{‡}
| 2014–2015 | Hungary U17 | 6 | (0) |
| 2015–2017 | Hungary U19 | 10 | (0) |
| 2020– | Hungary | 29 | (1) |
- * Club domestic league appearances and goals as of 21 November 2026 ‡ National team caps and goals as of 1 March 2026 (UTC)

Hanna Németh (born 17 September 1998) is a Hungarian footballer who plays as a defender for Women's Super League 2 club Newcastle United and the Hungary women's national team.

== Career ==
On 10 July 2026, Németh was announced at Newcastle United.
