= Mollie Lambert =

English footballer

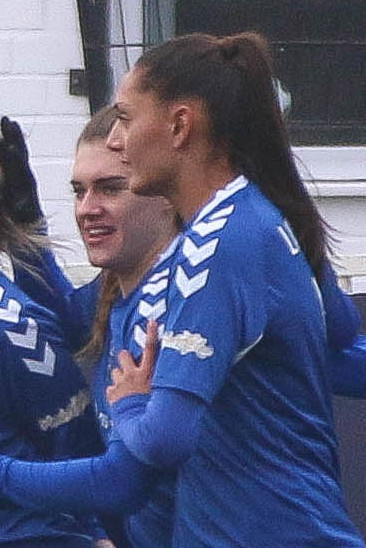
- Mollie Lambert playing for Durham January 2021

Personal information
- Full name: Mollie Lambert
- Date of birth: 14 June 1998 (age 28)
- Place of birth: Hartlepool, England
- Position: Central midfielder

Team information
- Current team: Newcastle United

Youth career
- Middlesbrough
- 2013–2015: Sunderland
- 2015–2016: Newcastle United

Senior career*
Years	Team	Apps	(Gls)
2015–2016	Newcastle United	24	(4)
2016–2020	Sunderland	54	(6)
2020–2026	Durham	79	(5)
2026–	Newcastle United	0	(0)
- * Club domestic league appearances and goals as of 3 march 2024

Mollie Lambert (born 14 June 1998) is an English footballer who currently plays as a central midfielder for Women's Super League 2 club Newcastle.

== Club career ==
=== Newcastle United, 2015–2016 ===
Lambert joined Newcastle United during the club's summer trials in July 2015, beginning her spell at the club in the development side. Joining the club as a striker, she was moved back into central midfield. She stepped up to the first team on 4 October 2015, making her debut as a second half substitute in a 7–2 win against Peterborough Northern Star in the FA Women's National League Plate. She made her full debut in the club's next game, starting in a 0–5 defeat against Preston North End LFC on 25 October 2015. She scored two goals in 21 games in the 2015–16 season.

Lambert was named club captain for the 2016–17 season, first captaining the side against Nottingham Forest on the opening day of the season in August 2016. She scored twice in eight games before November 2016, when she departed to join FA Women's Super League club Sunderland.

=== Sunderland AFC, 2016–2020 ===
Lambert returned to Sunderland to play with the development team in 2016. She made her senior debut for the club on 30 April 2017 when she replaced Stephanie Roche in the 71st minute of a 0–0 draw with Arsenal during the FA WSL 1 Spring Series. She made a total of seven out of eight possible appearances during the tournament.

The 2017–18 season was a breakthrough year for the midfielder, playing 17 times in all competitions under Melanie Copeland. Her first goal for Sunderland came in a 13–0 FA Cup fourth round win against Brighouse Town, with Lambert netting a 15 minute hat-trick in the second-half.

Lambert was one of four first team players to remain with the club after their demotion to the third tier FA Women's National League for the 2018–19 season. She scored her first goals of the season on 9 September 2018, in a 3–2 win away to Huddersfield Town, including the late winner.

=== Durham ===
In July 2020, Lambert moved to FA Women's Championship team Durham. In January 2025, Lambert was announced as the 2024 North East Football Writers’ Association women's player of the year. Lambert was shortlisted for the 2024-25 Women's Championship player of the season award.

=== Newcastle United ===
On 24 July 2026, Lambert was announced at Newcastle United.

== Career statistics ==
=== Club ===
As of 3 march 2024.

Appearances and goals by club, season and competition
Club	Season	League			FA Cup		League Cup (Note: Includes the FA Women's National League Cup and FA Women's League Cup)		Total	
Club	Season	Division	Apps	Goals	Apps	Goals	Apps	Goals	Apps	Goals
Newcastle United	2015–16	WPL Northern	17	2	2	0	2	0	21	2
Newcastle United	2016–17	WPL Northern	7	2	0	0	1	0	8	2
Newcastle United	Total		24	4	2	0	3	0	29	4
Sunderland	2017	WSL 1	7	0	—		—		7	0
Sunderland	2017–18	WSL 1	12	0	2	3	3	0	17	3
Sunderland	2018–19	WNL North	23	6	1	0	3	0	27	6
Sunderland	2019–20	WNL North	12	0	4	0	5	0	21	0
Sunderland	Total		54	6	7	3	11	0	72	9
Durham	2020–21	Championship	18	1	0	0	3	0	21	1
Durham	2021-22	Championship	22	2	2	0	4	0	28	2
Durham	2022-23	Championship	22	1	2	1	4	0	28	3
Durham	2023-24	Championship	17	1	1	0	4	1	22	2
Durham	Total		79	5	5	1	15	1	99	8
Career total			157	15	14	4	29	1	200	21
