= Katie Bradley =

English footballer (born 2001)

Personal information
- Full name: Katie Elizabeth Bradley
- Date of birth: 25 December 2001 (age 24)
- Place of birth: Greater Manchester, England
- Position: Midfielder

Team information
- Current team: Newcastle United

Youth career
- 2011–2016: Manchester United
- 2016–2019: Manchester City

College career
Years	Team	Apps	(Gls)
2020–2023	UCF Knights		

Senior career*
Years	Team	Apps	(Gls)
2024	Blackburn Rovers		
2024–2026	Charlton Athletic	41	(11)
2026–	Newcastle United	0	(0)

International career^{‡}
2018	England U17	0	(0)
2019–2021	England U19	2	(1)
2022	England U23	0	(0)
- * Club domestic league appearances and goals as of 11:45, 18 July 2026 (UTC) ‡ National team caps and goals as of 23:47, 11 April 2022 (UTC)

Katie Elizabeth Bradley (born 25 December 2001) is an English professional footballer who plays as a midfielder for Newcastle United in the Women's Super League 2. She has represented England at the youth level.

== Early life ==
Born in Egerton, Greater Manchester, Bradley attended Turton High School in Bromley Cross. She played in the Manchester United academy from ages 10–15, before moving to the Manchester City academy, where she played for the following three years. As part of the Manchester City Under-16 squad, Bradley won the Women's FA Youth Cup in 2018.

== College career ==
Bradley joined the UCF Knights in 2020, though her first season was delayed and played in Spring 2021 due to the COVID-19 pandemic. Bradley scored on her debut in the season opener. As a freshman, Bradley earned a place on the American Athletic Conference All-Rookie Team. In her junior year, Bradley appeared in all 18 of the Knight's games in the season, scoring two free kicks. In her senior year, Bradley started in all 18 games during the season, registering seven assists and four goals. She also received 2023 Fall Academic All-Big 12 First Team honors.

== Club career ==
=== Blackburn Rovers ===
On 1 January 2024, it was reported that Bradley had been in talks with then-Women's Super League side Bristol City while still in with the UCF Knights. Having completed her college career, Bradley returned to England, signing a permanent contract with Blackburn Rovers in January 2024.

=== Charlton Athletic ===
Bradley joined Charlton Athletic on 10 July 2024. Bradley scored her first goals for Charlton in the 82nd and 85th minute of their match against Durham on 22 September 2024, winning the match 2–1. She scored Charlton's only goal in a 2–1 League Cup defeat to Tottenham on 2 October 2024. Bradley scored a penalty on 2 March 2025, helping Charlton to a 1–1 draw against London City Lionesses. On 4 May 2025, Bradley scored in a 2–0 win over Southampton, securing a third-place league finish for the 2024–25 season.

In September 2025, Bradley was sent off in the 89th minute of Charlton's opening match of the 2025–26 season after receiving two yellow cards. Bradley scored from the penalty spot to help Charlton to a 2–0 win over Newcastle United on 25 January 2026, as the club continued their uneaten run in the WSL 2. In July 2026, it was announced that Bradley had departed Charlton upon the expiration of her contract.

=== Newcastle United ===
On 27 July 2026, Bradley signed for Newcastle United.

== International career ==
Bradley is eligible to play for Scotland through her grandfather, but chose to represent England at international youth level.

She was part of the England youth national teams which competed in the 2018 UEFA U-17 Championship, the UEFA U-19 Championship, and has been part of the U-17, U-18, and U-19 English youth national teams.

== In popular culture ==
In December 2025, Bradley became one of the first WSL 2 players to feature among a new range of Panini stickers.
