= Gemma Evans (footballer) =

Welsh footballer (born 1996)

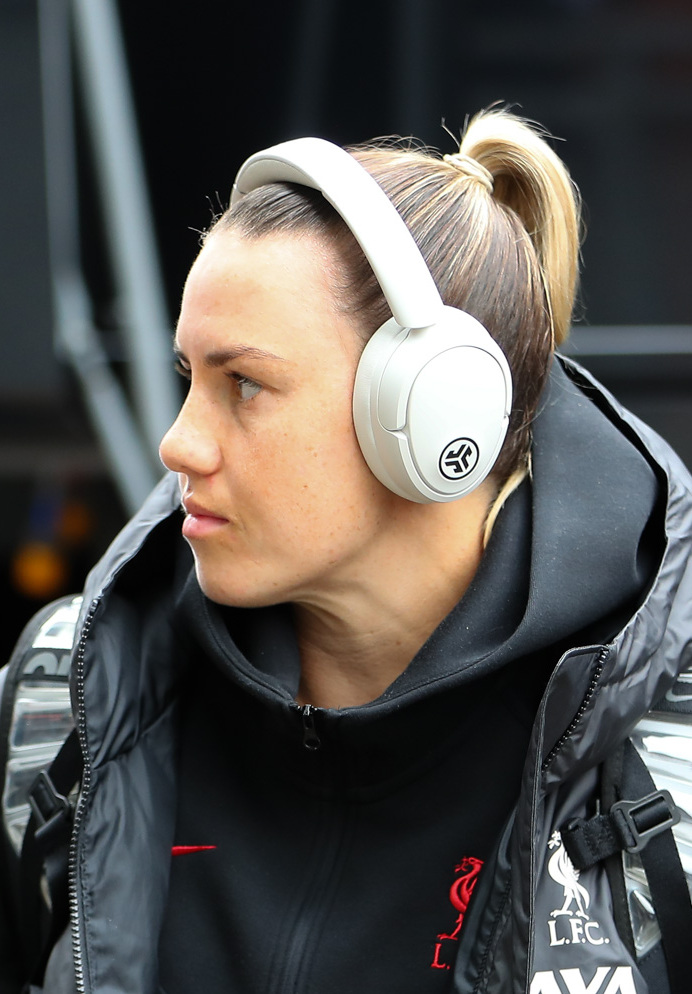
- Evans with Liverpool in 2024

Personal information
- Full name: Gemma Jayne Evans
- Date of birth: 1 August 1996 (age 30)
- Place of birth: Gelli, Rhondda, Wales
- Height: 5 ft 7 in (1.70 m)
- Position: Defender

Team information
- Current team: Newcastle United
- Number: 23

Youth career
- Ton & Gelli
- Ferndale Fillies
- Cambrian
- Valleys United
- Port Talbot Town

Senior career*
Years	Team	Apps	(Gls)
2015–2017	Cardiff City	52	(4)
2017–2018	Yeovil Town	22	(1)
2018–2021	Bristol City	51	(2)
2021–2023	Reading	41	(0)
2023–2024	Manchester United	12	(0)
2024–2026	Liverpool	27	(0)
2026–	Newcastle United	0	(0)

International career^{‡}
2014	Wales U19	3	(1)
2016–	Wales	92	(2)
- * Club domestic league appearances and goals as of 17:10, 16 May 2026 (UTC) ‡ National team caps and goals as of 15:53, 18 October 2026 (UTC)

Gemma Jayne Evans (born 1 August 1996) is a Welsh professional footballer who plays as a defender for Women's Super League 2 club Newcastle United and the Wales national team.

== Early life ==
Evans was born and raised in Gelli, Rhondda. She starting playing football at age 10 for a local team named Ton & Gelli. At 13, she switched to playing for an all-girls team, Ferndale Fillies which was later renamed Cambrian and then subsequently changed to Valleys United. She then went on to play for Port Talbot Town Ladies for two years.

== Club career ==
=== Cardiff and Yeovil ===
Evans played for Cardiff City L.F.C. from 2015 to 2017. She joined FA WSL 1 side Yeovil Town on 6 September 2017, alongside Welsh international teammate Chloe Lloyd. She made her Yeovil debut in a 1–0 FA WSL1 defeat away to Bristol City on 30 September 2017.

=== Bristol City ===
Evans signed for FA WSL side Bristol City on 20 July 2018, making her debut on 19 August 2018 in an FA Women's League Cup tie against Leicester City and going on to spend three years with the club, scoring twice in 66 appearances; Bristol were relegated to the FA Women's Championship at the end of her final season.

=== Reading ===
She then signed for FA WSL side Reading F.C. Women on a free transfer on 5 July 2021. Evans made her Royals debut on the opening day of the 2021–22 FA WSL season, in a 2–0 defeat to Manchester United at Leigh Sports Village on 3 September 2021. She scored her only goal for the club in a 3–1 League Cup win over Crystal Palace on 17 November 2021.

After 51 appearances for Reading over two seasons, Evans was released at the end of the 2022–23 FA WSL season, in which Reading finished in 12th place and were relegated.

=== Manchester United ===
On 6 July 2023, Evans signed for Manchester United.

She made her United debut on 15 October 2023, in a 1–1 WSL draw with Leicester City. On 12 May 2024, Evans was an unused substitute as the club won its first FA Women's Cup, and its first major trophy, with a 4–0 win over Spurs at Wembley Stadium.

=== Liverpool ===
On 16 August 2024, Evans joined Liverpool. She made her debut for the Reds on 22 September 2024 in a 1–1 draw with Leicester City.

=== Newcastle United ===
Evans signed for FA WSL2 side Newcastle United on 3 July 2026.

== International career ==
Evans made her debut for Wales in a 2–0 defeat to Norway during UEFA Women's Euro 2017 qualifying on 7 June 2016. She won her fiftieth cap on 21 February 2023, in a 0–0 draw with Iceland in the 2023 Pinatar Cup.

In June 2025, Evans was named in Wales' squad for UEFA Women's Euro 2025, and has 77 Cymru caps. During the match against the Republic of Ireland, she lost her tooth during a tackle. She has donated the tooth to the Welsh football museum in Wrexham.

== Personal life ==
Evans holds a degree from the University of South Wales.

== Career statistics ==
=== Club ===
As of match played 16 May 2026

Appearances and goals by club, season and competition
Club	Season	League			National Cup		League Cup		Continental		Total	
Club	Season	Division	Apps	Goals	Apps	Goals	Apps	Goals	Apps	Goals	Apps	Goals
Yeovil Town	2017–18	Women's Super League	18	0	0	0	4	1	—		22	1
Bristol City	2018–19	Women's Super League	19	1	2	0	4	0	—		25	1
Bristol City	2019–20	Women's Super League	12	0	2	0	5	0	—		19	0
Bristol City	2020–21	Women's Super League	20	1	1	0	6	1	—		27	1
Bristol City	Total		51	2	5	0	15	1	0	0	71	2
Reading	2021–22	Women's Super League	22	0	2	0	3	1	—		27	1
Reading	2022–23	Women's Super League	19	0	3	0	3	0	—		25	0
Reading	Total		41	0	5	0	6	1	0	0	52	1
Manchester United	2023–24	Women's Super League	12	0	3	0	4	0	0	0	19	0
Liverpool	2024–25	Women's Super League	16	0	4	0	2	0	—		22	0
Liverpool	2025–26	Women's Super League	11	0	2	1	4	1	—		17	2
Liverpool	Total		27	0	6	1	6	1	0	0	39	2
Career total			149	2	19	1	35	4	0	0	203	6

=== International ===
As of match played 13 October 2026

Appearances and goals by national team and year
National team	Year	Apps	Goals
Wales	2016	3	0
Wales	2017	9	0
Wales	2018	4	0
Wales	2019	8	0
Wales	2020	3	0
Wales	2021	9	1
Wales	2022	12	0
Wales	2023	8	0
Wales	2024	11	0
Wales	2025	13	0
Wales	2026	8	0
Total		92	1

List of international goals scored by Gemma Evans
No.	Date	Venue	Opponent	Score	Result	Competition
1	18 September 2021	Parc y Scarlets, Llanelli, Wales	Kazakhstan	5–0	6–0	2023 FIFA Women's World Cup qualification
2	9 June 2026	Cardiff City Stadium, Cardiff, Wales	Czech Republic	2–1	3–1	2027 FIFA Women's World Cup qualification

== Honours ==
Manchester United

- Women's FA Cup: 2023–24
