= Dee Bradley =

Irish footballer (born 1996)

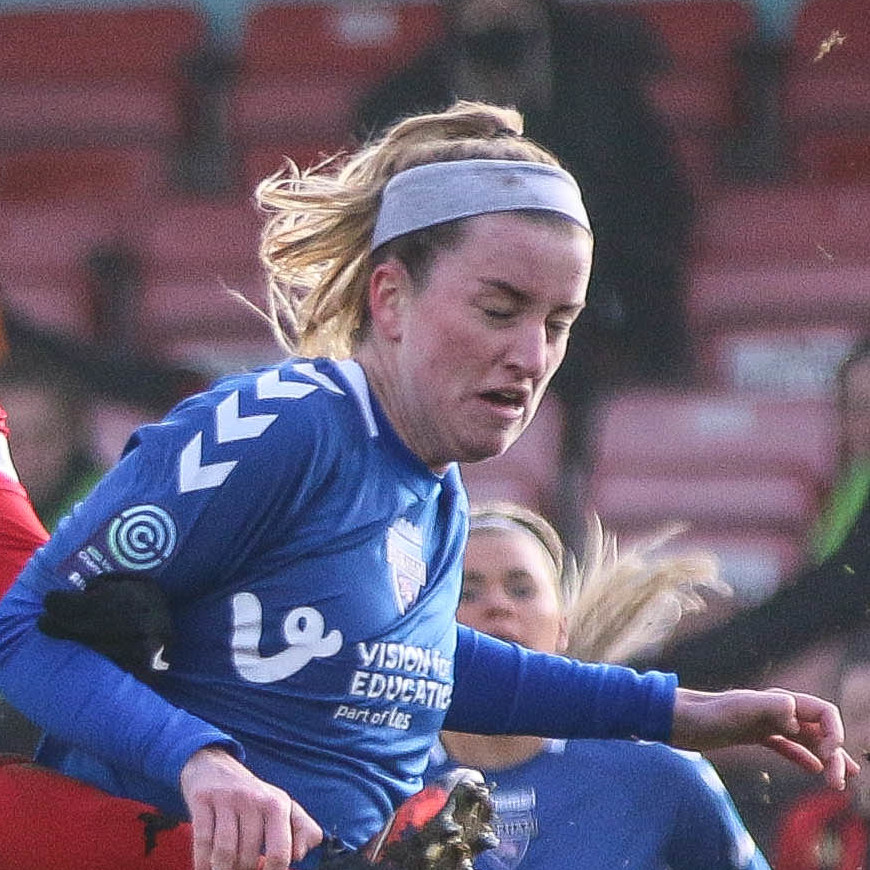

Personal information
- Full name: Deirdre Bradley
- Date of birth: 12 August 1996 (age 30)
- Place of birth: Newton Township, Pennsylvania
- Height: 1.78 m (5 ft 10 in)
- Positions: Midfielder; defender

Team information
- Current team: Durham

College career
Years	Team	Apps	(Gls)
2014–2018	Old Dominion Monarchs		

Senior career*
Years	Team	Apps	(Gls)
2020–2025	Durham	63	(5)
2025–2026	Burnley	9	(0)
2026	→ Durham (loan)	6	(1)
2026–	Durham	0	(0)
- * Club domestic league appearances and goals as of 4 May 2026

Deirdre Bradley (born 12 August 1996) is an Irish professional footballer who plays as a midfielder or defender for Women's Super League 2 club Durham, and the Republic of Ireland national team.

Bradley played college football with the Old Dominion Monarchs. before starting her professional career with Durham. After five years at the club she would join Burnley, before rejoining Durham on loan and later permanently in 2026.

== Early life ==
Bradley was born in Newton Township, Pennsylvania to a father from Letterkenny and a mother from Cork. She has three brothers. She attended Marpie Newtown High school.

== College career ==
Bradley played college soccer for the Old Dominion Monarchs for four years. In her last year she was named team captain. However she would miss most of the year with an injury.

== Club career ==
=== Durham ===
On 10 January 2021, Bradley signed for Women's Championship side Durham. Durham would go on to finish that season in 2nd place, one spot off promotion.

In March 2022, Bradley signed a new deal with Durham. In August 2023, she signed a new 2-year deal with the club.

=== Burnley ===
On 4 August 2025, Bradley joined Women's National League North side Burnley. She made her debut for the club on the opening day of the 2025–26 season against Middlesbrough.

==== Durham (loan) ====
On 1 February 2026, Bradley returned to Women's Super League 2 club Durham on a six-month loan deal. On 5 April 2026, Bradley made her 100th appearance for the club.

=== Return to Durham ===
On 10 July 2026, Bradley rejoined Durham on a permanent basis.

== International career ==
In June 2025, Bradley was called up to the Republic of Ireland national team for the first time, for friendlies against her birth country of the United States.

== Career statistics ==
=== Club ===
As of match played 2 May 2026

Appearances and goals by club, season and competition
Club	Season	League			National cup (Note: Includes Women's FA Cup)		League cup (Note: Includes Women's League Cup)		Total	
Club	Season	Division	Apps	Goals	Apps	Goals	Apps	Goals	Apps	Goals
Durham	2020–21	Women's Championship	0	0	1	0	1	0	2	0
Durham	2021–22	Women's Championship	19	3	3	0	4	1	26	4
Durham	2022–23	Women's Championship	20	2	3	0	4	0	27	2
Durham	2023–24	Women's Championship	18	0	2	0	4	0	24	0
Durham	2024–25	Women's Championship	6	0	1	0	4	0	11	0
Durham	Total		63	5	10	0	17	1	90	6
Burnley	2025–26	National League North	9	0	1	0	0	0	10	0
Durham (loan)	2025–26	WSL 2	6	1	0	0	0	0	6	1
Durham	2026–27	WSL 2	0	0	0	0	0	0	0	0
Career total			88	6	11	0	17	1	106	7
