= Hildur Antonsdóttir =

Icelandic footballer (born 1995)

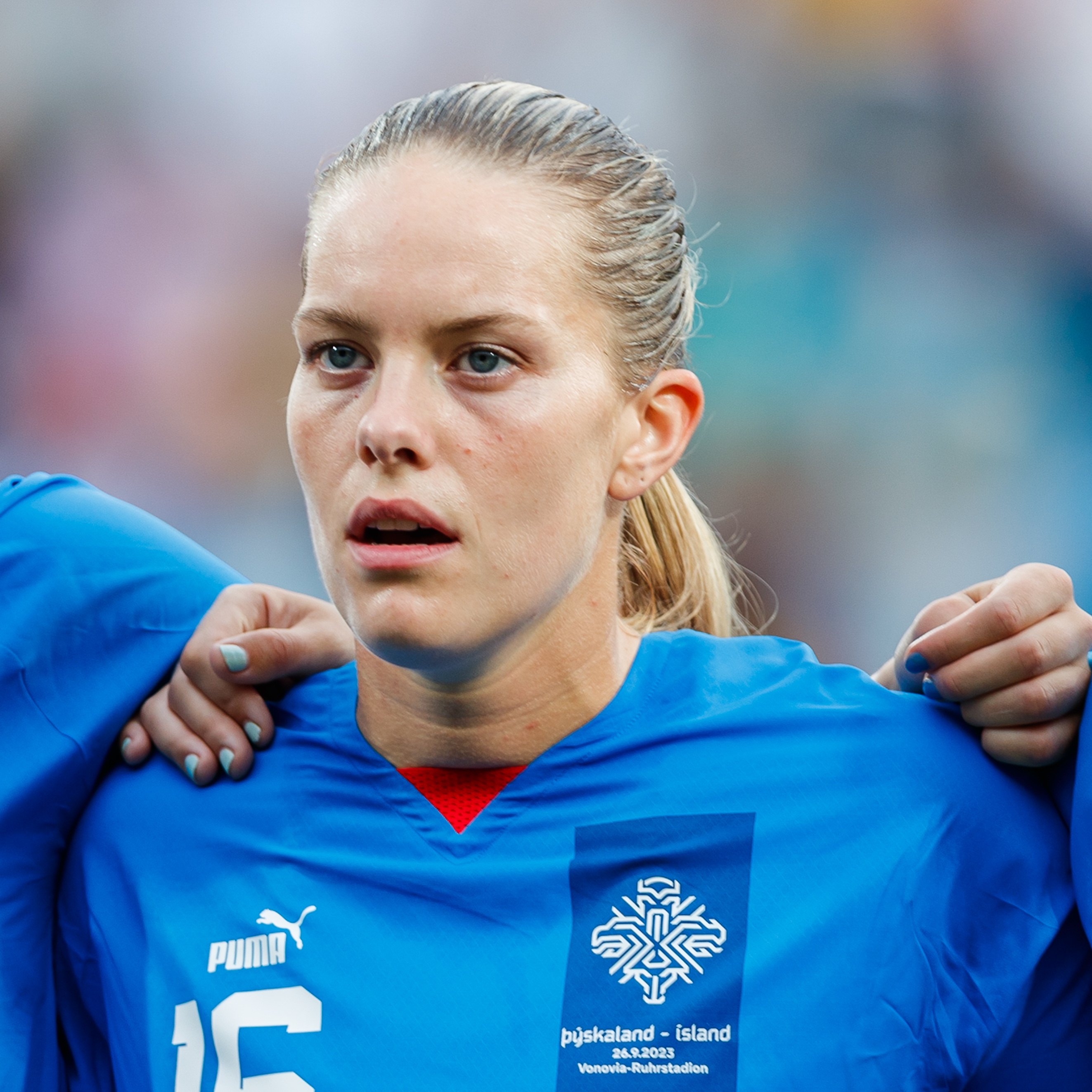
- Hildur with Iceland in 2023

Personal information
- Date of birth: 18 September 1995 (age 31)
- Place of birth: Reykjavík, Iceland
- Position: Midfielder

Team information
- Current team: Newcastle United
- Number: 16

Senior career*
Years	Team	Apps	(Gls)
2011–2016	Valur	80	(12)
2016–2022	Breiðablik	57	(9)
2022–2024	Fortuna Sittard	39	(5)
2024–2026	Madrid CFF	53	(3)
2026–	Newcastle United	5	(1)

International career^{‡}
2010–2011	Iceland U16	9	(2)
2011	Iceland U17	7	(3)
2011–2014	Iceland U19	23	(2)
2015	Iceland U23	1	(0)
2020–	Iceland	38	(2)
- * Club domestic league appearances and goals as of 31 October 2026 ‡ National team caps and goals as of 11 October 2026

Hildur Antonsdóttir (Icelandic: [ˈhɪltʏr ˈantʰɔnsˌtouːhtɪr]; born 18 September 1995) is an Icelandic footballer who plays as a midfielder for Women's Super League 2 (WSL 2) club Newcastle United and the Iceland national team.

Born in Reykjavík, Antonsdóttir began her career at Besta deild kvenna club Valur before moving to Breiðablik. She then played overseas for Vrouwen Eredivisie club Fortuna Sittard and Liga F club Madrid CFF before joining WSL 2 side Newcastle United. At international level, she represented Iceland at under-16, under-17, under-19 and under-23 level before débuting for the senior national team in 2020.

== Club career ==
Hildur started her career with Valur but left the team midway through the 2016 season and joined Breiðablik. In May 2018, she was loaned to HK/Víkingur but two months later she was recalled and finished the season with Breiðablik. In June 2020, Hildur tore her anterior cruciate ligament, resulting in her missing the rest of the season. In 2022 she moves to Fortuna Sittard in the Netherlands, a new team in the Dutch Eredivisie Vrouwen. She signed a contract for two seasons.

On 8 July 2026, Hildur signed for Newcastle United Women.

== International career ==
Hildur has been capped for the Iceland national team. She received her first international call up in 2020, after Alexandra Jóhannsdóttir had to be withdrawn from the squad due to an injury.

On 13 June 2025, Hildur was called up to the Iceland squad for the UEFA Women's Euro 2025.

== Personal life ==
Hildur is the daughter of Ragnheiður Víkingsdóttir who played football with Valur and the Icelandic national football team. Her sister, Heiða Dröfn Antonsdóttir, played 92 games in the Úrvalsdeild from 2009 to 2016.

== International goals ==
No.	Date	Venue	Opponent	Score	Result	Competition
1.	1 December 2023	Cardiff City Stadium, Cardiff, Wales	Wales	1–0	2–0	2023–24 UEFA Women's Nations League
2.	4 June 2024	Laugardalsvöllur, Reykjavík, Iceland	Austria	2–1	2–1	UEFA Women's Euro 2025 qualifying
