= Newcastle United W.F.C. =

Women's association football club in England

Newcastle United Women
- Full name: Newcastle United Women's Football Club
- Nickname: The Magpies
- Founded: 1989; 37 years ago as Newcastle United Ladies
- Ground: Gateshead International Stadium
- Capacity: 11,800
- Owners: Public Investment Fund (85%); RB Sports & Media (15%)
- Manager: Tanya Oxtoby
- League: Women's Super League 2
- 2025–26: WSL 2, 6th of 12
- Website: newcastleunited.com/women
Home colours	Away colours	Third colours

Newcastle United Women's Football Club is a professional English women's football club, affiliated with Newcastle United F.C. They were founded in 1989 and are based at the Newcastle United Academy Training Centre, Benton, Newcastle upon Tyne, and play their home matches at Gateshead International Stadium, Gateshead. They are currently members of the Women's Super League 2.

In the summer of 2016, they became officially affiliated with Newcastle United F.C, operating independently with the support of the Newcastle United Foundation. In August 2022, restructuring meant that the women's team was brought under the complete ownership of Newcastle United, with plans to transition to full-time football.

== History ==
The club was formed in 1989 and known at the time as Newcastle United Ladies. In 1996, the team played Manchester United at Wembley, prior to a men's charity match between the two sides.

By 2001, the club was well established in the top half of the Northern Combination League, and through its partnership with Newcastle City Council's Football Development Scheme, a five-year plan was put in place to reach the FA Women's Premier League. Those five years saw the club achieve major success on and off the field, winning the Northumberland FA Senior Cup on a record five consecutive occasions.

The club gained promotion to the Women's National League North in 2003 off the back of conceding only 16 goals in 18 games.

During the 2005–06 season, the club reached the Women's FA Cup quarter finals for the first time ever, losing to Liverpool 9–8 on penalties following a 2–2 draw.

In August 2013 the club announced a deal with Wonga.com, who become the club's principal sponsor for the 2013–14 season. This was the first time an official Newcastle United sponsor had also committed to the women's team, demonstrating the growing importance of women's football.

The club achieved their highest ever finish in the third tier of Women's football during the 2015–16 season, finishing 9th under manager Thomas Butler. They also reached the semi-final of the FAWPL Plate, where they were defeated 0–2 by Enfield Town.

Ahead of the 2016–17 season, the club was renamed Newcastle United Women's Football Club. Newcastle United Women also became part of the Newcastle United Foundation, a registered charity arm of Newcastle United F.C., while remaining independently owned.

Newcastle United played their first game at St. James' Park on 1 May 2022, attracting a crowd of 22,134. The team won 4–0 against Alnwick Town Ladies.

Following promotion to the third tier at the end of the 2022–23 season, the club turned professional, becoming the first professional side to compete in the English women's third tier. Under the guidance of head of women's football Su Cumming and head coach at the time Becky Langley, a development squad was also introduced to help provide players with a talent pathway into the senior team.

Newcastle United were promoted to the Women's Championship (WSL 2) as champions of the 2023–24 National League, after 10–0 win against Huddersfield Town on 14 April 2024.

On 10 August 2024, Newcastle United maintained their 100% win record at St. James' Park with a 4-3 penalty shoot-out victory against AC Milan which saw them win the Sela Cup in front of 37,000 fans.

Ahead of the 2025–26 Women's Super League 2 season, and with ambitions of earning promotion to the Women's Super League (WSL), Newcastle United moved to Gateshead International Stadium, which has a natural grass pitch and complies with WSL regulations.

== Current squad ==
As of 25 September 2026

Note: Flags indicate national team as defined under FIFA eligibility rules; some limited exceptions apply. Players may hold more than one non-FIFA nationality.

No.	Pos.	Nation	Player
1	GK	FIN	Anna Tamminen
2	DF	SCO	Charlotte Wardlaw
3	DF	ENG	Demi Stokes
4	MF	ENG	Jordan Nobbs
5	DF	ENG	Jemma Purfield
6	MF	ENG	Elysia Boddy
7	MF	USA	Morgan Gautrat
8	MF	ENG	Emma Kelly
9	FW	SCO	Kathleen McGovern
10	MF	ENG	Mollie Lambert
11	MF	SCO	Freya Gregory
12	GK	ENG	Kayla Rendell (on loan from Manchester United)
14	FW	SWE	Emilia Larsson
15	DF	HUN	Hanna Németh
16	MF	ISL	Hildur Antonsdóttir
17	FW	SCO	Martha Thomas

No.	Pos.	Nation	Player
18	DF	AUS	Kaitlyn Torpey
19	MF	ENG	Katie Bradley
20	FW	FIN	Oona Sevenius
22	DF	WAL	Lois Joel
23	DF	WAL	Gemma Evans
24	MF	ENG	Ashanti Akpan
25	DF	IRL	Aoife Mannion
26	FW	SCO	Beth Lumsden
27	DF	SCO	Rachel McLauchlan (captain)
30	FW	ENG	Jessie Gale (on loan from Arsenal)
33	FW	IRL	Leanne Kiernan
45	FW	WAL	Casi Gregson
53	DF	ENG	Abbie Richardson
54	GK	ENG	Sofia Borg
99	DF	ENG	Lia Cataldo

=== Out on loan ===
Note: Flags indicate national team as defined under FIFA eligibility rules; some limited exceptions apply. Players may hold more than one non-FIFA nationality.

No.	Pos.	Nation	Player
21	MF	SCO	Jasmine McQuade (at Hibernian until 30 June 2027)

=== Under-21s squad ===
Updated 2 October 2026

Note: Flags indicate national team as defined under FIFA eligibility rules; some limited exceptions apply. Players may hold more than one non-FIFA nationality.

No.	Pos.	Nation	Player
36		ENG	Annabel Bright
38	MF	ENG	Alexandra Pennock
40		ENG	Hannah McIntosh
42	GK	ENG	Daisy Manders
43		ENG	Teigan Wilson
44		ENG	Rose McCarthy
45		ENG	Eva Mysleyko
46		ENG	Abigail Allan
47		ENG	Jessica Weighell
50		ENG	Mollie Wilson
52		ENG	Lily West

No.	Pos.	Nation	Player
54		ENG	Lucy Plews
55		ENG	Ella Baker
56	DF	ENG	Amelia Freeman
57		ENG	Faye Brannon
58		ENG	Cara Fisher
59	FW	ENG	Macie Halsall
60	FW	AUS	Abby Philipson
66	GK	ENG	Freya Dyos
—		ENG	Lucy Hawkins
—		ENG	Poppy Gourley

== Management and staff ==
For board members and the executive leadership, see Newcastle United.

=== Current staff ===
As of 27 September 2026

Position	Staff
Manager	(Australia) Tanya Oxtoby
Assistant Manager	(Australia) Stuart McLaren
Assistant Head Coach	(England) Charlie Cave
Assistant Coach	(Northern Ireland) Rachel Furness
Head of Goalkeeping	(England) Barry Richardson
Goalkeeper Coach	(England) Stephen Brass
Head of Performance	(England) Liam Connor
Lead Physiotherapist	(England) Rhys Griffiths
Physiotherapist	(England) Chris Walker
Physiotherapist	(England) Becky Inkersole

=== Managerial history ===
Dates	Name	Ref.
2015	(Republic of Ireland) Thomas Butler	
2016–2019	(England) Victoria Greenwell	
2019–2025	(England) Becky Langley	
2025	(England) Claire Ditchburn (interim)	
2025–	(Australia) Tanya Oxtoby	

== Honours ==
- FA Women's National League Premier Division North:

Winners: 2023–24

- FA Women's National League Division One North:

Winners: 2022–23

- Northern Combination Women's Football League:

Winners: 2011–12
Runners-up: 2003–04

- Combination League Cup:

2004–05

- Northern Combination League Cup:

1998–99

- Northumberland FA Senior Cup: 7

2000–01, 2001–02, 2002–03, 2003–04, 2004–05, 2007–08, 2011–12

- Y.E.S Cup (Year of Exercise and Sport):

2006–07

- Lloret Cup:

2003–04

- Nationwide Club of the Year:

2006–07

- John O'Farrell Charity Cup:

2009–10
FA Women's Premier League Reserve Division North: 1
2015–16

- Sela Cup:

2024

== Awards ==
=== Jack Hixon Award ===
This award is after Jack Hixon, a local scout who found several North-East youngsters who went on to become professional footballers.

- 2023: Daisy Burt
- 2024: Elysia Boddy
- 2025: Charlotte Wardlaw
- 2026: Abbie Richardson

Prior to 2023, it was awarded to emerging male footballers.

== See also ==
- Durham W.F.C.
- Middlesbrough F.C. Women
- Sunderland A.F.C. Women
