= 2026 North Carolina Courage season =

2026 North Carolina Courage soccer club season

North Carolina Courage
2026 season
- Managing Owner: Steve Malik
- Club President: Francie Gottsegen
- Head Coach: Mak Lind
- Stadium: First Horizon Stadium at WakeMed Soccer Park; Cary, North Carolina (Capacity: 10,000)
- League: 9th
- Playoffs: DNQ
- Top goalscorer: Ashley Sanchez (20)
- Highest home attendance: 10,803 (vs DEN, Nov 1)
- Lowest home attendance: 6,217 (vs LA, Aug 26)
- Average home league attendance: 8,364
Home colors	Away colors	Third colors
- All statistics correct as of November 1, 2026.

The 2026 North Carolina Courage season was the team's tenth season as a professional women's soccer team. The Courage played in the National Women's Soccer League (NWSL), the top tier of women's soccer in the United States.

== Summary ==
On January 24, 2026, Mak Lind was announced as the new head coach of the North Carolina Courage.

Going into the 2026 season, Kailen Sheridan, Natalie Jacobs and Ryan Williams were named team captains.

== First-team squad ==
=== Current squad ===
As of September 16, 2026

No.	Pos.	Nation	Player
0	GK	USA	Madison White
1	GK	CAN	Kailen Sheridan
2	FW	USA	Ashley Sanchez
3	DF	USA	Sydney Schmidt
4	DF	USA	Natalie Jacobs
5	DF	USA	Cameron Brooks
6	DF	PUR	Ivy Younce
7	FW	ENG	Lauryn Thompson
8	FW	NGR	Chioma Okafor
9	FW	USA	Olivia Wingate
10	FW	SWE	Evelyn Ijeh
11	DF	GER	Felicitas Rauch
12	DF	USA	Talia Staude
13	DF	USA	Ryan Williams
14	MF	CAN	Carly Wickenheiser
15	FW	USA	Payton Crawford
16	MF	USA	Riley Jackson
17	MF	USA	Dani Weatherholt
18	DF	JPN	Uno Shiragaki
19	MF	ENG	Erica Meg Parkinson
20	MF	JPN	Shinomi Koyama
21	FW	BRA	Bia
23	FW	USA	Gianna Paul
25	DF	USA	Maycee Bell
26	MF	NOR	Vilde Bøe Risa
33	FW	USA	Hannah Betfort
35	FW	USA	Ally Schlegel
80	MF	USA	Oli Peña
99	GK	USA	Molly Pritchard

== Competitions ==
=== Regular-season standings ===
Pos	Team	Pld	W	D	L	GF	GA	GD	Pts	Qualification
7	Utah Royals	30	14	5	11	44	39	+5	47	Playoffs
8	Seattle Reign FC	30	14	5	11	37	33	+4	47	Playoffs
9	North Carolina Courage	30	14	3	13	52	42	+10	45	
10	Denver Summit FC	30	11	8	11	53	42	+11	41	
11	Orlando Pride	30	11	3	16	39	47	−8	36	

Source: NWSL
Rules for classification: 1) points; 2) total goal difference; 3) total wins; 4) total goals scored; 5) head-to-head points; 6) head-to-head goal goals scored; 7) fewest disciplinary points; 8) coin toss (if 2 clubs tied) or drawing of lots (if ≥3 clubs tied).

=== Matches ===
March 14 1	North Carolina Courage	2–1	Racing Louisville FC	Cary, North Carolina
7:00 pm EDT	Sanchez 29', 86'; Jacobs (yellow card) 40'	Report	Weber 45+1'	Stadium: WakeMed Soccer Park; Attendance: 8,157; Referee: Jaclyn Metz

March 21 2	Gotham FC	0–0	North Carolina Courage	Harrison, New Jersey
6:30 PM ET	Harper (yellow card) 79'	Report	Jackson (yellow card) 83'	Stadium: Sports Illustrated Stadium; Attendance: 10,796; Referee: Cristian Campo Hernández

March 28 3	North Carolina Courage	1–3	Bay FC	Cary, North Carolina
4:00 p.m. PDT (UTC-7)	Ijeh (yellow card) 45+9'; Matsukubo 65'	Report	Pfeiffer 20'; Barry 30', (yellow card) 41'; Bailey 34'; Lema (yellow card) 76'	Stadium: WakeMed Soccer Park; Attendance: 7,013; Referee: Shawn Tehini

April 4 4	North Carolina Courage	2–2	Portland Thorns FC	Cary, North Carolina
6:30 pm EDT	Matsukubo 28'; Sanchez 37'; Ijeh (yellow card) 80'	Report	Turner 12'; Moultrie 33'; Castellanos (yellow card) 84'	Stadium: WakeMed Soccer Park; Attendance: 7,018; Referee: Alyssa Pennington

April 25 5	Houston Dash	0–1	North Carolina Courage	Houston, Texas
7:00 p.m. CDT (UTC-5)	Patterson (yellow card) 58'; Nielsen (yellow card) 90+2'	Report	Shiragaki (yellow card) 19'; Sanchez 42'; Schlegel (red card) 77'	Stadium: Shell Energy Stadium; Attendance: 6,811; Referee: Matthew Corrigan

April 29 6	Boston Legacy FC	2–2	North Carolina Courage	Foxboro, Massachusetts
7:00 p.m. EDT (UTC-5)	Caño 5'; Smith 13'; Traoré (yellow card) 69'	Report	Vine (yellow card) 49'; Weatherholt 53'; Koyama (yellow card) 55'; Sanchez 76'; Okafor (yellow card) 90+6'	Stadium: Gillette Stadium; Attendance: 3,804; Referee: Thomas Snyder

May 2 7	North Carolina Courage	1–2	Kansas City Current	Cary, North Carolina
6:30 p.m. CDT (UTC-6)	Weatherholt (yellow card) 40'; Matsukubo 85'; Rauch (red card) 90+7'	Report	Bethune 8'; Cooper 23'	Stadium: WakeMed Soccer Park; Attendance: 10,031; Referee: Atahan Yaya

May 8 8	Orlando Pride	1–0	North Carolina Courage	Orlando, Florida
8:00 p.m. EDT (UTC-4)	Yates (yellow card) 21'; Hernández (yellow card) 45+3'; Lemos (yellow card) 45+5'; Banda 87'; Rafaelle (yellow card) 90+7'	Report	Weatherholt (yellow card) 50'	Stadium: Inter&Co Stadium; Attendance: 7,088; Referee: Lauren Aldrich

May 16 9	North Carolina Courage	4–0	Chicago Stars FC	Cary, North Carolina
6:30 p.m. EDT (UTC-4)	Ijeh 47'; Sanchez} 61'; Schlegel 65'; Matsukubo 86'	Report	Huitema (yellow card) 6'; Hayashi (yellow card) 54'	Stadium: WakeMed Soccer Park; Attendance: 10,023; Referee: John Griggs

May 23 10	Racing Louisville FC	1–2	North Carolina Courage	Louisville, Kentucky
4:00 p.m. EDT (UTC-4)	McMahon (yellow card) 8'; Wright 90+1'	Report	Ijeh 13'; Jackson (yellow card) 39'; Sanchez 78'; Shiragaki (yellow card) 87'	Stadium: Lynn Family Stadium; Attendance: 5,942; Referee: Katja Koroleva

May 31 11	Angel City FC	1–2	North Carolina Courage	Los Angeles, California
7:00 p.m. EDT (UTC-4)	Niehues 51'	Report	Shiragaki (yellow card) 3'; Ijeh 48'; Matsukubo 79'	Stadium: BMO Stadium; Attendance: 16,057; Referee: Muhammad Hassan

July 4 12	North Carolina Courage	3–1	Seattle Reign FC	Cary, North Carolina
	Sanchez 22', 71'; Jackson 64' (pen.)	Report	Menti 19'; Curry (yellow card) 63'	Stadium: WakeMed Soccer Park; Attendance: 7,126; Referee: Cristian Campo Hernandez

July 11 13	North Carolina Courage	0–2	Washington Spirit	Cary, North Carolina
6:30 p.m. EDT (UTC-4)	Jackson (yellow card) 76'	Report	Santos 37'; Rodman 45+3'	Stadium: WakeMed Soccer Park; Attendance: 8,726; Referee: Laura Rodriguez

July 18 14	Bay FC	3–0	North Carolina Courage	San Jose, California
4:00 p.m. EDT (UTC-4)	Lema 14', 17'; Kundananji 54'	Report		Stadium: PayPal Park; Attendance: 12,081; Referee: Lauren Aldrich

July 25 15	North Carolina Courage	1–4	Utah Royals	Cary, North Carolina
7:45 p.m. EDT (UTC-4)	Ijeh 55'	Report	Del Fava 6'; Miura (yellow card) 20'; Milazzo 34'; Tanaka 65'; Lacasse 90+4' (pen.)	Stadium: WakeMed Soccer Park; Attendance: 7,133; Referee: Marie Durr

July 31 16	North Carolina Courage	5–0	Orlando Pride	Cary, North Carolina
8:00 p.m. EDT (UTC-4)	Thompson 4'; Ijeh 26', 35', 70'; Sanchez 90+3'	Report	Chavoshi (yellow card) 10'; McCutcheon (yellow card) 45+3'	Stadium: WakeMed Soccer Park; Attendance: 7,232; Referee: Trevor Wiseman

August 5 17	Denver Summit FC	0–2	North Carolina Courage	Centennial, Colorado
10:00 p.m. EDT (UTC-4)		Report	Parkinson (yellow card) 43'; Jackson 48' (pen.); Schlegel 81'; Jacobs (yellow card) 89'	Stadium: Centennial Stadium; Attendance: 11,008; Referee: Shawn Tehini

August 8 18	Washington Spirit	3–4	North Carolina Courage	Washington, D.C.
6:30 p.m. EDT (UTC-4)	Morgan (yellow card) 35'; Rodman 47'; Cantore 50'; Bernal 90'	Report	Sanchez 2'; Ijeh 9', 15'; Rauch (yellow card) 37'; Bøe Risa (yellow card) 75'; Jacobs 90+5'; Bell (yellow card) 90+8'	Stadium: Audi Field; Attendance: 14,168; Referee: Joshua Encarnación

August 16 19	North Carolina Courage	2–3	Houston Dash	Cary, North Carolina
7:00 p.m. EDT (UTC-4)	Schlegel 37'; Ijeh 51'	Report	Faasse 42'; Larisey 80', 90+3'; Colaprico (yellow card) 86'	Stadium: WakeMed Soccer Park; Attendance: 7,031; Referee: Jamie Padilla

August 22 20	North Carolina Courage	2–1	Boston Legacy FC	Cary, North Carolina
7:30 p.m. EDT (UTC-4)	Sanchez 10', 90+17' (pen.); Parkinson (yellow card) 83'	Report	Traoré 90+2'; Caño (yellow card) 90+11'	Stadium: WakeMed Soccer Park; Attendance: 8,050; Referee: Laadi Issaka

August 26 21	North Carolina Courage	2–0	Angel City FC	Cary, North Carolina
8:00 p.m. EDT (UTC-4)	Sanchez 41', 78'	Report	Ary Borges (yellow card) 21'	Stadium: WakeMed Soccer Park; Attendance: 6,217; Referee: Elvis Osmanovic

August 29 22	Kansas City Current	3–2	North Carolina Courage	Kansas City, Missouri
6:30 p.m. EDT (UTC-4)	Staude 12' (o.g.); Bethune 35'; Cooper 41' (yellow card) 55'; LaBonta (yellow card) 59'; Rodriguez (yellow card) 74'; Hopkins (yellow card) 90'	Report	Ijeh 45+3'; Rauch (yellow card) 45+5'; Jackson 77' (pen.); Staude (yellow card) 82'; Parkinson (yellow card) 90+6'	Stadium: CPKC Stadium; Attendance: 11,500; Referee: Tiffini Turpin

September 6 23	Chicago Stars FC	0–6	North Carolina Courage	Evanston, Illinois
4:00 p.m. EDT (UTC-4)	Bike (yellow card) 45+2'; Franklin (yellow card) 84'0	Report	Sanchez 11', 69' (pen.), 81'; Okafor 17'; Koyama 61'; Williams 63'; Shiragaki (yellow card) 80'	Stadium: Martin Stadium; Attendance: 4,722; Referee: Danielle Chesky

September 12 24	San Diego Wave FC	2–1	North Carolina Courage	San Diego, California
6:30 p.m. EDT (UTC-4)	Corley 23'; Barcenas 72'	Report	Okafor (yellow card) 44'; Sanchez 82'	Stadium: Snapdragon Stadium; Attendance: 9,853; Referee: Matthew Thompson

September 19 25	North Carolina Courage	1–2	Gotham FC	Cary, North Carolina
6:30 p.m. EDT (UTC-4)	Staude 69'; Weatherholt (yellow card) 88'	Report	Dudley 8', 90+1'; Davidson (yellow card) 90+5'	Stadium: WakeMed Soccer Park; Attendance: 10,551; Referee: John Matto

September 27 26	Utah Royals	2–1	North Carolina Courage	Sandy, Utah
7:00 p.m. EDT (UTC-4)	Lacasse 17', (yellow card) 44'; Delzer 65'; Del Fava (yellow card) 45+3'; Miura (yellow card) 68'; Riehl (yellow card) 87'	Report	Sanchez 37' (pen.); Bia (yellow card) 90+1'	Stadium: America First Field; Attendance: 5,572; Referee: Jaclyn Metz

October 2 27	Seattle Reign FC	0–1	North Carolina Courage	Seattle, Washington
10:00 p.m. EDT (UTC-4)	McCammon (yellow card) 3'; Mondésir (yellow card) 78'	Report	Paul 48'; Parkinson (yellow card) 73'; Wickenheiser (yellow card) 80'	Stadium: Lumen Field; Attendance: 6,952; Referee: Mark Verso

October 17 28	North Carolina Courage	1–2	San Diego Wave FC	Cary, North Carolina
7:00 p.m. EDT (UTC-4)	Jacobs (yellow card) 60'; Bøe Risa 83'	Report	Barcenas 4'; Wesley (yellow card) 26'; Byars 52'	Stadium: WakeMed Soccer Park; Attendance: 10,353; Referee: Brad Jensen

October 23 29	Portland Thorns FC	1–0	North Carolina Courage	Portland, Oregon
10:00 p.m. EDT (UTC-4)	Müller (yellow card) 27', (goal) 60'	Report	Bia (yellow card) 55'; Jackson (yellow card) 79'	Stadium: Providence Park; Attendance: 20,105; Referee: Matthew Thompson

November 1 30	North Carolina Courage	1–0	Denver Summit FC	Cary, North Carolina
3:00 p.m. MST (UTC-7)	Kurtz 90+4' (o.g.)	Report	Smith (yellow card) 30'; Regan (yellow card) 78'	Stadium: WakeMed Soccer Park; Attendance: 10,803; Referee: Nabil Bensalah

== Transactions ==
=== Transfers ===
==== In ====
Date	Player	Position	Source club	Fee/notes	Ref
December 4, 2025	(United States) Ally Schlegel	FW	(United States) Chicago Stars FC	Free agent	
December 8, 2025	(England) Lauryn Thompson	FW	(United States) Indy Eleven	First professional contract	
December 9, 2025	(United States) Madison White	GK	(United States) Racing Louisville FC	Free Agent	
December 10, 2025	(Nigeria) Chioma Okafor	FW	(United States) UConn Huskies	First professional contract	
January 8, 2026	(Canada) Kailen Sheridan	GK	(United States) San Diego Wave FC	Free agent	
January 16, 2026	(United States) Molly Pritchard	GK	(United States) Ohio State Buckeyes	First professional contract	
January 23, 2026	(Sweden) Evelyn Ijeh	FW	(Italy) AC Milan Women	Transfer	
January 29, 2026	(United States) Cameron Brooks	DF	(Italy) Napoli Women	Transfer	
January 31, 2026	(Canada) Carly Wickenheiser	MF	(Sweden) BK Häcken	Transfer	
March 9, 2026	(Japan) Uno Shiragaki	DF	(Japan) Cerezo Osaka Yanmar Ladies	Transfer	
March 10, 2026	(Puerto Rico) Ivy Younce	DF	(United States) Liberty Flames	First professional contract	
July 1, 2026	(England) Erica Meg Parkinson	MF	(Portugal) Valadares Gaia	Free agent	
July 29, 2026	(Norway) Vilde Bøe Risa	MF	(Spain) Atlético Madrid	Free agent	
4 September 2026	(Brazil) Bia	MF	(Russia) Zenit Saint Petersburg	Transfer	

==== Out ====
Date	Player	Position	Destination club	Fee/notes	Ref
November 13, 2025	(United States) Kaleigh Kurtz	DF	(United States) Denver Summit	Free agent	
December 1, 2025	(United States) Brianna Pinto	MF	(United States) Chicago Stars FC	Free agent	
December 2, 2025	(United States) Katie Cappelletti	GK	(United States) Kansas City Current	Out of contract	
December 2, 2025	(United States) Tyler Lussi	FW	(United States) Carolina Ascent	Out of contract	
December 2, 2025	(United States) Heather MacNab	FW	(United States) Dallas Trinity	Out of contract	
December 2, 2025	(United States) Meredith Speck	FW	(United States) Gotham FC	Out of contract	
December 11, 2025	(United States) Marisa Jordan	GK	(United States) Kansas City Current	Trade	
December 11, 2025	(Canada) Brooklyn Courtnall	DF	(United States) Bay FC	Trade	
December 15, 2025	(United States) Casey Murphy	GK	(United States) Boston Legacy FC	Free agent	
December 31, 2025	(Australia) Charlotte McLean	DF	(Australia) Sydney FC	Out of contract	
January 12, 2026	(Canada) Victoria Pickett	MF	(Canada) AFC Toronto	Out of contract	
January 17, 2026	(Republic of Ireland) Denise O'Sullivan	MF	(England) Liverpool	Transfer, £300,000	
January 28, 2026	(Brazil) Aline Gomes	MF	(Mexico) Pachuca	Transfer	
June 2, 2026	(Australia) Cortnee Vine	FW	(Australia) Melbourne City	Agreed to a mutual contract termination	
July 3, 2026	(Japan) Manaka Matsukubo	MF	(England) Chelsea	Transfer	

== Statistics ==
As of August 16, 2026

=== Appearances and goals ===
Starting appearances are listed first, followed by substitute appearances after the + symbol where applicable.

No.	Pos	Nat	Player	Total		NWSL	
No.	Pos	Nat	Player	Apps	Goals	Apps	Goals
Goalkeepers
0	GK	(United States) USA	Madi White	0	0	0	0
1	GK	(Canada) CAN	Kailen Sheridan	19	0	19	0
99	GK	(United States) USA	Molly Pritchard	0	0	0	0
Defenders
3	DF	(United States) USA	Sydney Schmidt	3	0	1+2	0
4	DF	(United States) USA	Natalie Jacobs	7	1	6+1	1
5	DF	(United States) USA	Cameron Brooks	1	0	0+1	0
6	DF	(Puerto Rico) PUR	Ivy Younce	7	0	0+7	0
11	DF	(Germany) GER	Feli Rauch	14	0	7+7	0
12	DF	(United States) USA	Natalia Staude	13	0	8+5	0
13	DF	(United States) USA	Ryan Williams	19	0	19	0
18	DF	(Japan) JPN	Uno Shiragaki	14	0	13+1	0
25	DF	(United States) USA	Maycee Bell	14	0	14	0
Midfielders
2	MF	(United States) USA	Ashley Sanchez	19	11	19	11
14	MF	(Canada) CAN	Carly Wickenheiser	15	0	5+10	0
16	MF	(United States) USA	Riley Jackson	19	2	19	2
17	MF	(United States) USA	Dani Weatherholt	13	1	11+2	1
19	MF	(England) ENG	Erica Meg Parkinson	6	0	5+1	0
20	MF	(Japan) JPN	Shinomi Koyama	19	0	19	0
26	MF	(Norway) NOR	Vilde Bøe Risa	4	0	0+4	0
34	MF	(Japan) JPN	Manaka Matsukubo	9	5	8+1	5
80	MF	(United States) USA	Oli Peña	0	0	0	0
Forwards
7	FW	(England) ENG	Lauryn Thompson	9	1	3+6	1
8	FW	(Nigeria) NGR	Chioma Okafor	11	0	2+9	0
9	FW	(United States) USA	Olivia Wingate	2	0	0+2	0
10	FW	(Sweden) SWE	Evelyn Ijeh	18	10	15+3	10
15	FW	(United States) USA	Payton Crawford	3	0	2+1	0
22	FW	(Australia) AUS	Cortnee Vine	2	0	1+1	0
33	FW	(United States) USA	Hannah Betfort	14	0	4+10	0
35	FW	(United States) USA	Ally Schlegel	16	3	8+8	3
