= List of North Carolina Courage players =

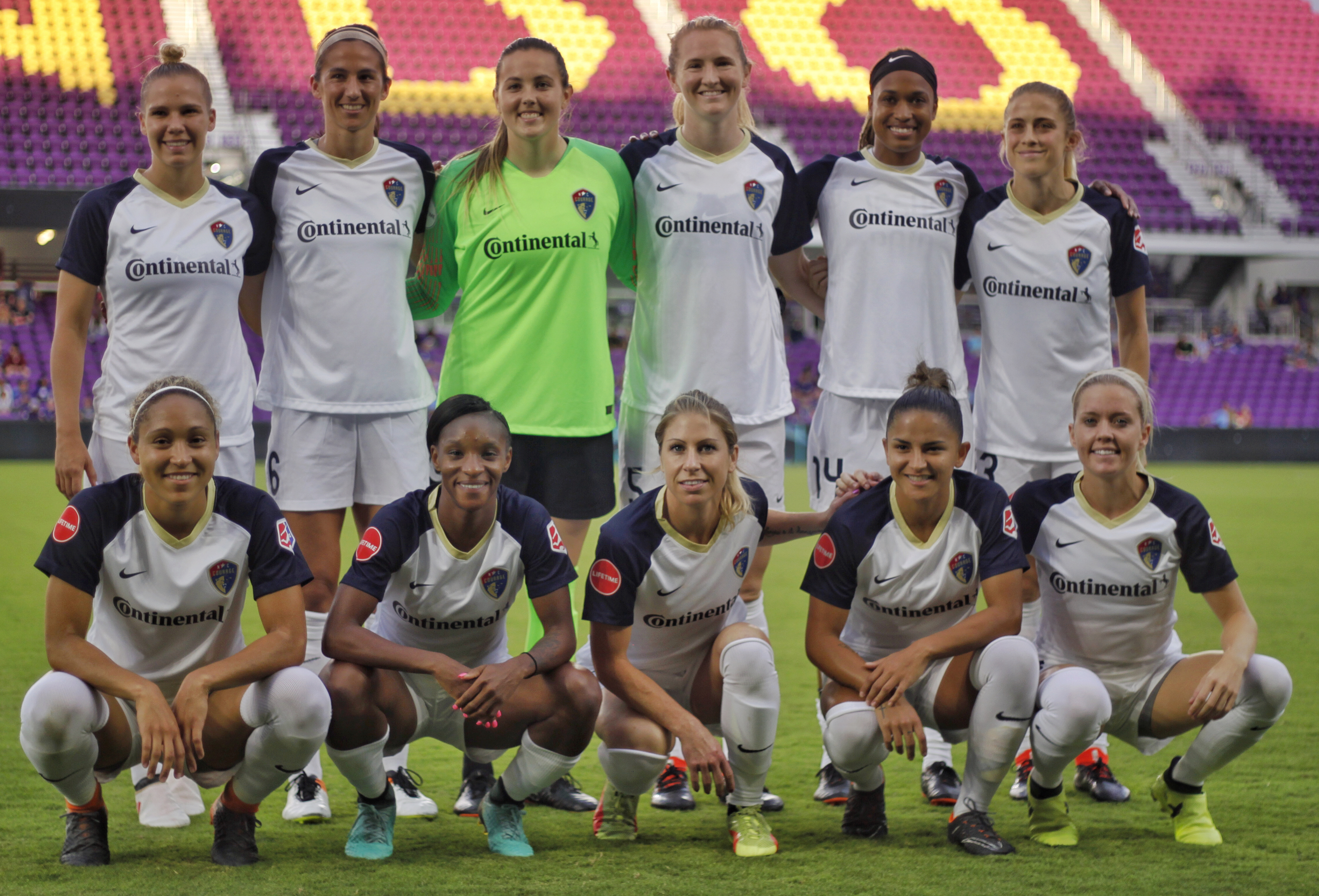
North Carolina Courage lineup, week 10 of 2018: Mathias, Erceg, Rowland, Mewis, McDonald, Dahlkemper Daniels, Dunn, Zerboni, Debinha, O'Sullivan

The North Carolina Courage is an American soccer club that plays in the National Women's Soccer League (NWSL). It was founded when the Western New York Flash relocated to Cary, North Carolina, in 2017.

This list includes all players who have made at least one competitive appearance for the Courage. Playing statistics are correct as of November 1, 2026, and they are updated once a year after the conclusion of the NWSL season.

== Players and appearances ==
Yrs	No.	Pos	Nat	Player	Total		NWSL		Playoffs		Other (Note: Includes Challenge Cup, Summer Cup, and Fall Series.)	
Yrs	No.	Pos	Nat	Player	Apps	Goals	Apps	Goals	Apps	Goals	Apps	Goals
2021	20	FW	(Canada) CAN	Lindsay Agnew	4	0	1	0	0	0	3	0
2020–2022	29	FW	(United States) USA	Rylee Baisden	18	1	12	1	0	0	6	0
2022	33	FW	(United States) USA	Jorian Baucom	7	0	6	0	0	0	1	0
2024–	27	DF	(United States) USA	Maycee Bell	42	0	42	0	0	0	0	0
2022–2025	7	DF	(United States) USA	Malia Berkely	90	3	69	1	2	0	19	2
2025–	30	FW	(United States) USA	Hannah Betfort	41	2	41	2	0	0	0	0
2026–	21	FW	(Brazil) BRA	Bia	8	0	8	0	0	0	0	0
2022–2023	28	FW	(United States) USA	Tess Boade	24	4	17	3	1	0	6	1
2026–	26	MF	(Norway) NOR	Vilde Bøe Risa	14	1	14	1	0	0	0	0
2022	14	DF	(United States) USA	Katie Bowen	3	0	2	0	0	0	1	0
2026–	5	DF	(United States) USA	Cameron Brooks	1	0	1	0	0	0	0	0
2021	7	DF	(Republic of Ireland) IRL	Diane Caldwell	8	0	7	0	0	0	1	0
2018	2	DF	(Canada) CAN	Allysha Chapman	1	0	1	0	0	0	0	0
2023	2	DF	(United States) USA	Sarah Clark	2	0	0	0	0	0	2	0
2023–2025	18	DF	(Canada) CAN	Sydney Collins	10	0	4	0	0	0	6	0
2025	24	DF	(Canada) CAN	Brooklyn Courtnall	2	0	2	0	0	0	0	0
2025–	15	FW	(United States) USA	Payton Crawford	18	0	18	0	0	0	0	0
2018	12	FW	(United States) USA	Frannie Crouse	1	0	1	0	0	0	0	0
2017–2020	13	DF	(United States) USA	Abby Dahlkemper	71	1	57	0	6	0	8	1
2017–2018	1	GK	(Canada) CAN	Sabrina D'Angelo	15	0	14	0	0	0	1	0
2017–2019, 2022	15	DF	(United States) USA	Jaelene Daniels	102	3	83	2	6	0	13	1
2017–2022	10	MF	(Brazil) BRA	Debinha	126	51	100	35	6	3	20	13
2021	15	DF	(United States) USA	Schuyler DeBree	6	0	2	0	0	0	4	0
2017	3	MF	(United States) USA	Makenzy Doniak	23	0	22	0	1	0	0	0
2018–2020	19	FW	(United States) USA	Crystal Dunn	44	18	35	15	4	2	5	1
2017–2019	4	MF	(United States) USA	Elizabeth Eddy	10	1	10	1	0	0	0	0
2017–2022	6	DF	(New Zealand) NZL	Abby Erceg	125	8	105	6	7	0	13	2
2020	28	FW	(United States) USA	Danica Evans	4	0	0	0	0	0	4	0
2023	29	FW	(England) ENG	Millie Farrow	3	0	2	0	0	0	1	0
2021	30	DF	(United States) USA	Kendall Fletcher	1	0	1	0	0	0	0	0
2023	12	DF	(United States) USA	Emily Fox	23	0	18	0	1	0	4	0
2023	22	FW	(Denmark) DEN	Mille Gejl	18	3	14	2	1	0	3	1
2024–2025	77	FW	(Brazil) BRA	Aline Gomes	22	2	21	2	1	0	0	0
2022	16	MF	(United States) USA	Emily Gray	7	0	3	0	0	0	4	0
2017–2021	23	FW	(United States) USA	Kristen Hamilton	86	18	71	16	6	0	9	2
2020	22	DF	(United States) USA	Hailey Harbison	4	0	0	0	0	0	4	0
2026–	36	DF	(United States) USA	Ella Hase	1	0	1	0	0	0	0	0
2017	12	FW	(United States) USA	Ashley Hatch	24	7	22	7	2	0	0	0
2017	2	DF	(Norway) NOR	Nora Holstad Berge	2	0	2	0	0	0	0	0
2023–2024	5	FW	(United States) USA	Haley Hopkins	48	7	36	4	2	0	10	3
2026–	10	FW	(Sweden) SWE	Evelyn Ijeh	29	11	29	11	0	0	0	0
2024–	16	MF	(United States) USA	Riley Jackson	73	6	69	5	0	0	4	1
2025–	4	DF	(United States) USA	Natalie Jacobs	17	1	17	1	0	0	0	0
2021	34	MF	(Wales) WAL	Angharad James	17	1	16	1	1	0	0	0
2018	16	FW	(United States) USA	Darian Jenkins	14	0	12	0	2	0	0	0
2024–2025	44	GK	(United States) USA	Marisa Jordan	9	0	5	0	0	0	4	0
2017–2018	20	DF	(Japan) JPN	Yuri Kawamura	10	0	10	0	0	0	0	0
2022–2024	9	FW	(Brazil) BRA	Kerolin	48	19	37	17	1	0	10	2
2025–	20	MF	(Japan) JPN	Shinomi Koyama	55	4	55	4	0	0	0	0
2018–2025	3,30	DF	(United States) USA	Kaleigh Kurtz	163	5	132	5	3	0	28	0
2019–2020	1	GK	(Canada) CAN	Stephanie Labbé	22	0	16	0	2	0	4	0
2023–2025	14	FW	(United States) USA	Tyler Lussi	75	12	62	12	1	0	12	0
2021	16	MF	(United States) USA	Hailie Mace	14	2	10	2	0	0	4	0
2025	28	FW	(United States) USA	Heather MacNab	2	0	2	0	0	0	0	0
2022–2023	17	FW	(Denmark) DEN	Rikke Madsen	24	1	20	1	1	0	3	0
2018–2022	11	DF	(United States) USA	Merritt Mathias	98	5	83	3	3	0	12	2
2023–2026	34	MF	(Japan) JPN	Manaka Matsukubo	65	21	58	19	2	0	5	2
2017–2021	14	FW	(United States) USA	Jessica McDonald	90	26	77	20	7	4	6	2
2024–2025	33	DF	(Australia) AUS	Charlotte McLean	1	0	0	0	0	0	1	0
2019–2020	4	FW	(United States) USA	McKenzie Meehan	4	0	3	0	0	0	1	0
2020	27	DF	(United States) USA	Addisyn Merrick	8	0	0	0	0	0	8	0
2024	19	MF	(United States) USA	Landy Mertz	4	1	2	0	0	0	2	1
2017–2021	5	MF	(United States) USA	Sam Mewis	69	15	58	12	6	2	5	1
2019–2020	2,27	DF	(United States) USA	Lauren Milliet	10	0	2	0	0	0	8	0
2020	26	DF	(United States) USA	Sinclaire Miramontez	1	0	0	0	0	0	1	0
2023–2024	6	MF	(Japan) JPN	Narumi Miura	61	2	47	1	2	0	12	1
2021–2025	1	GK	(United States) USA	Casey Murphy	116	0	108	0	3	0	5	0
2019–2021	37,42	GK	(United States) USA	Samantha Murphy	2	0	2	0	0	0	0	0
2022	25	MF	(Japan) JPN	Fūka Nagano	11	2	11	2	0	0	0	0
2017	22	DF	(United States) USA	Stephanie Ochs	6	0	5	0	1	0	0	0
2026–	8	FW	(Nigeria) NGR	Chioma Okafor	18	1	18	1	0	0	0	0
2022	12	FW	(Mexico) MEX	Diana Ordóñez	25	12	19	11	0	0	6	1
2018–2019	17	MF	(United States) USA	Heather O'Reilly	25	2	21	1	4	1	0	0
2017–2025	8,10	MF	(Republic of Ireland) IRL	Denise O'Sullivan	186	5	155	3	9	1	22	1
2026–	19	MF	(England) ENG	Erica Meg Parkinson	17	0	17	0	0	0	0	0
2026–	23	FW	(United States) USA	Gianna Paul	6	1	6	1	0	0	0	0
2019–2021	24	MF	(United States) USA	Peyton Perea	4	0	0	0	0	0	4	0
2021–2022	4	DF	(United States) USA	Carson Pickett	56	1	44	1	1	0	11	0
2022–2023	23	DF	(United States) USA	Kiki Pickett	22	0	13	0	0	0	9	0
2023–2025	94,99	MF	(Canada) CAN	Victoria Pickett	37	1	29	1	0	0	8	0
2022–2025	5,8	MF	(United States) USA	Brianna Pinto	90	11	71	8	1	0	18	3
2019	12	FW	(United States) USA	Leah Pruitt	14	2	14	2	0	0	0	0
2021–2023	11,27	FW	(United States) USA	Brittany Ratcliffe	37	6	30	3	1	0	6	3
2024–	11	DF	(Germany) GER	Felicitas Rauch	59	3	58	3	1	0	0	0
2018–2021	16,21	MF	(United States) USA	Cari Roccaro	51	0	38	0	3	0	10	0
2021	12	FW	(United States) USA	Amy Rodriguez	15	3	14	3	1	0	0	0
2020	30	DF	(United States) USA	Arianna Romero	1	0	0	0	0	0	1	0
2017	8	MF	(Brazil) BRA	Rosana	4	0	4	0	0	0	0	0
2017–2023	0,99	GK	(United States) USA	Katelyn Rowland	70	0	47	0	3	0	20	0
2024–	2	MF	(United States) USA	Ashley Sanchez	84	28	79	27	1	0	4	1
2023	26	MF	(United States) USA	Clara Schilke	3	0	2	0	0	0	1	0
2026–	35	FW	(United States) USA	Ally Schlegel	19	3	19	3	0	0	0	0
2026–	3	DF	(United States) USA	Sydney Schmidt	3	0	3	0	0	0	0	0
2025	19	MF	(United States) USA	Jaedyn Shaw	19	3	19	3	0	0	0	0
2026–	1	GK	(Canada) CAN	Kailen Sheridan	30	0	30	0	0	0	0	0
2026–	18	DF	(Japan) JPN	Uno Shiragaki	24	0	24	0	0	0	0	0
2017, 2021–2022	2,11	DF	(United States) USA	Taylor Smith	52	2	40	0	3	0	9	2
2020–2022	19	MF	(Jamaica) JAM	Havana Solaun	23	1	20	1	0	0	3	0
2017–2025	25	MF	(United States) USA	Meredith Speck	127	8	100	7	2	1	25	0
2019	16	MF	(Sweden) SWE	Julia Spetsmark	12	2	11	2	1	0	0	0
2025–	12	DF	(United States) USA	Talia Staude	30	1	30	1	0	0	0	0
2024	23	FW	(Canada) CAN	Bianca St-Georges	22	3	21	3	1	0	0	0
2022–2023	19,24	MF	(United States) USA	Frankie Tagliaferri	19	2	13	0	0	0	6	2
2026–	7	FW	(England) ENG	Lauryn Thompson	12	1	12	1	0	0	0	0
2024–2026	22	FW	(Australia) AUS	Cortnee Vine	23	2	22	2	1	0	0	0
2020	17	FW	(United States) USA	Ally Watt	1	0	0	0	0	0	1	0
2024–	17	MF	(United States) USA	Dani Weatherholt	59	2	55	2	0	0	4	0
2026–	14	MF	(Canada) CAN	Carly Wickenheiser	25	0	25	0	0	0	0	0
2018–	13,20,29	DF	(United States) USA	Ryan Williams	170	2	143	2	3	0	24	0
2017–2021	9	FW	(United States) USA	Lynn Williams	100	48	81	42	7	0	12	6
2023–2026	9,20	FW	(United States) USA	Olivia Wingate	38	4	28	2	1	0	9	2
2017	26	MF	(United States) USA	Sam Witteman	12	0	12	0	0	0	0	0
2026–	6	DF	(Puerto Rico) PUR	Ivy Younce	8	0	8	0	0	0	0	0
2017–2019	7	MF	(United States) USA	McCall Zerboni	69	6	65	6	4	0	0	0

- Source: FBref, Soccerway
