= NWSL Midfielder of the Year =

Annual award in US women's soccer

2024 and 2026 winner Croix Bethune

The NWSL Midfielder of the Year award is presented annually to the best midfielder in the National Women's Soccer League (NWSL).

Croix Bethune won the first Midfielder of the Year award in 2024. The most recent winner is also Bethune (2026).

As of 2025, the NWSL's individual end-of-year awards are voted upon in two rounds: in the first round, players (50%), owners/general managers/coaches (25%), and media (25%) vote to determine the nominees; in the second round, players (40%), owners/general managers/coaches (25%), media (25%), and fans (10%) vote among the nominees to determine the winner.

== Winners ==
Season	Player	Nationality	Club	Other finalists	Ref.
2024	Croix Bethune	United States	Washington Spirit	(United States) Vanessa DiBernardo, Kansas City Current (United States) Lo'eau LaBonta, Kansas City Current (Brazil) Marta, Orlando Pride (United States) Ashley Sanchez, North Carolina Courage	
2025	Manaka Matsukubo	Japan	North Carolina Courage	(France) Kenza Dali, San Diego Wave FC (Brazil) Debinha, Kansas City Current (United States) Claire Hutton, Kansas City Current (United States) Olivia Moultrie, Portland Thorns FC	
2026	Croix Bethune	United States	Kansas City Current	(France) Kenza Dali, San Diego Wave FC (United States) Jaelin Howell, Gotham FC (United States) Rose Lavelle, Gotham FC (Japan) Mina Tanaka, Utah Royals	

== Wins by team ==
Club	Wins
Kansas City Current	1
North Carolina Courage	1
Washington Spirit	1

== Wins by nationality ==
Nationality	Wins
Japan	1
United States	1

== See also ==
- List of sports awards honoring women
- NWSL Players' Awards
- NWSL awards
- NWSL records and statistics
- Women's soccer in the United States
