= Uno Shiragaki =

Japanese footballer (born 2005)

Uno Shiragaki 白垣うの
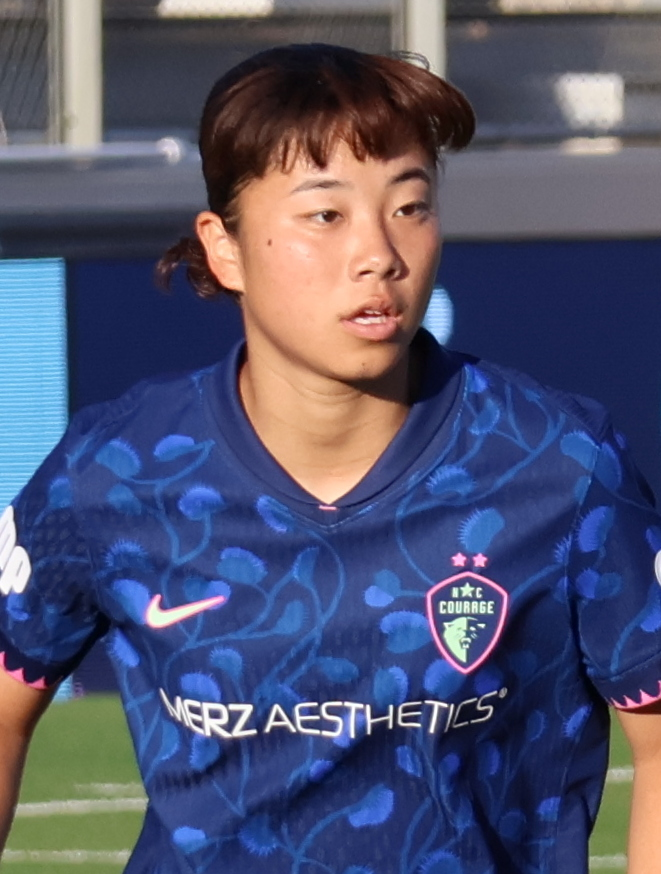
- Uno with the North Carolina Courage in 2026

Personal information
- Date of birth: 11 October 2005 (age 21)
- Height: 1.69 m (5 ft 7 in)
- Position: Defender

Team information
- Current team: North Carolina Courage
- Number: 18

Senior career*
Years	Team	Apps	(Gls)
2021–2025	Cerezo Osaka Yanmar Ladies	73	(3)
2026–	North Carolina Courage	24	(0)

International career^{‡}
2022	Japan U-17		
2023	Japan U-19		
2024	Japan U-20		
2025–	Japan	2	(0)
- * Club domestic league appearances and goals as of 06:57, 8 November 2026 (UTC) ‡ National team caps and goals as of 12 February 2026

Uno Shiragaki (白垣うの, Shiragaki Uno; born 11 October 2005) is a Japanese professional footballer who plays as a defender for the North Carolina Courage of the National Women's Soccer League (NWSL) and the Japan national team.

== Club career ==
On 9 March 2026, the NWSL's North Carolina Courage announced the signing of Uno on a three-year contract, making a Japanese trio at the club alongside Manaka Matsukubo and Shinomi Koyama.

== International career ==
Uno represented Japan's youth national teams at the 2022 FIFA U-17 Women's World Cup and the 2024 FIFA U-20 Women's World Cup, reaching the final at the latter tournament. She was called up to the senior national team for the first time as an injury replacement for Hikaru Kitagawa in October 2025.

== Honors ==
Japan U-20

- FIFA U-20 Women's World Cup runner-up: 2024
- AFC U-20 Women's Asian Cup runner-up: 2024
