= Ashley Sanchez =

American soccer player (born 1999)

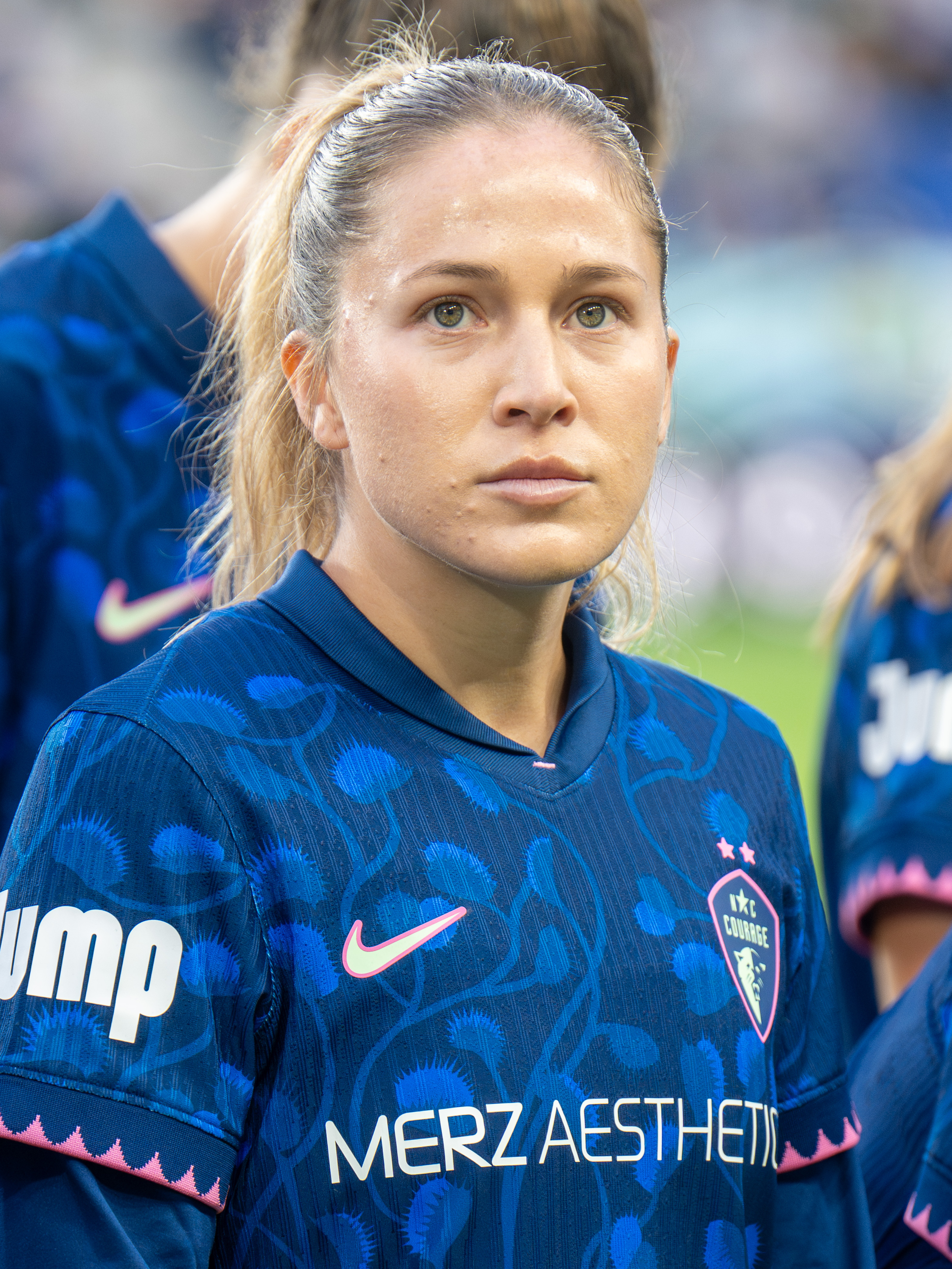
- Sanchez with the North Carolina Courage in 2026

Personal information
- Full name: Ashley Nicole Sanchez
- Date of birth: March 16, 1999 (age 27)
- Place of birth: Pasadena, California, United States
- Height: 5 ft 4 in (1.63 m)
- Positions: Attacking midfielder; left winger

Team information
- Current team: North Carolina Courage
- Number: 2

Youth career
- Santa Anita SC
- Legends FC
- So Cal Blues

College career
Years	Team	Apps	(Gls)
2017–2019	UCLA Bruins	69	(23)

Senior career*
Years	Team	Apps	(Gls)
2020–2023	Washington Spirit	61	(12)
2024–	North Carolina Courage	79	(27)

International career^{‡}
2013	United States U14		
2013–2014	United States U15		
2014–2016	United States U17	21	(21)
2014–2018	United States U20	33	(11)
2021–	United States	30	(4)
- * Club domestic league appearances and goals as of November 1, 2026 ‡ National team caps and goals as of October 13, 2026

Ashley Nicole Sanchez (born March 16, 1999) is an American professional soccer player who plays as an attacking midfielder or left winger for the North Carolina Courage of the National Women's Soccer League (NWSL) and the United States national team.

Sanchez played college soccer for the UCLA Bruins, earning first-team All-American honors and setting the program record for career assists. She was drafted fourth overall by the Washington Spirit in the 2020 NWSL draft and helped lead the Spirit to the 2021 NWSL Championship. After four seasons in Washington, she was traded to the Courage in 2024. In 2026, she won the NWSL Golden Boot by tying the league's single-season scoring record with 20 goals.

Sanchez played extensively for the youth national team and was named the U.S. Soccer Young Female Player of the Year in 2016. She made her senior debut for the United States in 2021.

== Early life and education ==
Born in Pasadena, California in the Los Angeles region to Julie and Ralph Sanchez, Ashley was raised in the nearby city of Monrovia. She is of Mexican descent, with roots in Jalisco.

As a high schooler, Sanchez attended Mountain Park School for three years and Monrovia High School for one year. She played for the varsity team in 2013 and began participating in national team camps the same year. As a senior in 2016, she was named NSCAA Youth Girls All-American Player of the Year. She competed in regional Olympic Development Programs as well.

Sanchez played youth soccer for Santa Anita SC, Legends FC, and So Cal Blues. She was named Cal South Youth Female Player of the Year in 2016 as well as U.S. Soccer Young Female Player of the Year.

== College career ==
Sanchez attended the University of California, Los Angeles (UCLA) and played for the Bruins from 2017 to 2019. She committed to UCLA in eighth grade, having also considered Los Angeles rival University of Southern California.

As a freshman in 2017, Sanchez's 12 assists set a new all-time record for Bruin freshmen that ranked fourth all-time in a single-season. The 24 points she notched (six goals, including 3 game-winners, and 12 assists) ranked third on the team. During the Bruins' eight-game win streak, she notched a goal or assist in each consecutive game elevating UCLA to be ranked sixth in the nation. Sanchez earned Pac-12 Offensive Player of the Week, Top Drawer Soccer National Player of the Week honors and was named to Pac-12 All-Freshman, First-team All-West Region, and All-Pac-12 teams. During the 2017 NCAA College Cup, her four assists (tied for third-most in UCLA record books) helped lead the team to the Championship where they were eliminated by Stanford Cardinal 3–2.

External videos
- Ashley Sanchez UCLA Highlights retrieved June 1, 2023

During the 2018 season, Sanchez led the Bruins in goals (10), assists (15), and points (35). Her assists ranked second nationwide. She set new school records to single-game assists, consecutive games with a goal or assist, assists at the NCAA College Cup, and career NCAA Tournament assists. She also tied the previous school record for assists in a single season. Sanchez was named a Hermann Trophy semifinalist, first-team All-American by United Soccer Coaches, and earned first-team All-West Region and All-Pac-12 honors for the second time.

In what ended up being her final season with the Bruins in 2019 (before turning professional), Sanchez tied her own season record for assists with 15. Her seven goals and 29 points ranked second on the team. She was named Pac-12 Offensive Player of the Week as well as Top Drawer Soccer Team of the Week, and earned first-team All-Pac-12 and second-team All-Pacific Region honors. Her 42 career assists broke UCLA's record despite her only playing three seasons.

== Club career ==
=== Washington Spirit (2020–2023) ===
Sanchez was drafted by the Washington Spirit in January 2020. She made her professional debut for the Spirit during the 2020 NWSL Challenge Cup. At age 21, she was the youngest player on the squad. She was a starter in four of the team's five matches and created the highest number of chances and key passes, with 8 and 7 respectively. Her performance earned her the 2020 NWSL Challenge Cup Future Legend Award. During the NWSL Fall Series (a modified season due to the COVID-19 pandemic), Sanchez was a starter in all four of the team's matches. The Spirit finished in third place with a 2–1–1 record.

External videos
- NWSL Challenge Cup Future Legend: Ashley Sanchez, Washington Spirit retrieved June 1, 2023

During the 2021 season, Sanchez played a total of 25 games (starting in 24) and recorded 5 goals, displaying her versatility as an attacking player. Her vision and ability to create scoring opportunities were evident throughout the season, as she helped the Spirit push for a playoff spot. The Spirit finished the regular season in third place with a 11–7–6 record advancing to the NWSL Playoffs where they defeated the North Carolina Courage 1–0 in extra time. Sanchez scored the game-winning goal in the team's second playoff match against OL Reign to advance to the championship final. The Spirit went on to beat the Chicago Red Stars 2–1 in extra time to clinch their first championship title.

An offensive force, Sanchez led the Spirit in assists, shots, and shots on goal during the 2022 season. In her 19 appearances (16 starts), she also scored three goals. Her first goal of the season was a "stunning" strike that opened the door to a 2–1 win over OL Reign in Seattle.

=== North Carolina Courage (2024–present) ===
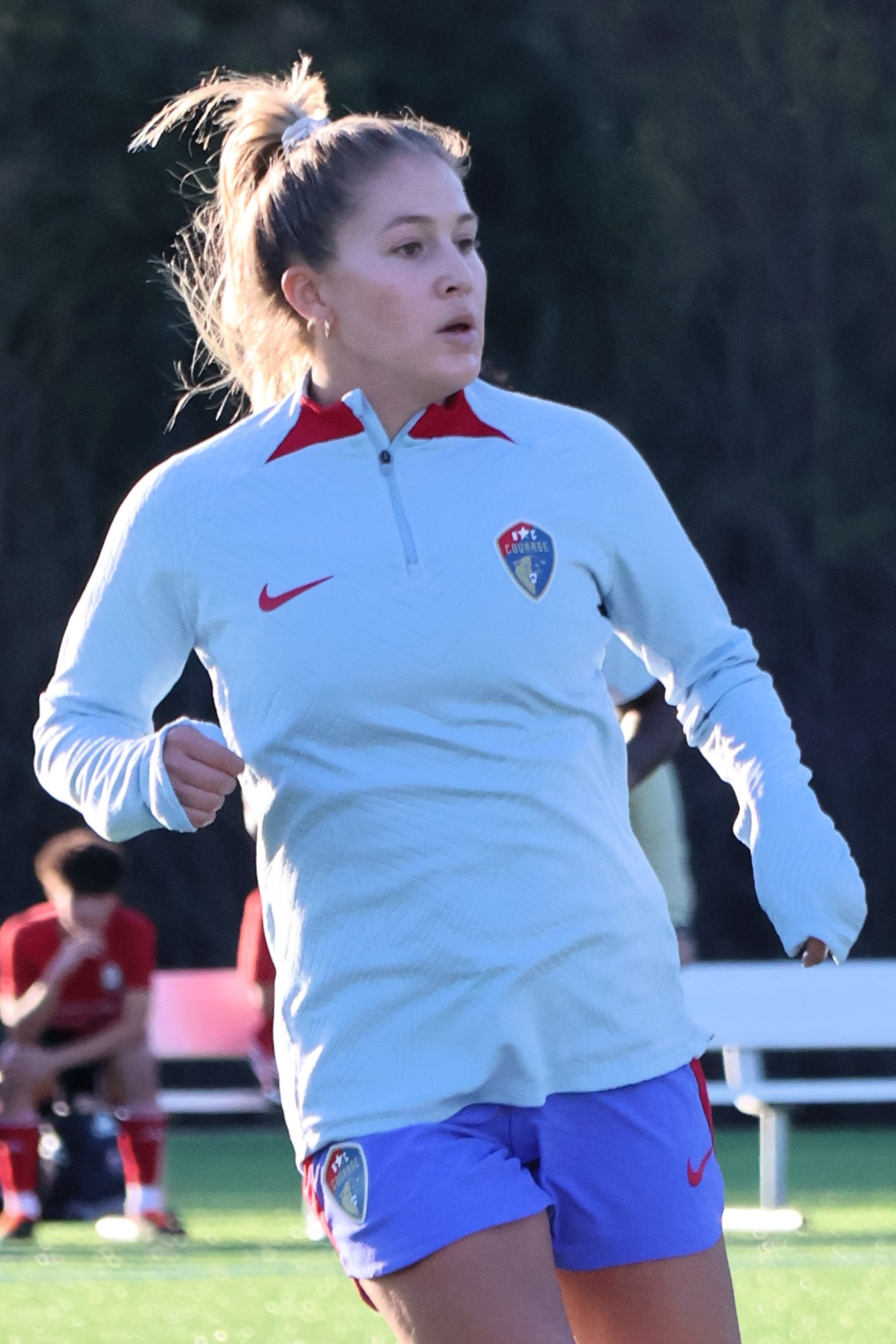
Sanchez training with the Courage in 2024

On January 12, 2024, Sanchez was traded to the North Carolina Courage during the 2024 NWSL Draft in return for the No. 5 pick and US$250,000 in allocation money. She wrote on social media that she was "shocked and heartbroken" to be leaving the Spirit. On March 16, she made her debut for the Courage as they won their season opener 5–1 against the Houston Dash. The following week, she scored her first goal for the club in a 2–1 loss to expansion team Utah Royals. On June 29, she scored the only goal against former club Washington Spirit, helping the Courage to their first road win of the season. She finished her debut season in North Carolina with 5 goals and 4 assists in 26 games, leading the team in scoring. In the playoff quarterfinals, the Courage lost 1–0 to the Kansas City Current. Sanchez was nominated for the new NWSL Midfielder of the Year award.

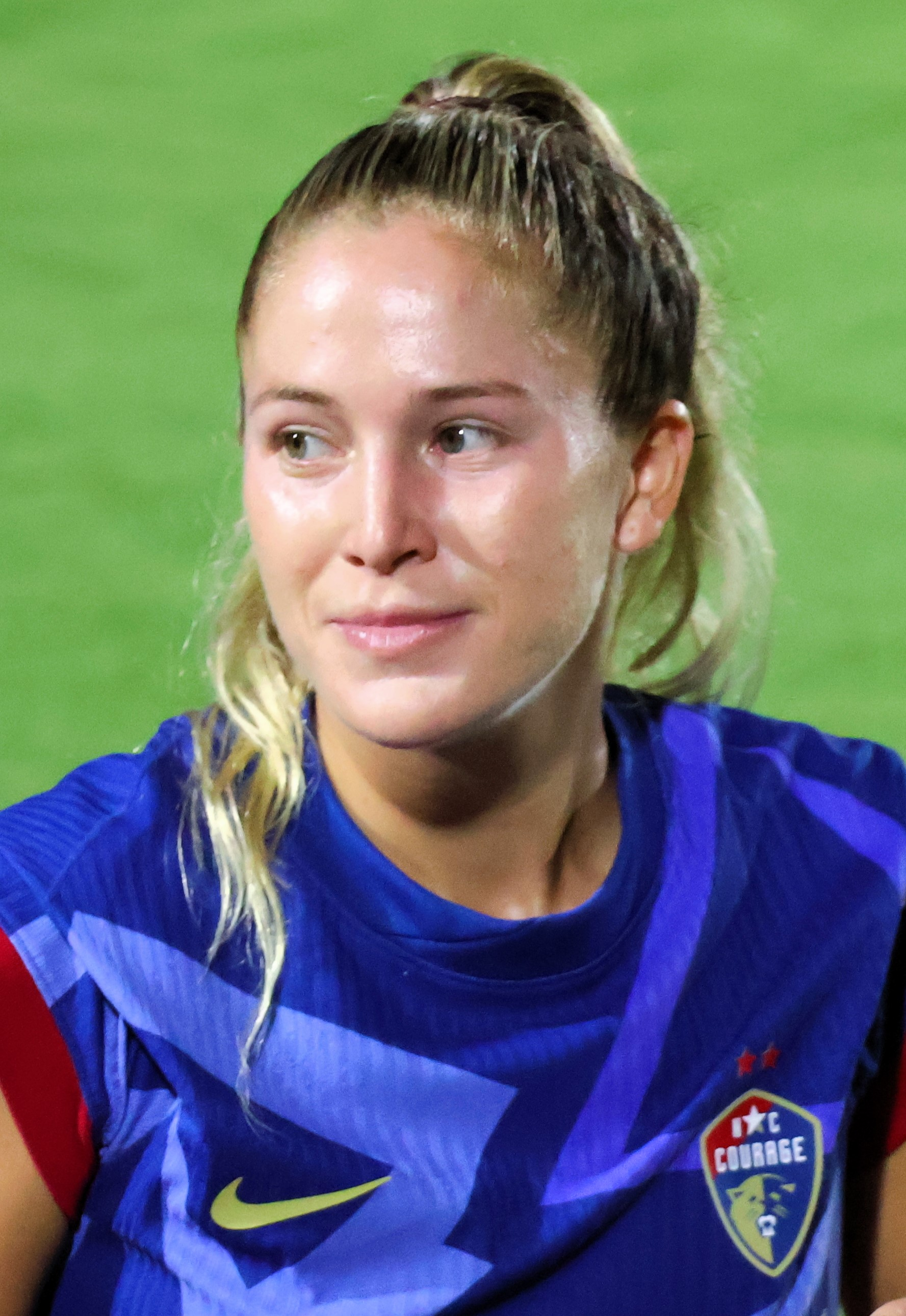
Sanchez with for the Courage in 2025

The following season, Jaedyn Shaw joined the Courage and was expected to combine with teammates Sanchez and Manaka Matsukubo, but the potential partnership never took off under head coach Sean Nahas. On April 26, 2025, Sanchez scored her first goal of the season against the Kansas City Current, scoring the 3–2 game winner in stoppage time against the unbeaten league leaders. On June 21, she made her 100th career NWSL regular-season appearance in a 2–1 win over the Houston Dash. She finished the season with 2 goals and 2 assists in 23 appearances.

On February 10, 2026, Sanchez re-signed with the Courage on a new contract running through 2027. Moved to the left wing under new head coach Mak Lind, she began the season with two goals in a 2–1 victory over Racing Louisville on March 14, earning NWSL Player of the Week. The following month, she scored in all three games as the Courage went unbeaten and was named NWSL Player of the Month for April. On July 31, she scored her tenth goal of the season in a 5–0 win against the Orlando Pride, doubling her previous career high.

In August 2026, Sanchez took the lead in the NWSL Golden Boot race and was named NWSL Player of the Month for the second time after recording five goals and two assists in six games, including the latest goal in NWSL regular-season history with the 2–1 winning penalty against expansion team Boston Legacy. On September 6, she scored her first professional hat trick in a 6–0 victory over the Chicago Stars, breaking the NWSL record for goals scored in a season by an American (previously held by Crystal Dunn and Alex Morgan). On September 27, with a penalty in a 2–1 defeat to the Utah Royals, she matched the NWSL's single-season scoring record (20 goals) set by Temwa Chawinga in 2024.

== International career ==
External videos
- The Journey: Ashley Sanchez (U.S. Soccer Federation) retrieved June 1, 2023

=== Youth national team ===
Sanchez has represented the United States on the under-14, under-15, under-17, under-20, under-23, and senior national teams. She captained the United States at the 2016 FIFA U-17 Women's World Cup and played at the 2016 FIFA U-20 Women's World Cup as well as the 2018 FIFA U-20 Women's World Cup. In 2016, Sanchez became the first player in United States history to play in multiple World Cups in the same year.

=== Senior national team ===
Sanchez received her first call-up to the senior national team in March 2016 at the age of 17. She earned her first cap on November 30, 2021, at the age of 22. In 2022, she scored three goals and notched three assists in the 731 minutes she played. She scored her first goal for the senior national team during a friendly match against Uzbekistan on April 9, 2022, followed by a second goal at their next match on April 12. These were two of four goals that she scored over a two-week stretch in four consecutive matches (the other two were with the Spirit in the 2022 Challenge Cup).

In June 2023, Sanchez was named to the U.S. squad for the 2023 FIFA Women's World Cup in Australia and New Zealand, but did not get any playing time.

In September 2026, thanks to her standout performances with North Carolina, Sanchez was called up to the USWNT for the first time in nearly two years.

== Personal life ==
Sanchez has two older siblings named Evan and Sierra. Her grandfather, John Shirk, played football for the University of Southern California (USC) Trojans. She announced her engagement to Tommy Williamson in June 2026.

=== Endorsements ===
Sanchez has an endorsement deal with Adidas. In 2022, she was featured in a commercial for Taco Bell. The campaign ran until the final day of the men's 2022 FIFA World Cup on a variety of platforms and channels.

== Career statistics ==
=== International ===
As of match played October 13, 2026

Appearances and goals by national team and year
National team	Year	Apps	Goals
United States	2021	2	0
United States	2022	15	3
United States	2023	10	0
United States	2024	1	0
United States	2025	0	0
United States	2026	2	1
Total		30	4

Scores and results list United States's goal tally first, score column indicates score after each Sanchez goal.

List of international goals scored by Ashley Sanchez
No.	Date	Venue	Opponent	Score	Result	Competition	Ref.
1	April 9, 2022	Columbus, Ohio, US	Uzbekistan	9–1	9–1	Friendly	
2	April 12, 2022	Chester, Pennsylvania, US	Uzbekistan	9–0	9–0	Friendly	
3	July 14, 2022	San Nicolás de los Garza, Mexico	Costa Rica	3–0	3–0	2022 CONCACAF W Championship	
4	October 13, 2026	Chester, Pennsylvania, US	Spain	1–2	2–2	Friendly	

== Honors and awards ==
Washington Spirit

- NWSL Championship: 2021

United States U-17

- CONCACAF Women's U-17 Championship: 2016

United States

- CONCACAF Women's Championship: 2022
- SheBelieves Cup: 2022, 2023

Individual

- U.S. Soccer Young Female Player of the Year: 2016
- NWSL Most Valuable Player: 2026
- NWSL Golden Boot: 2026
- NWSL Best XI First Team: 2026
- NWSL Challenge Cup Future Legend: 2020
- First-team All-American: 2018
- First-team All-Pac-12: 2017, 2018, 2019
- CONCACAF Women's U-17 Championship Golden Ball: 2016
- NWSL Player of the Month: April 2026, August 2026
