= Melbourne City =

Melbourne City may refer to:

== Places ==
- Melbourne, capital city of the Australian state of Victoria
- Melbourne central business district, the city centre area of metropolitan Melbourne
- City of Melbourne, the local government area comprising the Melbourne central business district and surrounds
- Melbourne, Arkansas, U.S.
- Melbourne, Florida, U.S.
- Melbourne, Iowa, U.S.
- Melbourne, Kentucky, U.S.

== Football team ==
- Melbourne City FC, professional association football team that competes in the A-League Men
- Melbourne City FC (A-League Women), women's professional association football team that competes in the A-League Women
- Melbourne City FC (1990), amateur association football team that competes in Victorian State League Division 4 West
- Melbourne City Football Club (VFA), an Australian rules football club that played in the Victorian Football Association from 1912 to 1913

== See also ==
Melbourne (disambiguation)
