= Erica Meg Parkinson =

English footballer (born 2008)

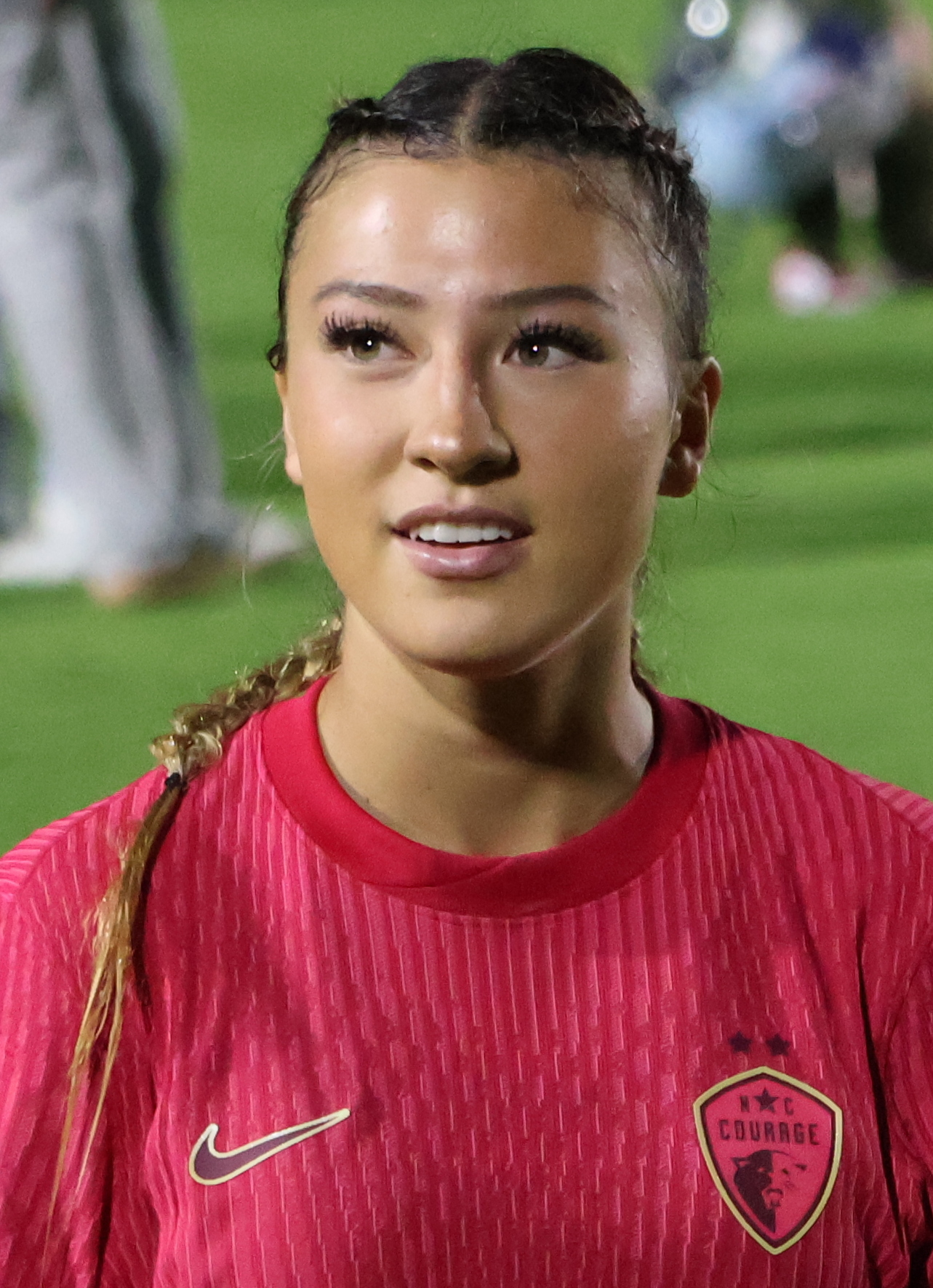
- Parkinson with the North Carolina Courage in 2026

Personal information
- Full name: Erica Meg Parkinson
- Date of birth: 18 April 2008 (age 18)
- Place of birth: Singapore
- Height: 1.60 m (5 ft 3 in)
- Position: Midfielder

Team information
- Current team: North Carolina Courage
- Number: 19

Youth career
- JSSL Singapore
- FC Foz
- 2020–2023: Leixões
- 2023–2024: Valadares Gaia

Senior career*
Years	Team	Apps	(Gls)
2023	Leixões	0	(0)
2023–2026	Valadares Gaia	52	(8)
2026–	North Carolina Courage	17	(0)

International career^{‡}
	England U16	5	(0)
2023–2024	England U17	22	(3)
2025–	England U19	14	(6)
2025–	England U23	2	(0)
2026–	England	1	(0)
- * Club domestic league appearances and goals as of 06:56, 8 November 2026 (UTC) ‡ National team caps and goals as of 9 October 2026

Erica Meg Parkinson (born 18 April 2008), also known as Erica Parkinson or Erica Meg, is a professional footballer who plays as a midfielder for the North Carolina Courage of the National Women's Soccer League (NWSL). Born in Singapore, she represents England at international level. Parkinson began her professional career with Portuguese club Valadares Gaia at age 15 in 2023.

== Early life ==
Parkinson was born on 18 April 2008 in Singapore to a Japanese mother and English father. She has a brother, Denis Parkinson, who is also a footballer. Her father, Richard, is a fan of Manchester United: Parkinson is named after Eric Cantona, and her brother after Denis Law.

Parkinson attended an international school in Singapore, and speaks four languages (English, Japanese, Portuguese, and French). The family moved to Portugal in 2018, primarily due to her brother being scouted to play in the academy at Porto.

== Youth career ==
While in Singapore, Parkinson played for JSSL Singapore. Having moved to Portugal in 2018, Parkinson, age ten, played in the seven-a-side U-11 team at FC Foz. She then joined their main academy team during the 2019–20 season, spending the season with the U-13 team.

In 2020, Parkinson moved to Leixões and began with the U-13 team before moving to the U-15 team in 2021. During the 2022–23 II Divisão Sub-15 season, she made eleven appearances and scored twice, scoring both during the 9–0 victory against Macedo de Cavaleiros U15 on 4 June 2023. She also represented Leixões at U-16 level. Parkinson was also associated with the first team in the 2022–23 Campeonato Nacional II Divisão Feminino.

== Club career ==
=== Early career: Leixões and Benfica ===
In early 2023, aged 14, Parkinson was given a senior shirt number for Leixões but did not make any appearances for the team, leaving at the age of 15 in May 2023. Parkinson also spent time with Benfica.

=== Valadares Gaia ===
Parkinson joined Valadares Gaia in July 2023 and made her debut for the senior team at the age of 15 as an 85th-minute substitute during the 3–0 victory against Damaiense in the Taça de Portugal on 3 August 2023. Her league debut came in the 2–0 loss against Braga on 17 August 2023 and she scored on her first start for the club during the 2–2 draw (later lost on penalties) against Braga in the Taça da Liga on 5 October 2023. On 2 February 2024, she scored her first league goal in the 2–0 victory against FC Famalicão.

Parkinson was permanently moved up to the senior squad on 3 May 2024 at the age of 16. She then reached the 2024–25 Taça da Liga semi-finals and won the 2024–25 AF Porto Taça. She was voted the best young player in the 2024-2025 league season by members of the Portuguese football players' union.

=== North Carolina Courage ===
On 1 July 2026, Parkinson joined National Women's Soccer League (NWSL) club North Carolina Courage, signing a four-year contract with the option for an additional year. She made her NWSL debut on 18 July, coming on as a halftime substitute for Felicitas Rauch in a 3–0 away loss to Bay FC.

== International career ==
Parkinson is eligible to play for four countries: Japan, through her mother; England, through her father; Singapore, her birth country; and Portugal, where the family moved in 2018. Parkinson has stated that she chose England as a youth player because it was the first country to invite her to a national training centre.

=== Youth ===
Parkinson made five appearances for England's U-16 side. With England U-17, she played at the 2024 Women's Under-17 Euro and 2024 U-17 Women's World Cup. In the same year, she was selected for the U-19 squad, playing at the European Championships, before receiving a call-up for the U-23 squad in 2025. She made her U-23 debut at the age of 17.

Parkinson was called up to represent England's under-20 national team at the 2026 U-20 World Cup, but withdrew on the eve of the competition to remain with the North Carolina Courage. She later described her withdrawal as "an unfortunate situation" but expressed that she was grateful for the opportunities she had received by staying with her club.

=== Senior ===
In March 2026, still aged 17, she received her first call-up to the England senior squad ahead of 2027 World Cup qualifiers against Spain and Iceland. On 9 October 2026, Parkinson made her senior England debut, coming on as an 86th-minute substitute in a 3–1 2027 World Cup qualification play-off win over Greece at Pankritio Stadium. Following her debut, she was awarded legacy number 242 by the Women's Football Association. At the time of her first appearance, Parkinson became the ninth youngest debutant for England Women's senior team (since records began in 2000).

== Personal life ==
Parkinson has worked with a mindset coach since the age of 12.

== Career statistics ==
As of match played 2 October 2026

Appearances and goals by club, season and competition
Club	Season	League			National Cup (Note: Includes Taça de Portugal)		League Cup (Note: Includes Taça da Liga)		Other		Total	
Club	Season	Division	Apps	Goals	Apps	Goals	Apps	Goals	Apps	Goals	Apps	Goals
Leixões	2022–23	Campeonato Nacional II Divisão Feminino	0	0	—		—		—		0	0
Valadares Gaia	2023–24	Campeonato Nacional de Futebol Feminino	17	0	2	0	4	1	0	0	23	1
Valadares Gaia	2024–25	Campeonato Nacional de Futebol Feminino	17	3	5	1	3	0	2 (Note: Appearance(s) in AF Porto Taça)	0	27	4
Valadares Gaia	2025–26	Campeonato Nacional de Futebol Feminino	18	5	1	0	6	1	1	0	26	6
Valadares Gaia	Total		52	8	8	1	13	2	3	0	76	11
North Carolina Courage	2026	NWSL	14	0	—		—		—		14	0
Career total			66	8	8	1	13	2	3	0	90	11

=== International ===
As of match played 9 October 2026

Appearances and goals by national team and year
National team	Year	Apps	Goals
England	2026	1	0
Total		1	0

== Honours ==
Valadares Gaia

- Taça AF Porto: 2024–25; 2025–26

Individual

- SJPF (players' union) Campeonato Nacional Feminino Best Young Player: 2024–25
- Record Campeonato Nacional Feminino Revelation of the Year: 2025–26
