= Molly Pritchard =

American soccer player (born 2003)

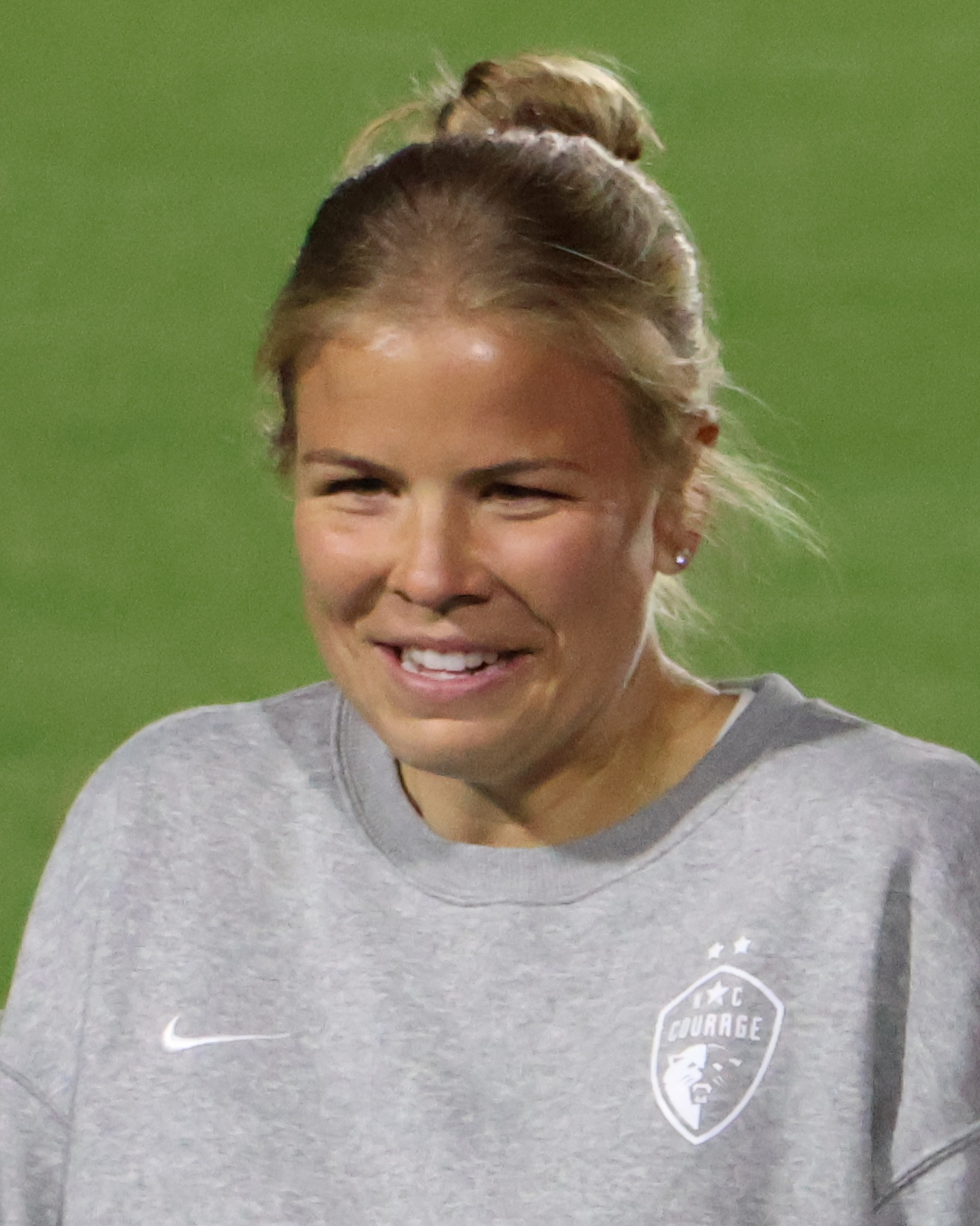
- Pritchard with the North Carolina Courage in 2026

Personal information
- Full name: Molly Evans Prtichard
- Date of birth: November 21, 2003 (age 22)
- Height: 5 ft 11 in (1.80 m)
- Position: Goalkeeper

Team information
- Current team: North Carolina Courage
- Number: 99

Youth career
- Atlanta Fire United

College career
Years	Team	Apps	(Gls)
2022–2025	Ohio State Buckeyes	85	(0)

Senior career*
Years	Team	Apps	(Gls)
2026–	North Carolina Courage	0	(0)
- * Club domestic league appearances and goals

Molly Evans Pritchard (born November 21, 2003) is an American professional soccer player who plays as a goalkeeper for the North Carolina Courage of the National Women's Soccer League (NWSL). She played college soccer for the Ohio State Buckeyes, where she was named Big Ten Goalkeeper of the Year in 2025.

== Early life ==
Pritchard grew up in Duluth, Georgia, outside of Atlanta. She was a multi-sport athlete growing up, participating in tackle football, ice hockey, baseball, and soccer before beginning to focus on soccer at around nine years old. Although she played goalkeeper in club soccer, she played primarily as a center back for Greater Atlanta Christian School in Norcross, Georgia.

Pritchard committed to Ohio State during her freshman year in 2019; both of her parents attended the university. She also played basketball at Greater Atlanta Christian, helping the team win the GHSA Class 3A state championship in 2020. At the club level, she played for Atlanta Fire United, earning ECNL All-Conference honors.

== College career ==
Pritchard enrolled at Ohio State University in January 2022. She entered her freshman season competing with graduate transfer Kat Robinson and junior Haley Roberts for the starting goalkeeper position. After beginning the season as Robinson's backup, Pritchard earned the starting role late in the season, appearing in 19 matches with seven starts as Ohio State recorded nine clean sheets. She was named to the Big Ten Conference All-Freshman Team. Ohio State advanced to the second round of the 2022 NCAA Division I women's soccer tournament.

Pritchard started all 19 matches as a sophomore in 2023, recording three solo shutouts and sharing in two others. Early in her junior season in 2024, she made a career-high 11 saves in a 1–0 victory over Duke. She started all 23 matches that season, recording four solo shutouts and three shared shutouts as Ohio State reached the round of 16 of the NCAA tournament for the fifth time in program history.

Serving as one of three team captains in 2025, Pritchard enjoyed the best season of her collegiate career. She started 21 matches, recorded ten solo shutouts and one shared shutout, and posted a career-best 0.63 goals-against average. During the season, she set an Ohio State record with seven consecutive shutouts. She also recorded two clean sheets in the NCAA tournament, including a 1–0 upset of top-seeded Notre Dame, as the Buckeyes advanced to the quarterfinals before losing to eventual national champion Florida State. At the conclusion of the season, Pritchard was named Big Ten Goalkeeper of the Year, earned first-team All-Big Ten honors, and was selected to the fourth-team United Soccer Coaches All-America team. She finished her collegiate career with a program-record 32 career shutouts in 85 appearances.

== Club career ==
On January 14, 2026, Pritchard signed her first professional contract with the North Carolina Courage, agreeing to a two-year deal through the 2027 NWSL season. She joined a goalkeeping group that included Kailen Sheridan and Madison White.

== Honors and awards ==
Individual

- Fourth-team All-American: 2025
- First-team All-Big Ten: 2025
- Big Ten Goalkeeper of the Year: 2025
- Big Ten all-freshman team: 2022
