= Bia (footballer, born 2003) =

Brazilian footballer (born 2003)

- Bia with the North Carolina Courage in 2026

Personal information
- Full name: Ana Beatriz Gomes Lopes
- Date of birth: 13 February 2003 (age 23)
- Place of birth: Sítio Novo do Tocantins, Brazil
- Height: 1.60 m (5 ft 3 in)
- Position: Right winger

Team information
- Current team: North Carolina Courage
- Number: 21

Youth career
- 2018: Audax
- 2019: Ferroviária
- 2019–2022: Internacional

Senior career*
Years	Team	Apps	(Gls)
2022	Internacional	14	(2)
2023–2024	Changchun Dazhong		
2025–2026	Zenit Saint Petersburg		
2026–	North Carolina Courage	8	(0)

International career
- Brazil U-17
- Brazil U-20
- * Club domestic league appearances and goals as of 06:50, 8 November 2026 (UTC)

Ana Beatriz Gomes Lopes (born 13 February 2003), known simply as Bia, is a Brazilian professional footballer who plays as a right winger for the North Carolina Courage of the National Women's Soccer League (NWSL).

== Club career ==
Growing up in the state of Tocantins, Bia was born in Sítio Novo and moved to Axixá at ten years old. She joined Audax in São Paulo at age 15, before moving to Ferroviária and then Internacional, where she won the Campeonato Brasileiro Feminino Sub-20. She was promoted to Internacional's first team at age 19, scoring in her league debut on 13 March 2022. She made 28 appearances and scored 5 goals during her only year with the professional side.

Bia joined Chinese club Changchun Dazhong in 2023, where she played two seasons. She made 47 appearances and scored 10 goals for the club.

On 15 January 2025, Russian club Zenit Saint Petersburg announced the signing of Bia. She made 28 appearances and scored 3 goals during two seasons with the club.

On 4 September 2026, the National Women's Soccer League (NWSL)'s North Carolina Courage announced the signing of Bia on a two-year contract with the option for another year.

== International career ==
Bia was part of the Brazil U-20 squad that won the 2022 South American Under-20 Women's Football Championship.

== Honors ==
Brazil U-20

- South American Under-20 Women's Football Championship: 2022
