= Gianna Paul =

American soccer player (born 2004)

- Paul with the North Carolina Courage in 2026

Personal information
- Full name: Gianna Rose Paul
- Date of birth: December 28, 2004 (age 21)
- Place of birth: New York
- Height: 5 ft 10 in (1.78 m)
- Position: Forward

Team information
- Current team: North Carolina Courage
- Number: 23

Youth career
- SUSA FC

College career
Years	Team	Apps	(Gls)
2022–2025	Alabama Crimson Tide	90	(40)

Senior career*
Years	Team	Apps	(Gls)
2024–2025	Long Island Rough Riders	13	(14)
2026	Kansas City Current	10	(0)
2026–	North Carolina Courage	6	(1)
- * Club domestic league appearances and goals as of 06:56, November 8, 2026 (UTC)

Gianna Rose Paul (born December 28, 2004) is an American professional soccer player who plays as a forward for the North Carolina Courage of the National Women's Soccer League (NWSL). She played college soccer for the Alabama Crimson Tide, earning All-American honors twice and setting a program record with 40 career goals. She began her professional career with the Kansas City Current in 2026.

== Early life ==
Paul grew up in Huntington Station, New York, on Long Island. She took after her older sister and began playing soccer when she was five. She played two seasons of soccer at Walt Whitman High School, earning All-American honors as a senior. She also ran track in high school and won two state titles and was named All-American in the sport. She committed to Alabama in her junior year. She played club soccer for SUSA FC, earning multiple ECNL all-conference honors.

== College career ==
Paul was an "electric" substitute during her freshman season with the Alabama Crimson Tide in 2022. In the NCAA tournament, she shook off a goal slump in the quarterfinals when she opened the scoring against Duke, leading Alabama to the first NCAA semifinal appearance in program history. She had 8 goals and 5 assists in 27 games and was named the SEC Freshman of the Year and second-team All-SEC. TopDrawerSoccer named her the fifth-best freshman in the country. In her sophomore year in 2023, she began the season with 7 goals in 10 games, but after suffering an ankle injury, she scored only once more in 11 games. She was named first-team All-SEC.

Paul started all 21 games and led the Crimson Tide with 12 goals in her junior season in 2024. She was named first-team All-SEC and fourth-team All-American, joining Reyna Reyes, Riley Parker, and Felicia Knox as the fourth All-American selection in program history. During her senior season, she became the top scorer in Alabama program history, surpassing Libby Probst's mark of 33 career goals. She again scored 12 goals and added a career-high 7 assists in 21 games as a senior in 2025, repeating her first-team All-SEC and fourth-team All-American selections. She finished her college career with 40 goals and 14 assists in 90 games played.

During college, she also played for the Long Island Rough Riders in the USL W League, helping the team to the national quarterfinals in 2024.

== Club career ==
=== Kansas City Current ===
The Kansas City Current announced on December 26, 2025, that they had signed Paul to her first professional contract on a three-year deal with the club option for another year. She made her professional debut on the opening matchday, coming on as a late substitute for Ally Sentnor in a 2–1 win over the Utah Royals. She made her first professional start two weeks later, playing 63 minutes in a 3–0 loss to the Seattle Reign. Soon later, she missed three months due to a thigh injury. She made 10 appearances for the Current.

=== North Carolina Courage ===
On September 16, 2026, Paul was traded to the North Carolina Courage for US$150,000 in intraleague transfer funds. She debuted for the club three days later, starting in a 2–1 loss to league leaders Gotham FC. She scored her first professional goal on October 2, the only goal of the game to give the Courage their first road win over the Seattle Reign in eight years.

== International career ==
Paul was called into training camp with the United States under-18/under-19 team in 2023.

== Honors and awards ==
Individual

- Fourth-team All-American: 2024, 2025
- First-team All-SEC: 2023, 2024, 2025
- Second-team All-SEC: 2022
- SEC Freshman of the Year: 2022
