= Mak Lind =

Association football player and manager (born 1988)

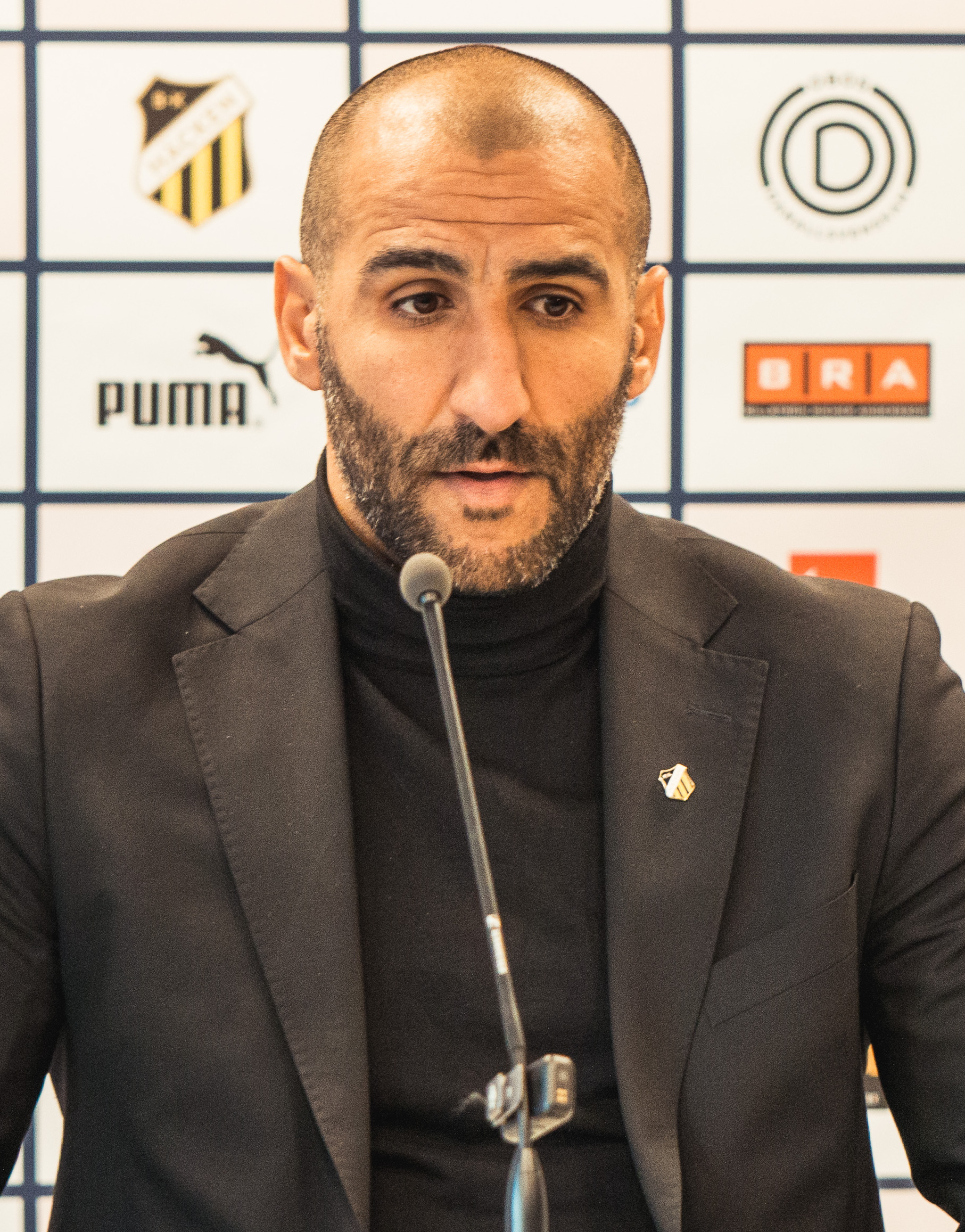
- Lind in 2025

Personal information
- Full name: Mak Adam Lind
- Birth name: Mohammed Ali Khan
- Date of birth: 1 November 1988 (age 38)
- Place of birth: Beirut, Lebanon
- Height: 1.79 m (5 ft 10 in)
- Position: Centre-back

Team information
- Current team: North Carolina Courage (head coach)

Youth career
- 1993–2003: Västra Frölunda IF

Senior career*
Years	Team	Apps	(Gls)
2003–2008	Västra Frölunda IF	93	(12)
2009–2014	BK Häcken	71	(1)
2014	Tianjin TEDA	17	(1)
2015–2016	Halmstads BK	37	(0)
2018	Tynnered FC	14	(15)
2019–2020	Byttorps IF	17	(25)
2020	Nova FC	7	(6)

International career
2013–2015	Lebanon	10	(0)

Managerial career
- 2016: Västra Frölunda IF
- 2017: Husqvarna FF
- 2018–2022: Norrby IF
- 2023: FC Trollhättan
- 2023–2025: BK Häcken FF (women)
- 2026–: North Carolina Courage (women)
- * Club domestic league appearances and goals

Mak Adam Lind (né Mohammed Ali Khan, Arabic: محمد علي خان; born 1 November 1988) is a professional football coach and former player who is the head coach of the North Carolina Courage of the National Women's Soccer League (NWSL).

Born in Lebanon, Lind moved to Sweden and obtained Swedish citizenship. He represented Lebanon internationally between 2013 and 2015.

== Early life ==
Lind was born in Beirut, Lebanon, to Lebanese parents of Mhallami origin, and immigrated with his parents and eight siblings to Sweden via Gelsenkirchen, Germany in 1991.

Until 2013 Lind had believed that he was born in 1986, but after locating his original Lebanese birth certificate it was discovered that he was actually born in 1988 and had made his Superettan first-team debut at the age of 15.

== Club career ==
In 2008, Lind joined BK Häcken from Västra Frölunda IF; he played six years at the club, and was eventually made club captain. Lind then played for Tianjin TEDA in China, before joining Halmstads BK, with whom he retired from professional football in 2016.

== International career ==
Lind cited the death of his mother as the main reasons for accepting the Lebanon national team call up in 2013, stating: "Mom loved her people and her country. Lebanon was home to her and I know she would have wanted me to represent the country. So I did it for her." He made his debut on 6 September, in which Lebanon won 2–0 in Beirut against Syria.

== Managerial career ==
On 2 March 2016, it was confirmed that Lind was the new manager of Västra Frölunda IF in Division 3 (tier 5). He still continued to play for Halmstads BK. But after only two matches in the charge of the club, he was forced to terminate his contract on 10 March 2016, because Halmstad didn't want him to play and coach at the same time.

Lind was appointed as the new manager of Division 1 (tier 3) club Husqvarna FF for the 2017 season on 28 November 2016. After the death of Husqvarna's sporting director, Issa Iskander, Lind took over this role as well.

On 15 December 2017, Lind was announced as the new manager of Norrby IF in the Superettan (tier 2) for the 2018 season. On 23 October 2019, Norrby IF extended his contract to 2022. Following Norrby's relegation from the Superettan in 2022, Lind left the club and, on 25 November 2022, was appointed head coach and sporting director of Ettan (tier 3) side FC Trollhättan for the 2023 season.

On 1 July 2023, Lind was appointed head coach of BK Häcken in the Damallsvenskan, the top women's division in Sweden, until the 2026 season. He led the club to their second league title in 2025 before leaving at the end of the year.

On 24 January 2026, Lind was named head coach of the National Women's Soccer League (NWSL) club North Carolina Courage, becoming the team's third permanent head coach in franchise history.

== Personal life ==
Lind and his wife, Fermisk, have two daughters, Donya and Diana. Three months after Donya's birth, who had Down syndrome, Lind founded the organization Göteborgs Downfamilj (Gothenburg Down Family).

Born Mohammed Ali Khan, in 2019 he changed his name to Mak Adam Lind. The name "Mak" derives from the initials of his previous name. He decided to change his name to distance himself from the Ali Khan criminal network and his family.

== Honours ==
BK Häcken FF (manager)

- Damallsvenskan: 2025

Individual

- IFFHS All-time Lebanon Men's Dream Team
