= Evelyn Ijeh =

Swedish footballer (born 2001)

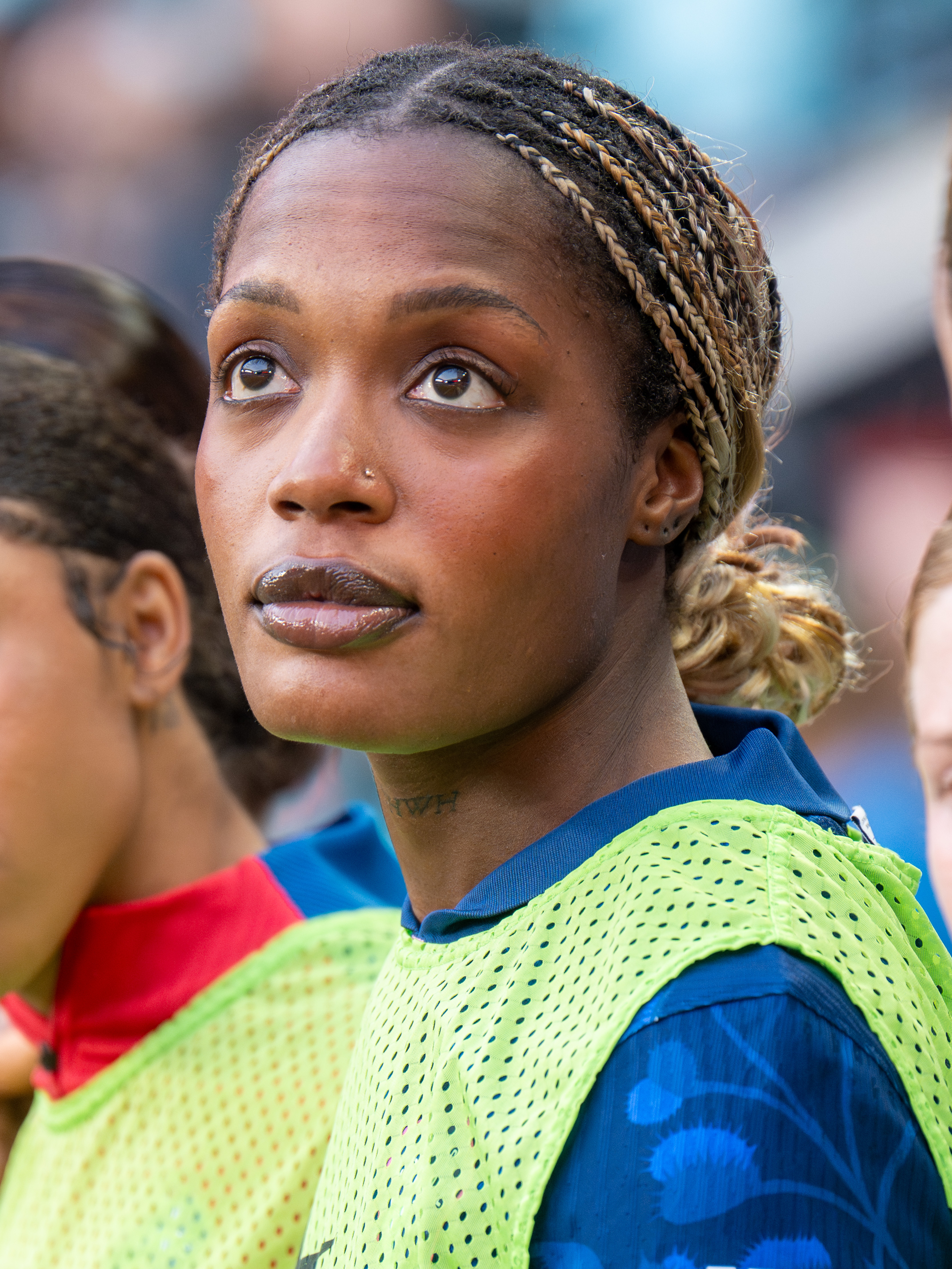
- Ijeh with the North Carolina Courage in 2026

Personal information
- Date of birth: 12 August 2001 (age 25)
- Place of birth: Malmö, Sweden
- Height: 1.75 m (5 ft 9 in)
- Position: Forward

Team information
- Current team: North Carolina Courage
- Number: 10

Senior career*
Years	Team	Apps	(Gls)
2017–2020	Kopparbergs/Göteborg FC	11	(0)
2021	BK Häcken	10	(1)
2021	Lidköpings FK	12	(6)
2022–2023	Växjö DFF	42	(32)
2023–2024	Tigres UANL	7	(0)
2024	→ AC Milan (loan)	12	(3)
2024–2025	AC Milan	35	(16)
2026–	North Carolina Courage	29	(11)

International career^{‡}
2018	Sweden U17		
2018–2020	Sweden U19		
2021–2025	Sweden U23	21	(14)
2024–	Sweden	10	(2)
- * Club domestic league appearances and goals as of 06:53, 8 November 2026 (UTC) ‡ National team caps and goals as of 14 October 2026

Evelyn Ijeh (born 12 August 2001) is a Swedish professional footballer who plays as a forward for the North Carolina Courage of the National Women's Soccer League (NWSL) and the Sweden national team. Ijeh began her career with IFK Göteborg, BK Häcken, Lidköpings FK, and Växjö DFF in her native Sweden. She signed with Mexican club Tigres UANL in 2023, before joining Italian club AC Milan initially on loan the following year.

== Club career ==
Ijeh started playing football at the age of ten. She started her career with Swedish side IFK Göteborg, where she debuted for the club during a 3–1 loss to Hammarby.

On 2 February 2024, Ijeh signed on a loan deal with AC Milan for the rest of the 2023–24 season. On 3 July 2024, Ijeh signed on a permanent deal with AC Milan until 30 June 2027.

On 23 January 2026, Ijeh joined the NWSL's North Carolina Courage on a transfer from AC Milan and signed a four-year contract with the club. On 16 May, she scored her first NWSL goal in a 4–0 win over the Chicago Stars. On 31 July, she scored her first NWSL hat trick in a 5–0 victory over the Orlando Pride.

== International career ==
Ijeh was first called up to the national team in June 2024 to play matches against France and England in the UEFA Women's Euro 2025 qualifying. She started in her first senior game against France in Dijon, where Sweden lost 2–1. Four days later, she came on as a sub for Madelen Janogy before the second half started against England in Gothenburg, a match that ended in a 0–0 draw.

In 2024, she became cap-tied to Sweden, her country of birth. Despite training with the Super Falcons in Vienna, Austria in 2021, she is now ineligible to represent Nigeria.

== Style of play ==
Ijeh mainly operates as a striker and has been described as "played in all positions, even goalkeeper as a child. And in F19, Evelyn Ijeh shifted between being left back and center back".

== Personal life ==
Ijeh is the sister of Swedish footballer Josephine Ijeh and daughter of Peter Ijeh. She sees her father as her biggest motivator. Her father was a former international player for Nigeria and also played for Viking FC in Norway.

== Career statistics ==
No.	Date	Venue	Opponent	Score	Result	Competition
1.	25 October 2024	Stade Émile Mayrisch, Esch-sur-Alzette, Luxembourg	Luxembourg	4–0	4–0	UEFA Women's Euro 2025 qualifying play-offs
2.	2 December 2025	Nationalarenan, Solna, Sweden	France	1–1	2–2 (a.e.t.)	2025 UEFA Women's Nations League 3rd
