= Carly Wickenheiser =

Canadian soccer player (born 1997)

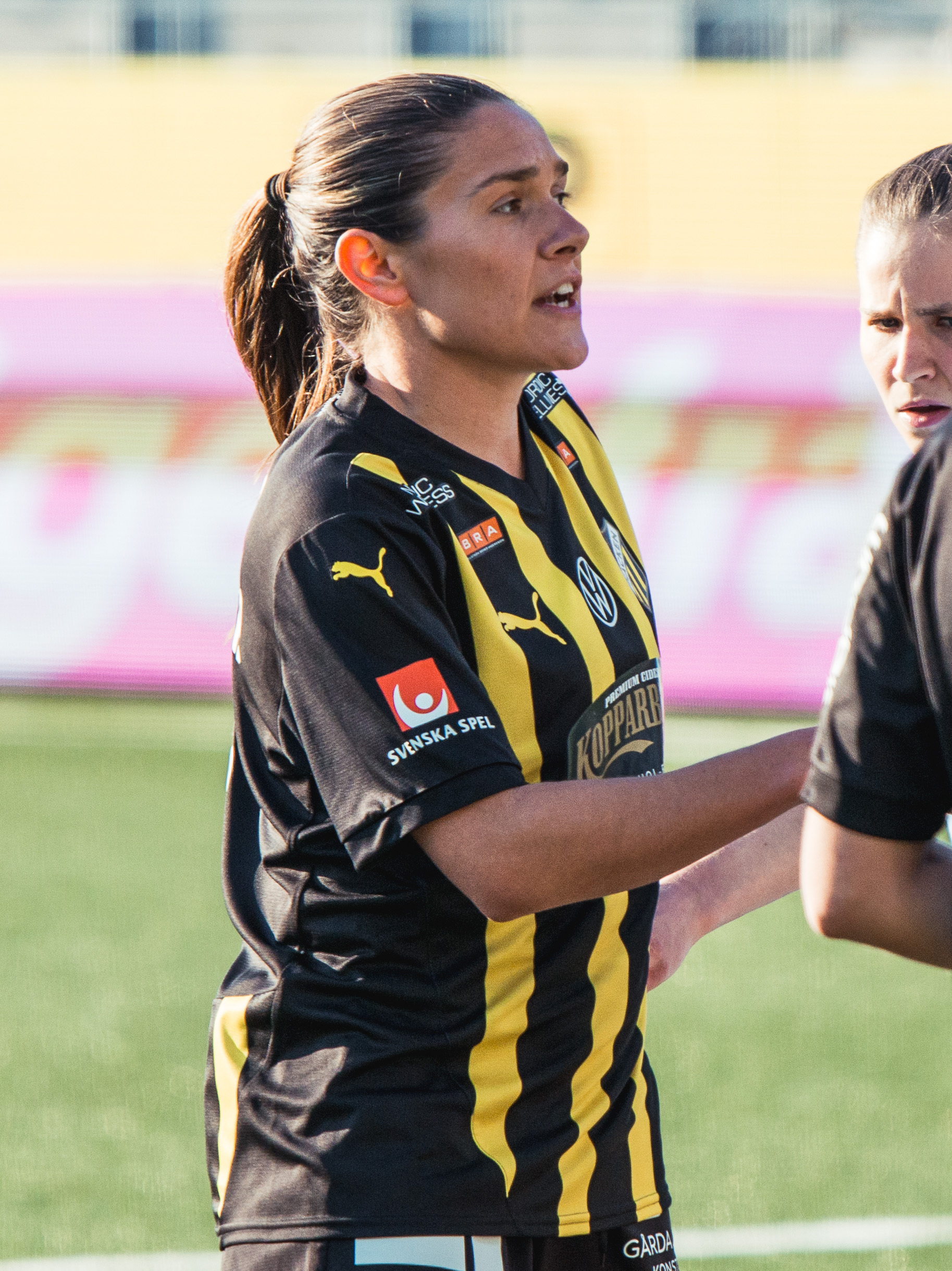
- Wickenheiser with BK Häcken in 2025

Personal information
- Full name: Mary Caroline Wickenheiser
- Date of birth: June 3, 1997 (age 29)
- Place of birth: St. Louis, Missouri, United States
- Height: 1.68 m (5 ft 6 in)
- Position: Midfielder

Team information
- Current team: North Carolina Courage
- Number: 14

Youth career
- Lou Fusz Athletic SC

College career
Years	Team	Apps	(Gls)
2015–2018	Texas Tech Red Raiders	83	(4)

Senior career*
Years	Team	Apps	(Gls)
2019–2020	Morön BK	48	(5)
2021–2022	KIF Örebro	46	(0)
2023–2024	Kristianstad	50	(2)
2025	BK Häcken	23	(4)
2026–	North Carolina Courage	25	(0)

International career^{‡}
2025–	Canada	8	(0)
- * Club domestic league appearances and goals as of 06:59, November 8, 2026 (UTC) ‡ National team caps and goals as of October 12, 2026

Mary Caroline Wickenheiser (born June 3, 1997) is a professional soccer player who plays as a midfielder for the North Carolina Courage of the National Women's Soccer League (NWSL). Born in the United States, she plays for the Canada national team. She played college soccer for the Texas Tech Red Raiders.

== Early life ==
Wickenheiser played youth soccer with Lou Fusz Athletic SC. She attended St. Joseph's Academy and was an All-Metro selection in her senior year.

== College career ==
In 2015, Wickenheiser began attending Texas Tech University, where she played for the women's soccer team. In 2016, she earned Academic All-Big 12 Second Team honours. In 2017 and 2018, she earned First Team Academic All-Big 12 honours. She served as team captain in both 2017 and 2018.

== Club career ==
In February 2019, she joined Morön BK in the Swedish second tier Elitettan. After the season, she re-signed with the club for the 2020 season. However, in 2020, her return to Sweden was delayed due to the COVID-19 pandemic, with her being denied entry to Sweden four times.

In December 2020, she signed with first tier Damallsvenskan club KIF Örebro. In October 2021, she extended her contract for another season.

In November 2022, Wickenheiser signed with Kristianstad on a two-year contract beginning in 2023. She served as a team captain and scored her first league goal for the club on September 14, 2024 in a 4-1 victory over AIK.

In December 2024, Wickenheiser signed with Damallsvenskan club BK Häcken on a two-year contract.

In January 2026, Wickenheiser transferred to the North Carolina Courage for an undisclosed fee, signing a two-year contract.

== International career ==
Born in the United States, Wickenheiser is eligible to represent Canada and the United States.

In February 2025, she received her first call up to Canada for the 2025 Pinatar Cup. She earned her first senior cap on February 19, 2025 against China. She helped the team win the gold medal at the tournament.

== Personal life ==
Wickenheiser is the daughter of former National Hockey League player Doug Wickenheiser, who died of cancer when she was 20 months old, and cousin of former Canadian national team player and Hockey Hall of Fame inductee Hayley Wickenheiser. Wickenheiser is a devout Catholic.

== Honours ==
BK Häcken

- Damallsvenskan: 2025
