= Lauryn Thompson =

English footballer (born 2007)

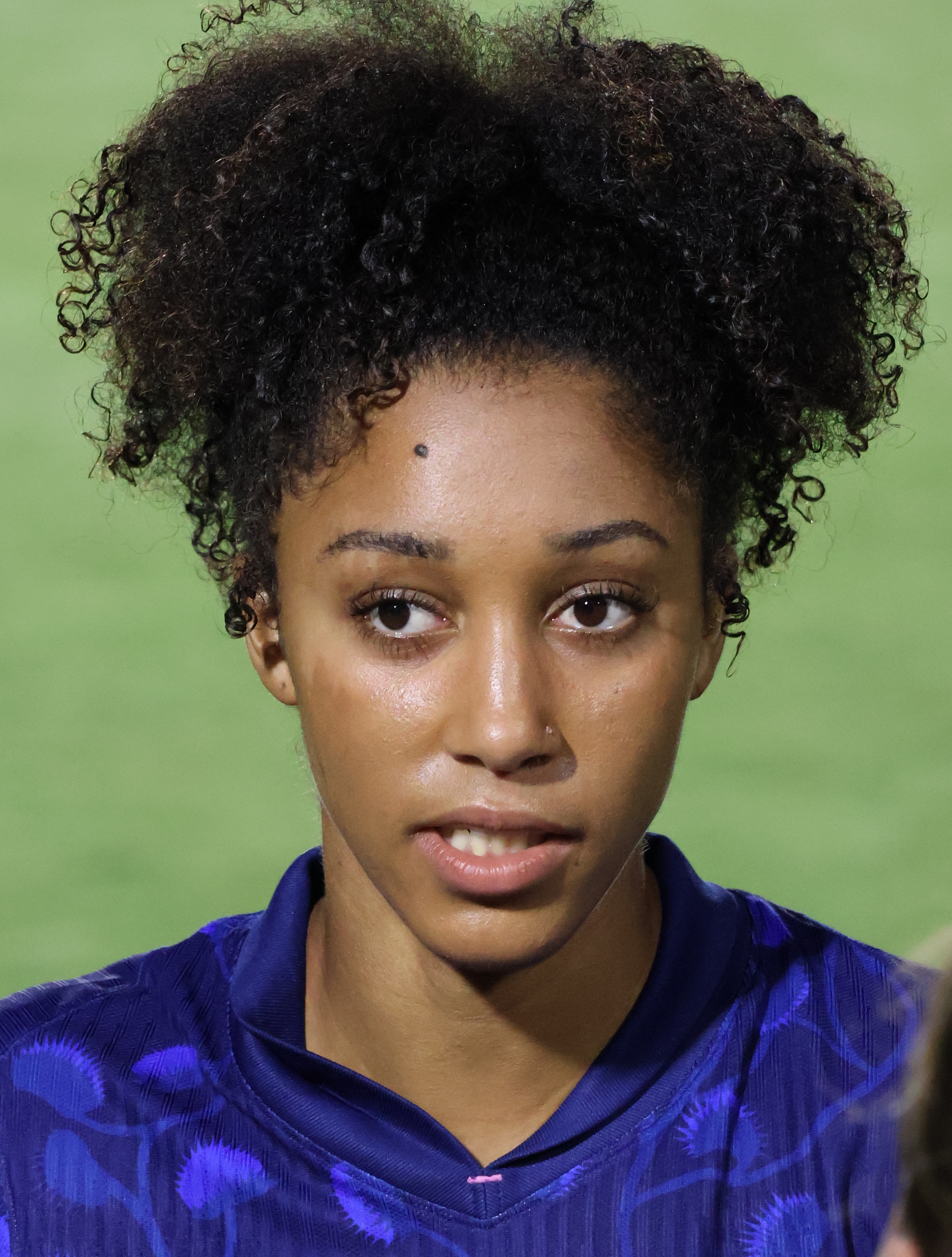
- Thompson with the North Carolina Courage in 2026

Personal information
- Full name: Lauryn Ida Belle Thompson
- Date of birth: 4 November 2007 (age 19)
- Height: 5 ft 5 in (1.65 m)
- Position: Forward

Team information
- Current team: North Carolina Courage
- Number: 7

Youth career
- 2017–2020: Indy Eleven
- 2020–2023: North Carolina Courage
- 2023–2025: Indy Eleven

Senior career*
Years	Team	Apps	(Gls)
2024	Indy Eleven	2	(0)
2026–	North Carolina Courage	12	(1)

International career^{‡}
2024	England U-17	3	(1)
2025–	England U-19	11	(2)
- * Club domestic league appearances and goals as of 06:58, 8 November 2026 (UTC) ‡ National team caps and goals as of 28 October 2025

Lauryn Ida Belle Thompson (born 4 November 2007) is a professional footballer who plays as a right winger for the North Carolina Courage of the National Women's Soccer League (NWSL). She represented England at the 2024 FIFA U-17 Women's World Cup.

== Early life ==
Thompson grew up in Wake Forest, North Carolina. After three years with the Indy Eleven Academy, she played for the North Carolina Courage Academy, where she was named ECNL all-conference multiple times. In 2023, she helped the Courage win the U19 Girls Elite USL Academy Cup and was named the tournament's best young player at age 15. She returned to the Indy Eleven later that year, helping the U17s to the ECNL national semifinals. Before going pro, she was committed to play college soccer for the Florida State Seminoles.

== Club career ==
On 8 December 2025, the National Women's Soccer League (NWSL)'s North Carolina Courage announced that they had signed Thompson to her first professional contract on a four-year deal. She made her professional debut on 14 March 2026 as a second-half substitute for Hannah Betfort in a season-opening 2–1 win over Racing Louisville. On 31 July, in just her second start, she scored her first professional goal in the fourth minute against the Orlando Pride; she also had an assist in the match, which the Courage won 5–0.

== International career ==
Eligible to represent the United States or England, Thompson was called into training camps with the United States under-15s and under-16s in 2022 and 2023. She then joined the England youth set-up and was included in the roster for the 2024 FIFA U-17 Women's World Cup in the Dominican Republic. She scored in the opening 2–0 win over Kenya and played in all three group stage games. She was injured in the last group game and missed the rest of the tournament as the Young Lionesses finished fourth.
