= Shinomi Koyama =

Japanese footballer (born 2005)

Shinomi Koyama 小山 史乃観
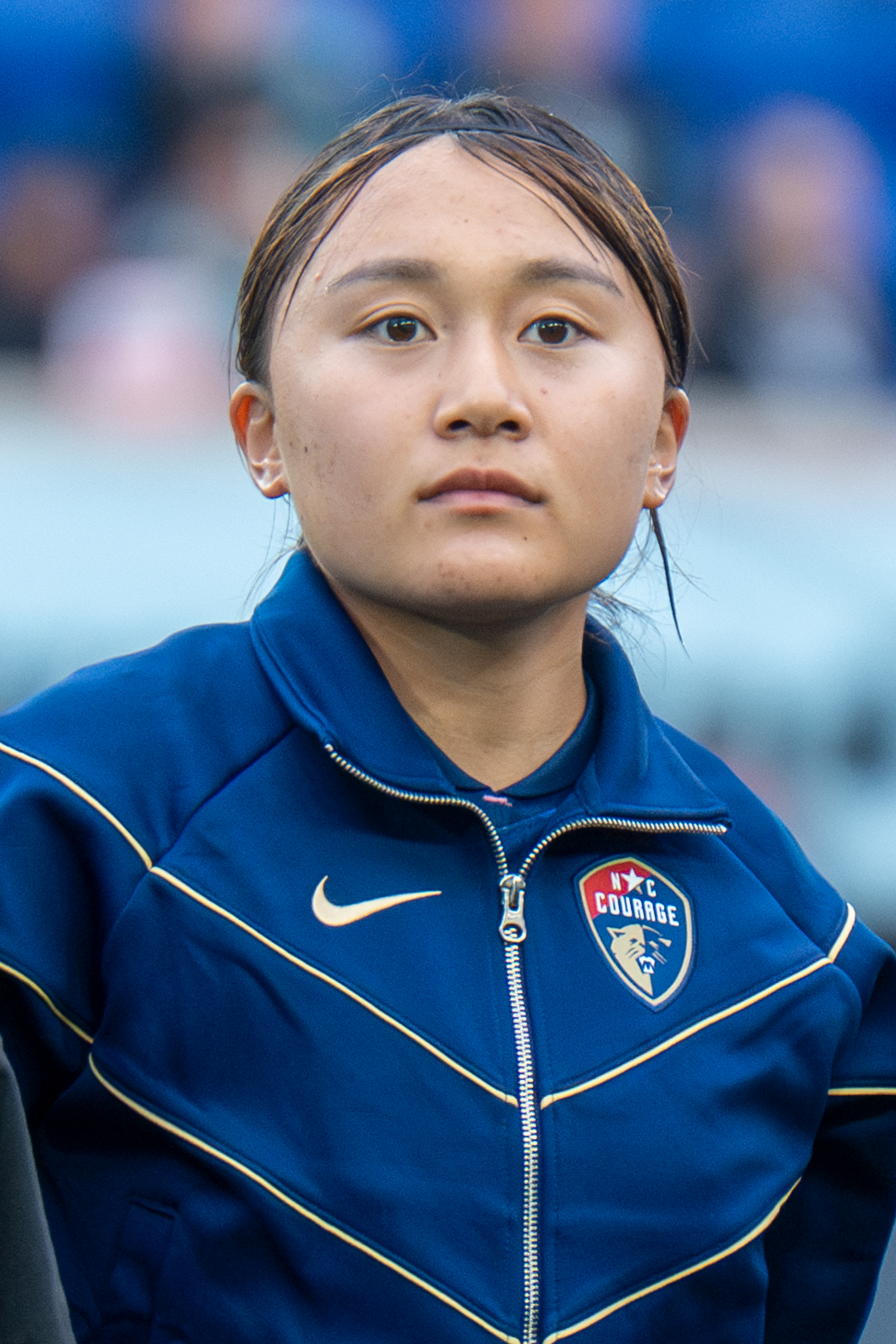
- Koyama with the North Carolina Courage in 2026

Personal information
- Date of birth: 31 January 2005 (age 21)
- Place of birth: Osaka, Japan
- Height: 1.60 m (5 ft 3 in)
- Position: Midfielder

Team information
- Current team: North Carolina Courage
- Number: 20

Senior career*
Years	Team	Apps	(Gls)
2018–2023	Cerezo Osaka Yanmar Ladies	68	(24)
2023	→ INAC Kobe Leonessa (loan)	13	(2)
2024	Djurgårdens IF	21	(4)
2025–	North Carolina Courage	55	(4)

International career^{‡}
	Japan U-20	20	(3)
2022–	Japan	1	(0)
- * Club domestic league appearances and goals as of 06:55, 8 November 2026 (UTC) ‡ National team caps and goals as of 26 October 2024

Shinomi Koyama (小山 史乃観, Koyama Shinomi; born 31 January 2005) is a Japanese professional footballer who plays as a midfielder for the North Carolina Courage of the National Women's Soccer League (NWSL) and the Japan national team.

== Club career ==
On 31 January 2024, Koyama joined Swedish top-tier team Djurgårdens IF from Cerezo Osaka Yanmar Ladies on a three-year deal.

In January 2025, Koyama joined the North Carolina Courage for an undisclosed fee, signing a three-year contract. The move united her with youth international teammate Manaka Matsukubo. She scored her first NWSL goal in the 89th minute to grab a 1–0 win over the Orlando Pride on 19 September 2025.

== International career ==
Koyama made her senior international debut for Japan on 9 October 2022, coming on as a late substitute for Jun Endō in a 2–0 friendly win against New Zealand.

Koyama captained Japan U20 to a runner-up finish at the 2024 FIFA U-20 Women's World Cup.
