= North Carolina Courage =

American professional women's soccer team in North Carolina

- Nickname: Lioness
- Founded: January 9, 2017; 9 years ago
- Stadium: WakeMed Soccer Park; Cary, North Carolina
- Capacity: 10,000
- Owners: Steve Malik; Capitol Broadcasting Company; Jrue & Lauren Holiday; Naomi Osaka
- Chairman: Steve Malik
- Head coach: Mak Lind
- League: National Women's Soccer League
- 2026: Regular season: 9th of 16; Playoffs: DNQ
- Website: nccourage.com
Home colors	Away colors	Third colors

The North Carolina Courage are an American professional soccer team based in Cary, North Carolina, that competes in the National Women's Soccer League (NWSL). It was founded on January 9, 2017, after Stephen Malik acquired NWSL franchise rights from the Western New York Flash. The Courage plays its home games at WakeMed Soccer Park.

In 2018, the Courage became the first team in NWSL history to win the Shield and the Championship in the same season. In 2019, the team became the first team to win the Championship on its home field.

== History ==
=== 2017 ===
On January 9, 2017, the North Carolina Courage announced their formation as the relocated Western New York Flash, with a new home of Cary, North Carolina. The Courage officially hired Paul Riley, the Flash's coach prior to relocation, on January 30, 2017. The team played their first match, on April 15, 2017, against the Washington Spirit, and won 1–0 with a goal by McCall Zerboni. The Courage went on to win the 2017 NWSL Shield and advanced to the 2017 NWSL Championship after defeating the Chicago Red Stars 1–0 in the semifinals, but fell 1–0 to the Portland Thorns in the finals.

=== 2018 ===
In 2018, the Courage had the best season in NWSL history, losing just one of 26 games played during the season. The Courage also participated in and won the inaugural Women's International Champions Cup. Heather O'Reilly scored the only goal in the victory over Olympique Lyon. After clinching the NWSL Shield, the team defeated the Portland Thorns in the 2018 NWSL Championship 3–0. Jessica McDonald was named the NWSL Championship MVP after scoring two goals in the match.

=== 2019 ===
The Courage returned to the Women's International Champions Cup finals, but were defeated by returning finalists Olympique Lyon. The Courage were crowned NWSL Champions for the second consecutive season after defeating the Chicago Red Stars, 4–0 in the 2019 NWSL Championship held in Cary, North Carolina. Debinha was named the NWSL Championship MVP after scoring the fastest goal in NWSL Championship history. The team clinched the NWSL Shield for the third time in as many years on September 21 after defeating Utah Royals FC. The team had an overall record of 15–5–4.

=== 2020 ===
With the NWSL season cancelled due to the COVID-19 pandemic, the Courage participated in the inaugural 2020 NWSL Challenge Cup. They were defeated in the semifinals by Portland Thorns. The Courage also participated in the 2020 NWSL Fall Series, finishing in fifth place.

=== 2021 ===
On January 28, 2021, the club announced that professional tennis player Naomi Osaka had made an investment in the team. Osaka stated that she was inspired to take part ownership by those who had invested in her during her career, and that she wishes to "continue the legacy of women empowerment."

The Courage failed to qualify for the 2021 NWSL Challenge Cup championship, falling one point short in the East Division to NJ/NY Gotham FC.

==== NWSL abuse scandal ====
On September 30, 2021, the club fired head coach Paul Riley after news of prior sexual abuse allegations emerged against him. The Courage replaced Riley with assistant Sean Nahas in the interim.

=== 2022 ===
On December 1, 2021, the Courage named former interim head coach Sean Nahas as head coach for the 2022 season.

The Courage won the East Division of the 2022 NWSL Challenge Cup group stage, then defeated Kansas City Current in the knockout stage and Washington Spirit in the championship to win the tournament for the first time.

The Courage spent the first half of the 2022 season in last place, winning only two of its first 12 matches, losing six, and drawing four. Despite rallying to seven wins, two losses, and one draw in its final 10 matches of the season, the Courage finished the season in 7th place, behind Chicago Red Stars by one point, and missed the playoffs for the first time in its history.

=== 2023 ===
In 2023, the Courage were on top of the league standings in July but finished the season in 3rd place, falling in the first round of the playoffs to eventual champions Gotham. Forward Kerolin scored 10 goals and was named the NWSL MVP. The Courage won the NWSL Challenge Cup for the second year in a row.

=== 2024 ===
The Courage finished fifth in the standings, losing in the first round of the playoffs to the Kansas City Current. They finished atop their group in the NWSL x Liga MX Feminil Summer Cup, falling to Kansas City in the semifinals. Ashley Sanchez, who was acquired via trade during the 2024 NWSL Draft, led the team with 5 goals and 4 assists, while Kaleigh Kurtz was named to the NWSL Best XI.

=== 2025 ===
The Courage had a tumultuous season. They both acquired, and then sold, USWNT midfielder Jaedyn Shaw. On August 6th, with the team in ninth place in the table, the Courage fired head coach Sean Nahas for a "multitude of factors" and named Nathan Thackeray acting head coach. The Courage finished the season in ninth place, one point outside of the playoffs. Manaka Matsukubo led the team with 11 goals and 4 assists, and was named NWSL Midfielder of the Year and to the NWSL Best XI.

== Team name, crest, and colors ==
The team's name is a nod to the original Carolina Courage – who won the 2002 Women's United Soccer Association (WUSA) Founders Cup – as is the stylized lioness image, which matches the head of the lioness on the WUSA team's badge with very minor alterations. The badge features elements from the flag of North Carolina with both the star and the color scheme, the latter keeping in line with the NCFC brand. The lower right point of the star represents the Research Triangle, a geographical region that includes Chapel Hill, Durham, and Raleigh. The Courage's primary colors include "Atlantic blue", "cardinal red," and "Southern gold."

=== Uniform evolution ===
Home

2017	2018	2019	2020	2021	2022-23	2024-25

Away

2017	2018–2019	2020	2021–22	2023	2024	2025-

=== Sponsorship ===
Period	Kit manufacturer	Sponsor
2017	(United States) Nike	BlueCross BlueShield of NC
2018–2022	(United States) Nike	Continental
2023–present	(United States) Nike	Merz Aesthetics

== Stadium ==
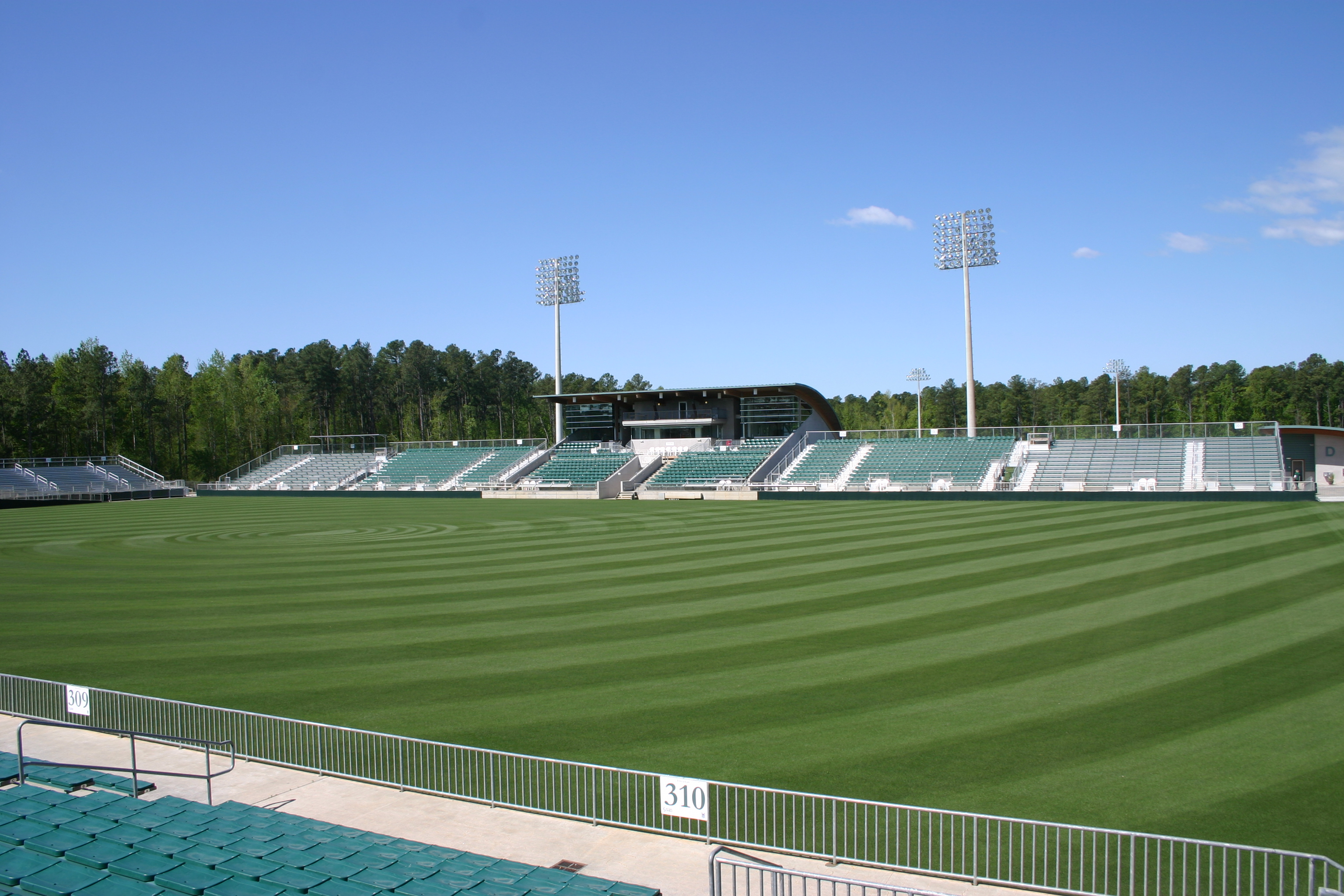
WakeMed Soccer Park

The North Carolina Courage play their home games at WakeMed Soccer Park, a soccer-specific stadium owned by Wake County and operated by the Town of Cary. Prior to 2026, the team shared the venue with North Carolina FC, a USL League One team also owned by Stephen Malik.

The soccer complex consists of a purpose-built main stadium, two lighted practice fields, and four additional fields. The main stadium and the two lighted fields (2 & 3) are all FIFA international regulation size (120 yards x 75 yards). The main stadium seats 10,000 with the expansions of 2012. Field 2 also has 1,000 permanent bleacher seats.

The park is on 150 acres (0.61 km^{2}) that the State of North Carolina has leased to Wake County. Money to build the soccer park came from $14.5 million in county-wide hotel room and prepared food and beverage taxes. The Town of Cary assumed responsibility for operations and maintenance in 2004 from Capital Area Soccer League. On January 26, 2006, the Town of Cary council amended its lease to allow it to sublet the property to Triangle Professional Soccer through the year 2011 for the exclusive promotion of professional soccer and lacrosse events at the complex. This deal was extended for the new ownership group through 2014.

=== Future stadium proposal ===
On December 6, 2016, along with a name change, North Carolina FC announced plans for a housing and multi-use stadium development — originally announced as seating 24,000, then scaled down to 20,000 seats — in Raleigh, North Carolina, as part of the men's team's bid for a Major League Soccer (MLS) expansion franchise. Team owner Stephen Malik and real-estate developer John Kane led investment in the proposal, purchasing 88 acres of land in 2019 and estimating the total project cost to be $1.9 billion. The MLS expansion bid was put on hold in 2021 along with the stadium plans as the COVID-19 pandemic consumed municipal funding. The project gained former BioAgylitix CEO Jim Datin as an investor in June 2022.

In December 2023, developers Kane Realty Corp. noted that the project was slowed due to interest rates, and that the first phase did not include a stadium. As of January 2025, there was still no timeline for groundbreaking.

== Records ==
=== Year-by-year ===
as of the 2024 NWSL season

Season	NWSL Regular Season							Position	NWSL Playoffs	NWSL Challenge Cup	Other	Top Scorer	
Season	P	W	L	D	GF	GA	Pts	Position	NWSL Playoffs	NWSL Challenge Cup	Other	Top Scorer	
2017	24	16	7	1	38	22	49	Shield	Runners-up			(United States) Lynn Williams	9
2018	24	17	1	6	53	17	57	Shield	Champions		ICC Champions	(United States) Lynn Williams	14
2019	24	15	5	4	54	23	49	Shield	Champions		ICC Runners-up	(United States) Lynn Williams	12
2020	4	1	2	1	8	10	5	5th	n/a	Quarterfinals		(Brazil) Debinha	7
2021	24	9	6	9	28	23	33	6th	First round	2nd, East Division		(United States) Lynn Williams	7
2022	22	9	8	5	46	33	32	7th	DNQ	Champions		(Brazil) Debinha	12
2023	22	9	7	6	29	22	33	3rd	First round	Champions		(Brazil) Kerolin	10
2024	26	12	11	3	34	28	39	5th	First Round	DNQ	Summer Cup Semi-finals	(United States) Ashley Sanchez	5
2025	26	9	8	9	37	39	35	9th	DNQ	DNQ		(Japan) Manaka Matsukubo	11

== Players ==
=== Current squad ===
As of October 8, 2026

No.	Pos.	Nation	Player
0	GK	USA	Madison White
1	GK	CAN	Kailen Sheridan
2	FW	USA	Ashley Sanchez
3	DF	USA	Sydney Schmidt
4	DF	USA	Natalie Jacobs
5	DF	USA	Cameron Brooks
6	DF	PUR	Ivy Younce
7	FW	ENG	Lauryn Thompson
8	FW	NGR	Chioma Okafor
10	FW	SWE	Evelyn Ijeh
11	DF	GER	Felicitas Rauch
12	DF	USA	Talia Staude
13	DF	USA	Ryan Williams
14	MF	CAN	Carly Wickenheiser
15	FW	USA	Payton Crawford
16	MF	USA	Riley Jackson
17	MF	USA	Dani Weatherholt
18	DF	JPN	Uno Shiragaki
19	MF	ENG	Erica Meg Parkinson
20	MF	JPN	Shinomi Koyama
21	FW	BRA	Bia
23	FW	USA	Gianna Paul
25	DF	USA	Maycee Bell
26	MF	NOR	Vilde Bøe Risa
33	FW	USA	Hannah Betfort
35	FW	USA	Ally Schlegel
36	DF	USA	Ella Hase
80	MF	USA	Oli Peña
99	GK	USA	Molly Pritchard

=== Staff ===
As of March 5, 2026.

Executive
Chairman	Stephen Malik
President	Francie Gottsegen
Chief soccer officer	Ceri Bowley
Assistant general manager	Bobby Hammond
Coaching
Head coach	Mak Lind
Assistant coach	Emma Thomson
Assistant coach	Jessica Silva
Assistant coach	David Maddren
Goalkeeping coach	Katelyn Rowland

=== Head coaching history ===
Name	Nationality	From	To
Paul Riley	England	January 9, 2017	September 30, 2021
Sean Nahas (interim)	United States	September 30, 2021	December 1, 2021
Sean Nahas	United States	December 1, 2021	August 6, 2025
Nathan Thackeray (acting)	England	August 6, 2025	December 31, 2025
Mak Lind	Lebanon	January 24, 2026	present

== Honors ==
- NWSL Championship
  - Winners (2): 2018, 2019
  - Runners-up (1): 2017
- NWSL Shield
  - Winners (3): 2017, 2018, 2019
- NWSL Challenge Cup
  - Winners (2): 2022, 2023
- Women's International Champions Cup
  - Winners (1): 2018
  - Runners-up (1): 2019

== Broadcasting ==
In 2024, select Courage games were broadcast locally on stations owned by Capitol Broadcasting Company. Dean Linke was the play-by-play announcer, with analysts including Heather O'Reilly, Jessica McDonald, and Kendall White.

In 2019, the NWSL broadcast partnership with A&E was terminated a year early, all games would be streamed on Yahoo! Sports in the United States and on the NWSL website for international viewers.

In 2018, Courage games continued to be streamed on Go90, the NWSL website and select games were broadcast on Lifetime. After Go90 was shut down by Verizon on July 30, all games were available for streaming on the NWSL website.

In 2017, Courage games were streamed exclusively by Go90 for American audiences and via the NWSL website for international viewers. As part of a three-year agreement with A&E Networks, Lifetime broadcasts one NWSL Game of the Week on Saturday afternoons. In 2017 season, the Courage were featured in national Lifetime NWSL Game of the Week broadcasts on June 3, July 1, August 19, and July 15, 2017.

== See also ==
- List of professional sports teams in the United States and Canada
- List of top-division football clubs in CONCACAF countries
- North Carolina FC
- North Carolina FC U23
- North Carolina Courage U23
- North Carolina FC Youth
