= Manaka Matsukubo =

Japanese footballer (born 2004)

Manaka Matsukubo 松窪 真心
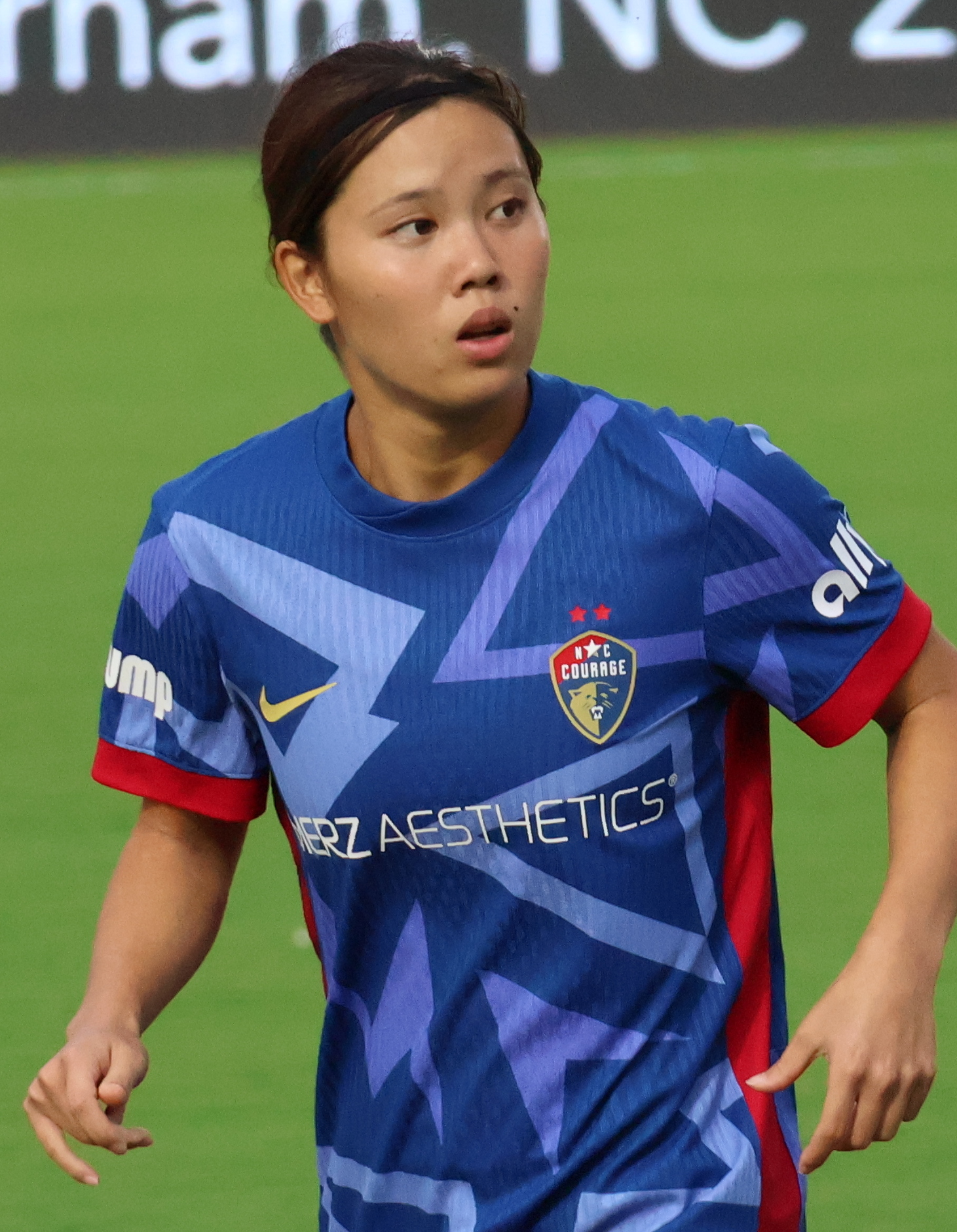
- Manaka with the North Carolina Courage in 2025

Personal information
- Full name: Manaka Matsukubo
- Date of birth: 28 July 2004 (age 22)
- Place of birth: Kagoshima, Kagoshima, Japan
- Height: 1.55 m (5 ft 1 in)
- Positions: Forward; attacking midfielder

Team information
- Current team: Chelsea
- Number: 29

Youth career
- 2017–2022: JFA Academy Fukushima

Senior career*
Years	Team	Apps	(Gls)
2019–2022	JFA Academy Fukushima	46	(30)
2023	Mynavi Sendai	12	(4)
2023–2024	→ North Carolina Courage (loan)	18	(2)
2024–2026	North Carolina Courage	40	(17)
2026–	Chelsea	3	(0)

International career^{‡}
2019	Japan U16		
2022–2024	Japan U20	16	(7)
2025–	Japan	18	(1)
Medal record
Women's football
Representing Japan
AFC Women's Asian Cup
Winner	2026 Australia
FIFA U-20 Women's World Cup
Runner-up	Colombia 2024
- * Club domestic league appearances and goals as of 22:00, 7 November 2026 (UTC) ‡ National team caps and goals as of 22:05, 7 November 2026 (UTC)

Manaka Matsukubo (松窪 真心, Matsukubo Manaka; born 28 July 2004) is a Japanese professional footballer who plays as a forward or attacking midfielder for Women's Super League club Chelsea and the Japan national team. She previously played in the National Women's Soccer League (NWSL) for the North Carolina Courage, winning NWSL Midfielder of the Year in 2025.

She represented Japan at two FIFA U-20 Women's World Cups, reaching the final both times and earning the Silver Ball in 2024.

== Club career ==
=== Mynavi Sendai ===
Manaka made her professional debut for Mynavi Sendai of the WE League on 5 March 2023 and played 1,075 minutes across the season. She helped the team to a fourth-place finish in her first year as a professional, scoring four goals and adding one assist.

=== North Carolina Courage ===
On 27 July 2023, the North Carolina Courage acquired Manaka on a year-long loan from Mynavi Sendai. She made her NWSL debut on 27 August 2023, starting in a 1–1 draw against the Chicago Red Stars. On 6 September, she started in the NWSL Challenge Cup semifinal against the Kansas City Current, becoming the youngest starter in the competition at 19 years old. Three days later, she started in the final against Racing Louisville and scored the second goal of the 2–0 victory. She was the youngest player to score in the competition and was named MVP of the title game. Following the game, Courage head coach Sean Nahas called her a "star in the making".

The following week, Manaka scored her first NWSL regular-season goal in a 2–1 loss to the Orlando Pride. On 15 October, she assisted Tyler Lussi's 1–0 winner against the Washington Spirit, clinching a playoff berth on the final day of the season. In the playoff quarterfinals, having lost NWSL MVP Kerolin to injury, the Courage fell 2–0 to the eventual champions Gotham FC.

On 27 June 2024, the Courage signed Manaka permanently on a year-and-a-half contract through 2025. On 7 July, she scored her first goal of the season when she chipped Racing Louisville goalkeeper Katie Lund from distance, earning a nomination for NWSL Goal of the Week. On 5 October, upon her return from the 2024 FIFA U-20 Women's World Cup, she set up a goal for Aline Gomes and scored the 2–1 game winner against the San Diego Wave, clinching a playoff berth and winning NWSL Goal of the Week for her header on a deflected cross from Ryan Williams. She finished her first complete NWSL season with 2 goals in 17 appearances. In the playoff quarterfinals, the Courage lost 1–0 to the Kansas City Current.

On 10 January 2025, the Courage announced that Manaka had signed a new two-year contract through 2026. On 17 May, she scored her first NWSL brace in a 2–0 win over the Chicago Stars, earning NWSL Player of the Week. On 21 June, she assisted Hannah Betfort's 2–1 winner against the Houston Dash, becoming the second-youngest NWSL player (after Trinity Rodman) to record goal contributions in five consecutive regular-season games (four goals and three assists).

On 17 October 2025, Manaka scored her first NWSL hat trick in a 4–1 win over Bay FC, becoming the youngest NWSL player to score a hat trick and being named NWSL Player of the Week for the second time. The following week, she scored a goal in the season finale against Gotham FC, but the Courage missed the playoffs despite a 3–2 win over the eventual champions. She finished an outstanding season with 11 goals (third in the NWSL) from 26 games. She was named NWSL Midfielder of the Year and NWSL Best XI First Team at the end of the season as well as one of five finalists for NWSL MVP.

On 28 March 2026, following the 2026 AFC Women's Asian Cup, Manaka made her season debut and scored in a 3–1 loss to Bay FC. By the summer break she was tied with back-to-back reigning NWSL MVP and golden boot recipient Temwa Chawinga, who had seven goals and two assists in eight matches, trailing only Barbra Banda for goal contributions in the league with five goals and four assists through nine appearances.

=== Chelsea ===
On 3 July 2026, Manaka joined Women's Super League club Chelsea on a five-year contract. She was initially unavailable for Chelsea due to injury; prior to making her senior debut for the club, she appeared twice for their Under-18 team, including in a 5–1 victory over Tottenham Hotspur's academy side where she scored a hat-trick. On 25 October 2026, Manaka made her club debut in a 1–3 victory over Crystal Palace, coming on as a substitute in the 90th minute.

== International career ==
=== Youth ===
Manaka played for Japan's under-20 side during the FIFA U-20 Women's World Cup in 2022, scoring one goal as Japan made it to the final.

She was called up to play at the 2024 AFC U-20 Women's Asian Cup, scoring 3 goals, but she left early to return to her club.

She was selected for her second FIFA U-20 Women's World Cup in 2024. In the semifinals, she scored both goals in a 2–0 victory over the Netherlands. She scored three goals in all at the tournament and received the Silver Ball as its second-best player.

=== Senior ===
Manaka received her first senior call-up to Japan in October 2024. She made her senior international debut on 20 February 2025, coming on as a substitute for Maika Hamano during a 4–0 win against Australia at the 2025 SheBelieves Cup. She scored her first international goal for the senior team on March 14, 2026 against the Philippines in the AFC Women's Asian Cup hosted by Australia.

== Career statistics ==
=== Club ===
As of match played 10 November 2026

Appearances and goals by club, season and competition
Club	Season	League			National Cup (Note: Includes Empress's Cup)		League Cup (Note: Includes Nadeshiko League Cup, NWSL Challenge Cup)		Continental (Note: Includes UEFA Women's Champions League)		Total	
Club	Season	Division	Apps	Goals	Apps	Goals	Apps	Goals	Apps	Goals	Apps	Goals
JFA Academy Fukushima	2019	Challenge League	10	3	1	0	0	0	—		11	3
JFA Academy Fukushima	2020	Challenge League	12	9	1	0	0	0	—		13	9
JFA Academy Fukushima	2021	Nadeshiko League 2	14	13	2	2	0	0	—		16	15
JFA Academy Fukushima	2022	Nadeshiko League 2	10	5	1	1	0	0	—		11	6
JFA Academy Fukushima	Total		46	30	5	3	0	0	0	0	51	33
Mynavi Sendai	2022–23	WE League	12	4	0	0	0	0	—		12	4
North Carolina Courage (loan)	2023	NWSL	7	1	—		2	1	—		9	2
North Carolina Courage	2024	NWSL	18	2	—		—		—		18	2
North Carolina Courage	2025	NWSL	26	11	—		—		—		26	11
North Carolina Courage	2026	NWSL	9	5	—		—		—		9	5
North Carolina Courage	Total		60	19	0	0	2	1	0	0	62	20
Chelsea	2026–27	WSL	3	0	0	0	—		1	0	4	0
Career Total			121	53	5	3	2	1	1	0	129	57

=== International ===
As of match played 9 June 2026

Appearances and goals by national team and year
National team	Year	Apps	Goals
Japan	2025	10	0
Japan	2026	8	1
Total		18	1

Scores and results list Japan's goal tally first, score column indicates score after each Matsukubo goal.

List of international goals scored by Manaka Matsukubo
No.	Date	Venue	Opponent	Score	Result	Competition
1	15 March 2026	Stadium Australia, Sydney, Australia	Philippines	4–0	7–0	2026 AFC Women's Asian Cup

== Honours and awards ==
JFA Academy Fukushima

- Nadeshiko Challenge League: 2020
- Nadeshiko League 2: 2021

North Carolina Courage

- NWSL Challenge Cup: 2023

Japan

- AFC Women's Asian Cup: 2026
- SheBelieves Cup: 2025

Individual

- NWSL Midfielder of the Year: 2025
- NWSL Best XI First Team: 2025
- NWSL Challenge Cup final MVP: 2023
- WE League Outstanding Player Award: 2022–23
