= 2018 North Carolina Courage season =

North Carolina Courage
2018 season
- Owner: Stephen Malik
- General manager: Curt Johnson
- Head coach: Paul Riley
- Stadium: Sahlen's Stadium at WakeMed Soccer Park; Cary, North Carolina (Capacity: 10,000)
- NWSL Regular Season: 1st
- NWSL Playoffs: Champions
- Women's ICC: Champions
- Top goalscorer: League: Lynn Williams (14); All: Lynn Williams (14)
- Highest home attendance: 9,505 (Sept. 8 vs. Houston)
- Lowest home attendance: 3,011 (Apr. 18 vs. Seattle)
- Average home league attendance: 5,129
- Biggest win: 5–0 (September 8 vs. Houston)
- Biggest defeat: 0–1 (June 16 vs. Utah)
| Home colors | Away colors |

The 2018 North Carolina Courage season was the team's second season as a professional women's soccer team. North Carolina Courage played in the National Women's Soccer League, the top tier of women's soccer in the United States. On August 5, the Courage clinched the 2018 NWSL Shield for the second consecutive season after a 2–1 win over Portland. The Courage finished the 2018 regular season with only 1 loss and broke the record for most wins in a season (17), most points (57) and most goals (53).

On September 22, North Carolina defeated the Portland Thorns 3-0 to win the 2018 NWSL Championship and completed one of the most successful seasons for a professional women's soccer team in the United States.

== Team ==
=== Coaching staff ===
As of May 31, 2018
Source: North Carolina Courage

| Position | Staff |
|---|---|
| Head coach | (England) Paul Riley |
| Assistant coach | (United States) Scott Vallow |
| Assistant coach | (United States) Bill Paladino |
| Assistant coach | (United States) Sean Nahas |
| Assistant coach | (England) Nathan Thackeray |

=== First-team roster ===
As of December 17, 2018
Source: North Carolina Courage

Note: Flags indicate national team as defined under FIFA eligibility rules; some limited exceptions apply. Players may hold more than one non-FIFA nationality.

| No. | Pos. | Nation | Player |
|---|---|---|---|
| 0 | GK | USA | Katelyn Rowland |
| 1 | GK | CAN | Sabrina D'Angelo |
| 4 | MF | USA | Elizabeth Eddy |
| 5 | MF | USA | Sam Mewis |
| 6 | DF | NZL | Abby Erceg |
| 7 | MF | USA | McCall Zerboni |
| 8 | MF | IRL | Denise O'Sullivan |
| 9 | FW | USA | Lynn Williams |
| 10 | MF | BRA | Debinha |
| 11 | DF | USA | Merritt Mathias |

| No. | Pos. | Nation | Player |
|---|---|---|---|
| 13 | DF | USA | Abby Dahlkemper |
| 14 | FW | USA | Jessica McDonald |
| 15 | DF | USA | Jaelene Hinkle |
| 16 | DF | USA | Cari Roccaro |
| 17 | MF | USA | Heather O'Reilly |
| 19 | FW | USA | Crystal Dunn |
| 22 | DF | USA | Julie King |
| 23 | FW | USA | Kristen Hamilton |
| 25 | DF | USA | Meredith Speck |
| 31 | DF | USA | Kaleigh Kurtz |

== Player transactions ==
=== 2018 NWSL College Draft ===
Source: National Women's Soccer League

| Round | Pick | Nat. | Player | Pos. | Previous Team |
|---|---|---|---|---|---|
| Round 1 | 10 | (United States) | Frannie Crouse | FW | Penn State |
| Round 2 | 20 | (United States) | Rebecca Rasmusen | MF | University of Colorado |
| Round 4 | 38 | (United States) | Morgan Reid | DF | Duke University |
| Round 4 | 39 | (United States) | Carlin Hudson | DF | Yale University |
| Round 4 | 40 | (United States) | Ryan Williams | DF | TCU |

=== In ===
| Date | Player | Positions played | Previous club | Fee/notes | Ref. |
|---|---|---|---|---|---|
| January 16, 2018 | (United States) Crystal Dunn | FW | (England) Chelsea F.C. | Rights were acquired in trade with the Washington Spirit. | |
| January 30, 2018 | (United States) Julie King | DF | (United States) Boston Breakers | Acquired during Boston Breakers Dispersal Draft | |
| January 30, 2018 | (Canada) Allysha Chapman | DF | (United States) Boston Breakers | Acquired during Boston Breakers Dispersal Draft | |
| January 31, 2018 | (United States) Merritt Mathias | DF | (United States) Seattle Reign | Acquired in a trade with the Seattle Reign in exchange for North Carolina's first round pick in the 2019 NWSL College Draft. The Courage also received Seattle's second round pick in 2019. | |
| June 28, 2018 | (United States) Heather O'Reilly | MF | (England) Arsenal | Signed after rights were acquired in trade with Utah Royals FC | |

=== Out ===
| Date | Player | Positions played | Destination club | Fee/notes | Ref. |
|---|---|---|---|---|---|
| October 23, 2017 | (United States) Stephanie Ochs | FW | | Placed on the Re-Entry Wire after the 2017 Season, wasn't claimed by another team. | |
| January 16, 2018 | (United States) Taylor Smith | DF | (United States) Washington Spirit | Traded to the Washington Spirit in exchange for the rights to Crystal Dunn. | |
| January 16, 2018 | (United States) Ashley Hatch | FW | (United States) Washington Spirit | Traded to the Washington Spirit in exchange for the rights to Crystal Dunn. | |
| May 9, 2018 | (Canada) Allysha Chapman | DF | (United States) Houston Dash | Traded to the Houston Dash in exchange for the Houston's first round draft pink in the 2019 NWSL College Draft | |
| June 28, 2018 | (United States) Makenzy Doniak | FW | (United States) Utah Royals FC | Traded to Utah Royals FC in exchange for the rights to Heather O'Reilly. | |

== Competitions ==
=== National Women's Soccer League ===
==== Preseason ====
Source: North Carolina Courage

| February 25 | North Carolina Courage | 2–0 | UNC–Chapel Hill | Cary, North Carolina |
| 11:00 a.m. ET | Jenkins | | | Stadium: WakeMed Soccer Park Field 6 |

| March 01 | NC State University | 0–4 | North Carolina Courage | Raleigh, North Carolina |
| 11:00 a.m. ET | | | McDonald; Jenkins; Hamilton; R. Williams | Stadium: Dail Soccer Stadium |

| March 04 | North Carolina Courage | 2–0 | University of Tennessee | Cary, North Carolina |
| 2:00 p.m. ET | Jenkins; Hamilton | | | Stadium: WakeMed Soccer Park |

| March 10 | North Carolina Courage | 3–0 | Clemson University | Cary, North Carolina |
| 3:30 p.m. ET | Williams; McDonald | | | Stadium: WakeMed Soccer Park Field 4 |

| March 17 | Washington Spirit | 0–3 | North Carolina Courage | Richmond, Virginia |
| 7:00 p.m. ET | | Report | Erceg 12'; McDonald 23' (Dunn); Hamilton 84'; Zerboni (yellow card) | Stadium: City Stadium (Richmond) |

==== Regular season ====
Source: North Carolina Courage

| March 24 1 | North Carolina Courage | 1–0 | Portland Thorns FC | Cary, North Carolina |
| 3:30 p.m. EST | Hinkle (yellow card) 51'; Debinha 70' | Report | Sonnett (yellow card) 33'; Horan (yellow card) 35' | Stadium: Sahlen's Stadium at WakeMed Soccer Park; Attendance: 4,210 |
Note: Televised on Lifetime.

| March 31 2 | North Carolina Courage | 1–0 | Sky Blue FC | Cary, North Carolina |
| 3:00 p.m. EST | McDonald 90+2' (Hinkle) | Report | Gibbons (yellow card) 66'; Stott (yellow card) 86' | Stadium: Sahlen's Stadium at WakeMed Soccer Park; Attendance: 4,078 |

| April 14 3 | Washington Spirit | 2–4 | North Carolina Courage | Boyds, Maryland |
| 7:00 p.m. EST | Pugh 3'; Ordega 58' (Solaun); Johnson (yellow card) 84' | Report | Dunn 20' (McDonald); Zerboni 24' (Williams), 48' (Hamilton); Williams 66' (Dunn) | Stadium: Maryland SoccerPlex; Attendance: 3,458; Referee: Jasmine Peralta |

| April 18 4 | North Carolina Courage | 1–0 | Seattle Reign FC | Cary, North Carolina |
| 7:00 p.m. EST | Hamilton (yellow card) 14'; McDonald 70' (Hamilton) | Report | | Stadium: Sahlen's Stadium at WakeMed Soccer Park; Attendance: 3,011; Referee: Kevin Broadley |

| April 21 5 | North Carolina Courage | 2–2 | Utah Royals FC | Cary, North Carolina |
| 3:30 p.m. EST | Mathias 6'; Hamilton (yellow card) 17'; Dunn 80'; Dahlkemper (yellow card) 87' | Report | Ratcliffe (yellow card) 28' (goal) 66'; Stengel 52' | Stadium: Sahlen's Stadium at WakeMed Soccer Park; Attendance: 3,958; Referee: Jon Fremon |
Note: Televised on Lifetime.

| April 28 6 | Houston Dash | 0–2 | North Carolina Courage | Houston, Texas |
| 2:30 p.m. CST | | Report | Dunn 3' (McDonald); Hamilton 48' (O'Sullivan); Mathias (yellow card) 44' | Stadium: BBVA Compass Stadium; Referee: Elvis Osmanovic |
Note: Televised on Lifetime.

| May 06 7 | North Carolina Courage | 1–1 | Chicago Red Stars | Cary, North Carolina |
| 3:00 p.m. EST | Mewis (yellow card) 45'; Zerboni (yellow card) 71' (goal) 82' | Report | Kerr 37'; Nagasato (yellow card) 45+3'; Vasconcelos (yellow card) 73' | Stadium: Sahlen's Stadium at WakeMed Soccer Park; Attendance: 4,068; Referee: Marco Vega |

| May 12 8 | North Carolina Courage | 1–0 | Washington Spirit | Cary, North Carolina |
| 7:00 p.m. EST | Erceg 63' (Hinkle) | Report | Ordega (yellow card) 38' | Stadium: Sahlen's Stadium at WakeMed Soccer Park; Attendance: 5,866; Referee: Jonathan Bilinksi |

| May 19 9 | Sky Blue FC | 1–2 | North Carolina Courage | Piscataway, New Jersey |
| 7:00 p.m. EST | Lloyd (yellow card) 15' (goal) 90+4' (Killion); Tiernan (yellow card) 85' | Report | Dunn 19' (McDonald); Mewis 27'; Rowland (yellow card) 70' | Stadium: Yurcak Field; Attendance: 1,923; Referee: Danielle Chesky |

| May 23 10 | Orlando Pride | 3–4 | North Carolina Courage | Orlando, Florida |
| 7:30 p.m. EST | Ubogagu 52' (Marta); Kennedy 65' (Nairn) van Egmond (yellow card) 72'; Hill 83' (Marta) | Report | McDonald 32' (O'Sullivan), 90' (Hinkle); Debinha 57'; Mewis 62' (Dunn); Erceg (yellow card) 90+3' | Stadium: Orlando City Stadium; Attendance: 3,104; Referee: Christina Unkel |

| May 30 11 | Portland Thorns FC | 1–4 | North Carolina Courage | Portland, Oregon |
| 7:30 p.m. PST | Sinclair (yellow card) 38'; Klingenberg (yellow card) 70'; Reynolds 89' | Report | Williams 31' (pen.) 62' (Mewis); Debinha 58' (Dunn); Mewis 64' (Zerboni); Mathias (yellow card) 79'; Hamilton (yellow card) 88' | Stadium: Providence Park; Attendance: 15,018; Referee: Joe Dickerson |

| June 03 12 | Houston Dash | 1–1 | North Carolina Courage | Houston, Texas |
| 6:00 p.m. CST | Ohai 49' (Campbell); Daly (yellow card) 68'; Kgatlana (yellow card) 90+3' | Report | Williams (yellow card) 45+1'; Crouse 80' | Stadium: BBVA Compass Stadium; Attendance: 2,941; Referee: Natalie Simon |

| June 16 13 | North Carolina Courage | 0–1 | Utah Royals FC | Cary, North Carolina |
| 7:00 p.m. EST | | Report | Scott (yellow card) 26'; Ratcliffe 90+4' | Stadium: Sahlen's Stadium at WakeMed Soccer Park; Attendance: 5,164; Referee: Jasmine Peralta |

| June 23 14 | Seattle Reign FC | 1–4 | North Carolina Courage | Seattle, Washington |
| 1:00 p.m. PST | Oyster 18' | Report | Williams 27' (Hinkle); Dunn 33' (Williams) 70' (Williams); Mathias 48' | Stadium: Memorial Stadium; Attendance: 4,032; Referee: Lukasz Szpala |

| June 30 15 | Orlando Pride | 0–3 | North Carolina Courage | Orlando, Florida |
| 3:30 p.m. EST | | Report | Debinha 37'; Mathias 39' (Debinha); McDonald 40' (Dunn) | Stadium: Orlando City Stadium; Attendance: 4,017; Referee: Elvis Osmanovic |
Note: Televised on Lifetime.

| July 04 16 | North Carolina Courage | 4–1 | Chicago Red Stars | Cary, North Carolina |
| 7:00 p.m. EST | Dunn 20' (McDonald); Williams 37' (Mathias); Debinha 69' (Mewis); Hamilton 87' (Williams) | Report | Ertz (yellow card) 32'; Nagasato 90+3' (pen.) | Stadium: Sahlen's Stadium at WakeMed Soccer Park; Attendance: 5,295; Referee: Matthew Franz |
Note: Match start delayed 1 hour, 50 minutes due to inclement weather

| July 11 17 | North Carolina Courage | 2–0 | Washington Spirit | Cary, North Carolina |
| 7:00 p.m. EST | Debinha 12'; O'Sullivan (yellow card) 53'; McDonald 60' (Dunn) | Report | | Stadium: Sahlen's Stadium at WakeMed Soccer Park; Attendance: 3,409; Referee: Daniel Gutierrez |

| July 14 18 | Sky Blue FC | 0–4 | North Carolina Courage | Piscataway, New Jersey |
| 7:00 p.m. EST | Lloyd (yellow card) 85' | Report | Erceg 15' (Hamilton); Williams 56' (Hamilton), 72' (Debinha), 89' | Stadium: Yurcak Field; Attendance: 2,376; Referee: Danielle Chesky |

| July 20 19 | Utah Royals FC | 0–0 | North Carolina Courage | Sandy, Utah |
| 8:00 p.m. MST | | Report | | Stadium: Rio Tinto Stadium; Attendance: 8,529; Referee: Christina Unkel |

| August 05 20 | North Carolina Courage | 2–1 | Portland Thorns FC | Cary, North Carolina |
| 6:00 p.m. EST | Williams 37' (McDonald), 45' | Report | Sonett (yellow card) 45+3'; Horan 49' (Heath); Foord (yellow card) 85' | Stadium: Sahlen's Stadium at WakeMed Soccer Park; Attendance: 5,379; Referee: Michael Radchuck |

| August 10 21 | Chicago Red Stars | 1–1 | North Carolina Courage | Bridgeview, Illinois |
| 7:00 p.m. CST | Kerr 64' (DiBernardo); Nagasato (yellow card) 72' | Report | Debinha 21' (McDonald); Hamilton (yellow card) 87' | Stadium: Toyota Park; Attendance: 3,567; Referee: Matthew Franz |

| August 18 22 | North Carolina Courage | 3–0 | Orlando Pride | Cary, North Carolina |
| 7:00 p.m. ET | Mathias (yellow card) 37'; Zadorsky 75' (o.g.); Debinha 81' (Williams); Williams 88' (Mathias) | Report | Van Egmond (yellow card) 28' | Stadium: Sahlen's Stadium at WakeMed Soccer Park; Attendance: 7,606; Referee: Kevin Broadley |
Note: Game resumed in the 22nd minute on Sunday, August 19 due to weather

| August 25 23 | Seattle Reign FC | 1–1 | North Carolina Courage | Seattle, Washington |
| 1:00 p.m. PST | Nielsen 67' (Fishlock); Taylor (yellow card) 79' | Report | McDonald (yellow card) 23'; O'Sullivan (yellow card) 45+3'; Mathias (yellow card) 85'; Williams 90+6' | Stadium: Memorial Stadium; Attendance: 4,455 |

| September 08 24 | North Carolina Courage | 5–0 | Houston Dash | Cary, North Carolina |
| 7:30 p.m. EST | McDonald 13' (Erceg); Dunn 26'; Williams 44' (McDonald), 57' (McDonald); Hamilton 70' | Report | | Stadium: Sahlen's Stadium at WakeMed Soccer Park; Attendance: 9,505 |

==== Postseason playoffs ====
| September 18 Semifinal | North Carolina Courage | 2–0 | Chicago Red Stars | Portland, Oregon |
| 6:00 p.m. PST | McDonald 5' (Dunn); Mathias (yellow card) 72'; Mewis 86' (Dunn) | Report | | Stadium: Providence Park; Attendance: 4,646; Referee: Timothy Ford |
Note: Televised on ESPNews. Due to the impending arrival of Hurricane Florence, the league rescheduled the Courage-Red Stars semifinal for September 18 in Portland.

| September 22 Final | North Carolina Courage | 3–0 | Portland Thorns FC | Portland, Oregon |
| 1:30 p.m. PST | Debinha 13'; McDonald 40' (Hinkle), 64' (Mathias) (yellow card) 65'; O'Sullivan (yellow card) 42' | Report | | Stadium: Providence Park; Attendance: 21,144; Referee: Guido Gonzalez; Assistant referees: Brooke Mayo, Adrienne McDonald; Fourth official: Karen Abt |
Note: Televised on Lifetime.

==== League table ====
| Pos | Team | Pld | W | D | L | GF | GA | GD | Pts | |
|---|---|---|---|---|---|---|---|---|---|---|
| 1 | North Carolina Courage (C) | 24 | 17 | 6 | 1 | 53 | 17 | +36 | 57 | NWSL Shield |
| 2 | Portland Thorns FC | 24 | 12 | 6 | 6 | 40 | 28 | +12 | 42 | NWSL Playoffs |
| 3 | Seattle Reign FC | 24 | 11 | 8 | 5 | 27 | 19 | +8 | 41 | NWSL Playoffs |
| 4 | Chicago Red Stars | 24 | 9 | 10 | 5 | 38 | 28 | +10 | 37 | NWSL Playoffs |
| 5 | Utah Royals FC | 24 | 9 | 8 | 7 | 22 | 23 | −1 | 35 | |
| 6 | Houston Dash | 24 | 9 | 5 | 10 | 35 | 39 | −4 | 32 | |
| 7 | Orlando Pride | 24 | 8 | 6 | 10 | 30 | 37 | −7 | 30 | |
| 8 | Washington Spirit | 24 | 2 | 5 | 17 | 12 | 35 | −23 | 11 | |
| 9 | Sky Blue FC | 24 | 1 | 6 | 17 | 21 | 52 | −31 | 9 | |

Source: NWSL
Rules for classification: Tiebreakers
(C) Champions

==== Results by round ====
| Round | 1 | 2 | 3 | 4 | 5 | 6 | 7 | 8 | 9 | 10 | 11 | 12 | 13 | 14 | 15 | 16 | 17 | 18 | 19 | 20 | 21 | 22 | 23 | 24 |
|---|---|---|---|---|---|---|---|---|---|---|---|---|---|---|---|---|---|---|---|---|---|---|---|---|
| Stadium | H | H | A | H | H | A | H | H | A | A | A | A | H | A | A | H | H | A | A | H | A | H | A | H |
| Result | W | W | W | W | D | W | D | W | W | W | W | D | L | W | W | W | W | W | D | W | D | W | D | W |
| Position | 2 | 1 | 1 | 1 | 1 | 1 | 1 | 1 | 1 | 1 | 1 | 1 | 1 | 1 | 1 | 1 | 1 | 1 | 1 | 1 | 1 | 1 | 1 | 1 |

Updated to match(es) played on September 8, 2018. Source: NWSLsoccer.com
A = Away; H = Home; W = Win; D = Draw; L = Loss

=== International friendlies ===
As defending 2017 Shield winners and playoff finalists, the Courage were selected to participate in the inaugural Women's International Champions Cup. They defeated French side Paris Saint-Germain Women in the semi-final round and French side and defending UEFA Women's Champions League titleholders Lyon Women in the final at Miami Garden's Hard Rock Stadium to become the first ever champions of the event.

| July 26 Semi-final | North Carolina Courage (United States) | 2–1 | (France) Paris-Saint Germain Women | Miami Gardens, Florida |
| 6:15 p.m. ET | McDonald 19' (Kurtz); Speck (yellow card) 56'; Jenkins 84' (Williams) | Report | Kurtz 40' (o.g.) | Stadium: Hard Rock Stadium; Referee: Natalie Simon |

| July 29 Final | North Carolina Courage (United States) | 1–0 | (France) Lyon Women | Miami Gardens, Florida |
| 9:00 p.m. ET | O'Reilly 10' (Williams); Roccaro (yellow card) 69' | Report | Buchanan (yellow card) 81' | Stadium: Hard Rock Stadium; Referee: Jasmine Peralta |
Note: Televised on ESPN2

== Statistics ==
=== Appearances ===
| No. | Pos | Nat | Player | NWSL Regular Season | | | | | NWSL Playoffs | | | | | Women's ICC | | | | |
| No. | Pos | Nat | Player | Apps | Goals | Booked | (yellow card) (yellow-red card) | Sent off (straight red) | Apps | Goals | Booked | (yellow card) (yellow-red card) | Sent off (straight red) | Apps | Goals | Booked | (yellow card) (yellow-red card) | Sent off (straight red) |
Goalkeepers
| 0 | GK | (United States) | Katelyn Rowland | 18 | 0 | 1 | 0 | 0 | 1 | 0 | 0 | 0 | 0 | 1 | 0 | 0 | 0 | 0 |
| 1 | GK | (Canada) | Sabrina D'Angelo | 6 | 0 | 0 | 0 | 0 | 1 | 0 | 0 | 0 | 0 | 1 | 0 | 0 | 0 | 0 |
Defenders
| 6 | DF | (New Zealand) | Abby Erceg | 24 | 2 | 1 | 0 | 0 | 2 | 0 | 0 | 0 | 0 | 2 | 0 | 0 | 0 | 0 |
| 11 | DF | (United States) | Merritt Mathias | 22 | 3 | 3 | 0 | 0 | 2 | 0 | 1 | 0 | 0 | 0 | 0 | 0 | 0 | 0 |
| 13 | DF | (United States) | Abby Dahlkemper | 19 | 0 | 1 | 0 | 0 | 2 | 0 | 0 | 0 | 0 | 0 | 0 | 0 | 0 | 0 |
| 15 | DF | (United States) | Jaelene Hinkle | 20 | 0 | 1 | 0 | 0 | 2 | 0 | 0 | 0 | 0 | 2 | 0 | 0 | 0 | 0 |
| 16 | DF | (United States) | Cari Roccaro | 2 | 0 | 0 | 0 | 0 | 0 | 0 | 0 | 0 | 0 | 2 | 0 | 1 | 0 | 0 |
| 20 | DF | (Japan) | Yuri Kawamura | 1+1 | 0 | 0 | 0 | 0 | 0 | 0 | 0 | 0 | 0 | 1+1 | 0 | 0 | 0 | 0 |
| 22 | DF | (United States) | Julie King | 0 | 0 | 0 | 0 | 0 | 0 | 0 | 0 | 0 | 0 | 0 | 0 | 0 | 0 | 0 |
| 25 | DF | (United States) | Meredith Speck | 2+12 | 0 | 0 | 0 | 0 | 0 | 0 | 0 | 0 | 0 | 2 | 0 | 1 | 0 | 0 |
| 27 | DF | (United States) | Morgan Reid | 0 | 0 | 0 | 0 | 0 | 0 | 0 | 0 | 0 | 0 | 0+2 | 0 | 0 | 0 | 0 |
| 29 | DF | (United States) | Ryan Williams | 0+1 | 0 | 0 | 0 | 0 | 0 | 0 | 0 | 0 | 0 | 1+1 | 0 | 0 | 0 | 0 |
| 31 | DF | (United States) | Kaleigh Kurtz | 6 | 0 | 0 | 0 | 0 | 0 | 0 | 0 | 0 | 0 | 2 | 0 | 0 | 0 | 0 |
Midfielders
| 4 | MF | (United States) | Elizabeth Eddy | 1+1 | 0 | 0 | 0 | 0 | 0 | 0 | 0 | 0 | 0 | 0 | 0 | 0 | 0 | 0 |
| 5 | MF | (United States) | Sam Mewis | 11+6 | 3 | 1 | 0 | 0 | 2 | 1 | 0 | 0 | 0 | 0 | 0 | 0 | 0 | 0 |
| 7 | MF | (United States) | McCall Zerboni | 20 | 3 | 1 | 0 | 0 | 0 | 0 | 0 | 0 | 0 | 0 | 0 | 0 | 0 | 0 |
| 8 | MF | (Republic of Ireland) | Denise O'Sullivan | 20+2 | 0 | 2 | 0 | 0 | 2 | 0 | 1 | 0 | 0 | 2 | 0 | 0 | 0 | 0 |
| 10 | MF | (Brazil) | Debinha | 20+1 | 8 | 0 | 0 | 0 | 2 | 1 | 0 | 0 | 0 | 0 | 0 | 0 | 0 | 0 |
| 17 | MF | (United States) | Heather O'Reilly | 2+6 | 0 | 0 | 0 | 0 | 0+2 | 0 | 0 | 0 | 0 | 2 | 1 | 0 | 0 | 0 |
| 30 | MF | (United States) | Sarah Teegarden | 0 | 0 | 0 | 0 | 0 | 0 | 0 | 0 | 0 | 0 | 0+1 | 0 | 0 | 0 | 0 |
Forwards
| 9 | FW | (United States) | Lynn Williams | 20+1 | 14 | 1 | 0 | 0 | 2 | 0 | 0 | 0 | 0 | 2 | 0 | 0 | 0 | 0 |
| 12 | FW | (United States) | Frannie Crouse | 0+1 | 1 | 0 | 0 | 0 | 0 | 0 | 0 | 0 | 0 | 0 | 0 | 0 | 0 | 0 |
| 14 | FW | (United States) | Jessica McDonald | 20+2 | 7 | 1 | 0 | 0 | 2 | 3 | 1 | 0 | 0 | 1+1 | 1 | 0 | 0 | 0 |
| 16 | FW | (United States) | Darian Jenkins | 0+12 | 0 | 0 | 0 | 0 | 0+1 | 0 | 0 | 0 | 0 | 0+2 | 1 | 0 | 0 | 0 |
| 19 | FW | (United States) | Crystal Dunn | 21+1 | 8 | 0 | 0 | 0 | 2 | 0 | 0 | 0 | 0 | 0 | 0 | 0 | 0 | 0 |
| 23 | FW | (United States) | Kristen Hamilton | 8+15 | 3 | 3 | 0 | 0 | 0+2 | 0 | 0 | 0 | 0 | 2 | 0 | 0 | 0 | 0 |
| Totals | | | | | 52 | 16 | 0 | 0 | | 5 | 3 | 0 | 0 | | 3 | 2 | 0 | 0 |

Last updated: September 22, 2018.
Source: Competitive matches

=== Goalscorers ===
| Rank | No. | Pos | Nat | Name | NWSL Regular Season | NWSL Playoffs | Women's ICC | Total |
|---|---|---|---|---|---|---|---|---|
| 1 | 9 | FW | (United States) | Lynn Williams | 14 | 0 | 0 | 14 |
| 2 | 14 | FW | (United States) | Jessica McDonald | 7 | 3 | 1 | 11 |
| 3 | 10 | FW | (Brazil) | Debinha | 9 | 0 | 0 | 9 |
| 4 | 19 | FW | (United States) | Crystal Dunn | 8 | 0 | 0 | 8 |
| 5 | 5 | MF | (United States) | Samantha Mewis | 3 | 1 | 0 | 4 |
| 6 | 7 | MF | (United States) | McCall Zerboni | 3 | 0 | 0 | 3 |
| 6 | 11 | DF | (United States) | Merritt Mathias | 3 | 0 | 0 | 3 |
| 6 | 23 | FW | (United States) | Kristen Hamilton | 3 | 0 | 0 | 3 |
| 9 | 6 | DF | (New Zealand) | Abby Erceg | 2 | 0 | 0 | 2 |
| 10 | 12 | FW | (United States) | Frannie Crouse | 1 | 0 | 0 | 1 |
| 10 | 17 | MF | (United States) | Heather O'Reilly | 0 | 0 | 1 | 1 |
| 10 | 21 | FW | (United States) | Darian Jenkins | 0 | 0 | 1 | 1 |
| Totals | | | | | 52 | 2 | 3 | 58 |

Last updated: September 22, 2018.
Source: Competitive matches

== Honors and awards ==
=== NWSL Season Awards ===
- Most Valuable Player: Lynn Williams (finalist), McCall Zerboni (finalist)
- Defender of the Year: Abby Dahlkemper (finalist), Abby Erceg (finalist)
- Coach of the Year: Paul Riley (finalist)
- Best XI: Abby Dahlkemper, Abby Erceg, McCall Zerboni, Crystal Dunn
- Second XI: Merritt Mathias, Debinha, Lynn Williams

=== NWSL Championship Game Awards ===
- Most Valuable Player: Jessica McDonald

=== NWSL Team of the Month ===
| Month | Goalkeeper | Defenders | Midfielders | Forwards | Ref. |
|---|---|---|---|---|---|
| March | | (United States) Jaelene Hinkle | (Brazil) Debinha | (United States) Crystal Dunn | |
| April | | (United States) Jaelene Hinkle | (United States) Crystal Dunn (United States) McCall Zerboni | (United States) Jessica McDonald | |
| May | | (New Zealand) Abby Erceg | (United States) McCall Zerboni | (United States) Crystal Dunn | |
| June | | (New Zealand) Abby Erceg (United States) Merritt Mathias | (United States) McCall Zerboni | (United States) Crystal Dunn | |
| July | | (New Zealand) Abby Erceg | (United States) McCall Zerboni | | |
| August | | (New Zealand) Abby Erceg | | (United States) Lynn Williams | |

=== NWSL Player of the Month ===
| Month | Result | Player | Ref. |
|---|---|---|---|
| June | Won | (United States) Crystal Dunn | |

=== NWSL Player of the Week ===
| Week | Result | Player | Ref |
|---|---|---|---|
| 3 | Won | (United States) McCall Zerboni | |
| 5 | Won | (United States) McCall Zerboni | |
| 8 | Won | (United States) Crystal Dunn | |
| 13 | Won | (United States) Crystal Dunn | |
| 16 | Won | (United States) Lynn Williams | |
| 19 | Won | (United States) Lynn Williams | |

=== NWSL Goal of the Week ===
| Week | Result | Player | Ref. |
|---|---|---|---|
| 1 | Nominated | (Brazil) Debinha | |
| 2 | Nominated | (United States) Jessica McDonald | |
| 3 | Nominated | (United States) McCall Zerboni | |
| 4 | Won | (United States) Merritt Mathias | |
| 5 | Nominated | (United States) Kristen Hamilton | |
| 8 | Nominated | (United States) Crystal Dunn | |
| 9 | Nominated | (United States) Jessica McDonald | |
| 10 | Nominated | (United States) Frannie Crouse | |
| 13 | Nominated | (United States) Merritt Mathias | |
| 14 | Nominated | (United States) Jessica McDonald | |
| 15 | Nominated | (United States) Lynn Williams | |
| 19 | Nominated | (United States) Lynn Williams | |
| 24 | Nominated | (United States) Jessica McDonald | |

=== NWSL Save of the Week ===
| Week | Result | Player | Ref. |
|---|---|---|---|
| 5 | Nominated | (Canada) Sabrina D'Angelo | |
| 6 | Nominated | (Canada) Sabrina D'Angelo | |
| 7 | Nominated | (United States) Katelyn Rowland | |
| 8 | Nominated | (United States) Katelyn Rowland | |
| 14 | Nominated | (United States) Katelyn Rowland | |
| 15 | Nominated | (Republic of Ireland) Denise O'Sullivan | |
| 16 | Nominated | (United States) Katelyn Rowland | |

== See also ==
- 2018 National Women's Soccer League season
- 2018 in American soccer
