= 2019–20 Manchester City W.F.C. season =

Manchester City Women
2019–20 season
- Chairman: Khaldoon Mubarak
- Manager: Nick Cushing (until 2 February); Alan Mahon (interim, from 3 February)
- Stadium: Academy Stadium
- Women's Super League: 2nd
- Women's FA Cup: Winners
- League Cup: Semi-finals
- Champions League: Round of 16
- Highest home attendance: 31,213 (vs. Manchester United, 7 September)
- Lowest home attendance: 1,173 (vs. Brighton & Hove Albion, 15 December)
- Average home league attendance: 5,885 as of 12 February 2020
Home colours	Away colours	Third colours

The 2019–20 season was Manchester City Women's Football Club's 32nd season of competitive football and its seventh season in the FA Women's Super League and at the top level of English women's football.

On 13 March 2020, in line with the FA's response to the coronavirus pandemic, it was announced the season was temporarily suspended until at least 3 April 2020. After further postponements, the season was ultimately ended prematurely on 25 May 2020 with immediate effect. Manchester City sat in 1st place at the time, one point ahead of Chelsea having played a game more, but dropped down to 2nd place on sporting merit after The FA Board's decision to award places on a points-per-game basis and award Chelsea the title.

== Non-competitive ==
=== Pre-season ===
2019 Women's International Champions Cup

15 August 2019 Semi-finals	North Carolina Courage (United States)	2–1	(England) Manchester City	Cary, United States
19:30 EDT (UTC−04:00)	Meehan 84'; McDonald 90+3'	Report	Stanway 41'	Stadium: WakeMed Soccer Park; Referee: Jamie Willis

18 August 2019 Third-placed playoff	Manchester City (England)	3–2	(Spain) Atlético Madrid	Cary, United States
EDT (UTC−04:00)	Hemp 22'; Beckie 83'; Wullaert 90+3'		Torrecilla 58'; Sosa 63'	Stadium: WakeMed Soccer Park

== Competitions ==
=== Women's Super League ===
==== League table ====
Pos	Team	Pld	W	D	L	GF	GA	GD	Pts	PPG	Qualification
1	Chelsea (C)	15	12	3	0	47	11	+36	39	2.60	Qualification for the Champions League knockout phase
2	Manchester City	16	13	1	2	39	9	+30	40	2.50	Qualification for the Champions League knockout phase
3	Arsenal	15	12	0	3	40	13	+27	36	2.40	
4	Manchester United	14	7	2	5	24	12	+12	23	1.64	
5	Reading	14	6	3	5	21	24	−3	21	1.50	

Source: FA WSL, BBC
Rules for classification: Initially: 1) Points; 2) Goal difference; 3) Number of goals scored. After abandonment of season: 1) Points per game
(C) Champions

==== Results summary ====
Overall								Home						Away					
Pld	W	D	L	GF	GA	GD	Pts	W	D	L	GF	GA	GD	W	D	L	GF	GA	GD
16	13	1	2	39	9	+30	40	8	1	0	24	5	+19	5	0	2	15	4	+11

Last updated: 24 July 2020.
Source: FA WSL

==== Results by matchday ====
Matchday	1	2	3	4	5	6	7	8	9	10	11	12	13	14	15	16	17	18	19	20	21	22
Ground	H	A	A	H	A	H	A	H	A	H	A	H	A	H	H	H	A	A	H	A	H	A
Result	W	W	W	W	L	W	W	W	L	W	W	W	W	W	W	D	C	C	C	C	C	C
Position	4	2	2	1	3	2	2	2	3	2	2	2	1	1	1	1						

Updated to match(es) played on 24 July 2020. Source: FA WSL
W = Win; D = Draw; L = Loss

==== Matches ====
7 September 2019 1	Manchester City	1–0	Manchester United	Manchester
15:00 BST (UTC+01:00)	Weir 48'	Report		Stadium: City of Manchester Stadium; Attendance: 31,213; Referee: Rebecca Welch

15 September 2019 2	Reading	0–2	Manchester City	High Wycombe
12:30 BST (UTC+01:00)		Report	Bremer 30', 59'	Stadium: Adams Park; Attendance: 897; Referee: Stacey Pearson

29 September 2019 3	Everton	0–1	Manchester City	Southport
12:30 BST (UTC+01:00)		Report	Houghton 7'; Wullaert (yellow card) 12'; Mannion (yellow card) 45'; Scott (yellow card) 58'; Beckie (yellow card) 78'	Stadium: Haig Avenue; Attendance: 378; Referee: Lewis Smith

12 October 2019 4	Manchester City	3–0	Birmingham City	Manchester
14:00 BST (UTC+01:00)	Walsh 27'; Wullaert 48'; Bonner (yellow card) 74'; Lee 80'	Report		Stadium: Academy Stadium; Attendance: 1,834; Referee: Helen Conley

27 October 2019 5	Arsenal	1–0	Manchester City	Borehamwood
14:00 GMT (UTC+00:00)	Miedema 43'; McCabe (yellow card) 74'	Report	Bonner (yellow card) 80'	Stadium: Meadow Park; Attendance: 2,424; Referee: Rebecca Walsh

17 November 2019 6	Manchester City	5–0	West Ham United	Manchester
14:00 GMT (UTC+00:00)	White 11'; Stanway 31', 37', (yellow card) 63' (yellow-red card) 72'; Hemp 39'; Wullaert 53'	Report	Dali (yellow card) 27'	Stadium: Academy Stadium; Attendance: 2,145; Referee: Stacey Pearson

24 November 2019 7	Bristol City	0–5	Manchester City	Filton
15:00 GMT (UTC+00:00)		Report	Wullaert 21'; White 65'; Bremer 84', 90+2'; Weir 87'	Stadium: Stoke Gifford Stadium; Attendance: 1,212; Referee: Lucy Oliver

1 December 2019 8	Manchester City	1–0	Liverpool	Manchester
14:00 GMT (UTC+00:00)	Bonner 20'	Report		Stadium: Academy Stadium; Attendance: 2,293; Referee: Kirsty Dowle

8 December 2019 9	Chelsea	2–1	Manchester City	Kingston upon Thames
14:00 GMT (UTC+00:00)	England 79'; Mjelde 81'; Ingle (yellow card) 90+3'	Report	Weir (yellow card) 33', (goal) 59'; Hemp (yellow card) 45+1'	Stadium: Kingsmeadow; Attendance: 3,498; Referee: Amy Fearn

15 December 2019 10	Manchester City	5–0	Brighton & Hove Albion	Manchester
14:00 GMT (UTC+00:00)	Houghton 3'; White 14'; Hemp 38'; Stanway 79'; Bremer 86'	Report	Whelan (yellow card) 43'	Stadium: Academy Stadium; Attendance: 1,173; Referee: Lucy Oliver

5 January 2020 11	Tottenham Hotspur	1–4	Manchester City	Canons Park
14:00 GMT (UTC+00:00)	Dean 20' (pen.); Green (yellow card) 33'	Report	Bremer 2', 27'; White 5'; Hemp 44'; Bonner (yellow card) 69'	Stadium: The Hive Stadium; Attendance: 1,056; Referee: Helen Conley

11 January 2020 12	Manchester City	3–1	Everton	Manchester
17:30 GMT (UTC+00:00)	Bremer 18', 53'; Hemp (yellow card) 54'; Bonner 64'	Report	Kaagman (yellow card) 38'; Stringer (yellow card) 64'; Stanway 90' (o.g.)	Stadium: Academy Stadium; Attendance: 1,681; Referee: Amy Fearn

19 January 2020 13	Birmingham City	0–2	Manchester City	Solihull
14:00 GMT (UTC+00:00)		Report	White 1'; Walsh 65'	Stadium: Damson Park; Attendance: 1,197; Referee: Helen Conley

2 February 2020 14	Manchester City	2–1	Arsenal	Manchester
14:00 GMT (UTC+00:00)	Bremer 43'; Hemp 49'; Stanway (yellow card) 62'	Report	van de Donk 58', (yellow card) 60'; Mead (yellow card) 77'; Roord (yellow card) 81'; McCabe (yellow card) 84'	Stadium: Academy Stadium; Attendance: 3,664; Referee: Stacey Pearson

9 February 2020 15	West Ham United	P–P	Manchester City	Romford
15:00 GMT (UTC+00:00)				Stadium: Rush Green Training Ground
Note: All WSL games postponed due to adverse weather conditions

12 February 2020 16	Manchester City	1–0	Bristol City	Manchester
19:00 GMT (UTC+00:00)	Bonner 2'; Wullaert (yellow card) 80'	Report		Stadium: Academy Stadium; Attendance: 858; Referee: Lucy Oliver

23 February 2020 17	Manchester City	3–3	Chelsea	Manchester
14:00 GMT (UTC+00:00)	White 22'; Stanway 60'; Weir (yellow card) 71'; Hemp 76'	Report	Ji 39'; Eriksson 68'; England 74'	Stadium: Academy Stadium; Attendance: 3,542; Referee: Rebecca Welch

22 March 2020 18	Liverpool	Cancelled	Manchester City	Birkenhead
14:00 GMT (UTC+00:00)				Stadium: Prenton Park
Note: Cancelled due to coronavirus pandemic

28 March 2020 19	Manchester United	Cancelled	Manchester City	Leigh
15:00 GMT (UTC+00:00)				Stadium: Leigh Sports Village
Note: Cancelled due to coronavirus pandemic

5 April 2020 20	Manchester City	Cancelled	Reading	Manchester
14:00 BST (UTC+01:00)				Stadium: Academy Stadium
Note: Cancelled due to coronavirus pandemic

22 April 2020 15	West Ham United	Cancelled	Manchester City	Romford
19:30 BST (UTC+01:00)				Stadium: Rush Green Training Ground
Note: Rescheduled from 9 February 2020. Cancelled due to coronavirus pandemic

26 April 2020 21	Manchester City	Cancelled	Tottenham Hotspur	Manchester
14:00 BST (UTC+01:00)				Stadium: Academy Stadium
Note: Cancelled due to coronavirus pandemic

16 May 2020 22	Brighton & Hove Albion	Cancelled	Manchester City	Crawley
				Stadium: Broadfield Stadium
Note: Cancelled due to coronavirus pandemic

=== FA Cup ===
25 January 2020 Fourth round	Manchester United	2–3	Manchester City	Leigh
	James 69'; Hemp 88' (o.g.)	Report	White 30', 56'; Scott 76'	Stadium: Leigh Sports Village; Attendance: 1,948

16 February 2020 Fifth round	Manchester City	10–0	Ipswich Town	Manchester
14:00 GMT (UTC+00:00)	Coombs 19'; Bremer 25', 50', 64'; Park 30', 78', 80'; Stanway 57', 65', 86'	Report		Stadium: Academy Stadium; Attendance: 1,314

15 March 2020 Quarter-final	Leicester City	Postponed	Manchester City	Quorn
14:00 GMT (UTC+00:00)				Stadium: Farley Way Stadium

27 September 2020 Quarter-final	Leicester City	1–2	Manchester City	Quorn
14:00 GMT (UTC+00:00)	Devlin 78' (pen.)	Report	Kelly 36' (pen.); Stanway 41'	Stadium: Farley Way Stadium; Attendance: Behind-closed-doors; Referee: Robert Massey-Ellis

1 October 2020 Semi-finals	Manchester City	2–1	Arsenal	Manchester
19:15	Houghton 19'; Mewis 41'	Report	Nobbs 38'	Stadium: Academy Stadium; Attendance: Behind-closed-doors; Referee: Helen Conley

1 November 2020 Final	Everton	1–3 (a.e.t.)	Manchester City	London
14:30	Gauvin 60'	Report	Mewis 40'; Stanway 111'; Beckie 120+2'	Stadium: Wembley Stadium; Attendance: 0 Referee: Rebecca Welch (Durham)

=== League Cup ===
==== Group stage ====
Pos	Team	Pld	W	WPEN	LPEN	L	GF	GA	GD	Pts	Qualification
1	Manchester United	4	4	0	0	0	19	2	+17	12	Advance to knock-out stage
2	Manchester City	4	3	0	0	1	11	4	+7	9	Advance to knock-out stage
3	Birmingham City	4	2	0	0	2	8	6	+2	6	
4	Everton	4	1	0	0	3	5	8	−3	3	
5	Leicester City	4	0	0	0	4	2	25	−23	0	

Updated to match(es) played on 11 December 2019. Source: thefa.com
Rules for classification: 1) Points; 2) Goal difference; 3) Number of goals scored; 4) Number of wins; 5) Head-to-head record

22 September 2019 Group C	Manchester City	5–0	Leicester City	Manchester
14:00 BST (UTC+01:00)	Weir 28', 75'; Bremer 57', 65'; Wullaert 81'	Report	Blanchard (yellow card) 62'	Stadium: Academy Stadium; Attendance: 1,403; Referee: Thomas Kirk

20 October 2019 Group C	Manchester United	2–0	Manchester City	Leigh
12:00 BST (UTC+01:00)	Zelem 7'; Sigsworth 54'; Toone (yellow card) 85'	Report	Walsh (red card) 64'	Stadium: Leigh Sports Village; Attendance: 4,042; Referee: Amy Fearn

3 November 2019 Group C	Manchester City	2–1	Birmingham City	Manchester
14:00 GMT (UTC+00:00)	White 50'; Weir 68'	Report	Williams 64'	Stadium: Academy Stadium; Attendance: 1,178; Referee: Elizabeth Simms

21 November 2019 Group C	Everton	1–4	Manchester City	Crosby
19:30 GMT (UTC+00:00)	Pike 48'	Report	Wullaert 50'; Bonner 37' 65'; Hemp 86'	Stadium: Rossett Park; Attendance: 327; Referee: Philip Jones

==== Knockout phase ====
15 January 2020 Quarter-final	Sheffield United	0–4	Manchester City	Chesterfield
19:30		Report	Bremer 38', 44', 90+3'; Coombs 73'	Stadium: Proact Stadium; Attendance: 1,521; Referee: Jane Simms

29 January 2020 Semi-final	Arsenal	2–1	Manchester City	Borehamwood
19:30	Miedema 6'; van de Donk 44', (yellow card) 89'	Report	Stanway (yellow card) 14'; Bonner 60', (yellow card) 82'	Stadium: Meadow Park; Referee: Abigail Byrne

=== Champions League ===
==== Round of 32 ====
12 September 2019 First leg	FF Lugano 1976 (Switzerland)	1–7	(England) Manchester City	Lugano, Switzerland
21:00 CEST (UTC+02:00)	Dickerman 41'	Report	Stanway 26'; Mannion 48' (pen.); Bremer 65', 77'; Weir 83', 90+3'; Beckie 85'	Stadium: Cornaredo Stadium; Referee: Ewa Augustyn (Poland)

25 September 2019 Second leg	Manchester City (England)	4–0	(Switzerland) FF Lugano 1976	Manchester
19:00 BST (UTC+01:00)	Beckie 5', 33', 49'; Bremer 78'	Report		Stadium: Academy Stadium; Referee: Tanja Subotic (Slovenia)

==== Round of 16 ====
16 October 2019 First leg	Manchester City (England)	1–1	(Spain) Atlético Madrid	Manchester
20:00 (19:00 BST)	Bonner (yellow card) 5'; Beckie 13'; Weir (yellow card) 90+4'	Report	Ludmila (yellow card) 66'; Corral 81'	Stadium: Academy Stadium; Referee: Ivana Martinčić (Croatia)

30 October 2019 Second leg	Atlético Madrid (Spain)	2–1	(England) Manchester City	Alcalá de Henares, Spain
19:30	Houghton 40' (o.g.); Ludmila (yellow card) 66'; Sosa 68'	Report	Stanway (yellow card) 15'; Campbell (yellow card) 61'; Walsh (yellow card) 79'; Bremer 88'	Stadium: Centro Deportivo Wanda; Referee: Stéphanie Frappart (France)

== Squad information ==
=== Playing statistics ===
As of 23 February 2020

Appearances (Apps.) numbers are for appearances in competitive games only including sub appearances
Red card numbers denote: Numbers in parentheses represent red cards overturned for wrongful dismissal.

No.	Nat.	Player	Pos.	WSL			FA Cup			League Cup			Champions League			Total		
No.	Nat.	Player	Pos.	Apps	Goal	Sent off (straight red)	Apps	Goal	Sent off (straight red)	Apps	Goal	Sent off (straight red)	Apps	Goal	Sent off (straight red)	Apps	Goal	Sent off (straight red)
1	(England)	Karen Bardsley	GK															
2	(England)	Aoife Mannion	DF	4									3	1		7	1	
3	(England)	Demi Stokes	DF	14			2			5			4			25		
4	(England)	Gemma Bonner	DF	16	3		1			6	2		3			26	5	
5	(Republic of Ireland)	Megan Campbell	DF	7						4			3			14		
6	(England)	Steph Houghton	DF	16	2		2			6			4			28	2	
7	(England)	Laura Coombs	MF	4			2	1		4	1		1			11	2	
8	(England)	Jill Scott	MF	16			1	1		4			3			24	1	
9	(Germany)	Pauline Bremer	FW	12	10		1	3		5	5		3	4		21	22	
10	(England)	Georgia Stanway	FW	13	4	1	2	3		3			2	1		20	8	1
11	(Canada)	Janine Beckie	FW	14			1			5	1		4	5		24	6	
12	(Republic of Ireland)	Tyler Toland	MF	1			1			1			1			4		
13	(England)	Emma Bradley	GK															
15	(England)	Lauren Hemp	FW	14	5		2			5	1		2			23	6	
16	(England)	Jess Park	MF	2			1	3		3			1			8	3	
17	(South Korea)	Lee Geum-min	FW	3	1					1			3			7	1	
18	(England)	Ellen White	FW	12	6		1	2		4	1		1			18	9	
19	(Scotland)	Caroline Weir	FW	16	3		1			6	3		3	2		26	8	
24	(England)	Keira Walsh	MF	14	2		2			5		1	4			25	2	1
25	(Belgium)	Tessa Wullaert	FW	13	3		2			3	2		3			21	5	
26	(England)	Ellie Roebuck	GK	16			1			5			4			26		
28	(England)	Emma Bissell	FW				1			1						2		
34	(France)	Karima Benameur	GK	1			1			1						3		
35	(Portugal)	Matilde Fidalgo	DF	2			1			1			1			5		
Own goals					0			0			0			0			0	
Totals					39	1		13	0		16	1		13	0		81	2

== Transfers and loans ==
=== Transfers in ===
Date	Position	No.	Player	From club
1 July 2019	FW	18	(England) Ellen White	(England) Birmingham City
1 July 2019	DF	35	(Portugal) Matilde Fidalgo	(Portugal) S.C. Braga
1 July 2019	MF	7	(England) Laura Coombs	(England) Liverpool
9 July 2019	DF	2	(England) Aoife Mannion	(England) Birmingham City
7 August 2019	FW	17	(South Korea) Lee Geum-min	(South Korea) Gyeongju KHNP
9 August 2019	MF	12	(Republic of Ireland) Tyler Toland	(Northern Ireland) Sion Swifts
4 September 2019	GK	34	(France) Karima Benameur	(France) Paris FC

=== Transfers out ===
Date	Position	No.	Player	To club
30 May 2019	FW	22	(Scotland) Claire Emslie	(United States) Orlando Pride
30 June 2019	FW	17	(England) Nikita Parris	(France) Olympique Lyon
30 June 2019	DF	23	(England) Abbie McManus	(England) Manchester United
30 June 2019	FW	7	(England) Melissa Lawley	(England) Liverpool
30 June 2019	DF	5	(Scotland) Jen Beattie	(England) Arsenal
16 August 2019	GK	13	(England) Fran Stenson	(England) Arsenal

=== Loans out ===
Start date	End date	Position	No.	Player	To club
16 August 2019	30 June 2020	DF	14	(England) Esme Morgan	(England) Everton
