= 2022–23 Chelsea F.C. Women season =

Chelsea
2022–23 season
- Chairman: Adrian Jacob
- Manager: Emma Hayes
- Stadium: Kingsmeadow
- FA WSL: 1st
- FA Cup: Winners
- League Cup: Runners-up
- Champions League: Semi-finals
- Top goalscorer: League: Sam Kerr (12); All: Sam Kerr (30)
- Highest home attendance: 38,350 (vs. Tottenham Hotspur, 20 November 2022, WSL)
- Lowest home attendance: 916 (vs. Brighton & Hove Albion, 8 March 2023, WSL)
- Average home league attendance: 5,804
- Biggest win: 8–0 (vs. Vllaznia (H), 26 October 2022, Champions League); 8–0 (vs. Leicester City (A), 3 December 2022, WSL)
- Biggest defeat: 1–3 (vs. Arsenal (N), 5 March 2023, League Cup); 0–2 (vs. Manchester City (A), 26 March 2023, WSL)
| Home colours | Away colours | Third colours |

The 2022–23 season was Chelsea Women's 31st competitive season and 13th consecutive season in the FA Women's Super League, the top flight of English women's football. Chelsea competed in the domestic league as three-time defending champions since the 2019–20 season, and successfully managed to retain the title for the fourth time in a row, in addition to achieving a third consecutive double by also retaining the FA Cup once more.

== Squad information ==
=== First team squad ===
As of 4 January 2023

| No. | Name | Nat | Since | Date of birth (age) | Signed from |
Goalkeepers
| 1 | Zećira Mušović | (Sweden) | 2021 | 26 May 1996 (age 30) | (Sweden) Rosengård |
| 30 | Ann-Katrin Berger | (Germany) | 2019 | 9 October 1990 (age 35) | (England) Birmingham City |
| 32 | Emily Orman | (England) | 2019 | 5 November 2002 (age 23) | Homegrown |
Defenders
| 3 | Aniek Nouwen | (Netherlands) | 2021 | 9 March 1999 (age 27) | (Netherlands) PSV |
| 4 | Millie Bright | (England) | 2014 | 21 August 1993 (age 32) | (England) Doncaster Rovers Belles |
| 7 | Jessica Carter | (England) | 2018 | 27 October 1997 (age 28) | (England) Birmingham City |
| 15 | Ève Périsset | (France) | 2022 | 24 December 1994 (age 31) | (France) Bordeaux |
| 16 | Magdalena Eriksson (captain) | (Sweden) | 2017 | 8 September 1993 (age 32) | (Sweden) Linköping |
| 18 | Maren Mjelde | (Norway) | 2016 | 6 November 1989 (age 36) | (Norway) Avaldsnes IL |
| 21 | Niamh Charles | (England) | 2020 | 21 June 1999 (age 27) | (England) Liverpool |
| 26 | Kadeisha Buchanan | (Canada) | 2022 | 5 November 1995 (age 30) | (France) Lyon |
| 27 | Alsu Abdullina | (Russia) | 2021 | 11 April 2001 (age 25) | (Russia) Lokomotiv Moscow |
| 29 | Jorja Fox | (England) | 2021 | 28 August 2003 (age 22) | Homegrown |
Midfielders
| 5 | Sophie Ingle | (Wales) | 2018 | 2 September 1991 (age 34) | (England) Liverpool |
| 8 | Melanie Leupolz | (Germany) | 2020 | 14 April 1994 (age 32) | (Germany) Bayern Munich |
| 11 | Guro Reiten | (Norway) | 2019 | 26 July 1994 (age 31) | (Norway) LSK Kvinner |
| 13 | Kateřina Svitková | (Czech Republic) | 2022 | 20 March 1996 (age 30) | (England) West Ham United |
| 17 | Jessie Fleming | (Canada) | 2020 | 11 March 1998 (age 28) | (United States) UCLA Bruins |
| 19 | Johanna Rytting Kaneryd | (Sweden) | 2022 | 12 February 1997 (age 29) | (Sweden) BK Häcken |
| 22 | Erin Cuthbert | (Scotland) | 2016 | 19 July 1998 (age 27) | (Scotland) Glasgow City |
| 28 | Jelena Čanković | (Serbia) | 2022 | 13 August 1995 (age 30) | (Sweden) FC Rosengård |
| 34 | Charlotte Wardlaw | (England) | 2019 | 20 February 2003 (age 23) | Homegrown |
Forwards
| 10 | Lauren James | (England) | 2021 | 29 September 2001 (age 24) | (England) Manchester United |
| 14 | Fran Kirby | (England) | 2015 | 29 June 1993 (age 33) | (England) Reading |
| 20 | Sam Kerr | (Australia) | 2019 | 10 September 1993 (age 32) | (United States) Chicago Red Stars |
| 23 | Pernille Harder | (Denmark) | 2020 | 15 November 1992 (age 33) | (Germany) Wolfsburg |
| 33 | Agnes Beever-Jones | (England) | 2021 | 27 July 2003 (age 22) | Homegrown |

=== Academy players ===
| Position | Name | Nat | Since | Date of birth (age) | Signed from |
|---|---|---|---|---|---|
| FW | Aimee Claypole | (England) | 2022 | 8 November 2004 (age 21) | Academy |
| 2 | Ashanti Akpan | (England) | 2023 | 24 November 2004 (age 21) | Academy |
| FW | Reanna Blades | (England) | 2023 | 2 October 2004 (age 21) | Academy |
| DF | Cerys Brown | (England) | 2023 | 22 June 2004 (age 22) | Academy |
| MF | Zarah Dilan | (Iraq) | 2023 | 29 July 2004 (age 21) | Academy |
| MF | Kori Sinckler | (England) | 2023 | 15 January 2003 (age 23) | Academy |
| FW | Ria Bose | (England) | 2022 | 7 February 2006 (age 20) | Academy |
| FW | Tatiana Flores | (Mexico) | 2023 | 15 September 2005 (age 20) | Academy |
| GK | Niamh Samura | (England) | 2023 | 18 April 2004 (age 22) | Academy |
| GK | Olivia Hutchinson | (England) | 2023 | 19 February 2004 (age 22) | Academy |
| FW | Lauren Everstone | (England) | 2023 | 29 December 2003 (age 22) | Academy |
| MF | Amelia Halawi | (England) | 2023 | 30 September 2004 (age 21) | Academy |
| DF | Daisy Hind | (England) | 2023 | 19 March 2006 (age 20) | Academy |
| GK | Olivia Hutchinson | (England) | 2023 | 19 February 2004 (age 22) | Academy |
| MF | Lola Nesbeth | (England) | 2023 | 14 November 2007 (age 18) | Academy |
| RW | Lexi Potter | (England) | 2023 | 19 February 2004 (age 22) | Academy |

=== New contracts ===
| No. | Pos | Player/Manager | Date | Contract end | Source |
|---|---|---|---|---|---|
| 7 | DF | (England) Jess Carter | 1 June 2022 | 2023 | |
| 18 | DF | (Norway) Maren Mjelde | 1 June 2022 | 2023 | |
| 4 | DF | (England) Millie Bright | 11 August 2022 | 2025 | |
| 29 | DF | (England) Jorja Fox | 23 August 2022 | 2025 | |
| 33 | FW | (England) Aggie Beever-Jones | 25 August 2022 | 2025 | |
| 7 | DF | (England) Jess Carter | 18 October 2022 | 2025 | |
| 17 | MF | (Canada) Jessie Fleming | 2 November 2022 | 2025 | |
| 22 | MF | (Scotland) Erin Cuthbert | 17 November 2022 | 2025 | |
| 5 | MF | (Wales) Sophie Ingle | 29 December 2022 | 2025 | |
| 8 | MF | (Germany) Melanie Leupolz | 10 January 2023 | 2026 | |
| 3 | DF | (Netherlands) Aniek Nouwen | 21 January 2023 | 2025 | |
| 1 | GK | (Sweden) Zećira Mušović | 7 February 2023 | 2025 | |
| 14 | FW | (England) Fran Kirby | 24 May 2023 | 2024 | |

== Transfers and loans ==
=== In ===
| Pos | Player | Transferred From | Fee | Date | Source |
|---|---|---|---|---|---|
| DF | (France) Ève Périsset | (France) Bordeaux | Undisclosed | 8 June 2022 | |
| DF | (Canada) Kadeisha Buchanan | (France) Lyon | Undisclosed | 10 June 2022 | |
| FW | (Czech Republic) Kateřina Svitková | (England) West Ham United | Undisclosed | 6 July 2022 | |
| FW | (England) Lucy Watson | (England) Sheffield United | Undisclosed | 19 July 2022 | |
| MF | (Sweden) Johanna Rytting Kaneryd | (Sweden) BK Häcken | Undisclosed | 5 August 2022 | |
| FW | (Japan) Maika Hamano | (Japan) INAC Kobe Leonessa | Undisclosed | 13 January 2023 | |
| FW | (Serbia) Jelena Čanković | (Sweden) FC Rosengård | Undisclosed | 26 August 2022 | |

=== Out ===
| Pos | Player | Transferred To | Fee | Date | Source |
|---|---|---|---|---|---|
| MF | (South Korea) Ji So-yun | (South Korea) Suwon | Free | 24 May 2022 | |
| DF | (Sweden) Jonna Andersson | (Sweden) Hammarby | Free | 1 June 2022 | |
| MF | (Jamaica) Drew Spence | (England) Tottenham Hotspur | Free | 20 June 2022 | |
| GK | (Wales) Poppy Soper | (England) Charlton Athletic | Undisclosed | 4 August 2022 | |
| FW | Bethany England | (England) Tottenham Hotspur | Undisclosed | 4 January 2023 | |

=== Loan out ===
| Pos | Player | Loaned To | Fee | Date | Source |
|---|---|---|---|---|---|
| FW | (England) Emma Thompson | (England) Lewes | Free | 27 July 2022 | |
| FW | (England) Lucy Watson | (England) Charlton Athletic | Free | 12 August 2022 | |
| DF | (England) Jorja Fox | (England) Brighton & Hove Albion | Free | 23 August 2022 | |
| FW | (England) Aggie Beever-Jones | (England) Everton | Free | 25 August 2022 | |
| FW | (Japan) Maika Hamano | (Sweden) Hammarby IF | Free | 13 January 2023 | |
| DF | (Netherlands) Aniek Nouwen | (Italy) AC Milan | Free | 21 January 2023 | |
| MF | (England) Charlotte Wardlaw | (England) Lewes | Free | 21 January 2023 | |

== Management team ==
As of 7 July 2022

| Position | Staff |
|---|---|
| Manager | (England) Emma Hayes |
| Assistant manager | (England) Paul Green |
| Head of technical/Goalkeeping coach | (England) Stuart Searle |
| Assistant coach | (United States) Denise Reddy |
| Opposition analyst & coach | (England) Leanne Champ |

== Kits ==
| Home | Home alt. | Away | Away alt. | Third | Third alt. | Goalkeeper 1 | Goalkeeper 2 | Goalkeeper 3 |

== Pre-season ==
| August 17, 2022 2022 Women's International Champions Cup | Lyon (France) | 2–2 (4–3 p) | (England) Chelsea | Portland, Oregon |
| 17:30 PDT | Marques (yellow card) 71'; Horan 76'; Bruun 88' | Report | Kerr 8'; Cuthbert (yellow card) 45+3'; James 51'; Périsset (yellow card) 86' | Stadium: Providence Park; Referee: Natalie Simon (United States) |
| | Penalties |
| | Horan (penalty missed); Malard (penalty scored); Bruun (penalty scored); Cayman (penalty scored); Benyahia (penalty scored) | | (penalty scored) Périsset; (penalty missed) Cuthbert; (penalty scored) Nouwen; (penalty missed) Bright; (penalty scored) Buchanan |

| August 20, 2022 2022 Women's International Champions Cup | Portland Thorns (United States) | 0–1 | (England) Chelsea | Portland, Oregon |
| 17:00 PDT | | Report | Reiten 64' | Stadium: Providence Park; Attendance: 11,447; Referee: Alyssa Nichols (United States) |

| 28 August 2022 Preseason Friendly | (England) Chelsea | 2–0 | Tottenham Hotspur (England) | Kingston upon Thames |
| 2:00PM GMT | Harder 15'; James 40' | Report | | Stadium: Kingsmeadow; Attendance: 2,400 |

== Competitions ==
=== Women's Super League ===
==== League table ====
| Pos | Team | Pld | W | D | L | GF | GA | GD | Pts | Qualification or relegation |
|---|---|---|---|---|---|---|---|---|---|---|
| 1 | Chelsea (C) | 22 | 19 | 1 | 2 | 66 | 15 | +51 | 58 | Qualification for the Champions League group stage (Note: England's UEFA association coefficient meant, as the 4th ranked association, the WSL champions qualified for the second round. However, as 2022–23 UEFA Women's Champions League winners Barcelona had already qualified for the group stage as 2022–23 Liga F champions, the title holders' berth to the group stage was redistributed to Chelsea.) |
| 2 | Manchester United | 22 | 18 | 2 | 2 | 56 | 12 | +44 | 56 | Qualification for the Champions League second round |
| 3 | Arsenal | 22 | 15 | 2 | 5 | 49 | 16 | +33 | 47 | Qualification for the Champions League first round |
| 4 | Manchester City | 22 | 15 | 2 | 5 | 50 | 25 | +25 | 47 | |
| 5 | Aston Villa | 22 | 11 | 4 | 7 | 47 | 37 | +10 | 37 | |

Source: Women's Super League
Rules for classification: 1) Points; 2) Goal difference; 3) Number of goals scored.
(C) Champions

==== Results summary ====
| Overall | | | | | | | | Home | | | | | | Away | | | | | |
| Pld | W | D | L | GF | GA | GD | Pts | W | D | L | GF | GA | GD | W | D | L | GF | GA | GD |
|---|---|---|---|---|---|---|---|---|---|---|---|---|---|---|---|---|---|---|---|
| 22 | 19 | 1 | 2 | 66 | 15 | +51 | 58 | 11 | 0 | 0 | 35 | 6 | +29 | 8 | 1 | 2 | 31 | 9 | +22 |

Last updated: 27 May 2023.
Source: FA WSL

==== Results by matchday ====
| Matchday | 1 | 2 | 3 | 4 | 5 | 6 | 7 | 8 | 9 | 10 | 11 | 12 | 13 | 14 | 15 | 16 | 17 | 18 | 19 | 20 | 21 | 22 |
|---|---|---|---|---|---|---|---|---|---|---|---|---|---|---|---|---|---|---|---|---|---|---|
| Result | L | W | W | W | W | W | W | W | W | W | D | W | W | W | L | W | W | W | W | W | W | W |
| Position | 8 | 5 | 4 | 3 | 3 | 3 | 2 | 1 | 1 | 1 | 1 | 1 | 2 | 1 | 3 | 2 | 3 | 2 | 2 | 1 | 1 | 1 |

Updated to match(es) played on 27 May 2023. Source: FA WSL
W = Win; D = Draw; L = Loss

==== Matches ====
| 18 September 2022 2 | Liverpool | 2–1 | Chelsea | Birkenhead |
| 14:00 BST | Holland (yellow card) 18'; Stengel 67' (pen.), 87' (pen.); Campbell (yellow card) 90+4' | Report | Kirby 3' (pen.) | Stadium: Prenton Park; Attendance: 3,006; Referee: Emily Heaslip |

| 25 September 2022 3 | Chelsea | 2–0 | Manchester City | Kingston upon Thames |
| 14:00 BST | Kirby 42'; Mjelde 78' (pen.) | Report | Ouahabi (yellow card) 52' | Stadium: Kingsmeadow; Attendance: 4,403; Referee: Abigail Byrne |

| 28 September 2022 1 | Chelsea | 3–1 | West Ham United | Kingston upon Thames |
| 19:05 BST | Kirby 40'; Kerr 58'; Bright 62'; James (penalty missed) 77' | Report | Brynjarsdóttir 3'; Cissoko (yellow card) 48'; Ziu (yellow card) 74'; Parker (yellow card) 76' | Stadium: Kingsmeadow; Attendance: 2,842; Referee: Tom Reeves |
Note: This match, originally scheduled to be played on 11 September 2022, was included in the league-wide postponement due to the death of Queen Elizabeth II. Match re-arranged and moved from Stamford Bridge to Kingsmeadow.

| 16 October 2022 4 | Everton | 1–3 | Chelsea | Liverpool |
| 14:00 BST | Buchanan 53' (o.g.) | Report | Harder 37', 59' (pen.); Charles 90+5' | Stadium: Walton Hall Park; Attendance: 1,668; Referee: Lauren Impey |

| 23 October 2022 5 | Brighton & Hove Albion | 0–2 | Chelsea | Crawley |
| 14:00 BST | Olme (yellow card) 86' | Report | England 58'; Harder 86' | Stadium: Broadfield Stadium; Attendance: 3,626; Referee: Abigail Byrne |

| 30 October 2022 6 | Chelsea | 3–1 | Aston Villa | Kingston upon Thames |
| 14:00 BST | James 22', 47'; Kerr 63'; Ingle (yellow card) 90' | Report | Daly 38'; Blindkilde (yellow card) 45+1' | Stadium: Kingsmeadow; Attendance: 4,373; Referee: Martin Woods |

| 6 November 2022 7 | Manchester United | 1–3 | Chelsea | Leigh |
| 18:45 GMT (UTC+00:00) | Russo 71'; Turner (yellow card) 90' | Report | Kerr 60'; James 64'; Cuthbert 90+2' | Stadium: Leigh Sports Village; Attendance: 6,186; Referee: Cheryl Foster |

| 20 November 2022 8 | Chelsea | 3–0 | Tottenham Hotspur | Fulham |
| 14:00 GMT (UTC+00:00) | Kerr 12'; Cuthbert 26'; Reiten 36' (pen.) | Report | Ildhusøy (yellow card) 9'; Neville (yellow card) 36'; Summanen (yellow card) 62' | Stadium: Stamford Bridge; Attendance: 38,350; Referee: Rebecca Welch |

| 3 December 2022 9 | Leicester City | 0–8 | Chelsea | Leicester |
| 15:00 GMT (UTC+00:00) | Tierney (yellow card) 36' | Report | Reiten 4'; Fleming 13', 50'; Kirby 39', 82'; Charles 41'; Kerr 45'; England 75' | Stadium: King Power Stadium; Attendance: 3,023; Referee: Amy Fearn |

| 11 December 2022 10 | Chelsea | 3–2 | Reading | Kingston upon Thames |
| 18:45 GMT (UTC+00:00) | Kirby 16'; Čanković 29', 33' | Report | Cooper (yellow card) 49'; Troelsgaard 60'; Eikeland 61'; Bryson (yellow card) 64' | Stadium: Kingsmeadow; Attendance: 1,184; Referee: Kirsty Dowle |

| 15 January 2023 11 | Arsenal | 1–1 | Chelsea | Holloway |
| 14:00 GMT (UTC+00:00) | Little 57' (pen.); McCabe (yellow card) 88' | Report | James (yellow card) 39'; Kerr 89' | Stadium: Emirates Stadium; Attendance: 46,881; Referee: Emily Heaslip |

| 5 February 2023 13 | Tottenham Hotspur | 2–3 | Chelsea | Leyton |
| 12:30 GMT (UTC+00:00) | England 16'; Karczewska 88' | Report | Carter 8'; James 27'; Buchanan (yellow card) 28'; Cuthbert (yellow card) 45+2'; Reiten 64' | Stadium: Brisbane Road; Attendance: 1,880; Referee: Abigail Byrne |

| 8 March 2023 14 | Chelsea | 3–1 | Brighton & Hove Albion | Kingston upon Thames |
| 19:30 GMT (UTC+00:00) | Reiten 12' (pen.); J. Carter 21'; Rytting Kaneryd 71' | Report | Sarri (yellow card) 68'; D. Carter 88' | Stadium: Kingsmeadow; Attendance: 916; Referee: Abigail Byrne |

| 12 March 2023 15 | Chelsea | 1–0 | Manchester United | Kingston upon Thames |
| 14:00 GMT (UTC+00:00) | Kerr 23'; Leupolz (yellow card) 34' | Report | | Stadium: Kingsmeadow; Attendance: 3,277; Referee: Cheryl Foster |

| 26 March 2023 16 | Manchester City | 2–0 | Chelsea | Manchester |
| 12:40 BST | Angeldahl 21'; Hemp 30', (yellow card) 73'; Kelly (yellow card) 84' | Report | | Stadium: Academy Stadium; Attendance: 5,222; Referee: Paul Howard |

| 2 April 2023 17 | Aston Villa | 0–3 | Chelsea | Walsall |
| 18:45 BST | | Report | Čanković 22'; Reiten 43'; Kerr 56'; Buchanan (yellow card) 90+4' | Stadium: Bescot Stadium; Attendance: 3,835; Referee: Louise Saunders |

| 3 May 2023 12 | Chelsea | 2–1 | Liverpool | Kingston upon Thames |
| 19:15 GMT (UTC+00:00) | Charles 41'; Kerr 86' | Report | Koivisto 2', (yellow card) 34'; Kirby (yellow card) 85' | Stadium: Kingsmeadow; Attendance: 1,664; Referee: Abigail Byrne |
Note: This match was initially scheduled for 22 January 2023. The match kicked off but was abandoned in the 5th minute due to safety concerns over a frozen pitch.

| 7 May 2023 20 | Chelsea | 7–0 | Everton | Kingston upon Thames |
| 18:45 BST | Reiten 12'; Kerr 25'; Harder 33', 81'; Ingle 44'; Fleming 45+2'; Cuthbert 90+2' | Report | | Stadium: Kingsmeadow; Attendance: 2,074; Referee: Lisa Benn |

| 10 May 2023 18 | Chelsea | 6–0 | Leicester City | Kingston upon Thames |
| 19:00 BST | Reiten 8'; Cuthbert 18'; Harder 32', 42'; James 56'; Fleming (yellow card) 72'; Čanković 90+3' | Report | Cain (yellow card) 73' | Stadium: Kingsmeadow; Attendance: 1,308; Referee: Rebecca Welch |
Note: This match, originally scheduled to be played on 23 April 2023, was postponed due to Chelsea's progression to the semi-finals of the UEFA Women's Champions League.

| 17 May 2023 19 | West Ham United | 0–4 | Chelsea | Dagenham |
| 20:15 BST | Cissoko (yellow card) 28' | Report | Charles 13'; Harder 48'; Ingle 64'; Cuthbert 90+3' | Stadium: Victoria Road; Attendance: 1,373; Referee: Louise Saunders |
Note: This match, originally scheduled to be played on 30 April 2023, was postponed due to Chelsea's progression to the semi-finals of the UEFA Women's Champions League.

| 21 May 2023 21 | Chelsea | 2–0 | Arsenal | Kingston upon Thames |
| 12:30 BST | Reiten 22'; Eriksson 41' | Report | Wubben-Moy (yellow card) 34'; McCabe (yellow card) 45+1', (penalty missed) 60' | Stadium: Kingsmeadow; Attendance: 3,456; Referee: Abigail Byrne |

| 27 May 2023 22 | Reading | 0–3 | Chelsea | Reading |
| 14:30 BST | Cooper (yellow card) 3' | Report | Kerr 18', 88'; Reiten 42' | Stadium: Madejski Stadium; Attendance: 6,305; Referee: Rebecca Welch |

=== FA Cup ===
| 29 January 2023 Fourth round proper | Chelsea | 3–2 | Liverpool | Kingston upon Thames |
| 13:00 GMT (UTC+00:00) | Kerr 32', 52', 79' | Report | Holland 62'; Bonner 85' | Stadium: Kingsmeadow; Attendance: 2,682; Referee: Stacey Fullicks |

| 26 February 2023 Fifth round proper | Chelsea | 2–0 | Arsenal | Kingston upon Thames |
| 14:00 GMT (UTC+00:00) | Ingle 21'; Charles (yellow card) 45'; Kerr 56' | Report | Maritz (yellow card) 90+4' | Stadium: Kingsmeadow; Attendance: 2,888; Referee: Abigail Byrne |

| 19 March 2023 Quarter-final | Reading | 1–3 | Chelsea | Reading |
| 14:00 GMT (UTC+00:00) | Hendrix (yellow card) 25'; Bryson (yellow card) 45+3'; Troelsgaard (yellow card) 53', (goal) 70' | Report | Carter 23'; Mjelde 26' (pen.); Reiten 51' | Stadium: Madejski Stadium; Attendance: 1,865; Referee: Carl Brook |

| 16 April 2023 Semi-final | Aston Villa | 0–1 | Chelsea | Walsall |
| 14:15 BST | | Report | Kerr 59'; Mušović (yellow card) 84' | Stadium: Bescot Stadium; Attendance: 5,292; Referee: Cheryl Foster |

| 14 May 2023 Final | Manchester United | 0–1 | Chelsea | London |
| 14:30 BST | | Report | Reiten (yellow card) 53'; Charles (yellow card) 56'; Kerr 68'; James (yellow card) 80'; Ingle (yellow card) 87' | Stadium: Wembley Stadium; Attendance: 77,390; Referee: Emily Heaslip |

=== League Cup ===
==== Knockout phase ====
| 25 January 2023 Quarter-final | Tottenham Hotspur | 1–3 | Chelsea | Leyton |
| 20:00 GMT (UTC+00:00) | Ayane (yellow card) 67'; Spence 90+4' | Report | Kerr 38', 86'; Kirby 68'; Reiten (yellow card) 75'; James (yellow card) 90+5' | Stadium: Brisbane Road; Attendance: 657; Referee: Stacey Pearson |

| 9 February 2023 Semi-final | West Ham United | 0–7 | Chelsea | Dagenham |
| 19:15 GMT (UTC+00:00) | | Report | Kerr 3', 22', 45+1', 60'; Kirby 10'; Eriksson (yellow card) 53'; James 55'; Reiten 65' | Stadium: Chigwell Construction Stadium; Attendance: 1,092; Referee: Louise Saunders |

| 5 March 2023 Final | Chelsea | 1–3 | Arsenal | Selhurst |
| 15:00 GMT (UTC+00:00) | Kerr 2'; Leupolz (yellow card) 51'; James (yellow card) 83' | Report | Blackstenius 16'; Little 24' (pen.); McCabe (yellow card) 32'; Charles 45+5' (o.g.); Foord (yellow card) 90+6' | Stadium: Selhurst Park; Attendance: 19,010; Referee: Kirsty Dowle |

=== UEFA Women's Champions League ===
==== Group stage ====
Chelsea were drawn into Group A alongside Paris Saint Germain, Real Madrid and Vllaznia.

| Pos | Team | Pld | W | D | L | GF | GA | GD | Pts | Qualification | CHE | PAR | MAD | VLL |
|---|---|---|---|---|---|---|---|---|---|---|---|---|---|---|
| 1 | (England) Chelsea | 6 | 5 | 1 | 0 | 19 | 1 | +18 | 16 | Advance to Quarter-finals | — | 3–0 | 2–0 | 8–0 |
| 2 | (France) Paris Saint-Germain | 6 | 3 | 1 | 2 | 11 | 5 | +6 | 10 | Advance to Quarter-finals | 0–1 | — | 2–1 | 5–0 |
| 3 | (Spain) Real Madrid | 6 | 2 | 2 | 2 | 9 | 6 | +3 | 8 | | 1–1 | 0–0 | — | 5–1 |
| 4 | (Albania) Vllaznia | 6 | 0 | 0 | 6 | 1 | 28 | −27 | 0 | | 0–4 | 0–4 | 0–2 | — |

Source: UEFA
Rules for classification: Group stage tiebreakers

| 20 October 2022 1 | Paris Saint-Germain (France) | 0–1 | (England) Chelsea | Paris |
| 21:00 | Ilestedt (yellow card) 34' | Report | Buchanan (yellow card) 16'; Bright 27' | Stadium: Stade Jean-Bouin; Attendance: 5,222; Referee: Ewa Augustyn (Poland) |

| 26 October 2022 2 | Chelsea (England) | 8–0 | (Albania) Vllaznia | Kingston upon Thames |
| 21:00 | Kerr 10', 37', 57', 60'; Périsset (yellow card) 21'; Harder 38', 72', 88'; Carter (yellow card) 73'; Svitková 78' | Report | | Stadium: Kingsmeadow; Attendance: 3,022; Referee: Sabina Bolic (Croatia) |

| 23 November 2022 3 | Chelsea (England) | 2–0 | (Spain) Real Madrid | Kingston upon Thames |
| 21:00 | Ingle 67'; James (yellow card) 69'; Cuthbert 76' | Report | González (yellow card) 57' | Stadium: Kingsmeadow; Attendance: 3,336; Referee: Maria Sole Caputi (Italy) |

| 8 December 2022 4 | Real Madrid (Spain) | 1–1 | (England) Chelsea | Madrid |
| 21:00 | del Castillo (yellow card) 21'; Weir 36' | Report | M. Rodríguez 59' (o.g.); Carter (yellow card) 63'; James (yellow card) 66' | Stadium: Alfredo Di Stéfano Stadium; Attendance: 1,883; Referee: Kateryna Monzul (Ukraine) |

| 16 December 2022 5 | Vllaznia (Albania) | 0–4 | (England) Chelsea | Shkodër |
| 18:45 | Gjergji (yellow card) 25'; Popović (yellow card) 44' | Report | Ingle 12'; Kirby 20'; Svitková 87'; Mjelde 90+3' (pen.) | Stadium: Loro Boriçi Stadium; Attendance: 220; Referee: Karoline Wacker (Germany) |

| 22 December 2022 6 | Chelsea (England) | 3–0 | (France) Paris Saint-Germain | Fulham |
| 21:00 | Kerr 42'; James 55', 62' | Report | | Stadium: Stamford Bridge; Attendance: 10,129; Referee: Iuliana Demetrescu (Romania) |

==== Quarter-finals ====
| 22 March 2023 First leg | Lyon (France) | 0–1 | (England) Chelsea | Décines-Charpieu |
| 18:45 CET | | Report | Reiten 28'; Ingle (yellow card) 54'; Cuthbert (yellow card) 57' | Stadium: Parc Olympique Lyonnais; Attendance: 18,751; Referee: Tess Olofsson (Sweden) |

| 30 March 2023 Second leg | Chelsea (England) | 1–2 (a.e.t.) (2–2 agg.) (4–3 p) | (France) Lyon | Fulham |
| 20:00 BST | Ingle (yellow card) 117'; Mjelde 120+8' (pen.) | Report | Gilles 77'; Van de Donk (yellow card) 84'; Däbritz 110'; Marozsán (yellow card) 120+1' | Stadium: Stamford Bridge; Attendance: 15,111; Referee: Ivana Martinčić (Croatia) |
| | Penalties |
| | Mjelde (penalty scored); Kerr (penalty scored); Fleming (penalty scored); James (penalty missed); Carter (penalty scored) | | (penalty scored) Marozsán; (penalty scored) Hegerberg; (penalty missed) Renard; (penalty scored) Däbritz; (penalty missed) Horan |

==== Semi-finals ====
| 22 April 2023 First leg | Chelsea (England) | 0–1 | (Spain) Barcelona | Fulham |
| 12:30 BST | Kerr (yellow card) 38'; James (yellow card) 71' | Report | Graham Hansen 4'; León (yellow card) 41'; Walsh (yellow card) 63'; Paños (yellow card) 90+3' | Stadium: Stamford Bridge; Attendance: 27,697; Referee: Jana Adámková (Czech Republic) |

| 27 April 2023 Second leg | Barcelona (Spain) | 1–1 (2–1 agg.) | (England) Chelsea | Barcelona |
| 18:45 CEST | Graham Hansen 63' | Report | Reiten (yellow card) 18', (goal) 67'; Cuthbert (yellow card) 90' | Stadium: Camp Nou; Attendance: 72,262; Referee: Esther Staubli (Switzerland) |

== Statistics ==
=== Appearances and goals ===
As of 27 May 2023

| No. | Pos | Nat | Player | Total | | FA WSL | | FA Cup | | League Cup | | Champions League | |
| No. | Pos | Nat | Player | Apps | Goals | Apps | Goals | Apps | Goals | Apps | Goals | Apps | Goals |
|---|---|---|---|---|---|---|---|---|---|---|---|---|---|
Goalkeepers:
| 1 | GK | (Sweden) SWE | Zećira Mušović | 14 | 0 | 7 | 0 | 3 | 0 | 1 | 0 | 3 | 0 |
| 30 | GK | (Germany) GER | Ann-Katrin Berger | 26 | 0 | 15 | 0 | 2 | 0 | 2 | 0 | 7 | 0 |
| 32 | GK | (England) ENG | Emily Orman | 0 | 0 | 0 | 0 | 0 | 0 | 0 | 0 | 0 | 0 |
Defenders:
| 4 | DF | (England) ENG | Millie Bright | 25 | 2 | 14 | 1 | 3 | 0 | 3 | 0 | 5 | 1 |
| 7 | DF | (England) ENG | Jess Carter | 31 | 3 | 9+8 | 2 | 3+2 | 1 | 1 | 0 | 5+3 | 0 |
| 15 | DF | (France) FRA | Ève Périsset | 32 | 0 | 13+5 | 0 | 3 | 0 | 3 | 0 | 6+2 | 0 |
| 16 | DF | (Sweden) SWE | Magdalena Eriksson | 36 | 1 | 18+2 | 1 | 4+1 | 0 | 2 | 0 | 8+1 | 0 |
| 18 | DF | (Norway) NOR | Maren Mjelde | 18 | 4 | 6+1 | 1 | 3+1 | 1 | 0+1 | 0 | 3+3 | 2 |
| 21 | DF | (England) ENG | Niamh Charles | 39 | 4 | 15+6 | 4 | 4+1 | 0 | 2+1 | 0 | 8+2 | 0 |
| 26 | DF | (Canada) CAN | Kadeisha Buchanan | 28 | 0 | 14+2 | 0 | 1+1 | 0 | 1+1 | 0 | 8 | 0 |
| 27 | DF | (Russia) RUS | Alsu Abdullina | 9 | 0 | 0+6 | 0 | 1 | 0 | 0+1 | 0 | 0+1 | 0 |
| 38 | DF | (England) ENG | Cerys Brown | 1 | 0 | 0 | 0 | 0+1 | 0 | 0 | 0 | 0 | 0 |
Midfielders:
| 5 | MF | (Wales) WAL | Sophie Ingle | 38 | 5 | 15+6 | 2 | 2+3 | 1 | 3 | 0 | 7+2 | 2 |
| 8 | MF | (Germany) GER | Melanie Leupolz | 17 | 0 | 5+2 | 0 | 2+2 | 0 | 0+2 | 0 | 4 | 0 |
| 11 | MF | (Norway) NOR | Guro Reiten | 39 | 13 | 18+3 | 9 | 5 | 1 | 3 | 1 | 10 | 2 |
| 13 | MF | (Czech Republic) CZE | Kateřina Svitková | 5 | 2 | 1+2 | 0 | 0 | 0 | 0 | 0 | 0+2 | 2 |
| 17 | MF | (Canada) CAN | Jessie Fleming | 36 | 3 | 14+6 | 3 | 3+2 | 0 | 0+2 | 0 | 4+5 | 0 |
| 19 | MF | (Sweden) SWE | Johanna Rytting Kaneryd | 37 | 1 | 7+13 | 1 | 1+3 | 0 | 0+3 | 0 | 2+8 | 0 |
| 22 | MF | (Scotland) SCO | Erin Cuthbert | 33 | 6 | 16+2 | 5 | 4 | 0 | 3 | 0 | 8 | 1 |
| 28 | MF | (Serbia) SRB | Jelena Čanković | 22 | 4 | 6+8 | 4 | 2 | 0 | 2+1 | 0 | 2+1 | 0 |
| 36 | MF | (England) ENG | Ashanti Akpan | 1 | 0 | 0 | 0 | 0+1 | 0 | 0 | 0 | 0 | 0 |
Forwards:
| 10 | FW | (England) ENG | Lauren James | 33 | 8 | 15+3 | 5 | 4 | 0 | 3 | 1 | 4+4 | 2 |
| 14 | FW | (England) ENG | Fran Kirby | 16 | 9 | 5+3 | 6 | 1 | 0 | 1+1 | 2 | 3+2 | 1 |
| 20 | FW | (Australia) AUS | Sam Kerr | 38 | 29 | 19+2 | 12 | 4 | 6 | 3 | 6 | 10 | 5 |
| 23 | FW | (Denmark) DEN | Pernille Harder | 15 | 11 | 7+3 | 8 | 0+1 | 0 | 0 | 0 | 2+2 | 3 |
| 31 | FW | (England) ENG | Aimee Claypole | 2 | 0 | 0+1 | 0 | 0+1 | 0 | 0 | 0 | 0 | 0 |
| 37 | FW | (England) ENG | Reanna Blades | 1 | 0 | 0 | 0 | 0+1 | 0 | 0 | 0 | 0 | 0 |
Players have left the club:
| 3 | DF | (Netherlands) NED | Aniek Nouwen | 4 | 0 | 1+2 | 0 | 0 | 0 | 0 | 0 | 1 | 0 |
| 9 | FW | (England) ENG | Bethany England | 10 | 2 | 2+6 | 2 | 0 | 0 | 0 | 0 | 0+2 | 0 |
| 29 | DF | (England) ENG | Jorja Fox | 0 | 0 | 0 | 0 | 0 | 0 | 0 | 0 | 0 | 0 |
| 33 | FW | (England) ENG | Agnes Beever-Jones | 0 | 0 | 0 | 0 | 0 | 0 | 0 | 0 | 0 | 0 |
| 34 | MF | (England) ENG | Charlotte Wardlaw | 0 | 0 | 0 | 0 | 0 | 0 | 0 | 0 | 0 | 0 |

=== Goalscorers ===
Includes all competitive matches. The list is sorted by squad number when total goals are equal.

As of 27 May 2023

| Rank | Pos. | No. | Player | FA WSL | FA Cup | League Cup | Champions League | Total |
|---|---|---|---|---|---|---|---|---|
| 1 | FW | 20 | (Australia) Sam Kerr | 12 | 6 | 6 | 5 | 29 |
| 2 | MF | 11 | (Norway) Guro Reiten | 9 | 1 | 1 | 2 | 13 |
| 3 | FW | 23 | (Denmark) Pernille Harder | 8 | 0 | 0 | 3 | 11 |
| 4 | FW | 14 | (England) Fran Kirby | 6 | 0 | 2 | 1 | 9 |
| 5 | FW | 10 | (England) Lauren James | 5 | 0 | 1 | 2 | 8 |
| 6 | MF | 22 | (Scotland) Erin Cuthbert | 5 | 0 | 0 | 1 | 6 |
| 7 | MF | 5 | (Wales) Sophie Ingle | 2 | 1 | 0 | 2 | 5 |
| 8 | DF | 18 | (Norway) Maren Mjelde | 1 | 1 | 0 | 2 | 4 |
| 8 | DF | 21 | (England) Niamh Charles | 4 | 0 | 0 | 0 | 4 |
| 8 | MF | 28 | (Serbia) Jelena Čanković | 4 | 0 | 0 | 0 | 4 |
| 11 | DF | 7 | (England) Jess Carter | 2 | 1 | 0 | 0 | 3 |
| 11 | MF | 17 | (Canada) Jessie Fleming | 3 | 0 | 0 | 0 | 3 |
| 13 | DF | 4 | (England) Millie Bright | 1 | 0 | 0 | 1 | 2 |
| 13 | FW | 9 | Bethany England | 2 | 0 | 0 | 0 | 2 |
| 13 | MF | 13 | (Czech Republic) Kateřina Svitková | 0 | 0 | 0 | 2 | 2 |
| 16 | DF | 16 | (Sweden) Magdalena Eriksson | 1 | 0 | 0 | 0 | 1 |
| 16 | MF | 19 | (Sweden) Johanna Rytting Kaneryd | 1 | 0 | 0 | 0 | 1 |
| Own goal | | | | 0 | 0 | 0 | 1 | 1 |

=== Assists ===
Includes all competitive matches. The list is sorted by squad number when total assists are equal.

As of 27 May 2023

| Rank | Pos. | No. | Player | FA WSL | FA Cup | League Cup | Champions League | Total |
|---|---|---|---|---|---|---|---|---|
| 1 | MF | 11 | (Norway) Guro Reiten | 11 | 2 | 2 | 4 | 19 |
| 2 | FW | 20 | (Australia) Sam Kerr | 5 | 0 | 0 | 2 | 7 |
| 2 | MF | 22 | (Scotland) Erin Cuthbert | 3 | 0 | 2 | 2 | 7 |
| 4 | DF | 21 | (England) Niamh Charles | 3 | 2 | 0 | 1 | 6 |
| 4 | MF | 28 | (Serbia) Jelena Čanković | 2 | 1 | 1 | 2 | 6 |
| 6 | FW | 10 | (England) Lauren James | 2 | 1 | 2 | 0 | 5 |
| 6 | FW | 23 | (Denmark) Pernille Harder | 3 | 1 | 0 | 1 | 5 |
| 8 | MF | 5 | (Wales) Sophie Ingle | 3 | 0 | 1 | 0 | 4 |
| 8 | DF | 15 | (France) Ève Périsset | 3 | 0 | 1 | 0 | 4 |
| 8 | MF | 19 | (Sweden) Johanna Rytting Kaneryd | 3 | 0 | 1 | 0 | 4 |
| 11 | FW | 14 | (England) Fran Kirby | 1 | 1 | 0 | 1 | 3 |
| 11 | DF | 27 | (Russia) Alsu Abdullina | 1 | 1 | 0 | 1 | 3 |
| 13 | DF | 4 | (England) Millie Bright | 1 | 0 | 0 | 1 | 2 |
| 14 | DF | 7 | (England) Jess Carter | 1 | 0 | 0 | 0 | 1 |
| 14 | MF | 13 | (Czech Republic) Kateřina Svitková | 1 | 0 | 0 | 0 | 1 |
| 14 | MF | 17 | (Canada) Jessie Fleming | 1 | 0 | 0 | 0 | 1 |

=== Clean sheets ===
Includes all competitive matches. The list is sorted by squad number when total clean sheets are equal.

As of 27 May 2023

| Rank | Pos. | No. | Player | FA WSL | FA Cup | League Cup | Champions League | Total |
|---|---|---|---|---|---|---|---|---|
| 1 | GK | 30 | (Germany) Ann-Katrin Berger | 8 | 2 | 1 | 3 | 14 |
| 2 | GK | 1 | (Sweden) Zećira Mušović | 3 | 1 | 0 | 3 | 7 |

=== Disciplinary records ===
Includes all competitive matches. The list is sorted by squad number when total disciplinary records are equal.

As of 27 May 2023

| Pos. | No. | Name | FA WSL | | FA Cup | | League Cup | | Champions League | | Total | |
| Pos. | No. | Name | Booked | Sent off (straight red) | Booked | Sent off (straight red) | Booked | Sent off (straight red) | Booked | Sent off (straight red) | Booked | Sent off (straight red) |
|---|---|---|---|---|---|---|---|---|---|---|---|---|
| GK | 1 | (Sweden) Zećira Mušović | 0 | 0 | 1 | 0 | 0 | 0 | 0 | 0 | 1 | 0 |
| MF | 5 | (Wales) Sophie Ingle | 1 | 0 | 1 | 0 | 0 | 0 | 2 | 0 | 4 | 0 |
| DF | 7 | (England) Jess Carter | 0 | 0 | 0 | 0 | 0 | 0 | 2 | 0 | 2 | 0 |
| MF | 8 | (Germany) Melanie Leupolz | 1 | 0 | 0 | 0 | 1 | 0 | 0 | 0 | 2 | 0 |
| FW | 10 | (England) Lauren James | 1 | 0 | 1 | 0 | 2 | 0 | 3 | 0 | 7 | 0 |
| MF | 11 | (Norway) Guro Reiten | 0 | 0 | 1 | 0 | 1 | 0 | 1 | 0 | 3 | 0 |
| DF | 15 | (France) Ève Périsset | 0 | 0 | 0 | 0 | 0 | 0 | 1 | 0 | 1 | 0 |
| DF | 16 | (Sweden) Magdalena Eriksson | 0 | 0 | 0 | 0 | 1 | 0 | 0 | 0 | 1 | 0 |
| MF | 17 | (Canada) Jessie Fleming | 1 | 0 | 0 | 0 | 0 | 0 | 0 | 0 | 1 | 0 |
| FW | 20 | (Australia) Sam Kerr | 0 | 0 | 0 | 0 | 0 | 0 | 1 | 0 | 1 | 0 |
| DF | 21 | (England) Niamh Charles | 0 | 0 | 2 | 0 | 0 | 0 | 0 | 0 | 2 | 0 |
| MF | 22 | (Scotland) Erin Cuthbert | 1 | 0 | 0 | 0 | 0 | 0 | 2 | 0 | 3 | 0 |
| DF | 26 | (Canada) Kadeisha Buchanan | 2 | 0 | 0 | 0 | 0 | 0 | 1 | 0 | 3 | 0 |

== Awards ==
WSL GOAL of the month; Scotland Erin Cuthbert (vs. Tottenham Hotspur)

WSL GOAL of the month; England Lauren James (vs. Tottenham Hotspur)

WSL GOAL of the month; Australia Sam Kerr (vs. Manchester United)

WSL Manager of the Month; Emma Hayes and Denise Reddy

FWA Footballer of the Year; Sam Kerr

Barclays WSL Manager of the Season; Emma Hayes

FA cup final Player of the match; Sam Kerr

WSL Academy cup final Player of the match; Reanna Blades
