= Frannie Crouse =

American former soccer player

Personal information
- Full name: Frances Emeline Crouse
- Date of birth: September 21, 1995 (age 31)
- Place of birth: Latrobe, Pennsylvania, United States
- Height: 5 ft 7 in (1.70 m)
- Position: Forward

Youth career
- Beadling SC
- 2011–2014: Greensburg Central Catholic

College career
Years	Team	Apps	(Gls)
2014–2017	Penn State Nittany Lions	92	(37)

Senior career*
Years	Team	Apps	(Gls)
2018	North Carolina Courage	1	(1)

International career
2017	United States U23		
- * Club domestic league appearances and goals

Frances Emeline Crouse (born September 21, 1995) is an American former soccer player who played as a forward for the North Carolina Courage in the National Women's Soccer League.

== Early life ==
Crouse was born in Latrobe, Pennsylvania, to parents Samuel and Thursa Crouse. She has two other siblings: Samantha and Colby. Crouse played club soccer with Beadling Soccer Club, helping her team win three State Cup Championships and bronze medal in the US Youth Soccer National Championships in 2010.

== College career ==
Crouse attended Penn State University, majoring in advertising and public relations. In her final year at Penn State, she was named to the MAC Hermann Trophy Watch List.

== Club career ==
=== North Carolina Courage, 2018 ===
Coming off an injury in her senior year at Penn State, Crouse was drafted 10th overall by the North Carolina Courage in the 2018 NWSL College Draft, in which she was surprised to be drafted to begin with. She obtained her first professional cap and first professional goal on June 3, 2018, against the Houston Dash. She was released by the Courage on June 15 but would continue to train with the club. On June 22, realizing NWSL rosters were locked, Crouse said, "I mean they are basically full, so I was hoping that maybe they would consider me, but if it doesn't and that was my last game I ever played in the NWSL I left on a good note. Something I'll always remember." By July, she was no longer with the team, and by January 2019, Crouse declared herself retired.

== Career statistics ==
Appearances and goals by club, season and competition
Club	League	Season	League		Playoffs		Total	
Club	League	Season	Apps	Goals	Apps	Goals	Apps	Goals
North Carolina Courage	NWSL							
North Carolina Courage	NWSL	2018	1	1	0	0	1	1
Career total			1	1	0	0	1	1

== Honors ==
Penn State Nittany Lions

- NCAA Division I Women's Soccer Championship: 2015
