= 2018 Women's International Champions Cup =

Tournament details
- Host country: United States
- Dates: July 26 – 29
- Teams: 4 (from 2 confederations)
- Venue: 1 (in 1 host city)

Final positions
- Champions: North Carolina Courage
- Runners-up: Lyon
- Third place: Manchester City
- Fourth place: Paris Saint-Germain

Tournament statistics
- Matches played: 4
- Goals scored: 10 (2.5 per match)
- Top scorer: Eugénie Le Sommer (2 goals)

The 2018 Women's International Champions Cup was the first edition of a series of friendly women's association football matches. It took place from July 26 to 29, 2018 in the United States.

For the first time, the ICC included a women's tournament. Nearly a dozen of the regular ICC participant clubs expressed interest in sending their women's sides, but the inaugural women's tournament featured just four teams before expanding in the 2019 ICC. The 2018 tournament featured the semi-finals on July 26, followed by third place play-off and final on July 29, all four matches being held at Hard Rock Stadium in Miami Gardens, Florida. The European participants joined for training sessions at the University of Portland before the tournament.

== Teams ==
Four teams participated in the tournament. English club Chelsea were originally scheduled to participate, but were later replaced by Lyon.

Nation	Team	Reason for qualification
England	Manchester City	Won 2016-17 Women's FA Cup
France	Lyon	Won 2017-18 UEFA Women's Champions League
France	Paris Saint-Germain	Won 2017–18 Division 1 Féminine
United States	North Carolina Courage	Won 2017 NWSL Shield

== Venue ==
Miami Gardens, Florida	Location of the host city of the 2018 Women's International Champions Cup.
Hard Rock Stadium	Location of the host city of the 2018 Women's International Champions Cup.
Capacity: 64,767	Location of the host city of the 2018 Women's International Champions Cup.

== Bracket ==
Semi-finals
July 26 – Miami Gardens, FL
(United States) North Carolina Courage	2
(France) Paris Saint-Germain	1
July 26 – Miami Gardens, FL
(France) Lyon	3
(England) Manchester City	0

Final
July 29 – Miami Gardens, FL
(United States) North Carolina Courage	1
(France) Lyon	0
Third place play-off
July 29 – Miami Gardens, FL
(France) Paris Saint-Germain	1
(England) Manchester City	2

== Matches ==
=== Semi-finals ===
July 26, 2018
18:15 EDT

North Carolina Courage (United States)	2–1	(France) Paris Saint-Germain
McDonald 19'; Jenkins 84'	Report	Kurtz 40' (o.g.)

Hard Rock Stadium, Miami Gardens, Florida
Referee: Natalie Simon (United States)

July 26, 2018
21:00 EDT

Lyon (France)	3–0	(England) Manchester City
Le Sommer 4', 14'; Hegerberg 17'	Report

Hard Rock Stadium, Miami Gardens, Florida
Referee: Jasmine Peralta (United States)

=== Third place play-off ===
July 29, 2018
18:15 EDT

Paris Saint-Germain (France)	1–2	(England) Manchester City
Pekel 1'	Report	Scott 41'; Jans 45+4'

Hard Rock Stadium, Miami Gardens, Florida
Referee: Natalie Simon (United States)

=== Final ===
July 29, 2018
21:00 EDT

North Carolina Courage (United States)	1–0	(France) Lyon
O'Reilly 10'	Report

Hard Rock Stadium, Miami Gardens, Florida
Referee: Jasmine Peralta (United States)

== See also ==
- 2018 International Champions Cup
- International Women's Club Championship
