= Women's International Champions Cup =

- Organizer(s): Relevent Sports Group
- Founded: 2018; 8 years ago
- Teams: 4
- Current champion: Lyon (2022; 2nd title)
- Most championships: Lyon (2 titles)
- Website: www.internationalchampionscup.com/womens-schedule
- 2022 Women's International Champions Cup

The Women's International Champions Cup (WICC) was an annual club women's soccer invitational tournament in the United States. Launched by Relevent Sports Group in 2018, it features four women's soccer teams from America and Europe competing for the championship. As FIFA currently only organizes a men's club world championship—the FIFA Club World Cup—the competition aims to be the annual decider for the best women's club soccer team in the world.

The tournament was last played in 2022. Relevent Sports Group, the promoter, has not indicated whether more tournaments are forthcoming.

== List of finals ==
Year	Winners	Score	Runners-up	Third place	Score	Fourth place
2018	(United States) North Carolina Courage	1–0	(France) Lyon	(England) Manchester City	2–1	(France) Paris Saint-Germain
2019	(France) Lyon	1–0	(United States) North Carolina Courage	(England) Manchester City	3–2	(Spain) Atlético Madrid
2021	(United States) Portland Thorns	1–0	(France) Lyon	(Spain) Barcelona	3–2	(United States) Houston Dash
2022	(France) Lyon	4–0	(Mexico) Monterrey	(England) Chelsea	1–0	(United States) Portland Thorns

== Results by club ==
Club	Winners	Runners-up	Third place
(France) Lyon	2 (2019, 2022)	2 (2018, 2021)	
(United States) North Carolina Courage	1 (2018)	1 (2019)	
(United States) Portland Thorns	1 (2021)		
(Mexico) Monterrey		1 (2022)	
(England) Manchester City			2 (2018, 2019)
(Spain) Barcelona			1 (2021)
(England) Chelsea			1 (2022)

== Broadcasting ==
In 2022, the matches of the Women's International Champions Cup were broadcast in more than 175 countries via DAZN and on their YouTube channel.

== See also ==
- International Champions Cup, the men's tournament by the same organizers
- The Women's Cup, hosted by Racing Louisville FC in the United States
- UEFA Women's Champions League
- AFC Women's Club Championship
- CAF Women's Champions League
