= Abby Erceg =

New Zealand footballer (born 1989)

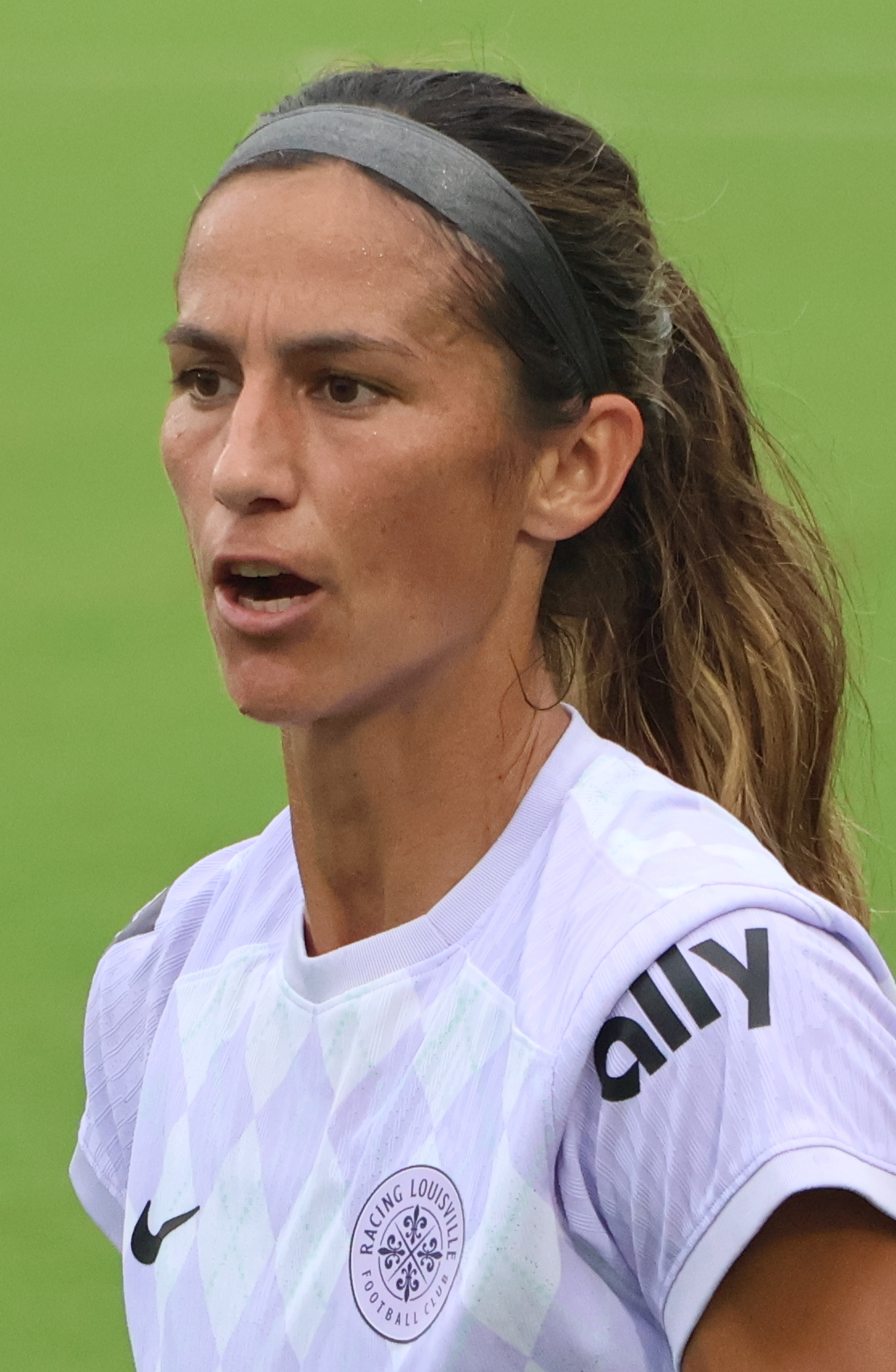
- Erceg with Racing Louisville FC in 2024

Personal information
- Full name: Abby May Erceg
- Date of birth: 20 November 1989 (age 36)
- Place of birth: Whangārei, New Zealand
- Height: 1.77 m (5 ft 10 in)
- Position: Centre-back

Team information
- Current team: Wellington Phoenix
- Number: 6

Youth career
- –2004: Three Kings United

Senior career*
Years	Team	Apps	(Gls)
2004–2006	Three Kings United	36	(17)
2007–2008	Western Springs FC	22	(12)
2009	Three Kings United	23	(15)
2009–2010	Espanyol	0	(0)
2010	Fencibles United	25	(14)
2011–2013	Adelaide United	22	(0)
2013–2014	FF USV Jena	30	(5)
2014–2015	Chicago Red Stars	26	(0)
2016	Western New York Flash	19	(2)
2017–2022	North Carolina Courage	73	(4)
2023–2024	Racing Louisville	48	(2)
2025–2026	Toluca	41	(5)
2026–	Wellington Phoenix	0	(0)

International career
2007–2009	New Zealand U-20	24	(13)
2006–2023	New Zealand	146	(6)
- * Club domestic league appearances and goals as of 31 January 2026

Abby May Erceg (born 20 November 1989) is a New Zealand professional footballer who plays as a centre-back for A-League Women club Wellington Phoenix. She formerly played for the New Zealand national team, where she became the first player (male or female) from New Zealand to play 100 international matches.

Erceg played 11 seasons in the National Women's Soccer League (NWSL) between 2014 and 2024, playing for the Chicago Red Stars, the Western New York Flash, the North Carolina Courage, and Racing Louisville. She won one NWSL Championship with the Flash and two NWSL Championships and three NWSL Shields with the Courage.

== Early life ==
Erceg attended Mount Roskill Grammar School.

== Club career ==
Erceg playing for the Wellington Phoenix in 2026.

Erceg with German side Jena in 2013. She was loaned to the Chicago Red Stars, an NWSL club, and played there for two months during the Bundesliga's 2014 summer break. After she returned and played the first half of the 2014–15 Bundesliga season, she and the Jena club ended her contract during the winter break.

Erceg then signed with the Chicago Red Stars in May 2014.

In November 2015, the Red Stars traded her to the Western New York Flash.

In 2016, she captained the Western New York Flash to a NWSL League Championship.

Erceg became part of the North Carolina Courage in 2017 after the Western New York Flash were sold to the owners of North Carolina FC. She would remain captain as the Courage won the 2017 NWSL Shield and appeared in the 2017 NWSL Final where they lost 1–0 to the Portland Thorns. Erceg was named to the NWSL Second XI for the 2017 season.

Erceg was named the NWSL Team of the Month for May, June, July & August in the 2018 season. She helped the Courage to win their second straight NWSL shield. North Carolina broke the record for fewest goals conceded during a season, and only suffered 1 loss. The North Carolina Courage won the 2018 NWSL Championship after beating the Portland Thorns 3–0. They didn't concede a goal in either of their play-off games. Erceg was named to the 2018 NWSL Best XI and was named 2018 NWSL Defender of the Year.

Erceg was again named in the NWSL Second XI and nominated for Defender of the Year for 2019 as the Courage won the NWSL Shield and Championship again.

In January 2023, the Courage traded Erceg, along with Carson Pickett, to Racing Louisville FC in exchange for Emily Fox. She played every minute of the 2023 and 2024 seasons with Racing.

Erceg joined Mexican club Toluca in February 2025.

On 6 August 2026, Erceg signed for the Wellington Phoenix of the A-League Women. She was signed to a one-year contract for the 2026–27 season.

== International career ==
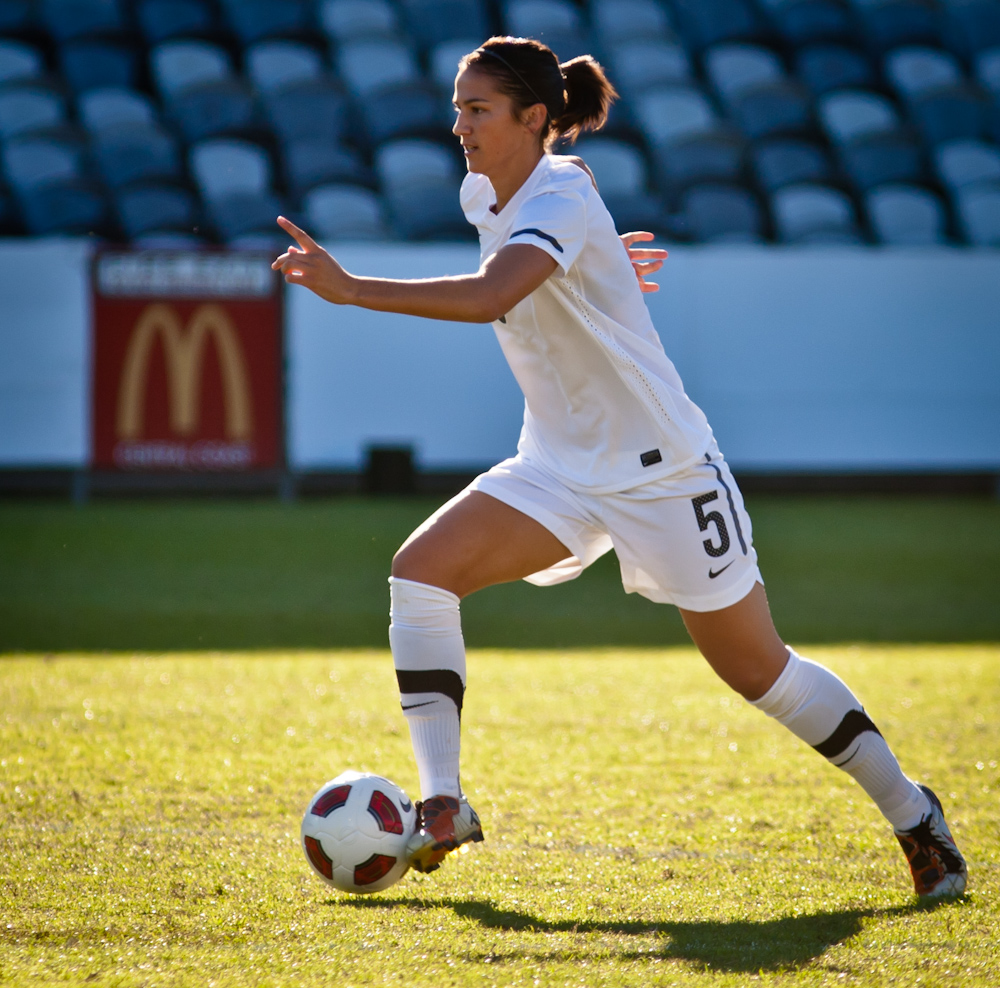
Abby Erceg at the 2015 FIFA Women's World Cup

Erceg made her full Football Ferns début in a 0–3 loss to China on 14 November 2006, and represented New Zealand at the 2007 FIFA Women's World Cup finals in China, where they lost to Brazil 0–5, Denmark (0–2) and China (0–2).

Erceg was also included in the New Zealand squad for the 2008 Summer Olympics where they drew with Japan (2–2) before losing to Norway (0–1) and USA (0–4). In the following tournament, Erceg helped New Zealand reach the quarterfinals, the Ferns' first ever knockout game in a FIFA tournament. There they lost 2–0 to the United States.

She was included in the U-20 squad for the 2008 Women's U-20 World Cup finals in Chile. Erceg earned her 50th cap for New Zealand aged just 21 when starting New Zealand's 2011 Cyprus Cup opening match against the Netherlands on 2 March 2011 and becoming the third most capped female player in New Zealand Football history with 62 caps to her name. Erceg was also a part of the team that qualified for the Women's Football World Cup that took place in Germany, in 2011 where they finished 12th overall.

Erceg's experience led her to be named captain of the Football Ferns in 2014. In the first game of the 2014 OFC Women's Nations Cup, she became the first player from New Zealand to reach 100 international caps.

She featured in all New Zealand's three matches at the 2015 FIFA Women's World Cup in Canada. Erceg was named for the 2016 Olympics squad, which will be her sixth international tournament representing New Zealand.

In February 2017, Erceg announced her retirement from the international game on social media, writing "Due to the unfortunate and unfavourable circumstances within the organisation that is NZF, it is with regret and great sadness that today is the day that I announce my retirement from the international game. Without being able to justify my involvement any longer I will be stepping back in the hopes to create change for the current and future generations of NZ footballers."

In February 2018, Erceg came out of retirement to play for New Zealand in their two friendlies against Scotland in Spain. She then retired again for the second time in May 2018 before New Zealand's friendly against Japan.

In January 2019, Erceg came back out of international retirement ahead of the 2019 Cup of Nations and the 2019 FIFA Women's World Cup.

In April 2019, Erceg was named to the final 23-player squad for the 2019 FIFA Women's World Cup.

In June 2021, Erceg was named to the roster for the 2020 Summer Olympics.

In January 2023, Erceg again retired from the national team.

== International goals ==
No.	Date	Venue	Opponent	Score	Result	Competition	Ref
1.	9 April 2007	Sir Ignatius Kilage Stadium, Lae, Papua New Guinea	Tonga	3–0	6–1	2007 OFC Women's Championship	
2.	29 September 2010	North Harbour Stadium, Auckland, New Zealand	Vanuatu	7–0	14–0	2010 OFC Women's Championship	
3.	1 October 2010	North Harbour Stadium, Auckland, New Zealand	Cook Islands	8–0	10–0	2010 OFC Women's Championship	
4.	29 October 2014	Kalabond Oval, Kokopo, Papua New Guinea	Cook Islands	2–0	11–0	2014 OFC Women's Nations Cup	
5.	23 January 2016	PNGFA Academy, Lae, Papua New Guinea	Papua New Guinea	6–0	7–1	2016 OFC Women's Olympic Qualifying Tournament	

== Personal life ==
Erceg is of Croatian-Māori descent, and affiliates to the Ngāpuhi iwi.

She has previously dated Courage teammate Kristen Hamilton and Courage and Racing teammate Carson Pickett.

== Honours ==
Western New York Flash

- NWSL Champions: 2016

North Carolina Courage

- NWSL Champions: 2018, 2019
- NWSL Shield: 2017, 2018, 2019
- NWSL Challenge Cup: 2022

Individual

- NWSL Defender of the Year: 2018
- NWSL Best XI: 2018
- NWSL Second XI: 2017, 2019, 2020
- IFFHS OFC Woman Team of the Decade 2011–2020
