= 2022 Women's International Champions Cup =

Tournament details
- Host country: United States
- Dates: August 17 – 20
- Teams: 4 (from 2 confederations)
- Venue: 1 (in 1 host city)

Final positions
- Champions: (France) Lyon (2nd title)
- Runners-up: (Mexico) Monterrey
- Third place: (England) Chelsea
- Fourth place: (United States) Portland Thorns

Tournament statistics
- Matches played: 4
- Goals scored: 11 (2.75 per match)
- Top scorer(s): (United States) Lindsey Horan (3 goals)

The 2022 Women's International Champions Cup was a friendly tournament of women's association football matches. It was the fourth edition of the Women's International Champions Cup and took place in Portland, Oregon, United States, from August 17 to 20, 2022. Portland Thorns FC was the defending champion.

Lyon emerged the winners, defeating Monterrey 4–0 in the final, while Chelsea won the third-place match.

== Teams ==
On the basis of their results in 2022, four teams participated in the tournament.

| Nation | Team | Reason for qualification |
|---|---|---|
| United States | Portland Thorns | Won 2021 NWSL Shield and 2021 NWSL Challenge Cup |
| Mexico | Monterrey | Won 2021 Liga MX Femenil Torneo Apertura |
| France | Lyon | Won 2021-22 UEFA Women's Champions League and 2021–22 Division 1 Féminine |
| England | Chelsea | Won 2021–22 FA WSL and 2021–22 Women's FA Cup |

== Venue ==
| Portland, Oregon | Location of the host city of the 2022 Women's International Champions Cup. |
|---|---|
| Providence Park | Location of the host city of the 2022 Women's International Champions Cup. |
| Capacity: 25,218 | Location of the host city of the 2022 Women's International Champions Cup. |

== Bracket ==
Semi-finals
August 17 – Portland, OR
(France) Lyon (p) | 2 (4)
(England) Chelsea | 2 (3)
August 17 – Portland, OR
(Mexico) Monterrey (p) | 1 (3)
(United States) Portland Thorns | 1 (2)

Final
August 20 – Portland, OR
(France) Lyon | 4
(Mexico) Monterrey | 0
Third place play-off
August 20 – Portland, OR
(England) Chelsea | 1
(United States) Portland Thorns | 0

== Matches ==
=== Semi-finals ===
August 17, 2022
17:30 PDT

| Lyon (France) | 2–2 | (England) Chelsea |
|---|---|---|
| Marques (yellow card) 71'; Horan 76'; Bruun 88' | | Kerr 8'; Cuthbert (yellow card) 45+3'; James 51'; Périsset (yellow card) 86' |
Penalties
| Horan (penalty missed); Malard (penalty scored); Bruun (penalty scored); Cayman (penalty scored); Benyahia (penalty scored) | 4–3 | (penalty scored) Périsset; (penalty missed) Cuthbert; (penalty scored) Nouwen; (penalty missed) Bright; (penalty scored) Buchanan |

Providence Park, Portland, Oregon
Referee: Natalie Simon (United States)

August 17, 2022
20:00 PDT

| Monterrey (Mexico) | 1–1 | (United States) Portland Thorns |
|---|---|---|
| Olivieri (yellow card) 45+3'; García 68' | | Everett 5'; Hubly (yellow card) 45' |
Penalties
| Bernal (penalty missed); Solís (penalty scored); Franco (penalty scored); Rodríguez (penalty scored) | 3–2 | (penalty missed) Weaver; (penalty missed) Sinclair; (penalty scored) Betfort; (penalty scored) Coffey; (penalty missed) Beckie |

Providence Park, Portland, Oregon
Referee: Katja Koroleva (United States)

=== Third place play-off ===
August 20, 2022
17:00 PDT

| Portland Thorns (United States) | 0–1 | (England) Chelsea |
|---|---|---|
| | Report | Reiten 64' |

Providence Park, Portland, Oregon
Attendance: 11,447
Referee: Alyssa Nichols (United States)

=== Final ===
August 20, 2022
20:00 PDT

| Lyon (France) | 4–0 | (Mexico) Monterrey |
|---|---|---|
| Horan 39' (pen.), 43'; Däbritz 53'; Bruun 64' |

Providence Park, Portland, Oregon
Referee: Alicia Messer (United States)

== Goalscorers ==
There were 11 goals scored in 4 matches, for an average of 2.75 goals per match.

3 goals

- (United States) Lindsey Horan, LYO

2 goals

- (Denmark) Signe Bruun, LYO

1 goal

- (England) Lauren James, CHE
- (Australia) Sam Kerr, CHE
- (Norway) Guro Reiten, CHE
- (Germany) Sara Däbritz, LYO
- (Mexico) Diana García, MON
- (United States) Marissa Everett, POR

== See also ==
- Women's Champions League (UEFA)
- National Women's Soccer League (United States)
- Women's Super League (England)
- Division 1 (France)
