= 2019 Women's International Champions Cup =

Tournament details
- Host country: United States
- Dates: August 15–18
- Teams: 4 (from 2 confederations)
- Venue: 1 (in 1 host city)

Final positions
- Champions: (France) Lyon
- Runners-up: (United States) North Carolina Courage
- Third place: (England) Manchester City
- Fourth place: (Spain) Atlético Madrid

Tournament statistics
- Matches played: 4
- Goals scored: 10 (2.5 per match)
- Top scorer: 10 players (1 goal each)

The 2019 International Champions Cup Women's Tournament was a tournament of friendly women's association football matches. It was the second edition of the Women's International Champions Cup and took place in Cary, North Carolina, United States, from August 15 to 18, 2019.

The tournament was hosted by the defending champions, the North Carolina Courage at the 10,000-seater Sahlen's Stadium. The matches were organized into two doubleheaders, with the semifinals played on August 15 and the final and third-place match on August 18. For the first time, there was a cash prize awarded to the winning team, paid for by new sponsor Budweiser. The tournament was also broadcast on ESPN.

The final, played on August 18, was a rematch between North Carolina and Lyon. Lyon won 1–0 in front of 8,208 fans.

== Teams ==
Four teams participated in the tournament.

| Nation | Team | Reason for qualification |
|---|---|---|
| England | Manchester City | Won 2018-19 FA Women's League Cup |
| France | Lyon | Won 2018-19 UEFA Women's Champions League |
| Spain | Atlético Madrid | Won 2018-19 Primera División Femenil |
| United States | North Carolina Courage | Won 2018 National Women's Soccer League |

== Venue ==
| Cary, North Carolina | Location of the host city of the 2019 Women's International Champions Cup. |
|---|---|
| Sahlen's Stadium | Location of the host city of the 2019 Women's International Champions Cup. |
| Capacity: 10,000 | Location of the host city of the 2019 Women's International Champions Cup. |

== Bracket ==
Semi-finals
August 15 – Cary, NC
(France) Lyon | 1
(Spain) Atlético Madrid | 0
August 15 – Cary, NC
(United States) NC Courage | 2
(England) Manchester City | 1

Final
August 18 – Cary, NC
(France) Lyon | 1
(United States) NC Courage | 0
Third place play-off
August 18 – Cary, NC
(Spain) Atlético Madrid | 2
(England) Manchester City | 3

== Matches ==
=== Semi-finals ===
August 15, 2019
17:00 EDT

| Lyon (France) | 1–0 | (Spain) Atlético Madrid |
|---|---|---|
| Renard 90+1' | Report |

Sahlen's Stadium, Cary, North Carolina

August 15, 2019
19:30 EDT

| North Carolina Courage (United States) | 2–1 | (England) Manchester City |
|---|---|---|
| Meehan 84'; McDonald 90+3' | Report | Stanway 41' |

Sahlen's Stadium, Cary, North Carolina
Attendance: 5,436

=== Third place play-off ===
August 18, 2019
17:00 EDT

| Atlético Madrid (Spain) | 2–3 | (England) Manchester City |
|---|---|---|
| Torrecilla 58'; Sosa 63' | Report | Hemp 22'; Beckie 83'; Wullaert 90+3' |

Sahlen's Stadium, Cary, North Carolina

=== Final ===
August 18, 2019
19:00 EDT

| Lyon (France) | 1–0 | (United States) North Carolina Courage |
|---|---|---|
| Marozsán 57' | Report |

Sahlen's Stadium, Cary, North Carolina
Attendance: 8,208

== See also ==
- 2019 International Champions Cup
- International Women's Club Championship
