= 2018 National Women's Soccer League season =

6th season of the National Women's Soccer League

National Women's Soccer League
- Season: 2018
- Champions: North Carolina Courage
- NWSL Shield: North Carolina Courage
- Matches: 108
- Goals: 278 (2.57 per match)
- Top goalscorer: Sam Kerr (16 goals)
- Highest scoring: ORL 3–4 NCC (May 23); CHI 2–5 ORL (May 26); HOU 6–1 SKY (August 25)
- Longest winning run: 4 games North Carolina Courage (March 24 – April 18) (May 12 - May 30)
- Longest unbeaten run: 12 games North Carolina Courage (March 24 – June 3)
- Longest winless run: 23 games Sky Blue FC (March 31 – September 4)
- Longest losing run: 10 games Washington Spirit (June 23 – August 25)
- Highest attendance: 21,144; POR 3–1 SEA (September 7)
- Lowest attendance: 1,913; SKY 0–1 SEA (April 15)
- Total attendance: 650,562
- Average attendance: 6,024
- All statistics correct as of September 8, 2018.

The 2018 National Women's Soccer League season was the sixth season of the National Women's Soccer League, the top division of women's soccer in the United States. Including the NWSL's two professional predecessors, Women's Professional Soccer (2009–2011) and the Women's United Soccer Association (2001–2003), it was the twelfth overall season of FIFA and USSF-sanctioned top division women's soccer in the United States. The league is operated by the United States Soccer Federation and receives major financial backing from that body. Further financial backing is provided by the Canadian Soccer Association. Both national federations pay the league salaries of many of their respective national team members in an effort to nurture talent in those nations and take the financial burden off individual clubs.

The off-season brought significant changes, with FC Kansas City and the Boston Breakers ceasing operations, while new club Utah Royals FC joined the league. The 2018 season began on March 24, and ended on September 8. Teams once again played 24 regular-season games this year, with the top four teams making a single-elimination playoff. The North Carolina Courage won the NWSL Shield with 15 more points than second place Thorns. The NWSL Playoffs began on September 15 with the two semifinal matches, which were won by the Thorns and the Courage. The NWSL Championship Game was held on September 22 at Providence Park in Portland. The Courage won 3–0, becoming the first team to win both the NWSL Shield and the NWSL Championship in the same season.

== Teams, stadiums, and personnel ==
=== Stadiums and locations ===
Two teams, the Dash and Reign, do not make their stadiums' entire capacity available for home games, instead restricting ticket sales at a lower level. The full capacities of their venues are included in parentheses and italics.

Team	Stadium	Capacity
Chicago Red Stars	Toyota Park	20,000
Houston Dash	BBVA Compass Stadium	7,000 (22,039)
North Carolina Courage	Sahlen's Stadium at WakeMed Soccer Park	10,000
Orlando Pride	Orlando City Stadium	25,500
Portland Thorns	Providence Park	21,144
Seattle Reign FC	Memorial Stadium	6,088 (12,000)
Sky Blue FC	Yurcak Field	5,000
Utah Royals FC	Rio Tinto Stadium	20,213
Washington Spirit	Maryland SoccerPlex	4,000

Locations National Women's Soccer League teams.

=== Personnel and sponsorship ===
Note: All of the teams use Nike as their kit manufacturer.

Team	Head coach	Shirt sponsor
Chicago Red Stars	(United States) Rory Dames	Magellan Corporation
Houston Dash	(Netherlands) Vera Pauw	BBVA Compass
North Carolina Courage	(England) Paul Riley	Continental AG
Orlando Pride	(Scotland) Tom Sermanni	Orlando Health
Portland Thorns	(England) Mark Parsons	Providence Health & Services
Seattle Reign FC	(North Macedonia) Vlatko Andonovski	Microsoft
Sky Blue FC	(United States) Denise Reddy	Meridian Health
Utah Royals FC	(England) Laura Harvey	Conservice
Washington Spirit	(United States) Tom Torres (interim)	ProChain Solutions, Inc.

=== Coaching changes ===
Team	Outgoing manager	Manner of departure	Date of vacancy	Incoming manager	Date of appointment	Ref.
Seattle Reign FC	(England) Laura Harvey	Mutual separation	November 7, 2017	(North Macedonia) Vlatko Andonovski	November 7, 2017	
Sky Blue FC		Vacant	August 16, 2017	(United States) Denise Reddy	November 15, 2017	
Utah Royals FC	New franchise			(England) Laura Harvey	November 27, 2017	
Houston Dash	(United States) Omar Morales	End of interim period	September 29, 2017	(Netherlands) Vera Pauw	November 27, 2017	
Washington Spirit	(United States) Jim Gabarra	Fired	August 21, 2018	(United States) Tom Torres (interim)	August 21, 2018	

== Competition format ==
- Each team will play each team 3 times, for a total of 24 games (12 home and 12 away).
- The four teams at the end of the season with the most points qualify for the playoffs.

== League standings ==
Pos	Team	Pld	W	D	L	GF	GA	GD	Pts	
1	North Carolina Courage (C)	24	17	6	1	53	17	+36	57	NWSL Shield
2	Portland Thorns FC	24	12	6	6	40	28	+12	42	NWSL Playoffs
3	Seattle Reign FC	24	11	8	5	27	19	+8	41	NWSL Playoffs
4	Chicago Red Stars	24	9	10	5	38	28	+10	37	NWSL Playoffs
5	Utah Royals FC	24	9	8	7	22	23	−1	35	
6	Houston Dash	24	9	5	10	35	39	−4	32	
7	Orlando Pride	24	8	6	10	30	37	−7	30	
8	Washington Spirit	24	2	5	17	12	35	−23	11	
9	Sky Blue FC	24	1	6	17	21	52	−31	9	

Source: NWSL
Rules for classification: Tiebreakers
(C) Champions

=== Tiebreakers ===
The initial determining factor for a team's position in the standings is most points earned, with three points earned for a win, one point for a draw, and zero points for a loss. If two or more teams tie in point total, when determining rank and playoff qualification and seeding, the NWSL uses the following tiebreaker rules, going down the list until all teams are ranked.

1. Head-to-head win–loss record between the teams (or points-per-game if more than two teams).
2. Greater goal difference across the entire season (against all teams, not just tied teams).
3. Greatest total number of goals scored (against all teams).
4. Apply #1–3 to games played on the road.
5. Apply #1–3 to games played at home.
6. If teams are still equal, ranking will be determined by a coin toss.

NOTE: If two clubs remain tied after another club with the same number of points advances during any step, the tie breaker reverts to step 1 of the two-club format.

== Attendance ==
=== Average home attendances ===
Ranked from highest to lowest average attendance.

Team	GP	Attendance	High	Low	Average
Portland Thorns FC	12	203,506	21,144	14,485	16,959
Utah Royals FC	12	113,593	19,203	7,137	9,466
North Carolina Courage	12	61,549	9,505	3,011	5,129
Orlando Pride	12	58,046	9,017	3,104	4,837
Chicago Red Stars	12	48,048	13,678	2,027	4,004
Washington Spirit	12	46,704	7,976	2,433	3,892
Seattle Reign FC	12	45,885	5,251	3,172	3,824
Houston Dash	12	42,859	5,846	2,376	3,572
Sky Blue FC	12	30,372	4,086	1,913	2,531
Total	108	650,562	21,144	1,913	6,024

Updated to games played on September 8, 2018.

=== Highest attendances ===
Regular season

Rank	Home team	Score	Away team	Attendance	Date	Stadium
1	Portland Thorns FC	3–1	Seattle Reign FC	21,144	September 7, 2018	Providence Park
1	Portland Thorns FC	0–3	North Carolina Courage	21,144	September 22, 2018	Providence Park
3	Utah Royals FC	0–1	Chicago Red Stars	19,203	April 14, 2018	Rio Tinto Stadium
4	Portland Thorns FC	2–2	Chicago Red Stars	18,631	August 18, 2018	Providence Park
5	Portland Thorns FC	1–1	Sky Blue FC	18,237	June 27, 2018	Providence Park
6	Portland Thorns FC	2–1	Sky Blue FC	17,986	August 22, 2018	Providence Park
7	Portland Thorns FC	4–0	Utah Royals FC	17,930	July 6, 2018	Providence Park
8	Portland Thorns FC	1–2	Orlando Pride	17,115	May 12, 2018	Providence Park
9	Portland Thorns FC	2–1	Orlando Pride	16,466	April 15, 2018	Providence Park
10	Portland Thorns FC	2–3	Seattle Reign FC	16,054	May 5, 2018	Providence Park

Updated to games played on November 3, 2018.

== Statistical leaders ==
=== Top scorers ===
Rank	Player	Club	Goals
1	(Australia) Sam Kerr	Chicago Red Stars	16
2	(United States) Lynn Williams	North Carolina Courage	14
3	(United States) Lindsey Horan	Portland Thorns FC	13
4	(England) Rachel Daly	Houston Dash	10
5	(England) Jodie Taylor	Seattle Reign FC	9
5	(Canada) Christine Sinclair	Portland Thorns FC	9
7	(Brazil) Debinha	North Carolina Courage	8
7	(United States) Crystal Dunn	North Carolina Courage	8
7	(United States) Sofia Huerta	Houston Dash	8
10	(United States) Tobin Heath	Portland Thorns FC	7
10	(United States) Jessica McDonald	North Carolina Courage	7
10	(United States) Megan Rapinoe	Seattle Reign FC	7

Updated: September 8, 2018

=== Top assists ===
Rank	Player	Club	Assists
1	(United States) Jessica McDonald	North Carolina Courage	8
2	(Japan) Yuki Nagasato	Chicago Red Stars	7
2	(United States) Tobin Heath	Portland Thorns FC	7
4	(United States) Sofia Huerta	Houston Dash	6
4	(United States) Megan Rapinoe	Seattle Reign FC	6
4	(Canada) Christine Sinclair	Portland Thorns FC	6
7	(United States) Crystal Dunn	North Carolina Courage	5
7	(United States) Lynn Williams	North Carolina Courage	5
9	(United States) Danielle Colaprico	Chicago Red Stars	4
9	(United States) Arin Gilliland	Chicago Red Stars	4
9	(United States) Kristen Hamilton	North Carolina Courage	4
9	(United States) Jaelene Hinkle	North Carolina Courage	4
9	(Australia) Sam Kerr	Chicago Red Stars	4
9	(Brazil) Marta	Orlando Pride	4
9	(United States) Christine Nairn	Orlando Pride	4
9	(United States) Kealia Ohai	Houston Dash	4

Updated: September 8, 2018

== NWSL Playoffs ==
The top four teams from the regular season compete for the NWSL Championship. The North Carolina Courage secured the number one seed on August 5, winning their second straight NWSL Shield.

Semi-finals
1	North Carolina Courage	2
4	Chicago Red Stars	0
2	Portland Thorns FC	2
3	Seattle Reign FC	1

Championship
1	North Carolina Courage	3
2	Portland Thorns FC	0

=== Semi-finals ===
September 15, 2018
3:00pm (EDT)

Portland Thorns FC	2–1	Seattle Reign FC
Heath 43'; Horan 77'	Report	Spencer 29'

Providence Park
Portland, Oregon
Attendance: 14,179
Referee: Ramy Touchan
September 18, 2018*
9:00pm (EDT)

North Carolina Courage	2–0	Chicago Red Stars
McDonald 5'; Mewis 86'	Report

Providence Park
Portland, Oregon
Attendance: 4,646
Referee: Tim Ford

*Originally scheduled for September 16 at Sahlen's Stadium in Cary, North Carolina; rescheduled and moved due to Hurricane Florence.

=== Championship ===
September 22, 2018
4:30pm (EDT)

North Carolina Courage	3–0	Portland Thorns FC
Debinha 13'; McDonald 40', 64'	Report; Report

Providence Park
Portland, Oregon
Attendance: 21,144
Referee: Guido Gonzales Jr.

== Individual awards ==
=== Monthly awards ===
==== Player of the Month ====
Month	Player of the Month		Club	Month's Statline
March	(United States)	Megan Rapinoe	Seattle Reign FC	1 goal, 1 assist, 6 shots on goal
April	(United States)	Sofia Huerta	Chicago Red Stars	2 goals, 6 shots on goal, 9 chances created
May	(England)	Rachel Daly	Houston Dash	4 goals, 9 shots on goal, 11 chances created
June	(United States)	Crystal Dunn	North Carolina Courage	2 goals, 9 shots on goal, 8 chances created
July	(United States)	Lindsey Horan	Portland Thorns FC	3 goals, 1 assist, 5 shots on goal, 5 chances created
August	(Australia)	Sam Kerr	Chicago Red Stars	5 goals, 1 assist, 11 shots on goal, 8 chances created

==== Team of the Month ====
Month	Goalkeeper	Defenders	Midfielders	Forwards	Ref
March	(United States) Jane Campbell, HOU	(United States) Jaelene Hinkle, NC (United States) Becky Sauerbrunn, UTA (United States) Emily Sonnett, POR (England) Rachel Daly, HOU	(United States) Lindsey Horan, POR (Brazil) Debinha, NC (Iceland) Gunnhildur Yrsa Jónsdóttir, UTA	(United States) Megan Rapinoe, SEA (United States) Mallory Pugh, WAS (United States) Crystal Dunn, NC	
April	(United States) Aubrey Bledsoe, WAS	(United States) Jaelene Hinkle, NC (United States) Estelle Johnson, WAS (United States) Becky Sauerbrunn, UTA (United States) Emily Sonnett, POR	(United States) Sofia Huerta, CHI (United States) Crystal Dunn, NC (United States) McCall Zerboni, NC	(Nigeria) Francisca Ordega, WAS (United States) Jessica McDonald, NC (United States) Mallory Pugh, WAS	
May	(United States) Abby Smith, UTA	(Australia) Steph Catley, SEA (New Zealand) Abby Erceg, NC (United States) Becky Sauerbrunn, UTA (United States) Ali Krieger, ORL	(United States) Kristie Mewis, HOU (United States) Lindsey Horan, POR (United States) McCall Zerboni, NC	(England) Rachel Daly, HOU (Canada) Christine Sinclair, POR (United States) Crystal Dunn, NC	
June	(United States) Alyssa Naeher, CHI	(United States) Becca Moros, UTA (New Zealand) Abby Erceg, NC (United States) Becky Sauerbrunn, UTA (United States) Merritt Mathias, NC	(United States) Lindsey Horan, POR (Japan) Yuki Nagasato, CHI (United States) McCall Zerboni, NC	(United States) Kealia Ohai, HOU (Canada) Christine Sinclair, POR (United States) Crystal Dunn, NC	
July	(United States) Adrianna Franch, POR	(United States) Katie Naughton, CHI (New Zealand) Abby Erceg, NC (Scotland) Rachel Corsie, UTA (Denmark) Theresa Nielsen, SEA	(United States) Lindsey Horan, POR (Japan) Yuki Nagasato, CHI (United States) McCall Zerboni, NC	(United States) Megan Rapinoe, SEA (England) Rachel Daly, HOU (Australia) Sam Kerr, CHI	
August	(Australia) Lydia Williams, SEA	(United States) Megan Oyster, SEA (New Zealand) Abby Erceg, NC (United States) Taylor Comeau, HOU (Denmark) Theresa Nielsen, SEA	(United States) Lindsey Horan, POR (United States) Sofia Huerta, HOU (United States) Vanessa DiBernardo, CHI	(United States) Lynn Williams, NC (United States) Tobin Heath, POR (Australia) Sam Kerr, CHI	

=== Weekly awards ===
Week	NWSL Player of the Week		NWSL Goal of the Week		NWSL Save of the Week		Reference
Week	Player	Club	Player	Club	Player	Club	Reference
1	(United States) Megan Rapinoe	Seattle Reign FC	(Iceland) Gunnhildur Yrsa Jónsdóttir	Utah Royals FC	(United States) Adrianna Franch	Portland Thorns FC	
2	(United States) Mallory Pugh	Washington Spirit	(United States) Lindsey Horan	Portland Thorns FC	(United States) Jane Campbell	Houston Dash	
3	(United States) McCall Zerboni	North Carolina Courage	(United States) Lindsey Horan	Portland Thorns FC	(United States) Ashlyn Harris	Orlando Pride	
4	(United States) Sofia Huerta	Chicago Red Stars	(United States) Merritt Mathias	North Carolina Courage	(United States) Aubrey Bledsoe	Washington Spirit	
5	(United States) McCall Zerboni	North Carolina Courage	(United States) Tobin Heath	Portland Thorns FC	(United States) Aubrey Bledsoe	Washington Spirit	
6	(United States) Alyssa Naeher	Chicago Red Stars	(Canada) Diana Matheson	Utah Royals FC	(United States) Alyssa Naeher	Chicago Red Stars	
7	(United States) Megan Rapinoe	Seattle Reign FC	(United States) Christine Nairn	Orlando Pride	(United States) Ashlyn Harris	Orlando Pride	
8	(United States) Crystal Dunn	North Carolina Courage	(United States) Carli Lloyd	Sky Blue FC	(United States) Katelyn Rowland	North Carolina Courage	
9	(England) Rachel Daly	Houston Dash	(United States) Sydney Leroux	Orlando Pride	(United States) Ashlyn Harris	Orlando Pride	
10	(Japan) Yuki Nagasato	Chicago Red Stars	(United States) Katherine Reynolds	Portland Thorns FC	(United States) Haley Kopmeyer	Orlando Pride	
11/12	(United States) Aubrey Bledsoe	Washington Spirit	(United States) Brittany Ratcliffe	Utah Royals FC	(United States) Britt Eckerstrom	Portland Thorns FC	
13	(United States) Crystal Dunn	North Carolina Courage	(Australia) Alanna Kennedy	Orlando Pride	(United States) Ashlyn Harris	Orlando Pride	
14	(United States) Adrianna Franch	Portland Thorns FC	(United States) Kealia Ohai	Houston Dash	(United States) Adrianna Franch	Portland Thorns FC	
15	(Australia) Sam Kerr	Chicago Red Stars	(Brazil) Marta	Orlando Pride	(United States) Adrianna Franch	Portland Thorns FC	
16	(United States) Lynn Williams	North Carolina Courage	(United States) Kristen Edmonds	Orlando Pride	(Scotland) Rachel Corsie	Utah Royals FC	
17	(United States) Jane Campbell	Houston Dash	(United States) Toni Pressley	Orlando Pride	(Scotland) Rachel Corsie	Utah Royals FC	
19	(United States) Lynn Williams	North Carolina Courage	(United States) Katie Stengel	Utah Royals FC	(United States) Ashlyn Harris	Orlando Pride	
20	(United States) Adrianna Franch	Portland Thorns FC	(Australia) Hayley Raso	Portland Thorns FC	(United States) Adrianna Franch	Portland Thorns FC	
21	(Mexico) Katie Johnson	Sky Blue FC	(Canada) Christine Sinclair	Portland Thorns FC	(United States) Ashlyn Harris	Orlando Pride	
22	(Australia) Sam Kerr	Chicago Red Stars	(United States) Tobin Heath	Portland Thorns FC	(United States) Ashlyn Harris	Orlando Pride	
24	(United States) Lindsey Horan	Portland Thorns FC	(United States) Lindsey Horan	Portland Thorns FC	(United States) Nicole Barnhart	Utah Royals FC	

=== Annual awards ===
Award	Winner		
Golden Boot	(Australia) Sam Kerr	Chicago Red Stars	16 goals
Coach of the Year	(England) Paul Riley	North Carolina Courage	Won both NWSL Shield & Championship
Rookie of the Year	(United States) Imani Dorsey	Sky Blue FC	4 goals, 1 assist
Goalkeeper of the Year	(United States) Adrianna Franch	Portland Thorns FC	45 saves, three shutouts
Defender of the Year	(New Zealand) Abby Erceg	North Carolina Courage	All 2,160 minutes, fewest goals allowed
Most Valuable Player	(United States) Lindsey Horan	Portland Thorns FC	13 goals, 2 assists, 1,800 minutes

NWSL Best XI
Position	First team		Second team	
Goalkeeper	(United States) Adrianna Franch	Portland Thorns FC	(Australia) Lydia Williams	Seattle Reign FC
Defender	(New Zealand) Abby Erceg	North Carolina Courage	(Australia) Steph Catley	Seattle Reign FC
Defender	(United States) Abby Dahlkemper	North Carolina Courage	(United States) Merritt Mathias	North Carolina Courage
Defender	(United States) Becky Sauerbrunn	Utah Royals FC	(United States) Julie Ertz	Chicago Red Stars
Defender	(United States) Emily Sonnett	Portland Thorns FC	(United States) Emily Menges	Portland Thorns FC
Midfielder	(United States) Tobin Heath	Portland Thorns FC	(Brazil) Debinha	North Carolina Courage
Midfielder	(United States) Lindsey Horan	Portland Thorns FC	(United States) Carli Lloyd	Sky Blue FC
Midfielder	(United States) McCall Zerboni	North Carolina Courage	(Canada) Christine Sinclair	Portland Thorns FC
Forward	(United States) Crystal Dunn	North Carolina Courage	(United States) Sofia Huerta	Houston Dash
Forward	(Australia) Sam Kerr	Chicago Red Stars	(United States) Lynn Williams	North Carolina Courage
Forward	(United States) Megan Rapinoe	Seattle Reign FC	(England) Rachel Daly	Houston Dash

NWSL Championship Game MVP
Player	Club	Record
(United States) Jessica McDonald	North Carolina Courage	2 goals
