= List of English women's football transfers winter 2025–26 =

The 2025–26 English women's football winter transfer window ran from 2 January to 3 February 2026. Players without a club could be signed at any time, clubs could sign players on loan dependent on their league's regulations, and clubs could sign a goalkeeper on an emergency loan if they had no registered senior goalkeeper available. This list includes transfers featuring at least one club from either the Women's Super League or the Women's Super League 2 that were completed after the end of the summer 2025 transfer window on 4 September and before the end of the 2025—26 winter window.

== Transfers ==
All players and clubs without a flag are English.

Date	Name	Moving from	Moving to	Fee	Ref.
11 September 2025	(Spain) Inma Gabarro	Everton	(Spain) Sevilla	Loan	
11 September 2025	(Finland) Milla-Maj Majasaari	Crystal Palace	(Norway) Røa Dynamite Girls	Undisclosed	
14 September 2025	Lucy Watson	Unattached	Durham	Free	
17 September 2025	(New Zealand) Olivia Page	Sheffield United	(Australia) Newcastle Jets	Free	
20 September 2025	(Republic of Ireland) Ruesha Littlejohn	Unattached	Crystal Palace	Free	
25 September 2025	(Republic of Ireland) Katie Keane	Leicester City	Sheffield United	Loan	
28 September 2025	Katie Startup	Manchester City	Everton	Loan	
7 November 2025	Jesse Woolley	Unattached	Portsmouth	Free	
17 December 2025	(Germany) Melina Loeck	Brighton & Hove Albion	(Sweden) Hammarby	Loan	
21 December 2025	Zoe Barratt	Charlton Athletic	AFC Bournemouth	Undisclosed	
1 January 2026	(Norway) Signe Gaupset	(Norway) Brann	Tottenham Hotspur	£378,000	
1 January 2026	(Sweden) Hanna Lundkvist	(United States) San Diego Wave	Manchester United	Free	
1 January 2026	(Sweden) Matilda Nildén	(Sweden) BK Häcken	Tottenham Hotspur	Undisclosed	
1 January 2026	(Germany) Lea Schüller	(Germany) Bayern Munich	Manchester United	Undisclosed	
1 January 2026	(Sweden) Hanna Wijk	(Sweden) BK Häcken	Tottenham Hotspur	Undisclosed	
2 January 2026	(Sweden) Alice Bergström	(Sweden) BK Häcken	Liverpool	Undisclosed	
2 January 2026	Ebonie Locke	Birmingham City	Derby County	Loan	
2 January 2026	(Japan) Asato Miyagawa	(Sweden) Hammarby	Birmingham City	Free	
3 January 2026	Poppy Irvine	Birmingham City	Cheltenham Town	Loan	
4 January 2026	(Japan) Maika Hamano	Chelsea	Tottenham Hotspur	Loan	
5 January 2026	(Norway) Julie Blakstad	(Sweden) Hammarby	Tottenham Hotspur	Free	
5 January 2026	(Sweden) Smilla Holmberg	(Sweden) Hammarby	Arsenal	Undisclosed	
5 January 2026	(Sweden) Emma Jansson	(Sweden) Rosengård	Leicester City	Undisclosed	
6 January 2026	(Germany) Mara Alber	Chelsea	(Germany) Werder Bremen	Loan	
6 January 2026	Sarah Mayling	Aston Villa	Leicester City	Loan	
7 January 2026	(Colombia) Jorelyn Carabalí	Brighton & Hove Albion	(United States) Boston Legacy	Undisclosed	
7 January 2026	(Sweden) Jennifer Falk	(Sweden) BK Häcken	Liverpool	Loan	
7 January 2026	(Finland) Lotta Lindström	London City Lionesses	Birmingham City	Loan	
7 January 2026	Katie Lockwood	(Scotland) Glasgow City	Charlton Athletic	Undisclosed	
8 January 2026	(France) Estelle Cascarino	(Italy) Juventus	West Ham United	Loan	
8 January 2026	(Belgium) Janice Cayman	Leicester City	(Netherlands) PSV Eindhoven	Undisclosed	
8 January 2026	Ashleigh Neville	Tottenham Hotspur	Leicester City	Undisclosed	
8 January 2026	Katie Robinson	Aston Villa	Bristol City	Undisclosed	
8 January 2026	(Norway) Olaug Tvedten	(Norway) Vålerenga	Brighton & Hove Albion	Undisclosed	
9 January 2026	Hannah Blundell	Manchester United	Everton	Loan	
9 January 2026	Shanade Hopcroft	Crystal Palace	Birmingham City	Free	
9 January 2026	(Norway) Anna Jøsendal	(Sweden) Hammarby	Liverpool	Undisclosed	
9 January 2026	Tegan McGowan	Birmingham City	Southampton	Loan	
10 January 2026	Jessie Gale	Arsenal	Bristol City	Loan	
10 January 2026	(United States) Jenna Nighswonger	Arsenal	Aston Villa	Loan	
10 January 2026	Lizzie Waldie	(Scotland) Hearts	Charlton Athletic	Undisclosed	
11 January 2026	(Republic of Ireland) Kelly Brady	(Republic of Ireland) Athlone Town	Crystal Palace	Free	
11 January 2026	(Wales) Hayley Ladd	Everton	Crystal Palace	Undisclosed	
12 January 2026	(France) Oriane Jean-François	Chelsea	Aston Villa	Undisclosed	
12 January 2026	Simone Sherwood	Leicester City	Sheffield United	Loan	
13 January 2026	(Brazil) Geyse	Manchester United	(Mexico) Club América	Undisclosed	
14 January 2026	Ria Bose	(Portugal) Sporting CP	West Ham United	Undisclosed	
14 January 2026	(United States) Sam Coffey	(United States) Portland Thorns	Manchester City	Undisclosed	
14 January 2026	(United States) Michaela Kovacs	(Norway) Vålerenga	Birmingham City	Undisclosed	
15 January 2026	(Hungary) Lauren Brzykcy	(Sweden) Piteå	Bristol City	Free	
15 January 2026	(Australia) Kaitlyn Torpey	(United States) Portland Thorns	Newcastle United	Free	
15 January 2026	(Belgium) Amber Tysiak	West Ham United	(Germany) Union Berlin	Undisclosed	
15 January 2026	Rachel Williams	Manchester United	Leicester City	Undisclosed	
16 January 2026	(Sweden) Wilma Leidhammar	(Sweden) Norrköping	Birmingham City	Undisclosed	
16 January 2026	(Sweden) Emilia Pelgander	Leicester City	(Denmark) HB Køge	Loan	
16 January 2026	(Sweden) Ellen Wangerheim	(Sweden) Hammarby	Manchester United	Undisclosed	
17 January 2026	(Republic of Ireland) Denise O'Sullivan	(United States) North Carolina Courage	Liverpool	Undisclosed	
17 January 2026	(Scotland) Martha Thomas	Tottenham Hotspur	Liverpool	Loan	
18 January 2026	Tammi George	Sheffield United	Wolverhampton Wanderers	Undisclosed	
19 January 2026	(France) Delphine Cascarino	(United States) San Diego Wave	London City Lionesses	Free	
19 January 2026	(Scotland) Colette Cavanagh	(Spain) Deportivo de La Coruña	Ipswich Town	Undisclosed	
19 January 2026	(Switzerland) Aurélie Csillag	(Germany) SC Freiburg	Liverpool	Undisclosed	
19 January 2026	Sophie Hillyerd	London City Lionesses	Watford	Loan	
19 January 2026	(Sweden) Emilia Larsson	(Sweden) Rosengård	Newcastle United	Free	
20 January 2026	Lucy Ashworth-Clifford	(Italy) Lazio	Ipswich Town	Undisclosed	
20 January 2026	(Colombia) Manuela Paví	West Ham United	(Mexico) Deportivo Toluca	Undisclosed	
22 January 2026	Kit Graham	Tottenham Hotspur	Ipswich Town	Loan	
22 January 2026	(Switzerland) Alisha Lehmann	(Italy) Como	Leicester City	Undisclosed	
23 January 2026	Ashanti Akpan	Chelsea	Newcastle United	Undisclosed	
23 January 2026	Lucy Newell	Manchester United	Crystal Palace	Loan	
23 January 2026	Poppy Pritchard	Manchester City	(Scotland) Celtic	Loan	
23 January 2026	(Republic of Ireland) Tara O'Hanlon	Manchester City	(Scotland) Celtic	Loan	
23 January 2026	Lucy Shepherd	(United States) Dallas Trinity	Portsmouth	Free	
23 January 2026	Hannah Silcock	Liverpool	Birmingham City	Loan	
23 January 2026	Libby Smith	(United States) Sporting Club Jacksonville	Nottingham Forest	Undisclosed	
23 January 2026	Katie Zelem	London City Lionesses	West Ham United	Loan	
24 January 2026	(Scotland) Emma Watson	Manchester United	(Mexico) Tigres	Loan	
26 January 2026	Soraya Walsh	West Ham United	Hashtag United	Loan	
27 January 2026	(Iceland) Hlín Eiríksdóttir	Leicester City	(Italy) Fiorentina	Loan	
27 January 2026	(Nigeria) Joy Omewa	(Denmark) Fortuna Hjørring	Nottingham Forest	Undisclosed	
27 January 2026	(Scotland) Kenzie Weir	Everton	Ipswich Town	Loan	
28 January 2026	Kaci-Jai Bonwick	Ipswich Town	AFC Sudbury	Loan	
28 January 2026	Rebekah Dowsett	West Ham United	Nottingham Forest	Loan	
28 January 2026	(Denmark) Tuva Hansen	(Germany) Bayern Munich	West Ham United	Undisclosed	
28 January 2026	Laila Harbert	Arsenal	Everton	Loan	
29 January 2026	Ava Baker	Birmingham City	Ipswich Town	Loan	
29 January 2026	(Republic of Ireland) Leanne Kiernan	Liverpool	Nottingham Forest	Loan	
29 January 2026	(Sweden) Sofia Jakobsson	London City Lionesses	(Mexico) Deportivo Toluca	Free	
29 January 2026	Isabella Sibley	Crystal Palace	(Sweden) Norrköping	Free	
30 January 2026	(Norway) Ylinn Tennebø	(Norway) Vålerenga	West Ham United	Undisclosed	
31 January 2026	Cerys Brown	London City Lionesses	Nottingham Forest	Loan	
31 January 2026	(Wales) Soffia Kelly	Aston Villa	(Scotland) Rangers	Loan	
31 January 2026	Lydia Sallaway	Aston Villa	(Scotland) Glasgow City	Loan	
31 January 2026	Ruby Seaby	Ipswich Town	Lewes	Loan	
1 February 2026	(Republic of Ireland) Dee Bradley	Burnley	Durham	Loan	
2 February 2026	(Australia) Alana Murphy	(Germany) SC Sand	Nottingham Forest	Undisclosed	
2 February 2026	(Hungary) Anna Csiki	Tottenham Hotspur	(Italy) AS Roma	Loan	
2 February 2026	Anouk Denton	West Ham United	(United States) Bay FC	Undisclosed	
2 February 2026	(United States) Olivia Garcia	(Denmark) HB Køge	Brighton & Hove Albion	Undisclosed	
2 February 2026	(United States) Olivia Garcia	Brighton & Hove Albion	(Sweden) AIK	Loan	
2 February 2026	Cecily Wellesley-Smith	Arsenal	(Sweden) Rosengård	Loan	
3 February 2026	Princess Ademiluyi	(United States) Gotham FC	Ipswich Town	Loan	
3 February 2026	(Republic of Ireland) Lily Agg	Birmingham City	Durham	Loan	
3 February 2026	(United States) Simone Charley	(United States) Orlando Pride	Newcastle United	Free	
3 February 2026	(Germany) Rafaela Borggräfe	Liverpool	(Germany) Bayer Leverkusen	Loan	
3 February 2026	(Wales) Mared Griffiths	Manchester United	Sunderland	Loan	
3 February 2026	(Northern Ireland) Caragh Hamilton	Nottingham Forest	Sunderland	Loan	
3 February 2026	(Northern Ireland) Casey Howe	Nottingham Forest	Wolverhampton Wanderers	Loan	
3 February 2026	Olivia Johnson	Brighton & Hove Albion	Nottingham Forest	Loan	
3 February 2026	(Slovenia) Zara Kramžar	(Italy) AS Roma	Everton	Loan	
3 February 2026	Nelly Las	Leicester City	Ipswich Town	Loan	
3 February 2026	(Denmark) Malou Marcetto	(Spain) Madrid CFF	London City Lionesses	Undisclosed	
3 February 2026	Malaika Meena	Bristol City	Ipswich Town	Loan	
3 February 2026	(Canada) Lysianne Proulx	(Italy) Juventus	Ipswich Town	Undisclosed	
3 February 2026	(Czech Republic) Barbora Votíková	(Czech Republic) Slavia Prague	Arsenal	Loan	
3 February 2026	(Poland) Oliwia Woś	(Germany) 1. FC Nürnberg	Bristol City	Undisclosed	
4 February 2026	Keira Barry	Manchester United	(United States) Bay FC	Undisclosed	
4 February 2026	(Northern Ireland) Jackie Burns	(Canada) Calgary Wild	Bristol City	Free	
5 February 2026	Maddy Earl	Arsenal	(Scotland) Glasgow City	Loan	
5 February 2026	(Wales) Charlie Estcourt	(United States) DC Power	Portsmouth	Free	
5 February 2026	Shauna Guyatt	Ipswich Town	Sheffield United	Loan	
5 February 2026	(Republic of Ireland) Lia O'Leary	Bristol City	Sheffield United	Loan	
5 February 2026	Codie Thomas	Manchester City	(Scotland) Glasgow City	Loan	
6 February 2026	Emily Cassap	Sunderland	Middlesbrough	Loan	
6 February 2026	Evie Rabjohn	Manchester United	(Scotland) Celtic	Undisclosed	
6 February 2026	Maddi Wilde	London City Lionesses	(Scotland) Celtic	Loan	
9 February 2026	Vivienne Lia	Arsenal	(Sweden) Hammarby	Loan	
