= 2024 UEFA Women's Under-17 Championship =

U17-Europamästerskapet i fotboll för damer 2024

Tournament details
- Host country: Sweden
- Dates: 5–18 May
- Teams: 8 (from 1 confederation)
- Venue: 2 (in 2 host cities)

Final positions
- Champions: Spain (5th title)
- Runners-up: England
- Third place: Poland
- Fourth place: France

Tournament statistics
- Matches played: 16
- Goals scored: 55 (3.44 per match)
- Attendance: 8,897 (556 per match)
- Top scorer(s): (Spain) Alba Cerrato (7 goals)
- Best player: (Spain) Alba Cerrato

The 2024 UEFA Women's Under-17 Championship was the 15th edition of the UEFA Women's Under-17 Championship, the annual international youth football championship organised by UEFA for the women's under-17 national teams of Europe. Sweden hosted the tournament from 5 to 18 May. The matches were played in Malmö and Lund. Eight matches were played in Malmö IP, Malmö and eight matches were played in Klostergårdens IP, Lund. A total of eight teams played in the tournament, with players born on or after 1 January 2007 eligible to participate.

In the 2023 final, France won their first title by defeating Spain 3–2.

This tournament also acted as UEFA's qualifier for the 2024 FIFA U-17 Women's World Cup in the Dominican Republic, with the winners, runners-up, and third-placed teams qualifying as the UEFA representatives.

== Qualification ==
50 (out of 55) UEFA nations entered the qualifying competition, with the hosts Sweden also competing despite already qualifying automatically, and seven teams qualified for the final tournament at the end of round 2 to join the hosts. The draw for round 1 was held on 31 May 2022, at the UEFA headquarters in Nyon, Switzerland.

=== Qualified teams ===
The following teams qualified for the final tournament.

Team	Method of qualification	Appearance	Last appearance	Previous best performance
Sweden	Hosts	3rd	2023 (Group stage)	Runners-up (2013)
Portugal	Round 2 Group A2 winners	3rd	2019 (Semi-finals)	Semi-finals (2019)
Belgium	Round 2 Group A3 winners	2nd	2013 (Fourth place)	Fourth place (2013)
England	Round 2 Group A6 winners	9th	2023 (Semi-finals)	Third place (2016), Semi-finals (2023)
Norway	Round 2 Group A4 winners	6th	2022 (Group stage)	Fourth place (2009, 2016), Semi-finals (2017)
Poland	Round 2 Group A7 winners	4th	2023 (Group stage)	Champions (2013)
Spain	Round 2 Group A5 winners	13th	2023 (Runners-up)	Champions (2010, 2011, 2015, 2018)
France	Round 2 Group A1 winners	10th	2023 (Champions)	Champions (2023)

== Squads ==
Each national team had to submit a squad of 20 players, two of whom had to be goalkeepers (Regulations Article 44.01).

== Venues ==
The venues for the 2024 UEFA Women's Under-17 Championship were Malmö IP, located in Sweden's third biggest city Malmö and Klostergårdens IP, located in Lund.

2024 UEFA Women's Under-17 Championship is located in Skåne	Malmö	Lund
2024 UEFA Women's Under-17 Championship is located in Skåne	Malmö IP	Klostergårdens IP
2024 UEFA Women's Under-17 Championship is located in Skåne	Capacity: 7,600 (3,900 seated)	Capacity: 3,650 (500 seated)

== Group stage ==
The group winners and runners-up advanced to the semi-finals.

Tiebreakers

In the group stage, teams were ranked according to points (3 points for a win, 1 point for a draw, 0 points for a loss), and if tied on points, the following tiebreaking criteria were applied, in the order given, to determine the rankings (Regulations Articles 20.01 and 20.02):

1. Points in head-to-head matches among tied teams;
2. Goal difference in head-to-head matches among tied teams;
3. Goals scored in head-to-head matches among tied teams;
4. If more than two teams were tied, and after applying all head-to-head criteria above, a subset of teams were still tied, all head-to-head criteria above were reapplied exclusively to that subset of teams;
5. Goal difference in all group matches;
6. Goals scored in all group matches;
7. Penalty shoot-out if only two teams had the same number of points, and they met in the last round of the group and were tied after applying all criteria above (not used if more than two teams had the same number of points, or if their rankings were not relevant for qualification for the next stage);
8. Disciplinary points (red card = 3 points, yellow card = 1 point, expulsion for two yellow cards in one match = 3 points);
9. Higher position in the qualification round 2 league ranking

All times are local, CEST (UTC+2).

=== Group A ===
Pos	Team	Pld	W	D	L	GF	GA	GD	Pts	Qualification
1	England	3	3	0	0	9	1	+8	9	Knockout stage
2	France	3	2	0	1	11	3	+8	6	Knockout stage
3	Norway	3	1	0	2	2	11	−9	3	
4	Sweden (H)	3	0	0	3	3	10	−7	0	

Source: UEFA
Rules for classification: Group stage tiebreakers
(H) Hosts
5 May 2024
13:00

England	3–0	Norway
Parkinson 6'; Harbert 12'; Brown 48'	Report

Klostergårdens IP, Lund
Attendance: 257
Referee: Fabienne Michel (Germany)
5 May 2024
15:30

Sweden	2–3	France
Schröder 78'; Bartholdson 86'	Report	Ebayilin 18'; Rouquet 53'; Adedini 89'

Malmö IP, Malmö
Attendance: 1,279
Referee: Martina Molinaro (Italy)

8 May 2024
15:30

Norway	0–8	France
	Report	Gay 24'; Bironien 26', 35'; Chabod 37'; Adedini 77', 88', 90+2'; Tene 87'

Malmö IP, Malmö
Attendance: 152
Referee: Cansu Tiryaki (Turkey)
8 May 2024
18:30

Sweden	1–5	England
Schröder 6'	Report	Oboavwoduo 5'; Junaid 20'; Fisher 26', 29', 35'

Klostergårdens IP, Lund
Attendance: 2,380
Referee: Michaela Pachtová (Czech Republic)

11 May 2024
15:30

Norway	2–0	Sweden
Broman 42' (o.g.); Ulstein 82'	Report

Malmö IP, Malmö
Attendance: 673
Referee: Lotta Vuorio (Finland)
11 May 2024
15:30

France	0–1	England
	Report	Brown 81'

Klostergårdens IP, Lund
Attendance: 475
Referee: Miriama Bočková (Slovakia)

=== Group B ===
Pos	Team	Pld	W	D	L	GF	GA	GD	Pts	Qualification
1	Spain	3	3	0	0	9	0	+9	9	Knockout stage
2	Poland	3	1	1	1	2	2	0	4	Knockout stage
3	Portugal	3	1	1	1	2	4	−2	4	
4	Belgium	3	0	0	3	0	7	−7	0	

Source: UEFA
Rules for classification: Group stage tiebreakers
6 May 2024
15:30

Poland	1–0	Belgium
Związek 31'	Report

Klostergårdens IP, Lund
Attendance: 207
Referee: Miriama Bočková (Slovakia)
6 May 2024
18:30

Spain	3–0	Portugal
Segura 69'; Cerrato 77', 82' (pen.)	Report

Malmö IP, Malmö
Attendance: 213
Referee: Deborah Anex (Switzerland)

9 May 2024
13:00

Belgium	0–1	Portugal
	Report	Mélanie Florentino 90+3'

Malmö IP, Malmö
Attendance: 206
Referee: Lotta Vuorio (Finland)
9 May 2024
15:30

Spain	1–0	Poland
Gómez 87'	Report

Klostergårdens IP, Lund
Attendance: 341
Referee: Oxana Cruc (Moldova)

12 May 2024
15:30

Belgium	0–5	Spain
	Report	Cerrato 69', 79'; Gómez 84'; Calo 87'; Segura 90+4'

Klostergårdens IP, Lund
Attendance: 316
Referee: Fabienne Michel (Germany)
12 May 2024
15:30

Portugal	1–1	Poland
Joana Valente 49'	Report	Araśniewicz 13'

Malmö IP, Malmö
Attendance: 275
Referee: Michaela Pachtová (Czech Republic)

== Knockout stage ==
In the knockout stage, a penalty shoot-out was used to decide the winner if necessary (no extra time was played).

=== Bracket ===
Semi-finals
15 May - Malmö
England	2
Poland	0
15 May - Lund
Spain	6
France	1

Final
18 May - Malmö
England	0
Spain	4
Third place
18 May - Lund
Poland (p)	2 (4)
France	2 (2)

=== Semi-finals ===
The winners qualified for the 2024 FIFA U-17 Women's World Cup. The losers entered the FIFA U-17 Women's World Cup play-off.

15 May 2024
15:30

Spain	6–1	France
Segura 3'; Gómez 6'; Calo 15', 28'; Cerrato 18', 31'	Report	Abdourahim 59'

Klostergårdens IP, Lund
Attendance: 223
Referee: Cansu Tiryaki (Turkey)

15 May 2024
18:30

England	2–0	Poland
Peacock 29'; Jones 34'	Report

Malmö IP, Malmö
Attendance: 440
Referee: Deborah Anex (Switzerland)

=== Third place play-off ===
The winner qualified for the 2024 FIFA U-17 Women's World Cup.

18 May 2024
13:00

Poland	2–2	France
Związek 10'; Łapińska 80'	Report	Rouquet 11', 40'
Penalties
Łapińska (penalty scored); Witek (penalty scored); Witkowska (penalty scored); Wyrwas (penalty missed); Piekarska (penalty scored)	4–2	(penalty scored) Gay; (penalty missed) Ouazar; (penalty scored) Rouquet; (penalty missed) Chabod

Klostergårdens IP, Lund
Attendance: 367
Referee: Martina Molinaro (Italy)

=== Final ===
18 May 2024
17:00

England	0–4	Spain
	Report	Cerrato 41'; Maltby 45+1' (o.g.); Segura 59', 67'

Malmö IP, Malmö
Attendance: 1,093
Referee: Michaela Pachtová (Czech Republic)

== Goalscorers ==
There were 55 goals scored in 16 matches, for an average of 3.44 goals per match.

7 goals

- (Spain) Alba Cerrato

5 goals

- (Spain) Celia Segura

4 goals

- (France) Rachael Adedini

3 goals

- (England) Isabella Fisher
- (France) Justine Rouquet
- (Spain) Lua Calo
- (Spain) Ainoa Gómez

2 goals

- (England) Lola Brown
- (France) Mymithye Bironien
- (Poland) Oliwia Związek
- (Sweden) Felicia Schröder

1 goal

- (England) Laila Harbert
- (England) Vera Jones
- (England) Omotara Junaid
- (England) Jane Oboavwoduo
- (England) Erica Parkinson
- (England) Niamh Peacock
- (France) Auryane Abdourahim
- (France) Célia Chabod
- (France) Anaïs Ebayilin
- (France) Lina Gay
- (France) Djenna-Léna Tene
- (Norway) Elle Ulstein
- (Poland) Weronika Araśniewicz
- (Poland) Oliwia Łapińska
- (Portugal) Mélanie Florentino
- (Portugal) Joana Valente
- (Sweden) Fabienne Bartholdson

1 own goal

- (England) Rachel Maltby (against Spain)
- (Sweden) Alice Broman (against Norway)

Source: UEFA

== Awards ==
The following awards were given after the tournament:

- Player of the Tournament: (Spain) Alba Cerrato
- Top Scorer(s): (Spain) Alba Cerrato (7 goals)

=== Team of the Tournament ===
After the tournament, the Under-17 Team of the Tournament was selected by the UEFA Technical Observer panel.

Position	Player
Goalkeeper	(Poland) Julia Woźniak
Defenders	(England) Nelly Las
Defenders	(England) Cecily Wellesley-Smith
Defenders	(Spain) Amaya García
Defenders	(Spain) Aiara Agirrezabala
Midfielders	(Poland) Weronika Araśniewicz
Midfielders	(France) Anaïs Ebayilin
Midfielders	(Spain) Ainoa Gómez
Forwards	(Spain) Celia Segura
Forwards	(Spain) Alba Cerrato
Forwards	(England) Lola Brown

== Qualified teams for FIFA U-17 Women's World Cup ==
The following three teams from UEFA qualified for the 2024 FIFA U-17 Women's World Cup in the Dominican Republic.

Team	Qualified on	Previous appearances in FIFA U-17 Women's World Cup^{1}
Spain	15 May 2024	5 (2010, 2014, 2016, **2018**, **2022**)
England	15 May 2024	2 (2008, 2016)
Poland	18 May 2024	0 (debut)

^{1} Bold indicates champions for that year. Italic indicates hosts for that year.
