= Vera Jones (footballer) =

English footballer (born 2008)

Personal information
- Full name: Vera Josephine Jones
- Date of birth: 18 February 2008 (age 18)
- Place of birth: Cardiff, Wales
- Height: 5 ft 4 in (1.62 m)
- Position: Midfielder

Team information
- Current team: Watford (on loan from Chelsea)
- Number: 24

Youth career
- –2024: Barry Town
- 2024–2025: Chelsea

Senior career*
Years	Team	Apps	(Gls)
2025–	Chelsea	0	(0)
2025–2026	→ Bristol City (loan)	18	(0)
2026–	→ Watford (loan)	3	(2)

International career^{‡}
2022	Wales U15		
2023	Wales U17		
2023–2025	England U17	23	(10)
2025–	England U19	6	(2)
2026–	England U20	12	(3)
- * Club domestic league appearances and goals as of 15:58, 28 October 2026 (UTC) ‡ National team caps and goals as of 16:03, 17 September 2026 (UTC)

Vera Josephine Jones (born 18 February 2008) is a professional footballer who plays as a midfielder for Women's Super League 2 club Watford, on loan from Chelsea, and the England under-19 and under-20 national teams. Born and raised in Wales, she currently represents England on the youth international stage.

== Early life ==
Vera Josephine Jones was born on 18 February 2008 in Cardiff, Wales. She attended Radyr Comprehensive School. Jones represented Cardiff & Vale Schools Football Association from the under-11 to under-16 age categories, and won the organisation's Outstanding Contribution Award.

== Youth career ==
Jones began her youth career with the boy's academy of local side Barry Town and played in the team's youth system from the under-12 to under-16 age groups.

In 2024, Jones joined the PGA (Professional Game Academy) of Women's Super League team Chelsea. She travelled to Portugal in January 2025 to join Chelsea's senior team winter training camp.

== Club career ==
=== Chelsea, 2025– ===
On 18 February 2025, Jones, age 17, signed her first professional contract with Chelsea. She spent the remainder of the 2024–25 season with the side, as Chelsea achieved a domestic treble (winning the league, FA Cup, and League Cup).

==== Loan to Bristol City, 2025–26 ====
On 5 August 2025, it was announced that Jones would join Women's Super League 2 (WSL2) club Bristol City on a season-long loan. On 14 September 2025, she made her club debut, assisting Bristol City's second goal against Portsmouth. Jones was nominated for Bristol City Women Player of the Month for September 2025, October 2025, and March 2026. In May 2026, Bristol City confirmed that Jones would return to parent club Chelsea upon the expiration of her loan.

==== New contract with Chelsea, 2026 ====
On 14 August 2026, Jones signed a new three-year contract with Chelsea, extending her stay at the club until at least 2029.

==== Loan to Watford, 2026– ====
On 20 August 2026, Jones joined WSL2 side Watford on a season-long loan. Jones provided an assist in Watford's 1–5 pre-season victory over Wrexham. On 27 September 2026, having returned from the U-20 Women's World Cup, Jones made her competitive debut, and scored her first goal, for Watford as they were defeated 1–2 by Sunderland. For her performance and "fantastic" free-kick goal, Jones was named to the WSL2 Team of the Week. The goal was nominated for Watford's Goal of the Month.

== International career ==
=== Wales ===
In August 2022, Jones was called up to the Wales under-15 team for a UEFA Development Tournament in Belgrade, Serbia. In February 2023, Jones was named to Wales' under-17 team for a mini-tournament in Portugal.

As of May 2023, Jones has represented England on the youth international stage.

=== England ===
On 11 May 2023, Jones was named to England's under-17 team for the 2023 Under-17 Euro; she was an unused substitute during the team's semi-final loss to Spain. In September 2023, Jones was called up to preparation camp ahead of England's 2024 Under-17 Euro qualifiers. On 10 November 2023, she scored a brace in England's 6–0 victory over Belgium.

In October 2024, Jones appeared for England at the 2024 U-17 World Cup, coming on as a substitute in the final where England were once more defeated by Spain.

In February 2025, Jones represented England's under-17 team at the MIMA Cup, scoring a goal in the team's 0–2 victory over Canada. In October 2025, Jones was called up to the under-19 team for a series of 2026 Under-19 Euro qualification matches. In November 2025, Jones was called up to England's under-20 squad for the team's first camp in over seven years, though she later withdrew from the squad.

She was again called up to the under-20 team ahead of friendlies against Spain and the Netherlands in February 2026. Jones made her debut, and scored her first goal, for the side in a 3–1 loss to Spain. In April 2026, Jones was called up to the under-19 team for the final round of 2026 Under-19 Euro qualifiers. Despite a 5–0 victory over Latvia (in which Jones scored and assisted), England failed to qualify for the tournament after losing to Wales and Switzerland. On 9 July 2026, Jones scored her second goal for the under-20 team during a 1–1 draw with the USA. In August 2026, Jones—alongside fellow Chelsea academy graduates Eva Hendle and Lois Shooter—was selected for the England's final preparation squad ahead of the 2026 U-20 World Cup. On 21 August 2026, Jones was officially called up to represent England at the tournament. In England's second group game—a 5–1 win over Tanzania—Jones drew the foul for the second of England's two penalties; both were converted by Rachel Maltby.

== Personal life ==
Jones has a Miniature Schnauzer named Mable.

== Career statistics ==
=== Club ===
As of match played 27 September 2026

Appearances and goals by club, season and competition
Club	Season	League			Cup (Note: Includes the Women's FA Cup)		League Cup (Note: Includes the WSL Cup/Women's League Cup)		Europe (Note: Includes the UEFA Women's Champions League)		Total	
Club	Season	Division	Apps	Goals	Apps	Goals	Apps	Goals	Apps	Goals	Apps	Goals
Chelsea	2024–25	WSL	0	0	0	0	0	0	0	0	0	0
Chelsea	Total		0	0	0	0	0	0	0	0	0	0
Bristol City (loan)	2025–26	WSL2	18	0	2	0	3	0	—		23	0
Bristol City (loan)	Total		18	0	2	0	3	0	0	0	23	0
Watford (loan)	2026–27	WSL2	3	2	0	0	1	0	—		4	2
Watford (loan)	Total		3	2	0	0	1	0	0	0	4	2
Career total			21	2	2	0	4	0	0	0	27	2

== Honours ==
=== Chelsea ===
- FA Women's Super League: 2024–25
- Women's FA Cup: 2024–25
- FA Women's League Cup: 2024–25

=== Individual ===
- Cardiff & Vale Schools Football Association Outstanding Contribution Award
