= Vivienne Lia =

English footballer (born 2006)

Personal information
- Full name: Vivienne Theresa Upendo Lia
- Date of birth: 27 September 2006 (age 20)
- Place of birth: England
- Position: Winger

Team information
- Current team: Eintracht Frankfurt
- Number: 24

Youth career
- Whetstone Wanderers
- Arsenal

Senior career*
| Years | Team | Apps | (Gls) |
| 2025–2026 | Arsenal | 0 | (0) |
| 2025 | → Southampton (loan) | 9 | (0) |
| 2025–2026 | → Nottingham Forest (loan) | 10 | (0) |
| 2026 | → Hammarby (loan) | 7 | (1) |
| 2026– | Eintracht Frankfurt | 1 | (0) |

International career^{‡}
| 2022–2023 | England U17 | 5 | (2) |
| 2024–2025 | England U19 | 18 | (4) |
| 2025– | England U20 | 3 | (1) |
| 2026– | England U23 | 1 | (0) |
- * Club domestic league appearances and goals as of 8 October 2026 ‡ National team caps and goals as of 16 April 2026

Vivienne Theresa Upendo Lia (born 27 September 2006) is an English professional footballer who plays as a winger for Eintracht Frankfurt and the England under-20s.

== Early life ==
Lia grew up in North London, as the youngest of five siblings, and is a life-long Arsenal fan. Her mother was born in Tanzania. Lia joined Whetstone Wanderers at the age of 10, followed by the Arsenal Women's Academy at the age of 14. Lia made 4 appearances for the academy team in the 2023–24 season, scoring one goal.

== Club career ==
=== Arsenal ===
Lia made her senior debut for Arsenal at the age of 17 on 14 February 2024 against London City Lionesses in the quarter-finals of the Women's League Cup, replacing Katie McCabe in the 82nd minute. She then made her second appearance for the Gunners in their League Cup semi-final, a 4–0 win over Aston Villa, coming on in the 90th minute to replace Frida Maanum.

Lia started for the Gunners in their 2024 post-season 1–0 win against A-League All-Stars Women, providing the assist for the only goal of the game, scored by fellow striker Alessia Russo. Later in the summer, Lia started in Arsenal's first pre-season match against Washington Spirit, before being replaced by Steph Catley in the 78th minute.

Lia signed her first professional contract with Arsenal on 14 January 2025.

==== Southampton F.C. (loan) ====
On 18 January 2025, Women's Championship side Southampton F.C. announced that Lia had signed on loan for the remainder of the 2024–25 season, where she went on to make 9 appearances across all competitions for the club.

==== Nottingham Forest (loan) ====
On 3 September 2025, Arsenal announced that Lia would spend the 2025–26 season on loan at Nottingham Forest. Lia made her debut for the Garibaldi Reds off the bench in the 68th minute of Nottingham's opening game of the 2025–26 season, a 1–2 loss against Newcastle United. Lia was recalled from her loan to Nottingham Forest on the final day of the 2026 winter transfer window, having made 12 appearances for Forest across all competitions.

==== Hammarby (loan) ====
On 9 February 2026, joined Swedish club Hammarby in the Damallsvenskan for the remainder of the 2025–26 WSL season, and the beginning of the 2026 season.

Lia made her debut for Hammarby in 4–0 win against FC Rosengård in the Svenska Cupen, later winning that tournament in a 1–0 extra time win against BK Häcken, where Lia was subbed on in the 68th minute. She then made her Damallsvenskan debut against the same, in a 3–1 win where she picked up her first goal for the Swedish side. Lia was recalled from her loan to Hammarby on 7 July 2026.

=== Eintracht Frankfurt ===
On 21 August 2026, Lia joined Frauen-Bundesliga side Eintracht Frankfurt on a permanent deal, signing a four-year deal. Lia made her debut for Frankfurt as a substitute in their 5 - 1 loss to Paris-Saint Germain in the UEFA Women's Champions League Qualifications, coming on for Erëleta Memeti in the 117th minute of the game.

Lia scored her first goal for the club in a 1 - 6 win against Karlsruhe in the DFB-Pokal.

== International career ==
Lia has represented the England under-17, under-19, under-20 and under-23 national teams.

Lia received her first under-17 call-up in October 2022 for the 2023 UEFA Women's Under-17 Championship qualification rounds, which saw England play Ukraine, hosts Estonia, and Denmark. She scored her first goal at Under-17 level in a 10 - 0 win against Ukraine. Lia was then named in the squad for the second qualifying round, which saw England claim their place at the 2023 UEFA Women's Under-17 Championship Finals but did not make the Finals squad.

Over a year after her last England call-up, Lia received her first Under-19 call-up in April 2024. Named by head coach John Griffiths for the second round of the 2024 Under-19 Euro qualification, she helped the youth team qualify for the final competition. Lia featured in the tournament squad; England were knocked out in the semi-finals by Spain.

Lia was selected for both round one and round two of qualifying for the 2025 Under-19 Euro, scoring three goals in the second round to help England qualify for the Finals tournament. In February 2025, she was again called up to the under-19 squad, alongside Saints teammates Araya Dennis and Laila Harbert, for the Albir Garden Tournament. In June 2025, new manager Lauren Smith announced her squad for the finals of the 2025 European Under-19 Championship in Poland, with Lia's name down as one of 6 young Arsenal players.

Named as an injury replacement for Lauren Smith's England under-20 squad, Lia made her debut for the under-20s in a 2–1 win against China PR. She then scored her first goal for the Young Lionesses just 6 days later in a 2–3 win over Mexico.

Lia was named as a replacement in Lydia Bedford's first England under-23 squad, replacing Keira Barry who was called up to the senior team. Lia made her debut for the under-23 side in the final minute of the Young Lionesses' 1-0 semi-final win over the Netherlands.

In September 2026, Lia was called into England's under-20 squad for the 2026 U-20 World Cup as a replacement for the withdrawn Erica Meg Parkinson.

== Style of play ==
A speedy and skillful winger, Lia can also play at right-back when required. She describes herself as "quite direct and creative".

== Personal life ==
Lia is a dual-national of the United Kingdom and Tanzania (the country of her mother's birth).

== Career statistics ==
=== Club ===
As of 28 October 2026

Appearances and goals by club, season and competition
| Club | Season | League | | | National cup (Note: Includes Women's FA Cup, Svenska Cupen, DFB-Pokal Frauen) | | League cup (Note: Includes Women's League Cup) | | Continental | | Total | |
| Club | Season | Division | Apps | Goals | Apps | Goals | Apps | Goals | Apps | Goals | Apps | Goals |
|---|---|---|---|---|---|---|---|---|---|---|---|---|
| Arsenal | 2023–24 | Women's Super League | 0 | 0 | 0 | 0 | 2 | 0 | — | | 2 | 0 |
| Arsenal | Total | | 0 | 0 | 0 | 0 | 2 | 0 | — | | 2 | 0 |
| Southampton (loan) | 2024–25 | Women's Championship | 9 | 0 | 0 | 0 | — | | — | | 9 | 0 |
| Southampton (loan) | Total | | 9 | 0 | 0 | 0 | 0 | 0 | — | | 9 | 0 |
| Nottingham Forest (loan) | 2025–26 | Women's Super League 2 | 10 | 0 | 1 | 0 | 1 | 0 | — | | 12 | 0 |
| Nottingham Forest (loan) | Total | | 10 | 0 | 1 | 0 | 1 | 0 | — | | 12 | 0 |
| Hammarby IF (loan) | 2026 | Damallsvenskan | 2 | 1 | 4 | 0 | 0 | 0 | — | | 6 | 1 |
| Hammarby IF (loan) | Total | | 2 | 1 | 4 | 0 | 0 | 0 | — | | 6 | 1 |
| Eintracht Frankfurt | 2026–27 | Frauen-Bundesliga | 1 | 0 | 1 | 0 | — | | 3 | 0 (Note: One appearances in UEFA Women's Champions League qualifying rounds and two appearances in the UEFA Women's Europa Cup) | 5 | 0 |
| Career total | | | 22 | 1 | 6 | 0 | 5 | 0 | 0 | 0 | 33 | 0 |
