= Cecily Wellesley-Smith =

English footballer (born 2007)

Personal information
- Full name: Cecily Margaret Wellesley-Smith
- Date of birth: 4 January 2007 (age 19)
- Height: 1.83 m (6 ft 0 in)
- Position: Centre-back

Team information
- Current team: FC Rosengård (on loan from Arsenal)
- Number: 15

Youth career
- 2016–2023: Oxford United

Senior career*
Years	Team	Apps	(Gls)
2023–2025	Oxford United	16	(0)
2025–	Arsenal	0	(0)
2025	→ Leicester City (loan)	0	(0)
2026–	→ FC Rosengård (loan)	14	(2)

International career^{‡}
- England U16
2024	England U17	17	(0)
2025–	England U19	9	(0)
2025–	England U20	3	(0)
- * Club domestic league appearances and goals as of 14:59, 24 July 2026 (UTC) ‡ National team caps and goals as of 13:51, 2 August 2026 (UTC)

Cecily Margaret Wellesley-Smith (born 4 January 2007) is an English professional footballer who plays as a centre-back for Swedish Damallsvenskan club FC Rosengård, on loan from Women's Super League club Arsenal.

== Club career ==
=== Oxford United ===
At the age of 9, Wellesley-Smith joined Oxford United. She progressed through the ranks of the club, eventually joining the first team at age 16 during the 2023–24 season. In her first season of senior football, she became a regular in the Oxford United starting lineup. The following year, she made 16 competitive appearances for the club.

=== Arsenal ===
Wellesley-Smith also spent much of the 2024–25 campaign with Arsenal, who signed her to a dual-registration agreement that also allowed her to compete for the Arsenal Women's Academy Under-21 side. She went on to become a prominent contributor in the Arsenal Under-21 squad's PGA League Division One title. On 24 June 2025, Arsenal announced that they had signed Wellesley-Smith to her first professional contract.

==== Leicester City (loan) ====
In September 2025, the club sent her on a loan spell through the 2025–26 season to fellow Women's Super League club Leicester City. It marked Wellesley-Smith's first time living away from home. Later that month, Wellesley-Smith made her Leicester City debut, participating in a 5–1 Women's League Cup victory over Ipswich Town. She would go on to struggle to earn playing time with Leicester, failing to earn any further appearances following her debut. In January 2026, Wellesley-Smith was recalled to Arsenal after only completing half of the original loan agreement.

==== FC Rosengård (loan) ====
On 2 February 2026, Wellesley-Smith was announced to have joined Swedish Damallsvenskan club FC Rosengård through the end of the 2026 Damallsvenskan. She made her club debut twelve days later, earning the starting nod in a Svenska Cupen match against Vittsjö GIK to kick off Rosengård's season. On 17 March 2026, she scored her first Rosengård goal, heading in the final goal in a 3–0 victory over Växjö DFF to close out Rosengård's Svenska Cupen campaign with a win.

== International career ==
Wellesley-Smith has represented England at multiple youth international levels. In November 2022, she captained the under-16 team in a friendly match against Wales. In 2024, she was a member of the under-17 squad that finished the 2024 UEFA Women's Under-17 Championship as runners-up after losing to Spain in the final. She was named to the Team of the Tournament alongside England teammates Lola Brown and Nelly Las. Later the same year, Wellesley-Smith helped the under-17s to a fourth-place finish in the 2024 FIFA U-17 Women's World Cup. Wellesley-Smith has also been capped at the under-19 and under-20 levels.
