= Lucy Newell (footballer) =

English footballer (born 2006)

Personal information
- Full name: Lucy May Newell
- Date of birth: 2 October 2006 (age 20)
- Place of birth: Shrewsbury, England
- Position: Defender

Team information
- Current team: Manchester United
- Number: 55

Youth career
- 2015–2022: West Bromwich Albion
- 2023–2024: Manchester United

Senior career*
| Years | Team | Apps | (Gls) |
| 2022–2024 | West Bromwich Albion | 26 | (1) |
| 2024– | Manchester United | 0 | (0) |
| 2025 | → Blackburn Rovers (loan) | 9 | (1) |
| 2025 | → Birmingham City (loan) | 2 | (0) |
| 2026 | → Crystal Palace (loan) | 3 | (0) |

International career^{‡}
| 2022 | England U16 | | |
| 2023 | England U17 | 6 | (0) |
| 2023–2025 | England U19 | 25 | (0) |
| 2025– | England U20 | 0 | (0) |
- * Club domestic league appearances and goals as of 20 September 2026 ‡ National team caps and goals as of 19 November 2025

Lucy May Newell (born 2 October 2006) is an English professional footballer who plays as a defender for Women's Super League club Manchester United. She has previously played on loan for WSL 2 sides Birmingham City, Blackburn Rovers, and Crystal Palace after having begun her senior career at National League North club West Bromwich Albion.

== Youth career ==
Newell joined West Bromwich Albion aged nine. Aged 11, she captained the Shrewsbury junior school girls team to fifth place in a national cup competition for primary schools in England, having won all seven games without conceding a goal in the regional tournament.

As a track runner for Shrewsbury Athletic Club, she broke the club record for 1500 meters in under-13s competition and receiving an award from the chairman.

== Club career ==
Newell signed to the Manchester United Academy in 2023. She remained on dual registration with United while playing in the National League North for West Bromwich Albion in the 2023–24 season. On 26 February 2023, Newell scored her debut senior goal in a 3–1 victory over Liverpool Feds. At the end of the season, Newell was awarded the Women’s Academy Players’ Player of the Year by Manchester United. She made a total of 36 appearances over the course of two seasons for West Brom.

In October 2024, she signed her first professional contract with Women's Super League club Manchester United on her 18th birthday. With lack of playing time at United, in January 2025 Newell joined Blackburn Rovers on loan for the remainder of the 2024–25 season where she made 10 appearances. On 16 February, she headed in her only goal for Rovers in a 3–2 defeat to Durham. At the end of the season, she was shortlisted for the Women’s Championship Rising Star award.

On 21 August 2025, Newell joined Women's Super League 2 club Birmingham City on loan for the 2025–26 season. On 14 January 2026 she was recalled to Manchester United having made four appearances for City. On 23 January 2026, Crystal Palace announced that Newell was joining them on loan for the remainder of the 2025–26 season.

== International career ==
Newell has represented and captained England at international youth level.

In May 2023, she featured in the England under-17 squad for the 2023 UEFA U17 Championship, coming on as 63rd minute sub in a 2–1 win over Poland, and started in the 1–1 draw match with France. England were then knocked out in the semi-final by Spain in a 3–1 defeat. The following year, representing the England under-19s, she played in the 2024 UEFA U19 Championship with the youth team again being knocked out by Spain, in a semi-final defeat with the same scoreline.

In the 2025 UEFA U19 Championship in June, she played all 90 minutes in the three group stage matches as a centre-back, with England qualifying for the 2026 FIFA U-20 Women's World Cup.

== Personal life ==
In August 2018, aged 11, Newell held a cake sale raising funds for the charity Age UK.
