= Lauren Smith (football manager) =

Welsh football manager (born 1991)

Personal information
- Full name: Lauren Anne Smith
- Date of birth: 29 April 1988 (age 38)
- Place of birth: Wales

Team information
- Current team: England WU20 (manager)

Managerial career
- Years: Team
- 2015–2017: Bristol City Women (assistant)
- 2018–2019: Wales WU19
- 2019–2021: Wales WU17
- 2021: Tottenham Hotspur Women (assistant)
- 2021–2024: Bristol City Women
- 2024–2026: England WU19
- 2026: England WU23 (interim)
- 2026–: England WU20

Lauren Anna Smith (born 29 April 1988) is a Welsh professional football manager who is the head coach of the England women's national under-20 team. She previously managed the England women's national under-19 team, Bristol City Women, the Wales women's national team at under-17 and under-19 youth level.

== Career ==
In 2010, Smith joined Bristol City as an Under-14 coach. In 2014, she became a full-time employee becoming the club's 9-19 technical director and First Team assistant coach. Smith also oversaw the Development Squad and SGS College female women's football side.

In 2018, she left Bristol and became assistant coach to the Wales women's under-19s, followed by the under-17s in 2019. In January 2021, Smith joined Tottenham Hotspur as an assistant coach.

In June 2021, Smith rejoined Bristol City as head coach of the senior Women's team. In the 2022–23 Women's Championship season, Smith led Bristol City to win the league and be promoted back to the Women's Super League, the top tier of English women's football. She was named the Championship Manager of the Season for 2022–23.

In September 2024, Smith was appointed as the manager of the England women's national under-19 football team.

In January 2026, Smith was named as the interim head coach of the England women's national under-23 team for the first international set of fixtures of the year, as well as manager of the under-20s for the 2026 FIFA U-20 Women's World Cup in September. In March, she was subsequently replaced from her interim role with the under-23s by Lydia Bedford.

== Managerial statistics ==
As of 18 May 2024 (Including cup games)

| Team | Nat | From | To | Record | | | | |
| Team | Nat | From | To | G | W | D | L | Win % |
|---|---|---|---|---|---|---|---|---|
| Bristol City W.F.C. | (England) | 18 June 2021 | 27 August 2024 | 83 | 34 | 13 | 36 | 40.9 |
| Total | | | | 83 | 33 | 13 | 35 | 40.9 |
