= Layla Drury =

English footballer (born 2009)

Personal information
- Full name: Layla Marie Drury
- Date of birth: 12 June 2009 (age 17)
- Place of birth: Wrexham, Wales
- Height: 1.85 m (6 ft 1 in)
- Position: Forward

Team information
- Current team: Manchester United
- Number: 27

Youth career
- FAW North Academy
- 2024–: Manchester United

Senior career*
Years	Team	Apps	(Gls)
2025–	Manchester United	6	(0)

International career^{‡}
2023–2024	Wales U15		
2024–2025	Wales U17	11	(4)
2026–	England U20	2	(0)
2026–	England U19	2	(1)
- * Club domestic league appearances and goals as of 19:10, 22 November 2026 (UTC) ‡ National team caps and goals as of 13:28, 2 August 2026 (UTC)

Layla Marie Drury (born 12 June 2009) is a professional footballer who plays as a forward for Women's Super League club Manchester United. Born in Wales, she plays for the England under-20 national team.

In January 2026, she became the youngest player and goalscorer in Manchester United's history, surpassing records previously held by Lauren James.

== Early life ==
Drury was born in Wrexham, Wales.

== Youth career ==
Drury joined the Manchester United academy in November 2024. After just over a year of training with the under-16 and under-21 squads, she was promoted to the senior team by head coach Marc Skinner in December 2025.

== Club career ==
=== Manchester United, 2025– ===
Drury made her senior professional debut in a Women's FA Cup fourth round match against Burnley on 18 January 2026. Entering as a 66th-minute substitute, she scored the final goal in a 5–0 victory. At 16 years and 220 days old, she became the youngest player to represent Manchester United Women and the club's youngest-ever goalscorer across all senior competitive formats. She made her Women's Super League debut on 25 January 2026, in a 4–1 win against Aston Villa.

On 3 July 2026, Manchester United announced that Drury had signed her first professional contract with the side, keeping the forward at the club until 2029.

== International career ==
Drury is a dual-national, eligible to represent both Wales and England. She began her international career with Wales and represented them up to under-17 level. She joined the Wales under-19 squad as a training player in October 2025.

On 18 February 2026, Drury was called up to the England under-20 squad for a series of international friendlies in Spain. On 19 February 2026, her request to switch allegiance to England was approved by FIFA. She made her debut on 28 February 2026 as a substitute in an international friendly against Spain in Alicante, and later made her first start in a win against the Netherlands. In April 2026, she was called up to England's under-19 squad for 2026 Under-19 Euro qualification matches.

== Style of play ==
The tallest player in Manchester United Women's squad, head coach Marc Skinner has highlighted Drury's "speed of thought", "speed of movement" and "the way she invades [space]".

== Career statistics ==
=== Club ===
As of match played 22 November 2026

Appearances and goals by club, season and competition
Club	Season	League			FA Cup		League Cup		Europe		Total	
Club	Season	Division	Apps	Goals	Apps	Goals	Apps	Goals	Apps	Goals	Apps	Goals
Manchester United	2025–26	WSL	5	0	2	1	0	0	0	0	7	1
Manchester United	2026–27	WSL	1	0	0	0	1	0	—		2	0
Career total			6	0	2	1	1	0	0	0	9	1

== Honours ==
=== Records ===
- Youngest first-team player to appear for Manchester United:16 years, 220 days (against Burnley, FA Cup, 18 January 2026)
- Youngest first-team player to scorer a goal for Manchester United: 16 years, 220 days (against Burnley, FA Cup, 18 January 2026)
