= England women's national under-20 football team =

England Women's U-20s
- Nickname: The Young Lionesses
- Association: The Football Association
- Confederation: UEFA (Europe)
- FIFA code: ENG
First colours	Second colours

FIFA U-20 Women's World Cup
- Appearances: 6 (first in 2002)
- Best result: Third place (2018)

The England women's national under-20 football team is an association football team that represents England women at under-20 level. It has been governed by the Football Association (FA) since 1993, having been previously administered by the Women's Football Association (WFA). Although most national football teams represent a sovereign state, as a member of the United Kingdom's Home Nations, England is permitted by FIFA statutes to maintain its own national side that competes in all major tournaments. The team operated as England Under-21s from 2018 to 2021, followed by England Under-23s, after cancellations of the Under-19 Championship and U-20 World Cup.

== Pathway Transitions ==
=== Move to U-21 system (2018–2021) ===
In a bid to better aid the transition between the youth pathway and senior football, the WFA announced in September 2018 that they were scrapping the U23s and U20s format in order to form an Under-21s age group, which would become the top tier of the nation's professional development phase. The move would align England's structure to that used in other European countries, allowing for more age-appropriate games and better manage individual player development post-U20 World Cup for those who have genuine senior team potential. The then U20s manager Mo Marley was announced as head coach.

=== Move to U-23 team (2021–present) ===
In October 2021, the FA announced the return of an under-23 team as newly appointed senior manager Sarina Wiegman looked to increase international playing opportunities for promising players in the senior pathway, particularly those who had aged out of the under-21 squad. Mo Marley was appointed head coach and tasked with also mentoring Emma Coates and Fara Williams as coaches. The move came off the back of the cancellation of two editions of the UEFA Women's Under-19 Championship and one FIFA U-20 Women's World Cup as a result of the COVID-19 pandemic, further limiting opportunities for youth international experience.

== Under-20 World Cups ==
=== 2018 Under-20 World Cup ===
In 2018 they finished third at the 2018 FIFA U-20 Women's World Cup, their best ever finish at the tournament. They won the play-off for third 4–2 on penalties against the host nation France. In the knockout rounds, they overcame tournament debutants the Netherlands 2–1 in the quarter-finals before losing 2–0 to Japan, which was the first time England they had reached the semi-final stage.

=== 2026 Under-20 World Cup ===
England Women's Under-19s confirmed England's qualification for the 2026 Under-20 World Cup in June 2025, despite finishing 3rd in their group at the 2025 Under-19 European Championship.

A group of Under-19 and Under-20 players were announced for the first Under-20 training camp in over 7 years on 19 November 2025, with games against China PR, USA and Mexico to be played in Murcia, Spain. England Women's Under-19s Head Coach Lauren Smith took control of the Under-20s as they beat Mexico and China, and lost to a strong USA Under-20 side.

== Competitive record ==
=== FIFA Under-20 Women's World Cup ===
FIFA U-19 Women's World Cup record
Year	Round	Position	Pld	W	D	L	GF	GA
(Canada) 2002	Quarter-finals	6th	4	1	1	2	7	11
(Thailand) 2004	Did not qualify							
FIFA U-20 Women's World Cup record
Year	Round	Position	Pld	W	D	L	GF	GA
(Russia) 2006	Did not qualify							
(Chile) 2008	Quarter-finals	8th	4	1	2	1	4	5
(Germany) 2010	Group stage	13th	3	0	1	2	2	5
(Japan) 2012	Did not qualify							
(Canada) 2014	Group stage	11th	3	0	2	1	3	4
(Papua New Guinea) 2016	Did not qualify							
(France) 2018	Third place	3rd	6	3	2	1	13	7
(Costa Rica) 2022	Did not qualify							
(Colombia) 2024	Did not qualify							
(Poland) 2026	Round of 16	TBD	4	1	1	2	7	7
Total:6/12	Third place	3rd	24	6	9	9	36	39

== Head-to-head record ==
The following table shows England's head-to-head record in the FIFA U-20 Women's World Cup.

Opponent	Pld	W	D	L	GF	GA	GD	Win %
Australia	1	0	1	0	0	0	+0	0.00
Brazil	2	0	1	1	2	3	−1	0.00
Canada	2	0	1	1	3	7	−4	0.00
Chinese Taipei	1	1	0	0	4	0	+4	100.00
Chile	1	1	0	0	2	0	+2	100.00
France	1	0	1	0	1	1	+0	0.00
Japan	2	0	0	2	1	5	−4	0.00
Mexico	3	1	1	1	7	3	+4	33.33
Netherlands	1	1	0	0	2	1	+1	100.00
New Zealand	1	0	1	0	1	1	+0	0.00
Nigeria	4	0	2	2	3	7	−4	0.00
North Korea	1	1	0	0	3	1	+2	100.00
Tanzania	1	1	0	0	5	1	+4	100.00
South Korea	1	0	1	0	1	1	+0	0.00
United States	2	0	0	2	1	8	−7	0.00
Total	24	6	9	9	36	39	−3	25.00

== Current squad ==
On 21 August 2026, head coach Lydia Bedford named a 21-player squad for the 2026 U-20 Women's World Cup. Jess Anderson and Layla Drury joined the squad as training players for the final preparation camp and match against New Caledonia.

On 30 August 2026, it was announced that Lauryn Thompson had withdrawn from the tournament squad due to injury; she was replaced by Drury.

On 4 September 2026, Vivienne Lia was called into the squad to replace Erica Meg Parkinson.

No.	Pos.	Player	Date of birth (age)	Club
21	GK	Eve Annets	19 March 2006 (age 20)	(The Football Association) Hibernian (on loan from Manchester City)
1	GK	Katie Cox	28 April 2006 (age 20)	(The Football Association) Nottingham Forest (on loan from Chelsea)
13	GK	Kaiya Jota	5 February 2006 (age 20)	(United States Soccer Federation) Stanford Cardinal
2	DF	Ria Bose	7 February 2006 (age 20)	(The Football Association) West Ham United
20	DF	Sacha Lewis	28 February 2008 (age 18)	(The Football Association) Manchester City
12	DF	Rachel Maltby	25 March 2007 (age 19)	(The Football Association) Aston Villa
15	DF	Lucy Newell	2 October 2006 (age 20)	(The Football Association) Manchester United
3	DF	Chloe Sarwie	19 December 2008 (age 17)	(The Football Association) Chelsea
5	DF	Zara Shaw	6 June 2007 (age 19)	(The Football Association) Liverpool
6	DF	Cecily Wellesley-Smith	4 January 2007 (age 19)	(Swedish Football Association) FC Rosengård (on loan from Arsenal)
10	MF	Lola Brown	31 October 2007 (age 19)	(The Football Association) Chelsea
4	MF	May Cruft	6 September 2009 (age 17)	(Scottish Football Association) Rangers
14	MF	Chloe Hylton	25 April 2007 (age 19)	(United States Soccer Federation) Carolina Ascent
11	MF	Vera Jones	18 February 2008 (age 18)	(The Football Association) Watford (on loan from Chelsea)
9	FW	Princess Ademiluyi	14 July 2006 (age 20)	(The Football Association) Ipswich Town (on loan from Gotham)
	FW	Jess Anderson TP	20 March 2008 (age 18)	(The Football Association) Manchester United
18	FW	Lily Dent	5 September 2006 (age 20)	(The Football Association) Sunderland (on loan from Brighton & Hove Albion)
	FW	Layla Drury	12 June 2009 (age 17)	(The Football Association) Manchester United
19	FW	Jessie Gale	23 August 2006 (age 20)	(The Football Association) Newcastle (on loan from Arsenal)
16	FW	Eva Hendle	30 April 2008 (age 18)	(Scottish Football Association) Rangers (on loan from Chelsea)
7	FW	Eleanor Klinger	4 November 2006 (age 20)	(United States Soccer Federation) Stanford Cardinal
	FW	Vivienne Lia	27 September 2006 (age 20)	(The Football Association) Arsenal
TP = Training player

=== Recent call-ups ===
The following players have also been called up to the England under-20 squad within the last twelve months.

Pos.	Player	Date of birth (age)	Caps	Goals	Club	Latest call-up
GK	Sophia Poor	25 June 2006 (age 20)	-	-	(England) London City Lionesses	v. Portugal, 13 August 2026
GK	Sophie Jackson	18 October 2008 (age 18)	-	-	(England) Tottenham Hotspur	v. Mexico, 6 March 2026
GK	Lily Clark	13 September 2008 (age 18)	-	-	(England) Aston Villa	
DF	Sophie Harwood	25 June 2007 (age 19)	-	-	(England) Arsenal	v. Portugal, 13 August 2026
DF	Grace McEwen	25 August 2007 (age 19)	-	-	(England) Brighton & Hove Albion	v. Portugal, 13 August 2026
DF	Chloe Paxton	26 September 2006 (age 20)	-	-	(England) Sunderland	v. Portugal, 13 August 2026
DF	Nelly Las	17 December 2007 (age 18)	-	-	(England) Ipswich Town (loan)	v. Mexico, 6 March 2026
DF	Niamh Peacock	22 March 2008 (age 18)	-	-	(England) Arsenal	v. Mexico, 6 March 2026
DF	Damilola Atinaro	28 November 2006 (age 19)	-	-	(England) Brighton & Hove Albion	v. China, 26 November 2025
DF	Jessica Pegram	14 April 2007 (age 19)	-	-	(Scotland) Rangers (loan)	v. China, 26 November 2025
MF	Erica Meg Parkinson WD	18 April 2008 (age 18)	-	-	(United States) North Carolina Courage	v. New Caledonia, 29 August 2026
MF	Laila Harbert	3 January 2007 (age 19)	-	-	(England) Arsenal	v. Colombia, 15 July 2026
MF	Lexi Potter	17 August 2006 (age 20)	-	-	(England) Chelsea	v. Colombia, 15 July 2026
MF	Sienna Wareing	18 December 2007 (age 18)	-	-	(England) West Ham United	v. Colombia, 15 July 2026
MF	Omotara Junaid	4 October 2007 (age 19)	-	-	(United States) Florida State Seminoles	v. Mexico, 6 March 2026
MF	Taylor Warren	30 November 2008 (age 17)	-	-	(England) Brighton & Hove Albion	v. China, 26 November 2025
FW	Lauryn Thompson WD	4 November 2007 (age 19)	-	-	(United States) North Carolina Courage	v. New Caledonia, 29 August 2026
FW	Ava Baker	9 January 2006 (age 20)	-	-	(England) Ipswich Town (loan)	v. Portugal, 13 August 2026
FW	Lois Shooter	6 January 2008 (age 18)	-	-	(England) Nottingham Forest (loan)	v. Portugal, 13 August 2026
FW	Denny Draper	17 March 2007 (age 19)	-	-	(England) Leicester City	v. Colombia, 15 July 2026
FW	Lily Murphy	13 February 2006 (age 20)	-	-	(England) Manchester City	v. Mexico, 6 March 2026
FW	Jane Oboavwoduo	29 December 2009 (age 16)	-	-	(England) Manchester City	v. China, 26 November 2025
WD = Withdrew; INJ = Withdrew due to injury; U23 = Called up to U23 squad

== Results and fixtures ==
The following is a list of match results in the last 12 months, as well as any future matches that have been scheduled.

Win Draw Loss Fixture

=== 2025 ===
26 November 2025 Friendly	Chile	1–2	England	Murcia, Spain
	Jiaxuan 58'	Report	Shooter 17'; Baker 91' (pen.)	Stadium: Pinatar Arena

29 November 2025 Friendly	England	1–4	United States	Murcia, Spain
	Gale 93'	Report	Long; Pfeiffer	Stadium: Pinatar Arena

2 December 2025 Friendly	Mexico	2–3	England	Murcia, Spain
	Valadez 5'; Fragoso Garcia 51'	Report	Lia 6'; Cruft 29'; Baker 49'	Stadium: Pinatar Arena

=== 2026 ===
28 February 2026 Friendly	Spain	3–1	England	Alicante, Spain
11:00 GMT (UTC+0)		Report	Jones 63'	Stadium: Friendly

3 March 2026 Friendly	England	1–0	Netherlands	Alicante, Spain
15:00 GMT (UTC+0)	Hylton 43'	Report		Stadium: Albir Garden Stadium

6 March 2026 Friendly	England	4–1	Mexico	Alicante, Spain
11:00 GMT (UTC+0)	Harbert 44', 66'; Shooter 57'; Ademiluyi 90+5'	Report	Ibarra 90'	Stadium: Albir Garden Stadium

3 June 2026 Friendly	England	1–0	Canada	Murcia, Spain
17:00 BST (UTC+1)	Harbert 90'	Report		Stadium: Pinatar Arena

9 June 2026 Friendly	England	0–1	Japan	Murcia, Spain
11:00 BST (UTC+1)		Report	Ota 88'	Stadium: Pinatar Arena

9 July 2026 Friendly	United States	1–1	England	Fayetteville, Georgia, USA
23:00 BST (UTC+1)	Johnson 40'	Report	Jones 32'	Stadium: Arthur M. Blank U.S. Soccer National Training Center

15 July 2026 Friendly	England	0–0 (5–4 p)	Colombia	Fayetteville, Georgia, USA
17:00 BST (UTC+1)		Report		Stadium: Arthur M. Blank U.S. Soccer National Training Center
	Penalties
	Habert (penalty scored); Potter (penalty scored); Maltby (penalty scored); Gale (penalty scored); Hendle (penalty scored)		Penalty missed Penalty scored

13 August 2026 Friendly	Portugal	0–2	England	Lisbon, Portugal
17:00 BST (UTC+1)		Report	Baker 40'; Drury 94'	Stadium: Cidade do Futebol

29 August 2026 Friendly	England	11–0	New Caledonia	Burton upon Trent, England
	Dent 12'; Gale 14'; Newell 51', 54'; Anderson 62'; Jones 64'; Ademiluyi 80', 81', 89', 91'; Drury 94'	Report		Stadium: St. Georges Park

5 September 2026 FIFA U-20 Women's World Cup Group B	Canada	1–1	England	Bielsko-Biała, Poland
17:00 BST (UTC+1)	Chukwu 52'	Report	Maltby 89' (pen.)	Stadium: Bielsko-Biała Stadium; Attendance: 637; Referee: Anahi Fernandez

8 September 2026 FIFA U-20 Women's World Cup Group B	England	5–1	Tanzania	Bielsko-Biała, Poland
17:00 BST (UTC+1)	Ademiluyi 9'; Maltby 14' (pen.), 43' (pen.), 45+5'; Gale 74'	Report	Mnunduka 65'	Stadium: Bielsko-Biała Stadium; Attendance: 627; Referee: Dione Rissios (Chile)

11 September 2026 FIFA U-20 Women's World Cup Group B	England	1–2	Brazil	Bielsko-Biała, Poland
14:00 BST (UTC+1)	Dent 31'	Report	Clarinha 76' (pen.); Gisele 90+5'	Stadium: Bielsko-Biała Stadium; Attendance: 1,005; Referee: Alyssa Pennington (United States)

17 September 2026 FIFA U-20 Women's World Cup Round of 16	England	0–3	Nigeria	Bielsko-Biała, Poland
14:00 BST (UTC+1)		Report	Rafiu 8'; Akekoromowei 47'; Mamadu 73'	Stadium: Bielsko-Biała Stadium; Attendance: 615; Referee: Myriam Marcotte (Canada)
