= Lola Brown =

English footballer (born 2007)

Personal information
- Full name: Lola Sangita Brown
- Date of birth: 31 October 2007 (age 19)
- Place of birth: Sliema, Malta
- Height: 1.61 m (5 ft 3 in)
- Position: Midfielder

Team information
- Current team: Chelsea
- Number: 25

Youth career
- 2015–2019: All Stars Soccer Academy
- 2019–2024: Chelsea

Senior career*
Years	Team	Apps	(Gls)
2024–	Chelsea	2	(0)
2025–2026	→ Crystal Palace (loan)	10	(0)

International career^{‡}
2022–2024	England U17	28	(6)
2024–	England U19	9	(4)
2026–	England U20	2	(0)
- * Club domestic league appearances and goals as of 16:10, 21 November 2026 (UTC) ‡ National team caps and goals as of 19:15, 29 May 2026 (UTC)

Lola Sangita Brown (born 31 October 2007) is a professional footballer who plays as a midfielder for Women's Super League club Chelsea. Born in Malta, she has represented England at international youth levels, and currently plays for the England under-20 team. Brown previously played for Crystal Palace on loan.

== Early life ==
Lola Sangita Brown was born on 31 October 2007 in Sliema, Malta, and began playing football alongside her brother. She moved to England at the age of eight.

Brown attended Bede School. She has stated that her favourite GCSE subject was art.

Brown's family are ‘‘massive’’ Chelsea fans. She has described Frank Lampard, Eden Hazard, Fran Kirby, and Lucy Bronze as her childhood heroes; she played alongside the latter two at Chelsea. In 2022, following the Lionesses victory at the 2022 Euro, Brown was selected to carry the trophy out to the team at the celebration event in Trafalgar Square.

== Youth career ==
Brown began playing football at the All Stars Soccer Academy in Eastbourne, initially training with boys.

In 2019, Brown joined Chelsea's academy, beginning at the under-12 level, and she was named the Chelsea Women's Academy U18 Player of the Year for the 2023–24 season.

== Club career ==
=== Chelsea, 2024– ===
On 18 November 2024, Brown signed her first professional contract with academy club Chelsea, signing on for three years. Two days later, on 20 November 2024, she made her debut for the senior team as a substitute in a 3–0 Champions League win over Celtic. In April 2025, Chelsea manager Sonia Bompastor described Brown as ‘‘one of the most talented young players in England’’ and as having a ‘‘ruthless mentality.’’ Brown was named the club's Women's Academy Player of the Season on 4 May 2025. On the same day, she made her Women's Super League debut for Chelsea, coming on as a substitute in a 1–0 win over Tottenham.

==== Loan to Crystal Palace, 2025–26 ====
On 7 August 2025, it was announced that Brown would play on loan with Women's Super League 2 club Crystal Palace for the 2025–26 season. She played in Palace's opening game of the season, a 1–0 loss to Charlton Athletic. In late 2025, Brown was ruled out for a number of Palace's games due to injury. She was part of the Palace squad which won promotion to the WSL at the conclusion of the 2025–26 season.

==== Return to Chelsea, 2026– ====
In May 2026, Brown was included in Chelsea's team for the World Sevens, a seven-a-side invitational competition. She scored her first senior goal for Chelsea in a 5–2 win against London City Lionesses. Chelsea won the tournament, defeating Manchester United 6–5.

On 24 August 2026, Brown signed a new contract with the club, extending her stay until at least 2029.

== International career ==
Brown was part of the England under-17 squad which won silver at the 2024 Women's Under-17 Euro. She was named to the Best XI of the tournament. Brown also represented England at the 2024 U-17 Women's World Cup, scoring a penalty in England's 2–0 victory over Kenya on 17 October 2024. In the quarterfinal, she was the first penalty-taker for England in their shootout win over Japan, helping the team progress to the semi-finals.

Brown featured in the England under-19 team at the 2025 Women's Under-19 Euro.

During February and March 2026, Brown was capped for the England under-20 team, including in a 4–1 win against Mexico where she provided an assist. In April 2026, Brown was included in the England under-19 squad for the second round of qualifying for the 2026 Women's Under-19 Euro. In May 2026, she was again called up to the under-20 team for a training camp and series of games to be played in June in preparation for the 2026 Women's U-20 World Cup. On 21 August 2026, Brown was named to England's squad for the tournament.

== Personal life ==
In July 2026, Brown shared on her Instagram that her mother had died. As of August 2026, Brown lives with Chelsea and England youth teammate Nelly Las.

Brown wanted to dye her hair blonde if England reached the 2024 Under-17 Euro finals, and did so following their success; the look was described as ‘‘trademark’’ by British Vogue.

== Career Statistics ==
=== Club ===
As of match played 21 November 2026

Appearances and goals by club, season and competition
Club	Season	League			Cup (Note: Include Women's FA Cup)		League Cup (Note: Include WSL Players Cup/Women's League Cup)		Europe (Note: Include UEFA Women's Champions League)		Total	
Club	Season	Division	Apps	Goals	Apps	Goals	Apps	Goals	Apps	Goals	Apps	Goals
Chelsea	2024–25	WSL	1	0	0	0	0	0	2	0	3	0
Chelsea	2026–27	WSL	1	0	0	0	—		0	0	1	0
Total			2	0	0	0	0	0	2	0	4	0
Crystal Palace (loan)	2025–26	WSL 2	10	0	0	0	1	0	—		11	0
Total			10	0	0	0	1	0	—		11	0
Career total			12	0	0	0	1	0	4	0	15	0

== Honours ==
Chelsea

- Women's Super League: 2024–25

=== Individual ===
- Chelsea Women's Academy U18 Player of the Year: 2023–24
- Chelsea Women's Academy Player of the Season: 2024–25
