= Anaïs Ebayilin =

French footballer (born 2007)

Personal information
- Date of birth: 17 December 2007 (age 18)
- Place of birth: Clichy, France
- Height: 1.67 m (5 ft 6 in)
- Position: Midfielder

Team information
- Current team: Paris Saint-Germain
- Number: 26

Youth career
- 2016–2020: AS Pierrefitte
- 2020–2022: AAS Sarcelles
- 2022–2024: Paris Saint-Germain

Senior career*
Years	Team	Apps	(Gls)
2024–	Paris Saint-Germain	22	(1)

International career^{‡}
2022–2024	France U17	16	(6)
2025	France U19	5	(1)
2026–	France	2	(0)
- * Club domestic league appearances and goals as of 25 April 2026 ‡ National team caps and goals as of 10 October 2026

Anaïs Ebayilin (born 17 December 2007) is a French professional footballer who plays as a midfielder for Première Ligue club Paris Saint-Germain and the France national team.

== Early life ==
Born in Clichy, Hauts-de-Seine, a suburb of Paris, France, Ebayilin is of Ivorian descent.

Ebayilin began playing football at the age of nine, having been introduced to the sport by her twin brother, and started her youth career at Pierrefitte before moving to AAS Sarcelles four years later, where she progressed through the club's youth ranks and featured in boys' teams at under-14 level, during which she was appointed captain. She subsequently joined the Paris Saint-Germain FC Youth Academy, continuing her development in a structured and competitive setting.

== Club career ==
=== Paris Saint-Germain FC, 2022–present ===
On 14 January 2024, Ebayilin made her first-team debut at the age of 16, featuring in a 4–0 Coupe de France win over CPB Bréquigny Football, coming on as a substitute for Ramona Bachmann. A month later, She signed her first professional contract with Paris Saint-Germain, committing to the club until June 2026. On 24 April 2024, she scored her first goal for the senior team, an equalizer in a 1–1 draw against Paris FC.

== International career ==
At youth international level, Ebayilin played for the France under-17 team, earning sixteen caps and scoring 6 goals. She also made five appearances for the under-19 side in 2025.

In February 2026, at the age of eighteen, she was named to the senior team squad for the 2027 FIFA Women's World Cup qualification matches against Republic of Ireland and Poland. She earned her first cap for the senior team during the first match against the Republic of Ireland on 3 March 2026, coming on as a substitute for Oriane Jean-François in the 86th minute. At 18 years and 77 days old, she became the youngest French women's international since Inès Dhaou in 2005.

== Personal life ==
Ebayilin considers Paul Pogba, Eberechi Eze, Sakina Karchaoui and Grace Geyoro her football inspirations.

== Career statistics ==
=== Club ===
As of match played 25 April 2026

Appearances and goals by club, season and competition
Club	Season	League			National cup		League cup		Continental		Other		Total	
Club	Season	Division	Apps	Goals	Apps	Goals	Apps	Goals	Apps	Goals	Apps	Goals	Apps	Goals
Paris Saint-Germain	2023–24	D1F	6	1	1	0	—		1 (Note: Appearance(s) in UEFA Women's Champions League)	0	0	0	8	1
Paris Saint-Germain	2024–25	Première Ligue	0	0	0	0	—		0	0	0	0	0	0
Paris Saint-Germain	2025–26	Première Ligue	16	0	4	1	2	0	4	0	0	0	26	1
Career total			22	1	5	1	2	0	5	0	0	0	34	2

=== International ===
As of match played 10 October 2026

Appearances and goals by national team and year
National team	Year	Apps	Goals
France	2026	2	0
Total		2	0
