= Jessie Gale =

English footballer (born 2006)

Personal information
- Full name: Jessie May Gale
- Date of birth: 22 August 2006 (age 20)
- Place of birth: Sevenoaks, England
- Position: Striker

Team information
- Current team: Newcastle United (on loan from Arsenal)
- Number: 30

Youth career
- –2024: Charlton Athletic
- 2024–2025: Arsenal

Senior career*
Years	Team	Apps	(Gls)
2024–2025	→ Watford (dual registration)	0	(0)
2025–	Arsenal	0	(0)
2025–2026	→ Portsmouth (loan)	11	(4)
2026	→ Bristol City (loan)	12	(4)
2026–	→ Newcastle United (loan)	3	(0)

International career^{‡}
2024–2025	England U19	12	(5)
2025–	England U20	12	(4)
2026–	England U23	4	(0)
- * Club domestic league appearances and goals as of 16:31, 28 October 2026 (UTC) ‡ National team caps and goals as of 09:17, 9 September 2026 (UTC)

Jessie May Gale (born 22 August 2006) is an English professional footballer who plays as a striker for Women's Super League 2 team Newcastle United, on loan from Arsenal, and the England under-20 and under-23 national teams. She has previously played for Watford (on a dual registration contract), and on loan for Portsmouth and Bristol City.

== Early life ==
Jessie May Gale was born on 22 August 2006 in Sevenoaks, Kent. She has an older brother, Sam Gale, who is also a professional footballer and Arsenal academy graduate. He played in the same Arsenal team as David Beckham's son Cruz. Gale, who spent time on the sidelines of her brother's training sessions and matches, credits David Beckham with ‘‘literally show[ing] [her] how to kick a ball.’’ She has stated that Beckham told her mother she would grow up to represent England.

Gale played both cricket and football growing up, with cricket her priority until she was 14.

== Youth career ==
Gale began her youth career with the academy side of Charlton Athletic, joining the club after a successful trial when she was 14.

In January 2024, Gale joined Arsenal's academy. In May 2024, she won the Blue Stars/FIFA Youth Cup with Arsenal's under–21 team.

== Club career ==
=== Watford, 2024–25 ===
In the 2024–25 season, Gale joined Watford on a dual-registration deal. Her time was split between playing with Watford's senior side in the Women's National League and with Arsenal's under-21 team (with whom she won the PGA League Under-21 Division One title).

=== Arsenal, 2025– ===
On 8 July 2025, Gale signed her first professional contract with Arsenal.

==== Loan to Portsmouth, 2025 ====
On 3 September 2025, Gale joined Women's Super League 2 (WSL2) side Portsmouth on a season-long loan. On 9 January 2026, Arsenal recalled Gale from her loan. She scored 5 goals for Portsmouth in 15 appearances across all competitions.

==== Loan to Bristol City, 2026 ====
On 10 January 2026, Gale joined fellow WSL2 team Bristol City for the remainder of the 2025–26 season. A day later, she made her debut for Bristol City, and scored her first goal for the club; the goal won Barclays WSL2 Goal of the Month for January and was later named Bristol City's Champagne Moment of the Year. The goal would also go on to be nominated for Barclays WSL2 Goal of the Season. On 31 January 2026, she scored a first-half brace as City defeated Sunderland 3–0. Gale won January’s PFA WSL2 Fans’ Player of the Month Award and Bristol City's Player of the Month. She was also nominated for Barclays Women’s Super League 2 Player of the Month award.

==== Loan to Newcastle United, 2026– ====
On 6 August 2026, Gale joined WSL2 side Newcastle United on loan for the 2026–27 season. On 27 September 2026, Gale made her club debut, coming on as a late substitute in Newcastle's 4–0 victory over Leicester City.

== International career ==
Gale received her first call up to the England under-19 team in October 2024, as the squad competed in the Algarve Cup. On 25 October 2024, she made her debut for the under-19 team in a 3–1 victory over the Netherlands. On 20 November 2024, Gale was called up to the squad for the first round of 2025 Under-19 Euro qualification campaign.

She scored her first goal for the under-19 team in February 2025, as England beat the USA 2–0. In June 2025, Gale was named to England's squad for the Euro. England were eliminated in the group stage following a 1–0 loss to reigning champions (and eventual title defenders) Spain, in which Gale was an unused substitute. On 19 November 2025, Gale was called up to England's under-20 squad for a preparation camp ahead of the 2026 U-20 World Cup. It was the first time England had qualified for a women's under-20 World Cup since 2018. On 26 November 2025, Gale made her under-20 debut as a second-half substitute in England's 1–2 victory over China PR. Her first goal came on 29 November; Gale scored in the final minute of regulation time as England lost 1–4 to the USA.

In February 2026, Gale received her first call up to the England under-23 squad to replace Mia Enderby (who withdrew through injury). She made her debut for the team on 2 March 2026 as England beat France 0–1. On 17 April 2026, she was a part of the under-23 squad who won the 2025–26 U23 European Competition. Between May and August 2026, Gale was named to England's under-20 squad for a number of 2026 U-20 World Cup preparation camps and friendly fixtures. On 21 August 2026, Gale was called up to the final squad for the tournament. Gale scored in the team's final preparation match, an 11–0 victory over New Caledonia. She was a substitute in Englad's opening World Cup game, a 1–1 draw with Canada. On 8 September 2026, Gale scored England's fifth goal in their 5–1 group stage victory over Tanzania.

== Personal life ==
Gale has ADHD.

Her father is a fan of Liverpool F.C. Gale describes Arsenal teammate Alessia Russo as a ‘‘really good friend’’ and ‘‘the best person [Gale has] ever met off the pitch.’’

== Career statistics ==
As of match played 1 November 2026

Appearances and goals by club, season and competition
Club	Season	League			National cup (Note: Includes Women's FA Cup)		League cup (Note: Includes Women's National League Cup, WSL Cup/Women's League Cup)		Total	
Club	Season	Division	Apps	Goals	Apps	Goals	Apps	Goals	Apps	Goals
Watford (dual registration)	2024–25	FA WNL	5	5	0	0	1	0	6	5
Portsmouth (loan)	2025–26	WSL2	11	4	1	0	3	1	15	5
Bristol City (loan)	2025–26	WSL2	11	4	1	0	0	0	12	4
Newcastle United (loan)	2026–27	WSL2	3	0	0	0	3	0	6	0
Career total			30	13	2	0	7	1	39	14

== Honours ==
=== Arsenal ===
- Blue Stars/FIFA Youth Cup: 2024
- PGA League Under-21 Division One: 2024–25

=== England ===
- U23 European Competition: 2025–26
