= Ava Baker =

English footballer (born 2006)

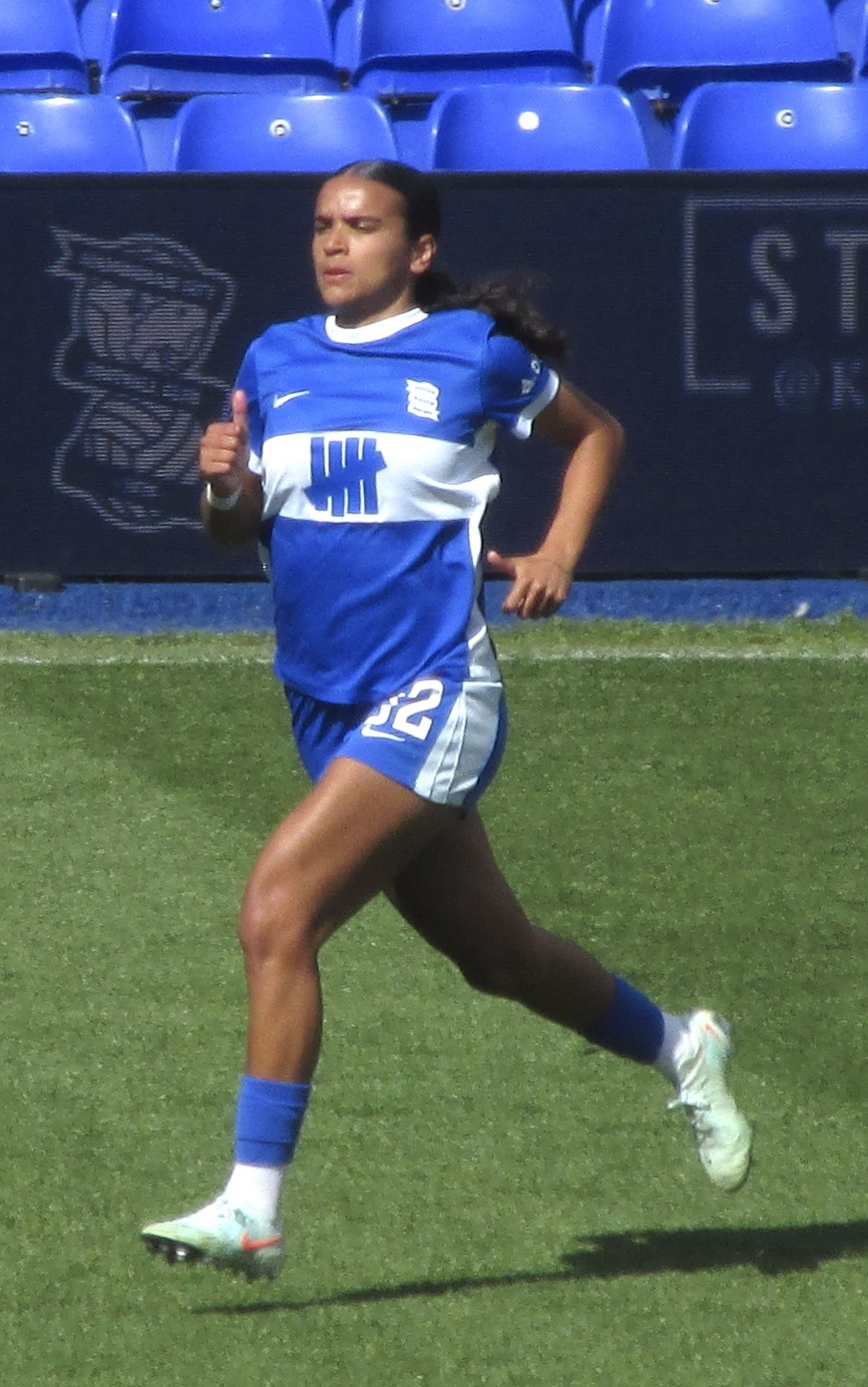
- Baker training with Birmingham City in 2025

Personal information
- Full name: Ava Ann Louise Baker
- Date of birth: 9 January 2006 (age 20)
- Place of birth: England,
- Position: Midfielder

Team information
- Current team: Sheffield United (on loan from Birmingham City)
- Number: 32

Youth career
- –2022: Leicester City

Senior career*
Years	Team	Apps	(Gls)
2022–2024	Leicester City	19	(1)
2024–	Birmingham City	19	(1)
2026	→ Ipswich Town (loan)	0	(0)
2026–	→ Sheffield United (loan)	0	(0)

International career^{‡}
2022–2023	England U17	13	(10)
2023–	England U19	21	(8)
2025–	England U20	2	(2)
- * Club domestic league appearances and goals as of 12:33, 30 January 2026 (UTC) ‡ National team caps and goals as of 23:59, 21 June 2025 (UTC)

Ava Ann Louise Baker (born 9 January 2006) is an English professional footballer who plays as a midfielder for Women's Super League 2 club Sheffield United, on loan from Birmingham City, and the England under-20 national team.

== Club career ==
Baker is a product of the Leicester City academy and on 12 January 2022 she made her senior debut as a starter against Manchester City in the FA Women's League Cup just three days after turning sixteen. She made her Women's FA Cup debut later that month, coming on as a substitute during a win against Tottenham Hotspur, before making her FA Women's Super League debut against Reading on 1 May 2022.

She also holds the record as the Foxes' youngest ever goalscorer, when she scored in Leicester's 5–0 League Cup victory against Sunderland on 11 January 2023, two days after her 17th birthday. On 27 May 2023, she scored her first WSL goal for the club in a 1–0 win against Brighton & Hove Albion, which saved the club from relegation.

On 24 June 2024, Baker was announced at Birmingham City.

On 29 January 2026, Ipswich Town announced that Baker had signed on loan for the remainder of the 2025-26 season.

On 3 September 2026, Baker was announced at Sheffield United on loan.

== International career ==
Baker has been capped by England at up to under-19 level, making her debut for the England under-17s against France on 24 March 2022, before a first goal against Poland.

== Career statistics ==
=== Club ===
As of match played 30 January 2026

Appearances and goals by club, season and competition
Club	Season	League			League Cup		FA Cup		Total	
Club	Season	Division	Apps	Goals	Apps	Goals	Apps	Goals	Apps	Goals
Leicester City	2021-2022	Women's Super League	2	0	1	0	1	0	4	0
Leicester City	2022-2023	Women's Super League	9	1	4	1	1	0	14	2
Leicester City	2023-2024	Women's Super League	8	0	2	0	1	0	11	0
Leicester City	Total		19	1	7	1	3	0	29	2
Birmingham City	2024-2025	Women's Super League 2	14	1	3	1	0	0	17	2
Birmingham City	2025-2026	Women's Super League 2	5	0	2	0	2	1	9	1
Ipswich Town (loan)	2025-2026	Women's Super League 2								
Career total			38	2	12	2	5	1	55	5
