= England women's national under-23 football team =

National association football team

England Women's under-23
- Nickname: The Young Lionesses
- Association: The Football Association
- Confederation: UEFA (Europe)
- Head coach: Lydia Bedford
- FIFA code: ENG
First colours	Second colours

Nordic Cup
- Appearances: 5 (first in 2004)
- Best result: Third (2005)

The England women's national under-23 football team, also known as England women Under-23s or England women U23(s), is an association football team operated under the auspices of The Football Association. Since 2021, it has replaced the now defunct England women's under-21 team.

Its primary role is the development of players in preparation for the senior England women's national football team. As long as they were eligible, players can play for England at any level, making it possible to play for the U23s, senior side, and again for the U23s, as Natasha Dowie, Rachel Williams and Danielle Buet have in the 2008–2018 era, as well as Katie Robinson, Jess Park, Maya Le Tissier and Ebony Salmon in the current era. In 2005 Casey Stoney played for the team in the Nordic Cup, despite already having 30 caps at senior level. It is also possible to play for one country at youth level and another at senior level (providing the player is eligible). Helen Lander and Kylie Davies decided to play for Wales at senior level after playing for England U23s, while Sophie Perry elected to play for Ireland.

== History ==
=== Beginnings ===
In February 1987 the Women's Football Association (WFA) appointed Liz Deighan to run a women's national under-21 team. Deighan had been a star midfielder in the England team which reached the 1984 European Competition for Women's Football. Four years later Deighan was not re–appointed and John Bilton took over. The team folded shortly afterwards because the WFA had run out of money. Eight of England's squad at the 1995 FIFA Women's World Cup had come through Deighan's U-21 team, including Pauline Cope, Karen Burke and Louise Waller.

=== FA sanctioned team ===
In summer 2004, The Football Association (FA) decided to reconstitute the U-21 team in order to give women a higher level of play to better prepare them for the full national team. Senior team manager Hope Powell held a four-day camp in Shropshire and announced: "This is a major step forward for our international teams and will bridge the gap between Under-19 and Senior levels. We have been observing players in this age bracket for the last six months and with the clubs' assistance I believe we can make this a real success." Powell installed her full-time assistant with the senior team, Brent Hills, as coach of the team, which remained an U-21 selection from 2004 through 2008.

=== Competing as an U-23 team (2008–2018) ===
2008 saw the change of England's youth national women's team moved to the U-23 level. The move was made by the FA in response to age-level changes FIFA had made to its oldest women's youth competition, now named FIFA U-20 Women's World Cup. The age limit was raised from being a U-19 tournament to a U-20 tournament. This adjustment, coupled with a newly introduced U-23 age limit to the Nordic Cup, prompted the FA to rethink and eventually change the youth development team. The team continues to serve as a stepping-stone for players to the England women's national team. Brent Hills explained that it had become more of a challenge to break into the senior team: "When I started, if you were an extremely talented 18-year-old you may have been able to get into the senior team. I'll give you an example, Fara Williams. You would have to be the next Kelly Smith now to be able to do that."

England U23s did not have a permanent home. When England hosted a tournament in 2010, the event was held at University of Warwick where it was possible to attend and watch without a ticket. Because of the smaller demand compared to the senior women's national team, much smaller grounds could be used.

The team's last competitive tournament was the 2012 Four Nations Tournament, in which England finished third. They also competed in a variety of competitions, including the annual Nordic Cup, which was previously the top competition for this age group.

=== Move to U-21 system (2018–2021) ===
In a bid to better aid the transition between the youth pathway and senior football, the FA announced in September 2018 that they were scrapping the U23s and U20s levels in order to form an Under-21s age group, which would become the top tier of the nation's professional development phase. The move would align England's structure to that used in other European countries to allow for more age-appropriate games and better manage individual player development post-U20 World Cup for those who have genuine senior team potential. The then U20s manager Mo Marley was announced as head coach.

=== Return of U-23 level (2021–present) ===
In October 2021, the FA announced the return of an under-23 team as newly appointed senior manager Sarina Wiegman looked to increase international playing opportunities for promising players in the senior pathway, particularly those who had aged out of the under-21 squad. Mo Marley was appointed head coach and tasked with also mentoring Emma Coates and Fara Williams as coaches. The move came off the back of the cancellation of two editions of the UEFA Women's Under-19 Championship and one FIFA U-20 Women's World Cup as a result of the COVID-19 pandemic, further limiting opportunities for youth international experience.

In July 2023, a new U23 European League was announced for the 2023–2024 season, from September 2023 until April 2024. The league features nine European teams; England, Belgium, France, Italy, Netherlands, Norway, Portugal, Spain and Sweden. With the difficulty of transitioning from the under-19 team to the senior team, England women's technical director, Kay Cossington, wants the team to be "really connected with the senior team".

In the summer of 2023, further coaches were added to the squad; Remi Allen, Anita Asante, and former Aston Villa manager Gemma Davies. In April 2024, the under-23 team ended the U23 European League unbeaten, while competing against eight national teams.

In December 2025, Coates and her assist Davies left the under-23 setup in order to join American National Women's Soccer League club Bay FC. In February 2026, under-19s manager Lauren Smith was named interim manager, assisted by Geraint Twose and Izzy Christiansen, while the search for a new permanent manager continued. Lydia Bedford was named permanent head coach on 9 March 2026.

== Current players ==
On 30 September 2026, the following players were named to the squad for a match against Sweden in October 2026.

Names in bold denote players who have been capped for the senior team.

Head coach: Lydia Bedford

No.	Pos.	Player	Date of birth (age)	Club
	GK	Eve Annets	19 March 2006 (age 20)	(Scottish Football Association) Hibernian
	GK	Kaiya Jota	5 February 2006 (age 20)	(United States Soccer Federation) University of Stanford
	GK	Sophia Poor	25 June 2006 (age 20)	(The Football Association) London City Lionesses
	DF	Brooke Aspin	1 July 2005 (age 21)	(The Football Association) Bristol City
	DF	Cerys Brown	22 June 2005 (age 21)	(The Football Association) Nottingham Forest
	DF	Megan Collett	11 July 2005 (age 21)	(The Football Association) Southampton
	DF	Teyah Goldie	27 June 2004 (age 22)	(The Football Association) Crystal Palace (loan)
	DF	Nelly Las	17 March 2007 (age 19)	(The Football Association) Chelsea
	DF	Naomi Layzell	29 February 2004 (age 22)	(The Football Association) Everton (loan)
	DF	Gracie Prior	2 December 2004 (age 21)	(The Football Association) Manchester City
	DF	Hannah Silcock	18 September 2004 (age 22)	(The Football Association) Everton
	DF	Jess Simpson	13 January 2005 (age 21)	(The Football Association) Manchester United)
	MF	Sarah Brasero-Carreira	1 September 2004 (age 22)	(Royal Spanish Football Federation) Deportivo Alavés
	MF	Laila Harbert	3 January 2007 (age 19)	(United States Soccer Federation) San Diego Wave
	MF	Sophie Harwood	23 December 2007 (age 18)	(The Football Association) Sheffield United (loan)
	MF	Lexi Lloyd-Smith	5 March 2003 (age 23)	(The Football Association) Crystal Palace
	FW	Keira Barry	13 June 2005 (age 21)	(United States Soccer Federation) Bay FC
	FW	Mia Enderby	31 May 2005 (age 21)	(The Football Association) Liverpool
	FW	Lenna Gunning-Williams	5 February 2005 (age 21)	(The Football Association) Tottenham Hotspur
	FW	Georgia Mullett	16 September 2005 (age 21)	(The Football Association) Aston Villa
	FW	Poppy Pritchard	3 December 2005 (age 20)	(The Football Association) Leicester City

=== Recent call-ups ===
The following players have also been called up to the England squad within the last 12 months.

Pos.	Player	Date of birth (age)	Caps	Goals	Club	Latest call-up
GK	Katie Cox	28 April 2006 (age 20)	-	-	(England) Nottingham Forest (loan)	v. Sweden, 17 April 2026
GK	**Khiara Keating**	27 June 2004 (age 22)	-	-	(England) Manchester City	v. Sweden, 17 April 2026
GK	Natalia Negri	2 January 2004 (age 22)	-	-	(England) Ipswich Town	v. Sweden, 17 April 2026
DF	**Anouk Denton**	9 May 2003 (age 23)	-	-	(United States) Bay FC	v. Sweden, 17 April 2026
DF	Neve Herron	27 June 2003 (age 23)	-	-	(England) Birmingham City	v. Sweden, 17 April 2026
DF	Evie Rabjohn	28 April 2005 (age 21)	-	-	(Scotland) Celtic FC	v. Netherlands, 6 March 2026
DF	Chloe Sarwie	19 December 2008 (age 17)	-	-	(England) Chelsea	v. Sweden, 17 April 2026
DF	Mari Ward	3 January 2006 (age 20)	-	-	(England) Liverpool	v. Netherlands, 6 March 2026
MF	Eleanor Klinger	4 November 2006 (age 20)	-	-	(United States) University of Stanford	v. Sweden, 17 April 2026
MF	**Ruby Mace**	5 September 2003 (age 23)	-	-	(England) Everton	v. Sweden, 17 April 2026
MF	Olivia McLoughlin	15 October 2004 (age 22)	-	-	(England) Leicester City	v. Sweden, 17 April 2026
MF	Lexi Potter	17 August 2006 (age 20)	-	-	(England) Chelsea	v. Sweden, 17 April 2026
MF	Erica Meg Parkinson	18 April 2008 (age 18)	-	-	(United States) North Carolina Courage	v. Netherlands, 6 March 2026
MF	Maisie Symonds	2 February 2003 (age 23)	-	-	(England) Brighton & Hove Albion	v. Netherlands, 6 March 2026
MF	Vivienne Lia	27 September 2006 (age 20)	-	-	(Germany) Eintracht Frankfurt	v. Sweden, 17 April 2026
FW	Jessie Gale	23 August 2006 (age 20)	-	-	(England) Newcastle United (loan)	v. Sweden, 17 April 2026
FW	Isobel Goodwin	21 December 2002 (age 23)	-	-	(England) London City Lionesses	v. Sweden, 17 April 2026
INJ = Withdrew due to injury; TRN = Called up for training only; SNR = Called up to senior squad

== Recent schedule and results ==
This list includes match results from the past 12 months, as well as any future matches that have been scheduled.

=== 2025 ===
23 October 2025 2025/26 European U23 League Group Stage	Germany	5–0	England	Fulda, Germany
17:15 BST (UTC+01:00)	Mühlhaus 26', 30'; Weidauer 57', 69'; Janzen 72'	Report		Stadium: Sportpark Johannisau

27 October 2025 2025/26 European U23 League Group Stage	England	1–1	Portugal	Northampton, England
19:00 BST (UTC+01:00)	Barry 55'	Report	Bravo 8'	Stadium: Sixfields Stadium

27 November 2025 2025/26 European U23 League Group Stage	England	1–0	Norway	Manchester, England
	Isobel Goodwin 26'	Report		Stadium: Joie Stadium

1 December 2025 Friendly	England	2—4	United States	Accrington, England
	Simpson 53'; Barry 61'	Report	Adames 2'; Dahlien 43'; Weber 57'; Sentnor 73'	Stadium: Crown Ground

=== 2026 ===
2 March 2026 2025/26 European U23 League Group Stage	France	0–1	England	Vallée de Chevreuse, France
12:00 GMT		Report	Lloyd-Smith 43'	Stadium: INF Clairefontaine

6 March 2026 2025/26 European U23 League Group Stage	England	1–1	Netherlands	Shrewsbury, England
19:00 GMT	Gunning-Williams 11'	Report	Oude Elberink 90+6'	Stadium: New Meadow

13 April 2026 2025/26 European U23 League Semi-Final	England	1–0	Netherlands	Murcia, Spain
16:00 BST (UTC+01:00)	Goodwin 46'	Report

17 April 2026 2025/26 European U23 League Final	England	3–0	Sweden	Murcia, Spain
11:00 BST (UTC+01:00)	Goodwin 4'; Silcock 9'; McLoughlin 56'	Report

== Coaching staff ==
=== Current information ===
As of 9 March 2026

Position	Staff	Ref
Head Coach	(England) Lydia Bedford	
Assistant Coach	(England) Izzy Christiansen	
Assistant Coach	(Wales) Geraint Twose	
Goalkeeping Coach	(England) Wayne Brown	

=== Managerial History ===
Name	Years active
(England) Liz Deighan	1987–1992
(England) Brent Hills	2004–2013
(England) Marieanne Spacey	2013–2018
(England) Mo Marley	2021–2023
(England) Emma Coates	2023–2025
(England) Lydia Bedford	2026–

== Bibliography ==
- Lopez, Sue (1997). Women on the Ball: A Guide to Women's Football. London, England: Scarlet Press. ISBN 1857270169.
