= Niamh Peacock =

English footballer (born 2008)

- Peacock in 2026

Personal information
- Full name: Niamh Lucy Peacock
- Date of birth: 22 March 2008 (age 18)
- Position: Defender

Team information
- Current team: West Ham United
- Number: 26

Youth career
- 2013–2016: Isleworthians Youth FC
- 2016–2026: Arsenal

Senior career*
Years	Team	Apps	(Gls)
2025–2026	Arsenal	0	(0)
2025–2026	→ Watford (loan)	8	(0)
2026	→ Portsmouth F.C. (ADR)	6	(0)
2026–	West Ham United	0	(0)

International career
2022–2024	England U15		
2024–2025	England U17		
2025–	England U19		
2026–	England U20		
- * Club domestic league appearances and goals

Niamh Lucy Peacock (born 22 March 2008) is an English professional footballer who plays as a defender for Women's Super League club West Ham United. She has represented England at the under-15, under-17, and under-20 levels. She is the first-ever player in Women's Super League 2 history to be signed on an Academy Development Registration (ADR).

== Early life ==
Peacock began playing football at the age of five, joining her local team, Isleworthians Youth FC, where she was the only girl on the team.

She was encouraged to attend a Chelsea FC Talent ID session aged 5 & a half, and impressed the club but was too young to play for their U7s team. However, Chelsea allowed her to attend their weekly sessions and Peacock stayed with them for a season and a half before trialling for Arsenal Women's U9’s Player Development Centre Team.

After a successful trial, Peacock officially joined the Arsenal academy at the age of eight, where she initially played as a midfielder.

== Club career ==
Peacock has represented Arsenal up to the under-21 level. She captained the team as they won the PGA League Under-21 Division One title in the 2024–25 season. She was called up to the senior team for the first time on 29 January 2025, where she was an unused substitute in Arsenal's 5–0 win over Bristol City in the fourth round of the FA Cup.

On 20 August 2025, it was announced that Peacock had joined FA Women's National League South side Watford on a dual-registration contract. She made her debut for the club on the same day, featuring in a 7–0 win over Charlton Athletic PGA.

On 30 January 2026, Peacock signed with WSL2 club Portsmouth, becoming the first player in the league's history to be signed on an Academy Development Registration, which allows the player to continue training with their parent club's academy while playing competitive matches for another club. She made her debut for Portsmouth on 8 February 2026, coming on as a substitute in a 2–1 loss against Ipswich Town.

In May 2026, it was announced that Peacock would be released by Arsenal in the summer of 2026.

=== West Ham United ===
On 9 July 2026, Women's Super League side West Ham United announced that Peacock had signed her first professional contract with the London side, signing for the Irons on a three-year deal. Peacock made her debut for West Ham on 30 September 2026, starting in their 3 - 1 win against Southampton in the League Cup.

== International career ==
Peacock has represented England at the under-15, under-17, under-19, and under-20 levels. She was part of the U17 squad at the FIFA Under-17 Women's World Cup in the Dominican Republic. She played for England during the qualification campaign for the 2026 UEFA Women's Under-19 European Championship.
