= Princess Ademiluyi =

English footballer (born 2006)

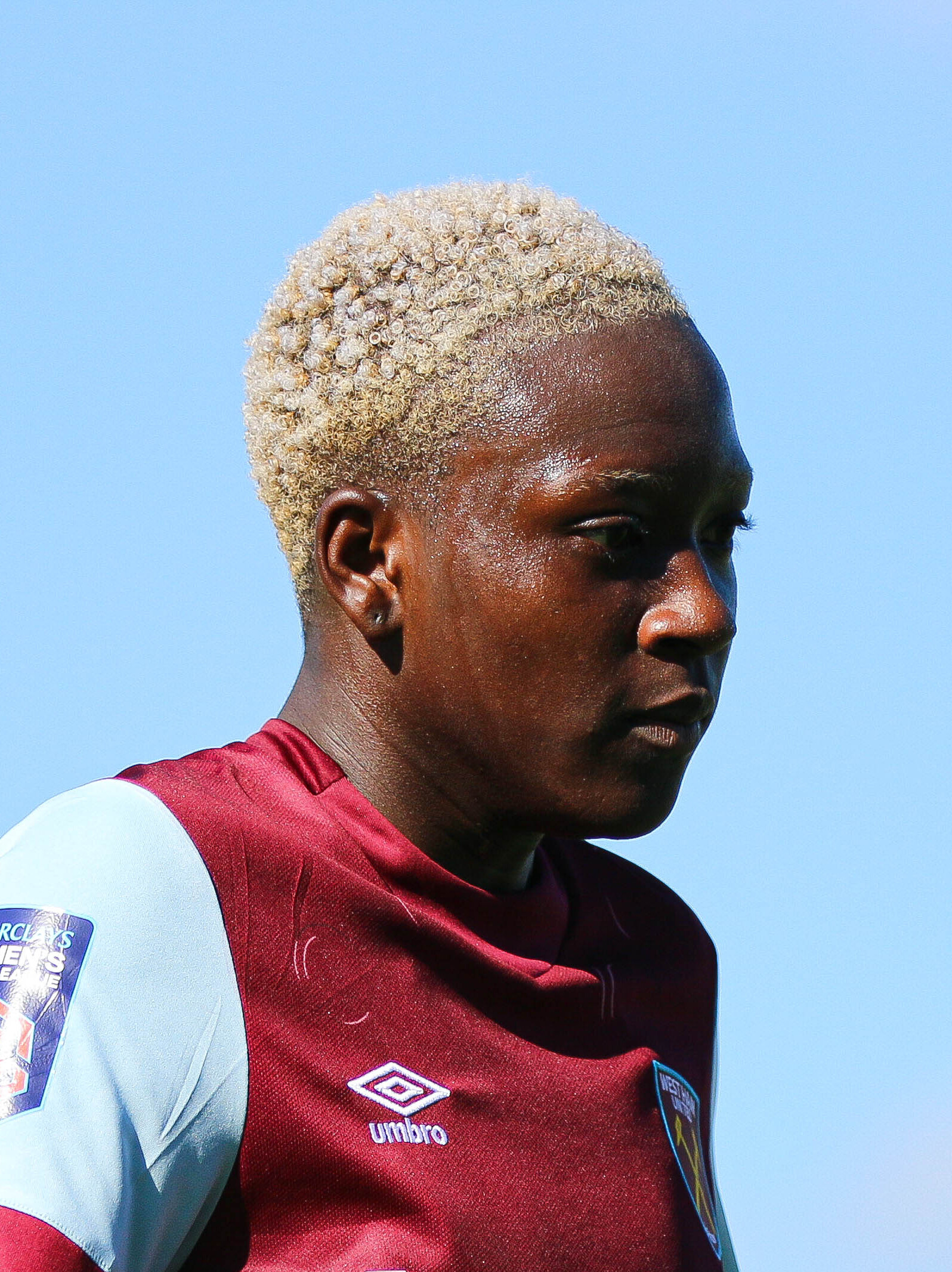
- Ademiluyi in 2023

Personal information
- Full name: Princess Esther Oyniade Ademiluyi
- Date of birth: 14 July 2006 (age 20)
- Place of birth: Gravesend, England
- Height: 5 ft 8 in (1.72 m)
- Position: Forward

Team information
- Current team: Ipswich Town
- Number: 99

Youth career
- 2008–2023: West Ham United

Senior career*
| Years | Team | Apps | (Gls) |
| 2023–2025 | West Ham United | 19 | (0) |
| 2024–2025 | → Charlton Athletic (loan) | 10 | (0) |
| 2025– | Gotham FC | 0 | (0) |
| 2025 | → Fort Lauderdale United (loan) | 10 | (0) |
| 2026– | → Ipswich Town (loan) | 0 | (0) |

International career^{‡}
| 2024–2025 | England U19 | 11 | (6) |
| 2025– | England U20 | 9 | (6) |
- * Club domestic league appearances and goals as of 16:05, 10 January 2026 (UTC) ‡ National team caps and goals as of 23:42, 21 June 2025

Princess Esther Oyniade Ademiluyi (Yoruba: [àdèmílújì]; born 14 July 2006) is an English professional footballer who plays as a forward for Women's Super League 2 club Ipswich Town, on loan from Gotham FC of the National Women’s Soccer League (NWSL), and the England under-20 national team.

== Club career ==
=== West Ham United ===
Born in Gravesend, Kent, Ademiluyi grew up playing cage football with her brother. She attended her first trial with West Ham United when she was 12. After having worked her way through different age groups, Ademiluyi was invited by manager Paul Konchesky to train with West Ham's senior squad ahead of the 2022–23 season. In March 2023, she became available for selection for first team games. On 7 May 2023, Ademiluyi made her senior debut in a 1–0 Women's Super League defeat to Brighton & Hove Albion. She became the first player to go through West Ham Foundation’s Player Pathway and appear for the women's senior team. On 14 July 2024, her 18th birthday, Ademiluyi signed her first professional contract with West Ham.

On 28 July 2024, Ademiluyi joined Women's Championship side Charlton Athletic on loan for the 2024–25 season. She returned to West Ham in January 2025, having played 14 games for Charlton across all competitions.

=== Gotham FC ===
On 1 September 2025, West Ham confirmed that Ademiluyi had joined National Women's Soccer League (NWSL) side Gotham FC for an undisclosed fee. One week later, Ademiluyi was loaned to Fort Lauderdale United of the USL Super League, joining Gotham teammate Stella Nyamekye. She was recalled by Gotham on 9 January 2026.

On 3 February 2026, it was announced that Ademiluyi would spend the remainder of the year on loan with WSL 2 club Ipswich Town.

== International career ==
On 16 October 2024, Ademiluyi was called up to the England under-19 team for Algarve Cup matches against the Netherlands and Norway. She made her debut on 25 October as England beat the Netherlands 3–1. During a 0–10 2025 Under-19 Euro qualifying win over Ukraine, Ademiluyi scored four goals, including a 13-minute hat-trick. She was called up to England's squad for the final tournament. On 15 June 2025, Ademiluyi scored a goal in the team's opening game against the Netherlands.

On 19 November 2025, Ademiluyi was called up to England's under-20 squad for a preparation camp ahead of the 2026 U-20 World Cup. She made her debut for the team on 29 November, as England were defeated 1–4 by the USA. On 21 August 2026, Ademiluyi was called to the final squad for the World Cup. In the team's final preparation match—and 11–0 victory over New Caledonia—Ademiluyi scored an eight-minute hat-trick, and added a fourth goal two minutes later.

== Career statistics ==
=== Club ===
As of match played 20 December 2025

Appearances and goals by club, season and competition
| Club | Season | League | | | National cup (Note: Includes Women's FA Cup) | | League cup (Note: Includes FA Women's League Cup) | | Total | |
| Club | Season | Division | Apps | Goals | Apps | Goals | Apps | Goals | Apps | Goals |
|---|---|---|---|---|---|---|---|---|---|---|
| West Ham United | 2022–23 | Women's Super League | 2 | 0 | 0 | 0 | 0 | 0 | 2 | 0 |
| West Ham United | 2023–24 | Women's Super League | 11 | 0 | 1 | 0 | 3 | 0 | 15 | 0 |
| West Ham United | 2024–25 | Women's Super League | 6 | 0 | 0 | 0 | 0 | 0 | 6 | 0 |
| West Ham United | Total | | 19 | 0 | 1 | 0 | 3 | 0 | 23 | 0 |
| Charlton Athletic (loan) | 2024–25 | Women's Championship | 10 | 0 | 0 | 0 | 3 | 0 | 13 | 0 |
| Fort Lauderdale United FC (loan) | 2025–26 | USL Super League | 9 | 0 | 0 | 0 | 0 | 0 | 9 | 0 |
| Career total | | | 38 | 0 | 1 | 0 | 6 | 0 | 45 | 0 |

== Personal life ==
Ademiluyi is of Nigerian descent. She has her own fashion brand, and describes designing clothes as her passion away from football.
