= Laila Harbert =

English footballer (born 2007)

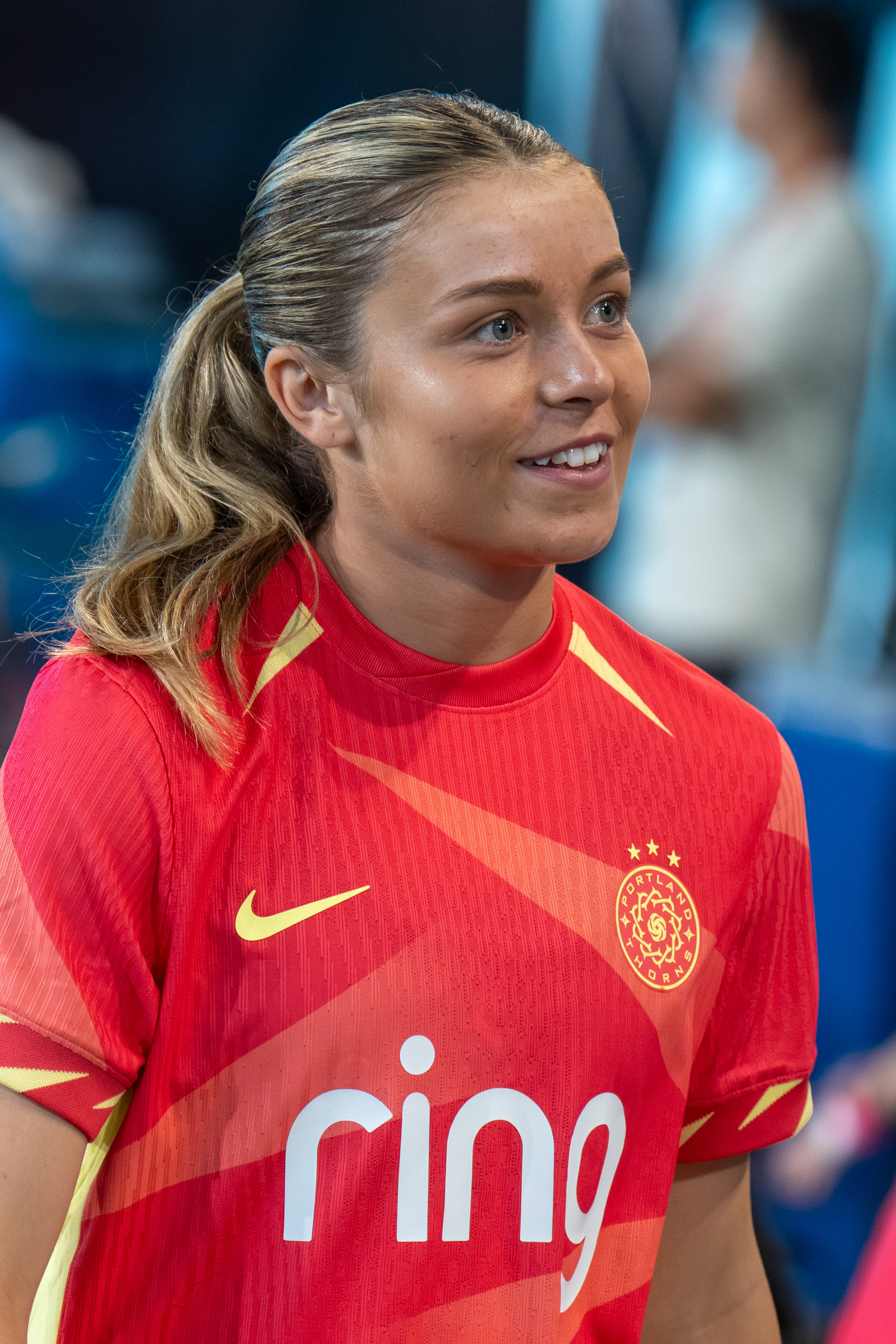
- Harbert with the Portland Thorns in 2025

Personal information
- Full name: Laila Minni Harbert
- Date of birth: 3 January 2007 (age 19)
- Place of birth: England
- Height: 1.65 m (5 ft 5 in)
- Position: Midfielder

Team information
- Current team: San Diego Wave
- Number: 4

Youth career
- 2016–2025: Arsenal

Senior career*
Years	Team	Apps	(Gls)
2025–2026	Arsenal	0	(0)
2023–2024	→ Watford (loan)	14	(0)
2025	→ Southampton (loan)	9	(0)
2025	→ Portland Thorns (loan)	5	(0)
2026	→ Everton (loan)	1	(0)
2026–	San Diego Wave	10	(0)

International career^{‡}
2021–2023	England U17	30	(5)
2024–2025	England U19	8	(1)
2025–	England U20	3	(0)
2025–	England U23	1	(0)
- * Club domestic league appearances and goals as of 16:42, 15 November 2026 (UTC) ‡ National team caps and goals as of 28 October 2025

Laila Minni Harbert (born 3 January 2007) is an English professional footballer who plays as a midfielder for San Diego Wave FC of the National Women's Soccer League (NWSL) and the England under-23 national team. She started her career with Women's Super League club Arsenal before going on loan to English clubs Watford, Southampton, and Everton, in addition to the Portland Thorns of the NWSL.

== Early life ==
Harbert grew up in Bexley, playing with a boys' team that her father coached. She moved to be closer to the Arsenal training grounds as she got to secondary school age, having joined the Arsenal Academy at age nine, and trained with the boys team between 12 and 15 years old.

== Club career ==
=== Arsenal ===
On 24 May 2024, Harbert made her senior, non-competitive, debut for Arsenal in their 1–0 win against A-League All-Stars Women as part of Arsenal's 2024 post-season tour. She then went on to feature in Arsenal's 1–2 win against Washington Spirit, coming on as a sub for Alessia Russo in the 78th minute. Harbert signed her first professional contract with Arsenal on 3 January 2025 after nine years at the club.

At the start of the 2023–2024 season, Harbert signed on dual-sign agreement with Women's National League side Watford alongside fellow Young Gunners Michelle Agyemang and Katie Reid. She featured in 17 games for Watford across all competitions, scoring her first senior goal and hat-trick in a 6–1 win away at Southampton to keep Watford in the FA Cup.

After signing her first professional contract with parent club Arsenal, Harbert signed on loan for the remainder of the 2024–25 season with Women's Championship side Southampton FC on 23 January 2025. Harbert made 9 appearances across all competitions for Saints.

On 25 August 2025, Harbert joined NWSL club Portland Thorns FC on a loan through the remainder of the Thorns' 2025 campaign. She made her NWSL debut one month later, coming on as a second-half substitute for Hina Sugita in a 26 September defeat to Gotham FC.

On 28 January 2026, Harbert joined WSL club Everton on loan through to the end of the 2025–26 season.

=== San Diego Wave ===
In July 2026, Harbert signed for San Diego Wave FC of the National Women's Soccer League on a three-year deal through 2029. She made her Wave debut on 14 August 2026, coming on as a substitute for Laurina Fazer in a 1–1 draw with the Denver Summit.

== International career ==
Harbert has represented the England Under-17, Under-19 and Under-23 national teams.

Harbert was part of the England squad who got to the semi-final of the 2023 UEFA Women's Under-17 Championship, where they ended their run with a 3–1 defeat to Spain in the semi-finals. The midfielder later captained the Under-17 side to the final of the 2024 UEFA Women's Under-17 Championship, where they were again beaten by Spain in a 0–4 loss in Malmö, Sweden.

Towards the end of 2024, Harbert was also given the captain's armband for the 2024 FIFA U-17 Women's World Cup as England looked to overcome their previous defeats by rivals Spain. The England side were defeated again in the semi-finals by the Spanish team, and then beaten by the United States in the third-place playoff to finish fourth.

Harbert made her Under-19 debut in the Albir Garden Tournament in yet another defeat to Spain, starting all three of England's games in the tournament.

Harbert received her first call-up for the Under-23 squad on 15 October 2025, making the jump up from the U-19 squad.

Having made her debut for the Under-23s in a 5-0 defeat to Germany, Harbert then received her first call-up for the England Under-20 squad for their first training camp in preparation for the 2026 Under-20 World Cup. Harbert made her debut for the England Under-20 side in a 1-2 win against China.

== Playing style ==
Harbert has been described as a technical player with vision and a commanding presence. She is known for her passing, both short and long.

== Career statistics ==
=== Club ===
As of match on 16 May 2026

Appearances and goals by club, season and competition
Club	Season	League			League Cup		FA Cup		Total	
Club	Season	Division	Apps	Goals	Apps	Goals	Apps	Goals	Apps	Goals
Watford (loan)	2023–2024	FA Women's National League	14	0	2	0	1	3	17	3
Southampton FC (loan)	2024–2025	Women's Championship	9	0	—		—		9	0
Portland Thorns (loan)	2025	National Women's Soccer League	5	0	—		—		5	0
Everton (loan)	2025–2026	Women's Super League	1	0	0	0	0	0	1	0
Career total			29	0	2	0	1	3	32	3
