= England women's national under-19 football team =

National association football team

England Women's U-19
- Nickname: The Young Lionesses
- Association: The Football Association
- Confederation: UEFA (Europe)
- Head coach: John Salomon
- FIFA code: ENG
First colours	Second colours

UEFA Women's Under-19 Championship
- Appearances: 15 (first in 2002)
- Best result: Winners (2009)

FIFA U-20 Women's World Cup
- Appearances: 6 (first in 2002)
- Best result: 3rd (2018)

The England women's national under-19 football team, also known as England women Under-19s or England women U19(s), is a youth association football team operated under the auspices of The Football Association. Its primary role is the development of players in preparation for the senior England women's national football team and is the second highest tier of development behind the under-23 level. As long as they are eligible, players can play for England at any level, making it possible to play for the U19s, U23s or senior side, and again for the U19s. It is also possible to play for one country at youth level and another at senior level (providing the player is eligible).

The team primarily competes in the annual UEFA Women's Under-19 Championship and its qualification competition. In odd years, the team's performance in the tournament could qualify the under-20 team for the FIFA U-20 Women's World Cup. The team's best achievement to date is winning the 2009 UEFA Women's Under-19 Championship.

== FIFA U-20 Women's World Cup ==
The team has qualified six times for the FIFA U-20 Women's World Cup

Year	Result	Matches	Wins	Draws*	Losses	GF	GA
(Canada) 2002	Quarter-Finals	4	1	1	2	7	11
(Thailand) 2004	did not qualify						
(Russia) 2006	did not qualify						
(Chile) 2008	Quarter-Finals	4	1	2	1	4	5
(Germany) 2010	Group Stage	3	0	1	2	2	5
(Japan) 2012	did not qualify						
(Canada) 2014	Group Stage	3	0	2	1	3	4
(Papua New Guinea) 2016	did not qualify						
(France) 2018	Third Place	6	3	2	1	13	7
(Costa Rica) 2020	Cancelled due to the COVID-19 pandemic						
(Costa Rica) 2022	did not qualify						
(Colombia) 2024	did not qualify						
(Poland) 2026	Round of 16	4	1	1	2	7	7
Total	6/12	24	6	9	9	36	39

== UEFA Women's Under-19 Championship ==
Year	Result	GP	W	D	L	GF	GA	U-20 World Cup
(Sweden) 2002	Semi-finals	4	1	0	3	7	8	Quarter-finals
(Germany) 2003	Semi-finals	4	2	0	2	5	10	—
(Finland) 2004	Did not qualify							Did not qualify
(Hungary) 2005	Group stage	3	1	1	1	5	4	Did not qualify
(Switzerland) 2006	Did not qualify							—
(Iceland) 2007	Runners-up	5	3	1	1	8	4	Quarter-finals
(France) 2008	Group stage	3	1	1	1	4	4	—
(Belarus) 2009	Winners	5	4	1	0	12	0	Group stage
(North Macedonia) 2010	Runners-up	5	2	1	2	7	6	—
(Italy) 2011	Did not qualify							Did not qualify
(Turkey) 2012	Group stage	3	0	1	2	0	5	—
(Wales) 2013	Runners-up	5	3	1	1	10	2	Group stage
(Norway) 2014	Group stage	3	0	0	3	1	6	—
(Israel) 2015	Group stage	3	0	1	2	2	5	Did not qualify
(Slovakia) 2016	Did not qualify							—
(Northern Ireland) 2017	Group stage	3	1	0	2	2	4	Third place
(Switzerland) 2018	Did not qualify							—
(Scotland) 2019	Group stage	3	1	0	2	2	3	Cancelled
(Georgia (country)) ~~2020~~	Cancelled due to the COVID-19 pandemic							—
(Belarus) ~~2021~~	Cancelled due to the COVID-19 pandemic							Did not qualify
(Czech Republic) 2022	Group stage	3	1	0	2	4	5	—
(Belgium) 2023	Did not qualify							Did not qualify
(Lithuania) 2024	Semi-finals	4	2	1	1	13	4	—
(Poland) 2025	Group Stage	3	1	0	2	3	6	Qualified
(Bosnia and Herzegovina) 2026	Did not qualify							Did not qualify
(Hungary) 2027	TBD							—
Total	16/22	59	23	9	27	85	76	6/12

== Current squad ==
The following 20 players were named to the squad for the second Qualifying round of the 2026 Under-19 European Championship. As part of Group A1, games were played against Latvia, Wales and Switzerland.

Head coach: Lauren Smith

No.	Pos.	Player	Date of birth (age)	Club
	GK	Sophie Jackson	18 October 2008 (age 18)	(The Football Association) Tottenham Hotspur
	GK	Amy Liddiard ^{TRN}	8 October 2008 (age 18)	(The Football Association) Arsenal
	GK	Silvana Marshall Miranda	29 August 2008 (age 18)	(The Football Association) Brighton & Hove Albion
	DF	Nelly Las	17 December 2007 (age 18)	(The Football Association) Leicester City
	DF	Sacha Lewis	28 February 2008 (age 18)	(The Football Association) Manchester City
	DF	Rachel Maltby	25 March 2007 (age 19)	(The Football Association) Aston Villa
	DF	Niamh Peacock	22 March 2008 (age 18)	(The Football Association) Arsenal
	DF	Jessica Pegram	14 April 2007 (age 19)	(Scottish Football Association) Rangers (loan)
	DF	Zara Shaw	23 December 2007 (age 18)	(The Football Association) Liverpool
	DF	Cecily Wellesley-Smith	4 January 2007 (age 19)	(The Football Association) Arsenal
	MF	Lola Brown	31 October 2007 (age 19)	(The Football Association) Crystal Palace (loan)
	MF	May Cruft	6 September 2009 (age 17)	(Scottish Football Association) Rangers
	MF	Vera Jones	18 February 2008 (age 18)	(The Football Association) Bristol City (loan)
	MF	Sienna-Rose Wareing	18 December 2007 (age 18)	(The Football Association) Manchester United
	FW	Jessica Anderson	20 March 2003 (age 23)	(The Football Association) Manchester United
	FW	Eva Hendle	30 April 2008 (age 18)	(The Football Association) Chelsea
	FW	Jhanaie Pierre	10 August 2008 (age 18)	(The Football Association) Tottenham Hotspur
	FW	Lois Shooter	6 January 2008 (age 18)	(The Football Association) Chelsea
	FW	Lauryn Thompson	4 November 2007 (age 19)	(United States Soccer Federation) Indy Eleven
TRN = Training player

=== Recent callups ===
The following players have also been called up to the England under-19 squad within the last twelve months.

Names in bold denote players who have been capped by England at under-23 or senior level. This list may be incomplete.

Pos.	Player	Date of birth (age)	Caps	Goals	Club	Latest call-up
DF	Simone Sherwood	4 January 2007 (age 19)	-	-	(England) Sheffield United (loan)	v. Latvia, 9 April 2026
DF	Sophie Harwood	25 June 2007 (age 19)	-	-	(England) Arsenal	v. Austria, 28 October 2025
DF	**Chloe Sarwie**	19 December 2008 (age 17)	-	-	(England) Chelsea	v. Austria, 28 October 2025
MF	Eva Forster	11 February 2008 (age 18)	-	-	(United States) North Carolina Courage	v. Austria, 28 October 2025
MF	Isabel Hebard	27 October 2008 (age 18)	-	-	(England) Bristol City	v. Austria, 28 October 2025
MF	**Erica Parkinson**	18 April 2008 (age 18)	-	-	(Portugal) Valadares Gaia	v. Austria, 28 October 2025
MF	Taylor Warren	30 November 2008 (age 17)	-	-	(England) Brighton & Hove Albion	v. Austria, 28 October 2025
FW	Niyah Dunbar	1 July 2007 (age 19)	-	-	(England) Sunderland	v. Austria, 28 October 2025
FW	Olivia Johnson	4 March 2007 (age 19)	-	-	(England) Bristol City (loan)	v. Austria, 28 October 2025
INJ = Withdrew due to injury; TRN = Training player

== Recent schedule and results ==
This list includes match results from the past 12 months, as well as any future matches that have been scheduled.

=== 2025 ===
20 February 2025 Friendly	Spain	2–0	England	La Nucia, Spain
11:00	Comendador 2'; Marisa 56'	Report		Stadium: Olímpic Camilo Cano

23 February 2025 Friendly	England	2–0	United States	Alicante, Spain
15:00	Brown 6'; Gale 15'	Report		Stadium: Estadio Antonio Solana

26 February 2025 Friendly	England	1–1 (5–3 p)	Netherlands	Alicante, Spain
11:00	Ademiluyi 19'	Report	van Hensbergen 69'	Stadium: Albir Garden Stadium

2 April 2025 2025 U19 Euros qualification Round 2	England	6–0	Belgium	Burton upon Trent, England
14:00	Lia 3', 25'; Baker 18' (pen.), 77'; Harbert 82'; Gale 90'	Report		Stadium: St George's Park National Football Centre; Referee: Galiya Echeva (Bulgaria)

5 April 2025 2025 U19 Euros qualification Round 2	England	5–1	Austria	Burton upon Trent, England
14:00	Baker 5'; Ward 9'; Lia 43', (yellow card) 68'; Agyemang 55'; Gale 78'; Thompson (yellow card) 83'	Report	Gutmann 13', (yellow card) 79'; Selina Albrecht (yellow card) 57'; Rapf (yellow card) 79'	Stadium: St George's Park National Football Centre; Referee: Lotta Vuorio (Finland)

8 April 2025 2025 U19 Euros qualification Round 2	England	10–0	Ukraine	Burton upon Trent, England
14:00	Brown 2', 9' (pen.), 79'; Gale 26'; Ademiluyi 33', 39', 46', 59'; Baker 46'; Reid 51'	Report		Stadium: St George's Park National Football Centre; Referee: Jelena Kumer (Croatia)

30 May 2025 Friendly	Germany	3–2	England	Frankfurt, Germany
11:00	Cox 22' (o.g.); Zimmermann 25'; Schneider 78'	Report	Ademiluyi 44'; Maltby 88' (pen.)	Stadium: DFB Campus

15 June 2025 2025 U19 Euros Group Stage	England	2–1	Netherlands	Tarnobrzeg, Poland
16:00	Ademiluyi 49'; Rademaker 54' (o.g.)	Report	Zuidberg 44'; Koopman (yellow card) 84'	Stadium: Tarnobrzeg Municipal Stadium; Attendance: 648; Referee: Fabienne Michel (Germany)

18 June 2025 2025 U19 Euros Group Stage	Portugal	4–1	England	Tarnobrzeg, Poland
16:00	Cancelinha (yellow card) 36'; Santiago 76', 89'; Marques 78'; Gago 82' (pen.)	Report	Iara Lobo 45+2' (o.g.)	Stadium: Tarnobrzeg Municipal Stadium; Attendance: 611; Referee: Kristina Georgieva (Bulgaria)

21 June 2025 2025 U19 Euros Group Stage	Spain	1–0	England	Stalowa Wola, Poland
18:00	Librán 90+6'	Report	Parkinson (yellow card) 47'; Newell (yellow card) 49'; Potter (yellow card) 78'	Stadium: Subcarpathian Football Center; Attendance: 283; Referee: Rasa Grigonė (Lithuania)

22 October 2025 2026 U19 Euros Qualification Round 1	England	6–0	Estonia	Tallinn, Estonia
16:00	Parkinson 8', 29'; Jones 37'; Cruft 54'; Thompson 63' (pen.), 78'			Stadium: Sportland Arena; Referee: Ainara Acevedo (Spain)

25 October 2025 2026 U19 Euros Qualification Round 1	England	4–0	Greece	Tallinn, Estonia
16:00	Hibbert-Johnson 18'; Platania 22' (o.g.); Parkinson 24'; Warren 85'	Report		Stadium: Sportland Arena; Referee: Alexandra Collin (France)

28 October 2025 2026 U19 Euros Qualification Round 1	Austria	1–1	England	Tallinn, Estonia
16:00	Lueger 37'	Report	Shooter 36'	Stadium: Sportland Arena

=== 2026 ===
9 April 2026 2026 U19 Euros Qualifiers Round 2	England	5–0	Latvia	Biel/Bienne, Switzerland
	Shaw 12'; Maltby (pen.), 29'; Drury 69'; Hylton 76'; Jones 89'	Report		Stadium: Tissot-Arena

12 April 2026 2026 U19 Euros Qualifiers Round 2	England	2–3	Wales	Vevey, Switzerland
	Rodgers , 24' (o.g.); Hendle 48'	Report	Cole 26'; Hill 44', 77'	Stadium: Stade de Copet

15 April 2026 2026 U19 Euros Qualifiers Round 2	Switzerland	2–0	England	Biel/Bienne, Switzerland
	Pfister 33', 75'	Report		Stadium: Tissot-Arena

7 October 2026 2027 U19 Euros Qualifiers Round 1	England	1–5	Denmark	Kakanj, Bosnia and Herzegovina
12:00	Shooter 20' (pen.)	Report	Nielsen 15'; Bischoff 30', 75'; Ludvigsen 62'; Thierry 73'	Stadium: Mladost Stadium; Referee: Lizzy Van Der Helm (The Netherlands)

10 October 2026 2027 U19 Euros Qualifiers Round 1	Switzerland	2–2	England	Zenica, Bosnia and Herzegovina
13:00	Bornemann 3'; Kott 77'	Report	Shooter 15'; Teer-Hutchins 61'	Stadium: FA Training Centre; Referee: Tatyana Sorokopudova (Kazakhstan)

13 October 2026 2027 U19 Euros Qualifiers Round 1	Bosnia and Herzegovina	0–6	England	Zenica, Bosnia and Herzegovina
12:00		Report	Oukriss 7'; Shooter 50', 89'; Peacock 72'; Anderson 74'; Hirons 76'	Stadium: FA Training Centre; Referee: Elisabet Calvo Valentín (Spain)

== Coaching staff ==
=== Current Information ===
Position	Staff	Ref.
Head Coach	John Salomon	
Assistant Coach	Sam Griffiths	
Goalkeeping Coach	Tom Pressman	

=== Managerial History ===
Name	Years active
Emma Coates	2017–2023
Amy Merricks	2023
John Griffiths	2023–24 (interim)
Lauren Smith	2024–2026-
John Salomon	2026- (interim)
