= Rachel Maltby =

English footballer (born 2007)

Personal information
- Full name: Rachel Olivia Maltby
- Date of birth: 25 March 2007 (age 19)
- Place of birth: Northamptonshire, England
- Height: 1.69 m (5 ft 7 in)
- Position: Defender

Team information
- Current team: Aston Villa
- Number: 38

Youth career
- –2025: Aston Villa

Senior career*
Years	Team	Apps	(Gls)
2025–	Aston Villa	22	(0)

International career^{‡}
2023	England U16	5	(1)
2024–2025	England U17	16	(1)
2025–	England U19	13	(1)
2025–	England U20	17	(5)
- * Club domestic league appearances and goals as of 18:53, 22 November 2026 (UTC) ‡ National team caps and goals as of 15:55, 17 September 2026 (UTC)

Rachel Olivia Maltby (born 25 March 2007) is an English professional footballer who plays as a defender for Women's Super League club Aston Villa and the England under-19 national team.

== Early life ==
Rachel Olivia Maltby was born on 25 March 2007 in Northamptonshire.

== Youth career ==
Maltby began playing football with a local boys' team, Long Buckby, at the under-six level. She later stopped playign football to pursue gymnastics and swimming, but returned to football at the under-nine age group. She then played for a Rushden & Diamonds boys' team, where she was noticed by an Aston Villa men's scout. In her youth, she played as a forward.

== Club career ==
=== Aston Villa ===
A product of the Aston Villa academy setup, Maltby signed her first professional contract with the club in March 2025. She made her senior debut for the club in April 2025, coming on as a substitute during a 5–2 win against Arsenal. Her first goal came in November 2025, a 90th minute equaliser against Birmingham City in the League Cup; Villa would go on to lose the match 3–1 on penalties.

== International career ==
Maltby has represented England at both the under-17 and under-19 age groups. Having previously played as a forward, Maltby transitioned to the left-back position during her time with the under-17 team.

In 2024, she was called up to both the UEFA Women's Under-17 Championship and the FIFA U-17 Women's World Cup (in which England finished fourth).

On 21 August 2026, Maltby was called up to represent England at the 2026 U-20 Women's World Cup. Maltby scored the equaliser in England's opening game, a 1–1 draw to Canada. During a 5–1 victory over Tanzania, she recorded a hat-trick. In doing so, she became the first English player to score a hat-trick at an U-20 Women's World Cup in eight years, following in the footsteps of Lauren Hemp in 2018. Maltby scored again in the team's 1–2 loss to Brazil, marking a goal in each group stage match. Of her four group stage goals, three were penalties: this made Maltby the first player to score three penalties in an U-20 group stage. She provided a further three assists in the group stage.

== Career statistics ==
As of match played 22 November 2026

Appearances and goals by club, season and competition
Club	Season	League			FA Cup		League Cup		Total	
Club	Season	Division	Apps	Goals	Apps	Goals	Apps	Goals	Apps	Goals
Aston Villa	2024–25	Women's Super League	2	0	—		—		2	0
Aston Villa	2025–26	Women's Super League	16	0	1	0	3	1	20	1
Aston Villa	2026–27	Women's Super League	4	0	0	0	5	0	9	0
Career total			22	0	1	0	8	1	31	1
