= 2019–20 Tottenham Hotspur F.C. Women season =

Tottenham Hotspur
2019–20 season
- Chairman: June Clarke
- Head Coaches: Karen Hills and Juan Carlos Amorós
- Stadium: The Hive
- FA WSL: 7th
- FA Cup: Quarter-final
- League Cup: Group stage
- Top goalscorer: League: Rianna Dean (4); All: Rianna Dean (10)
- Highest home attendance: 38,262 (vs. Arsenal, 17 November)
- Lowest home attendance: League: 571 (vs. Brighton & Hove Albion, 8 December); All: 205 (vs. Lewes, 11 December, League Cup)
- Average home league attendance: 6,258 as of 12 February 2020
Home colours	Away colours	Third colours

The 2019–20 Tottenham Hotspur F.C. Women season was the club's 35th season in existence but only their first as a professional team having been promoted to the FA Women's Super League, the highest level of the football pyramid, at the end of the 2018–19 season. Along with competing in the WSL, the club also contested two domestic cup competitions: the FA Cup and the League Cup.

On 13 March 2020, in line with the FA's response to the coronavirus pandemic, it was announced the season was temporarily suspended until at least 3 April 2020. After further postponements, the season was ultimately ended prematurely on 25 May 2020 with immediate effect. Tottenham sat in 6th at the time but were overtaken by Everton and finished in 7th on sporting merit after The FA Board's decision to award places on a points-per-game basis.

== Squad ==
As of 18 January 2020.

Note: Flags indicate national team as defined under FIFA eligibility rules; some limited exceptions apply. Players may hold more than one non-FIFA nationality.

No.	Pos.	Nation	Player
1	GK	ENG	Chloe Morgan
2	DF	ESP	Lucia Leon
3	DF	NZL	Ria Percival
4	MF	WAL	Josie Green
5	MF	ENG	Sophie McLean
6	MF	WAL	Anna Filbey
7	FW	ENG	Gemma Davison
8	MF	ENG	Chloe Peplow
9	FW	ENG	Rianna Dean
10	MF	ENG	Coral-Jade Haines
11	DF	ENG	Jenna Schillaci (captain)

No.	Pos.	Nation	Player
14	FW	ENG	Angela Addison
15	DF	NED	Siri Worm
16	FW	ENG	Kit Graham
17	FW	ENG	Jessica Naz
19	FW	ENG	Lucy Quinn
21	DF	SCO	Emma Mitchell (on loan from Arsenal)
22	GK	ENG	Becky Spencer
23	FW	ENG	Rosella Ayane
25	DF	ENG	Hannah Godfrey
29	DF	ENG	Ashleigh Neville

== Pre-season ==
As part of Tottenham's preseason, the team traveled to Spain to compete in the invitational Ramon de Carranza Trophy, marking the first time women's teams took part. Spurs beat Real Betis in one semi-final with Athletic Bilbao beating CD Tacón in the other. The winners met each in the final the following day with Athletic Bilbao winning on penalties. Tottenham also scheduled five domestic friendlies against English opposition with every game open to the public.

28 July 2019 Friendly	Southampton Women's F.C.	0–7	Tottenham Hotspur	Eastleigh
14:00 BST		Report	Peplow; Dean; Haines; Green; Naz	Stadium: Ten Acres

4 August 2019 Friendly	Crystal Palace	0–7	Tottenham Hotspur	Bromley
14:00 BST		Report	Dean 2', 18'; Quinn 47'; Neville 57'; Haines 74'; McLean 77'; Worm 86'	Stadium: Hayes Lane

11 August 2019 Friendly	London Bees	Cancelled	Tottenham Hotspur	Edgware
14:00 BST		Report		Stadium: The Hive

13 August 2019 Ramón de Carranza Trophy	Real Betis (Spain)	1–2	Tottenham Hotspur	Cádiz, Spain
	Cazalla 31'	Report	Quinn 27'; Graham 59'	Stadium: Estadio Ramón de Carranza; Referee: María José Villegas Navas

14 August 2019 Ramón de Carranza Trophy	Athletic Bilbao (Spain)	1–1 (a.e.t.) (5–4 p)	Tottenham Hotspur	Cádiz, Spain
	García 90+4'		Addison 11'	Stadium: Estadio Ramón de Carranza

25 August 2019 Friendly	Arsenal	6–0	Tottenham Hotspur	Borehamwood
14:00 BST	Roord 5', 64', 73'; Beattie 21'; Nobbs 50'; Miedema 59'	Report		Stadium: Meadow Park

1 September 2019 Friendly	West Ham United	1–2	Tottenham Hotspur	Romford
15:00 BST	Thomas 23'		Addison 81'; Leon 88'	Stadium: Rush Green Stadium

== FA Women's Super League ==
In response to the record viewing figures during the 2019 FIFA Women's World Cup, three fixtures were moved to Premier League grounds. These included two Spurs games: the away trip to Chelsea on the opening weekend and Tottenham's hosting of the North London derby in November. The latter saw an attendance of 38,262, setting a new FA WSL attendance record.

=== Results summary ===
Overall								Home						Away					
Pld	W	D	L	GF	GA	GD	Pts	W	D	L	GF	GA	GD	W	D	L	GF	GA	GD
15	6	2	7	15	24	−9	20	3	1	3	7	12	−5	3	1	4	8	12	−4

Last updated: 23 February 2020.
Source: FA WSL

=== Results by matchday ===
Round	1	2	3	4	5	6	7	8	9	10	11	12	13	14	15	16	17	18	19	20	21	22
Ground	A	H	A	H	A	H	A	A	H	A	H	H	A	H	A	H	H	A	A	A	H	H
Result	L	W	W	L	W	L	L	D	W	L	L	W	L	D	W	C	C	C	C	C	C	C
Position	12	6	5	8	6	6	7	7	6	7	7	5	7	7	6							

A = Away; H = Home; W = Win; D = Draw; L = Loss

=== Results ===
8 September 2019 1	Chelsea	1–0	Tottenham Hotspur	Fulham
12:30 BST	England 4'	Report	Schillaci (yellow card) 11'; Furness (yellow card) 86'	Stadium: Stamford Bridge; Attendance: 24,564; Referee: Amy Fearn

15 September 2019 2	Tottenham Hotspur	1–0	Liverpool	Edgware
14:00 BST	Furness 45+1' (pen.); Worm (yellow card) 47'	Report	Robe (yellow card) 54'; Fahey (red card) 65'; Lawley (yellow card) 84'	Stadium: The Hive; Attendance: 996; Referee: Ryan Atkin

29 September 2019 3	West Ham United	0–2	Tottenham Hotspur	Stratford
14:30 BST	Kvamme (yellow card) 83'; Dali (yellow card) 84'	Report	Dean 36'; Ayane (yellow card) 64'; Quinn 84'	Stadium: London Stadium; Attendance: 24,790; Referee: Abigail Byrne

13 October 2019 4	Tottenham Hotspur	0–3	Manchester United	Edgware
12:30 BST	Furness (yellow card) 60'; Green (yellow card) 76'	Report	Hanson 13'; Neville 52' (o.g.); James (yellow card) 81' (yellow-red card) 90+1'; Zelem (yellow card) 86'; Ross 90+2'	Stadium: The Hive; Attendance: 1,299; Referee: Kirsty Dowle

27 October 2019 5	Bristol City	1–2	Tottenham Hotspur	Filton
15:00 BST	Harrison 39'	Report	Godfrey (yellow card) 30'; Graham 63', 64'; Peplow (yellow card) 86'	Stadium: Stoke Gifford Stadium; Attendance: 639; Referee: Daniel Lamport

17 November 2019 6	Tottenham Hotspur	0–2	Arsenal	Tottenham
15:00 BST	Peplow (yellow card) 36'; Furness (yellow card) 58'; Neville (yellow card) 79'	Report	Little 66'; Miedema 82'	Stadium: Tottenham Hotspur Stadium; Attendance: 38,262; Referee: Abigail Byrne
Note: New FA WSL attendance record

24 November 2019 7	Everton	3–1	Tottenham Hotspur	Southport
12:30 BST	Pike 7'; Filbey 26' (o.g.); Morgan (yellow card) 35'; George (yellow card) 43'; Graham 56'; Kaagman (yellow card) 90+1'	Report	Quinn 19'; Green (yellow card) 23'; Leon (yellow card) 67'	Stadium: Haig Avenue; Attendance: 150; Referee: Michael Barlow

4 December 2019 8	Birmingham City	1–1	Tottenham Hotspur	Solihull
19:45 BST	Grant 22'; Scott (yellow card) 35'; Staniforth (yellow card) 76'	Report	Neville (yellow card) 30'; Graham (yellow card) 67', (goal) 73'	Stadium: Damson Park; Attendance: 304; Referee: Jane Simms

8 December 2019 9	Tottenham Hotspur	1–0	Brighton & Hove Albion	Edgware
14:00 BST	Williams 57' (o.g.); Leon (yellow card) 77'; Peplow (yellow card) 82'	Report		Stadium: The Hive; Attendance: 571; Referee: Emily Heaslip

15 December 2019 10	Reading	3–1	Tottenham Hotspur	High Wycombe
14:00 BST	Howard (yellow card) 35'; Leine (yellow card) 50'; Allen (yellow card) 55', (goal) 88'; Eikeland (yellow card) 75', (goal) 90+10'; Potter 77'	Report	Worm 52'; Dean (yellow card) 84'	Stadium: Adams Park; Attendance: 715; Referee: Stacey Pearson

5 January 2020 11	Tottenham Hotspur	1–4	Manchester City	Edgware
14:00 BST	Dean 20' (pen.); Green (yellow card) 33'	Report	Bremer 2', 27'; White 5'; Hemp 44'; Bonner (yellow card) 69'	Stadium: The Hive; Attendance: 1,056; Referee: Helen Conley

12 January 2020 12	Tottenham Hotspur	2–1	West Ham United	Edgware
14:00 BST	Green (yellow card) 17'; Mitchell 30'; Ayane (yellow card) 83'; Dean 90+6'	Report	Fisk (yellow card) 69'; Galabadaarachchi (yellow card) 82'; Flaherty (yellow card) 84'; Dali 90'	Stadium: The Hive; Attendance: 855; Referee: Oliver

19 January 2020 13	Manchester United	3–0	Tottenham Hotspur	Leigh
12:00 BST	Smith (yellow card) 45+3'; Zelem 58' (pen.), 87'; Sigsworth 65'; Toone (red card) 90+5'	Report	Godfrey (yellow card) 86'; Percival (yellow card) 90+5'	Stadium: Leigh Sports Village; Attendance: 1,846; Referee: Edward Duckworth

2 February 2020	Tottenham Hotspur	P–P	Bristol City	Edgware
14:00 BST				Stadium: The Hive
Note: Postponed due to waterlogged pitch

9 February 2020	Arsenal	P–P	Tottenham Hotspur	Borehamwood
14:00 BST				Stadium: Meadow Park
Note: All WSL games postponed due to adverse weather conditions

12 February 2020 14	Tottenham Hotspur	2–2	Everton	Edgware
19:30 BST	Percival (yellow card) 61'; Addison 68'; Ayane (red card) 77'; Mitchell 78'	Report	Kelly (yellow card) 29', (goal) 31'; Kaagman 57'; Cain (yellow card) 86'	Stadium: The Hive; Attendance: 768; Referee: Ryan Atkin

23 February 2020 15	Brighton & Hove Albion	0–1	Tottenham Hotspur	Crawley
14:00 BST	Kerkdijk (yellow card) 16'; Le Garrec (yellow card) 25' (yellow-red card) 32'; Bowman (yellow card) 85'	Report	Dean 66' (pen.)	Stadium: Broadfield Stadium; Attendance: 964; Referee: Louise Saunders

22 March 2020 16	Tottenham Hotspur	Cancelled	Birmingham City	Edgware
14:00 BST				Stadium: The Hive
Note: Cancelled due to coronavirus pandemic

29 March 2020 17	Tottenham Hotspur	Cancelled	Chelsea	Edgware
14:00 BST				Stadium: The Hive
Note: Cancelled due to coronavirus pandemic

5 April 2020 18	Liverpool	Cancelled	Tottenham Hotspur	Birkenhead
14:00 BST				Stadium: Prenton Park
Note: Cancelled due to coronavirus pandemic

26 April 2020 19	Manchester City	Cancelled	Tottenham Hotspur	Manchester
14:00 BST				Stadium: Academy Stadium
Note: Cancelled due to coronavirus pandemic

13 May 2020 20	Arsenal	Cancelled	Tottenham Hotspur	Borehamwood
19:30 BST				Stadium: Meadow Park
Note: Rescheduled from 9 February 2020. Cancelled due to coronavirus pandemic

16 May 2020 21	Tottenham Hotspur	Cancelled	Reading	Edgware
14:00 BST				Stadium: The Hive
Note: Cancelled due to coronavirus pandemic

22	Tottenham Hotspur	Cancelled	Bristol City	Edgware
				Stadium: The Hive
Note: Rescheduled from 2 February 2020. Cancelled due to coronavirus pandemic

=== League table ===
Pos	Team	Pld	W	D	L	GF	GA	GD	Pts	PPG
5	Reading	14	6	3	5	21	24	−3	21	1.50
6	Everton	14	6	1	7	21	21	0	19	1.36
7	Tottenham Hotspur	15	6	2	7	15	24	−9	20	1.33
8	West Ham United	14	5	1	8	19	34	−15	16	1.14
9	Brighton & Hove Albion	16	3	4	9	11	30	−19	13	0.81

Source: FA WSL, BBC
Rules for classification: Initially: 1) Points; 2) Goal difference; 3) Number of goals scored. After abandonment of season: 1) Points per game

== Women's FA Cup ==
As a member of the top two tiers, Tottenham entered the FA Cup in the fourth round, beating National League Division One side Barnsley in their opening fixture. A successive 5–0 Cup victory, this time over Championship team Coventry United, set up a quarter-final tie against North London derby rivals Arsenal which was picked for television by BBC. However, the match was postponed due to the coronavirus pandemic before the season was ultimately curtailed. On 24 July 2020 it was announced the 2019–20 FA Cup would resume play during the 2020–21 season starting with the quarter-final ties rescheduled for the weekend of 26/27 September 2020.

26 January 2020 Fourth round	Tottenham Hotspur	5–0	Barnsley	Edgware
13:00 GMT	Dean 20', 27' (pen.); Worm 25'; Davison 58'; Sulola 65'	Report	Turner (yellow card) 24'	Stadium: The Hive; Attendance: 621; Referee: Robert Whitton

17 February 2020 Fifth round	Coventry United	0–5	Tottenham Hotspur	Coventry
19:45 GMT		Report	Worm 19'; Dean 28' (pen.), 45' (pen.), 90'; Leon 78'	Stadium: Butts Park Arena; Attendance: 756; Referee: Emily Heaslip

15 March 2020 Quarter-final	Arsenal	P–P	Tottenham Hotspur	Borehamwood
12:30 GMT				Stadium: Meadow Park
Note: Postponed due to coronavirus pandemic

26 September 2020 Quarter-final	Arsenal	4–0	Tottenham Hotspur	Borehamwood
17:15 BST	Nobbs 72'; Evans 73', 84', 90'; van de Donk (yellow card) 76'	Report	Zadorsky (yellow card) 27'; Kennedy (yellow card) 71'	Stadium: Meadow Park; Attendance: Behind-closed-doors; Referee: Lucy Oliver
Note: Rescheduled from 15 March 2020

== FA Women's League Cup ==
=== Group stage ===
22 September 2019 Group stage	Tottenham Hotspur	0–4	Reading	Edgware
14:00 BST	Haines (yellow card) 90'; Neville (yellow card) 90'	Report	Chaplen 32', 47'; Neville 54' (o.g.); Farrow 55'; Harding (yellow card) 74'; Allen (yellow card) 81'	Stadium: The Hive; Attendance: 533; Referee: Robert Whitton

20 October 2019 Group stage	West Ham United	2–2 (2–4 p)	Tottenham Hotspur	Romford
15:00 BST	Thomas 90'; Dali 90+3'	Report	Dean 52'; Green 83'; Percival (yellow card) 90'	Stadium: Rush Green Stadium; Attendance: 749; Referee: Elizabeth Simms
	Penalties
	Flaherty (penalty missed); Baunach (penalty scored); Leon (penalty missed); Dali (penalty scored)		(penalty scored) Peplow; (penalty scored) Quinn; (penalty missed) Graham; (penalty scored) Dean; (penalty scored) Furness

3 November 2019 Group stage	Crystal Palace	0–3	Tottenham Hotspur	Bromley
14:00 GMT		Report	Filbey 6'; Graham 83'; Quinn 85'	Stadium: Hayes Lane; Attendance: 308; Referee: Simon Finnegan

20 November 2019 Group stage	Chelsea	5–1	Tottenham Hotspur	Kingston upon Thames
19:00	Wardlaw (yellow card) 25'; Spence 49'; Cuthbert 57' (pen.); England 59', 84'; Cooper 76'; Carter (yellow card) 80'	Report	Haines (yellow card) 16'; Wynne (yellow card) 64'; Ayane 78'; Neville (yellow card) 83'	Stadium: Kingsmeadow; Attendance: 1,999; Referee: Lisa Benn

11 December 2019 Group stage	Tottenham Hotspur	6–0	Lewes	Edgware
19:30 GMT	Quinn 14', 22'; Addison 34', 36', 38'; Leon 63'	Report		Stadium: The Hive; Attendance: 205; Referee: Joel Mannix

Pos	Team	Pld	W	WPEN	LPEN	L	GF	GA	GD	Pts	Qualification	CHE	REA	WHU	TOT	CRY	LEW
1	Chelsea	5	4	0	1	0	13	3	+10	13	Advance to Knock-out stage	—	1–1	2–0	5–1	—	—
2	Reading	5	3	1	0	1	14	4	+10	11	Advance to Knock-out stage	—	—	0–1	—	6–0	3–2
3	West Ham United	5	3	0	1	1	13	5	+8	10		—	—	—	2–2	7–0	3–1
4	Tottenham Hotspur	5	2	1	0	2	12	11	+1	8		—	0–4	—	—	—	6–0
5	Crystal Palace	5	1	0	0	4	3	21	−18	3		0–3	—	—	0–3	—	—
6	Lewes	5	0	0	0	5	6	17	−11	0		1–2	—	—	—	2–3	—

Updated to match(es) played on 11 December 2019. Source: thefa.com
Rules for classification: 1) Points; 2) Goal difference; 3) Number of goals scored; 4) Number of wins; 5) Head-to-head record

== Squad statistics ==
=== Appearances ===
Starting appearances are listed first, followed by substitute appearances after the + symbol where applicable. Players listed with no appearances have been in the matchday squad but only as unused substitutes.

No.	Pos	Nat	Player	Total		FA WSL		FA Cup		League Cup	
No.	Pos	Nat	Player	Apps	Goals	Apps	Goals	Apps	Goals	Apps	Goals
1	GK	(England) ENG	Chloe Morgan	8	0	1+2	0	1	0	4	0
2	DF	(Spain) ESP	Lucia Leon	13	2	2+3	0	2+1	1	5	1
3	DF	(New Zealand) NZL	Ria Percival	20	0	14	0	2	0	1+3	0
4	MF	(Wales) WAL	Josie Green	19	1	12+2	0	1+1	0	2+1	1
5	MF	(England) ENG	Sophie McLean	0	0	0	0	0	0	0	0
6	MF	(England) ENG	Anna Filbey	16	1	13	0	0	0	3	1
7	FW	(England) ENG	Gemma Davison	18	1	9+3	0	3	1	1+2	0
8	MF	(England) ENG	Chloe Peplow	19	0	10+2	0	2+1	0	4	0
9	FW	(England) ENG	Rianna Dean	19	10	13+1	4	2+1	5	1+1	1
10	MF	(England) ENG	Coral-Jade Haines	10	0	2+1	0	1+1	0	4+1	0
11	DF	(England) ENG	Jenna Schillaci	10	0	3	0	2	0	5	0
14	FW	(England) ENG	Angela Addison	13	4	2+5	1	1+2	0	3	3
15	DF	(Netherlands) NED	Siri Worm	15	3	10	1	3	2	1+1	0
16	FW	(England) ENG	Kit Graham	20	4	12+2	3	2	0	2+2	1
17	FW	(England) ENG	Jessica Naz	0	0	0	0	0	0	0	0
19	FW	(England) ENG	Lucy Quinn	22	5	5+10	2	0+3	0	3+1	3
21	DF	(Scotland) SCO	Emma Mitchell	6	2	3+1	2	2	0	0	0
22	GK	(England) ENG	Becky Spencer	17	0	14	0	2	0	1	0
23	FW	(England) ENG	Rosella Ayane	17	1	6+5	0	2	0	4	1
25	DF	(England) ENG	Hannah Godfrey	15	0	14	0	0	0	1	0
29	DF	(England) ENG	Ashleigh Neville	18	0	12+1	0	2	0	3	0
30	MF	(England) ENG	Renea Jarrett	1	0	0	0	0	0	0+1	0
31	DF	(England) ENG	Sofia Stovold	1	0	0	0	0	0	1	0
33	MF	(England) ENG	Elisha Sulola	2	1	0	0	0+1	1	1	0
Joined during 2020–21 season but competed in the postponed 2019–20 FA Cup:
3	DF	(Canada) CAN	Shelina Zadorsky	1	0	0	0	1	0	0	0
5	DF	(England) ENG	Kerys Harrop	1	0	0	0	0+1	0	0	0
18	DF	(Australia) AUS	Alanna Kennedy	1	0	0	0	1	0	0	0
Players away from the club on loan:
12	MF	(Wales) WAL	Megan Wynne	7	0	0+3	0	0	0	4	0
Players who appeared for Tottenham Hotspur but left during the season:
27	MF	(Northern Ireland) NIR	Rachel Furness	11	1	9	1	0	0	1+1	0

=== Goalscorers ===
Rank	No.	Pos.	Name	FA WSL	FA Cup	League Cup	Total
1	9	FW	(England) Rianna Dean	4	5	1	10
2	19	FW	(England) Lucy Quinn	2	0	3	5
3	14	FW	(England) Angela Addison	1	0	3	4
3	16	FW	(England) Kit Graham	3	0	1	4
5	15	DF	(Netherlands) Siri Worm	1	2	0	3
6	2	DF	(Spain) Lucia Leon	0	1	1	2
6	21	DF	(Scotland) Emma Mitchell	2	0	0	2
8	4	MF	(Wales) Josie Green	0	0	1	1
8	6	MF	(England) Anna Filbey	0	0	1	1
8	7	FW	(England) Gemma Davison	0	1	0	1
8	23	FW	(England) Rosella Ayane	0	0	1	1
8	27	MF	(Northern Ireland) Rachel Furness	1	0	0	1
8	33	MF	(England) Elisha Sulola	0	1	0	1
Own goal				1	0	0	1
Total				15	10	12	37

== Transfers ==
=== Transfers in ===
Date	Position	Nationality	Name	From	Ref.
5 July 2019	FW	(England)	Rosella Ayane	(England) Bristol City	
5 July 2019	FW	(England)	Gemma Davison	(England) Reading	
5 July 2019	MF	(England)	Chloe Peplow	(England) Brighton & Hove Albion	
5 July 2019	DF	(New Zealand)	Ria Percival	(England) West Ham United	
5 July 2019	FW	(England)	Lucy Quinn	(England) Birmingham City	
5 July 2019	GK	(England)	Becky Spencer	(England) West Ham United	
5 July 2019	DF	(Netherlands)	Siri Worm	(England) Everton	
24 July 2019	DF	(England)	Hannah Godfrey	(United States) South Alabama Jaguars	
14 August 2019	FW	(England)	Kit Graham	(England) Charlton Athletic	

=== Loans in ===
Date	Position	Nationality	Name	From	Until	Ref.
6 September 2019	MF	(Northern Ireland)	Rachel Furness	(England) Reading	28 December 2019	
3 January 2020	DF	(Scotland)	Emma Mitchell	(England) Arsenal	End of season	

=== Transfers out ===
Date	Position	Nationality	Name	To	Ref.
5 July 2019	GK	(England)	Grace Staunton	(United States) Navarro Bulldogs	
5 July 2019	DF	(England)	Anne Meiwald	(England) Watford	
5 July 2019	DF	(England)	Renée Hector	(England) Charlton Athletic	
5 July 2019	FW	(Wales)	Sarah Wiltshire	(England) Yeovil Town	
5 July 2019	FW	(England)	Bianca Baptiste	(England) Crystal Palace	
5 July 2019	MF	(England)	Wendy Martin	Retired	
5 July 2019	GK	(Wales)	Emma Gibbon	(England) Crystal Palace	
5 July 2019	MF	(England)	Maya Vio	Retired	
5 July 2019	DF	(England)	Ryah Vyse	(England) Watford	
5 July 2019	MF	(Republic of Ireland)	Emma Beckett	(England) Watford	

=== Loans out ===
Date	Position	Nationality	Name	To	Until	Ref.
18 January 2020	MF	(Wales)	Megan Wynne	(England) Bristol City	End of season	
