= 2020–21 Tottenham Hotspur F.C. Women season =

Tottenham Hotspur
2020–21 season
- Chairman: June Clarke
- Head coaches: Karen Hills & Juan Amoros (until 19 November); Rehanne Skinner (from 19 November)
- Stadium: The Hive
- FA WSL: 8th
- FA Cup: Quarter-final
- League Cup: Group stage
- Top goalscorer: League: Four players (2); All: Angela Addison and Alanna Kennedy (3)
Home colours	Away colours	Third colours

The 2020–21 Tottenham Hotspur F.C. Women season was the club's 36th season in existence and their second in the FA Women's Super League, the highest level of the football pyramid. Along with competing in the WSL, the club also contested two domestic cup competitions: the FA Cup and the League Cup.

Josie Green was appointed captain following the retirement of Jenna Schillaci.

Head coaches Karen Hills and Juan Amoros were relieved of their duties on 19 November with the club sat in 11th place in the league. Hills had been in charge of the first team since August 2009 while Spurs were playing in the then-third tier South East Combination Women's Football League. Amoros joined in February 2011. They were replaced by England assistant manager Rehanne Skinner.

== Squad ==
As of 2 February 2021.

Note: Flags indicate national team as defined under FIFA eligibility rules; some limited exceptions apply. Players may hold more than one non-FIFA nationality.

No.	Pos.	Nation	Player
1	GK	NOR	Aurora Mikalsen
3	DF	CAN	Shelina Zadorsky
4	MF	WAL	Josie Green (captain)
5	DF	ENG	Kerys Harrop
7	FW	ENG	Gemma Davison
8	MF	ENG	Chloe Peplow
9	FW	ENG	Rianna Dean
10	FW	ENG	Rachel Williams
11	MF	KOR	Cho So-hyun (on loan from West Ham United)
12	DF	NZL	Ria Percival
14	FW	ENG	Angela Addison
15	DF	NED	Siri Worm

No.	Pos.	Nation	Player
16	FW	ENG	Kit Graham
17	FW	ENG	Jessica Naz
18	DF	AUS	Alanna Kennedy
19	FW	ENG	Lucy Quinn
20	DF	ENG	Abbie McManus (on loan from Manchester United)
22	GK	ENG	Becky Spencer (vice-captain)
23	FW	ENG	Rosella Ayane
25	DF	SCO	Hannah Godfrey
29	DF	ENG	Ashleigh Neville
32	GK	ENG	Amy Martin
35	DF	WAL	Esther Morgan

== Preseason ==
16 August 2020 Friendly	Tottenham Hotspur	2–0	Sheffield United	Enfield
	Dean 28' (pen.); Neville 51'	Report		Stadium: Hotspur Way; Attendance: Behind-closed-doors

== FA Women's Super League ==
=== Results summary ===
Overall								Home						Away					
Pld	W	D	L	GF	GA	GD	Pts	W	D	L	GF	GA	GD	W	D	L	GF	GA	GD
22	5	5	12	18	41	−23	20	3	3	5	11	17	−6	2	2	7	7	24	−17

Last updated: 9 May 2021.
Source: FA WSL

=== Results by matchday ===
Round	1	2	3	4	5	6	7	8	9	10	11	12	13	14	15	16	17	18	19	20	21	22
Ground	H	A	A	H	A	H	A	H	H	H	A	A	A	H	A	A	H	H	H	A	H	A
Result	D	L	L	L	L	D	D	W	W	W	W	L	L	L	L	D	D	L	L	L	L	W
Position	7	8	8	9	9	11	11	9	8	8	7	7	7	8	8	8	8	8	8	8	8	8

A = Away; H = Home; W = Win; D = Draw; L = Loss

=== Results ===
6 September 2020 1	Tottenham Hotspur	1–1	West Ham United	Edgware
14:00 BST	Fisk 53' (o.g.)	Report	Pacheco (yellow card) 45+1'; Leon 57'	Stadium: The Hive; Attendance: Behind-closed-doors; Referee: Kirsty Dowle

13 September 2020 2	Everton	1–0	Tottenham Hotspur	Liverpool
13:00 BST	Christiansen 51'; Finnigan (yellow card) 64'; Magill (yellow card) 67'; Moe Wold (yellow card) 82'	Report	Green (yellow card) 59'; Harrop (yellow card) 77'	Stadium: Walton Hall Park; Attendance: Behind-closed-doors; Referee: Robert Mason-Ellis

4 October 2020 3	Manchester City	4–1	Tottenham Hotspur	Manchester
12:30 BST	Kelly 33', 51' (pen.); Greenwood (yellow card) 48'; Mewis 53'; White 68'	Report	Green (yellow card) 43'; Dean (yellow card) 44'; Harrop (yellow card) 63'; Filbey 80'	Stadium: Academy Stadium; Attendance: Behind-closed-doors; Referee: Stacey Pearson

10 October 2020 4	Tottenham Hotspur	0–1	Manchester United	Edgware
12:30 BST	Green (yellow card) 14'; Neville (yellow card) 59'	Report	Ladd (yellow card) 45+1'; Groenen (yellow card) 66'; M. Turner 67', (yellow card) 83'; A. Turner (yellow card) 69'	Stadium: The Hive; Attendance: Behind-closed-doors; Referee: Amy Fearn

18 October 2020 5	Arsenal	6–1	Tottenham Hotspur	Borehamwood
14:00 BST	McCabe 4', (yellow card) 75'; Miedema 7', 36', 41'; Foord 15', 64'	Report	Harrop (yellow card) 36'; Dean (yellow card) 61'; Percival (yellow card) 68'; Leon 77'	Stadium: Meadow Park; Attendance: Behind-closed-doors; Referee: Abigail Byrne

7 November 2020 6	Tottenham Hotspur	1–1	Reading	Edgware
14:00 GMT	Neville 25'; Harrop (yellow card) 63'	Report	Chaplen 13'; Rowe (yellow card) 22'	Stadium: The Hive; Attendance: Behind-closed-doors

14 November 2020 7	Bristol City	2–2	Tottenham Hotspur	Bath
18:30 GMT	Logarzo 37' (pen.); Salmon 90+2'	Report	Worm 42'; Neville 64', (yellow card) 81'; Dean (red card) 77'	Stadium: Twerton Park; Attendance: Behind-closed-doors; Referee: Lisa Benn

6 December 2020 8	Tottenham Hotspur	3–1	Brighton & Hove Albion	Edgware
14:00 GMT	Harrop 11'; Kennedy (yellow card) 32'; Addison 63'; Morgan 84' (pen.); Percival (yellow card) 90+5'	Report	Williams (yellow card) 8'; Kaagman 33' (pen.)	Stadium: The Hive; Referee: Emily Heaslip

13 December 2020 9	Tottenham Hotspur	3–1	Aston Villa	Edgware
14:00 GMT	Morgan 13' (pen.); Siems 36' (o.g.); Harrop (yellow card) 45+3'; Neville (yellow card) 61'; Ayane 63'	Report	Weiß (yellow card) 12'; Hanssen 24'	Stadium: The Hive; Referee: Sarah Garratt

20 December 2020	Chelsea	P–P	Tottenham Hotspur	Kingston upon Thames
14:00 GMT				Stadium: Kingsmeadow
Note: Game postponed following COVID-19 cases in Chelsea squad

10 January 2021 10	Tottenham Hotspur	H–W	Birmingham City	Edgware
14:00 GMT				Stadium: The Hive
Note: Postponed due to Birmingham player shortage. On 18 March 2021, an independent tribunal awarded three points to Tottenham after Birmingham were deemed to have breached Rule 11.3.18. in failing to fulfil the fixture. No scoreline was specified.

17 January 2021 11	West Ham United	0–1	Tottenham Hotspur	Dagenham
15:00 GMT	Longhurst (yellow card) 61'; Vetterlein (yellow card) 90'	Report	Quinn 35'; Dean (yellow card) 61'	Stadium: Victoria Road; Attendance: Behind-closed-doors; Referee: Lucy Oliver

24 January 2021	Tottenham Hotspur	P–P	Everton	Edgware
14:00 GMT				Stadium: The Hive
Note: Postponed due to frozen pitch and extreme weather warnings

31 January 2021 12	Chelsea	4–0	Tottenham Hotspur	Kingston upon Thames
12:30 GMT	Leupolz 27', 63' (pen.); McManus 29' (o.g.); Kerr 38'	Report		Stadium: Kingsmeadow; Attendance: Behind-closed-doors; Referee: Sarah Garratt
Note: Rescheduled from 20 December 2020 following positive COVID-19 cases in Chelsea squad

6 February 2021 13	Aston Villa	1–0	Tottenham Hotspur	Walsall
12:30 GMT	Iwabuchi 12'; N'Dow (yellow card) 90+11'	Report	Mikalsen (yellow card) 67'; Kennedy (yellow card) 85'	Stadium: Bescot Stadium; Attendance: Behind-closed-doors; Referee: Elizabeth Simms

10 February 2021	Tottenham Hotspur	P–P	Bristol City	Edgware
19:30 GMT				Stadium: The Hive
Note: Postponed due to frozen pitch

28 February 2021 14	Tottenham Hotspur	2–3	Everton	Edgware
14:00 GMT	Harrop (yellow card) 18'; Addison 35'; Davison 57'	Report	Gauvin 8' (pen.), 18' (pen.); Stringer (yellow card) 37'; Scott 61'; Clemaron (yellow card) 66'	Stadium: The Hive; Attendance: Behind-closed-doors; Referee: Abigail Byrne
Note: Rescheduled from 24 January 2021 due to frozen pitch and extreme weather warnings

7 March 2021 15	Brighton & Hove Albion	2–0	Tottenham Hotspur	Crawley
14:00 GMT	Geum-min (yellow card) 21'; Connolly (yellow card) 45+3'; Kaagman 61', 74'; Kerkdijk (yellow card) 68'	Report	Worm (yellow card) 77'	Stadium: Broadfield Stadium; Attendance: Behind-closed-doors; Referee: Stacey Pearson

14 March 2021 16	Reading	0–0	Tottenham Hotspur	Reading
12:30 GMT	Harding (yellow card) 36'	Report		Stadium: Madejski Stadium; Attendance: Behind-closed-doors; Referee: Cristiana Hattersley

21 March 2021 17	Tottenham Hotspur	1–1	Bristol City	Edgware
14:00 GMT	Worm 3', (yellow card) 27'; Cho (yellow card) 82'	Report	Evans 52'; Daniëls (yellow card) 66'	Stadium: The Hive; Attendance: Behind-closed-doors; Referee: Rebecca Welch
Note: Rescheduled from 10 February 2021 due to frozen pitch

27 March 2021 18	Tottenham Hotspur	0–3	Arsenal	Tottenham
15:30 GMT	McManus (yellow card) 22'	Report	Foord 26', (yellow card) 30'; Miedema 35'; McCabe 61'	Stadium: Tottenham Hotspur Stadium; Attendance: Behind-closed-doors; Referee: Helen Conley

4 April 2021 19	Tottenham Hotspur	0–3	Manchester City	Edgware
14:00 BST		Report	Spencer 5' (o.g.); Beckie 38'; Weir 61'	Stadium: The Hive; Attendance: Behind-closed-doors; Referee: Amy Fearn

25 April 2021 20	Manchester United	4–1	Tottenham Hotspur	Leigh
12:30 BST	Toone 9', 48' (pen.); Zelem (yellow card) 18'; Press 19'; Staniforth (yellow card) 28'; Sigsworth 31'	Report	Neville (yellow card) 39'; Green (yellow card) 50'; Kennedy 90+3'	Stadium: Leigh Sports Village; Attendance: Behind-closed-doors; Referee: Christina Hattersley

5 May 2021 21	Tottenham Hotspur	0–2	Chelsea	Edgware
17:30 BST	McManus (yellow card) 90+1'	Report	Kerr 41', 52'	Stadium: The Hive; Attendance: Behind-closed-doors; Referee: Amy Fearn

9 May 2021 22	Birmingham City	0–1	Tottenham Hotspur	Solihull
14:30 BST	Scott (yellow card) 88'	Report	Graham 71'	Stadium: Damson Park; Attendance: Behind-closed-doors; Referee: Lisa Benn

=== League table ===
Pos	Team	Pld	W	D	L	GF	GA	GD	Pts
6	Brighton & Hove Albion	22	8	3	11	21	41	−20	27
7	Reading	22	5	9	8	25	41	−16	24
8	Tottenham Hotspur	22	5	5	12	18	41	−23	20
9	West Ham United	22	3	6	13	21	39	−18	15
10	Aston Villa	22	3	6	13	15	47	−32	15

Source: FA WSL
Rules for classification: 1) Points; 2) Goal difference; 3) Number of goals scored.

== Women's FA Cup ==
As a member of the top two tiers, Tottenham will enter the FA Cup in the fourth round proper. Originally scheduled to take place on 31 January 2021, it was delayed due to COVID-19 restrictions. Due to the delay, the competition only reached the fifth round before the end of the season. It resumed at the quarter-final stage the following season on 29 September 2021.

18 April 2021 Fourth round	Reading	2–3 (a.e.t.)	Tottenham Hotspur	Reading
14:00 BST	F. Williams 12'; Rowe 49', (yellow card) 119'	Report	Kennedy 20'; R. Williams 48'; Naz 93'; Ayane (yellow card) 95'	Stadium: Madejski Stadium; Attendance: Behind-closed-doors; Referee: Lisa Benn

16 May 2021 Fifth round	Tottenham Hotspur	2–1 (a.e.t.)	Sheffield United	Edgware
14:00 BST	Quinn 30'; Graham 109'	Report	Watson 80'	Stadium: The Hive; Attendance: Behind-closed-doors; Referee: Abigail Byrne

29 September 2021 Quarter-final	Arsenal	5–1	Tottenham Hotspur	Borehamwood
19:15 BST	Iwabuchi 15'; Wubben-Moy 32'; Foord 36', 73'; Parris 44'	Report	Williams 3'	Stadium: Meadow Park; Referee: Kirsty Dowle

== FA Women's League Cup ==
7 October 2020 Group stage	Tottenham Hotspur	4–0	London City Lionesses	Edgware
15:30 BST	Percival 12'; Kennedy 29'; Ayane 35'; Godfrey (yellow card) 70'; Addison 82'	Report	Bennett (yellow card) 28'	Stadium: The Hive; Attendance: Behind-closed-doors; Referee: Sarah Garratt

3 November 2020 Group stage	Chelsea	2–0	Tottenham Hotspur	Kingston upon Thames
19:00 GMT	Fleming (yellow card) 67'; Cuthbert 70'; Leupolz 84'	Report	Neville (yellow card) 90'	Stadium: Kingsmeadow; Attendance: Behind-closed-doors; Referee: Emily Heaslip

18 November 2020 Group stage	Arsenal	2–2 (5–4 p)	Tottenham Hotspur	Borehamwood
19:30 GMT	Miedema 12'; Wälti (yellow card) 61'; Foord 71'; Mead (yellow card) 76'	Report	Ayane (yellow card) 53'; Percival 59'; Zadorsky 88'	Stadium: Meadow Park; Attendance: Behind-closed-doors; Referee: Amy Fearn
	Penalties
	McCabe (penalty scored); Wubben-Moy (penalty scored); Beattie (penalty scored); Foord (penalty scored); Wälti (penalty scored)		(penalty scored) Quinn; (penalty scored) Percival; (penalty scored) Kennedy; (penalty scored) Davison; (penalty missed) Morgan

Pos	Team	Pld	W	WPEN	LPEN	L	GF	GA	GD	Pts	Qualification	CHE	ARS	TOT	LCL
1	Chelsea	2	2	0	0	0	6	1	+5	6	Advanced to knock-out stage	—	4–1	2–0	—
2	Arsenal	3	1	1	0	1	7	6	+1	5	Possible knock-out stage based on ranking	—	—	2–2	—
3	Tottenham Hotspur	3	1	0	1	1	6	4	+2	4		—	—	—	4–0
4	London City Lionesses	2	0	0	0	2	0	8	−8	0		C–C (Note: Match originally postponed following three positive COVID-19 tests by London City Lionesses players. An independent tribunal determined the fixture would not be rescheduled as it would have no effect on qualifying.)	0–4	—	—

Source: thefa.com
Rules for classification: 1) Points; 2) Goal difference; 3) Number of goals scored; 4) Number of wins; 5) Head-to-head record

== Squad statistics ==
=== Appearances ===
As of 29 September 2021

Starting appearances are listed first, followed by substitute appearances after the + symbol where applicable. Players listed with no appearances have been in the matchday squad but only as unused substitutes.

No.	Pos	Nat	Player	Total		FA WSL		FA Cup		League Cup	
No.	Pos	Nat	Player	Apps	Goals	Apps	Goals	Apps	Goals	Apps	Goals
1	GK	(Norway) NOR	Aurora Mikalsen	5	0	5	0	0	0	0	0
3	DF	(Canada) CAN	Shelina Zadorsky	26	1	20	0	3	0	3	1
4	MF	(Wales) WAL	Josie Green	20	0	11+3	0	1+2	0	3	0
5	DF	(England) ENG	Kerys Harrop	18	1	12+2	1	1+1	0	2	0
7	FW	(England) ENG	Gemma Davison	20	1	10+6	1	0+1	0	1+2	0
8	MF	(England) ENG	Chloe Peplow	4	0	2+2	0	0	0	0	0
9	FW	(England) ENG	Rianna Dean	19	0	10+6	0	1	0	1+1	0
10	MF	(England) ENG	Rachel Williams	15	2	6+6	0	3	2	0	0
11	MF	(South Korea) KOR	Cho So-hyun	9	0	5+2	0	2	0	0	0
12	DF	(New Zealand) NZL	Ria Percival	21	2	16	0	1+1	0	3	2
14	FW	(England) ENG	Angela Addison	27	3	15+6	2	1+2	0	2+1	1
15	DF	(Netherlands) NED	Siri Worm	16	2	11+2	2	0+1	0	2	0
16	FW	(England) ENG	Kit Graham	21	2	13+4	1	2+1	1	1	0
17	FW	(England) ENG	Jessica Naz	12	1	4+6	0	2	1	0	0
18	DF	(Australia) AUS	Alanna Kennedy	23	3	18+1	1	1	1	2+1	1
19	FW	(England) ENG	Lucy Quinn	24	2	5+14	1	1+1	1	0+3	0
20	DF	(England) ENG	Abbie McManus	12	0	10	0	2	0	0	0
22	GK	(England) ENG	Becky Spencer	22	0	16	0	3	0	3	0
23	FW	(England) ENG	Rosella Ayane	24	2	10+9	1	0+3	0	2	1
25	DF	(England) ENG	Hannah Godfrey	7	0	5	0	0	0	2	0
29	DF	(England) ENG	Ashleigh Neville	18	2	12	2	2+1	0	3	0
32	GK	(England) ENG	Amy Martin	0	0	0	0	0	0	0	0
35	DF	(Wales) WAL	Esther Morgan	11	0	7+1	0	2+1	0	0	0
Joined during 2021–22 season but competed in the postponed 2020–21 FA Cup:
5	DF	(England) ENG	Molly Bartrip	1	0	0	0	1	0	0	0
9	DF	(China) CHN	Tang Jiali	1	0	0	0	1	0	0	0
13	DF	(England) ENG	Asmita Ale	1	0	0	0	1	0	0	0
18	FW	(England) ENG	Chioma Ubogagu	1	0	0	0	1	0	0	0
21	MF	(France) FRA	Maéva Clemaron	1	0	0	0	1	0	0	0
Players away from the club on loan:
2	DF	(Spain) ESP	Lucía León	10	1	2+5	1	0	0	2+1	0
6	MF	(Wales) WAL	Anna Filbey	6	1	3+2	1	0	0	0+1	0
33	MF	(England) ENG	Elisha Sulola	3	0	0+2	0	0	0	0+1	0
Players who appeared for Tottenham Hotspur but left during the season:
13	FW	(United States) USA	Alex Morgan	5	2	3+1	2	0	0	0+1	0

== Transfers ==
=== Transfers in ===
Date	Position	Nationality	Name	From	Ref.
23 July 2020	DF	(England)	Kerys Harrop	(England) Birmingham City	
24 July 2020	FW	(England)	Rachel Williams	(England) Birmingham City	
27 July 2020	GK	(Norway)	Aurora Mikalsen	(England) Manchester United	
12 September 2020	FW	(United States)	Alex Morgan	(United States) Orlando Pride	
9 October 2020	GK	(England)	Sophie Whitehouse	(United States) Santa Clara Broncos	
7 January 2021	DF	(Australia)	Alanna Kennedy	(United States) Orlando Pride	
7 January 2021	DF	(Canada)	Shelina Zadorsky	(United States) Orlando Pride	

=== Loans in ===
Date	Position	Nationality	Name	From	Until	Ref.
20 August 2020	DF	(Australia)	Alanna Kennedy	(United States) Orlando Pride	31 December 2020	
20 August 2020	DF	(Canada)	Shelina Zadorsky	(United States) Orlando Pride	31 December 2020	
21 January 2021	DF	(England)	Abbie McManus	(England) Manchester United	End of season	
29 January 2021	MF	(South Korea)	Cho So-hyun	(England) West Ham United	End of season	

=== Transfers out ===
Date	Position	Nationality	Name	To	Ref.
3 June 2020	MF	(England)	Sophie McLean	(England) London Bees	
3 June 2020	GK	(England)	Chloe Morgan	(England) Crystal Palace	
3 June 2020	MF	(England)	Coral-Jade Haines	(England) Crystal Palace	
3 June 2020	MF	(Wales)	Megan Wynne	(England) Bristol City	
26 June 2020	DF	(England)	Jenna Schillaci	Retired	
21 December 2020	FW	(United States)	Alex Morgan	(United States) Orlando Pride	
30 January 2021	GK	(England)	Sophie Whitehouse	(England) Birmingham City	

=== Loans out ===
Date	Position	Nationality	Name	To	Until	Ref.
26 January 2021	MF	(England)	Elisha Sulola	(England) Charlton Athletic	End of season	
30 January 2021	DF	(Spain)	Lucía León	(Spain) Madrid CFF	End of season	
2 February 2021	MF	(Wales)	Anna Filbey	(Scotland) Celtic	End of season	
