= Peplow (surname) =

Peplow is a surname, and may refer to:

- Billy Peplow (1885 – after 1914), English footballer
- Chloe Peplow (born 1998), English footballer
- F. J. Peplow (died 1935), English librarian and philatelist
- Ron Peplow (1935–2019), English footballer
- Steve Peplow (born 1949), English footballer

== See also ==
- Peploe
- Pepler
