= Chloe Morgan =

Chloe Morgan may refer to:

- Chloe Morgan (General Hospital), a character on General Hospital
- Chloe Morgan (footballer), English footballer for Tottenham Hotspur F.C. Women
