= Kit Graham =

English footballer (born 1995)

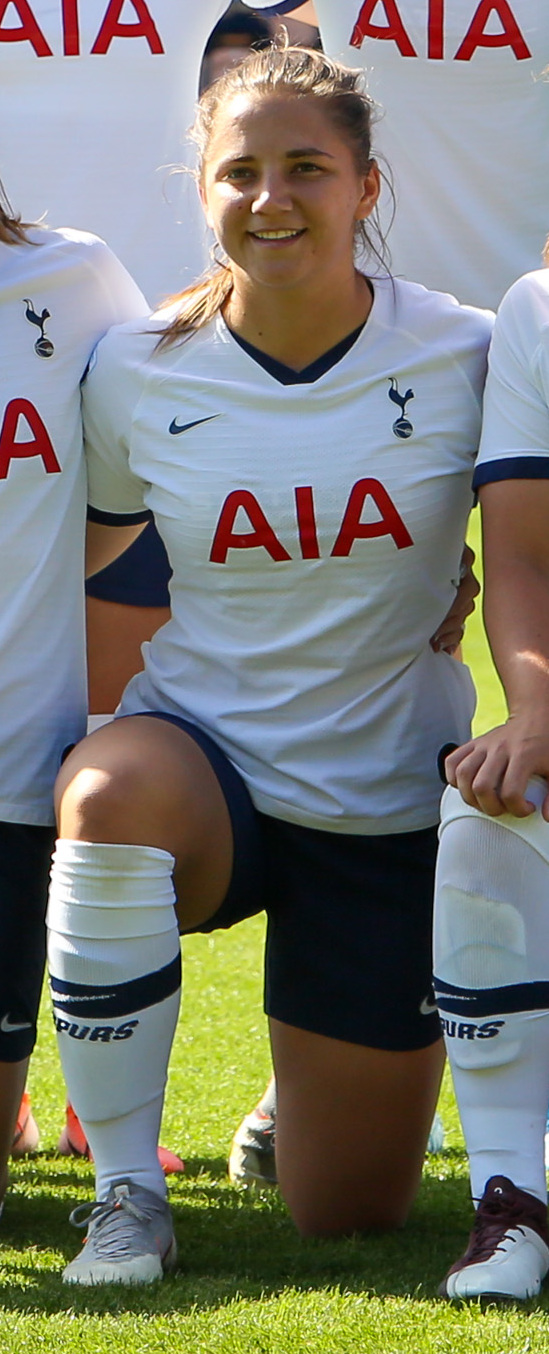
- With Tottenham Hotspur in September 2019

Personal information
- Full name: Kit Graham
- Date of birth: 11 November 1995 (age 31)
- Place of birth: Chatham, Kent, England
- Height: 1.60 m (5 ft 3 in)
- Position: Forward

Team information
- Current team: Ipswich Town

Youth career
- –2011: Charlton Athletic

Senior career*
Years	Team	Apps	(Gls)
2011–2019	Charlton Athletic	146	(122)
2019–2026	Tottenham Hotspur	55	(7)
2026	→ Ipswich Town (loan)		
2026–	Ipswich Town		
- * Club domestic league appearances and goals as of 19:33, 16 December 2023 (UTC)

Kit Graham (born 11 November 1995) is an English professional footballer who plays as a forward for Women's Super League 2 side Ipswich Town. She previously played for Charlton Athletic and Tottenham Hotspur.

== Club career ==
=== Charlton Athletic ===
Graham played for Charlton Athletic from age 9 to 23 and scored over 200 goals. During the 2017–18 season of the FA Women’s Premier League Southern Division, her 47 goals ranked first in the league as she led the team to earn promotion to the 2018–19 FA Women's Championship (FAWC). During the 2018–19 FAWC, she scored 16 goals in 19 games. She was subsequently named FAWC Players’ Player of the Year.

=== Tottenham Hotspur ===
Graham signed with Tottenham Hotspur in August 2019 despite a dispute over the terms of her previous contract at Charlton. She scored a brace against Bristol City on 27 October leading Tottenham to a 2–0 win. She was nominated for the October's PFA Fan's Player of the Month. Graham signed a new contract with Tottenham until 2021 on 8 January 2020.

In the opening game of the 2021-22 WSL season, Graham became the first Tottenham Hotspur women's player to score at the new Tottenham Hotspur Stadium. However, only a couple of months later during a match against West Ham, Graham suffered an anterior cruciate ligament (ACL) injury, leaving her unable to play for the rest of the season.

In the 2023-24 WSL, Graham made 18 league appearances for Spurs, who also reached the FA Cup final, and signed a new contract keeping her at the club until summer 2025. She suffered another setback ahead of the 2024-25 season as she sustained another ACL injury during pre-season training. Graham returned to the grass in March 2025 and returned to full training in the summer. Tottenham Hotspur extended Graham's contract by a further year in May 2025.

On 22 January 2026, it was announced that Graham had joined Women's Super League 2 club Ipswich Town on loan for the remained of the 2025-26 season, with Ipswich's technical director Sean Burt saying of the Graham's move "She will be a huge addition on the pitch with her quality and experience, and just as valuable off it, through her leadership and professionalism".

On 26 June 2026, Graham signed for Ipswich Town on a permanent deal.

== Personal life ==
Graham is married to April Bowers.

== Career statistics ==
=== Club ===
As of match played 16 December 2023

Appearances and goals by club, season and competition
Club	Season	League			FA Cup		League Cup		Total	
Club	Season	Division	Apps	Goals	Apps	Goals	Apps	Goals	Apps	Goals
Charlton Athletic	2011–12	Women's Premier League	10	2	?	?	2	1	12	3
Charlton Athletic	2012–13	Women's Premier League	17	3	?	?	6	3	23	6
Charlton Athletic	2013–14	WPL Southern	20	10	2	1	2	0	24	11
Charlton Athletic	2014–15	WPL Southern	22	31	4	4	6	10	32	45
Charlton Athletic	2015–16	WPL Southern	20	11	3	6	1	0	24	17
Charlton Athletic	2016–17	WPL Southern	19	21	3	3	6	9	28	33
Charlton Athletic	2017–18	WPL Southern	22	32	5	4	3	2	30	38
Charlton Athletic	2018–19	Championship	16	12	?	?	2	2	18	14
Charlton Athletic	Total		146	122	17	18	28	27	191	167
Tottenham Hotspur	2019–20	Women's Super League	14	3	2	0	4	1	20	4
Tottenham Hotspur	2020–21	Women's Super League	17	1	3	1	1	0	21	2
Tottenham Hotspur	2021–22	Women's Super League	8	2	0	0	2	0	10	2
Tottenham Hotspur	2022–23	Women's Super League	9	1	1	0	0	0	10	1
Tottenham Hotspur	2023–24	Women's Super League	9	0	0	0	3	2	12	2
Tottenham Hotspur	Total		57	7	6	1	10	3	73	11
Career total			203	129	23	19	38	30	264	178
