= Rosella Ayane =

Moroccan footballer (born 1996)

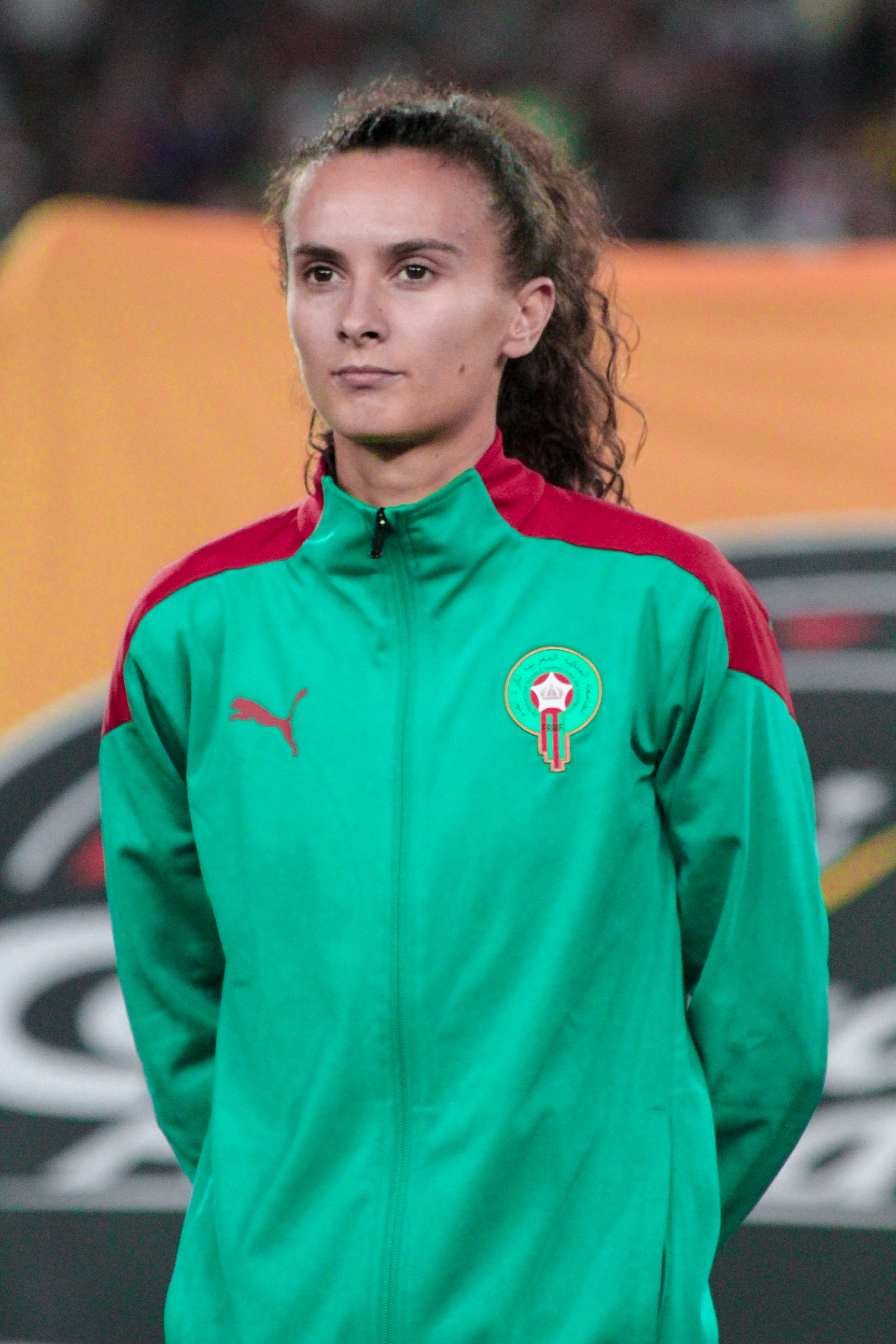
- Ayane with Morocco at the 2022 Women's Africa Cup of Nations

Personal information
- Date of birth: 16 March 1996 (age 30)
- Place of birth: Reading, England
- Height: 1.80 m (5 ft 11 in)
- Position: Forward

Team information
- Current team: Ipswich Town

Youth career
- Reading
- Chelsea

Senior career*
Years	Team	Apps	(Gls)
2013–2016	Chelsea	6	(1)
2015	→ Millwall (loan)		
2016	→ Bristol City (loan)	8	(3)
2016	→ Everton (loan)	12	(1)
2017–2018	Apollon Limassol	15	(14)
2018–2019	Bristol City	15	(1)
2019–2025	Tottenham Hotspur	95	(4)
2024	→ Chicago Red Stars (loan)	1	(0)
2025–2026	Leicester City	8	(0)
2026–	Ipswich Town	0	(0)

International career^{‡}
2011–2012	England U17	7	(1)
2014–2015	England U19	10	(2)
2021–	Morocco		
Medal record
Representing Morocco
Women's Africa Cup of Nations
Second place	2022 Morocco
- * Club domestic league appearances and goals as of 6 March 2026 (UTC) ‡ National team caps and goals as of 04:05, 7 September 2024 (UTC)

Rosella Ayane (Arabic: روزيلا أيان, pronounced [ruˈziːla ʔaˈjæːn]; born 16 March 1996) is a professional footballer who plays for Ipswich Town and also represents the Morocco national team. At club level, she has previously played for Chelsea, Bristol City, Leicester City, and Tottenham Hotspur.

Internationally, Ayane represented England at under-17 and under-19 level before being capped at senior level by Morocco.

== Early life ==
Born in Reading to a Moroccan father and a Scottish mother, Ayane attended Maiden Erlegh School.

== Club career ==
=== Chelsea ===
Ayane started her career with Chelsea after coming through the club's Centre of Excellence. She began in the youth system, in 2012 she was a part of the Chelsea U17 that won the league and cup double. She made her first-team debut in August 2013 against Doncaster Rovers Belles; Chelsea won. Three more appearances followed against Everton, Bristol City and Notts County before Ayane was selected as part of Chelsea's squad for the 2013 International Women's Club Championship, she played twice as Chelsea finished second. On 30 August, Ayane scored four goals against London Bees in the FA WSL Cup in an 8–0 victory.

==== Loan spells ====
After making four appearances in all competitions for Chelsea in 2014, Ayane was loaned out in 2015 to Millwall; a team she scored twice against for Chelsea in 2015 in the FA WSL Cup. After a few months with Millwall, she returned to her parent club. 2016 saw a loan move to Bristol City, with whom she made nine appearances and scored three goals in all competitions before returning to Chelsea after Bristol manager Willie Kirk decided against extending her loan. A few weeks after leaving Bristol, she was loaned out as Everton became her fourth career club. She scored her first Everton goal on 17 July in a 3–0 win over Yeovil Town.

=== Apollon Limassol ===
In August 2017, Ayane joined Cypriot First Division side Apollon Limassol. She scored on her debut for the club, getting the opening goal in a 4–0 home win in the first match of Group 5 in the 2017–18 UEFA Champions League qualifying round against NSA Sofia. On the second matchday, versus Noroc Nimoreni of Moldova, she scored a hat-trick in a 5–0 victory. Ayane followed that up with a goal in the final qualifying group match against Sturm Graz to help advance Apollon into the knockout phase. She netted on her league debut for Apollon on 5 November, scoring the opening goal in a 16–0 win over Champions Ypsona.

In total, she scored nineteen goals in nineteen games in all competitions in her debut season. In April 2018, she was voted into the Players' Team of the Season.

=== Bristol City ===
On 18 August 2018, Ayane completed a move to rejoin former loan club Bristol City. One goal in eighteen appearances followed across 2018–19.

=== Tottenham Hotspur ===
In July 2019, Ayane moved across the FA WSL to newly promoted Tottenham Hotspur. Her first appearance for Tottenham was against Everton as a substitute on 13 September 2020 and her first goal came in a game against Aston Villa on 13 December 2020.

In the 2023–24 FA Cup, after being down 2–0 to Sheffield United, Ayane came on as a substitute in the 66th minute. Spurs drew level, and then Ayane scored the winning goal in the 96th minute. On 14 July 2023, Ayane signed a new contract with the club until June 2025.

On 27 June 2025, Tottenham confirmed the departure of Ayane at the end of her contract. One of the teams longest serving players, the Morocco international completed 109 games, scoring 12 goals in total across all competitions.

==== Chicago Red Stars (loan) ====
On 31 August 2024, the Chicago Red Stars announced that they had signed Ayane to a loan through the end of the 2024 National Women's Soccer League season. She made her debut for the team on 20 October, in a 2–0 loss to the Washington Spirit. Ayane did not make any further appearances for the Red Stars before her loan spell expired.

=== Leicester City ===
On 4 September 2025, Ayane signed a one-year contract with fellow Women's Super League club Leicester City.

In June 2026, it was announced that Ayane would depart the club upon the expiration of her contract that month.

=== Ipswich Town ===
On 1 September 2026, Ayane joined recently promoted Women's Super League 2 side Ipswich Town on an initial one-year deal.

== International career ==
Ayane has played for England at Under-17 and Under-19 level. Between 2011 and 2012 she won seven caps and scored one goal (vs. Finland, in a 2012 UEFA U17 Championship qualifier). In 2014, Ayane made her debut for the England U19s and scored the second goal in a 2–0 win. A year later she scored her second goal for England U19s in a 2–2 draw against Norway in a 2015 UEFA U19 Championship qualifier, a match that was replayed in extraordinary circumstances after a refereeing error. In total, Ayane made 17 appearances and scored 3 goals for the U17s and U19s respectively.

Due to her Moroccan father, she was eligible to represent Morocco and made her debut in June 2021, scoring within a minute of entering the field in a 3–0 victory over Mali. Previously, she almost chose Scotland, partly due to her mother's wish for her to become a member of the Scottish squad.

Ayane took part in the 2022 Women's Africa Cup of Nations held in Morocco. She started in all six matches and scored two goals, including one in the final. She secured Morocco's place in the final, scoring the decisive penalty over Nigeria, winning them 5–4, as well as securing their first appearance at a World Cup. Morocco finished second in the final, as they were defeated 2–1 in the final against South Africa.

== Career statistics ==
=== Club ===
As of match played 20 October 2024.

Appearances and goals by club, season and competition
Club	Season	League			National Cup		League Cup		Continental		Other		Total	
Club	Season	Division	Apps	Goals	Apps	Goals	Apps	Goals	Apps	Goals	Apps	Goals	Apps	Goals
Chelsea	2013	Women's Super League	4	1	0	0	0	0	—		2 (Note: Appearance(s) in the International Women's Club Championship)	0	6	1
Chelsea	2014	Women's Super League	2	0	0	0	2	2	—		—		4	2
Chelsea	2015	Women's Super League	0	0	0	0	3	4	1 (Note: Appearance(s) in the UEFA Women's Champions League)	0	—		4	4
Chelsea	2016	Women's Super League	0	0	0	0	0	0	0	0	—		0	0
Chelsea	Total		6	1	0	0	5	6	1	0	2	0	14	7
Bristol City (loan)	2016	Women's Super League 2	8	3	1	0	0	0	—		—		9	3
Everton (loan)	2016	Women's Super League 2	12	1	0	0	1	0	—		—		13	1
Apollon Limassol	2017–18	First Division	15	14	0	0	—		4	5	—		19	19
Bristol City	2018–19	Women's Super League	15	1	0	0	3	0	—		—		18	1
Tottenham Hotspur	2019–20	Women's Super League	11	0	2	0	4	1	—		—		17	1
Tottenham Hotspur	2020–21	Women's Super League	19	1	3	0	2	1	—		—		24	2
Tottenham Hotspur	2021–22	Women's Super League	17	1	1	0	4	3	—		—		22	4
Tottenham Hotspur	2022–23	Women's Super League	19	1	2	0	3	1	—		—		24	2
Tottenham Hotspur	2023–24	Women's Super League	10	0	3	1	5	2	—		—		18	3
Tottenham Hotspur	Total		76	3	11	1	18	8	—		—		105	12
Chicago Red Stars (loan)	2024	NWSL	1	0	—		—		—		—		0	0
Career total			133	23	12	1	27	14	5	5	2	0	179	43

=== International ===
As of match played 3 June 2024

Appearances and goals by national team and year
National Team	Year	Apps	Goals
Morocco	2021	3	1
Morocco	2022	12	6
Morocco	2023	16	3
Morocco	2024	4	1
Total		35	11

Scores and results list Morocco's's goal tally first, score column indicates score after each Ayane goal.

List of international goals scored by Rosella Ayane
No.	Date	Venue	Opponent	Score	Result	Competition	Ref.
1	10 June 2021	Stade Moulay Hassan, Rabat, Morocco	Mali	1–0	3–0	Friendly	
2	22 February 2022	Hibernians Stadium, Paola, Malta	Moldova	2–0	4–0	2022 Malta International Women's Football Tournament	
3	7 April 2022	Prince Moulay Abdellah Stadium, Rabat, Morocco	Gambia	3–0	6–1	Friendly	
4	12 April 2022	Prince Moulay Abdellah Stadium, Rabat, Morocco	Ghana	1–0	2–0	Friendly	
5	12 April 2022	Prince Moulay Abdellah Stadium, Rabat, Morocco	Ghana	2–0	2–0	Friendly	
6	5 July 2022	Prince Moulay Abdellah Stadium, Rabat, Morocco	Uganda	1–0	3–1	2022 Women's Africa Cup of Nations	
7	22 July 2022	Prince Moulay Abdellah Stadium, Rabat, Morocco	South Africa	1–2	1–2	2022 Women's Africa Cup of Nations	
8	17 February 2023	Arslan Zeki Demirci Sports Complex, Antalya, Turkey	Slovakia	1–0	3–0	Friendly	
9	21 February 2023	Arslan Zeki Demirci Sports Complex, Antalya, Turkey	Bosnia and Herzegovina	1–0	2–0	Friendly	
10	27 September 2023	Stade Moulay Hassan, Rabat, Morocco	Zambia	2–6	2–6	Friendly	
11	5 April 2024	Levy Mwanawasa Stadium, Ndola, Zambia	Zambia	2–1	2–1	2024 Olympic qualifying	

== Honours ==
Chelsea

- Women's Super League: 2015
- Women's FA Cup: 2014–15

Apollon Limassol

- Cypriot Women's Super Cup : 2017

Tottenham Hotspur

- Women's FA Cup runner-up: 2023–24

Morocco

- Africa Cup of Nations runner-up: 2022

== See also ==
- List of Morocco women's international footballers
