= Peplow (disambiguation) =

Peplow is a village in Shropshire, England.

Peplow may also refer to:

- Peplow (surname)
- Peplow Hall, house in Shropshire
- Peplow railway station, station in Peplow, Shropshire, England
