= Peploe =

Peploe is a surname which is shared by:

- Samuel Peploe (bishop) (1667–1752), Bishop of Chester
- Samuel Peploe (1871–1935), Scottish Post-Impressionist painter
- Dorothy Emily Peploe, the married name of Scottish author D. E. Stevenson (1892–1973)
- Clare Peploe (1941–2021), director, screenwriter and wife of Bernardo Bertolucci
- Mark Peploe (1943–2025), British screenwriter and film director
- Chris Peploe (born 1981), English cricketer
- George Peploe, husband of actress Violet Carson
- Edward Peploe Smith (1803–1847), son of George Smith (1765–1836), British Member of Parliament, banker and director of the East India Company
- Daniel Peploe, High Sheriff of Herefordshire 1846
- Daniel Peploe, Member of Parliament for Herefordshire 1874–1880

== See also ==
- Peploe Wood
