= Chloe Peplow =

English footballer

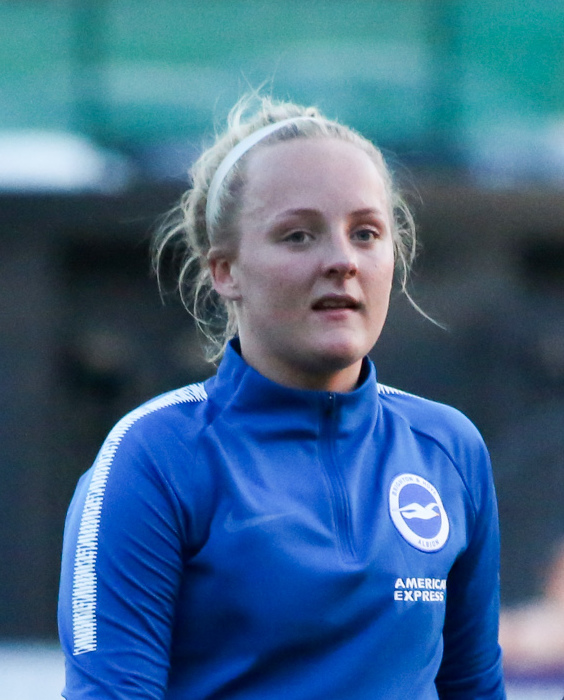
- Peplow in April 2018

Personal information
- Full name: Chloe Anne Peplow
- Date of birth: 3 December 1998 (age 27)
- Place of birth: Redditch, Worcestershire, England
- Height: 1.75 m (5 ft 9 in)
- Position: Midfielder

Team information
- Current team: Southampton
- Number: 8

Youth career
- Birmingham City

Senior career*
Years	Team	Apps	(Gls)
2015–2017	Birmingham City	18	(0)
2017	→ Doncaster Rovers Belles (Loan)	5	(0)
2017–2019	Brighton & Hove Albion	25	(1)
2019–2021	Tottenham Hotspur	16	(0)
2021–2023	Reading	13	(0)
2022–2023	→ Crystal Palace (loan)	6	(0)
2023	→ Southampton (loan)	9	(0)
2023–	Southampton	26	(1)

International career^{‡}
2013–2015	England U17	14	(0)
2016–2017	England U19	11	(0)
2017–2018	England U20	8	(0)
- * Club domestic league appearances and goals as of 14 September 2025 ‡ National team caps and goals as of 19 November 2018

Chloe Anne Peplow (born 3 December 1998) is an English football midfielder who plays for Southampton. She has represented England on the under-17 and under-19 national teams.

== Playing career ==
=== Birmingham City, 2015–2017 ===
At the age of 16, Peplow signed with Birmingham City in December 2014 for the 2015 FA WSL season. She made her debut for the senior team during a 3–0 win over Bristol City on 5 September 2015. After signing her first professional contract with the club and returning for the 2016 FA WSL season, Peplow made 13 appearances for the club. She appeared as a substitute for Andrine Hegerberg in Birmingham's 4–1 2017 FA Women's Cup Final defeat by Manchester City.

She was sent on loan to FA WSL 2 club Doncaster Rovers Belles on transfer deadline day in September 2017.

=== Tottenham Hotspur ===
After the loan spell, at Doncaster, ended, she left the club to join Super League side, Tottenham Hotspur. Throughout her two years at the club, she made twenty appearances in different competitions. She scored no goals in these appearances and in the 2021 Transfer Window, she joined the Reading Women's Team.

=== Reading ===
On 8 July 2021, Reading confirmed they had signed the midfielder for an undisclosed period.

=== Southampton ===
July 2023 Peplow signed a permanent deal with Southampton, having initially joined the club on loan earlier in the year.

June 2025 Peplow signed a new two-year contract with the club.

=== International ===
Peplow has represented England on the under-15, under-17, and under-19 national teams. She competed at the U17 and U19 European Championships.

== Personal life ==
Peplow is no longer in a long-term relationship with girlfriend Lauren Leigh.

== Career statistics ==
As of match played 3 April 2021

Appearances and goals by club, season and competition
Club	Season	League			National Cup		League Cup		Continental		Other		Total	
Club	Season	Division	Apps	Goals	Apps	Goals	Apps	Goals	Apps	Goals	Apps	Goals	Apps	Goals
Doncaster Rovers Belles	2017–18	WSL 2	5	0			2	0	—		—		7	0
Brighton & Hove Albion	2017–18	WSL 2	11	1			0	0	-		-		11	1
Brighton & Hove Albion	2018–19	FA Women's Super League	16	0	1	0	2	0	-		-		19	0
Brighton & Hove Albion	Total		27	1	1	0	2	0	-	-	-	-	30	1
Tottenham Hotspur	2019–20	FA Women's Super League	12	0	3	0	4	0	-		-		19	0
Tottenham Hotspur	2020–21	FA Women's Super League	4	0	0	0	2	0	-		-		6	0
Tottenham Hotspur	Total		16	0	3	0	6	0	-	-	-	-	25	0
Reading	2021–22	FA Women's Super League	12	0	0	0	3	0	—		—		15	0
Career total			60	1	4	0	13	0	-	-	-	-	77	1

== Honours ==
England U20s

- FIFA U-20 Women's World Cup third place: 2018

Birmingham City

- FA WSL Cup runner-up: 2016
- FA Women's Cup runner-up: 2017
