= Rianna Dean =

English footballer (born 1998)

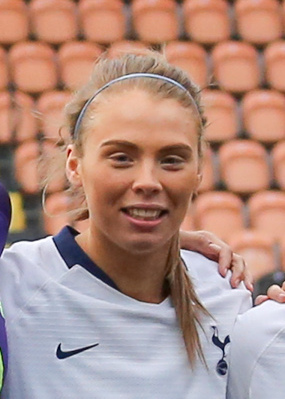
- Dean with Tottenham Hotspur in 2019

Personal information
- Full name: Rianna Dean
- Date of birth: 21 October 1998 (age 28)
- Place of birth: Uxbridge, England
- Position: Forward

Team information
- Current team: Ipswich Town
- Number: 9

Youth career
- Arsenal

Senior career*
Years	Team	Apps	(Gls)
2015–2017	Arsenal	0	(0)
2017–2018	Millwall Lionesses	17	(6)
2018–2021	Tottenham Hotspur	49	(18)
2021–2022	Liverpool	3	(2)
2022–2023	Crystal Palace	11	(2)
2023–2025	Southampton	18	(9)
2025–2026	Ipswich Town	20	(5)
2026–	Fulham	0	(0)

International career^{‡}
2015–2017	England U17	3	(0)
2017	England U19	4	(4)
2019–2020	England U21	8	(4)
- * Club domestic league appearances and goals as of 03:41, 13 December 2024 (UTC) ‡ National team caps and goals as of 26 March 2023

Rianna Dean (born 21 October 1998) is an English professional footballer who plays as a forward for Fulham.

She previously played for Arsenal, Millwall Lionesses, Tottenham Hotspur, Liverpool, Crystal Palace, Southampton, and for England at youth level.

== Club career ==
=== Arsenal ===
Dean came through the academy at Arsenal, scoring 37 goals in 20 games in the 2016/17 season with the Development Squad before confirming she was to leave at the end of the campaign in order to seek first team football. She made one senior appearance for the club, making her professional debut on 29 July 2015 in a WSL Cup Group Stage victory over London Bees. Arsenal would go on to lift the trophy.

=== Millwall Lionesses ===
In July 2017, Dean joined Millwall on a one-year contract. She led the team in goals, scoring 10 across all competitions.

=== Tottenham Hotspur ===
Upon the conclusion of her year at Millwall, Dean moved to Tottenham Hotspur for the 2018–19 season. After scoring six goals in three games, including a hat-trick against her former club, Millwall, Dean was voted FA Women's Championship October Player of the Month. She finished the season as the Championship's joint second highest scorer behind only Jessica Sigsworth of Manchester United as Tottenham won promotion to the FA WSL. Dean was one of 11 players retained by the club ahead of their debut season as a top flight professional team. She was released at the end of the 2020–21 season having not scored during her final campaign with the team.

=== Liverpool ===
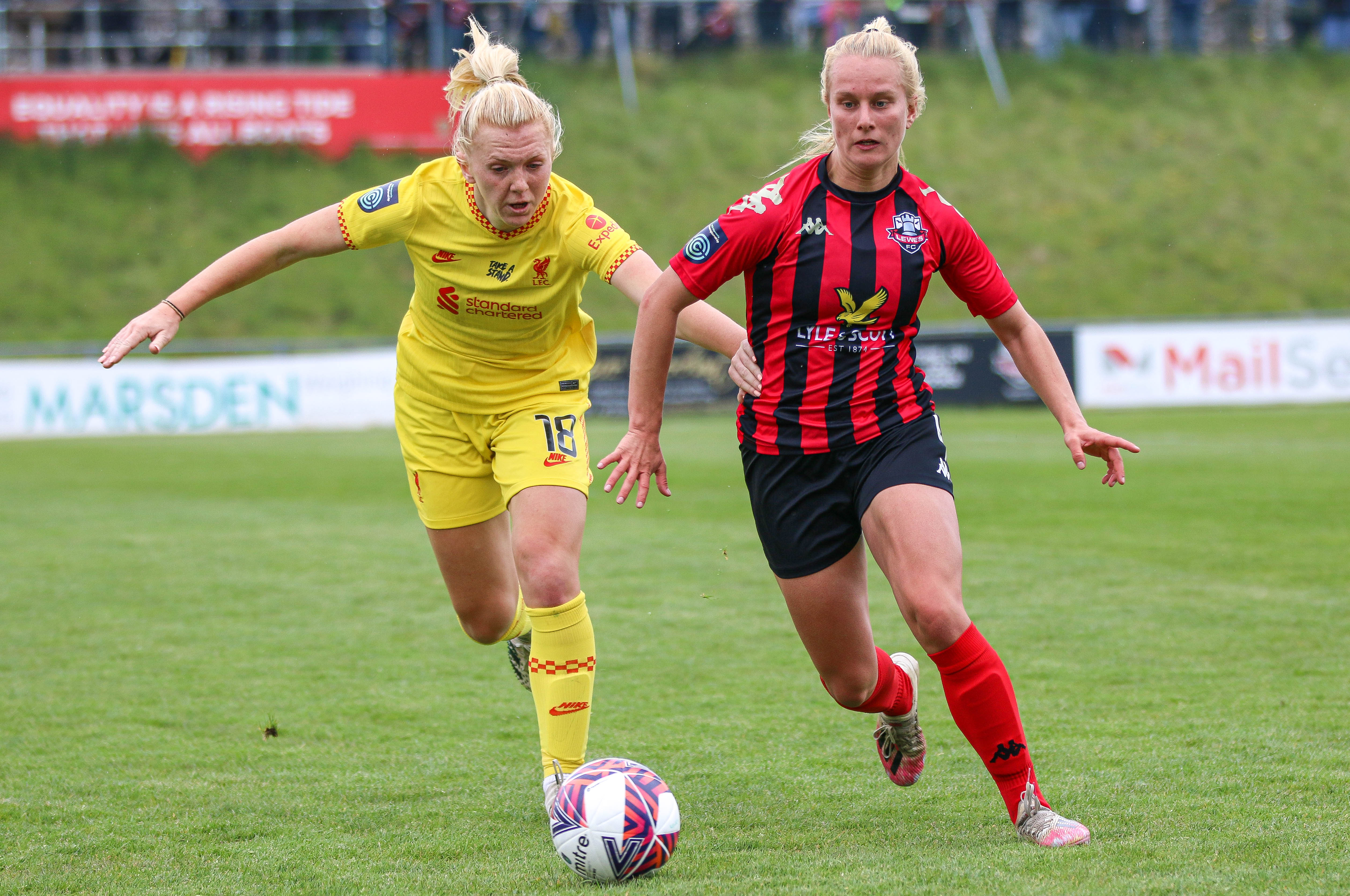
Dean (left) playing for Liverpool against Lewes, May 2022

On 9 July 2021, Dean signed for Liverpool in the FA Women's Championship. Having moved to Merseyside, she scored twice in her opening three games. However, in September 2021, she aggravated the tendon under her foot, an injury that ruled her out for the entire season.

=== Crystal Palace ===
Dean left Liverpool after a long term injury to gain minutes after being out for the whole season. Her debut for Palace was delayed by the continuing long-term injury, but she returned to scoring form approximately eighteen months after her last competitive goals for Liverpool, with a strike against Birmingham.

=== Southampton ===
It was announced in July 2023 that Dean had signed to play for Southampton ahead of their second season in the FA Women's Championship.

=== Ipswich Town ===
On 22 July 2025, Dean was announced at Ipswich Town on a permanent transfer.

On 30 July 2026, Dean was announced at Fulham.

== International career ==
Dean has been capped by England at various youth levels.

In 2015, she represented England at the 2015 UEFA Women's Under-17 Championship. In 2017, she scored twice during a 2017 UEFA Women's Under-19 Championship qualification win over the Czech Republic. In 2019, she was called up by Mo Marley to the U21 squad for the La Manga Tournament.

== Career statistics ==
=== Club ===
As of match played 3 November 2024

Appearances and goals by club, season and competition
Club	Season	League			FA Cup (Note: Includes the Women's FA Cup)		League Cup< (Note: Includes the Women's League Cup)		Total	
Club	Season	Division	Apps	Goals	Apps	Goals	Apps	Goals	Apps	Goals
Arsenal	2015	Women's Super League	0	0	0	0	1	0	1	0
Arsenal	2016	Women's Super League	0	0	0	0	0	0	0	0
Arsenal	2017	Women's Super League	0	0	0	0	0	0	0	0
Arsenal	Total		0	0	0	0	1	0	1	0
Millwall Lionesses	2017–18	Women's Super League 2	17	6	2	3	4	1	23	10
Tottenham Hotspur	2018–19	Women's Championship	19	14	1	0	5	2	25	16
Tottenham Hotspur	2019–20	Women's Super League	14	4	3	5	2	1	19	10
Tottenham Hotspur	2020–21	Women's Super League	16	0	1	0	2	0	19	0
Tottenham Hotspur	Total		49	18	5	5	9	3	63	26
Liverpool	2021–22	Women's Championship	3	2	0	0	0	0	3	2
Crystal Palace	2022–23	Women's Championship	11	2	0	0	0	0	11	2
Southampton	2023–24	Women's Championship	11	4	1	0	2	0	14	4
Southampton	2024–25	Women's Championship	7	5	0	0	1	0	8	5
Southampton	Total		18	9	1	0	3	0	22	9
Career total			98	37	8	8	17	4	123	49

== Honours ==
Arsenal

- FA WSL Cup: 2015

Liverpool FC

- FA Women's Championship: 2021–22
