= Anna Filbey =

Wales international footballer

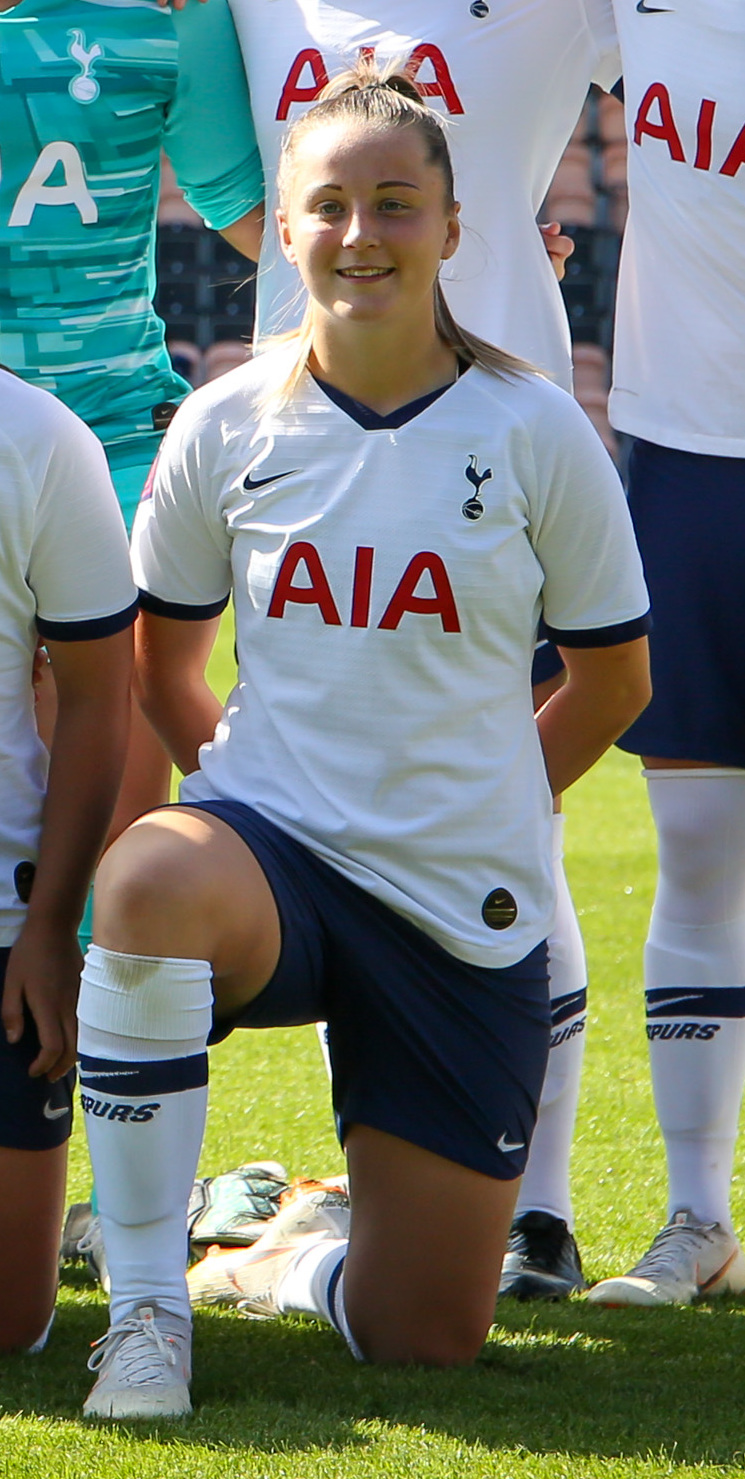
- With Tottenham Hotspur in September 2019

Personal information
- Full name: Anna Marie Filbey
- Date of birth: 11 October 1999 (age 27)
- Place of birth: Hillingdon, England
- Height: 1.67 m (5 ft 6 in)
- Positions: Defensive midfielder; defender

Team information
- Current team: Watford
- Number: 4

Youth career
- Arsenal

Senior career*
Years	Team	Apps	(Gls)
2017–2018	Arsenal	2	(0)
2018–2021	Tottenham Hotspur	40	(3)
2021	→ Celtic (loan)	12	(10)
2021–2022	Charlton Athletic	22	(1)
2022–2024	Crystal Palace	36	(2)
2024-	Watford	20	(4)

International career^{‡}
2014–2016	England U17	12	(4)
2017	England U19	2	(2)
2019–	Wales	7	(0)
- * Club domestic league appearances and goals as of 30 May 2025 ‡ National team caps and goals as of 1 May 2023

Anna Marie Filbey (born 11 October 1999) is a footballer who plays as a midfielder for Watford in the FA Women's National League South and the Wales national team. She was described by Tottenham as a "brave and technically-gifted defensive midfielder".

== Club career ==
On 11 February 2018, Filbey made her debut for Arsenal, coming on in the 80th minute, replacing Emma Mitchell in a 4–0 Arsenal win over Yeovil Town in the 2017–18 season.

That proved to be her only league appearance with the club as she joined Tottenham Hotspur on 1 August.

In February 2021 she joined Scottish Women's Premier League club Celtic on loan until the end of the 2020–21 season.

FIlbey was part of the Crystal Palace squad that earned promotion to the Women's Super League for the first time, before joining Watford in the summer of 2024.

Her first goal for the Golden Girls came in the 2-0 win over Cheltenham Town at Grosvenor Vale.

== International career ==
Filbey has represented England at the youth level for the U17 and the U19 team. On 20 September 2018, Filbey received a call up for the Welsh national team, but was later forced to pull out due to injury.

She made her senior international debut for Wales on 8 October 2019, starting a 1–0 UEFA Women's Euro 2021 qualifying away win over Belarus.

Filbey earned a recall to the Wales squad in October 2024, and was involved again in November of that year as the side qualified for their first-ever major tournament.
