= Elisha Sulola =

English footballer (born 2001)

Personal information
- Full name: Elisha Mary Sulola
- Date of birth: 7 June 2001 (age 25)
- Place of birth: London, England
- Height: 1.70 m (5 ft 7 in)
- Position: Central midfielder

Team information
- Current team: Napoli
- Number: 77

Youth career
- 2013–2020: Tottenham Hotspur

Senior career*
Years	Team	Apps	(Gls)
2019–2021	Tottenham Hotspur	2	(0)
2021	→ Charlton Athletic (loan)	11	(1)
2021–2022	Charlton Athletic	11	(2)
2023	Valadares Gaia	9	(1)
2023–2024	Valencia	15	(0)
2024–2025	Sporting Huelva	23	(1)
2025–2026	OFI	24	(6)
2026–	Napoli	0	(0)
- * Club domestic league appearances and goals as of 4 June 2026

Elisha Mary Sulola (born 7 June 2001) is an English professional footballer who plays as a central midfielder for Serie A club Napoli. Sulola also holds Nigerian citizenship through descent.

She has previously played for Tottenham Hotspur, Charlton Athletic, Valadares Gaia, Valencia, Sporting Huelva and OFI.

== Club career ==
On 26 August 2026, Sulola signed a two-year contract with Serie A club Napoli.
