= Pepler =

Pepler is a surname. Notable people with the surname include:

- Conrad Pepler (1908-1993), British priest
- Debra Pepler, Canadian psychologist
- George Pepler (1882–1959), British town planner
- Hilary Douglas Clark Pepler (1878–1951), British printer, writer and poet
- Marian Pepler (1904–1997), British architect and textile designer
- Tina Pepler, British dramatist

== See also ==
- George P. Norton (1858–1939), British accountant
