= Hannah Godfrey =

Scottish footballer (born 1997)

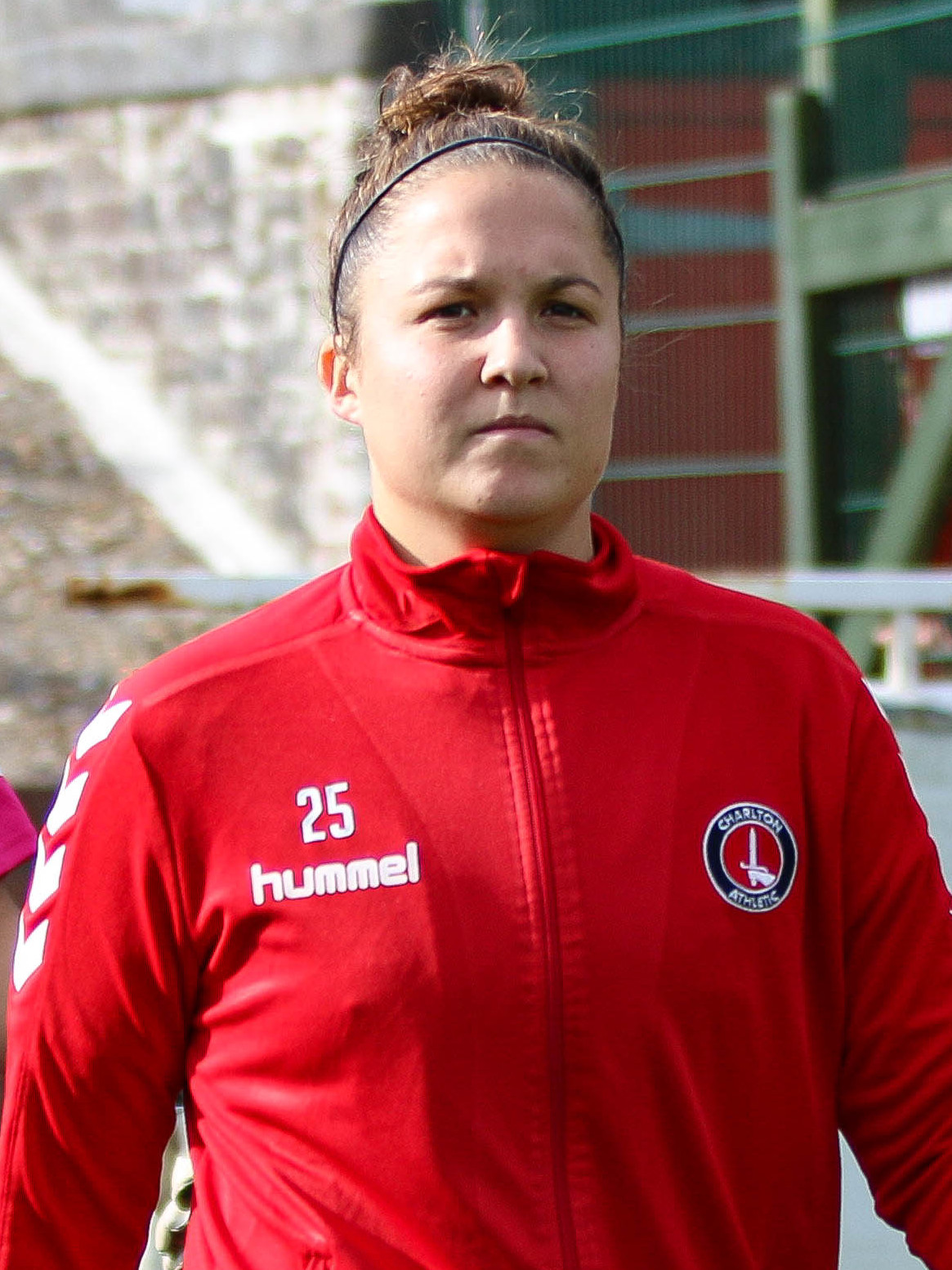
- Godfrey with Charlton Athletic in October 2021

Personal information
- Full name: Hannah Christine Godfrey
- Date of birth: 17 July 1997 (age 29)
- Place of birth: Thornton-Cleveleys, England
- Height: 5 ft 7 in (1.70 m)
- Position: Central defender

Team information
- Current team: Lewes
- Number: 25

Youth career
- Thornton-Cleveleys FC
- Blackburn Rovers
- 2014–2015: Manchester City

College career
Years	Team	Apps	(Gls)
2015–2018	South Alabama Jaguars	81	(7)

Senior career*
Years	Team	Apps	(Gls)
2013–2014	Blackburn Rovers	1	(0)
2016–2019	Pensacola FC	0	(0)
2019–2021	Tottenham Hotspur	19	(0)
2021–2023	Charlton Athletic	18	(0)
2023–	Lewes	33	(5)

International career^{‡}
2019–2020	Scotland	4	(1)
- * Club domestic league appearances and goals as of 19 August 2025 ‡ National team caps and goals as of 29 April 2025

Hannah Christine Godfrey (born 17 July 1997) is a former professional footballer who played as a defender for FA Women's Championship club Lewes.

== Career ==
She has previously played for Blackburn Rovers, Manchester City's academy team, the South Alabama Jaguars and Pensacola FC, and joined Tottenham in July 2019. Godfrey made her international debut for Scotland on 8 November 2019, scoring in a 5–0 win over Albania. She was eligible to represent Scotland as her mother was born near Glasgow.

Godfrey was released by Tottenham on 25 May 2021.

== Career statistics ==
=== International appearances ===
As of match played on 23 October 2020

National team	Year	Apps	Goals
Scotland	2019	1	1
Scotland	2020	3	0
Total		4	1

=== International goals ===
As of 23vOctober 2020. Scores and results list Scotland's goal tally first.

International goals by date, venue, cap, opponent, score, result and competition
No.	Date	Venue	Cap	Opponent	Score	Result	Competition	Ref
1	8 November 2019	Elbasan Arena, Elbasan, Albania	1	Albania	4–0	5–0	UEFA Women's Euro 2021 qualification	
