= Peploe Wood =

Peploe Wood is an English name combination shared by the brothers:

- Thomas Peploe Wood (1817–1845)
- Samuel Peploe Wood (1827–1873)

It does not appear to be a full-fledged double-barelled surname, as they signed their works "T. P. Wood" and "S. P. Wood", and Samuel's wife was known as "Amelia Wood", not "Amelia Peploe Wood".
