= Josie Green =

Wales international footballer

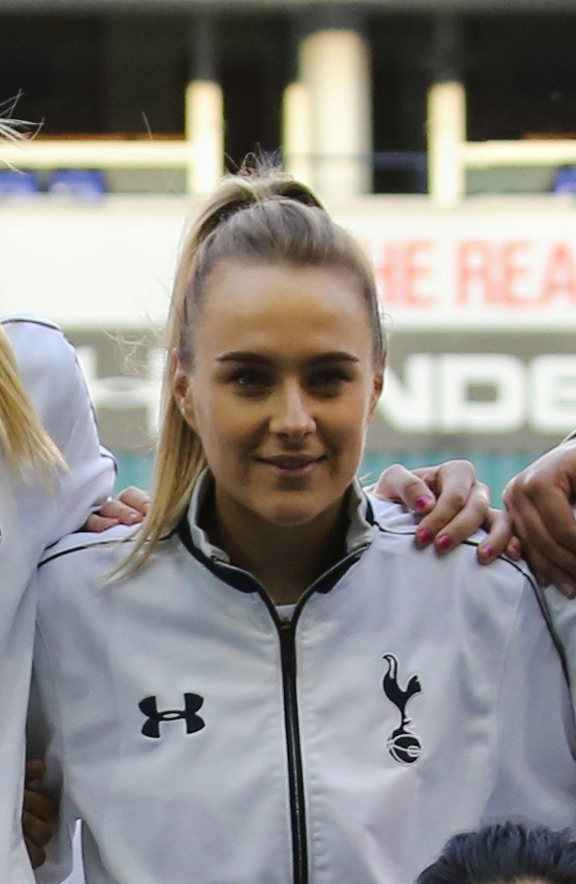
- Josie Green in April 2017

Personal information
- Full name: Josephine Alice Green
- Date of birth: 25 April 1993 (age 33)
- Place of birth: Hemel Hempstead, England
- Height: 1.56 m (5 ft 1 in)
- Position: Midfielder

Team information
- Current team: Crystal Palace
- Number: 14

Youth career
- Watford

Senior career*
Years	Team	Apps	(Gls)
2010–2016	Watford	43	(0)
2016–2022	Tottenham Hotspur	51	(3)
2022–2024	Leicester City	31	(1)
2024–	Crystal Palace	17	(0)

International career^{‡}
2010–2011	Wales U19	6	(4)
2010–	Wales	42	(0)
- * Club domestic league appearances and goals as of 28 May 2025 ‡ National team caps and goals as of 13 July 2025

Josephine Alice Green (born 25 April 1993) is a professional footballer who plays for Crystal Palace in the Women's Super League. Born in England, she plays for the Wales national team.

== Early life ==
Green was born in Hemel Hempstead, on 25 April 1993, to parents Clive and Liz.

== Club career ==
=== Watford ===
Green started her career at Watford F.C. Ladies and made her first appearance during the 2010/11 FA Women's National League season. In February 2016 she left 2nd division Watford for 3rd division Tottenham Hotspur and featured for her new club in the second half of their 2015–16 season. Green stated years later that she left Watford for Spurs due to not enjoying football at that point in her playing career.

=== Tottenham Hotspur ===
Green's first full season with Spurs was one of their most successful, with Spurs winning a quadruple including promotion to the semi-professional FA Women's Super League 2. She continued to feature in a majority of matches for the team in the following seasons including starting in 15 out of 20 matches in the 2018–19 FA Women's Championship season at the end of which Spurs won promotion to the top flight and fully professional FA Women's Super League. Josie signed her first professional contract with Spurs prior to the club's inaugural 2019–20 FA WSL and in June 2020 re-signed with the club through 2022. In August 2020, prior to Spurs' second top flight season, Green was named as the team's new captain after the retirement of longtime captain Jenna Schillaci. Green had served as vice-captain during the 2019–20 WSL season.

== International career ==
Green was born in England, but she qualifies for Wales internationally through her grandfather, who was born in Pontypool, Monmouthshire.

Her first senior cap came on 21 August 2010 when she used as a substitute in a 2011 Women's World Cup qualification match vs Azerbaijan She was only 16 at the time of the match and so her appearances shifted to the Wales U19 squad through 2011 and she returned for a stint with the senior national team in 2014. After 2014 she declined call ups in order to spend more time with her family, most notably her father who was dealing with illness. She was brought back into the senior team fold for an October 2018 training camp and on 29 August 2019, Green earned her first cap in five years in a UEFA Women's Euro 2022 qualifying match vs Faroe Islands.

In June 2025, Green was named in Wales' squad for UEFA Women's Euro 2025.

She currently has 39 caps for Cymru.

=== International appearances ===
As of matches played 3 June 2025. Statistics from the Football Association of Wales

Appearances and goals by national team and year
National team	Year	Apps	Goals
Wales	Prior to 2015	11	0
Wales	2019	3	0
Wales	2020	4	0
Wales	2021	3	0
Wales	2022	2	0
Wales	2023	5	0
Wales	2024	6	0
Wales	2025	9	0
Total		42	0

== Honours ==
Tottenham Hotspur

- FA Women's Premier League: Championship Play-off Winner: 2016–17
- FA Women's Premier League Southern Division: 2016–17

== Personal life ==
Josie’s hobbies and passions outside of football include yoga, setting up her own yoga businesses for athletes, general wellness, sustainability in fashion & football and food/cooking. Josie is also passionate about supporting and raising awareness for pancreatic cancer research.
