= Chloe Morgan (footballer) =

English footballer

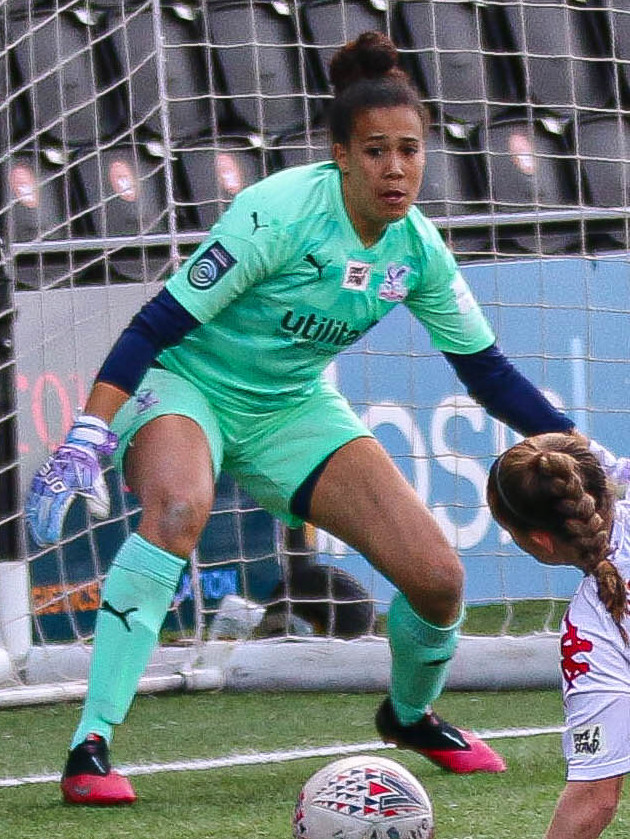
- Morgan in 2021 with Crystal Palace

Personal information
- Date of birth: 19 December 1989 (age 36)
- Place of birth: Leytonstone, England
- Height: 1.72 m (5 ft 8 in)
- Position: Goalkeeper

Senior career*
Years	Team	Apps	(Gls)
- Leyton Ladies
- Leyton Orient
–2014	Tottenham Hotspur		
2014–2015	Arsenal	0	(0)
2015–2020	Tottenham Hotspur	32	(0)
2020–2022	Crystal Palace	21	(0)
- * Club domestic league appearances and goals as of 12 July 2020 (UTC) ‡ National team caps and goals as of 15:54, 26 December 2019 (UTC)

Chloe Morgan (born 12 December 1989) is an English lawyer, journalist and former footballer who last played as a goalkeeper for FA Women's Championship club Crystal Palace.

== Early life ==
Morgan is from Leytonstone in the London Borough of Waltham Forest. She enjoyed football as a child and played recreationally for local clubs including Leyton Orient. As a youngster, the film Erin Brockovich inspired her to become a personal injury lawyer. Morgan studied law at Leeds University. After qualifying as a solicitory she got a training contract at a law firm in Essex before joining Irwin Mitchell as a civil litigation lawyer.

== Club career ==
Despite having played football since she was 7 years old, Morgan's first experience of playing as a goalkeeper was as an adult, when the regular keeper for her grassroots team was injured and Morgan offered to take her place. The following year she trialled for Tottenham Hotspur as a goalkeeper.

Morgan progressed to playing for Tottenham in the FA Women's Premier League Southern Division. During the 2013–14 season, local rivals Arsenal required a goalkeeper for their reserve team and loaned Morgan from Spurs. With Arsenal, she won the 2014 FA WSL Development Cup and made 16 reserve team appearances in 2014–15.

In 2019, Morgan was among 11 of Spurs' existing players to be offered a full-time professional contract to remain with the club following their promotion to the FA Women's Super League. She was allowed to take a sabbatical from her legal career to focus on football.

Morgan started 18 of 20 league games in the 2018–19 FA Women's Championship campaign, in which Spurs finished as runners-up to Manchester United. After leaving the club Morgan was critical of Tottenham Hotspur's treatment of its women's team during her time there.

After her contract with Tottenham expired in 2020, Morgan signed with Crystal Palace. She announced her retirement from football after the conclusion of the 2021–22 FA Women's Championship .

== After football ==
Morgan combined her football career with a full-time job as a personal injury lawyer. While playing for Crystal Palace she also served as a coach and diversity and inclusion officer for Goal Diggers F.C., a London-based amateur club for women and non-binary people. She also worked as a coach for the M-Power programme for goalkeepers in women's football and was an ambassador for KickOff@3, an initiative aiming to build relationships between young people and the police.

Morgan is a co-presenter on the woman's football podcast Upfront alongside Rachel O'Sullivan, co-founder of the Girls On The Ball platform. She was previously the first women's football editor at The Athletic. In 2024, Morgan became head of She's a Baller, an independent women's football publisher and creative agency.

In 2025, Morgan's 2017 Tottenham Hotspur shirt was added to the Football Heritage Collection at the National Football Museum in Manchester.

== Personal life ==
Morgan is openly gay and has been a vocal advocate for LGBTQ representation in the football industry. She has also spoken out about BAME representation in sports. Her work raising awareness of black inclusion and LGBTQ representation in women's football led to her being included in the Football Black List in 2020, and named as Sports Star of the Year at the 2021 Diva Awards. In 2022 she became a founding member of the LGBTQ+ Professionals in Football collective.
