= Coral-Jade Haines =

English footballer

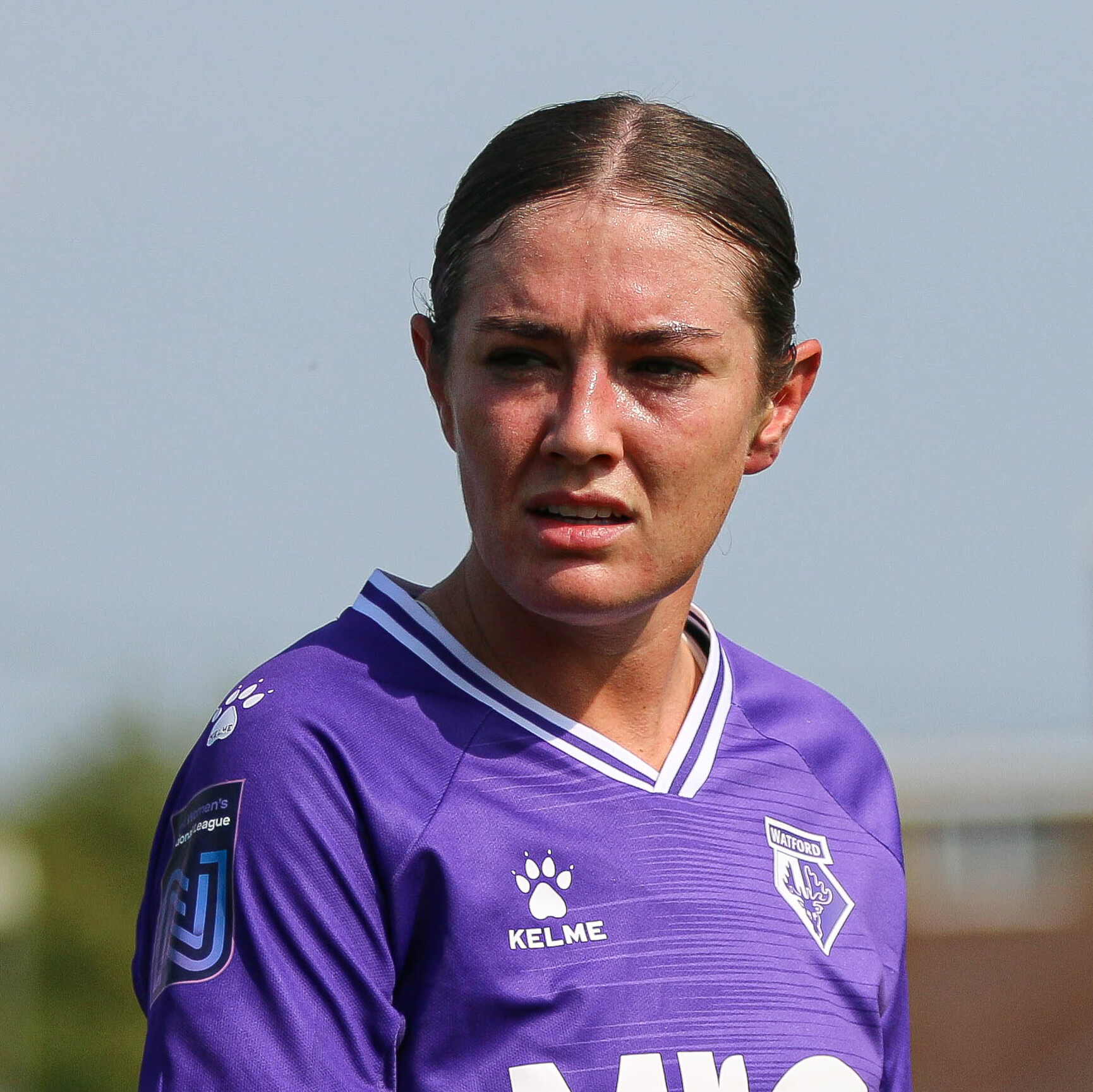
- Haines in 2024

Personal information
- Full name: Coral-Jade Haines
- Date of birth: 21 June 1996 (age 30)
- Place of birth: Leicester, England
- Positions: Midfielder; forward

Team information
- Current team: Watford
- Number: 23

Youth career
- Birmingham City

Senior career*
Years	Team	Apps	(Gls)
2013–2018	Birmingham City	17	(2)
2017–2018	→ Tottenham Hotspur (loan)	17	(4)
2018–2020	Tottenham Hotspur	21	(1)
2020–2023	Crystal Palace	59	(15)
2023–	Watford	82	(24)

International career^{‡}
2013–2014	England U19	9	(0)
- * Club domestic league appearances and goals as of 18:59, 4 June 2026 (UTC) ‡ National team caps and goals as of 18:59, 4 June 2026 (UTC)

Coral-Jade Haines (born 21 June 1996) is an English footballer who plays for Watford.

== Club career ==
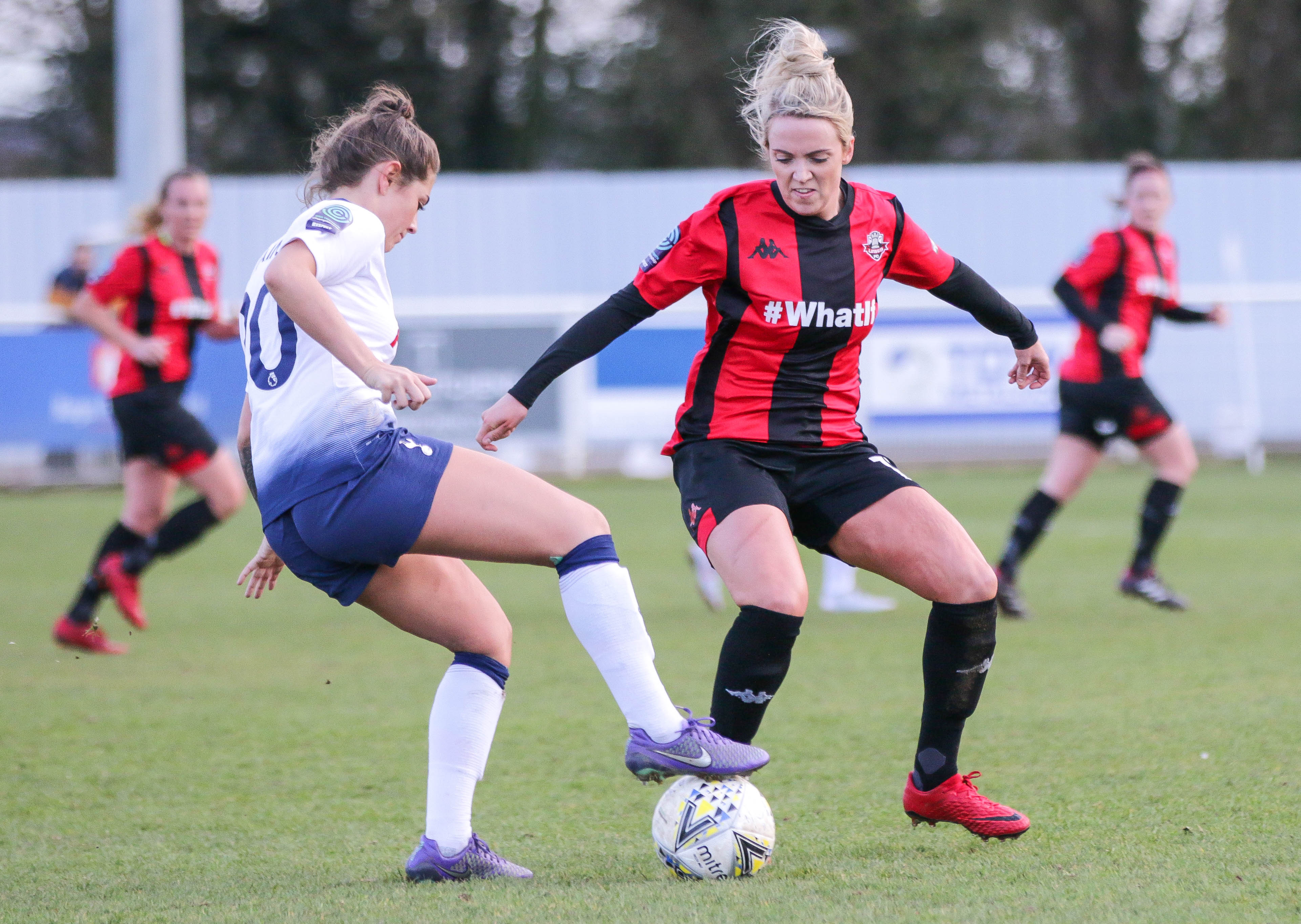
Haines (left) challenged by Bergin of Lewes F.C. on 13 January 2019

=== Birmingham City ===
After advancing through Birmingham's Centre of Excellence, Haines made her debut for Birmingham City in 2013 at the age of 16. She scored her first goal for the team in September of the same year.

On 16 October 2013, at the age of 17, Haines played in a match against PK-35 Vantaa in the 2013–14 UEFA Women's Champions League. Birmingham defeated PK-35 Vantaa 1–0 and advanced to the Round of 16.

In April 2015, Haines scored a goal against Manchester City in the quarterfinal match of the 2014–15 FA Women's Cup; Birmingham lost the match with a performance manager David Parker described as "heartless" and that of a "pub team".

=== Tottenham Hotspur ===
In September 2017, Haines joined Women's Super League club Tottenham Hotspur on loan until the end of the 2017–18 season. In July 2018, she permanently signed with Spurs.

=== Crystal Palace ===
On 3 August 2020, Haines signed for FA Women's Championship (now known as Women's Super League 2) club Crystal Palace ahead of the 2020–21 season. She left Palace in July 2023 "to pursue a new challenge".

=== Watford ===
Following her departure from Crystal Palace, Haines joined Watford ahead of the club's return to the Championship. In the 2023–24 season, Watford finished at the bottom of the league and were relegated to the Women's National League Southern Premier Division.

Watford won the Southern Premier Division in the 2025–26 season and will be promoted to the WSL 2 for the 2026–27 season; Haines scored in Watford's 3–1 win over Gwalia that secured the league title. She was named Player of the Season for her performance across the campaign.

== International career ==
Haines represented England women's national under-19 team. She made her debut for the team in October 2013.
