= Jenna Schillaci =

English association football player

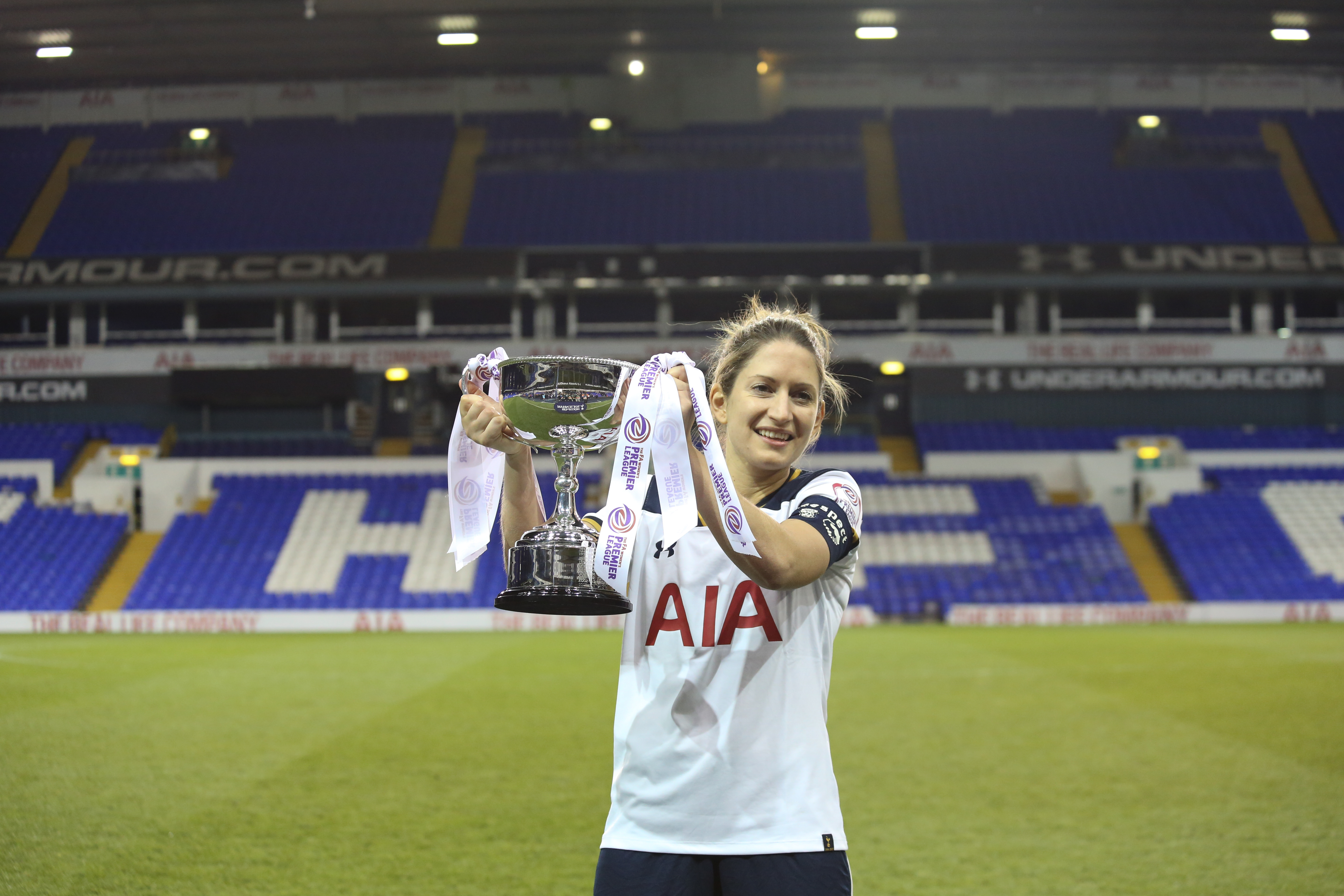
- Schillaci at White Hart Lane in 2017

Personal information
- Date of birth: 21 March 1984 (age 42)
- Place of birth: Enfield, England
- Height: 1.60 m (5 ft 3 in)
- Position: Defender

Senior career*
Years	Team	Apps	(Gls)
2000–2001	Tottenham Hotspur		
2001–2004	Queens Park Rangers		
2004–2007	Langford		
2007–2009	Enfield Town		
2009–2020	Tottenham Hotspur		
- * Club domestic league appearances and goals as of 00:25, 31 September 2019 (UTC) ‡ National team caps and goals as of 11:36, 14 September 2019 (UTC)

Jenna Schillaci (born 21 March 1984) is an English former professional footballer. Primarily a defender, she played for and captained Tottenham Hotspur during their rise from the lower divisions to the FA Women's Super League.

== Club career ==
Schillaci is from the London Borough of Enfield in north London, England. She grew up in a family of Tottenham Hotspur F.C. supporters and played football with her brothers during her childhood. As a 16-year-old she joined Tottenham Hotspur Ladies and immediately went into the first team, playing in the Greater London Women's Football League and FA Women's Cup.

After one season, Schillaci left Tottenham Hotspur. She moved to play for Queens Park Rangers and later Langford, then Enfield Town. She returned to Tottenham in summer 2009.

As a utility player, Schillaci featured in midfield or at full back for Spurs. After several seasons, she deputised as a central defender and remained permanently in the role after that. She was particularly proud to captain Spurs to the 2016–17 FA Women's Premier League Southern Division title, secured by beating West Ham at her beloved White Hart Lane.

In 2019 Schillaci was among 11 of Spurs' existing players to be offered a full-time professional contract to remain with the club following their promotion to the FA Women's Super League. Reflecting on the progress made since her humble beginnings at the club, she described the development as: "amazing, a dream come true".

Schillaci made her top division debut in Spurs' 1–0 defeat by Chelsea, played before 24,564 spectators at Stamford Bridge. After the match, she told reporters: "We're not in this league to make up the numbers". The 2019–20 FA WSL season was curtailed due to the coronavirus pandemic, and 36-year-old Schillaci announced her playing retirement in June 2020.
