= Tottenham Hotspur F.C. Women =

Tottenham Hotspur Women
- Full name: Tottenham Hotspur Football Club Women
- Nickname: The Lilywhites
- Short name: Spurs
- Founded: 1985; 41 years ago as Broxbourne Ladies
- Ground: Brisbane Road; Tottenham Hotspur Stadium (selected matches)
- Capacity: 9,271 (Brisbane Road); 62,850 (Tottenham Hotspur Stadium)
- Coordinates: 51°33′37″N 0°0′45″W; Brisbane Road
- Owner: ENIC International Ltd. (85.55%)
- Non-executive chairman: Peter Charrington
- Head coach: Martin Ho
- League: Women's Super League
- 2025–26: WSL, 5th of 12
- Website: tottenhamhotspur.com/women
Home colours	Away colours	Third colours

Tottenham Hotspur Football Club Women, commonly referred to as Tottenham (/ˈtɒtənəm/ TOT-ən-əm) or Spurs, is an English women's football club affiliated with Tottenham Hotspur. The club currently compete in the Women's Super League (WSL), the top flight of women's football in England. The club gained promotion to the WSL after finishing second in the 2018–19 FA Women's Championship.

Tottenham Hotspur play its home games at Brisbane Road in Leyton, and occasionally at the Tottenham Hotspur Stadium. The club has been training full-time at Hotspur Way since 2020.

The club has won twelve titles, the most recent being the overall FA Women's Premier League in the 2016–17 season.

== History ==
=== Early years and amateur era (1985–2017) ===
In 1985, the club was founded as Broxbourne Ladies by Sue Sharples and Kay Lovelock, following the folding of East Herts College. Permission was obtained to change the club's name to Tottenham Hotspur Ladies F.C. in the 1991–92 season. The reserve team started in 1992–93. In the 1996–97 season, the club's teams started playing in the national division. In the 2015–16 season, the club completed a historic double as they won the Ryman's Women's Cup and the FA Women's Premier League Cup. In the same season they finished runners up in the Capital Cup nearly completing a cup treble. The following season was the team's most successful, claiming the quadruple including winning promotion to the WSL 2.

=== Promotion campaigns (2017–2019) ===
At the start of the 2017–18 campaign, the club made high-profile signings such as former England U20 midfielder Coral-Jade Haines and Wales international forward Sarah Wiltshire. The season saw the team claim their first ever victory over a top flight side, beating Bristol City in their FA Women's League Cup matchup. The club finished their first season in a professional league in seventh place out of ten sides. In March 2018, it was confirmed that the club would apply to remain in the newly re-branded Women's Championship and would compete in the upcoming season. There were several moves in made the lead up to their first season in the newly reformed Championship, this included the return of Welsh international Megan Wynne who played on loan for the club in 2015 as well as the departure of long time players Katie O’Leary and Shannon Moloney who played for the side for five and seven years respectively. The club announced on 26 April 2019, that the team would be renamed to Tottenham Hotspur Women starting with the next season as well as the appointment of Heather Cowan as Head of Women's Football. After a 1–1 draw with Aston Villa on 1 May 2019, Spurs secured a promotion spot to the FA Women's Super League for the first time in their history. Their licence for the top flight was officially confirmed on 10 May 2019.

=== Women's Super League and professionalisation (2019–present) ===
On 17 November 2019, the North London derby against Arsenal at the Tottenham Hotspur Stadium recorded an attendance figure of 38,262, the highest ever for a Women's Super League match at the time.

In the 2020 summer transfer window Spurs reinforced their squad with a mix of players with WSL and NWSL experience. On 12 September, 2020, United States women's national team forward Alex Morgan signed with Spurs on a contract that reportedly ran from September through December 2020, with an option to extend the deal through the end of the 2020–21 FA WSL season. Still trying to regain fitness having not played since August 2019 and giving birth in May 2020, Morgan eventually made her Spurs debut nearly two months after signing, on 7 November, appearing as a 69th minute substitute in a 1–1 WSL draw against Reading. Spurs had started the season winless in their first seven matches, just one spot above last place and relegation. Due to this form, Rehanne Skinner was appointed as the new head coach of Tottenham on 19 November 2020, replacing long time managers Karen Hills and Juan Amorós. Hills had been in charge of the first team since August 2009 while Spurs were playing in the then-third tier South East Combination Women's Football League and Amoros joined the club soon after in February 2011. On 6 December 2020 in Skinner's first match in charge, Spurs took their first league win of the season with a 3–1 victory over Brighton & Hove Albion. The match also featured Morgan's first goal for the club, an 84th-minute penalty. On 21 December, Tottenham Hotspur announced that Morgan would end her contract with the club and return to the US. Spurs would finish the season in 8th place, well clear of relegation and just a place under their initial WSL finish in the 2019–20 FA WSL season.

Skinner's first full season in charge of Spurs would see the team reach new heights and accomplish team firsts. Spurs' second match of the 2021–22 season on 12 September saw them beat Manchester City for the first time in team history. The defeat was City's first at home in the WSL since April 2018. The win resulted in Spurs taking points from any member of the "top four," the other three sides being Arsenal, Chelsea, and Manchester United. That November Spurs would take their first ever point from Manchester United and Arsenal after drawing 1–1 against both sides in consecutive matches. Spurs had not taken any points against United since the teams first faced off in the 2018–19 FA Women's Championship season. Spurs' League Cup campaign saw them advance out of the group stage for the first time. Spurs would beat Liverpool in the quarter-finals to advance to their first ever semi-final in any major cup competition, but would bow out after a loss to eventual champions Manchester City. Spurs finished the season in 5th place, their highest ever WSL finish in club history. Following the end of the season Spurs confirmed the departures of Rachel Williams, Angela Addison, and Josie Green. The trio had each joined the club at a different level of the pyramid, Williams in the first division WSL, Addison in the second division Championship, and former captain Green was the last player who featured in the third division, joining the team ahead of Spurs' quadruple and promotion winning 2016–17 FA Women's Premier League season.

On 4 January 2023, Tottenham Hotspur broke the WSL record for highest transfer fee paid when England international Bethany England arrived from Chelsea on a contract until June 2026. On 7 July 2023, the club appointed Robert Vilahamn as head coach of Tottenham Hotspur. Martin Ho was appointed as his replacement on 4 July 2025.

== Kit ==
=== Kit suppliers and shirt sponsors ===
Period	Kit manufacturer	Shirt sponsor (chest)	Shirt sponsor (sleeve)
1985–1991	None	None	None
1991–1995	Umbro	Holsten	None
1995–1999	Pony	HP	None
1999–2002	Adidas	Holsten	None
2002–2006	Kappa	Thomson Holidays	None
2006–2010	Puma	Mansion.com Casino & Poker	None
2010–2011	Puma	Autonomy Corporation	None
2011–2012	Puma	Aurasma	None
2012–2013	Under Armour	Aurasma	None
2013–2014	Under Armour	HP	None
2014–2017	Under Armour	AIA	None
2017–2021	Nike	AIA	None
2021–2024	Nike	AIA	Cinch
2024–present	Nike	AIA	Kraken

== Stadium ==
Tottenham Hotspur Ladies moved home grounds to Cheshunt in 2016, moving from Barrows Farm Stadium, the home of Harlow Town F.C. However, the alternative first team stadium stayed the same, as Goffs Lane. On 5 June 2019, the club announced that their 2019–20 season home matches will be played at The Hive Stadium. On 6 June 2022, the club announced that their 2022–23 season home matches would be played at Brisbane Road.

The women's team have had matches at both White Hart Lane and Tottenham Hotspur Stadium. Their final match at White Hart Lane on 19 April 2017 saw them win the FA Women's Premier League South title against rivals West Ham United Ladies.

== Training ground ==
The women's team began training full-time at Hotspur Way, the club's main facilities, in December 2020. The women's team had previously trained there once a week, with the rest of the time spent at The Hive Stadium.

A separate training ground for the women's team is planned to be built in leased land in Whitewebbs Park in Enfield. It will have 11 pitches, a new women's academy as well as a new clubhouse.

== Social responsibility ==
Tottenham Hotspur Women work closely with Tottenham Hotspur Men, such as when supporting CoppaFeel!, a breast cancer awareness charity, and when promoting the Stonewall (charity) Rainbow Laces campaign.

== Players ==
=== Current squad ===
As of 2 September 2026

Note: Flags indicate national team as defined under FIFA eligibility rules; some limited exceptions apply. Players may hold more than one non-FIFA nationality.

No.	Pos.	Nation	Player
1	GK	NED	Lize Kop
3	DF	ENG	Ella Morris
4	DF	NED	Caitlin Dijkstra
5	DF	FRA	Alice Sombath
6	DF	SWE	Amanda Nildén
7	FW	ENG	Jessica Naz
8	MF	NOR	Signe Gaupset
9	FW	NOR	Cathinka Tandberg
10	MF	ESP	Maite Oroz
11	MF	DEN	Olivia Holdt
12	GK	NOR	Selma Panengstuen
13	FW	SWE	Matilda Vinberg
14	FW	SWE	Matilda Nildén

No.	Pos.	Nation	Player
15	DF	AUS	Clare Hunt
16	FW	SCO	Kirsty Hanson
18	FW	ENG	Lenna Gunning-Williams
19	FW	GER	Shekiera Martinez
20	MF	FIN	Olga Ahtinen
22	DF	SWE	Hanna Wijk
23	MF	NED	Victoria Pelova
24	MF	JAM	Drew Spence (captain)
25	MF	FIN	Eveliina Summanen
32	DF	JPN	Tōko Koga
37	FW	ENG	Jhanaie Pierre
41	MF	NOR	Julie Blakstad

==== Out on loan ====
Note: Flags indicate national team as defined under FIFA eligibility rules; some limited exceptions apply. Players may hold more than one non-FIFA nationality.

No.	Pos.	Nation	Player
30	FW	ENG	Araya Dennis (at Leicester City until 30 June 2027)

=== Club Hall of Fame ===
On 4 September 2026, the club announced it had re-launched the Hall of Fame in conjunction with the Fan Advisory Board after a hiatus since 2017, and there would be a new Hall of Fame wall installation near the players' tunnel. It is intended that the annual inductees will include a women’s player or manager from any era. The first woman to be inducted into the Hall Of Fame was Jenna Schillaci on 6 September 2026. The following players have been inducted into the club's Hall of Fame.

- (England) Jenna Schillaci

== Academy ==
Tottenham Hotspur Women also runs a football academy in partnership with Barnet and Southgate College for girls aged 16–19.

The Football Association launched the FA WSL Academy programme in 2018 for Under-21 teams, to provide a pathway to the First Team for talented players. These Under-21 teams played in the WSL Academy fixtures North & South. In 2023, the FA introduced Professional Game Academies for girls under-15 to under-21 to replace the WSL academies. Ahead of the 2025–26 campaign, Tottenham Hotspur reclassified its Women's Under-21s as Under-19s. Despite this reclassification, the team continued to play against other clubs' Under-21 sides in the PGA Under-21's League (U21 League South).

== Coaching and support staff ==
As of 19 November 2026

Position	Name
Director of football operations	(United States) Rafi Moersen
Director of women's football	(Norway) Kim Pedersen*
Head coach	(England) Martin Ho
Assistant coach	(England) Lawrence Shamieh
First-team coach	(England) Adam Jeffrey
Goalkeeping coach	(England) Ian Willcock
Performance director	Dan Lewindon
Women's director of performance and operations	Hannah Sheridan
Women's growth director	Lucy Button

*With effect from 7 December 2026

=== Head coaching history ===
Name	From	Until	Duration
(England) Karen Hills^{[a]}	16 August 2009	19 November 2020	11 years, 95 days
(Spain) Juan Carlos Amorós^{[a]}	15 February 2011	19 November 2020	9 years, 278 days
(England) Rehanne Skinner	19 November 2020	13 March 2023	2 years, 114 days
(England) Vicky Jepson (interim)	13 March 2023	7 July 2023	116 days
(Sweden) Robert Vilahamn	7 July 2023	8 June 2025	1 year, 336 days
(England) Martin Ho	4 July 2025	—	1 year, 139 days

Notes:

^{a} Part of a joint head coaching team

== List of Tottenham Hotspur F.C. Women seasons ==
=== Key ===
Key to league competitions:

- Women's Super League (WSL) – England's top women's football league, established in 2011.
- FA Women's Premier League National Division (Prem) – the former first tier of English women's football until the inception of the WSL in 2011.
- FA Women's Premier League Southern Division (Prem South) – the former second tier of English women's football, along with the Northern Division.
- South East Counties League (South East League) – the former third tier of English women's football between 1998 and 2011.
- Greater London Women's Football League (Greater London) – an amateur competitive competition based in Greater London.

Key to colours and symbols:

1st or W	Winners
2nd or RU	Runners-up
↑	Promoted
↓	Relegated

Key to league record:

- Pos = Final position
- P = Games played
- W = Games won
- D = Games drawn
- L = Games lost
- F = Goals for
- A = Goals against
- Pts = Points
- Pos = Position

Key to cup record:

- En-dash (–) = Did not participate
- Group = Group stage
- R1 = First round
- R2 = Second round, etc.
- R32 = Round of 32
- R16 = Round of 16
- QF = Quarter-finals
- SF = Semi-finals
- RU = Runners-up
- W = Winners

=== Seasons ===
Season	League									FA Cup	League Cup	International / Other		Top goalscorer(s)	
Season	Division	Pld	W	D	L	GF	GA	Pts	Pos	FA Cup	League Cup	International / Other		Player(s)	Goals
1991–92												Middlesex Country Cup	RU		
1992–93															
1993–94															
1994–95	Greater London Prem								2nd						
1995–96	Greater London Prem								2nd			Greater London League Cup	W		
1996–97	Greater London Prem								2nd						
1997–98	↑ Greater London D1								1st						
1998–99												Greater London League Cup	RU		
1999–2000															
2000–01	Greater London Prem								2nd						
2001–02															
2002–03															
2003–04												Greater London League Cup	RU		
2004–05															
2005–06	London & South East League	22	4	9	9			21	8th	QR1					
2006–07	London & South East League	20	3	5	12			14	9th	PRL					
2007–08	↑ London & South East League	20	14	2	4			44	1st	QR2					
2008–09	South East Comb League									R2					
2009–10	South East Comb League									R1					
2010–11	↑ South East Comb League								1st	R2					
2011–12	Prem South	18	6	4	8	28	29	22	6th	R3		London County Senior Cup	W		
2011–12	Prem South	18	6	4	8	28	29	22	6th	R3		FA Women's Premier League Cup	GS		
2012–13	Prem South	17	4	4	9	22	33	16	8th	R3		FA Women's Premier League Cup	GS		
2013–14	Prem South	20	6	4	10			22	8th	R2		FA Women's Premier League Cup	GS		
2013–14	Prem South	20	6	4	10			22	8th	R2		Ryman Women's Cup	RU		
2014–15	Prem South	22	12	3	7			39	5th	R5		FA Women's Premier League Cup	R1		
2015–16	Prem South	20	15	1	4	44	27	46	6th	R4		Ryman Women's Cup	W		
2016–17	↑ Prem South	20	17	1	2	58	13	52	1st (Note: Promoted via play-offs.)	R5		FA Women's Premier League Cup	W		
2016–17	↑ Prem South	20	17	1	2	58	13	52	1st	R5		Ryman Women's Cup	W		
2016–17	↑ Prem South	20	17	1	2	58	13	52	1st	R5		Capital Women's Cup	RU		
2017–18	WSL 2	20	15	1	4	44	27	46	7th	R4	GS				
2018–19	↑ Champ	20	17	1	2	58	13	52	2nd	R5	GS				
2019–20	WSL	15	6	2	7	15	24	20	7th	QF	GS			Rianna Dean	10
2020–21	WSL	22	5	5	12	18	41	20	8th	QF	GS			Angela Addison Alanna Kennedy	3
2021–22	WSL	22	9	5	8	24	23	32	5th	R4	SF			Angela Addison Rachel Williams	6
2022–23	WSL	22	5	3	14	31	47	18	9th	R5	QF			Bethany England	13
2023–24	WSL	22	8	7	7	31	36	31	6th	RU	QF			Martha Thomas	10
2024–25	WSL	22	5	5	12	26	44	20	11th	R4	QF			Bethany England	8
2025–26	WSL	22	11	3	8	35	38	36	5th	QF	QF			Olivia Holdt	10

== Honours ==
=== First team ===
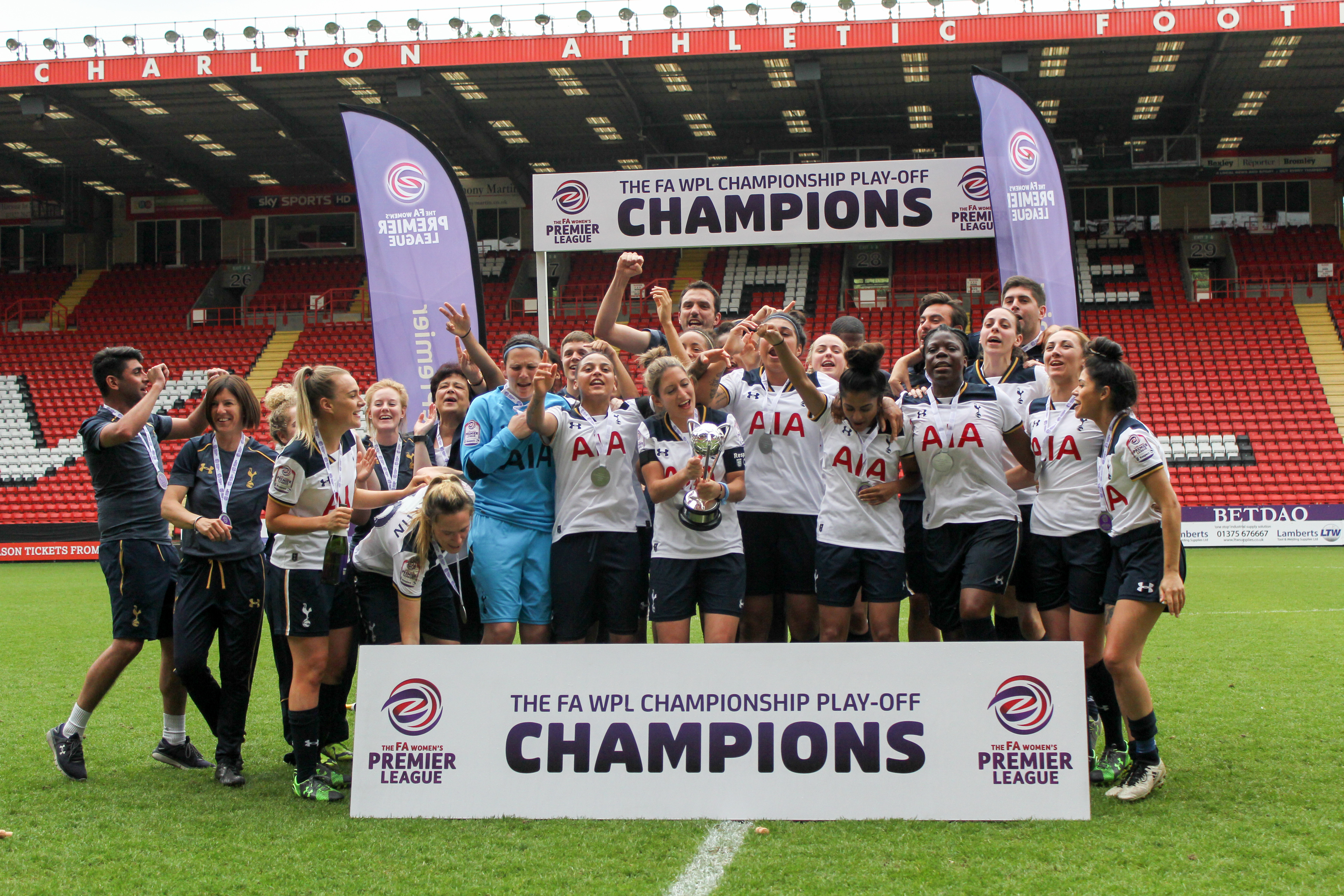
2016–17 First Team with the FA WPL Championship play-off trophy

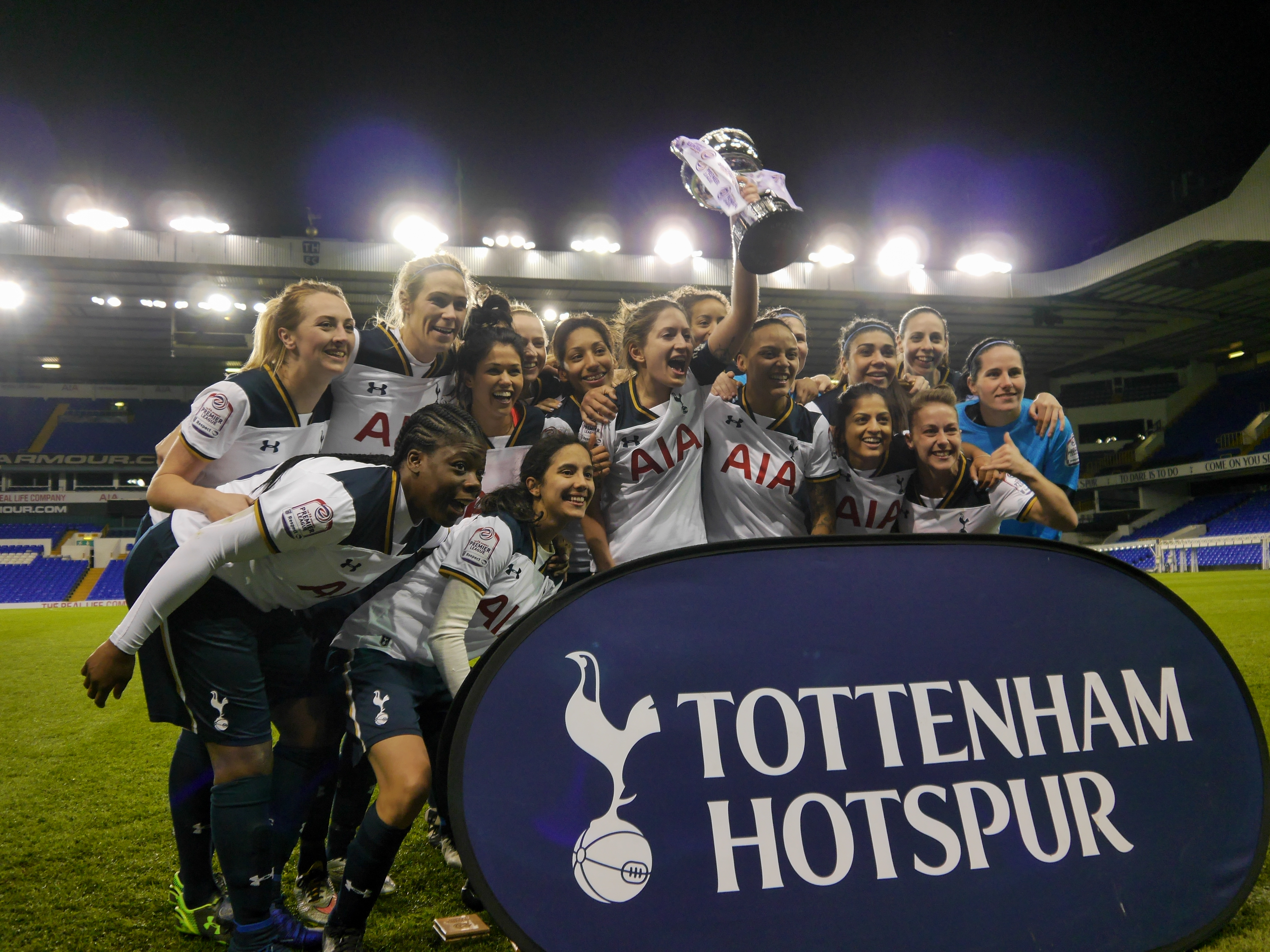
2016–17 First Team with the FA WPL Southern Division league trophy

- Women's FA Cup
  - Runners-up: 2023–24
- FA Women's Premier League
  - Championship Play-off Winners (1): 2016–17
- FA Women's Premier League Southern Division
  - Winners (1): 2016–17
- FA South-East Combination
  - Winners (1): 2010–11
- London and South-East Regional Women's Football League – Premier Division
  - Winners (1): 2007–08
- Greater London Regional Women's League – Division 1
  - Winners (1): 1997–98
- London County Senior Cup
  - Winners (1): 2011–12
- Greater London Regional Women's League Cup
  - Winners (1): 1995–96
- Russell Cup
  - Winners (1): 1997–98
- Ryman's Women's Cup
  - Winners (2): 2015–16, 2016–17
- FA Women's Premier League Cup
  - Winners (2): 2015–16, 2016–17

=== Reserves ===
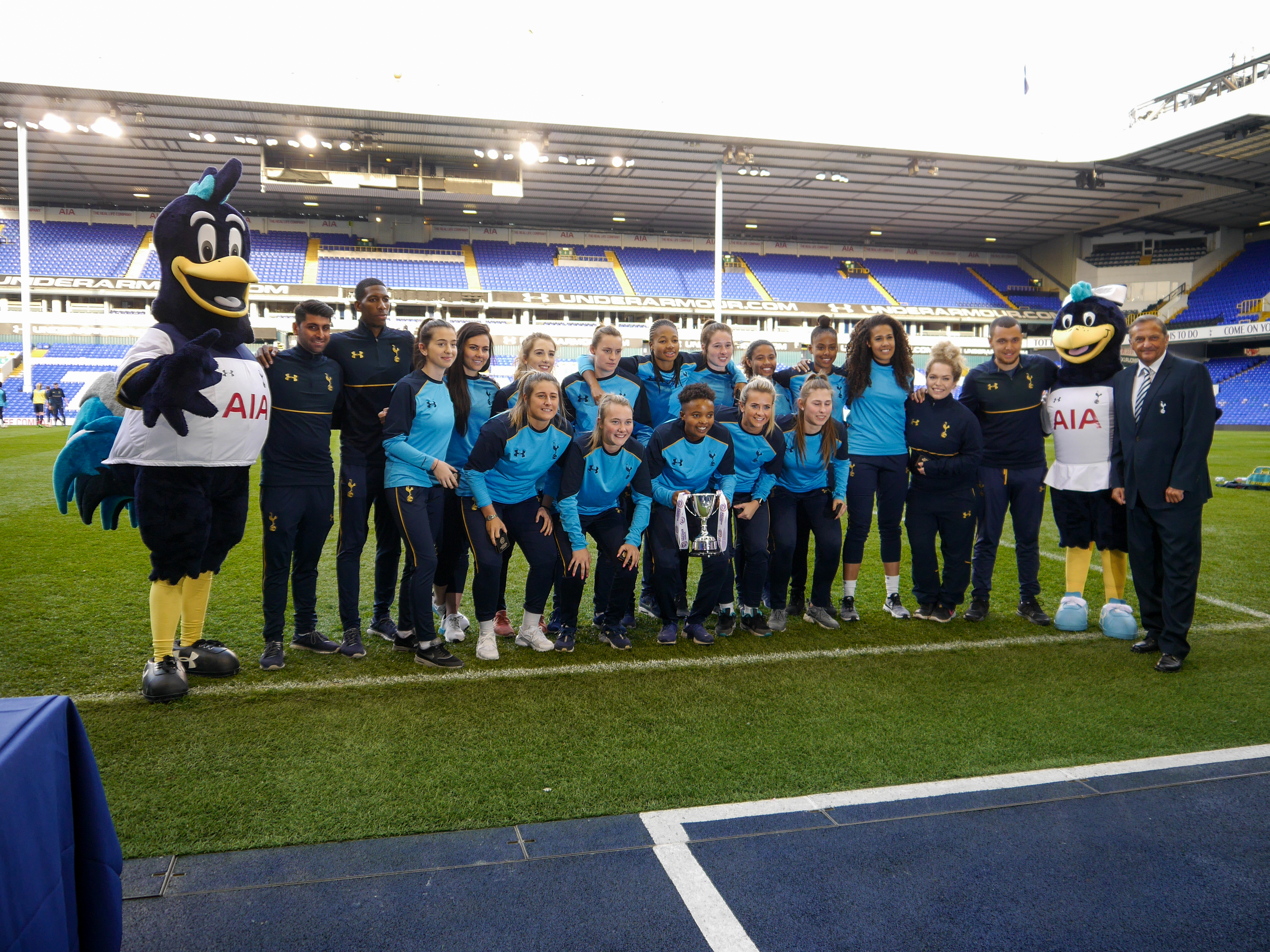
2016–17 Reserve Team with the FA WPL Reserve Southern Division league trophy

- Capital Women's Intermediate Cup
  - Winners (1): 2016–17
- FA Women's Premier League Reserve Cup
  - Winners (1): 2016–17
- FA Women's Premier League Reserve Southern Division
  - Winners (1): 2016–17
- Greater London Regional Women's League – Reserve Division 1
  - Winners (1): 2006–07
- London County Junior Cup
  - Winners (1): 2012–13
- Sue Sharples Memorial Trophy
  - Winners (2): 1995–95, 2006–07

=== Youth ===
- Greater London Regional Women's League – Reserve Division 3 (West)
  - Winners (1): 1997–98
- Greater London Regional Women's League – Reserve Division 2
  - Winners (1): 2003–04

== See also ==
- Tottenham Hotspur F.C.
