= 2023–24 Tottenham Hotspur F.C. Women season =

Tottenham Hotspur
2023–24 season
- Head coach: Robert Vilahamn
- Stadium: Brisbane Road, Leyton
- WSL: 6th
- FA Cup: Runners-up
- League Cup: Quarter-finals
- Top goalscorer: League: Martha Thomas (7); All: Martha Thomas (10)
- Highest home attendance: 19,480 (vs. Arsenal, 16 December)
- Lowest home attendance: 1,290 (vs. Brighton & Hove Albion, 28 April)
- Average home league attendance: 4,318
Home colours	Away colours	Third colours

The 2023–24 season was Tottenham Hotspur's fifth season in the top flight of the English football league system and 39th season in existence. Along with competing in the WSL, the club also contested two domestic cup competitions: the FA Cup and the League Cup.

Ahead of the new season, Robert Vilahamn was named head coach on 7 July 2023, departing BK Häcken FF who were top of the 2023 Damallsvenskan after 17 games. Tottenham had ended the previous season under interim manager Vicky Jepson following the sacking of Rehanne Skinner in March 2023.

On 15 September, Bethany England was named captain. Olga Ahtinen and Molly Bartrip were named vice-captains.

== Squad ==
As of 31 January 2024

Note: Flags indicate national team as defined under FIFA eligibility rules; some limited exceptions apply. Players may hold more than one non-FIFA nationality.

No.	Pos.	Nation	Player
1	GK	CZE	Barbora Votíková
2	DF	AUS	Charlotte Grant
4	DF	ENG	Amy James-Turner
5	DF	ENG	Molly Bartrip (vice-captain)
6	DF	SWE	Amanda Nildén (on loan from Juventus)
7	FW	ENG	Jessica Naz
8	MF	ENG	Grace Clinton (on loan from Manchester United)
9	FW	ENG	Bethany England (captain)
10	FW	ENG	Ellie Brazil
11	MF	GER	Ramona Petzelberger
13	MF	SWE	Matilda Vinberg
14	FW	NOR	Celin Bizet Ildhusøy

No.	Pos.	Nation	Player
16	FW	ENG	Kit Graham
17	FW	SCO	Martha Thomas
20	MF	FIN	Olga Ahtinen (vice-captain)
21	DF	SUI	Luana Bühler
22	GK	JAM	Rebecca Spencer
23	FW	MAR	Rosella Ayane
24	MF	JAM	Drew Spence
25	MF	FIN	Eveliina Summanen
27	GK	ENG	Eleanor Heeps
29	DF	ENG	Ashleigh Neville
77	MF	CHN	Wang Shuang

== Transfers ==
=== Transfers in ===
Date	Position	Nationality	Name	From	Ref.
8 July 2023	DF	(Switzerland)	Luana Bühler	(Germany) 1899 Hoffenheim	
16 August 2023	MF	(Finland)	Olga Ahtinen	(Sweden) Linköpings FC	
17 August 2023	GK	(Czech Republic)	Barbora Votíková	(France) Paris Saint-Germain	
14 September 2023	FW	(Scotland)	Martha Thomas	(England) Manchester United	
1 January 2024	MF	(China)	Wang Shuang	(United States) Racing Louisville	
2 January 2024	MF	(Sweden)	Matilda Vinberg	(Sweden) Hammarby IF	
3 January 2024	DF	(Australia)	Charlotte Grant	(Sweden) Vittsjö GIK	
2 February 2024	FW	(England)	Araya Dennis	(England) Arsenal	

=== Loans in ===
Date	Position	Nationality	Name	From	Until	Ref.
14 August 2023	MF	(England)	Grace Clinton	(England) Manchester United	End of season	
14 September 2023	FW	(China)	Zhang Linyan	(China) Wuhan Jianghan University	23 January 2024	
18 January 2024	DF	(Sweden)	Amanda Nildén	(Italy) Juventus	End of season	

=== Transfers out ===
Date	Position	Nationality	Name	To	Ref.
2 June 2023	DF	(England)	Kerys Harrop	Retired	
2 June 2023	FW	(Australia)	Kyah Simon	(Australia) Central Coast Mariners	
2 June 2023	FW	(England)	Chioma Ubogagu		
2 June 2023	MF	(South Korea)	Cho So-hyun	(England) Birmingham City	
2 June 2023	DF	(Wales)	Esther Morgan	(Scotland) Heart of Midlothian	
9 June 2023	GK	(Finland)	Tinja-Riikka Korpela	(Italy) AS Roma	
31 January 2024	MF	(Wales)	Angharad James	(United States) Seattle Reign	

=== Loans out ===
Date	Position	Nationality	Name	To	Until	Ref.
1 September 2023	FW	(England)	Lenna Gunning-Williams	(England) Ipswich Town	End of season	
5 September 2023	FW	(Poland)	Nikola Karczewska	(Germany) Bayer Leverkusen	End of season	
21 October 2023	GK	(England)	Eleanor Heeps	(England) Sheffield United	31 December 2023	
3 January 2024	DF	(Canada)	Shelina Zadorsky	(England) West Ham United	End of season	
12 January 2024	DF	(England)	Gracie Pearse	(England) Charlton Athletic	End of season	
12 January 2024	MF	(New Zealand)	Ria Percival	(England) Crystal Palace	End of season	
12 January 2024	MF	(England)	Elkie Bowyer (Note: Dual registration)	(England) Ipswich Town	End of season	
12 January 2024	MF	(Australia)	Milly Boughton	(England) Ipswich Town	End of season	
24 January 2024	DF	(England)	Asmita Ale	(England) Leicester City	End of season	
2 February 2024	FW	(England)	Araya Dennis	(England) Crystal Palace	End of season	

== Preseason ==
26 August 2023 Friendly	Tottenham Hotspur	0–0	Aston Villa	Tottenham
		Report		Stadium: Tottenham Hotspur Stadium; Attendance: Behind-closed-doors

30 August 2023 Friendly	London Bees	0–9	Tottenham Hotspur	Enfield
		Report	Bizet; Graham; James; Naz; Clinton; Neville	Stadium: Queen Elizabeth II Stadium; Attendance: Behind-closed-doors

10 September 2023 Friendly	Brighton & Hove Albion	0–0	Tottenham Hotspur	Lancing
		Report		Stadium: American Express Elite Football Performance Centre

17 September 2023 Friendly	Tottenham Hotspur	0–1	Manchester United	Burton upon Trent
14:00 BST		Report	García 26'	Stadium: St George's Park; Attendance: Behind-closed-doors

== Women's Super League ==
=== Results summary ===
Overall								Home						Away					
Pld	W	D	L	GF	GA	GD	Pts	W	D	L	GF	GA	GD	W	D	L	GF	GA	GD
22	8	7	7	31	36	−5	31	4	3	4	12	14	−2	4	4	3	19	22	−3

Last updated: 18 May 2024.
Source: WSL

=== Results by matchday ===
Round	1	2	3	4	5	6	7	8	9	10	11	12	13	14	15	16	17	18	19	20	21	22
Ground	A	H	A	A	H	H	A	A	H	H	A	H	A	H	A	H	A	A	H	A	H	H
Result	L	W	W	W	D	D	D	L	L	W	W	L	D	L	L	W	W	D	D	D	L	W
Position	9	6	4	3	3	4	5	6	6	6	6	6	6	6	6	6	6	6	6	6	6	6

A = Away; H = Home; W = Win; D = Draw; L = Loss

=== Results ===
1 October 2023 1	Chelsea	2–1	Tottenham Hotspur	Fulham
17:30 BST	Fishel 28'; James 51'	Report	Spence (yellow card) 30'; Thomas 76'	Stadium: Stamford Bridge; Attendance: 14,776; Referee: Cheryl Foster

8 October 2023 2	Tottenham Hotspur	3–1	Bristol City	Leyton
14:00 BST	Neville (yellow card) 23'; Ahtinen 31'; Thomas 35'; Summanen 45+4'	Report	Napier (yellow card) 12'; Aspin (yellow card) 59'; Thestrup 64' (pen.)	Stadium: Brisbane Road; Attendance: 1,605; Referee: Lauren Impey

15 October 2023 3	Brighton & Hove Albion	1–3	Tottenham Hotspur	Brighton and Hove
16:00 BST	Terland 8'; Pinto (yellow card) 81'	Report	Thomas 45+3'; Clinton 65'; Percival 90+4'	Stadium: Falmer Stadium; Attendance: 6,951; Referee: Kirsty Dowle

21 October 2023 4	Aston Villa	2–4	Tottenham Hotspur	Walsall
12:30 BST	Daly 5' (pen.); Corsie (yellow card) 76'; Parker 90+6'	Report	Thomas 33', 64', 72', (yellow card) 67'; Neville 45+5'	Stadium: Bescot Stadium; Attendance: 2,810; Referee: Lauren Impey

5 November 2023 5	Tottenham Hotspur	1–1	Everton	Leyton
14:00 GMT	Clinton (yellow card) 42', (goal) 43'; Thomas (yellow card) 90+6'	Report	Galli (yellow card) 37', (goal) 85' (pen.); Payne (yellow card) 90+5'	Stadium: Brisbane Road; Attendance: 1,920; Referee: Emily Heaslip

12 November 2023 6	Tottenham Hotspur	1–1	Liverpool	Leyton
12:30 GMT	Bizet 27'	Report	Haug 66'; Kearns (yellow card) 89'	Stadium: Brisbane Road; Attendance: 2,155; Referee: Abigail Byrne

19 November 2023 7	Leicester City	1–1	Tottenham Hotspur	Leicester
15:00 GMT	Cayman 18'	Report	Bizet 56'; James (yellow card) 74'	Stadium: King Power Stadium; Attendance: 1,953; Referee: Andy Madley

26 November 2023 8	Manchester City	7–0	Tottenham Hotspur	Manchester
18:45 GMT	Angeldahl (yellow card) 15'; Shaw 23', 32', 38'; Roord (yellow card) 27', (goal) 53'; Hemp 48'; Coombs 59', 90+6'	Report	Bartrip (yellow card) 74'	Stadium: Academy Stadium; Attendance: 2,134; Referee: Richie Watkins

10 December 2023 9	Tottenham Hotspur	0–4	Manchester United	Leyton
18:45 GMT	Naz (yellow card) 49'	Report	Blundell 29'; Toone 51'; Malard 59'; Ladd 84'	Stadium: Brisbane Road; Attendance: 2,152; Referee: Kirsty Dowle

16 December 2023 10	Tottenham Hotspur	1–0	Arsenal	Tottenham
12:00 GMT	Thomas 58'; Votíková (yellow card) 70'	Report	Wubben-Moy (yellow card) 63'	Stadium: Tottenham Hotspur Stadium; Attendance: 19,480; Referee: Cheryl Foster

21 January 2024 11	West Ham United	3–4	Tottenham Hotspur	Dagenham
19:00 GMT	Ueki (yellow card) 21'; Cissoko (yellow card) 29'; Shimizu 35'; Gorry (yellow card) 42'; Asseyi 62', (yellow card) 87'; Tysiak 70'	Report	Clinton 6', 48'; Bizet 43'; Naz 75'; Bartip (yellow card) 84'	Stadium: Victoria Road; Attendance: 1,293; Referee: Stacey Pearson

28 January 2024 12	Tottenham Hotspur	0–2	Manchester City	Leyton
14:00 GMT	Summanen (yellow card) 45+1'; Ahtinen (yellow card) 70'	Report	James-Turner 9' (o.g.); Shaw 51'	Stadium: Brisbane Road; Attendance: 2,889; Referee: Melissa Burgin

4 February 2024 13	Liverpool	1–1	Tottenham Hotspur	Birkenhead
14:00 GMT	Höbinger 90+1'	Report	Thomas (yellow card) 29'; Bizet 71'; Wang (yellow card) 88'; Grant (yellow card) 89'; Graham (yellow card) 90+5'; Naz (yellow card) 90+6'	Stadium: Prenton Park; Attendance: 1,979; Referee: Lauren Impey

18 February 2024 14	Tottenham Hotspur	1–2	Aston Villa	Leyton
14:00 GMT	James-Turner 38'; Bartrip (yellow card) 90+5'	Report	Leon 23', (yellow card) 56'; Nobbs 60', (yellow card) 81'; Hanson (yellow card) 62'; Maritz (yellow card) 90+2'	Stadium: Brisbane Road; Attendance: 1,971; Referee: Adewunmi Soneye

3 March 2024 15	Arsenal	1–0	Tottenham Hotspur	Holloway
12:30 GMT	Russo 49'; Wubben-Moy (yellow card) 65'; McCabe (yellow card) 80'	Report	Ahtinen (yellow card) 79'; Summanen (yellow card) 82'; Spence (yellow card) 83'; Clinton (yellow card) 85'	Stadium: Emirates Stadium; Attendance: 60,050; Referee: Abigail Byrne

17 March 2024 16	Tottenham Hotspur	1–0	Leicester City	Leyton
14:00 GMT	Vinberg 2'; Bizet (yellow card) 45+4'; Neville (yellow card) 63'; Petzelberger (yellow card) 83'	Report	Cayman (yellow card) 73'; Pelgander (yellow card) 88'	Stadium: Brisbane Road; Attendance: 1,507; Referee: Adewunmi Soneye

24 March 2024 17	Bristol City	0–1	Tottenham Hotspur	Bristol
14:00 GMT	Ward (yellow card) 89'	Report	England 2'	Stadium: Ashton Gate; Attendance: 5,262; Referee: Phoebe Cross

31 March 2024	Tottenham Hotspur	P–P	Chelsea	Leyton
12:15 BST				Stadium: Brisbane Road
Note: Postponed due to Chelsea's participation in the 2024 FA Women's League Cup final.

21 April 2024 18	Manchester United	2–2	Tottenham Hotspur	Leigh
12:00 BST	Malard 13'; Turner (yellow card) 58'; Le Tissier 90+2'	Report	England 29'; Naz 31'; Vinberg (yellow card) 60'; Nildén (yellow card) 63'; Graham (yellow card) 86'	Stadium: Leigh Sports Village; Attendance: 4,697; Referee: Rebecca Welch

28 April 2024 19	Tottenham Hotspur	1–1	Brighton & Hove Albion	Leyton
14:00 BST	England 81'; Clinton (yellow card) 90+7'	Report	Terland 17'; Lee (yellow card) 48'; Haley (yellow card) 65'; Pinto (yellow card) 69'	Stadium: Brisbane Road; Attendance: 1,290; Referee: Melissa Burgin

4 May 2024 20	Everton	2–2	Tottenham Hotspur	Liverpool
12:00 BST	S. Holmgaard 10', (yellow card) 55'; Vanhaevermaet 15'; Stenevik (yellow card) 39'	Report	Spence (yellow card) 42', (goal) 45'; England 48'; Bartrip (yellow card) 89'	Stadium: Walton Hall Park; Attendance: 1,262; Referee: Lauren Impey

15 May 2024 21	Tottenham Hotspur	0–1	Chelsea	Leyton
19:15 BST		Report	Hamano 38'; Carter (yellow card) 90+4'	Stadium: Brisbane Road; Attendance: 2,532; Referee: Emily Heaslip
Note: Rescheduled from 31 March due to Chelsea's participation in the 2024 FA Women's League Cup final.

18 May 2024 22	Tottenham Hotspur	3–1	West Ham United	Tottenham
15:00 BST	England 4'; Ahtinen (yellow card) 60'; Naz 86'; Grant (yellow card) 90+8'; Spence 90+9'	Report	Ueki 50'; Smith (yellow card) 54'	Stadium: Tottenham Hotspur Stadium; Attendance: 9,999; Referee: Phoebe Cross

=== League table ===
Pos	Team	Pld	W	D	L	GF	GA	GD	Pts
4	Liverpool	22	12	5	5	36	28	+8	41
5	Manchester United	22	10	5	7	42	32	+10	35
6	Tottenham Hotspur	22	8	7	7	31	36	−5	31
7	Aston Villa	22	7	3	12	27	43	−16	24
8	Everton	22	6	5	11	24	37	−13	23

Source: Women's Super League Table
Rules for classification: 1) Points; 2) Goal difference; 3) Number of goals scored.

== Women's FA Cup ==
As a member of the first tier, Tottenham entered the FA Cup in the fourth round proper.

14 January 2024 Fourth round	Tottenham Hotspur	3–2	Sheffield United	Leyton
14:00 GMT	England 69', 80' (pen.); Ayane 90+6'	Report	Haywood 13'; Sigsworth 51'; Newsham (yellow card) 76'	Stadium: Brisbane Road; Attendance: 894; Referee: Laura Van Lier

10 February 2024 Fifth round	Tottenham Hotspur	1–0	Charlton Athletic	Leyton
17:15 GMT	Summanen (yellow card) 30'; Graham 76'; Naz (yellow card) 90+9'	Report	O'Rourke (yellow card) 72'; Johnson (yellow card) 89'; Green (yellow card) 90+7'	Stadium: Brisbane Road; Attendance: 974; Referee: Lisa Benn

10 March 2024 Quarter-final	Tottenham Hotspur	1–1 (a.e.t.) (4–3 p)	Manchester City	Leyton
15:00 GMT	Bizet (yellow card) 20'; Graham (yellow card) 66'; England 90+6'	Report	Fowler 6'; Ouahabi (yellow card) 55'; Greenwood (yellow card) 78'; Hemp (yellow card) 98'	Stadium: Brisbane Road; Attendance: 1,314; Referee: Kirsty Dowle
	Penalties
	England (penalty scored); Ayane (penalty missed); Nildén (penalty scored); Wang (penalty scored); James-Turner (penalty scored)		(penalty missed) Greenwood; (penalty missed) Kelly; (penalty scored) Hasegawa; (penalty scored) Angeldal; (penalty scored) Fowler

14 April 2024 Semi-final	Tottenham Hotspur	2–1 (a.e.t.)	Leicester City	Tottenham
12:00 BST	James-Turner (yellow card) 19'; Summanen (yellow card) 64'; Naz 83'; Thomas 118'	Report	Rantala 12'; Momiki (yellow card) 32'; Green (yellow card) 43'; Bott (yellow card) 90+6'	Stadium: Tottenham Hotspur Stadium; Attendance: 18,078; Referee: Emily Heaslip

12 May 2024 Final	Manchester United	4–0	Tottenham Hotspur	London
14:30 BST	Toone 45+3'; Williams 54'; García 57', 74'; Blundell (yellow card) 90+2'	Report		Stadium: Wembley Stadium; Attendance: 76,082; Referee: Abigail Byrne

== FA Women's League Cup ==
=== Group stage ===
11 October 2023 Group stage	Tottenham Hotspur	6–0	Reading	Leyton
19:30 BST	Zhang 10'; Graham 19'; Ale 47'; Percival 56'; Naz 62'; Thomas 72'; Ayane (yellow card) 85'	Report		Stadium: Brisbane Road; Attendance: 531; Referee: Amy Fearn

22 November 2023 Group stage	Tottenham Hotspur	3–0	Bristol City	Leyton
19:30 GMT	Graham 19' (pen.); Ayane 29', 72'; Percival (yellow card) 31'	Report	Aspin (yellow card) 35'	Stadium: Brisbane Road; Attendance: 506; Referee: Sunny Sukhvir Gill

13 December 2023 Group stage	Arsenal	3–3 (4–3 p)	Tottenham Hotspur	Borehamwood
19:00 GMT	Blackstenius 19'; Maanum 37'; Beattie (yellow card) 59'; James-Turner 68' (o.g.)	Report	Thomas 17'; Naz 30', 48'; Petzelberger (yellow card) 61'; Clinton (yellow card) 67'; James (yellow card) 70'	Stadium: Meadow Park; Attendance: 3,618; Referee: Emily Heaslip
	Penalties
	Russo (penalty scored); Mead (penalty scored); Catley (penalty scored); Foord (penalty missed); Beattie (penalty scored)		(penalty missed) Naz; (penalty scored) Ayane; (penalty missed) Graham; (penalty scored) Zadorsky; (penalty scored) Petzelberger

25 January 2024 Group stage	Southampton	0–3	Tottenham Hotspur	Eastleigh
19:45 GMT	Lloyd-Smith (yellow card) 85'	Report	Petzelberger 29'; Vinberg (yellow card) 34'; Grant 67', (yellow card) 70'; Clinton 78'	Stadium: Ten Acres; Attendance: 1,735; Referee: Lisa Benn

Group D

Pos	Team	Pld	W	PW	PL	L	GF	GA	GD	Pts	Qualification	ARS	TOT	SOU	BRI	REA
1	Arsenal (Q)	4	3	1	0	0	14	5	+9	11	Advanced to knock-out stage	—	3–3	–	3–1	–
2	Tottenham Hotspur (Q)	4	3	0	1	0	15	3	+12	10	Possible knock-out stage based on ranking	–	—	–	3–0	6–0
3	Southampton	4	1	1	0	2	3	6	−3	5		1–2	0–3	—	–	–
4	Bristol City	4	0	0	2	2	3	8	−5	2		–	–	1–1	—	1–1
5	Reading	4	0	1	0	3	1	14	−13	2		0–6	–	0–1	–	—

Updated to match(es) played on 24 January 2024. Source: FA Women's League Cup
Rules for classification: 1) Points; 2) Goal difference; 3) Number of goals scored; 4) Number of wins; 5) Head-to-head record
(Q) Qualified to the phase indicated

Ranking of second-placed teams

Pos	Grp	Team	Pld	W	WPEN	LPEN	L	GF	GA	GD	Pts	PPG	Qualification
1	D	Tottenham Hotspur (Q)	4	3	0	1	0	15	3	+12	10	2.50	Advanced to knock-out stage
2	A	Aston Villa (Q)	4	3	0	0	1	17	1	+16	9	2.25	Advanced to knock-out stage
3	B	Manchester United	4	3	0	0	1	12	3	+9	9	2.25	
4	C	Crystal Palace	3	1	0	1	1	5	3	+2	4	1.33	
5	E	Charlton Athletic	3	1	0	0	2	3	4	−1	3	1.00	

(Q) Qualified to the phase indicated

=== Knockout stage ===
7 February 2024 Quarter-final	Tottenham Hotspur	0–1	Manchester City	Leyton
19:30 GMT		Report	Hasegawa 34'	Stadium: Brisbane Road; Attendance: 731; Referee: Amy Fearns

== Squad statistics ==
=== Appearances ===
As of match played 18 May 2024

Starting appearances are listed first, followed by substitute appearances after the + symbol where applicable.

No.	Pos	Nat	Player	Total		WSL		FA Cup		League Cup	
No.	Pos	Nat	Player	Apps	Goals	Apps	Goals	Apps	Goals	Apps	Goals
1	GK	(Czech Republic) CZE	Barbora Votíková	11	0	6	0	1	0	4	0
2	DF	(Australia) AUS	Charlotte Grant	14	1	5+3	0	2+2	0	2	1
4	DF	(England) ENG	Amy James-Turner	23	1	12+2	1	3+1	0	4+1	0
5	DF	(England) ENG	Molly Bartrip	24	0	16+2	0	2	0	3+1	0
6	DF	(Sweden) SWE	Amanda Nildén	16	0	10	0	4	0	2	0
7	FW	(England) ENG	Jessica Naz	32	7	10+12	3	4+1	1	4+1	3
8	MF	(England) ENG	Grace Clinton	27	5	20	4	3	0	2+2	1
9	FW	(England) ENG	Bethany England	21	8	12+2	5	4+1	3	0+2	0
10	FW	(England) ENG	Ellie Brazil	5	0	0+3	0	0+1	0	0+1	0
11	MF	(Germany) GER	Ramona Petzelberger	15	1	2+8	0	1	0	3+1	1
13	MF	(Sweden) SWE	Matilda Vinberg	18	1	4+7	1	1+4	0	1+1	0
14	FW	(Norway) NOR	Celin Bizet Ildhusøy	29	4	19+1	4	4+1	0	2+2	0
16	FW	(England) ENG	Kit Graham	28	3	4+14	0	1+4	1	5	2
17	FW	(Scotland) SCO	Martha Thomas	27	10	17+2	7	2+2	1	3+1	2
20	MF	(Finland) FIN	Olga Ahtinen	20	1	10+6	1	2+2	0	0	0
21	DF	(Switzerland) SUI	Luana Bühler	21	0	16	0	4	0	1	0
22	GK	(Jamaica) JAM	Rebecca Spencer	21	0	16	0	4	0	1	0
23	FW	(Morocco) MAR	Rosella Ayane	18	3	0+10	0	0+3	1	3+2	2
24	MF	(Jamaica) JAM	Drew Spence	15	2	9+3	2	2	0	0+1	0
25	MF	(Finland) FIN	Eveliina Summanen	26	1	20	1	5	0	1	0
27	GK	(England) ENG	Eleanor Heeps	0	0	0	0	0	0	0	0
29	DF	(England) ENG	Ashleigh Neville	25	1	18+1	1	4	0	1+1	0
77	MF	(China) CHN	Wang Shuang	10	0	0+6	0	1+2	0	1	0
Players away from the club on loan:
3	DF	(Canada) CAN	Shelina Zadorsky	5	0	1+1	0	0	0	2+1	0
12	MF	(New Zealand) NZL	Ria Percival	9	2	2+4	1	0	0	2+1	1
19	DF	(England) ENG	Asmita Ale	8	1	1+4	0	0	0	2+1	1
26	DF	(England) ENG	Gracie Pearse	2	0	0	0	0	0	2	0
47	MF	(Australia) AUS	Milly Boughton	1	0	0	0	0	0	0+1	0
Players who left the club during the season:
15	MF	(Wales) WAL	Angharad James	16	0	11	0	0+1	0	2+2	0
18	FW	(China) CHN	Zhang Linyan	6	1	1+2	0	1	0	2	1
