= 2024 Women's FA Cup final =

English football cup final

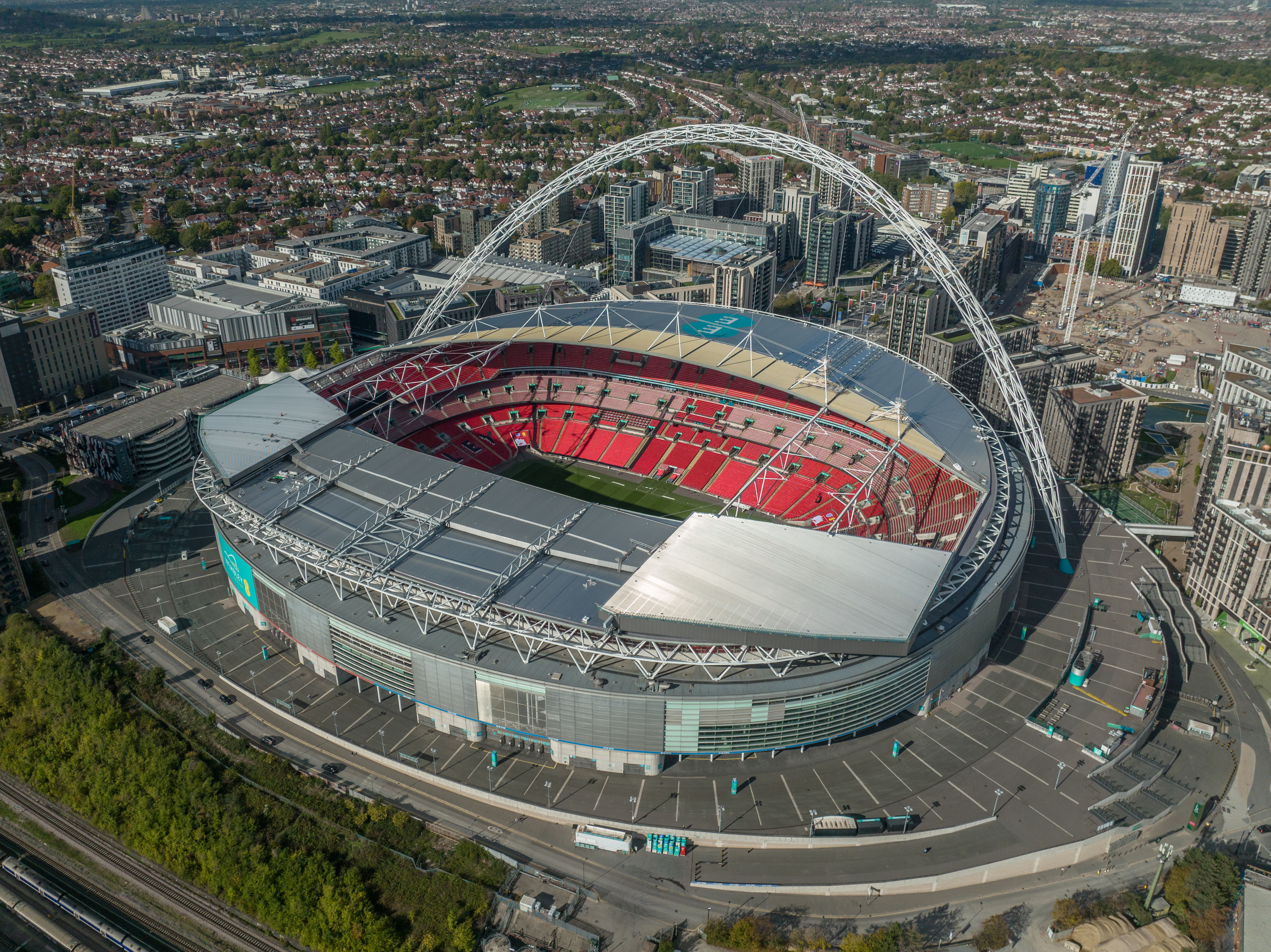
- The match took place at Wembley Stadium.
- Event: 2023–24 Women's FA Cup
Manchester United	Tottenham Hotspur
4	0
- Date: 12 May 2024
- Venue: Wembley Stadium, London
- Player of the Match: Lucía García (Manchester United)
- Referee: Abigail Byrne (Cambridgeshire)
- Attendance: 76,082
- Weather: Sunny

The 2024 Women's FA Cup final was the 54th final of the Women's FA Cup, England's primary cup competition for women's football teams. The showpiece event was the 30th to be played directly under the auspices of The Football Association and was named the Adobe Women's FA Cup final due to sponsorship reasons.

The final was contested between would-be first time winners Manchester United and Tottenham Hotspur, on 12 May 2024 at Wembley Stadium in London. Manchester United marked their second consecutive appearance in the final, having finished runners-up to Chelsea the previous year, while Tottenham Hotspur featured for the first time in their history. It was the first Women's FA Cup final since 2005 not to be contested by Chelsea, Arsenal or Manchester City and the first since 2012 that was won by a team other than those three.

== Match ==
=== Details ===
12 May 2024
14:30 BST

Manchester United	4–0	Tottenham Hotspur
Toone 45+3'; Williams 54'; García 57', 74'	Report

Wembley Stadium, London
Attendance: 76,082
Referee: Abigail Byrne (Cambridgeshire)

Manchester United	Tottenham Hotspur

GK	27	(England) Mary Earps
RB	14	(Canada) Jayde Riviere		(substituted off) 78'
CB	4	(England) Maya Le Tissier
CB	21	(England) Millie Turner
LB	6	(England) Hannah Blundell	(yellow card) 90+2'
CM	16	(Norway) Lisa Naalsund
CM	10	(England) Katie Zelem (c)
RW	17	(Spain) Lucía García		(substituted off) 77'
AM	7	(England) Ella Toone		(substituted off) 78'
LW	11	(England) Leah Galton		(substituted off) 50'
CF	28	(England) Rachel Williams		(substituted off) 58'
Substitutes:
GK	91	(United States) Phallon Tullis-Joyce
DF	5	(Republic of Ireland) Aoife Mannion		(substituted on) 78'
DF	15	(Wales) Gemma Evans
MF	8	(Spain) Irene Guerrero
MF	12	(Wales) Hayley Ladd
MF	20	(Japan) Hinata Miyazawa		(substituted on) 78'
FW	9	(France) Melvine Malard		(substituted on) 50'
FW	22	(England) Nikita Parris		(substituted on) 58'
FW	23	(Brazil) Geyse		(substituted on) 77'
Manager:
(England) Marc Skinner

GK	22	(Jamaica) Rebecca Spencer
RB	29	(England) Ashleigh Neville
CB	4	(England) Amy James-Turner
CB	21	(Switzerland) Luana Bühler
LB	6	(Sweden) Amanda Nildén	(substituted off) 68'
CM	24	(Jamaica) Drew Spence
CM	25	(Finland) Eveliina Summanen	(substituted off) 68'
RW	7	(England) Jessica Naz	(substituted off) 54'
AM	17	(Scotland) Martha Thomas	(substituted off) 68'
LW	13	(Sweden) Matilda Vinberg	(substituted off) 54'
CF	9	Bethany England (c)
Substitutes:
GK	1	(Czech Republic) Barbora Votíková
DF	2	(Australia) Charli Grant	(substituted on) 68'
DF	5	(England) Molly Bartrip
MF	11	(Germany) Ramona Petzelberger
MF	20	(Finland) Olga Ahtinen
MF	77	(China) Wang Shuang	(substituted on) 54'
FW	14	(Norway) Celin Bizet Ildhusøy	(substituted on) 54'
FW	16	(England) Kit Graham	(substituted on) 68'
FW	23	(Morocco) Rosella Ayane	(substituted on) 68'
Manager:
(Sweden) Robert Vilahamn

Player of the Match:
Lucía García (Manchester United)

Assistant referees:
Sophie Dennington (Berks & Bucks)
Nicoleta Bria (Cambridgeshire)
Fourth official:
Kirsty Dowle (Kent)
Reserve assistant referee:
Levi Gray (Army)
Video assistant referee:
David Coote (Nottinghamshire)
Assistant video assistant referee:
Natalie Aspinall (Lancashire)

Match rules

- 90 minutes
- 30 minutes of extra time if necessary
- Penalty shoot-out if scores still level
- Nine named substitutes
- Maximum of five substitutions, with a sixth allowed in extra time
