= 2022–23 Tottenham Hotspur F.C. Women season =

38th season in existence of Tottenham Hotspur F.C. Women

Tottenham Hotspur
2022–23 season
- Owner: ENIC Group
- Chairman: June Clarke
- Head coach: Rehanne Skinner (until 13 March); Vicky Jepson (from 13 March, interim)
- Stadium: Brisbane Road
- Super League: 9th
- FA Cup: Fifth round
- FA League Cup: Quarter-finals
- Top goalscorer: League: Bethany England (12); All: Bethany England (13)
- Highest home attendance: 21,940 v Manchester United; 12 February 2023
- Lowest home attendance: 303 v Everton; 14 December 2022
- Average home league attendance: 4,120
- Biggest win: 8–0 v Brighton & Hove Albion; 30 October 2022
- Biggest defeat: 0–4 v Arsenal; 24 September 2022; 1–5 v Arsenal; 25 March 2023
Home colours	Away colours	Third colours

The 2022–23 season is Tottenham Hotspur's fourth season in the top flight of the English football league system and 38th season in existence. In addition to the domestic league, they contested this season's FA Cup and FA League Cup.

== Season squad ==
Squad No.	Name	Nationality
Goalkeepers
1	Tinja-Riikka Korpela	(Finland)
22	Rebecca Spencer	(Jamaica)
Defenders
3	Shelina Zadorsky (C)	(Canada)
4	Amy Turner	(England)
5	Molly Bartrip	(England)
6	Kerys Harrop	(England)
13	Asmita Ale	(England)
29	Ashleigh Neville	(England)
Midfielders
8	Cho So-hyun	(South Korea)
11	Ramona Petzelberger	(Germany)
12	Ria Percival	(New Zealand)
15	Angharad James	(Wales)
24	Drew Spence	(Jamaica)
25	Eveliina Summanen	(Finland)
Forwards
7	Jessica Naz	(England)
9	Nikola Karczewska	(Poland)
10	Ellie Brazil	(England)
14	Celin Bizet Ildhusøy	(Norway)
16	Kit Graham	(England)
17	Kyah Simon	(Australia)
18	Chioma Ubogagu	(England)
19	Bethany England	(England)
20	Mana Iwabuchi	(Japan)
23	Rosella Ayane	(Morocco)
Out on loan
26	Gracie Pearse (DF)	(England)
27	Eleanor Heeps (GK)	(England)
30	Esther Morgan (DF)	(Wales)

Last updated: 26 January 2023.
Source: Tottenham Hotspur

== Transfers ==
=== Released ===
Date from	Position	Nationality	Player	To	Notes	Ref.
28 May 2022	FW	(England)	Angela Addison	(England) Charlton Athletic	End of contract	
28 May 2022	DF	(Wales)	Josie Green	(England) Leicester City	End of contract	
28 May 2022	FW	(England)	Rachel Williams	(England) Manchester United	End of contract	

- Note: Players will join other clubs after being released or terminated from their contract. Only the following clubs are mentioned when that club signed the player in the same transfer window.

=== Loans in ===
Date from	Position	Nationality	Player	From	Date until	Ref.
18 January 2023	FW	(Japan)	Mana Iwabuchi	(England) Arsenal	End of season	

=== Loans out ===
Date from	Position	Nationality	Player	To	Date until	Ref.
12 September 2022	GK	(England)	Eleanor Heeps	(England) Coventry United	End of season	
12 September 2022	DF	(Wales)	Esther Morgan	(England) Coventry United	January 2023	
5 January 2023	DF	(England)	Gracie Pearse	(England) Bristol City	End of season	
26 January 2023	DF	(Wales)	Esther Morgan	(England) Sunderland	End of season	

=== Transfers in ===
Date from	Position	Nationality	Player	From	Fee	Ref.
20 June 2022	MF	(Jamaica)	Drew Spence	(England) Chelsea	Free transfer	
6 July 2022	FW	(England)	Ellie Brazil	(England) Brighton & Hove Albion	Free transfer	
13 July 2022	MF	(Germany)	Ramona Petzelberger	(England) Aston Villa	Undisclosed	
27 July 2022	DF	(England)	Amy Turner	(United States) Orlando Pride	Undisclosed	
29 July 2022	FW	(Poland)	Nikola Karczewska	(France) Fleury 91	Undisclosed	
30 July 2022	MF	(Wales)	Angharad James	(United States) Orlando Pride	Undisclosed	
10 August 2022	FW	(Norway)	Celin Bizet Ildhusøy	(France) Paris Saint-Germain	Undisclosed	
4 January 2023	FW	(England)	Bethany England	(England) Chelsea	£250,000	

=== Transfers out ===
Date from	Position	Nationality	Player	To	Fee	Ref.
17 June 2022	MF	(France)	Maéva Clemaron	(Switzerland) Servette	Undisclosed	

== Pre-season friendlies ==
To prepare for the upcoming season, Tottenham played a series of friendlies across the world. The club first met Mexican club Club América and Japanese club Tokyo Verdy Beleza in the United States for the 2022 The Women's Cup on 14 and 17 August 2022, respectively. The team then travelled back to England to play Chelsea on 28 August 2022.

14 August 2022 Women's Cup; Quarter-finals	Tottenham Hotspur (England)	1–2	(Mexico) Club América	Louisville, United States
19:00 EDT	Bartrip (yellow card) 21'; Ale (yellow card) 60'; Karczewska 64'; James (yellow card) 71'; Turner (yellow card) 86'	Report	Palacios 10'; Camberos 15'; Kaci (yellow card) 44'; M. Hernández (yellow card) 86'	Stadium: Lynn Family Stadium

17 August 2022 Women's Cup; Fifth-place match	Tokyo Verdy Beleza (Japan)	2–1	(England) Tottenham Hotspur	Louisville, United States
11:00 EDT	Ueki 19'; Miyagawa (yellow card) 44'; Iwashimizu 82'	Report	Ayane 57', (yellow card) 58'	Stadium: Lynn Family Stadium

28 August 2022	Chelsea (England)	2–0	(England) Tottenham Hotspur	Kingston upon Thames
14:00 GMT	Harder 15'; James 39'	Report		Stadium: Kingsmeadow; Attendance: 2,400

== Competitions ==
=== Overview ===
Competition	First match	Last match	Starting round	Final position	Record							
Competition	First match	Last match	Starting round	Final position	Pld	W	D	L	GF	GA	GD	Win %
Super League	18 September 2022	28 May 2023	Matchday 1		22	5	3	14	31	47	−16	22.73
FA Cup	29 January 2023	26 February 2023	Fourth round	Fifth round	2	1	1	0	5	0	+5	50.00
FA League Cup	2 October 2022	25 January 2023	Group stage	Quarter-finals	4	3	0	1	9	5	+4	75.00
Total					28	9	4	15	45	52	−7	32.14

Last updated: 27 May 2023
Source: Soccerway

=== Super League ===
==== League table ====
Pos	Team	Pld	W	D	L	GF	GA	GD	Pts
7	Liverpool	22	6	5	11	24	39	−15	23
8	West Ham United	22	6	3	13	23	44	−21	21
9	Tottenham Hotspur	22	5	3	14	31	47	−16	18
10	Leicester City	22	5	1	16	15	48	−33	16
11	Brighton & Hove Albion	22	4	4	14	26	63	−37	16

Source: Women's Super League
Rules for classification: 1) Points; 2) Goal difference; 3) Number of goals scored.

==== Results summary ====
Overall								Home						Away					
Pld	W	D	L	GF	GA	GD	Pts	W	D	L	GF	GA	GD	W	D	L	GF	GA	GD
22	5	3	14	31	47	−16	18	3	2	6	15	24	−9	2	1	8	16	23	−7

Last updated: 27 May 2023.
Source: ESPN

==== Results by round ====
Round	1	2	3	4	5	6	7	8	9	10	11	12	13	14	15	16	17	18	19	20	21	22
Ground	A	A	H	H	A	A	A	H	H	A	H	H	H	A	A	H	A	H	H	A	H	A
Result	W	L	W	L	W	L	L	L	L	L	L	L	L	L	W	L	L	D	D	L	W	D
Position	5	9	7	8	5	7	7	7	8	8	9	9	10	10	9	9	9	9	9	10	9	9

Source: Football Web Pages
A = Away; H = Home; W = Win; D = Draw; L = Loss

==== Matches ====
The Super League fixtures were announced on 12 July 2022.

18 September 2022 1	Leicester City	1–2	Tottenham Hotspur	Leicester
15:00 BST	Spence 58' (o.g.); O'Brien (yellow card) 79'	Report	Neville 35', (yellow card) 85'; Spence 45+2'	Stadium: King Power Stadium; Attendance: 2,868; Referee: Kirsty Dowle

24 September 2022 2	Arsenal	4–0	Tottenham Hotspur	Holloway
13:30 BST	Mead 5'; Miedema 44', 69'; Rafaelle 54'; Foord (yellow card) 56'	Report	Spence (yellow card) 54'; Turner (yellow card) 59'; Neville (yellow card) 62'	Stadium: Emirates Stadium; Attendance: 47,367; Referee: Rebecca Welch

16 October 2022 3	Tottenham Hotspur	1–0	Liverpool	Leyton
14:00 BST	Fahey 11' (o.g.); Karczewska (yellow card) 71'; Turner (yellow card) 88'; Summanen (yellow card) 90+5'	Report	Furness (yellow card) 56'; Hinds (yellow card) 90+5'	Stadium: Brisbane Road; Attendance: 2,105; Referee: Abigail Byrne

22 October 2022 4	Tottenham Hotspur	0–3	Manchester City	Leyton
11:30 BST	Neville (yellow card) 45+5'	Report	Shaw 41', 47'; Kelly (yellow card) 55'; Hemp 76'	Stadium: Brisbane Road; Attendance: 1,888; Referee: Emily Heaslip

30 October 2022 5	Brighton & Hove Albion	0–8	Tottenham Hotspur	Crawley
14:00 GMT		Report	Bartrip 2'; Karczewska 19'; Neville 29', 56'; Spence 45+2', 58'; Naz 60', 83', (yellow card) 75'	Stadium: Broadfield Stadium; Attendance: 2,514; Referee: Louise Saunders

20 November 2022 6	Chelsea	3–0	Tottenham Hotspur	Fulham
13:00 GMT	Kerr 12'; Cuthbert 26'; Reiten 36' (pen.)	Report	Ildhusøy (yellow card) 9'; Neville (yellow card) 36'; Summanen (yellow card) 62'	Stadium: Stamford Bridge; Attendance: 38,350; Referee: Rebecca Welch

4 December 2022 7	Reading	1–0	Tottenham Hotspur	Reading
12:30 GMT	Turner 12' (o.g.)	Report		Stadium: Madejski Stadium; Attendance: 1,052; Referee: Carl Brook

11 December 2022 8	Tottenham Hotspur	0–2	West Ham United	Leyton
14:00 GMT		Report	Fisk (yellow card) 32'; Brynjarsdóttir (penalty missed) 45+2', 49'; Stringer (yellow card) 82'; Cissoko 83'; Longhurst (yellow card) 89'	Stadium: Brisbane Road; Attendance: 1,391; Referee: Richie Watkins

14 December 2022 9	Tottenham Hotspur	0–3	Everton	Leyton
19:00 GMT	Naz (yellow card) 69'; Summanen (yellow card) 87'; Neville (red card) 90'	Report	Snoeijs 8'; Park 38'; Beever-Jones (yellow card) 89'; Giovana 90+5'	Stadium: Brisbane Road; Attendance: 303; Referee: Kirsty Dowle
Note: The match was originally scheduled to be played on 6 November 2022, but was postponed due to a waterlogged pitch.

14 January 2023 10	Aston Villa	2–1	Tottenham Hotspur	Walsall
12:30 GMT	Dali 34'; Daly 38'; Nobbs (yellow card) 64'	Report	Turner (yellow card) 16'; England 29'; Ayane (yellow card) 69'; Spence (yellow card) 84'	Stadium: The Poundland Bescot Stadium; Attendance: 2,094; Referee: Thomas Kirk

5 February 2023 11	Tottenham Hotspur	2–3	Chelsea	Leyton
12:30 GMT	England 15'; Karczewska 88'	Report	Carter 8'; James 27'; Buchanan (yellow card) 28'; Cuthbert (yellow card) 45+1'; Reiten 65'	Stadium: Brisbane Road; Attendance: 1,880; Referee: Abigail Byrne

12 February 2023 12	Tottenham Hotspur	1–2	Manchester United	Tottenham
12:00 GMT	Spence (yellow card) 62'; England 75'; Summanen (yellow card) 87'	Report	Galton 67'; Bartrip 76' (o.g.); Toone (red card) 80'	Stadium: Tottenham Hotspur Stadium; Attendance: 21,940; Referee: Amy Fearn
Note: The match was originally scheduled to be played on 10 September 2022, but was included in the league-wide postponement due to the death of Queen Elizabeth II.

5 March 2023 13	Manchester City	3–1	Tottenham Hotspur	Manchester
14:00 GMT	Shaw 45+1', 46', 82'; Aleixandri (yellow card) 49'; Houghton (yellow card) 72'; Greenwood (yellow card) 90+2'	Report	Bizet 31'; Spence (yellow card) 34'	Stadium: Academy Stadium; Attendance: 3,684; Referee: Abigail Byrne

12 March 2023 14	Liverpool	2–1	Tottenham Hotspur	Birkenhead
14:00 GMT	Koivisto 20'; Bo Kearns 34'; Campbell (yellow card) 53'; Laws (yellow card) 90+8'	Report	Ayane 18'; Turner (yellow card) 31'	Stadium: Prenton Park; Attendance: 1,971; Referee: Jane Simms

15 March 2023 15	Tottenham Hotspur	1–0	Leicester City	Leyton
19:00 GMT	Bartrip (yellow card) 37'; England 64'	Report		Stadium: Brisbane Road; Attendance: 305; Referee: Yoshimi Yamashita
Note: The match was originally scheduled to be played on 22 January 2023, but was postponed due to a frozen pitch.

25 March 2023 16	Tottenham Hotspur	1–5	Arsenal	Leyton
13:00 BST	England 38' (pen.); James (yellow card) 69'	Report	Blackstenius 4'; Foord 28', 70'; Little 66' (pen.); Maanum 77'	Stadium: Brisbane Road; Attendance: 3,754; Referee: Louise Saunders

2 April 2023 17	Everton	2–1	Tottenham Hotspur	Liverpool
12:00 BST	Sørensen 4'; Beever-Jones 90+3', (yellow card) 90+7'	Report	Summanen 22'	Stadium: Walton Hall Park; Attendance: 1,542; Referee: Lisa Benn

23 April 2023 18	Tottenham Hotspur	3–3	Aston Villa	Leyton
14:00 BST	Summanen 27', 47'; England 59'	Report	Hanson 9', (yellow card) 75'; Daly 21', 84'	Stadium: Brisbane Road; Attendance: 1,159; Referee: Stacey Pearson

30 April 2023 19	Tottenham Hotspur	2–2	Brighton & Hove Albion	Tottenham
17:15 BST	England 12', 78'	Report	Terland 10', (yellow card) 68'; Lee (yellow card) 63', (goal) 65'	Stadium: Tottenham Hotspur Stadium; Attendance: 4,194; Referee: Cheryl Foster

7 May 2023 20	Manchester United	3–0	Tottenham Hotspur	Leigh
12:30 BST	Galton 32'; Russo 35'; Parris 53'	Report	Bartrip (yellow card) 22'; Harrop (yellow card) 41'	Stadium: Leigh Sports Village; Attendance: 5,796; Referee: Kirsty Dowle

20 May 2023 21	Tottenham Hotspur	4–1	Reading	Tottenham
16:15 BST	England 29', 62'; Bartrip (yellow card) 39'; Bizet 41'; Graham 75'; Spencer (yellow card) 84'	Report	Moore (yellow card) 49'; Cooper (yellow card) 57'; Vanhaevermaet 79'; Bryson (yellow card) 90+3'	Stadium: Tottenham Hotspur Stadium; Attendance: 6,403; Referee: Emily Heaslip

27 May 2023 22	West Ham United	2–2	Tottenham Hotspur	Dagenham
14:30 BST	Snerle 38'; Graham 44' (o.g.)	Report	England 20', 48'; Spence (yellow card) 61'; Harrop (yellow card) 88'; Summanen (yellow card) 90'	Stadium: Chigwell Construction Stadium; Attendance: 2,084; Referee: Stacey Pearson

=== FA Cup ===
Tottenham entered the competition in the fourth round and were drawn home to London City Lionesses. They were then drawn home to Reading.

29 January 2023 Fourth round	Tottenham Hotspur	5–0	London City Lionesses	Leyton
12:00 GMT	England 11'; Iwabuchi 45+1'; Spence 48'; Bennett 65' (o.g.); Summanen 79'	Report	Bennett (yellow card) 72'	Stadium: Brisbane Road; Attendance: 463; Referee: Melissa Burgin

26 February 2023 Fifth round	Tottenham Hotspur	0–0 (a.e.t.) (4–5 p)	Reading	Leyton
14:00 GMT	Spence (yellow card) 90+2'; Harrop (yellow card) 112'	Report		Stadium: Brisbane Road; Attendance: 572; Referee: Amy Fearn
	Penalties
	Spence (penalty scored); Graham (penalty scored); Harrop (penalty missed); Bizet (penalty scored); Ayane (penalty scored)		(penalty scored) Vanhaevermaet; (penalty scored) Mukandi; (penalty scored) Eikeland; (penalty scored) Troelsgaard; (penalty scored) Wade

=== FA League Cup ===
==== Group stage ====
Pos	Team	Pld	W	WPEN	LPEN	L	GF	GA	GD	Pts	Qualification	TOT	REA	COV	SOU
1	Tottenham Hotspur	3	3	0	0	0	8	2	+6	9	Advanced to knock-out stage	—	–	5–1	–
2	Reading	3	2	0	0	1	8	2	+6	6	Possible knock-out stage based on ranking	1–2	—	–	–
3	Coventry United	3	1	0	0	2	3	9	−6	3		–	0–4	—	2–0
4	Southampton	3	0	0	0	3	0	6	−6	0		0–1	0–3	–	—

Rules for classification: 1) Points; 2) Goal difference; 3) Number of goals scored; 4) Number of wins; 5) Head-to-head record

2 October 2022 1	Reading	1–2	Tottenham Hotspur	Reading
14:00 BST	Primmer (yellow card) 45+3'; Dowie 90+10' (pen.)	Report	Neville 7', (yellow card) 56'; Karczewska 30'	Stadium: Madejski Stadium; Attendance: 2,200; Referee: Amy Fearn

27 November 2022 2	Tottenham Hotspur	5–1	Coventry United	Leyton
14:00 GMT	Summanen 6'; Ayane 14'; Harrop 25'; Turner 60'; Gunning-Williams 90+3'	Report	Morris (yellow card) 54'; Orthodoxou 90+1'	Stadium: Brisbane Road; Attendance: 566; Referee: Josh Smith

18 December 2022 1	Southampton	0–1	Tottenham Hotspur	Southampton
12:00 GMT	Parnell (yellow card) 62'	Report	Karczewska 26'	Stadium: St Mary's Stadium; Attendance: 2,725; Referee: Stacey Fullicks

==== Knockout phase ====
25 January 2023 Quarter-finals	Tottenham Hotspur	1–3	Chelsea	Leyton
19:45 GMT	Ayane (yellow card) 67'; Spence 90+4'	Report	Kerr 38', 86'; Kirby 68'; Reiten (yellow card) 75'; James (yellow card) 90+5'	Stadium: Brisbane Road; Attendance: 657; Referee: Stacey Pearson

== Statistics ==
=== Appearances ===
Updated 27 May 2023

No.	Pos.	Player	Super League		FA Cup		FA League Cup		Total	
No.	Pos.	Player	Apps	Goals	Apps	Goals	Apps	Goals	Apps	Goals
Goalkeepers
1	GK	(Finland) Tinja-Riikka Korpela	11	0	2	0	3	0	16	0
22	GK	(Jamaica) Rebecca Spencer	11	0	0	0	1+1	0	12+1	0
Defenders
3	DF	(Canada) Shelina Zadorsky	13	0	1	0	2	0	16	0
4	DF	(England) Amy Turner	22	0	1+1	0	4	1	27+1	1
5	DF	(England) Molly Bartrip	22	1	2	0	4	0	28	1
6	DF	(England) Kerys Harrop	12+3	0	2	0	3	1	17+3	1
13	DF	(England) Asmita Ale	10+3	0	1+1	0	1+1	0	12+5	0
26	DF	(England) Gracie Pearse	0+1	0	0	0	2	0	2+1	0
29	DF	(England) Ashleigh Neville	19+2	3	2	0	1	1	22+2	4
Midfielders
8	MF	(South Korea) Cho So-hyun	4+5	0	0	0	1+2	0	5+7	0
11	MF	(Germany) Ramona Petzelberger	0+2	0	0	0	0	0	0+2	0
12	MF	(New Zealand) Ria Percival	0+4	0	0	0	0	0	0+4	0
15	MF	(Wales) Angharad James	17+5	0	2	0	3+1	0	22+6	0
24	MF	(Jamaica) Drew Spence	21	3	2	1	2+2	1	25+2	5
25	MF	(Finland) Eveliina Summanen	17+3	3	0+1	1	4	1	21+4	5
37	MF	(England) Ella Rose Houghton	0	0	0	0	0+1	0	0+1	0
40	MF	(England) Kayleigh Stead	0	0	0	0	0+1	0	0+1	0
Forwards
7	FW	(England) Jessica Naz	5+9	2	0	0	1	0	6+9	2
9	FW	(Poland) Nikola Karczewska	6+7	2	1+1	0	2+1	2	9+9	4
10	FW	(England) Ellie Brazil	1+2	0	0	0	0+1	0	1+3	0
14	FW	(Norway) Celin Bizet Ildhusøy	16+5	2	2	0	3	0	21+5	2
16	FW	(England) Kit Graham	2+7	1	0+1	0	0	0	2+8	1
17	FW	(Australia) Kyah Simon	1+1	0	0	0	0+1	0	1+2	0
18	FW	(England) Chioma Ubogagu	2+7	0	0+2	0	2+1	0	4+10	0
19	FW	Bethany England	12	12	1	1	1	0	14	13
20	FW	(Japan) Mana Iwabuchi	5+5	0	2	1	1	0	8+5	1
23	FW	(Morocco) Rosella Ayane	13+6	1	1+1	0	3	1	17+7	2
39	FW	(England) Lenna Gunning-Williams	0+1	0	0	0	0+2	1	0+3	1

=== Goalscorers ===
Updated 27 May 2023
The list is sorted by shirt number when total goals are equal.

Rnk	Pos	No.	Player	Super League	FA Cup	FA League Cup	Total
1	FW	19	Bethany England	12	1	0	13
2	MF	24	(Jamaica) Drew Spence	3	1	1	5
2	MF	25	(Finland) Eveliina Summanen	3	1	1	5
4	FW	9	(Poland) Nikola Karczewska	2	0	2	4
4	DF	29	(England) Ashleigh Neville	3	0	1	4
6	FW	7	(England) Jessica Naz	2	0	0	2
6	FW	14	(Norway) Celin Bizet Ildhusøy	2	0	0	2
6	FW	23	(Morocco) Rosella Ayane	1	0	1	2
9	DF	4	(England) Amy Turner	0	0	1	1
9	DF	5	(England) Molly Bartrip	1	0	0	1
9	DF	6	(England) Kerys Harrop	0	0	1	1
9	FW	16	(England) Kit Graham	1	0	0	1
9	FW	20	(Japan) Mana Iwabuchi	0	1	0	1
9	FW	39	(England) Lenna Gunning-Williams	0	0	1	1
Own goal				1	0	0	1
Total				31	5	9	45

==== Own goals ====
Player	Against	Competition	Minute	Score after own goal	Result	Date
(Jamaica) Drew Spence	Leicester City	Super League	58'	2–1	2–1 (A)	18 September 2022
(England) Amy Turner	Reading	Super League	12'	0–1	0–1 (A)	4 December 2022
(England) Molly Bartrip	Manchester United	Super League	76'	1–2	1–2 (H)	12 February 2023
(England) Kit Graham	West Ham United	Super League	44'	1–2	2–2 (A)	27 May 2023

=== Disciplinary ===
Updated 27 May 2023
The list is sorted by shirt number when total cards are equal.

Rnk	Pos	No.	Name	Super League			FA Cup			FA League Cup			Total		
Rnk	Pos	No.	Name	Yellow card	Second yellow card	Red card	Yellow card	Second yellow card	Red card	Yellow card	Second yellow card	Red card	Yellow card	Second yellow card	Red card
1	DF	29	(England) Ashleigh Neville	4	0	1	0	0	0	1	0	0	5	0	1
2	MF	24	(Jamaica) Drew Spence	5	0	0	1	0	0	0	0	0	6	0	0
3	MF	25	(Finland) Eveliina Summanen	5	0	0	0	0	0	0	0	0	5	0	0
4	DF	4	(England) Amy Turner	4	0	0	0	0	0	0	0	0	4	0	0
5	DF	5	(England) Molly Bartrip	3	0	0	0	0	0	0	0	0	3	0	0
5	DF	6	(England) Kerys Harrop	2	0	0	1	0	0	0	0	0	3	0	0
7	FW	7	(England) Jessica Naz	2	0	0	0	0	0	0	0	0	2	0	0
7	FW	23	(Morocco) Rosella Ayane	1	0	0	0	0	0	1	0	0	2	0	0
9	FW	9	(Poland) Nikola Karczewska	1	0	0	0	0	0	0	0	0	1	0	0
9	FW	14	(Norway) Celin Bizet Ildhusøy	1	0	0	0	0	0	0	0	0	1	0	0
9	MF	15	(Wales) Angharad James	1	0	0	0	0	0	0	0	0	1	0	0
9	GK	22	(Jamaica) Rebecca Spencer	1	0	0	0	0	0	0	0	0	1	0	0
Total				30	0	1	2	0	0	2	0	0	34	0	1

=== Clean sheets ===
Updated 27 May 2023
The list is sorted by shirt number when total clean sheets are equal.

Rnk	No.	Player	Super League	FA Cup	FA League Cup	Total
1	1	(Finland) Tinja-Riikka Korpela	3	2	1	6
Total			3	2	1	6

== See also ==
- 2022–23 in English football
