= Angharad James-Turner =

Welsh footballer (born 1994)

- James-Turner with the Seattle Reign in 2026

Personal information
- Full name: Angharad Jane James
- Date of birth: 1 June 1994 (age 32)
- Place of birth: Haverfordwest, Wales
- Height: 5 ft 7 in (1.70 m)
- Position: Midfielder

Team information
- Current team: Seattle Reign
- Number: 6

Youth career
- Clarbeston Road
- Manorbier Girls
- 2010–2011: Arsenal

Senior career*
Years	Team	Apps	(Gls)
2011	Arsenal	0	(0)
2012–2015	Bristol Academy	52	(4)
2016	Notts County	15	(0)
2017	Yeovil Town	4	(1)
2017–2019	Everton	35	(0)
2019–2021	Reading	36	(2)
2021	North Carolina Courage	17	(1)
2022	Orlando Pride	6	(1)
2022–2024	Tottenham Hotspur	33	(0)
2024–	Seattle Reign	55	(2)

International career^{‡}
	Wales U17	10	
	Wales U19	25	
2011–	Wales	147	(6)
- * Club domestic league appearances and goals as of 16:34, 8 November 2026 (UTC) ‡ National team caps and goals as of 18 October 2026

Angharad Jane James (born 1 June 1994), also known as Angharad James-Turner, is a Welsh professional footballer who plays as a midfielder for National Women's Soccer League club Seattle Reign and the Wales national team.

James-Turner has previously played for English FA Women's Super League clubs Arsenal, Bristol Academy, Notts County, Yeovil Town, Everton, Reading, and Tottenham Hotspur, as well as American clubs North Carolina Courage and Orlando Pride in the National Women's Soccer League. Internationally, James-Turner has represented Wales since her debut in 2011 and was named Women's Players' Player of the Year for Wales in 2017 having previously been twice named Wales Women's Young Player of the Year in 2013 and 2014.

At 28, James-Turner is the youngest ever Cymru player to accrue 100 caps for her country in a World Cup Qualifier against Slovenia. She was appointed Cymru captain in 2024.

On 11 December 2022 she reached the 150 mark for Women's Super League appearances.

== Club career ==
=== Arsenal ===
James-Turner joined the Arsenal Academy in 2010 at the age of 16, after playing for Manorbier Ladies in her native Pembrokeshire. She made her senior first team debut on 5 October 2011 as a 63rd-minute substitute for Gilly Flaherty in a 6–0 home win over Belarusian side Bobruichanka Bobruisk in the UEFA Champions League round of 32.

=== Bristol Academy ===
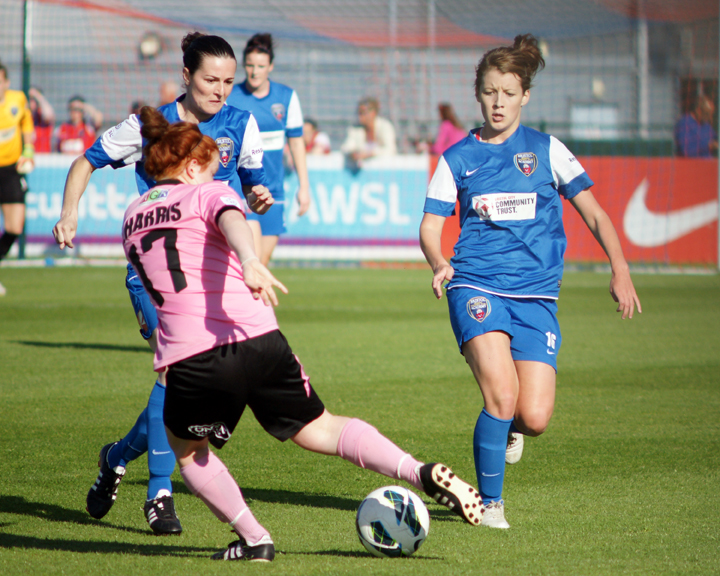
James-Turner playing for Bristol Academy in June 2013

Ahead of the 2012 FA WSL season, James-Turner was signed by Mark Sampson for Bristol Academy. She made her Bristol debut on 22 April 2014 as a 60th-minute substitute for Molly Clarke in a 1–0 home defeat to Lincoln Ladies. On 26 May 2013, James-Turner appeared as a halftime substitute for Alex Windell during the 2013 FA Women's Cup Final. Bristol lost 3–0 to Arsenal. James-Turner played in 13 of Bristol's 14 league games during the 2013 FA WSL season as the team earned their highest ever finish, runners-up behind Liverpool. The two met on the final day of the season separated by two points with Liverpool winning 2–0 to clinch the title. During the 2015 FA WSL season, James-Turner played in all 14 games as the Vixens were relegated. She left following the team's relegation having made 83 appearances in all competitions, scoring six goals. On her departure, Bristol manager Willie Kirk said, "You never want to lose top players, but following relegation it was inevitable that we would lose a few. Angharad played a big part in the club's successes over the past few seasons and at only 21 has bags of potential and can achieve a lot in the game... Angharad made her intentions to stay in WSL1 known to me very quickly so we have been planning for this for a while now."

=== Notts County ===
Having stated her desire to remain in the top-flight, James-Turner signed for Notts County in March 2016 ahead of the 2016 FA WSL season. She made 18 appearances in 2016. Two days prior to the start of the FA WSL Spring Series in April 2017, Notts County folded, leaving the players without a club.

=== Yeovil Town ===
On 16 May 2017, following the folding of Notts County, James-Turner signed a short-term one month contract with newly promoted WSL 1 side Yeovil Town for the remainder of the FA WSL Spring Series. She made four appearances and scored one goal in a 2–1 defeat to Sunderland as Yeovil finished bottom.

=== Everton ===
In July 2017, James-Turner left Yeovil to join newly-promoted Everton ahead of the 2017–18 FA WSL season. She became an integral part of the team, starting in 43 of her 47 appearances for the club during her two seasons as a Toffee.

=== Reading ===
In July 2019, James-Turner left Everton to join Reading. On 17 November 2019, James-Turner scored her first Reading goal, and her first goal since scoring for Yeovil May 2017, in a 3–3 draw with Bristol City. James-Turner captained Reading on 7 October 2020 in their 4–0 win over second division Charlton Athletic in the League Cup group stage in the absence of Natasha Harding. James-Turner scored her only other goal for Reading on 23 January 2021 in the third minute of a 2–2 WSL draw with Aston Villa. On 24 February 2021, Reading announced that James-Turner had agreed to join North Carolina Courage of the American National Women's Soccer League (NWSL) upon the completion of the 2020–21 FA WSL season in May. She left having made 48 appearances and scored two goals. In her final season with the team, James-Turner led the FA WSL in successful tackles with 46 and was one of three outfield players to play all 1,980 minutes along with West Ham's Grace Fisk and Manchester United's Millie Turner.

=== North Carolina Courage ===
Having agreed terms in February, James-Turner joined North Carolina Courage in May after the end of the 2020–21 FA WSL season. She was named to a matchday squad for the first time on 5 June 2021 as an unused substitute against Chicago Red Stars before eventually debuting two games later on 23 June when she started against Racing Louisville. The Courage won 2–0 with head coach Paul Riley commenting James-Turner, "has a great range of passing and a great engine. She plays intelligently with the ball, and for me, she was one of the highlights of the night". James-Turner scored her first NWSL goal and only goal for the Courage on 25 September 2021 in a 3–1 defeat away to Gotham FC. James-Turner made 17 appearances during her debut NWSL season including one in the playoffs.

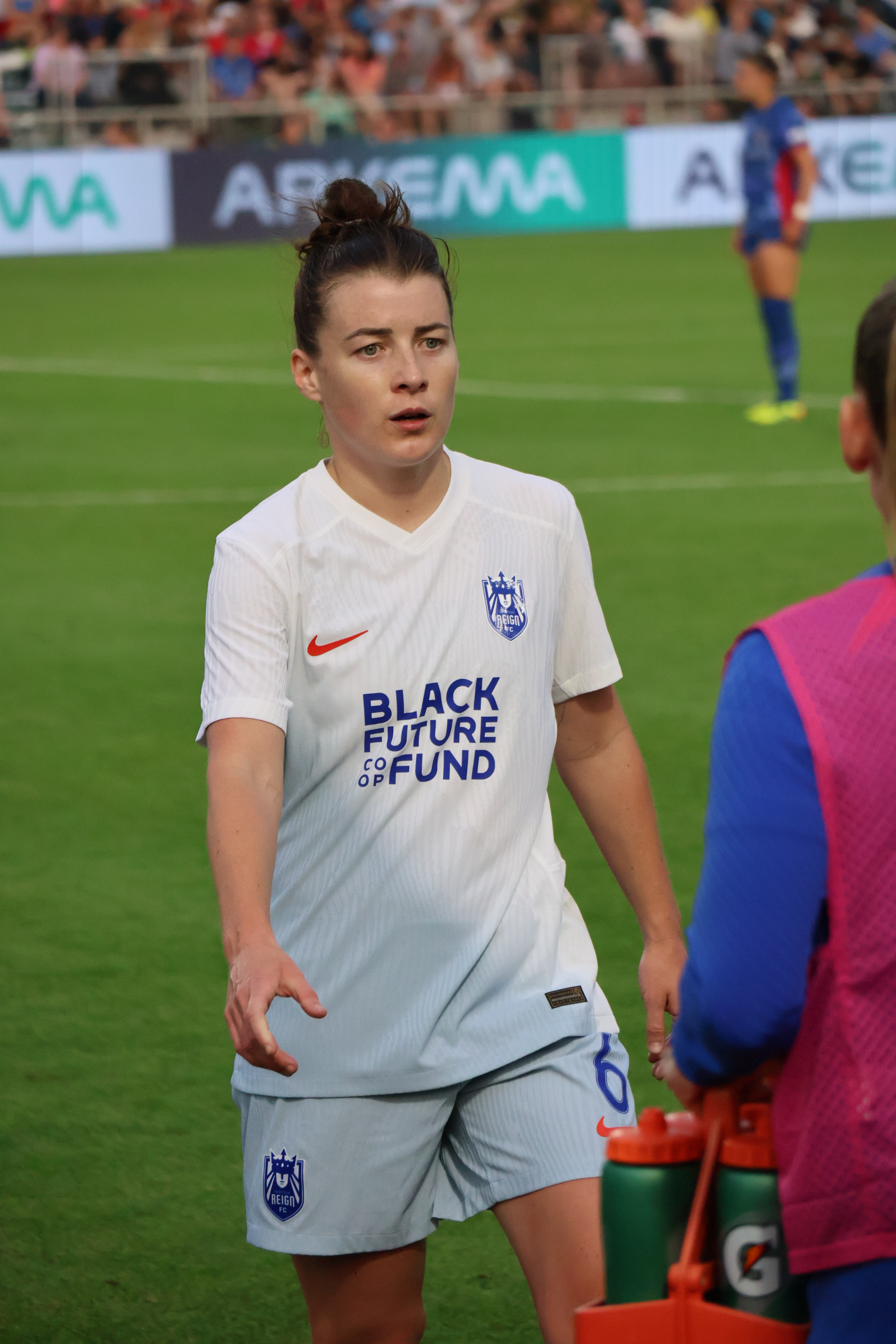
James-Turner playing in April 2024

=== Orlando Pride ===
Having been traded to San Diego Wave FC in exchange for roster protection during the 2022 NWSL Expansion Draft on 8 December 2021, James-Turner was subsequently traded to Orlando Pride along with a league record $275,000 in Allocation Money in exchange for Alex Morgan eight days later. The move reunited her with fiancée Amy Turner, the first time since Notts County in 2016 they had been at a club at the same time.

James-Turner made her Orlando debut on 19 March 2022 at home to Washington Spirit in the 2022 NWSL Challenge Cup. She would make four further appearances in the Cup competition that year ahead of the regular season opener on 2 May 2022 against Gotham FC where she would make her league debut for Orlando.

On 28 July 2022, James-Turner and Orlando agreed to mutually terminate her contract.

=== Tottenham Hotspur ===
On 30 July 2022, it was announced that James-Turner had signed for English WSL side Tottenham Hotspur on a two-year deal with the option of a further year.

=== Seattle Reign ===
On 31 January 2024, it was announced that James-Turner had signed for NWSL club Seattle Reign until the end of 2025.

== International ==
=== Youth ===
James-Turner previously represented Wales at under-16, under-17 and under-19 level. The team automatically qualified for the 2013 UEFA Women's Under-19 Championship as the host nation, their first appearance at the tournament. Despite the team losing all three group games and failing to score, James-Turner's performances earned her a place in 22-player the Squad of the Tournament, Wales' sole representative.

=== Senior ===
On 27 October 2011, James-Turner made her senior international debut, aged 17, as a late substitute in a 2–2 draw with Scotland at Tynecastle Park during UEFA Women's Euro 2013 qualifying. She scored her first senior international goal on 29 February 2012, a 90+2 minute winner in a 1–0 victory over Portugal at the 2012 Algarve Cup. James-Turner earned her 100th International Cap for Wales on 6 September 2022 in a World Cup Qualifier against Slovenia, a game which also saw her Wales team qualify for the World Cup play-offs for the first time in their history. On 4 October 2024, she was appointed as Wales captain.

In June 2025, James-Turner was named in Cymru's squad for UEFA Women's Euro 2025 as the Captain, with 132 caps.

=== Great Britain Olympic ===
In January 2012, James-Turner was named on the provisional Great Britain women's Olympic football team longlist for the London 2012 Olympics. James-Turner had stated on numerous occasions that if she was selected she would accept a call-up to Team GB.

== Personal life ==
James-Turner speaks Welsh, viewing it not only as an expression of her identity but also a tactical advantage when playing English-speaking opposition. Prior to focusing on football, James-Turner also played cricket and was capped internationally at under-15 level. She attended Ysgol y Preseli at the same time as fellow Welsh international footballer Joe Allen. Angharad grew up unaware of the Cymru women's team and only became aware on her arrival at Arsenal, where Jayne Ludlow became an important role model for Angharad.

James-Turner's father, Clive James, played rugby for, and later became head coach of, Narberth RFC.

On 23 December 2020, James-Turner announced her engagement to fellow professional footballer Amy Turner. They married in June 2023, and James-Turner began playing under her married name in 2024.

== Career statistics ==
=== Club ===
As of match played 24 May 2025

Appearances and goals by club, season and competition
Club	Season	League			National Cup (Note: Women's FA Cup, NWSL Challenge Cup)		League Cup (Note: FA Women's League Cup, NWSL Playoffs)		Continental (Note: UEFA Women's Champions League, NWSL x Liga MX Femenil Summer Cup)		Total	
Club	Season	Division	Apps	Goals	Apps	Goals	Apps	Goals	Apps	Goals	Apps	Goals
Arsenal	2011	Women's Super League	0	0	0	0	0	0	1	0	1	0
Arsenal	Total		0	0	0	0	0	0	1	0	1	0
Bristol Academy	2012	Women's Super League	12	1	3	0	3	1	—		18	2
Bristol Academy	2013	Women's Super League	13	0	4	0	3	0	—		20	0
Bristol Academy	2014	Women's Super League	13	2	1	0	5	0	4	1	23	3
Bristol Academy	2015	Women's Super League	14	1	1	0	5	0	2	0	22	1
Bristol Academy	Total		52	4	9	0	16	1	6	1	83	6
Notts County	2016	Women's Super League	15	0	2	0	1	0	—		18	0
Notts County	Total		15	0	2	0	1	0	0	0	18	0
Yeovil Town	2017	Women's Super League	4	1	—		—		—		4	1
Yeovil Town	Total		4	1	0	0	0	0	0	0	4	1
Everton	2017–18	Women's Super League	16	0	3	0	4	0	—		23	0
Everton	2018–19	Women's Super League	19	0	1	0	4	0	—		24	0
Everton	Total		35	0	4	0	8	0	—		47	0
Reading	2019–20	Women's Super League	14	1	2	0	6	0	—		22	1
Reading	2020–21	Women's Super League	22	1	1	0	3	0	—		26	1
Reading	Total		36	2	3	0	9	0	—		48	2
North Carolina Courage	2021	NWSL	17	1	0	0	1	0	—		17	1
North Carolina Courage	Total		16	1	0	0	1	0	0	0	17	1
Orlando Pride	2022	NWSL	6	0	5	0	0	0	—		11	0
Orlando Pride	Total		6	0	5	0	0	0	0	0	11	0
Tottenham Hotspur	2022–23	Women's Super League	22	0	2	0	4	0	—		28	0
Tottenham Hotspur	2023–24	Women's Super League	11	0	1	0	4	0	—		16	0
Tottenham Hotspur	Total		33	0	3	0	8	0	—		44	0
Seattle Reign	2024	NWSL	15	1	—		0	0	2	0	17	1
Seattle Reign	2025	NWSL	10	0	—		0	0	0	0	10	0
Seattle Reign	Total		25	1	0	0	0	0	2	0	27	1
Career total			222	9	26	0	43	1	9	1	299	11

=== International ===
As of matches played 3 June 2025

Appearances and goals by national team and year
National team	Year	Apps	Goals
Caps prior to 2015		32	
Wales	2015	9	1
Wales	2016	7	0
Wales	2017	12	0
Wales	2018	10	0
Wales	2019	8	1
Wales	2020	5	0
Wales	2021	9	1
Wales	2022	14	0
Wales	2023	9	1
Wales	2024	11	1
Wales	2025	6	0
Total		132	6

=== International goals ===
As of matches played 3 June 2025.

No.	Date	Venue	Opponent	Score	Result	Competition
1	29 February 2012	Estádio Municipal Bela Vista, Parchal, Portugal	Portugal	0-1	0-1	2012 Algarve Cup
2	11 March 2015	Stadion Veli Jože, Poreč, Croatia	Croatia	1-1	1–1	2015 Istria Cup
3	3 September 2019	Rodney Parade, Newport, Wales	Northern Ireland	1–1	2–2	UEFA Euro 2022 qualifying
4	26 October 2021	Cardiff City Stadium, Cardiff, Wales	Estonia	1–0	4–0	2023 FIFA World Cup qualification
5	6 April 2023	Cardiff City Stadium, Cardiff, Wales	Northern Ireland	2–0	4–1	Friendly
6	5 April 2024	Racecourse Ground, Wrexham, Wales	Croatia	4–0	4–0	UEFA Women's Euro 2025 qualifying

== Honours ==
Bristol Academy

- FA Women's Super League runner-up: 2013
- Women's FA Cup runner-up: 2012–13

Individual

- Wales Women's Young Player of the Year: 2013, 2014
- Wales Women's Players' Player of the Year: 2017
