= 2024 FA Women's League Cup final =

- Event: 2023–24 FA Women's League Cup
Arsenal	Chelsea
1	0
- Date: 31 March 2024
- Venue: Molineux, Wolverhampton
- Player of the Match: Victoria Pelova (Arsenal)
- Referee: Cheryl Foster
- Attendance: 21.462

The 2024 FA Women's League Cup final was the thirteenth final of the FA Women's League Cup, England's secondary cup competition for women's football teams and its primary league cup tournament. It took place on 31 March 2024 at Molineux, and was contested by Chelsea and Arsenal.

Chelsea made their fifth consecutive (and fifth overall) appearance in a League Cup final, having lost the previous two editions. Six-time winners Arsenal contested their tenth League Cup final, and this was a rematch of the 2023 Final. It was the third time the teams had met in a League Cup final.

Arsenal won the match 1–0 and clinched their seventh title.

== Route to the final ==
=== Arsenal ===
Round	Opposition	Score
GS	Bristol City (H)	3–1
GS	Southampton (A)	1–2
GS	Tottenham Hotspur (H)	3–3
GS	Reading (A)	0–6
QF	London City Lionesses (A)	0–4
SF	Aston Villa (H)	4–0
Key: (H) = Home; (A) = Away

Arsenal entered the competition in the group stage after losing their UEFA Women's Champions League qualifier to Paris FC. They were drawn in a group with Bristol City, Southampton, Tottenham Hotspur and Reading. Against Bristol City, Frida Maanum swept Arsenal into the lead midway through the first half, and Lotte Wubben-Moy doubled their lead with a header from a corner. Bristol City got back in into the contest through Sille Struck, but Stina Blackstenius was able to seal the win for Arsenal deep into added time.

In their second match away at Southampton, a shock looked to be on the cards when Molly Pike gave the home the side the lead at the start of the second half. However, a quick reply from Maanum, and an injury time header from Amanda Illestedt, her first for the club, meant it was two wins from two for Arsenal.

A North London thriller against Tottenham Hotspur was next. Three times Spurs took the lead through Martha Thomas and Jessica Naz, only for Arsenal to match them with goals from Blackstenius, Maanum and an own goal from Amy Turner. A penalty shootout followed to determine who would win the bonus point. Sabrina D'Angelo saved from Naz and Kit Graham hit the bar as Arsenal gained the advantage. And although Caitlin Foord saw her penalty saved, Jen Beattie stepped up to score the winning spot-kick.

Arsenal sealed top spot in Group D with a comprehensive win over bottom side Reading. Blackstenius scored her first hat-trick for the club, whilst there were also goals for Foord, Laia Codina and Beth Mead.

In the quarter-finals, Arsenal were pitted against London City Lionesses. A brace from Cloé Lacasse was complimented by a penalty from Kim Little and an Alessia Russo header. In the semi-finals, Arsenal were drawn at home against Aston Villa. Again, it was another comfortable 4–0 win, with Blackstenius scoring yet another hat-trick and Maanum with a long range effort.

=== Chelsea ===
Round	Opposition	Score
GS	Bye	
QF	Sunderland (H)	5–0
SF	Manchester City (A)	0–1
Key: (H) = Home; (A) = Away

Chelsea entered the competition at the knockout stage due to their participation in the UEFA Women's Champions League.

In the quarter finals, they were paired with Sunderland. Sjoeke Nüsken and Fran Kirby both scored two goals apiece, with Aggie Beaver-Jones also finding the back of the net as Chelsea ran out comfortable 5–0 winners. Their semi-final was a much closer affair, with an away trip to Manchester City. Lauren James gave Chelsea an early lead, and they were able to hold out for the win and book a place in the League Cup Final.

== Match ==
=== Details ===
31 March 2024
15:00 GMT

Arsenal (1)	1–0 (a.e.t.)	Chelsea (1)
Blackstenius 116'	Report

Molineux Stadium, Wolverhampton
Attendance: 21,462
Referee: Cheryl Foster

Arsenal	Chelsea

GK	1	(Austria) Manuela Zinsberger
LB	15	(Republic of Ireland) Katie McCabe	(substituted off) 105'
LCB	3	(England) Lotte Wubben-Moy
RCB	6	(England) Leah Williamson	(substituted off) 45'
RB	2	(United States) Emily Fox
LCM	21	(Netherlands) Victoria Pelova
RCM	10	(Scotland) Kim Little (c)
LW	24	(Canada) Cloé Lacasse	(substituted off) 72'
CAM	12	(Norway) Frida Maanum	(substituted off) 90+13'
RW	9	(England) Beth Mead	(substituted off) 84'
FW	25	(Sweden) Stina Blackstenius
Substitutes:
GK	14	(Canada) Sabrina D'Angelo
GK	40	(England) Naomi Williams
LB	7	(Australia) Steph Catley	(substituted on) 84'
RB	26	(Austria) Laura Wienroither
CB	27	(Spain) Laia Codina	(substituted on) 45'
MF	32	(Australia) Kyra Cooney-Cross	(substituted on) 105'
FW	53	(England) Vivienne Lia
FW	23	(England) Alessia Russo	(substituted on) 90+13'
FW	19	(Australia) Caitlin Foord	(substituted on) 72'
Manager:
(Sweden) Jonas Eidevall

GK	24	(England) Hannah Hampton
LB	21	(England) Niamh Charles (c)
LCB	26	(Canada) Kadeisha Buchanan
RCB	7	(England) Jess Carter
RB	15	(France) Ève Périsset
LCM	8	(Germany) Melanie Leupolz
RCM	22	(Scotland) Erin Cuthbert	(yellow card) 90+1'
LW	10	(England) Lauren James	(yellow card) 52'	(substituted off) 119'
CAM	6	(Germany) Sjoeke Nüsken		(substituted off) 96'
RW	19	(Sweden) Johanna Rytting Kaneryd
FW	35	(Colombia) Mayra Ramírez		(substituted off) 77'
Substitutes:
GK	1	(Sweden) Zećira Mušović
GK	30	(Germany) Ann-Katrin Berger
MF	5	(Wales) Sophie Ingle
MF	12	(Canada) Ashley Lawrence
MF	11	(Norway) Guro Reiten		(substituted on) 77'
MF	14	(England) Fran Kirby
FW	9	(United States) Catarina Macario		(substituted on) 96'
FW	23	(Japan) Maika Hamano
FW	33	(England) Aggie Beever-Jones		(substituted on) 119'
Manager:
(England) Emma Hayes

Player of the match:
Victoria Pelova (Arsenal)

Assistant referees:
Emily Carney
Ruby Sykes

Fourth official:

Video assistant referee:
Michael Salisbury

Match rules

- 90 minutes.
- 30 minutes of extra-time if necessary.
- Penalty shoot-out if scores still level.
- Nine named substitutes.
- Maximum of five substitutions in three stoppages.
