= Gracie Pearse =

English footballer (born 2002)

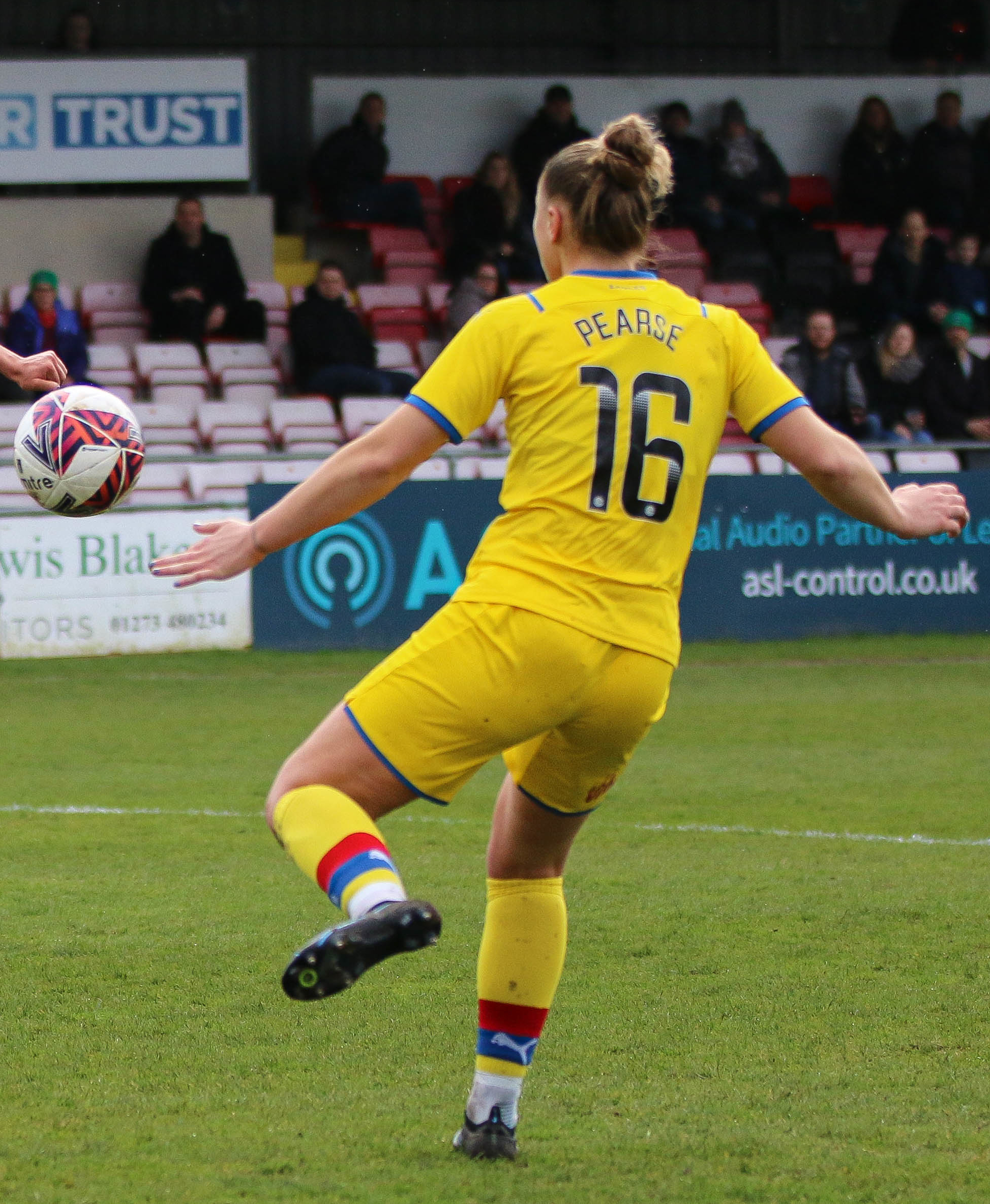
- Pearse playing for Crystal Palace in 2022

Personal information
- Full name: Gracie Jane Patricia Pearse
- Date of birth: 13 September 2002 (age 24)
- Place of birth: Welwyn Garden City, England
- Position: Defender

Team information
- Current team: Charlton Athletic
- Number: 26

Youth career
- 2011–2021: Arsenal

Senior career*
Years	Team	Apps	(Gls)
2021	Arsenal	0	(0)
2021	Crystal Palace	6	(0)
2021–2024	Tottenham Hotspur	1	(0)
2021–2022	→ Crystal Palace (loan)	19	(1)
2023	→ Bristol City (loan)	11	(1)
2024	→ Charlton Athletic (loan)	4	(0)
2024–2026	Charlton Athletic	0+	(0+)
2026–	Sheffield United	0	(0)

International career^{‡}
2018–2019	England U17	8	(0)
- * Club domestic league appearances and goals as of 20 July 2024 ‡ National team caps and goals as of February 4th 2024

Gracie Jane Patricia Pearse (born 13 September 2002) is an English professional footballer who plays as a defender for Women's Super League 2 side Sheffield United.

== Club career ==
A product of the Arsenal academy, Pearse made two appearances for the club in the 2020–21 WSL season. On 4 February 2021, she signed with Crystal Palace.

On 21 July 2021, she signed a two-year contract with Tottenham Hotspur. She then rejoined Crystal Palace on loan for the 2021–22 Championship season.

On 5 January 2023, Pearse signed on loan with Bristol City for the second half of the 2022–23 season, where she went on to win the Women's Championship with the team. On 27 November 2022, she made her first start for Spurs against Coventry in a 5–1 victory.

After making five appearances with Tottenham Hotspur since 2021, on 12 January 2024, Pearse joined Charlton Athletic on loan for the remainder of the 2021–22 Championship season.

On 7 June 2024, Tottenham Hotspur announced the departure of Pearse from the club.

On 11 July, Charlton Athletic announced the permanent signing of Pearse.

On 15 July 2026, Pearse was announced at Sheffield United.

== International career ==
Pearse has represented England at under-17, under-19, and under-21 youth level.

== Career statistics ==
As of match played 21 April 2024

Club	Season	League			FA Cup (Note: Includes the Women's FA Cup)		League Cup (Note: Includes the Women's League Cup)		Total	
Club	Season	Division	Apps	Goals	Apps	Goals	Apps	Goals	Apps	Goals
Arsenal	2020–21	Women's Super League	0	0	0	0	0	0	0	0
Crystal Palace	2020-21	Women's Championship	6	0	0	0	0	0	6	0
Tottenham Hotspur	2021–22	Women's Super League	0	0	0	0	0	0	0	0
Tottenham Hotspur	2022–23	Women's Super League	1	0	0	0	2	0	3	0
Tottenham Hotspur	2023-24	Women's Super League	0	0	0	0	2	0	2	0
Tottenham Hotspur	Total		1	0	0	0	4	0	5	0
Crystal Palace (loan)	2021-22	Women's Championship	19	1	0	0	3	0	22	1
Bristol City (loan)	2022-23	Women's Championship	11	1	2	1	0	0	13	2
Charlton Athletic (loan)	2023-24	Women's Championship	4	0	0	0	0	0	4	0
Career total			41	2	2	1	7	0	50	3

== Honours ==
Bristol City

- Women's Championship: 2022–23
