= Eveliina Summanen =

Finnish footballer (born 1998)

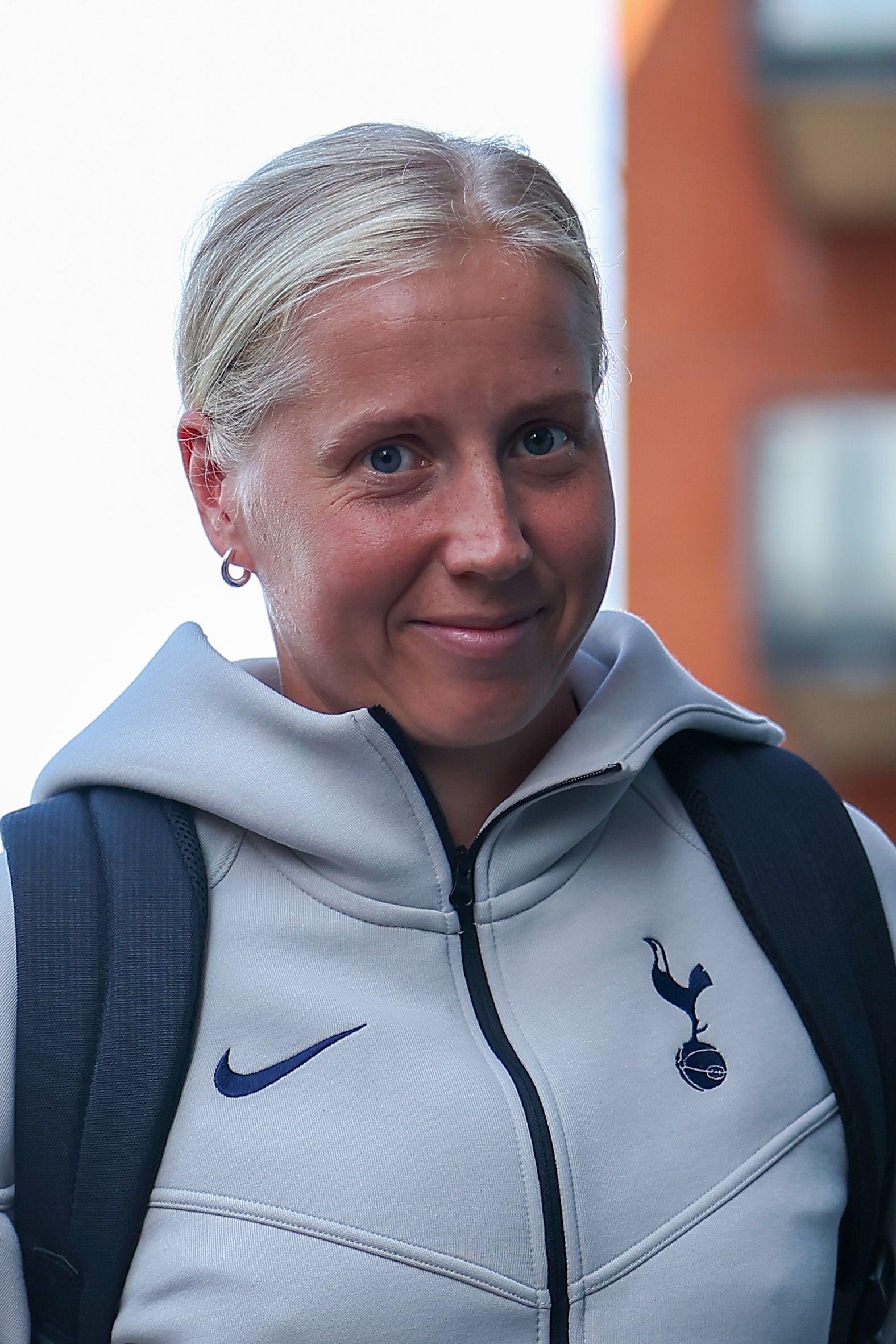
- Summanen with Tottenham Hotspur in 2025

Personal information
- Full name: Evellina Anna Maria Summanen
- Date of birth: 29 May 1998 (age 28)
- Place of birth: Lappeenranta, Finland
- Height: 1.72 m (5 ft 8 in)
- Position: Midfielder

Team information
- Current team: Tottenham Hotspur
- Number: 25

Youth career
- 2011–2016: PEPO

Senior career*
Years	Team	Apps	(Gls)
2016–2018	HJK	63	(8)
2019	KIF Örebro	21	(3)
2020–2022	Kristianstads	33	(4)
2022–	Tottenham Hotspur	90	(8)

International career^{‡}
2017–	Finland	87	(15)
- * Club domestic league appearances and goals as of 07:54, 14 September 2026 (UTC) ‡ National team caps and goals as of 08:04, 15 October 2026 (UTC)

Eveliina Anna Maria Summanen (Finnish: [ˈeʋeliːnɑ ˈɑnːɑ ˈmɑriɑ ˈsumːɑnen]; born 29 May 1998) is a Finnish professional footballer who plays as a midfielder for Women's Super League club Tottenham Hotspur and the Finland national team.

Summanen started her career with her native HJK, before moving to Sweden with KIF Örebro and Kristianstads before joining English side Tottenham Hotspur in 2022, where she has made over 100 league appearances. She has been called up to two Euro squads, and currently holds the record for most assists as a Tottenham Hotspur women's player.

== Club career ==
During her youth career, Summanen played for both the boys and girls teams at PEPO, before joining HJK in 2016.

On 10 January 2022, Summanen joined FA WSL side Tottenham Hotspur for an undisclosed fee, signing a contract until 2023. On 17 November 2023, she signed a new contract extension that would last until 2026. In December 2024, she won the November Goal of the Month award for her 40-yard strike against Aston Villa. On 1 February 2026, she made her 100th league appearance for Tottenham. On 11 February 2026, it was announced that she had signed a new contract to extend her time with Tottenham, having become the Tottenham Hotspur record-holder for assists in the WSL.

== International career ==
Summanen has been capped for the Finland national team, appearing for the team during the 2019 FIFA Women's World Cup qualifying cycle.

On 9 June 2022, Summanen was called up to the Finland squad for the UEFA Women's Euro 2022.

On 19 June 2025, Summanen was called up to the Finland squad for the UEFA Women's Euro 2025.

== Career statistics ==
=== Club ===
As of match played 13 September 2026

Appearances and goals by club, season and competition
Club	Season	League			National cup (Note: Includes Naisten Suomen Cup, Svenska Cupen, Women's FA Cup)		League cup (Note: Includes FA Women's League Cup)		Continental (Note: Includes UEFA Women's Champions League)		Total	
Club	Season	Division	Apps	Goals	Apps	Goals	Apps	Goals	Apps	Goals	Apps	Goals
HJK	2016	Naisten Liiga	19	0	2	0	—		—		21	0
HJK	2017	Naisten Liiga	21	3	4	1	—		—		25	4
HJK	2018	Naisten Liiga	23	5	1	1	—		—		24	6
HJK	Total		63	8	7	2	0	0	0	0	70	10
KIF Örebro	2019	Damallsvenskan	21	3	2	0	—		—		23	3
Kristianstads	2020	Damallsvenskan	22	4	1	0	—		—		23	4
Kristianstads	2021	Damallsvenskan	20	1	3	0	—		2	0	25	1
Kristianstads	Total		42	5	4	0	0	0	2	0	48	5
Tottenham Hotspur	2021–22	Women's Super League	10	0	1	0	1	0	—		12	0
Tottenham Hotspur	2022–23	Women's Super League	20	3	1	1	4	1	—		25	5
Tottenham Hotspur	2023–24	Women's Super League	20	1	5	0	1	0	—		26	1
Tottenham Hotspur	2024–25	Women's Super League	17	2	0	0	2	1	—		19	3
Tottenham Hotspur	2025–26	Women's Super League	21	2	3	1	3	0	—		27	3
Tottenham Hotspur	2026–27	Women's Super League	2	0	0	0	0	0	—		2	0
Tottenham Hotspur	Total		90	8	10	2	11	2	0	0	111	12
Career total			216	24	23	4	11	2	2	0	252	30

=== International ===
As of match played 13 October 2026

Appearances and goals by national team and year
National team	Year	Apps	Goals
Finland	2017	1	0
Finland	2018	7	2
Finland	2019	12	0
Finland	2020	5	1
Finland	2021	9	3
Finland	2022	13	3
Finland	2023	11	6
Finland	2024	13	0
Finland	2025	11	0
Finland	2026	6	0
Total		87	15

Scores and results list Finland's goal tally first, score column indicates score after each Summanen goal.

List of international goals scored by Eveliina Summanen
No.	Date	Venue	Opponent	Score	Result	Competition
1	13 June 2018	Stadion u Gornjoj Varoši, Belgrade, Serbia	Serbia	2–0	2–0	2019 FIFA Women's World Cup qualification
2	4 October 2018	Yongchuan Sports Centre, Yongchuan, China	Thailand	1–0	3–1	2018 Yongchuan International Tournament
3	27 October 2020	Bolt Arena, Helsinki, Finland	Scotland	1–0	1–0	UEFA Women's Euro 2022 qualifying
4	11 April 2021	Sonnenseestadion, Ritzing, Austria	Austria	1–2	2–2	Friendly
5	11 April 2021	Sonnenseestadion, Ritzing, Austria	Austria	2–2	2–2	Friendly
6	11 June 2021	Pinatar Training Football Center, San Pedro del Pinatar, Spain	Poland	1–0	2–2	Friendly
7	12 April 2022	Bolt Arena, Helsinki, Finland	Georgia	2–0	6–0	2023 FIFA Women's World Cup qualification
8	12 April 2022	Bolt Arena, Helsinki, Finland	Georgia	5–0	6–0	2023 FIFA Women's World Cup qualification
9	12 November 2022	Pinatar Arena Football Center, San Pedro del Pinatar, Spain	Wales	1–1	1–1	Friendly
10	16 February 2023	GSZ Stadium, Larnaca, Cyprus	Croatia	1–0	4–1	2023 Cyprus Women's Cup
11.	19 February 2023	AEK Arena, Larnaca, Cyprus	Hungary	7–0	8–0	2023 Cyprus Women's Cup
12	14 July 2023	Laugardalsvöllur, Reykjavík, Iceland	Iceland	1–0	2–1	Friendly
13	27 September 2023	Stadionul Arcul de Triumf, Bucharest, Romania	Romania	1–0	1–0	2023–24 UEFA Women's Nations League
14	31 October 2023	Stadion Šubićevac, Šibenik, Croatia	Croatia	1–0	2–0	2023–24 UEFA Women's Nations League
15	31 October 2023	Stadion Šubićevac, Šibenik, Croatia	Croatia	2–0	2–0	2023–24 UEFA Women's Nations League
