= Olga Ahtinen =

Finnish footballer (born 1997)

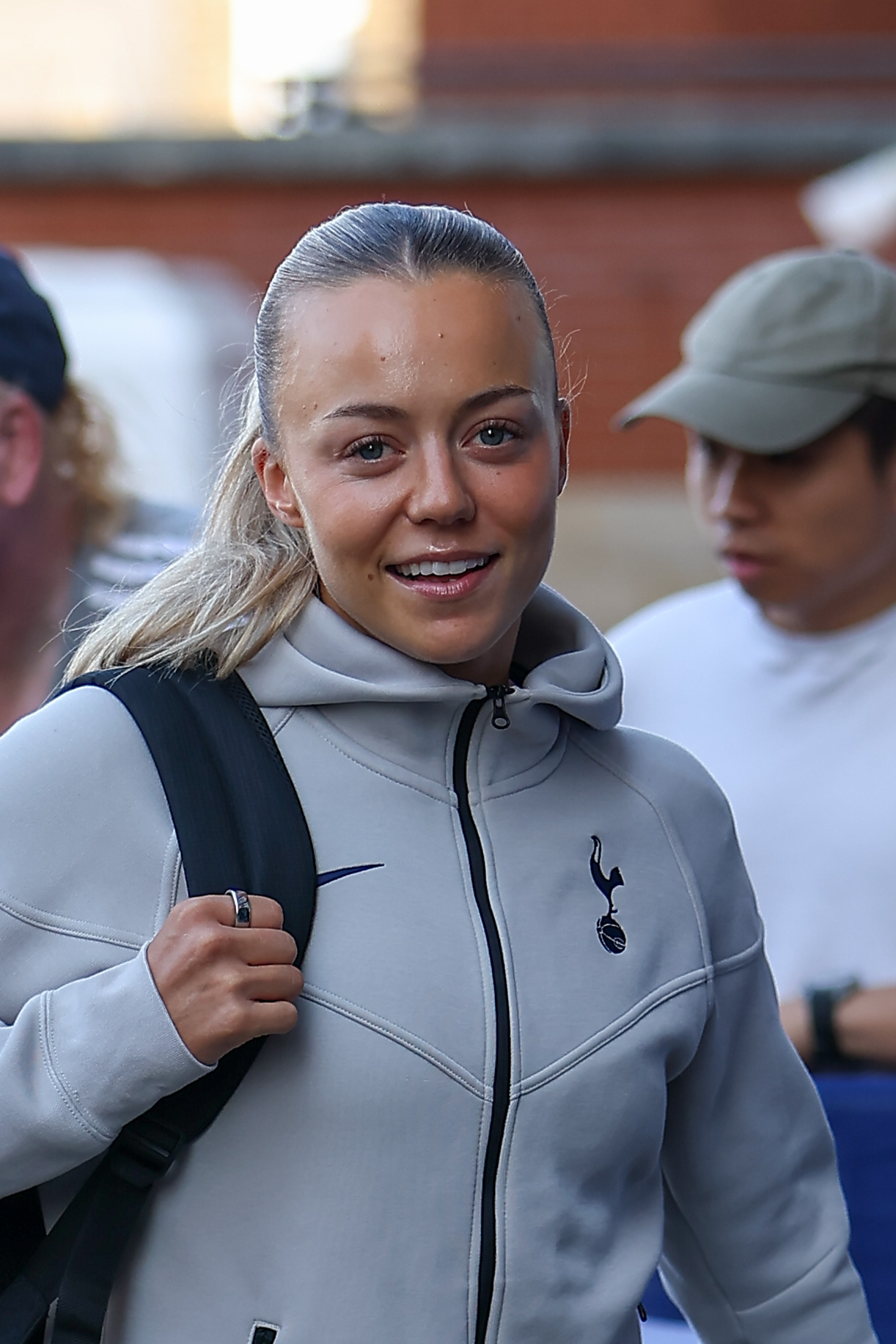
- Ahtinen with Tottenham Hotspur in 2025

Personal information
- Full name: Olga Adela Ahtinen
- Date of birth: 15 August 1997 (age 29)
- Place of birth: Kokkola, Finland
- Height: 1.64 m (5 ft 5 in)
- Position: Midfielder

Team information
- Current team: Tottenham Hotspur
- Number: 20

Senior career*
Years	Team	Apps	(Gls)
2013	GBK	10	(1)
2014	Kokkola Futis 10	23	(3)
2015–2016	Pallokissat	46	(8)
2017	PK-35 Vantaa	16	(3)
2017–2019	Brøndby IF	45	(13)
2019	IF Limhamn Bunkeflo	14	(0)
2020–2023	Linköpings FC	64	(7)
2023–	Tottenham Hotspur	44	(3)

International career^{‡}
2017–	Finland	80	(4)
- * Club domestic league appearances and goals as of 07:52, 14 September 2026 (UTC) ‡ National team caps and goals as of 15:18, 17 May 2026 (UTC)

Olga Adela Ahtinen (Finnish: [ˈolɡɑ ˈɑhtinen]; born 15 August 1997) is a Finnish professional footballer who plays as a midfielder for Women's Super League club Tottenham Hotspur and the Finland national team.

She started her career with GBK Kokkola and was playing for Swedish side Linköpings FC during Euro 2022.

== Career ==
Ahtinen is one of six players from GBK Kokkola who have made their debut for the Finland national team. In 2014, she joined another local club Kokkola Futis 10.

On 13 December 2016, Ahtinen was announced at PK-35 Vantaa. On 19 August 2017, it was announced that Ahtinen would be joining her new club in a week.

Ahtinen made six appearances in the UEFA Women's Champions League, as well as winning the Women's Cup in 2018 and the Danish Women's League in 2019 during her time at Brøndby IF.

On 19 July 2019, Ahtinen was announced at IF Limhamn Bunkeflo.

Ahtinen was named The Most Valuable Player of the 2021 Damallsvenskan season.

=== Tottenham Hotspur ===
In August 2023, Ahtinen signed with Tottenham Hotspur. She scored her first goal for Tottenham on 8 October 2023, in a 3–1 home victory against Bristol City. In a 1–1 draw with Liverpool F.C. Women saw her stretched off. It was announced she had damaged her MCL, but would not require surgery.

== International career ==
Ahtinen was capped by the Finland national team in 2017, and she appeared for the team during the 2019 FIFA Women's World Cup qualifying cycle.

She played for Finland at the UEFA Women's Euro 2022.

On 19 June 2025, Ahtinen was called up to the Finland squad for the UEFA Women's Euro 2025.

== Career statistics ==
=== Club ===
As of match played 13 September 2026

Appearances and goals by club, season and competition
Club	Season	League			National cup (Note: Includes Finnish Women's Cup, Danish Women's Cup, Svenska cupen women, Women's FA Cup)		League cup (Note: Includes FA Women's League Cup)		Continental (Note: Includes UEFA Women's Champions League)		Total	
Club	Season	Division	Apps	Goals	Apps	Goals	Apps	Goals	Apps	Goals	Apps	Goals
GBK	2013	Kansallinen Liiga	10	1	0	0	—		—		10	1
Kokkola Futis 10	2014	Kansallinen Liiga	23	3	1	0	—		—		24	3
Pallokissat	2015	Kansallinen Liiga	23	4	3	2	—		—		26	6
Pallokissat	2016	Kansallinen Liiga	23	4	4	0	—		—		27	4
Pallokissat			46	8	7	2	0	0	0	0	53	10
PK-35 Vantaa	2017	Kansallinen Liiga	16	3	0	0	—		0	0	16	3
Brøndby	2017–18	Danish Women's League	22	8	6	1	—		2	0	30	9
Brøndby	2018–19	Danish Women's League	23	5	5	0	—		4	0	32	5
Brøndby			45	13	11	1	0	0	6	0	62	14
Limhamn Bunkeflo	2019	Damallsvenskan	14	0	0	0	—		—		14	0
Linköping	2020	Damallsvenskan	20	0	1	0	—		—		21	0
Linköping	2021	Damallsvenskan	17	0	4	0	—		—		21	0
Linköping	2022	Damallsvenskan	22	5	4	0	—		—		26	5
Linköping	2023	Damallsvenskan	7	2	4	0	—		—		11	2
Linköping	Total		64	7	13	0	0	0	0	0	79	7
Tottenham Hotspur	2023–24	Women's Super League	16	1	4	0	0	0	—		20	1
Tottenham Hotspur	2024–25	Women's Super League	12	1	1	0	3	0	—		16	1
Tottenham Hotspur	2025–26	Women's Super League	15	1	2	0	3	0	—		20	1
Tottenham Hotspur	2026–27	Women's Super League	1	0	0	0	0	0	—		1	0
Tottenham Hotspur	Total		44	3	7	0	6	0	0	0	57	3
Career total			262	38	39	3	6	0	6	0	315	41

=== International ===
As of match played 18 April 2026

Appearances and goals by national team and year
National team	Year	Apps	Goals
Finland	2017	9	0
Finland	2018	11	1
Finland	2019	9	2
Finland	2020	1	0
Finland	2021	5	0
Finland	2022	13	0
Finland	2023	9	1
Finland	2024	11	0
Finland	2025	9	0
Finland	2026	2	0
Total		80	4

Scores and results list Finland's goal tally first, score column indicates score after each Ahtinen goal.

List of international goals scored by Olga Ahtinen
No.	Date	Venue	Opponent	Score	Result	Competition
1.	12 June 2018	Yongchuan Sports Center, Chongqing, China	China	1–0	1–2	2018 Yongchuan International Tournament
2.	1 March 2019	AEK Arena – Georgios Karapatakis, Larnaca, Cyprus	Czech Republic	1–0	1–2	2019 Cyprus Women's Cup
3.	6 March 2019	Paralimni Stadium, Paralimni, Cyprus	South Africa	3–0	3–0	2019 Cyprus Women's Cup
4.	16 February 2023	GSZ Stadium, Larnaca, Cyprus	Croatia	3–1	4–1	2023 Cyprus Women's Cup
