= Milly Boughton =

Soccer player (born 2006)

Personal information
- Full name: Milly Isabelle Boughton
- Date of birth: 3 February 2006 (age 20)
- Place of birth: South London, England
- Position: Midfielder

Team information
- Current team: Hibernian
- Number: 7

Youth career
- –2022: Football NSW Institute
- 2022: West Ham United

Senior career*
Years	Team	Apps	(Gls)
2022–2023	West Ham United	0	(0)
2023–2024	Tottenham Hotspur	0	(0)
2023–2024	→ Ipswich Town (loan)		
2024–2025	Arsenal	0	(0)
2025–	Hibernian	6	(0)
2026–	→ Motherwell (loan)	3	(4)

International career^{‡}
2023–	Australia U20	8	(0)
2024–	Australia U23	2	(0)
- * Club domestic league appearances and goals as of 8 April 2026 ‡ National team caps and goals as of 10 August 2025

Milly Isabelle Boughton (born 3 February 2006) is a professional soccer player who plays as a midfielder for the Scottish Women's Premier League (SWPL) club Motherwell, on loan from Hibernian. Born in England, she represents Australia at an under-20 and an under-23 international. She is regarded as an emerging young talent.

== Early life ==
Boughton was born on 3 February 2006 in South London. She moved to New South Wales when she was two years old. When she was 12 years old, her younger brother Jack was born.

Boughton has always been passionate about soccer, education and family. She attended Westfields Sports High School in the Greater Western Sydney suburb of Fairfield West and played for the Football NSW Institute. This was until she moved back to London for family reasons, where she trialled for West Ham United. She was later selected by Tottenham Hotspur to play for their academy.

== Club career ==
=== West Ham United ===
After moving back to London in 2022, Boughton trialled for West Ham United. Initially training with the under-21s, she eventually began training with the first team. In her first season at the club's academy, she scored eight goals in 12 matches.

=== Tottenham Hotspur ===
In 2023, Boughton was selected to play for Tottenham Hotspur, where she was an academy player but gradually started to train with the first team.

Boughton made her debut for Tottenham's first team on 22 November 2023, when she was substituted on in the 78th minute of Tottenham's 3–0 victory at home over Bristol City in the 2023–24 Women's League Cup.

=== Ipswich Town ===
In 2024, Boughton joined Ipswich Town from Tottenham Hotspur on dual registration, alongside fellow Tottenham midfielder Elkie Bowyer.

=== Arsenal ===
In 2024, after returning from her loan spell at Ipswich Town, Boughton joined Tottenham Hotspur's arch-rivals Arsenal. She played for the Arsenal Academy for just one season. She did not train with the senior team, but became the fourth Australian at the club, with senior Matildas Steph Catley, Kyra Cooney-Cross and Caitlin Foord already playing for the North London side. Boughton left Arsenal at the end of the 2024-25 season, after winning the PGA Under-21 League One Division and PGA Under-21 South Division with the Young Gunners side.

=== Hiberian ===
On 3 September 2025, it was announced that Boughton had signed a two-year contract, her first professional contract, with Scottish Women's Premier League (SWPL) 2024–25 champions Hibernian Women.

=== Motherwell ===
During the 2025–26 season, Boughton went on loan to Motherwell until the end of the season.

== International career ==
Boughton has represented Australia as a youth international at both an under-20 and under-23 level. She was first called up in 2023 for qualifiers for the 2024 AFC U-20 Women's Asian Cup, before eventually making the 25-player squad for the tournament in Uzbekistan, where Australia finished third.
