= Robert Vilahamn =

Swedish football coach (born 1983)

- Vilahamn in 2026

Personal information
- Full name: Jan Robert Vilahamn
- Date of birth: 2 January 1983 (age 43)
- Place of birth: Skalhamn, Sweden
- Position: Forward

Team information
- Current team: Portland Thorns (head coach)

Youth career
- –2000: Lysekils FF
- 2000–2002: IFK Göteborg

Senior career*
| Years | Team | Apps | (Gls) |
| 2002–2004 | IFK Göteborg | | |
| 2003 | → Bodens BK (loan) | 9 | (2) |
| 2004–2006 | FC Trollhättan | | |
| 2006–2007 | Qviding FIF | | |
| 2007–2015 | Ytterby IS | | |

Managerial career
- 2009–2015: Ytterby IS
- 2016–2017: Örgryte IS (U19)
- 2018–2019: Qviding FIF
- 2020–2021: BK Häcken (assistant)
- 2022–2023: BK Häcken women
- 2023–2025: Tottenham Hotspur women
- 2026–: Portland Thorns
- * Club domestic league appearances and goals

Jan Robert Vilahamn, (Swedish: [jɑːn ˈrǒːbɛʈ ˈvîːlaˌhamn]; né Karlsson [ˈkɑ̌ːɭsɔn]; born 2 January 1983) is a Swedish professional football coach and former player who is the head coach of Portland Thorns FC of the National Women's Soccer League (NWSL). He was the head coach of Tottenham Hotspur in the Women's Super League from 2023 to 2025.

== Playing career ==
Vilahamn started his career as a football player at Lysekils FF. He was signed by IFK Göteborg in 2000. After two seasons on the reserve team, he played a season and a half with the senior team in the top-tier Allsvenskan. Vilahamn played three national team matches and scored one goal for the national youth team. In the fall of 2003 he went on loan to Bodens BK in the Swedish second tier, Superettan, where he played 9 matches and scored 2 goals, helping Bodens BK continue in Superettan.

Vilahamn played for FC Trollhättan from 2004 to 2006, leaving for Superettan outfit Qviding FIF in 2006. In 2007, he joined Ytterby IS in the Swedish third tier. He scored 27 goals in 22 matches, making him the top goal scorer in the division and also winning the Swedish Golden Boot (Svenska Guldskon) as the highest goal-scorer in Sweden from the Premiership (Allsvenskan) down to the third tier.

In 2008 Vilahamn won the third-tier title with Ytterby IS, scoring 15 goals in 22 matches. In the following year Vilahamn became a player-coach for Ytterby IS in the second tier, where he shared the coaching task with Martin Berggren. In his debut season as a coach for Ytterby IS, his team won the league and he also became, with Gabriel Altemark Vanneryr, the joint-top goal-scorer with 25 goals.

In 2010, after being promoted to "Division 1 Södra" (Division 1 South), Ytterby IS was relegated in its first season. Vilahamn scored 10 goals. Vilahamn was a player-coach during 2011 when Ytterby IS ended up 7th in Division 2.

Between 2012 and 2014, Vilahamn was a playing assistant coach to Håkan Sandberg. Vilahamn was mostly a central midfielder during these years, and Ytterby IS spent most of the time in the lower half of the table. In 2015, Vilahamn retired from playing to focus on his new head coaching role with Ytterby IS.

== Coaching career ==
=== BK Häcken ===
In 2020, Vilahamn was appointed as assistant coach for BK Häcken in the Swedish Premiership Allsvenskan, where he helped the club to qualify for the Europa Conference League.

In the fall of 2021, Vilahamn was appointed head coach of the women's side BK Häcken FF. Under Vilahamn, BK Häcken qualified for UEFA Women's Champions League as runners up in the Swedish Premiership Damallsvenskan, and reached the Swedish Cup final in 2022 and 2023.

=== Tottenham Hotspur ===
On 7 July 2023, Women's Super League club Tottenham Hotspur announced Vilahamn as their new head coach for 2023–24 season. Vilahamn left his former club BK Häcken FF at the top of the table of Swedish Premiership Damallsvenskan after 17 rounds. After leading Tottenham to their first-ever Women's FA Cup final and a sixth place finish in the league during his first season in charge, Vilahamn signed a new three-year contract with the club in July 2024.

On 8 June 2025, the club announced he had been sacked after a series of poor performances.

=== Portland Thorns ===
On 4 March 2026, National Women's Soccer League club Portland Thorns FC announced Vilahamn as their new head coach for 2026 season. Delayed by work visa issues, Vilahamn didn't have pre-season training with the team, arriving with the team only two days before their first game.

== Personal life ==
Vilahamn is the younger brother of Fredrik Risp. In 2016, he founded the Vilahamn Soccer Academy.

Vilahamn is married and has twin children.
