= Drew Spence =

Jamaican footballer (born 1992)

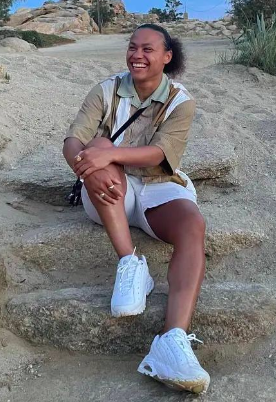
- Spence in 2022

Personal information
- Full name: Drew Meigan Spence
- Date of birth: 23 October 1992 (age 34)
- Place of birth: London, England
- Height: 1.65 m (5 ft 5 in)
- Position: Midfielder

Team information
- Current team: Tottenham Hotspur
- Number: 24

Youth career
- Arsenal
- Fulham

Senior career*
Years	Team	Apps	(Gls)
2008–2022	Chelsea	147	(20)
2022–	Tottenham Hotspur	74	(8)

International career^{‡}
2015	England	1	(0)
2021–	Jamaica	27	(4)
Medal record
Representing Jamaica
CONCACAF W Championship
Third place	2022 Mexico
- * Club domestic league appearances and goals as of 07:53, 14 September 2026 (UTC) ‡ National team caps and goals as of 09:22, April 19, 2026 (UTC)

Drew Meigan Spence (born 23 October 1992) is a professional footballer who plays as a midfielder for and captains Women's Super League club Tottenham Hotspur. Born in England she played for the England national football team in 2015, and as of 2021, represents Jamaica.

== Club career ==
=== Chelsea ===
Chelsea and England teammate Gilly Flaherty recalled playing alongside Spence in the Arsenal Centre of Excellence. Spence progressed to Fulham's youth team, before signing for Chelsea in 2008.

Spence and Chelsea reached the FA Women's Cup final for the first time in 2012, but were eventually beaten by Birmingham City in a penalty shootout after twice taking the lead in a 2–2 draw. Spence's effort was saved by Becky Spencer. In 2015, Spence won her first ever major trophy, in the 2015 FA Women's Cup Final at Wembley Stadium. Spence secured her first FA WSL title as her team beat Sunderland 4–0 in October 2015 to secure the League and Cup "double". At the end of the season Spence signed a new two-year contract with Chelsea.

During a 5–0 thrashing by Arsenal in October 2018, Spence left Kim Little nursing a broken leg with what Arsenal's website described as a "heavy tackle". The match officials were criticised for failing to send off Spence, who left Little ruled out for around ten weeks. In 2020 Spence signed a new contract that saw her stay with Chelsea until June 2022.

=== Tottenham Hotspur ===
In June 2022, Spence signed a two-year contract with Tottenham Hotspur, leaving Chelsea as their longest serving player. On 10 December 2025, it was announced Spence had signed a new long-term contract with the club.

On 22 August 2026, Spence was named as Tottenham's captain.

On 1 November 2026, Spence set a new record for the most appearances in the Women's Super League, making her 217th appearance in the competition across her time with Chelsea and Tottenham Hotspur.

== International career ==
=== England ===
Spence was born in England to a Jamaican father and English mother. National coach Mark Sampson gave Spence her first senior call up in October 2015, in an understrength squad for the 2015 Yongchuan International Tournament. She won her first and only England cap on 23 October 2015, as a substitute in England's 2–1 defeat to China in Chongqing.

In September 2017, Spence's Chelsea team-mate Eniola Aluko was pursuing allegations of racial discrimination against The FA through the pages of The Guardian newspaper. Spence was drawn into the controversy when she was revealed as the previously anonymous "The Player" who was said to have been "upset and offended" by Mark Sampson on the trip to China.

In November 2022, Spence was recognized by The Football Association as one of the England national team's legacy players, and as the 192nd women's player to be capped by England.

=== Jamaica ===
Spence qualified for Jamaica through her heritage and made her debut on 24 October 2021. At the 2023 Women's World Cup, Spence featured for Jamaica as they reached the knockout stages for the first time in their history.

== Career statistics ==
=== Club ===
As of match played 13 September 2026

Appearances and goals by club, season and competition
Club	Season	League			National cup (Note: Includes Women's FA Cup)		League cup (Note: Includes FA Women's Premier League Cup, Women's League Cup)		Continental		Total	
Club	Season	Division	Apps	Goals	Apps	Goals	Apps	Goals	Apps	Goals	Apps	Goals
Chelsea	2008–09	FA Women's Premier League	0	0	1	1	0	0	—		1	1
Chelsea	2009–10	FA Women's Premier League	10	3	2	1	1	0	—		13	4
Chelsea	2011	Women's Super League	9	1	1	0	1	0	—		11	1
Chelsea	2012	Women's Super League	6	0	2	0	2	0	—		10	0
Chelsea	2013	Women's Super League	11	1	1	0	0	0	—		12	1
Chelsea	2014	Women's Super League	10	0	0	0	3	2	—		13	2
Chelsea	2015	Women's Super League	13	2	4	0	5	0	3	0	25	2
Chelsea	2016	Women's Super League	11	2	4	1	1	0	1	0	17	3
Chelsea	2017	Women's Super League	7	4	3	3	—		—		10	7
Chelsea	2017–18	Women's Super League	14	2	4	1	5	3	7	1	30	7
Chelsea	2018–19	Women's Super League	17	1	3	1	6	6	7	3	33	11
Chelsea	2019–20	Women's Super League	15	3	2	2	6	2	—		23	7
Chelsea	2020–21	Women's Super League	8	0	2	3	2	0	3	0	15	3
Chelsea	2021–22	Women's Super League	16	1	3	1	3	0	1	0	23	2
Chelsea	Total		147	20	32	14	35	13	22	4	236	51
Tottenham Hotspur	2022–23	Women's Super League	22	3	2	1	4	1	—		28	5
Tottenham Hotspur	2023–24	Women's Super League	12	2	2	0	1	0	—		15	2
Tottenham Hotspur	2024–25	Women's Super League	19	3	0	0	2	0	—		21	3
Tottenham Hotspur	2025–26	Women's Super League	19	0	2	1	3	1	—		24	2
Tottenham Hotspur	2026–27	Women's Super League	2	0	0	0	0	0	—		2	0
Tottenham Hotspur	Total		74	8	6	2	10	2	0	0	90	12
Career total			221	28	38	16	45	15	22	4	326	63

=== International ===
As of match played 18 April 2026

Appearances and goals by national team and year
National team	Year	Apps	Goals
Jamaica	2021	2	1
Jamaica	2022	7	1
Jamaica	2023	8	0
Jamaica	2024	5	2
Jamaica	2025	1	0
Jamaica	2026	3	0
Total		27	4

Scores and results list Jamaica's goal tally first, score column indicates score after each Spence goal.

List of international goals scored by Drew Spence
No.	Date	Venue	Opponent	Score	Result	Competition
1	22 October 2021	Chase Stadium, Fort Lauderdale, Florida, US	Costa Rica	1–0	1–0	Friendly
2	11 July 2022	Estadio BBVA, Guadalupe, Mexico	Haiti	4–0	4–0	2022 CONCACAF W Championship
3	26 September 2023	BMO Field, Toronto, Canada	Canada	1–0	1–2	CONCACAF Olympic Play-in
4	2 December 2024	Catherine Hall Sports Complex, Montego Bay, Jamaica	South Africa	2–1	3–2	Friendly

== Personal life ==
Spence's brother Lewwis Spence is also a professional footballer.

Spence spoke on a podcast in 2020 about being part of the LGBT+ community.

== Honours ==
Chelsea

- FA Women's Super League (5): 2015, 2017–18, 2019–20, 2020–21, 2021–22
- FA WSL Spring Series (1): 2017
- Women's FA Cup (4): 2014–15, 2017–18, 2020–21, 2021–22
- FA Women's League Cup (2): 2019–20, 2020–21
- Women's FA Community Shield (1): 2020

Individual

- CONCACAF W Championship Best XI: 2022
