= Vicky Jepson =

English football manager (born 1987)

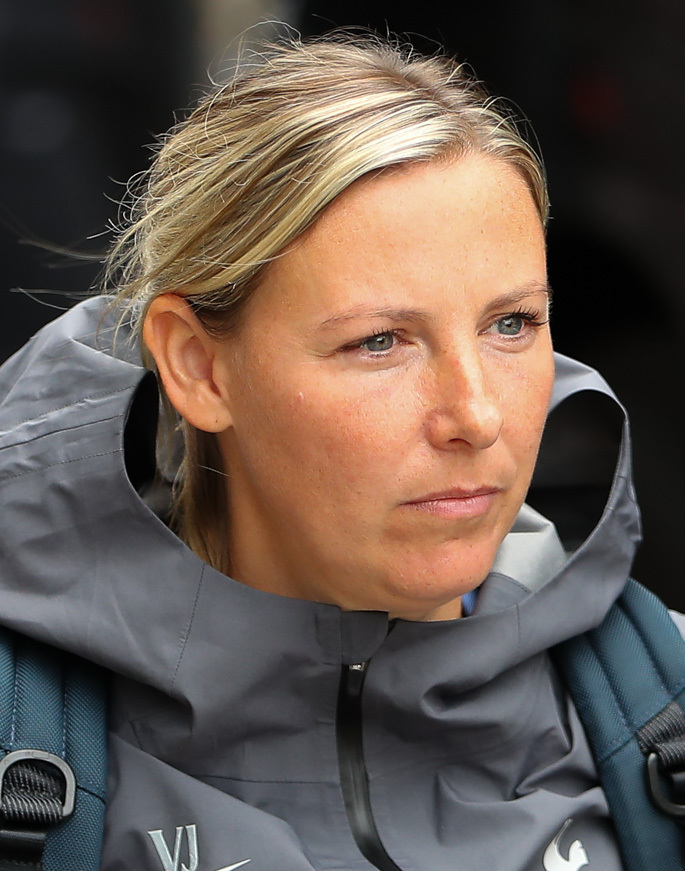
- Jepson in 2024

Personal information
- Full name: Victoria Jayne Jepson
- Date of birth: 23 February 1987 (age 39)
- Place of birth: Macclesfield, England

Managerial career
- Years: Team
- 2018–2021: Liverpool
- 2023: Tottenham Hotspur (interim)
- 2025–: United States Women's U20

Victoria Jayne Jepson (born 23 February 1987) is an English professional football coach and manager who is currently the head coach of the United States Women's U20. She previously served as senior assistant head coach of Women's Super League club Tottenham Hotspur, where she was also the club's assistant coach and had a spell as interim head coach. She managed Liverpool in both the WSL and Women's Championship from 2018 to 2021.

== Career history ==
=== Liverpool ===
She started working at Liverpool in 2009 holding various roles including coaching across the entire elite girls pathway from u11s up to the u21s squad whilst holding coach education courses with the Premier League abroad in Indonesia, China, Hong Kong and Qatar . In addition she has worked for The FA at their girls' excellence camps which help to develop the country's best younger players. In 2014, Jepson was nominated for the FA Female Development Coach of the Year, and won the award the following year after transitioning several youth players into the senior Liverpool FC Women's Squad.

Jepson was appointed assistant manager to Neil Redfearn at Liverpool in June 2018. After just one game, Redfearn departed the club, leaving Jepson as part of the interim managerial team headed by Chris Kirkland. On 26 October 2018, Jepson was appointed as first team manager on a permanent basis. Jepson's first game in charge was a 1–0 victory against Hope Powell's Brighton Hove Albion. Liverpool finished the season 8th out of 12 teams in the league.

The following season, Liverpool were relegated from the Women's Super League on sporting merit after The FA Board's decision to award places on a points-per-game basis following the curtailment of the season eight games early due to the COVID-19 pandemic. Liverpool had won one game, picking up six points from 14 games during the 2019–20 FA WSL.

She continued with the team following relegation until, on 12 January 2021, Liverpool announced that Jepson had left the club by mutual consent with the team sat in third place in the Championship.

=== Tottenham Hotspur ===
Jepson joined Tottenham Hotspur as assistant coach to Rehanne Skinner in July 2021. In March 2023, she was named interim head coach following the firing of Skinner. Jepson was appointed senior assistant head coach to Robert Vilahamn at Tottenham on 26 July 2023.

=== United States Women's U20 ===
On May 2, 2025, the United States Soccer Federation announced Jepson as the United States Women's U20 new head coach.

== Personal life ==
Born in Bollington, she attended Tytherington High School. Jepson then attended Macclesfield College and coached at Macclesfield Town.

== Managerial statistics ==
All competitive games (league and domestic cups) are included.

As of 27 May 2023

Managerial record by team and tenure
Team	From	To	Record							
Team	From	To	P	W	D	L	GF	GA	GD	Win %
Liverpool	26 October 2018	12 January 2021	57	18	9	30	84	84	+0	31.58
Tottenham Hotspur (interim)	13 March 2023	7 July 2023	8	2	3	3	14	17	−3	25.00
Career total			65	20	12	33	98	101	−3	30.77
