= Amy James-Turner =

English footballer

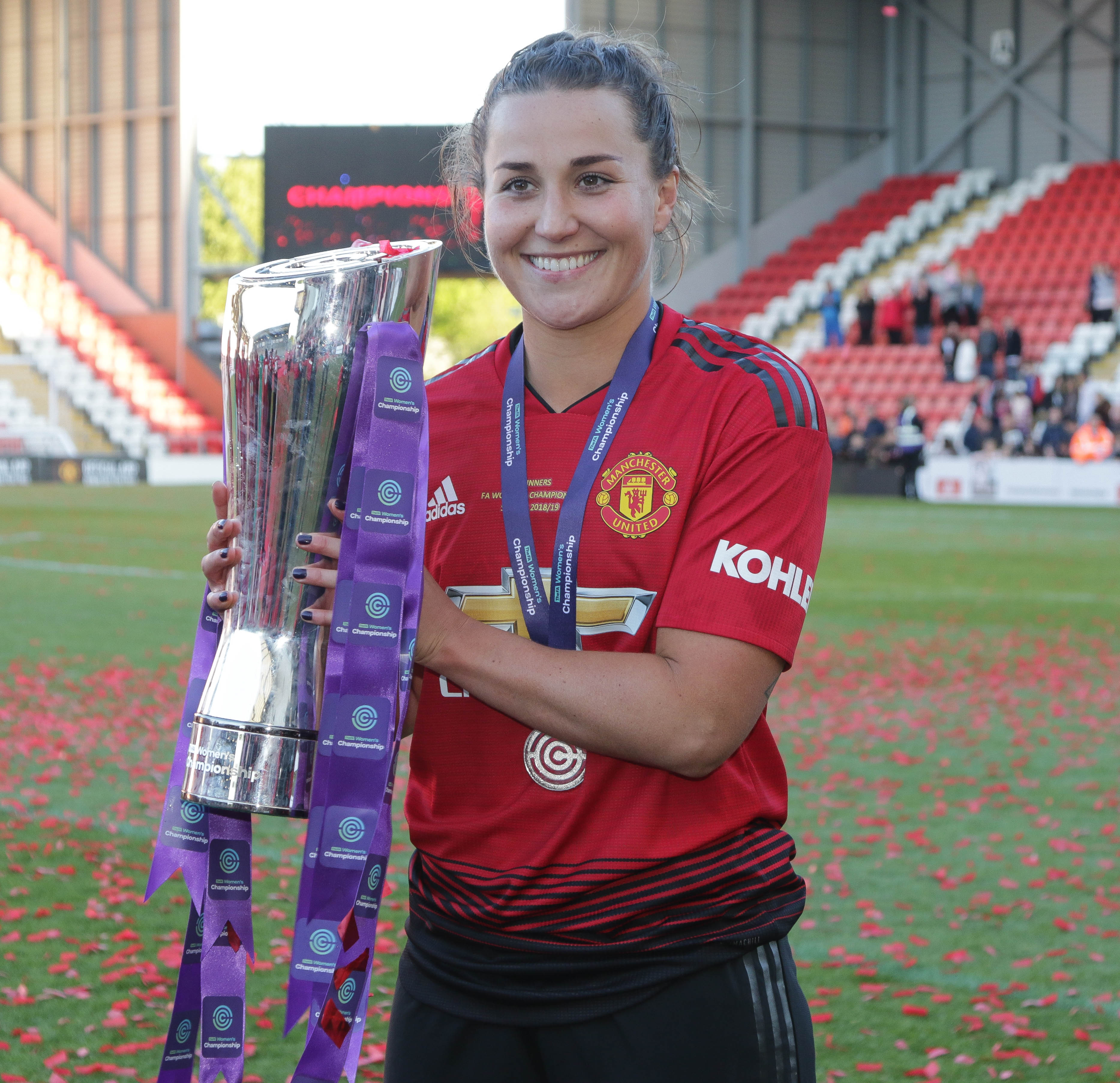
- Amy James-Turner with the FA Women's Championship trophy after winning it with Manchester United in 2019

Personal information
- Birth name: Amy Turner
- Date of birth: 4 July 1991 (age 35)
- Place of birth: Sheffield, England
- Height: 5 ft 5 in (1.65 m)
- Position: Defender

Youth career
- Sheffield Wednesday
- Sheffield United

College career
Years	Team	Apps	(Gls)
2009–2010	Hofstra Pride	41	(4)

Senior career*
Years	Team	Apps	(Gls)
2007–2009	Doncaster Rovers Belles		
2011	Doncaster Rovers Belles	4	(0)
2011–2012	Leeds United	19	(0)
2012–2013	Sheffield	6	(0)
2013–2017	Lincoln Ladies/Notts County	47	(0)
2017–2018	Liverpool	6	(0)
2018–2021	Manchester United	50	(2)
2021–2022	Orlando Pride	15	(1)
2022–2026	Tottenham Hotspur	37	(1)

International career
2014	England U23	3	(0)
2015	England	4	(0)
- * Club domestic league appearances and goals

Amy James-Turner (née Turner; born 4 July 1991) is an English former professional footballer who played as a defender. Capped four times for the England national team, Turner previously played for Manchester United, Liverpool, Lincoln Ladies/Notts County, Sheffield, Leeds United, Doncaster Rovers Belles, the Orlando Pride, and Tottenham Hotspur.

== Early life ==
Amy Turner was born on 4 July 1991 in Sheffield, and grew up in the nearby town Stocksbridge. She has a sister, Lucy, who is also a footballer and was the captain of Barnsley. Their father and grandfather were also footballers, with the latter having played for the Armed Forces team during World War II.

== Youth career ==
James-Turner joined the girl's academy of local club Sheffield Wednesday at the age of eight, and progressed to the side's under-16 team. During the same period of time, she played for Sheffield United's academy.

== Club career ==
=== Early and college career, 2007–13 ===
==== Doncaster Rover Belles, 2007–09 ====
James-Turner joined FA Women's Premier League club Doncaster Rovers Belles at the age of 16.

==== Hofstra Pride, 2009–10 ====
Having played in the 2009 FA Women's Premier League Cup final, a match which was broadcast in America, James-Turner was contacted by Simon Riddiough, the Barnsley-born coach of college soccer team Hofstra Pride. Riddiough invited James-Turner to study at Hofstra University and play National Collegiate Athletic Association (NCAA) college soccer for the team. She played two seasons as a centre-back for Hofstra Pride, making 41 appearances and scoring 4 goals. As a rookie, James-Turner was named to the Colonial Athletic Association (now known as the Coastal Athletic Association) all-rookie team.

==== Return to Doncaster and release: 2011 ====
James-Turner returned to Doncaster Rover Belles for the inaugural 2011 FA WSL season, but was released after being informed she "wasn't good enough" to play at that level.

==== Leeds United, 2011–12 ====
Following her release from Doncaster, James-Turner joined Leeds United to rebuild match minutes and her confidence.

==== Sheffield, 2012–13 ====
After a season at Leeds, James-Turned joined Sheffield.

=== Lincoln Ladies/Notts County, 2013–17 ===
In 2013, James-Turner returned to the WSL, joining Lincoln Ladies. She was a member of the team's inaugural season under their rebranded form, Notts County. James-Turner signed a new two-year contract in January 2015. She played in the 2015 FA Cup final at Wembley Stadium; Notts County were defeated 1–0 by Chelsea. In April 2015, James-Turner was shortlisted for the PFA Women's Young Player of the Year, but lost out to Leah Williamson. In late 2016, Turner suffered a knee injury that ruled her out of play for 15 months. The injury occurred during training and, after ''questionable'' support from Notts County, James-Turner's rehabilitation was overseen by the England national team. On 21 April 2017, two days before the start of the Spring Series, Notts County folded, leaving James-Turner without a club. She was informed of the team's dissolution by her teammates.

=== Liverpool, 2017–18 ===
On 16 May 2017, James-Turner signed for Liverpool. In January 2018, she made her Liverpool debut as substitute against Yeovil Town, her first appearance in over a year due to her injury. On 11 June 2018, Liverpool announced that James-Turner would be released following the expiration of her contract.

=== Manchester United, 2018–21 ===
On 13 July 2018, it was announced that James-Turner had signed with Manchester United for their inaugural season. On 19 August 2018, she made her competitive debut for United in a 1–0 League Cup victory against Liverpool, and her Championship debut came on 9 September, a 12–0 win over Aston Villa.

James-Turner scored her first goal for United on 28 April 2019 during a 5–0 away win over Millwall Lionesses. Ahead of the 2020–21 season, James-Turner signed a new one-year contract with an option for a further year.

=== Orlando Pride, 2021–22 ===
On 25 June 2021, James-Turner was signed by National Women's Soccer League (NWSL) club Orlando Pride to a two-year contract with an option for an additional season. Her signing was completed using allocation money. In the same summer, her partner, Angharad James-Turner, joined rival NWSL club North Carolina Courage. On 4 July 2021, James-Turner made her debut for the Orlando Pride as an 80th-minute substitute in a 2–0 defeat to the North Carolina Courage. On 17 June 2022, it was announced James-Turner's contract had been bought out by the Pride and she was released.

=== Tottenham Hotspur, 2022–26 ===
On 27 July 2022, James-Turner returned to England where she joined Tottenham Hotspur on a two-year contract with the option for a further year.

On 19 September 2024, James-Turner extended her contract until 2026.

On 17 May 2025, James-Turner shared a message via her Instagram profile where she stated she had ''been trying to work through something'' for the prior six months, and that she was advised by medical professionals to take time away from football.

In April 2026, it was announced that James-Turner would depart Tottenham at the end of the season following the expiration of her contract. In the announcement, Tottenham sent ''love and strength'' to James-Turner and her family for their ''personal journey [...] and for the future.'' James-Turner made 53 appearances across all competitions for Tottenham during the length of her tenure. On 12 September 2026, James-Turner announced her retirement from competitive play.

== International career ==
James-Turner represented England at under-23 level. She was called up to the senior squad for the first time for the 2015 Cyprus Cup after Casey Stoney withdrew with an injury. James-Turner made her international debut in a 3–0 win against Australia in March 2015, coming on as a substitute for the final two minutes. She made her full debut in the team's next match against Netherlands. James-Turner made a further two appearances, starting and playing the full 90 minutes against Estonia in September and Bosnia and Herzegovina in November 2015 during UEFA Women's Euro 2017 qualifying as England kept a clean sheet in both victories.

James-Turner was allotted 188 when the FA announced their legacy numbers scheme to honour the 50th anniversary of England’s inaugural international.

== Post-footballing career ==
On 1 May 2026, James-Turner was announced as the Female Programming Coordinator and Coach for player development club Seattle United.

== Off the pitch ==
=== Advocacy ===
James-Turner is an ambassador for Planet League, a fan-engagement platform; in 2024, she composed a report on ''the voice of women's football on climate.''

In 2020, James-Turner and her partner, Angharad James-Turner, organised a virtual cycling challenge between Sheffield and Pembrokeshire, their respective hometowns, to raise money for a number of charities ''very close to [their] hearts.''

=== Personal life ===
James-Turner is a qualified sports science teacher. She studied for an undergraduate degree at Sheffield Hallam University, and received her Postgraduate Certificate in Education (PGCE) from the University of Huddersfield.

On 23 December 2020, James-Turner announced her engagement to Wales international Angharad James. They married in June 2023, becoming the first married couple in the WSL. Following their wedding, both have been known by the double-barrelled married name. The couple own a mobile coffee van. They have a cockapoo named Betsy.

James-Turner has named Nemanja Vidić as her footballing hero.

== Career statistics ==
=== Club ===
As of match played 16 May 2026

Appearances and goals by club, season and competition
Club	Season	League			FA Cup (Note: Includes the Women's FA Cup and NWSL Challenge Cup)		League Cup (Note: Includes the WPL Cup and WSL Cup/Women's League Cup)		Total	
Club	Season	Division	Apps	Goals	Apps	Goals	Apps	Goals	Apps	Goals
Doncaster Rovers Belles	2011	Women's Super League	4	0	2	0	0	0	6	0
Leeds United	2011–12	WPL National	19	0	0	0	4	1	23	1
Sheffield	2012–13	WPL Northern	6	0	0	0	4	0	10	0
Sheffield	Total		29	0	2	0	8	1	39	1
Lincoln Ladies	2013	Women's Super League	11	0	0	0	4	0	15	0
Notts County	2014	Women's Super League	13	0	3	0	6	0	22	0
Notts County	2015	Women's Super League	14	0	4	0	8	0	26	0
Notts County	2016	Women's Super League	9	0	2	0	1	0	12	0
Notts County	Total		47	0	9	0	19	0	75	0
Liverpool	2017–18	Women's Super League	6	0	1	0	0	0	7	0
Manchester United	2018–19	Championship	16	2	2	0	6	0	24	2
Manchester United	2019–20	Women's Super League	13	0	1	0	5	1	19	1
Manchester United	2020–21	Women's Super League	21	0	1	1	2	0	24	1
Manchester United	Total		50	2	4	1	13	1	67	4
Orlando Pride	2021	NWSL	14	0	0	0	—		14	0
Orlando Pride	2022	NWSL	1	1	4	0	—		5	1
Orlando Pride	Total		15	1	4	0	0	0	19	1
Tottenham Hotspur	2022–23	Women's Super League	22	0	2	0	4	1	28	1
Tottenham Hotspur	2023–24	Women's Super League	14	1	4	0	5	0	23	1
Tottenham Hotspur	2024–25	Women's Super League	1	0	0	0	1	0	2	0
Tottenham Hotspur	2025–26	Women's Super League	0	0	0	0	0	0	0	0
Tottenham Hotspur	Total		37	1	6	0	10	1	53	2
Career total			184	4	26	1	50	3	260	8

=== International ===
As of 29 November 2015

Appearances and goals by national team and year
National team	Year	Apps	Goals
England	2015	4	0
Total		4	0

== Honours ==
Manchester United

- FA Women's Championship: 2018–19

Tottenham Hotspur

- Women's FA Cup runner-up: 2023–24

England

- Cyprus Cup: 2015
