= Eleanor Heeps =

English footballer (born 2003)

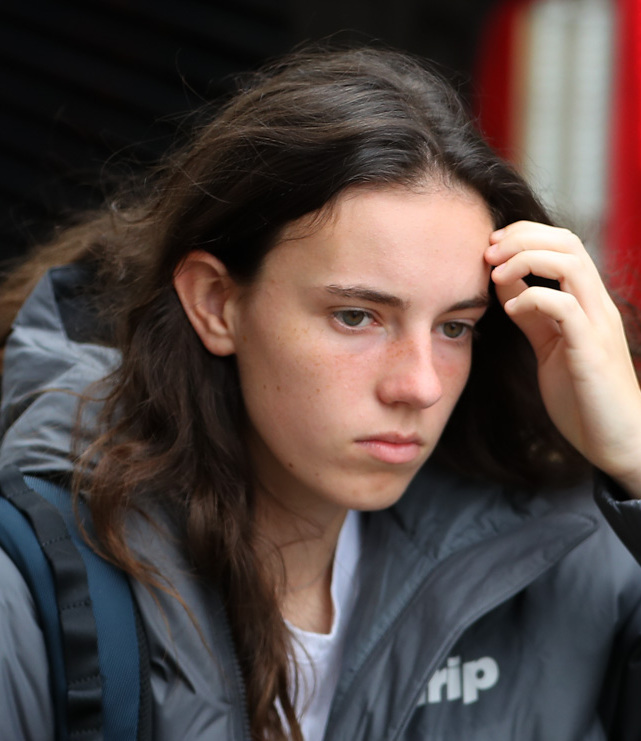
- Heeps in 2024

Personal information
- Birth name: Eleanor Caitlin Heeps
- Date of birth: 4 August 2003 (age 23)
- Place of birth: Crewe, England
- Height: 1.75 m (5 ft 9 in)
- Position: Goalkeeper

Team information
- Current team: Brighton & Hove Albion
- Number: 30

Youth career
- Sandbach United
- Stoke City
- 2016–2020: Liverpool

Senior career*
Years	Team	Apps	(Gls)
2020–2021	Liverpool	0	(0)
2021–2026	Tottenham Hotspur	2	(0)
2021–2022	→ Blackburn Rovers (loan)	4	(0)
2022–2023	→ Coventry United (loan)	10	(0)
2023	→ Sheffield United (loan)	1	(0)
2026–	Brighton & Hove Albion	0	(0)

International career^{‡}
2019–2021	England U17		
2020–2021	England U18	2	(0)
2021–2022	England U19	2	(0)
- * Club domestic league appearances and goals as of 30 June 2026 ‡ National team caps and goals as of 18 December 2024

Eleanor Caitlin Heeps (born 4 August 2003) is an English footballer who plays as a goalkeeper for Women's Super League club Brighton & Hove Albion. She previously played for fellow WSL side Tottenham Hotspur as well as Blackburn Rovers, Coventry United, and Sheffield United.

== Early years ==
Eleanor Caitlin Heeps (Note: downloaded from "The FA Publishes Football Agent Fees And Transactions Details". The FA.) was born on 4 August 2003 in Crewe, Cheshire. She attended Sandbach High School and Sixth Form College.

Heeps began playing football with local side Sandbach United, where she was initially an outfield player. At the age of 10, she joined Stoke City, trialling as both a goalkeeper and a striker, and being accepted as the former. She was shortlisted for Young Sports Achiever of the Year at the 2018 Everybody Awards. As a child, Heeps watched clips of goalkeepers David de Gea and Thibaut Courtois.

== Club career ==
=== Liverpool, 2016–2021 ===
Heeps spent five years with Liverpool, joining the academy at the under-14 age group and eventually progressing to the senior team.

=== Tottenham Hotspur, 2021–26 ===
On 13 August 2021, Heeps signed for Women's Super League team Tottenham Hotspur.

==== Loan to Blackburn Rovers, 2021–22 ====
After signing with Tottenham, Heeps was immediately loaned to Women's Championship club Blackburn Rovers for the 2021–22 season.

==== Loan to Coventry United, 2022–23 ====
On 22 September 2022, Heeps joined Women's Championship club Coventry United (now operating under the name Rugby Borough W.F.C.) on loan for the 2022–23 season. Coventry were relegated to the Women's National League at the end of the season.

==== Loan to Sheffield United, 2023–24 ====
On 21 October 2023, Heeps joined Sheffield United on a short-term loan running until January 2024. During her loan with Sheffield, she continued to train with Spurs on a part-time basis.

==== Return to Tottenham, 2024–26 ====
On 24 April 2024, Heeps signed a new three-year contract with Tottenham Hotspur. On 23 November 2024, Heeps made her debut for Spurs against Aston Villa in the 2024–25 League Cup, keeping a clean sheet in a 1–0 home win. On 8 December, she made her league debut against Everton and featured in the team's following three WSL matches where they went unbeaten.

On 15 April 2025, Heeps signed a new contract with Spurs, running until 2028.

=== Brighton & Hove Albion ===
On 30 June 2026, Heeps signed for Brighton & Hove Albion.

== International career ==
In October 2021, Heeps appeared in the England under-19 team's 2022 U19 Championship qualification matches against Northern Ireland and Switzerland, with England winning both matches and progressing to the second round of qualification.

On 12 February 2025, Heeps was called up to England's under-23 team for fixtures against Germany and France. On 26 March 2025, she was again called into the squad.

== Career statistics ==
=== Club ===
As of match played 16 May 2026

Appearances and goals by club, season and competition
Club	Season	League			FA cup		League cup		Total	
Club	Season	Division	Apps	Goals	Apps	Goals	Apps	Goals	Apps	Goals
Blackburn Rovers (loan)	2021–22	FA Women's Championship	4	0	0	0	0	0	4	0
Coventry United (loan)	2022–23	Women's Championship	10	0	0	0	0	0	10	0
Sheffield United (loan)	2023–24	Women's Championship	1	0	0	0	2	0	3	0
Tottenham Hotspur	2024–25	WSL	2	0	1	0	3	0	6	0
Tottenham Hotspur	2025–26	WSL	0	0	0	0	0	0	0	0
Tottenham Hotspur	Total		2	0	1	0	3	0	9	0
Brighton & Hove Albion	2026–27	WSL	0	0	0	0	0	0	0	0
Career total			17	0	1	0	5	0	23	0
