= 2013 Rugby World Cup Sevens squads – Men =

The rosters of all participating teams at the men's tournament of the 2013 Rugby World Cup Sevens.

== Pool A ==
=== Australia ===
Coach: (Australia) Michael O'Connor

1. Tom Cusack
2. Jesse Parahi
3. Sean McMahon
4. Bernard Foley
5. Matt Lucas
6. Con Foley
7. Cameron Clark
8. James Stannard
9. Ed Jenkins (c)
10. Lewis Holland
11. Luke Morahan
12. Shannon Walker

=== France ===
Coach: (France) Frédéric Pomarel

1. Vincent Deniau
2. Manoël Dall'igna
3. Jean-Baptiste Mazoué (c)
4. Terry Bouhraoua
5. Paul Albaladejo
6. Julien Jane
7. Jean-Marcellin Buttin
8. Jonathan Laugel
9. Steeve Barry
10. Julien Candelon
11. Jean-Baptiste Gobelet
12. Vincent Inigo

=== Spain ===
1. Ignacio Martin
2. Julen Goia
3. Javier Canosa
4. Pablo Feijoo (c)
5. Facundo Lavino
6. Martin Heredia
7. Pedro Martín
8. Jaike Carter
9. Javier Carrión
10. Glen Rolls
11. Matías Tudela
12. Marcos Poggi

=== Tunisia ===
1. Haithem Chelly
2. Sofiane Zaafouri
3. Khaled Zegden
4. Aymen Gloulou
5. Chemseddine Khalifa
6. Badie Dahmoul
7. Abbes Kherfani
8. Abdelmajid Zemzem
9. Chadi Jabri
10. Kais Aissa
11. Mohsen Essid
12. Mohamed Gara Ali (c)

== Pool B ==
=== Japan ===
Coach: (Japan) Tomohiro Segawa

1. Lote Daulako Tuqiri
2. Yusaku Kuwazuru
3. Lepuha Latuila
4. Opeti Faeamani
5. Daisuke Natsui
6. Katsuyuki Sakai (c)
7. Shuhei Narita
8. Shohei Toyosima
9. Kosuke Hoshino
10. Shota Emi
11. Seiyu Kohara
12. Kazushi Hano

=== Russia ===
1. Vladimir Ostroushko
2. Stanislav Bondarev
3. Vladislav Lazarenko
4. Ilya Babaev
5. Dmitry Perov (c)
6. Igor Klyuchnikov
7. Nikolay Goroshilov
8. Alexander Ianiushkin
9. Igor Galinovskiy
10. Vasily Artemyev
11. Denis Simplikevich
12. Victor Gresev

=== Scotland ===
Coach: (Scotland) Stephen Gemmell

1. Scott Riddell
2. Michael Fedo
3. Struan Dewar
4. Alex Glashan
5. Colin Gregor (c)
6. Christopher Dean
7. Andrew Turnbull
8. Colin Shaw
9. Jim Thompson
10. Michael Maltman
11. Mark Robertson
12. James M. Johnstone

=== South Africa ===
Coach: (South Africa) Paul Treu

1. Chris Dry
2. Philip Snyman
3. Ryno Benjamin
4. S'bura Sithole
5. Cornal Hendricks
6. Kyle Brown (c)
7. Branco du Preez
8. Stephan Dippenaar
9. Cheslin Kolbe
10. Cecil Afrika
11. Seabelo Senatla
12. Sampie Mastriet

== Pool C ==
=== Kenya ===
Coach: (England) Mike Friday

1. Horace Otieno
2. Oscar Ouma Achieng
3. Patrice Agunda
4. Felix Ayange
5. Eden Agero
6. Humphrey Kayange
7. Biko Adema
8. Andrew Amonde (c)
9. Michael Wanjala
10. Lavin Asego
11. Collins Injera
12. Willy Ambaka

=== Philippines ===
Coach: (United States) Al Caravelli

1. Andrew Wolff
2. Ryan Eugene Clarke
3. Oliver Saunders
4. Gareth Holgate
5. Jake Letts
6. Joseph Matthews
7. Justin Coveney
8. Kenneth Stern
9. Michael Letts (c)
10. Matthew Saunders (c)
11. Sean Lynch
12. Patrice Olivier

=== Samoa ===
Coach: (Samoa) Stephen Betham

1. Fa'atoina Autagavaia
2. Afa Aiono (c)
3. Alafoti Faosiliva
4. Fa'alemiga Selesele
5. Lio Lolo
6. Uale Mai
7. Lolo Lui
8. Alatasi Tupou
9. Rupeni Levasa
10. Ken Siaosi Pisi
11. Paul Perez
12. Tom Iosefo

=== Zimbabwe ===
Coach: (Zimbabwe) Gilbert Nyamutsamba

1. Fortunate Chipendu
2. Jacques Leitao (c)
3. Mike Morris
4. Kelvin Magunje
5. Lucky Sithole
6. Daniel Hondo
7. Tafadzwa Chitokwindo
8. Njabulo Ndlovu
9. Gardner Nechironga
10. Garth Zieglar
11. Tengai Nemadire
12. Wensley Mbanje

== Pool D ==
=== Canada ===
Coach: (Wales) Geraint John

1. Mike Fuailefau
2. Thyssen de Goede
3. Nanyak Dala
4. John Moonlight (c)
5. Justin Douglas
6. Sean Duke
7. Phil Mack
8. Lucas Hammond
9. Nathan Hirayama
10. Ciaran Hearn
11. Harry Jones
12. Taylor Paris

=== Georgia ===
Coach: (Georgia (country)) Kakhaber Alania

1. Zura Dzneladze
2. Giorgi Jimsheladze
3. Viktor Kolelishvili
4. Bidzina Samkharadze
5. Merab Kvirikashvili
6. Merab Sharikadze
7. Alexander Todua
8. Bakhva Kobakhidze
9. Revaz Gigauri
10. Shavleg Makharashvili
11. Irakli Gegenava
12. Giorgi Pruidze

=== New Zealand ===
Coach: (New Zealand) Gordon Tietjens

1. Pita Ahki
2. Tim Mikkelson
3. Sam Dickson
4. DJ Forbes (c)
5. Lote Raikabula
6. Junior Tomasi Cama
7. Scott Curry
8. Gillies Kaka
9. Sherwin Stowers
10. Waisake Naholo
11. Kurt Baker
12. David Raikuna
13. Bryce Heem

=== United States ===
Coach: (United States) Alexander Magleby

1. Carlin Isles
2. Nick Edwards
3. Andrew Durutalo
4. Shalom Suniula
5. Zack Test (c)
6. Matt Hawkins
7. Folau Niua
8. Jack Halalilo
9. Maka Unufe
10. Mike Palefau
11. Colin Hawley
12. Brett Thompson

== Pool E ==
=== Fiji ===
Coach: (Fiji) Alifereti Dere

1. Leone Nakarawa
2. Levani Botia (c)
3. Waisea Nayacalevu
4. Nemani Nagusa
5. Watisoni Votu
6. Joji Ragamate
7. Jasa Veremalua
8. Vereniki Goneva
9. Ilai Tinai
10. Alipate Ratini
11. Metuisela Talebula
12. Samisoni Viriviri

=== Tonga ===
1. Fe'ofa'aki Holoia
2. Fautasi Tonga Ma'u
3. Simana Halaifonua
4. Sione Filila Taufa
5. Pepa Koloamatangi
6. Kilifi Latu (c)
7. Siosaia Palei
8. Sosefo Maake
9. Sonatane Takulua
10. Tevita Tuipulotu
11. Fetongi Tuinauvai
12. Michael Toloke

=== Uruguay ===
1. Juan Ormaechea
2. Juan Martín Llovet
3. Alfonso Falcon
4. Agustín Ormaechea
5. Gabriel Puig (c)
6. Felipe Berchesi
7. Federico Favaro
8. Gastón Mieres
9. Santiago Gibernau
10. Ian Schmidt
11. Guillermo Lijtenstein
12. Francisco Vecino

=== Wales ===
Coach: (Wales) Paul John

1. Gareth Davies
2. Chris Knight
3. Lee Williams (c)
4. Alex Webber
5. Alex Walker
6. James Davies
7. Rhys Jones
8. Rhys Shellard
9. Adam Warren
10. Jason Harries
11. Craig Price
12. Adam Thomas

== Pool F ==
=== Argentina ===
Coach: (Argentina) Andrés Romagnoli

1. Nicolás Bruzzone
2. Valentin Cruz Hernestrosa
3. Jerónimo de la Fuente
4. Francisco Merello
5. Matías Moroni
6. Ramiro Moyano
7. Diego Palma
8. Anibal Panceyra Garrido
9. Facundo Panceyra Garrido
10. Ignacio Pasman
11. Gastón Revol (c)
12. Javier Rojas

=== England ===
Coach: (England) Ben Ryan

1. Jeff Williams
2. Michael John Ellery
3. Rob Vickerman
4. Dan Norton
5. James Rodwell
6. Tom Mitchell (c)
7. John Brake
8. Tom Powell
9. Marcus Watson
10. Christian Lewis-Pratt
11. Mat Turner
12. Mark Odejobi

=== Hong Kong ===
Coach: (Wales) Dai Rees

1. Ka Chun Kwok
2. Eni Gesinde
3. Nick Hewson
4. Anthony Haynes
5. Lee Jones
6. Ben Rimene
7. Joshua Robert Peters
8. Alex McQueen
9. Rowan Varty (c)
10. Jamie Hood
11. Tom McQueen
12. Salom Yiu

=== Portugal ===
1. Adérito Esteves
2. Duarte Moreira
3. Gonçalo Foro
4. Pedro Leal (c)
5. Diogo Miranda
6. Frederico Oliveira
7. Francisco de Almeida
8. David Mateus
9. Pedro Ávila
10. José Vareta
11. Rafael Simões
12. Miguel Lucas
