= 2021–22 Tottenham Hotspur F.C. Women season =

2021–22 season of Tottenham Hotspur Women

Tottenham Hotspur
2021–22 season
- Chairman: June Clarke
- Head coach: Rehanne Skinner
- Stadium: The Hive
- FA WSL: 5th
- FA Cup: Fourth round
- FA League Cup: Semi-finals
- Top goalscorer: League: Rachel Williams (4); All: Angela Addison and Rachel Williams (6)
- Highest home attendance: 4,681 v Birmingham City; 4 September 2021
- Lowest home attendance: 508 v Aston Villa; 3 April 2022
- Average home league attendance: 1,866
- Biggest win: 11–0 v Watford (17 November 2021)
- Biggest defeat: 0–3 v Manchester United (23 January 2022); 0–3 v Manchester City (3 February 2022)
Home colours	Away colours	Third colours

The 2021–22 Tottenham Hotspur F.C. Women season was the club's 37th season in existence and their third in the FA Women's Super League, the highest level of the football pyramid. Along with competing in the WSL, the club also contested two domestic cup competitions, namely the FA Cup and the League Cup.

== Squad ==
As of 18 March 2022.

Note: Flags indicate national team as defined under FIFA eligibility rules; some limited exceptions apply. Players may hold more than one non-FIFA nationality.

No.	Pos.	Nation	Player
1	GK	FIN	Tinja-Riikka Korpela
3	DF	CAN	Shelina Zadorsky
4	MF	WAL	Josie Green (captain)
5	DF	ENG	Molly Bartrip
6	DF	ENG	Kerys Harrop
7	FW	ENG	Jessica Naz
8	MF	KOR	Cho So-hyun
9	FW	CHN	Tang Jiali (on loan from Shanghai Shengli)
10	FW	ENG	Rachel Williams
11	DF	AUT	Viktoria Schnaderbeck (on loan from Arsenal)
12	DF	NZL	Ria Percival

No.	Pos.	Nation	Player
13	DF	ENG	Asmita Ale
14	FW	ENG	Angela Addison
16	FW	ENG	Kit Graham
17	FW	AUS	Kyah Simon
18	FW	ENG	Chioma Ubogagu
21	MF	FRA	Maéva Clemaron
22	GK	JAM	Rebecca Spencer (vice-captain)
23	FW	MAR	Rosella Ayane
24	MF	FIN	Eveliina Summanen
29	DF	ENG	Ashleigh Neville
31	DF	WAL	Scarlett Williams
44	FW	ENG	Isabella Lane

== Preseason ==
8 August 2021 Friendly	Tottenham Hotspur	0–4	Arsenal	Tottenham
16:45		Report	Hennessy 34', 90+3'; McCabe 74' (pen.); Patten 89'	Stadium: Tottenham Hotspur Stadium; Referee: Lisa Benn

29 August 2021 Friendly	Leicester City	–	Tottenham Hotspur	Seagrave
		Report		Stadium: Belvoir Drive; Attendance: Behind-closed-doors
Note: No official scoreline released

== FA Women's Super League ==
=== Results summary ===
Overall								Home						Away					
Pld	W	D	L	GF	GA	GD	Pts	W	D	L	GF	GA	GD	W	D	L	GF	GA	GD
22	9	5	8	24	23	+1	32	5	3	3	12	8	+4	4	2	5	12	15	−3

Last updated: 8 May 2022.
Source: FA WSL

=== Results by matchday ===
Round	1	2	3	4	5	6	7	8	9	10	11	12	13	14	15	16	17	18	19	20	21	22
Ground	H	A	H	A	A	H	H	A	A	H	H	A	H	A	A	H	H	H	A	A	A	H
Result	W	W	W	W	L	D	D	L	W	W	D	L	W	W	D	L	L	L	L	D	L	W
Position	6	4	2	2	3	3	4	4	3	3	4	4	4	3	4	4	5	5	5	5	5	5

A = Away; H = Home; W = Win; D = Draw; L = Loss

=== Results ===
4 September 2021 1	Tottenham Hotspur	1–0	Birmingham City	Tottenham
15:00 BST	Graham 40'	Report	Robertson (yellow card) 46'; Sarri (yellow card) 90+2'	Stadium: Tottenham Hotspur Stadium; Attendance: 4,681; Referee: Lisa Benn

12 September 2021 2	Manchester City	1–2	Tottenham Hotspur	Manchester
18:45 BST	Hemp 6'; Morgan (yellow card) 11'	Report	Williams 61'; Benameur Taieb 86' (o.g.); Neville (yellow card) 90+6'	Stadium: Academy Stadium; Attendance: 1,126; Referee: Abigail Byrne

26 September 2021 3	Tottenham Hotspur	1–0	Reading	Edgware
14:00 BST	Ubogagu (yellow card) 38'; Ale (yellow card) 73'; Naz 85'	Report	Moloney (yellow card) 80'	Stadium: The Hive; Attendance: 621; Referee: Amy Fearn

3 October 2021 4	Leicester City	0–2	Tottenham Hotspur	Leicester
14:00 BST	Tierney (yellow card) 82'	Report	Williams 38'; Ale (yellow card) 59'; Addison 88'	Stadium: King Power Stadium; Attendance: 2,157; Referee: Abigail Byrne

10 October 2021 5	Brighton & Hove Albion	2–1	Tottenham Hotspur	Crawley
14:00 BST	Lee 37'; Connolly (yellow card) 70'; V. Williams 86'; Green (yellow card) 90+1'	Report	R. Williams (yellow card) 3' (yellow-red card) 76'; Graham 88'	Stadium: Broadfield Stadium; Attendance: 1,213; Referee: Kirsty Dowle

7 November 2021 6	Tottenham Hotspur	1–1	Manchester United	Edgware
12:15 GMT	Simon (yellow card) 68'; Percival (yellow card) 69', (goal) 90+5'	Report	Russo 45+2'; Blundell (yellow card) 77'	Stadium: The Hive; Attendance: 1,308; Referee: Emily Heaslip

13 November 2021 7	Tottenham Hotspur	1–1	Arsenal	Edgware
13:30 GMT	Clemaron (yellow card) 50'; Williams 65'; Neville (yellow card) 82'; Ayane (yellow card) 90+1'	Report	Mead (yellow card) 82'; Miedema 90+2'	Stadium: The Hive; Attendance: 2,896; Referee: Amy Fearn

21 November 2021 8	West Ham United	1–0	Tottenham Hotspur	Dagenham
15:00 GMT	Brynjarsdóttir 69'; Longhurst (yellow card) 88'	Report	Graham (yellow card) 16'; Simon (yellow card) 71'; Percival (yellow card) 76'; Ayane (yellow card) 81'	Stadium: Victoria Road; Attendance: 1,242; Referee: Lisa Benn

12 December 2021 9	Aston Villa	1–2	Tottenham Hotspur	Walsall
18:00 GMT	Allen 19', (yellow card) 77'; Littlejohn (yellow card) 45'	Report	Simon 29' (pen.); Williams (yellow card) 45', (goal) 68'; Clemaron (yellow card) 62'	Stadium: Bescot Stadium; Attendance: 385; Referee: Kirsty Dowle

19 December 2021 10	Tottenham Hotspur	1–0	Everton	Edgware
14:00 GMT	Naz (yellow card) 14', (goal) 51'; Neville (yellow card) 56'	Report	Galli (yellow card) 39'; Graham (yellow card) 43'	Stadium: The Hive; Attendance: 576; Referee: Elizabeth Simms

7 January 2022	Chelsea	P–P	Tottenham Hotspur	Kingston upon Thames
19:00 GMT				Stadium: Kingsmeadow
Note: Postponed due to a COVID-19 outbreak at Chelsea

16 January 2022 11	Tottenham Hotspur	1–1	West Ham United	Edgware
18:45 GMT	Clemaron (yellow card) 45+4'; Ayane 54' (pen.); Zadorsky (yellow card) 74'	Report	Stringer (yellow card) 18'; Cissoko (yellow card) 30' (yellow-red card) 56'; Snerle (yellow card) 57'; Longhurst 90+2'	Stadium: The Hive; Attendance: 678; Referee: Amy Fearn

23 January 2022 12	Manchester United	3–0	Tottenham Hotspur	Leigh
12:00 GMT	Toone (yellow card) 29'; Bøe Risa 38'; Ladd 42', (yellow card) 86'; Galton 62'	Report		Stadium: Leigh Sports Village; Attendance: 1,519; Referee: Lucy May

6 February 2022 13	Tottenham Hotspur	4–0	Brighton & Hove Albion	Edgware
14:00 GMT	Simon 12', 63'; Neville 57'; Summanen (yellow card) 58'; Zadorsky 62'	Report	V. Williams (yellow card) 23'	Stadium: The Hive; Attendance: 557; Referee: Lauren Impey

13 February 2022 14	Birmingham City	0–2	Tottenham Hotspur	Birmingham
14:00 GMT	Robertson (yellow card) 33'; Ramsey (yellow card) 86'	Report	Neville 66'; Percival 85'	Stadium: St Andrew's; Attendance: 487; Referee: Emily Heaslip

6 March 2022 15	Reading	0–0	Tottenham Hotspur	Reading
14:00 GMT		Report	Percival (yellow card) 18'; Bartrip (yellow card) 75'; Summanen (yellow card) 79'; Clemaron (yellow card) 86'	Stadium: Madejski Stadium; Attendance: 960; Referee: Lauren Impey

13 March 2022 16	Tottenham Hotspur	0–1	Manchester City	Edgware
12:30 GMT	Neville (yellow card) 70'; Harrop (yellow card) 90+2'	Report	Greenwood (yellow card) 5'; Weir 64'; Roebuck (yellow card) 81'	Stadium: The Hive; Attendance: 1,303; Referee: Emily Heaslip

23 March 2022	Chelsea	P–P	Tottenham Hotspur	Kingston upon Thames
19:45 GMT				Stadium: Kingsmeadow
Note: Rescheduled from 7 January 2022. Postponed due to a COVID-19 outbreak at Tottenham.

26 March 2022	Arsenal	P–P	Tottenham Hotspur	Holloway
14:15 GMT				Stadium: Emirates Stadium
Note: Postponed due to a COVID-19 outbreak at Tottenham.

3 April 2022 17	Tottenham Hotspur	0–1	Aston Villa	Edgware
14:00 BST	Clemaron (yellow card) 87'	Report	Petzelberger 87'; Pacheco (yellow card) 90+3'	Stadium: The Hive; Attendance: 508; Referee: Farai Hallam

24 April 2022 18	Tottenham Hotspur	1–3	Chelsea	Edgware
14:30 BST	Ingle 15' (o.g.); Zadorsky (yellow card) 73'; Williams (yellow card) 75'	Report	Reiten 27'; Berger (red card) 33'; Bright (yellow card) 45+4'; Kerr 71'; Carter (yellow card) 90+3'; Fleming 90+5'	Stadium: The Hive; Attendance: 2,161; Referee: Lisa Benn

28 April 2022 19	Chelsea	2–1	Tottenham Hotspur	Kingston upon Thames
19:45 BST	England 19'; Kerr 45+1'	Report	Harrop 44'; Ayane (yellow card) 87'; Bartrip (yellow card) 88'	Stadium: Kingsmeadow; Attendance: 3,660; Referee: Jack Packman
Note: Rescheduled twice from 7 January 2022 and then 23 March 2022.

1 May 2022 20	Everton	2–2	Tottenham Hotspur	Liverpool
19:30 BST	Turner 85'; Finnigan 90+1'	Report	Ale 5'; Clemaron (yellow card) 45+3'; Green 85'	Stadium: Walton Hall Park; Attendance: 462; Referee: Lauren Impey

4 May 2022 21	Arsenal	3–0	Tottenham Hotspur	Holloway
19:15 BST	Mead 4'; Foord 71', 82'; McCabe (yellow card) 73'	Report	Simon (yellow card) 24'; Summanen (yellow card) 57'; Green (yellow card) 73'; Clemaron (yellow card) 74'	Stadium: Emirates Stadium; Attendance: 12,800; Referee: Louise Saunders
Note: Rescheduled from 26 March 2022.

8 May 2022 22	Tottenham Hotspur	1–0	Leicester City	Tottenham
12:00 BST	Neville 49'; Williams (yellow card) 80'; Ale (yellow card) 84'	Report	Goodwin (yellow card) 58'; Tierney (yellow card) 86'	Stadium: Tottenham Hotspur Stadium; Attendance: 3,994; Referee: Kirsty Dowle

=== League table ===
Pos	Team	Pld	W	D	L	GF	GA	GD	Pts	Qualification or relegation
3	Manchester City	22	15	2	5	60	22	+38	47	Qualification for the Champions League first round
4	Manchester United	22	12	6	4	45	22	+23	42	
5	Tottenham Hotspur	22	9	5	8	24	23	+1	32	
6	West Ham United	22	7	6	9	23	33	−10	27	
7	Brighton & Hove Albion	22	8	2	12	24	38	−14	26	

Source: FA WSL
Rules for classification: 1) Points; 2) Goal difference; 3) Number of goals scored.

== Women's FA Cup ==
As a member of the first tier, Tottenham Hotspur entered the FA Cup in the fourth round proper.

30 January 2022 Fourth round	Tottenham Hotspur	1–3 (a.e.t.)	Leicester City	Edgware
14:00 GMT	Addison 61'	Report	O'Brien (yellow card) 39', (goal) 82'; Barker (yellow card) 49'; Broughton (yellow card) 64'; Howard 91'; McManus (yellow card) 120'; de Graaf 120+2'	Stadium: The Hive; Attendance: 596; Referee: Robert Whitton

== FA Women's League Cup ==
=== Group stage ===
13 October 2021 Group stage	Tottenham Hotspur	1–0	Charlton Athletic	Edgware
19:30 BST	Tang 51'	Report	Newborough (yellow card) 31'; Wynne (yellow card) 37'; Filbey (yellow card) 53'	Stadium: The Hive; Referee: Amy Fearn

17 November 2021 Group stage	Watford	0–11	Tottenham Hotspur	Kings Langley
19:30 GMT		Report	Ale 38'; Morgan 42'; Addison 45', 45+2', 78'; Ayane 47', 60', 71'; Ubogagu 54'; Cho 85'; Lane 89'	Stadium: Gaywood Park; Referee: Jade Wardle

15 December 2021 Group stage	Coventry United	2–3	Tottenham Hotspur	Coventry
19:45 GMT	Georgiou (yellow card) 31'; Toussaint 49'; Hardy 77'	Report	Morgan 10'; Addison 30'; Williams 89'	Stadium: Butts Park Arena

Pos	Team	Pld	W	WPEN	LPEN	L	GF	GA	GD	Pts	Qualification	TOT	CHA	COV	WAT
1	Tottenham Hotspur	3	3	0	0	0	15	2	+13	9	Advances to knock-out stage	—	1–0	—	—
2	Charlton Athletic	3	2	0	0	1	8	2	+6	6	Possible knock-out stage based on ranking	—	—	3–1	—
3	Coventry United	3	1	0	0	2	6	6	0	3		2–3	—	—	3–0
4	Watford	3	0	0	0	3	0	19	−19	0		0–11	0–5	—	—

Source: thefa.com
Rules for classification: 1) Points; 2) Goal difference; 3) Number of goals scored; 4) Number of wins; 5) Head-to-head record

=== Knockout stage ===
19 January 2022 Quarter-final	Tottenham Hotspur	1–0	Liverpool	Edgware
19:30 GMT	Green (yellow card) 19'; Ale (yellow card) 62'; R. Williams 71'	Report	Moore (yellow card) 8'	Stadium: The Hive; Referee: Robert Massey-Ellis

3 February 2022 Semi-final	Manchester City	3–0	Tottenham Hotspur	Manchester
19:00 GMT	Park 21'; Shaw 27', (yellow card) 45+2'; Hemp 70'	Report	Clemaron (yellow card) 13'	Stadium: Academy Stadium; Attendance: 1,410; Referee: Simon Mather

== Squad statistics ==
=== Appearances ===
As of 8 May 2022

Starting appearances are listed first, followed by substitute appearances after the + symbol where applicable. Players listed with no appearances have been in the matchday squad but only as unused substitutes.

No.	Pos	Nat	Player	Total		FA WSL		FA Cup		League Cup	
No.	Pos	Nat	Player	Apps	Goals	Apps	Goals	Apps	Goals	Apps	Goals
1	GK	(Finland) FIN	Tinja-Riikka Korpela	14	0	11	0	0	0	3	0
3	DF	(Canada) CAN	Shelina Zadorsky	26	1	21	1	1	0	4	0
4	MF	(Wales) WAL	Josie Green	15	1	6+5	1	0	0	4	0
5	DF	(England) ENG	Molly Bartrip	27	0	22	0	1	0	4	0
6	DF	(England) ENG	Kerys Harrop	25	1	17+2	1	0+1	0	4+1	0
7	FW	(England) ENG	Jessica Naz	21	2	14+2	2	1	0	3+1	0
8	MF	(South Korea) KOR	Cho So-hyun	14	1	7+5	0	0	0	2	1
9	FW	(China) CHN	Tang Jiali	12	1	2+8	0	0	0	2	1
10	MF	(England) ENG	Rachel Williams	26	6	21+1	4	1	0	2+1	2
11	DF	(Austria) AUT	Viktoria Schnaderbeck	5	0	3+1	0	0+1	0	0	0
12	DF	(New Zealand) NZL	Ria Percival	20	2	17	2	1	0	1+1	0
13	DF	(England) ENG	Asmita Ale	19	2	10+3	1	1	0	4+1	1
14	FW	(England) ENG	Angela Addison	25	6	1+18	1	1	1	4+1	4
16	FW	(England) ENG	Kit Graham	10	2	7+1	2	0	0	2	0
17	FW	(Australia) AUS	Kyah Simon	15	3	13+1	3	0	0	1	0
18	FW	(England) ENG	Chioma Ubogagu	12	1	4+6	0	0	0	1+1	1
21	MF	(France) FRA	Maéva Clemaron	25	0	21	0	1	0	2+1	0
22	GK	(Jamaica) JAM	Rebecca Spencer	14	0	11	0	1	0	2	0
23	FW	(Morocco) MAR	Rosella Ayane	22	4	7+10	1	1	0	4	3
24	MF	(Finland) FIN	Eveliina Summanen	12	0	7+3	0	0+1	0	0+1	0
29	DF	(England) ENG	Ashleigh Neville	25	3	20+1	3	1	0	1+2	0
31	DF	(Wales) WAL	Scarlett Williams	1	0	0	0	0	0	0+1	0
44	FW	(England) ENG	Isabella Lane	5	1	0+2	0	0	0	1+2	1
Players away from the club on loan:
2	DF	(Wales) WAL	Esther Morgan	4	2	0	0	0	0	4	2

=== Goalscorers ===
The list is sorted by shirt number when total goals are equal.

Rnk	Pos	No.	Player	FA WSL	FA Cup	League Cup	Total
1	MF	10	(England) Rachel Williams	4	0	2	6
1	FW	14	(England) Angela Addison	1	1	4	6
3	FW	23	(Morocco) Rosella Ayane	1	0	3	4
4	FW	17	(Australia) Kyah Simon	3	0	0	3
4	DF	29	(England) Ashleigh Neville	3	0	0	3
6	DF	2	(Wales) Esther Morgan	0	0	2	2
6	FW	7	(England) Jessica Naz	2	0	0	2
6	DF	12	(New Zealand) Ria Percival	2	0	0	2
6	DF	13	(England) Asmita Ale	1	0	1	2
6	FW	16	(England) Kit Graham	2	0	0	2
11	DF	3	(Canada) Shelina Zadorsky	1	0	0	1
11	MF	4	(Wales) Josie Green	1	0	0	1
11	DF	6	(England) Kerys Harrop	1	0	0	1
11	MF	8	(South Korea) Cho So-hyun	0	0	1	1
11	FW	9	(China) Tang Jiali	0	0	1	1
11	FW	18	(England) Chioma Ubogagu	0	0	1	1
11	FW	44	(England) Isabella Lane	0	0	1	1
TOTALS				22	1	16	39

Last updated: 8 May 2022.
Source: bbc.co.uk

=== Clean sheets ===
The list is sorted by shirt number when total clean sheets are equal.

Rnk	No.	Player	FA WSL	FA Cup	League Cup	Total
1	1	(Finland) Tinja-Riikka Korpela	3	0	3	6
1	22	(Jamaica) Rebecca Spencer	5	0	1	6
TOTALS			8	0	4	12

Last updated: 8 May 2022.
Source: FBRef.com

== Transfers ==
=== Transfers in ===
Date	Position	Nationality	Name	From	Ref.
2 July 2021	MF	(South Korea)	Cho So-hyun	(England) West Ham United	
6 July 2021	MF	(France)	Maéva Clemaron	(England) Everton	
6 July 2021	GK	(Finland)	Tinja-Riikka Korpela	(England) Everton	
10 July 2021	MF	(Mexico)	Silvana Flores	(England) Reading	
16 July 2021	DF	(England)	Molly Bartrip	(England) Reading	
22 July 2021	DF	(England)	Gracie Pearse	(England) Crystal Palace	
30 July 2021	FW	(England)	Chioma Ubogagu	(Spain) Real Madrid	
6 August 2021	DF	(England)	Asmita Ale	(England) Aston Villa	
7 August 2021	FW	(Australia)	Kyah Simon	(Netherlands) PSV Eindhoven	
13 August 2021	GK	(England)	Eleanor Heeps	(England) Liverpool	
10 January 2022	MF	(Finland)	Eveliina Summanen	(Sweden) Kristianstad	

=== Loans in ===
Date	Position	Nationality	Name	From	Until	Ref.
21 July 2021	FW	(China)	Tang Jiali	(China) Shanghai Shengli	End of season	
27 January 2022	DF	(Austria)	Viktoria Schnaderbeck	(England) Arsenal	End of season	

=== Transfers out ===
Date	Position	Nationality	Name	To	Ref.
25 May 2021	FW	(England)	Rianna Dean	(England) Liverpool	
25 May 2021	DF	(Australia)	Alanna Kennedy	(England) Manchester City	
25 May 2021	FW	(England)	Gemma Davison	(England) Aston Villa	
25 May 2021	MF	(Wales)	Anna Filbey	(England) Charlton Athletic	
25 May 2021	DF	(Scotland)	Hannah Godfrey	(England) Charlton Athletic	
25 May 2021	DF	(Dominican Republic)	Lucía León	(Spain) Real Betis	
25 May 2021	GK	(Norway)	Aurora Mikalsen	(Norway) Sandviken	
25 May 2021	MF	(England)	Chloe Peplow	(England) Reading	
25 May 2021	FW	(England)	Lucy Quinn	(England) Birmingham City	
25 May 2021	DF	(Netherlands)	Siri Worm	(Germany) Eintracht Frankfurt	
25 May 2021	MF	(England)	Elisha Sulola	(England) Charlton Athletic	
7 August 2021	GK	(England)	Amy Martin	(England) MK Dons	

=== Loans Out ===
Date	Position	Nationality	Name	To	Until	Ref.
22 July 2021	DF	(England)	Gracie Pearse	(England) Crystal Palace	End of season	
13 August 2021	GK	(England)	Eleanor Heeps	(England) Blackburn Rovers	End of season	
1 February 2022	DF	(Wales)	Esther Morgan	(England) Leicester City	End of season	
18 March 2022	FW	(Mexico)	Silvana Flores (Note: Dual registration)	(England) Ipswich Town	End of season	
