= Tottenham Hotspur F.C. Women's Academy =

- Full name: Tottenham Hotspur Football Club Women's Academy
- Nickname: Lilywhites
- Founded: 2020; 6 years ago
- Ground: Coles Park, Haringey Borough F.C.
- Capacity: 2500
- Academy director: Simon Davies
- Technical coaching manager: Nick Hardy
Home colours	Away colours	Third colours

Tottenham Hotspur Football Club Women's Academy is the youth academy of Tottenham Hotspur Women. The academy operates for girls from school years 8 to 13 (ages 12 to 18) and starting from the 2025–26 season the most senior team is the Under-19s. This plays in the Professional Game Academy (PGA) League as well as in the FA Women's National League Cup and the FA Women's National League Plate competitions.

The academy teams currently play at the Tottenham Hotspur training ground at Hotspur Way, Enfield, North London and at Coles Park, the home of semi-professional club Haringey Borough in White Hart Lane, London N17. Tottenham Hotspur Women's Academy was granted planning permission in 2025 for the construction of its own ground in Whitewebbs Park in Enfield.

== History ==
=== Tottenham Hotspur Women ===
Tottenham Hotspur F.C. Women was originally founded in 1985 as Broxbourne Ladies, and the club’s name changed to Tottenham Hotspur Ladies F.C. from the 1991–92 season. The reserve team started in 1992–93.

The top tier of women’s football is the Women's Super League (WSL). Founded in 2010, it began in the 2011 season as a summer league only, and therefore in only one calendar year, and replaced the FA Women’s Premier League National Division. The FA announced in July 2016 that the league would move from a summer league format to a winter league, in line with the traditional football calendar in England, with matches played from September to May the following year.

Tottenham Hotspur announced on 26 April 2019 that Tottenham Hotspur Ladies would be renamed to Tottenham Hotspur Women from the 2019–2020 season, which coincided with Tottenham Hotspur Ladies winning promotion to the WSL for that season.

=== Women's Academy ===
The Football Association launched the FA WSL Academy programme in 2018 in conjunction with eleven clubs (which did not include Tottenham Hotspur) to introduce a dual-careers programme to balance a female player's football development with educational, vocational and work-based requirements. The senior academy teams were Under-21s, which played in the WSL Academy fixtures North and South and acted as a pathway to the first team for talented players.

In 2020, the FA initiated a four-year strategic plan called ‘Inspiring Positive Change’. This had eight objectives to be achieved by 2024 including, for girls' football:

- Early Participation – at primary school level,
- Development Participation – every girl to have equal access to participation for fun, competition and excellence, and
- Club player pathway – develop with clubs an inclusive and effective high-performance player-centred pathway.

The strategy would see football embedded in schools as part of the Physical Education curriculum for girls, with schools becoming part of the FA Girls' Football School Partnerships network.

The Tottenham Hotspur Women's Academy was launched at the start of the 2020–21 season, as part of the club's formalised Female Talent Pathway enabling it to work with local grassroots clubs to identify talented female players and help them reach the highest level possible. It was established to provide a structured development route for girls aged 8 to 19, with a WSL Dual Career Academy for ages 16 to 21. The aim was to provide players from Tottenham and surrounding areas with an extensive programme which would support them in both their sporting and academic aspirations. In addition, players gained opportunities with the first team and could connect with other clubs across tiers 1 to 5 of the women's pathway.

Girls could begin at the Foundations and Grassroots stage or join one of the girls-only Player Development Programmes for ages 8 to 14 where they would gain by the help of the club's Global Football Development Coaches. The Women's Academy programme for girls in school years 4 to 10 (i.e. aged 8 to 15) would provide a full player development curriculum, incorporating technical and tactical coaching, games, medical access, sports science, strength and conditioning, analysis and lifestyle support whilst maintaining a dual-career approach and philosophy. There are also Tottenham Hotspur Women's Academy programmes for girls in school years 8 to 13 (i.e. aged 12 to 18). The senior academy pathway is the Under-19 Football Development College Programmes for girls aged 16 and above, organised in conjunction with Barnet and Southgate College and New City College, and aims to graduate players into the full-time Academy environment when appropriate. The club has multiple football development partners, both local and overseas, and among these works with girls at Culford School, a private and independent day and boarding school in Bury St Edmunds, and Hertford Regional College in Broxbourne.

On 9 April 2021, Esther Morgan became the first Tottenham Hotspur Women's Academy graduate to make her international debut, when she represented Wales in a 0–3 friendly loss against Canada.

Girls' Emerging Talent Centres were launched in 2022 and were designed to provide local, accessible and high-quality training environments. Ahead of the 2022–23 season, Tottenham Hotspur obtained an FA Emerging Talent Centre Licence so it could provide for talented female players from north London and the surrounding areas. The centre is pre-academy and works with selected players aged 8 to 13 and their schools to help develop future academy players. Those on the Player Development Programmes are encouraged to play locally for grassroots teams but also have the opportunity to represent Tottenham Hotspur Women’s Academy at appropriate age levels during school holidays.

In 2023, the FA replaced the WSL Academies, introducing Professional Game Academies (PGA's) for girls under-15 to under-21. PGA's allow players to be part of a professional club programme that combines football development with their education. Key programme features include playing against boys and girls teams; trips, tours and tournaments during school holidays; opportunities to gain coaching qualifications; Under-16s and Under-21s to compete in the FA Youth Cup and Under-21s to compete in the PGA League, while Under-16s would compete in their own cup and plate competitions. Ahead of the 2023–24 season, Tottenham Hotspur Women were one of 16 football clubs awarded a Category 1 Professional Game Academy License, while four others were awarded Category 2 Licenses.

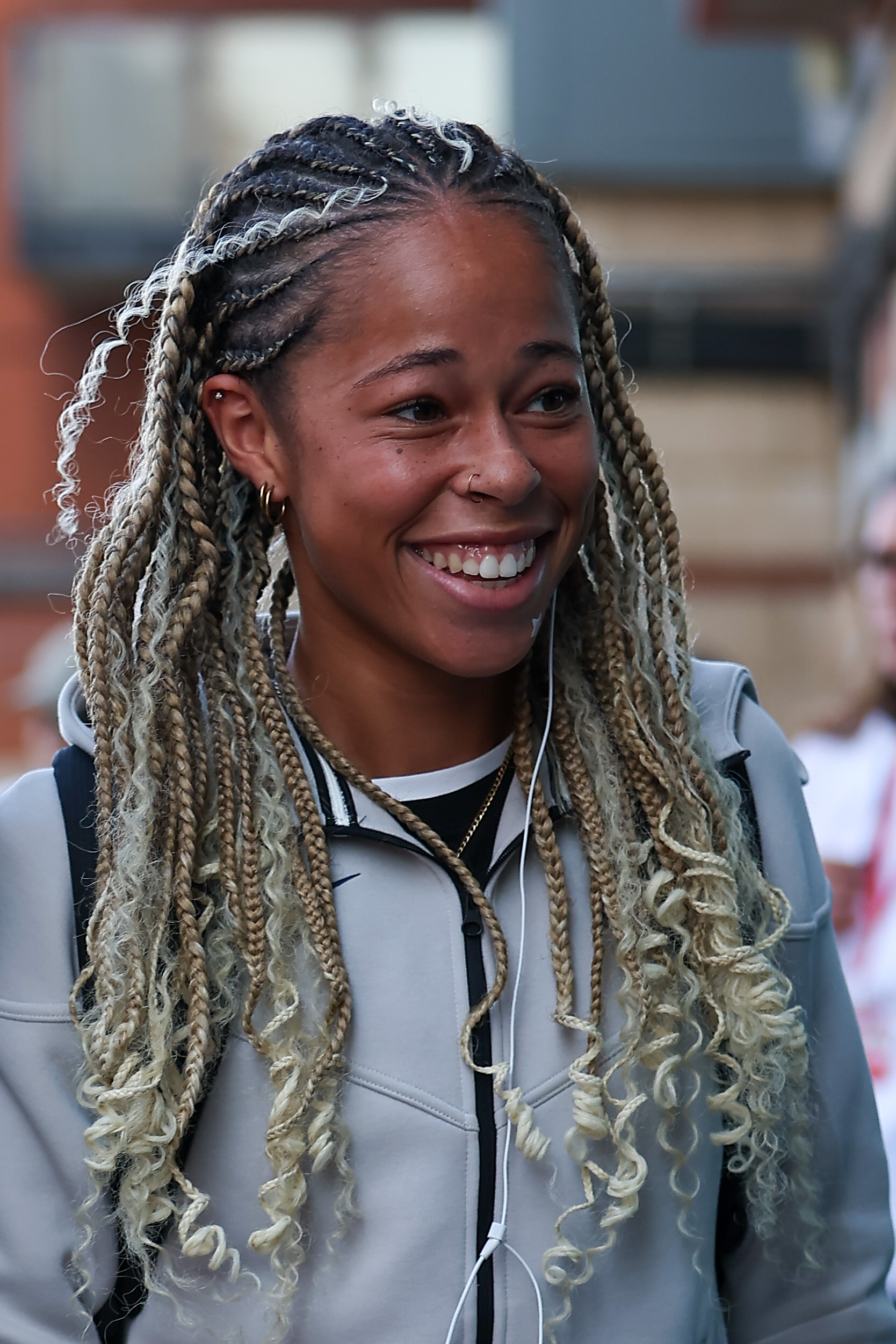
Gunning-Williams in 2025

In July 2023, English forward Lenna Gunning-Williams became the first Tottenham Hotspur Women's Academy graduate to sign a professional contract, although other players had come through the youth system to become professionals prior to the existence of the newer Women's Academy.

PGA teams were added to the FA Women's National League Plate from season 2024–25. The Plate had originally been launched in 2014 following reorganisations of the women's game and the resultant expansion of the number of divisions. It had now been decided to add academy teams, in a similar way to male academy teams taking part in the EFL Trophy.

In October 2024, the FA released its 2024–2028 strategic plan for women's and girls' football. This aimed to build upon the transformational progress achieved within women's and girls' football up to that time. There were four priorities:

- Build and protect the uniqueness of the women's game,
- Win a major tournament,
- Build robust, high-quality competition, and
- Deliver equal opportunities for women and girls to play.

Mark Bullingham, CEO at the FA, indicated the desire to have as many women and girls playing football as men and boys, as well as building the quality of the competitions and developing appropriate facilities.

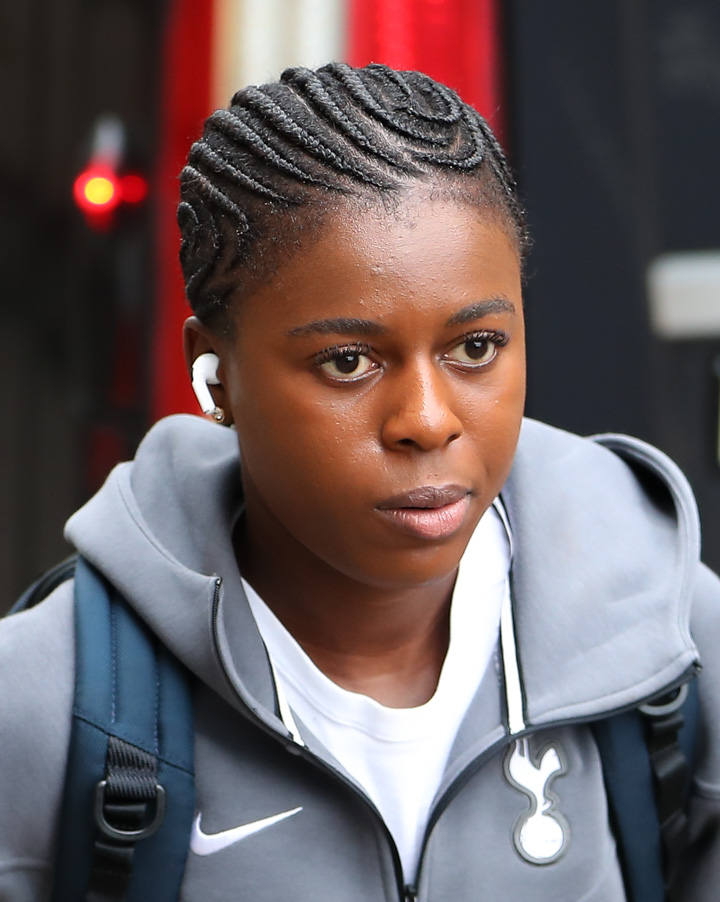
Naz in 2024

On 12 July 2024, Jessica Naz became the first Tottenham Hotspur youth system graduate to represent the full England Women's team, when she played in a 2–1 UEFA Women's Euro qualifying round victory over Republic of Ireland.

On 12 April 2025, the Under-16 team was victorious in the Professional Game Academy Champions Trophy final, with a 6-2 win over Blackburn Rovers Under-16s. This represented the first trophy won by the Academy since its formation in 2020.

Ahead of the 2025–26 season, it was announced that PGA teams would be competing in the FA Women's National League Cup for the first time. Along with this, there was the introduction of a group stage for the Cup.

Also ahead of the 2025–26 campaign, Tottenham Hotspur reclassified its Women's Under-21s as Under-19s, and a new coaching structure was put in place with Academy technical coaching manager Nick Hardy taking overall charge across the entire women's academy. Despite this reclassification, the team continued to play against other clubs' Under-21 sides in the PGA Under-21's League (U21 League South), the Under-21's Cup, Under-21's Plate and the Capital Women's Senior Cup, with an additional team in the Under-16's Cup and Under-16's Plate. The academy also has an Under-14 level.

In January 2026, the WSL announced it would be introducing academy contracts for young players at WSL and WSL2 clubs with effect from the 2026–27 season. Clubs will be able to offer 16-year-old players up to a two-year full-time contract, which WSL rules had until now prohibited for that age. The new arrangement is not mandatory and clubs can continue to offer scholarships if they choose. It is hoped the new contracts will stop the top WSL teams taking the best academy talent from clubs lower down the pyramid without the smaller clubs being adequately compensated. They will also allow young players to stay in schools more easily, allowing them full-time education and the ability to take exams alongside their football development.

In March 2026, Tottenham Hotspur announced a three-year partnership with Pymble Ladies' College, a girls' school based in Sydney, Australia. Tegan Burling, formerly the Barnet Southgate women’s head coach and now Tottenham Hotspur's lead international development coach, would deliver coaching clinics to students, looking to support, alongside the college, the development of girls' football in the region. This is the latest in the club's international development partnerships, under the control of head of global football development Danny Mitchell, which can be found in Australia, New Zealand, the Asia-Pacific region, and Spain.

In September 2026, the Under-19s finished fifth in the PGA League Southern Division to qualify for the League's Division One for the first time.

== Grounds ==
The Tottenham Hotspur Women's academy teams currently play at the Tottenham Hotspur training ground at Hotspur Way, Enfield, and at Coles Park, the 2500 capacity home of semi-professional Spartan South Midlands Football League club Haringey Borough F.C., in White Hart Lane, London N17. When the Under-19 team reached the senior Capital Cup quarter-final in 2026, the fixture on 2 April was a debut performance in front of fans at the ground of Cheshunt F.C.. Tottenham Hotspur Women's Academy looked set to have a dedicated state-of-the-art facility built at Whitewebbs Park in Enfield, North London, following planning approval by City Hall in 2025. The proposal allowed for development adjacent to the existing men's training facility in Hotspur Way and the new site would feature 11 pitches and a clubhouse. In the face of on-going local opposition to the plan as it involves development of Green Belt land, on 27 July 2026, the High Court quashed the planning permission at a judicial review after Enfield Council withdrew its defence following a change in its political make-up. Tottenham Hotspur noted the decision related to the legal process followed by the council in making its original decision to grant planning permission, not the merits of the proposal itself.

== Kit ==
The kit provider for the women’s academy’s teams has been Nike, one of the world's leading brands, since the academy’s creation. AIA Group Limited, one of the world's leading providers of insurance services, has been the main shirt sponsor from the outset. while Kraken, one of the world's largest cryptocurrency exchanges, became the sleeve sponsor in 2024. In September 2025, premium global outdoor brand Yeti became Tottenham Hotspur women’s front of training kit partner as well as the new luggage partner.

== Development partnerships ==
=== AIA ===
Tottenham Hotspur has worked with AIA Group Limited in locations such as Hong Kong, Singapore, Sri Lanka, Thailand and others across the Asia-Pacific region. The partnership provides football development opportunities for young people and promotes healthy living through the sport, together with exercise and good nutrition.

This is the longest-lived of all of the club's international partnerships. AIA first linked with Tottenham Hotspur when it became the shirt sponsor for cup matches in the 2013–14 season. It took over as the main shirt sponsor from season 2014–15, when it also became the club's new principal global partner. The aim was to promote the role of sport as a key element of healthy living, with Spurs' global coaching team delivering programs at an elite level to support AIA's key objectives.

The partnership has been renewed repeatedly over the years, and the most recent renewal was in November 2025 with AIA set to become Tottenham Hotspur's global training partner with effect from July 2027 and lasting until June 2032, replacing the shirt-sponsorship and global principal partner arrangements from the end of the 2026–27 season.

=== Barnet and Southgate College ===
Tottenham Hotspur Women runs a football academy in partnership with Barnet and Southgate College for girls aged 16 to 19. It is the longest-running of all Tottenham Hotspur’s UK partnerships, having been in place since the 2008–09 season.

The Barnet and Southgate College Tottenham Hotspur Women's football programme is described by the college as one of the most successful college football programmes in the country for player development, with a number of graduates having progressed to the Tottenham Hotspur Women first team. The college and the club run the programme at the Southgate campus for both young men and women.

The programme is designed to provide players who have played at a regional league level or lower with a full-time education in a variety of qualifications with a football and strength and conditioning program led by Tottenham Hotspur staff. This programme sits directly under the PGA in the club’s Talent Pathway and progression between programmes can happen naturally throughout the academic year. Among its aims and objectives are to provide outstanding football coaching and related opportunities to young female players alongside a high quality, full-time academic education and allow dedicated players to learn and develop through a structured programme of training, physical development and competitive games.

The course links Academy-standard football coaching, provided by the Tottenham Hotspur Global Football Development team, with a range of full-time academic qualifications as part of the study programme offered by Barnet and Southgate College. It also provides an opportunity to be part of the Tottenham Hotspur Coaching Excellence Centre programme.

Football training takes place at Coles Park Stadium, the home of semi-professional Spartan South Midlands Football League club Haringey Borough F.C. Students will also have occasional access to sessions at Tottenham Hotspur's state-of-the-art training centre over the duration of the year.

=== New City College ===
New City College entered into a partnership with Tottenham Hotspur Football Club to give its sports students the opportunity to develop a career in the sports sector. Through this partnership, both male and female students can gain experience in professional coaching, alongside dedicated support to enhance their sports performance.

This programme is available for any full-time 16 to 18-year-old Sport and Fitness course, or for adults as a Higher Education HNC or HND course in Sport and Exercise Science. Training is given by coaches from Tottenham Hotspur, and all teaching delivered by staff from New City.

The college is dedicated to creating pathways which are inclusive and accessible for young women with talent and potential, and the partnership with the club gives female students experience in professional training and coaching. It is designed for students who want a career in the sports industry, even giving students the potential opportunity to work or play at professional level.

The aim of the programme is not only to develop exceptional players and sports professionals but also to create the next generation of coaches, strength and conditioning staff, physiotherapists, nutritionists, analysts or in other sports-related fields.

=== Hoddesdon Town FC ===
Tottenham Hotspur Women’s Academy runs a programme with Hoddesdon Town Football Club of the Eastern Counties Football League for the training of students in years 8 to 13. The aim of the Women’s Academy Programme is to provide support to players from Tottenham and surrounding areas, enabling them to gain opportunities with the women’s first-team or with other clubs across tiers 1 to 5 of the women's pathway.

Hoddesdon Town shares the traditional Tottenham Hotspur nickname of ‘The Lilywhites’ and, including as recently as season 2024–25, Tottenham Hotspur Women’s Under-21s home matches have at times been played at Hoddesdon Town's stadium, known as Lowfield, which has a 3000 capacity.

== Players ==
=== Under-19s ===
As of 4 September 2026

Note: Flags indicate national team as defined under FIFA eligibility rules; some limited exceptions apply. Players may hold more than one non-FIFA nationality.

No.	Pos.	Nation	Player
50	DF	WAL	Heidi Hills
56	GK	ENG	Sophie Jackson
—	GK	ENG	Rose Mylam
—	GK	ENG	Erin Radbourne
—	GK	ENG	Cassie Shields
—	DF	ENG	Dasha Mensah Abeka
—	DF	ENG	Lucy Barraclough
—	DF	ENG	Daisy May Bird
—	DF	ENG	Amie Bush
—	DF	ENG	Holly-Mae Elmes
—	DF	ENG	Evie Northwood

No.	Pos.	Nation	Player
—	MF	ENG	Nife Aramide
—	MF	ENG	Waris Deria
—	MF	ENG	Ellie Johnson
—	MF	SCO	Mehak Khanna
—	MF	ENG	Ruby Mace
—	MF	ENG	Rania Oukriss
—	MF	ENG	Lexi Withey
—	FW	ENG	Grace Bellwood
—	FW	ENG	Poppy Neill
—	FW	ROU	Daria Ordean
—	FW	SCO	Eloise Summers-Mee

=== Dual registration loan ===
Dual registration loans allow young players to gain experience at lower league clubs, usually Women's National League, while remaining eligible for their parent club's academy or even senior team games. The following are dual registered:

Note: Flags indicate national team as defined under FIFA eligibility rules; some limited exceptions apply. Players may hold more than one non-FIFA nationality.

No.	Pos.	Nation	Player
—	GK	ENG	Rose Mylam (at Ashford Town Women)
—	GK	ENG	Erin Radbourne (at Milton Keynes Dons Women until end of 2026–27 season)

No.	Pos.	Nation	Player
—	MF	ENG	Rania Oukriss (at Portsmouth Women until 31 December 2026)

=== Academy development registration ===
Academy development registration (ADR) loans were introduced during the 2025–26 football season, replacing the older dual registration loan scheme. They are intended for development, and act as a bridge between academy and first-team football. No Tottenham Hotspur Women's Academy players are currently on ADR loan.

Note: Flags indicate national team as defined under FIFA eligibility rules; some limited exceptions apply. Players may hold more than one non-FIFA nationality.

No.	Pos.	Nation	Player

== Management and staff ==
=== Current staff ===
As of 1 September 2026

Position	Name
Academy director	Simon Davies
Technical coaching manager	Nick Hardy
Under-19s head coach	Matt Sharman
Under-16s head coach	Angus Hall
Under-19s and Under-16s assistant coach	Stella Calderhead
Head of goalkeeping	Brad Morgan
Education and Football Development Centre manager	Paul Griffiths
Operations manager	Jenna Schillaci
Director of football operations	(United States) Rafi Moersen
Director of women's football	(Norway) Kim Pedersen*
Performance director	Dan Lewindon
Women's director of performance and operations	Hannah Sheridan
Women's growth director	Lucy Button

*With effect from 7 December 2026

== Academy graduates ==
This is a list of former Tottenham Hotspur F.C. Women's Academy or youth team players who have gone on to represent their country at full international level. Players currently registered with the club are in bold; other still active players are in italics.

As of 25 March 2026

- (Dominican Republic) Lucía León
- (England) **Jessica Naz**
- (Wales) Esther Morgan

== Honours ==
=== Reserves/Under-21s ===
- **Capital Women's Intermediate Cup**
  - Winners (1): 2016–17
- **FA Women's Premier League Reserve Cup**
  - Winners (1): 2016–17
- **FA Women's National League Reserve Southern Division**
  - Winners (1): 2016–17
- **Greater London Regional Women's League – Reserve Division 1**
  - Winners (1): 2006–07
- **London County Junior Cup**
  - Winners (1): 2012–13
- **Sue Sharples Memorial Trophy**
  - Winners (2): 1994–95, 2006–07

=== Youths ===
- **Greater London Regional Women's League – Reserve Division 3 (West)**
  - Winners (1): 1997–98
- **Greater London Regional Women's League – Reserve Division 2**
  - Winners (1): 2003–04
- **Under-16s Professional Game Academy League Trophy**
  - Winners (1): 2024–25
- **Under-16s Professional Game Academy League Plate**
  - Winners (1): 2025–26

== See also ==
- Tottenham Hotspur F.C.
- Tottenham Hotspur F.C. Women
