= Rugby sevens at the 2013 Summer Universiade =

Rugby sevens competition held in Russia

Rugby sevens at the XXVII Summer Universiade
- Venues: Tulpar Stadium; Dinamo Stadium (training)
- Dates: 14–17 July
- Teams: 16 (men); 10 (women)

Rugby sevens was contested at the 2013 Summer Universiade from July 14 to 17 at the Dinamo Stadium and the Tulpar Stadium in Kazan, Russia. Rugby sevens makes its debut at the 2013 Summer Universiade after it was voted to become an Olympic sport for the 2016 Summer Olympics in Rio de Janeiro.

== Medal summary ==
=== Medal table ===
Rank	Nation	Gold	Silver	Bronze	Total
1	Russia (RUS)*	2	0	0	2
2	France (FRA)	0	1	0	1
2	Italy (ITA)	0	1	0	1
4	Canada (CAN)	0	0	1	1
4	Great Britain (GBR)	0	0	1	1
Totals (5 entries)		2	2	2	6

=== Medal events ===
Event	Gold	Silver	Bronze
Men	Russia (RUS); Ilya Babaev; Stanislav Bondarev; German Davydov; Eduard Filatov; Igor Galinovskiy; Ramil Gaysin; Yuriy Gostyuzhev; Viktor Gresev; Vladislav Lazarenko; Vladimir Ostroushko; Denis Simplikevich; Sergey Yanushkin	France (FRA); Florent Benech; Remy Bouet; Lou Bouhraoua; Charles Brousse; Jean-Baptiste Chauveau; Hugo Dupont; Mathieu Halbwachs; Benoit Jasmin; Lucas Levy; Pierre Peres; Nicolas Pouplot; Vincent Raclot	Great Britain (GBR); James Cordy-Redden; Samuel Cross; William Davies; Adam Field; Jake Henry; Dorian Jones; Edward Mama; Aaron Myers; Mark Odejobi; William Thomas; Tomos Treharne; Callum Wilson
Women	Russia (RUS); Ekaterina Bankerova; Rusiet Edidzhi; Galina Haet; Ekaterina Kabeeva; Ekaterina Kazakova; Navrat Khamidova; Nadezhda Kudinova; Anna Malygina; Marina Petrova; Anna Prib; Mariya Titova; Svetlana Usatykh	Italy (ITA); Sara Barattin; Anna Barbanti; Debora Felicetti; Marta Ferrari; Manuela Furlan; Elisa Giordano; Miryam Keller; Cristina Molic; Michela Sillari; Sofia Stefan; Claudia Tedeschi; Cecilia Zublena	Canada (CAN); Lindsay Baker; Kehla Guimond; Chelsea Guthrie; Kathleen Keller; Sarah Meng; Brianna Miller; Natasha Smith; Shannon Spurrell; Caroline Suchorski; Karla Telidetzki; Tiera Thomas-Reynolds; Natasha Watcham Roy

== Men ==
Sixteen teams participated in the men's tournament.

=== Teams ===
Pool A

- Russia
- Poland
- Canada
- Ukraine

Pool B

- Great Britain
- Belgium
- Malaysia
- Georgia

Pool C

- South Africa
- Japan
- Namibia
- Latvia

Pool D

- France
- Romania
- Italy
- Brazil

== Women ==
Ten teams participated in the women's tournament.

=== Teams ===
Pool A

- Russia
- France
- Japan
- Canada
- Ukraine

Pool B

- Great Britain
- Italy
- Brazil
- United States
- China
