= Jess Naz =

English footballer

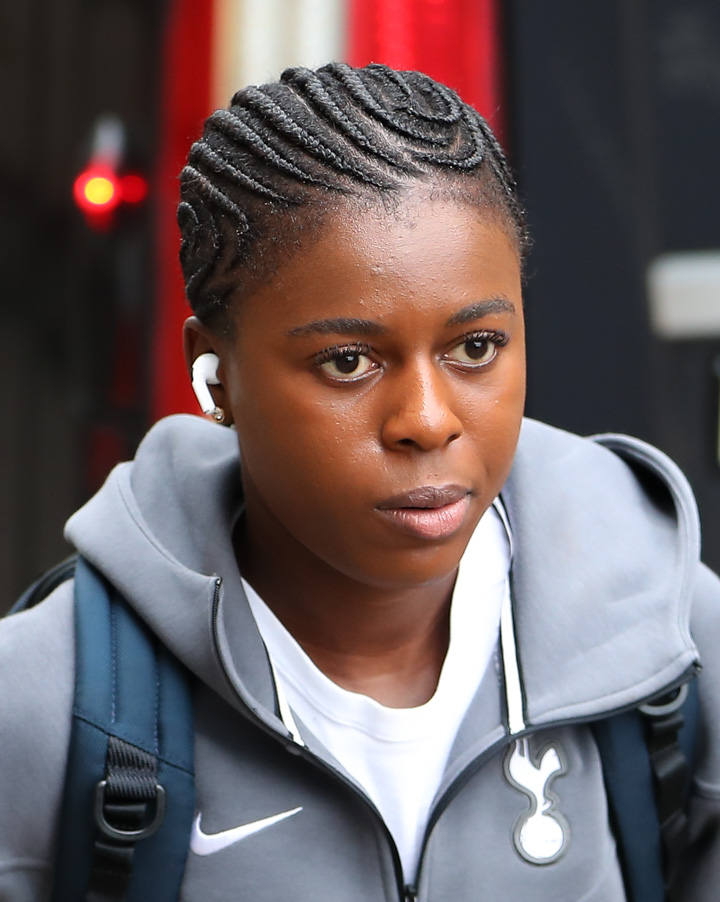
- Naz in 2024

Personal information
- Full name: Jessica Naz
- Date of birth: 24 September 2000 (age 25)
- Place of birth: London, England
- Height: 1.65 m (5 ft 5 in)
- Position: Forward

Team information
- Current team: Tottenham Hotspur
- Number: 7

Youth career
- Tottenham Hotspur
- Arsenal

Senior career*
Years	Team	Apps	(Gls)
2017–2018	Arsenal	2	(0)
2018–	Tottenham Hotspur	112	(13)

International career^{‡}
2016–2017	England U17	6	(4)
2017–2019	England U19	14	(10)
2021–2024	England U23	10	(2)
2024–	England	6	(0)
- * Club domestic league appearances and goals as of 14:36, 17 May 2026 (UTC) ‡ National team caps and goals as of 21:54, 26 February 2025 (UTC)

Jessica Naz (born 24 September 2000) is an English professional footballer who plays as a forward for Women's Super League club Tottenham Hotspur and the England national team. She previously represented England at under-17, under-19 and under-23 youth levels.

== Club career ==
Naz came up through the Tottenham Hotspur academy, but made her senior debut for Arsenal on 23 February 2018, coming on as a substitute for Heather O'Reilly for the last three minutes of Arsenal's 1–0 win over Everton in the 2017–18 season.

Naz rejoined Tottenham later in 2018 and helped Tottenham achieve promotion to the Women's Super League, although she missed the 2019–20 season due to an anterior cruciate ligament injury. She returned from injury in December 2020, and in February 2021, signed a contract extension through June 2022 with an option for an additional year.

In December 2021, Tottenham manager Rehanne Skinner elaborated that she believes Naz could become a more dangerous presence, who is "more than capable of scoring goals on a regular basis".

In March 2022, Naz was named Young Player of the Year at the London Football Awards, beating teammate Esther Morgan in the process. On 30 October 2022, as a substitute in the 2022–23 WSL season, she scored two goals in a humiliating 8–0 defeat for Brighton & Hove Albion.

In February 2023, Naz extended her contract with Tottenham for two and a half years.

On 21 January 2024, as part of the 2023–24 WSL season, and as a substitute, Naz scored a dramatic winning goal in a 4–3 victory over West Ham.

On 9 December 2025, it was announced that Naz had suffered an Anterior cruciate ligament injury (ACL) for the second time in her career and would undergo surgery.

== International career ==
=== Youth ===
Naz has represented England at multiple youth levels, from under-17 up to under-23.

On 1 October 2018, with the under-19 squad in 2019 Under-19 Championship qualification, Naz scored a hat trick in a 9–0 victory against Malta in the opening match of the group stage. In April 2019, she scored a further two goals against Sweden and one against Italy in the elite round, helping the England squad to reach the final tournament, with the team winning all their games in the qualification rounds. On 16 July, Naz scored a late goal against Germany in a 2–1 defeat in the 2019 Under-19 Championship group stage, where England finished in third place in Group B.

In November 2021, Naz was named in the under-23 team, featuring in a 9–0 win against Estonia on 30 November. In February 2022 she was named in the U23 squad for two fixtures against France. In September 2023, Naz featured in matches against Norway and Belgium, as part of the squad for the new U23 European League during the 2023–24 campaign.

In October 2023, Naz was again named in the England squad for the U23 European League. On 18 October, as a substitute, she scored the opening goal in a 2–0 win against Portugal with her first touches of the ball. On 30 November, Naz featured in a match against Spain as a 90th-minute substitute, and on 4 December against France as part of the starting eleven.

=== Senior ===
Naz received her first senior call-up on 14 May 2024 for the four UEFA Euro 2025 qualification matches played that summer. She was initially only named as a standby player, but was promoted to the full squad following the withdrawal of Lauren James through injury. She made her senior debut on 12 July, coming on as a 71st-minute substitute in a 2–1 win against the Republic of Ireland. Naz has been awarded the Legacy number 230 by The Football Association.

Having not played for her national team since February 2025, and missing out on being part of the Euro 2025 squad, Naz was called up as a replacement for Jess Park in the October 2025 friendlies against Brazil and Australia.

== Career statistics ==
=== Club ===
As of match played 16 May 2026

Appearances and goals by club, season and competition
Club	Season	League			FA Cup		League Cup		Total	
Club	Season	Division	Apps	Goals	Apps	Goals	Apps	Goals	Apps	Goals
Arsenal	2017–18	Women's Super League	2	0	0	0	0	0	2	0
Tottenham Hotspur	2018–19	Women's Championship	17	4	1	1	5	0	23	5
Tottenham Hotspur	2019–20	Women's Super League	0	0	0	0	0	0	0	0
Tottenham Hotspur	2020–21	Women's Super League	10	0	2	1	0	0	12	1
Tottenham Hotspur	2021–22	Women's Super League	16	2	1	0	4	0	21	2
Tottenham Hotspur	2022–23	Women's Super League	15	2	0	0	1	0	16	2
Tottenham Hotspur	2023–24	Women's Super League	22	3	5	1	5	3	32	7
Tottenham Hotspur	2024–25	Women's Super League	22	2	1	0	3	1	26	3
Tottenham Hotspur	2025–26	Women's Super League	10	0	0	0	3	0	13	0
Tottenham Hotspur	Total		112	13	10	3	21	4	143	20
Career total			114	13	10	3	21	4	145	20

=== International ===
As of match played 26 February 2025

Appearances and goals by national team and year
National team	Year	Apps	Goals
England	2024	5	0
England	2025	1	0
Total		6	0

== Honours ==
Arsenal

- FA Women's League Cup: winner: 2017-18

Tottenham Hotspur

- Women's Championship: runner-up: 2018-19
- Women's FA Cup: runner-up: 2017–18, 2023–24
