= Kurt Baker (rugby union) =

New Zealand rugby union player and sevens specialist

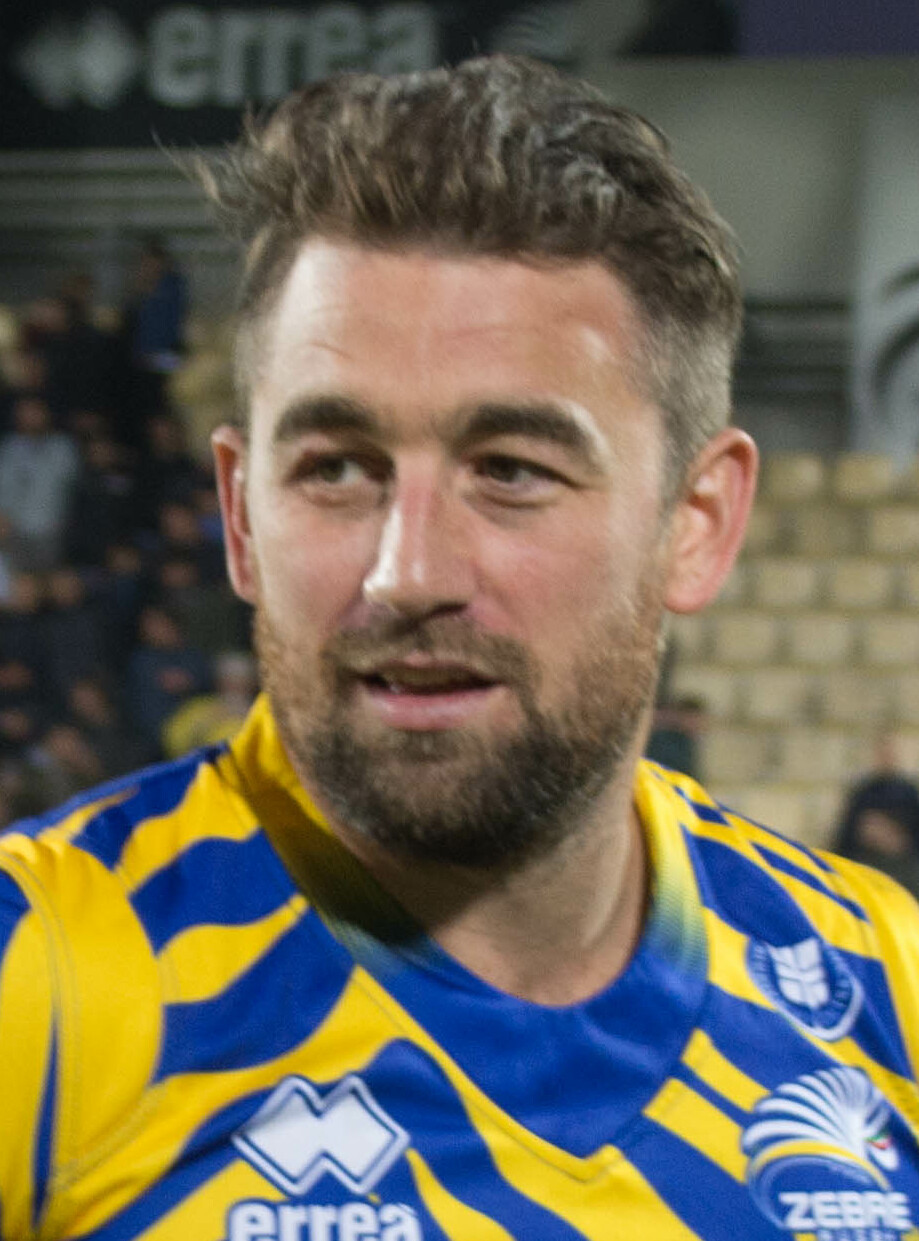
- Baker in 2017
- Full name: Kurt Thomas Baker
- Born: 7 October 1988 (age 38) Palmerston North, New Zealand
- Height: 186 cm (6 ft 1 in)
- Weight: 93 kg (205 lb; 14 st 9 lb)
- School: Palmerston North Boys' High School

Rugby union career
- Position(s): Fullback, Wing
- Current team: Old Glory DC
Senior career
| Years | Team | Apps | (Points) |
| 2008–09, 2017 | Manawatu | 22 | (25) |
| 2010–2015 | Taranaki | 57 | (110) |
| 2012–2015 | Highlanders | 10 | (10) |
| 2016–2017 | Zebre | 11 | (10) |
| 2020 | Hawke's Bay | 12 | (5) |
| 2023– | Old Glory DC | 10 | (12) |
- Correct as of 4 July 2023
International career
| Years | Team | Apps | (Points) |
| 2012–2015 | Māori All Blacks | 7 | (5) |
- Correct as of 1 June 2020
National sevens team
| Years | Team | | Comps |
| 2008–2022 | New Zealand | | 53 |
- Correct as of 8 January 2023
Medal record
Men's rugby sevens
Representing New Zealand
Olympic Games
| Silver medal – second place | 2020 Tokyo | Team competition |
Commonwealth Games
| Gold medal – first place | 2010 Delhi | Team competition |
| Gold medal – first place | 2018 Gold Coast | Team competition |
Rugby World Cup Sevens
| Gold medal – first place | 2013 Russia | Team competition |
| Gold medal – first place | 2018 San Francisco | Team competition |
| Silver medal – second place | 2022 Cape Town | Team competition |

Kurt Baker (born 7 October 1988) is a New Zealand rugby union player, who currently plays as a fullback or wing for Old Glory DC in Major League Rugby (MLR).

Between 2008 and 2022, Baker played for the New Zealand Sevens team in 233 World Rugby Sevens Series games and a total of 53 international tournaments. In his rugby sevens career, he won 12 World Rugby Sevens Series tournaments, five World Rugby Sevens Series titles (2011, 2012, 2013, 2014, 2020), two gold medals at the Commonwealth Games (2010, 2018), two gold medals and one silver medal at the Rugby World Cup Sevens (2013, 2018, 2022) and a silver medal at the Olympic Games (2020).

Baker has also played for the Māori All Blacks.

== Club career ==
=== Manawatu ===
Upon leaving school, Baker was contracted by the Manawatu Rugby Union. In his second year out of school he was a part of Manawatu's 2008 national provincial championship squad. He was spotted by coach Dave Rennie and had signed with Manawatu at just 20 years old. Baker made his debut for Manawatu in the 2008 Air New Zealand Cup competition, coming on as a replacement against Auckland in a Ranfurly Shield match. He went on to make his starting debut against Wellington, whilst also scoring his first professional rugby union try.

Returning to Manawatu for the 2009 Air New Zealand Cup, Baker scored three tries, the province's second top try scorer of the year along with three fellow players. He also was suspended from all rugby for eight weeks after allegedly verbally abusing assistant referee Zarne Johnson in a competition match between Hawke's Bay and Manawatu. Baker was also charged with allegedly threatening Johnson.

=== Highlanders ===
Baker was signed by the Highlanders after an impressive ITM Cup and New Zealand sevens campaign in 2010; he signed a two-year deal with the Otago-based Super Rugby franchise. A stress fracture in his back – which he suffered in Delhi winning gold at the Commonwealth Games – had ruled Baker out of all rugby for three months. Though he was expected to overcome the injury before the 2011 Super Rugby season started, a scan in February showed the fracture had not mended and he was subsequently released by the Highlanders to their wider training group and was then replaced in the Highlanders squad by Kade Poki.

Andre Taylor was Taranaki's preferred fullback throughout 2011, but Baker, who had re-signed with Taranaki through until the end of 2012, was recalled by the Highlanders despite lasting just one full game during the shortened ITM Cup season. He eventually made his debut for the Highlanders in the third round of the 2012 Super Rugby season, coming on as a replacement against the Waratahs in Dunedin. Baker made a further four appearances and scored two tries, one such try against the Blues in round nine saw him chase a kick at pace to what ended up being the winning try.

Baker did not return to the Highlanders for the 2013 Super Rugby season, but instead signed with the Crusaders as a member of their wider training group. In November 2013, Baker returned to the Highlanders after a successful ITM Cup campaign as a member of the Taranaki side that won the 2014 ITM Cup Premiership over Tasman. He signed with the side for two years after putting aside his sevens career to concentrate on Super Rugby.

=== Taranaki ===
In December 2009, Baker decided to move north to Taranaki along with Manawatu teammate Andre Taylor, who both signed with the union on a two-year deal. He made his debut for the province starting at fullback against Northland in round one of the 2010 ITM Cup. After being sidelined throughout the 2011 Super Rugby season with a stress fracture in his back, the injury eventually improved and he managed to play several games for Taranaki in their 2011 ITM Cup campaign. Baker also featured in the squads infamous Ranfurly Shield win over Southland. Heading into the 2012 ITM Cup, he had scored nine tries in nineteen games for the province.

Baker made an immediate impact with his decisive running and ability to spot a gap for Taranaki in 2012. His ability to put a player into space also caught the eye. He finished the year as the first-choice fullback. At the end of the 2013 ITM Cup season, Baker was nominated for the Taranaki Sportsman of the Year award after a stand-out season. While he missed out on that award, Baker was given the Back of the Year award, Personality of the Year award and Try of the Year award for his superb try against Bay of Plenty.

After a six-week ban for a dangerous tackle in the Highlanders' round 8 game against the Rebels, Baker badly tore a hamstring in club rugby in Dunedin. After working his way back to fitness, he finally got a start for Taranaki against Northland in the 2014 ITM Cup, only to suffer an AC joint injury just a few minutes into the game. However, he finished the season on a high, after being a part of Taranaki's narrow victory over Tasman at Yarrow Stadium to win the province's first ITM Cup Premiership title. Baker scored five tries and made a further eleven appearances in 2015.

=== Zebre ===
On 18 June 2016, Italian Pro12 club Zebre announced that Baker would join the Italian club for the 2016–17 season. During that season, Baker played 517 minutes in 9 games (starting in 7) for Zebre and scored one try for the club in their game against Glasgow Warriors. Baker did not return to Zebre for the second year of his contract.

=== Hawke's Bay ===
The Hawke's Bay Rugby Union announced on 3 August 2020 that Baker would join the Hawke's Bay Magpies for the 2020 Mitre 10 Cup season. It proved to be a successful move for Baker. He helped the Magpies win the Ranfurly Shield (taking it off Otago), successfully defend the Shield three times against challenges from Northland, Manawatu and Wellington, and win the Mitre 10 Cup Championship title.

=== Old Glory DC ===
On 9 December 2022, Old Glory DC announced that club had signed Baker for the 2023 Major League Rugby season. He played his first game for his new team on 18 February 2023 against Chicago Hounds and scored a try on debut.

== International career ==
=== New Zealand Sevens ===
Baker was selected in the New Zealand Sevens squad for the opening two rounds of the 2008–09 IRB Sevens World Series in Dubai and George, making his international rugby debut at The Sevens. In 2009, Baker was named in the New Zealand Sevens trial squad, but went on to play in the England, Scotland, Dubai and George Sevens later that year.

In 2010, Baker secured a permanent position in the New Zealand Sevens squad, playing in all six tournaments. In the Hong Kong Sevens, he led the New Zealand team in scoring four tries in their semi-final win over Fiji and two tries in their Cup final loss to Samoa. He was also the top individual try scorer and point scorer of the tournament. Later in 2010, Baker was named in Gordon Tietjens' squad for the Commonwealth Games in Delhi, India. He was a stand-out in the final against Australia, coming on as a replacement and scoring one of the winning tries to ensure the team the gold medal.

Baker was named as a non-travelling reserve for the All Blacks Sevens squad for the 2022 Commonwealth Games in Birmingham. He featured at the 2022 Rugby World Cup Sevens in Cape Town. He won a silver medal after his side lost to Fiji in the gold medal final.

Baker announced his retirement from international rugby sevens after the 2022 Dubai Sevens.

=== Māori All Blacks ===
Although the then 24-year-old Baker had only played seven matches for the Highlanders, Jamie Joseph, the Māori All Blacks coach, selected him for the 2012 UK end of year tour to England, playing against domestic club team Leicester Tigers, a specially made RFU Championship XV, and ending against the Canadian national team.

== Personal life ==
Baker is a New Zealander of Māori descent (Ngāpuhi descent).

== Career honours ==
- Taranaki - 2014 ITM Cup Premiership
- Hawke's Bay - 2020 Mitre 10 Cup Championship
- Highlanders - 2015 Super Rugby
- New Zealand 7s - 2013 Rugby World Cup Sevens, 2018 Rugby World Cup Sevens, 2010 Commonwealth Games, 2018 Commonwealth Games, 2020 Tokyo Olympics Silver Medalist

Awards
| Preceded by (New Zealand) Tomasi Cama | Richard Crawshaw Memorial; Sevens Player of the Year; 2013 | Succeeded by (New Zealand) DJ Forbes |
