= Tim Mikkelson =

New Zealand rugby union player

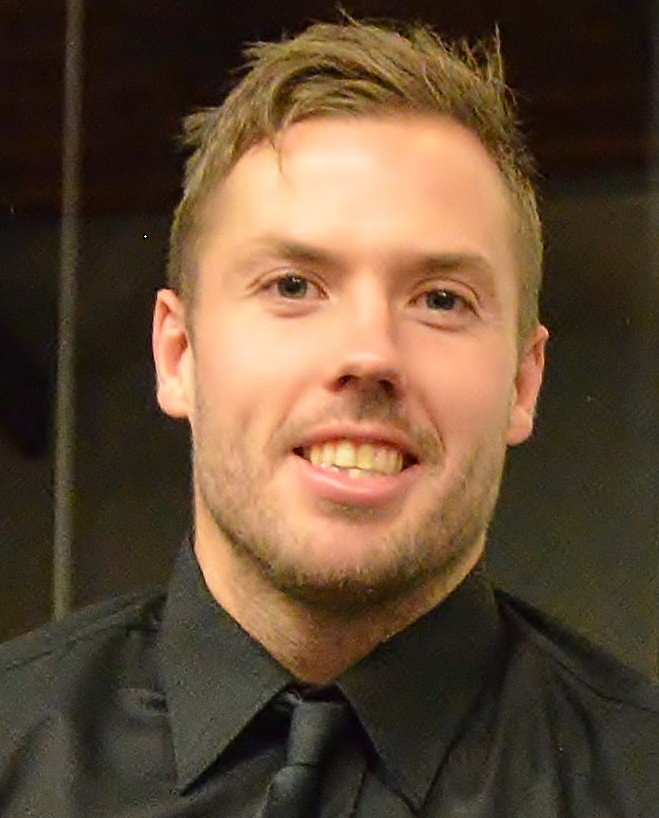
- Mikkelson representing New Zealand during a reception for athletes
- Full name: Timothy John Mikkelson
- Born: 13 August 1986 (age 40) Matamata, New Zealand
- Height: 1.94 m (6 ft 4 in)
- Weight: 101 kg (223 lb)
- School: Matamata College

Rugby union career
- Position(s): Wing, Fullback
Senior career
Years	Team	Apps	(Points)
2008–2013	Waikato	62	(95)
2009–2010	Chiefs	4	(0)
- Correct as of 1 December 2023
National sevens team
Years	Team		Comps
2011–2024	New Zealand		79
- Correct as of 1 December 2023
Medal record
Men's rugby sevens
Representing New Zealand
Summer Olympics
Silver medal – second place	2020 Tokyo	Team competition
Commonwealth Games
Gold medal – first place	2010 Delhi	Team competition
Gold medal – first place	2018 Gold Coast	Team competition
Silver medal – second place	2014 Glasgow	Team competition
Rugby World Cup Sevens
Gold medal – first place	2013 Russia	Team competition
Gold medal – first place	2018 San Francisco	Team competition

Timothy John Mikkelson (born 13 August 1986) is a New Zealand professional rugby union player who plays as a forward for the New Zealand national sevens team.

== International career ==
Mikkelson plays for the New Zealand national rugby sevens team and is the most capped player in the team's history, surpassing former captain DJ Forbes record when he played his 90th tournament in Los Angeles in 2020. Mikkelson was then named player of the tournament for the 2013 Rugby Sevens World Cup and also received IRB Sevens Player of the Year for the 2012–13 season.

Mikkelson has scored more than 200 career tries for New Zealand in the World Rugby Sevens Series, putting him third on the all-time try scorers list in that competition.

Mikkelson has also played rugby for the Chiefs and for Waikato.
