= England women's national under-21 football team =

England Women's U-21
- Nickname: The Young Lionesses
- Association: The Football Association
- Confederation: UEFA (Europe)
- Head coach: Mo Marley
- FIFA code: ENG
First colours	Second colours

FIFA U-20 Women's World Cup
- Appearances: 5 (first in 2002)
- Best result: Third place, 2018

The England women's national under-21 football team, also known as England women Under-21s or England women U21(s), was a youth association football team operated under the auspices of The Football Association. Its primary role was the development of players in preparation for the senior England women's national football team. In 2021, the England women's under-23 team replaced the purpose of the under-21 team, in order to increase the opportunities for young players.

The U21 team was reinstated as an age group from 2018 until 2021. During this era, the team helped develop players after each U-20 World Cup. They took part in the Nordic Cup, previously contested by the then defunct U23s, and in non-World Cup years (bi-annually). It provided a World Cup-type programme to keep the flow and consistency of preparation for England seniors.

== History ==
=== Beginnings ===
In February 1987 the Women's Football Association (WFA) appointed Liz Deighan to run a women's national under-21 team. Deighan had been a star midfielder in the England team which reached the 1984 European Competition for Women's Football. Four years later Deighan was not re–appointed and John Bilton took over. The team folded shortly afterwards because the WFA had run out of money. Eight of England's squad at the 1995 FIFA Women's World Cup had come through Deighan's U-21 team, including Pauline Cope, Karen Burke and Louise Waller.

=== FA sanctioned team ===
In summer 2004, The Football Association (FA) decided to reconstitute the U-21 team in order to give women a higher level of play to better prepare them for the full national team. Senior team manager Hope Powell held a four-day camp in Shropshire and announced: "This is a major step forward for our international teams and will bridge the gap between Under-19 and Senior levels. We have been observing players in this age bracket for the last six months and with the clubs' assistance I believe we can make this a real success." Powell installed her full-time assistant with the senior team, Brent Hills, as coach of the team, which remained an U-21 selection from 2004 through 2008.

=== Competing as an U-23 team (2008–2018) ===
2008 saw the change of England's youth national women's team moved to the U-23 level. The move was made by the FA in response to age-level changes FIFA had made to its oldest women's youth competition, now named FIFA U-20 Women's World Cup. The age limit was raised from being a U-19 tournament to a U-20 tournament. This adjustment, coupled with a newly introduced U-23 age limit to the Nordic Cup, prompted the FA to rethink and eventually change the youth development team.

=== Return of U-21 team (2018–2021) ===
Following a review in September 2018, the FA announced the amalgamation of the U23s and U20s squads to reform an Under-21s age group, which would become the top tier of the nation's new professional development phase. The move would align England's structure to that used in other European countries to allow for more age-appropriate games and better manage individual player development post-U20 World Cup for those who have genuine senior team potential. The FA's head of women's development Kay Cossington and senior team manager Phil Neville stressed the move as an important part of the wider, long-term plan prior to the following summer's World Cup. The then U20s manager Mo Marley was announced as the team's first head coach.

=== Move back to U-23 team (2021–present) ===
In October 2021, the FA announced the return of an under-23 team as newly appointed senior manager Sarina Wiegman looked to increase international playing opportunities for promising players in the senior pathway, particularly those who had aged out of the under-21 squad. Mo Marley was appointed head coach and tasked with also mentoring Emma Coates and Fara Williams as coaches. The move came off the back of the cancellation of two editions of the UEFA Women's Under-19 Championship and one FIFA U-20 Women's World Cup as a result of the COVID-19 pandemic, further limiting opportunities for youth international experience.

== Eligibility ==
Although most national football teams represent a sovereign state, as a member of the United Kingdom's Home Nations, England is permitted by FIFA statutes to maintain its own national side that competes in all major tournaments.

Every player must meet FIFA eligibility rules. However, as long as they are eligible, players can play for England at any level, making it possible to play for the U21s, the senior side, and then again for the U21s provided they also meet the age restrictions. It is also possible to play for one country at youth level and another at senior level.

== Latest players ==
The following 19 players were named to the squad for a double-header of friendlies against France in March 2020.
Head coach: Rehanne Skinner

No.	Pos.	Player	Date of birth (age)	Club
	GK	Charlotte Clarke	21 August 2000 (age 26)	(The Football Association) Stoke City
	GK	Emily Ramsey	16 November 2000 (age 25)	(The Football Association) Manchester United
	DF	Niamh Cashin	24 February 2000 (age 26)	(United States Soccer Federation) Rider Broncs
	DF	Megan Finnigan	2 April 1998 (age 28)	(The Football Association) Everton
	DF	Taylor Hinds	25 September 1999 (age 27)	(The Football Association) Liverpool
	DF	Esme Morgan	18 October 2000 (age 26)	(The Football Association) Manchester City
	DF	Maz Pacheco	25 August 1998 (age 28)	(The Football Association) West Ham United
	DF	Poppy Pattinson	30 April 2000 (age 26)	(The Football Association) Everton
	DF	Lotte Wubben-Moy	11 January 1999 (age 27)	(United States Soccer Federation) North Carolina Tar Heels
	MF	Amelia Hazard	22 October 2000 (age 26)	(The Football Association) London Bees
	MF	Aimee Palmer	25 July 2000 (age 26)	(The Football Association) Bristol City
	MF	Chloe Peplow	3 December 1998 (age 27)	(The Football Association) Tottenham Hotspur
	MF	Connie Scofield	26 May 1999 (age 27)	(The Football Association) Birmingham City
	MF	Emily Syme	23 July 2000 (age 26)	(The Football Association) Aston Villa
	MF	Ella Toone	2 September 1999 (age 27)	(The Football Association) Manchester United
	FW	Angela Addison	9 December 1999 (age 26)	(The Football Association) Tottenham Hotspur
	FW	Hannah Cain	11 February 1999 (age 27)	(The Football Association) Leicester City
	FW	Niamh Charles	21 June 1999 (age 27)	(The Football Association) Chelsea
	FW	Rianna Dean	21 October 1998 (age 28)	(The Football Association) Tottenham Hotspur

== Coaches ==
- (England) Mo Marley (2018–2021)

== Bibliography ==
- Lopez, Sue (1997). Women on the Ball: A Guide to Women's Football. London, England: Scarlet Press. ISBN 1857270169.
