= Great Britain at the 2013 Summer Universiade =

- IOC code: GBR
- NOC: British Olympic Association
- Website: www.olympics.org.uk

in Kazan
- Competitors: 100+ in 9 sports
- Medals Ranked 37th: Gold 1 Silver 1 Bronze 4 Total 6

Summer Universiade appearances
- 1959; 1961; 1963; 1965; 1967; 1970; 1973; 1975; 1977; 1979; 1981; 1983; 1985; 1987; 1989; 1991; 1993; 1995; 1997; 1999; 2001; 2003; 2005; 2007; 2009; 2011; 2013; 2015; 2017; 2019; 2021; 2025; 2027

Great Britain competed at the 2013 Summer Universiade in Kazan, Russia.

== Badminton ==
Great Britain was represented by five badminton players.

=== Men ===
Athlete	Event	Round of 32	Round of 16	Quarterfinals	Semifinals	Final	
Athlete	Event	Opposition Score	Opposition Score	Opposition Score	Opposition Score	Opposition Score	Rank
James Bonsels	Singles						
Harley Towler; Peter Briggs	Doubles						

=== Women ===
Athlete	Event	Round of 32	Round of 16	Quarterfinals	Semifinals	Final	
Athlete	Event	Opposition Score	Opposition Score	Opposition Score	Opposition Score	Opposition Score	Rank
Sophie Brown; Emma Smethurst	Doubles						

== Fencing ==
Great Britain was represented by three fencers.

Athlete	Event	Round of 64	Round of 32	Round of 16	Quarterfinal	Semifinal	Final / BM	
Athlete	Event	Opposition Score	Opposition Score	Opposition Score	Opposition Score	Opposition Score	Opposition Score	Rank
Marcus Mepstead		(United States) Michael Woo; W 15–11	(Ukraine) Andriy Pogrebnyak; L 15–11	did not advance				
		(France)	(China)	(Israel)	(Russia)			
Alexander Tofalides		(Portugal) Gael Santos; W 15–4	(Japan) Daima Onizawa; W 7–15	did not advance				

== Football ==
=== Men's tournament ===
Great Britain was represented by both a men's and women's team.

The men's team participated in Group C.

Roster

Name	University
James Aldred	Lynn University
James Baldwin	Hartpury College
James Belshaw	Duke University
Alex Dyer	Open University
Marcus Giglio	Hartpury College
Luke Graham	Staffordshire University
Tim Horn	University of Salford
Joe Lolley	University of Central Lancashire
Sam Macvicar	Loughborough University
Gavin Malin	Heriot-Watt University
Tom McCready	Limestone College
Craig Moses	University of Glamorgan
Kieran Murphy	St. Mary's University College
George Nash	Loughborough University
Marc Newsham	Manchester Metropolitan University
Nicky Platt	University of Salford
Simon Richman	Manchester University
Jack Winter	Lynn University
Jake Parrott	Hartpury College
Michael Rae	Leeds Metropolitan University

Head coach: James Ellis
Team manager: Stew Fowlie
Assistant team manager: Ross Campbell

Group play

Team	Pld	W	D	L	GF	GA	GD	Pts
Great Britain	2	1	0	1	2	1	+1	3
Malaysia	2	1	0	1	2	2	0	3
Italy	2	1	0	1	1	2	−1	3

8 July 2013
17:00

Great Britain	2–0	Malaysia
Aldred 19'; Dyer 49'	Report

Olymp Stadium
Referee: Alexandr Aliyev (Kazakhstan)

10 July 2013
17:00

Great Britain	0–1	Italy
	Report	Masi 68'

Olymp Stadium
Referee: Oleksandr Derdo (Ukraine)
12 July 2013
20:00

Great Britain	1–0	Ukraine
Malin 1' (pen.)	Report

Trudovye Rezervy Stadium
Referee: Antonio Damato (Italy)

Quarter final

14 July 2013
20:00

Russia	1–1	Great Britain
Dyadyun 68'	Report	Rae 80'
Penalties
Dyadyun (penalty missed); Bezlikhotnov (penalty scored); Nikitin (penalty scored); Golubev (penalty scored)	3–5	(penalty scored) Platt; (penalty scored) Dyer; (penalty scored) Winter; (penalty scored) Richman; (penalty scored) Moses

Rubin Stadium
Referee: Diego Haro (Peru)

Gold medal match

16 July 2013
20:00

France	3–2 (a.e.t.)	Great Britain
Sotoca 18'; Winter 51' (o.g.); Weyders 113'	Report	Rae 68', 90+3'

Rubin Stadium
Referee: Antonio Damato (Italy)

=== Women's tournament ===
The women's team participated in Group C.

Roster

Name	University
Ashley Baker	University of Georgia
Mary Earps	Loughborough University
Dan Gibbons	University of Central Lancashire
Jemma Rose	University of St Mark & St John
Kerys Harrop	Loughborough University
Victoria Williams	University of Hertfordshire
Sam Chappel	University of Salford
Naomi Cole	University of Chichester
Grace McCatty	University of Bath
Michelle Hinnigan	University of Salford
Kasia Lipka	University of Leeds
Isobel Christiansen	University of Birmingham
Courtney Sweetman-Kirk	Nottingham Trent University
Aileen Whelan	Nottingham Trent University
Danielle Carter	University of Hertfordshire
Demi Stokes	University of South Florida
Fran Kirby	Bucks New University
Beth Donoghue	Edge Hill University
Katie Stanley	University of Bridgeport
Billie Ann Murphy	University of Leeds

Head coach: Kay Cossington
Assistant coach: Rehanne Skinner
Goalkeeper coach: Steven Fraser
Team manager: Alex Zurita

Group play

Team	Pld	W	D	L	GF	GA	GD	Pts
Japan	3	2	0	1	9	2	+7	6
Great Britain	3	2	0	1	8	3	+5	6
Brazil	3	2	0	1	6	2	+4	6
Estonia	3	0	0	3	1	17	−16	0

Source: Kazan 2013

Group play

5 July 2013
17:00

Brazil	0–2	Great Britain
	Report	Kirby 62'; Whelan 81'

Raketa Stadium
Referee: Irina Tereshchenko (Russia)
7 July 2013
17:00

Japan	2–1	Great Britain
Sugita 3', 53'	Report	Lipka 50'

Raketa Stadium
Referee: Marina Mamaeva (Russia)

Quarter finals

11 July 2013
17:00

Republic of Ireland	0–8	Great Britain
	Report	Sweetman-Kirk 1', 51', 52'; Hinnigan 32' (pen.); Kirby 37', 61'; Carter-Loblack 49', 87'

Trudovye Rezervy Stadium
Referee: Rikako Kuwahara (Japan)

Semi-final

13 July 2013
20:00

Brazil	0–1	Great Britain
	Report	Carter-Loblack 65'

Rubin Stadium
Referee: Park Ji-Yeong (Korea Republic)

Gold Medal Match

15 July 2013
20:00

Great Britain	6–2	Mexico
Cole 18'; Christiansen 36'; Kirby 82', 88'; Whelan 87'; Carter-Loblack 90+1'	Report	Monsiváis 10'; Corral 26'

Rubin Stadium
Referee: Rikako Kuwahara (Japan)

== Gymnastics ==
Great Britain was represented in artistic gymnastics.

=== Artistic gymnastics ===
Eight gymnasts competed in the artistic gymnastics competition.

== Judo ==
Great Britain was represented by three male judokas and one female judoka.

=== Men ===
Athlete	Event	Round of 32	Round of 16	Quarterfinals	Semifinals	Repechage	Bronze Medal	Final	
Athlete	Event	Opposition Result	Opposition Result	Opposition Result	Opposition Result	Opposition Result	Opposition Result	Opposition Result	Rank
Patrick Dawson	–73 kg								
Thomas Reed	–81 kg								
Andrew Burns	–90 kg								

=== Women ===
Athlete	Event	Round of 32	Round of 16	Quarterfinals	Semifinals	Repechage	Bronze Medal	Final	
Athlete	Event	Opposition Result	Opposition Result	Opposition Result	Opposition Result	Opposition Result	Opposition Result	Opposition Result	Rank
Megan Fletcher	–70 kg	(Russia) Margarita Gurtsieva	(Cuba) Onix Cortés Aldama	(Japan) Karen Nun-Ira	did not advance				

== Rugby sevens ==
Great Britain was represented by both a men's and women's team.

=== Men's tournament ===
The men's team participated in Group B.

Roster

Name	University
Sam Cross	Cardiff Metropolitan University
Dante Mama	Loughborough University
Aaron Myers	Teesside University
Callum Wilson	Loughborough University
Adam Field	Cardiff University
Dorian Jones	Cardiff Metropolitan University
Jake Henry	Cardiff Metropolitan University
Mark Odejobi	Brunel University
James Cordy-Redden	University of the West of England
Rhodri Davies	Cardiff Metropolitan University
Will Thomas	Cardiff Metropolitan University
Luke Treharne	University of Exeter

Head coach: Russell Earnshaw
Assistant coach: Nick Wakley
Team manager: Adrian Evans

Group play

Team	GP	W	D	L	PF	PA	PD	Pts
Great Britain	3	3	0	0	107	12	+95	9
Belgium	3	2	0	1	71	10	+61	7
Georgia	3	1	0	2	40	69	−29	5
Malaysia	3	0	0	3	10	137	−127	3

14 July 2013
11:12

Great Britain	59–5	Malaysia
	Report

Tulpar Stadium

14 July 2013
15:36

Great Britain	38–0	Georgia
	Report

Tulpar Stadium

15 July 2013
14:46

Great Britain	10–7	Belgium
	Report

Tulpar Stadium

Quarter final

16 July 2013
12:34

Great Britain	31–5	Japan
	Report

Tulpar Stadium

Semi-final

16 July 2013
17:18

Russia	17–14	South Africa
	Report

Tulpar Stadium

Bronze medal match

17 July 2013
12:05

South Africa	14–31	Great Britain
	Report

Tulpar Stadium

=== Women's tournament ===
The women's team participated in Group B.

Roster

Name	University
Garnet Mackinder	University of Birmingham
Katie Mason	University of Bath
Amy Wilson-Hardy	University of Bath
Sarah McKenna	University of Bedfordshire
Nia Davies	Cardiff Metropolitan University
Deborah Fleming	University of Bath
Siobhan Longdon-Hughes	Cardiff Metropolitan University
Megan Ellery	Durham University
Heike Niemand	Leeds Metropolitan University
Kate Hancock	University of Plymouth
Kay Wilson	Cardiff Metropolitan University
Lucy Demaine	Peninsula Medical School

Head coach: Susie Appleby
Assistant coach: Rhys Edwards
Team manager: Sophie Bennett

Group Play

Team	GP	W	D	L	PF	PA	PD	Pts
Great Britain	4	4	0	0	115	39	+76	12
China	4	2	0	2	64	67	−3	8
Italy	4	1	1	2	67	67	0	7
Brazil	4	1	1	2	44	78	−34	7
United States	4	1	0	3	32	71	−39	6

14 July 2013
14:08

Great Britain	35–0	China
	Report

Tulpar Stadium

14 July 2013
17:04

Great Britain	24–19	Italy
	Report

Tulpar Stadium

15 July 2013
10:44

Great Britain	35–10	Brazil
	Report

Tulpar Stadium

15 July 2013
13:40

Great Britain	21–10	United States
	Report

Tulpar Stadium

Quarter finals

16 July 2013
10:22

Great Britain	12–7	France
	Report

Tulpar Stadium

semi final

16 July 2013
17:40

Great Britain	5–14	Italy
	Report

Tulpar Stadium

Bronze medal match

17 July 2013
11:40

Canada	36–0	Great Britain
	Report

Tulpar Stadium

== Shooting ==
Great Britain was represented by ten athletes.

=== Men ===
Athlete	Event	Qualification		Final	
Athlete	Event	Points	Rank	Points	Rank
Kristian Callaghan	10 metre air pistol				
Michael Bamsey	10 metre air rifle				
Kristian Callaghan	25 metre standard pistol				
Kristian Callaghan	25 metre rapid fire pistol				
Kristian Callaghan	50 metre pistol				
Ben Monksummers	50 metre rifle prone				
Jonty Barron	50 metre rifle prone				
Michael Bamsey	50 metre rifle prone				
Michael Bamsey	50 metre rifle three positions				
Thomas Skinner	Skeet				
Henry Bales	Skeet				

=== Women ===
Athlete	Event	Qualification		Final	
Athlete	Event	Points	Rank	Points	Rank
Jessica Liddon	10 metre air pistol	357	54	did not advance	
Kirsty Liddon	10 metre air pistol	349	49	did not advance	
Kathryn Williamson	10 metre air rifle	389	61	did not advance	
Hannah Pugsley	10 metre air rifle	405	48	did not advance	
Kathryn Williamson	50 metre rifle prone				
Hannah Pugsley	50 metre rifle prone				
Hannah Pugsley	50 metre rifle three positions	565	35	did not advance	

== Swimming ==
Great Britain was represented by eleven swimmers.

== Tennis ==
Great Britain was represented by six tennis players.
