= Eni Gesinde =

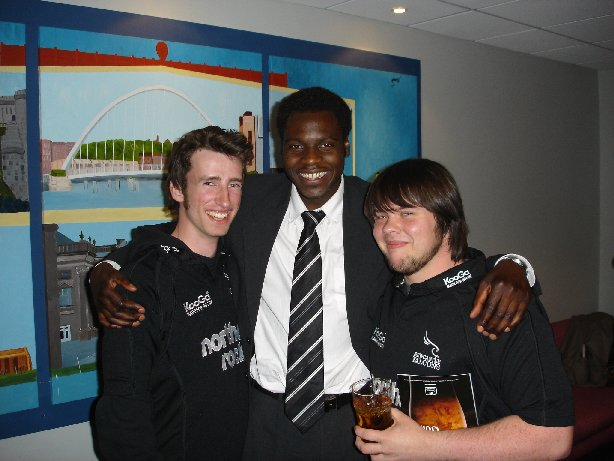
- Eni (centre) with a pair of fans
- Born: Eniola Gesinde; 25 November 1982 (age 43) Lagos, Nigeria
- Height: 6 ft 4 in (1.93 m)
- Weight: 15 st 8 lb (99 kg)
- School: Woodhouse Grove School
- University: Northumbria University

Rugby union career
- Position: Lock / Flanker
- Current team: Newcastle Falcons
Youth career
- Darlington Mowden Park
Senior career
Years	Team	Apps	(Points)
- Leeds Tykes
2006 ‐	Newcastle Falcons	8	(5)
National sevens team
Years	Team		Comps
- England

Eniola 'Eni' Gesinde is a rugby union footballer and current Newcastle Falcons senior academy member.

Eni was born in Lagos, Nigeria, before moving to England as a child. He represented Yorkshire at U-18s level before joining the Newcastle Falcons academy. Using his natural power and pace he scored a number of tries for the Development team.

Eni has captained the Falcons development team on a number of occasions and has recently led the Newcastle Falcons sevens team to a hat trick of victories in the Scottish Borders sevens, winning the Hawick, Melrose and Langham sevens titles with Gesinde playing an integral role throughout.

On 4 September 2006, Eni was named as part of the extended England sevens squad for the 06/07 season by Mike Friday.

On Sunday 17 September Eni made his Newcastle Falcons 1st team debut, coming off the bench in the 72nd minute during the 44-20 defeat to Saracens.
