= Igor Galinovskiy =

- Born: November 8, 1985 (age 41)
- Height: 5 ft 11 in (1.80 m)
- Weight: 192 lb (87 kg)

Rugby union career
International career
Years	Team	Apps	(Points)
2006-	Russia	50	(90)
National sevens team
Years	Team		Comps
- Russia
Medal record
Men's rugby sevens
Representing Russia
Summer Universiade
Gold medal – first place	2013 Kazan	Team competition

Igor Galinovskiy (Russian: Игорь Галиновский; born 8 November 1985) is a Russian rugby union footballer. He plays as a wing.

He has 50 caps for Russia, with 18 tries scored, 90 points in aggregate, from 2006 to 2018.

He is best known for scoring a hat-trick at the 2006 London Sevens Tournament against Australia at Twickenham. This meant Russia had a shock win against the rugby giants, 21-5.
