= Mark Odejobi =

English rugby union player

- Full name: Mark Tunde O. Odejobi
- Born: 18 January 1988 (age 38) Southwark, England
- Height: 1.78 m (5 ft 10 in)
- Weight: 100 kg (15 st 10 lb; 220 lb)
- School: Millfield School
- University: Brunel University

Rugby union career
- Position(s): Flanker, Wing
Senior career
Years	Team	Apps	(Points)
2006–2011	London Wasps		
2007–2008	London Welsh (loan)		
2011–	Esher		
2011–	Redingensians		
Medal record
Men's rugby sevens
Representing Great Britain
Summer Universiade
Bronze medal – third place	2013 Kazan	Team competition

Mark Tunde O. Odejobi (born 18 January 1988, in London, England) is a former professional rugby union player for Esher in the Aviva Championship. He previously played for London Wasps in the Premiership. He also had a loan spell at London Welsh. Up until 2009 he played at winger. At the start of 2010 he started playing in his new position at flanker. His nickname is Oddjob.

Educated at Dulwich College & Millfield School.

In November 2011, Mark joined National Division 3 South West side Redingensians, for whom he plays on the wing.
