= Angela Addison =

English association football player

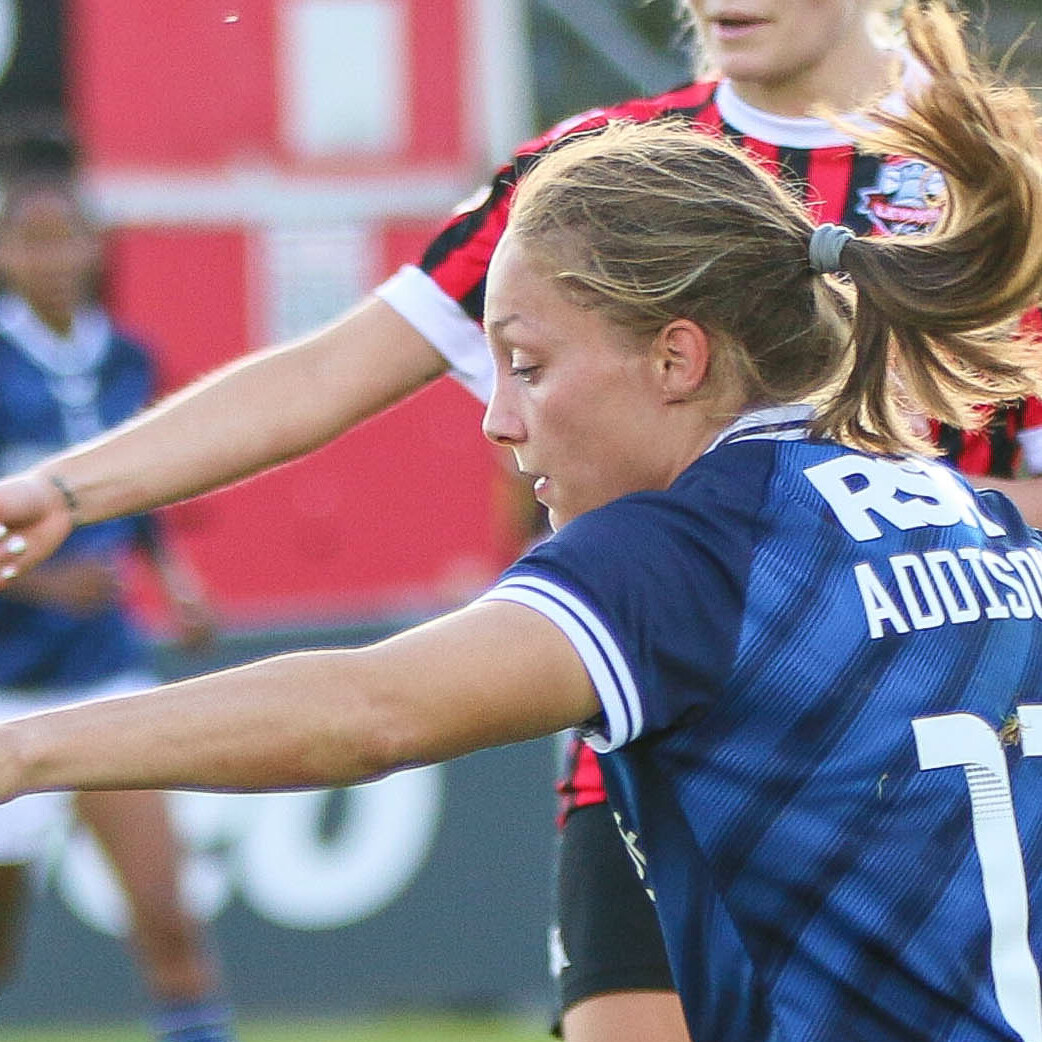
- 2022 against Lewes

Personal information
- Date of birth: 9 December 1999 (age 26)
- Place of birth: Chelmsford, England
- Height: 5 ft 1 in (1.55 m)
- Position: Forward

Team information
- Current team: Durham W.F.C.
- Number: 18

Youth career
- C&K Basildon

Senior career*
Years	Team	Apps	(Gls)
2016–2018	C&K Basildon	33	(22)
2018–2022	Tottenham Hotspur	66	(10)
2022–2024	Charlton Athletic	42	(5)
2024-2025	Ipswich Town	11	(4)
2025-	Durham W.F.C.		

International career^{‡}
2020	England U21	1	(0)
2021	England U23	6	(2)
- * Club domestic league appearances and goals as of 12:50, 10 April 2025 (BST) ‡ National team caps and goals as of 12:50, 10 April 2025 (BST)

Angela Addison (born 9 December 1999) is an English professional footballer who plays as a forward for Durham W.F.C, playing in England's Women's Super League 2.

== Club career ==
=== C&K Basildon ===
Addison debuted for C&K Basildon's senior team in their 2016–17 FA Women's Premier League season, making 16 appearances and scoring 11 goals. In the 2017–18 FA WPL season, Addison's final season with C&K Basildon, she made 26 appearances and scored 23 goals across all competitions. After the season concluded Addison joined former WPL opponents Tottenham Hotspur, moving up to the FA Women's Championship and playing semi-professional football for the first time.

=== Tottenham Hotspur ===
Addison signed with Tottenham Hotspur in July 2018, in the leadup to the club's second season in the second division. She made her first appearance for the club on 19 September 2018 in a match away to Leicester City as a substitute for fellow midfielder Sarah Wiltshire. Later in the season during Spurs' home fixture against Leicester City, she once again was used as a substitute and this time scored the game-winning goal during stoppage time. This feat and her previous performances that month saw her nominated for FA Women's Championship Player of the Month award for February. She scored six goals in 19 matches during the 2018–19 FA Women's Championship season and helped Spurs secure promotion to the FA Women's Super League for the first time.

In July 2019 it was announced that Addison was among the players Tottenham retained from their Championship squad for their debut WSL season. This was her first professional football contract. Addison scored her first professional hat-trick vs Lewes in the FA Women's League Cup on the 11th of December 2019. The hat-trick was completed in four minutes and helped Tottenham to a 6–0 victory.

On 26 February 2021 Addison signed a new contract with Spurs through the end of 2022 with an option to extend for another year. Addison scored her second professional hat-trick in Spurs' 11–0 win over Watford in the League Cup on 17 November 2021.

Following the end of her contract, on the 28 May 2022 Tottenham announced that Addison would be leaving the club along with Josie Green and Rachel Williams. She was at the club for four seasons in which she scored 19 goals in 90 games.

=== Charlton Athletic ===
Addison then signed with Charlton Athletic in the FA Women's Championship in July 2022 where she became a mainstay starter for a side which secured a 4th place finish in the league.

The following season, Addison remained a key player in an improved Charlton Athletic side which finish 2nd in the FA Women's Championship and only one point off winners Crystal Palace.

Following the conclusion of the 23/24 season, Addison left the club following the expiration of her contract.

=== Ipswich Town ===
In July 2024, Addison signed with Ipswich Town in the FA Women's National League South in a bid to gain promotion back to the FA Women's Championship. As a child, Addison had spent several years in Ipswich's girls' academy.

After a strong start to the season with 11 goal contributions in 16 games in all competitions, Addison's season was cut short due to her first career injury.

=== Durham W.F.C. ===
On 7 July 2025, it was announced that Addison had joined Women's Super League 2 side Durham, with her signing being unveiled at Durham Cathedral.

== International career ==
Addison received her first call up for the England women's national under-21 football team in February 2020. She subsequently had her first cap in a friendly against France's under-20 team on 8 March 2020. In October 2021 Addison received her first call up to the England women's national under-23 football team, but she along with her Spurs teammates were recalled from the camp. The following month Addison made her first appearance at an England under-23 camp.

== Personal life ==
Angela has a twin sister, Therese, who also plays football. The twins both spent time playing together at C&K Basildon and Tottenham Hotspur. Angela goes by the nickname "A" stemming from the years that herself and Therese, known as "T", played at the same clubs and shared the pitch together.

== Career statistics ==
=== Club ===
As of match played 10 April 2025

Appearances and goals by club, season and competition
Club	Season	League			National cup (Note: Includes FA Cup)		League cup (Note: Includes Continental Cup, National League Cup, Essex County Cup)		Total	
Club	Season	Division	Apps	Goals	Apps	Goals	Apps	Goals	Apps	Goals
C&K Basildon	2016–17	Women's National League South	11	5	1	0	4	6	16	11
C&K Basildon	2017–18	Women's National League South	22	17	1	0	4	6	27	23
Tottenham Hotspur	2018–19	Women's Championship	19	6	2	0	4	0	25	6
Tottenham Hotspur	2019–20	Women's Super League	7	1	3	0	3	3	13	4
Tottenham Hotspur	2020–21	Women's Super League	21	2	3	0	3	1	27	3
Tottenham Hotspur	2021–22	Women's Super League	19	1	1	1	5	4	25	6
Charlton Athletic	2022–23	Women's Championship	22	2	3	1	3	0	28	3
Charlton Athletic	2023–24	Women's Championship	20	3	3	1	2	0	25	4
Ipswich Town	2024–25	Women's National League South	11	4	2	2	3	1	16	7
Total			152	41	19	5	31	21	202	67
England U21	2020–21	England women's national under-21 football team	0	0	0	0	0	0	1	0
England U23	2021–23	England women's national under-23 football team	0	0	0	0	0	0	6	2
Total			-	-	-	-	-	-	7	2
Career total			152	41	19	5	31	21	209	69
