= Rugby sevens at the 2013 Summer Universiade – Men's tournament =

Men's rugby sevens at the XXVII Summer Universiade
- Venues: Tulpar Stadium; Dinamo Stadium (training)
- Dates: July 14, 2013 – July 17, 2013
- Teams: 16

Medalists
1st place, gold medalist(s)		Russia (RUS)
2nd place, silver medalist(s)		France (FRA)
3rd place, bronze medalist(s)		Great Britain (GBR)

The men's tournament of rugby sevens at the 2013 Summer Universiade was held from July 14 to 17 in Kazan, Russia.

== Preliminary round ==
=== Group A ===
Team	GP	W	D	L	PF	PA	PD	Pts
Russia	3	3	0	0	128	5	+123	9
Poland	3	2	0	1	63	53	+10	7
Canada	3	1	0	2	61	81	−20	5
Ukraine	3	0	0	3	12	125	−113	3

14 July 2013
10:28

Russia	45–0	Canada
	Report

Tulpar Stadium

14 July 2013
10:50

Poland	34–0	Ukraine
	Report

Tulpar Stadium

14 July 2013
14:52

Russia	45–0	Ukraine
	Report

Tulpar Stadium

14 July 2013
15:14

Poland	24–15	Canada
	Report

Tulpar Stadium

15 July 2013
11:28

Canada	46–12	Ukraine
	Report

Tulpar Stadium

15 July 2013
14:24

Russia	38–5	Poland
	Report

Tulpar Stadium

=== Group B ===
Team	GP	W	D	L	PF	PA	PD	Pts
Great Britain	3	3	0	0	107	12	+95	9
Belgium	3	2	0	1	71	10	+61	7
Georgia	3	1	0	2	40	69	−29	5
Malaysia	3	0	0	3	10	137	−127	3

14 July 2013
11:12

Great Britain	59–5	Malaysia
	Report

Tulpar Stadium

14 July 2013
11:34

Belgium	26–0	Georgia
	Report

Tulpar Stadium

14 July 2013
15:36

Great Britain	38–0	Georgia
	Report

Tulpar Stadium

14 July 2013
15:58

Belgium	38–0	Malaysia
	Report

Tulpar Stadium

15 July 2013
11:50

Malaysia	5–40	Georgia
	Report

Tulpar Stadium

15 July 2013
14:46

Great Britain	10–7	Belgium
	Report

Tulpar Stadium

=== Group C ===
Team	GP	W	D	L	PF	PA	PD	Pts
South Africa	3	3	0	0	116	33	+83	9
Japan	3	2	0	1	80	50	+30	7
Latvia	3	1	0	2	44	94	−50	5
Namibia	3	0	0	3	38	101	−63	3

14 July 2013
11:56

South Africa	41–12	Namibia
	Report

Tulpar Stadium

14 July 2013
12:18

Japan	28–15	Latvia
	Report

Tulpar Stadium

14 July 2013
17:48

South Africa	47–7	Latvia
	Report

Tulpar Stadium

14 July 2013
18:10

Japan	38–7	Namibia
	Report

Tulpar Stadium

15 July 2013
12:12

Namibia	19–22	Latvia
	Report

Tulpar Stadium

15 July 2013
15:08

South Africa	28–14	Japan
	Report

Tulpar Stadium

=== Group D ===
Team	GP	W	D	L	PF	PA	PD	Pts
France	3	3	0	0	79	24	+55	9
Italy	3	2	0	1	48	48	+0	7
Brazil	3	1	0	2	29	65	−36	5
Romania	3	0	0	3	31	50	−19	3

14 July 2013
12:40

France	24–12	Italy
	Report

Tulpar Stadium

14 July 2013
13:02

Romania	7–17	Brazil
	Report

Tulpar Stadium

14 July 2013
18:32

France	36–0	Brazil
	Report

Tulpar Stadium

14 July 2013
18:54

Romania	12–14	Italy
	Report

Tulpar Stadium

15 July 2013
12:34

Italy	22–12	Brazil
	Report

Tulpar Stadium

15 July 2013
15:30

France	19–12	Romania
	Report

Tulpar Stadium

== Elimination round ==
The elimination round will be split into three tiers: in descending order, the medal, plate, and bowl tiers. The top two finishers of each group in the preliminary round will move on to the medal tier for a chance to compete for medals, while the rest of the teams will be relegated to the bowl section of the elimination round. The losers of the medal tier quarterfinals will play in the plate tier, and the losers of the bowl tier quarterfinals will play classification games.

=== Bowl tier ===
Quarterfinals
A3	Canada	17
D4	Romania	14
C3	Latvia	15
B4	Malaysia	12
D3	Brazil	17
A4	Ukraine	0
B3	Georgia	40
C4	Namibia	7

Semifinals
A3	Canada	19
C3	Latvia	0
D3	Brazil	12
B3	Georgia	22

Final
A3	Canada	12
B3	Georgia	26

==== Quarterfinals ====
15 July 2013
19:00

Canada	17–14	Romania
	Report

Tulpar Stadium

15 July 2013
19:22

Latvia	15–12	Malaysia
	Report

Tulpar Stadium

15 July 2013
19:44

Brazil	17–0	Ukraine
	Report

Tulpar Stadium

15 July 2013
20:06

Georgia	40–7	Namibia
	Report

Tulpar Stadium

==== Classification ====
16 July 2013
15:06

Romania	24–7	Malaysia
	Report

Tulpar Stadium

16 July 2013
15:28

Ukraine	19–45	Namibia
	Report

Tulpar Stadium

==== Semifinals ====
16 July 2013
15:50

Canada	19–0	Latvia
	Report

Tulpar Stadium

16 July 2013
16:12

Brazil	12–22	Georgia
	Report

Tulpar Stadium

==== Final ====
17 July 2013
10:25

Canada	12–26	Georgia
	Report

Tulpar Stadium

=== Plate tier ===
Semifinals
D2	Italy	10
B2	Belgium	12
A2	Poland	7
C2	Japan	33

Final
B2	Belgium	19
C2	Japan	10

==== Semifinals ====
16 July 2013
16:34

Italy	10–12	Belgium
	Report

Tulpar Stadium

16 July 2013
16:56

Poland	7–33	Japan
	Report

Tulpar Stadium

==== Final ====
17 July 2013
11:15

Belgium	19–10	Japan
	Report

Tulpar Stadium

=== Medal tier ===
Quarterfinals
A1	Russia	39
D2	Italy	0
C1	South Africa	26
B2	Belgium	12
D1	France	24
A2	Poland	5
B1	Great Britain	31
C2	Japan	5

Semifinals
A1	Russia	17
C1	South Africa	14
D1	France	33
B1	Great Britain	12

Gold-medal game
A1	Russia	29
D1	France	19
Bronze-medal game
C1	South Africa	14
B1	Great Britain	31

==== Quarterfinals ====
16 July 2013
11:28

Russia	39–0	Italy
	Report

Tulpar Stadium

16 July 2013
11:50

South Africa	26–12	Belgium
	Report

Tulpar Stadium

16 July 2013
12:12

France	24–5	Poland
	Report

Tulpar Stadium

16 July 2013
12:34

Great Britain	31–5	Japan
	Report

Tulpar Stadium

==== Semifinals ====
16 July 2013
17:18

Russia	17–14	South Africa
	Report

Tulpar Stadium

16 July 2013
17:30

France	33–12	Great Britain
	Report

Tulpar Stadium

==== Bronze-medal match ====
17 July 2013
12:05

South Africa	14–31	Great Britain
	Report

Tulpar Stadium

==== Gold-medal match ====
17 July 2013
12:55

Russia	29–19	France
	Report

Tulpar Stadium

== Final standings ==
Place	Team
1st place, gold medalist(s)	Russia
2nd place, silver medalist(s)	France
3rd place, bronze medalist(s)	Great Britain
4	South Africa
5	Belgium
6	Japan
7	Italy
7	Poland
9	Georgia
10	Canada
11	Latvia
11	Brazil
13	Romania
13	Namibia
15	Malaysia
15	Ukraine
