= Facundo Panceyra Garrido =

- Born: 24 November 1990 (age 35) Córdoba, Argentina
- Height: 1.92 m (6 ft 4 in)
- Weight: 102 kg (225 lb; 16 st 1 lb)

Rugby union career
- Position: Centre
- Current team: Valorugby Emilia
Senior career
Years	Team	Apps	(Points)
2014−2016	Tala	10	(5)
2016−2018	Soyaux Angoulême	22	(30)
2018−2022	Calvisano	65	(108)
2022−2024	Valorugby Emilia	2	(0)
- Correct as of 15 October 2020
International career
Years	Team	Apps	(Points)
2012−2014	Argentina Sevens	103	(110)
- Correct as of 15 October 2020

Facundo Panceyra Garrido (Note: In this Spanish name, the first or paternal surname is Panceyra and the second or maternal family name is Garrido.) (born 24 November 1990 in Córdoba) was an Argentine rugby union player. His usual position was as a Centre and he played for Valorugby Emilia in Italian Top10 from 2022 to 2024. From 2024 he is Sporting Director.

From 2012 to 2014 he was named in the Argentina Sevens for World Rugby Sevens Series and Rugby World Cup Sevens.
