= John Brake (rugby union, born 1988) =

English rugby union footballer

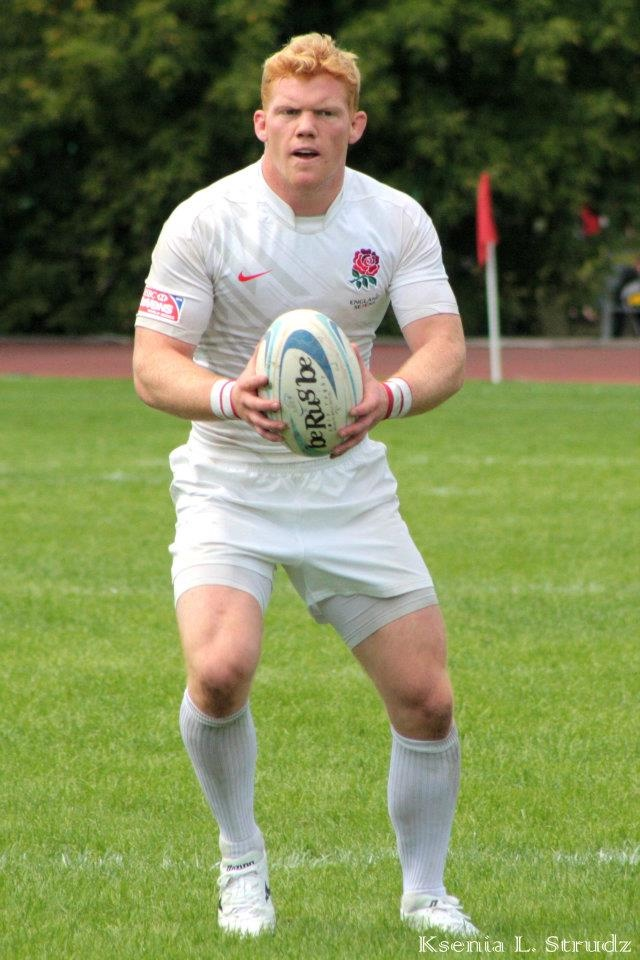
- Brake at the European Grand Prix 7's 2012
- Born: John Brake; 22 April 1988 (age 38) London, England
- Height: 5 ft 9 in (1.75 m)
- Weight: 14 st 0 lb (89 kg)
- School: Millfield

Rugby union career
- Position: Scrum-half
- Current team: Retired
Youth career
- 2006–2007: Northampton Saints Academy
Senior career
Years	Team	Apps	(Points)
2007–2010	Northampton Saints		
2008–2010	Birmingham and Solihull		
National sevens team
Years	Team		Comps
2007–2016	England		

John Brake (born 22 April 1988) was a professional rugby union player for England Sevens in the IRB Sevens World Series. Brake's position of choice in the 15-a-side code is Scrum-half.

== Club career ==
After joining the academy side at Northampton Saints in 2006, Brake went on to make his National League debut for the senior side against Bedford Blues in the RFU Championship during the 2007–2008 campaign. He went on to make a further seven appearances throughout the season and scored a try against Launceston RUFC. At the end of his debut senior season Northampton achieved promotion back to the Guinness Premiership. Brake went onto represent Northampton Saint for 4 seasons. .In August 2010 Brake left Northampton Saints and signed for England Sevens and Birmingham and Solihull on a dual contract. He left the Bees at the end of the 2010–2011 season to pursue a central contract with the England Sevens Squad.

In 2021, Brake made the decision to convert codes and play Australian Rules Football. He made his debut for the London Swans and won the 2021 premiership in an undefeated side with a close to best on ground performance.

== International career ==
Brake represented England as a schoolboy at Millfield at under-16 and under-18 levels. After leaving and joining Northampton he progressed to the under-20 side and made his debut for the England Sevens team in San Diego in 2007.

Brake went on to represent England Sevens for 6 seasons, playing in 41 World Series Tournaments, 2 Commonwealth Games in Delhi 2010 and Glasgow 2014, 1 Sevens World Cup in Moscow 2013 and 10 European Tournaments

Brake captained the winning England Sevens team in the 2012 European Sevens Grand Prix.
