= Gordon Tietjens =

NZ rugby union player & coach

Gordon Tietjens KNZM
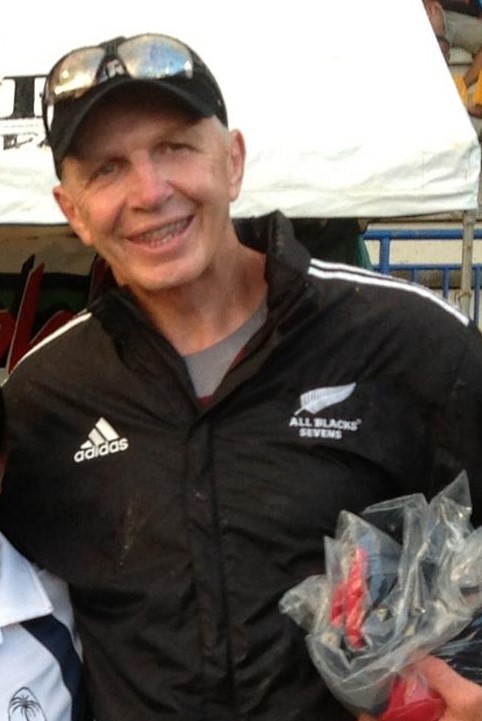
- Tietjens in Fiji
- Born: Gordon Frederick Tietjens; 9 December 1955 (age 70) Rotorua, New Zealand
- Height: Unknown

Rugby union career
Provincial / State sides
Years	Team	Apps	(Points)
1977–1982	Bay of Plenty	81	
1983	Waikato	14	
1984–1986	Bay of Plenty		
National sevens team
Years	Team		Comps
1983	New Zealand Sevens		1
Coaching career
- Years: Team
- 1994–2016: New Zealand Sevens
- 1996–2002: Bay of Plenty
- 2016–2020: Samoa national sevens team

Sir Gordon Frederick Tietjens KNZM (/ˈtɪtʃənz/; born 9 December 1955) is a celebrated former coach of the New Zealand men's national team in rugby sevens, the All Blacks Sevens. He spent 22 years in this role. He was also head coach of the Samoa rugby sevens team for four years.

When the International Rugby Board inducted him into the IRB Hall of Fame in May 2012, it said that "Tietjens' roll of honour is without peer in Sevens, and perhaps in the game of rugby as a whole." According to Spiro Zavos, Tietjens is "The greatest of all the Sevens coaches".

As of his induction, he had coached the All Blacks Sevens to 10 series titles in the IRB Sevens World Series, the Rugby World Cup Sevens crown in 2001, and gold medals in four of the five Commonwealth Games in which the sport had been contested, losing the 2014 final in Glasgow. He has also added two more IRB Sevens series titles (2013 and 2014), and a second Rugby World Cup Sevens crown (also in 2013).

== Player development ==
Tietjens has coached many young players who have gone on to become All Blacks, including Christian Cullen, Jonah Lomu, Joe Rokocoko, Mils Muliaina, Rico Gear, Cory Jane, Ben Smith, Rieko Ioane, Israel Dagg, and Liam Messam. Tietjens coached 44 players who went on to become All Blacks in the 15-a-side game and before his retirement, he was the only remaining active international coach from the amateur era.

Tietjens is currently assisted by Eric Rush, a former long-serving captain of the New Zealand Sevens team and a former Sevens star himself.

== Olympics ==
In 2012, his contract as the NZ Sevens coach was extended through to 2016. This allows Tietjens to be part of Sevens rugby's first inclusion in the Olympic Games. According to then-World Rugby chairman Bernard Lapasset, sevens' inclusion in the Olympics was "in no small way down to Gordon Tietjens. Through his knowledge, passion, and expertise, he has driven the standards towards what we now celebrate as a truly global game of sevens."

In the 1999 New Year Honours, Tietjens was appointed a Member of the New Zealand Order of Merit (MNZM); in the 2007 New Year Honours, he was elevated to Companion of the same order (CNZM), and in the 2013 Queen's Birthday Honours, he was further promoted to a Knight Companion of the New Zealand Order of Merit (KNZM).

After an unsuccessful 2016 Olympics campaign, Tietjens stepped down from the All Black Sevens coaching position.

== Samoa ==
In October 2016, Tietjens accepted the role of coach to the Samoa national sevens team. In 2020, he announced that he would be stepping down from the head coaching role for the Samoa national sevens team stating that he wanted Samoa to be able to plan for the future.

== Achievements ==
- Playing honours: New Zealand Barbarians
- Member of the first national New Zealand Hong Kong Sevens Team (1983)
- New Zealand Sevens Head Coach (1994–2016)
- IRB Sevens World Series Champions (2000, 2001, 2002, 2003, 2004, 2005, 2007, 2008, 2011, 2012, 2013 & 2014)
- Rugby World Cup Sevens Champions (2001 & 2013)
- Commonwealth Games Rugby Sevens Gold Medalist (1998, 2002, 2006 & 2010)
- NPC Coach of the Year in (2000 for Bay of Plenty)
- NZRU Coach of the Year (2010)
- IRB Hall of Fame Member
- Knight Companion of The New Zealand Order of Merit
