= Rehanne Skinner =

English football manager

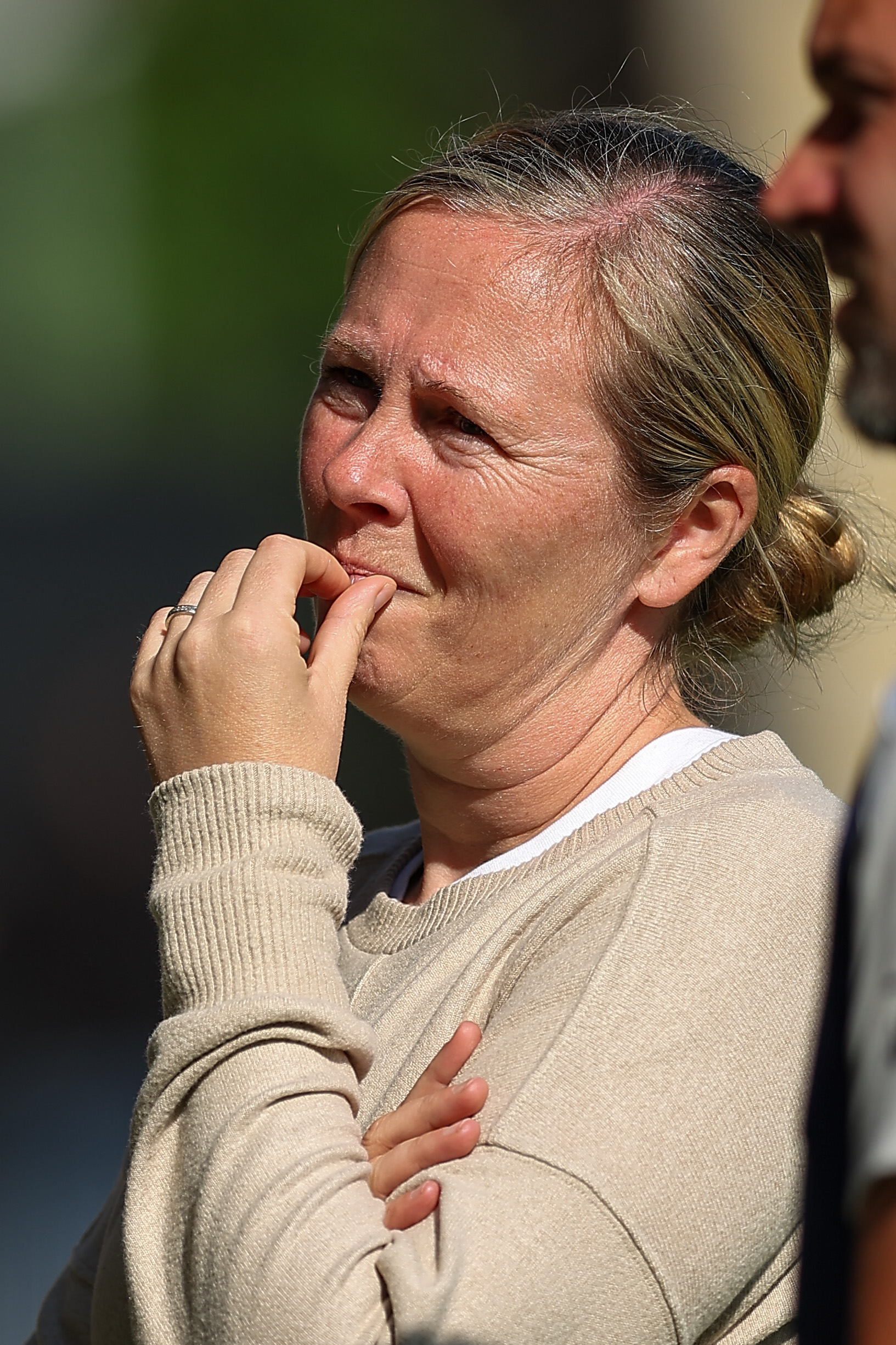
- Skinner in 2025

Personal information
- Date of birth: 13 November 1979 (age 46)
- Place of birth: England

Team information
- Current team: Sunderland AFC Women

Senior career*
Years	Team	Apps	(Gls)
- Middlesbrough
- Leicester City

Managerial career
- 2006–2010: Leicester City
- 2010–2013: Arsenal (assistant)
- 2013: Great Britain Universiade (assistant)
- 2016-2017: Wales U19
- 2016–2017: Wales (assistant)
- 2016–2017: Wales U17 (assistant)
- 2017–2020: England U19/U20/U21
- 2020: England (assistant)
- 2020–2023: Tottenham Hotspur
- 2023–2025: West Ham United
- 2026-: Sunderland (technical director)
- * Club domestic league appearances and goals

Rehanne Skinner (born 13 November 1979) is an English football manager who currently serves as the technical director of the Women's Super League 2 club Sunderland AFC.

== Coaching career ==
=== Early coaching career ===
Earlier in her career, Skinner worked with Leicester City as the Girls Centre of Excellence Director & Football in the Community Manager. Co-creating the Women's 1st team in 2004, Skinner played for the team before taking over as Women's First Team Manager in 2006. In May 2010 she joined Arsenal as Ladies First Team Assistant Manager for the inaugural Women's Super League Season. The team won the domestic treble in 2011 and progressed to the Semi Final of the UEFA Women's Champions League. In 2012, the team retained the Women's Super league title & FA Women's League Cup Trophy & UWCL Semi Final. Prior to moving to the USA, Skinner was appointed as the Assistant Coach representing Team GBR for British Universities and Colleges Sport at the 2013 Summer Universiade where the team beat Mexico 5-2 in the final to win the Gold Medal for the first time in history. Moving to the United States she worked for Florida's Massive Soccer, coaching male & female players aspiring for college scholarships. On 4 May 2016 Skinner was announced as an assistant manager for the Wales women's national team & U17 team alongside Head Coach of the U19 national teams.

=== England national teams ===
Skinner started her career in national team coaching for the U15 team in 2006 which continued across multiple age groups between 2006 - 2013. In September 2017, just over a year after taking on her coaching roles with Wales, she returned to the England women's national team program as the U19 head coach. Qualifying for the 2018 UEFA Women's Under-19 Championship began just a month later, and Skinner would lead England through a perfect group stage in the qualifying round, with three wins and no losses. The Elite round of qualifying took place in April 2018 and saw England miss out on qualifying for the tournament in their final group stage match, losing to Germany who then finished three points ahead in their group.

The following year she led England to a perfect qualifying record for the 2019 tournament, with three wins out of three matches in the Elite round of qualification. England did not fare as well in the final tournament, despite winning against Belgium, the loses to Germany & Spain prevented them from progressing out of the group phase. In the 2019-20 season Skinner moved up to the England U23 Head Coach working closely with the Lionesses for player pathway development.

Her role with the England national teams evolved over time, and she became the England women’s national head coach, leading squads in the whole of the U18-U23s range. She was then appointed as assistant coach of the England women's national football team under head coach Phil Neville starting in September 2020. Skinner's stint with the senior team would end far earlier than initially planned, with her leaving her position in November 2020.

=== Tottenham Hotspur ===
On 19 November 2020, Skinner was appointed as the new head coach of Tottenham Hotspur, replacing long time managers Karen Hills and Juan Carlos Amorós. Spurs were in 11th place, just one spot above last place and relegation, having secured only three points from three draws in seven league matches. On 6 December 2020 in her first match in charge, Skinner led the club to their first win of the 2020–21 FA WSL season with a 3-1 victory over Brighton & Hove Albion. Spurs would finish the season in 8th place, well clear of relegation and just a place under where the club finished in their first WSL campaign the previous season.

Skinner's first full season in charge of Spurs would see the team reach new heights. Spurs' second match of the 2021–22 season on 12 September saw them beat Manchester City for the first time in team history. The defeat was City's first at home in the WSL since April 2018. This was Spurs' first win against a member of the "top four" sides of Arsenal, Chelsea, and Manchester United. That November Spurs would take their first ever point from Manchester United and Arsenal after drawing 1–1 against both sides in consecutive matches. Skinner led Spurs out of the group stage of the League Cup for the first time. Spurs would beat Liverpool in the quarter-finals to advance to their first ever semi-final in any major cup competition, but would bow out of the competition after a loss to eventual champions Manchester City. Spurs would end the season in fifth place, their highest ever finish in the WSL. Skinner would earn a nomination for WSL Manager of the Season, a first for a Tottenham manager.

On 13 March 2023, Skinner was sacked after a run of nine straight league defeats which left the club third bottom in the league.

=== West Ham United ===
On 20 July 2023, Skinner was announced as the new first team manager of West Ham United, becoming their first female manager of the FA WSL era.

On 18 December 2025, it was announced Skinner had been sacked, after the club only won one game in eleven and were second from bottom of the table.

=== Sunderland AFC ===
On 29 June 2026, Skinner was announced as the technical director of Sunderland AFC Women.
