= Esther Morgan (footballer) =

Wales international footballer (born 2002)

Personal information
- Full name: Esther Rowena Morgan
- Date of birth: 28 August 2002 (age 24)
- Position: Defender

Team information
- Current team: Bristol City

Youth career
- Tottenham Hotspur
- Millwall Lionesses
- –2021: Chelsea

Senior career*
| Years | Team | Apps | (Gls) |
| 2021–2023 | Tottenham Hotspur | 8 | (0) |
| 2022 | → Leicester City (loan) | 2 | (0) |
| 2022 | → Coventry United (loan) | 2 | (0) |
| 2023 | → Sunderland (loan) | 6 | (0) |
| 2023–2025 | Heart of Midlothian | 15 | (0) |
| 2025 | Sheffield United | 9 | (0) |
| 2025– | Bristol City | 0 | (0) |

International career^{‡}
| 2018–2019 | Wales U17 | 10 | (0) |
| 2019 | Wales U19 | 3 | (0) |
| 2021– | Wales | 11 | (0) |
- * Club domestic league appearances and goals as of 23 May 2025 ‡ National team caps and goals as of 3 June 2025

Esther Rowena Morgan (born 28 August 2002) is a professional footballer who plays as a defender for Bristol City in the Women's Super League 2. Born in England, she has been capped by the Wales national team.

== Club career ==
At the age of 18, Morgan made her debut for Tottenham Hotspur on 28 February 2021. On 20 May 2021, in succession of both her club and international debuts, Morgan signed her first professional contract with Tottenham Hotspur; a one-year deal with the option of a further year.

In February 2022, Morgan was loaned to fellow FA WSL club Leicester City until the end of the season.

On 13 September 2022, it was announced that Morgan would be joining Coventry United on a one year loan.

In January 2023, she joined Sunderland on loan.

She joined Hearts Women upon her release from Tottenham in July 2023, signing a two-year deal.

Following time on loan with Sheffield United, on 15 August 2025 it was announced that Morgan had signed a two-year contract with Women's Super League 2 side Bristol City.

== International career ==
Morgan made her debut for the senior national team on 9 April 2021 during a friendly against Canada at age 18. As of June 2025, she has 11 Senior caps.

She previously captained the under-19 team, with 3 appearances, and made 10 appearances for the WU17s in 2018–19.

In June 2025, Morgan was named in Wales' squad for UEFA Women's Euro 2025.

=== International appearances ===
As of matches played 3 June 2025. Statistics from the Football Association of Wales

Appearances and goals by national team and year
| National team | Year | Apps | Goals |
|---|---|---|---|
| Wales | 2021 | 6 | 0 |
| Wales | 2023 | 3 | 0 |
| Wales | 2024 | 0 | 0 |
| Wales | 2025 | 2 | 0 |
| Total | | 11 | 0 |
