= 2019 Algarve Cup squads =

Lists of the squads for the 2019 Algarve Cup

This article lists the squads for the 2019 Algarve Cup, the 26th edition of the Algarve Cup. The cup consisted of a series of friendly games, and was held in the Algarve region of Portugal from 27 February to 6 March 2019. The twelve national teams involved in the tournament registered a squad of 23 players.

The age listed for each player is as of 27 February 2019, the first day of the tournament. The numbers of caps and goals listed for each player do not include any matches played after the start of tournament. The club listed is the club for which the player last played a competitive match prior to the tournament. The nationality for each club reflects the national association (not the league) to which the club is affiliated. A flag is included for coaches that are of a different nationality than their own national team.

== Group A ==
=== Canada ===
Coach: (Denmark) Kenneth Heiner-Møller

The squad was announced on 16 February 2019.

No.	Pos.	Player	Date of birth (age)	Club
1	GK	Stephanie Labbé	October 10, 1986 (aged 32)	(United States Soccer Federation) North Carolina Courage
2	DF	Allysha Chapman	January 25, 1989 (aged 30)	(United States Soccer Federation) Houston Dash
3	DF	Kadeisha Buchanan	November 5, 1995 (aged 23)	(French Football Federation) Lyon
4	DF	Shelina Zadorsky	October 24, 1992 (aged 26)	(United States Soccer Federation) Orlando Pride
5	MF	Quinn (Note: Then known as Rebecca Quinn)	August 11, 1995 (aged 23)	(French Football Federation) Paris FC
6	FW	Deanne Rose	March 3, 1999 (aged 19)	(United States Soccer Federation) Florida Gators
7	MF	Julia Grosso	August 29, 2000 (aged 18)	(United States Soccer Federation) Texas Longhorns
8	MF	Diana Matheson	April 6, 1984 (aged 34)	(United States Soccer Federation) Utah Royals
9	FW	Jordyn Huitema	May 8, 2001 (aged 17)	(Canadian Soccer Association) Vancouver Whitecaps
10	DF	Ashley Lawrence	June 11, 1995 (aged 23)	(French Football Federation) Paris Saint-Germain
11	MF	Desiree Scott	July 31, 1987 (aged 31)	(United States Soccer Federation) Utah Royals
12	FW	Christine Sinclair (captain)	June 12, 1983 (aged 35)	(United States Soccer Federation) Portland Thorns
13	MF	Sophie Schmidt	June 28, 1988 (aged 30)	Unattached
14	MF	Gabrielle Carle	October 12, 1998 (aged 20)	(United States Soccer Federation) Florida State Seminoles
15	FW	Nichelle Prince	February 19, 1995 (aged 24)	(United States Soccer Federation) Houston Dash
16	FW	Janine Beckie	August 20, 1994 (aged 24)	(The Football Association) Manchester City
17	MF	Jessie Fleming	March 11, 1998 (aged 20)	(United States Soccer Federation) UCLA Bruins
18	GK	Erin McLeod	February 26, 1983 (aged 36)	(Swedish Football Association) Växjö
19	FW	Adriana Leon	October 2, 1992 (aged 26)	(The Football Association) West Ham United
20	DF	Shannon Woeller	January 31, 1990 (aged 29)	(Swedish Football Association) Eskilstuna United
21	GK	Kailen Sheridan	July 16, 1995 (aged 23)	(United States Soccer Federation) Sky Blue
22	DF	Lindsay Agnew	March 31, 1995 (aged 23)	(United States Soccer Federation) Houston Dash
23	DF	Jenna Hellstrom	April 2, 1995 (aged 23)	(Swedish Football Association) Örebro

=== Iceland ===
Coach: Jón Þór Hauksson

The squad was announced on 15 February 2019.

No.	Pos.	Player	Date of birth (age)	Club
1	GK	Bryndís Lára Hrafnkelsdóttir	11 January 1991 (aged 28)	(Football Association of Iceland) Þór/KA
2	DF	Sif Atladóttir	15 July 1985 (aged 33)	(Swedish Football Association) Kristianstads
3	MF	Þórdís Hrönn Sigfúsdóttir	19 November 1993 (aged 25)	(Swedish Football Association) Kristianstads
4	DF	Glódís Perla Viggósdóttir	27 June 1995 (aged 23)	(Swedish Football Association) Rosengård
5	MF	Gunnhildur Yrsa Jónsdóttir	28 September 1988 (aged 30)	(Football Australia) Adelaide United
6	DF	Ingibjörg Sigurðardóttir	7 October 1997 (aged 21)	(Swedish Football Association) Djurgården
7	MF	Sara Björk Gunnarsdóttir (captain)	29 September 1990 (aged 28)	(German Football Association) Wolfsburg
8	MF	Sigríður Lára Garðarsdóttir	11 March 1994 (aged 24)	(Football Association of Iceland) ÍBV
9	FW	Margrét Lára Viðarsdóttir	25 July 1986 (aged 32)	(Football Association of Iceland) Valur
10	MF	Dagný Brynjarsdóttir	10 August 1991 (aged 27)	(United States Soccer Federation) Portland Thorns
11	DF	Hallbera Guðný Gísladóttir	14 September 1986 (aged 32)	(Football Association of Iceland) Valur
12	GK	Sandra Sigurðardóttir	2 October 1986 (aged 32)	(Football Association of Iceland) Valur
13	GK	Sonný Lára Þráinsdóttir	9 December 1986 (aged 32)	(Football Association of Iceland) Breiðablik
14	DF	Guðrún Arnardóttir	29 July 1995 (aged 23)	(Swedish Football Association) Djurgården
15	MF	Selma Sól Magnúsdóttir	23 April 1998 (aged 20)	(Football Association of Iceland) Breiðablik
16	FW	Elín Metta Jensen	1 March 1995 (aged 23)	(Football Association of Iceland) Valur
17	FW	Agla María Albertsdóttir	5 August 1999 (aged 19)	(Football Association of Iceland) Breiðablik
18	FW	Ásta Eir Árnadóttir	23 August 1993 (aged 25)	(Football Association of Iceland) Breiðablik
19	DF	Anna Björk Kristjánsdóttir	14 October 1989 (aged 29)	(Royal Dutch Football Association) PSV
20	FW	Berglind Björg Þorvaldsdóttir	18 January 1992 (aged 27)	(Royal Dutch Football Association) PSV
21	MF	Svava Rós Guðmundsdóttir	11 November 1995 (aged 23)	(Swedish Football Association) Kristianstads
22	FW	Rakel Hönnudóttir	30 December 1988 (aged 30)	(The Football Association) Reading
23	MF	Andrea Rán Snæfeld Hauksdóttir	28 January 1996 (aged 23)	(Football Association of Iceland) Breiðablik

=== Scotland ===
Coach: Shelley Kerr

The squad was announced on 13 February 2019. Zoe Ness replaced Emma Mitchell after her withdrawal from the squad.

No.	Pos.	Player	Date of birth (age)	Club
1	GK	Lee Alexander	23 September 1991 (aged 27)	(Scottish Football Association) Glasgow City
2	DF	Kirsty Smith	6 January 1994 (aged 25)	(The Football Association) Manchester United
3	MF	Zoe Ness	24 March 1996 (aged 22)	(The Football Association) Durham
4	DF	Rachel Corsie (captain)	17 August 1989 (aged 29)	(Football Australia) Canberra United
5	DF	Jen Beattie	13 May 1991 (aged 27)	(The Football Association) Manchester City
6	MF	Joanne Love	6 December 1985 (aged 33)	(Scottish Football Association) Glasgow City
7	MF	Hayley Lauder	4 June 1990 (aged 28)	(Scottish Football Association) Glasgow City
8	MF	Kim Little	29 June 1990 (aged 28)	(The Football Association) Arsenal
9	MF	Caroline Weir	20 June 1995 (aged 23)	(The Football Association) Manchester City
10	MF	Leanne Crichton	6 August 1987 (aged 31)	(Scottish Football Association) Glasgow City
11	DF	Nicola Docherty	23 August 1992 (aged 26)	(Scottish Football Association) Glasgow City
12	GK	Shannon Lynn	22 October 1985 (aged 33)	(Swedish Football Association) Vittsjö
13	FW	Jane Ross	18 September 1989 (aged 29)	(The Football Association) West Ham United
14	MF	Chloe Arthur	21 January 1995 (aged 24)	(The Football Association) Birmingham City
15	MF	Joelle Murray	7 November 1986 (aged 32)	(Scottish Football Association) Hibernian
16	MF	Christie Murray	3 May 1990 (aged 28)	(The Football Association) Liverpool
17	DF	Frankie Brown	8 October 1987 (aged 31)	(The Football Association) Bristol City
18	FW	Claire Emslie	8 March 1994 (aged 24)	(The Football Association) Manchester City
19	FW	Abi Harrison	7 December 1997 (aged 21)	(The Football Association) Bristol City
20	FW	Fiona Brown	31 March 1995 (aged 23)	(Swedish Football Association) Rosengård
21	GK	Jenna Fife	1 December 1995 (aged 23)	(Scottish Football Association) Hibernian
22	FW	Erin Cuthbert	19 July 1998 (aged 20)	(The Football Association) Chelsea
23	FW	Lizzie Arnot	1 March 1996 (aged 22)	(The Football Association) Manchester United

== Group B ==
=== Netherlands ===
Coach: Sarina Wiegman

The squad was announced on 20 February 2019. Victoria Pelova sustained a shoulder injury during training on 28 February 2019 and was replaced by Siri Worm. On 2 March 2019, Stefanie van der Gragt was replaced by Katja Snoeijs.

No.	Pos.	Player	Date of birth (age)	Club
1	GK	Sari van Veenendaal (captain)	3 April 1990 (aged 28)	(The Football Association) Arsenal
2	DF	Desiree van Lunteren	30 December 1992 (aged 26)	(German Football Association) Freiburg
3	DF	Stefanie van der Gragt (replaced in squad by Katja Snoeijs)	16 August 1992 (aged 26)	(Royal Spanish Football Federation) Barcelona
3	FW	Katja Snoeijs	31 August 1996 (aged 22)	(Royal Dutch Football Association) PSV
4	DF	Aniek Nouwen	9 March 1999 (aged 19)	(Royal Dutch Football Association) PSV
5	DF	Kika van Es	11 October 1991 (aged 27)	(Royal Dutch Football Association) Ajax
6	MF	Inessa Kaagman	17 April 1996 (aged 22)	(The Football Association) Everton
7	FW	Ashleigh Weerden	7 June 1999 (aged 19)	(Royal Dutch Football Association) Twente
8	MF	Sherida Spitse	22 October 1988 (aged 30)	(Norwegian Football Federation) Vålerenga
9	FW	Vivianne Miedema	15 July 1996 (aged 22)	(The Football Association) Arsenal
10	MF	Daniëlle van de Donk	5 August 1991 (aged 27)	(The Football Association) Arsenal
11	FW	Lieke Martens	16 December 1992 (aged 26)	(Royal Spanish Football Federation) Barcelona
12	MF	Jill Roord	22 April 1997 (aged 21)	(German Football Association) Bayern Munich
13	FW	Renate Jansen	7 December 1990 (aged 28)	(Royal Dutch Football Association) Twente
14	MF	Jackie Groenen	17 December 1994 (aged 24)	(German Football Association) Frankfurt
15	FW	Sisca Folkertsma	21 May 1997 (aged 21)	(Royal Dutch Football Association) Twente
16	GK	Loes Geurts	12 January 1986 (aged 33)	(Swedish Football Association) Kopparbergs/Göteborg
17	DF	Merel van Dongen	11 February 1993 (aged 26)	(Royal Spanish Football Federation) Real Betis
18	DF	Danique Kerkdijk	1 May 1996 (aged 22)	(The Football Association) Bristol City
19	FW	Ellen Jansen	6 October 1992 (aged 26)	(Royal Dutch Football Association) Ajax
20	DF	Dominique Bloodworth	17 January 1995 (aged 24)	(The Football Association) Arsenal
21	MF	Lineth Beerensteyn	11 October 1996 (aged 22)	(German Football Association) Bayern Munich
22	MF	Victoria Pelova (injured and replaced by Siri Worm)	3 June 1999 (aged 19)	(Royal Dutch Football Association) ADO Den Haag
22	DF	Siri Worm	20 April 1992 (aged 26)	(The Football Association) Everton
23	GK	Lize Kop	17 March 1998 (aged 20)	(Royal Dutch Football Association) Ajax

=== Poland ===
Coach: Miłosz Stępiński

The squad was announced on 19 February 2019. On 25 February 2019, Anna Rędzia withdrew due to injury and was replaced by Klaudia Olejniczak. On 28 February 2019, Jolanta Siwińska withdrew due to injury and was replaced by Dagmara Grad.

No.	Pos.	Player	Date of birth (age)	Club
1	GK	Katarzyna Kiedrzynek (captain)	19 March 1991 (aged 27)	(French Football Federation) Paris Saint-Germain
2	DF	Martyna Wiankowska	24 December 1996 (aged 22)	(Polish Football Association) Czarni Sosnowiec
3	DF	Gabriela Grzywińska	18 February 1996 (aged 23)	(Polish Football Association) Górnik Łęczna
4	DF	Paulina Dudek	16 June 1997 (aged 21)	(French Football Federation) Paris Saint-Germain
5	DF	Aleksandra Sikora	7 February 1991 (aged 28)	(Italian Football Federation) Juventus
6	DF	Sylwia Matysik	20 May 1997 (aged 21)	(Polish Football Association) Górnik Łęczna
7	DF	Agata Guściora	6 October 1994 (aged 24)	(Polish Football Association) Górnik Łęczna
8	MF	Emilia Zdunek	12 September 1992 (aged 26)	(Polish Football Association) Górnik Łęczna
9	MF	Ewa Pajor	3 December 1996 (aged 22)	(German Football Association) Wolfsburg
10	MF	Weronika Zawistowska	17 December 1999 (aged 19)	(Polish Football Association) Górnik Łęczna
11	MF	Ewelina Kamczyk	22 February 1996 (aged 23)	(Polish Football Association) Górnik Łęczna
12	GK	Anna Szymańska	5 December 1988 (aged 30)	(Polish Football Association) Czarni Sosnowiec
13	MF	Patrycja Balcerzak	1 January 1994 (aged 25)	(Polish Football Association) Górnik Łęczna
14	DF	Dagmara Grad	1 June 1990 (aged 28)	(Polish Football Association) Czarni Sosnowiec
15	FW	Agnieszka Winczo	24 August 1984 (aged 34)	(German Football Association) Cloppenburg
16	MF	Dominika Grabowska	26 December 1998 (aged 20)	(Polish Football Association) Górnik Łęczna
17	MF	Katarzyna Daleszczyk	23 March 1990 (aged 28)	(Italian Football Federation) Sassuolo
18	MF	Natalia Chudzik	8 August 1989 (aged 29)	(Polish Football Association) Medyk Konin
19	FW	Dżesika Jaszek	4 April 1996 (aged 22)	(Polish Football Association) Czarni Sosnowiec
20	FW	Julia Matuschewski	15 January 1997 (aged 22)	(German Football Association) Saarbrücken
21	DF	Klaudia Olejniczak	20 January 1997 (aged 22)	(Polish Football Association) Medyk Konin
22	GK	Kinga Szemik	25 June 1997 (aged 21)	(United States Soccer Federation) Texas–Rio Grande Valley Vaqueros
23	DF	Małgorzata Mesjasz	12 June 1997 (aged 21)	(Polish Football Association) Wałbrzych

=== Spain ===
Coach: Jorge Vilda

The squad was announced on 18 February 2019. On 24 February 2019, Amanda Sampedro and Andrea Falcón withdrew due to injury and were replaced by Olga García and Aitana Bonmatí.

No.	Pos.	Player	Date of birth (age)	Club
1	GK	Lola Gallardo	10 June 1993 (aged 25)	(Royal Spanish Football Federation) Atlético Madrid
2	DF	Celia Jiménez	20 June 1995 (aged 23)	(United States Soccer Federation) Reign FC
3	DF	Leila Ouahabi	22 March 1993 (aged 25)	(Royal Spanish Football Federation) Barcelona
4	DF	Irene Paredes (captain)	4 July 1991 (aged 27)	(French Football Federation) Paris Saint-Germain
5	DF	Ivana Andrés	13 July 1994 (aged 24)	(Royal Spanish Football Federation) Levante
6	MF	Vicky Losada	5 March 1991 (aged 27)	(Royal Spanish Football Federation) Barcelona
7	MF	Marta Corredera	8 August 1991 (aged 27)	(Royal Spanish Football Federation) Levante
8	DF	Marta Torrejón	27 February 1990 (aged 29)	(Royal Spanish Football Federation) Barcelona
9	FW	Mariona Caldentey	19 March 1996 (aged 22)	(Royal Spanish Football Federation) Barcelona
10	FW	Jennifer Hermoso	9 May 1990 (aged 28)	(Royal Spanish Football Federation) Atlético Madrid
11	MF	Alexia Putellas	4 February 1994 (aged 25)	(Royal Spanish Football Federation) Barcelona
12	MF	Marta Carro	6 January 1991 (aged 28)	(Royal Spanish Football Federation) Valencia
13	GK	Sandra Paños	4 November 1992 (aged 26)	(Royal Spanish Football Federation) Barcelona
14	MF	Virginia Torrecilla	4 September 1994 (aged 24)	(French Football Federation) Montpellier
15	MF	Silvia Meseguer	12 March 1989 (aged 29)	(Royal Spanish Football Federation) Atlético Madrid
16	DF	María Pilar León	13 June 1995 (aged 23)	(Royal Spanish Football Federation) Barcelona
17	FW	Lucía García	14 July 1998 (aged 20)	(Royal Spanish Football Federation) Athletic Bilbao
18	FW	Alba Redondo	27 August 1996 (aged 22)	(Royal Spanish Football Federation) Albacete
19	MF	Aitana Bonmatí	18 January 1998 (aged 21)	(Royal Spanish Football Federation) Barcelona
20	DF	Andrea Pereira	19 September 1993 (aged 25)	(Royal Spanish Football Federation) Barcelona
21	FW	Olga García	1 June 1992 (aged 26)	(Royal Spanish Football Federation) Atlético Madrid
22	FW	Nahikari García	10 March 1997 (aged 21)	(Royal Spanish Football Federation) Real Sociedad
23	GK	María Asunción Quiñones	29 October 1996 (aged 22)	(Royal Spanish Football Federation) Real Sociedad

== Group C ==
=== China ===
Coach: Jia Xiuquan

The squad was announced on 26 February 2019.

No.	Pos.	Player	Date of birth (age)	Club
2	MF	Wu Chengshu	26 August 1996 (aged 22)	(Chinese Football Association) Jiangsu Suning
3	MF	Huang Yini	7 January 1993 (aged 26)	(Chinese Football Association) Shanghai Shenhua
4	DF	Lou Jiahui	26 May 1991 (aged 27)	(Chinese Football Association) Henan Jianye
5	DF	Wu Haiyan (captain)	26 February 1993 (aged 26)	(Chinese Football Association) Wuhan Jianghan University
6	DF	Liu Shanshan	16 March 1992 (aged 26)	(Chinese Football Association) Beijing Phoenix
7	FW	Wang Shuang	23 January 1995 (aged 24)	(French Football Federation) Paris Saint-Germain
8	DF	Li Jiayue	8 June 1990 (aged 28)	(Chinese Football Association) Shanghai Shenhua
10	FW	Li Ying	7 January 1993 (aged 26)	(Chinese Football Association) Guangdong Huijun
11	FW	Wang Shanshan	27 January 1990 (aged 29)	(Chinese Football Association) Dalian Quanjian
12	GK	Peng Shimeng	12 May 1998 (aged 20)	(Chinese Football Association) Jiangsu Suning
15	MF	Xiao Yuyi	10 January 1996 (aged 23)	(Chinese Football Association) Shanghai Shenhua
16	FW	Yang Lina	26 February 1993 (aged 26)	(Chinese Football Association) Shanghai Shenhua
17	FW	Gu Yasha	28 November 1990 (aged 28)	(Chinese Football Association) Beijing Phoenix
19	GK	Bi Xiaolin	18 September 1989 (aged 29)	(Chinese Football Association) Dalian Quanjian
20	MF	Zhang Rui	17 January 1989 (aged 30)	(Chinese Football Association) Changchun Zhuoyue
21	MF	Liu Huiting	21 November 1990 (aged 28)	(Chinese Football Association) Changchun Zhuoyue
22	GK	Wang Shimeng	5 December 1990 (aged 28)	(Chinese Football Association) Changchun Zhuoyue
23	MF	Xie Qiwen	27 May 1999 (aged 19)	(Chinese Football Association) Guangdong Huijun
26	DF	Wang Linlin	4 August 2000 (aged 18)	(Chinese Football Association) Shanghai Shenhua
27	MF	Yao Wei	1 September 1997 (aged 21)	(Chinese Football Association) Wuhan Jianghan University
28	MF	Yang Man	2 November 1995 (aged 23)	(Chinese Football Association) Shandong Sports Lottery
36	DF	Lin Yuping	28 February 1992 (aged 26)	(Chinese Football Association) Wuhan Jianghan University
37	MF	Zhao Yujie	28 April 1999 (aged 19)	(United States Soccer Federation) Florida State Seminoles

=== Denmark ===
Coach: Lars Søndergaard

The squad was announced on 12 February 2019. On 19 February 2019, Nanna Christiansen withdrew due to injury and was replaced by Julie Tavlo Petersson. On 24 February 2019, Rikke Sevecke withdrew due to injury and was replaced by Emilie Henriksen. Katrine Veje withdrew due to injury and was replaced by Cecilie Sandvej.

No.	Pos.	Player	Date of birth (age)	Club
1	GK	Line Geltzer Johansen	26 July 1989 (aged 29)	(Norwegian Football Federation) Avaldsnes
2	DF	Line Røddik Hansen	31 January 1988 (aged 31)	(Royal Dutch Football Association) Ajax
3	DF	Janni Arnth	15 October 1986 (aged 32)	(The Football Association) Arsenal
4	MF	Emilie Henriksen	15 March 1997 (aged 21)	(Danish Football Association) Brøndby
5	MF	Emma Snerle	23 March 2001 (aged 17)	(Danish Football Association) Fortuna Hjørring
6	MF	Julie Tavlo Petersson	20 October 1989 (aged 29)	(Danish Football Association) Brøndby
7	MF	Sanne Troelsgaard Nielsen	15 August 1988 (aged 30)	(Swedish Football Association) Rosengård
8	DF	Theresa Nielsen	20 July 1986 (aged 32)	(Football Australia) Melbourne City
9	FW	Nadia Nadim	2 January 1988 (aged 31)	(French Football Federation) Paris Saint-Germain
10	FW	Pernille Harder (captain)	15 November 1992 (aged 26)	(German Football Association) Wolfsburg
11	DF	Cecilie Sandvej	13 June 1990 (aged 28)	(German Football Association) Frankfurt
12	FW	Amalie Thestrup	17 March 1995 (aged 23)	(Danish Football Association) BSF
13	MF	Sofie Junge Pedersen	24 April 1992 (aged 26)	(Italian Football Federation) Juventus
14	FW	Nicoline Sørensen	15 August 1997 (aged 21)	(Danish Football Association) Brøndby
15	MF	Frederikke Thøgersen	27 July 1995 (aged 23)	(Danish Football Association) Fortuna Hjørring
17	MF	Signe Bruun	6 April 1998 (aged 20)	(French Football Federation) Paris Saint-Germain
18	MF	Sara Holmgaard	28 January 1999 (aged 20)	(Danish Football Association) Fortuna Hjørring
19	MF	Sarah Jankovska	13 August 1999 (aged 19)	(Danish Football Association) BSF
20	DF	Stine Ballisager Pedersen	3 January 1994 (aged 25)	(Norwegian Football Federation) Vålerenga
21	MF	Mille Gejl	23 September 1999 (aged 19)	(Danish Football Association) Brøndby
22	GK	Katrine Abel	28 June 1990 (aged 28)	(Danish Football Association) Brøndby
23	MF	Karen Holmgaard	28 January 1999 (aged 20)	(Danish Football Association) Fortuna Hjørring

=== Norway ===
Coach: (Sweden) Martin Sjögren

The squad was announced on 13 February 2019. On 24 February 2019, Kristine Minde withdrew from the squad and was replaced by Heidi Elisabeth Ellingsen.

No.	Pos.	Player	Date of birth (age)	Club
1	GK	Ingrid Hjelmseth	10 April 1980 (aged 38)	(Norwegian Football Federation) Stabæk
2	DF	Ingrid Moe Wold	29 January 1990 (aged 29)	(Norwegian Football Federation) Lillestrøm
5	MF	Synne Skinnes Hansen	12 August 1995 (aged 23)	(Norwegian Football Federation) Lillestrøm
6	DF	Maren Mjelde (captain)	6 November 1989 (aged 29)	(The Football Association) Chelsea
8	MF	Vilde Bøe Risa	13 July 1995 (aged 23)	(Swedish Football Association) Kopparbergs/Göteborg
9	FW	Isabell Herlovsen	23 June 1988 (aged 30)	(Norwegian Football Federation) Kolbotn
10	MF	Caroline Graham Hansen	18 February 1995 (aged 24)	(German Football Association) Wolfsburg
11	FW	Lisa-Marie Karlseng Utland	19 September 1992 (aged 26)	(Swedish Football Association) Rosengård
12	GK	Cecilie Fiskerstrand	20 March 1996 (aged 22)	(Norwegian Football Federation) Lillestrøm
13	MF	Therese Åsland	26 August 1995 (aged 23)	(Norwegian Football Federation) Lillestrøm
14	MF	Ingrid Syrstad Engen	29 April 1998 (aged 20)	(Norwegian Football Federation) Lillestrøm
15	DF	Kristine Bjørdal Leine	6 August 1996 (aged 22)	(Norwegian Football Federation) Røa
16	FW	Guro Reiten	26 July 1994 (aged 24)	(Norwegian Football Federation) Lillestrøm
18	MF	Frida Maanum	16 July 1999 (aged 19)	(Swedish Football Association) Linköping
20	MF	Emilie Haavi	16 June 1992 (aged 26)	(Norwegian Football Federation) Lillestrøm
21	FW	Emilie Nautnes	13 January 1999 (aged 20)	(Norwegian Football Federation) Arna-Bjørnar
23	GK	Aurora Mikalsen	21 March 1996 (aged 22)	(Norwegian Football Federation) Kolbotn
25	DF	Stine Hovland	31 January 1991 (aged 28)	(Norwegian Football Federation) Sandviken
26	DF	Ina Gausdal	21 March 1991 (aged 27)	(Norwegian Football Federation) Lillestrøm
28	DF	Cecilie Redisch Kvamme	11 September 1995 (aged 23)	(Norwegian Football Federation) Sandviken
29	FW	Amalie Eikeland	26 August 1995 (aged 23)	(Norwegian Football Federation) Sandviken
32	MF	Karina Sævik	24 March 1996 (aged 22)	(Norwegian Football Federation) Kolbotn
33	MF	Heidi Elisabeth Ellingsen	28 July 1998 (aged 20)	(Norwegian Football Federation) Lillestrøm

== Group D ==
=== Portugal ===
Coach: Francisco Neto

The squad was announced on 21 February 2019. On 4 March 2019, Carolina Mendes withdrew and was replaced by Laura Luís.

No.	Pos.	Player	Date of birth (age)	Club
1	GK	Inês Pereira	26 May 1999 (aged 19)	(Portuguese Football Federation) Sporting CP
2	DF	Mónica Mendes	16 June 1993 (aged 25)	(Italian Football Federation) Milan
3	MF	Diana Gomes	26 July 1998 (aged 20)	(Portuguese Football Federation) Braga
4	MF	Sílvia Rebelo	20 May 1989 (aged 29)	(Portuguese Football Federation) Benfica
5	DF	Matilde Fidalgo	15 May 1994 (aged 24)	(Portuguese Football Federation) Braga
6	FW	Andreia Norton	15 August 1996 (aged 22)	(German Football Association) SC Sand
7	MF	Cláudia Neto (captain)	18 April 1988 (aged 30)	(German Football Association) Wolfsburg
8	FW	Joana Martins	4 October 2000 (aged 18)	(Portuguese Football Federation) Sporting CP
9	DF	Bruna Costa	10 April 1999 (aged 19)	(Portuguese Football Federation) Sporting CP
10	FW	Oliveira Leite	23 October 1991 (aged 27)	(German Football Association) Bayer Leverkusen
11	MF	Tatiana Pinto	28 March 1994 (aged 24)	(Portuguese Football Federation) Sporting CP
12	GK	Patrícia Morais	17 June 1992 (aged 26)	(Portuguese Football Federation) Sporting CP
13	MF	Cláudia Lima	5 September 1996 (aged 22)	(Portuguese Football Federation) Valadares Gaia
14	MF	Dolores Silva	7 August 1991 (aged 27)	(Royal Spanish Football Federation) Atlético Madrid
15	DF	Carole Costa	3 May 1990 (aged 28)	(Portuguese Football Federation) Sporting CP
16	FW	Diana Silva	4 June 1995 (aged 23)	(Portuguese Football Federation) Sporting CP
17	MF	Vanessa Marques	12 April 1996 (aged 22)	(Portuguese Football Federation) Braga
18	FW	Carolina Mendes (replaced in squad by Laura Luís)	27 November 1987 (aged 31)	(Portuguese Football Federation) Sporting CP
18	FW	Laura Luís	15 August 1992 (aged 26)	(Portuguese Football Federation) Braga
19	FW	Ana Capeta	22 December 1997 (aged 21)	(Portuguese Football Federation) Sporting CP
20	FW	Jéssica Silva	11 December 1994 (aged 24)	(Royal Spanish Football Federation) Levante
21	MF	Rafaela Lopes	20 October 1999 (aged 19)	(French Football Federation) Saint-Maur
22	GK	Rute Costa	1 June 1994 (aged 24)	(Portuguese Football Federation) Braga
23	DF	Ágata Pimenta	17 May 1995 (aged 23)	(Portuguese Football Federation) Braga

=== Sweden ===
Coach: Peter Gerhardsson

The squad was announced on 11 February 2019.

No.	Pos.	Player	Date of birth (age)	Club
1	GK	Hedvig Lindahl	29 April 1983 (aged 35)	(The Football Association) Chelsea
2	MF	Jonna Andersson	2 January 1993 (aged 26)	(The Football Association) Chelsea
3	DF	Linda Sembrant	15 May 1987 (aged 31)	(French Football Federation) Montpellier
4	DF	Hanna Glas	16 April 1993 (aged 25)	(French Football Federation) Paris Saint-Germain
5	MF	Nilla Fischer	2 August 1984 (aged 34)	(German Football Association) Wolfsburg
6	DF	Magdalena Eriksson	8 September 1993 (aged 25)	(The Football Association) Chelsea
7	MF	Sandra Adolfsson	13 June 1987 (aged 31)	(Swedish Football Association) Vittsjö
8	FW	Lina Hurtig	5 September 1995 (aged 23)	(Swedish Football Association) Linköping
9	FW	Kosovare Asllani	29 July 1989 (aged 29)	(Swedish Football Association) Linköping
10	FW	Sofia Jakobsson	23 April 1990 (aged 28)	(French Football Federation) Montpellier
11	FW	Stina Blackstenius	5 February 1996 (aged 23)	(French Football Federation) Montpellier
12	GK	Cajsa Andersson	19 January 1993 (aged 26)	(Swedish Football Association) Piteå
13	DF	Amanda Ilestedt	17 January 1993 (aged 26)	(German Football Association) Turbine Potsdam
14	MF	Hanna Folkesson	15 June 1988 (aged 30)	(Swedish Football Association) Djurgården
15	DF	Nathalie Björn	4 May 1997 (aged 21)	(Swedish Football Association) Rosengård
16	DF	Mia Carlsson	12 March 1990 (aged 28)	(Swedish Football Association) Kristianstads
17	MF	Caroline Seger (captain)	19 March 1985 (aged 33)	(Swedish Football Association) Rosengård
18	FW	Madelen Janogy	12 November 1995 (aged 23)	(Swedish Football Association) Piteå
19	FW	Anna Anvegård	10 May 1997 (aged 21)	(Swedish Football Association) Växjö
20	FW	Mimmi Larsson	9 April 1994 (aged 24)	(Swedish Football Association) Linköping
21	GK	Zećira Mušović	26 May 1996 (aged 22)	(Swedish Football Association) Rosengård
22	FW	Olivia Schough	11 March 1991 (aged 27)	(Swedish Football Association) Djurgården
23	MF	Elin Rubensson	11 May 1993 (aged 25)	(Swedish Football Association) Kopparbergs/Göteborg
24	FW	Julia Zigiotti Olme	24 December 1997 (aged 21)	(Swedish Football Association) Kopparbergs/Göteborg

=== Switzerland ===
Coach: (Denmark) Nils Nielsen

The squad was announced on 9 February 2019. On 22 February 2019, Viola Calligaris, Seraina Friedli, and Julia Stierli withdrew due to injuries and were replaced by Carola Fasel and Lesley Ramseier.

No.	Pos.	Player	Date of birth (age)	Club
1	GK	Gaëlle Thalmann	18 January 1986 (aged 33)	(Italian Football Federation) Sassuolo
2	DF	Francesca Calò	25 May 1995 (aged 23)	(German Football Association) Werder Bremen
3	DF	Naomi Mégroz	6 August 1998 (aged 20)	(Swiss Football Association) Zürich
4	DF	Rachel Rinast	2 June 1991 (aged 27)	(Israel Football Association) ASA Tel Aviv University
5	DF	Noelle Maritz	23 December 1995 (aged 23)	(German Football Association) Wolfsburg
6	FW	Géraldine Reuteler	21 April 1999 (aged 19)	(German Football Association) Frankfurt
7	MF	Marilena Widmer	7 August 1997 (aged 21)	(German Football Association) Frankfurt
8	DF	Jana Brunner	20 January 1997 (aged 22)	(Swiss Football Association) Basel
9	FW	Ana-Maria Crnogorčević	3 October 1990 (aged 28)	(United States Soccer Federation) Portland Thorns
10	FW	Ramona Bachmann	25 December 1990 (aged 28)	(The Football Association) Chelsea
11	MF	Coumba Sow	27 August 1994 (aged 24)	(Swiss Football Association) Zürich
12	GK	Nadja Furrer	30 April 1998 (aged 20)	(Swiss Football Association) Grasshoppers
13	MF	Sandrine Mauron	19 December 1996 (aged 22)	(Swiss Football Association) Zürich
14	DF	Rahel Kiwic	5 January 1991 (aged 28)	(German Football Association) Turbine Potsdam
15	MF	Lesley Ramseier	5 June 1997 (aged 21)	(Swiss Football Association) Zürich
16	DF	Luana Bühler	28 April 1996 (aged 22)	(German Football Association) Hoffenheim
17	MF	Florijana Ismaili	1 January 1995 (aged 24)	(Swiss Football Association) Young Boys
18	DF	Carola Fasel	27 June 1997 (aged 21)	(Swiss Football Association) Young Boys
19	FW	Eseosa Aigbogun	23 May 1993 (aged 25)	(French Football Federation) Paris FC
20	FW	Camille Surdez	13 January 1998 (aged 21)	(French Football Federation) Bordeaux
22	MF	Vanessa Bernauer	23 March 1988 (aged 30)	(Italian Football Federation) Roma
23	FW	Alisha Lehmann	21 January 1999 (aged 20)	(The Football Association) West Ham United
24	FW	Melanie Müller	31 May 1996 (aged 22)	(Swiss Football Association) Luzern
25	DF	Irina Brütsch	24 July 1995 (aged 23)	(Swiss Football Association) Luzern
26	DF	Thaïs Hurni	22 July 1998 (aged 20)	(Swiss Football Association) Young Boys

== Player representation ==
=== By club ===
Clubs with 5 or more players represented are listed.

Players	Club
11	(Spain) Barcelona
9	(Norway) Lillestrøm, (Portugal) Sporting CP
8	(France) Paris Saint-Germain, (Poland) Górnik Łęczna
7	(Germany) Wolfsburg, (Sweden) Rosengård
6	(England) Arsenal, (England) Chelsea
5	(China) Shanghai Shenhua, (Denmark) Brøndby, (Iceland) Breiðablik, (Portugal) Braga, (Scotland) Glasgow City, (Spain) Atlético Madrid

=== By club nationality ===
Players	Clubs
31	Sweden
29	England
25	Spain
22	Germany
21	China, Norway
18	United States
17	France
16	Portugal
15	Poland
11	Denmark, Iceland, Netherlands, Switzerland
7	Scotland
6	Italy
3	Australia
1	Canada, Israel

=== By club federation ===
Players	Federation
234	UEFA
24	AFC
19	CONCACAF

=== By representatives of domestic league ===
National squad	Players
China	21
Spain	20
Norway	18
Portugal	16
Poland	15
Sweden	15
Denmark	11
Iceland	11
Switzerland	11
Netherlands	8
Scotland	7
Canada	1
