= 2024–25 Tottenham Hotspur F.C. Women season =

Tottenham Hotspur
2024–25 season
- Head coach: Robert Vilahamn
- Stadium: Brisbane Road, Leyton
- WSL: 11th
- FA Cup: Fourth round
- League Cup: Quarter-final
- Top goalscorer: League: Bethany England (8); All: Bethany England (8)
- Highest home attendance: 28,852 (vs. Arsenal, 16 November)
- Lowest home attendance: 918 (vs. Everton, 8 December)
- Average home league attendance: 4,877
- Biggest win: 4–0 v Crystal Palace (H) (WSL, 21 September 2024)
- Biggest defeat: 0–5 v Arsenal (A) (WSL, 16 February 2025)
Home colours	Away colours	Third colours

The 2024–25 season was Tottenham Hotspur's sixth season in the top flight of the English football league system and 40th season in existence. Along with competing in the WSL, the club also contested two domestic cup competitions: the FA Cup and the League Cup.

At the end of the season, Robert Vilahamn was sacked as head coach on 8 June 2025 after two seasons in charge.

== Squad ==
As of 1 March 2025

Note: Flags indicate national team as defined under FIFA eligibility rules; some limited exceptions apply. Players may hold more than one non-FIFA nationality.

No.	Pos.	Nation	Player
1	GK	NED	Lize Kop
2	DF	AUS	Charli Grant
3	DF	ENG	Ella Morris
4	DF	ENG	Amy James-Turner
5	DF	ENG	Molly Bartrip (vice-captain)
6	DF	SWE	Amanda Nildén
7	FW	ENG	Jessica Naz
8	FW	AUS	Hayley Raso
9	FW	ENG	Bethany England (captain)
10	MF	ESP	Maite Oroz
11	MF	DEN	Olivia Holdt
12	DF	SWE	Josefine Rybrink
13	MF	SWE	Matilda Vinberg

No.	Pos.	Nation	Player
14	MF	HUN	Anna Csiki
15	DF	AUS	Clare Hunt
16	FW	ENG	Kit Graham
17	FW	SCO	Martha Thomas
20	MF	FIN	Olga Ahtinen (vice-captain)
21	DF	SUI	Luana Bühler
23	FW	MAR	Rosella Ayane
24	MF	JAM	Drew Spence
25	MF	FIN	Eveliina Summanen
27	GK	ENG	Eleanor Heeps
29	DF	ENG	Ashleigh Neville
31	FW	ENG	Lenna Gunning-Williams
44	DF	ENG	Zara Bailey

== Transfers ==
=== Transfers in ===
Date	Position	Nationality	Name	From	Ref.
26 June 2024	DF	(Sweden)	Amanda Nildén	(Italy) Juventus	
16 July 2024	DF	(England)	Ella Morris	(England) Southampton	
16 August 2024	DF	(Australia)	Clare Hunt	(France) Paris Saint-Germain	
1 September 2024	FW	(Australia)	Hayley Raso	(Spain) Real Madrid	
6 September 2024	MF	(Hungary)	Anna Csiki	(Sweden) BK Häcken	
13 September 2024	MF	(Spain)	Maite Oroz	(Spain) Real Madrid	
3 January 2025	MF	(Denmark)	Olivia Holdt	(Sweden) FC Rosengård	
15 January 2025	GK	(Netherlands)	Lize Kop	(England) Leicester City	
27 January 2025	DF	(Sweden)	Josefine Rybrink	(Sweden) BK Häcken	

=== Loans in ===
Date	Position	Nationality	Name	From	Until	Ref.
7 September 2024	GK	(United States)	Katelin Talbert	(England) West Ham United	31 December 2024	

=== Transfers out ===
Date	Position	Nationality	Name	To	Ref.
7 June 2024	DF	(England)	Asmita Ale	(England) Leicester City	
7 June 2024	FW	(England)	Ellie Brazil	(England) Charlton Athletic	
7 June 2024	FW	(Poland)	Nikola Karczewska	(Italy) AC Milan	
7 June 2024	DF	(England)	Gracie Pearse	(England) Charlton Athletic	
7 June 2024	MF	(New Zealand)	Ria Percival		
7 June 2024	MF	(Germany)	Ramona Petzelberger	(Italy) Como	
7 June 2024	DF	(Canada)	Shelina Zadorsky	(England) West Ham United	
28 June 2024	MF	(England)	Gracie Hickman	(England) Billericay Town	
1 July 2024	MF	(England)	Bethany Hartigan	(United States) IU Indy Jaguars	
1 July 2024	DF	(Nicaragua)	Stella Villalta	(United States) Santa Clara Broncos	
1 July 2024	DF	(England)	Evie Underhill	(United States) St. Bonaventure Bonnies	
7 August 2024	FW	(England)	Ella Houghton	(England) Billericay Town	
15 August 2024	GK	(Czech Republic)	Barbora Votíková	(Czech Republic) Slavia Prague	
16 August 2024	DF	(England)	Ellie Bishop	(England) Watford	
4 September 2024	FW	(Norway)	Celin Bizet	(England) Manchester United	
28 September 2024	MF	(Australia)	Milly Boughton	(England) Arsenal	
31 January 2025	MF	(China)	Wang Shuang	(China) Wuhan Chegu Jiangda	

=== Loans out ===
Date	Position	Nationality	Name	To	Until	Ref.
23 August 2024	MF	(England)	Elkie Bowyer (Note: Dual registration)	(England) Watford	14 January 2025	
23 August 2024	FW	(England)	Maia Lazarro	(England) Watford	End of season	
31 August 2024	FW	(Morocco)	Rosella Ayane	(United States) Chicago Red Stars	31 December 2024	
10 January 2025	FW	(England)	Araya Dennis	(England) Southampton	End of season	
24 January 2025	MF	(England)	Elkie Bowyer	(England) Ipswich Town	End of season	
1 March 2025	GK	(Jamaica)	Becky Spencer (Note: Emergency goalkeeper loan)	(England) Chelsea	End of season	

== Preseason ==
Tottenham confirmed four friendlies, all played behind closed doors, as part of their preseason schedule as well as a further two "undisclosed" friendlies.

17 August 2024 Friendly	Tottenham Hotspur	6–1	London City Lionesses	Enfield
	Wang; Naz; Thomas; Gunning-Williams; Ahtinen	Report	Shen	Stadium: Hotspur Way Training Ground; Attendance: Behind-closed-doors

22 August 2024 Friendly	Southampton	1–2	Tottenham Hotspur	Bisham
	Rowe 23'	Report	Thomas 28'; Summanen 89' (pen.)	Stadium: Bisham Abbey; Attendance: Behind-closed-doors

11 September 2024 Friendly	Tottenham Hotspur	2–0	(Netherlands) Feyenoord	Enfield
	Gunning-Williams; Ahtinen	Report		Stadium: Hotspur Way Training Ground; Attendance: Behind-closed-doors

15 September 2024 Friendly	Tottenham Hotspur	1–0	Manchester United	Burton upon Trent
	Thomas	Report		Stadium: St George's Park; Attendance: Behind-closed-doors

== Women's Super League ==
=== Results summary ===
Overall								Home						Away					
Pld	W	D	L	GF	GA	GD	Pts	W	D	L	GF	GA	GD	W	D	L	GF	GA	GD
22	5	5	12	26	44	−18	20	4	0	7	14	16	−2	1	5	5	12	28	−16

Last updated: 10 May 2025.
Source: WSL

=== Results by matchday ===
Round	1	2	3	4	5	6	7	8	9	10	11	12	13	14	15	16	17	18	19	20	21	22
Ground	H	A	H	A	A	H	A	H	H	A	H	A	H	A	H	H	A	A	H	A	H	A
Result	W	D	L	L	L	W	L	L	W	D	W	W	L	L	L	L	L	D	L	D	L	D
Position	2	3	7	7	8	7	7	7	6	6	6	6	6	6	7	7	9	9	9	10	10	11

A = Away; H = Home; W = Win; D = Draw; L = Loss

=== Results ===
22 September 2024 1	Tottenham Hotspur	4–0	Crystal Palace	Leyton
14:00	Raso 19'; Naz 53'; Spence 76'; Ahtinen 88'	Report	Gejl (yellow card) 46'; Gibbons (yellow card) 61'; Blanchard (yellow card) 62'; Everett (yellow card) 74'; Aspin (yellow card) 90+4' (yellow-red card) 90+4'	Stadium: Brisbane Road; Attendance: 1,778; Referee: Amy Fearn

29 September 2024 2	Aston Villa	2–2	Tottenham Hotspur	Aston
16:30	Leon 78'; Daly 88'	Report	Summanen 23' (pen.), (yellow card) 75'; England 90+6'	Stadium: Villa Park; Attendance: 2,912; Referee: Lauren Impey

6 October 2024 3	Tottenham Hotspur	2–3	Liverpool	Leyton
14:15	Hinds 54' (o.g.); Hunt (yellow card) 73', (goal) 83'; Thomas (yellow card) 77'	Report	Kapocs 10'; Bonner (yellow card) 70'; Höbinger 75', 90+5' (pen.); Clark (yellow card) 86'	Stadium: Brisbane Road; Attendance: 2,206; Referee: Kirsty Dowle

13 October 2024 4	Manchester United	3–0	Tottenham Hotspur	Leigh
12:30	Terland 44', 45+4'; Le Tissier 59' (pen.); Toone (yellow card) 64'	Report		Stadium: Leigh Sports Village; Attendance: 4,473; Referee: Lisa Benn

20 October 2024 5	Chelsea	5–2	Tottenham Hotspur	Kingston upon Thames
18:45	Hamano 10'; Baltimore (yellow card) 18', (goal) 74'; Hampton (yellow card) 21'; Nildén 44' (o.g.); Rytting Kaneryd 70', 90+1'; Buchanan (yellow card) 83'	Report	Nildén 21'; Hunt (yellow card) 29'; Spence (yellow card) 76'; Summanen 84'	Stadium: Kingsmeadow; Attendance: 4,152; Referee: Emily Heaslip

3 November 2024 6	Tottenham Hotspur	2–1	West Ham United	Leyton
14:00	Neville (yellow card) 38'; Summanen (yellow card) 41'; England 51'; Hunt (yellow card) 73'; Sáez 90+2' (o.g.)	Report	Ueki 37', (yellow card) 40'; Asseyi (yellow card) 84'	Stadium: Brisbane Road; Attendance: 1,614; Referee: Melissa Burgin

8 November 2024 7	Manchester City	4–0	Tottenham Hotspur	Manchester
19:30	Shaw 1', 15', 67'; Roord 66'	Report	James-Turner (yellow card) 77'	Stadium: City of Manchester Stadium; Attendance: 10,319; Referee: Stacey Pearson

16 November 2024 8	Tottenham Hotspur	0–3	Arsenal	Tottenham
13:45	Spence (yellow card) 23'; Hunt (yellow card) 52'; Summanen (yellow card) 84'; Gunning-Williams (yellow card) 90+3'	Report	Russo 2'; Maanum 22'; Blackstenius 66'; McCabe (yellow card) 73'; Cooney-Cross (yellow card) 78'; Catley (yellow card) 90'	Stadium: Tottenham Hotspur Stadium; Attendance: 28,852; Referee: Emily Heaslip

8 December 2024 9	Tottenham Hotspur	2–1	Everton	Leyton
13:00	England 25' (pen.), 48' (pen.); Naz (yellow card) 45+1'	Report	S. Holmgaard 40', (yellow card) 75'	Stadium: Brisbane Road; Attendance: 918; Referee: Amy Fearn

14 December 2024 10	Brighton & Hove Albion	1–1	Tottenham Hotspur	Crawley
17:30	Carabalí (yellow card) 46'; Olislagers 82'	Report	Neville (yellow card) 44'; Nildén (yellow card) 68'; England 75'	Stadium: Broadfield Stadium; Attendance: 2,083; Referee: Lisa Benn

19 January 2025 11	Tottenham Hotspur	1–0	Leicester City	Leyton
12:30	Leitzig 4' (o.g.)	Report	Bott (yellow card) 43'; Thibaud (yellow card) 70'; Mace (yellow card) 73'	Stadium: Brisbane Road; Attendance: 1,314; Referee: Stacey Pearson

26 January 2025 12	Crystal Palace	2–3	Tottenham Hotspur	Sutton
14:00	Stengel 48'; Weerden 64'; Woodham (yellow card) 87'; Everett (yellow card) 90+3'	Report	England 14', 23'; Raso (yellow card) 17'; Holdt 90+5'	Stadium: Gander Green Lane; Attendance: 732; Referee: Lucy May

2 February 2025 13	Tottenham Hotspur	0–1	Manchester United	Tottenham
18:45	Raso (yellow card) 24'	Report	Terland 6'	Stadium: Tottenham Hotspur Stadium; Attendance: 6,923; Referee: Kirsty Dowle

16 February 2025 14	Arsenal	5–0	Tottenham Hotspur	Holloway
12:30	Hunt 15' (o.g.); Caldentey 35'; Maanum 51'; Russo 58'; Fox 90'	Report	Csiki (yellow card) 37'; Hunt (yellow card) 47'; Nildén (yellow card) 51'	Stadium: Emirates Stadium; Attendance: 56,784; Referee: Stacey Fullicks

2 March 2025 15	Tottenham Hotspur	1–2	Manchester City	Leyton
14:00	England 32'; Spence (yellow card) 45+3'	Report	Miedema 11'; Fujino 78'	Stadium: Brisbane Road; Attendance: 2,119; Referee: Amy Fearn

16 March 2025 16	Tottenham Hotspur	0–1	Brighton & Hove Albion	Leyton
15:00	Summanen (yellow card) 52'; Raso (yellow card) 79'	Report	Kirby 42'; Thorisdottir (yellow card) 45+5'; Noordam (yellow card) 69'; Parris (yellow card) 83'; Agyemang (yellow card) 85'	Stadium: Brisbane Road; Attendance: 1,425; Referee: Ryan Atkin

23 March 2025 17	West Ham United	2–0	Tottenham Hotspur	Dagenham
12:00	Rybrink 16' (o.g.); Paví (yellow card) 26'; Asseyi 90'	Report	Spence (yellow card) 66'	Stadium: Victoria Road; Attendance: 1,859; Referee: Stacey Pearson

30 March 2025 18	Leicester City	1–1	Tottenham Hotspur	Leicester
14:00	Bott (yellow card) 39'; Rybrink 55' (o.g.)	Report	Spence 62'	Stadium: King Power Stadium; Attendance: 2,527; Referee: Grace Lowe

20 April 2025 19	Tottenham Hotspur	2–3	Aston Villa	Leyton
14:00	Naz 65'; Summanen (yellow card) 66'; Morris 70'; Spence (yellow card) 90+6'	Report	Patten 30'; Parker (yellow card) 38'; Salmon 56'; Pacheco (yellow card) 60'; Staniforth (yellow card) 82'; Hanson 90+1'	Stadium: Brisbane Road; Attendance: 1,624; Referee: Stacey Fullicks

27 April 2025 20	Liverpool	2–2	Tottenham Hotspur	St Helens
12:00	Haug 12', 51'; Hinds (yellow card) 77'	Report	Laws 25' (o.g.); Hunt 31'; Rybrink (yellow card) 88'	Stadium: Totally Wicked Stadium; Attendance: 3,213; Referee: Phoebe Cross

4 May 2025 21	Tottenham Hotspur	0–1	Chelsea	Tottenham
14:15	Hunt (yellow card) 48'	Report	Macario 35' (pen.); Kaptein (yellow card) 60'; Nüsken (yellow card) 70'	Stadium: Tottenham Hotspur Stadium; Attendance: 9,999; Referee: Melissa Burgin

10 May 2025 22	Everton	1–1	Tottenham Hotspur	Walton
12:30	Sarri 11'; Hobson (yellow card) 72'	Report	Morris (yellow card) 10'; Spence 30'; Hunt (yellow card) 51'; Nildén (yellow card) 59'; Neville (yellow card) 69'; Ahtinen (yellow card) 89'; Thomas (yellow card) 90+3'	Stadium: Walton Hall Park; Referee: Stacey Fullicks

=== League table ===
Pos	Team	Pld	W	D	L	GF	GA	GD	Pts	Qualification or relegation
8	Everton	22	6	6	10	24	32	−8	24	
9	West Ham United	22	6	5	11	36	41	−5	23	
10	Leicester City	22	5	5	12	21	37	−16	20	
11	Tottenham Hotspur	22	5	5	12	26	44	−18	20	
12	Crystal Palace (R)	22	2	4	16	20	65	−45	10	Relegation to the WSL2

Source: The Football Association
Rules for classification: 1) Points; 2) Goal difference; 3) Number of goals scored.
(R) Relegated

== Women's FA Cup ==
As a member of the first tier, Tottenham entered the FA Cup in the fourth round proper.

29 January 2025 Fourth round	Everton	2–0	Tottenham Hotspur	Walton
19:00	Ladd (yellow card) 45+4'; S. Holmgaard (yellow card) 45+6'; Gago 48'; Payne 90+2'	Report		Stadium: Walton Hall Park; Referee: Cheryl Foster
Note: Rescheduled from 12 January due to frozen pitch.

== Women's League Cup ==
=== Group stage ===
2 October 2024 Group stage	Charlton Athletic	1–2	Tottenham Hotspur	Charlton
19:15	Bradley (yellow card) 16', (goal) 45'; Primus (yellow card) 45+3'; Ademiluyi (yellow card) 75'; Hutton (yellow card) 87'	Report	Bühler 8'; Grant (yellow card) 69'; Naz 86'	Stadium: The Valley; Attendance: 664; Referee: Lisa Benn

23 November 2024 Group stage	Tottenham Hotspur	1–0	Aston Villa	Leyton
12:15	Nildén (yellow card) 54'; Summanen 60'	Report		Stadium: Brisbane Road; Attendance: 820; Referee: Stacey Fullicks

11 December 2024 Group stage	Crystal Palace	0–2	Tottenham Hotspur	Sutton
19:00	Atkinson (yellow card) 26'; Weerden (yellow card) 87'	Report	Vinberg 50'; Dennis 71'; Neville (yellow card) 88'	Stadium: Gander Green Lane; Attendance: 257; Referee: Emily Heaslip

Pos	Team	Pld	W	WPEN	LPEN	L	GF	GA	GD	Pts	Qualification	TOT	AST	CRY	CHA
1	Tottenham Hotspur	3	3	0	0	0	5	1	+4	9	Advanced to knock-out stage	—	1–0	–	–
2	Aston Villa	3	2	0	0	1	6	2	+4	6		–	—	2–0	4–1
3	Crystal Palace	3	1	0	0	2	2	4	−2	3		0–2	–	—	2–0
4	Charlton Athletic	3	0	0	0	3	2	8	−6	0		1–2	–	–	—

Updated to match(es) played on 23 November 2024. Source: Women's League Cup
Rules for classification: 1) Points; 2) Goal difference; 3) Number of goals scored; 4) Number of wins; 5) Head-to-head record

=== Knockout stage ===
22 January 2025 Quarter-final	Tottenham Hotspur	1–2	West Ham United	Leyton
19:30	Thomas 10'	Report	Piubel 39'; Smith 44'; Asseyi (yellow card) 72'	Stadium: Brisbane Road; Attendance: 992; Referee: Ryan Atkin

== Squad statistics ==
=== Appearances ===
As of match played 10 May 2025

Starting appearances are listed first, followed by substitute appearances after the + symbol where applicable.

No.	Pos	Nat	Player	Total		WSL		FA Cup		League Cup	
No.	Pos	Nat	Player	Apps	Goals	Apps	Goals	Apps	Goals	Apps	Goals
1	GK	(Netherlands) NED	Lize Kop	12	0	12	0	0	0	0	0
2	DF	(Australia) AUS	Charli Grant	14	0	4+6	0	1	0	2+1	0
3	DF	(England) ENG	Ella Morris	13	1	10+2	1	0	0	1	0
4	DF	(England) ENG	Amy James-Turner	2	0	0+1	0	0	0	1	0
5	DF	(England) ENG	Molly Bartrip	27	0	22	0	0+1	0	4	0
6	DF	(Sweden) SWE	Amanda Nildén	19	1	15+1	1	1	0	2	0
7	FW	(England) ENG	Jessica Naz	26	3	18+4	2	1	0	2+1	1
8	FW	(Australia) AUS	Hayley Raso	16	1	10+3	1	1	0	2	0
9	FW	(England) ENG	Bethany England	23	8	15+4	8	0	0	3+1	0
10	MF	(Spain) ESP	Maite Oroz	19	0	13+3	0	0	0	3	0
11	MF	(Denmark) DEN	Olivia Holdt	12	1	7+4	1	0+1	0	0	0
12	DF	(Sweden) SWE	Josefine Rybrink	6	0	5+1	0	0	0	0	0
13	MF	(Sweden) SWE	Matilda Vinberg	23	1	8+10	0	1	0	2+2	1
14	MF	(Hungary) HUN	Anna Csiki	13	0	2+6	0	1	0	3+1	0
15	DF	(Australia) AUS	Clare Hunt	21	2	16+1	2	1	0	1+2	0
16	FW	(England) ENG	Kit Graham	0	0	0	0	0	0	0	0
17	FW	(Scotland) SCO	Martha Thomas	26	1	13+9	0	1	0	3	1
20	MF	(Finland) FIN	Olga Ahtinen	16	1	3+9	1	1	0	2+1	0
21	DF	(Switzerland) SUI	Luana Bühler	9	1	5+1	0	1	0	2	1
23	FW	(Morocco) MAR	Rosella Ayane	5	0	0+4	0	0+1	0	0	0
24	MF	(Jamaica) JAM	Drew Spence	21	3	18+1	3	0	0	1+1	0
25	MF	(Finland) FIN	Eveliina Summanen	19	3	17	2	0	0	1+1	1
27	GK	(England) ENG	Eleanor Heeps	6	0	2	0	1	0	3	0
29	DF	(England) ENG	Ashleigh Neville	26	0	19+2	0	0+1	0	3+1	0
31	FW	(England) ENG	Lenna Gunning-Williams	16	0	0+12	0	0+1	0	2+1	0
44	DF	(England) ENG	Zara Bailey	1	0	0	0	0	0	0+1	0
Players away from the club on loan:
22	GK	(Jamaica) JAM	Rebecca Spencer	8	0	8	0	0	0	0	0
30	FW	(England) ENG	Araya Dennis	2	1	0	0	0	0	0+2	1
Players who left the club during the season:
26	GK	(United States) USA	Katelin Talbert	1	0	0	0	0	0	1	0
77	MF	(China) CHN	Wang Shuang	1	0	0	0	0	0	0+1	0
