= Sandra Silva =

Portuguese footballer

Personal information
- Full name: Sandra Cristina Castro Silva
- Date of birth: 17 January 1975 (age 51)
- Position: Midfielder

Senior career*
Years	Team	Apps	(Gls)
- Boavista

International career^{‡}
1995–2006	Portugal	83	(1)
- * Club domestic league appearances and goals ‡ National team caps and goals as of 11 May 2006

Sandra Cristina Castro Silva (born 17 January 1975) is a Portuguese former footballer who played as a midfielder. She has been a member of the Portugal women's national team.

== International goals ==
Scores and results list Portugal's goal tally first

No.	Date	Venue	Opponent	Score	Result	Competition	Ref.
1	21 January 2002	Estádio Municipal, Rio Maior, Portugal	Greece	2–0	3–0	2002 International Tournament of Vale do Tejo	
