= Josefine Rybrink =

Swedish footballer

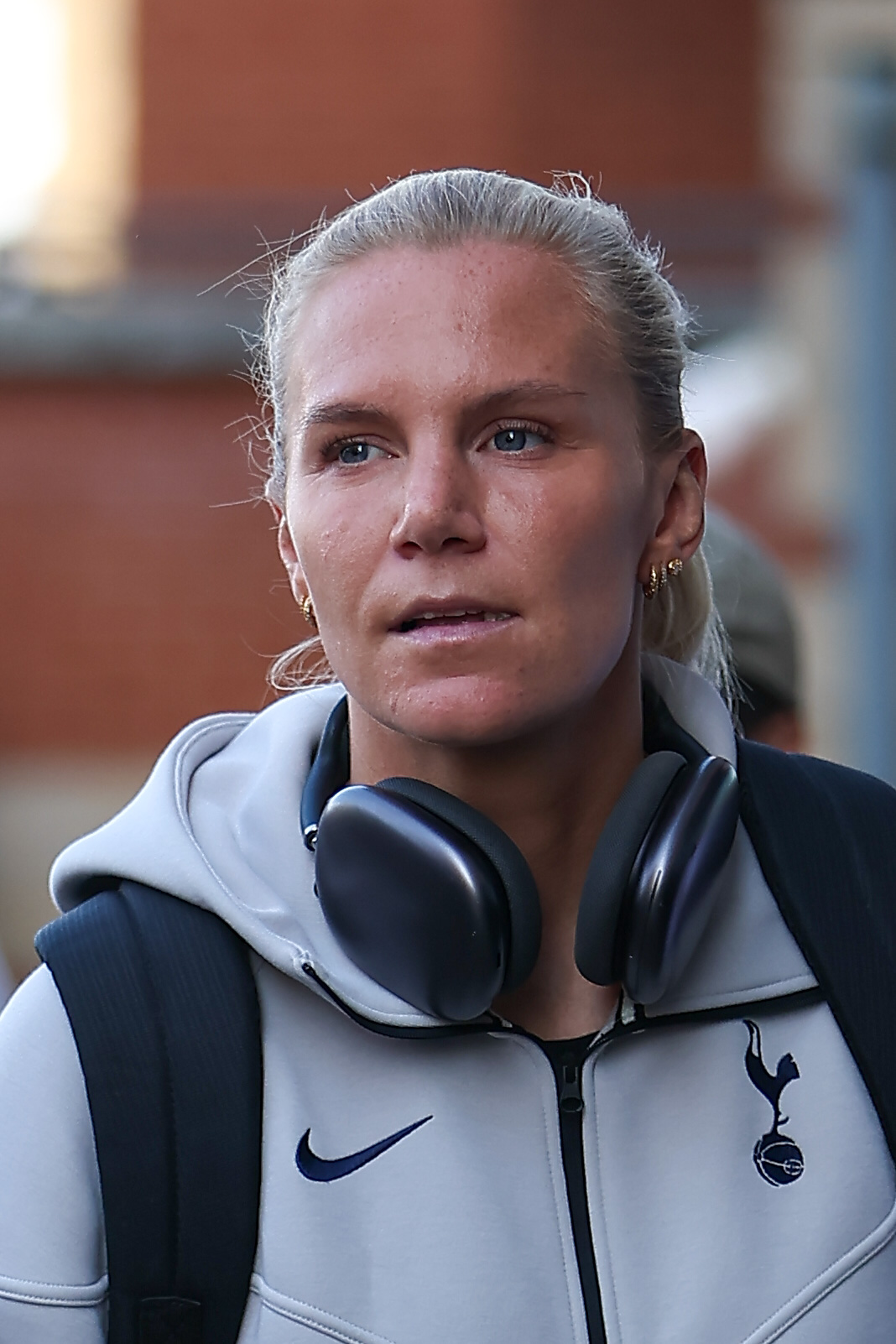
- Rybrink in 2025

Personal information
- Full name: Solveig Josefine Kristina Rybrink
- Date of birth: 19 January 1998 (age 28)
- Place of birth: Kristianstad, Sweden
- Height: 1.68 m (5 ft 6 in)
- Position: Defender

Team information
- Current team: BK Häcken

Youth career
- Onsala BK

Senior career*
Years	Team	Apps	(Gls)
2015–2017	Kungsbacka	66	(2)
2018–2021	Kristianstads	74	(0)
2022–2024	BK Häcken	73	(3)
2025–2026	Tottenham Hotspur	15	(0)
2026–	BK Häcken	0	(0)

International career^{‡}
2014–2015	Sweden U17	5	(0)
2015–2017	Sweden U19	7	(0)
2021–	Sweden	8	(1)
- * Club domestic league appearances and goals as of 14:44, 17 May 2026 (UTC) ‡ National team caps and goals as of 02:02, 21 December 2025 (UTC)

Solveig Josefine Kristina Rybrink (born 19 January 1998) is a Swedish professional footballer who plays as a defender for BK Häcken and the Sweden national team.

== Club career ==
Rybrink transferred to Kristianstads on a two-year contract in November 2017, after a successful three-year spell with Kungsbacka.

In November 2021, Rybrink joined BK Häcken on a contract until the end of 2024.

After leaving Häcken at the end of her contract, Rybrink signed a short-term contract with Tottenham Hotspur until the end of the 2024–25 season on 27 January 2025. She spent two seasons in Tottenham before departing from the club as a free agent in the summer of 2026.

On 22 July 2026, Rybrink was announced at BK Häcken.

== International career ==
On 19 February 2021 Rybrink made her senior Sweden debut, in a 6–1 friendly win over Austria in Paola, Malta. She was a 78th-minute substitute for Nilla Fischer.

== Career statistics ==
=== Club ===
As of match played 16 May 2026

Appearances and goals by club, season and competition
Club	Season	League			National cup (Note: Includes Svenska Cupen, Women's FA Cup)		League cup (Note: Includes Women's League Cup)		Continental (Note: Includes UEFA Women's Champions League)		Total	
Club	Season	Division	Apps	Goals	Apps	Goals	Apps	Goals	Apps	Goals	Apps	Goals
Kungsbacka	2015	Elitettan	21	0	1	0	—		—		22	0
Kungsbacka	2016	Elitettan	23	1	3	0	—		—		26	1
Kungsbacka	2017	Elitettan	22	1	1	0	—		—		23	1
Kungsbacka	Total		66	2	5	0	0	0	0	0	71	2
Kristianstads	2017	Damallsvenskan	—		3	0	—		—		3	0
Kristianstads	2018	Damallsvenskan	21	0	6	0	—		—		27	0
Kristianstads	2019	Damallsvenskan	12	0	1	0	—		—		13	0
Kristianstads	2020	Damallsvenskan	20	0	4	0	—		—		24	0
Kristianstads	2021	Damallsvenskan	21	0	1	0	—		2	0	24	0
Kristianstads			74	0	15	0	0	0	2	0	91	0
BK Häcken	2021	Damallsvenskan	—		5	0	—		—		5	0
BK Häcken	2022	Damallsvenskan	24	1	5	1	—		2	0	31	2
BK Häcken	2023	Damallsvenskan	25	2	5	0	—		10	0	40	2
BK Häcken	2024	Damallsvenskan	24	0	1	1	—		2	0	27	1
BK Häcken	Total		73	3	16	2	0	0	14	0	103	5
Tottenham Hotspur	2024–25	Women's Super League	6	0	0	0	0	0	—		6	0
Tottenham Hotspur	2025–26	Women's Super League	9	0	1	0	3	0	—		13	0
Tottenham Hotspur	Total		15	0	1	0	3	0	0	0	19	0
Career total			228	5	37	2	3	0	16	0	284	7

=== International ===
As of match played 25 February 2025

Appearances and goals by national team and year
National team	Year	Apps	Goals
Sweden	2021	3	0
Sweden	2022	1	0
Sweden	2023	1	0
Sweden	2024	3	1
Total		8	1

Scores and results list Sweden's goal tally first, score column indicates score after each Rybrink goal.

List of international goals scored by Josefine Rybrink
No.	Date	Venue	Opponent	Score	Result	Competition	Ref.
1	12 July 2024	Stade Gaston Gérard, Dijon, France	France	1–0	1–2	UEFA Women's Euro 2025 qualifying	
