= Cláudia Lima =

Portuguese footballer

Personal information
- Full name: Cláudia Isabel Espinheira Lima
- Date of birth: 5 September 1996 (age 30)
- Place of birth: Porto, Portugal
- Position: Midfielder

Team information
- Current team: Boavista
- Number: 27

Senior career*
Years	Team	Apps	(Gls)
2015–2018	Boavista	20	(3)
2018–	Valadares Gaia	58	(5)

International career^{‡}
2015–	Portugal	7	(0)
- * Club domestic league appearances and goals as of 17:33, 13 July 2021 (UTC) ‡ National team caps and goals as of 17:33, 13 July 2021 (UTC)

Cláudia Isabel Espinheira Lima (born 5 September 1996) is a Portuguese footballer who plays as a midfielder and has appeared for the Portugal women's national team.

== Career ==
Lima has been capped for the Portugal national team, appearing for the team during the 2019 FIFA Women's World Cup qualifying cycle.
