= Klaudia Olejniczak =

Polish footballer

Personal information
- Date of birth: 20 January 1997 (age 29)
- Place of birth: Gostyń, Poland
- Position: Defender

Youth career
- Szewa Gostyń
- 2010–2016: Medyk Konin

Senior career*
Years	Team	Apps	(Gls)
2016–2020	Medyk Konin		
2020–2022	Czarni Sosnowiec	10	(0)
2022–2023	KP Bydgoszcz	15	(0)
2023–2025	Rekord Bielsko-Biała	29	(4)

International career
2018–2019	Poland	3	(0)
- * Club domestic league appearances and goals as of 21:46, 2 June 2026 (UTC)

Klaudia Olejniczak (born 20 January 1997) is a Polish professional footballer who plays as a defender. She has been a member of the Poland women's national team.

== Career statistics ==
=== International ===
Appearances and goals by national team and year
National team	Year	Apps	Goals
Poland	2018	1	0
Poland	2019	2	0
Total		3	0

== Honours ==
Medyk Konin

- Ekstraliga: 2016–17
- Polish Cup: 2016–17, 2018–19

Czarni Sosnowiec

- Ekstraliga: 2020–21
