= Luana Bühler =

Swiss football player (born 1996)

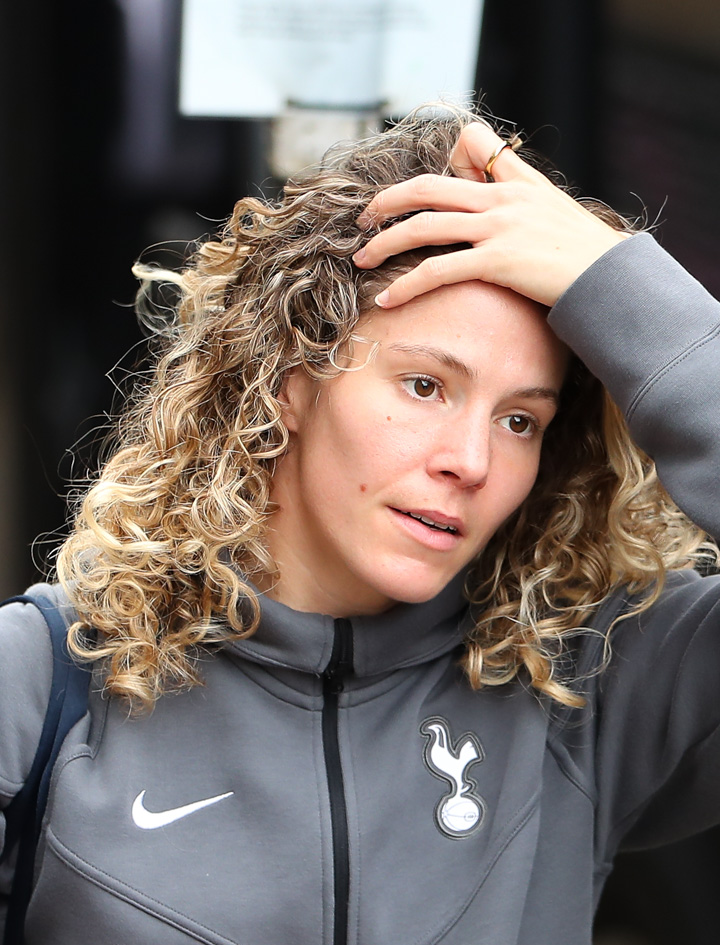
- Bühler in 2024

Personal information
- Full name: Luana Chiara Bühler
- Date of birth: 28 April 1996 (age 30)
- Place of birth: Lucerne, Switzerland
- Height: 1.71 m (5 ft 7 in)
- Position: Defender

Senior career*
Years	Team	Apps	(Gls)
2016–2018	FC Zürich	22	(3)
2018–2023	Hoffenheim	82	(5)
2023–2026	Tottenham Hotspur	22	(0)

International career^{‡}
2012–2013	Switzerland U17	8	(0)
2014–2015	Switzerland U19	8	(0)
2018–	Switzerland	61	(3)
- * Club domestic league appearances and goals as of 15:20, 17 May 2026 (UTC) ‡ National team caps and goals as of 26 June 2025

Luana Chiara Bühler (Swiss Standard German: [luˈaːna ˈki̯aːra ˈbyːlər]; born 28 April 1996) is a Swiss professional footballer who plays as a defender for the Switzerland national team.

== Club career ==
Bühler played as a junior at FC Schötz, where she played on boys' teams. In July 2012 she moved to SC Kriens in the Nationalliga A, where she played her first game with the first team in the Swiss Cup in November of the same year. In 2014 her team was integrated into FC Luzern. In 2016 she had to pause for almost a year because of her second cruciate ligament tear after 2011. In 2017 she moved to FC Zürich, for whom she also played in the Champions League. In 2018 she won the double with the club. In the summer of 2018, she switched to TSG 1899 Hoffenheim in the Bundesliga.

For the 2023/24 season, she was signed by Women's Super League club Tottenham Hotspur and given a contract that runs until 30 June 2025. On 24 July 2025, it was announced that Spurs had made use of their option to extend her contract with the club for a further season. After missing the 2025–26 season due to injury, Bühler departed from Tottenham in the summer of 2026 upon the expiry of her contract.

== International career ==
Bühler made her senior debut against Italy on 28 February 2018 at the Cyprus Cup. She appeared for the team during the 2019 World Cup qualifying cycle. She took part in the Euro 2022 and was in two of three group games in the starting lineup. Switzerland was eliminated after the preliminary round. She was named to the Swiss squad for the 2023 World Cup.

== Personal life ==
Bühler grew up in Altishofen with five siblings. She completed her schooling at the Kantonsschule Willisau in 2015 with her high school diploma. In 2019 she completed a bachelor's degree in business administration at the University of Zurich. Since then she has been pursuing a master's degree in the same subject.

== Career statistics ==
=== Club ===
As of match played 16 May 2026

Appearances and goals by club, season and competition
Club	Season	League			National cup (Note: Includes Swiss Women's Cup, DFB-Pokal, Women's FA Cup)		League cup (Note: Includes FA Women's League Cup)		Continental (Note: Includes UEFA Women's Champions League)		Total	
Club	Season	Division	Apps	Goals	Apps	Goals	Apps	Goals	Apps	Goals	Apps	Goals
FC Zurich	2016–17	Nationalliga A	5	0	1	0	—		0	0	6	0
FC Zurich	2017–18	Nationalliga A	17	3	4	0	—		4	0	25	3
FC Zurich	Total		22	3	5	0	—		4	0	31	3
1899 Hoffenheim	2018–19	Frauen-Bundesliga	18	1	4	0	—		—		22	1
1899 Hoffenheim	2019–20	Frauen-Bundesliga	13	2	1	0	—		—		14	2
1899 Hoffenheim	2020–21	Frauen-Bundesliga	18	1	2	0	—		—		20	1
1899 Hoffenheim	2021–22	Frauen-Bundesliga	16	1	1	0	—		8	1	25	2
1899 Hoffenheim	2022–23	Frauen-Bundesliga	17	0	2	0	—		—		19	0
1899 Hoffenheim	Total		82	5	10	0	0	0	8	1	100	6
Tottenham Hotspur	2023–24	Women's Super League	16	0	4	0	1	0	—		21	0
Tottenham Hotspur	2024–25	Women's Super League	6	0	1	0	2	0	—		9	0
Tottenham Hotspur	2025–26	Women's Super League	0	0	0	0	0	0	—		0	0
Tottenham Hotspur	Total		22	0	5	0	3	0	0	0	30	0
Career total			126	8	20	0	3	0	12	1	161	9

=== International ===
As of match played 26 June 2025

Appearances and goals by national team and year
National team	Year	Apps	Goals
Switzerland	2018	10	0
Switzerland	2019	4	0
Switzerland	2020	3	0
Switzerland	2021	9	0
Switzerland	2022	8	1
Switzerland	2023	12	0
Switzerland	2024	10	2
Switzerland	2025	5	0
Total		61	3

Scores and results list Switzerland's goal tally first, score column indicates score after each Bühler goal.

List of international goals scored by Luana Bühler
No.	Date	Venue	Opponent	Score	Result	Competition
1.	6 September 2022	Stade de la Tuilière, Lausanne, Switzerland	Moldova	3–0	15–0	2023 FIFA Women's World Cup qualification
2.	5 April 2024	Letzigrund, Zürich, Switzerland	Turkey	2–0	3–1	UEFA Women's Euro 2025 qualifying
3.	9 April 2024	Dalga Arena, Baku, Azerbaijan	Azerbaijan	2–0	4–0	UEFA Women's Euro 2025 qualifying

== Honours ==
FC Zurich

- Nationalliga A: 2018
- Swiss Women's Cup : 2018
