= Dagmara Grad =

Polish footballer

Personal information
- Date of birth: 1 June 1990 (age 36)
- Position: Defender

Senior career*
Years	Team	Apps	(Gls)
2005–2011	AZS Wrocław		
2011–2013	BV Cloppenburg	36	(1)
2014–2015	Zagłębie Lubin		
2015–2017	Medyk Konin		
2017–2020	Czarni Sosnowiec	63	(4)
2021–2022	KA 4 resPect Krobia	10	(3)

International career
2012–2019	Poland	27	(0)
- * Club domestic league appearances and goals

Dagmara Grad (born 1 June 1990) is a Polish former professional footballer who played as a defender. She earned 27 caps for the Poland women's national team.

== Career ==
Grad has been capped for the Poland national team, appearing for the team during the 2019 FIFA Women's World Cup qualifying cycle.

== Career statistics ==
=== International ===
Appearances and goals by national team and year
National team	Year	Apps	Goals
Poland	2012	6	0
Poland	2017	12	0
Poland	2018	7	0
Poland	2019	2	0
Total		27	0

== Honours ==
AZS Wrocław

- Ekstraliga: 2007–08
- Polish Cup: 2008–09

Medyk Konin

- Ekstraliga: 2015–16, 2016–17
- Polish Cup: 2015–16, 2016–17
