= Heidi Ellingsen =

Norwegian footballer (born 1998)

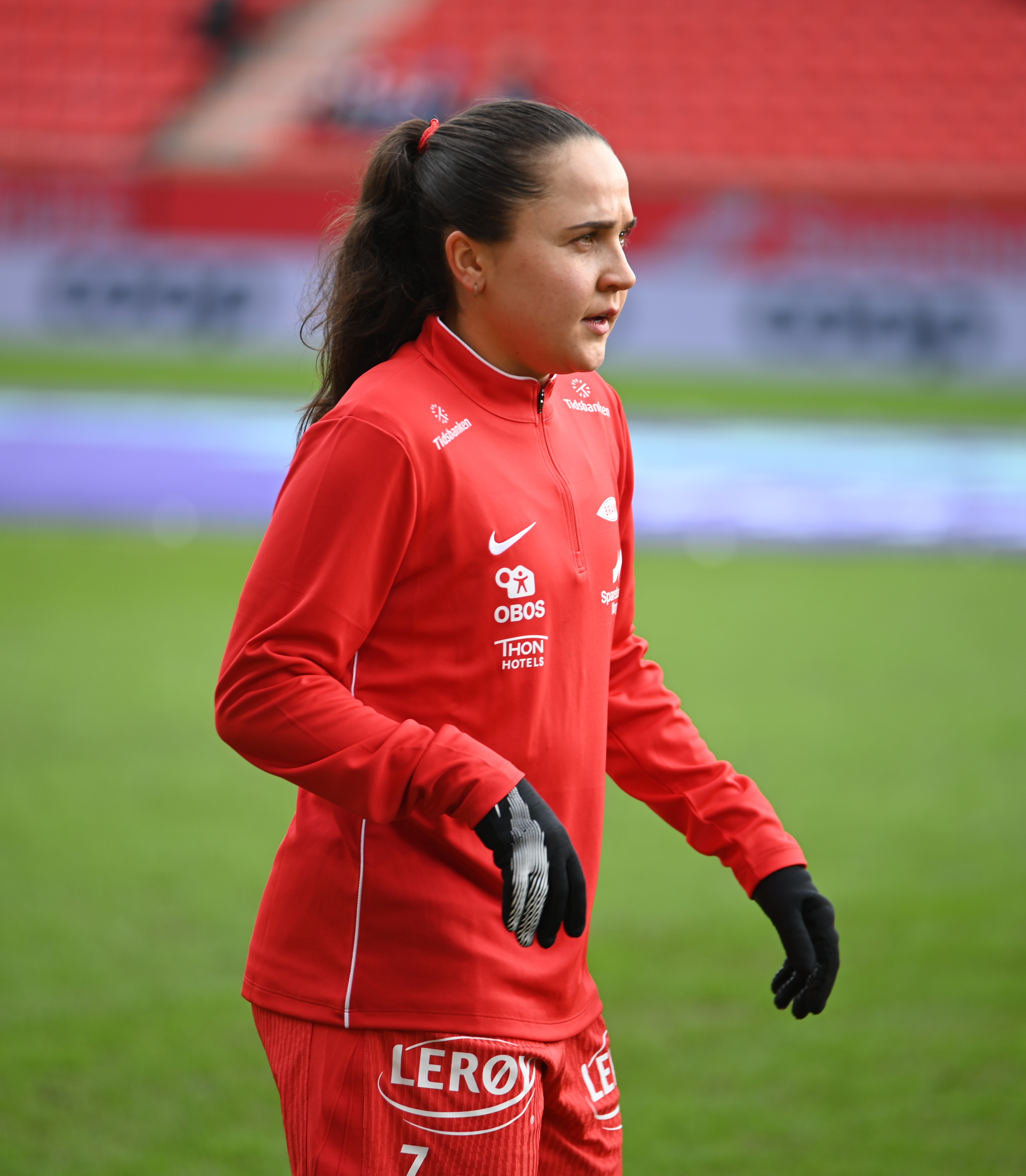
- Ellingsen in 2026

Personal information
- Full name: Heidi Elisabeth Ellingsen
- Date of birth: 28 July 1998 (age 28)
- Height: 1.64 m (5 ft 5 in)
- Position: Midfielder

Team information
- Current team: Haugesund

Youth career
- –2012: Lier
- 2013: Lyn

Senior career*
Years	Team	Apps	(Gls)
2013–2016	Lyn	67	(2)
2017–2018	Stabæk	38	(3)
2019–2020	Lillestrøm	24	(0)
2021–2022	Linköping	45	(2)
2023–2024	Växjö	14	(0)
2025–	Brann	12	(0)

International career^{‡}
2013	Norway U-15	4	(0)
2014	Norway U-16	8	(0)
2014–2015	Norway U-17	12	(1)
2015–2017	Norway U-19	13	(1)
2018–2022	Norway U-23	12	(0)
2019–2021	Norway	5	(0)
- * Club domestic league appearances and goals as of 6 September 2025 ‡ National team caps and goals as of 20 September 2023

Heidi Elisabeth Ellingsen (born 28 July 1998) is a Norwegian footballer who plays as a midfielder for Toppserien club Haugesund and the Norway national team.

== Club career ==
Ellingsen played in Lier IL growing up before she went to Lyn. She became part of a very good age-specific team in Lyn, together with Frida Maanum and Andrea Willmann, among others. The team won both the Dana Cup and the Norway Cup in 2014. She played in the 1st division for Lyn from 2013 to 2016. In 2015, she was on several training stays with the big German club VfL Wolfsburg.

Before the 2017 season, she went to Stabæk in the Toppserien, where she quickly became an important player in the team. After two seasons in Stabæk, she signed for LSK Kvinner in October 2018.

In LSK Kvinner, she was designated as the one to replace Ingrid Syrstad Engen, but in Syrstad Engen's last match for the club, Ellingsen suffered an ankle injury after being overstepped. After three and a half months out with injury, she was back in September 2019, but shortly after she was back, she tore her Achilles in training. Thus, almost the entire 2019 season was spent with injuries.

In January 2021, she signed a two-year contract with Swedish club Linköping FC.

In December 2022, it became known that she had signed a one-year contract with Växjö DFF.

== National team career ==
Ellingsen has international matches for J16, U17, U19, U23 and the Norwegian senior national team.

She was called up to the Norwegian senior national team for the first time in February 2019, after there was a withdrawal from the squad for the Algarve Cup. On 27 February 2019, she made her debut for the senior national team against Denmark during the Algarve Cup.

== Merits ==
LSK

- Toppserien : 2019
- Norwegian Cup : 2019

Norway

- Algarve Cup : 2019
