= Ella Morris =

English footballer (born 2002)

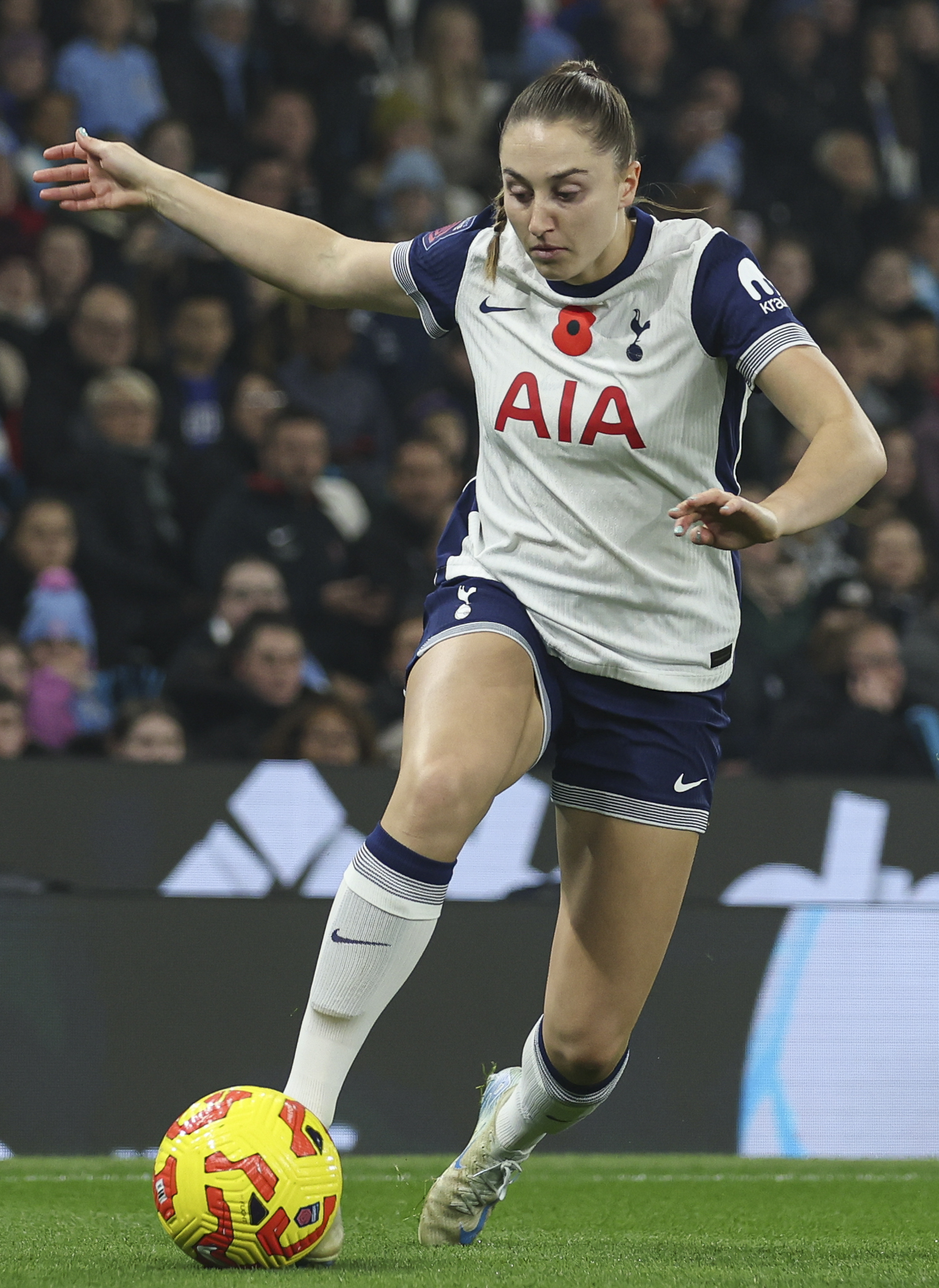
- Morris playing for Tottenham in 2025

Personal information
- Full name: Ella Beth Morris
- Date of birth: 23 September 2002 (age 24)
- Place of birth: Southampton, England
- Height: 1.68 m (5 ft 6 in)
- Position: Defender

Team information
- Current team: Tottenham Hotspur
- Number: 3

Youth career
- Southampton

Senior career*
Years	Team	Apps	(Gls)
2018–2024	Southampton	78	(12)
2024–	Tottenham Hotspur	17	(1)

International career^{‡}
2018–2019	England U17	9	(0)
2021	England U19	0	(0)
2023–	England U23	14	(2)
- * Club domestic league appearances and goals as of 07:45, 14 September 2026 (UTC) ‡ National team caps and goals as of 13 May 2025

Ella Beth Morris (born 23 September 2002) is an English professional footballer who plays as a defender for Women's Super League club Tottenham Hotspur. She has previously represented England at under-17, under-19 and under-23 levels.

== Early life ==
Morris began her youth career at the Hampshire Centre of Excellence aged 7, joined Southampton at the age of 14, and featured as part of the under-16 team in the Talent Pathway League.

She attended Barton Peveril Sixth Form College in Eastleigh, Hampshire.

== Club career ==
Morris first featured for Southampton in the Southern Region Women's Football League 2018–19 season, scoring 2 goals in 7 appearances for the Saints in their promotion winning season.

In her second season with Southampton, 2019–20, Morris played in the Women's National League Division One South West. She was named Southampton Women's Player of the Season, after receiving the most fan votes, as well as Player's Player of the Season. Saints manager Marieanne Spacey-Cale credited her crucial assists and two important goals in the season, having stepped up from the under-16s.

On 5 January 2022, in the 2021–22 FA Cup fourth round at St Mary's Stadium, Morris scored the winning goal in extra time against Women's Championship side Bristol City for a 1–0 victory. She ended the 2021–22 season in the National League South with 4 goals in 22 appearances for the club, as Southampton gained promotion to the Women's Championship for the first time in the club's history.

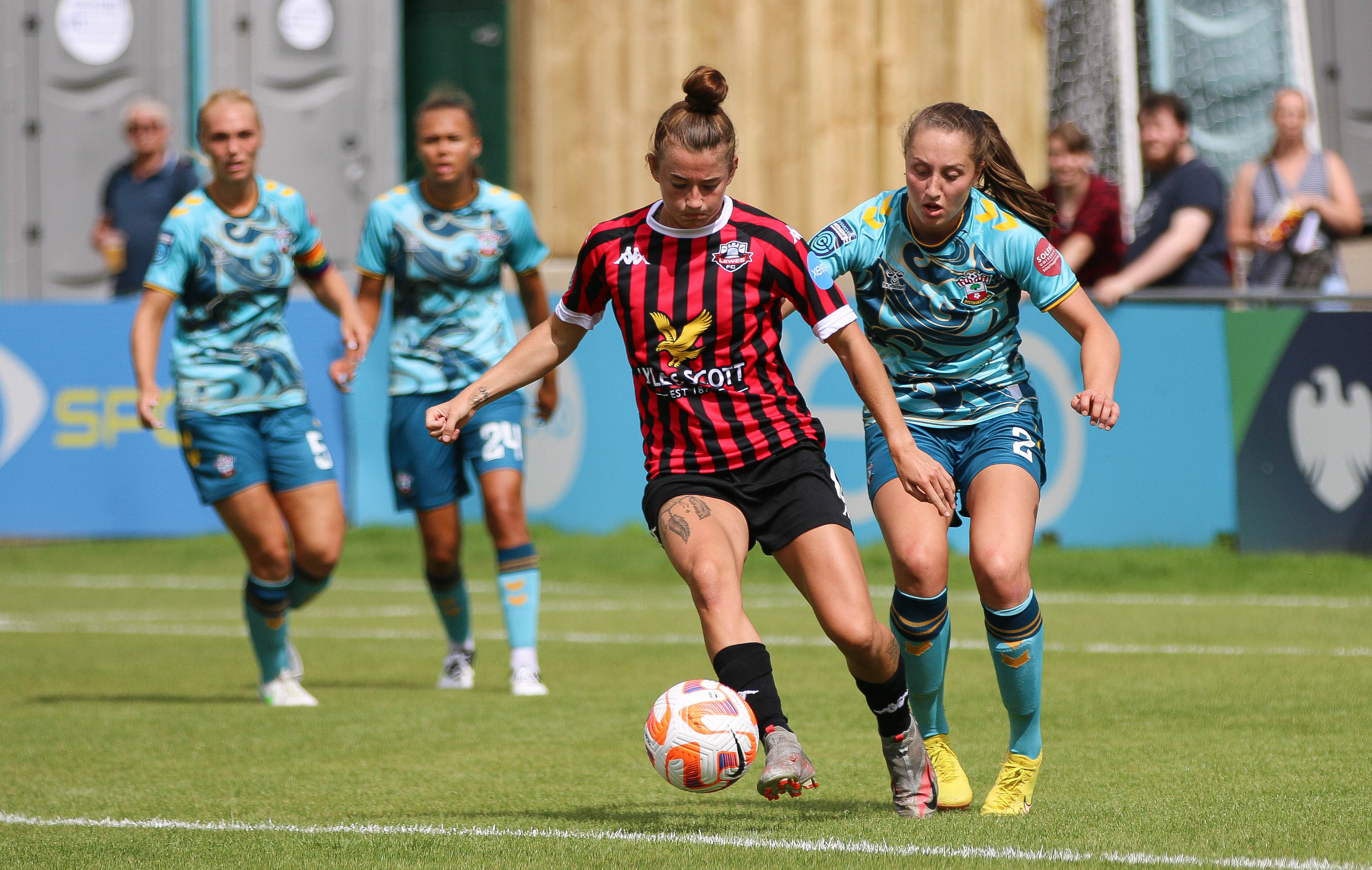
Morris (right) playing for Southampton against Lewes in 2022.

On 28 August 2022, Morris helped the Saints come back from two goals down at half time against Lewes, scoring the first of two goals for a draw 2-2. In May 2023, she was voted second in the Women's Championships Player of the Season award for 2022–23.

On 27 August 2023, in the Saints opening game of the 2023–24 Championship against Lewes, Morris scored within five minutes of appearing as a substitute in a 4–1 victory.

On 10 December 2023, in the 2023–24 FA Cup third round, she created both goals in the 2–1 win over Portsmouth, providing a series of dangerous crosses leading to an own goal and an assist.

In June 2024, Morris left Southampton upon the expiration of her contract. On 16 July, she signed with Women's Super League club Tottenham Hotspur on a three-year contract.

== International career ==
Morris has represented England in the U15, U16, U17, U18, U19 and U23 youth teams.

On 18 September 2018, she was named as part of the under-17 squad for 2019 U-17 Championship qualification, making her debut as a 59th-minute substitute in a 7–0 win over Azerbaijan on 22 September. In May 2019, Morris was named as part of the squad for the final tournament, playing the full 90 minutes as right-back against Germany, Austria and the Netherlands.

In February 2023, she received her first call up to the under-23s for fixtures against Spain and Belgium. On 25 September 2023, with England U23, Morris scored her debut youth international goal for England with a volley for the final goal in a 3–0 victory over Belgium.

On 4 December 2023, she scored the opening goal in the under-23s 1–1 draw against Spain.

Morris received her first call-up to the England senior squad on 13 May 2025 for the UEFA Nations League fixtures against Portugal and Spain later that month. However, she was forced to withdraw from the squad on 28 May after suffering an anterior cruciate ligament injury in training.

== Personal life ==
Morris's idols are Ryan Bertrand, Kyle Walker and Lucy Bronze. She looks up to former Saints midfielder James Ward-Prowse and has paid tribute by replicating his golf-swing goal celebration.

== Career statistics ==
=== Club ===
As of match played 13 September 2026

Appearances and goals by club, season and competition
Club	Season	League			FA Cup		League cup (Note: Includes Women's League Cup)		Total	
Club	Season	Division	Apps	Goals	Apps	Goals	Apps	Goals	Apps	Goals
Southampton	2018–19	Southern Region WFL	7	2	0	0	0	0	7	2
Southampton	2019–20	Women's National League Div. 1	8	2	1	0	0	0	9	2
Southampton	2020–21	Women's National League Div. 1	0	0	2	1	0	0	2	1
Southampton	2021–22	Women's National League Div. 1	22	4	3	1	0	0	25	5
Southampton	2022–23	Women's Championship	22	1	1	0	2	0	25	1
Southampton	2023–24	Women's Championship	19	3	1	1	3	0	23	4
Southampton	Total		78	12	8	3	5	0	91	15
Tottenham Hotspur	2024–25	Women's Super League	12	1	0	0	1	0	13	1
Tottenham Hotspur	2025–26	Women's Super League	3	0	1	0	0	0	4	0
Tottenham Hotspur	2026–27	Women's Super League	2	0	0	0	0	0	2	0
Tottenham Hotspur	Total		17	1	1	0	1	0	19	1
Career total			95	13	9	3	6	0	110	16

== Honours ==
Southampton F.C.

- Southern Region Women's Football League Premier Division: 2018–19
- Southern Region Women's Football League Cup: 2018–19
- FA Women's National League South: 2021–22
- FA Women's National League Cup: 2021–22

Individual

- Southampton Women's Player of the Season: 2019–20
- Southampton Player's Player of the Season: 2019–20
- Women's Championship Player of the Season: 2022–23 runner-up
