= Liu Huiting =

Chinese footballer

Personal information
- Full name: Liu Huiting
- Date of birth: 21 November 1990 (age 35)
- Position: Midfielder

Team information
- Current team: Changchun Zhuoyue
- Number: 18

Senior career*
Years	Team	Apps	(Gls)
2020–	Changchun Zhuoyue	13	(0)

International career^{‡}
2009	China U19		(0)
2018–2019	China	7	(0)
- * Club domestic league appearances and goals as of 10 October 2020 ‡ National team caps and goals as of 6 March 2019

Liu Huiting (simplified Chinese: 刘慧婷; traditional Chinese: 劉慧婷; pinyin: Liú Huìtíng; born 21 November 1990) is a Chinese footballer who plays as a midfielder for Chinese Women's Super League club Changchun Zhuoyue WFC. She has been a member of the China women's national team.
