= Carola Fasel =

Swiss footballer (born 1997)

Personal information
- Date of birth: 27 June 1997 (age 29)
- Place of birth: Fribourg, Switzerland
- Position: Defender

Youth career
- 20??–2008: FC Wünnewil-Flamatt
- 2009–2014: Young Boys

Senior career*
Years	Team	Apps	(Gls)
2014–2020	Young Boys	96	(4)
2020–2021	Nancy	3	(0)
2021–2023	Young Boys	19	(0)

International career
2013–2014	Switzerland U17	6	(1)
2014–2026	Switzerland U19	14	(0)
2019–2020	Switzerland	3	(0)
- * Club domestic league appearances and goals

Carola Fasel (born 27 June 1997), is a former Swiss professional footballer who played as a defender.

== Club career ==
Carola Fasel began her football career with FC Wünnewil (later FC Wünnewil-Flamatt), and at the age of twelve, she joined the women’s U19 team of Young Boys. The central defender progressed through all youth levels at the club before making her debut in the first team in the Swiss Women's Super League at the age of 18, eventually becoming a regular starter.

In the 2020–21 season, Fasel moved abroad to play for Nancy, a club competing in the second tier of women’s football in France. She appeared in the first three matches of the Division 2 Féminine before the league was suspended after just five rounds due to the COVID-19 pandemic. After the season was officially cancelled at Easter 2021, Carola Fasel returned to BSC YB in June. She made her final appearance for the club on 24 September 2022 and subsequently retired from professional football.
