= Frida Maanum =

Norwegian footballer (born 1999)

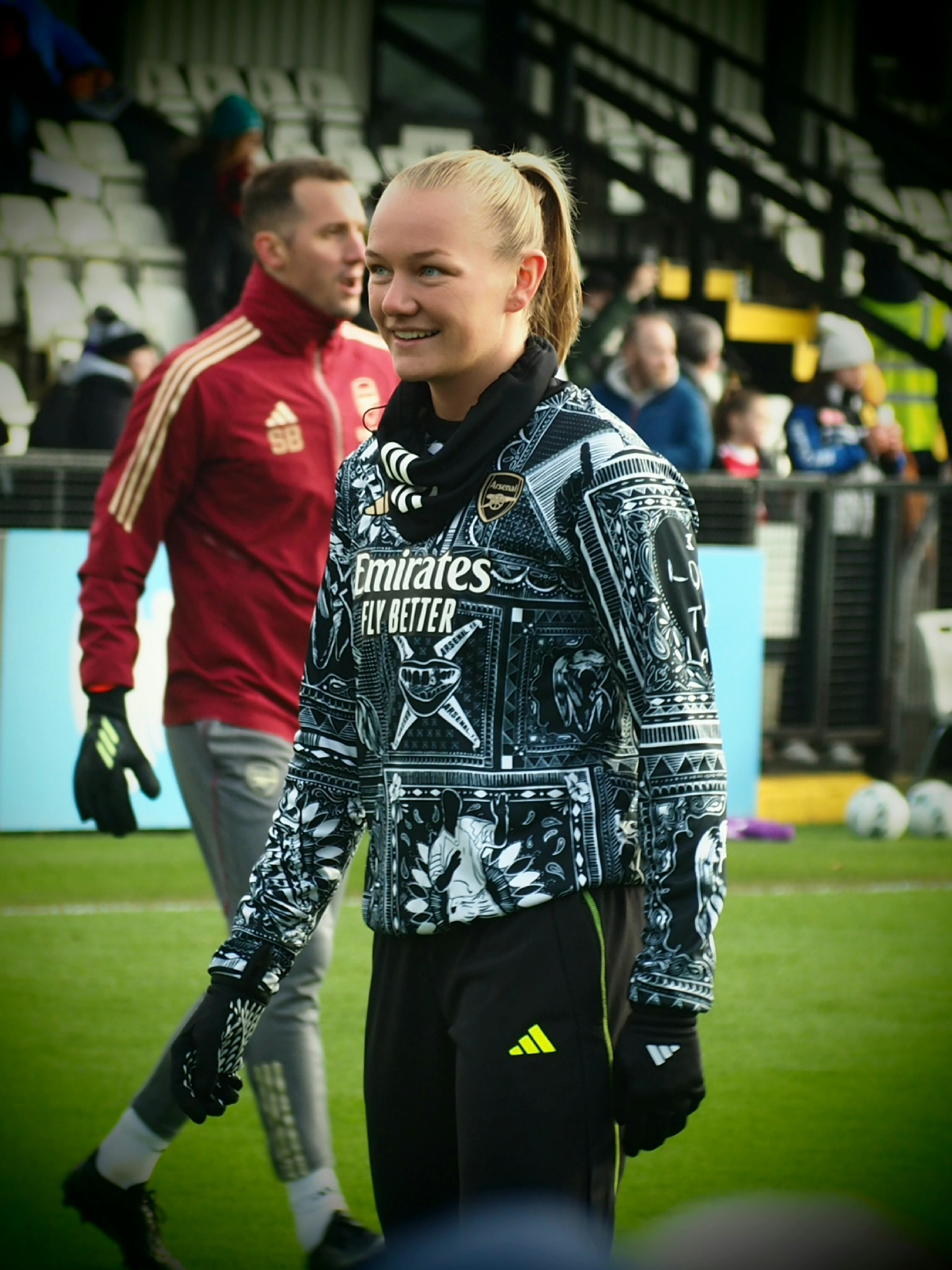
- Maanum playing for Arsenal in 2024

Personal information
- Full name: Frida Leonhardsen Maanum
- Date of birth: 16 July 1999 (age 27)
- Place of birth: Oslo, Norway
- Height: 1.73 m (5 ft 8 in)
- Positions: Midfielder; forward

Team information
- Current team: Arsenal
- Number: 12

Senior career*
Years	Team	Apps	(Gls)
2014–2016	Lyn	45	(8)
2017	Stabæk	11	(2)
2017–2021	Linköping	70	(19)
2021–	Arsenal	109	(29)

International career^{‡}
2014–2015	Norway U16	12	(3)
2014–2016	Norway U17	24	(5)
2016–2017	Norway U19	10	(1)
2017	Norway U23	2	(0)
2017–	Norway	104	(24)
- * Club domestic league appearances and goals as of 22 November 2026 ‡ National team caps and goals as of 14 October 2026

Frida Leonhardsen Maanum (Norwegian: [ˈfriːdɑ ˈleːʊnhɑɖsn̩ ˈmɑːnʉm]; born 16 July 1999) is a Norwegian professional footballer who plays as a midfielder for Women's Super League club Arsenal and the Norway national team. Prior to her move to Arsenal, she played for Stabæk and Linköping.

== Club career ==
=== Lyn ===
Maanum played youth football for Bærumløkka, Stabæk, and eventually Lyn. She was part of a talented age-specific team in Lyn, together with Heidi Ellingsen and Andrea Wilmann, among others. They won both the Dana Cup and Norway Cup in 2014. In the autumn of 2014, she made her debut for Lyn's first team in the Toppserien.

=== Stabæk ===
In 2017, Maanum left Lyn to join Stabæk. She had been involved in all of their matches, before it was announced that she had completed a transfer to Damallsvenskan club Linköping after only half a season with Stabæk.

=== Linköping ===
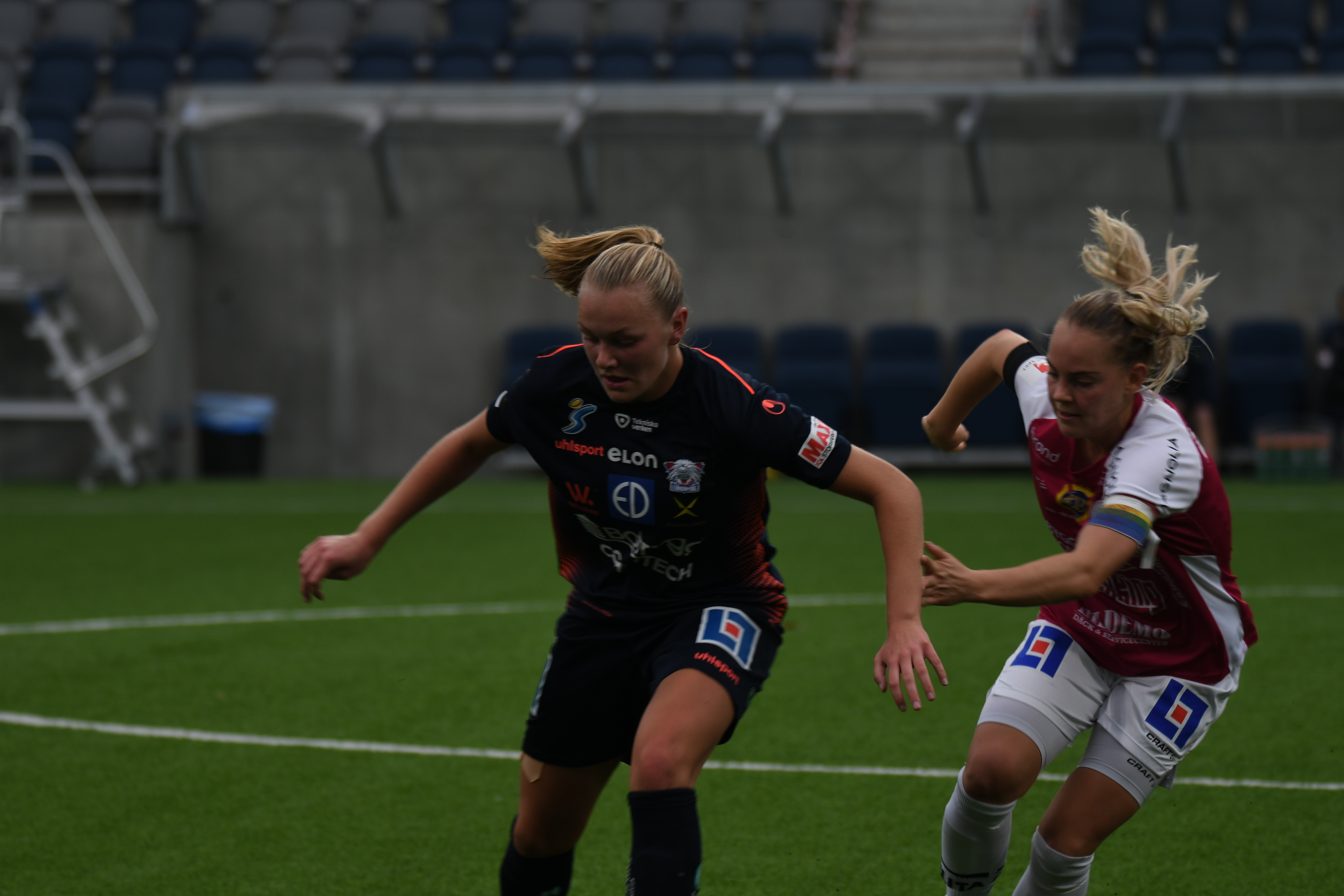
Maanum during Linköping's match against IK Uppsala on 27 September 2020

At the age of 18, Maanum joined Swedish side Linköping. She would go on to win the 2017 Damallsvenskan title in her debut season. Maanum quickly became a key player, and in the 2020–21 season, was named as club captain at the age of 21. She marked her last appearance for the club with a goal in a 4–1 victory over Örebro. In May 2021, local newspaper Corren placed Maanum in 14th place when naming the 30 best players to have played for Linköping.

=== Arsenal ===
==== 2021–22 season ====
On 27 July 2021, Women's Super League giants Arsenal confirmed the signing of Maanum. She quickly established herself as an exciting player. On 5 October, Maanum scored her first goal for Arsenal in a Champions League match against Barcelona. On 12 December, Maanum came off the bench and netted a brace in a 4–0 win over Leicester City. Despite a blistering start, her playing time decreased in the second half of the season. She was nevertheless nominated for Young Player of the Year for the 2021–22 Women's Super League season.

==== 2022–23 season ====
On 19 October 2022, Maanum was handed her first start of the season in Arsenal's Champions League away match against reigning champions Lyon, and got on the scoresheet in an emphatic 5–1 win for the Gunners. Four days later on 23 October, Maanum scored her first league goal of the season in a 2–0 away victory against Liverpool. She was later voted as Arsenal's Player of the Month for October 2022. On 21 December, she scored a hat-trick and provided an assist in a 9–1 group stage win over Zürich in the Champions League, earning the Player of the Match award. On 26 January 2023, Maanum scored twice in a 3–0 win over Aston Villa in the Conti Cup. She was then voted Arsenal's Player of the Month for January 2023. Maanum played the full 90 minutes in Arsenal's 3–1 Conti Cup final triumph over London rivals Chelsea on 5 March. On 25 March, Maanum scored Arsenal's fifth goal in a 5–1 North London Derby win over Tottenham Hotspur. Three days later on 29 March, Maanum scored a delightful goal from outside the box, helping Arsenal to a 2–0 (2–1 on agg.) second-leg victory over Bayern Munich, and earning Arsenal a spot in the Champions League semi-finals. This goal was later voted by fans as the UEFA Women's Champions League Goal of the Season. On 2 April, Maanum scored the crucial equaliser in Arsenal's home match against Manchester City, which Arsenal went on to win 2–1. Maanum finished the season with a tally of 16 goals and 5 assists in all competitions. She won the Arsenal Women Supporters Club Player of the Season award, and was nominated for both Arsenal Player of the Season and the Women's Super League Player of the Season.

On 1 June 2023, after a stellar second campaign, it was announced that Maanum had signed a new contract with the club.

==== 2023–24 season ====
On 19 November 2023, Maanum scored her first league goal of the season in a 3–0 away win against Brighton. In December 2023, she won the Football Supporters' Association Player of the Year award.

On 31 March 2024, Maanum collapsed off the ball in the 2023-2024 FA Women's League Cup final. She was given oxygen at the scene after being down for around 9 minutes, before being stretchered off. Arsenal later reported that she was 'conscious, talking and stable'. On 4 April, Arsenal confirmed that she had undergone extensive testing and that there were 'no obvious cardiac causes found'. Maanum was fitted with a monitoring device to record her heart function and was cleared to undergo a progressive return to training protocol for a one-week period, before a decision would be made as to when she would return to play.

==== 2024–25 season ====
On 22 September 2024, Maanum scored the early opener in Arsenal's 2–2 draw against Manchester City at Emirates Stadium in their first match of the 2024–25 Women's Super League season. On 26 September, she came off the bench to score Arsenal's fourth goal in a 4–0 (4–1 on agg.) victory against BK Häcken, which ensured that Arsenal progressed to the Champions League group stages.

In November 2024, Maanum won the Emirates goal of the month, for her spectacular goal against Brighton & Hove Albion.

==== 2025-26 season ====
On 1 February 2026, Maanum was named as the 2026 FIFA Women's Champions Cup Player of the Tournament after Arsenal defeated Corinthians 3–2 in the final.

== International career ==
At the age of 17, Maanum was selected to represent the senior Norwegian national team at the 2017 Euros. At that point, she had only played 10 matches in Norway's top division. Maanum made her debut on 11 July 2017, where she started in a match against France. Less than a week later, Maanum was handed another start in Norway's opening match at the Euros, which was against the Netherlands, the country hosting the tournament.

On 27 October 2020, Maanum scored the match-winning goal against Wales, which earned Norway qualification for the 2022 Euros.

She was called up to Norway's squad for both the 2019 World Cup and the 2022 Euros.

On 15 November 2022, Maanum scored an equaliser in a friendly match against England.

On 19 June 2023, Maanum included in Norway's squad for the 2023 FIFA Women's World Cup.

On 16 June 2025, Maanum was called up to the Norway squad for the UEFA Women's Euro 2025.

== Personal life ==
Maanum is in a relationship with former Swedish footballer and former Linköping teammate Emma Lennartsson.

== Career statistics ==
=== Club ===
As of match played 22 November 2026

Appearances and goals by club, season and competition
Club	Season	League			Cup		Continental		Other		Total	
Club	Season	Division	Apps	Goals	Apps	Goals	Apps	Goals	Apps	Goals	Apps	Goals
Lyn	2014	1. divisjon	7	0	0	0	–		–		7	0
Lyn	2015	1. divisjon	20	4	1	0	–		–		21	4
Lyn	2016	1. divisjon	18	4	0	0	–		–		18	4
Lyn	Total		45	8	1	0	0	0	0	0	46	8
Stabæk	2017	Toppserien	11	2	2	1	–		–		13	3
Linköping	2017	Damallsvenskan	6	1	1	0	–		–		7	1
Linköping	2018	Damallsvenskan	22	5	6	2	6	0	–		34	7
Linköping	2019	Damallsvenskan	22	6	2	0	3	2	–		27	8
Linköping	2020	Damallsvenskan	20	7	0	0	–		–		20	7
Linköping	2021	Damallsvenskan	0	0	1	1	–		–		1	1
Linköping	Total		70	19	10	3	9	2	0	0	89	24
Arsenal	2021–22	FA WSL	21	3	5	0	12	1	–		38	4
Arsenal	2022–23	FA WSL	22	9	5	2	11	5	–		38	16
Arsenal	2023–24	FA WSL	21	3	9	5	2	0	–		32	8
Arsenal	2024–25	FA WSL	22	7	5	2	15	4	–		42	13
Arsenal	2025–26	FA WSL	18	6	5	1	11	2	2 (Note: Appearances in FIFA Women's Champions Cup)	1	36	10
Arsenal	2026–27	FA WSL	5	1	0	0	4	1	—		9	2
Arsenal	Total		109	29	29	10	55	13	2	1	195	53
Career total			235	58	42	14	64	15	2	1	343	88

=== International ===
As of match played 13 October 2026

Appearances and goals by national team and year
National team	Year	Apps	Goals
Norway	2017	7	0
Norway	2018	10	0
Norway	2019	12	2
Norway	2020	5	1
Norway	2021	10	3
Norway	2022	16	3
Norway	2023	15	3
Norway	2024	9	9
Norway	2025	14	2
Norway	2026	6	1
Total		104	24

Scores and results list Norway's goal tally first, score column indicates score after each Maanum goal.

List of international goals scored by Frida Maanum
No.	Date	Venue	Opponent	Score	Result	Competition
1	3 September 2019	Brann Stadion, Bergen, Norway	England	1–1	2–1	Friendly
2	8 October 2019	Tórsvøllur, Tórshavn, Faroe Islands	Faroe Islands	9–0	13–0	UEFA Women's Euro 2022 qualifying
3	27 October 2020	Cardiff City Stadium, Cardiff, Wales	Wales	1–0	1–0	UEFA Women's Euro 2022 qualifying
4	25 November 2021	Arena Kombëtare, Tirana, Albania	Albania	1–0	7–0	2023 FIFA Women's World Cup qualification
5	25 November 2021	Arena Kombëtare, Tirana, Albania	Albania	5–0	7–0	2023 FIFA Women's World Cup qualification
6	30 November 2021	Yerevan Football Academy Stadium, Yerevan, Armenia	Armenia	4–0	10–0	2023 FIFA Women's World Cup qualification
7	7 April 2022	Sandefjord Arena, Sandefjord, Norway	Kosovo	3–0	5–1	2023 FIFA Women's World Cup qualification
8	7 July 2022	St Mary's Stadium, Southampton, England	Northern Ireland	2–0	4–1	UEFA Women's Euro 2022
9	15 November 2022	Pinatar Arena, Murcia, Spain	England	1–1	1–1	Friendly
10	11 April 2023	Gamla Ullevi, Gothenburg, Sweden	Sweden	1–1	3–3	Friendly
11	11 April 2023	Gamla Ullevi, Gothenburg, Sweden	Sweden	3–3	3–3	Friendly
12	26 September 2023	Estádio Cidade de Barcelos, Barcelos, Portugal	Portugal	1–0	2–3	2023–24 UEFA Women's Nations League
13	27 February 2024	Viking stadion, Stavanger, Norway	Croatia	4–0	5–0	2023–24 UEFA Women's Nations League play-offs
14	27 February 2024	Viking stadion, Stavanger, Norway	Croatia	5–0	5–0	2023–24 UEFA Women's Nations League play-offs
15	4 June 2024	Stadio Paolo Mazza, Ferrara, Italy	Italy	1–1	1–1	UEFA Women's Euro 2025 qualifying
16	25 October 2024	Loro Boriçi Stadium, Shkodër, Albania	Albania	1–0	5–0	UEFA Women's Euro 2025 qualifying play-offs
17	29 October 2024	Ullevaal Stadion, Oslo, Norway	Albania	1–0	9–0	UEFA Women's Euro 2025 qualifying play-offs
18	29 October 2024	Ullevaal Stadion, Oslo, Norway	Albania	4–0	9–0	UEFA Women's Euro 2025 qualifying play-offs
19	29 October 2024	Ullevaal Stadion, Oslo, Norway	Albania	5–0	9–0	UEFA Women's Euro 2025 qualifying play-offs
20	29 October 2024	Ullevaal Stadion, Oslo, Norway	Albania	6–0	9–0	UEFA Women's Euro 2025 qualifying play-offs
21	3 December 2024	Ullevaal Stadion, Oslo, Norway	Northern Ireland	2–0	3–0	UEFA Women's Euro 2025 qualifying play-offs
22	10 July 2025	Arena Thun, Thun, Switzerland	Iceland	3–1	4–1	UEFA Women's Euro 2025
23	10 July 2025	Arena Thun, Thun, Switzerland	Iceland	4–1	4–1	UEFA Women's Euro 2025
24	9 October 2026	Arcul de Triumf Stadium, Bucharest, Romania	Romania	2–0	2–0	2027 FIFA Women's World Cup qualification play-offs

== Honours ==
Linköping

- Damallsvenskan: 2017

Arsenal

- FA Women's League Cup: 2022–23, 2023–24
- UEFA Women's Champions League: 2024–25
- FIFA Women's Champions Cup: 2026

Norway

- Algarve Cup: 2019

Individual

- PFA Team of the Year: 2022–23 FA WSL
- FSA Player of the Year: 2023
- Arsenal Women's Player of the Month: October 2022 January 2023
- WSL Goal of the Month: November 2024
- Emirates Goal of the Month: November 2024

== See also ==
- List of women's footballers with 100 or more international caps
