= 2024–25 Leicester City W.F.C. season =

Leicester City
2024–25 season
- Chairman: Aiyawatt Srivaddhanaprabha
- Head coach: Amandine Miquel
- Stadium: King Power Stadium, Leicester
- WSL: 10th
- FA Cup: Fifth round
- League Cup: Group stage
- Top goalscorer: League: Janice Cayman (4); All: Yūka Momiki (6)
- Highest home attendance: 5,405 (vs. Manchester United, 17 November)
- Lowest home attendance: 1,398 (vs. Everton, 20 October)
- Average home league attendance: 2,908
- Biggest win: 5–2 v Birmingham City (H) (League Cup, 11 December 2024); 4–1 v Stoke City (H) (FA Cup, 15 January 2025); 3–0 v Aston Villa (H) (WSL, 16 February 2025)
- Biggest defeat: 0–4 v Manchester City (A) (WSL, 8 December 2024); 1–5 v Arsenal (A) (WSL, 15 April 2025)
Home colours	Away colours	Third colours

The 2024–25 Leicester City W.F.C. season was the club's 21st season of existence and their fourth season in the Women's Super League, the highest level of the football pyramid. Along with competing in the WSL, the club also contested two domestic cup competitions: the FA Cup and the League Cup.

On 15 July 2024, Amandine Miquel was named Leicester City manager ahead of the new season. She left Reims after seven years in order to take the job. The role had previously been occupied on an interim basis by Jennifer Foster since the sacking of Willie Kirk in March 2024.

== Squad ==
As of 16 February 2025

Note: Flags indicate national team as defined under FIFA eligibility rules; some limited exceptions apply. Players may hold more than one non-FIFA nationality.

No.	Pos.	Nation	Player
1	GK	GER	Janina Leitzig
2	DF	AUS	Courtney Nevin
3	MF	ENG	Sam Tierney
4	DF	NZL	C. J. Bott
5	DF	SCO	Sophie Howard
6	MF	JPN	Saori Takarada
7	FW	CAN	Deanne Rose
8	FW	FIN	Jutta Rantala
9	FW	GER	Lena Petermann
10	FW	FRA	Noémie Mouchon
11	MF	BEL	Janice Cayman
12	DF	ENG	Asmita Ale
13	GK	WAL	Olivia Clark
14	FW	ISL	Hlín Eiríksdóttir
17	DF	FRA	Julie Thibaud
19	FW	ENG	Denny Draper

No.	Pos.	Nation	Player
20	FW	ENG	Missy Goodwin
21	FW	WAL	Hannah Cain
22	DF	BEL	Sari Kees
25	FW	COL	Karla Torres (on loan from Santa Fe)
27	MF	ENG	Shannon O'Brien
28	FW	FRA	Shana Chossenotte
29	FW	JPN	Yūka Momiki
30	MF	ENG	Ruby Mace
31	DF	JAM	Chantelle Swaby
39	GK	ENG	Rebekah Dowsett
47	MF	ENG	Simone Sherwood
49	MF	WAL	Ffion Bowen
53	FW	ENG	Nelly Las
55	MF	ENG	Poppy Groves
57	FW	ENG	Sammy Kaczmar

== Transfers ==
=== Transfers in ===
Date	Position	Nationality	Name	From	Ref.
17 July 2024	DF	(England)	Asmita Ale	(England) Tottenham Hotspur	
18 July 2024	DF	(Jamaica)	Chantelle Swaby	(France) FC Fleury 91	
19 July 2024	DF	(Belgium)	Sari Kees	(Belgium) OH Leuven	
20 July 2024	MF	(England)	Ruby Mace	(England) Manchester City	
29 July 2024	FW	(France)	Noémie Mouchon	(France) Reims	
28 August 2024	FW	(France)	Shana Chossenotte	(France) Reims	
24 January 2025	GK	(Wales)	Olivia Clark	(Netherlands) Twente	
30 January 2025	FW	(Iceland)	Hlín Eiríksdóttir	(Sweden) Kristianstads DFF	

=== Loans in ===
Date	Position	Nationality	Name	To	Until	Ref.
31 January 2025	FW	(Colombia)	Karla Torres	(Colombia) Santa Fe	End of season	

=== Transfers out ===
Date	Position	Nationality	Name	To	Ref.
20 June 2024	MF	(Wales)	Josie Green	(England) Crystal Palace	
20 June 2024	GK	(England)	Demi Lambourne	(England) Sunderland	
20 June 2024	MF	(England)	Aimee Palmer	(England) Southampton	
20 June 2024	MF	(England)	Monique Robinson	(England) Sheffield United	
20 June 2024	FW	(Australia)	Remy Siemsen	(Sweden) Kristianstads DFF	
20 June 2024	FW	(England)	Aileen Whelan	Retired	
24 June 2024	MF	(England)	Ava Baker	(England) Birmingham City	
1 July 2024	FW	(England)	Mariela Dolan	(United States) Nova Southeastern Sharks	
1 July 2024	DF	(England)	Libby Wooffindin	(United States) Georgia Southern Eagles	
9 July 2024	DF	(England)	Jess Reavill	(England) Stoke City	
26 July 2024	MF	(England)	Abi Loydon	(England) Wolverhampton Wanderers	
15 August 2024	GK	(England)	Holly Mears	(England) Nottingham Forest	
15 January 2025	GK	(Netherlands)	Lize Kop	(England) Tottenham Hotspur	

=== Loans out ===
Date	Position	Nationality	Name	To	Until	Ref.
24 January 2025	MF	(Sweden)	Emilia Pelgander	(Sweden) FC Rosengård	End of season	

== Preseason ==
Leicester City participated in the inaugural Perth International Football Cup invitational friendly as part of preseason.

15 August 2024 Friendly	Leicester City	3–1	Sunderland	Leicester
	Rantala; Mouchon; Momiki	Report	(pen.)	Stadium: Belvoir Drive; Attendance: Behind-closed-doors

28 August 2024 Perth Cup	Manchester City	0–0 (4–3 p)	Leicester City	Perth, Australia
		Report		Stadium: Perth Rectangular
	Penalties
	Shaw (penalty scored); Fowler (penalty scored); Fujino (penalty scored); Hasegawa (penalty missed); Miedema (penalty scored)		(penalty missed) Momiki; (penalty scored) Petermann; (penalty missed) Howard; (penalty scored) Takarada; (penalty scored) Rose

1 September 2024 Perth Cup	Leicester City	5–2	West Ham United	Perth, Australia
	Momiki 10'; Tierney 33'; Goodwin 42'; Mouchon 50'; Takarada 76'	Report	Asseyi 90', 90+6'	Stadium: Perth Stadium

11 September 2024 Friendly	Manchester United	2–0	Leicester City	Carrington
	Malard; Galton	Report		Stadium: Trafford Training Centre; Attendance: Behind closed doors

== Women's Super League ==
=== Results summary ===
Overall								Home						Away					
Pld	W	D	L	GF	GA	GD	Pts	W	D	L	GF	GA	GD	W	D	L	GF	GA	GD
22	5	5	12	21	37	−16	20	5	2	4	15	13	+2	0	3	8	6	24	−18

Last updated: 10 May 2025.
Source: WSL

=== Results by matchday ===
Round	1	2	3	4	5	6	7	8	9	10	11	12	13	14	15	16	17	18	19	20	21	22
Ground	A	H	H	A	H	A	A	H	A	H	A	H	A	H	A	A	H	H	A	H	A	H
Result	D	L	L	D	W	L	L	L	L	D	L	W	L	W	L	L	W	D	L	L	D	W
Position	7	9	10	10	7	8	8	10	11	11	11	11	11	10	10	10	10	10	10	11	11	10

A = Away; H = Home; W = Win; D = Draw; L = Loss

=== Results ===
22 September 2024 1	Liverpool	1–1	Leicester City	St Helens
14:00	Haug 45'; Nagano (yellow card) 80'	Report	Rantala 53'; Kop (yellow card) 88'; Nevin (yellow card) 90+2'	Stadium: Totally Wicked Stadium; Attendance: 3,058; Referee: Adewunmi Soneye

29 September 2024 2	Leicester City	0–1	Arsenal	Leicester
15:00		Report	Maanum 55'; Codina (yellow card) 90+4'	Stadium: King Power Stadium; Attendance: 5,163; Referee: Elizabeth Simms

6 October 2024 3	Leicester City	0–2	Crystal Palace	Leicester
15:00	Goodwin (yellow card) 25'	Report	Blanchard 55', 68' (pen.)	Stadium: King Power Stadium; Attendance: 1,806; Referee: Stephen Parkinson

13 October 2024 4	Aston Villa	0–0	Leicester City	Aston
14:00	Kearns (yellow card) 19'; Maritz (yellow card) 45+2'; Staniforth (yellow card) 80'	Report	Nevin (yellow card) 33'; Kees (yellow card) 45'	Stadium: Villa Park; Attendance: 2,907; Referee: Amy Fearn

20 October 2024 5	Leicester City	1–0	Everton	Leicester
15:00	Momiki 8', (yellow card) 71'	Report	S. Holmgaard (yellow card) 11'	Stadium: King Power Stadium; Attendance: 1,398; Referee: Adewunmi Soneye

3 November 2024 6	Brighton & Hove Albion	1–0	Leicester City	Crawley
14:00	Parris 20'; Olislagers (yellow card) 43'; Kirby (yellow card) 79'; Losada (yellow card) 90+7'	Report		Stadium: Broadfield Stadium; Attendance: 2,082; Referee: Adewunmi Soneye

10 November 2024 7	West Ham United	1–0	Leicester City	Dagenham
15:00	Asseyi 45+7'; Paví (yellow card) 80'	Report	Mace (yellow card) 40'; Ale (yellow card) 70'; Rose (yellow card) 84'	Stadium: Victoria Road; Attendance: 1,617; Referee: Elizabeth Simms

17 November 2024 8	Leicester City	0–2	Manchester United	Leicester
15:00	Mace (yellow card) 76'	Report	Terland 45+3'; George (yellow card) 48'; Bizet 81'; Le Tissier (yellow card) 84'	Stadium: King Power Stadium; Attendance: 5,405; Referee: Stacey Fullicks

8 December 2024 9	Manchester City	4–0	Leicester City	Manchester
13:00	Shaw 2', 29'; Park 49'; Fowler 58'	Report		Stadium: Academy Stadium; Referee: Emily Heaslip

14 December 2024 10	Leicester City	1–1	Chelsea	Leicester
12:00	Goodwin 20'; Howard (yellow card) 45+1'; O'Brien (yellow card) 84'	Report	Kaptein 77'	Stadium: King Power Stadium; Attendance: 2,619; Referee: Kirsty Dowle

19 January 2025 11	Tottenham Hotspur	1–0	Leicester City	Leyton
12:30	Leitzig 4' (o.g.)	Report	Bott (yellow card) 43'; Thibaud (yellow card) 70'; Mace (yellow card) 73'	Stadium: Brisbane Road; Attendance: 1,314; Referee: Stacey Pearson

26 January 2025 12	Leicester City	2–1	Liverpool	Leicester
15:00	Cayman 17'; Goodwin 40'; Las (yellow card) 69'; Mace (yellow card) 74'; Cain (yellow card) 76'	Report	Smith 3', (yellow card) 76'; Bonner (yellow card) 44'	Stadium: King Power Stadium; Attendance: 2,964; Referee: Abigail Byrne

2 February 2025 13	Everton	4–1	Leicester City	Walton
14:00	Gago 5', 69'; S. Holmgaard (yellow card) 12'; Ladd (yellow card) 39'; Snoeijs 48'; Hayashi 57'	Report	O'Brien 16'	Stadium: Walton Hall Park; Attendance: 784; Referee: Stacey Pearson

16 February 2025 14	Leicester City	3–0	Aston Villa	Leicester
15:00	Cayman 29', 49'; Thibaud 50'; Bott (yellow card) 55'; Mace (yellow card) 73'; O'Brien (yellow card) 90'	Report	Baijings (yellow card) 73'	Stadium: King Power Stadium; Attendance: 2,065; Referee: Adewunmi Soneye

2 March 2025 15	Manchester United	2–0	Leicester City	Leigh
12:30	Malard 19'; Galton 45+2'; Miyazawa (yellow card) 89'	Report	Bott (yellow card) 74'	Stadium: Leigh Sports Village; Attendance: 3,950; Referee: Phoebe Cross

5 March 2025 16	Chelsea	3–1	Leicester City	Kingston upon Thames
19:30	Macario 8'; Beever-Jones 51'; Cuthbert 86'	Report	Mace (yellow card) 7'; O'Brien (yellow card) 44'; Momiki 55'; Nevin (yellow card) 82'	Stadium: Kingsmeadow; Referee: Abigail Byrne
Note: This match, originally scheduled for 16 March, was rescheduled due to Chelsea's participation in the 2025 Women's League Cup final.

23 March 2025 17	Leicester City	3–2	Brighton & Hove Albion	Leicester
15:00	O'Brien 11'; Takarada 35'; McLauchlan 45+5' (o.g.); Ale (yellow card) 89'; Thibaud (yellow card) 90+6'	Report	Symonds (yellow card) 43'; Auée (yellow card) 61'; Haley 73'; Kirby 81' (pen.)	Stadium: King Power Stadium; Attendance: 1,832; Referee: Amy Fearn

30 March 2025 18	Leicester City	1–1	Tottenham Hotspur	Leicester
14:00	Bott (yellow card) 39'; Rybrink 55' (o.g.)	Report	Spence 62'	Stadium: King Power Stadium; Attendance: 2,527; Referee: Grace Lowe

15 April 2025 19	Arsenal	5–1	Leicester City	Holloway
19:30	Foord 9', 31'; Blackstenius 16'; Maanum (yellow card) 36'; Mead 62'; Pelova 69'	Report	Momiki 66'; Goodwin (yellow card) 68'	Stadium: Emirates Stadium; Attendance: 5,539; Referee: Melissa Burgin
Note: This match, originally scheduled for 20 April, was rescheduled due to Arsenal's participation in the UEFA Champions League semi-finals

27 April 2025 20	Leicester City	0–1	Manchester City	Leicester
15:00	Cayman (yellow card) 73'	Report	Park 70'	Stadium: King Power Stadium; Attendance: 3,305; Referee: Ryan Atkin

4 May 2025 21	Crystal Palace	2–2	Leicester City	Sutton
14:00	Blanchard 69' (pen.), (yellow card) 82'; Larkin 90+8'	Report	Cain 45+2'; O'Brien 90+4'	Stadium: Gander Green Lane; Referee: Adewunmi Soneye

10 May 2025 22	Leicester City	4–2	West Ham United	Leicester
12:30	Cayman 9'; Cain 35', 59'; Tierney 69'	Report	Asseyi (yellow card) 44', (goal) 57', 63'	Stadium: King Power Stadium; Referee: Lucy May

=== League table ===
Pos	Team	Pld	W	D	L	GF	GA	GD	Pts	Qualification or relegation
8	Everton	22	6	6	10	24	32	−8	24	
9	West Ham United	22	6	5	11	36	41	−5	23	
10	Leicester City	22	5	5	12	21	37	−16	20	
11	Tottenham Hotspur	22	5	5	12	26	44	−18	20	
12	Crystal Palace (R)	22	2	4	16	20	65	−45	10	Relegation to the WSL2

Source: The Football Association
Rules for classification: 1) Points; 2) Goal difference; 3) Number of goals scored.
(R) Relegated

== Women's FA Cup ==
As a member of the first tier, Leicester entered the FA Cup in the fourth round proper.

15 January 2025 Fourth round	Leicester City	4–1	Stoke City	Nottingham
19:45	Momiki 13', 76'; Goodwin 29'; Las 90+2'	Report	Ravening 42' (pen.)	Stadium: Meadow Lane; Attendance: 276; Referee: Laura van Lier
Note: Rescheduled from 12 January due to frozen pitch.

9 February 2025 Fifth round	Manchester City	3–1	Leicester City	Manchester
14:00	Ouahabi 18'; Kerolin 29'; Shaw 59'	Report	Kees (yellow card) 65'; Las 82'	Stadium: Academy Stadium; Attendance: 1,959; Referee: Phoebe Cross

== Women's League Cup ==
2 October 2024 Group stage	Leicester City	1–1 (1–2 p)	Bristol City	Burton upon Trent
19:00	Chossenotte 67', (yellow card) 90+4'	Report	Lloyd-Smith 80'	Stadium: Pirelli Stadium; Attendance: 250; Referee: Lucy May
	Penalties
	Thibaud (penalty scored); Mouchon (penalty missed); Pelgander (penalty missed); Rantala (penalty missed); Chossenotte (penalty missed)		(penalty scored) Harrison; (penalty missed) Lloyd-Smith; (penalty missed) Ward; (penalty scored) Woolley; (penalty missed) Rodgers

24 November 2024 Group stage	Brighton & Hove Albion	0–0 (3–4 p)	Leicester City	Crawley
14:00		Report	Bott (yellow card) 60'; Chossenotte (yellow card) 88'	Stadium: Broadfield Stadium; Attendance: 1,069; Referee: Joanne Horwood
	Penalties
	Parris (penalty scored); Čanković (penalty scored); Seike (penalty scored); Agyemang (penalty missed); Symonds (penalty missed)		(penalty scored) Thibaud; (penalty scored) Mace; (penalty missed) Momiki; (penalty scored) Cayman; (penalty scored) Rose

11 December 2024 Group stage	Leicester City	5–2	Birmingham City	Nottingham
19:00	Kees (yellow card) 21'; Herron 34' (o.g.); Momiki 37' (pen.); Bott 39'; Sherwood 42'; Cain 67'	Report	Baker 13'; Worsey (yellow card) 90+6'; Murray 90+8'	Stadium: Meadow Lane; Attendance: 289; Referee: Phoebe Cross

Pos	Team	Pld	W	WPEN	LPEN	L	GF	GA	GD	Pts	Qualification	BHA	LEI	BIR	BRI
1	Brighton & Hove Albion	3	2	0	1	0	9	2	+7	7	Advanced to knock-out stage	—	0–0	–	6–2
2	Leicester City	3	1	1	1	0	6	3	+3	6		–	—	5–2	1–1
3	Birmingham City	3	1	0	0	2	5	9	−4	3		0–3	–	—	–
4	Bristol City	3	0	1	0	2	4	10	−6	2		–	–	1–3	—

Updated to match(es) played on 11 December 2024. Source: Women's League Cup
Rules for classification: 1) Points; 2) Goal difference; 3) Number of goals scored; 4) Number of wins; 5) Head-to-head record

== Squad statistics ==
=== Appearances ===
As of match played 10 May 2025

Starting appearances are listed first, followed by substitute appearances after the + symbol where applicable.

No.	Pos	Nat	Player	Total		WSL		FA Cup		League Cup	
No.	Pos	Nat	Player	Apps	Goals	Apps	Goals	Apps	Goals	Apps	Goals
1	GK	(Germany) GER	Janina Leitzig	22	0	20	0	1	0	1	0
2	DF	(Australia) AUS	Courtney Nevin	17	0	8+5	0	1+1	0	2	0
3	DF	(England) ENG	Sam Tierney	21	1	16+2	1	1+1	0	1	0
4	DF	(New Zealand) NZL	CJ Bott	20	1	14+3	0	1	0	2	1
5	DF	(Scotland) SCO	Sophie Howard	22	0	21	0	1	0	0	0
6	MF	(Japan) JPN	Saori Takarada	26	1	8+14	1	1	0	3	0
7	FW	(Canada) CAN	Deanne Rose	17	0	3+11	0	0	0	2+1	0
8	FW	(Finland) FIN	Jutta Rantala	4	1	3	1	0	0	0+1	0
9	FW	(Germany) GER	Lena Petermann	0	0	0	0	0	0	0	0
10	FW	(France) FRA	Noémie Mouchon	4	0	3	0	0	0	0+1	0
11	MF	(Belgium) BEL	Janice Cayman	26	4	20+2	4	1+1	0	2	0
12	DF	(England) ENG	Asmita Ale	23	0	15+3	0	2	0	2+1	0
13	GK	(Wales) WAL	Olivia Clark	1	0	0	0	1	0	0	0
14	FW	(Iceland) ISL	Hlín Eiríksdóttir	9	0	3+5	0	1	0	0	0
17	DF	(France) FRA	Julie Thibaud	23	1	16+4	1	0	0	2+1	0
19	FW	(England) ENG	Denny Draper	0	0	0	0	0	0	0	0
20	FW	(England) ENG	Missy Goodwin	24	3	14+5	2	1+1	1	3	0
21	FW	(Wales) WAL	Hannah Cain	20	4	12+4	3	2	0	1+1	1
22	DF	(Belgium) BEL	Sari Kees	10	0	6	0	2	0	2	0
25	FW	(Colombia) COL	Karla Torres	3	0	0+3	0	0	0	0	0
27	MF	(England) ENG	Shannon O'Brien	14	3	7+6	3	0+1	0	0	0
28	FW	(France) FRA	Shana Chossenotte	21	1	12+6	0	1	0	0+2	1
29	FW	(Japan) JPN	Yūka Momiki	26	6	17+5	3	2	2	2	1
30	MF	(England) ENG	Ruby Mace	20	0	15	0	2	0	1+2	0
31	DF	(Jamaica) JAM	Chantelle Swaby	9	0	6	0	1	0	2	0
39	GK	(England) ENG	Rebekah Dowsett	0	0	0	0	0	0	0	0
47	DF	(England) ENG	Simone Sherwood	6	1	0+3	0	0+2	0	1	1
49	MF	(Wales) WAL	Ffion Bowen	0	0	0	0	0	0	0	0
53	DF	(England) ENG	Nelly Las	17	2	1+11	0	0+2	2	1+2	0
55	MF	(England) ENG	Poppy Groves	0	0	0	0	0	0	0	0
57	FW	(England) ENG	Sammy Kaczmar	2	0	0+1	0	0+1	0	0	0
Players away from the club on loan:
18	MF	(Sweden) SWE	Emilia Pelgander	7	0	0+5	0	0	0	1+1	0
Players who appeared for the club but left during the season:
23	GK	(Netherlands) NED	Lize Kop	4	0	2	0	0	0	2	0
