= 2023–24 Leicester City W.F.C. season =

Leicester City
2023–24 season
- Head coach: Willie Kirk (suspended from 8 March, sacked on 28 March); Jennifer Foster (interim, from 8 March)
- Stadium: King Power Stadium, Leicester
- WSL: 10th
- FA Cup: Semi-finals
- League Cup: Group stage
- Top goalscorer: League: Jutta Rantala (6); All: Jutta Rantala (10)
- Highest home attendance: 5,211 (vs. Manchester United, 28 April)
- Lowest home attendance: 1,064 (vs. Aston Villa, 19 January)
- Average home league attendance: 2,656
Home colours	Away colours	Third colours

The 2023–24 Leicester City W.F.C. season was the club's 20th season of existence and their third season in the Women's Super League, the highest level of the football pyramid. Along with competing in the WSL, the club also contested two domestic cup competitions: the FA Cup and the League Cup.

On 8 March 2024, manager Willie Kirk was suspended pending an internal investigation over allegations of a relationship with one of the club's players. Assistant manager Jennifer Foster was placed in interim charge. Kirk's permanent dismissal was confirmed on 28 March.

== Squad ==
As of 1 February 2024

Note: Flags indicate national team as defined under FIFA eligibility rules; some limited exceptions apply. Players may hold more than one non-FIFA nationality.

No.	Pos.	Nation	Player
1	GK	GER	Janina Leitzig
2	DF	AUS	Courtney Nevin
3	MF	ENG	Sam Tierney
4	DF	NZL	C. J. Bott
5	DF	SCO	Sophie Howard
6	MF	ENG	Aimee Palmer
7	FW	CAN	Deanne Rose
8	FW	FIN	Jutta Rantala
9	FW	GER	Lena Petermann
10	FW	ENG	Aileen Whelan (captain)
11	MF	BEL	Janice Cayman
12	DF	ENG	Asmita Ale (on loan from Tottenham Hotspur)
14	MF	WAL	Josie Green

No.	Pos.	Nation	Player
15	MF	JPN	Saori Takarada
17	DF	FRA	Julie Thibaud
18	MF	SWE	Emilia Pelgander
19	FW	AUS	Remy Siemsen
20	FW	ENG	Missy Goodwin
21	FW	WAL	Hannah Cain
23	GK	NED	Lize Kop
27	MF	ENG	Shannon O'Brien
29	FW	JPN	Yuka Momiki
32	MF	ENG	Ava Baker
47	DF	ENG	Simone Sherwood
49	FW	ENG	Denny Draper

=== Out on loan ===
Note: Flags indicate national team as defined under FIFA eligibility rules; some limited exceptions apply. Players may hold more than one non-FIFA nationality.

No.	Pos.	Nation	Player
13	MF	ENG	Monique Robinson (at Burnley until end of season)
38	GK	ENG	Holly Mears (dual registration with Nottingham Forest until end of season)
41	DF	ENG	Jess Reavill (dual registration with West Bromwich Albion until end of season)
—	GK	ENG	Demi Lambourne (at Crystal Palace until end of season)

== Transfers ==
=== Transfers in ===
Date	Position	Nationality	Name	From	Ref.
4 July 2023	DF	(Australia)	Courtney Nevin	(Sweden) Hammarby	
7 July 2023	GK	(Germany)	Janina Leitzig	(Germany) Bayern Munich	
10 July 2023	FW	(Germany)	Lena Petermann	(France) Montpellier	
11 July 2023	MF	(Belgium)	Janice Cayman	(France) Lyon	
1 August 2023	MF	(England)	Aimee Palmer	(England) Bristol City	
16 August 2023	GK	(Netherlands)	Lize Kop	(Netherlands) Ajax	
25 August 2023	FW	(Finland)	Jutta Rantala	(Sweden) Vittsjö GIK	
31 August 2023	DF	(France)	Julie Thibaud	(France) Bordeaux	
8 September 2023	FW	(Canada)	Deanne Rose	(England) Reading	
1 January 2024	MF	(Japan)	Saori Takarada	(Sweden) Linköping FC	
5 January 2024	FW	(Japan)	Yuka Momiki	(Sweden) Linköping FC	
27 January 2024	MF	(Sweden)	Emilia Pelgander	(Sweden) KIF Örebro DFF	

=== Loans in ===
Date	Position	Nationality	Name	To	Until	Ref.
24 January 2024	DF	(England)	Asmita Ale	(England) Tottenham Hotspur	End of season	

=== Transfers out ===
Date	Position	Nationality	Name	To	Ref.
2 June 2023	GK	(England)	Sophia Poor	(England) Aston Villa	
6 June 2023	DF	(England)	Sophie Barker	(England) Sheffield United	
6 June 2023	FW	(England)	Natasha Flint	(England) Liverpool	
6 June 2023	GK	(England)	Kirstie Levell	(England) Burnley	
6 June 2023	MF	(England)	Charlie Devlin	(England) Birmingham City	
6 June 2023	FW	(Jamaica)	Lachante Paul	(England) Burnley	
6 June 2023	MF	(England)	Molly Pike	(England) Southampton	
6 June 2023	FW	(England)	Jessica Sigsworth	(England) Sheffield United	
6 June 2023	DF	(England)	Abbie McManus	Retired	
6 June 2023	MF	(England)	Connie Scofield	(England) London City Lionesses	
6 June 2023	DF	(England)	Jemma Purfield	(England) Southampton	
6 June 2023	FW	(England)	Ellen Jones	(England) Sunderland	
6 June 2023	DF	(England)	Georgia Eaton-Collins	(Denmark) HB Køge	
6 June 2023	FW	(England)	Mackenzie Smith	(United States) NC State Wolfpack	
7 July 2023	DF	(United States)	Erin Simon	Retired	
13 July 2023	DF	(Nigeria)	Ashleigh Plumptre	(Saudi Arabia) Al-Ittihad	

=== Loans out ===
Date	Position	Nationality	Name	To	Until	Ref.
28 September 2023	GK	(England)	Demi Lambourne	(England) Crystal Palace	End of season	
3 January 2024	DF	(England)	Jess Reavill (Note: Dual registration)	(England) West Bromwich Albion	End of season	
15 January 2024	GK	(England)	Holly Mears	(England) Nottingham Forest	End of season	
1 February 2024	MF	(England)	Monique Robinson	(England) Burnley	End of season	

== Preseason ==
9 September 2023 Friendly	Leicester City	3–2	Everton	Leicester
	Petermann 5'; O'Brien 33'; Tierney 58'	Report	Snoeijs 60'; Piemonte 83'	Stadium: Belvoir Drive; Attendance: Behind-closed-doors

17 September 2023 Friendly	Leicester City	1–3	Liverpool	Leicester
	Whelan 90+1' (pen.)	Report	Holland 12'; Flint 53'; Kearns 84'	Stadium: Belvoir Drive; Attendance: Behind-closed-doors

== Women's Super League ==
=== Results summary ===
Overall								Home						Away					
Pld	W	D	L	GF	GA	GD	Pts	W	D	L	GF	GA	GD	W	D	L	GF	GA	GD
22	4	6	12	26	45	−19	18	2	2	7	12	24	−12	2	4	5	14	21	−7

Last updated: 18 May 2024.
Source: WSL

=== Results by matchday ===
Round	1	2	3	4	5	6	7	8	9	10	11	12	13	14	15	16	17	18	19	20	21	22
Ground	A	H	A	H	A	H	H	A	A	H	H	A	A	H	H	A	H	A	A	H	A	H
Result	W	W	D	L	L	L	D	L	D	D	L	W	L	W	L	L	L	D	L	L	D	L
Position	1	1	2	5	7	7	7	7	8	8	10	7	7	7	7	8	9	9	10	10	10	10

A = Away; H = Home; W = Win; D = Draw; L = Loss

=== Results ===
1 October 2023 1	Bristol City	2–4	Leicester City	Bristol
14:00	Jones 33'; Thestrup 85' (pen.)	Report	Palmer 45+2'; Rantala 49', 83'; Petermann 52'; Cain (yellow card) 78'; Green (yellow card) 90'	Stadium: Ashton Gate; Attendance: 4,132; Referee: Elizabeth Simms

8 October 2023 2	Leicester City	1–0	Everton	Leicester
15:00	Green (yellow card) 45+1'; Petermann 69'	Report	Hope (yellow card) 22'; Vanhaevermaet (yellow card) 60'	Stadium: King Power Stadium; Attendance: 2,150; Referee: Stacey Fullicks

15 October 2023 3	Manchester United	1–1	Leicester City	Leigh
12:00	Zelem (yellow card) 58'; Le Tissier 67'	Report	Nevin (yellow card) 42'; Petermann (yellow card) 51'; Bott (yellow card) 52'; Cain (yellow card) 55'; Whelan 60'; Tierney (yellow card) 72'	Stadium: Leigh Sports Village; Attendance: 4,903; Referee: Adewunmi Soneye

21 October 2023 4	Leicester City	0–1	Manchester City	Leicester
17:15	O'Brien (yellow card) 85'	Report	Kelly 10'; Angeldal (yellow card) 90'	Stadium: King Power Stadium; Attendance: 2,447; Referee: Farai Hallam

5 November 2023 5	Liverpool	2–1	Leicester City	Birkenhead
14:00	Lawley 48'; Nagano (yellow card) 60'; Höbinger 84'; van de Sanden (yellow card) 90+7'; Enderby (yellow card) 90+8'	Report	Goodwin 57'; Thibaud (yellow card) 89'	Stadium: Prenton Park; Attendance: 1,783; Referee: Phoebe Cross

12 November 2023 6	Leicester City	2–6	Arsenal	Leicester
18:45	Tierney 36', (yellow card) 61'; Cayman 38', (yellow card) 45+4'	Report	Lacasse (yellow card) 45+6', (goal) 49'; Russo 52'; Foord 58'; Pelova 61'; Blackstenius 75'; Hurtig 90+8'	Stadium: King Power Stadium; Attendance: 4,179; Referee: Stacey Fullicks

19 November 2023 7	Leicester City	1–1	Tottenham Hotspur	Leicester
15:00	Cayman 18'	Report	Bizet 56'; James (yellow card) 74'	Stadium: King Power Stadium; Attendance: 1,953; Referee: Andy Madley

26 November 2023 8	Chelsea	5–2	Leicester City	Kingston upon Thames
14:00	James 2', 58'; Nevin 5' (o.g.); Kerr 40'; Beever-Jones 88'	Report	Rantala 26'; Howard (yellow card) 33'; Tierney 44'; Petermann (yellow card) 48'; Thibaud (yellow card) 75'	Stadium: Kingsmeadow; Attendance: 2,558; Referee: Marc Wilson

10 December 2023 9	Brighton & Hove Albion	2–2	Leicester City	Crawley
14:00	Losada (yellow card) 65'; Terland (yellow card) 71', (goal) 82', 88'	Report	Green (yellow card) 17'; Petermann 45'; Rantala 46'; Whelan (yellow card) 90+1'	Stadium: Broadfield Stadium; Attendance: 1,954; Referee: Melissa Burgin

17 December 2023 10	Leicester City	1–1	West Ham United	Leicester
15:00	Palmer (yellow card) 28'; Petermann 68'; Green (yellow card) 90+1'	Report	Ziu (yellow card) 35'; Stringer (yellow card) 79'; Cissoko (yellow card) 90+3' (yellow-red card) 90+5'; Hayashi 90+8'	Stadium: King Power Stadium; Attendance: 1,521; Referee: Abigail Byrne

19 January 2024 11	Leicester City	0–1	Aston Villa	Burton upon Trent
19:00	Nevin (yellow card) 28'	Report	Daly 16'; Pacheco (yellow card) 90+9'	Stadium: Pirelli Stadium; Attendance: 1,064; Referee: Elizabeth Simms

28 January 2024 12	Everton	0–1	Leicester City	Liverpool
12:30		Report	Green (yellow card) 12'; O'Brien (yellow card) 29'; Cayman 53'	Stadium: Walton Hall Park; Attendance: 891; Referee: Cheryl Foster

4 February 2024 13	Manchester City	2–0	Leicester City	Manchester
13:00	Hemp 82'; Kelly 85'	Report	Nevin (yellow card) 9'; Takarada (yellow card) 26'; O'Brien (yellow card) 57'; Howard (yellow card) 66'	Stadium: Academy Stadium; Attendance: 3,383; Referee: Lisa Benn

18 February 2024 14	Leicester City	5–2	Bristol City	Leicester
15:00	Momiki 33'; Takarada 45+1'; Cayman 54'; Rantala 76', (yellow card) 81'; Draper 89'	Report	Morgan 20'; Powell (yellow card) 24'; Thestrup 49'; Napier (yellow card) 63'	Stadium: King Power Stadium; Attendance: 2,219; Referee: Stacey Pearson

3 March 2024 15	Leicester City	0–4	Chelsea	Leicester
18:00	Momiki (yellow card) 80'	Report	Björn 38'; Ramírez 44'; Kaneryd 64'; Macario 78'	Stadium: King Power Stadium; Attendance: 3,101; Referee: Phoebe Cross

17 March 2024 16	Tottenham Hotspur	1–0	Leicester City	Leyton
14:00	Vinberg 2'; Bizet (yellow card) 45+4'; Neville (yellow card) 63'; Petzelberger (yellow card) 83'	Report	Cayman (yellow card) 73'; Pelgander (yellow card) 88'	Stadium: Brisbane Road; Attendance: 1,507; Referee: Adewunmi Soneye

24 March 2024 17	Leicester City	2–3	Brighton & Hove Albion	Leicester
15:00	Rantala 54'; Petermann 84'	Report	Terland (yellow card) 31', (goal) 85'; Haley 62'; Losada (yellow card) 64'; Robinson 68'; Lee (yellow card) 72'; Olme (yellow card) 77'	Stadium: King Power Stadium; Attendance: 2,714; Referee: Cheryl Foster

30 March 2024 18	Aston Villa	2–2	Leicester City	Walsall
12:30	Corsie (yellow card) 16'; Lehmann (yellow card) 24'; Leon 26'; Nobbs (yellow card) 55'; Daly 75'	Report	Momiki 28'; Tierney 56'; Pelgander (yellow card) 87'	Stadium: Bescot Stadium; Attendance: 2,182; Referee: Elizabeth Simms

21 April 2024 19	Arsenal	3–0	Leicester City	Holloway
14:00	Mead 28', 78'; Pelova (yellow card) 30'; Little (yellow card) 50'; Russo 75'	Report		Stadium: Emirates Stadium; Attendance: 42,820; Referee: Adewunmi Soneye

28 April 2024 20	Leicester City	0–1	Manchester United	Leicester
15:00	Bott (yellow card) 90+13'	Report	Toone 83'	Stadium: King Power Stadium; Attendance: 5,211; Referee: Megan Wilson

5 May 2024 21	West Ham United	1–1	Leicester City	Dagenham
15:00	Ueki 13'; Tysiak (yellow card) 90+5'	Report	Howard 36'; Ale (yellow card) 47'; Thibaud (yellow card) 87'	Stadium: Victoria Road; Attendance: 1,904; Referee: Abigail Byrne

18 May 2024 22	Leicester City	0–4	Liverpool	Leicester
15:00		Report	Haug 7'; Clark (yellow card) 44'; Kiernan 66', 83', 90+4'	Stadium: King Power Stadium; Referee: Constantine Hatzidakis

=== League table ===
Pos	Team	Pld	W	D	L	GF	GA	GD	Pts	Qualification or relegation
8	Everton	22	6	5	11	24	37	−13	23	
9	Brighton & Hove Albion	22	5	4	13	26	48	−22	19	
10	Leicester City	22	4	6	12	26	45	−19	18	
11	West Ham United	22	3	6	13	20	45	−25	15	
12	Bristol City (R)	22	1	3	18	20	70	−50	6	Relegation to the Championship

Source: Women's Super League Table
Rules for classification: 1) Points; 2) Goal difference; 3) Number of goals scored.
(R) Relegated

== Women's FA Cup ==
As a member of the first tier, Leicester entered the FA Cup in the fourth round proper.

14 January 2024 Fourth round	Derby County	0–4	Leicester City	Mickleover
14:00	Wilson (yellow card) 75'	Report	Petermann 27'; Cayman 57'; Rose 69'; Steggles 75' (o.g.)	Stadium: Don Amott Arena; Attendance: 911; Referee: Phoebe Cross

10 February 2024 Fifth round	Leicester City	6–2	Birmingham City	Burton upon Trent
12:00	Cayman 19'; O'Brien 23', 42'; Takarada 59'; Rose 66'; Whelan 82'	Report	Goodwin 2' (o.g.); Lawley (yellow card) 21'; Smith 41', (yellow card) 54'	Stadium: Pirelli Stadium; Attendance: 609; Referee: Megan Wilson

9 March 2024 Quarter-final	Liverpool	0–2	Leicester City	Birkenhead
12:00		Report	Rantala 15', 63'	Stadium: Prenton Park; Referee: Melissa Burgin

14 April 2024 Semi-final	Tottenham Hotspur	2–1 (a.e.t.)	Leicester City	London
12:00	Turner (yellow card) 19'; Summanen (yellow card) 64'; Naz 83'; Thomas 118'	Report	Rantala 12'; Momiki (yellow card) 32'; Green (yellow card) 43'; Bott (yellow card) 90+6'	Stadium: Tottenham Hotspur Stadium; Attendance: 18,078; Referee: Emily Heaslip

== FA Women's League Cup ==
11 October 2023 Group Stage	Leicester City	2–1	Liverpool	Burton upon Trent
19:00	Palmer 34', (yellow card) 42'; Cain 50'; Tierney (yellow card) 69'; O'Brien (yellow card) 90+5'	Report	Lundgaard (yellow card) 34'; Flint 45+3'; Taylor (yellow card) 90+6'	Stadium: Pirelli Stadium; Attendance: 485; Referee: Lisa Benn

22 November 2023 Group Stage	Manchester City	2–2 (3–4 p)	Leicester City	Manchester
19:00	Castellanos 49'; Fowler (yellow card) 51'; Coombs 70'	Report	Palmer (yellow card) 24'; Cayman 41', (yellow card) 60'; Howard 44'; Green (yellow card) 76'	Stadium: Academy Stadium; Attendance: 1,358; Referee: James Bell
	Penalties
	Greenwood (penalty scored); Fowler (penalty missed); Castellanos (penalty missed); Hasegawa (penalty scored); Roord (penalty scored); Houghton (penalty missed)		(penalty scored) Rantala; (penalty missed) Petermann; (penalty scored) Whelan; (penalty missed) Cayman; (penalty scored) Cain; (penalty scored) Howard

14 December 2023 Group Stage	Manchester United	3–1	Leicester City	Leigh
19:00	García 2'; Naalsund 20'; Zelem 65' (pen.); Toone (yellow card) 68'	Report	Whelan 26'; Petermann (yellow card) 90+1'	Stadium: Leigh Sports Village; Attendance: 2,068; Referee: Phoebe Cross

24 January 2024 Group Stage	Leicester City	5–1	Everton	Leicester
19:00	Tierney 18'; Rose 20'; O'Brien 28' (pen.); Goodwin 48'; Rantala 82'	Report	Galli (yellow card) 41'; Bissell (yellow card) 42'; Wilding (yellow card) 61'; Bennison 90+6'	Stadium: King Power Stadium; Attendance: 231; Referee: Megan Wilson

Pos	Team	Pld	W	PW	PL	L	GF	GA	GD	Pts	Qualification	MCI	MUN	LEI	LIV	EVE
1	Manchester City (Q)	4	3	0	1	0	10	7	+3	10	Advanced to knock-out stage	—	2–1	2–2	–	–
2	Manchester United	4	3	0	0	1	12	3	+9	9	Possible knock-out stage based on ranking	–	—	3–1	–	7–0
3	Leicester City	4	2	1	0	1	10	7	+3	8		–	–	—	2–1	5–1
4	Liverpool	4	1	0	0	3	6	8	−2	3		3–4	0–1	–	—	–
5	Everton	4	0	0	0	4	3	16	−13	0		1–2	–	–	1–2	—

Source: FA Women's League Cup
Rules for classification: 1) Points; 2) Goal difference; 3) Number of goals scored; 4) Number of wins; 5) Head-to-head record
(Q) Qualified to the phase indicated

== Squad statistics ==
=== Appearances ===
As of match played 18 May 2024

Starting appearances are listed first, followed by substitute appearances after the + symbol where applicable.

No.	Pos	Nat	Player	Total		WSL		FA Cup		League Cup	
No.	Pos	Nat	Player	Apps	Goals	Apps	Goals	Apps	Goals	Apps	Goals
1	GK	(Germany) GER	Janina Leitzig	18	0	14	0	1	0	2+1	0
2	DF	(Australia) AUS	Courtney Nevin	22	1	13+3	1	1+1	0	3+1	0
3	DF	(England) ENG	Sam Tierney	30	4	22	3	4	0	4	1
4	DF	(New Zealand) NZL	CJ Bott	26	0	14+6	0	3	0	2+1	0
5	DF	(Scotland) SCO	Sophie Howard	29	2	19+3	1	4	0	3	1
6	MF	(England) ENG	Aimee Palmer	11	2	4+3	1	0+2	0	2	1
7	FW	(Canada) CAN	Deanne Rose	20	3	4+11	0	1+2	2	2	1
8	FW	(Finland) FIN	Jutta Rantala	30	10	20+2	6	4	3	0+4	1
9	FW	(Germany) GER	Lena Petermann	26	5	18+2	4	2+1	1	0+3	0
10	FW	(England) ENG	Aileen Whelan	26	3	11+8	1	1+2	1	4	1
11	MF	(Belgium) BEL	Janice Cayman	29	7	20+1	4	4	2	3+1	1
12	DF	(England) ENG	Asmita Ale	8	0	4+2	0	0+2	0	0	0
14	MF	(Wales) WAL	Josie Green	24	0	11+5	0	3+1	0	4	0
15	MF	(Japan) JPN	Saori Takarada	17	2	11+1	1	4	1	1	0
17	DF	(France) FRA	Julie Thibaud	26	0	17+3	0	2+1	0	3	0
18	MF	(Sweden) SWE	Emilia Pelgander	10	0	1+6	0	1+2	0	0	0
19	FW	(Australia) AUS	Remy Siemsen	10	0	0+6	0	0+1	0	2+1	0
20	FW	(England) ENG	Missy Goodwin	23	2	8+9	1	2	0	3+1	1
21	FW	(Wales) WAL	Hannah Cain	10	1	4+4	0	0	0	1+1	1
23	GK	(Netherlands) NED	Lize Kop	13	0	8	0	3	0	2	0
27	MF	(England) ENG	Shannon O'Brien	14	3	8+1	0	2+1	2	1+1	1
29	FW	(Japan) JPN	Yuka Momiki	17	2	11+1	2	2+2	0	1	0
32	MF	(England) ENG	Ava Baker	11	0	0+8	0	0+1	0	1+1	0
47	MF	(England) ENG	Simone Sherwood	1	0	0	0	0	0	0+1	0
49	FW	(England) ENG	Denny Draper	4	1	0+4	1	0	0	0	0
