= 2022–23 Leicester City W.F.C. season =

Leicester City
2022–23 season
- Head coach: Lydia Bedford (until 3 November); Willie Kirk (from 3 November)
- Stadium: King Power Stadium, Leicester; Pirelli Stadium, Burton upon Trent
- Women's Super League: 10th
- FA Cup: Fourth round
- League Cup: Group stage
- Top goalscorer: League: Hannah Cain, Carrie Jones and Sam Tierney (2); All: Sam Tierney (4)
- Highest home attendance: 4,162 (vs. Liverpool, 29 April)
- Lowest home attendance: 1,237 (vs. Everton, 12 March)
- Average home league attendance: 3,027
Home colours	Away colours	Third colours

The 2022–23 Leicester City W.F.C. season was the club's 19th season of existence and their second season in the Women's Super League, the highest level of the football pyramid. Along with competing in the WSL, the club also contested two domestic cup competitions: the FA Cup and the League Cup.

On 3 November 2022, Leicester sacked manager Lydia Bedford after 332 days in charge and promoted Willie Kirk to the role. He had joined the club as Director of Women's and Girls' Football in July 2022.

== Squad ==
As of 28 January 2023

Note: Flags indicate national team as defined under FIFA eligibility rules; some limited exceptions apply. Players may hold more than one non-FIFA nationality.

No.	Pos.	Nation	Player
1	GK	ENG	Demi Lambourne
2	DF	AUS	Courtney Nevin (on loan from Hammarby)
3	DF	ENG	Sam Tierney
4	DF	NZL	CJ Bott
5	DF	ENG	Abbie McManus
6	DF	ENG	Georgia Eaton-Collins
8	MF	ENG	Molly Pike
9	FW	ENG	Jessica Sigsworth
10	FW	ENG	Aileen Whelan (captain)
11	FW	ENG	Lachante Paul
13	DF	USA	Erin Simon
14	MF	WAL	Josie Green
15	DF	SCO	Sophie Howard
16	MF	WAL	Carrie Jones (on loan from Manchester United)

No.	Pos.	Nation	Player
19	FW	AUS	Remy Siemsen
20	FW	ENG	Missy Goodwin
21	FW	WAL	Hannah Cain
22	DF	NGR	Ashleigh Plumptre
23	DF	ENG	Jemma Purfield
27	MF	ENG	Shannon O'Brien
28	GK	ENG	Kirstie Levell
30	MF	ENG	Ruby Mace (on loan from Manchester City)
32	MF	ENG	Ava Baker
33	GK	GER	Janina Leitzig (on loan from Bayern Munich)
34	FW	ENG	Mackenzie Smith
35	GK	ENG	Sophia Poor
40	MF	ENG	Monique Robinson
41	MF	ENG	Jess Reavill

== Preseason ==
27 July 2022 Friendly	Leicester City	0–1	(Belgium) OH Leuven	Leicester
		Report	Eurlings 11'	Stadium: Belvoir Drive; Attendance: Behind-closed-doors

30 July 2022 Friendly	Leicester City	0–1	Bristol City	Leicester
14:00		Report	Morgan 64'	Stadium: Belvoir Drive; Attendance: Behind-closed-doors

14 August 2022 Friendly	Leicester City	1–0	Southampton	Leicester
12:00	Tierney 49'	Report		Stadium: Belvoir Drive; Attendance: Behind-closed-doors

20 August 2022 Friendly	Leicester City	3–1	Reading	Leicester
	Bott; Brougham; Flint	Report	Rowe	Stadium: Belvoir Drive; Attendance: Behind-closed-doors

27 August 2022 Friendly	Leicester City	1–2	Brighton & Hove Albion	Leicester
	Howard	Report	Robinson; Connolly	Stadium: Belvoir Drive; Attendance: Behind-closed-doors

== Women's Super League ==
=== Results summary ===
Overall								Home						Away					
Pld	W	D	L	GF	GA	GD	Pts	W	D	L	GF	GA	GD	W	D	L	GF	GA	GD
22	5	1	16	15	48	−33	16	3	1	7	11	18	−7	2	0	9	4	30	−26

Last updated: 27 May 2023.
Source: Barclays WSL

=== Results by matchday ===
Round	1	2	3	4	5	6	7	8	9	10	11	12	13	14	15	16	17	18	19	20	21	22
Ground	H	H	A	A	H	A	H	A	H	H	H	A	A	H	A	A	H	H	A	A	H	A
Result	L	L	L	L	L	L	L	L	L	W	L	W	L	D	L	L	W	W	L	L	L	W
Position	9	11	11	12	12	12	12	12	12	12	12	12	12	12	12	12	11	10	11	11	11	10

A = Away; H = Home; W = Win; D = Draw; L = Loss

=== Results ===
11 September 2022	Everton	P–P	Leicester City	Liverpool
13:00				Stadium: Walton Hall Park
Note: The FA postponed all of the weekend's football fixtures following the death of Elizabeth II on 8 September 2022.

18 September 2022 1	Leicester City	1–2	Tottenham Hotspur	Leicester
15:00	Spence 58' (o.g.); O'Brien (yellow card) 79'	Report	Neville 35', (yellow card) 85'; Spence 45+2'	Stadium: King Power Stadium; Attendance: 2,868; Referee: Kirsty Dowle

25 September 2022 2	Leicester City	0–2	Aston Villa	Leicester
15:00		Report	Daly 3' (pen.); Lehmann (yellow card) 16'; Gielnik 86'	Stadium: King Power Stadium; Attendance: 2,713; Referee: Thomas Parsons

29 September 2022 3	Everton	1–0	Leicester City	Liverpool
18:30	Graham (yellow card) 38'; Björn (yellow card) 52'; Levell 90+4' (o.g.)	Report	O'Brien (yellow card) 70'; Plumptre (yellow card) 81'; Pike (yellow card) 88'	Stadium: Walton Hall Park; Attendance: 724; Referee: Cheryl Foster
Note: Rescheduled from 11 September 2022.

16 October 2022 4	Manchester City	4–0	Leicester City	Manchester
14:00	Shaw 24', 79'; Greenwood (yellow card) 42'; Hemp 72'; Hasegawa 88'	Report	O'Brien (yellow card) 39'	Stadium: Academy Stadium; Attendance: 2,553; Referee: Farai Hallam

23 October 2022 5	Leicester City	0–1	Manchester United	Leicester
15:00	Howard (yellow card) 7'; Plumptre (yellow card) 24'	Report	Parris 34'; Zelem (yellow card) 58'; Toone (yellow card) 90+5'	Stadium: King Power Stadium; Attendance: 4,007; Referee: Neil Hair

30 October 2022 6	Reading	2–1	Leicester City	Reading
14:00	Bryson (yellow card) 45+2'; Rowe (yellow card) 60', (goal) 90', 90+2'; Eikeland (yellow card) 75'	Report	Simon (yellow card) 31'; O'Brien (yellow card) 33'; Flint 36'	Stadium: Madejski Stadium; Attendance: 1,559; Referee: Emily Heaslip

6 November 2022 7	Leicester City	0–4	Arsenal	Leicester
14:00	Bott (yellow card) 43'	Report	Maanum 13'; Foord 22'; Catley 37'; Blackstenius 48'	Stadium: King Power Stadium; Attendance: 3,590; Referee: Amy Fearn

20 November 2022 8	West Ham United	1–0	Leicester City	Dagenham
15:00	Walker (yellow card) 46'; Asseyi (yellow card) 56'; Atkinson 88'	Report		Stadium: Victoria Road; Attendance: 1,038; Referee: Louise Saunders

3 December 2022 9	Leicester City	0–8	Chelsea	Leicester
15:00	Tierney (yellow card)	Report	Reiten 4'; Fleming 13', 50'; Kirby 39', 82'; Charles 41'; Kerr 45'; England 75'	Stadium: King Power Stadium; Attendance: 3,023; Referee: Amy Fearn

11 December 2022	Liverpool	P–P	Leicester City	Birkenhead
14:00				Stadium: Prenton Park
Note: Postponed due to frozen pitch.

15 January 2023 10	Leicester City	3–0	Brighton & Hove Albion	Leicester
15:00	Whelan 45'; Tierney 48'; Robinson 69'; Baker (yellow card) 74'	Report		Stadium: King Power Stadium; Attendance: 2,329; Referee: Cheryl Foster

22 January 2023	Tottenham Hotspur	P–P	Leicester City	Leyton
14:00				Stadium: Brisbane Road
Note: Postponed due to frozen pitch.

4 February 2023 11	Leicester City	0–2	Manchester City	Leicester
11:30	Plumptre (yellow card) 52'	Report	Shaw 61'; Kelly 74'	Stadium: King Power Stadium; Attendance: 2,815; Referee: Amy Fearn

12 February 2023 12	Liverpool	0–1	Leicester City	Birkenhead
14:00	Lawley (yellow card) 83'	Report	Cain 8'; Tierney (yellow card) 72'; Mace (yellow card) 83'; Bott (yellow card) 90+2'	Stadium: Prenton Park; Attendance: 1,818; Referee: Richie Watkins
Note: Rescheduled from 11 December 2022.

5 March 2023 13	Manchester United	5–1	Leicester City	Leigh
12:30	Russo 15', 36', 53'; Galton 64'; García 84'	Report	Whelan (yellow card) 24'; Siemsen 48'; Tierney (yellow card) 69'; Nevin (yellow card) 82'	Stadium: Leigh Sports Village; Attendance: 3,623; Referee: Melissa Burgin

12 March 2023 14	Leicester City	0–0	Everton	Leicester
15:00	Green (yellow card) 15'; Mace (yellow card) 90+3'	Report		Stadium: King Power Stadium; Attendance: 1,237; Referee: Stacey Fullicks

15 March 2023 15	Tottenham Hotspur	1–0	Leicester City	Leyton
19:00	Bartrip (yellow card) 37'; England 65'	Report		Stadium: Brisbane Road; Attendance: 305; Referee: Yoshimi Yamashita
Note: Rescheduled from 22 January 2023.

26 March 2023 16	Aston Villa	5–0	Leicester City	Aston
14:00	Dali 6'; Lehmann 35', 71'; Daly 45', 55'	Report		Stadium: Villa Park; Attendance: 6,489; Referee: Jane Simms

2 April 2023 17	Leicester City	2–1	Reading	Leicester
15:00	Tierney 20', (yellow card) 74'; Mace (yellow card) 45+5'; Jones 90+6'	Report	Woodham (yellow card) 41'; Wellings 45'; Bryson (yellow card) 66'	Stadium: King Power Stadium; Attendance: 2,527; Referee: Richie Watkins

23 April 2023	Chelsea	P–P	Leicester City	Kingston upon Thames
				Stadium: Kingsmeadow
Note: Postponed due to Chelsea's participation in the UEFA Women's Champions League

29 April 2023 18	Leicester City	4–0	Liverpool	Leicester
12:30	Green 15'; Jones 21', (yellow card) 40'; Plumptre 48'; Goodwin 90+6'	Report		Stadium: King Power Stadium; Attendance: 4,162; Referee: Emily Heaslip

5 May 2023 19	Arsenal	1–0	Leicester City	Borehamwood
19:30	Maanum 64', (yellow card) 90+7'	Report	Plumptre (yellow card) 48'; Bott (yellow card) 90+8'	Stadium: Meadow Park; Attendance: 3,982; Referee: Emily Heaslip

10 May 2023 20	Chelsea	6–0	Leicester City	Kingston upon Thames
19:00	Reiten 8'; Cuthbert 18'; Harder 32', 42'; James 56'; Fleming (yellow card) 72'; Čanković 90+3'	Report	Cain (yellow card) 73'	Stadium: Kingsmeadow; Attendance: 1,308; Referee: Rebecca Welch

21 May 2023 21	Leicester City	1–2	West Ham United	Leicester
15:00	Mace (yellow card) 39' (yellow-red card) 90+4'; Cain 90+9' (pen.)	Report	Howard 18' (o.g.); Parker (yellow card) 45+7'; Brynjarsdóttir 60' (pen.); Fisk (yellow card) 71'; Longhurst (yellow card) 86'	Stadium: King Power Stadium; Attendance: 4,023; Referee: Lisa Benn

27 May 2023 22	Brighton & Hove Albion	0–1	Leicester City	Crawley
14:30	Lee (yellow card) 31'; Symonds (yellow card) 64'	Report	Bott (yellow card) 27'; Baker 73'	Stadium: Broadfield Stadium; Attendance: 3,073; Referee: Abigail Byrne

=== League table ===
Pos	Team	Pld	W	D	L	GF	GA	GD	Pts	Qualification or relegation
8	West Ham United	22	6	3	13	23	44	−21	21	
9	Tottenham Hotspur	22	5	3	14	31	47	−16	18	
10	Leicester City	22	5	1	16	15	48	−33	16	
11	Brighton & Hove Albion	22	4	4	14	26	63	−37	16	
12	Reading (R)	22	3	2	17	23	57	−34	11	Relegation to the Championship

Source: Women's Super League
Rules for classification: 1) Points; 2) Goal difference; 3) Number of goals scored.
(R) Relegated

== Women's FA Cup ==
As a member of the first tier, Leicester City entered the FA Cup in the fourth round proper.

29 January 2023 Fourth round	Leicester City	2–2 (2–3 p)	Reading	Burton upon Trent
16:00	Tierney 29'; Howard (yellow card) 87'; Cain 92'; Nevin (yellow card) 105+1'	Report	Troelsgaard 5', (yellow card) 29'; Moore (yellow card) 74'; Primmer (yellow card) 91'; Mukandi 102'	Stadium: Pirelli Stadium; Referee: Pearson
	Penalties
	Whelan (penalty scored); Cain (penalty missed); Plumptre (penalty missed); Eaton-Collins (penalty scored); Jones (penalty missed)		(penalty scored) Vanhaevermaet; (penalty scored) Dowie; (penalty scored) Mukandi; (penalty missed) Cooper

== FA Women's League Cup ==
=== Group stage ===
2 October 2022 Group stage	Blackburn Rovers	0–3	Leicester City	Bamber Bridge
14:00		Report	Smith 6'; Scofield 49'; Whelan 65'	Stadium: Sir Tom Finney Stadium

26 October 2022 Group stage	Leicester City	0–4	Liverpool	Burton upon Trent
19:00		Report	Kearns 14'; Roberts 33'; Furness 45+2'; Stengel 72'	Stadium: Pirelli Stadium

8 December 2022 Group stage	Sunderland	P–P	Leicester City	Hetton-le-Hole
19:30				Stadium: Eppleton CW
Note: Postponed due to frozen pitch.

18 December 2022 Group stage	Leicester City	P–P	Manchester City	Burton upon Trent
15:00				Stadium: Pirelli Stadium
Note: Postponed due to frozen pitch.

11 January 2023 Group stage	Sunderland	0–5	Leicester City	Hetton-le-Hole
19:30		Report	Goodwin 45+9'; Robinson (yellow card) 49'; Tierney 70'; Baker 77'; Pike 82', 90+1'	Stadium: Eppleton CW
Note: Rescheduled from 8 December 2022.

18 January 2023 Group stage	Leicester City	0–1	Manchester City	Burton upon Trent
19:00		Report	Angeldahl 90'	Stadium: Pirelli Stadium
Note: Rescheduled from 18 December 2022.

Pos	Team	Pld	W	WPEN	LPEN	L	GF	GA	GD	Pts	Qualification	MCI	LIV	LEI	SUN	BLB
1	Manchester City	4	4	0	0	0	12	0	+12	12	Advanced to knock-out stage	—	–	–	3–0	6–0
2	Liverpool	4	3	0	0	1	6	2	+4	9	Possible knock-out stage based on ranking	0–2	—	–	–	1–0
3	Leicester City	4	2	0	0	2	8	5	+3	6		–	0–4	—	–	–
4	Sunderland	3	0	0	0	3	0	9	−9	0		—	0–1	0–5	—	–
5	Blackburn Rovers	3	0	0	0	3	0	10	−10	0		–	–	0–3	C–C	—

Rules for classification: 1) Points; 2) Goal difference; 3) Number of goals scored; 4) Number of wins; 5) Head-to-head record

== Squad statistics ==
=== Appearances ===
As of 27 May 2023

Starting appearances are listed first, followed by substitute appearances after the + symbol where applicable.

No.	Pos	Nat	Player	Total		WSL		FA Cup		League Cup	
No.	Pos	Nat	Player	Apps	Goals	Apps	Goals	Apps	Goals	Apps	Goals
1	GK	(England) ENG	Demi Lambourne	3	0	2	0	0	0	1	0
2	DF	(Australia) AUS	Courtney Nevin	13	0	12	0	0+1	0	0	0
3	DF	(England) ENG	Sam Tierney	26	4	21	2	1	1	2+2	1
4	DF	(New Zealand) NZL	CJ Bott	23	0	13+6	0	1	0	3	0
5	DF	(England) ENG	Abbie McManus	4	0	2	0	0	0	2	0
6	DF	(England) ENG	Georgia Eaton-Collins	6	0	3+2	0	0+1	0	0	0
8	MF	(England) ENG	Molly Pike	22	2	8+10	0	1	0	2+1	2
9	FW	(England) ENG	Jessica Sigsworth	1	0	0+1	0	0	0	0	0
10	FW	(England) ENG	Aileen Whelan	27	2	22	1	1	0	2+2	1
11	FW	(England) ENG	Lachante Paul	0	0	0	0	0	0	0	0
13	DF	(United States) USA	Erin Simon	15	0	9+2	0	0+1	0	1+2	0
14	MF	(Wales) WAL	Josie Green	16	1	12+3	1	0	0	0+1	0
15	DF	(Scotland) SCO	Sophie Howard	26	0	21	0	1	0	3+1	0
16	FW	(Wales) WAL	Carrie Jones	22	2	15+4	2	0+1	0	0+2	0
19	FW	(Australia) AUS	Remy Siemsen	10	1	7+3	1	0	0	0	0
20	FW	(England) ENG	Missy Goodwin	25	2	8+14	1	1	0	2	1
21	FW	(Wales) WAL	Hannah Cain	17	3	13+1	2	0+1	1	2	0
22	DF	(Nigeria) NGR	Ashleigh Plumptre	24	1	20	1	1	0	3	0
23	DF	(England) ENG	Jemma Purfield	18	0	11+4	0	1	0	2	0
27	MF	(England) ENG	Shannon O'Brien	11	0	4+6	0	0	0	0+1	0
28	GK	(England) ENG	Kirstie Levell	10	0	7	0	0	0	3	0
30	MF	(England) ENG	Ruby Mace	11	0	10	0	1	0	0	0
32	MF	(England) ENG	Ava Baker	14	2	1+8	1	1	0	4	1
33	GK	(Germany) GER	Janina Leitzig	14	0	13	0	1	0	0	0
34	FW	(England) ENG	Mackenzie Smith	8	1	0+4	0	0	0	2+2	1
35	GK	(England) ENG	Sophia Poor	0	0	0	0	0	0	0	0
40	MF	(England) ENG	Monique Robinson	10	1	0+6	1	0	0	3+1	0
41	MF	(England) ENG	Jess Reavill	2	0	1	0	0	0	0+1	0
Players away from the club on loan:
7	FW	(England) ENG	Natasha Flint	11	1	5+4	1	0	0	2	0
12	FW	(Wales) WAL	Ellen Jones	2	0	0	0	0	0	1+1	0
44	MF	(England) ENG	Connie Scofield	4	1	0+2	0	0	0	2	1
Players who appeared for the club but left during the season:
2	DF	(Northern Ireland) NIR	Demi Vance	5	0	1+2	0	0	0	2	0
6	DF	(England) ENG	Georgia Brougham	1	0	1	0	0	0	0	0

== Transfers ==
=== Transfers in ===
Date	Position	Nationality	Name	From	Ref.
7 July 2022	MF	(Wales)	Josie Green	(England) Tottenham Hotspur	
8 July 2022	FW	(England)	Aileen Whelan	(England) Brighton & Hove Albion	
11 July 2022	DF	(United States)	Erin Simon	(United States) Racing Louisville	
8 September 2022	FW	(England)	Ellen Jones	(United States) Colorado Buffaloes	
16 September 2022	DF	(Northern Ireland)	Demi Vance	(Scotland) Rangers	
12 January 2023	FW	(Australia)	Remy Siemsen	(Australia) Sydney FC	
26 January 2023	DF	(England)	Georgia Eaton-Collins	(United States) UCF Knights	

=== Loans in ===
Date	Position	Nationality	Name	From	Until	Ref.
21 July 2022	MF	(Wales)	Carrie Jones	(England) Manchester United	End of season	
13 January 2023	GK	(Germany)	Janina Leitzig	(Germany) Bayern Munich	End of season	
24 January 2023	DF	(Australia)	Courtney Nevin	(Sweden) Hammarby	End of season	
28 January 2023	MF	(England)	Ruby Mace	(England) Manchester City	End of season	

=== Transfers out ===
Date	Position	Nationality	Name	To	Ref.
23 May 2022	FW	(Netherlands)	Esmee de Graaf	(Netherlands) Feyenoord	
23 May 2022	FW	(Jamaica)	Paige Bailey-Gayle	(England) Crystal Palace	
23 May 2022	GK	(England)	Sophie Harris	(England) Southampton	
23 May 2022	FW	(Scotland)	Abbi Grant	(Scotland) Glasgow City	
23 May 2022	MF	(Slovenia)	Luana Zajmi	(Slovenia) Pomurje	
29 July 2022	MF	(England)	Elysia Boddy	(England) Bristol City	
12 January 2023	DF	(Northern Ireland)	Demi Vance	(Northern Ireland) Glentoran	
20 January 2023	DF	(England)	Georgia Brougham	(England) London City Lionesses	

=== Loans out ===
Date	Position	Nationality	Name	To	Until	Ref.
8 July 2022	MF	(England)	Sophie Barker	(England) Sheffield United	End of season	
27 July 2022	FW	(England)	Mackenzie Smith (Note: Dual registration)	(England) Nottingham Forest	End of season	
29 July 2022	MF	(England)	Charlie Devlin	(England) Birmingham City	End of season	
13 January 2023	FW	(England)	Ellen Jones	(England) Coventry United	End of season	
18 January 2023	MF	(England)	Connie Scofield	(England) Coventry United	End of season	
31 January 2023	FW	(England)	Natasha Flint	(Scotland) Celtic	End of season	
25 February 2023	GK	(England)	Demi Lambourne (Note: Emergency goalkeeper loan)	(England) Coventry United	3 March 2023	
