= 2024–25 Women's League Cup =

Tournament details
- Country: England
- Dates: 2 October 2024 – 15 March 2025
- Teams: 23

Final positions
- Champions: Chelsea (3rd title)
- Runners-up: Manchester City

Tournament statistics
- Matches played: 37
- Goals scored: 135 (3.65 per match)
- Attendance: 49,180 (1,329 per match)
- Top goal scorer(s): (England) Maria Edwards; Blackburn Rovers (5 goals)

The 2024–25 Women's League Cup was the 14th edition of the Women's Super League and Women's Championship's league cup competition. All 23 teams from the WSL and Championship took part in the competition. Arsenal were the defending champions. It marked the first time since the competition's inception in 2011 that the cup would not be played under the named sponsorship of Continental AG or under the branding of The Football Association following the completed takeover by Women's Professional Leagues Limited (WPLL). On 16 December 2024, the WPLL announced a partnership with Subway, with the competition officially known as the Subway Women’s League Cup for sponsorship reasons.

== Format ==
The competition kept the same format as the previous season, starting with a group stage split regionally. However, the competition ran with 23 teams, one fewer than previous season, after Reading withdrew from the Championship in June 2024. Teams competing in the UEFA Women's Champions League group stage are exempt from the League Cup group stage, earning a provisional bye to the quarter-finals. As a result, the initial group stage draw made on 19 August 2024 featured 20 of the 23 teams, with all groups featuring four teams each. The three teams excluded from the draw were Chelsea, who automatically entered the Champions League group stage, and Manchester City and Arsenal who advanced in the Champions League qualifying rounds, and will all enter the League Cup at the quarter-final stage.

The first place team in each of the five groups qualifies for the knock-out stage.

== Group stage ==
=== Group A ===
| Pos | Team | Pld | W | PW | PL | L | GF | GA | GD | Pts | Qualification | MUN | LIV | EVE | NUN |
|---|---|---|---|---|---|---|---|---|---|---|---|---|---|---|---|
| 1 | Manchester United | 3 | 3 | 0 | 0 | 0 | 9 | 3 | +6 | 9 | Advanced to knock-out stage | — | 2–0 | – | 5–3 |
| 2 | Liverpool | 3 | 2 | 0 | 0 | 1 | 10 | 3 | +7 | 6 | | – | — | 4–0 | – |
| 3 | Everton | 3 | 0 | 1 | 0 | 2 | 1 | 7 | −6 | 2 | | 0–2 | – | — | – |
| 4 | Newcastle United | 3 | 0 | 0 | 1 | 2 | 5 | 12 | −7 | 1 | | – | 1–6 | 1–1 | — |

Updated to match(es) played on 24 November 2024. Source: Women's League Cup
Rules for classification: 1) Points; 2) Goal difference; 3) Number of goals scored; 4) Number of wins; 5) Head-to-head record
2 October 2024
19:00

| Manchester United | 2–0 | Liverpool |
|---|---|---|
| Malard 9'; R. Williams 67' | Report |

Leigh Sports Village, Leigh
Attendance: 2,568
Referee: Elizabeth Simms
2 October 2024
19:45

| Newcastle United | 1–1 | Everton |
|---|---|---|
| Stokes 5' | Report | Bissell 50' |
Penalties
| Andrews (penalty missed); Gibson (penalty missed); Furness (penalty missed) | 0–3 | (penalty scored) Vanhaevermaet; (penalty scored) Snoeijs; (penalty scored) Finnigan |

Kingston Park Stadium, Kingston Park
Attendance: 1,379
Referee: Grace Lowe

20 November 2024
19:00

| Everton | 0–2 | Manchester United |
|---|---|---|
| | Report | Brosnan 15' (o.g.); Le Tissier 77' |

Walton Hall Park, Walton Hall Park
Attendance: 789
Referee: Phoebe Cross
24 November 2024
14:00

| Newcastle United | 1–6 | Liverpool |
|---|---|---|
| Andrews 88' | Report | Shaw 10'; Enderby 12', 55'; Smith 35'; Kapocs 45+1'; Kiernan 90+3' |

Kingston Park Stadium, Kingston Park
Attendance: 3,013
Referee: Hannah Gardner

11 December 2024
18:00

| Liverpool | 4–0 | Everton |
|---|---|---|
| Clark 28'; Enderby 58', 90'; Kapocs 83' | Report |

Totally Wicked Stadium, St Helens
Attendance: 3,219
Referee: Adewunmi Soneye
11 December 2024
19:00

| Manchester United | 5–3 | Newcastle United |
|---|---|---|
| Greenwood 9' (o.g.); Watson 24'; Williams 68'; George 83'; Terland 88' | Report | Cooper 13'; Andrews 47'; Joel 90+3' |

Leigh Sports Village, Leigh
Attendance: 1,745
Referee: Elizabeth Simms

=== Group B ===
| Pos | Team | Pld | W | WPEN | LPEN | L | GF | GA | GD | Pts | Qualification | DUR | BLB | SUN | SHU |
|---|---|---|---|---|---|---|---|---|---|---|---|---|---|---|---|
| 1 | Durham | 3 | 2 | 1 | 0 | 0 | 5 | 3 | +2 | 8 | Advanced to knock-out stage | — | – | – | 1–1 |
| 2 | Blackburn Rovers | 3 | 2 | 0 | 0 | 1 | 8 | 5 | +3 | 6 | | 1–2 | — | – | 4–2 |
| 3 | Sunderland | 3 | 1 | 0 | 0 | 2 | 4 | 6 | −2 | 3 | | 1–2 | 1–3 | — | – |
| 4 | Sheffield United | 3 | 0 | 0 | 1 | 2 | 4 | 7 | −3 | 1 | | – | – | 1–2 | — |

Updated to match(es) played on 3 October 2024. Source: Women's League Cup
Rules for classification: 1) Points; 2) Goal difference; 3) Number of goals scored; 4) Number of wins; 5) Head-to-head record
2 October 2024
19:00

| Blackburn Rovers | 1–2 | Durham |
|---|---|---|
| Riglar 17' | Report | Novak 80'; Ryan-Doyle 87' |

Lancashire FA County Ground, Lancashire
Attendance: 159
Referee: Hannah Gardner
3 October 2024
19:00

| Sheffield United | 1–2 | Sunderland |
|---|---|---|
| Farrugia 51' | Report | Watson 2'; Cassap 77' |

North Street, Alfreton
Attendance: 202
Referee: Lauren Whiteman

24 November 2024
12:00

| Durham | 1–1 | Sheffield United |
|---|---|---|
| Ryan-Doyle 61' | Report | Robinson 55' |
Penalties
| Hepple (penalty scored); Ryan-Doyle (penalty scored); Johns (penalty missed); Foster (penalty scored); Salicki (penalty scored) | 4–3 | (penalty scored) Kinzett; (penalty missed) Butler; (penalty scored) Phillips; (penalty missed) Robinson; (penalty scored) Farrugia |

Maiden Castle, Durham
Attendance: 582
Referee: Melissa Burgin
24 November 2024
14:00

| Sunderland | 1–3 | Blackburn Rovers |
|---|---|---|
| Kitching 61' | Report | Hack 16'; Edwards 65', 90' |

Eppleton CW, Hetton-le-Hole
Attendance: 376
Referee: Lucy May

11 December 2024
19:00

| Blackburn Rovers | 4–2 | Sheffield United |
|---|---|---|
| Edwards 3', 19', 45+2'; Toland 52' | Report | Murray 65'; Farrugia 71' |

Lancashire FA County Ground, Lancashire
Attendance: 180
Referee: Aimee Keir
11 December 2024
19:30

| Sunderland | 1–2 | Durham |
|---|---|---|
| Watson 6' | Report | Ryan-Doyle 1'; Novak 58' |

Eppleton CW, Hetton-le-Hole
Attendance: 450
Referee: Grace Lowe

=== Group C ===
| Pos | Team | Pld | W | WPEN | LPEN | L | GF | GA | GD | Pts | Qualification | WHU | LCL | SOU | POR |
|---|---|---|---|---|---|---|---|---|---|---|---|---|---|---|---|
| 1 | West Ham United | 3 | 3 | 0 | 0 | 0 | 13 | 2 | +11 | 9 | Advanced to knock-out stage | — | – | 3–0 | 6–1 |
| 2 | London City Lionesses | 3 | 2 | 0 | 0 | 1 | 7 | 6 | +1 | 6 | | 1–4 | — | – | – |
| 3 | Southampton | 3 | 1 | 0 | 0 | 2 | 4 | 4 | 0 | 3 | | – | 0–1 | — | – |
| 4 | Portsmouth | 3 | 0 | 0 | 0 | 3 | 3 | 15 | −12 | 0 | | – | 2–5 | 0–4 | — |

Updated to match(es) played on 24 November 2024. Source: Women's League Cup
Rules for classification: 1) Points; 2) Goal difference; 3) Number of goals scored; 4) Number of wins; 5) Head-to-head record
2 October 2024
19:00

| West Ham United | 6–1 | Portsmouth |
|---|---|---|
| Piubel 13'; Harries 43', 52'; Asseyi 46', 49'; Ueki 90+3' | Report | Hornby 25' (pen.) |

Victoria Road, Dagenham
Attendance: 256
Referee: Kirsty Dowle
3 October 2024
19:00

| Southampton | 0–1 | London City Lionesses |
|---|---|---|
| | Report | Wilde 86' |

Ten Acres, Eastleigh
Attendance: 753
Referee: Levi Gray

24 November 2024
14:00

| London City Lionesses | 1–4 | West Ham United |
|---|---|---|
| Jakobsson 45+1' | Report | Asseyi 14', 72'; Paví 71'; Ueki 90+4' |

Hayes Lane, Bromley
Attendance: 931
Referee: Jade Wardle
24 November 2024
14:00

| Portsmouth | 0–4 | Southampton |
|---|---|---|
| | Report | Thompson 18', 32', 90+2'; Collett 22' |

Westleigh Park, Havant
Attendance: 380
Referee: Aaron Ford

11 December 2024
19:00

| Portsmouth | 2–5 | London City Lionesses |
|---|---|---|
| Hornby 66', 84' | Report | Marashi 1', 41'; Goldie 31'; Ivanović 45+1', 61' |

Westleigh Park, Havant
Attendance: 201
Referee: Sophie Dennington
11 December 2024
19:00

| West Ham United | 3–0 | Southampton |
|---|---|---|
| Zadorsky 60'; Peake 76' (o.g.); Brynjarsdóttir 90+3' | Report |

Victoria Road, Dagenham
Attendance: 468
Referee: Amy Fearns

=== Group D ===
| Pos | Team | Pld | W | WPEN | LPEN | L | GF | GA | GD | Pts | Qualification | BHA | LEI | BIR | BRI |
|---|---|---|---|---|---|---|---|---|---|---|---|---|---|---|---|
| 1 | Brighton & Hove Albion | 3 | 2 | 0 | 1 | 0 | 9 | 2 | +7 | 7 | Advanced to knock-out stage | — | 0–0 | – | 6–2 |
| 2 | Leicester City | 3 | 1 | 1 | 1 | 0 | 6 | 3 | +3 | 6 | | – | — | 5–2 | 1–1 |
| 3 | Birmingham City | 3 | 1 | 0 | 0 | 2 | 5 | 9 | −4 | 3 | | 0–3 | – | — | – |
| 4 | Bristol City | 3 | 0 | 1 | 0 | 2 | 4 | 10 | −6 | 2 | | – | – | 1–3 | — |

Updated to match(es) played on 11 December 2024. Source: Women's League Cup
Rules for classification: 1) Points; 2) Goal difference; 3) Number of goals scored; 4) Number of wins; 5) Head-to-head record
2 October 2024
19:00

| Birmingham City | 0–3 | Brighton & Hove Albion |
|---|---|---|
| | Report | Bergsvand 71'; Symonds 74'; Kirby 86' |

St Andrew's, Birmingham
Attendance: 842
Referee: Amy Fearns
2 October 2024
19:00

| Leicester City | 1–1 | Bristol City |
|---|---|---|
| Chossenotte 67' | Report | Lloyd-Smith 80' |
Penalties
| Thibaud (penalty scored); Mouchon (penalty missed); Pelgander (penalty missed); Rantala (penalty missed); Chossenotte (penalty missed) | 1–2 | (penalty scored) Harrison; (penalty missed) Lloyd-Smith; (penalty missed) Ward; (penalty scored) Woolley; (penalty missed) Rodgers |

Pirelli Stadium, Burton upon Trent
Attendance: 250
Referee: Lucy May

24 November 2024
14:00

| Brighton & Hove Albion | 0–0 | Leicester City |
|---|---|---|
| | Report |
Penalties
| Parris (penalty scored); Čanković (penalty scored); Seike (penalty scored); Agyemang (penalty missed); Symonds (penalty missed) | 3–4 | (penalty scored) Thibaud; (penalty scored) Mace; (penalty missed) Momiki; (penalty scored) Cayman; (penalty scored) Rose |

Broadfield Stadium, Crawley
Attendance: 1,069
Referee: Joanne Horwood
24 November 2024
15:00

| Bristol City | 1–3 | Birmingham City |
|---|---|---|
| Harrison 15' | Report | Agg 10'; Worsey 14'; Magill 34' |

Robins HPC, Failand
Attendance: 272
Referee: Kirsty Dowle

11 December 2024
19:00

| Brighton & Hove Albion | 6–2 | Bristol City |
|---|---|---|
| Vilamala 7'; McLauchlan 28'; Bremer 42'; Agyemang 48'; Parris 69', 86' | Report | Teisar 10'; Bull 51' |

Broadfield Stadium, Crawley
Attendance: 710
Referee: Joanne Horwood
11 December 2024
19:00

| Leicester City | 5–2 | Birmingham City |
|---|---|---|
| Herron 34' (o.g.); Momiki 37' (pen.); Bott 39'; Sherwood 42'; Cain 67' | Report | Baker 13'; Harrison-Murray 90+8' |

Meadow Lane, Nottingham
Attendance: 289
Referee: Phoebe Cross

=== Group E ===
| Pos | Team | Pld | W | WPEN | LPEN | L | GF | GA | GD | Pts | Qualification | TOT | AST | CRY | CHA |
|---|---|---|---|---|---|---|---|---|---|---|---|---|---|---|---|
| 1 | Tottenham Hotspur | 3 | 3 | 0 | 0 | 0 | 5 | 1 | +4 | 9 | Advanced to knock-out stage | — | 1–0 | – | – |
| 2 | Aston Villa | 3 | 2 | 0 | 0 | 1 | 6 | 2 | +4 | 6 | | – | — | 2–0 | 4–1 |
| 3 | Crystal Palace | 3 | 1 | 0 | 0 | 2 | 2 | 4 | −2 | 3 | | 0–2 | – | — | 2–0 |
| 4 | Charlton Athletic | 3 | 0 | 0 | 0 | 3 | 2 | 8 | −6 | 0 | | 1–2 | – | – | — |

Updated to match(es) played on 23 November 2024. Source: Women's League Cup
Rules for classification: 1) Points; 2) Goal difference; 3) Number of goals scored; 4) Number of wins; 5) Head-to-head record
2 October 2024
19:15

| Aston Villa | 2–0 | Crystal Palace |
|---|---|---|
| Hanson 80'; Robinson 90+2' | Report |

Bescot Stadium, Walsall
Attendance: 422
Referee: Adewunmi Soneye
2 October 2024
19:15

| Charlton Athletic | 1–2 | Tottenham Hotspur |
|---|---|---|
| Bradley 45' | Report | Bühler 8'; Naz 86' |

The Valley, Charlton
Attendance: 664
Referee: Lisa Benn

23 November 2024
12:15

| Tottenham Hotspur | 1–0 | Aston Villa |
|---|---|---|
| Summanen 60' | Report |

Brisbane Road, Leyton
Attendance: 820
Referee: Stacey Fullicks
24 November 2024
14:00

| Crystal Palace | 2–0 | Charlton Athletic |
|---|---|---|
| Weerden 11'; Gejl 24' | Report |

Gander Green Lane, Sutton
Attendance: 172
Referee: Adewunmi Soneye

11 December 2024
19:00

| Crystal Palace | 0–2 | Tottenham Hotspur |
|---|---|---|
| | Report | Vinberg 50'; Dennis 71' |

Gander Green Lane, Sutton
Attendance: 257
Referee: Emily Heaslip
11 December 2024
19:15

| Aston Villa | 4–1 | Charlton Athletic |
|---|---|---|
| Daly 25', 85'; Salmon 32', 47' | Report | Newsham 10' |

Bescot Stadium, Walsall
Attendance: 659
Referee: Stacey Fullicks

== Knock-out stage ==
Quarter-finals
Chelsea | 5
Durham | 0
Tottenham Hotspur | 1
West Ham United | 2
Brighton & Hove Albion | 0
Arsenal | 4
Manchester United | 1
Manchester City | 2

Semi-finals
Chelsea | 2
West Ham United | 0
Arsenal | 1
Manchester City | 2

Final
15 March – Derby
Chelsea | 2
Manchester City | 1

=== Quarter-finals ===
Arsenal, Chelsea and Manchester City entered the League Cup at the quarter-final stage, having been exempt from the group stage due to their participation in the Champions League group stage. The draw for the quarter-final and semi-final took place on 16 December 2024.

22 January 2025
18:45

| Chelsea | 5–0 | Durham |
|---|---|---|
| Beever-Jones 21'; Jean-François 61'; Cuthbert 73'; Reiten 75'; Hamano 77' | Report |

Kingsmeadow, Kingston upon Thames
Attendance: 1,243
Referee: Kirsty Dowle

22 January 2025
19:00

| Manchester United | 1–2 | Manchester City |
|---|---|---|
| Turner 35' | Report | Coombs 12'; Murphy 45+2' |

Leigh Sports Village Stadium, Leigh
Attendance: 3,011
Referee: Stacey Fullicks

22 January 2025
19:15

| Brighton & Hove Albion | 0–4 | Arsenal |
|---|---|---|
| | Report | Maanum 65'; McCabe 68'; Cooney-Cross 70'; Caldentey 83' |

Broadfield Stadium, Crawley
Attendance: 2,150 or 2,115
Referee: Lisa Benn

22 January 2025
19:30

| Tottenham Hotspur | 1–2 | West Ham United |
|---|---|---|
| Thomas 10' | Report | Piubel 39'; Smith 44' |

Gaughan Group Stadium, Leyton
Attendance: 992
Referee: Ryan Atkin

=== Semi-finals ===
5 February 2025
19:00

| Chelsea | 2–0 | West Ham United |
|---|---|---|
| Rytting Kaneryd 20'; Nüsken 29' | Report |

Kingsmeadow, Kingston upon Thames
Attendance: 1,455
Referee: Stacey Pearson

6 February 2025
19:30

| Arsenal | 1–2 | Manchester City |
|---|---|---|
| Caldentey 58' (pen.) | Report | Fowler 26', 90+5' |

Meadow Park, Borehamwood
Attendance: 2,065
Referee: Kirsty Dowle

=== Final ===
On 16 December 2024, it was announced that the 2025 final would be held at Pride Park Stadium, the home of Derby County, for the first time. It was also announced that VAR and goal-line technology would be returning.

15 March 2025
12:15

| Chelsea | 2–1 | Manchester City |
|---|---|---|
| Ramírez 8'; Hasegawa 77' (o.g.) | Report | Fujino 64' |

Pride Park Stadium, Derby
Attendance: 14,187
Referee: Emily Heaslip

== Top goalscorers ==
| Rank | Player | Club | Goals |
|---|---|---|---|
| 1 | (England) Maria Edwards | Blackburn Rovers | 5 |
| 2 | (England) Mia Enderby | Liverpool | 4 |
| 2 | (France) Viviane Asseyi | West Ham | 4 |
| 4 | (Republic of Ireland) Eleanor Ryan-Doyle | Durham | 3 |
| 4 | (England) Megan Hornby | Portsmouth | 3 |
| 4 | (England) Emma Thompson | Southampton | 3 |
| 7 | 16 players | | 2 |

== See also ==
- 2024–25 Women's FA Cup
