= Nelly Las =

English footballer (born 2007)

Nelly Lašová
- Las in 2026

Personal information
- Date of birth: 17 December 2007 (age 18)
- Place of birth: Kettering, England
- Height: 5 ft 6 in (1.68 m)
- Positions: Winger; wingback

Team information
- Current team: Chelsea
- Number: 17

Youth career
- Beaumont Park FC
- Leicester City

Senior career*
Years	Team	Apps	(Gls)
2024–2026	Leicester City	16	(0)
2026	→ Ipswich Town (loan)	2	(0)
2026–	Chelsea	1	(0)

International career^{‡}
2023–2024	England U17	19	(1)
2025–	England U19	9	(0)
- * Club domestic league appearances and goals as of 13 September 2026 ‡ National team caps and goals as of 28 October 2025

Nelly Lašová (Slovak: [ˈlaʃɔːva] LAH-shoh-vah; born 17 December 2007), known professionally as Nelly Las, is an English footballer who plays as a right winger or right wingback for Women's Super League club Chelsea and the England under-19 national team. She has also played professionally for Leicester City—of which she is an academy graduate—and on loan for Ipswich Town.

== Early life ==
Nelly Lašová was born on 17 December 2007 in Kettering, England. She has an older brother, Tobias, and a twin brother, Noel. Her mother, Paula, is a single parent who moved to the UK from Slovakia in 2006 and is a nurse. Las credits her mother for her football career, and, in 2025, stated she hopes to buy her mother her dream car and house when she ‘‘make[s] it.’’

Following a successful trial, Las was offered a place in Leicester City's academy when she was 10. Her mother chose to reject the offer in favour of Las playing for boys side Beaumont Park FC alongside her brother, where she felt Las would benefit from being mentally and physically challenged. At 13, Las was again approached to join Leicester's academy, where she trialled with both the under-14 and under-16 teams.

== Club career ==
=== Leicester City ===
Las made her senior debut for Leicester on 2 October 2024 in the League Cup against Bristol City W.F.C., which Leicester eventually lost in a penalty shoot-out. She appeared in her first Women's Super League match on 14 December 2024, a 1–1 draw with Chelsea. Las scored her first professional goal in a 4–1 win over Stoke City on 15 January 2025 in the 2024–25 Women's FA Cup. She scored her second professional goal on 9 February 2025 in a 3–1 away defeat against Manchester City in the same competition.

On 3 February 2026, having made a total of 23 appearances for Leicester City, Las joined Ipswich Town, at the bottom of the WSL 2 table, for the remainder of the 2025–26 season.

=== Chelsea ===
On 24 July 2026, it was announced that Las had signed for Chelsea on a four-year contract. On 2 September 2026, she made her competitive debut for the club as a substitute during Chelsea's second-leg Champions League qualifying victory over Real Sociedad.

== International career ==
Eligible to represent both Slovakia and England on the international stage, Las has opted to represent England at the under-17 and under-19 age groups.

Las represented England at the 2024 Under-17 Euro, her side finishing as runners-up to Spain. She was selected by UEFA technical analysts as part of the team of the tournament. Later that year, Las was selected for the 2024 U-17 World Cup and scored in a group stage game against Mexico. She then started in the quarter-final victory over Japan and semi-final elimination against Spain as England finished fourth. Las was part of the squad that qualified for the 2025 Under-19 Euro.

== Personal life ==
Of Slovak descent, Las is fluent in both English and Slovak.

Having played together at Leicester in both the academy and senior sides, Las describes Simone Sherwood as one of her best friends in football. As of August 2026, she lives with Chelsea and England teammate Lola Brown.

Las describes fellow right-back Lucy Bronze as her role-model, and has expressed wanting to emulate—or even be ‘‘better than’’—Bronze. After Leicester drew against Chelsea in December 2024 (Las' league debut), she shared that she still looks up to Bronze and ‘‘couldn't really believe’’ they had shared the pitch. As of Las' transfer to Chelsea in July 2026, Las and Bronze are club teammates.

== Career statistics ==
=== Club ===
As of match played 13 September 2026

Appearances and goals by club, season and competition
Club	Season	League			Cup (Note: Includes the Women's FA Cup)		League Cup (Note: Includes the WSL Players Cup, formerly known as the Women's League Cup)		Europe		Total	
Club	Season	Division	Apps	Goals	Apps	Goals	Apps	Goals	Apps	Goals	Apps	Goals
Leicester City	2024–25	WSL	12	0	2	2	3	0	—		17	2
Leicester City	2025–26	WSL	4	0	0	0	2	0	—		6	0
Leicester City	Total		16	0	2	2	5	0	0	0	23	2
Ipswich Town (loan)	2025–26	WSL 2	2	0	0	0	0	0	—		2	0
Chelsea	2026–27	WSL	1	0	0	0	0	0	1	0	2	0
Career total			19	0	2	2	5	0	1	0	27	2

== Honours ==
England

- 2024 UEFA Women's Under-17 Championship: runner-up
