= Lize Kop =

Dutch footballer (born 1998)

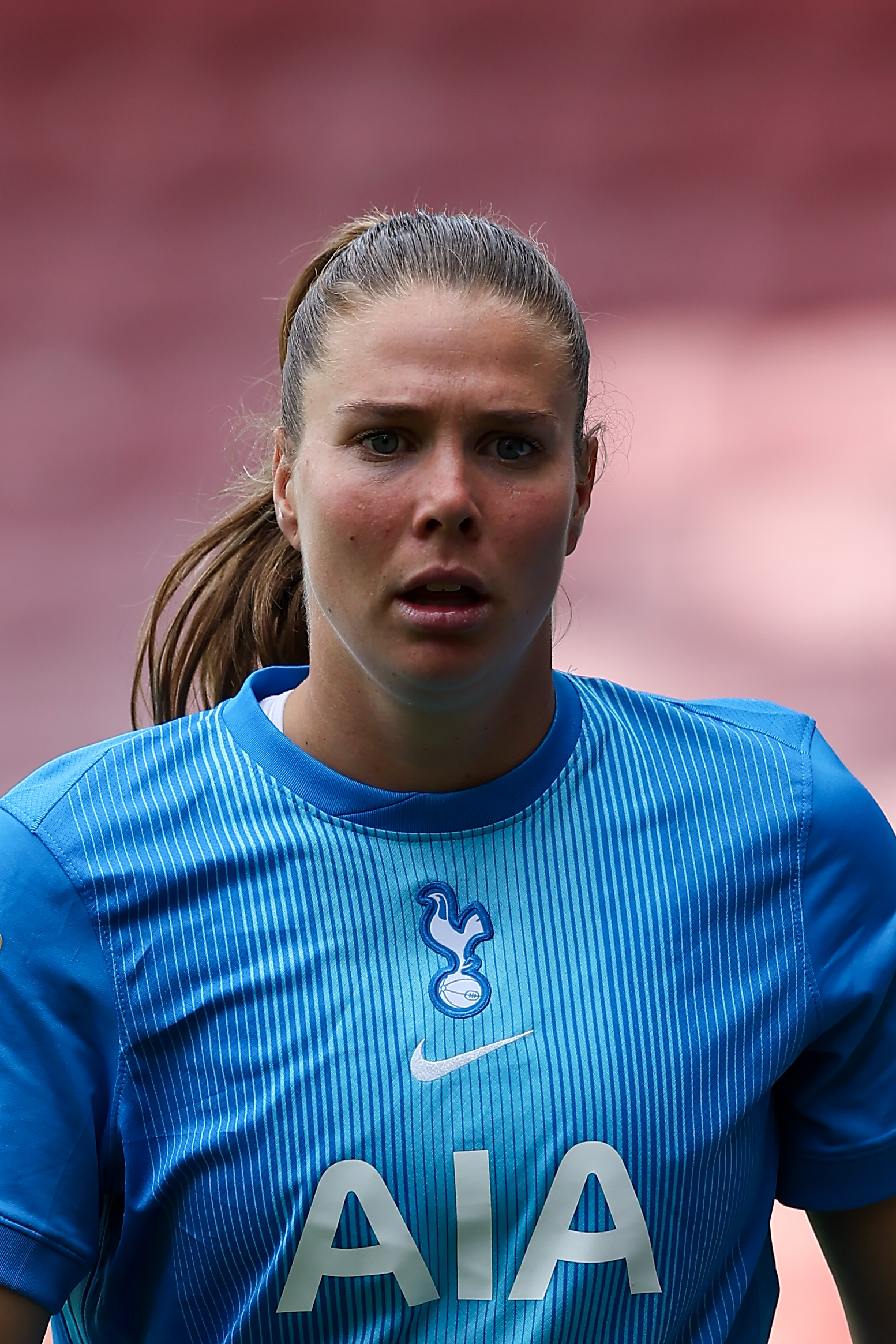
- Kop with Tottenham Hotspur in 2025

Personal information
- Date of birth: 17 March 1998 (age 28)
- Place of birth: Wormer, Netherlands
- Height: 1.73 m (5 ft 8 in)
- Position: Goalkeeper

Team information
- Current team: Tottenham Hotspur
- Number: 1

Youth career
- Telstar
- Ajax

Senior career*
Years	Team	Apps	(Gls)
2017–2023	Ajax	82	(0)
2023–2025	Leicester City	10	(0)
2025–	Tottenham Hotspur	36	(0)

International career^{‡}
2014	Netherlands U16	4	(0)
2014–2015	Netherlands U17	5	(0)
2015–2017	Netherlands U19	16	(0)
2018	Netherlands U20	6	(0)
2019	Netherlands U23	2	(0)
2019–	Netherlands	25	(0)
Medal record
Women's football
Representing the Netherlands
FIFA Women's World Cup
Runner-up	2019 France
- * Club domestic league appearances and goals as of 07:44, 14 September 2026 (UTC) ‡ National team caps and goals as of 13 October 2026

Lize Kop (Dutch: [ˈlizə ˈkɔp]; born 17 March 1998) is a Dutch professional footballer who plays as a goalkeeper for Women's Super League club Tottenham Hotspur and the Netherlands national team. She previously played for Ajax and Leicester City.

== Club career ==
Kop made her league debut against Achilles '29 on 3 September 2017. On 24 January 2023, she played her 100th game for the club in a match against ADO Den Haag.

On 16 August 2023, Kop signed for Women's Super League club Leicester City on a three-year deal. She made her league debut against Everton on 28 January 2024.

On 15 January 2025, it was announced that Kop had signed for Women's Super League club Tottenham Hotspur until June 2028.

== International career ==
Kop was selected for the 2019 FIFA Women's World Cup. She made her international debut in 2019 against Poland in the Algarve Cup. On 10 April 2019, Kop was named in the 2019 FIFA Women's World Cup squad. On 16 June 2021, she was included in the 2020 Summer Olympics squad. On 31 May 2023, she was named as part of the Netherlands provisional squad for the 2023 FIFA Women's World Cup. On 24 September 2023, Kop had to withdraw from training camp due to lack of fitness. On 27 May 2024, Kop, Caitlin Dijkstra, and Romée Leuchter had to drop out due to injury.

== Career statistics ==
=== Club ===
As of match played 13 September 2026

Appearances and goals by club, season and competition
Club	Season	League			National cup (Note: Includes KNVB Women's Cup, Women's FA Cup)		League cup (Note: Includes Eredivisie Cup (women), Women's League Cup)		Continental		Other		Total	
Club	Season	Division	Apps	Goals	Apps	Goals	Apps	Goals	Apps	Goals	Apps	Goals	Apps	Goals
Ajax	2017–18	Vrouwen Eredivisie	13	0	?	?	?	?	0	0	—		13	0
Ajax	2018–19	Vrouwen Eredivisie	20	0	?	?	?	?	3	0	—		23	0
Ajax	2019–20	Vrouwen Eredivisie	12	0	?	?	?	?	—		—		12	0
Ajax	2020–21	Vrouwen Eredivisie	15	0	1	0	5	0	2	0	—		23	0
Ajax	2021–22	Vrouwen Eredivisie	2	0	0	0	1	0	—		—		3	0
Ajax	2022–23	Vrouwen Eredivisie	20	0	1	0	1	0	4	0	1 (Note: Appearance(s) in Dutch Women's Super Cup)	0	27	0
Ajax	Total		82	0	2	0	7	0	9	0	1	0	101	0
Leicester City	2023–24	Women's Super League	8	0	3	0	2	0	—		—		13	0
Leicester City	2024–25	Women's Super League	2	0	0	0	2	0	—		—		4	0
Leicester City	Total		10	0	3	0	4	0	0	0	0	0	17	0
Tottenham Hotspur	2024–25	Women's Super League	12	0	0	0	0	0	—		—		12	0
Tottenham Hotspur	2025–26	Women's Super League	22	0	3	0	4	0	—		—		29	0
Tottenham Hotspur	2026–27	Women's Super League	2	0	0	0	0	0	—		—		2	0
Tottenham Hotspur	Total		36	0	3	0	4	0	0	0	0	0	43	0
Career total			128	0	8	0	16	0	9	0	1	0	161	0

=== International ===
As of match played 13 October 2026

Appearances and goals by national team and year
National team	Year	Apps	Goals
Netherlands	2019	1	0
Netherlands	2020	4	0
Netherlands	2021	1	0
Netherlands	2022	1	0
Netherlands	2023	0	0
Netherlands	2024	6	0
Netherlands	2025	6	0
Netherlands	2026	6	0
Total		25	0

== Honours ==
Ajax

- Eredivisie: 2017–18, 2022–23
- KNVB Women's Cup: 2017–18, 2018–19, 2021–22
- Eredivisie Cup: 2020–21

Netherlands

- FIFA Women's World Cup runner-up: 2019
- Algarve Cup: 2018

Individual

- UEFA Women's Under-19 Championship team of the tournament: 2017
