= Missy Goodwin =

Professional footballer

Personal information
- Full name: Deearna Missy Goodwin
- Date of birth: 27 January 2003 (age 23)
- Place of birth: Redditch, England
- Height: 1.70 m (5 ft 7 in)
- Position: Forward

Team information
- Current team: Leicester City
- Number: 10

Youth career
- 2010–2020: Birmingham City
- 2020–2022: Aston Villa

Senior career*
Years	Team	Apps	(Gls)
2019–2021	Birmingham City	0	(0)
2021–2022	Aston Villa	0	(0)
2022–	Leicester City	80	(4)

International career^{‡}
2019	England U17	3	(0)
2021–2022	England U19	5	(2)
2023–	England U23	5	(1)
- * Club domestic league appearances and goals as of 15 November 2026 ‡ National team caps and goals as of 18:04, 3 April 2025

Deearna Missy Goodwin (born 27 January 2003) is an English professional footballer who plays as a forward for Women's Super League 2 club Leicester City and the England under-23s. She previously played for Birmingham City, Aston Villa, and has represented England from under-17 youth level.

== Early life ==
Goodwin grew up in Redditch and attended St Augustine's High School. She played in the Worcestershire County Schools’ under-14s and featured in the 2017 Gothia World Youth Cup.

== Club career ==
=== Birmingham City ===
Goodwin came up through the Birmingham City youth system, spending 10 years with the club, and featured in one game for the academy team. Ahead of the 2019–20 season, she spent preseason with the senior team before being registered as part of the first-team squad, gaining first tier gameday experience although she did not debut.

=== Aston Villa ===
In July 2020, Goodwin left Birmingham to sign with Aston Villa. Initially playing as part of the club's under-21 WSL academy team, she scored four goals in three appearances for the youth team. She then made her senior debut on 17 November 2021, as a 78th-minute substitute in Villa's 2–1 defeat to Sheffield United in the FA Women's League Cup.

=== Leicester City ===
On 7 January 2022, Goodwin signed for Leicester City on a short-term contract for the remainder of the 2021–22 season, making her first appearance for the team on 16 January 2022 against Brighton & Hove Albion for a 1–0 win. On 18 January 2023, during the 2022–23 season, she scored her debut goal for the Foxes in the League Cup, scoring the first goal in a 5–0 result against Sunderland.

On 29 April 2023, she scored her debut WSL goal, in injury time against Liverpool in a 4–0 victory. On 6 July 2023, she signed a new long-term deal with the club. On 5 November 2023, she scored her first goal of the 2023–24 season against Liverpool, with the game ending in a 2–1 defeat.

On 14 December 2024, during the 2024–25 season, Goodwin scored the opening goal against league leaders Chelsea in a 1–1 draw, putting the champions behind for the first time in the season. City received a standing ovation from fans at the King Power Stadium after the first half, courtesy of the well-worked goal that gained the lead.

== International career ==
=== Youth ===
In October 2019, with England under-17s, Goodwin played in all three qualifying round matches during 2020 U-17 Championship qualification, as England won all three games, qualifying the team for the elite round, that was subsequently cancelled due to the COVID-19 pandemic.

In October 2021, Goodwin featured in the under-19 squad during 2022 U-19 Championship qualification and scored in an 8–1 win over Northern Ireland. In the second round of qualification on 6 April 2022, she scored the second goal against Wales in a 3–0 victory.

In February 2023, Goodwin was named as part of the under-23 squad for a fixture against Belgium, and was an unused substitute in the match. On 6 April 2023, she made her debut for England U23 as 68th-minute substitute, gaining a penalty in injury time to secure a 3–2 victory.

== Career statistics ==
=== Club ===
As of match played 18 November 2026.

Appearances and goals by club, season and competition
Club	Season	League			FA Cup		League Cup		Total	
Club	Season	Division	Apps	Goals	Apps	Goals	Apps	Goals	Apps	Goals
Aston Villa	2021–22	Women's Super League	0	0	0	0	1	0	1	0
Leicester City	2021–22	Women's Super League	6	0	1	0	0	0	7	0
Leicester City	2022–23	Women's Super League	22	1	1	0	2	1	25	2
Leicester City	2023–24	Women's Super League	17	1	2	0	4	1	23	2
Leicester City	2024–25	Women's Super League	19	2	2	1	3	0	24	3
Leicester City	2025–26	Women's Super League	8	0	0	0	0	0	8	0
Leicester City	2026–27	Women's Super League 2	8	0	0	0	4	0	12	0
Leicester City	Total		80	4	6	1	13	2	99	7
Career total			80	4	6	1	14	2	100	7
