= Shana Chossenotte =

French footballer (born 2005)

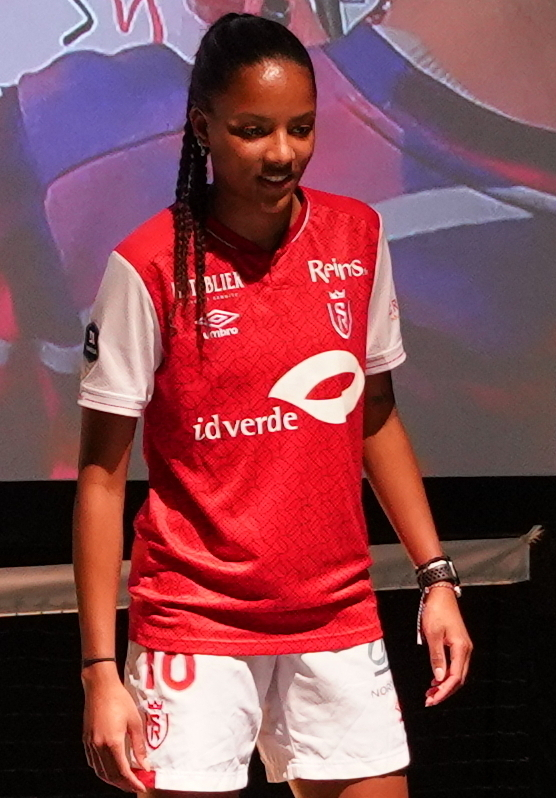
- Chossenotte in 2024

Personal information
- Full name: Shana Soukeyna Nathalie Chossenotte
- Date of birth: February 14, 2005 (age 21)
- Place of birth: Reims, France
- Height: 1.73 m (5 ft 8 in)
- Position: Forward

Team information
- Current team: Fleury
- Number: 7

Youth career
- 2013–2017: FC Sillery
- 2017–2022: Reims

Senior career*
Years	Team	Apps	(Gls)
2021–2024	Reims	35	(6)
2024–2025	Leicester City	18	(1)
2025–	Fleury	17	(0)

International career^{‡}
2021–2022	France U17	9	(5)
2022	France U18	4	(0)
2023–2024	France U19	21	(4)
2024	France U20	5	(1)
2025–	France U23	10	(2)
- * Club domestic league appearances and goals as of 05:12, 13 June 2026 (UTC) ‡ National team caps and goals as of 23:30, 12 October 2026 (UTC)

Shana Soukeyna Nathalie Chossenotte (born 14 February 2005) is a French professional footballer who plays as a forward for Première Ligue club FC Fleury 91. She has previously played for Reims, English club Leicester City, and various French youth national teams.

== Club career ==
=== Reims ===
Born in Reims, Chossenotte started playing football with FC Sillery before joining Stade de Reims' under-13 squad in 2017. While a member of Reims' youth academy, she was able to play in 4 matches with the club's Division 1 Féminine team during the 2021–22 season. On 15 July 2022, Chossenotte signed her first professional contract with Reims' senior team. She made 10 appearances (5 starts) in her first season of first-team football.

Chossenotte kicked off her second professional season with Reims on a good note, scoring a brace in the club's season-opening victory over AS Saint-Étienne. She went on to record 23 appearances and 5 goals across the campaign. In August 2024, Chossenotte announced her departure from Reims after 7 years with the club.

=== Leicester City ===
On 28 August 2024, Chossenotte joined English Women's Super League club Leicester City on a three-year contract. In doing so, she reunited with former Reims coach Amandine Miquel and teammate Noémie Mouchon, both of whom also moved to Leicester City over the summer. Leicester opened its 2024–25 campaign with four straight winless league games before beating Everton on 20 October 2024, 1–0. It was Chossenotte who ultimately assisted Yūka Momiki's goal that lifted Leicester to its first victory of the season. In March 2025, Chossenotte scored her first WSL goal, netting the eventual game-winner in a 3–2 victory over Brighton & Hove Albion. Despite struggling with injuries at multiple points in the season, Chossenotte managed to total 21 appearances across all competitions in her sole campaign with Leicester.

=== Fleury ===
In September 2025, FC Fleury 91 acquired Chossenotte from Leicester City in exchange for an undisclosed transfer fee.

== International career ==
Chossenotte has represented France at multiple youth national team levels. In 2022, she was a member of the French under-17 team that won bronze at the 2022 UEFA Women's Under-17 Championship. The following year, she was called up to represent France in the 2023 UEFA Women's Under-19 Championship.

In May 2024, Chossenotte received her first minutes with the under-20 national team in the Sud Ladies Cup. During France's opening match of the competition, she scored a goal from outside the box in a 3–0 victory over Morocco. Three months later, Chossenotte was included in France's squad for the 2024 FIFA U-20 Women's World Cup.

== Career statistics ==
As of 10 September 2025

Appearances and goals by club, season and competition
Club	Season	League			National cup (Note: Includes Coupe de France Féminine, Women's FA Cup)		League cup (Note: Includes FA Women's League Cup)		Other		Total	
Club	Season	Division	Apps	Goals	Apps	Goals	Apps	Goals	Apps	Goals	Apps	Goals
Reims	2021–22	Division 1 Féminine	4	0	1	0	—		—		5	0
Reims	2022–23	Division 1 Féminine	10	1	1	0	—		—		11	1
Reims	2023–24	Division 1 Féminine	21	5	1	0	—		2 (Note: Appearances in playoffs)	0	24	5
Reims	Total		35	6	3	0	0	0	2	0	40	6
Leicester City	2024–25	Women's Super League	18	1	1	0	2	1	—		21	2
FC Fleury 91	2025–26	Première Ligue	0	0	0	0	—		—		0	0
Career total			53	7	4	0	2	1	2	0	61	8
