= Saori Takarada =

Japanese footballer

Personal information
- Date of birth: 27 December 1999 (age 26)
- Place of birth: Tateyama, Toyama, Japan
- Height: 1.69 m (5 ft 7 in)
- Position: Midfielder

Team information
- Current team: Cerezo Osaka Sakai
- Number: 11

Youth career
- 2012–2017: Cerezo Osaka Sakai

Senior career*
Years	Team	Apps	(Gls)
2013–2020	Cerezo Osaka Sakai	143	(56)
2021	Washington Spirit	10	(0)
2022–2023	Linköpings FC	51	(5)
2024–2025	Leicester City	33	(3)
2025-	Cerezo Osaka	22	(1)

International career^{‡}
2016	Japan U-17	5	(2)
2018	Japan U-20	6	(5)
2019–	Japan	29	(7)
Medal record
Representing Japan
FIFA U-20 Women's World Cup
Gold medal – first place	2018 France
AFC U-19 Women's Championship
Gold medal – first place	2017 China
FIFA U-17 Women's World Cup
Silver medal – second place	2016 Jordan
AFC U-16 Women's Championship
Silver medal – second place	2015 China
- * Club domestic league appearances and goals as of 1 June 2026 (UTC) ‡ National team caps and goals as of 30 September 2026 (UTC)

Saori Takarada (宝田 沙織, Takarada Saori; IPA: [takaɾaꜜda saoɾi]; born 27 December 1999) is a Japanese professional footballer who plays as a midfielder for WE League club Cerezo Osaka Sakai and the Japan national team. She previously played for Washington Spirit, Linköpings FC and Leicester City

== Early life ==
Takarada was born in Toyama Prefecture on 27 December 1999.

== Club career ==
=== Cerezo Osaka Sakai Ladies ===
In 2013, Takarada joined Nadeshiko League club Cerezo Osaka Sakai. She scored 44 goals in 110 appearances for the club and helped the club gain promotion to the top flight of the Nadeshiko League in 2019. During the 2019 season, Takarada scored 2 goals in 18 appearances for Cerezo and helped the team to a fourth-place finish. She played both as a forward and as a midfielder for Cerezo.

=== Washington Spirit ===
On 1 December 2020, Takarada signed a contract with the Washington Spirit for the 2021 and 2022 seasons. Her Japanese national team teammate Kumi Yokoyama signed with the Spirit in 2019. Takarada reported to the Spirit's preseason training camp in February 2021.

=== Linköping FC ===
On January 6, 2022, it was announced that Takarada would transfer to the Swedish Damalsvenskan club Linköping FC.

=== Leicester City ===
On 8 December 2023, it was announced that Takarada would sign a pre-contract with Women's Super League club Leicester City. She made her competitive debut for the club on 14 January 2024 in the fourth round of the FA Cup tie against Derby County. She scored her first competitive goal for the club on 11 February 2024 in a FA Cup match against Birmingham City

== International career ==
=== Youth ===
In 2016, Takarada was named to the Japan U-17 national team roster for the 2016 U-17 World Cup. She played in 5 matches and scored 2 goals, helping Japan to a 2nd place finish.

In 2018, Takarada played for the Japan U-20 national team at the 2018 U-20 World Cup. She played in all 6 matches and scored 5 goals and recorded 3 assists. Takarada scored the game-winning goal for Japan in the tournament final against Spain, leading Japan to the championship. She earned the Silver Ball and Bronze Boot for her performance in the tournament. Takarada also won the 2018 Asian Young Footballer of the Year award in 2018.

=== Senior ===
Takarada was named to the Japanese national team for the 2019 World Cup after Riko Ueki withdrew due to injury in May 2019. She served as a substitute for Japan during the World Cup, appearing in three of Japan's four games.

On 18 June 2021, she was included in the Japan squad for the 2020 Summer Olympics.

On 7 January 2022, Takarada was called up to the 2022 AFC Women's Asian Cup squad.

== Career statistics ==
=== Club ===
As of match played 18 May 2024

Appearances and goals by club, season and competition
Club	Season	League			National cup (Note: Includes Empress's Cup, Svenska Cupen)		League cup (Note: Includes Nadeshiko League Cup, NWSL Challenge Cup, FA Women's League Cup)		Continental (Note: Includes UEFA Women's Champions League)		Total	
Club	Season	Division	Apps	Goals	Apps	Goals	Apps	Goals	Apps	Goals	Apps	Goals
Cerezo Osaka Sakai	2013	Nadeshiko Challenge League	21	2	1	0	—		—		22	2
Cerezo Osaka Sakai	2014	Nadeshiko Challenge League	21	0	0	0	—		—		21	0
Cerezo Osaka Sakai	2015	Nadeshiko Challenge League	18	9	0	0	—		—		18	9
Cerezo Osaka Sakai	2016	Nadeshiko League 2	14	7	1	0	8	3	—		23	10
Cerezo Osaka Sakai	2017	Nadeshiko League 2	18	22	2	1	9	7	—		29	30
Cerezo Osaka Sakai	2018	Nadeshiko League	18	4	2	1	8	0	—		28	5
Cerezo Osaka Sakai	2019	Nadeshiko League 2	15	10	0	0	6	4	—		21	14
Cerezo Osaka Sakai	2020	Nadeshiko League	18	2	3	0	—		—		21	2
Cerezo Osaka Sakai	Total		143	56	9	2	31	14	—		183	72
Washington Spirit	2021	National Women's Soccer League	10	0	—		3	0	—		13	0
Linköping FC	2022	Damallsvenskan	25	3	3	0	—		—		28	3
Linköping FC	2023	Damallsvenskan	26	2	4	1	—		2	0	32	3
Linköping FC	Total		51	5	7	1	—		2	0	60	6
Leicester City	2023–24	Women's Super League	12	1	4	1	1	0	—		17	1
Career total			216	61	20	4	35	14	2	0	273	79

=== International ===
As of match played 21 September 2026

Appearances and goals by national team and year
National Team	Year	Apps	Goals
Japan	2019	3	0
Japan	2021	6	1
Japan	2022	10	0
Japan	2023	2	0
Japan	2025	3	0
Japan	2026	5	6
Total		29	7

Scores and results list Japan's goal tally first, score column indicates score after each Takarada goal.

List of international goals scored by Saori Takarada
No.	Date	Venue	Opponent	Score	Result	Competition	Ref.
1	11 June 2021	Edion Stadium Hiroshima, Hiroshima, Japan	Ukraine	5–0	8–0	Friendly	
2	14 September 2026	Shizuoka Stadium, Fukuroi, Japan	Thailand	5–0	8–0	2026 Asian Games	
3	14 September 2026	Shizuoka Stadium, Fukuroi, Japan	Thailand	6–0	8–0	2026 Asian Games	
4	14 September 2026	Shizuoka Stadium, Fukuroi, Japan	Thailand	7–0	8–0	2026 Asian Games	
5	21 September 2026	Shizuoka Stadium, Fukuroi, Japan	Chinese Taipei	1–0	4–0	2026 Asian Games	
6	25 September 2026	Shizuoka Stadium, Fukuroi, Japan	Philippines	1–0	4–0	2026 Asian Games	
7	25 September 2026	Shizuoka Stadium, Fukuroi, Japan	Philippines	3–0	4–0	2026 Asian Games	

== Honours ==
Cereza Osaka Sakai

- Nadeshiko League Cup Division 2: 2017, 2019

Japan

- EAFF E-1 Football Championship: 2022

Japan U20

- FIFA U-20 Women's World Cup: 2018
- AFC U-19 Women's Championship: 2017

Japan U17

- FIFA U-17 Women's World Cup: 2016
- AFC U-16 Women's Championship: 2015

Individual

- Silver Ball, 2018 U-20 World Cup
- Bronze Boot, 2018 U-20 World Cup
- Asian Young Footballer of the Year: 2018
