= Noémie Mouchon =

French footballer (born 2003)

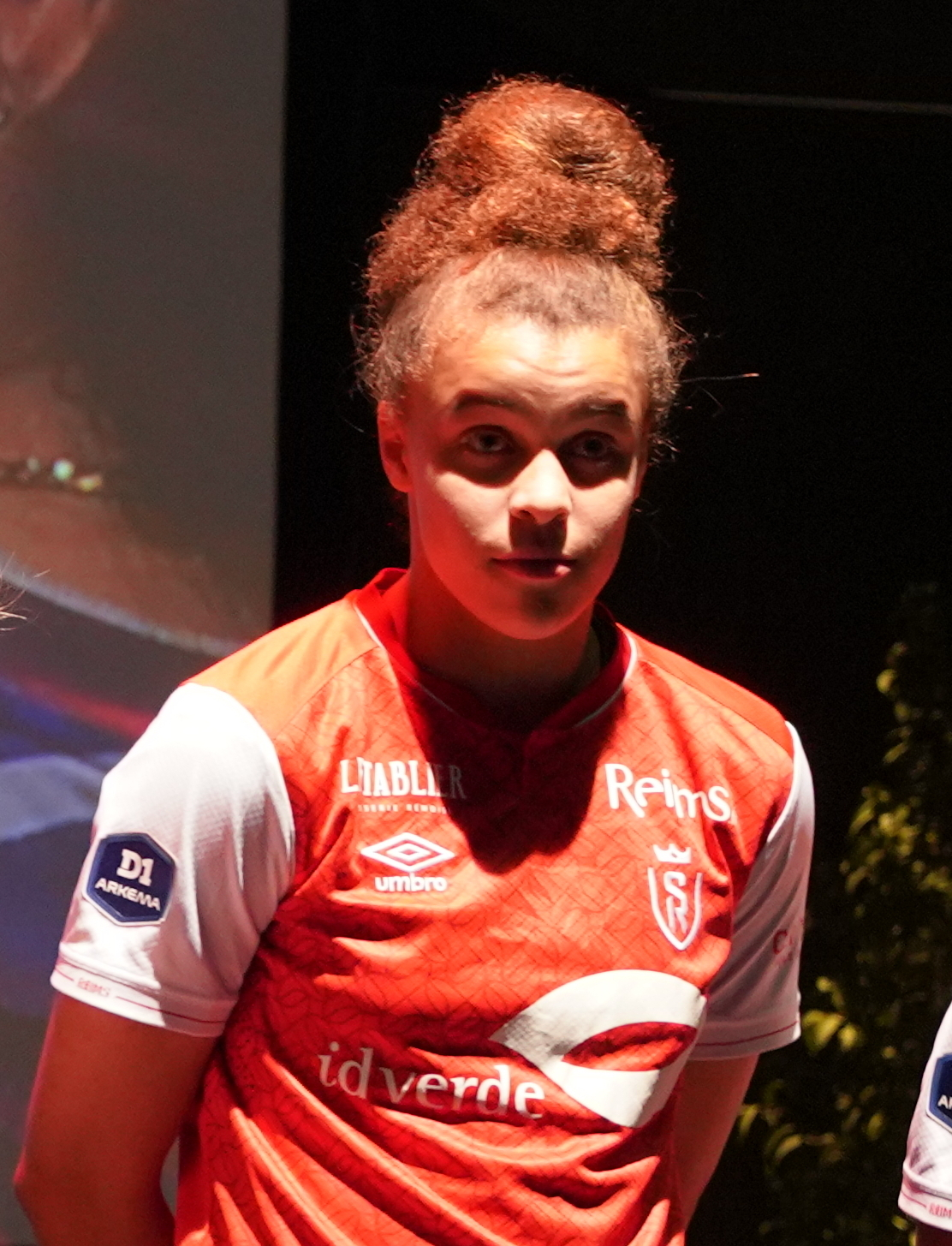
- Mouchon with Reims in 2024

Personal information
- Date of birth: 6 June 2003 (age 23)
- Place of birth: Lille, France
- Height: 1.76 m (5 ft 9 in)
- Position: Forward

Team information
- Current team: Everton
- Number: 17

Youth career
- 2012: FC Templemars-Vendeville
- 2012–2013: JS Wavrin Don
- 2013–2014: FC Santes
- 2014–2018: ES d'Ennequin
- 2018–2019: Lille

Senior career*
Years	Team	Apps	(Gls)
2019–2023	Lille	53	(27)
2023–2024	Reims	20	(9)
2024–2026	Leicester City	15	(2)
2026–	Everton	0	(0)

International career^{‡}
2019	France U16	4	(1)
2019–2020	France U17	5	(4)
2021–2022	France U19	7	(2)
2021	France U20	3	(0)
2022–	France U23	11	(1)
- * Club domestic league appearances and goals as of 29 March 2026 ‡ National team caps and goals as of 16 April 2026

Noémie Mouchon (French: [nɔ.e.mi mu.ʃɔ̃]; born 6 June 2003) is a French professional footballer who plays as a forward for Women's Super League club Everton. She previously played for Reims.

== Career ==
On 14 July 2026, Mouchon joined Everton.

== International career ==
Mouchon has represented France at youth level.

== Honours ==
Individual

- Première Ligue Player of the Month: April 2024
