= Julie Thibaud =

French footballer (born 1998)

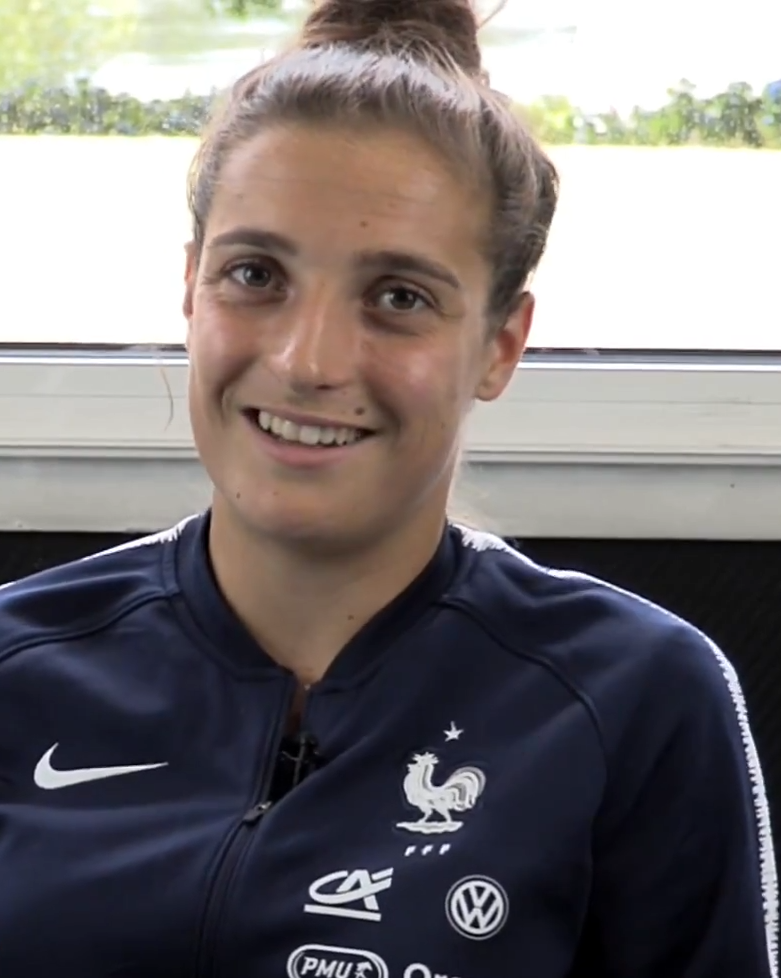
- Thibaud in 2018

Personal information
- Full name: Julie Martine Thibaud
- Date of birth: 20 April 1998 (age 28)
- Place of birth: Niort, France
- Height: 1.67 m (5 ft 6 in)
- Position: Centre-back

Team information
- Current team: Marseille

Youth career
- 2005–2013: AS Échiré Saint-Gelais
- 2013–2016: Soyaux

Senior career*
Years	Team	Apps	(Gls)
2014–2017	Soyaux	38	(1)
2017–2023	Bordeaux	88	(2)
2023–2026	Leicester City	59	(1)
2026–	Marseille	0	(0)

International career
2016–2018	France U19	15	(3)
2017–2018	France U20	15	(0)
2019–2022	France U23	6	(1)
2023	France	3	(0)
Medal record
Representing France
Women's football
UEFA Women's Under-19 Championship
Winner	2016 Slovakia
- * Club domestic league appearances and goals as of 10:46, 10 August 2026 (UTC)

Julie Martine Thibaud (French: [ʒyli maʁtin tibo]; born 20 April 1998) is a French professional footballer who plays as a centre-back for Première Ligue club Marseille.

== Career ==
Thibaud started playing football at a tiny club called AS Échiré Saint-Gelais in Saint-Gelais, but she had to move aged 15, as her club did not have any women's team and she had been playing with the boys until then. She then joined ASJ Soyaux, before going to the FC Girondins de Bordeaux in 2017.

Thibaud was called up to the France national team for the first time by Corinne Diacre on 10 September 2020.

On 31 August 2023, Thibaud signed for Women's Super League side Leicester City on a two-year deal.

On 9 August 2026, Thibaud joined Première Ligue side Marseille for an undisclosed fee.

== Honours ==
France U19

- UEFA Women's Under-19 Championship: 2016
