= Sophie Howard (footballer) =

Scottish footballer

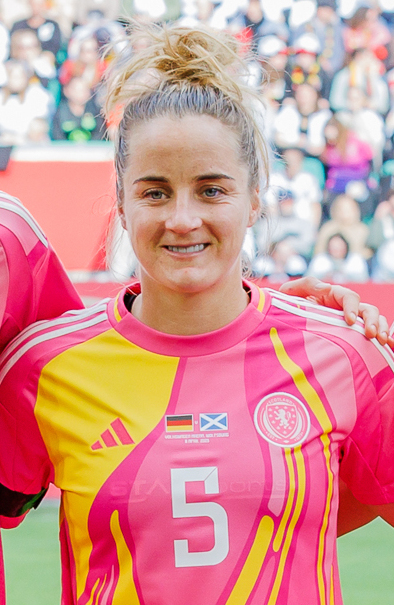
- Howard with Scotland in 2025

Personal information
- Full name: Sophie Louise Howard
- Date of birth: 17 September 1993 (age 33)
- Place of birth: Hanau, Germany
- Height: 1.75 m (5 ft 9 in)
- Position: Defender

Team information
- Current team: Como
- Number: 5

Youth career
- Sportfreunde Oberau
- SV Phönix Düdelsheim

College career
Years	Team	Apps	(Gls)
2012–2014	UCF Knights	63	(3)

Senior career*
Years	Team	Apps	(Gls)
2009–2012	1899 Hoffenheim	42	(1)
2013	Colorado Rapids Women		
2014–2015	Colorado Pride		
2015–2018	1899 Hoffenheim	63	(1)
2018–2020	Reading	17	(0)
2020–2025	Leicester City	100	(2)
2025–	Como	0	(0)

International career^{‡}
2012	Germany U20	2	(0)
2017–	Scotland	67	(4)
- * Club domestic league appearances and goals as of 9 February 2025 ‡ National team caps and goals as of 15 October 2026

Sophie Louise Howard (born 17 September 1993) is a footballer who plays as a defender for Serie A club Como. Born in Germany, she has been a member of the Scotland national team since 2017.

== College career ==
Howard joined UCF Knights in September 2012 and scored her first goal in her fifth appearance. At the end of her first season, Howard was named to the 2012 All-Conference Freshman Team, after three goals and two assists. She was also named to the 2013 American Athletic Conference All-Tournament Team and the 2014 AAC Second Team, and graduated with a bachelor's degree in sports science in 2015 with cum laude honors.

== Club career ==
Howard joined German club 1899 Hoffenheim in 2009. During her time at the club she played 17 regional league games, 42 second division games, and 8 cup games until 2012.

In July 2015, Howard was named in the W-League Western All-Conference team, after scoring one goal in nine games for Colorado Pride.

After finishing her education at University of Central Florida, Howard returned to Germany with 1899 Hoffenheim, who announced her signing for the 2015–16 Frauen-Bundesliga season in February 2015.

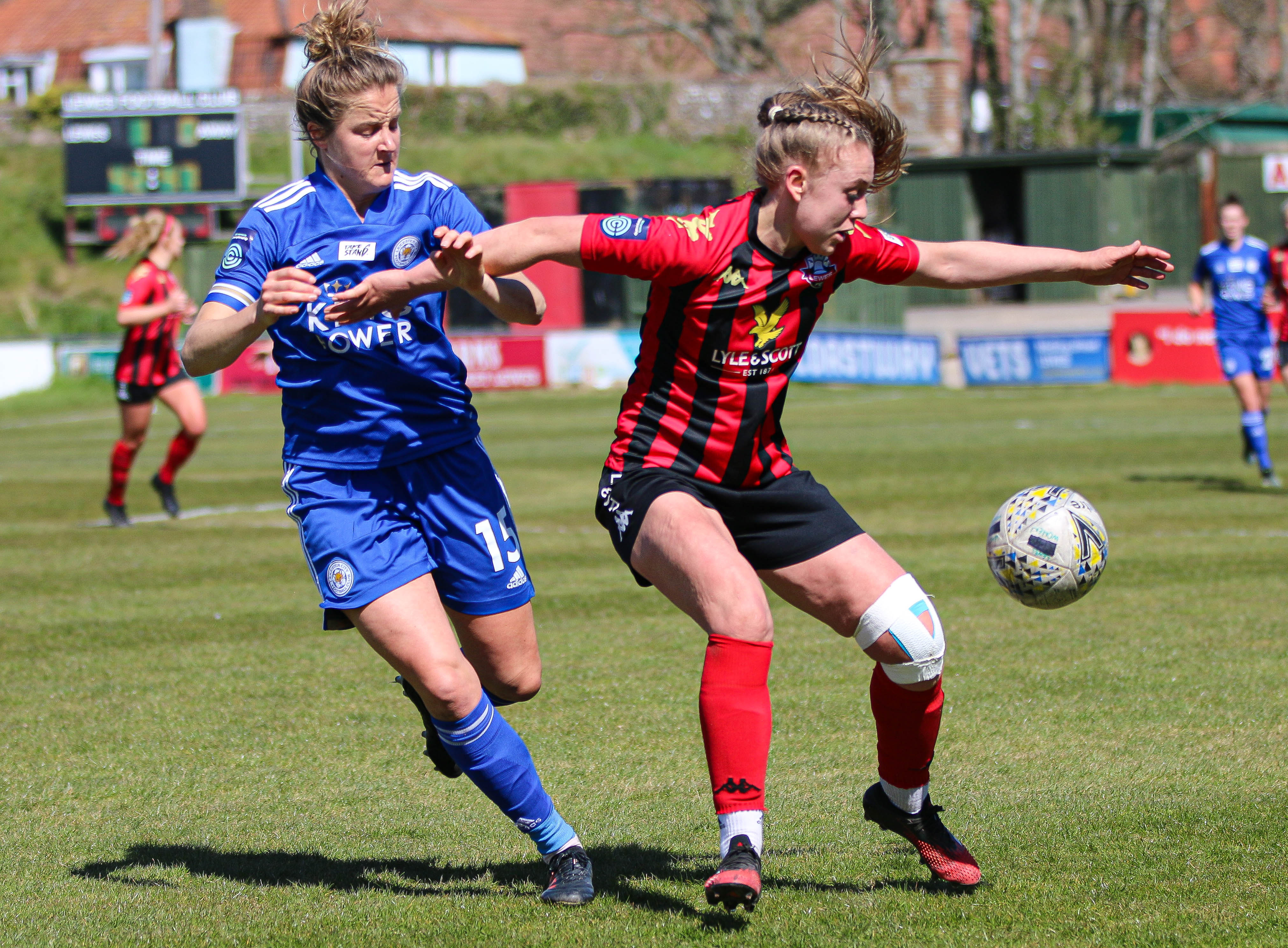
Howard (15) with Leicester City in April 2021

In July 2018, Howard joined English club Reading. In June 2020, Reading announced that Howard had left the club at the conclusion of her contract. Two months later, in August, Howard signed for Leicester City ahead of the 2020–21 FA Women's Championship season. She helped the club top the Championship comfortably, sitting eight points ahead of second-placed Durham, and get promoted to the 2021–22 FA WSL. During the season, Howard was a regular starter and continued to be a key player for Leicester City. In 2024, Howard became one of two players to make 100 appearances for the club.

== International career ==
Howard played twice for the Germany U20 national team in 2012. She was named in Germany's squad for the 2012 FIFA U-20 Women's World Cup in Japan, but did not get to play in any matches. In 2016 she was called into a training camp for England's new "Next Gen" team. She said: "Although I was born and brought up in Germany it's always been my ambition to play for England, and hopefully I’ve now taken my first step."

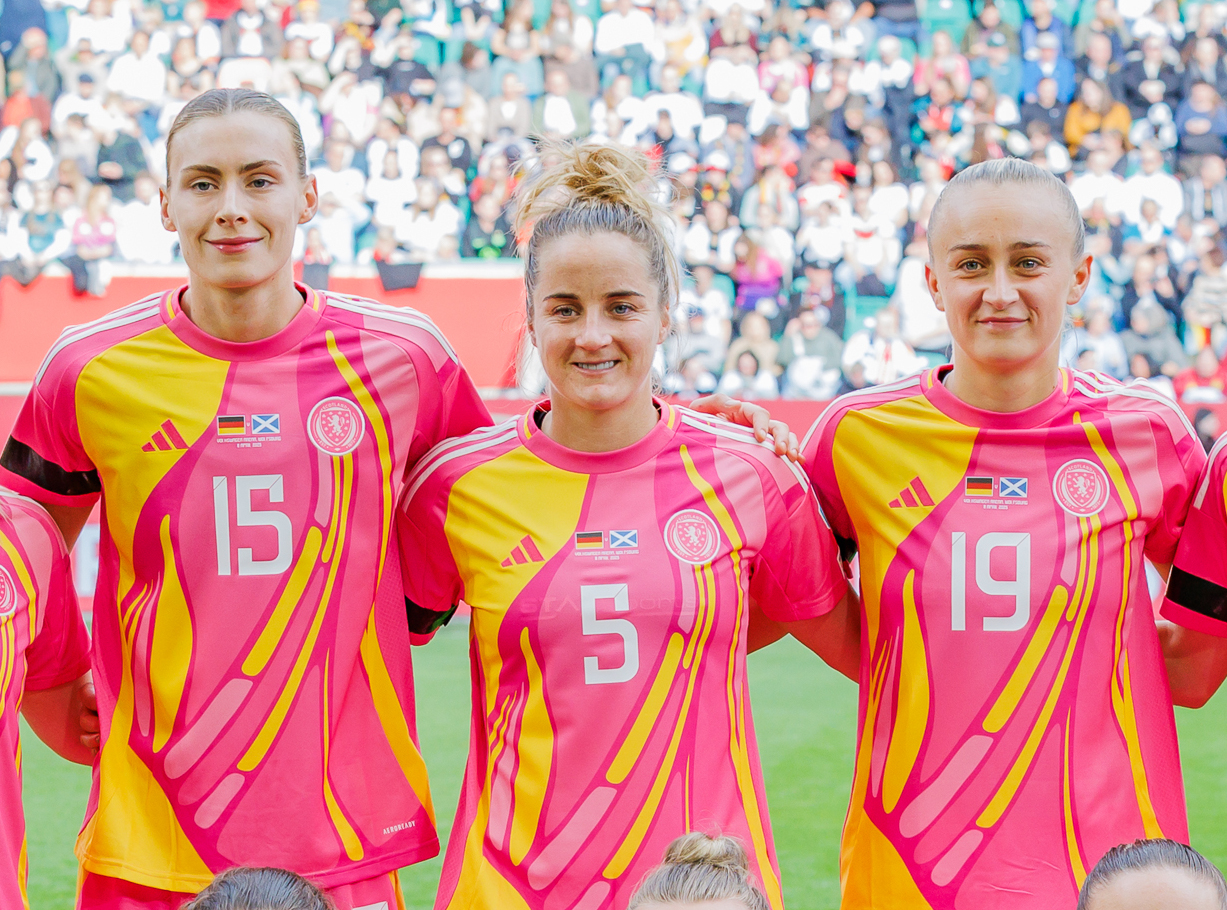
Howard (centre, with Jenna Clark and Lauren Davidson) lining up for Scotland against Howard's birth nation Germany, 2025

In March 2017 she was called up into the Scotland national team. The Scots had three injured defenders and were allowed to pick Howard because her grandfather is Scottish. She made her senior international debut on 11 April 2017, as a 64th-minute substitute in a 5–0 friendly defeat by Belgium in Leuven. In May 2019, Howard scored her first goal for the national team, heading in the winning goal in a 3–2 victory over Jamaica.

== Personal life ==
Howard was born in the German town Hanau to a Scottish mother and English father.

== Career statistics ==
=== International appearances ===
Scotland statistics accurate as of match played 13 October 2026.

Year	Scotland	
Year	Apps	Goals
2017	4	0
2018	8	0
2019	4	1
2020	3	0
2021	5	0
2022	9	0
2023	11	2
2024	12	1
2025	8	0
2026	3	0
Total	67	4

=== International goals ===
Scores and results list Scotland's goal tally first, score column indicates score after each Howard goal.

List of international goals scored by Sophie Howard
No.	Date	Venue	Opponent	Score	Result	Competition
1	28 May 2019	Hampden Park, Glasgow, Scotland	Jamaica	3–2	3–2	Friendly
2	21 February 2023	Pinatar Arena, San Pedro del Pinatar, Spain	Wales	1–0	1–1	2023 Pinatar Cup
3	26 September 2023	Hampden Park, Glasgow, Scotland	Belgium	1–1	1–1	2023–24 UEFA Women's Nations League
4	9 April 2024	Hampden Park, Glasgow, Scotland	Slovakia	1–0	1–0	UEFA Women's Euro 2025 qualifying
