= Shannon O'Brien (footballer) =

English association football player

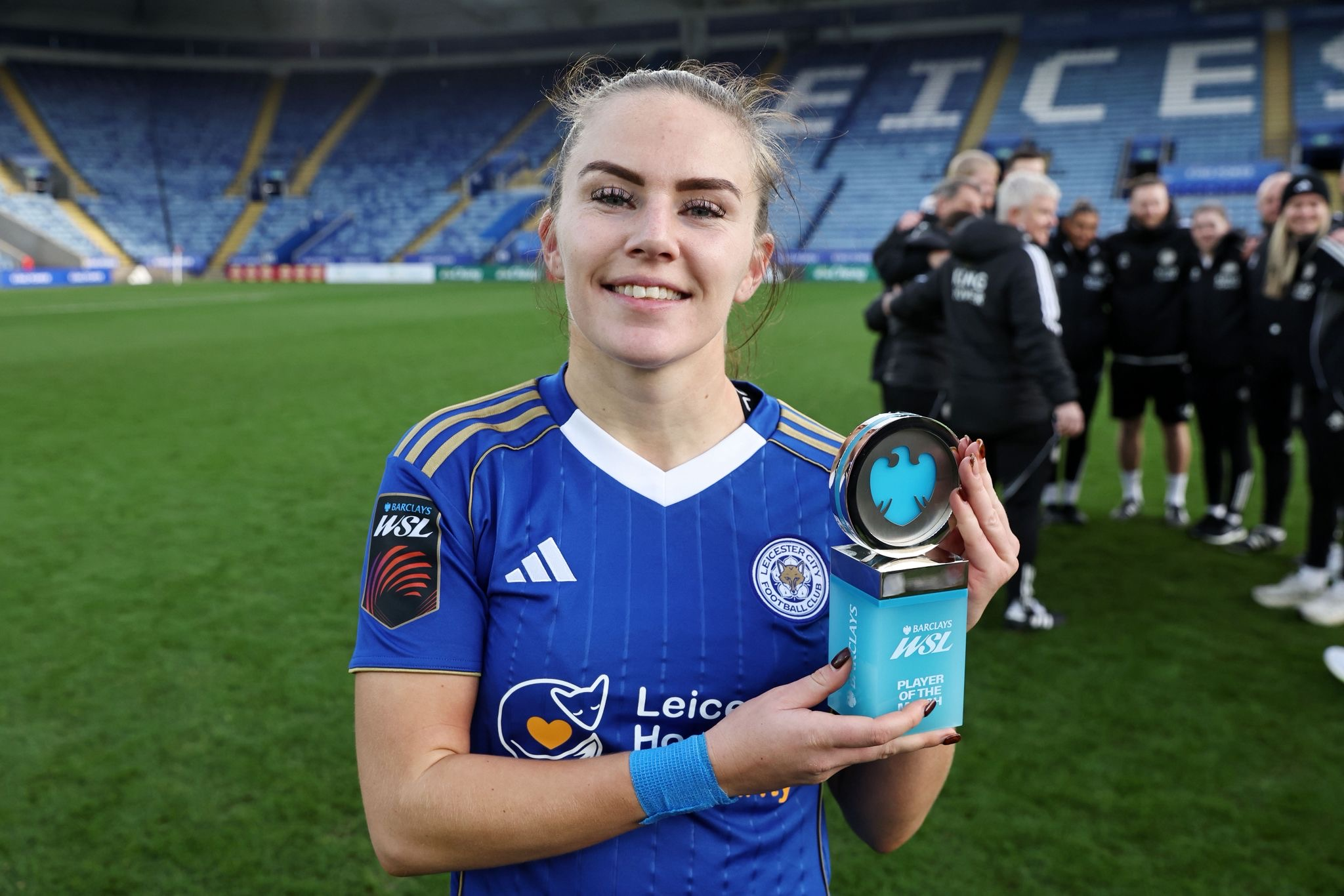

Personal information
- Full name: Shannon Kayleigh O'Brien
- Date of birth: 5 October 2001 (age 25)
- Place of birth: Coventry, England
- Height: 1.71 m (5 ft 7 in)
- Position: Forward

Team information
- Current team: Crystal Palace

Youth career
- Aston Villa

Senior career*
Years	Team	Apps	(Gls)
2018–2021	Coventry United	21	(6)
2021–2026	Leicester City	76	(12)
2026–	Crystal Palace	0	(0)

International career^{‡}
2022–2024	England U23	6	(0)
- * Club domestic league appearances and goals as of 17:45, 31 May 2026 (UTC) ‡ National team caps and goals as of 17:45, 31 May 2026 (UTC)

Shannon Kayleigh O'Brien (born 5 October 2001) is an English professional footballer who plays as a forward for Women's Super League club Crystal Palace.

== Club career ==
Born and raised in Coventry, O'Brien began her football career with Aston Villa's youth team.

=== Coventry United ===
She joined Coventry United in 2018, scoring four goals in 11 appearances as the team won the 2018–19 FA Women's National League Southern Division. O'Brien continued to play with Coventry United in the FA Women's Championship, before transferring to Leicester City in January 2021.

=== Leicester City ===
Between her transfer and the end of the season, O'Brien contributed three goals in nine appearances across all competitions for Leicester as the team secured promotion to the Women's Super League. She finished the season as Leicester's joint-top goalscorer.

In 2024, O'Brien signed a contract extension with the club that would extend her tenure until at least summer 2025.

O'Brien was again the club's top goalscorer in the 2025–26 Women's Super League, but Leicester finished bottom of the league table and were relegated to the Women's Super League 2 following playoff defeat to Charlton Athletic. Her penalty during the playoff penalty shootout was saved by Sophie Whitehouse.

=== Crystal Palace ===
On 30 July 2026, O'Brien joined newly-promoted WSL side Crystal Palace on a three-year contract.

== International career ==
Despite her conspicuously Irish name, O'Brien is not eligible to play for the Republic of Ireland women's national football team.

In February 2022, she received her first call up to the England women's national under-23 football team, making her debut in a 0–3 win over the Netherlands under-23 team. She was most recently called up to the U23 squad in 2024.
