= Emilia Pelgander =

Swedish footballer (born 2004)

Personal information
- Full name: Emilia Helena Pelgander
- Date of birth: 3 March 2004 (age 22)
- Position: Midfielder

Team information
- Current team: Leicester City
- Number: 18

Senior career*
Years	Team	Apps	(Gls)
2020–2023	KIF Örebro DFF	72	(5)
2023–	Leicester City	18	(0)
2025	→ FC Rosengård (loan)	25	(0)
2026	→ HB Køge (loan)	2	(0)

International career^{‡}
–2021	Sweden U17	4	(0)
2021–2023	Sweden U19	24	(1)
2023–	Sweden U23	20	(0)
- * Club domestic league appearances and goals as of 25 October 2026 ‡ National team caps and goals as of 18:05, 31 March 2026 (UTC)

Emilia Helena Pelgander (born 3 March 2004) is a Swedish professional footballer who plays as a midfielder for Leicester City. She previously played for then-Damallsvenskan club KIF Örebro.

== Personal life ==
Elsa Pelgander is the younger sister of Emilia Pelgander, who is also a professional footballer.
