= CJ Bott =

New Zealand footballer (born 1995)

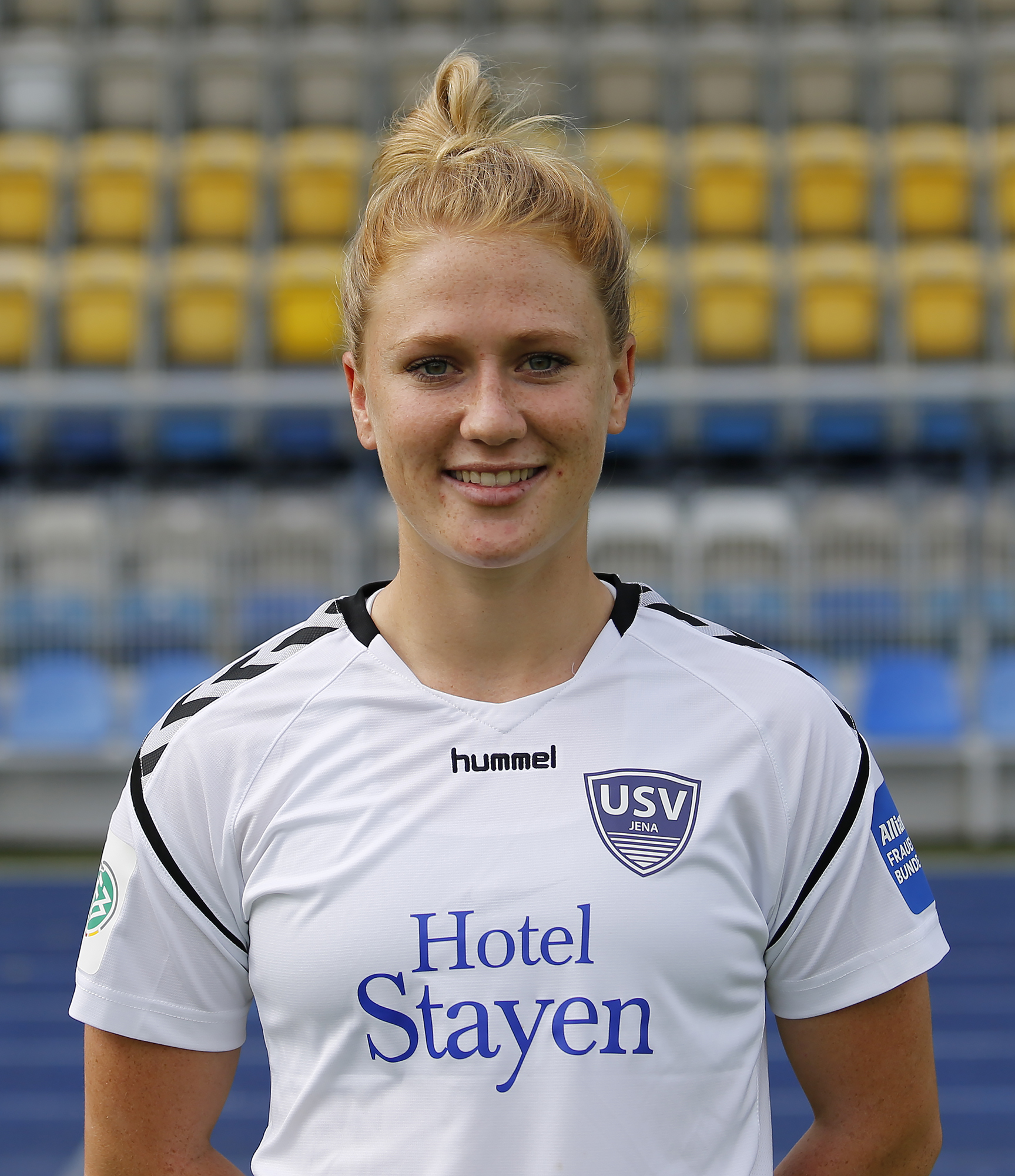
- Bott with FF USV Jena in 2017

Personal information
- Full name: Catherine Joan Bott
- Date of birth: 22 April 1995 (age 31)
- Place of birth: Wellington, New Zealand
- Height: 1.65 m (5 ft 5 in)
- Position: Left-back

Team information
- Current team: Wellington Phoenix
- Number: 2

Youth career
- Tawa AFC
- Lynn-Avon United
- Waterside Karori

Senior career*
Years	Team	Apps	(Gls)
2017–2018	FF USV Jena	15	(0)
2018–2019	Vittsjö GIK	30	(2)
2020–2021	Vålerenga	17	(2)
2022–2025	Leicester City	52	(0)
2025–	Wellington Phoenix	7	(0)

International career^{‡}
2012	New Zealand U-17	10	(1)
2012	New Zealand U-20	10	(0)
2014–	New Zealand	46	(3)
- * Club domestic league appearances and goals as of 26 January 2026 ‡ National team caps and goals as of 18 September 2024

Catherine Joan Bott (born 22 April 1995) is a New Zealand professional footballer who plays as a left-back for A-League Women club Wellington Phoenix and for the New Zealand women's national team. She has previously played with FF USV Jena, Vittsjö GIK, Vålerenga, and Leicester City.

== Club career ==
=== USV Jena ===
Bott made her league debut against Turbine Potsdam on 3 September 2017.

=== Vittsjö GIK ===
On 22 July 2018, Bott was announced at Vittsjö GIK. She made her league debut against Linköping on 5 August 2018. Bott signed a new contract on 23 November 2018. She scored her first league goal against Linköping on 28 April 2019, scoring in the 77th minute.

=== Vålerenga ===
Bott made her league debut against Avaldsnes IL on 12 September 2020. She scored her first league goal against Arna-Bjørnar on 6 December 2020, scoring in the 83rd minute.

=== Leicester City ===
In March 2022, Bott joined English club Leicester City. She made her league debut against Manchester United on 5 March 2022. On 5 July 2023, Bott signed a contract extension until 2025.

=== Wellington Phoenix ===
On 1 August 2025, Bott signed for the Wellington Phoenix of the A-League Women on a 2-year contract.

Bott announced her pregnancy in January 2026 and as a result she stepped down for the remainder of the 2025–26 season. She confirmed that she will still be with the team until the end of her contract in June 2027.

== International career ==
Bott was a member of the New Zealand U-17 side at the 2012 Women's World Championships, playing in two of New Zealand's group games.

At the 2014 Women's World Championships in Canada, Bott played in all three of New Zealand's group games and the quarter final match which they lost to Nigeria.

Bott made her senior début as a substitute in a 0–4 loss to Korea Republic on 10 March 2014.

She was part of New Zealand's squad for the 2015 FIFA Women's World Cup in Canada. She scored her first full international goal — a powerful strike from 35 metres — against Argentina at the 2019 Cup of Nations in Brisbane, Australia, on 3 March 2019.

She was also part of New Zealand's squad for the 2019 FIFA Women's World Cup in France, but broke her arm in the second game of the group stage against Canada.

On 25 June 2021, Bott was called up to the New Zealand squad for the delayed 2020 Summer Olympics.

Bott was called up to the New Zealand squad for the 2023 FIFA Women's World Cup.

On 4 July 2024, Bott was called up to the New Zealand squad for the 2024 Summer Olympics.

== International goals ==
No.	Date	Venue	Opponent	Score	Result	Competition
1.	3 March 2019	Suncorp Stadium, Brisbane, Australia	Argentina	2–0	2–0	2019 Cup of Nations
2.	2 September 2022	Dignity Health Sports Park, Carson, United States	Mexico	1–0	1–0	Friendly
3.	10 July 2023	McLean Park, Napier, New Zealand	Vietnam	1–0	2–0	Friendly
