= 2020–21 Leicester City W.F.C. season =

Leicester City
2020–21 season
- Owner: King Power International Group
- Chairman: Aiyawatt Srivaddhanaprabha
- Head Coach: Jonathan Morgan
- Stadium: Farley Way Stadium, Quorn
- Championship: 1st (promoted)
- FA Cup: Quarter-final
- League Cup: Semi-final
- Top goalscorer: League: Natasha Flint (17); All: Natasha Flint (21)
Home colours	Away colours	Third colours

The 2020–21 Leicester City W.F.C. season was the club's 17th season and their third in the FA Women's Championship, the second level of the women's football pyramid. Outside of the league, the club also contested two domestic cup competitions: the FA Cup and the League Cup.

It was their first under the official ownership of Leicester City F.C. parent group, King Power, having previously been an independent club with a formal affiliation to the Foxes. The takeover was confirmed on 22 August 2020 with the club immediately becoming fully-professional in the process. On 22 December 2020, the club announced the women's team would move in to the Belvoir Drive training ground before the end of the year after the men's team vacated the facility and relocated to a newly-constructed complex in Seagrave.

On 4 April 2021, Leicester City clinched the league title with a 2–0 win over London City Lionesses, their twelfth consecutive league victory dating back to 4–1 defeat at the hands of the same opposition on 1 November 2020. The result earned Leicester their first ever promotion to the top-flight FA WSL.

== Squad ==
As of 22 January 2021.

Note: Flags indicate national team as defined under FIFA eligibility rules; some limited exceptions apply. Players may hold more than one non-FIFA nationality.

No.	Pos.	Nation	Player
1	GK	ENG	Demi Lambourne
2	DF	ENG	Grace Riglar
3	DF	ENG	Sam Tierney
4	MF	ENG	Aimee Everett
5	DF	ENG	Holly Morgan (captain)
6	DF	ENG	Lia Cataldo
7	MF	ENG	Charlie Devlin
8	MF	ENG	Remi Allen
9	FW	ENG	Libby Smith
11	FW	ENG	Lachante Paul
12	MF	ENG	Charlotte Fleming
14	FW	NED	Esmee de Graaf
15	DF	SCO	Sophie Howard

No.	Pos.	Nation	Player
16	MF	ENG	Freya Thomas
17	FW	ENG	Paige Bailey-Gayle
18	DF	ENG	Sophie Barker
19	FW	ENG	Millie Farrow
20	FW	ENG	Natasha Flint
21	FW	ENG	Hannah Cain
22	DF	ENG	Ashleigh Plumptre
23	FW	ENG	Olivia Fergusson
27	MF	ENG	Shannon O'Brien
28	GK	ENG	Kirstie Levell
33	FW	ENG	Jess Camwell
48	GK	ENG	Sophie Harris

== FA Women's Championship ==
=== Results summary ===
Overall								Home						Away					
Pld	W	D	L	GF	GA	GD	Pts	W	D	L	GF	GA	GD	W	D	L	GF	GA	GD
20	16	2	2	54	16	+38	50	9	1	0	22	4	+18	7	1	2	32	12	+20

Last updated: 2 May 2021.
Source: FA WSL

=== Results ===
6 September 2020 1	Leicester City	3–0	Blackburn Rovers	Quorn
14:00	Devlin 17'; Flint 70', 82'; Barker (yellow card) 78'	Report	Jordan (yellow card) 5' (yellow-red card) 57'	Stadium: Farley Way Stadium; Attendance: Behind-closed-doors; Referee: Cristiana Hattersley

13 September 2020 2	Sheffield United	2–2	Leicester City	Chesterfield
14:00	Johnson 30', 66'; Wilson (yellow card) 75'	Report	Farrow 2'; Flint (yellow card) 37', (goal) 90' (pen.)	Stadium: Technique Stadium; Attendance: Behind-closed-doors

4 October 2020 3	Leicester City	2–2	Durham	Quorn
14:00	Devlin (yellow card) 45'; Allen 51'; Littlejohn (yellow card) 80'; Paul 90'	Report	Roberts 20'; Lambert (yellow card) 30'; Hepple 67'	Stadium: Farley Way Stadium; Attendance: Behind-closed-doors

11 October 2020 4	Leicester City	2–1	Liverpool	Quorn
14:00	Devlin (yellow card) 21'; Bailey-Gayle 23'; Paul 56'; Blanchard (yellow card) 90+8'	Report	Clarke 58'; Linnett (yellow card) 63'; Fahey (yellow card) 90'	Stadium: Farley Way Stadium; Attendance: Behind-closed-doors; Referee: Lucy-Ann Briggs

18 October 2020 5	Crystal Palace	1–4	Leicester City	Bromley
14:00	Khassal 4'; Taylor (red card) 42'	Report	Allen 45', 76'; Flint 45+2'; Paul 60'; Cataldo (yellow card) 76'	Stadium: Hayes Lane; Attendance: Behind-closed-doors

1 November 2020 6	London City Lionesses	4–1	Leicester City	Dartford
14:00	Primus 27', 50'; Agg 69'; Mason 81'	Report	Bailey-Gayle 23'	Stadium: Princes Park; Attendance: Behind-closed-doors; Referee: Aaron Farmer

8 November 2020 7	Leicester City	1–0	Lewes	Quorn
14:00	Blanchard (yellow card) 9'; Bailey-Gayle 30'	Report	Quayle (yellow card) 57'	Stadium: Farley Way Stadium; Attendance: Behind-closed-doors; Referee: Chloe-Ann Anderson

15 November 2020 8	Coventry United	1–9	Leicester City	Coventry
14:00	Gauntlett 3'	Report	Paul 11', 17'; Flint 20', 38'; Bailey-Gayle 48'; Allen 58'; Barker 64'; Littlejohn 70'; Farrow 88'	Stadium: Butts Park Arena; Attendance: Behind-closed-doors; Referee: Lucy Briggs

6 December 2020 9	Leicester City	3–0	London Bees	Quorn
14:00	Flint 8'; Tierney (yellow card) 9'; Bailey-Gayle 56'; Farrow 71'	Report	Estcourt (yellow card) 32'	Stadium: Farley Way Stadium; Attendance: Behind-closed-doors; Referee: Elizabeth Simms

13 December 2020 10	Charlton Athletic	0–2	Leicester City	Crayford
14:00	Rutherford (yellow card) 33' (yellow-red card) 34'	Report	Flint 39'; Allen 78'	Stadium: The Oakwood

20 December 2020 11	Blackburn Rovers	2–3	Leicester City	Bamber Bridge
14:00	Walters 54', 74'	Report	Flint 18', 59'; McDonald 24' (o.g.); Devlin (yellow card) 90+2'	Stadium: Irongate; Attendance: Behind-closed-doors; Referee: Declan Brown

10 January 2021 12	Leicester City	2–1	Sheffield United	Quorn
14:00	Plumptre 22'; Flint 80'	Report	Cusack (yellow card) 21'; Wilkinson 76'; Dixon (yellow card) 88'	Stadium: Farley Way Stadium; Attendance: Behind-closed-doors

17 January 2021 13	Liverpool	1–2	Leicester City	Birkenhead
14:00	Bo Kearns 10'; Babajide (yellow card) 30'; Lawley (red card) 47'	Report	Flint 43' (pen.); Devlin (yellow card) 71', (goal) 81'	Stadium: Prenton Park; Attendance: Behind-closed-doors; Referee: Chloe Ann-Anderson

28 February 2021 14	Leicester City	1–0	Crystal Palace	Quorn
14:00	Cain 35'	Report	Georgiou (yellow card) 57'	Stadium: Farley Way Stadium; Attendance: Behind-closed-doors

7 March 2021 15	London Bees	0–7	Leicester City	Canons Park
14:00		Report	Farrow 41'; Paul 44', 50'; O'Brien 62', 64'; Flint 67'; de Graaf 86'	Stadium: The Hive Stadium; Attendance: Behind-closed-doors

14 March 2021 16	Durham	0–2	Leicester City	Durham
12:00	Robson (yellow card) 42'; Lambert (yellow card) 45'; Holmes (yellow card) 81'; Hepple (yellow card) 89'	Report	Tierney 47', 60'; Farrow (yellow card) 90+2'; Bailey-Gayle (yellow card) 90+4'	Stadium: Maiden Castle; Attendance: Behind-closed-doors

28 March 2021 17	Leicester City	2–0	Coventry United	Quorn
14:00	Flint 45', 60'	Report	Orthodoxou (yellow card) 19'; Toussaint (yellow card) 72'	Stadium: Farley Way Stadium; Attendance: Behind-closed-doors; Referee: Lucy Oliver

4 April 2021 18	Leicester City	2–0	London City Lionesses	Quorn
14:00	Tierney (yellow card) 23', (goal) 69'; Flint 75'	Report	Agg (yellow card) 67'	Stadium: Farley Way Stadium; Attendance: Behind-closed-doors; Referee: Georgia Ball

25 April 2021 19	Lewes	1–0	Leicester City	Lewes
14:00	Umotong 20' (pen.)	Report		Stadium: The Dripping Pan; Attendance: Behind-closed-doors; Referee: Lauren Impey

2 May 2021 20	Leicester City	4–0	Charlton Athletic	Leicester
14:00	Flint 21'; Cain 32', 42'; Vassell 85' (o.g.)	Report		Stadium: King Power Stadium; Attendance: Behind-closed-doors; Referee: Amy Barber

=== League table ===
Pos	Team	Pld	W	D	L	GF	GA	GD	Pts	Qualification
1	Leicester City (C, P)	20	16	2	2	54	16	+38	50	Promotion to the WSL (Note: Dependent on obtaining a licence.)
2	Durham	20	12	6	2	34	15	+19	42	
3	Liverpool	20	11	6	3	37	15	+22	39	
4	Sheffield United	20	11	5	4	37	15	+22	38	
5	Lewes	20	8	4	8	19	22	−3	28	

Rules for classification: 1) Points; 2) Goal difference; 3) Number of goals scored
(C) Champions; (P) Promoted

== Women's FA Cup ==
As a member of the top two tiers, Leicester City will enter the FA Cup in the fourth round proper. Originally scheduled to take place on 31 January 2021, it was delayed due to COVID-19 restrictions. Due to the delay, the competition only reached the fifth round before the end of the season. It resumed the following season at the quarter-final stage on 29 September 2021.

18 April 2021 Fourth round	Leicester City	1–0	Liverpool	Quorn
14:00	Cain 72'	Report		Stadium: Farley Way Stadium; Attendance: Behind-closed-doors

16 May 2021 Fifth round	Manchester United	2–3	Leicester City	Leigh
12:00	Sigsworth 32'; Ross 59'	Report	O'Brien 45+1'; Cain 69'; Flint 71'	Stadium: Leigh Sports Village; Attendance: Behind-closed-doors; Referee: Rebecca Welch

29 September 2021 Quarter-final	Manchester City	6–0	Leicester City	Manchester
19:00	Shaw 46', 61', 85'; Losada 53'; Greenwood 71' (pen.); Angeldal 88'	Report		Stadium: Academy Stadium; Referee: Lucy May

== FA Women's League Cup ==
=== Group stage ===
4 November 2020 Group stage	Leicester City	5–2	Blackburn Rovers	Quorn
19:45	Flint 5', 32'; Farrow (yellow card) 44'; Devlin 78'; Bailey-Gayle 81'; McDonald 90+4' (o.g.)	Report	Hughes 51'; Newsham 57'	Stadium: Farley Way Stadium; Attendance: Behind-closed-doors; Referee: Georgia Ball

9 December 2020 Group stage	Birmingham City	0–0 (5–6 p)	Leicester City	Solihull
14:00		Report	Barker (yellow card) 35'	Stadium: Damson Park; Attendance: Behind-closed-doors; Referee: Sarah Garratt
	Penalties
	Murray (penalty scored); Walker (penalty scored); Hampton (penalty scored); Brougham (penalty scored); Corsie (penalty scored); Scofield (penalty missed)		(penalty scored) Allen; (penalty scored) Devlin; (penalty scored) Smith; (penalty scored) Plumptre; (penalty scored) Blanchard; (penalty scored) Everett
Note: Rescheduled from 18 November 2020 following positive COVID-19 test by Birmingham player.

Pos	Team	Pld	W	WPEN	LPEN	L	GF	GA	GD	Pts	Qualification	LEI	BIR	BLB
1	Leicester City	2	1	1	0	0	5	2	+3	5	Advanced to knock-out stage	—	—	5–2
2	Birmingham City	2	1	0	1	0	1	0	+1	4	Possible knock-out stage based on ranking	0–0	—	—
3	Blackburn Rovers	2	0	0	0	2	2	6	−4	0		—	0–1	—

Source: thefa.com
Rules for classification: 1) Points; 2) Goal difference; 3) Number of goals scored; 4) Number of wins; 5) Head-to-head record

=== Knockout stage ===
For the first time in club history, Leicester City reached the knockout stage of the League Cup.

14 January 2021 Quarter-final	Crystal Palace	0–1	Leicester City	Bromley
20:00		Report	Flint 89'	Stadium: Hayes Lane; Attendance: Behind-closed-doors

3 February 2021 Semi-final	Bristol City	1–0	Leicester City	Bath
19:30	Skeels 72'	Report	Barker (yellow card) 35'; Smith (yellow card) 65'	Stadium: Twerton Park; Attendance: Behind-closed-doors; Referee: Rebecca Welch

== Squad statistics ==
=== Appearances ===
As of 29 September 2021

Starting appearances are listed first, followed by substitute appearances after the + symbol where applicable.

No.	Pos	Nat	Player	Total		League		FA Cup		League Cup	
No.	Pos	Nat	Player	Apps	Goals	Apps	Goals	Apps	Goals	Apps	Goals
1	GK	(England) ENG	Demi Lambourne	2	0	0+1	0	1	0	0	0
2	DF	(England) ENG	Grace Riglar	4	0	2+1	0	0	0	0+1	0
3	DF	(England) ENG	Sam Tierney	26	3	17+2	3	3	0	4	0
4	MF	(England) ENG	Aimee Everett	9	0	2+6	0	0	0	0+1	0
5	DF	(England) ENG	Holly Morgan	2	0	2	0	0	0	0	0
6	DF	(England) ENG	Lia Cataldo	11	0	2+6	0	0+1	0	2	0
7	MF	(England) ENG	Charlie Devlin	24	3	15+3	2	1+1	0	2+2	1
8	MF	(England) ENG	Remi Allen	23	5	18	5	2	0	3	0
9	FW	(England) ENG	Libby Smith	19	0	10+4	0	2	0	3	0
11	FW	(England) ENG	Lachante Paul	24	7	14+4	7	1+1	0	3+1	0
12	MF	(England) ENG	Charlotte Fleming	2	0	0+1	0	0	0	0+1	0
14	FW	(Netherlands) NED	Esmee de Graaf	25	1	17+2	1	2	0	4	0
15	DF	(Scotland) SCO	Sophie Howard	19	0	14+1	0	3	0	1	0
16	MF	(England) ENG	Freya Thomas	8	0	0+6	0	0	0	2	0
17	FW	(England) ENG	Paige Bailey-Gayle	18	7	13+2	5+1	0	0	2+1	1
18	DF	(England) ENG	Sophie Barker	24	1	19	1	2	0	3	0
19	FW	(England) ENG	Millie Farrow	21	4	6+11	4	0+1	0	1+2	0
20	FW	(England) ENG	Natasha Flint	27	21	14+6	17	3	1	4	3
21	FW	(Wales) WAL	Hannah Cain	14	5	8+1	3	2+1	2	0+2	0
22	DF	(England) ENG	Ashleigh Plumptre	26	1	18+1	1	3	0	4	0
23	FW	(England) ENG	Olivia Fergusson	10	0	1+7	0	0+1	0	1	0
27	MF	(England) ENG	Shannon O'Brien	10	3	5+2	2	2+1	1	0	0
28	GK	(England) ENG	Kirstie Levell	26	0	20	0	2	0	4	0
33	FW	(England) ENG	Jess Camwell	1	0	0+1	0	0	0	0	0
48	GK	(England) ENG	Sophie Harris	0	0	0	0	0	0	0	0
Joined during 2021–22 season but competed in the postponed 2020–21 FA Cup:
8	MF	(England) ENG	Molly Pike	1	0	0	0	1	0	0	0
9	FW	(England) ENG	Jessica Sigsworth	1	0	0	0	1	0	0	0
23	DF	(England) ENG	Jemma Purfield	1	0	0	0	1	0	0	0
34	FW	(England) ENG	Mackenzie Smith	1	0	0	0	1	0	0	0
Players who appeared for the club but left during the season:
10	FW	(England) ENG	Annabel Blanchard	8	0	2+4	0	0	0	1+1	0
24	MF	(Republic of Ireland) IRL	Ruesha Littlejohn	7	1	1+5	1	0	0	0+1	0

== Transfers ==
=== Transfers in ===
Date	Position	Nationality	Name	From	Ref.
22 August 2020	GK	(England)	Kirstie Levell	(England) Everton	
22 August 2020	DF	(England)	Sophie Barker	(England) Sheffield United	
22 August 2020	DF	(Scotland)	Sophie Howard	(England) Reading	
22 August 2020	DF	(England)	Sam Tierney	(England) Sheffield United	
22 August 2020	MF	(England)	Remi Allen	(England) Reading	
22 August 2020	MF	(Republic of Ireland)	Ruesha Littlejohn	(England) West Ham United	
22 August 2020	FW	(England)	Hannah Cain	(England) Everton	
22 August 2020	FW	(Netherlands)	Esmee de Graaf	(England) West Ham United	
22 August 2020	FW	(England)	Millie Farrow	(England) Reading	
22 August 2020	FW	(England)	Olivia Fergusson	(England) Sheffield United	
22 August 2020	FW	(England)	Natasha Flint	(England) Blackburn Rovers	
7 January 2021	GK	(England)	Sophie Harris	(England) Watford	
21 January 2021	MF	(England)	Charlotte Fleming	(England) Chelsea	
22 January 2021	MF	(England)	Shannon O'Brien	(England) Coventry United	

=== Transfers out ===
Date	Position	Nationality	Name	To	Ref.
3 June 2020	MF	(England)	Annie Taylor	(England) Long Eaton United	
18 June 2020	DF	(England)	Lucy Johnson	(United States) Arizona State Sun Devils	
23 July 2020	DF	(England)	Georgia Popple	(England) Coventry United	
8 August 2020	DF	(Northern Ireland)	Natalie Johnson	(England) Sheffield United	
21 August 2020	DF	(Scotland)	Rachel Brown	(England) Nottingham Forest	
22 August 2020	DF	(England)	Hayley James	(England) Nottingham Forest	
22 August 2020	DF	(England)	Anneka Nuttall		
16 January 2021	MF	(Republic of Ireland)	Ruesha Littlejohn	(England) Birmingham City	
21 January 2021	FW	(England)	Annabel Blanchard	(England) Blackburn Rovers	
