= 2021–22 Leicester City W.F.C. season =

Leicester City
2021–22 season
- Owner: King Power International Group
- Chairman: Aiyawatt Srivaddhanaprabha
- Head Coach: Jonathan Morgan (until 25 November); Emile Heskey (interim, 25 November – 5 December); Lydia Bedford (from 6 December)
- Stadium: King Power Stadium, Leicester; Pirelli Stadium, Burton upon Trent
- FA WSL: 11th
- FA Cup: Fifth round
- League Cup: Group stage
- Top goalscorer: League: 4 players (2 goals); All: 3 players (3 goals)
- Highest home attendance: 4,473 (vs. Manchester United, 12 September)
- Lowest home attendance: 551 (vs. West Ham United, 13 February)
- Average home league attendance: 1,947
Home colours	Away colours	Third colours

The 2021–22 Leicester City W.F.C. season was the club's 18th season and their first in history as a top-flight team following promotion to the FA Women's Super League, the highest level of the women's football pyramid, at the end of the previous season. Outside of the league, the club also contested two domestic cup competitions: the FA Cup and the League Cup.

On 25 August 2021, the club announced the women's team would be moving to the King Power Stadium with Burton Albion's Pirelli Stadium serving as backup when fixtures clash with Leicester's men's team.

On 25 November 2021, Jonathan Morgan was relieved of his managerial duties having lost all eight league games to start the season. It ended a seven-year spell in which he guided the team from the fourth-tier FA Women's Midlands Division One to the FA WSL. Head of women's football development, Emile Heskey, was named caretaker on the same day. Heskey managed one game, against Manchester United in the League Cup, before England women's under-17 head coach Lydia Bedford took over permanently on 6 December 2021.

== Squad ==
As of 3 March 2022

Note: Flags indicate national team as defined under FIFA eligibility rules; some limited exceptions apply. Players may hold more than one non-FIFA nationality.

No.	Pos.	Nation	Player
1	GK	ENG	Demi Lambourne
3	DF	ENG	Sam Tierney
4	DF	NZL	C. J. Bott
5	DF	ENG	Abbie McManus
6	DF	ENG	Georgia Brougham
7	FW	ENG	Natasha Flint
8	MF	ENG	Molly Pike
9	FW	ENG	Jessica Sigsworth
10	MF	ENG	Charlie Devlin
11	FW	ENG	Lachante Paul
12	FW	ENG	Missy Goodwin
14	FW	NED	Esmee de Graaf
15	DF	SCO	Sophie Howard
16	MF	ENG	Freya Gregory (on loan from Aston Villa)
17	FW	JAM	Paige Bailey-Gayle

No.	Pos.	Nation	Player
18	DF	ENG	Sophie Barker
21	FW	WAL	Hannah Cain
22	DF	NGA	Ashleigh Plumptre
23	DF	ENG	Jemma Purfield
24	MF	ENG	Elysia Boddy
25	DF	WAL	Esther Morgan (on loan from Tottenham Hotspur)
27	MF	ENG	Shannon O'Brien
28	GK	ENG	Kirstie Levell
32	MF	ENG	Ava Baker
34	FW	ENG	Mackenzie Smith
37	FW	ENG	Alanta Brown
40	MF	ENG	Monique Robinson
44	MF	ENG	Connie Scofield
48	GK	ENG	Sophie Harris

== Preseason ==
31 July 2021 Friendly	Leicester City	–	Liverpool	Leicester
		Report		Stadium: Belvoir Drive; Attendance: Behind closed doors
Note: No official scoreline released

8 August 2021 Friendly	Leicester City	–	Chelsea	Leicester
		Report		Stadium: Belvoir Drive; Attendance: Behind closed doors
Note: No official scoreline released

15 August 2021 Friendly	Leicester City	–	Sheffield United	Leicester
		Report		Stadium: Belvoir Drive; Attendance: Behind closed doors
Note: No official scoreline released

22 August 2021 Friendly	Leicester City	–	Watford	Leicester
		Report		Stadium: Belvoir Drive; Attendance: Behind closed doors
Note: No official scoreline released

29 August 2021 Friendly	Leicester City	–	Tottenham Hotspur	Leicester
		Report		Stadium: Belvoir Drive; Attendance: Behind closed doors
Note: No official scoreline released

== FA Women's Super League ==
=== Results summary ===
Overall								Home						Away					
Pld	W	D	L	GF	GA	GD	Pts	W	D	L	GF	GA	GD	W	D	L	GF	GA	GD
22	4	1	17	14	53	−39	13	3	1	7	9	26	−17	1	0	10	5	27	−22

Last updated: 8 May 2022.
Source: FA WSL

=== Results by matchday ===
Round	1	2	3	4	5	6	7	8	9	10	11	12	13	14	15	16	17	18	19	20	21	22
Ground	A	H	A	H	A	H	A	H	A	H	A	H	H	A	H	A	A	H	H	A	H	A
Result	L	L	L	L	L	L	L	L	L	W	L	W	L	W	W	L	L	L	L	L	D	L
Position	8	9	10	10	12	12	12	12	12	11	12	11	11	11	10	11	11	11	11	11	11	11

A = Away; H = Home; W = Win; D = Draw; L = Loss

=== Results ===
4 September 2021 1	Aston Villa	2–1	Leicester City	Walsall
12:30	Hutton (yellow card) 36'; Asante (yellow card) 59'; Mayling 63'; Allen 64'	Report	Flint 39'; Tierney (yellow card) 79'; McManus (yellow card) 82'; Brougham (yellow card) 84'	Stadium: Bescot Stadium; Attendance: 741; Referee: Helen Conley

12 September 2021 2	Leicester City	1–3	Manchester United	Leicester
14:00	McManus 61'; Sigsworth (yellow card) 74'; Flint (yellow card) 86'	Report	Toone 36', (yellow card) 58'; Thorisdottir 47'; Thomas 71'	Stadium: King Power Stadium; Attendance: 4,473; Referee: Elizabeth Simms

26 September 2021 3	West Ham United	4–0	Leicester City	Dagenham
15:00	Yallop 26'; Walker 38'; Plumptre 45+1' (o.g.); Levell 81' (o.g.)	Report		Stadium: Victoria Road; Attendance: 1,128; Referee: Emily Heaslip

3 October 2021 4	Leicester City	0–2	Tottenham Hotspur	Leicester
14:00	Tierney (yellow card) 82'	Report	Williams 38'; Ale (yellow card) 59'; Addison 88'	Stadium: King Power Stadium; Attendance: 2,157; Referee: Abigail Byrne

10 October 2021 5	Chelsea	2–0	Leicester City	Kingston upon Thames
12:30	Harder 83'; Kirby 90+4'	Report	Purfield (yellow card) 31'	Stadium: Kingsmeadow; Attendance: 2,716; Referee: Lisa Benn

7 November 2021 6	Leicester City	1–4	Manchester City	Leicester
14:00	Sigsworth 1'; O'Brien (yellow card) 45+2'	Report	Weir 24'; Walsh 37'; Hemp 71'; Coombs 83'	Stadium: King Power Stadium; Attendance: 2,464; Referee: Helen Conley

14 November 2021 7	Brighton & Hove Albion	1–0	Leicester City	Crawley
14:00	Symonds 90+3'	Report	Bailey-Gayle (yellow card) 75'; Plumptre (yellow card) 85'	Stadium: Broadfield Stadium; Attendance: 3,566; Referee: Lisa Benn

21 November 2021 8	Leicester City	0–1	Everton	Burton upon Trent
14:00	Sigsworth (yellow card) 80'	Report	Magill 81'	Stadium: Pirelli Stadium; Attendance: 685; Referee: Lucy May

12 December 2021 9	Arsenal	4–0	Leicester City	Borehamwood
18:45	Nobbs 22', (yellow card) 90+3'; Miedema 34'; Maanum 81', 83'	Report	Sigsworth (yellow card) 3'; O'Brien (yellow card) 6'; Purfield (red card) 43'; Tierney (yellow card) 82'; Plumptre (yellow card) 86'	Stadium: Meadow Park; Attendance: 1,316; Referee: Emily Heaslip

19 December 2021 10	Leicester City	2–0	Birmingham City	Leicester
14:00	Howard 18'; Tierney 74'; Plumptre (yellow card) 84'; de Graaf (yellow card) 90+2'	Report	Finn (yellow card) 36'	Stadium: King Power Stadium; Attendance: 2,124; Referee: Lisa Benn

9 January 2022 11	Reading	1–0	Leicester City	Reading
14:00	Dowie 11'	Report	Purfield (yellow card) 36'; Tierney (yellow card) 72'	Stadium: Madejski Stadium; Attendance: 501; Referee: Louise Saunders

16 January 2022 12	Leicester City	1–0	Brighton & Hove Albion	Leicester
14:00	O'Brien 54'	Report		Stadium: King Power Stadium; Attendance: 1,667; Referee: Abigail Byrne

23 January 2022 13	Leicester City	1–2	Aston Villa	Burton upon Trent
14:00	Hampton 76' (o.g.)	Report	Purfield 4' (o.g.); Hayles (yellow card) 31'; Hampton (yellow card) 77'; Lehmann 90+3'	Stadium: Pirelli Stadium; Attendance: 616; Referee: Elizabeth Simms

6 February 2022 14	Birmingham City	1–2	Leicester City	Birmingham
14:00	Ramsey (red card) 26'; Lo. Quinn 85'	Report	Sigsworth 29' (pen.), (yellow card) 90+5'; Purfield 37'	Stadium: St Andrew's; Attendance: 810; Referee: Louise Saunders

13 February 2022 15	Leicester City	3–0	West Ham United	Burton upon Trent
14:00	Flint 2', (yellow card) 76'; Plumptre 9'; Gregory 50'; Devlin (yellow card) 81'; O'Brien (yellow card) 90+3'	Report		Stadium: Pirelli Stadium; Attendance: 551; Referee: Abigail Byrne

5 March 2022 16	Manchester United	4–0	Leicester City	Leigh
12:00	Thomas 17'; Russo 30'; Zelem 59', 63'	Report		Stadium: Leigh Sports Village; Attendance: 1,103; Referee: Amy Fearn

12 March 2022 17	Everton	3–2	Leicester City	Liverpool
17:30	Duggan 32'; Anvegård 40', 52'; George (yellow card) 76'	Report	Purfield 5'; Tierney 44'	Stadium: Walton Hall Park; Attendance: 574; Referee: Kirsty Dowle

27 March 2022 18	Leicester City	0–9	Chelsea	Leicester
15:00		Report	Reiten 3', 45+5'; Kerr 5', 47'; England 7', 28'; Nouwen 11'; James 88'; Fleming 90'	Stadium: King Power Stadium; Attendance: 2,278; Referee: Abigail Byrne

3 April 2022 19	Leicester City	0–5	Arsenal	Leicester
12:30	Tierney (yellow card) 38'; O'Brien (yellow card) 57'	Report	Mead 2'; Wubben-Moy (yellow card) 12'; McCabe (yellow card) 15'; Miedema 67', 75'; Plumptre 79' (o.g.); Heath 83'	Stadium: King Power Stadium; Attendance: 2,158; Referee: Rebecca Welch

24 April 2022 20	Manchester City	4–0	Leicester City	Manchester
14:00	Weir 16'; Hemp 43'; Blakstad 45+3'; Greenwood 63'	Report		Stadium: Academy Stadium; Attendance: 1,895; Referee: Louise Saunders

1 May 2022 21	Leicester City	0–0	Reading	Leicester
14:00		Report	Troelsgaard (yellow card) 41'	Stadium: King Power Stadium; Attendance: 2,244; Referee: Richie Watkins

8 May 2022 22	Tottenham Hotspur	1–0	Leicester City	Tottenham
12:00	Neville 49'; Williams (yellow card) 80'; Ale (yellow card) 84'	Report	Goodwin (yellow card) 58'; Tierney (yellow card) 86'	Stadium: Tottenham Hotspur Stadium; Attendance: 3,994; Referee: Kirsty Dowle

=== League table ===
Pos	Team	Pld	W	D	L	GF	GA	GD	Pts	Qualification or relegation
8	Reading	22	7	4	11	21	40	−19	25	
9	Aston Villa	22	6	3	13	13	40	−27	21	
10	Everton	22	5	5	12	18	41	−23	20	
11	Leicester City	22	4	1	17	14	53	−39	13	
12	Birmingham City (R)	22	3	2	17	15	51	−36	11	Relegation to the Championship

Source: FA WSL
Rules for classification: 1) Points; 2) Goal difference; 3) Number of goals scored.
(R) Relegated

== Women's FA Cup ==
As a member of the first tier, Leicester City entered the FA Cup in the fourth round proper.

30 January 2022 Fourth round	Tottenham Hotspur	1–3	Leicester City	Canons Park
14:00	Addison 61'	Report	O'Brien (yellow card) 39', (goal) 82'; Barker (yellow card) 49'; Broughton (yellow card) 64'; Howard 91'; McManus (yellow card) 120'; de Graaf 120+2'	Stadium: The Hive; Attendance: 596; Referee: Robert Whitton

26 February 2022 Fifth round	Chelsea	7–0	Leicester City	Kingston upon Thames
13:00	Bright (yellow card) 14'; Harder 24', 36'; Kerr 60', 82'; Ji 65'; Nouwen 79'; England 85'	Report	Howard (red card) 17'; Tierney (yellow card) 63'	Stadium: Kingsmeadow; Attendance: 2,723

== FA Women's League Cup ==
=== Group stage ===
3 November 2021 Group stage	Leicester City	1–3	Everton	Burton upon Trent
19:00	Plumptre 82'	Report	Anvegård 2'; Christiansen 39'; Gauvin 87'	Stadium: Pirelli Stadium

17 November 2021 Group stage	Durham	1–2	Leicester City	Durham
19:00	Holmes (red card) 43'; Crosthwaite 79'	Report	Tierney (yellow card) 33'; O'Brien 51'; Pike 56'	Stadium: Maiden Castle

5 December 2021 Group stage	Manchester United	2–2 (3–4 p)	Leicester City	Leigh
12:00	Galton (yellow card) 30'; Russo 49'; Zelem 81'	Report	Howard 32'; O'Brien (yellow card) 66'; Flint 79'	Stadium: Leigh Sports Village
	Penalties
	Toone (penalty scored); Mannion (penalty scored); Russo (penalty scored); Zelem (penalty missed); Bøe Risa (penalty missed)		(penalty scored) Sigsworth; (penalty scored) Flint; (penalty scored) McManus; (penalty missed) Purfield; (penalty scored) Brougham

15 December 2021 Group stage	Leicester City	P–P	Manchester City	Burton upon Trent
19:00				Stadium: Pirelli Stadium
Note: Postponed due to a COVID-19 outbreak at Manchester City

12 January 2022 Group stage	Leicester City	0–5	Manchester City	Burton upon Trent
19:00		Report	White 9'; Hemp 15', 34'; Stanway 16', 47'	Stadium: Pirelli Stadium
Note: Rescheduled from 15 December 2021

Pos	Team	Pld	W	WPEN	LPEN	L	GF	GA	GD	Pts	Qualification	MCI	MNU	EVE	LEI	DUR
1	Manchester City	4	3	0	0	1	14	3	+11	9	Advances to knock-out stage	—	—	5–1	—	3–0
2	Manchester United	4	2	1	1	0	8	5	+3	9	Possible knock-out stage based on ranking	2–1	—	—	2–2	—
3	Everton	4	2	0	0	2	5	8	−3	6		—	0–2	—	—	1–0
4	Leicester City	4	1	1	0	2	5	11	−6	5		0–5	—	1–3	—	—
5	Durham	4	0	0	1	3	3	8	−5	1		—	2–2	—	1–2	—

Source: thefa.com
Rules for classification: 1) Points; 2) Goal difference; 3) Number of goals scored; 4) Number of wins; 5) Head-to-head record

== Squad statistics ==
=== Appearances ===
As of 8 May 2022

Starting appearances are listed first, followed by substitute appearances after the + symbol where applicable.

No.	Pos	Nat	Player	Total		FA WSL		FA Cup		League Cup	
No.	Pos	Nat	Player	Apps	Goals	Apps	Goals	Apps	Goals	Apps	Goals
1	GK	(England) ENG	Demi Lambourne	19	0	14	0	2	0	3	0
3	DF	(England) ENG	Sam Tierney	27	2	21	2	1+1	0	3+1	0
4	DF	(New Zealand) NZL	C. J. Bott	2	0	0+2	0	0	0	0	0
5	DF	(England) ENG	Abbie McManus	24	1	18+1	1	2	0	3	0
6	DF	(England) ENG	Georgia Brougham	17	0	8+3	0	2	0	3+1	0
7	FW	(England) ENG	Natasha Flint	25	3	13+8	2	1	0	2+1	1
8	MF	(England) ENG	Molly Pike	26	1	20+1	0	2	0	2+1	1
9	FW	(England) ENG	Jessica Sigsworth	17	2	13	2	1	0	3	0
10	MF	(England) ENG	Charlie Devlin	8	0	0+6	0	0	0	0+2	0
11	FW	(England) ENG	Lachante Paul	2	0	1+1	0	0	0	0	0
12	FW	(England) ENG	Missy Goodwin	7	0	4+2	0	0+1	0	0	0
14	FW	(Netherlands) NED	Esmee de Graaf	27	1	19+2	0	1+1	1	4	0
15	DF	(Scotland) SCO	Sophie Howard	26	3	18+3	1	2	1	2+1	1
16	MF	(England) ENG	Freya Gregory	13	1	10+1	1	2	0	0	0
17	FW	(Jamaica) JAM	Paige Bailey-Gayle	14	0	5+7	0	0	0	0+2	0
18	DF	(England) ENG	Sophie Barker	18	0	8+5	0	1+1	0	2+1	0
21	FW	(Wales) WAL	Hannah Cain	4	0	4	0	0	0	0	0
22	DF	(Nigeria) NGA	Ashleigh Plumptre	24	2	20	1	1	0	3	1
23	DF	(England) ENG	Jemma Purfield	26	2	19+1	2	2	0	4	0
24	MF	(England) ENG	Elysia Boddy	2	0	0+2	0	0	0	0	0
25	DF	(Wales) WAL	Esther Morgan	2	0	0+2	0	0	0	0	0
27	MF	(England) ENG	Shannon O'Brien	26	3	21	1	2	1	3	1
28	GK	(England) ENG	Kirstie Levell	7	0	7	0	0	0	0	0
32	MF	(England) ENG	Ava Baker	4	0	0+2	0	0+1	0	1	0
34	FW	(England) ENG	Mackenzie Smith	3	0	0+3	0	0	0	0	0
37	FW	(England) ENG	Alanta Brown	1	0	0	0	0	0	1	0
40	MF	(England) ENG	Monique Robinson	2	0	0+1	0	0	0	1	0
44	MF	(England) ENG	Connie Scofield	2	0	0+1	0	0+1	0	0	0
48	GK	(England) ENG	Sophie Harris	2	0	1	0	0	0	1	0
Players away from the club on loan:
19	FW	(Scotland) SCO	Abbi Grant	2	0	1	0	0	0	1	0
20	MF	(Slovenia) SVN	Luana Zajmi	1	0	0	0	0	0	1	0
29	FW	(England) ENG	Jess Camwell	2	0	0	0	0	0	1+1	0

== Transfers ==
=== Transfers in ===
Date	Position	Nationality	Name	From	Ref.
16 July 2021	FW	(England)	Jessica Sigsworth	(England) Manchester United	
19 July 2021	DF	(England)	Jemma Purfield	(England) Bristol City	
20 July 2021	DF	(England)	Georgia Brougham	(England) Everton	
21 July 2021	FW	(Scotland)	Abbi Grant	(England) Birmingham City	
26 July 2021	MF	(England)	Molly Pike	(England) Everton	
27 July 2021	DF	(England)	Abbie McManus	(England) Manchester United	
23 August 2021	MF	(England)	Connie Scofield	(England) Birmingham City	
24 September 2021	MF	(Slovenia)	Luana Zajmi	(Slovenia) Pomurje	
7 January 2022	FW	(England)	Missy Goodwin	(England) Aston Villa	
5 February 2022	MF	(England)	Elysia Boddy	(England) Middlesbrough	
3 March 2022	DF	(New Zealand)	C. J. Bott	(Norway) Vålerenga	

=== Loans in ===
Date	Position	Nationality	Name	From	Until	Ref.
7 January 2022	MF	(England)	Freya Gregory	(England) Aston Villa	End of season	
1 February 2022	DF	(Wales)	Esther Morgan	(England) Tottenham Hotspur	End of season	
12 March 2022	GK	(Wales)	Safia Middleton-Patel	(England) Manchester United	12 March 2022 (Note: Emergency goalkeeper loan on non-contract terms)	

=== Transfers out ===
Date	Position	Nationality	Name	To	Ref.
30 June 2021	MF	(England)	Remi Allen	(England) Aston Villa	
30 June 2021	MF	(England)	Charlotte Fleming	(England) London City Lionesses	
30 June 2021	MF	(England)	Grace Riglar	(England) Coventry United	
30 June 2021	DF	(England)	Lia Cataldo	(England) Bristol City	
30 June 2021	MF	(England)	Freya Thomas	(England) Nottingham Forest	
30 June 2021	MF	(England)	Aimee Everett	(England) Crystal Palace	
30 June 2021	FW	(England)	Millie Farrow	(England) Crystal Palace	
30 June 2021	FW	(England)	Olivia Fergusson	(England) Coventry United	
30 June 2021	FW	(England)	Libby Smith	(England) Birmingham City	
29 July 2021	DF	(England)	Holly Morgan	Retired	

=== Loans out ===
Date	Position	Nationality	Name	To	Until	Ref.
26 January 2022	FW	(Scotland)	Abbi Grant	(Scotland) Glasgow City	End of season	
28 January 2022	MF	(Slovenia)	Luana Zajmi	(England) Blackburn Rovers	End of season	
15 February 2022	MF	(England)	Jess Camwell	(England) Derby County	End of season	
