= Safia Middleton-Patel =

Wales international footballer (born 2004)

Personal information
- Date of birth: 21 September 2004 (age 22)
- Place of birth: Wales
- Position: Goalkeeper

Team information
- Current team: Watford (on loan from Manchester United)
- Number: 39

Youth career
- –2020: Liverpool
- 2020–: Manchester United

Senior career*
Years	Team	Apps	(Gls)
2021–	Manchester United	1	(0)
2021	→ Blackburn Rovers (loan)	0	(0)
2022	→ Leicester City (loan)	0	(0)
2023	→ Coventry United (loan)	3	(0)
2023	→ Blackburn Rovers (loan)	1	(0)
2024	→ Watford (loan)	6	(0)
2026–	→ Watford (loan)	5	(0)

International career^{‡}
2019–2021	Wales U17	6	(0)
2020–2021	Wales U19	6	(0)
2023–	Wales	14	(0)
- * Club domestic league appearances and goals as of 4 October 2026 ‡ National team caps and goals as of 13 October 2026

Safia Middleton-Patel (born 21 September 2004) is a Welsh professional footballer who plays as a goalkeeper for Women's Super League 2 club Watford, on loan from WSL club Manchester United, and the Wales national team.

== Club career ==
=== Manchester United ===
Having made five appearances for Liverpool under-16s youth team, Middleton-Patel joined Women's Super League club Manchester United in summer 2020. During the 2021–22 season, she was part of the under-21 team that won the WSL Academy League and Academy Cup double. She was named to her first senior matchday squad for the club on 5 February 2022, a WSL match against Arsenal. She signed her first senior professional contract with the club in January 2023. On 21 August 2025, Middleton-Patel signed a new contract with Manchester United, keeping her at the club until June 2028.

==== Loan spells ====
In November 2021, Middleton-Patel joined Blackburn Rovers of the Women's Championship on dual registration terms. She was named to two matchday squads that month but did not make a senior appearance.

On 12 March 2022, she joined WSL club Leicester City on an emergency goalkeeper loan for an away trip to Everton following injuries to Demi Lambourne and Kirstie Levell. She was an unused substitute behind Sophie Harris as Leicester lost 3–2.

On 11 February 2023, Middleton-Patel joined Championship club Coventry United on an emergency goalkeeper loan for a home match against Blackburn Rovers. She made her senior debut the following day, starting as Coventry won 3–1. In total she played three matches, conceding nine goals.

On 26 April 2023, Middleton-Patel returned to Blackburn Rovers on an emergency loan deal. Four days later, she kept her first clean sheet in senior football as Blackburn beat Sunderland 1–0.

On 19 January 2024, she joined Championship club Watford on loan for the remainder of the 2023–24 season. She made a total of six appearances, keeping two clean sheets and conceding eight goals, as Watford finished last and were relegated.

Middleton-Patel was loaned to Watford again, this time for the full 2026–27 season, on 18 August 2026.

==== 2024–present: First-team debut ====
Following the summer 2024 departure of Mary Earps, Middleton-Patel assumed the role of backup behind Phallon Tullis-Joyce. On 11 December 2024, she made her Manchester United debut in the final group stage game of the 2024–25 Women's League Cup against Championship side Newcastle United, with United securing a 5–3 victory. Her next appearance for the club came in the 2025–26 season following an injury to Tullis-Joyce, in which she made her UEFA Women's Champions League debut in a 2–1 victory against Paris Saint-Germain on 12 November 2025. Four days later, she made her WSL debut in a 3–0 defeat against Manchester City.

== International career ==
=== Youth ===
Middleton-Patel represented Wales at under-17 and under-19, appearing during 2020 UEFA Women's Under-17 Championship qualification and 2022 UEFA Women's Under-17 Championship qualification as well as 2022 UEFA Women's Under-19 Championship qualification.

=== Senior ===
In September 2022, Middleton-Patel received her first senior Wales call-up for 2023 FIFA Women's World Cup qualifiers against Greece and Slovenia but did not appear. She was recalled to the squad during the next two windows, for two further qualifiers and a friendly but again did not appear for the team. On 15 February 2023, Middleton-Patel made her senior international debut, aged 18, when she started against the Philippines at the 2023 Pinatar Cup. She played the full 90 minutes in a 1–0 victory for Wales. She departed camp prior to the second game in order to appear for the under-19 team.

During her third cap on 8 April 2025, Middleton-Patel was awarded player of the match for her performance in a 1–1 UEFA Women's Nations League draw against Sweden. In June that year, she was named in Wales' squad for UEFA Women's Euro 2025. By playing at the tournament, she became the first female player of Asian heritage to play for Wales at a major tournament. She played in one of Wales' three matches at the tournament.

== Personal life ==
Middleton-Patel was born in Wales to an Indian father and a Welsh mother on 21 September 2004.

In September 2023, Middleton-Patel revealed via social media that she had recently been diagnosed with autism spectrum disorder.

== Career statistics ==
=== Club ===
As of match played 4 October 2026.

Appearances and goals by club, season and competition
Club	Season	League			FA Cup		League Cup		Europe		Total	
Club	Season	Division	Apps	Goals	Apps	Goals	Apps	Goals	Apps	Goals	Apps	Goals
Manchester United	2021–22	WSL	0	0	0	0	0	0	—		0	0
Manchester United	2022–23	WSL	0	0	0	0	0	0	—		0	0
Manchester United	2023–24	WSL	0	0	0	0	0	0	—		0	0
Manchester United	2024–25	WSL	0	0	0	0	1	0	—		1	0
Manchester United	2025–26	WSL	1	0	0	0	0	0	2	0	3	0
Manchester United	Total		1	0	0	0	1	0	2	0	4	0
Blackburn Rovers (loan)	2021–22	Championship	0	0	0	0	0	0	—		0	0
Leicester City (loan)	2021–22	WSL	0	0	0	0	0	0	—		0	0
Coventry United (loan)	2022–23	Championship	3	0	0	0	0	0	—		3	0
Blackburn Rovers (loan)	2022–23	Championship	1	0	0	0	0	0	—		1	0
Watford (loan)	2023–24	Championship	6	0	0	0	0	0	—		6	0
Watford (loan)	2026–27	WSL 2	5	0	0	0	1	0	—		6	0
Watford (loan)	Total		11	0	0	0	1	0	0	0	12	0
Career total			16	0	0	0	2	0	2	0	20	0

=== International ===
Statistics accurate as of match played 13 October 2026.

Wales
Year	Apps	Goals
2023	1	0
2024	1	0
2025	5	0
2026	7	0
Total	14	0

== Honours ==
Manchester United

- Women's FA Cup runner-up: 2024–25
- Women's League Cup runner-up: 2025–26
