= Sophie Barker (disambiguation) =

Sophie Barker (born 1971) is an English singer-songwriter.

Sophie Barker may also refer to:

- Sophie Barker (footballer) (born 1990), English footballer
- Sophie Barker (mayor) (born c. 1967), New Zealand local politician
