= Ashleigh Plumptre =

Nigerian footballer (born 1998)

Ashleigh Plumptre OON
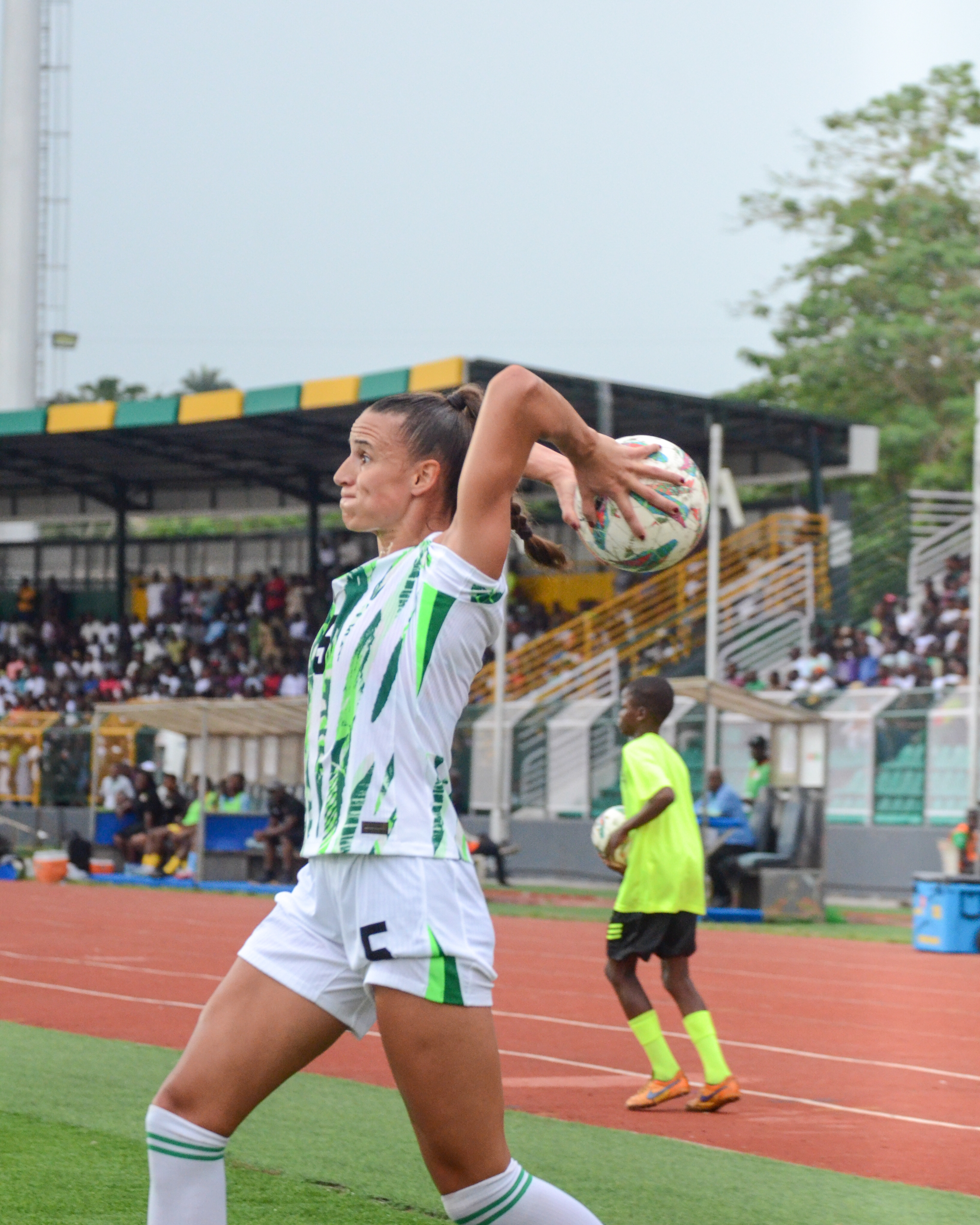
- Plumptre executing a throw-in during a match for Nigeria

Personal information
- Full name: Ashleigh Megan Plumptre
- Date of birth: 8 May 1998 (age 28)
- Place of birth: Leicester, England
- Height: 1.80 m (5 ft 11 in)
- Position: Defender

Team information
- Current team: Al-Ittihad
- Number: 22

Youth career
- 2002–2006: Asfordby Amateurs
- 2006–2013: Leicester City
- 2013–2014: Birmingham City
- 2014: Derby County

College career
Years	Team	Apps	(Gls)
2016–2019	USC Trojans	77	(5)

Senior career*
Years	Team	Apps	(Gls)
2014–2015	Notts County	4	(0)
2019	LA Galaxy OC		
2020–2023	Leicester City	62	(3)
2023–	Al-Ittihad	15	(8)

International career^{‡}
- England U15
2013–2016	England U17		
2016–2017	England U19		
2016	England U23		
2022–	Nigeria	27	(1)
- * Club domestic league appearances and goals as of 19:08, 22 November 2024 (UTC) ‡ National team caps and goals as of 20:00, 28 October 2025 (UTC)

Ashleigh Megan Plumptre OON (born 8 May 1998) is a professional footballer who plays as a defender for Saudi Premier League club Al-Ittihad. Born in England, she represents the Nigeria women's national team.

Plumptre started her senior career with Notts County before moving to the United States and college soccer for the USC Trojans. She has also previously played for LA Galaxy OC and Leicester City. Formerly an England youth international, she made her senior Nigeria debut in February 2022 and later represented the nation at the 2023 World Cup.

== Club career ==
=== Youth career ===
Born in Leicester, Plumptre grew up and attended primary school in Melton Mowbray. She began playing football at age 4 when she joined Asfordby Amateurs. At age 8, she joined the Leicester City Centre of Excellence, spending seven years with the club playing from under-10 to under-15 level. She left Leicester to join Birmingham City's under-17 team in 2013 where she also had the opportunity to train with the senior WSL 1 team. In 2014, Plumptre briefly joined third-tier FA Women's Premier League side Derby County's Centre of Excellence.

=== Notts County ===
Plumptre joined WSL 1 side Notts County in 2014. She made her senior debut on 24 August 2014, as a 57th minute substitute for Caitlin Friend in a 1–0 defeat to Liverpool. In doing so she became the youngest Notts County debutant at 16 years 108 days. She made her first start in a 1–1 WSL 1 draw with Manchester City on 3 September. Four days later she appeared as a substitute at the start of extra-time during a League Cup semi-final defeat to Arsenal.

On 1 August 2015, Plumptre was an unused substitute for the 2015 FA Women's Cup final, the first to be played at Wembley Stadium. She scored her first and only goal for Notts County on 30 August 2015 in a 5–0 League Cup group stage victory at home to second-tier Yeovil Town. Notts County also reached the League Cup final in 2015, losing to Arsenal 3–0 with Plumptre an unused substitute for the second consecutive cup final.

=== USC Trojans ===
In 2016, Plumptre moved to the United States to play college soccer at the University of Southern California. As a freshman she made 17 substitute appearances as a midfielder for the USC Trojans including in every round of the NCAA postseason. She played 27 minutes of the College Cup final as USC beat West Virginia 3–1 to claim the second national championship in program history. She scored her first collegiate goal on 22 October 2017, the game winner in a 2–1 victory over Washington State. After only two starts in another 17 appearances as a sophomore, she became a starter as a junior in 2018, starting in 19 of 20 appearances. In 2019, Plumptre transitioned to playing centre-back and started all 23 of USC's games during the season that included a postseason run to the NCAA Tournament quarter-finals. Her performances were recognised individually with All-Pacific first team and All-Pac-12 second team honours in 2019. Majoring in human biology, Plumptre's academic success earned her Pac-12 academic recognition in 2017 and 2018. She was also named to the 2018 CoSIDA Academic All-District second team and 2019 United Soccer Coaches Scholar All-America second team.

=== LA Galaxy OC ===
In March 2019, Plumptre signed to play in the UWS with LA Galaxy OC during the college offseason. The team finished second in the West Conference behind Calgary Foothills during the regular season before winning the Championship final against the same opposition.

=== Leicester City ===
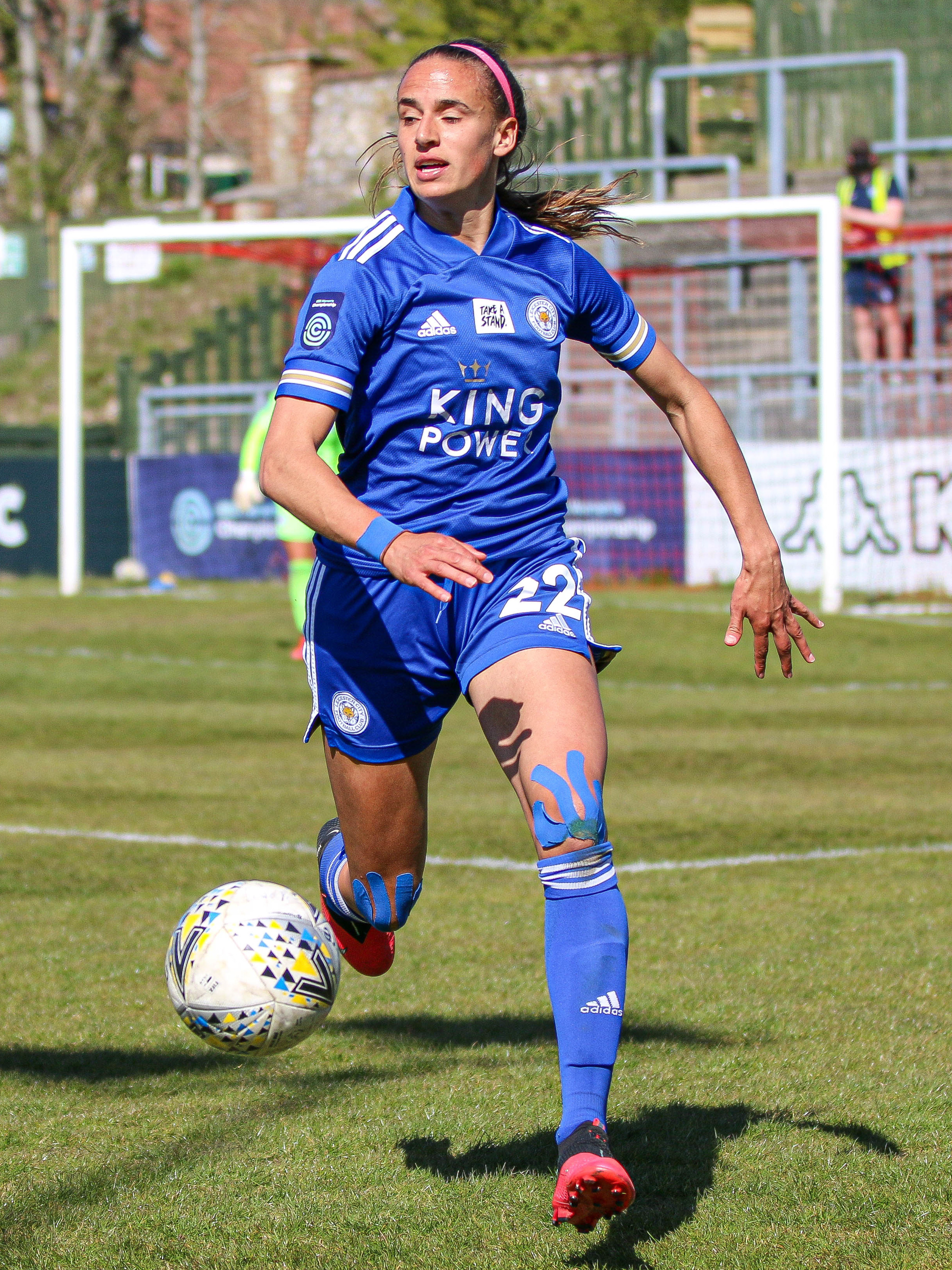
Plumptre playing for Leicester City in 2021

In December 2019, Plumptre elected to forgo the 2020 NWSL College Draft coming out of college despite projecting as a late-first round or early-second round pick and instead returned to England, rejoining hometown club Leicester City in the FA Women's Championship. The Foxes had reportedly also beaten FA WSL competition to her signature. She made her senior Leicester City debut on 19 January 2020, registering an assist on an Ella Rutherford goal in a 3–1 win over Crystal Palace. Plumptre's debut season with Leicester was limited to three league appearances as the season was curtailed as a result of the coronavirus pandemic. Leicester were awarded sixth-place on a points-per-game basis.

Ahead of the 2020–21 season, Leicester City Women were taken over by King Power having previously been an independent club with a formal affiliation to the Foxes. The club became fully professional for the first time in the process. On 4 April 2021, Leicester City clinched the league title with a 2–0 win over London City Lionesses, their twelfth consecutive league victory dating back to 4–1 defeat at the hands of the same opposition on 1 November 2020. The result earned Leicester their first ever promotion to the top-flight FA WSL. Despite a significant summer recruitment drive to attract WSL talent in the team's bid for promotion, Plumptre remained a key figure and played in all but one game during the title win as well as all four League Cup games as Leicester reached the knockout stage for the first time before defeat in the semi-finals.

Plumptre left Leicester City following the expiration of her contract in July 2023.

=== Al-Ittihad ===
On 13 September 2023, Plumptre signed for Saudi Premier League club Al-Ittihad. She later admitted that this move had made many people unhappy, due to Saudi Arabia's human rights record.

== International career ==
=== England ===
Plumptre has represented England at under-15, under-17, under-19 and under-23 level including at two tournaments: the 2014 and 2015 UEFA Women's Under-17 Championship. Predominantly a forward or attacking midfielder at youth level, she scored twice during a 9–0 win over Moldova in the 2015 UEFA Women's Under-17 Championship qualifying round. In 2016, 17-year-old Plumptre was the youngest player named to the under-23 team for the 2016 La Manga Tournament. She made a combined 30 appearances at youth level, scoring 10 goals.

=== Nigeria ===
Having earlier expressed an interest in representing Nigeria at senior level in June 2021, Plumptre received her first call-up for an eight-day training camp held in Austria the following month. She qualifies to play for Nigeria through her paternal grandfather, a Yoruba from Lagos. She made an unofficial debut on 23 July 2021, starting in a 1–0 friendly win over Slovenian 1. SŽNL club Olimpija Ljubljana. In November 2021, she attended a training camp in Nigeria. In late December 2021, she was officially cleared by FIFA to represent Nigeria. She made her official debut on 18 February 2022, starting in a 2–0 win over Ivory Coast during the 2022 Africa Women Cup of Nations qualification.

On 16 June 2023, she was included in the 23-player Nigeria squad for the 2023 FIFA Women's World Cup. She started all four games, helping Nigeria to keep three clean sheets as the team reached the round of 16 before being eliminated by England on penalties after a 0–0 draw. she was part of the Nigerian women national team squad that won the 2025 Women's Africa Cup of Nations and was appointed Officer of the Order of the Niger (OON), a hundred thousand dollars and a three-bedroom apartment in Abuja. On October 28, 2025, Plumptre scored her first goal for Nigeria in a 1-1 draw against Benin in the return leg of a 2026 Women's Africa Cup of Nations qualifier.

== Personal life ==
Plumptre's paternal grandfather was born in Nigeria. She grew up supporting Leicester City and attended the parade when the men's team won the 2015–16 Premier League title.

In 2017, Plumptre was invited to the White House as part of USC's National Championship winning celebrations.

== Career statistics ==
=== Club ===
As of 22 November 2024.

Appearances and goals by club, season and competition
Club	Season	League			National Cup		League Cup		Total	
Club	Season	Division	Apps	Goals	Apps	Goals	Apps	Goals	Apps	Goals
Notts County	2014	WSL 1	2	0	0	0	1	0	3	0
Notts County	2015	WSL 1	2	0	0	0	5	1	7	1
Notts County	Total		4	0	0	0	6	1	10	1
Leicester City	2019–20	Championship	3	0	2	0	0	0	5	0
Leicester City	2020–21	Championship	19	1	3 (Note: Includes appearance in 2019–20 Women's FA Cup fixture that wasn't played until 2020–21 season)	0	4	0	26	1
Leicester City	2021–22	WSL	20	1	2 (Note: Includes appearance in 2020–21 Women's FA Cup fixture that wasn't played until 2021–22 season)	0	3	1	25	2
Leicester City	2022–23	WSL	20	1	1	0	3	0	24	1
Leicester City	Total		62	3	8	0	10	1	80	4
Al-Ittihad Club	2023–24	Saudi Women's Premier League	12	8	2	1	0	0	14	9
Al-Ittihad Club	2024-25	Saudi Women's Premier League	3	0	1	1	0	0	4	1
	Total		15	8	3	2	10	1	18	10
Career total			81	11	11	1	16	2	108	15

=== International ===
Statistics accurate as of match played 28 October 2025.

Year	Nigeria	
Year	Apps	Goals
2022	9	0
2023	6	0
2024	3	0
2025	9	1
Total	27	1

List of international goals scored by Ashleigh Plumptre
No.	Date	Venue	Opponent	Score	Result	Competition
1.	28 October 2025	MKO Abiola Stadium, Abeokuta, Nigeria	Benin	1–0	1–1	2026 Women's Africa Cup of Nations qualification

== Honours ==
Notts County

- Women's FA Cup runner-up: 2015
- FA Women's League Cup runner-up: 2015

USC Trojans

- NCAA Division I Women's Soccer Championship: 2016

LA Galaxy OC

- UWS Championship: 2019

Leicester City

- FA Women's Championship: 2020–21

Nigeria

- Women's Africa Cup of Nations: 2024

Orders

- Officer of the Order of the Niger
