= Hannah Cain =

Wales international footballer

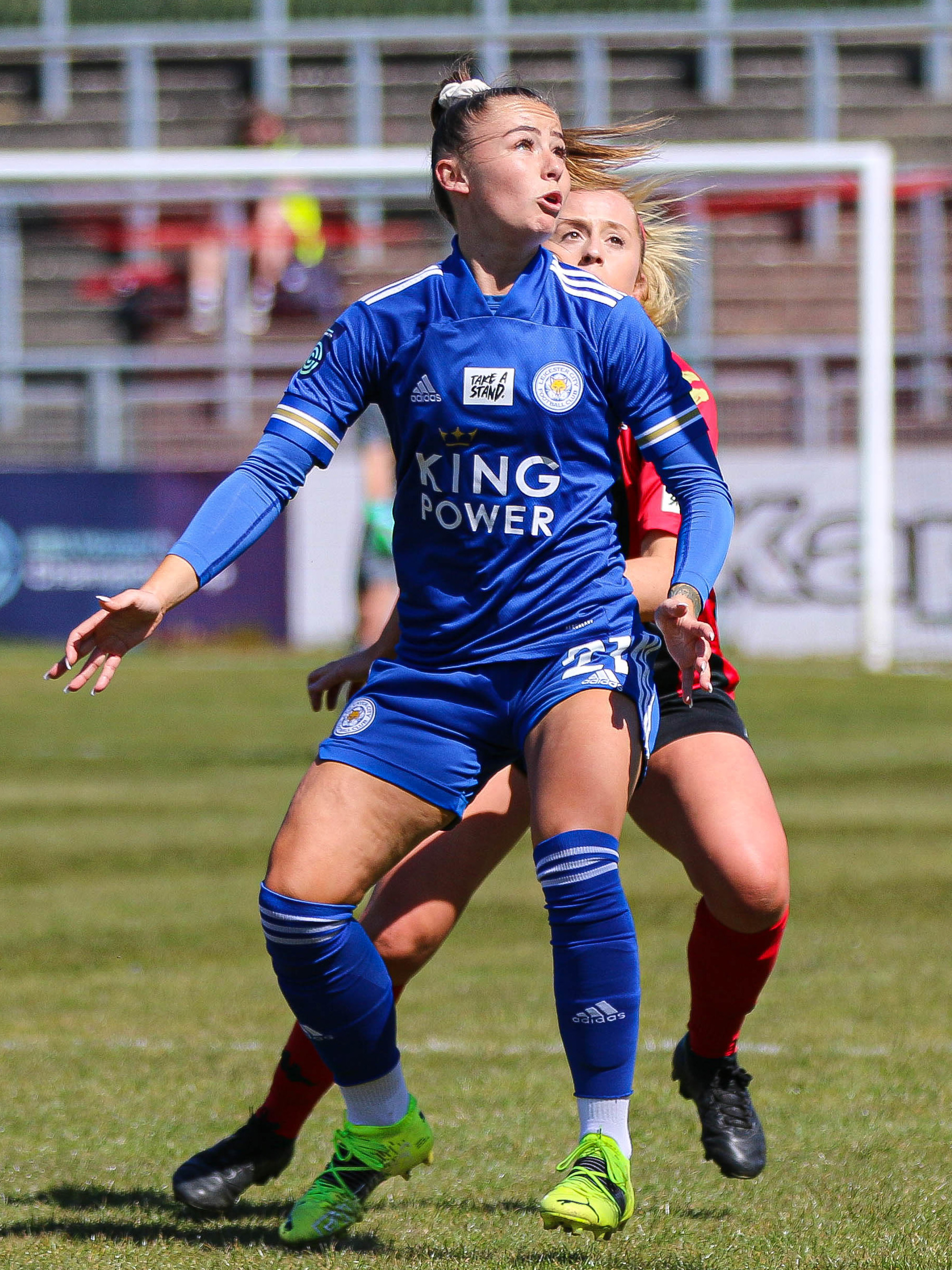
- Cain playing for Leicester City in 2021

Personal information
- Full name: Hannah Jade Cain
- Date of birth: 11 February 1999 (age 27)
- Place of birth: Doncaster, England
- Height: 1.64 m (5 ft 5 in)
- Position: Forward

Team information
- Current team: Everton

Youth career
- Sheffield United

Senior career*
Years	Team	Apps	(Gls)
2016–2018	Sheffield FC	30	(8)
2018–2020	Everton	26	(2)
2020–2026	Leicester City	51	(8)
2026–	Everton	2	(0)

International career^{‡}
2014	Wales U16		
2014	Wales U17		
2014–2017	England U17	12	(6)
2017–2018	England U19	3	(2)
2019	England U21	3	(1)
2021–	Wales	33	(12)
- * Club domestic league appearances and goals as of 06:38, 15 September 2026 (UTC) ‡ National team caps and goals as of 13 October 2026

Hannah Jade Cain (born 11 February 1999) is a professional footballer who plays as a forward for Women's Super League club Everton and the Wales national football team.

She has represented both England on the under-17, under-19 and under-21 national teams, and represented Wales at under-16, under-17 level and senior level. She is eligible to play for Wales through her maternal grandfather.

== Club career ==
=== Sheffield FC ===
Cain began her development at the Sheffield United Centre of Excellence. In 2016, Cain joined Sheffield FC in the WSL 2. In October 2016, Cain won the Future Star award at the Sheffield Olympic Legacy Celebration of Sport awards. Cain left Sheffield after they were relegated to the National League for failing to meet the new Championship licensing criteria. In her final season with the club she was named Supporters' Player of the Year.

=== Everton ===
In July 2018, Cain signed with Everton on her first full-time professional contract. She made her debut for the Blues against Manchester City as a substitute. Cain scored her first goal for the Blues against Reading in November 2018. On 27 May 2020, Cain left Everton after her contract expired.

=== Leicester City ===
On 4 November 2021, Cain suffered an ACL injury. On 17 February 2023, she was nominated for the Goal of the Month award for her goal against Liverpool. On 14 July 2023, Cain signed a long-term contract with Leicester City. Following Leicester's relegation at the end of the 2025–26 Women's Super League season, it was announced that Cain would depart the club upon the expiry of her contract in the summer of 2026.

=== Return to Everton ===
On 16 July 2026, Cain was announced at Everton after her contract with Leicester expired.

== International career ==
In April 2014, Cain was named in Wales squad for an under-16 UEFA development tournament in Northern Ireland. Later that year she played for Wales in an under-17 friendly against Northern Ireland. Cain has since represented England on the under-17 and under-19 national teams. In 2017, Cain was called into the under-19 squad, but would not make an appearance until 2018 to compete in the UEFA Women's U-19 Championship qualifiers scoring twice in three starts.

Cain decided to switch her allegiance back to Wales in September 2021. She was called up to the Wales squad for 2023 World Cup qualifying matches in September 2021.

=== Wales national team ===
Cain made her Wales national team debut against Estonia on 26 October 2021.

Cain was part of the Wales squad that finished as runners-up in the 2023 Pinatar Cup.

In June 2025, Cain was named in Wales' squad for UEFA Women's Euro 2025. During the UEFA Women’s Euro 2025 qualifying campaign, Cain scored a crucial penalty against the Republic of Ireland in Dublin, helping Cymru secure their place in the final tournament in Switzerland.

On 2 December 2025, Cain scored a goal in a 3–2 friendly win over Switzerland, ending Wales' 12-game losing streak.

Cain scored in a 2–2 draw with the Czech Republic in Wales' opening game of the 2027 FIFA Women's World Cup qualification campaign on 3 March 2026.

== Career statistics ==
=== Club ===
As of match played 13 September 2026.

Appearances and goals by club, season and competition
Club	Season	League			FA Cup (Note: Includes the Women's FA Cup)		League Cup (Note: Includes the WSL Cup/Women's League Cup)		Total	
Club	Season	Division	Apps	Goals	Apps	Goals	Apps	Goals	Apps	Goals
Sheffield FC	2016	Women's Super League 2	8	2	1	0	1	0	10	2
Sheffield FC	2017	Women's Super League 2	9	1	0	0	0	0	9	1
Sheffield FC	2017–18	Women's Super League 2	13	5	0	0	3	0	16	5
Sheffield FC	Total		30	8	1	0	4	0	35	8
Everton	2018–19	Women's Super League	13	2	0	0	0	0	13	2
Everton	2019–20	Women's Super League	13	0	1	1	4	0	18	1
Everton	Total		26	2	1	1	4	0	31	3
Leicester City	2020–21	Women's Championship	9	3	3	2	2	0	14	5
Leicester City	2021–22	Women's Super League	4	0	0	0	0	0	4	0
Leicester City	2022–23	Women's Super League	14	2	1	1	2	0	17	3
Leicester City	2023–24	Women's Super League	8	0	0	0	2	1	10	1
Leicester City	2024–25	Women's Super League	16	3	2	0	2	1	20	4
Leicester City	2025–26	Women's Super League	22	0	1	0	2	0	25	0
Leicester City	Total		73	8	7	3	10	2	90	13
Everton	2026–27	Women's Super League	2	0	0	0	0	0	2	0
Career total			131	11	19	4	18	2	158	24

=== International ===
As of matches played 13 October 2026. Statistics from the Football Association of Wales

Appearances and goals by national team and year
National team	Year	Apps	Goals
Wales	2021	1	0
Wales	2022	3	0
Wales	2023	4	1
Wales	2024	2	1
Wales	2025	15	3
Wales	2026	8	7
Total		33	12

Scores and results list Wales's goal tally first, score column indicates score after each Cain goal.

List of international goals scored by Hannah Cain
No.	Date	Venue	Opponent	Score	Result	Competition
1.	6 April 2023	Cardiff City Stadium, Cardiff, Wales	Northern Ireland	3–0	4–1	Friendly
2.	3 December 2024	Aviva Stadium, Dublin, Ireland	Republic of Ireland	1–0	2–1	UEFA Women's Euro 2025 qualifying play-offs
3.	8 April 2025	Gamla Ullevi, Gothenburg, Sweden	Sweden	1–1	1–1	2025 UEFA Women's Nations League
4.	13 July 2025	Kybunpark, St. Gallen, Switzerland	England	1–5	1–6	UEFA Women's Euro 2025
5.	2 December 2025	Estadio Municipal de Chapín, Jerez de la Frontera, Spain	Switzerland	2–1	3–2	Friendly
6.	3 March 2026	Městský fotbalový stadion Miroslava Valenty, Uherské Hradiště, Czech Republic	Czech Republic	1–1	2–2	2027 FIFA Women's World Cup qualification
7.	7 March 2026	Parc y Scarlets, Llanelli, Wales	Montenegro	1–0	6–1	2027 FIFA Women's World Cup qualification
8.	7 March 2026	Parc y Scarlets, Llanelli, Wales	Montenegro	5–0	6–1	2027 FIFA Women's World Cup qualification
9.	14 April 2026	STōK Cae Ras, Wrexham, Wales	Albania	1–0	4–0	2027 FIFA Women's World Cup qualification
10.	14 April 2026	STōK Cae Ras, Wrexham, Wales	Albania	4–0	4–0	2027 FIFA Women's World Cup qualification
11.	5 June 2026	Podgorica City Stadium, Podgorica, Montenegro	Montenegro	1–0	1–1	2027 FIFA Women's World Cup qualification
12.	13 October 2026	Parc y Scarlets, Llanelli, Wales	Albania	3–0	3–0	2027 FIFA Women's World Cup qualification play-offs
