= Holly Morgan =

English footballer

Personal information
- Full name: Holly Morgan
- Date of birth: 10 February 1993 (age 33)
- Place of birth: Leicester, Leicestershire, England
- Position: Defender

Youth career
- 2006–2011: Leicester City

Senior career*
Years	Team	Apps	(Gls)
2011–2021	Leicester City	60	(1)
- * Club domestic league appearances and goals

Holly Morgan (born 10 February 1993) is a former professional association footballer who played as a defender. Her one and only team were FA Women's Super League's Leicester City. She joined Leicester in 2004 at the age of 11 and she has been a one club woman apart from playing with River City Ladies 2022/23 Season.

Her brother Jonathan is the former manager of Leicester Reserves and the first team. Her father Rohan, is the chairman, and her sister, Jade, is the general manager. She is a qualified solicitor and has completed the London Marathon.

On 20 July 2021, Morgan retired after 17 years playing for Leicester City to take up a coaching role with the club. She left Leicester on 25 November, after her brother was sacked as team manager.

== Honours ==
=== League ===
- FA Women's Championship (1) 2020–21
- FA Women's Midlands Division One (1): 2015–16

=== Cups ===
- Midlands Combination League Cup
- Leicestershire & Rutland County FA Cup (4): 2017–18, 2013–14, 2011–12, 2010–11
