= Sophie Barker (footballer) =

English footballer

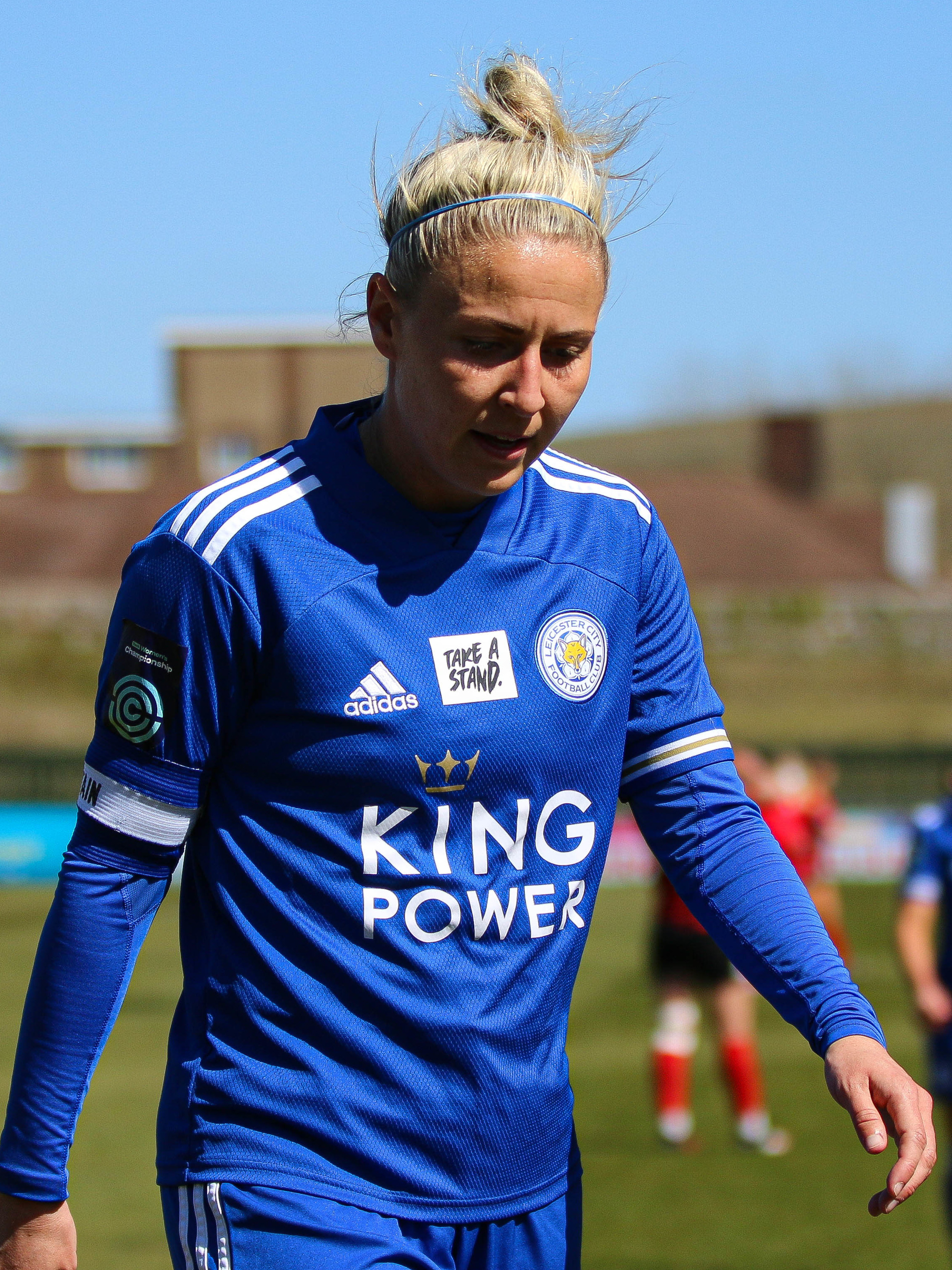
- Sophie Barker with Leicester City in April 2021

Personal information
- Full name: Sophie Louise Floella Barker
- Date of birth: 25 December 1990 (age 35)
- Place of birth: Lincoln, England
- Height: 1.57 m (5 ft 2 in)
- Positions: Defender; midfielder

Team information
- Current team: Portsmouth
- Number: 4

Youth career
- Lincoln City

Senior career*
Years	Team	Apps	(Gls)
2011–2012	Notts County Ladies F.C.	23	(0)
2010–2012	→ Rotherham United (loan)		
2014	→ Nettleham (loan)		
2014	Sheffield FC		
2015–2018	Doncaster Rovers Belles	33	(0)
2018–2020	Sheffield United	20	(1)
2020–2023	Leicester City	32	(1)
2022–2023	→ Sheffield United (loan)	13	(0)
2023–2024	Sheffield United	22	(0)
2024–	Portsmouth		
- * Club domestic league appearances and goals as of 15:24, 3 May 2022 (UTC)

Sophie Louise Floella Barker (born 25 December 1990) is an English footballer who plays as a defender or midfielder for Portsmouth. She previously played for Lincoln Ladies, Sheffield and Doncaster Rovers Belles.

== Club career ==
Barker scored "a fine strike" in Lincoln's 5–1 FA Women's Cup semi-final defeat by Arsenal before a record 3,000 crowd at Sincil Bank in March 2008. In the 2016 FA WSL season midfielder Barker was re-purposed as a full-back. Despite Doncaster's relegation, she adapted to the new role successfully, being awarded a new contract and named Manager's Player of the Season.

On 22 August, ahead of the 2020–21 FA Women's Championship season, Leicester City announced the signing of Barker, among a host of others, as the club embarked on their journey as a fully professional club.
