= Charlie Devlin =

English professional footballer, forward

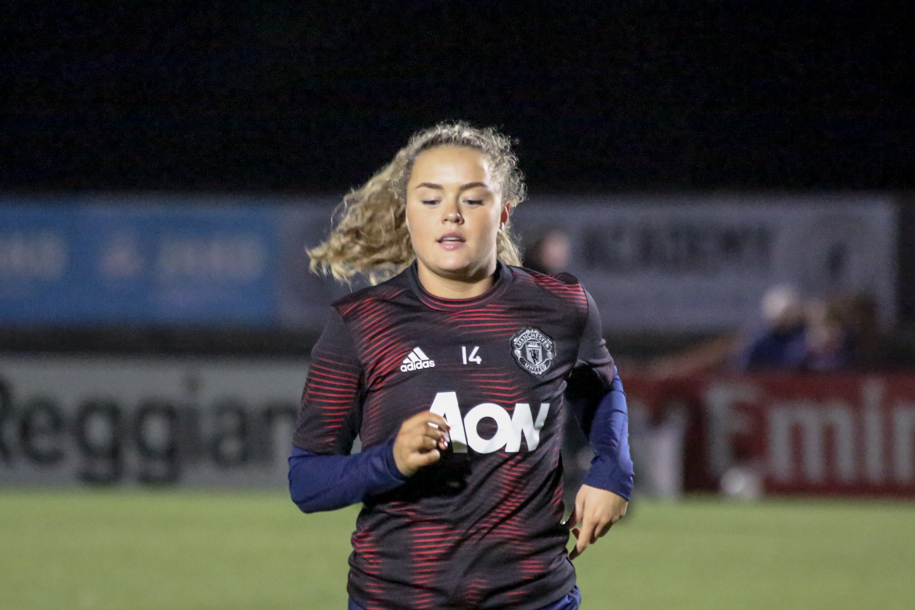
- Devlin with Manchester United in 2019

Personal information
- Full name: Charlotte Devlin
- Date of birth: 23 February 1998 (age 28)
- Place of birth: London, England
- Positions: Midfielder; forward

Team information
- Current team: Sheffield United.

Youth career
- ?–2012: Millwall CoE
- 2012–2016: Arsenal

Senior career*
Years	Team	Apps	(Gls)
2016–2017	Arsenal	0	(0)
2017	→ Millwall Lionesses (loan)	5	(3)
2017–2018	Millwall Lionesses	18	(9)
2018–2019	Manchester United	16	(5)
2019–2020	Charlton Athletic	9	(2)
2020–2023	Leicester City	28	(3)
2022–2023	→ Birmingham City (loan)	21	(3)
2023–2025	Birmingham City	18	(4)
2024–2025	→ Rangers (loan)	10	(3)
2025–	Sheffield United	13	(3)

International career^{‡}
2015	England U17	5	(1)
- England U19
- * Club domestic league appearances and goals as of 1 February 2026 ‡ National team caps and goals as of 20 December 2020

Charlotte Devlin (born 23 February 1998) is an English footballer who plays as a midfielder for Sheffield United in the Women's Super League 2.

== Club career ==
=== Arsenal ===
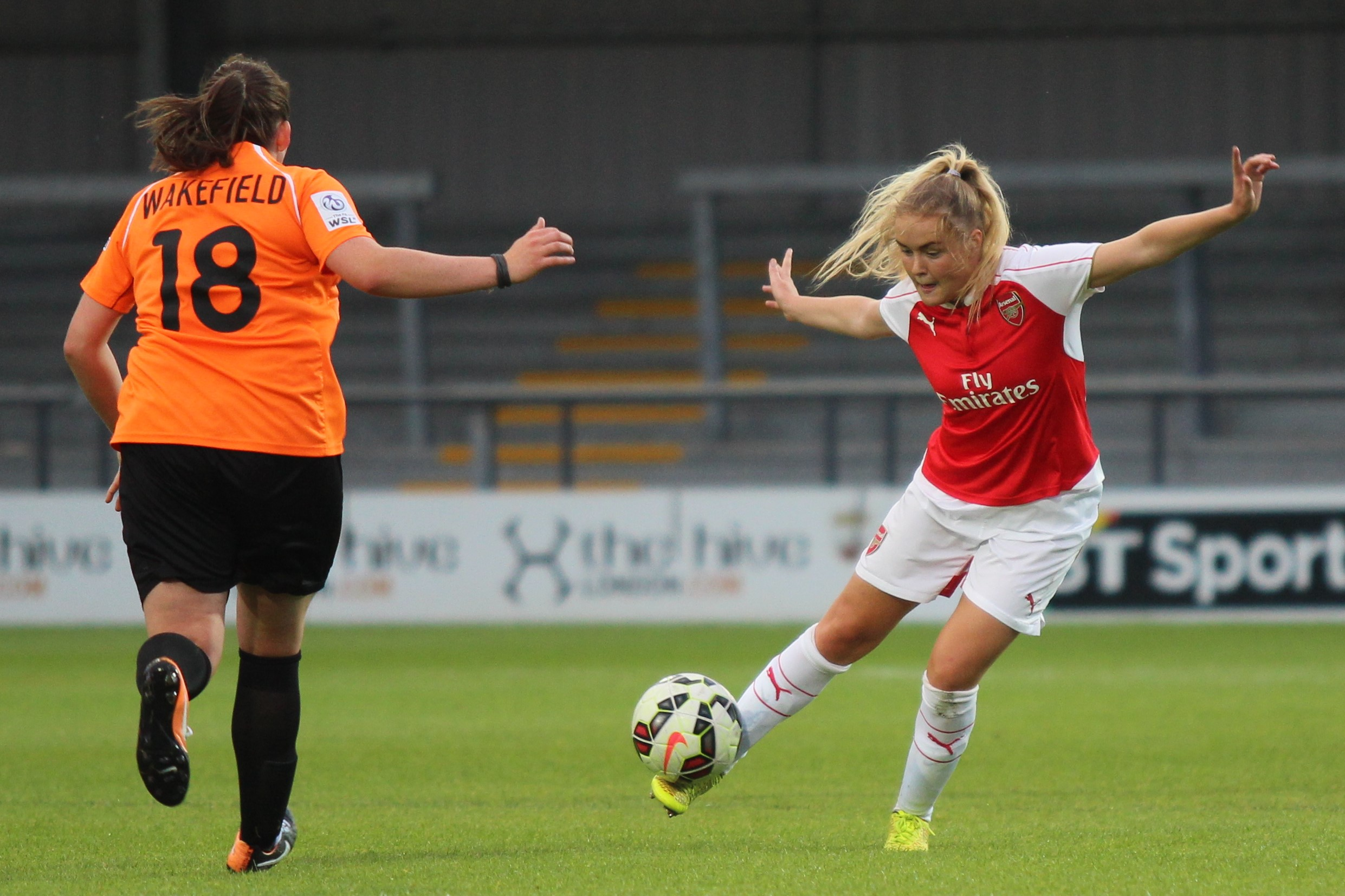
Devlin (right) playing for Arsenal against London Bees.

Devlin signed her first professional contract with Arsenal in June 2016. She had been at the club since she was 14 having joined from the Millwall Centre of Excellence, and helped Arsenal's development squad to a league and cup double in 2015/16.

=== Millwall Lionesses ===
Devlin initially returned to Millwall Lionesses on loan for the 2017 Spring Series, scoring the winner in a 2–1 victory against London Bees in her first game with the club. The move was made permanent prior to the start of the 2017–18 season. In the one full season she had at Millwall, Devlin led the team in goals with 9, making her the fifth highest scorer in the WSL 2.

=== Manchester United ===
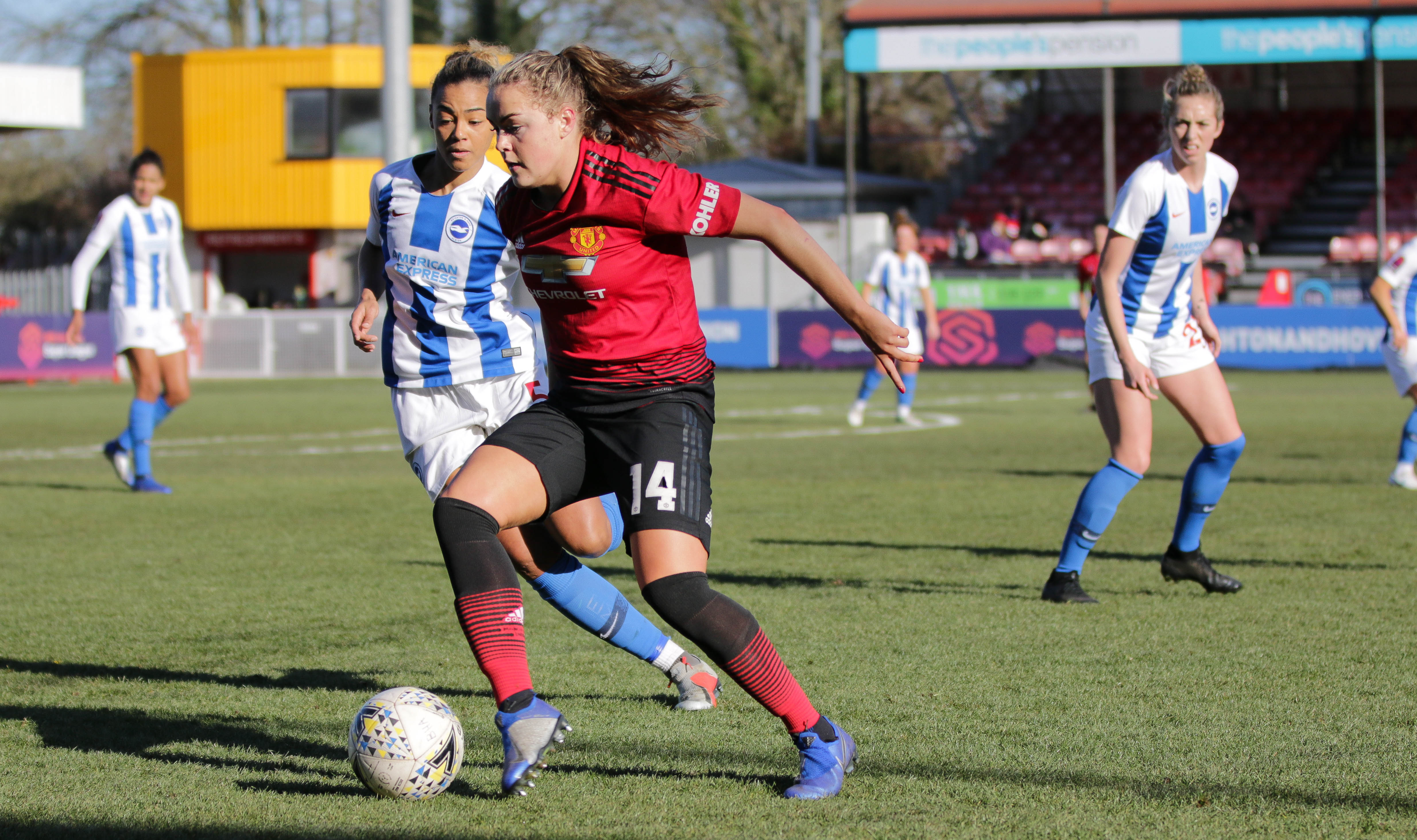
Devlin playing for Manchester United against Brighton & Hove Albion.

In July 2018, Devlin joined Manchester United for their inaugural season in the FA Women's Championship. She made her competitive debut for Manchester United, as an 89th minute substitute for Lauren James, in a 1–0 League Cup victory against Liverpool on 19 August, and her Championship debut in a 12–0 win against Aston Villa on 9 September. She scored her first goal for United on 4 November in a 4–1 win over Tottenham. She was released by the club at the end of the season having made 21 appearances.

=== Charlton Athletic ===
On 9 August 2019, Devlin signed with FA Women's Championship team Charlton Athletic for the 2019–20 season. Devlin made her debut in their opening game on 25 August 2019, playing the full 90 minutes in a 0–0 home draw with Lewes. On 15 September, Devlin was sent off after receiving two yellow cards in Charlton's 2–0 league loss to London City Lionesses.

=== Leicester City ===
Devlin signed an 18-month contract with fellow Championship side Leicester City on 8 January 2020. Devlin made her debut in a 1–0 league loss against Durham on 12 January 2020. The team won the 2020–21 FA Women's Championship title, earning promotion to the FA WSL for the first time in their history. On 4 June 2021, Devlin signed a new two-year contract.

=== Birmingham City ===
On 29 July 2022, Devlin moved on a season-long loan to Birmingham City in the FA Women's Championship. After her loan ended at the end of the season, Devlin was released by Leicester City and re-joined Birmingham City on a two-year permanent basis.

=== Rangers ===
On 12 September 2024, Devlin moved on a season-long loan to Rangers.

=== Sheffield United ===
On 10 July 2025, it was announced that Devlin had signed a one-year contract with Sheffield United.

== International career ==
Devlin represented England at the 2015 UEFA Women's Under-17 Championship in Iceland, scoring in a 3–1 win over the host nation.

She has also played for the country at under-19 level and was part of the team that lifted the Women's International Cup in 2016 having won all three tournament games against France, Northern Ireland and USA.

In January 2019, Devlin was a late addition to Mo Marley's Under-21 training camp at St. George's Park.

== Career statistics ==
=== Club ===
As of match played 1 February 2026.

Appearances and goals by club, season and competition
Club	Season	League			FA Cup (Note: Includes the FA Cup)		League Cup (Note: Includes the League Cup and SWPL Cup)		Total	
Club	Season	Division	Apps	Goals	Apps	Goals	Apps	Goals	Apps	Goals
Arsenal	2016	WSL 1	0	0	0	0	2	0	2	0
Millwall Lionesses	2017	WSL 2	5	3	—		—		5	3
Millwall Lionesses	2017–18	WSL 2	18	9	0	0	3	0	21	9
Millwall Lionesses	Total		23	12	0	0	3	0	26	12
Manchester United	2018–19	Championship	16	5	2	1	3	0	21	6
Charlton Athletic	2019–20	Championship	9	2	0	0	4	2	13	4
Leicester City	2019–20	Championship	4	1	2	0	0	0	6	1
Leicester City	2020–21	Championship	18	2	3 (Note: Includes appearance in 2019–20 Women's FA Cup fixture that wasn't played until 2020–21 season)	1	4	1	25	4
Leicester City	2021–22	WSL	6	0	0	0	2	0	8	0
Leicester City	Total		28	3	5	1	6	1	39	5
Birmingham City F.C. (loan)	2022–23	Championship	21	3	2	0	2	0	25	3
Birmingham City F.C.	2023–24	Championship	17	4	2	0	2	0	21	4
Birmingham City F.C.	2024–25	Championship	1	0	0	0	0	0	1	0
Birmingham City F.C.	Total		39	7	4	0	4	0	47	7
Rangers	2024-25	SWPL	10	3	0	0	2	1	12	4
Sheffield United	2025–26	WSL 2	13	3	2	3	2	0	17	6
Career total			138	35	13	5	26	4	176	44

== Honours ==
=== Club ===
Manchester United

- FA Women's Championship: 2018–19

Leicester City

- FA Women's Championship: 2020–21
