= Millie Farrow =

English footballer (born 1996)

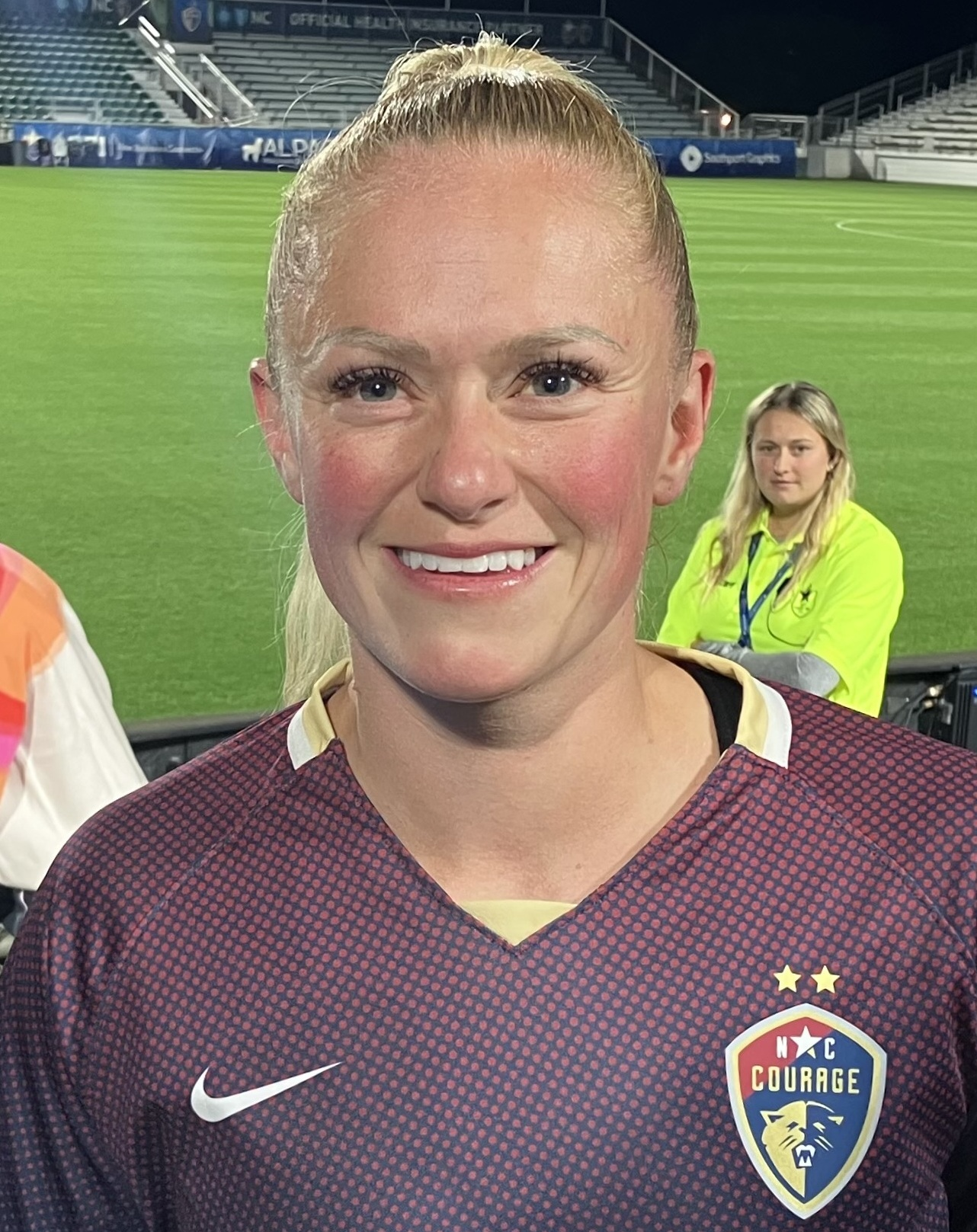
- Farrow in 2023

Personal information
- Full name: Millie Laura Farrow
- Date of birth: 3 June 1996 (age 30)
- Place of birth: Portsmouth, England
- Position: Forward

Team information
- Current team: Trabzonspor

Youth career
- Hampshire Centre of Excellence

Senior career*
Years	Team	Apps	(Gls)
2014–2018	Chelsea	3	(1)
2016–2017	→ Bristol City (loan)	16	(11)
2018	Bristol City	9	(1)
2018–2020	Reading	14	(3)
2020–2021	Leicester City	17	(4)
2021–2022	Crystal Palace	19	(5)
2022	London City Lionesses	0	(0)
2022–2023	North Carolina Courage	3	(0)
2023–2024	Perth Glory	22	(7)
2024–2025	Sydney FC	13	(1)
2025–2026	Central Coast Mariners	14	(0)
2026–	Trabzonspor	0	(0)

International career^{‡}
2014–2015	England U19		
2016	England U23		
- * Club domestic league appearances and goals as of 24 July 2026 ‡ National team caps and goals as of 24 November 2016

Millie Laura Farrow (born 3 June 1996) is an English professional footballer who plays as a forward for Turkish Women's Football Super League (KFSL) club Trabzonspor. She has represented England on the under-19 and under-23 national teams.

== Career ==
Farrow attended Itchen College in Southampton where she was part of the team who won the ECFA National Knockout Cup, scoring four goals in the final against Wyke College at the Bescot Stadium.

=== Chelsea ===
Farrow made her debut for Chelsea during the 2014 FA WSL season. Chelsea finished in second place with a 8–4–2 record.

Farrow returned for the 2015 FA WSL season and scored her first goal against Bristol City on 12 July 2015. She made two appearances for Chelsea during the regular season. The team finished in first place.

=== Bristol City ===
Farrow went on loan to Bristol City in January 2016 ahead of the 2016 FA WSL season. She scored 11 goals in her 16 appearances for the team and helped secure a second-place result with a 10–3–3 record and promotion to FA WSL 1. Farrow scored a brace during the final game of the season against Oxford United helping Bristol City win 5–0.

Farrow signed permanently for Bristol City in January 2018, after her previous loan spell had been cut short by injury.

=== Reading ===
On 22 July 2018, Farrow joined Reading. On 8 June 2020, Reading announced that Farrow had left the club after her contract had expired.

=== Leicester City ===
On 22 August 2020, FA Women's Championship club, Leicester City announced the signing of Millie Farrow ahead of the 2020–21 season, among seven other FA WSL players, as they embarked on their journey as a fully professional club.

=== Crystal Palace ===
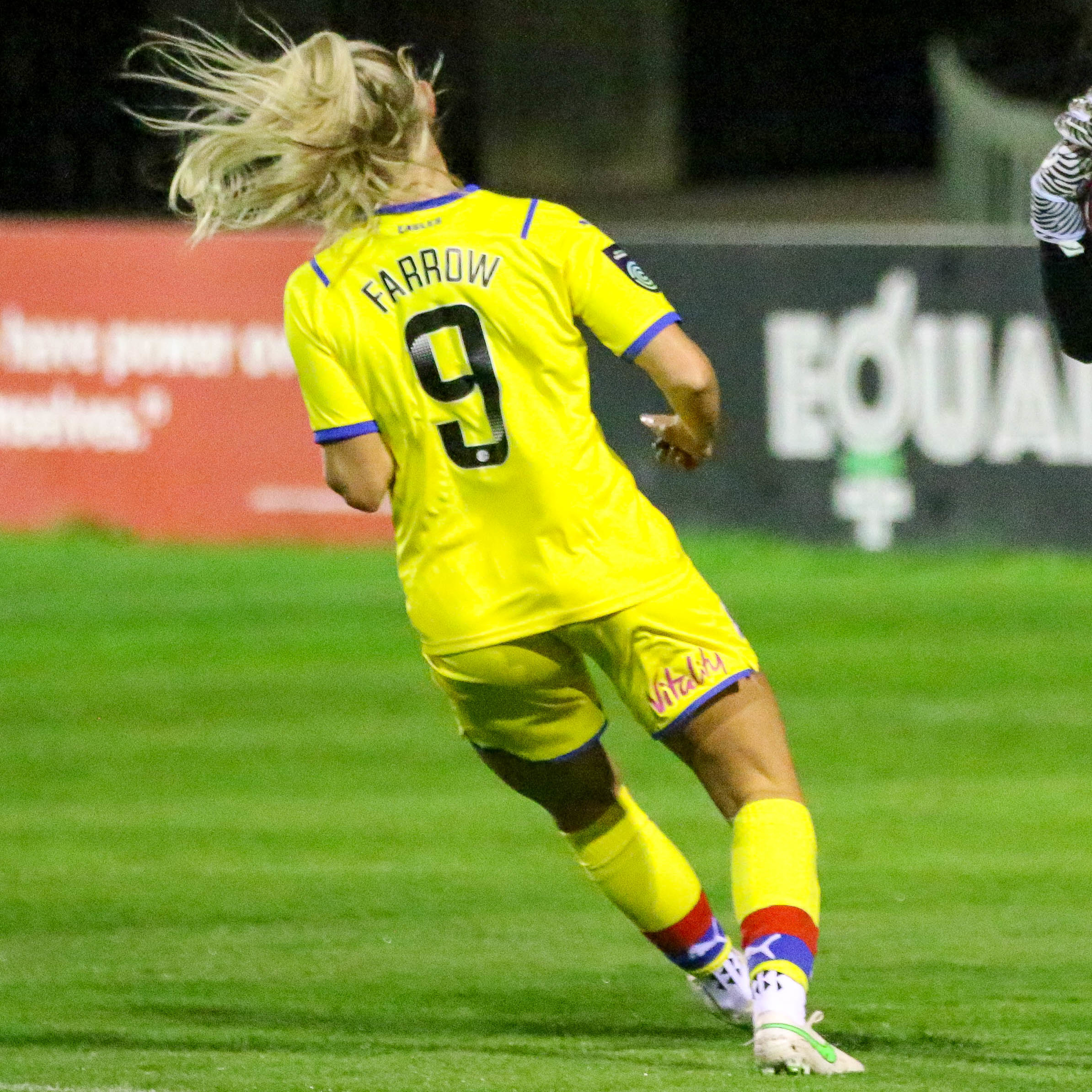
Farrow in 2021

On 20 July 2021, FA Women's Championship club Crystal Palace announced the signing of Farrow ahead of the 2021–22 season. She scored her first goal in a 1–1 draw with newly promoted Sunderland.

The following season she signed for London City Lionesses but left after her contract was voided without making a competitive appearance. She then joined National Women's Soccer League side North Carolina Courage on a deal until the end of the 2023 season.

=== Perth Glory ===
On 17 July 2023, Perth Glory announced the signing of Farrow ahead of the 2023–24 A-League Women season.

On 9 December 2023, Farrow became the first player to score a hat-trick for Perth Glory since Sam Kerr in 2019, scoring all three of their goals against Melbourne City in a 1–3 win in Melbourne.

=== Sydney FC ===
In June 2024, it was announced Farrow would join Sydney FC for the 2024–25 A-League Women season. In June 2025, she was released by the club.

=== Central Coast Mariners ===
In October 2025, Farrow joined A-League Women defending champions Central Coast Mariners.

=== Trabzonspor ===
Ahead of the 2026–27 season, Farrow signed for Kadın Futbol Süper Ligi (KFSL) club Trabzonspor.

== International career ==
Farrow has represented England on the under-19 and under-23 national teams.

== Personal life ==
Farrow has struggled with obsessive–compulsive disorder (OCD) throughout her career. In 2023, she released a book called Brave Enough Not To Quit, which details how she deals with her OCD and anxiety.

== Honours ==
with Chelsea

- FA WSL 1 Runner-up: 2014
- FA WSL 1 Winner: 2015
- FA Women's Cup Winner: 2014–15
- FA Women's Cup Runner-up: 2015–16

with Bristol City

- FA WSL 2 Runner-up: 2015

with Leicester City

- FA Women’s Championship: 2020–21
