= Paige Bailey-Gayle =

Jamaican footballer (born 2001)

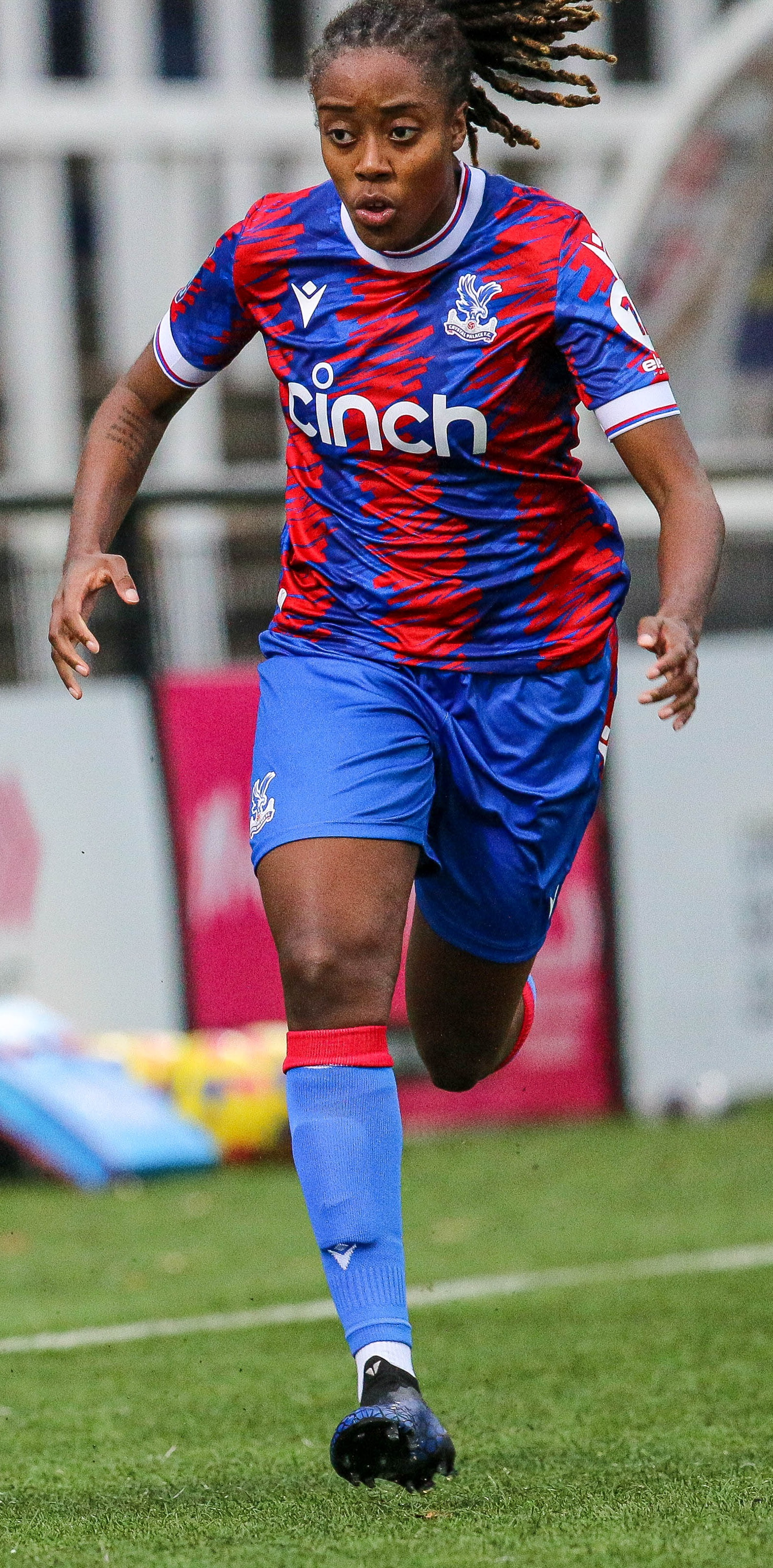
- Bailey-Gayle on 27 November 2022, playing for Crystal Palace Football Club Women

Personal information
- Full name: Paige Alicia Bailey-Gayle
- Date of birth: 12 November 2001 (age 25)
- Place of birth: London, England
- Position: Forward

Team information
- Current team: Grasshopper Club Zurich

Youth career
- Stoke Newington
- Arsenal

Senior career*
Years	Team	Apps	(Gls)
2018–2019	Arsenal	3	(0)
2019–2022	Leicester City	41	(9)
2022–2024	Crystal Palace	17	(0)
2024	Newcastle United	10	(7)
2024–2025	SC Sand	0	(0)

International career^{‡}
2017	England U17	8	(0)
2019	England U18		
2021–	Jamaica	10	(0)
Medal record
Representing Jamaica
CONCACAF W Championship
Third place	2022 Mexico
- * Club domestic league appearances and goals as of 2 June 2024 (UTC) ‡ National team caps and goals as of 2 March 2026

Paige Alicia Bailey-Gayle (born 12 November 2001) is a professional footballer who plays as a forward for Grasshopper Club Zurich. Born in England, she represents Jamaica internationally.

== Club career ==
Bailey-Gayle started her senior career with Arsenal. She was promoted into the club's first-team squad in November 2018 under manager Joe Montemurro, with the forward making her professional debut on 18 November during a 0–4 win away to Everton at Haig Avenue. After a total of four appearances for Arsenal, Bailey-Gayle departed at the conclusion of 2018–19 – subsequently joining Championship side Leicester City on 24 June 2019. She scored her first senior goal on 29 September in a home defeat to Crystal Palace. On 20 February 2020, Bailey-Gayle scored both goals in a 2–1 victory against Reading in the FA Cup fifth round.

== International career ==
Bailey-Gayle represented England at U17 level. She was called up for the 2018 UEFA Women's Under-17 Championship in Lithuania, having previously won four caps in qualifying; in the tournament proper, Bailey-Gayle featured four further times as England finished fourth. In July 2018, Bailey-Gayle was selected by the U18s for a three-team tournament at St George's Park.

Bailey-Gayle is eligible to represent Jamaica through her grandparents, all of whom were born in the country. In 2021, she made her senior international debut against Costa Rica.

== Personal life ==
Bailey-Gayle attended Stoke Newington School, featuring for their football team. She also played cricket as a youngster, notably being selected by Victoria Park & Tower Hamlets for the 2015 London Youth Games.

== Career statistics ==
As of 3 March 2024.

Club statistics
Club	Season	League			Cup		League Cup		Total	
Club	Season	Division	Apps	Goals	Apps	Goals	Apps	Goals	Apps	Goals
Arsenal	2018–19	FA WSL	3	0	0	0	1	0	4	0
Arsenal	Total		3	0	0	0	1	0	4	0
Leicester City	2019–20	Championship	14	4	2	2	3	0	19	6
Leicester City	2020–21	Championship	15	5	0	0	3	1	18	6
Leicester City	2021–22	FA WSL	12	0	0	0	2	0	14	0
Leicester City	Total		41	9	2	2	8	1	51	12
Crystal Palace F.C.	2022–23	Championship	17	0	1	0	3	0	21	0
Crystal Palace F.C.	2023–24	Championship	7	0	0	0	3	0	10	0
Crystal Palace F.C.	Total		24	0	1	0	6	0	31	0
Newcastle United F.C.	2023–24	FA WNL	3	4	0	0	1	0	4	4
	Total		3	4	0	0	1	0	4	4
Career total			71	13	3	2	16	1	90	16

== Honours ==
Arsenal

- FA Women's Super League: 2018–19
- FA Women's League Cup runner-up: 2019

Leicester City

- Women's Championship: 2020–21

Individual

- Women's Championship Player of the month: February 2020
