= Lachante Paul =

Jamaican association football player

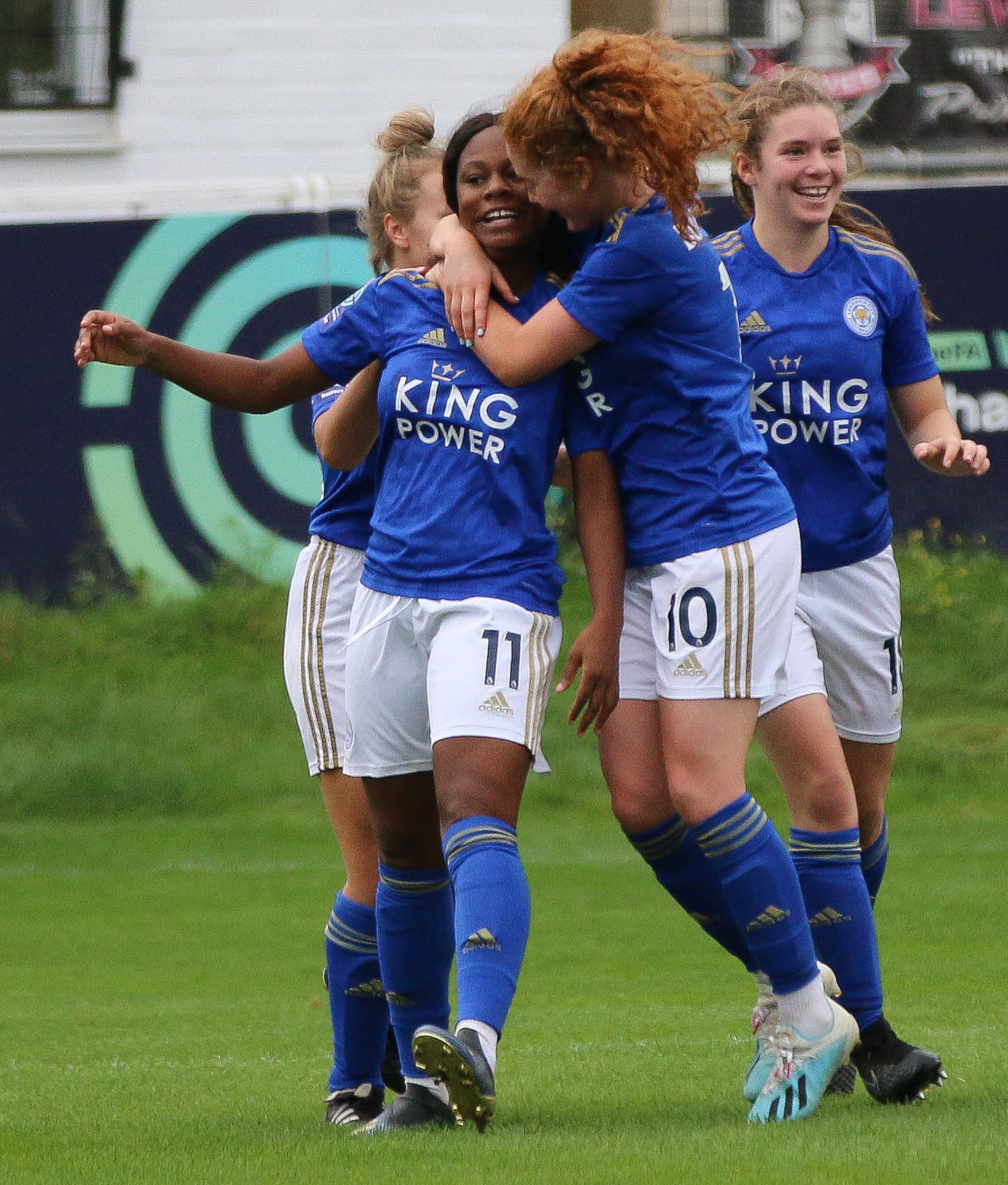
- Lachante Paul (11) congratulated after scoring for Leicester City in 2019

Personal information
- Full name: Lachante Paul
- Date of birth: 6 August 2002 (age 24)
- Place of birth: London, England
- Height: 1.67 m (5 ft 6 in)
- Position: Forward

Team information
- Current team: Watford
- Number: 7

Youth career
- Arsenal

Senior career*
Years	Team	Apps	(Gls)
2018–2019	Arsenal	0	(0)
2019–2023	Leicester City	35	(11)
2023–2024	Burnley		
2024-	Watford	44	(12)

International career^{‡}
2024–	Jamaica	2	(0)
- * Club domestic league appearances and goals as of 21:06, 24 November 2023 (UTC) ‡ National team caps and goals as of 27 February 2024

Lachante Paul (born 6 August 2002) is a footballer who plays as a forward for Watford in the FA Women's National League North. Born in England, she made her senior international debut for Jamaica in February 2024.

== Early life ==
Paul was born in London and began playing football in the garden with her father, brother and cousins, all football fans. She started playing more seriously for the Arsenal W.F.C. Academy. In 2018–19, she scored 15 goals in 15 games for Arsenal's WSL Academy team, including twice in the FA WSL Academy Cup final win over Manchester United.

== Club career ==
Paul made her senior debut and only appearance for Arsenal on 12 December 2018, as a 73rd-minute substitute in a 2018–19 FA Women's League Cup group stage victory over Millwall Lionesses.

In June 2019, aged 16, Paul left her home and family in London and signed with Leicester City, hoping to gain more playing time than she would by remaining at Arsenal. She scored six times in 19 appearances during the 2019–20 season, which was curtailed by the COVID-19 pandemic, then struck seven goals in 25 games in 2020–21 as the club secured promotion to the FA WSL. She was among nine Leicester players to be awarded a new contract with the club ahead of their maiden top flight campaign in 2021–22. Early in Leicester's 2022-2023 campaign, Paul sustained a knee injury that required surgery and prevented her from playing for the rest of the season. Leicester City released Paul at the end of the season.

In 2023, Paul signed with Burnley, from where she was subsequently loaned out to Huddersfield Town. In May 2024, it was confirmed that Paul would leave Burnley upon the expiration of her contract in the summer.

Paul then joined Watford FC in the Women's National League South, scoring on her club debut against Billericay Town in August 2024.

== International career ==
In 2023, Paul received her first call-up to the Jamaica national team amidst key player absences due to an ongoing dispute with the Jamaica Football Federation. She made her international debut on 23 February 2024, starting and playing 74 minutes of a 5–1 friendly defeat to Chile.
