= Jonathan Morgan (footballer) =

English football coach and former player

Managerial career
- Years: Team
- 2014–2021: Leicester City women
- 2022–2023: Burnley women
- 2023–2024: Sheffield United women

Jonathan Morgan is an English football coach and former player. He was previously the manager of Leicester City Women, Burnley Women and Sheffield United Women. As a player, he played in the Conference North.

== Career ==
=== 2014 to 2021: Leicester City and first allegations of misconduct ===
Morgan played football in the Conference North. He started his coaching career with Leicester City women's reserve team, and took charge of the senior team in 2014, when they were in FA Women's Midlands Division One. In 2018, Morgan helped Leicester to successfully apply for entry to the semi-professional FA Women's Championship. In 2020, Leicester women's team were taken over by their male counterparts; Morgan retained his job after the takeover. As of 2020, Morgan was applying for a UEFA A Licence.

Leicester won the 2020–21 FA Women's Championship, and were promoted to the FA Women's Super League for the 2021–22 season. Morgan was named the LMA Championship Manager of the Year for the 2020–21 season. On 25 November 2021, Morgan was sacked as Leicester manager, after the team lost their first eight matches in the WSL. He was replaced by Emile Heskey as interim Leicester manager, and his father and one of his sisters were also sacked by Leicester at the same time.

Later, on 2 February 2024, The Athletic published a story detailing the allegations resulting in Morgan's sacking, which included a three-year relationship Morgan engaged in with an unnamed teenage player while both were at Leicester. Morgan acknowledged the findings, disputing only the player's age when he started the relationship with her, but accused Sheffield United of engaging in a "witch hunt."

=== 2022 to 2023: Burnley ===
In May 2022, Morgan was appointed head coach of Burnley F.C. Women. Under his tenure, Burnley went unbeaten for the first 16 matches of the 2022–23 season and were undefeated in all 12 league matches that he coached Burnley.

=== 2023 to 2024: Sheffield United ===
In February 2023, Morgan became head coach of Sheffield United women's team.

=== Death of Maddy Cusack, investigation, and sacking by Sheffield United ===
In October 2023, following the death by suicide of Sheffield United player Maddy Cusack, Morgan became the subject of an internal club investigation, and temporarily stepped away from the club. Following the conclusion of the investigation, Morgan returned to work in January 2024. On 2 February, Sheffield United Women stated on Twitter that Morgan had departed the club, indicating that he had been sacked as new information had come to light.

== Personal life ==
Morgan lives in Glen Parva, Leicestershire. His sister Holly played for Leicester, and later became a first-team coach at the club. His other sister Jade has been the general manager of Leicester. Their father Rohan has been a chairman of the club.
