= Watford F.C. Women =

English women's association football club

Watford
- Full name: Watford Football Club Women
- Nickname: The Golden Girls
- Founded: 1970; 56 years ago
- Ground: Vicarage Road, Watford
- Capacity: 22,200
- Coordinates: 51°38′59″N 0°24′6″W
- Manager: Renée Hector
- League: Women's Super League 2
- 2025–26: FA Women's National League South, 1st of 12 (promoted)
- Website: watfordfc.com/women
Home colours	Away colours	Third colours

Watford F.C. Women are an English women's football club affiliated to Watford F.C. The club competes in the Women's Super League 2, with their home games played at Vicarage Road.

Watford played in the Women's Championship from the league's inception in 2014, after finishing runners-up in the FA Women's Premier League in 2013, until 2018–19. The club played in the third tier of the pyramid, the FA Women's National League South, from 2018–19 to 2020–21, before they were promoted back to the Women's Championship. They returned to the FA Women's National League following relegation in the 2021–22 season, before being promoted again to the Women's Championship at the end of the 2022–23 season.

== History ==
Watford Ladies F.C. were first formed in 1970, originally as a Supporters Club, and later called 'Willy Walker Watford Wonders', named after the trainers at the club, John Williams and Mike Walker, who both also played for Watford.

In 2003, the club partnered itself with Watford F.C.. in 2007, the club won the Premier League Southern Division, winning promotion to the Premier League National Division.

In 2013 the Hornets finished second in the FA Women's Premier League National Division. On the pitch success was matched off the pitch as the club's application for a license to compete in the newly formed Women's Super League 2 was accepted.

The inaugural season got underway in April 2014, and the first game for Watford resulted in a 2–2 draw against Millwall Lionesses, with 330 in attendance. Impressive form away from home meant that Watford were in third place as the season approached the half-way point; however, some misfortune with injuries meant this form couldn't be maintained, and the club finished seventh.

The follow-up season ultimately proved to be a difficult one in terms of results, but there was success in other avenues. Watford's opening home league game against Aston Villa was held at Vicarage Road and attracted a fantastic crowd of 1,102. It wasn't the only impressive attendance of the season, as respective crowds of 465 (v Yeovil) and 514 (v Durham) saw the team play at Berkhamsted FC.

The team line up against MK Dons in 2020

Having taken over the managerial position in the 2011–12 season and the general manager role for the start of the WSL, John Salomon had plenty to do with the upward trajectory at the Hornets. He stepped down from both roles at the end of the season to begin a new role with the FA. It meant there were two positions to fill. Ellie Kemp came on board as general manager, while Katie Rowson took on the position of head coach.

The third season again proved to be a difficult one on the field, but back-to-back home wins were recorded against Everton and Oxford United. Most importantly it was a campaign where Watford Ladies came under the umbrella of Watford FC for the first time, with the men's set-up giving plenty of support. One of the big changes was the club moving away from the grassroots set-up and Watford Ladies Youth.

With the WSL transitioning from a summer league to a winter league, it meant a mini nine-game season took place at the beginning of 2017. It was a much better time on the pitch, as the Golden Girls led by new head coach Keith Boanas earned eight points in a five-game period, more than they had earned in the entirety of either 2015 or 2016.

Watford also moved to a new home ground, with Kings Langley becoming the home of the Hornets, a partnership that continues to be fruitful for both to this day. Ed Henderson had helped stabilise the club during the Spring Series, having taken over as interim general manager. His work continued in the summer as he secured several new sponsorships and continued to build the profile of Watford, with 823 turning up for the game against Arsenal. It was another challenging season, as the club announced in November that they would not be applying for a WSL licence, which would cause them to be relegated back to the National League Southern Division. This caused the grasroots and elite girls sides to break away from the club and form the independent 'Watford Ladies F.C.'. However there were plenty of bright spots in the second half of 2017–18. Armand Kavaja and Clinton Lancaster were put in charge and handed a number of young players their opportunities in the first-team fold. The coaching staff had played a big role in developing the players and performances were much-improved towards the end, with a 2–1 win at Oxford United the highlight.

The new make-up of the Women's football pyramid was confirmed on 28 May 2018 and despite a strong application, Watford were put in the FA Women's National League (Tier 3) rather than the FA Women's Championship (Tier 2).

In September 2019, Clinton Lancaster took the position of head coach, with Kavaja taking up an assistant role. The Golden Girls were on-track for potential promotion when the 2019–20 season was declared null and void due to the coronavirus pandemic in March 2020.

The name 'Watford FC Women' replaced the name 'Watford FC Ladies' in August 2020, with the club saying the new name was "representative of a modern view on language and equality and is in keeping with the way our governing bodies, supporters, squad and management regard the women's game".

In the 2020–21 season, Watford Women were promoted back into the second tier after a three season absence, due to The FA approving the club’s application for upward movement.

In the middle of 2022, Watford Women agreed to play the upcoming season at Grosvenor Vale the home of Wealdstone F.C. and on 1 July they signed striker Bianca Baptiste from Crystal Palace to join them for their 2022–2023 season.

In the 2022–23 season, Watford Women managed to win promotion to the Women's Championship after finishing 1st in the Southern Premier Division and then managed to beat Northern Premier Division winners Nottingham Forest Women in the Championship play off.

The 2023–24 season saw the team relegated back to The National League South (tier 3), but after two seasons they won promotion in the 2025–26 season back up to the Women's Super League 2.

== Players ==
=== Current squad ===
As of 20 August 2026

Note: Flags indicate national team as defined under FIFA eligibility rules; some limited exceptions apply. Players may hold more than one non-FIFA nationality.

No.	Pos.	Nation	Player
1	GK	ENG	Demi Lambourne
2	DF	ENG	Zara Bailey
3	DF	ENG	Grace Garrad
4	MF	WAL	Anna Filbey
5	DF	ENG	Lucy Lyon
6	DF	ENG	Hannah Greenwood
7	FW	JAM	Lachante Paul
8	MF	ENG	Ava Kuyken
9	FW	ENG	Madison Perry
10	FW	WAL	Phoebie Poole
11	FW	WAL	Tianna Teisar
12	DF	ENG	Eden Skyers
13	GK	ENG	Chloe Sansom

No.	Pos.	Nation	Player
14	DF	ENG	Eva Gray
15	MF	IRL	Aoibheann Clancy
16	FW	ENG	Karin Muya
17	DF	ENG	Megan Chandler (captain)
18	MF	ENG	Poppy Wilson
19	MF	ENG	Ellie Noble
20	FW	IRL	Saoirse Noonan
21	FW	ENG	Flo Fyfe
23	MF	ENG	Coral-Jade Haines
24	MF	ENG	Vera Jones (on loan from Chelsea)
25	GK	HUN	Naomi Williams
39	GK	WAL	Safia Middleton-Patel (on loan from Manchester United)

== Club Officials and Staff ==
Position	Name
Secretary Football	(Indonesia) Muhammad Yusuf Chatyawan
Head of Women's Football	(Wales) Helen Ward
First-Team Head Coach	(England) Renée Hector
First-Team Coach	(Cyprus) Spyros Mylordos
Goalkeeper Coach	(England) Daniel Saunders
Sports Rehabilitator	(England) Tom Colbert
Strength and Conditioning Coach	(England) Julian Renner

== Honours ==
=== League ===
- FA Women's National League (level 3)
  - Southern champions: 2022–23
  - Tier playoff champions: 2022–23
- FA Women's Premier League
  - National Division (level 2) – runners-up: 2012–13
  - Southern Division (level 2) – champions: 2006–07
  - Reserve Southern Division 2 – champions: 2012–13

=== Cup ===
- Hertfordshire County Football Association
  - Women's Challenge Cup – winners: 2004–05, 2005–06, 2006–07, 2007–08, 2009–10
  - Women's Challenge Cup – finalists: 2008–09, 2010–11, 2012–13
- FA Women's National League Cup – runners-up: 2022–23
