= Kirstie Levell =

English footballer

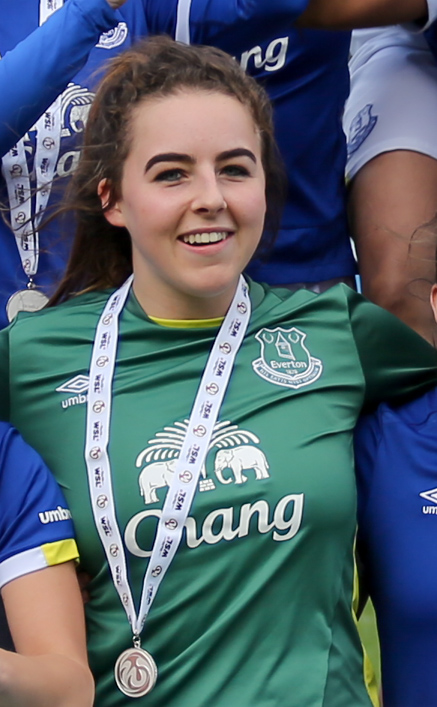

Personal information
- Full name: Kirstie Levell
- Date of birth: 7 January 1997 (age 29)
- Place of birth: Birkenhead, Merseyside, England
- Height: 1.71 m (5 ft 7 in)
- Position: Goalkeeper

Team information
- Current team: Burnley
- Number: 28

Youth career
- Everton

Senior career*
Years	Team	Apps	(Gls)
2015–2020	Everton	51	(0)
2020–2023	Leicester City	45	(0)
2023–	Burnley	20	(0)

International career^{‡}
2013	England U17	5	(0)
- * Club domestic league appearances and goals as of 4 February 2021 ‡ National team caps and goals as of 6 January 2018

Kirstie Levell (born 7 January 1997) is a football goalkeeper for Burnley wearing the number 28 for her brother. She has represented England at under-17, under-19 and under-23 levels.

== Club career ==
=== Everton ===
Having been brought up through the Everton youth ranks, Levell made her debut for the first team during the 2015 FA WSL season at the age of 18. She made 16 appearances during her first season and become a regular starter for the Blues. Levell was the starting keeper during the 2017 Spring Series, playing all games as Everton won the WSL 2 title. Following promotion, Everton signed Lizzie Durack to add competition to the goalkeeper group. Levell played every league game during the 2018–19 season. In the 2019–20 season, Everton signed Finnish international Tinja-Riikka Korpela and England youth international Sandy MacIver, limiting Levell to three League Cup appearances. On 28 May 2020, it was confirmed Levell had left Everton following the expiration of her contract.

=== Leicester City ===
On 22 August, Levell announced her move to FA Women's Championship club Leicester City ahead of the 2020–21 season, amongst a host of new signings to the newly-professional club. Levell selected the shirt number 28, in memory of her late brother, who died on that date in September 2015.

Levell played every game and was part of the Leicester City squad that won the 2020/21 FA Women's Championship.

== International career ==
Levell represented England on the under-17 national team during the 2013 UEFA Women's Under-17 Championship. Levell has also represented the England U-19s at 2014 UEFA Women's Under-19 Championship and England U-23s.

As of 2022, Levell is eligible for Scotland and stated in an interview with Her Football Hub that an international career with Scotland was her preference.

== Honours ==
=== Club ===
==== Everton ====
- FA WSL 2 Spring Series: 2017

==== Leicester City ====
- FA Women's Championship: 2020–21

=== Individual ===
- FA Women's Championship Golden Glove: 2020–21 (shared)
