= Demi Lambourne =

English footballer (born 1996)

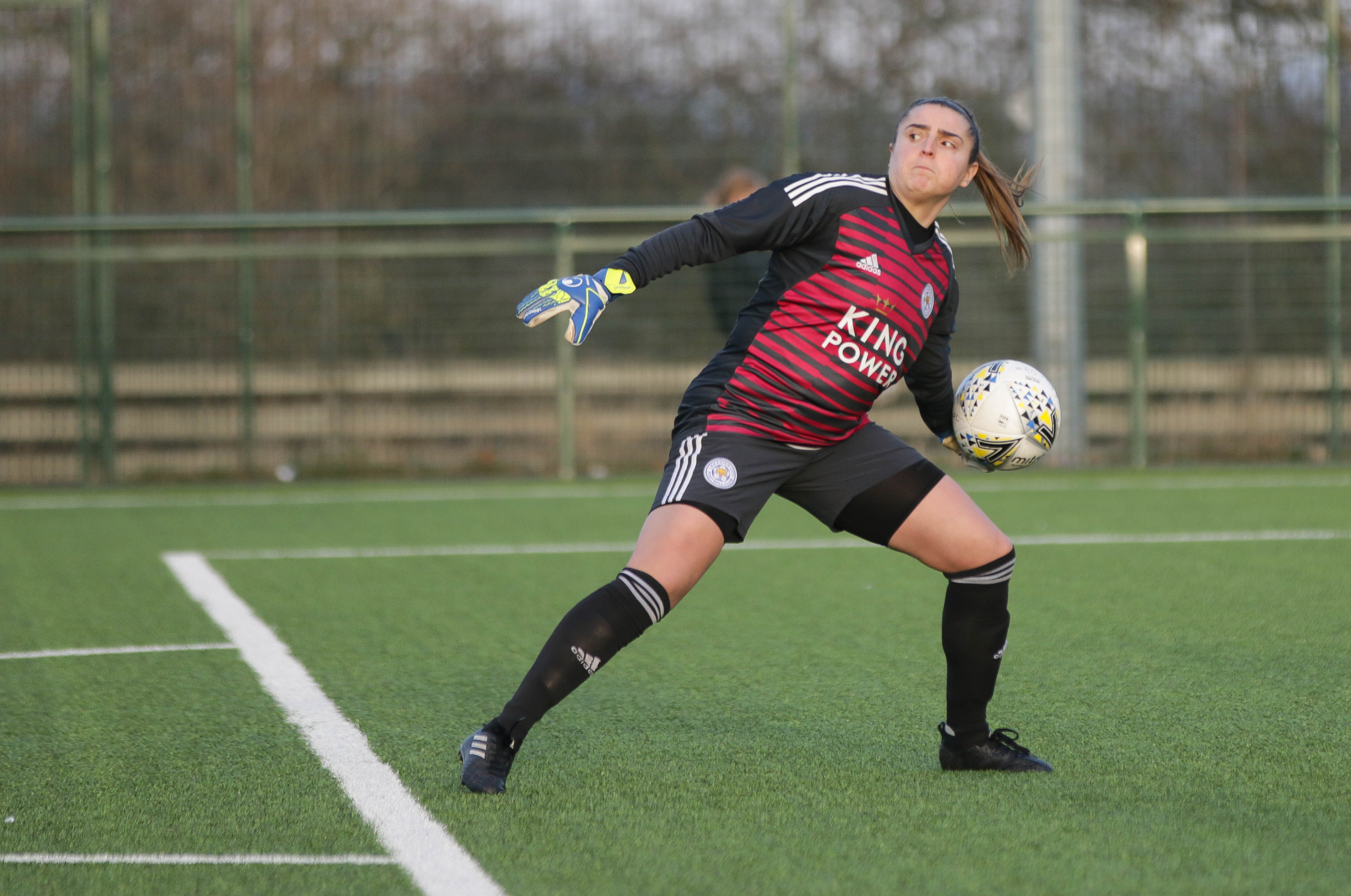
- Lambourne playing for Leicester City in 2019

Personal information
- Full name: Demi Ellen Lambourne
- Date of birth: 30 April 1996 (age 30)
- Place of birth: Oxford, England,
- Height: 1.75 m (5 ft 9 in)
- Position: Goalkeeper

Team information
- Current team: Sunderland

Youth career
- Oxford United

Senior career*
Years	Team	Apps	(Gls)
2014–2018	Oxford United	17	(0)
2018–2024	Leicester City	46	(0)
2023	→ Coventry United (loan)	0	(0)
2023–2024	→ Crystal Palace (loan)	9	(0)
2024–2026	Sunderland	0+	(0)
2026–	Watford	0	(0)
- * Club domestic league appearances and goals as of 21:21, 12 March 2024 (UTC)

Demi Ellen Lambourne (born 30 April 1996) is an English goalkeeper who plays for Women's Super League 2 club Watford.

== Early life ==
Lambourne is from Oxford and began playing for Oxford United's centre of excellence.

== Club career ==
In the 2014 FA WSL season Oxford joined the inaugural FA WSL 2 and Lambourne made 18 appearances in her first season in senior football, following an injury to the club's regular goalkeeper Hannah Cox.

In 2015 Lambourne established herself as Oxford's recognised first-choice goalkeeper, and signed a new contract with the club.

Lambourne signed for Leicester City in August 2018. She made her FA WSL debut in November 2021, in a 1–0 defeat by Everton at Pirelli Stadium.

On 28 September 2023, Lambourne signed on loan with Crystal Palace for the 2023–24 Women's Championship season.

On 29 July 2026, Lambourne was announced at Watford.

== International career ==
In June 2015 Lambourne was called up to the England under-19 team.

== Personal life ==
Lambourne is in a long-term relationship with her girlfriend Freya Kerry.
