= Sheffield United W.F.C. =

Sheffield United Women
- Full name: Sheffield United Women Football Club
- Nickname: The Blades
- Founded: 2002; 24 years ago (as Sheffield United Community Girls and Ladies)
- Ground: Bramall Lane, Sheffield
- Coordinates: 53°22′13″N 1°28′15″W
- Chairman: Lee Walshaw
- Manager: Stephen Healy
- League: Barclays Women's Super League 2
- 2025–26: WSL 2, 11th of 12
- Website: sufc.co.uk/women
Home colours	Away colours	Third colours

Sheffield United Women Football Club is an English women's football club based in Sheffield, South Yorkshire. The club currently plays in the Women's Super League 2 (WSL2).

== History ==
In his role as Sheffield United's Community Officer, Tony Currie founded a female team called Sheffield Hallam United in 1993. When this team folded after five seasons, one of Currie's coaches Andy Keenan began hosting sessions for Year Five girls in Heeley. Despite only five players attending the first training session, they entered a local youth league in 1998–99 as Sheffield United Community Girls.

In 2002, an adult East Midlands Regional Women's Football League club called Sheffield Inter (formerly Inter Owls) were close to folding and Sheffield United Community Girls and Ladies successfully bid to take their place in 2002–03. Under new manager Derek Baxby the club finished 5th in its first season, 3rd in its second season and then finished as runners-up to Derby County in 2004–05. Inspired by 75-goal striker Jodie Michalska, the club secured promotion to the Midland Combination Women's Football League in 2005–06.

In July 2022 it was announced that all league and cup matches in the 2022–23 season would be played at Bramall Lane.

In December 2024, it was announced that COH Sports had completed the purchase of Blades Leisure Ltd., the company that owned the team. It was reported that COH Sports had been created by a group of American investors.

Sheffield United finished bottom of the league in the 2024–25 Women's Championship, but avoided relegation due to Blackburn Rovers failing to meet the league's minimum standards and consequently being relegated. On 30 September 2025, it was announced that the club and manager Ash Thompson had mutually agreed to terminate Thompson's contract, with Luke Turner being named as interim manager.

== Players ==
=== Current squad ===
As of 13 September 2026

Note: Flags indicate national team as defined under FIFA eligibility rules; some limited exceptions apply. Players may hold more than one non-FIFA nationality.

No.	Pos.	Nation	Player
1	GK	ENG	Sian Rogers
2	DF	ENG	Leanne Cowan
3	DF	SCO	Chloe Warrington
4	MF	ENG	Ella Kinzett (captain)
5	DF	ENG	Molly Graham
6	DF	ENG	Gracie Pearse
7	FW	ENG	Amy Andrews
9	FW	IRL	Joy Ralph
10	MF	ENG	Charlie Devlin
11	FW	ENG	Ava Baker (on loan from Birmingham City
12	DF	IRL	Maria Reynolds
13	GK	WAL	Poppy Soper
14	MF	TUR	Halle Houssein (on loan from West Ham)

No.	Pos.	Nation	Player
15	FW	IRL	Lucy Quinn
17	MF	ENG	Tilly Bristow
19	FW	ENG	Grace Foy
20	DF	ENG	Sophie O'Rourke
21	FW	ENG	Lauren Thomas
22	DF	ENG	Sophie Harwood (on loan from Arsenal)
23	MF	NIR	Connie Scofield
25	MF	ENG	Mollie Rouse
28	FW	ENG	Eva Butler
41	DF	ENG	Jess Reavill
--	FW	ENG	Alyssa Aherne

== Managers ==
As of 20 April, 2026:

Name	Tenure	Refs
Dan O'Hearne	2014 – 17 January 2018	
(England) Carla Ward	17 January 2018 – 7 July 2020	
(England) Neil Redfearn	28 August 2020 – 25 November 2022	
Luke Turner (interim)	25 November 2022 – 14 February 2023	
(England) Jonathan Morgan	14 February 2023 – 2 February 2024	
Luke Turner (interim)	2 February 2024 – 19 July 2024	
Ash Thompson	19 July 2024 – 30 September 2025	
Luke Turner (interim)	30 September 2025 – 25 January 2026	
Stephen Healey	25 January 2026 –	
