= 2020–21 FA Women's Championship =

FA Women's Championship
- Season: 2020–21
- Champions: Leicester City
- Relegated: London Bees
- Matches: 116
- Goals: 295 (2.54 per match)
- Top goalscorer: 19 goals Katie Wilkinson (Sheffield United)
- Biggest home win: Durham 7–1 Coventry United (2 May 2021)
- Biggest away win: Coventry United 1–9 Leicester City (15 November 2020)
- Highest scoring: Coventry United 1–9 Leicester City (15 November 2020)
- All statistics correct as of 2 May 2021.

The 2020–21 FA Women's Championship was the third season of the rebranded FA Women's Championship, the second tier of women's football in England. It was renamed from the FA WSL 2 which was founded in 2014. The season began on 5 September 2020.

On 4 April 2021, Leicester City clinched the league title with a 2–0 win over London City Lionesses, their twelfth consecutive league victory dating back to 4–1 defeat at the hands of the same opposition on 1 November 2020. The result earned Leicester their first ever promotion to the top-flight FA WSL.

On the same day, London Bees' defeat away at Charlton Athletic coupled with a win for Coventry United against Blackburn Rovers sealed London Bees' relegation to the National League. It marked the first time since the 2012–13 FA Women's Premier League a club had been relegated from the second-tier on sporting merit.

== Teams ==
Location of clubs for the 2020–21 season

Twelve teams were originally scheduled to compete in the Championship for the 2020–21 season, an increase of one team from the previous season. This was a planned progression of the restructuring of the English women's game, a move prompted to provide for a fully professional Women's Super League (WSL) starting with the 2018–19 season. Membership of both the first and second tier is subject to a license, based on a series of off-the-field criteria.

However, while the movement between the WSL and Championship was honoured with Aston Villa earning promotion and Liverpool taking their place, there was no relegation or promotion between the Championship and National League after the seasons from tier three and below were null and voided and results had been expunged. One team was scheduled to be relegated and replaced by the two winners of both the National League North and South divisions. At the time the season was curtailed, Charlton Athletic were declared bottom of the Championship on a points-per-game with Sunderland and Crawley Wasps leading the National League Premier Divisions prior to the cancellation. Without that movement between the second and third tiers, the season was again contested by eleven teams.

Team	Location	Ground	Capacity	2019–20 season
Blackburn Rovers	Bamber Bridge	Sir Tom Finney Stadium	3,000	7th
Charlton Athletic	Bexley	The Oakwood	1,180	11th
Coventry United	Coventry	Butts Park Arena	4,000	10th
Crystal Palace	Bromley	Hayes Lane	5,000	9th
Durham	Durham	Maiden Castle		3rd
Leicester City	Quorn	Farley Way Stadium	1,400	6th
Lewes	Lewes	The Dripping Pan	3,000	8th
Liverpool	Birkenhead	Prenton Park	16,587	WSL, 12th
London Bees	Canons Park	The Hive Stadium	5,176	5th
London City Lionesses	Dartford	Princes Park	4,100	4th
Sheffield United	Chesterfield	Technique Stadium	10,504	2nd

=== Managerial changes ===
Team	Outgoing manager	Manner of departure	Date of vacancy	Position in table	Incoming manager	Date of appointment
London City Lionesses	(England) John Bayer (interim)	End of interim period	27 May 2020	End of season (4th)	(Republic of Ireland) Lisa Fallon	27 May 2020
Sheffield United	(England) Carla Ward	Mutual separation	7 July 2020	End of season (2nd)	(England) Neil Redfearn	28 August 2020
London City Lionesses	(Republic of Ireland) Lisa Fallon	Personal reasons	9 October 2020	10th	(United States) Melissa Phillips	9 October 2020
Liverpool	(England) Vicky Jepson	Mutual consent	12 January 2021	3rd	(England) Amber Whiteley (interim)	12 January 2021
London Bees	(England) Lee Burch	Sacked	10 February 2021	9th	(England) Sian Osmond (interim)	12 February 2021
Charlton Athletic	(England) Riteesh Mishra	Retained coaching role	16 March 2021	9th	(England) Karen Hills	16 March 2021

== Table ==
Pos	Team	Pld	W	D	L	GF	GA	GD	Pts	Qualification
1	Leicester City (C, P)	20	16	2	2	54	16	+38	50	Promotion to the WSL (Note: Dependent on obtaining a licence.)
2	Durham	20	12	6	2	34	15	+19	42	
3	Liverpool	20	11	6	3	37	15	+22	39	
4	Sheffield United	20	11	5	4	37	15	+22	38	
5	Lewes	20	8	4	8	19	22	−3	28	
6	London City Lionesses	20	6	6	8	19	19	0	24	
7	Crystal Palace	20	5	5	10	27	36	−9	20	
8	Charlton Athletic	20	4	7	9	19	29	−10	19	
9	Blackburn Rovers	20	4	6	10	20	31	−11	18	
10	Coventry United	20	5	1	14	21	51	−30	16	
11	London Bees (R)	20	3	2	15	14	52	−38	11	Relegation to the Southern Premier Division

Rules for classification: 1) Points; 2) Goal difference; 3) Number of goals scored
(C) Champions; (P) Promoted; (R) Relegated

== Results ==
Home \ Away	BLB	CHA	COV	CRY	DUR	LCW	LEW	LIV	LON	LCL	SHU
Blackburn Rovers	—	0–1	0–1	2–2	0–2	2–3	0–3	0–0	3–0	1–0	1–2
Charlton Athletic	1–1	—	2–3	2–2	2–1	0–2	1–1	2–2	3–1	0–1	0–1
Coventry United	0–1	0–2	—	5–2	3–4	1–9	0–1	1–2	3–1	1–0	0–3
Crystal Palace	2–3	1–1	3–1	—	0–1	1–4	2–1	0–1	5–0	1–1	0–3
Durham	0–0	1–1	7–1	2–0	—	0–2	3–0	2–0	1–0	1–0	1–1
Leicester City	3–0	4–0	2–0	1–0	2–2	—	1–0	2–1	3–0	2–0	2–1
Lewes	1–0	2–1	1–0	0–2	1–1	1–0	—	2–2	2–1	2–3	0–2
Liverpool	1–1	4–0	5–0	4–0	1–1	1–2	2–0	—	3–0	2–2	1–0
London Bees	3–2	1–0	1–1	1–4	1–2	0–7	1–0	0–3	—	0–0	2–4
London City Lionesses	3–0	0–0	2–0	0–0	0–1	4–1	0–1	0–1	2–1	—	1–4
Sheffield United	3–3	1–0	3–0	3–0	0–1	2–2	0–0	0–1	4–0	0–0	—

Source: FA WSL
Legend: Blue = home team win; Yellow = draw; Red = away team win.

== Top goalscorers ==
As of 2 May 2021

Rank	Player	Team	Goals
1	(England) Katie Wilkinson	Sheffield United	19
2	(England) Natasha Flint	Leicester City	17
3	(England) Beth Hepple	Durham	10
4	(England) Bianca Baptiste	Crystal Palace	8
5	(Jamaica) Lachante Paul	Leicester City	7
6	(England) Jess King	Charlton Athletic	6
6	(England) Emily Roberts	Durham	6
8	12 players		5

== Awards ==
=== Annual awards ===
Award	Winner	Club
Golden boot	(England) Katie Wilkinson	Sheffield United
Golden glove	(England) Megan Borthwick	Durham
Golden glove	(England) Kirstie Levell	Leicester City
Golden glove	(England) Fran Kitching	Sheffield United
Player of the season	(England) Katie Wilkinson	Sheffield United
Manager of the season	(England) Jonathan Morgan	Leicester City

== See also ==
- 2020–21 FA Women's League Cup
- 2020–21 FA WSL (tier 1)
- 2020–21 FA Women's National League (tier 3 & 4)
