= 2024–25 Crystal Palace F.C. (Women) season =

Crystal Palace
2024–25 season
- Head coach: Laura Kaminski (until 28 February); Leif Smerud (from 1 March)
- Stadium: Gander Green Lane, Sutton
- WSL: 12th (relegated)
- FA Cup: Quarter-finals
- League Cup: Group stage
- Top goalscorer: League: Annabel Blanchard and Katie Stengel (4); All: Ashleigh Weerden (7)
- Highest home attendance: 5,003 (vs. Chelsea, 27 September 2024)
- Lowest home attendance: 502 (vs. Everton, 10 November 2024)
- Average home league attendance: 1,836
- Biggest win: 6–1 v Sheffield United (H) (FA Cup, 14 January 2025)
- Biggest defeat: 0–7 v Chelsea (H) (WSL, 27 September 2024)
Home colours	Away colours	Third colours

The 2024–25 Crystal Palace F.C. (Women) season was the club's 32nd in existence, and their inaugural season as a top flight club having gained promotion to the Women's Super League, the highest level of the football pyramid, for the first time as 2023–24 Women's Championship winners. Along with competing in the WSL, the club also contested two domestic cup competitions: the FA Cup and the League Cup.

On 28 February, Crystal Palace sacked promotion-winning head coach Laura Kaminski with the team sat bottom of the table. Leif Smerud was announced as successor the following day. His most recent role had been as interim head coach of the Norway men's under-21 national team until 2023.

Crystal Palace's relegation from the Women's Super League was confirmed after only one season in the top flight. A heavy 7–1 defeat to West Ham United on 27 April 2025 confirmed their status with two games remaining and seven points adrift of Aston Villa in 11th place.

== Squad ==
As of 30 January 2025

Note: Flags indicate national team as defined under FIFA eligibility rules; some limited exceptions apply. Players may hold more than one non-FIFA nationality.

No.	Pos.	Nation	Player
2	DF	DEN	Katrine Veje
3	DF	ENG	Felicity Gibbons
4	MF	SCO	Chloe Arthur
5	MF	SWE	My Cato
6	DF	ENG	Aimee Everett (captain)
8	FW	ENG	Molly-Mae Sharpe
9	FW	WAL	Elise Hughes
10	FW	ENG	Annabel Blanchard
11	FW	NED	Ashleigh Weerden
14	MF	WAL	Josie Green
15	MF	IRL	Hayley Nolan
16	MF	FIN	Ria Öling
17	MF	ENG	Lexi Potter (on loan from Chelsea)

No.	Pos.	Nation	Player
19	GK	FIN	Milla-Maj Majasaari
20	FW	NZL	Indiah-Paige Riley
21	FW	CAN	Clarissa Larisey
22	MF	DEN	Mille Gejl
23	DF	WAL	Lily Woodham (on loan from Seattle Reign FC)
24	FW	ENG	Shanade Hopcroft
25	DF	NED	Aniek Nouwen (on loan from Chelsea)
27	FW	IRL	Abbie Larkin
28	FW	USA	Katie Stengel
29	DF	JAM	Allyson Swaby
30	GK	USA	Shae Yañez
31	GK	ENG	Annis-Clara Wright
77	MF	IRL	Isibeal Atkinson

== Preseason ==
Crystal Palace travelled to Salt Lake City for a week-long training camp at the Utah Royals training facility before playing them in a friendly. A further five preseason friendlies were confirmed by the club following their return to the UK, with Palace's trip to Bristol City the only one open to the public.

16 August 2024 Friendly	Utah Royals (United States)	3–0	Crystal Palace	Sandy, Utah, United States
19:00 MDT	Gibbons 53' (o.g.); Sentnor 70'; Riehl 81'	Report		Stadium: America First Field

1 September 2024 Friendly	Bristol City	3–1	Crystal Palace	Bristol
13:00	Lloyd-Smith; Ward; Woolley	Report	Sharpe	Stadium: Ashton Gate

8 September 2024 Friendly	Brighton & Hove Albion	–	Crystal Palace
				Attendance: Behind-closed-doors
Note: Scoreline not announced

12 September 2024 Friendly	Crystal Palace	4–0	(Netherlands) ADO Den Haag	Beckenham
17:30	Cato 5'; Larkin 8', 11'; Atkinson 61'	Report		Stadium: Crystal Palace Training Ground; Attendance: Behind-closed-doors

Friendly	Charlton Athletic	–	Crystal Palace
				Attendance: Behind-closed-doors
Note: Date and scoreline not announced

Friendly	Newcastle United	–	Crystal Palace
				Attendance: Behind-closed-doors
Note: Date and scoreline not announced

== Women's Super League ==
=== Results summary ===
Overall								Home						Away					
Pld	W	D	L	GF	GA	GD	Pts	W	D	L	GF	GA	GD	W	D	L	GF	GA	GD
22	2	4	16	20	65	−45	10	1	2	8	9	31	−22	1	2	8	11	34	−23

Last updated: 10 May 2025.
Source: WSL

=== Results by matchday ===
Round	1	2	3	4	5	6	7	8	9	10	11	12	13	14	15	16	17	18	19	20	21	22
Ground	A	H	A	H	A	H	H	A	A	H	A	H	A	A	H	H	A	H	A	H	H	A
Result	L	L	W	L	D	L	D	L	L	L	L	L	D	L	L	W	L	L	L	L	D	L
Position	11	12	8	8	9	9	10	12	12	12	12	12	12	12	12	12	12	12	12	12	12	12

A = Away; H = Home; W = Win; D = Draw; L = Loss

=== Results ===
22 September 2024 1	Tottenham Hotspur	4–0	Crystal Palace	Leyton
14:00	Raso 19'; Naz 53'; Spence 76'; Ahtinen 88'	Report	Gejl (yellow card) 46'; Gibbons (yellow card) 61'; Blanchard (yellow card) 62'; Everett (yellow card) 74'; Aspin (yellow card) 90+4' (yellow-red card) 90+4'	Stadium: Brisbane Road; Attendance: 1,778; Referee: Amy Fearn

27 September 2024 2	Crystal Palace	0–7	Chelsea	Selhurst
19:30	Blanchard (yellow card) 3'	Report	James (yellow card) 14', (goal) 58'; Beever-Jones 38'; Bronze 48'; Reiten 74', 90'; Björn 78'; Macario 90+5'	Stadium: Selhurst Park; Attendance: 5,003; Referee: Emily Heaslip

6 October 2024 3	Leicester City	0–2	Crystal Palace	Leicester
15:00	Goodwin (yellow card) 25'	Report	Blanchard 55', 68' (pen.)	Stadium: King Power Stadium; Attendance: 1,806; Referee: Stephen Parkinson

13 October 2024 4	Crystal Palace	0–1	Brighton & Hove Albion	Selhurst
14:00	Green (yellow card) 16'; Gejl (yellow card) 56'	Report	Vilamala 35'	Stadium: Selhurst Park; Attendance: 1,166; Referee: Kirsty Dowle

20 October 2024 5	Liverpool	1–1	Crystal Palace	St Helens
14:00	Kapocs 37'; Smith (yellow card) 52'	Report	Stengel 14'; Green (yellow card) 90+2'	Stadium: Totally Wicked Stadium; Attendance: 3,007; Referee: Amy Fearn

3 November 2024 6	Crystal Palace	0–3	Manchester City	Selhurst
14:00		Report	Park 40'; Roord 50'; Shaw 73'	Stadium: Selhurst Park; Attendance: 2,275; Referee: Lisa Benn

10 November 2024 7	Crystal Palace	1–1	Everton	Sutton
14:00	Riley 1'; Potter (yellow card) 86'	Report	Hayashi 72'	Stadium: Gander Green Lane; Attendance: 502; Referee: Kirsty Dowle

17 November 2024 8	Aston Villa	3–2	Crystal Palace	Aston
14:00	Patten 40'; Daly 45+5'; Salmon 90+4'	Report	Cato 30'; Woodham (yellow card) 45+8'; Blanchard 86'	Stadium: Villa Park; Attendance: 2,673; Referee: Grace Lowe

8 December 2024 9	West Ham United	5–2	Crystal Palace	Dagenham
14:30	Asseyi 17'; Piubel 36'; Paví 44'; Denton 82'; Gorry 90+2'	Report	Gejl 5'; Riley 11', (yellow card) 55'; Stengel (yellow card) 31'; Potter (yellow card) 85'	Stadium: Victoria Road; Attendance: 1,292; Referee: Lisa Benn

15 December 2024 10	Crystal Palace	0–1	Manchester United	Sutton
14:00		Report	Clinton 45+5', (yellow card) 85'; Bizet (yellow card) 82'	Stadium: Gander Green Lane; Attendance: 1,773; Referee: Amy Fearn

19 January 2025 11	Arsenal	5–0	Crystal Palace	Borehamwood
14:00	Williamson 6'; Russo 63'; Mead 67'; Caldentey 75' (pen.), 90+5'	Report	Potter (yellow card) 84'; Nolan (yellow card) 90+4'	Stadium: Meadow Park; Attendance: 3,576; Referee: Phoebe Cross

26 January 2025 12	Crystal Palace	2–3	Tottenham Hotspur	Sutton
14:00	Stengel 48'; Weerden 64'; Woodham (yellow card) 87'; Everett (yellow card) 90+3'	Report	England 14', 23'; Raso (yellow card) 17'; Holdt 90+5'	Stadium: Gander Green Lane; Attendance: 732; Referee: Lucy May

2 February 2025 13	Brighton & Hove Albion	1–1	Crystal Palace	Crawley
14:00	Woodham 18' (o.g.); Symonds (red card) 48'	Report	Majasaari (yellow card) 45+1'; Potter (yellow card) 58'; Woodham (yellow card) 59'; Larisey (yellow card) 66'; Cato 88'	Stadium: Broadfield Stadium; Attendance: 2,345; Referee: Stacey Fullicks

16 February 2025 14	Manchester United	3–1	Crystal Palace	Leigh
12:00	Terland 9', 64'; Clinton 85'; Mannion (yellow card) 90+5'	Report	Gejl 38'; Riley (yellow card) 59'; Öling (yellow card) 83'	Stadium: Leigh Sports Village; Attendance: 4,761; Referee: Amy Fearn

2 March 2025 15	Crystal Palace	0–1	Liverpool	Sutton
14:00	Woodham (yellow card) 51'; Potter (yellow card) 88'	Report	Matthews 10'; Smith (yellow card) 64'	Stadium: Gander Green Lane; Attendance: 1,386; Referee: Ryan Atkin

16 March 2025 16	Crystal Palace	3–1	Aston Villa	Sutton
14:00	Nouwen 33'; Weerden 53'; Stengel 90+5'	Report	Maritz (yellow card) 35'; Parker 85'	Stadium: Gander Green Lane; Attendance: 1,130; Referee: Stacey Fullicks

22 March 2025 17	Everton	3–0	Crystal Palace	Walton
14:00	Vanhaevermaet 43'; S. Holmgaard 46'; Gago 90+5'	Report		Stadium: Walton Hall Park; Attendance: 754; Referee: Adewunmi Soneye

30 March 2025 18	Crystal Palace	0–4	Arsenal	Sutton
14:00		Report	Mead 14', 90+1'; Russo 26'; Swaby 77' (o.g.)	Stadium: Gander Green Lane; Attendance: 2,885; Referee: Emily Heaslip

23 April 2025 19	Chelsea	4–0	Crystal Palace	Kingston upon Thames
19:15	Reiten 22' (pen.); Macario 24', 49'; Fishel 64'	Report	Cato (yellow card) 35'; Swaby (red card) 47'; Gejl (yellow card) 48'	Stadium: Kingsmeadow; Attendance: 1,509; Referee: Grace Lowe
Note: This match, originally scheduled for 20 April, was rescheduled due to Chelsea's participation in the UEFA Champions League semi-finals

27 April 2025 20	Crystal Palace	1–7	West Ham United	Sutton
12:30	Nouwen (yellow card) 57'; Stengel 80' (pen.)	Report	Denton (yellow card) 9'; Martinez 18', 42', 45', 62'; Asseyi 70'; Harries 86', 90+4'; Brynjarsdóttir (yellow card) 90+1'	Stadium: Gander Green Lane; Attendance: 1,503; Referee: Kirsty Dowle

4 May 2025 21	Crystal Palace	2–2	Leicester City	Sutton
14:00	Blanchard 69' (pen.), (yellow card) 82'; Larkin 90+8'	Report	Cain 45+2'; O'Brien 90+4'	Stadium: Gander Green Lane

10 May 2025 22	Manchester City	5–2	Crystal Palace	Manchester
12:30	Kerolin 17', 86'; Roord 64'; Knaak 67', 90+4'	Report	Weerden 4'; Gejl 40'	Stadium: Academy Stadium

=== League table ===
Pos	Team	Pld	W	D	L	GF	GA	GD	Pts	Qualification or relegation
8	Everton	22	6	6	10	24	32	−8	24	
9	West Ham United	22	6	5	11	36	41	−5	23	
10	Leicester City	22	5	5	12	21	37	−16	20	
11	Tottenham Hotspur	22	5	5	12	26	44	−18	20	
12	Crystal Palace (R)	22	2	4	16	20	65	−45	10	Relegation to the WSL2

Source: The Football Association
Rules for classification: 1) Points; 2) Goal difference; 3) Number of goals scored.
(R) Relegated

== Women's FA Cup ==
As a member of the first tier, Crystal Palace entered the FA Cup in the fourth round proper.

14 January 2025 Fourth round	Crystal Palace	6–1	Sheffield United	Sutton
19:00	Sharpe 6'; Weerden 29', 61'; Gejl (yellow card) 40', (goal) 52'; Cato 71'; Page 89' (o.g.)	Report	Bailey (yellow card) 73'; Aherne 74'	Stadium: Gander Green Lane; Attendance: 164; Referee: Ella Broad
Note: Rescheduled from 12 January due to frozen pitch.

9 February 2025 Fifth round	Crystal Palace	2–0	Newcastle United	Sutton
13:00	Weerden 81'; Larkin 90+4'	Report		Stadium: Gander Green Lane; Referee: Megan Wilson

9 March 2025 Quarter-finals	Chelsea	1–0	Crystal Palace	Kingston upon Thames
14:30	James 64'	Report	Gibbons (yellow card) 41'; Yanez (yellow card) 53'; Woodham (yellow card) 76'; Sharpe (yellow card) 90+7'	Stadium: Kingsmeadow; Attendance: 2,266; Referee: Amy Fearn

== Women's League Cup ==
Crystal Palace entered the League Cup at the group stage.

2 October 2024 Group stage	Aston Villa	2–0	Crystal Palace	Walsall
19:15	Hanson 80'; Robinson 90+2'	Report	Cato (yellow card) 59'	Stadium: Bescot Stadium; Attendance: 422; Referee: Adewunmi Soneye

24 November 2024 Group stage	Crystal Palace	2–0	Charlton Athletic	Sutton
14:00	Weerden 11'; Gejl 24'	Report		Stadium: Gander Green Lane; Attendance: 172; Referee: Adewunmi Soneye

11 December 2024 Group stage	Crystal Palace	0–2	Tottenham Hotspur	Sutton
19:00	Atkinson (yellow card) 26'; Weerden (yellow card) 87'	Report	Vinberg 50'; Dennis 71'; Neville (yellow card) 88'	Stadium: Gander Green Lane; Attendance: 257; Referee: Emily Heaslip

Pos	Team	Pld	W	WPEN	LPEN	L	GF	GA	GD	Pts	Qualification	TOT	AST	CRY	CHA
1	Tottenham Hotspur	3	3	0	0	0	5	1	+4	9	Advanced to knock-out stage	—	1–0	–	–
2	Aston Villa	3	2	0	0	1	6	2	+4	6		–	—	2–0	4–1
3	Crystal Palace	3	1	0	0	2	2	4	−2	3		0–2	–	—	2–0
4	Charlton Athletic	3	0	0	0	3	2	8	−6	0		1–2	–	–	—

Updated to match(es) played on 23 November 2024. Source: Women's League Cup
Rules for classification: 1) Points; 2) Goal difference; 3) Number of goals scored; 4) Number of wins; 5) Head-to-head record

== Squad statistics ==
=== Appearances ===
As of match played 10 May 2025

Starting appearances are listed first, followed by substitute appearances after the + symbol where applicable.

No.	Pos	Nat	Player	Total		WSL		FA Cup		League Cup	
No.	Pos	Nat	Player	Apps	Goals	Apps	Goals	Apps	Goals	Apps	Goals
2	DF	(Denmark) DEN	Katrine Veje	20	0	12+4	0	2	0	1+1	0
3	DF	(England) ENG	Felicity Gibbons	13	0	4+4	0	1+1	0	2+1	0
4	MF	(Scotland) SCO	Chloe Arthur	11	0	3+3	0	1+1	0	3	0
5	MF	(Sweden) SWE	My Cato	27	3	19+2	2	2+1	1	1+2	0
6	DF	(England) ENG	Aimee Everett	15	1	11	0	1	1	2+1	0
8	FW	(England) ENG	Molly-Mae Sharpe	20	0	7+8	0	2	0	3	0
9	FW	(Wales) WAL	Elise Hughes	8	0	0+6	0	0+2	0	0	0
10	FW	(England) ENG	Annabel Blanchard	24	4	12+6	4	3	0	3	0
11	FW	(Netherlands) NED	Ashleigh Weerden	28	7	14+8	3	3	3	3	1
14	MF	(Wales) WAL	Josie Green	19	0	15+2	0	1+1	0	0	0
15	MF	(Republic of Ireland) IRL	Hayley Nolan	12	0	10	0	1	0	1	0
16	MF	(Finland) FIN	Ria Öling	6	0	2+3	0	0+1	0	0	0
17	MF	(England) ENG	Lexi Potter	23	0	18+1	0	2	0	0+2	0
19	GK	(Finland) FIN	Milla-Maj Majasaari	7	0	3	0	1	0	3	0
20	FW	(New Zealand) NZL	Indiah-Paige Riley	19	2	11+4	2	2	0	0+2	0
21	FW	(Canada) CAN	Clarissa Larisey	11	0	6+3	0	1+1	0	0	0
22	MF	(Denmark) DEN	Mille Gejl	21	5	17	3	2	1	2	1
23	DF	(Wales) WAL	Lily Woodham	24	0	19+1	0	3	0	1	0
24	FW	(England) ENG	Shanade Hopcroft	3	0	1+2	0	0	0	0	0
25	DF	(Netherlands) NED	Aniek Nouwen	4	1	4	1	0	0	0	0
27	FW	(Republic of Ireland) IRL	Abbie Larkin	26	2	5+15	1	0+3	1	3	0
28	FW	(United States) USA	Katie Stengel	26	4	20	4	1+2	0	0+3	0
29	DF	(Jamaica) JAM	Allyson Swaby	10	0	8	0	2	0	0	0
30	GK	(United States) USA	Shae Yañez	21	0	19	0	2	0	0	0
31	GK	(England) ENG	Annis-Clara Wright	0	0	0	0	0	0	0	0
77	MF	(Republic of Ireland) IRL	Isibeal Atkinson	8	0	0+4	0	0+1	0	2+1	0
Players who left the club during the season:
12	FW	(England) ENG	Poppy Pritchard	6	0	0+3	0	0	0	1+2	0
29	DF	(England) ENG	Jorja Fox	0	0	0	0	0	0	0	0
32	DF	(England) ENG	Brooke Aspin	6	0	2+2	0	0	0	2	0

== Transfers ==
=== Transfers in ===
Date	Position	Nationality	Name	From	Ref.
1 August 2024	DF	(Denmark)	Katrine Veje	(England) Everton	
2 August 2024	GK	(United States)	Shae Yañez	(England) Bristol City	
7 August 2024	FW	(New Zealand)	Indiah-Paige Riley	(Netherlands) PSV	
9 August 2024	FW	(Netherlands)	Ashleigh Weerden	(Netherlands) Ajax	
15 August 2024	MF	(Denmark)	Mille Gejl	(United States) North Carolina Courage	
31 August 2024	MF	(Wales)	Josie Green	(England) Leicester City	
31 August 2024	GK	(Finland)	Milla-Maj Majasaari	(Belgium) Anderlecht	
1 September 2024	MF	(Sweden)	My Cato	(Sweden) Norrköping	
13 September 2024	FW	(United States)	Katie Stengel	(United States) Gotham FC	
18 January 2025	FW	(Canada)	Clarissa Larisey	(Sweden) BK Häcken	
22 January 2025	MF	(Finland)	Ria Öling	(Sweden) FC Rosengård	
30 January 2025	DF	(Jamaica)	Allyson Swaby	(Italy) Milan	

=== Loans in ===
Date	Position	Nationality	Name	From	Until	Ref.
15 August 2024	DF	(England)	Jorja Fox	(England) Chelsea	4 January 2025	
31 August 2024	MF	(England)	Lexi Potter	(England) Chelsea	End of season	
7 September 2024	DF	(England)	Brooke Aspin	(England) Chelsea	4 January 2025	
13 September 2024	FW	(England)	Poppy Pritchard	(England) Manchester City	13 January 2025	
13 September 2024	DF	(Wales)	Lily Woodham	(United States) Seattle Reign	End of season	
30 January 2025	DF	(Netherlands)	Aniek Nouwen	(England) Chelsea	End of season	

=== Transfers out ===
Date	Position	Nationality	Name	To	Ref.
17 May 2024	DF	(Australia)	Polly Doran	(Sweden) Linköping	
17 May 2024	MF	(Wales)	Anna Filbey	(England) Watford	
17 May 2024	MF	(England)	Shauna Guyatt	(England) Ipswich Town	
17 May 2024	DF	(England)	Annabel Johnson	Retired	
17 May 2024	GK	(England)	Natalia Negri	(England) Ipswich Town	
17 May 2024	MF	(England)	Ellie Noble	(England) Blackburn Rovers	
17 June 2024	GK	(England)	Fran Kitching		
17 June 2024	MF	(Scotland)	Kirsten Reilly	(Scotland) Hibernian	

=== Loans out ===
Date	Position	Nationality	Name	To	Until	Ref.
2 September 2024	MF	(England)	Isabella Sibley	(England) Newcastle United	End of season	
