= Poppy Pritchard =

English footballer (born 2005)

Personal information
- Date of birth: 3 December 2005 (age 20)
- Place of birth: England
- Position: Centre-forward

Team information
- Current team: Leicester City
- Number: 9

Youth career
- Durham

Senior career*
Years	Team	Apps	(Gls)
2022–2024	Durham	4	(2)
2024–2026	Manchester City	0	(0)
2024–2025	→ Crystal Palace (loan)	3	(0)
2025	→ Newcastle United (loan)	2	(0)
2025–2026	→ Durham (loan)	11	(0)
2026	→ Celtic (loan)	12	(0)
2026–	Leicester City	8	(0)

International career^{‡}
2023–	England U19	13	(13)
- * Club domestic league appearances and goals as of 15 November 2026 ‡ National team caps and goals as of 24 July 2024

Poppy Pritchard (born 3 December 2005) is an English professional footballer who plays as a forward for Women's Super League 2 club Leicester City. She previously played for Manchester City, Durham, on loan for Crystal Palace, Newcastle United and Celtic, and the England under-19 team.

== Club career ==
An academy product of Women's Championship club Durham, Pritchard started her senior career at Durham, making a total of 22 appearances and scoring twice. She made 4 appearances in the 2022–23 Championship season, followed by another 13 in the 2023–24 season.

On 22 November 2022, Pritchard scored a hat trick for Durham under-21 team against Manchester United, becoming the first team to win against United's U21 side with a 3–2 result. In the 2022–23 season, she scored at total of 18 goals and provided 3 assists for Durham U21 team.

On 31 January 2024, Pritchard signed for Manchester City on a three-and-a-half-year deal, after interest from several WSL clubs including Tottenham Hotspur.

On 13 September 2024, Pritchard joined Crystal Palace on loan for the 2024–25 season. The loan ended on 13 January 2025 and she returned to Manchester City. Five days later, she joined Women's Championship club Newcastle United on loan for the remainder of the 2024–25 season.

On 4 September 2025, Durham announced that Pritchard had returned to the club on a season-long loan from Manchester City for the 2025-26 season. Having made 15 appearances and two assists in all competitions for Durham in the 2025-26 season, it was announced on 15 January 2026, that she had been recalled by Manchester City.

On 23 January 2026, Celtic announced the signing of Pritchard, alongside City teammate Tara O'Hanlon, for the remainder of the 2025–26 season.

On 17 August 2026, Pritchard joined recently-relegated WSL 2 side Leicester City on a three-year contract.

== International career ==
On 20 September 2023, Pritchard scored within 15 minutes of her youth international debut with England under-19s, in a 5–0 win over Denmark, followed by a brace against Germany in a 3–3 draw six days later. For 2024 Under-19 Championship qualification on 25 October 2023, she scored the fifth goal against Wales in a 6–1 victory, and provided two assists. On 1 December 2023, as the number 9 striker, she scored two goals in the 5–1 win over Sweden.

In April 2024, during Round 2 of U19 Championship qualification, Pritchard scored the opening goal against Switzerland in a 2–0 victory, followed by a brace against Italy in a 4–1 win, helping the team to qualify for the final tournament in Lithuania. With 9 goals in 9 appearances for the under-19s, BBC Sport described Pritchard as a player to "look out for" in the tournament. In July, Pritchard scored a hat-trick in England's opening group stage match of the tournament in a 10–0 victory over Lithuania, followed by scoring the winning goal against France to win the group.

== Career statistics ==
As of match played 11 December 2024.

Appearances and goals by club, season and competition
Club	Season	League			FA Cup (Note: Includes the Women's FA Cup)		League Cup (Note: Includes the WSL Cup/Women's League Cup)		Continental (Note: Includes the UEFA Women's Champions League)		Total	
Club	Season	Division	Apps	Goals	Apps	Goals	Apps	Goals	Apps	Goals	Apps	Goals
Durham	2022–23	Women's Championship	4	0	0	0	0	0	—		4	0
Durham	2023–24	Women's Championship	13	2	1	0	3	0	—		17	2
Durham	Total		17	2	1	0	3	0	—		21	2
Manchester City	2023–24	Women's Super League	0	0	0	0	0	0	—		0	0
Manchester City	2024–25	Women's Super League	0	0	0	0	0	0	0	0	0	0
Manchester City	Total		0	0	0	0	0	0	0	0	0	0
Crystal Palace (loan)	2024–25	Women's Super League	3	0	0	0	3	0	—		6	0
Career total			20	2	1	0	6	0	0	0	27	2
