= Elise Hughes =

Welsh footballer (born 2001)

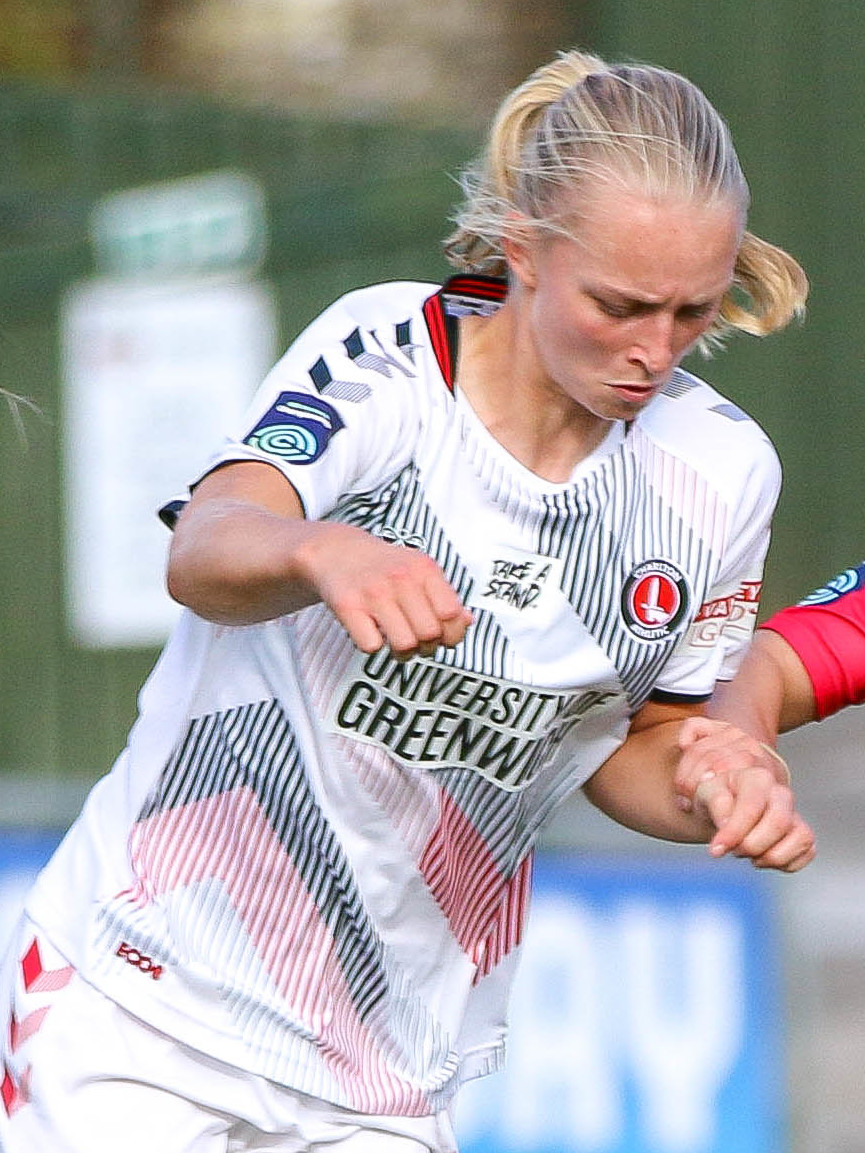
- Hughes playing for Charlton Athletic in October 2021

Personal information
- Full name: Elise Anna Hughes
- Date of birth: 15 April 2001 (age 25)
- Place of birth: Hawarden, Wales
- Position: Forward

Team information
- Current team: Sunderland
- Number: 9

Youth career
- Northop Hall Girls F.C.
- Everton

Senior career*
| Years | Team | Apps | (Gls) |
| 2017–2021 | Everton | 22 | (0) |
| 2020 | → Bristol City (loan) | 3 | (0) |
| 2020–2021 | → Blackburn Rovers (loan) | 19 | (5) |
| 2021–2022 | Charlton Athletic | 19 | (5) |
| 2022–2026 | Crystal Palace | 70 | (26) |
| 2026– | Sunderland | 8 | (5) |

International career^{‡}
- Wales U16
| 2017–2018 | Wales U17 | 8 | (3) |
| 2018 | Wales U19 | 4 | (1) |
| 2019– | Wales | 42 | (7) |
- * Club domestic league appearances and goals as of 15 November 2026 ‡ National team caps and goals as of 13 October 2026

Elise Anna Hughes (born 15 April 2001) is a Welsh footballer who plays as a forward for Women's Super League 2 club Sunderland and the Welsh national team.

== Early life ==
Hughes was born in Hawarden, Flintshire. Her grandfather David and father Peter were both footballers. The family supports Everton.

== Club career ==
Hughes came through Everton's Regional Talent Centre. In February 2018, Hughes made her first team debut for Everton in a 1–0 loss against Arsenal at 16 years old. Hughes scored her first professional goal in a derby win against Liverpool during the group stage of the FA WSL Cup.

On 4 January 2020, Hughes joined Bristol City on loan for the rest of the season. However, Hughes returned to Everton on 30 January to rehabilitate after suffering an ACL injury.

In the 2023–24, Hughes scored 16 goals in 21 games for Crystal Palace, winning the Championship Golden Boot as Palace won promotion to the WSL, however she suffered another ACL injury playing against Lewes in the penultimate game of the season.

Hughes is a UEFA Licence Holder and is involved in coaching her local club, Connah's Quay Nomads.

On 2 July 2026, Hughes was announced at Sunderland.

== International career ==
Hughes has made appearances for the Wales women's national football team at the under-16 and under-17 levels. She has been called up several times to the senior team, and made her senior debut 5 March 2018 in the Cyprus Cup against Switzerland. Elise now has 31 caps from Cymru and has scored 3 goals, the first of which was scored against Iceland in 2023 in the UEFA Women's Nations League. She suffered from an ACL which meant she was unable to play for many of the UEFA Women's Euro 2025 qualifiers.

In June 2025, Hughes was named in Wales' squad for UEFA Women's Euro 2025.

Hughes scored the equalising goal for Wales during added time in their 2–2 draw with the Czech Republic in their opening game of the 2027 FIFA Women's World Cup qualification campaign on 3 March 2026.

== Career statistics ==
=== Club ===
As of match played 15 November 2026

Appearances and goals by club, season and competition
| Club | Season | League | | | FA Cup | | League Cup | | Total | |
| Club | Season | Division | Apps | Goals | Apps | Goals | Apps | Goals | Apps | Goals |
|---|---|---|---|---|---|---|---|---|---|---|
| Everton | 2017–18 | Women's Super League | 6 | 0 | 0 | 0 | 0 | 0 | 6 | 0 |
| Everton | 2018–19 | Women's Super League | 12 | 0 | 1 | 0 | 1 | 1 | 14 | 1 |
| Everton | 2019–20 | Women's Super League | 4 | 0 | 0 | 0 | 4 | 1 | 8 | 1 |
| Everton | 2020–21 | Women's Super League | 0 | 0 | 0 | 0 | 0 | 0 | 0 | 0 |
| Everton | Total | | 22 | 0 | 1 | 0 | 5 | 2 | 28 | 2 |
| Bristol City (loan) | 2019–20 | Women's Super League | 3 | 0 | 0 | 0 | 0 | 0 | 3 | 0 |
| Blackburn Rovers (loan) | 2020–21 | Women's Championship | 19 | 5 | 2 | 1 | 2 | 1 | 23 | 7 |
| Charlton Athletic | 2021–22 | Women's Championship | 19 | 5 | 2 | 0 | 3 | 2 | 24 | 7 |
| Crystal Palace | 2022–23 | Women's Championship | 21 | 6 | 1 | 0 | 3 | 0 | 25 | 6 |
| Crystal Palace | 2023–24 | Women's Championship | 21 | 16 | 2 | 1 | 3 | 3 | 26 | 20 |
| Crystal Palace | 2024-25 | Women's Super League | 6 | 0 | 2 | 0 | 0 | 0 | 8 | 0 |
| Crystal Palace | 2025-26 | Women's Super League 2 | 22 | 4 | 1 | 0 | 4 | 0 | 27 | 4 |
| Crystal Palace | Total | | 70 | 26 | 6 | 1 | 10 | 3 | 86 | 30 |
| Sunderland | 2026–27 | Women's Super League 2 | 8 | 5 | 0 | 0 | 3 | 0 | 11 | 5 |
| Career total | | | 141 | 41 | 11 | 2 | 23 | 8 | 175 | 51 |

=== International ===
As of matches played 13 October 2026

Appearances and goals by national team and year
| National team | Year | Apps | Goals |
|---|---|---|---|
| Wales | 2018 | 3 | 0 |
| Wales | 2019 | 6 | 0 |
| Wales | 2020 | 1 | 0 |
| Wales | 2021 | 1 | 0 |
| Wales | 2022 | 3 | 0 |
| Wales | 2023 | 8 | 1 |
| Wales | 2024 | 3 | 2 |
| Wales | 2025 | 10 | 1 |
| Wales | 2026 | 7 | 3 |
| Total | | 42 | 7 |

Scores and results list Wales's goal tally first, score column indicates score after each Hughes goal.

List of international goals scored by Elise Hughes
| No. | Date | Venue | Opponent | Score | Result | Competition |
|---|---|---|---|---|---|---|
| 1 | 1 December 2023 | Cardiff City Stadium, Cardiff, Wales | Iceland | 1–2 | 1–2 | 2023–24 UEFA Women's Nations League |
| 2 | 8 April 2024 | Zahir Pajaziti Stadium, Podujeva, Kosovo | Kosovo | 5–0 | 6–0 | UEFA Women's Euro 2025 qualifying |
| 3 | 8 April 2024 | Zahir Pajaziti Stadium, Podujeva, Kosovo | Kosovo | 6–0 | 6–0 | UEFA Women's Euro 2025 qualifying |
| 4 | 28 October 2025 | Rodney Parade, Newport, Wales | Poland | 1–0 | 2–5 | Friendly |
| 5 | 3 March 2026 | Městský fotbalový stadion, Uherské Hradiště, Czech Republic | Czech Republic | 2–2 | 2–2 | 2027 FIFA Women's World Cup qualification |
| 6 | 14 April 2026 | Racecourse Ground, Wrexham, Wales | Albania | 2–0 | 4–0 | 2027 FIFA Women's World Cup qualification |
| 7 | 13 October 2026 | Parc y Scarlets, Llanelli, Wales | Albania | 2–0 | 3–0 | 2027 FIFA Women's World Cup UEFA play-offs |
