= My Cato =

Swedish footballer (born 2002)

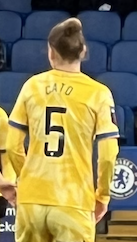

Personal information
- Full name: Ann My Cato
- Date of birth: 24 April 2002 (age 24)
- Place of birth: Norrköping, Sweden
- Height: 1.72 m (5 ft 8 in)
- Position: Midfielder

Team information
- Current team: Crystal Palace
- Number: 5

Youth career
- Eneby BK
- IFK Norrköping

Senior career*
Years	Team	Apps	(Gls)
2016–2019	IFK Norrköping		
2019–2020	Kvarnsvedens IK	24	(2)
2020–2021	Linköping	0	(0)
2021	→ IFK Norrköping (loan)	5	(0)
2021–2024	IFK Norrköping	64	(15)
2024–	Crystal Palace	21	(3)

International career^{‡}
2019–2020	Sweden U19	8	(0)
2023–	Sweden U23	13	(0)
2025–	Sweden	0	(0)
- * Club domestic league appearances and goals as of 26 June 2025 ‡ National team caps and goals as of 26 June 2025

Ann My Cato (Swedish: [myː ˈkɑ̂ːtʊ]; born 24 April 2002) is a Swedish professional footballer who plays a midfielder for Women's Super League club Crystal Palace. She has previously played for Swedish clubs Norrköping, Kvarnsveden IK, and Linköpings.

== Youth career ==
Born in Norrköping, Cato began her youth career at Swedish club Eneby BK, later joining Division 1 side IFK Norrköping aged 14, and making her senior debut in 2016.

== Club career ==
In 2019, Cato signed for Elitettan club Kvarnsveden IK for the 2020 season, prior to joining Linköpings FC in the Damallsvenskan for the 2021 season, in the top tier of women's football in Sweden.

Cato spent 8 months on loan with Norrköping in the second division for the 2021 season, scoring eight times in 24 appearances. The following season, she helped the team to gain promotion to the top tier as runners-up of the Elitettan. In 2023, she became captain of the team.

On 1 September 2024, Cato signed a three-year contract with Women's Super League club Crystal Palace ahead of the 2024–25 season. On 17 November, she scored her debut goal for Palace, opening the scoring in the 30th minute in a 3–2 defeat to Aston Villa.

== International career ==
On 2 October 2019, Cato featured as a substitute for the Sweden under-19 national team, as part of 2020 U19 Championship qualification, in a 14–0 victory over Armenia.

Cato received her first call-up to the Sweden national team in the summer of 2024. In November 2024, she returned to the under-23s, in order to face England on 2 December.

== Style of play ==
The Guardian described Cato has a "versatile player with strong defensive capabilities", while also supportive in attacking for a goal.

SheKicks called her a "creative central midfielder", and Cato has described herself as a box-to-box player.

== Career statistics ==
As of match played 14 December 2025

Appearances and goals by club, season and competition
Club	Season	League			National Cup (Note: Includes Svenska Cupen and Women's FA Cup)		League Cup (Note: Includes Women's League Cup)		Other		Total	
Club	Season	Division	Apps	Goals	Apps	Goals	Apps	Goals	Apps	Goals	Apps	Goals
Kvarnsvedens IK	2020	Elitettan	24	2	0	0	0	0	0	0	24	2
Linköping	2021	Damallsvenskan	0	0	0	0	0	0	0	0	0	0
IFK Norrköping (loan)	2021	Elitettan	5	0	0	0	0	0	0	0	5	0
IFK Norrköping	2022	Elitettan	24	8	1	0	0	0	0	0	25	8
IFK Norrköping	2023	Damallsvenskan	26	7	0	0	0	0	0	0	26	7
IFK Norrköping	2024	Damallsvenskan	14	0	0	0	0	0	0	0	14	0
IFK Norrköping	Total		64	15	1	0	0	0	0	0	65	15
Crystal Palace	2024–25	WSL	21	2	3	1	3	0	0	0	27	3
Crystal Palace	2025–26	WSL 2	6	0	1	1	2	0	0	0	9	1
Crystal Palace	Total		27	2	4	2	5	0	0	0	36	4
Career total			120	19	5	2	5	0	0	0	130	21

== Honours ==
IFK Norrköping

- Elitettan: 2022 runner up
