= Lily Woodham =

Welsh footballer (born 2000)

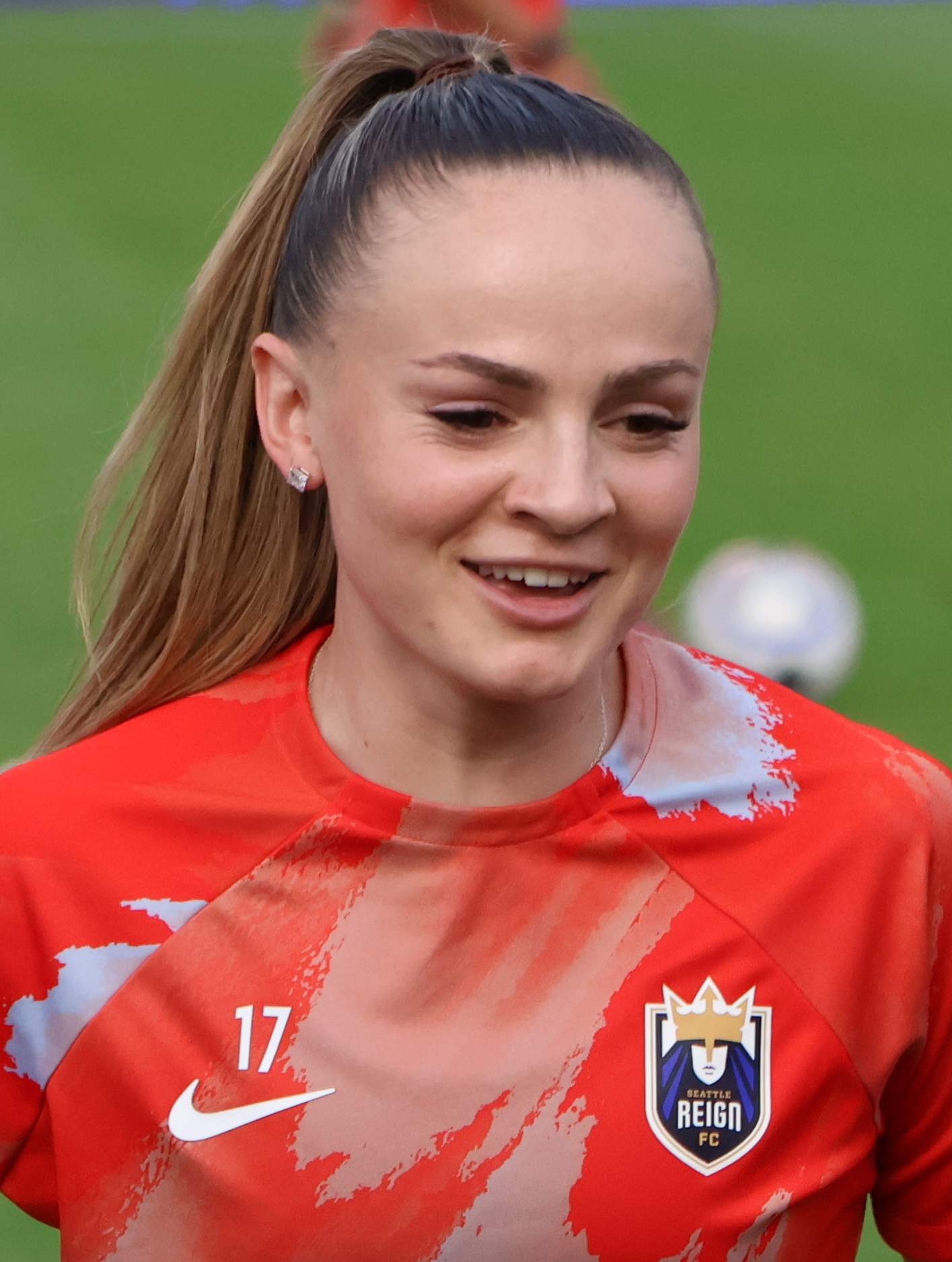
- Woodham with the Seattle Reign in 2024

Personal information
- Full name: Lily Susan Woodham
- Date of birth: 3 September 2000 (age 26)
- Place of birth: Cardiff, Wales
- Height: 1.61 m (5 ft 3 in)
- Positions: Left-back; left wing-back

Team information
- Current team: Liverpool
- Number: 16

Senior career*
Years	Team	Apps	(Gls)
2017–2018	Bristol City	7	(0)
2018–2024	Reading	65	(0)
2019	→ Charlton Athletic (loan)	7	(1)
2024–2025	Seattle Reign	8	(0)
2024–2025	→ Crystal Palace (loan)	20	(0)
2025–	Liverpool	12	(0)

International career^{‡}
2016	Wales U17	3	(1)
2018–2020	Wales U19	6	(0)
2020–	Wales	52	(5)
- * Club domestic league appearances and goals as of 09:06, 4 May 2026 (UTC) ‡ National team caps and goals as of 15:34, 18 October 2026 (UTC)

Lily Susan Woodham (/ˈwʊdəm/ WUUD-əm; born 3 September 2000) is a Welsh professional footballer who plays as a left-back or left wing-back for Women's Super League club Liverpool and the Wales national team. She has previously played for Bristol City, Reading, Charlton Athletic, Seattle Reign and Crystal Palace.

== Club career ==
On 31 July 2019, Woodham and Charlie Estcourt joined Charlton Athletic on loan for the season.

On 7 July 2022, Reading confirmed that Woodham had signed a new two-year contract with the club, and at the start of the 2023–24 season, Woodham became the club captain.

On 31 January 2024, Woodham signed a two-year contract with National Women's Soccer League side Seattle Reign for an undisclosed fee.

On 13 September 2024, she joined Women's Super League club Crystal Palace on loan until January 2025 for the 2024–25 season. In November 2024, Woodham stated she believed Palace would be able to remain in the top tier of women's football. The loan was extended until the end of the 2024–25 season on 29 January 2025.

On 25 July 2025, Woodham and Seattle Reign FC mutually agreed to terminate her contract. Three days later, on 28 July, it was announced that Woodham had signed for Liverpool.

== International career ==
Woodham made her debut for Cymru’s senior team in 2020 against the Faroe Islands in a 4-0 victory in the 2022 UEFA Women’s Euro qualifiers, in a game where she also scored her first Cymru goal.

Woodham earned three caps for Cymru’s WU17s in 2016 and six caps for Cymru’s WU19s during 2018-2020.

Woodham currently has 39 caps for Cymru, scoring three goals, including a strike against the Republic of Ireland in Cardiff to help Cymru secure qualification for the UEFA Women’s Euro 2025 in Switzerland.

== Personal life ==
Woodham’s hobbies outside of football include music, fashion and drinking coffee. She also supports child protection charities. Family is one of the most important things to her.

As of December 2025, Woodham is in a relationship with Rebecca Fenney, who took part in the tenth series of Married at First Sight.

== Career statistics ==
=== Club ===
As of match played 27 September 2026

Appearances and goals by club, season and competition
Club	Season	League			National Cup (Note: Includes the FA Women's Cup)		League Cup (Note: Includes the FA Women's League Cup, FA Women's National League Cup and NWSL x Liga MX Femenil Summer Cup)		Total	
Club	Season	Division	Apps	Goals	Apps	Goals	Apps	Goals	Apps	Goals
Bristol City	2017	Women's Super League	5	0	0	0	0	0	5	0
Bristol City	2017–18	Women's Super League	2	0	0	0	1	0	3	0
Bristol City	Total		7	0	0	0	1	0	8	0
Reading	2018–19	Women's Super League	4	0	0	0	2	0	6	0
Reading	2019–20	Women's Super League	0	0	0	0	0	0	0	0
Reading	2020–21	Women's Super League	12	0	1	0	2	0	15	0
Reading	2021–22	Women's Super League	21	0	2	0	3	0	26	0
Reading	2022–23	Women's Super League	16	0	3	0	2	0	21	0
Reading	2023–24	Women's Championship	12	0	1	0	3	0	16	0
Reading	Total		65	0	7	0	12	0	84	0
Charlton Athletic (loan)	2019–20	Women's Championship	7	1	1	0	0	0	8	1
Seattle Reign	2024	National Women's Soccer League	8	0	—		1	0	9	0
Crystal Palace (loan)	2024–25	Women's Super League	20	0	3	0	1	0	24	0
Liverpool	2025–26	Women's Super League	12	0	2	0	3	0	17	0
Liverpool	2026–27	Women's Super League	0	0	0	0	1	0	1	0
Liverpool	Total		12	0	2	0	4	0	18	0
Career Total			119	1	13	0	19	0	151	1

=== International ===
As of matches played 13 October 2026

Appearances and goals by national team and year
National team	Year	Apps	Goals
Wales	2020	3	1
Wales	2021	2	0
Wales	2022	10	0
Wales	2023	7	0
Wales	2024	11	2
Wales	2025	11	4
Wales	2026	8	1
Total		52	4

Scores and results list Wales's goal tally first, score column indicates score after each Woodham goal.

List of international goals scored by Lily Woodham
No.	Date	Venue	Opponent	Score	Result	Competition
1	22 October 2020	Rodney Parade, Newport, Wales	Faroe Islands	4–0	4–0	UEFA Women's Euro 2022 qualifying
2	27 February 2024	Tallaght Stadium, Tallaght, Dublin, Ireland	Republic of Ireland	2–0	2–0	Friendly
3	29 November 2024	Cardiff City Stadium, Cardiff, Wales	Republic of Ireland	1–0	1–1	UEFA Women's Euro 2025 qualifying play-offs
4	2 December 2025	Estadio Municipal de Chapín, Jerez de la Frontera, Spain	Switzerland	3–1	3–2	Friendly
5	9 June 2026	Cardiff City Stadium, Cardiff, Wales	Czech Republic	1–1	3–1	2027 FIFA Women's World Cup qualification
