= Annabel Blanchard =

English footballer (born 2001)

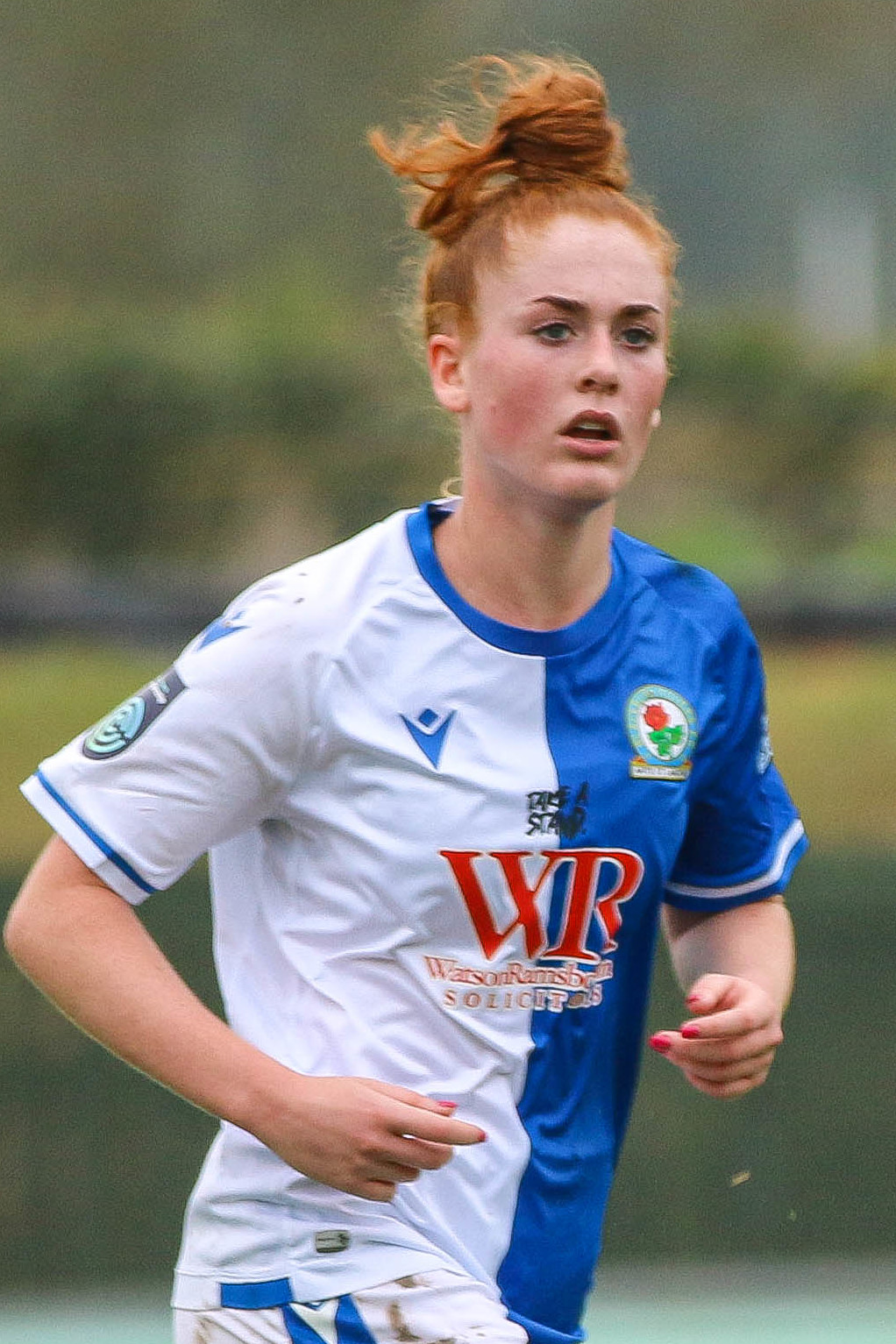
- Blanchard with Blackburn Rovers in 2021

Personal information
- Full name: Annabel Lucy Blanchard
- Date of birth: 7 May 2001 (age 25)
- Place of birth: Liverpool, England
- Positions: Forward; attacking midfielder

Team information
- Current team: Crystal Palace
- Number: 17

Youth career
- Liverpool

Senior career*
Years	Team	Apps	(Gls)
2017–2019	Liverpool	2	(0)
2019–2021	Leicester City	20	(6)
2021–2022	Blackburn Rovers	24	(4)
2022–	Crystal Palace	101	(28)

International career^{‡}
2017–2018	England U17	8	(5)
2018	England U18	5	(3)
2019–2020	England U19	6	(3)
- * Club domestic league appearances and goals as of 06:47, 28 October 2024 (UTC) ‡ National team caps and goals as of 17:20, 19 January 2020 (UTC)

Annabel Lucy Blanchard (born 7 May 2001) is an English professional footballer who plays as an attacking midfielder for Women's Super League club Crystal Palace. She previously played for Liverpool, Leicester City, and Blackburn Rovers, and has represented England at international youth level. She is known for her outstanding technical ability and complete two footedness.

== Club career ==
=== Liverpool ===
Blanchard made her professional debut on 24 April 2018 against Arsenal.

=== Leicester ===
Blanchard joined Leicester City ahead of the 2019–20 season. She made her league debut against Durham on 18 August 2019. Blanchard scored her first league goal against Crystal Palace on 19 January 2020, scoring in the 15th minute.

=== Blackburn Rovers ===
On 21 January 2021, Blanchard joined Women's Championship club Blackburn Rovers. She made her league debut against London City Lionesses on 24 January 2021. Blanchard scored her first league goal against Watford on 12 September 2021, scoring in the 80th minute.

=== Crystal Palace ===
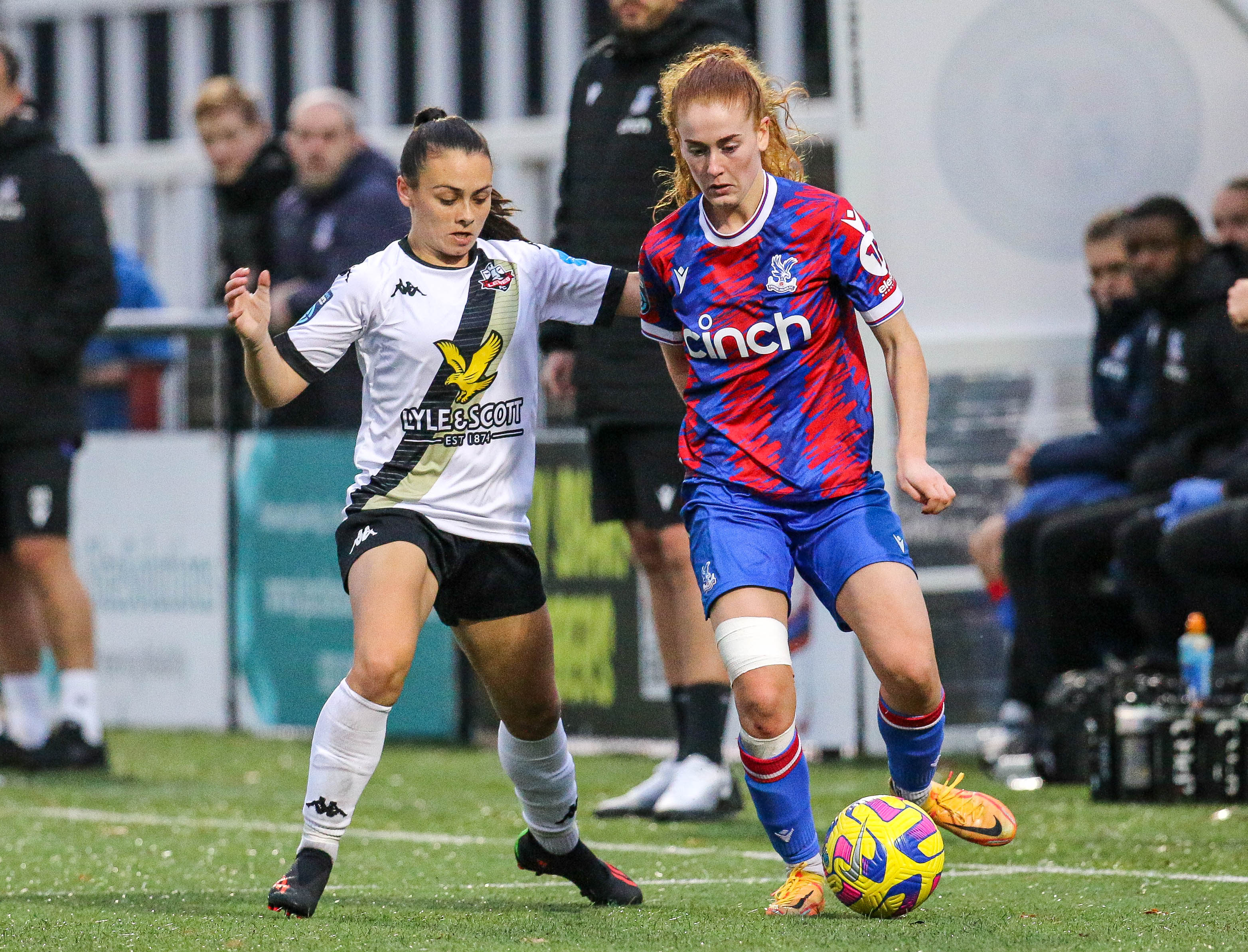
Blanchard playing for Crystal Palace against Lewes in 2022

Blanchard made her league debut against London City Lionesses on 21 August 2022. She scored her first league goal against Coventry United on 27 August 2022 in the 64th minute.

In the 2023–24 season, Blanchard won the Women's Championship Player of the Month award, the Women’s Championship Goal of the Month award for September, and was voted Crystal Palace Women’s Player of the Month for October.

On 16 January 2024, it was announced that Blanchard had signed a new deal until 2025. She was awarded the Crystal Palace Women’s Player of the Month for April 2024.

On 6 October 2024, Blanchard scored twice against Leicester City 2–0 victory, gaining newly promoted Crystal Palace their first ever goals and win in the Women's Super League for the 2024–25 season. Her first goal was subsequently nominated for the WSL Goal of the Month award.

On 20 October 2024, after her performance in a 1–1 draw against Liverpool, BBC Sport declared that Blanchard was "the source of almost everything dangerous that comes from the Palace attack".

In August 2025 it was announced that Blanchard had signed a new 2 year contract with Crystal Palace keeping her at the club until 2027.

== International career ==
Blanchard represented England throughout the U14 to U19 levels, including scoring twice in three appearances at the 2018 UEFA Women's Under-17 Championship in Lithuania.

In October 2024, former England striker Ian Wright appealed for Sarina Wiegman to add Blanchard to the England squad.

== Style of play ==
Blanchard has been credited with impressive awareness, ability to hold up the ball at the right time, and knowing when to play in other players.

== Career statistics ==
=== Club ===
As of match played 5 May 2026.

Appearances and goals by club, season and competition
Club	Season	League			FA Cup		League Cup		Total	
Club	Season	Division	Apps	Goals	Apps	Goals	Apps	Goals	Apps	Goals
Liverpool	2017–18	Women's Super League	1	0	0	0	0	0	1	0
Liverpool	2018–19	Women's Super League	1	0	0	0	0	0	1	0
Liverpool	Total		2	0	0	0	0	0	2	0
Leicester City	2019–20	Women's Championship	14	2	1	0	3	0	18	2
Leicester City	2020–21	Women's Championship	6	0	0	0	2	0	8	0
Leicester City	Total		20	2	1	0	5	0	26	2
Blackburn Rovers	2020–21	Women's Championship	2	0	0	0	0	0	2	0
Blackburn Rovers	2021–22	Women's Championship	22	4	1	1	4	0	27	5
Blackburn Rovers	Total		24	4	1	1	4	0	29	5
Crystal Palace F.C.	2022–23	Women's Championship	22	4	1	0	3	0	26	4
Crystal Palace F.C.	2023–24	Women's Championship	19	11	2	0	1	0	22	11
Crystal Palace F.C.	2024–25	Women's Super League	18	4	3	0	3	0	24	4
Crystal Palace F.C.	2025–26	Women's Super League 2	22	6	2	0	4	1	28	7
Crystal Palace F.C.	Total		81	25	8	0	11	1	100	26
Career total			127	31	10	1	20	1	157	33
