= 2024–25 Women's Super League =

Women's Super League
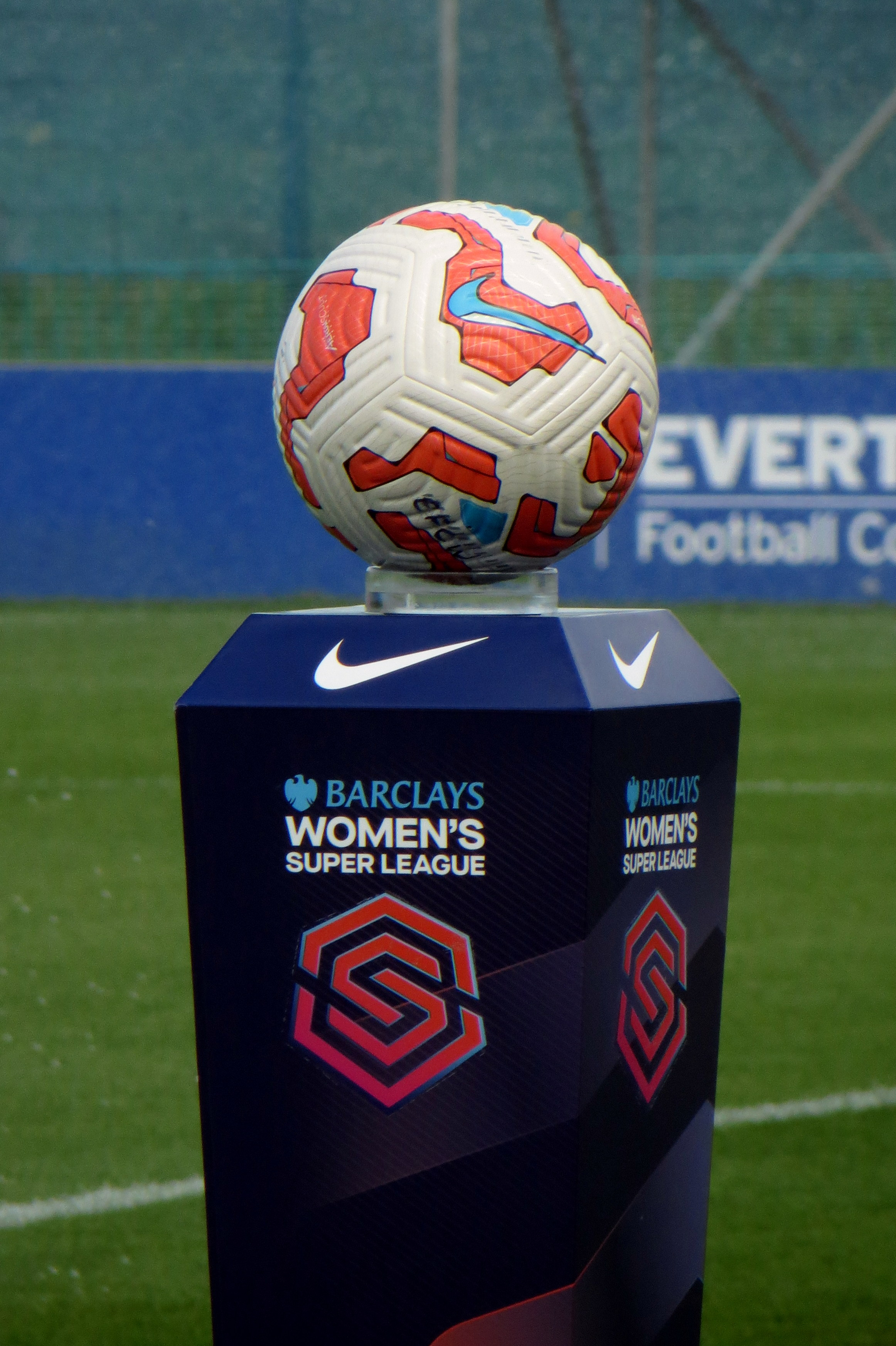
- Season: 2024–25
- Dates: 20 September 2024 – 10 May 2025
- Champions: Chelsea; 8th title
- Relegated: Crystal Palace
- Champions League: Chelsea; Arsenal; Manchester United
- Matches: 132
- Goals: 424 (3.21 per match)
- Top goalscorer: Alessia Russo; Khadija Shaw (12 goals)
- Best goalkeeper: Hannah Hampton; Phallon Tullis-Joyce (13 clean sheets)
- Biggest home win: Arsenal 5–0 Brighton & Hove Albion (8 November 2024); Arsenal 5–0 Crystal Palace (19 January 2025); Arsenal 5–0 Tottenham Hotspur (16 February 2025)
- Biggest away win: Crystal Palace 0–7 Chelsea (27 September 2024)
- Highest scoring: Crystal Palace 1–7 West Ham United (27 April 2025)
- Longest winning run: 9 games Chelsea
- Longest unbeaten run: 22 games Chelsea
- Longest winless run: 12 games Crystal Palace
- Longest losing run: 6 games Aston Villa
- Highest attendance: 56,784; Arsenal 5–0 Tottenham Hotspur (16 February 2025)
- Lowest attendance: 502; Crystal Palace 1–1 Everton (10 November 2024)

The 2024–25 Women's Super League season (also known as the Barclays Women's Super League for sponsorship reasons) was the 14th season of the Women's Super League (WSL) since it was formed in 2010. It was the sixth season after the rebranding of the four highest levels in English women's football.

Chelsea were the defending champions, having won their fifth consecutive and seventh overall title in the previous season.

After Arsenal's 2–5 defeat to Aston Villa and Chelsea's 1–0 victory over Manchester United, Chelsea were confirmed to have won their sixth consecutive and eighth overall title. At the end of the season, Chelsea also became the first team to finish a 22-game WSL season unbeaten.

Crystal Palace, who in the previous season had been promoted to the WSL for the first time in their history, were relegated back to the Women's Championship after just one season in the top flight on 27 April 2025, after a 1–7 defeat at home to West Ham United.

Ahead of the season, the WSL announced a change to the way games were broadcast domestically in the UK. The FA Player streaming service was replaced by the league's YouTube channel for the live broadcast of all 66 league matches not televised by BBC or Sky Sports. The transition followed the creation and subsequent takeover of the running of the league by the Women's Professional Leagues Limited (initially called 'NewCo' on a temporary basis), an independent, club-owned entity, which replaced The Football Association after recommendations from a government-backed review into the women's game in 2023.

== Teams ==
Locations of the 2024–25 WSL teams outside of London
Locations of the 2024–25 WSL teams in London

Twelve teams contested the 2024–25 Women's Super League season. Crystal Palace secured promotion as 2023–24 Women's Championship champions on 28 April 2024, marking their first appearance in the WSL. They replaced Bristol City, who were relegated one season after their return to the WSL since being promoted from the Women's Championship the season prior.

Team	Location	Ground	Capacity	2023–24 season
Arsenal	London (Holloway)	Emirates Stadium (Note: Three matches played at Meadow Park.)	60,704	3rd
Aston Villa	Birmingham (Aston)	Villa Park	42,640	7th
Brighton & Hove Albion	Crawley	Broadfield Stadium (Note: Three matches played at Falmer Stadium.)	6,134	9th
Chelsea	London (Kingston upon Thames)	Kingsmeadow (Note: Three matches played at Stamford Bridge.)	4,850	1st
Crystal Palace	London (Sutton)	Gander Green Lane (Note: Four matches played at Selhurst Park.)	5,013	WC, 1st
Everton	Liverpool (Walton)	Walton Hall Park (Note: Two matches played at Goodison Park.)	2,200	8th
Leicester City	Leicester	King Power Stadium	32,212	10th
Liverpool	St Helens	Totally Wicked Stadium (Note: Three matches played at Anfield.)	18,000	4th
Manchester City	Manchester (Bradford)	Academy Stadium (Note: Three matches played at City of Manchester Stadium.)	7,000	2nd
Manchester United	Leigh	Leigh Sports Village (Note: Three matches played at Old Trafford.)	12,000	5th
Tottenham Hotspur	London (Leyton)	Brisbane Road (Note: Three matches played at Tottenham Hotspur Stadium.)	9,271	6th
West Ham United	London (Dagenham)	Victoria Road	6,078	11th

=== Stadium changes ===
Having spent the previous six seasons at Prenton Park, Liverpool relocated to Totally Wicked Stadium, home of St Helens R.F.C., ahead of the 2024–25 season. Arsenal announced Emirates Stadium would become the team's primary ground ahead of the 2024–25 season, hosting eight of the team's home league games. Meadow Park, the ground the team has groundshared since the 1990s, will retain the three remaining fixtures. After four seasons at Walsall's Bescot Stadium following promotion in 2020, Aston Villa announced Villa Park would become the team's home stadium for league matches ahead of the 2024–25 season.

=== Personnel and kits ===
Team	Manager	Captain	Kit manufacturer	Shirt sponsor	Shirt sponsor (sleeve)	Shirt sponsor (back)	Shorts sponsor
Arsenal	(Netherlands) Renée Slegers	(Scotland) Kim Little	Adidas	Fly Emirates	Visit Rwanda	None	None
Aston Villa	(Spain) Natalia Arroyo	(Scotland) Rachel Corsie	Adidas	Betano	Trade Nation	None	None
Brighton & Hove Albion	(Australia) Dario Vidošić	(Spain) Vicky Losada	Nike	American Express	Experience Kissimmee	None	None
Chelsea	(France) Sonia Bompastor	(England) Millie Bright	Nike	None	BingX	None	Singer Capital Markets
Crystal Palace	(Norway) Leif Gunnar Smerud	(England) Aimee Everett	Macron	TEN	Kaiyun Sports	None	None
Everton	(Denmark) Brian Sørensen	(England) Megan Finnigan	Castore	Stake.com	KICK	Christopher Ward	None
Leicester City	(France) Amandine Miquel	(Belgium) Janice Cayman	Adidas	King Power	Bia Saigon	Sekonda	None
Liverpool	(England) Amber Whiteley (interim)	(Republic of Ireland) Niamh Fahey	Nike	Standard Chartered	Expedia	None	None
Manchester City	(England) Nick Cushing (interim)	(England) Alex Greenwood	Puma	Etihad Airways	OKX	Nissan	Joie
Manchester United	(England) Marc Skinner	(England) Maya Le Tissier	Adidas	Snapdragon	DXC Technology	None	None
Tottenham Hotspur	(Sweden) Robert Vilahamn	Bethany England	Nike	AIA	Cinch	Tumi	None
West Ham United	(England) Rehanne Skinner	(Australia) Katrina Gorry	Umbro	Betway	JD Sports	ZO Skin Health	Maldon Accident Repair Centre

=== Managerial changes ===
Team	Outgoing manager	Manner of departure	Date of vacancy	Position in table	Incoming manager	Date of appointment
Chelsea	(England) Emma Hayes	Signed by the United States	18 May 2024	Pre season	(France) Sonia Bompastor	29 May 2024
Aston Villa	(England) Carla Ward	Resigned	18 May 2024	Pre season	(Netherlands) Robert de Pauw	29 June 2024
Brighton & Hove Albion	(England) Mikey Harris	End of interim period	18 May 2024	Pre season	(Australia) Dario Vidošić	10 July 2024
Leicester City	(England) Jennifer Foster	End of interim period	18 May 2024	Pre season	(France) Amandine Miquel	15 July 2024
Arsenal	(Sweden) Jonas Eidevall	Resigned	15 October 2024	6th	(Netherlands) Renée Slegers (Note: Slegers was initially appointed as an interim manager, but the move was made permanent on 17 January 2025.)	15 October 2024
Aston Villa	(Netherlands) Robert de Pauw	Sacked	11 December 2024	9th	(Bermuda) Shaun Goater (interim)	11 December 2024
Aston Villa	(Bermuda) Shaun Goater	End of interim period	22 January 2025	8th	(Spain) Natalia Arroyo	22 January 2025
Liverpool	(England) Matt Beard	Sacked	27 February 2025	7th	(England) Amber Whiteley (interim)	27 February 2025
Crystal Palace	(England) Laura Kaminski	Sacked	28 February 2025	12th	(Norway) Leif Gunnar Smerud	1 March 2025
Manchester City	(Wales) Gareth Taylor	Sacked	10 March 2025	4th	(England) Nick Cushing (interim)	10 March 2025

== League table ==
Pos	Team	Pld	W	D	L	GF	GA	GD	Pts	Qualification or relegation
1	Chelsea (C)	22	19	3	0	56	13	+43	60	Qualification for the Champions League league stage (Note: Arsenal qualified for the Champions League league phase as the 2024–25 UEFA Women's Champions League winners.)
2	Arsenal	22	15	3	4	62	26	+36	48	Qualification for the Champions League league stage
3	Manchester United	22	13	5	4	41	16	+25	44	Qualification for the Champions League second qualifying round
4	Manchester City	22	13	4	5	49	28	+21	43	
5	Brighton & Hove Albion	22	8	4	10	35	41	−6	28	
6	Aston Villa	22	7	4	11	32	44	−12	25	
7	Liverpool	22	7	4	11	22	37	−15	25	
8	Everton	22	6	6	10	24	32	−8	24	
9	West Ham United	22	6	5	11	36	41	−5	23	
10	Leicester City	22	5	5	12	21	37	−16	20	
11	Tottenham Hotspur	22	5	5	12	26	44	−18	20	
12	Crystal Palace (R)	22	2	4	16	20	65	−45	10	Relegation to the WSL2

Source: The Football Association
Rules for classification: 1) Points; 2) Goal difference; 3) Number of goals scored.
(C) Champions; (R) Relegated

== Results ==
Home \ Away	ARS	AVL	BHA	CHE	CRY	EVE	LEI	LIV	MCI	MUN	TOT	WHU
Arsenal		4–0	5–0	1–2	5–0	0–0	5–1	4–0	2–2	4–3	5–0	4–3
Aston Villa	5–2		3–1	0–1	3–2	0–2	0–0	1–2	2–4	0–4	2–2	3–1
Brighton & Hove Albion	4–2	4–2		2–2	1–1	4–0	1–0	1–2	1–2	1–1	1–1	3–2
Chelsea	1–0	1–0	4–2		4–0	2–1	3–1	1–0	2–0	1–0	5–2	2–2
Crystal Palace	0–4	3–1	0–1	0–7		1–1	2–2	0–1	0–3	0–1	2–3	1–7
Everton	1–3	1–1	2–3	0–5	3–0		4–1	1–0	2–1	0–1	1–1	1–1
Leicester City	0–1	3–0	3–2	1–1	0–2	1–0		2–1	0–1	0–2	1–1	4–2
Liverpool	0–1	1–2	2–1	0–3	1–1	0–2	1–1		1–2	3–1	2–2	1–0
Manchester City	3–4	2–1	1–0	1–2	5–2	1–1	4–0	4–0		2–4	4–0	2–0
Manchester United	1–1	0–0	3–0	0–1	3–1	2–0	2–0	4–0	2–2		3–0	3–0
Tottenham Hotspur	0–3	2–3	0–1	0–1	4–0	2–1	1–0	2–3	1–2	0–1		2–1
West Ham United	0–2	2–3	3–1	0–5	5–2	2–0	1–0	1–1	1–1	0–0	2–0	

Source: Women's Super League Results and Fixtures
Legend: Blue = home team win; Yellow = draw; Red = away team win.

== Season statistics ==
=== Top scorers ===
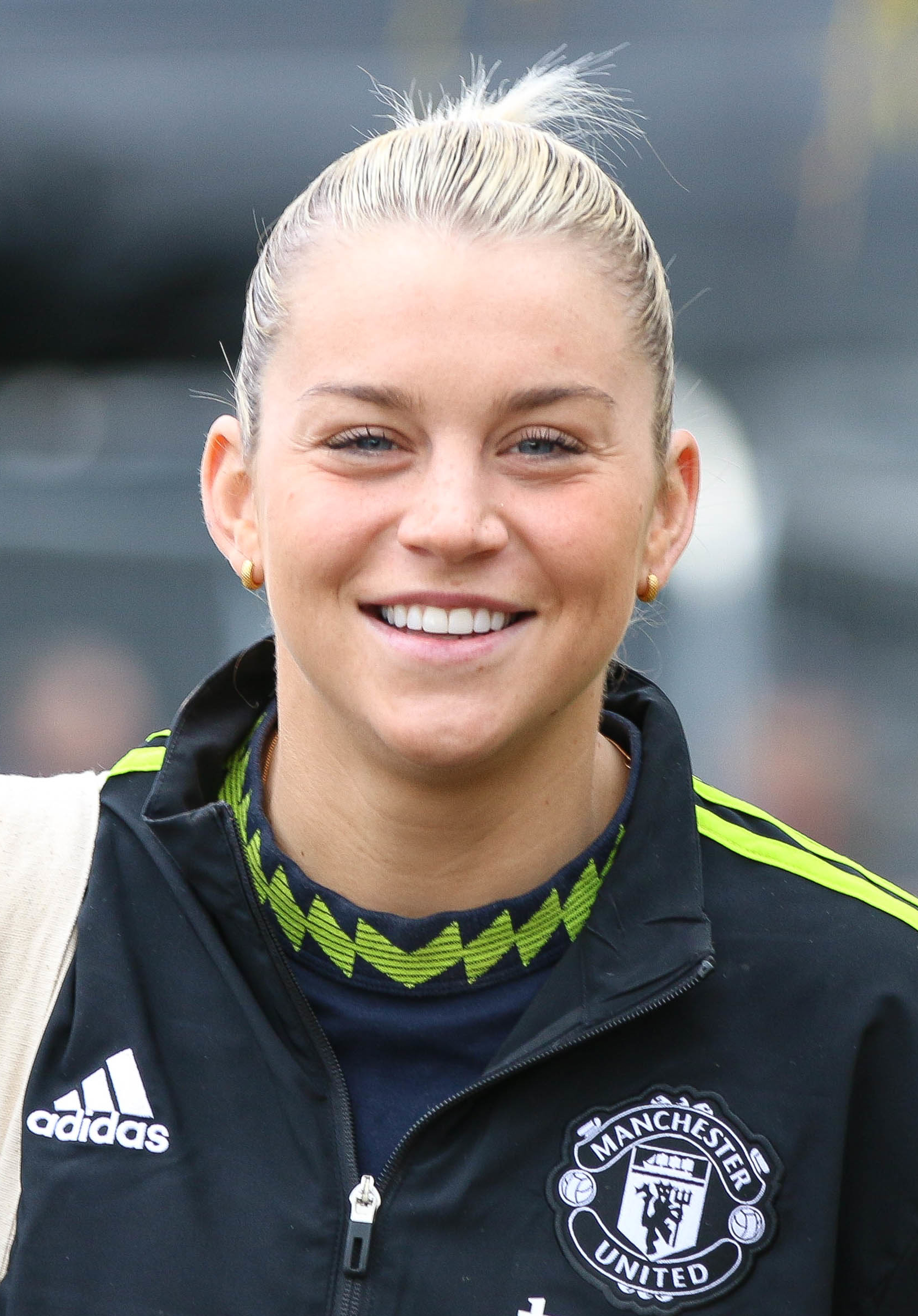
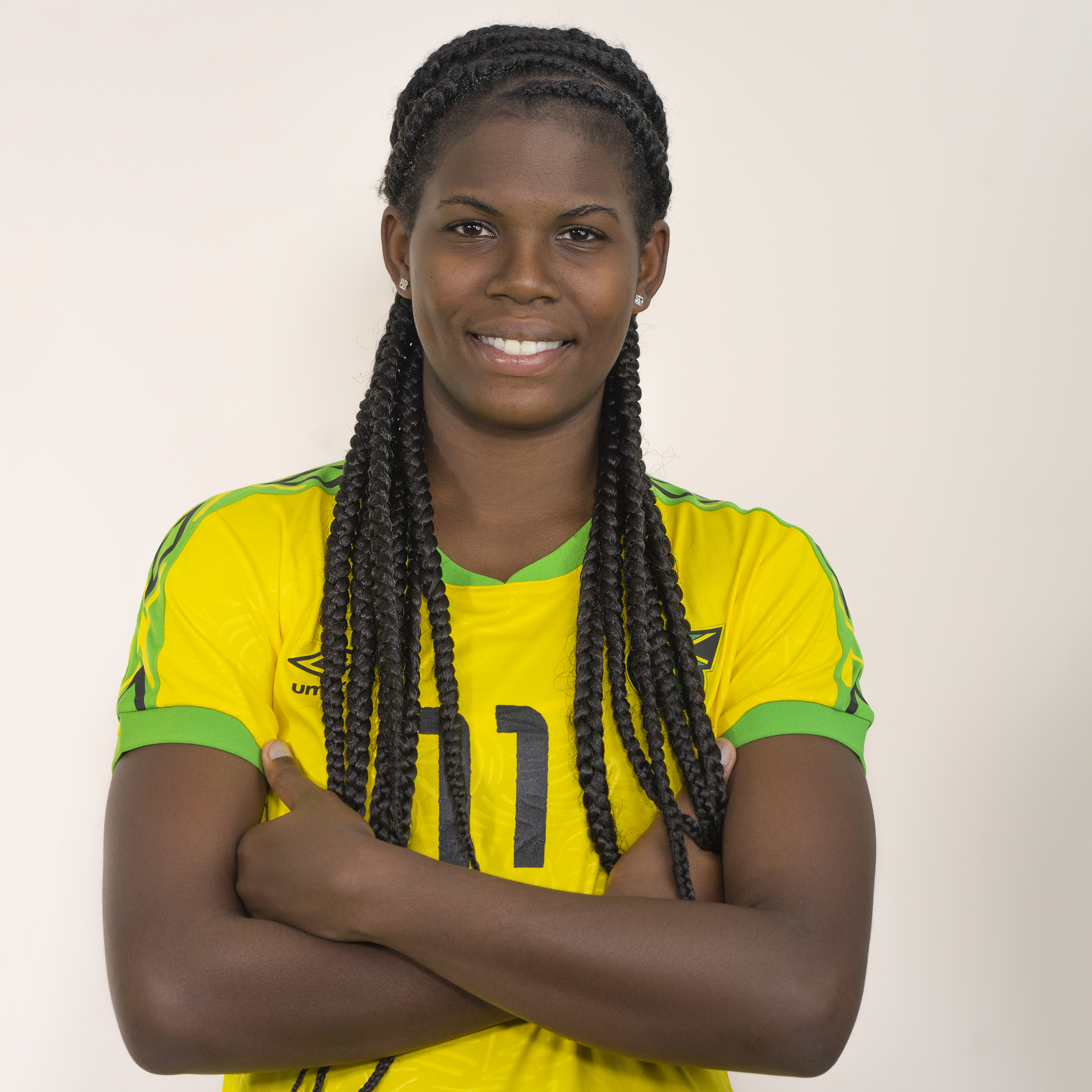
Arsenal's Alessia Russo (left) and Manchester City's Khadija Shaw (right) jointly won the Golden Boot, with 12 goals each.

Rank	Player	Club	Goals
1	(England) Alessia Russo	Arsenal	12
1	(Jamaica) Khadija Shaw	Manchester City	12
3	(Germany) Shekiera Martinez	West Ham United	10
3	(Norway) Elisabeth Terland	Manchester United	10
5	(France) Viviane Asseyi	West Ham United	9
5	(England) Aggie Beever-Jones	Chelsea	9
5	(Spain) Mariona Caldentey	Arsenal	9
8	(England) Grace Clinton	Manchester United	8
8	(England) Rachel Daly	Aston Villa	8
8	Bethany England	Tottenham Hotspur	8
8	(Norway) Guro Reiten	Chelsea	8

=== Clean sheets ===
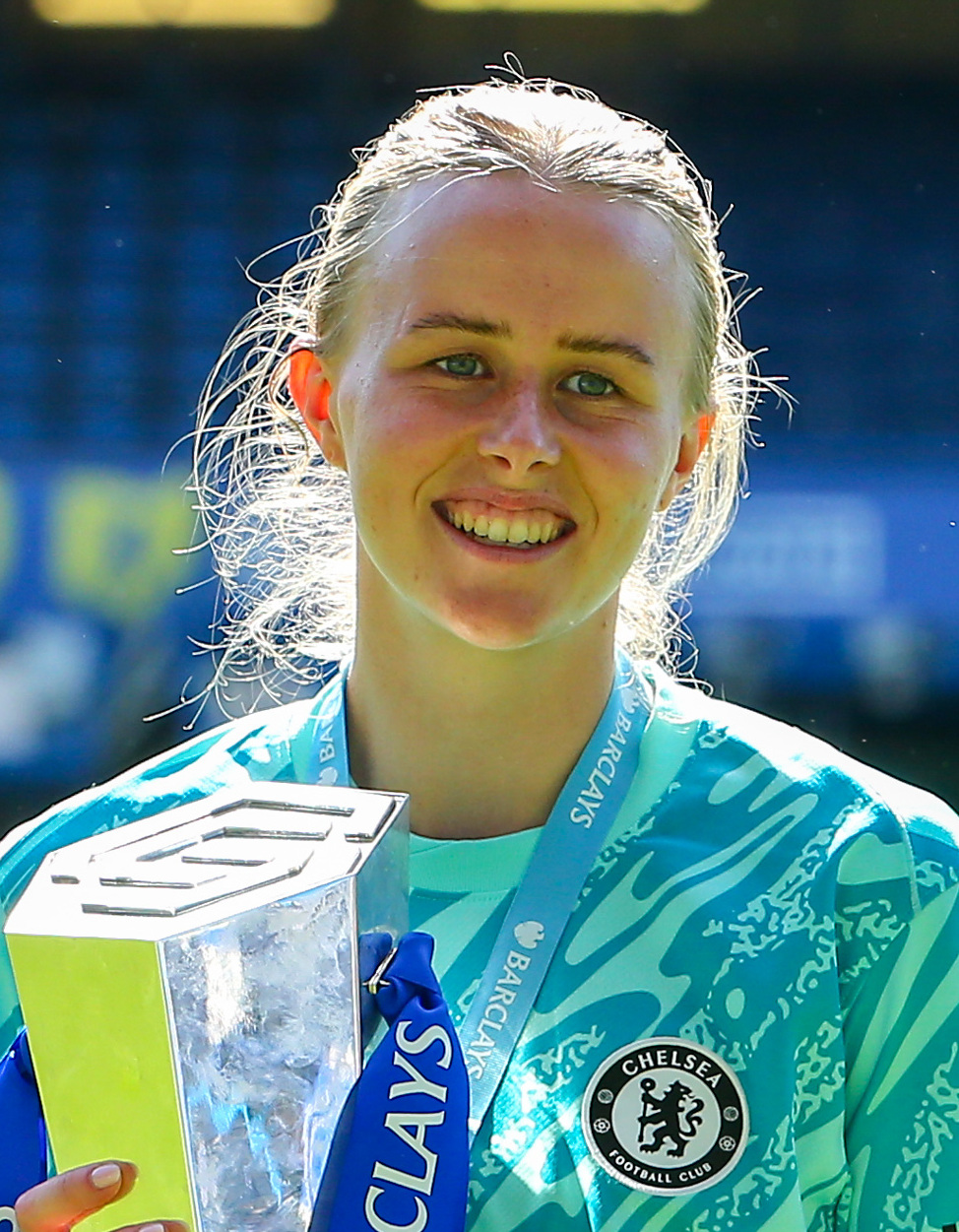
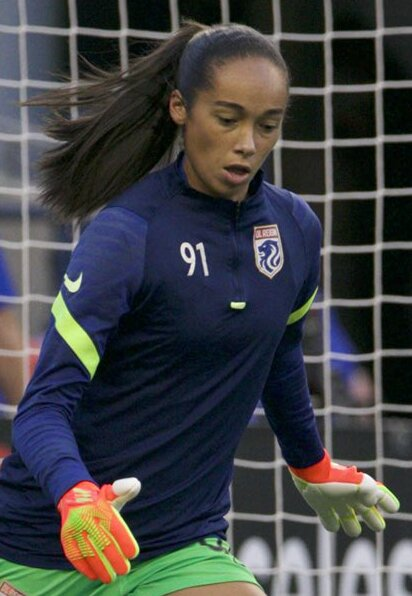
Chelsea's Hannah Hampton (left) and Manchester United's Phallon Tullis-Joyce (right) jointly won the Golden Glove, with 13 clean sheets each.

Rank	Player	Club	Clean sheets
1	(England) Hannah Hampton	Chelsea	13
1	(United States) Phallon Tullis-Joyce	Manchester United	13
3	(Netherlands) Daphne van Domselaar	Arsenal	10
4	(Republic of Ireland) Courtney Brosnan	Everton	5
5	(England) Khiara Keating	Manchester City	4
5	(Poland) Kinga Szemik	West Ham United	4
7	(England) Sophie Baggaley	Brighton & Hove Albion	3
7	(Germany) Janina Leitzig	Leicester City	3
7	(Japan) Ayaka Yamashita	Manchester City	3
10	(Canada) Sabrina D'Angelo	Aston Villa	2

=== Hat-tricks ===
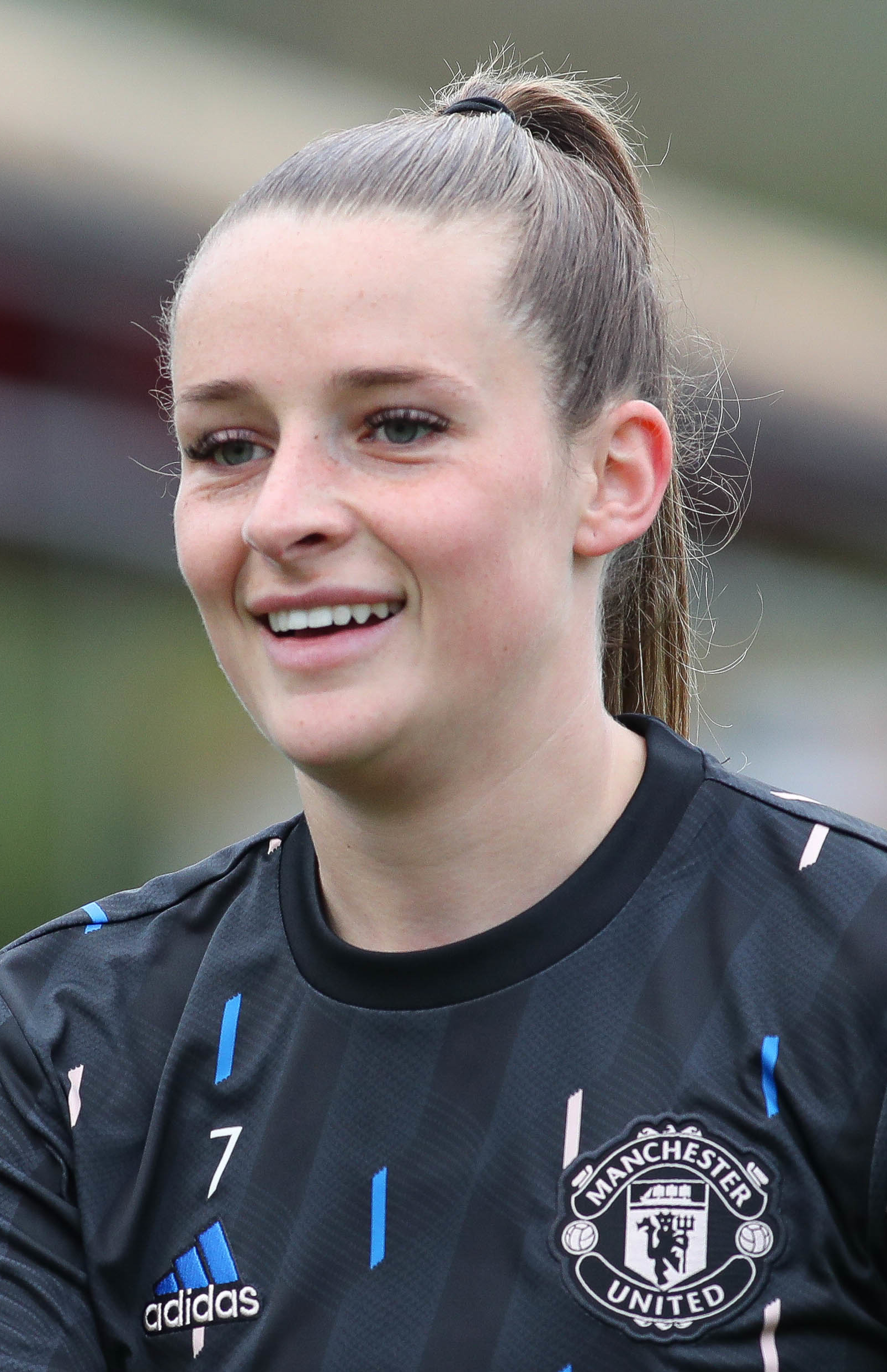
Ella Toone became the first player to score a hat-trick in the Manchester derby on 19 January 2025, when Manchester United beat Manchester City 4–2 at the City of Manchester Stadium.

Player	For	Against	Result	Date	Ref.
(Japan) Kiko Seike	Brighton & Hove Albion	Everton	4–0 (H)	21 September 2024	
(Jamaica) Khadija Shaw	Manchester City	Tottenham Hotspur	4–0 (H)	8 November 2024	
(England) Ella Toone	Manchester United	Manchester City	4–2 (A)	19 January 2025	
(Germany) Shekiera Martinez^{4}	West Ham United	Crystal Palace	7–1 (A)	27 April 2025	

(H) – Home; (A) – Away
^{4} – Player scored four goals.

=== Discipline ===
	Most yellow cards	Total	Most red cards	Total	Ref.
Player	(Denmark) Sara Holmgaard (Everton) (Australia) Clare Hunt (Tottenham Hotspur) (England) Ruby Mace (Leicester City)	7	(England) Brooke Aspin (Crystal Palace) (Denmark) Sara Holmgaard (Everton) (Republic of Ireland) Aoife Mannion (Manchester United) (Republic of Ireland) Katie McCabe (Arsenal) (England) Poppy Pattinson (Brighton & Hove Albion) (Jamaica) Allyson Swaby (Crystal Palace) (England) Maisie Symonds (Brighton & Hove Albion) (Spain) Paula Tomás (Aston Villa)	1	
Club	Brighton & Hove Albion	41	Brighton & Hove Albion; Crystal Palace	2	

== Awards ==
=== Monthly awards ===
Month	Manager of the Month		Player of the Month		Goal of the Month		Ref.
Month	Manager	Club	Player	Club	Player	Club	Ref.
September	(France) Sonia Bompastor	Chelsea	(Japan) Kiko Seike	Brighton & Hove Albion	(England) Jess Park (vs. Arsenal)	Manchester City	
October	(Australia) Dario Vidošić	Brighton & Hove Albion	(England) Lauren Hemp	Manchester City	(Sweden) Johanna Rytting Kaneryd (vs. Tottenham Hotspur)	Chelsea	
November	(France) Sonia Bompastor	Chelsea	(Norway) Guro Reiten	Chelsea	(Norway) Frida Maanum (vs. Brighton & Hove Albion)	Arsenal	
December	(Netherlands) Renée Slegers	Arsenal	(England) Alessia Russo	Arsenal	(England) Alessia Russo (vs. Aston Villa)	Arsenal	
January	(France) Sonia Bompastor	Chelsea	(England) Ella Toone	Manchester United	(Netherlands) Vivianne Miedema (vs. Aston Villa)	Manchester City	
February	(Netherlands) Renée Slegers	Arsenal	(Spain) Mariona Caldentey	Arsenal	(Belgium) Janice Cayman (vs. Aston Villa)	Leicester City	
March	(Netherlands) Renée Slegers	Arsenal	(Germany) Shekiera Martinez	West Ham United	(England) Grace Clinton (vs. Aston Villa)	Manchester United	
April	(Spain) Natalia Arroyo	Aston Villa	(Germany) Shekiera Martinez	West Ham United	(France) Viviane Asseyi (vs. Crystal Palace)	West Ham United	

=== Annual awards ===
Award	Winner	Club
Barclays WSL Player of the Season	(Spain) Mariona Caldentey	Arsenal
Barclays WSL Manager of the Season	(France) Sonia Bompastor	Chelsea
Barclays WSL Goal of the Season	(Netherlands) Vivianne Miedema (vs. Aston Villa)	Manchester City
Barclays WSL Rising Star	(Germany) Shekiera Martinez	West Ham United
PFA Players' Player of the Year	(Spain) Mariona Caldentey	Arsenal
PFA Young Player of the Year	(Canada) Olivia Smith	Liverpool
FWA Footballer of the Year	(England) Alessia Russo	Arsenal

PFA Team of the Year
Goalkeeper	(United States) Phallon Tullis-Joyce (Manchester United)			
Defenders	(United States) Emily Fox (Arsenal)	(England) Maya Le Tissier (Manchester United)	(England) Millie Bright (Chelsea)	(Canada) Jayde Riviere (Manchester United)
Midfielders	(Scotland) Kim Little (Arsenal)		(Scotland) Erin Cuthbert (Chelsea)	(Japan) Yui Hasegawa (Manchester City)
Forwards	(Australia) Mary Fowler (Manchester City)		(England) Alessia Russo (Arsenal)	(Spain) Mariona Caldentey (Arsenal)

== See also ==
- 2024–25 Women's FA Cup
- 2024–25 Women's League Cup
