= 2025–26 Women's Super League 2 =

Women's Super League 2
- Season: 2025–26
- Dates: 5 September 2025 – 3 May 2026
- Champions: Birmingham City; 2nd D2 title
- Promoted: Birmingham City; Crystal Palace; Charlton Athletic
- Relegated: Portsmouth
- Matches: 132
- Goals: 396 (3 per match)
- Top goalscorer: Lexi Lloyd-Smith (Bristol City) (11 goals)
- Best goalkeeper: Sophie Whitehouse (Charlton Athletic) (8 clean sheets)
- Biggest home win: Bristol City 7–0 Ipswich Town (9 November 2025)
- Biggest away win: Sheffield United 0–4 Sunderland (5 September 2025); Ipswich Town 0–4 Birmingham City (12 October 2025); Portsmouth 0–4 Birmingham City (24 January 2026); Sheffield United 0–4 Bristol City (2 May 2026)
- Highest scoring: Crystal Palace 4–4 Southampton (14 September 2025)
- Longest winning run: (5 games); Crystal Palace (16 November 2025 – 25 January 2026)
- Longest unbeaten run: (16 games); Charlton Athletic (7 September 2025 – 18 February 2026)
- Longest winless run: (9 games); Ipswich Town (5 October 2025 – 1 February 2026); Sheffield United (16 November 2025 – 22 March 2026)
- Longest losing run: (6 games); Portsmouth (21 December 2025 – 15 February 2026)
- All statistics correct as of 2 May 2026.

The 2025–26 Women's Super League 2 is the first season of the Women's Super League 2 since it was reverted to the WSL2 name, and the 11th since the creation of the WSL 2 in 2014. The season began on 5 September 2025 and will end on 3 May 2026.

On 16 June 2025 it was announced that the Women's Super League would be expanding to 14 teams for the 2026–27 season. Because of this, the 2025–26 WSL 2 season will have two promotions and a promotion/relegation play-off for the 3rd placed team.

== Teams ==
Location of clubs for the 2025–26 season

Twelve teams competed in the WSL2 for the 2025–26 season, an increase of one from the previous season.

London City Lionesses were promoted to the Women's Super League as 2024–25 Women's Championship winners. They were replaced by Crystal Palace who returned to the division following relegation from the Women's Super League after one season.

Nottingham Forest, winners of the 2024–25 FA Women's National League North, and Ipswich Town, winners of the 2024–25 FA Women's National League South were both promoted. Both clubs made their WSL2 debuts.

On 20 May 2025, it was announced Blackburn Rovers had withdrawn from the WSL2 due to the club owner's unwillingness to meet league requirements on facilities, player welfare and staffing. They re-entered at the fourth tier (Division One North). Sheffield United who were set to be relegated to the FA Women's National League after spending seven seasons in the Championship were reprieved from relegation.

Team	Location	Ground	Capacity	Manager
Birmingham City	Birmingham (Bordesley)	St Andrew's	29,902	(England) Amy Merricks
Bristol City	Bristol (Ashton Gate)	Ashton Gate	27,000	(England) Charlotte Healy
Charlton Athletic	London (Charlton)	The Valley	27,111	(England) Karen Hills
Crystal Palace	London (Sutton)	Gander Green Lane	5,013	(England) Jo Potter
Durham	Durham	Maiden Castle	1,800 (League); 2,400 (Cup)	(England) Neil Redfearn (interim)
Ipswich Town	Colchester	Colchester Community Stadium	10,105	(England) David Wright
Newcastle United	Gateshead	Gateshead International Stadium	11,800	(Australia) Tanya Oxtoby
Nottingham Forest	Nottingham (West Bridgford)	The City Ground	30,404	(England) Carly Davies
Portsmouth	Havant	Westleigh Park	5,300	(England) Jay Sadler
Sheffield United	Sheffield	Bramall Lane	32,050	(England) Stephen Healy
Southampton	Southampton	St Mary's Stadium	32,384	(England) Simon Parker
Sunderland	Hetton-le-Hole	Eppleton CW	2,500	(England) Melanie Reay

=== Managerial changes ===
Team	Outgoing manager	Manner of departure	Date of vacancy	Position in table	Incoming manager	Date of appointment
Crystal Palace	(Norway) Leif Gunnar Smerud	Mutual agreement	11 May 2025	Pre season	(England) Jo Potter	24 June 2025
Bristol City	(England) Stephen Kirby	Mutual agreement	13 May 2025	Pre season	(England) Charlotte Healy	24 June 2025
Southampton	(England) Marieanne Spacey-Cale (interim)	End of interim period	4 May 2025	Pre season	(England) Simon Parker	4 July 2025
Sheffield United	(England) Ash Thompson	Mutual Agreement	30 September 2025	12th	(England) Luke Turner (interim)	30 September 2025
Newcastle United	(England) Becky Langley	Sacked	20 October 2025	9th	(England) Claire Ditchburn (interim)	22 October 2025
Newcastle United	(England) Claire Ditchburn (interim)	End of interim spell	22 November 2025	4th	(Australia) Tanya Oxtoby	22 November 2025
Ipswich Town	(England) Joe Sheehan	Mutual agreement	7 January 2026	12th	(England) David Wright (Note: Wright was initially appointed as an interim manager, but the move was made permanent on 24 April 2026.)	7 January 2026
Sheffield United	(England) Luke Turner (interim)	End of interim spell	25 January 2026	9th	(England) Stephen Healey	25 January 2026
Durham	(England) Adam Furness	Mutual agreement	15 March 2026	9th	(England) Neil Redfearn (interim)	15 March 2026

== League table ==
Pos	Team	Pld	W	D	L	GF	GA	GD	Pts	Qualification
1	Birmingham City (C, P)	22	14	2	6	46	24	+22	44	Promotion to the WSL (Note: Dependent on obtaining a licence.)
2	Crystal Palace (P)	22	13	5	4	44	26	+18	44	Promotion to the WSL
3	Charlton Athletic (P, O)	22	12	6	4	31	21	+10	42	Qualification for promotion play-off
4	Bristol City	22	11	4	7	47	31	+16	37	
5	Southampton	22	10	5	7	44	26	+18	35	
6	Newcastle United	22	8	9	5	32	25	+7	33	
7	Nottingham Forest	22	9	3	10	27	35	−8	30	
8	Sunderland	22	6	6	10	28	35	−7	24	
9	Ipswich Town	22	6	5	11	26	42	−16	23	
10	Durham	22	5	7	10	27	35	−8	22	
11	Sheffield United	22	4	6	12	21	43	−22	18	
12	Portsmouth (R)	22	4	2	16	23	53	−30	14	Relegation to the Women's National League South

Source: WSL 2 League Table
Rules for classification: 1) Points; 2) Goal difference; 3) Number of goals scored
(C) Champions; (O) Play-off winners; (P) Promoted; (R) Relegated

== Matches ==
Home \ Away	BIR	BRI	CHA	CRY	DUR	IPS	NEW	NOT	POR	SHU	SOU	SUN
Birmingham City		5–1	0–1	1–3	3–0	0–3	4–2	5–1	5–2	2–1	1–2	1–0
Bristol City	0–1		2–1	2–3	2–1	7–0	2–1	1–2	2–0	4–0	0–2	3–0
Charlton Athletic	0–2	2–0		1–0	4–2	0–0	2–1	2–1	0–2	1–1	2–1	1–0
Crystal Palace	3–0	2–1	3–2		4–0	1–0	2–2	1–0	6–1	1–2	4–4	1–1
Durham	1–1	2–2	1–2	1–1		1–1	1–1	3–0	2–1	2–1	0–0	2–3
Ipswich Town	0–4	1–1	1–1	1–2	2–1		1–4	0–1	3–2	4–1	1–2	2–1
Newcastle United	2–0	2–2	0–1	0–0	0–1	1–1		1–1	2–0	1–1	1–0	3–1
Nottingham Forest	0–3	2–4	0–2	1–2	2–1	2–0	1–2		4–1	1–0	0–3	3–1
Portsmouth	0–4	2–2	1–1	2–1	0–2	1–2	1–2	0–1		1–0	2–5	0–1
Sheffield United	1–2	0–4	1–1	0–1	2–1	3–2	1–1	0–0	2–1		0–2	0–4
Southampton	0–1	0–1	2–2	3–1	1–1	4–0	1–2	2–3	4–0	5–2		1–1
Sunderland	1–1	2–4	0–2	1–2	2–1	2–1	1–1	1–1	2–3	2–2	1–0	

Source: Women's Championship Results and Fixtures
Legend: Blue = home team win; Yellow = draw; Red = away team win.

== Promotion play-off ==
23 May 2026
12:30 BST

Charlton Athletic	0–0 (a.e.t.)	Leicester City
	Report
Penalties
Bradley (penalty missed); Thestrup (penalty scored); Fitzgerald (penalty missed); Mason (penalty scored)	2–1	(penalty missed) Van Egmond; (penalty missed) O'Brien; (penalty scored) McLoughlin; (penalty missed) Payne; (penalty missed) Mouchon

The Valley, Charlton
Attendance: 3,979
Referee: Emily Heaslip

== Season statistics ==
=== Top scorers ===
As of 2 May 2026

Rank	Player	Club	Goals
1	(England) Lexi Lloyd-Smith	Bristol City	11
2	(England) Rio Hardy	Bristol City	10
3	(England) Amy Andrews	Sheffield United	9
4	(England) Mary Bashford	Southampton	8
4	(England) Lily Crosthwaite	Birmingham City	8
4	(England) Jessie Gale	Bristol City	8
4	(England) Beth Hepple	Durham Women	8
4	(England) Megan Hornby	Portsmouth	8
4	(Scotland) Kirsty Howat	Crystal Palace	8
4	(Republic of Ireland) Abbie Larkin	Crystal Palace	8
11	(Ghana) Chantelle Boye-Hlorkah	Nottingham Forest	7
11	(Sweden) Wilma Leidhammar	Birmingham City	7
11	(Greece) Veatriki Sarri	Birmingham City	7
11	(Suriname) Ashleigh Weerden	Crystal Palace	7
15	(England) Annabel Blanchard	Crystal Palace	6
15	(England) Ellie Brazil	Southampton	6
15	(New Zealand) Katie Kitching	Sunderland	6
15	(Republic of Ireland) Emily Murphy	Newcastle United	6
15	(England) Jordan Nobbs	Newcastle United	6
15	(England) Emily Scarr	Sunderland	6
15	(England) Jess Simpson	Southampton	6
22	(England) Rianna Dean	Ipswich Town	5
22	(England) Lucy Fitzgerald	Charlton Athletic	5
22	(England) Jodie Hutton	Charlton Athletic	5
22	(United States) Gillian Kenney	Charlton Athletic	5
22	(England) Beth Lumsden	Newcastle United	5
22	(Scotland) Michaela McAlonie	Southampton	5
22	(England) Sophie Peskett	Ipswich Town	5
22	(England) Molly-Mae Sharpe	Crystal Palace	5

=== Clean sheets ===
As of 2 May 2026

Rank	Player	Club	Clean sheets
1	(Republic of Ireland) Sophie Whitehouse	Charlton Athletic	8
2	(England) Fran Stenson	Southampton F.C.	6
2	(United States) Shae Yanez	Crystal Palace	6
4	(England) Fran Bentley	Bristol City	5
4	(England) Emily Batty	Nottingham Forest	5
6	(United States) Adrianna French	Birmingham City	4
6	(United States) Catriona Sheppard	Durham	4
6	(Finland) Anna Tamminen	Newcastle United	4
9	(England) Lucy Thomas	Birmingham City	3
10	(Republic of Ireland) Grace Moloney	Sunderland	2
10	(England) Jess Gray	Portsmouth	2
12	5 players		1

=== Discipline ===
As of 2 May 2026

	Most yellow cards	Total	Most red cards	Total	Ref.
Player	(England) Charlie Devlin (Bristol City)	6	(England) Izzy Collins (Portsmouth)	2	

== Awards ==
=== Monthly awards ===
Month	Manager of the Month		Player of the Month		Goal of the Month		Ref.
Month	Manager	Club	Player	Club	Player	Club	Ref.
September	(England) Amy Merricks	Birmingham City	(England) Emily Scarr	Sunderland	(England) Angelina Nixon	Portsmouth	
October	(England) Simon Parker	Southampton	(England) Jodie Hutton	Charlton Athletic	(Spain) Vicky Losada	Bristol City	
November	(England) Karen Hills	Charlton Athletic	(England) Megan Hornby	Portsmouth	(England) Mary Corbyn	Sunderland	
December	(England) Jo Potter	Crystal Palace	(England) Jordan Nobbs	Newcastle United	(Greece) Veatriki Sarri	Birmingham City	
January	(England) Charlotte Healy	Bristol City	(England) Lily Crosthwaite	Birmingham City	(England) Jessie Gale	Bristol City	
February	(Australia) Tanya Oxtoby	Newcastle United	(Netherlands) Ashleigh Weerden	Crystal Palace	(England) Lucy Watson	Durham	
March	(England) Amy Merricks	Birmingham City	(England) Aimee Everett	Crystal Palace	(England) Amy Andrews	Sheffield United	
April	(England) David Wright	Ipswich Town	(England) Beth Hepple	Durham	(England) Jordan Nobbs	Newcastle United	

=== Annual awards ===
Award	Winner	Club
Player of the Season	(Suriname) Ashleigh Weerden	Crystal Palace
Rising Star of the Season	(England) Abbie Larkin	Crystal Palace
Golden Boot	(England) Lexi Lloyd-Smith	Bristol City
Golden Glove	(Republic of Ireland) Sophie Whitehouse	Charlton Athletic

Team of the Season
Position	Player	Club
Goalkeeper	(Republic of Ireland) Sophie Whitehouse	Charlton Athletic
Defender	(England) Aimee Everett	Crystal Palace
Defender	(Northern Ireland) Neve Herron	Birmingham City
Defender	(Republic of Ireland) Chloe Mustaki	Nottingham Forest
Midfielder	(England) Emily Syme	Bristol City
Midfielder	(England) Beth Hepple	Durham
Midfielder	(England) Jordan Nobbs	Newcastle United
Midfielder	(Suriname) Ashleigh Weerden	Crystal Palace
Forward	(England) Lily Crosthwaite	Birmingham City
Forward	(Greece) Veatriki Sarri	Birmingham City
Forward	(England) Lexi Lloyd-Smith	Bristol City
