= Ashleigh Weerden =

Dutch footballer (born 1999)

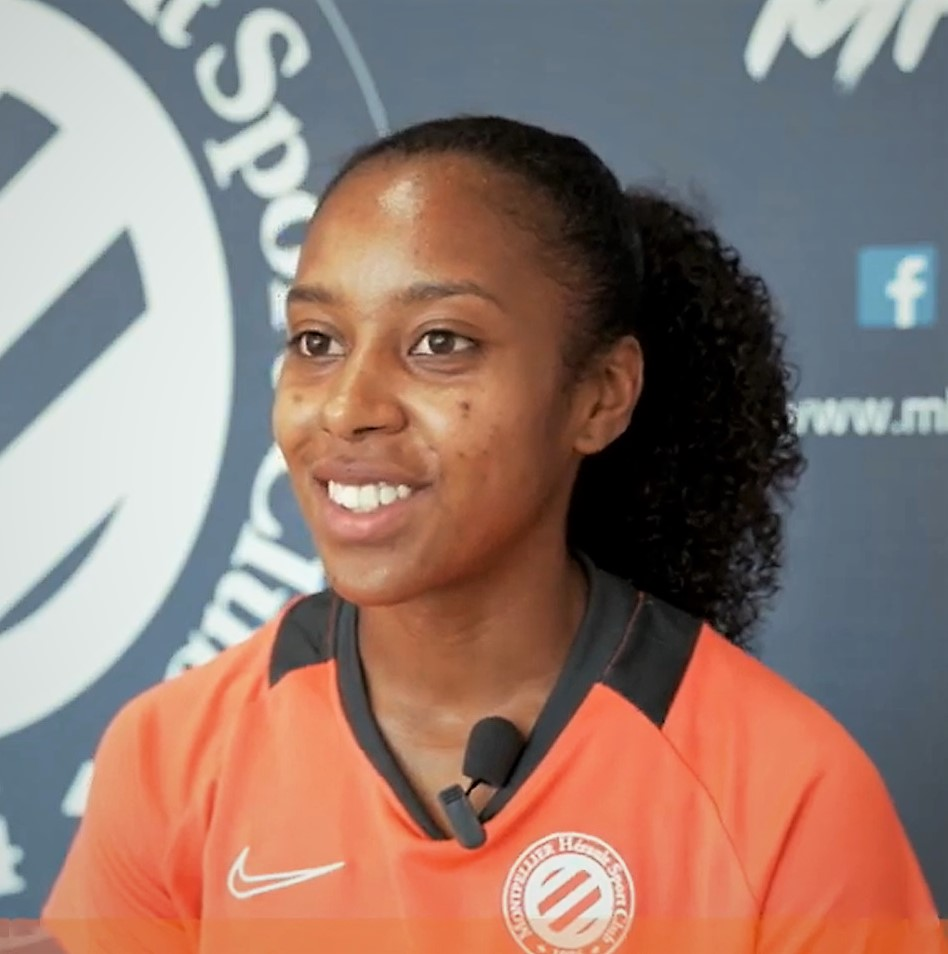
- Weerden in 2020

Personal information
- Full name: Ashleigh Joëlle Elisabeth Weerden
- Date of birth: 7 June 1999 (age 27)
- Place of birth: Amsterdam, Netherlands
- Height: 1.52 m (5 ft 0 in)
- Positions: Left winger; left-back

Team information
- Current team: Crystal Palace
- Number: 11

Youth career
- SC Buitenboys
- CTO Amsterdam

Senior career*
Years	Team	Apps	(Gls)
2017–2020	Twente	60	(6)
2020–2022	Montpellier	36	(1)
2022–2024	Ajax	30	(3)
2024–	Crystal Palace	31	(5)

International career
2015	Netherlands U16	7	(0)
2015–2016	Netherlands U17	8	(1)
2016–2018	Netherlands U19	31	(12)
2018	Netherlands U20	6	(0)
2019–2023	Netherlands U23	17	(2)
2019–2020	Netherlands	3	(0)
2025	Suriname		
- * Club domestic league appearances and goals as of 16 November 2025

Ashleigh Joëlle Elisabeth Weerden (Dutch: [ˈɛɕli ʑoːˈɛl eːˈlizaːbɛt ˈʋeːrdə(n)]; born 7 June 1999) is a Dutch professional footballer who plays as a left winger or left-back for Women's Super League club Crystal Palace.

== Club career ==
=== Twente ===
On 17 April 2017, Weerden was announced at Twente. She made her league debut against PEC Zwolle on 1 September 2017. She scored her first league goal against ADO Den Haag on 16 February 2018, scoring in the 27th minute.

=== Montpellier ===
On 30 June 2020, Weerden was announced at Montpellier. She made her league debut against Fleury 91 on 5 September 2020. She scored her first league goal against Le Havre on 21 November 2020, scoring in the 80th minute.

=== Ajax ===
On 16 June 2022, Weerden was announced at Ajax. She made her league debut against Fortuna Sittard on 16 September 2022. She scored her first league goal against Feyenoord on 4 March 2023. On 5 March 2024, it was reported that Weerden had suffered a knee injury that would keep her out for two months.

=== Crystal Palace ===
On 9 August 2024, Weerden joined Women's Super League club Crystal Palace.

== International career ==
Weerden made her senior team debut for Netherlands on 4 March 2019 in a 1–0 defeat against Poland.

Born in the Netherlands, Weerden is of Surinamese descent. She was called up to the Suriname national team in November 2025.

== Career statistics ==
=== International ===
As of 7 March 2020

Appearances and goals by national team and year
National team	Year	Apps	Goals
Netherlands
Netherlands	2019	2	0
Netherlands	2020	1	0
Total		3	0

== Honours ==
Individual

- UEFA Women's Under-19 Championship team of the tournament: 2016
