= Aimee Everett =

English footballer

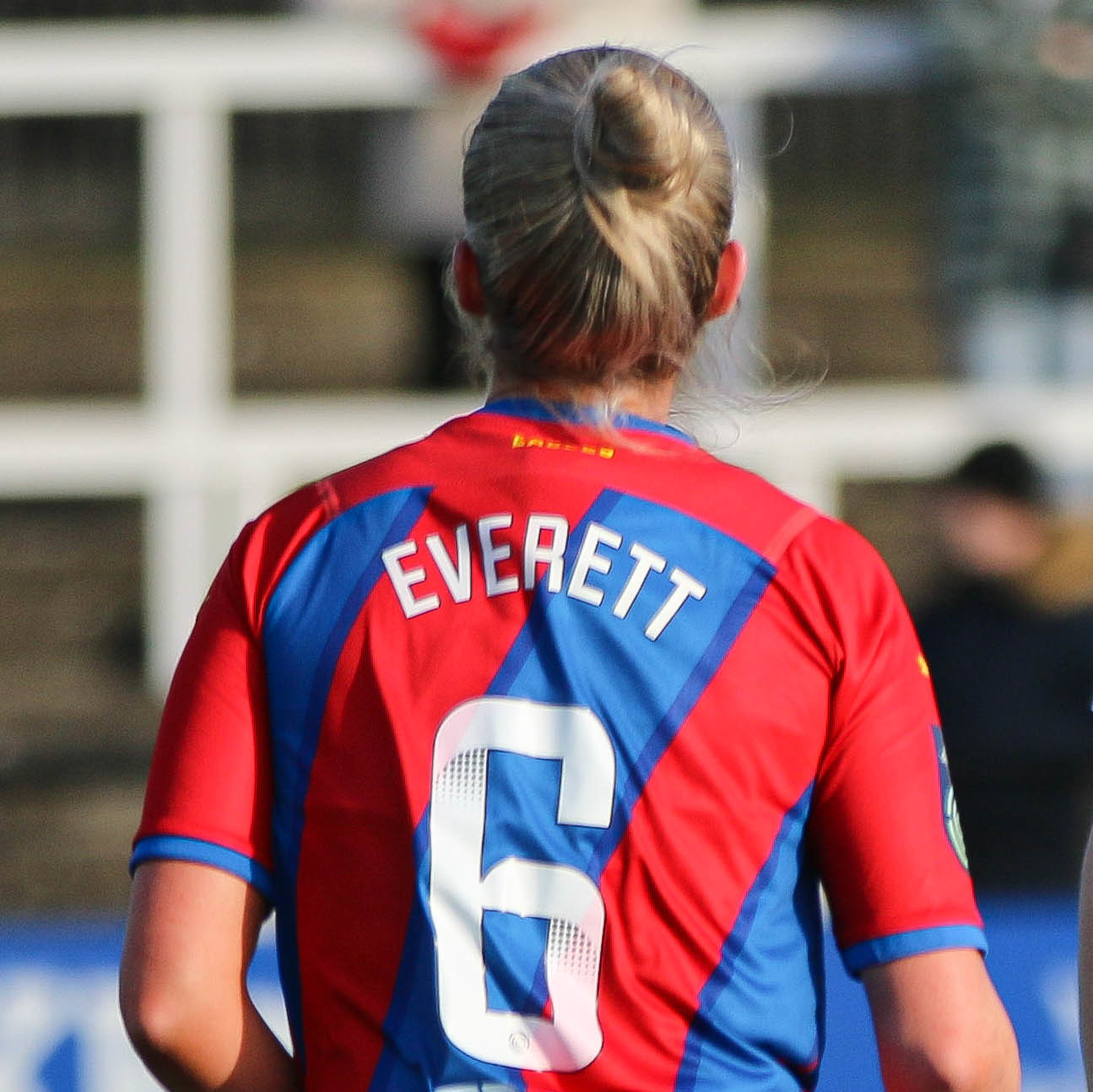
- Everett playing for Crystal Palace in 2022

Personal information
- Full name: Aimee Laura Everett
- Date of birth: 2 August 2001 (age 25)
- Place of birth: Barrow-in-Furness, England
- Position: Midfielder

Team information
- Current team: Crystal Palace
- Number: 6

Youth career
- Blackburn Rovers

Senior career*
Years	Team	Apps	(Gls)
2019–2021	Leicester City	18	(0)
2021–	Crystal Palace	65	(2)

International career^{‡}
2017–18	England U17	1	(0)
2019	England U18	2	(0)
2021–2022	England U19	8	(0)
- * Club domestic league appearances and goals as of 16 October 2024 ‡ National team caps and goals as of 16 October 2024

Aimee Laura Everett (born 2 August 2001) is an English professional footballer who captains and plays as a midfielder for Women's Super League club Crystal Palace.

== Youth career ==
Everett is a product of the Blackburn Rovers academy and signed with Liverpool in June 2017. She previously played for Preston North End, Holker Old Boys and Crooklands Casuals.

== Club career ==
In the 2023–24 season, Everett captained Crystal Palace to win the Women's Championship. On 16 January 2024, she signed a new one-year contract with Palace, On 23 August 2023, Everett was named permanent captain for the Crystal Palace.

== International career ==
In January 2016, Everett was called up to the England under-15 national team.

In May 2018, Everett was called up to the under-17s for the 2018 UEFA Women's Under-17 Championship, making one appearance during the tournament.

== Honours ==
Leicester City

- Women's Championship: 2020–21

Crystal Palace

- Women's Championship: 2023–24

Individual

- Crystal Palace Player of the Season: 2021–22
