= 2023–24 Women's Championship =

Women's Championship
- Season: 2023–24
- Champions: Crystal Palace
- Relegated: Lewes; Watford
- Matches: 132
- Goals: 361 (2.73 per match)
- Top goalscorer: Elise Hughes (16 goals)
- Biggest home win: Crystal Palace 9–1 Durham; 10 September 2023
- Biggest away win: Blackburn Rovers 0–4 Crystal Palace; 1 October 2023; Sheffield United 0–4 Birmingham City; 15 October 2023; Reading 0–4 Birmingham City; 20 March 2024; Durham 1–5 Crystal Palace; 31 March 2024
- Highest scoring: Crystal Palace 9–1 Durham; 10 September 2023
- All statistics correct as of 28 April 2024.

The 2023–24 Women's Championship season (known Barclays Women's Championship for sponsorship reasons) was the sixth season of the rebranded Women's Championship, the second tier of women's football in England, and the ninth season since the creation of the WSL 2.

In April 2023, The Football Association board announced changes to the Women's Championship, increasing the number of relegation spots in the 2023–24 season to two in order for both FA Women's National League champions (North and South) to win promotion at the end of the season. Previously only one team had been relegated and replaced by the winner of a playoff match between the Northern Premier Division and Southern Premier Division champions. The changes will not impact the structure of the Women's Super League with a one up, one down system.

On 14 April 2024, Watford were the first team to be mathematically confirmed as relegated from the Championship after only one season back in the second division. They sat seven points adrift from safety with two games remaining. Lewes' relegation was confirmed on 21 April 2024 after defeat to Crystal Palace coupled with a victory for Reading over Durham left Lewes four points behind with only one game left to play. Relegation ended Lewes' six-season spell in the Championship stretching back to the 2018–19 campaign. The 2023–24 Women's Championship title was still mathematically undecided until the final day of the season although Crystal Palace went in to the day three points ahead of Charlton Athletic and had a superior goal difference by 22. Crystal Palace secured the title with a point on the final day, playing out a goalless draw with Sunderland at Selhurst Park.

== Teams ==
Location of clubs for the 2023–24 season

Twelve teams competed in the Championship for the 2023–24 season, the same number as the previous season. Bristol City were promoted to the Women's Super League as 2022–23 Women's Championship winners. They will be replaced by Reading who were relegated on the final day of the 2022–23 Women's Super League season, ending a seven-season stay in the WSL which began in 2016 following the club's promotion as 2015 WSL 2 winners. Coventry United were relegated to the FA Women's National League after four seasons in the second division. They were replaced by the winners of the 2022–23 FA Women's National League playoff, Southern Premier Division winners Watford, who beat Northern champions Nottingham Forest 1–0. They returned after just one season away having been relegated at the end of the 2021–22 season.

Team	Location	Ground	Capacity	2022–23 season
Birmingham City	Birmingham	St Andrew's	29,902	2nd
Blackburn Rovers	Bamber Bridge	Sir Tom Finney Stadium	3,000	10th
Charlton Athletic	Crayford	Oakwood	1,180	4th
Crystal Palace	Sutton	Gander Green Lane	5,032	5th
Durham	Durham	Maiden Castle	1,700	7th
Lewes	Lewes	The Dripping Pan	3,000	9th
London City Lionesses	Dartford	Princes Park	4,100	3rd
Reading	Reading	Madejski Stadium	24,161	WSL, 12th
Sheffield United	Sheffield	Bramall Lane	32,050	8th
Southampton	Southampton	St Mary's Stadium	32,384	6th
Sunderland	Hetton-le-Hole	Eppleton CW	2,500	11th
Watford	Ruislip	Grosvenor Vale	4,085	WNL, 1st

=== Managerial changes ===
Team	Outgoing manager	Manner of departure	Date of vacancy	Position in table	Incoming manager	Date of appointment
Reading	(England) Kelly Chambers	Resigned	20 June 2023	End of season (WSL, 12th)	(England) Liam Gilbert	18 August 2023
London City Lionesses	(England) Nikita Runnacles (interim)	End of interim period	4 July 2023	End of season (3rd)	(Italy) Carolina Morace	4 July 2023
Crystal Palace	(England) Mike Lowne (interim)	End of interim period	14 July 2023	End of season (5th)	(England) Laura Kaminski	14 July 2023
Blackburn Rovers	(England) Matt Bee (interim)	End of interim period	17 July 2023	End of season (10th)	(England) Simon Parker	17 July 2023
Sheffield United	(England) Jonathan Morgan	Sacked	2 February 2024	8th	(England) Luke Turner (interim)	2 February 2024
London City Lionesses	(Italy) Carolina Morace	Sacked	7 February 2024	10th	(England) Darren Smith (interim)	7 February 2024
London City Lionesses	(England) Darren Smith (interim)	End of interim period	2 March 2024	10th	(England) Remi Allen	2 March 2024
Birmingham City	(England) Darren Carter	Mutual consent	11 April 2024	5th	(England) Emily Simpkins (interim)	12 April 2024
Birmingham City	(England) Emily Simpkins (interim)	End of interim period	15 April 2024	5th	(England) Amy Merricks	15 April 2024

== Table ==
Pos	Team	Pld	W	D	L	GF	GA	GD	Pts	Qualification
1	Crystal Palace (C, P)	22	14	4	4	55	20	+35	46	Promotion to the WSL (Note: Dependent on obtaining a licence.)
2	Charlton Athletic	22	13	6	3	32	17	+15	45	
3	Sunderland	22	12	5	5	31	18	+13	41	
4	Southampton	22	13	0	9	39	25	+14	39	
5	Birmingham City	22	11	3	8	33	19	+14	36	
6	Blackburn Rovers	22	11	3	8	25	28	−3	36	
7	Sheffield United	22	9	2	11	32	31	+1	29	
8	London City Lionesses	22	7	4	11	26	36	−10	25	
9	Durham	22	6	5	11	24	44	−20	23	
10	Reading	22	5	7	10	20	40	−20	22	
11	Lewes (R)	22	4	4	14	22	39	−17	16	Relegation to the Southern Premier Division
12	Watford (R)	22	4	3	15	22	44	−22	15	Relegation to the Southern Premier Division

Rules for classification: 1) Points; 2) Goal difference; 3) Number of goals scored
(C) Champions; (P) Promoted; (R) Relegated

== Results ==
Home \ Away	BIR	BLB	CHA	CRY	DUR	LEW	LCL	REA	SHU	SOU	SUN	WAT
Birmingham City		0–0	0–1	1–2	3–1	2–0	1–0	2–1	1–0	1–2	1–1	5–2
Blackburn Rovers	1–0		0–1	0–4	2–2	2–1 (Note: Originally scheduled to be played on 17 December, the Blackburn Rovers match against Lewes was postponed due to Lewes playing in the FA Cup.)	0–3	0–0 (Note: Originally scheduled to be played on 19 November, the Blackburn Rovers match against Reading was postponed due to a waterlogged pitch.)	2–1	2–1	0–2	1–0
Charlton Athletic	3–1	3–2		3–2	1–1	1–1	1–2	0–1 (Note: Originally scheduled to be played on 18 February, the Charlton match against Reading was postponed due a waterlogged pitch.)	1–1	2–0	1–1	2–3
Crystal Palace	1–0 (Note: Originally scheduled to be played on 3 March, the Crystal Palace match against Birmingham City was postponed due to a waterlogged pitch.)	4–0	0–1		9–1	3–2	6–1	1–1	1–0 (Note: Originally scheduled to be played on 30 September, the Crystal Palace match against Sheffield United was postponed due to the death of Maddy Cusack.)	3–4	0–0	3–0
Durham	1–0	2–1	0–1	1–5		2–0	1–0	0–2	2–5	1–0	0–1	0–2
Lewes	0–0	0–2	0–1	0–2	1–1		2–1	2–2	2–1	1–4	0–2	2–1
London City Lionesses	0–1	0–1	0–2	0–2	2–2	3–2		1–1	1–2	1–0	1–0	3–2
Reading	0–4 (Note: Originally scheduled to be played on 21 January, the Reading match against Birmingham City was postponed due to an outbreak of illness in the Reading camp.)	1–4	0–0	1–1	1–0	1–0	1–2		1–3	1–4	1–0	0–0
Sheffield United	0–4	1–3	2–2	2–0	0–1	1–0	3–1	5–1		0–1	0–1	1–0
Southampton	1–3	2–0	0–2	1–2	2–1	2–1	3–1	5–0	2–1		0–1	3–0
Sunderland	0–3	0–1	0–1	1–1	5–3	4–3	0–0	3–1	3–0	1–0		2–1
Watford	2–0	0–1	0–2 (Note: Originally scheduled to be played on 3 March, the Watford match against Charlton was postponed due to a waterlogged pitch.)	0–3	1–1	1–2	3–3	3–2	1–3	0–2	0–3	

Source: Source
Legend: Blue = home team win; Yellow = draw; Red = away team win.

== Top scorers ==
As of 28 April 2024

Rank	Player	Club	Goals
1	(Wales) Elise Hughes	Crystal Palace	16
2	(England) Isobel Goodwin	Sheffield United	15
3	(England) Annabel Blanchard	Crystal Palace	11
4	(England) Carly Johns	Watford	8
4	(England) Sophia Pharoah	Southampton	8
4	(England) Molly Sharpe	Crystal Palace	8
4	(England) Katie Wilkinson	Southampton	8
8	(England) Megan Hornby	Blackburn Rovers	7
8	(England) Molly Pike	Southampton	7
8	(England) Emily Scarr	Sunderland	7

== Awards ==
=== Monthly awards ===
Month	Manager of the Month		Player of the Month		Goal of the Month		Ref.
Month	Manager	Club	Player	Club	Player	Club	Ref.
September	(England) Laura Kaminski	Crystal Palace	(England) Annabel Blanchard	Crystal Palace	(England) Annabel Blanchard (vs. Durham)	Crystal Palace	
October	(England) Melanie Reay	Sunderland	(Republic of Ireland) Lucy Quinn	Birmingham City	(England) Araya Dennis (vs. Charlton Athletic)	Crystal Palace	
November	(England) Karen Hills	Charlton Athletic	(England) Gemma Lawley	Birmingham City	(England) Shauna Guyatt (vs. Watford)	Crystal Palace	
December			(England) Michelle Agyemang	Watford	(Republic of Ireland) Lily Agg (vs. Sunderland)	Birmingham City	
January	(England) Karen Hills	Charlton Athletic	(England) Emily Scarr	Sunderland	(Malta) Maria Farrugia (vs. Reading)	Lewes	
February	(England) Laura Kaminski	Crystal Palace	(Republic of Ireland) Isibeal Atkinson	Crystal Palace	(England) Emily Scarr (vs. Lewes)	Sunderland	
March	(England) Remi Allen	London City Lionesses	(Malta) Maria Farrugia	Lewes	(England) Beth Hepple (vs. Sunderland)	Durham	
April	(England) Karen Hills	Charlton Athletic	(England) Jade Richards	Blackburn Rovers	(England) Shanade Hopcroft (vs. Lewes)	Crystal Palace	
