= Leif Gunnar Smerud =

Norwegian footballer and manager (born 1977)

- Smerud in 2026

Personal information
- Full name: Leif Gunnar Smerud
- Date of birth: 24 January 1977 (age 49)
- Place of birth: Stavanger, Norway
- Height: 1.80 m (5 ft 11 in)
- Position: Midfielder

Team information
- Current team: Angel City (interim)

Youth career
- Våganes

Senior career*
Years	Team	Apps	(Gls)
1993–1996	Vidar		
1997–1999	Lillestrøm	59	(7)
1999	Lillestrøm 2	3	(0)
2000–2002	Viking	2	(0)
2001–2002	Viking 2	4	(0)
2003–2004	Mandalskameratene	52	(7)
2004–2005	Lyn	19	(1)
2012–2013	Hønefoss 2	3	(0)

International career
1992	Norway U15	4	(0)
1994	Norway U17	2	(0)
1995	Norway U18	9	(0)
1996–1997	Norway U20	4	(0)
1997–1998	Norway U21	5	(0)

Managerial career
- 2002: Viking (U20)
- 2007: Mandalskameratene (interim)
- 2009: Norway (women) (assistant)
- 2011–2013: Hønefoss
- 2014–2023: Norway U21
- 2016: → Norway (women) (caretaker)
- 2020: → Norway U18 (caretaker)
- 2020: → Norway (men)
- 2023: Norway (women) (interim)
- 2025: Crystal Palace (women)
- 2025: Brann (women)
- 2026: Angel City (assistant)
- 2026–: Angel City (interim)
- * Club domestic league appearances and goals

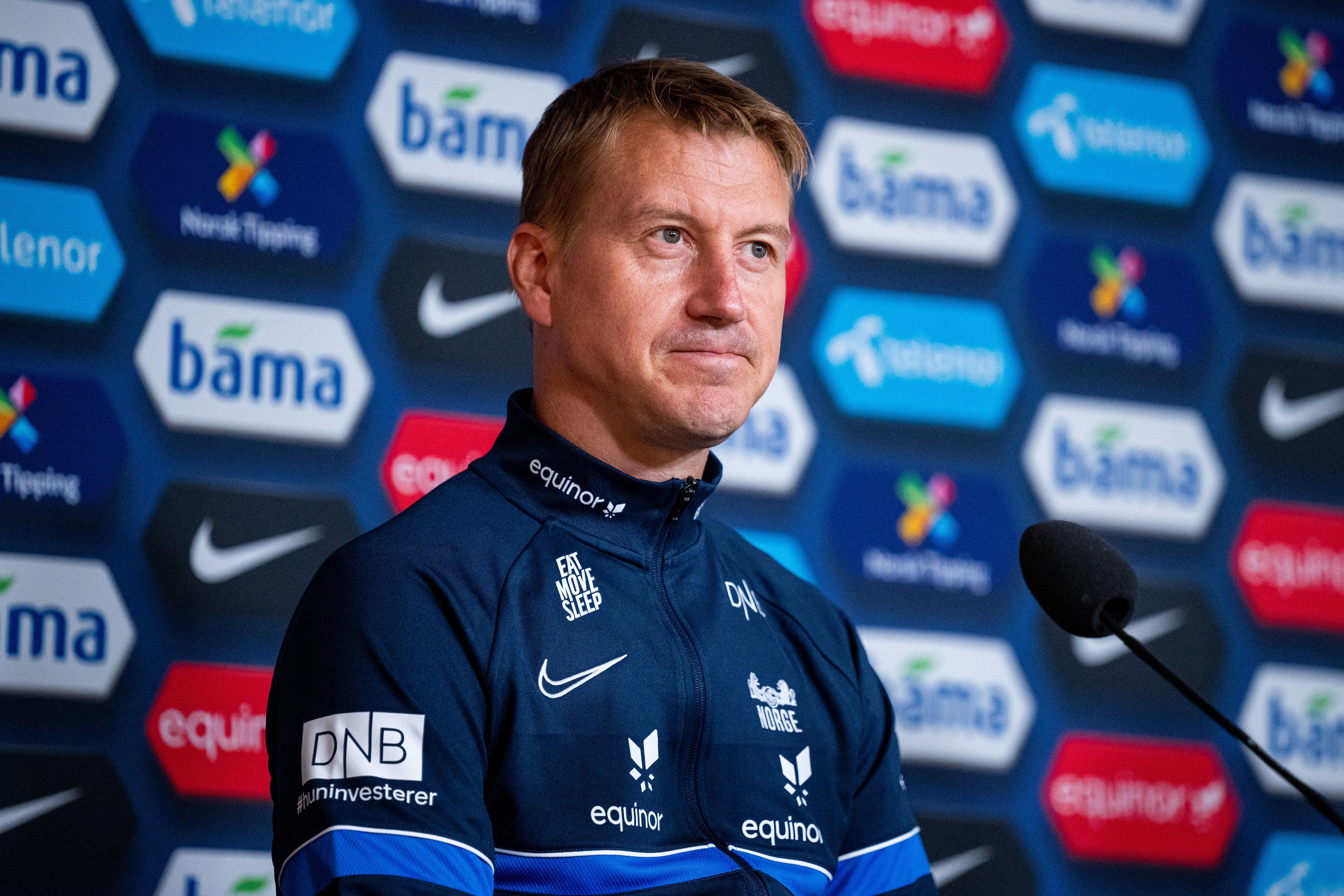
Smerud in 2023

Leif Gunnar Smerud (Norwegian: [læɪf ˈɡʉ̂nːɑr ˈsmèːrʉ(d)]; born 24 January 1977) is a Norwegian professional football manager, former player and psychologist who is currently the interim head coach of Angel City FC of the National Women's Soccer League (NWSL). He held the position of head coach for Norwegian under-21 side since 2014. In June 2022, he led the team into 2023 UEFA European Under-21 Championship.

Under Smerud, Norway managed to qualify for the 2023 UEFA European Under-21 Championship. This was only the third time in history Norway qualified for the competition. Smerud resigned after the championship had concluded.

== Background ==
Leif Gunnar Smerud has a Cand.Psych degree from the University of Copenhagen, and is a licensed clinical psychologist. He also studied at the Norwegian School of Sport Sciences. He holds a UEFA Pro license, and has been working as Deputy Technical Director in the Norwegian Football Federation.

== Club career ==
Smerud started playing for Våganes, but soon went to FK Vidar, where he made his first team debut at the age of 15. He made the national team U15 in 1992, and played at the 1995 UEFA European Under-18 Championship.

Helped by former coach legend Kjell Schou-Andreassen, he left Vidar after two promotions and two relegations in four years, for Lillestrøm SK in 1997. He played several positions during his career there. After Lillestrøm, he went on to play for Viking FK, where Benny Lennartson and Bjarne Berntsen identified him as a talent for coaching, and gave him the position as head coach for the Jr-elite team in 2002, whilst playing. After Viking he went to FK Mandalskameratene and FC Lyn Oslo, before retiring at the age of 28.

== Managerial career ==
Smerud's first head coach position came for Hønefoss BK in 2011 in Norwegian First Division. He helped the team to be promoted in his first year, an accomplishment for which he was awarded the Young Coach of the Year award in Norway. He led Hønefoss in Eliteserien in 2012 and 2013, before starting his work as U21-National Team coach in 2014. He has also won the bronze medal as assistant coach for the Norway women's national football team, in the UEFA Women's Euro 2009. He was the interim manager for the same team in 2016.

Smerud made headlines in Norway when he became the manager of the Norway national football team in the Nations League, in November 2020. When the regular coaching staff was quarantined, he was asked to gather and lead the team to a win in the decisive game against Austria. The team was praised for their performance, despite a 1–1 draw.

On 1 March 2025, Smerud was announced at Crystal Palace. At the end of the season, he left the club.

On 1 August 2025, Smerud was announced at Brann on a two year contract.

In May 2026, Smerud joined National Women's Soccer League club Angel City FC as a senior assistant coach. The following month, he was elevated to the role of acting head coach after Alexander Straus was fired on 17 June.

== Managerial statistics ==
Managerial record by team and tenure
Team	From	To	Record					
Team	From	To	P	W	D	L	Win %	Ref.
Mandalskameratene	15 June 2007	27 August 2007	10	0	3	7	0.00	
Hønefoss	1 January 2011	31 December 2013	97	33	32	32	34.02	
Norway U21	27 February 2014	9 July 2023	68	30	9	29	44.12	
Norway U18	1 January 2020	23 July 2020	3	1	0	2	33.33	
Norway	16 November 2020	18 November 2020	1	0	1	0	0.00	
Norway Women (interim)	5 September 2023	5 December 2023	6	1	2	3	16.67	
Crystal Palace F.C. Women	1 March 2025	11 May 2025	9	1	1	7	11.11	
Brann Women	1 August 2025	Present	9	9	0	0	100.00	
Total			203	75	48	80	36.95	
