= Crystal Palace F.C. Women =

Women's association football club based in southeast London

Crystal Palace Women
- Full name: Crystal Palace Football Club Women
- Nickname: The Eagles
- Founded: 1992
- Ground: VBS Community Stadium
- Capacity: 5,013
- Chairman: Steve Parish
- Manager: Jo Potter
- League: Women's Super League
- 2025–26: WSL 2, 2nd of 12 (promoted)
- Website: cpfc.co.uk/women
Home colours	Away colours	Third colours

Crystal Palace Football Club Women is a women's association football club based in South London, England, which competes in the Women's Super League, the top-tier of English women's football. The team, known as the "Eagles", is affiliated to the men's equivalent.

The club play its home matches at the VBS Community Stadium in Sutton, South London, as well as select matches at Selhurst Park. They previously played at Hayes Lane, the home ground of Bromley F.C., between 2014 and 2023.

== History ==
The club was formed in 1992 as Crystal Palace Ladies F.C.. Since 2003, the club has risen up England's football pyramid, winning the South East Combination Women's Football League in 2003–04, and they later achieved their first cup success defeating Chelsea in the Surrey FA County Cup final in 2011. Palace won the London and South East Women's Regional Football League title in 2013–14, gaining promotion to the FA Women's National League regional section. They won the South East Division One title in 2015–16, after going the whole season undefeated. The club also won the Surrey FA County Cup that same season against AFC Wimbledon in the final.

In 2018, Crystal Palace were given semi-professional status, and secured a Tier 2 license, allowing them to become a founding member of the FA Women's Championship, the second highest tier in women’s football. Then in 2019, it was announced by the club they would play under the name "Crystal Palace F.C." instead of "Crystal Palace Ladies F.C.", following the growing trend within the women's game at that time to move away from the term "Ladies".

Following mixed results in their first three years in the Women's Championship, Palace recorded back-to-back top-five finishes in the 2021–22 and 2022–23 seasons. It was around this time that the club officially became part of the CPFC Limited group in June 2022, and they received full professional status in 2023, followed by the securing of a Tier 1 license in April 2024, which would allow their eventual entry into the Women's Super League (WSL).

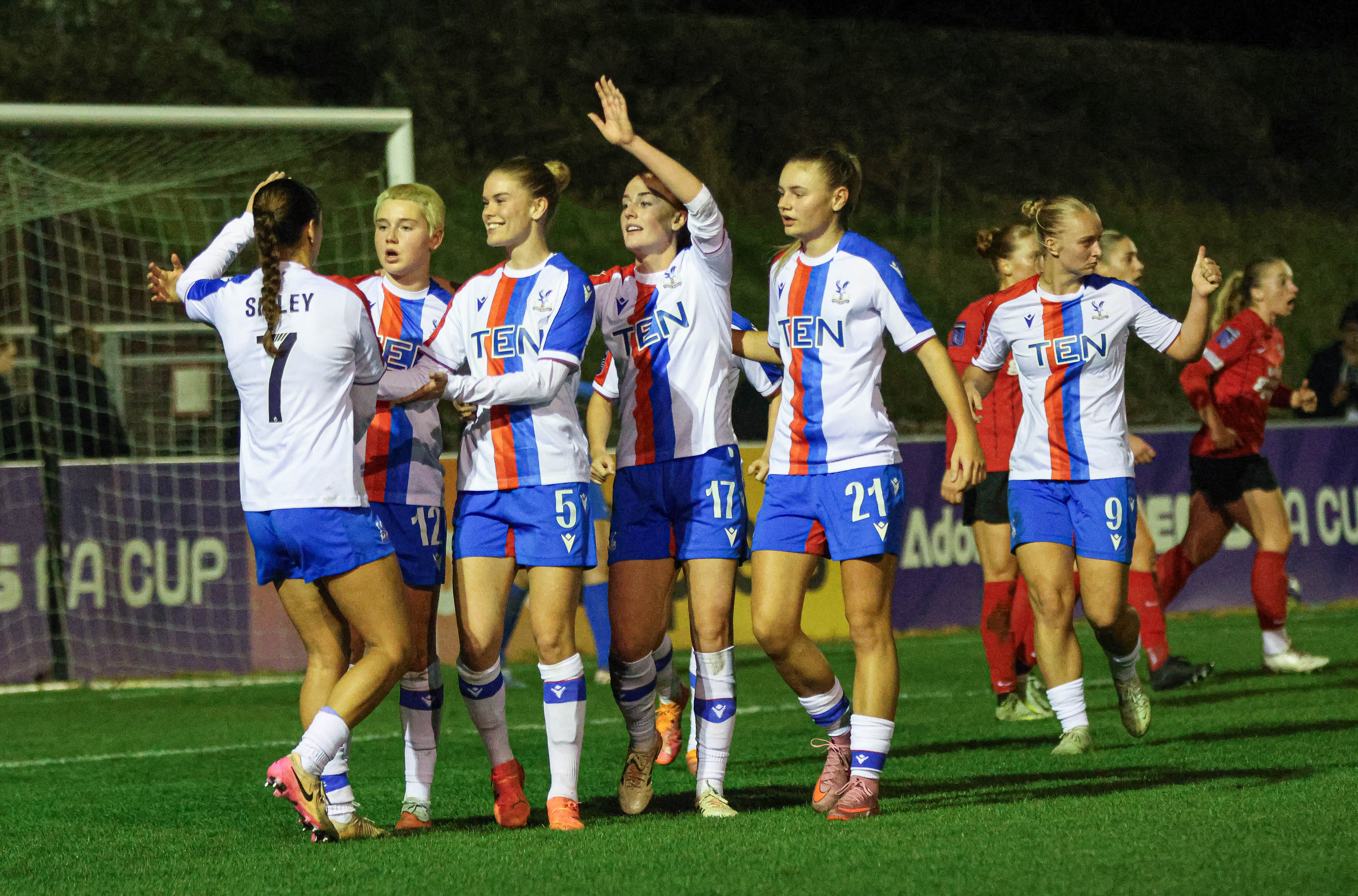
My Cato and teammates in December 2025

In the summer of 2023, the club appointed Grace Williams, as Head of Women’s Football, and Laura Kaminski, as Head Coach. This resulted in Palace gaining promotion to the Women's Super League as champions at the end of the 2023–24 Championship season. The club scored 55 goals – and conceded just 20 – in 22 matches. It also marked Palace’s inaugural promotion to the top-flight of women’s football. The promotion was sealed with a final-day draw against Sunderland at Selhurst Park, in front of a record crowd of 6,796.

However, the club's inaugural season in the top-flight ended in huge disappointment finishing in bottom place and returning to the WSL2. Following their relegation, Jo Potter was appointed as manager on 24 June 2025. Potter guided the club back to the top-tier after finishing runners-up in the WSL2 in the 2025–26 season.

== Players ==
=== Current squad ===
As of 29 October 2026

Note: Flags indicate national team as defined under FIFA eligibility rules; some limited exceptions apply. Players may hold more than one non-FIFA nationality.

No.	Pos.	Nation	Player
3	MF	SCO	Jamie-Lee Napier
4	MF	USA	Sierra Enge
5	MF	SWE	My Cato
6	DF	ENG	Aimee Everett (captain)
7	FW	ENG	Lexi Lloyd-Smith
8	FW	ENG	Molly-Mae Sharpe
9	FW	ENG	Bethany England
10	FW	SCO	Kirsty Howat
11	FW	SUR	Ashleigh Weerden
12	DF	PUR	Caitlin Cosme
14	MF	WAL	Josie Green
15	MF	IRL	Hayley Nolan
16	DF	WAL	Hayley Ladd
17	FW	ENG	Annabel Blanchard

No.	Pos.	Nation	Player
18	MF	BEL	Justine Vanhaevermaet
19	FW	IRL	Abbie Larkin
22	DF	ENG	Teyah Goldie (on loan from London City Lionesses)
24	MF	IRL	Shanade Hopcroft
25	MF	JPN	Fuka Tsunoda (on loan from Brighton & Hove Albion)
26	GK	FRA	Pauline Peyraud-Magnin (on loan from Denver Summit)
27	FW	ENG	Shannon O'Brien
29	DF	JAM	Allyson Swaby
30	GK	USA	Shae Yáñez
32	DF	ENG	Molly Bartrip
56	GK	NGR	Comfort Erhabor
61	MF	ENG	Amy Moynihan

== Club staff ==
Position	Name
Chairman	(England) Steve Parish
Head of women's football	(England) Jake Piper
Manager	(England) Jo Potter
Assistant Manager	(England) Adam Jeffrey
Goalkeeping Coach	(Italy) Daniel Matraszek
Physical Performance Coach	Reece Killpack
Physiotherapist	(Italy) Tadej Citti

=== Managerial history ===
As of 20 April, 2026:

Name	Tenure	Refs
(England) Laura Kaminski	July 2023 – 28 February 2025	
(Norway) Leif Gunnar Smerud	1 March 2025 – 11 May 2025	
(England) Jo Potter	24 June 2025 –	

== Honours ==
=== Leagues ===
- Women's Championship/WSL 2 (level 2)
  - Champions: 2023–24
  - Runners-up: 2025–26
- FA Women's National League South East Division One
  - Champions: 2015–16
- London and South East Women's Regional Football League
  - Champions: 2013–14
- South East Combination Women's Football League
  - Champions: 2003–04

=== Cups ===
- Surrey County Cup
  - Winners: 2010–11, 2015–16
  - Runners-up: 2005–06, 2007–08, 2012–13
- Capital Women's Senior Cup
  - Runners-up: 2017–18

== In popular culture ==
In 2019, the Palace Women team featured in the first episode of Harry's Heroes: The Full English, a documentary broadcast on the ITV television network. They played a team of male former professional footballers losing the match 1–0.

== See also ==
- Crystal Palace Baltimore
