= 2026–27 Leicester City W.F.C. season =

Leicester City
2026–27 season
- Manager: Rick Passmoor
- Stadium: King Power Stadium, Leicester
- WSL 2: 9th
- FA Cup: Third round
- Players Cup: League Phase, 19th
- Top goalscorer: League: Asmita Ale; Paulina Nyström (2 Goals each); All: Paulina Nyström (3 Goals)
- Highest home attendance: 1,761 (vs Ipswich Town, 20 September 2026)
- Lowest home attendance: 1,271 (vs Durham, 13 September 2026)
- Average home league attendance: 1,565
- Biggest win: 4–2 vs Durham (H) (WSL 2 – 13 September 2026)
- Biggest defeat: 0–7 vs Tottenham Hotspur (A) (Players Cup – 18 November 2026)
Home colours	Away colours	Third colours
- All statistics correct as of 18 November 2026.

The 2026–27 Leicester City W.F.C. season is the club's 23rd season of existence and their first in the Women's Super League 2 since 2021. Along with competing in the WSL 2, the club also compete in two domestic cup competitions: the FA Cup and the Players Cup.

== Current squad ==
As of 20 September 2026

Note: Flags indicate national team as defined under FIFA eligibility rules; some limited exceptions apply. Players may hold more than one non-FIFA nationality.

No.	Pos.	Nation	Player
1	GK	WAL	Olivia Clark
2	DF	ENG	Sarah Mayling
3	MF	ENG	Sam Tierney (captain)
4	DF	SCO	Leah Eddie
6	MF	USA	Celeste Boureille
7	FW	SUI	Alisha Lehmann
8	MF	SWE	Emma Jansson
9	FW	ENG	Poppy Pritchard
10	FW	ENG	Missy Goodwin
11	DF	IRL	Heather Payne
12	DF	ENG	Asmita Ale
15	MF	ENG	Simone Sherwood
16	GK	IRL	Katie Keane

No.	Pos.	Nation	Player
17	FW	FIN	Paulina Nyström
18	MF	SWE	Emilia Pelgander
19	FW	ENG	Denny Draper
22	DF	IRL	Jessie Stapleton
23	MF	ENG	Libby Bance
24	MF	ENG	Olivia McLoughlin
30	FW	ENG	Araya Dennis (on loan from Tottenham Hotspur)
31	MF	IRL	Jess Ziu
41	GK	WAL	Pheobe Baker
46	FW	WAL	Ffion Bowen
49	DF	ENG	Ella Collinson
64	MF	ENG	Beau King
71	GK	ENG	Hannah Kirk

== Transfers ==
=== Transfers in ===
Date	Position	Nationality	Name	From	Ref.
7 July 2026	DF	(Scotland)	Leah Eddie	(Scotland) Rangers	
24 July 2026	FW	(England)	Sarah Mayling	(England) Aston Villa	
29 July 2026	DF	(Republic of Ireland)	Jessie Stapleton	(England) West Ham United	
29 July 2026	MF	(Republic of Ireland)	Jess Ziu	(England) West Ham United	
11 August 2026	MF	(England)	Libby Bance	(England) Brighton & Hove Albion	
14 August 2026	FW	(Finland)	Paulina Nyström	(Sweden) BK Häcken FF	
17 August 2026	FW	(England)	Poppy Pritchard	(England) Manchester City	

=== Loans in ===
Date	Position	Nationality	Name	From	Ref.
25 August 2026	FW	(England)	Araya Dennis	(England) Tottenham Hotspur	

=== Transfers out ===
Date	Position	Nationality	Name	To	Ref.
1 June 2026	FW	(Wales)	Hannah Cain	(England) Everton	
1 June 2026	DF	(Jamaica)	Chantelle Swaby	(Canada) Vancouver Rise FC	
1 June 2026	FW	(Morocco)	Rosella Ayane	(England) Ipswich Town	
14 July 2026	FW	(France)	Noémie Mouchon	(England) Everton	
22 July 2026	FW	(Finland)	Jutta Rantala	(England) Everton	
24 July 2026	GK	(Germany)	Janina Leitzig	(England) Manchester United	
24 July 2026	MF	(England)	Nelly Las	(England) Chelsea	
28 July 2026	DF	(Belgium)	Sari Kees	(Netherlands) Ajax	
29 July 2026	DF	(England)	Ashleigh Neville	(England) Charlton Athletic	
30 July 2026	FW	(England)	Shannon O'Brien	(England) Crystal Palace	
4 August 2026	MF	(Australia)	Emily van Egmond	(England) Charlton Athletic	
7 August 2026	FW	(England)	Rachel Williams	(England) Burnley	
9 August 2026	DF	(France)	Julie Thibaud	(France) Marseille	

=== Loans out ===
Date	Position	Nationality	Name	To	Ref.

== Preseason ==
1 August 2026 Friendly	Leicester City	2–0	Rugby Borough	Belvoir Drive, Leicester
	Ziu; Ale	Report		Attendance: Behind-closed-doors

9 August 2026 Friendly	Leicester City	1–1	Manchester United	Belvoir Drive, Leicester
	Ale 20'	Report	Goal	Attendance: Behind-closed-doors

15 August 2026 Friendly	Liverpool	2–0	Leicester City
	Goal	Report		Attendance: Behind-closed-doors

19 August 2026 Friendly	Leicester City	2–4	Everton	Belvoir Drive, Leicester
	Tierney; Draper	Report	Goal	Attendance: Behind-closed-doors

== Competitions ==
=== Overall record ===
Competition	First match	Last match	Starting round	Record							
Competition	First match	Last match	Starting round	Pld	W	D	L	GF	GA	GD	Win %
Women's Super League 2	6 September 2026	8 May 2027	Matchday 1	8	2	2	4	9	14	−5	25.00
FA Cup	13 December 2026		Third round	0	0	0	0	0	0	+0	—
WSL Players Cup	23 September 2026		League phase	4	0	2	2	3	12	−9	0.00
Total				12	2	4	6	12	26	−14	16.67

Last updated: 18 November 2026
Source: Competitions

=== Women's Super League 2 ===
==== League table ====
Pos	Team	Pld	W	D	L	GF	GA	GD	Pts	Qualification
7	Wolverhampton Wanderers	8	3	1	4	16	18	−2	10	
8	Watford	8	2	3	3	12	15	−3	9	
9	Leicester City	8	2	2	4	9	14	−5	8	
10	Sheffield United	8	2	0	6	13	21	−8	6	
11	Burnley	8	0	2	6	4	19	−15	2	Relegation to Northern or Southern Premier Division

Updated to match(es) played on 15 November 2026. Source: WSL 2 League Table
Rules for classification: 1) Points; 2) Goal difference; 3) Number of goals scored

==== Results summary ====
Overall								Home						Away					
Pld	W	D	L	GF	GA	GD	Pts	W	D	L	GF	GA	GD	W	D	L	GF	GA	GD
8	2	2	4	9	14	−5	8	1	1	2	6	6	0	1	1	2	3	8	−5

Last updated: 15 November 2026.

==== Results by matchday ====
Matchday	1	2	3	4	5	6	7	8	9	10	11	12	13	14	15	16	17	18	19	20	21	22
Ground	A	H	H	A	A	H	H	A	H	A	A	H	H	A	A	H	A	H	A	H	H	A
Result	W	W	L	L	L	D	L	D														
Position	4	2	4	7	8	8	9	9														
Points	3	6	6	6	6	7	7	8														

Updated to match(es) played on 15 November 2026. Source:
W = Win; D = Draw; L = Loss

==== Matches ====
6 September 2026 1	Sheffield United	0–1	Leicester City	Sheffield
14:00 BST	Reavill (yellow card) 44'	Report	Pelgander (yellow card) 20' (yellow-red card) 86'; Mayling (yellow card) 44'; Cowan 55' (o.g.); Tierney (yellow card) 98'	Stadium: Bramall Lane; Attendance: 1,049; Referee: Ella Broad

13 September 2026 2	Leicester City	4–2	Durham	Leicester
15:00 BST	Nyström 29'; Ziu 45+2'; Ale 45+7'; Wilson 87' (o.g.)	Report	Hepple 8'; Pennock 74'	Stadium: King Power Stadium; Attendance: 1,271; Referee: Amy Fearn

20 September 2026 3	Leicester City	0–1	Ipswich Town	Leicester
15:00 BST	Stapleton (yellow card) 81'	Report	Roe 42'; Weir (yellow card) 89'	Stadium: King Power Stadium; Attendance: 1,761; Referee: Julia Kings

27 September 2026 4	Newcastle United	4–0	Leicester City	Gateshead
14:00 BST	Wardlaw 12' (yellow card) 16'; Antonsdóttir (yellow card) 66'; Thomas 67', 69'; Mannion 90+5'	Report	Mayling (yellow card) 90+1'	Stadium: Gateshead International Stadium; Attendance: 1,760; Referee: Grace Lowe

4 October 2026 5	Sunderland	3–1	Leicester City	Hetton-le-Hole
14:00 BST	Kitching 10'; Hughes 54'; Franssi 64'; Dent (yellow card) 80'	Report	Ale 24'; Pelgander (yellow card) 39'; Dennis (yellow card) 45+5'; Sherwood (yellow card) 69'; Payne (yellow card) 77'	Stadium: Eppleton Colliery Welfare Ground; Attendance: 513; Referee: Julia Kings

25 October 2026 6	Leicester City	2–2	Southampton	Leicester
15:00 BST	Dennis 3'; Nyström (yellow card) 12'; Lehmann 88'	Report	Jupp 30', 39'	Stadium: King Power Stadium; Attendance: 1,637; Referee: Francesca Catchpole

8 November 2026 7	Leicester City	0–1	Watford	Leicester
15:00 GMT		Report	Jones 35'	Stadium: King Power Stadium; Attendance: 1,589; Referee: Levi Gray

15 November 2026 8	Nottingham Forest	1–1	Leicester City	West Bridgford
14:00 GMT	McKenna 18'; Boye-Hlorkah (yellow card) 85'	Report	McLoughlin (yellow card) 36'; Ale (yellow card) 45'; Nyström 63', (yellow card) 79'	Stadium: City Ground; Attendance: 2,577; Referee: Ryan Atkin

20 December 2026 9	Leicester City	v	Burnley	Leicester
				Stadium: King Power Stadium

10 January 2027 10	Bristol City	v	Leicester City	Ashton Gate

24 January 2027 11	Wolverhampton Wanderers	v	Leicester City	New Bucks Head

27 January 2027 12	Leicester City	v	Nottingham Forest	Leicester
				Stadium: King Power Stadium

31 January 2027 13	Leicester City	v	Newcastle United	Leicester
				Stadium: King Power Stadium

7 February 2027 14	Burnley	v	Leicester City	Turf Moor

12 February 2027 15	Watford	v	Leicester City	Vicarage Road

14 March 2027 16	Leicester City	v	Wolverhampton Wanderers	Leicester
				Stadium: King Power Stadium

21 March 2027 17	Durham	v	Leicester City	Maiden Castle Sports Park

28 March 2027 18	Leicester City	v	Sheffield United	Leicester
				Stadium: King Power Stadium

4 April 2027 19	Ipswich Town	v	Leicester City	Colchester Community Stadium

11 April 2027 20	Leicester City	v	Bristol City	Leicester
				Stadium: King Power Stadium

2 May 2027 21	Leicester City	v	Sunderland	Leicester
				Stadium: King Power Stadium

8 May 2027 22	Southampton	v	Leicester City	Ten Acres

=== WSL Players Cup ===
Pos	Grp	Team	Pld	W	PW	PL	L	GF	GA	GD	Pts
17	NR	Newcastle United	4	1	0	0	3	6	7	−1	3
18	NR	Burnley	4	1	0	0	3	3	11	−8	3
19	SR	Leicester City	4	0	1	1	2	3	12	−9	3
20	SR	Watford	4	0	1	0	3	4	10	−6	2
21	SR	Bristol City	4	0	1	0	3	3	11	−8	2

Updated to match(es) played on 18 November 2026. Source: WSL Football
Rules for classification: 1) Points; 2) Goal difference; 3) Number of goals scored; 4) Number of wins; 5) Head-to-head record

==== League Phase ====
Following the competition's restructuring, Leicester City were drawn in the Southern Region for the league stage of the competition.

Win Draw Loss Fixtures

23 September 2026	Leicester City	0–2	London City Lionesses	Nottingham
19:30 BST	Payne (yellow card) 61'	Report	Parris 80'; Diani 88'	Stadium: Meadow Lane; Attendance: 473; Referee: Ben Speedie

17 October 2026	Watford	2–2 (3–0 p)	Leicester City	Edgware
15:00 BST	Wilson 54'; Filbey (yellow card) 75'; Skyers (yellow card) 78'; Perry (yellow card) 80'; Poole 90+1'	Report	Dennis 14'; Stapleton 64'; Mayling (yellow card) 79'	Stadium: The Hive Stadium; Attendance: 312; Referee: Alice Parker
	Penalties
	Perry (penalty scored); Poole (penalty scored); Filbey (penalty scored)		(penalty missed) Goodwin; (penalty missed) Pritchard; (penalty missed) Lehmann

1 November 2026	Southampton	1–1 (3–4 p)	Leicester City	Eastleigh
14:00 GMT	Goddard (penalty missed) 14'; McInnes (yellow card) 37', (goal) 67'; Murphy (yellow card) 45+1'	Report	Nyström 87'	Stadium: Silverlake Stadium; Attendance: 440; Referee: Callum Parke
	Penalties
	Edwards (penalty scored); Goddard (penalty missed); Mott (penalty scored); Murphy (penalty missed); Brown (penalty scored)		(penalty scored) Nyström; (penalty scored) Mayling; (penalty scored) Stapleton; (penalty missed) Bance; (penalty scored) Payne

18 November 2026	Tottenham Hotspur	7–0	Leicester City	Leyton
19:00 GMT	Holdt 5', 19'; Gunning-Williams 11', 15'; Blakstad (yellow card) 26', (goal) 58'; Gaupset 49'; Martinez 88'	Report	McLoughlin (yellow card) 45+5'	Stadium: BetWright Stadium; Attendance: 526; Referee: Alice Parker

22 November 2026	Leicester City	v	Wolverhampton Wanderers	Nottingham
15:00 GMT		Report		Stadium: Meadow Lane

16 December 2026	Leicester City	v	Charlton Athletic	Nottingham
19:00 GMT		Report		Stadium: Meadow Lane

== Squad statistics ==
Italics indicate a loaned in player.

=== Appearances ===
Starting appearances are listed first, followed by substitute appearances after the + symbol where applicable.

As of match played 18 November 2026

No.	Pos.	Nat.	Player	Women's Super League 2		FA Cup		Players Cup		Total	
No.	Pos.	Nat.	Player	Apps	Goals	Apps	Goals	Apps	Goals	Apps	Goals
1	GK	(Wales)	Olivia Clark	1	0	0	0	0	0	1	0
2	DF	(England)	Sarah Mayling	8	0	0	0	2+1	0	11	0
3	MF	(England)	Sam Tierney	2	0	0	0	0	0	2	0
4	DF	(Scotland)	Leah Eddie	1	0	0	0	0	0	1	0
6	MF	(United States)	Celeste Boureille	0	0	0	0	0	0	0	0
7	FW	(Switzerland)	Alisha Lehmann	4+4	1	0	0	3+1	0	12	1
8	FW	(Sweden)	Emma Jansson	0	0	0	0	0	0	0	0
9	FW	(England)	Poppy Pritchard	5+3	0	0	0	5	0	11	0
10	FW	(England)	Missy Goodwin	7+1	0	0	0	3+1	0	12	0
11	DF	(Republic of Ireland)	Heather Payne	3+4	0	0	0	3+1	0	11	0
12	DF	(England)	Asmita Ale	7+1	2	0	0	3+1	0	12	2
15	MF	(England)	Simone Sherwood	7+1	0	0	0	4	0	12	0
16	GK	(Republic of Ireland)	Katie Keane	7	0	0	0	4	0	11	0
17	FW	(Finland)	Paulina Nyström	6+2	2	0	0	2+2	1	12	3
18	MF	(Sweden)	Emilia Pelgander	4+1	0	0	0	3+1	0	9	0
19	FW	(England)	Denny Draper	0+3	0	0	0	1+2	0	6	0
22	DF	(Republic of Ireland)	Jessie Stapleton	8	0	0	0	4	1	12	1
23	MF	(England)	Libby Bance	5+2	0	0	0	3+1	0	11	0
24	MF	(England)	Olivia McLoughlin	3	0	0	0	3	0	8	0
30	FW	(England)	Araya Dennis	6+2	1	0	0	3	1	11	2
31	MF	(Republic of Ireland)	Jessica Ziu	4+1	1	0	0	0+1	0	6	1
46	FW	(Wales)	Ffion Bowen	0	0	0	0	0+2	0	2	0
64	MF	(England)	Beau King	0	0	0	0	0+1	0	1	0
Players who appeared for the club but left during the season:

=== Goalscorers ===
As of 18 November 2026

Rnk	No	Pos	Nat	Name	Women's Super League 2	FA Cup	Players Cup	Total
1	17	FW	(Finland)	Paulina Nyström	2	0	1	3
2	12	DF	(England)	Asmita Ale	2	0	0	2
2	30	FW	(England)	Araya Dennis	1	0	1	2
4	7	FW	(Switzerland)	Alisha Lehmann	1	0	0	1
4	22	DF	(Republic of Ireland)	Jessie Stapleton	0	0	1	1
4	31	MF	(Republic of Ireland)	Jess Ziu	1	0	0	1
Own goals					2	0	0	2
Total					9	0	3	12

=== Assists ===
As of 18 November 2026

Rank	No.	Pos.	Nat.	Player	Women's Super League 2	FA Cup	Players Cup	Total
1	10	FW	(England)	Missy Goodwin	1	0	2	3
2	17	FW	(Finland)	Paulina Nyström	2	0	0	2
3	3	MF	(England)	Sam Tierney	1	0	0	1
3	22	DF	(Republic of Ireland)	Jessie Stapleton	1	0	0	1
3	24	MF	(England)	Olivia McLoughlin	0	0	1	1
Total					5	0	3	8

=== Clean sheets ===
As of 18 November 2026

Rank	No.	Pos.	Nat.	Player	Matches played	Clean sheet %	Women's Super League 2	FA Cup	Players Cup	Total
1	16	GK	(Republic of Ireland)	Katie Keane	11	9.09%	1	0	0	1
2	1	GK	(Wales)	Olivia Clark	1	0.00%	0	0	0	0
Totals					12	8.33%	1	0	0	1

=== Disciplinary record ===
As of 18 November 2026

No.	Pos.	Nat.	Player	Women's Super League 2			FA Cup			Players Cup			Total		
No.	Pos.	Nat.	Player	Yellow card	(yellow card) (yellow-red card)	Red card	Yellow card	(yellow card) (yellow-red card)	Red card	Yellow card	(yellow card) (yellow-red card)	Red card	Yellow card	(yellow card) (yellow-red card)	Red card
2	DF	(England)	Sarah Mayling	2	0	0	0	0	0	1	0	0	3	0	0
3	MF	(England)	Sam Tierney	1	0	0	0	0	0	0	0	0	1	0	0
11	DF	(Republic of Ireland)	Heather Payne	2	0	0	0	0	0	0	0	0	2	0	0
13	DF	(England)	Asmita Ale	1	0	0	0	0	0	0	0	0	1	0	0
15	MF	(England)	Simone Sherwood	1	0	0	0	0	0	0	0	0	1	0	0
17	FW	(Finland)	Paulina Nyström	2	0	0	0	0	0	0	0	0	2	0	0
18	MF	(Sweden)	Emilia Pelgander	1	1	0	0	0	0	0	0	0	1	1	0
22	DF	(Republic of Ireland)	Jessie Stapleton	1	0	0	0	0	0	0	0	0	1	0	0
24	MF	(England)	Olivia McLoughlin	1	0	0	0	0	0	1	0	0	2	0	0
30	FW	(England)	Araya Dennis	1	0	0	0	0	0	0	0	0	1	0	0
Total				13	1	0	0	0	0	2	0	0	15	1	0
