= 2025–26 Leicester City W.F.C. season =

Leicester City
2025–26 season
- Head coach: Amandine Miquel (until 27 August); Rick Passmoor (interim from 4 September; from 10 October 2025 as permanent manager)
- Stadium: King Power Stadium, Leicester
- WSL: 12th (relegated)
- FA Cup: Fourth round
- League Cup: Group stage
- Top goalscorer: League: All: Shannon O'Brien (5)
Home colours	Away colours	Third colours

The 2025–26 Leicester City W.F.C. season was the club's 22nd season of existence and their fifth season in the Women's Super League, the highest level of the football pyramid. Along with competing in the WSL, the club also competes in two domestic cup competitions: the FA Cup and the League Cup.

== Season summary ==
On 27 August 2025, Amandine Miquel was sacked after one season at the club.

On 4 September 2025, Rick Passmoor was appointed as interim manager of the team. On 10 October 2025, he was appointed as manager of the team, signing a three-year contract with the club.

In the League Cup, they finished 2nd, with Crystal Palace only beating them on goal difference. In the FA Cup, the club went out in the fourth round.

On 29 April 2026, after their defeat to Arsenal, it was confirmed that Leicester would play in the relegation play-off at the end of the season. On 2 May 2026, it was confirmed that Leicester would play Charlton Athletic in the relegation play-off.

On 14 May 2026, it was announced that Leicester would play in the 2026 World Sevens Football tournament.

On 23 May 2026, Leicester were relegated to the Women's Super League 2 after their loss to Charlton.

== Squad ==
As of 27 January 2026

Note: Flags indicate national team as defined under FIFA eligibility rules; some limited exceptions apply. Players may hold more than one non-FIFA nationality.

No.	Pos.	Nation	Player
1	GK	GER	Janina Leitzig
2	DF	BEL	Sari Kees
3	MF	ENG	Sam Tierney (captain)
5	MF	AUS	Emily van Egmond
6	MF	USA	Celeste Boureille
7	FW	ENG	Missy Goodwin
8	FW	FIN	Jutta Rantala
9	FW	FRA	Noémie Mouchon
10	MF	SWE	Emma Jansson
11	FW	SUI	Alisha Lehmann
12	DF	ENG	Asmita Ale
13	GK	WAL	Olivia Clark
15	DF	IRL	Heather Payne

No.	Pos.	Nation	Player
16	GK	IRL	Katie Keane
17	DF	FRA	Julie Thibaud
19	FW	ENG	Denny Draper
20	DF	ENG	Sarah Mayling (on loan from Aston Villa)
21	FW	WAL	Hannah Cain
22	DF	ENG	Nelly Las
23	MF	ENG	Olivia McLoughlin
27	FW	ENG	Shannon O'Brien
28	FW	ENG	Rachel Williams
29	DF	ENG	Ashleigh Neville
31	DF	JAM	Chantelle Swaby
32	FW	MAR	Rosella Ayane

== Transfers ==
=== Transfers in ===
Date	Position	Nationality	Name	From	Ref.
4 August 2025	GK	(Republic of Ireland)	Katie Keane	(Republic of Ireland) Shamrock Rovers	
5 August 2025	MF	(United States)	Celeste Boureille	(France) Montpellier	
15 August 2025	DF	(Republic of Ireland)	Heather Payne	(England) Everton	
4 September 2025	MF	(Australia)	Emily van Egmond	(England) Birmingham City	
4 September 2025	MF	(England)	Olivia McLoughlin	(Scotland) Rangers	
4 September 2025	FW	(Morocco)	Rosella Ayane	(England) Tottenham Hotspur	
5 January 2026	MF	(Sweden)	Emma Jansson	(Sweden) FC Rosengård	
8 January 2026	DF	(England)	Ashleigh Neville	(England) Tottenham Hotspur	
15 January 2026	FW	(England)	Rachel Williams	(England) Manchester United	
22 January 2026	FW	(Switzerland)	Alisha Lehmann	(Italy) Como	

=== Loans in ===
Date	Position	Nationality	Name	From	Until	Ref.
4 September 2025	DF	(England)	Cecily Wellesley-Smith	(England) Arsenal	2 January 2026	
6 January 2026	DF	(England)	Sarah Mayling	(England) Aston Villa	End of season	

=== Transfers out ===
Date	Position	Nationality	Name	To	Ref.
30 June 2025	DF	(Scotland)	Sophie Howard	(Italy) Como	
30 June 2025	DF	(New Zealand)	CJ Bott	(New Zealand) Wellington Phoenix	
30 June 2025	DF	(Australia)	Courtney Nevin	(Sweden) Malmö FF	
30 June 2025	MF	(Japan)	Saori Takarada	(Japan) Cerezo Osaka Yanmar Ladies	
30 June 2025	MF	(Japan)	Yūka Momiki	(England) Everton	
30 June 2025	FW	(Canada)	Deanne Rose	(England) Nottingham Forest	
30 June 2025	FW	(Germany)	Lena Petermann	(Germany) Werder Bremen	
3 September 2025	MF	(England)	Ruby Mace	(England) Everton	
9 September 2025	FW	(France)	Shana Chossenotte	(France) FC Fleury	
8 January 2026	FW	(Belgium)	Janice Cayman	(Netherlands) PSV Eindhoven	

=== Loans out ===
Date	Position	Nationality	Name	To	Until	Ref.
24 September 2025	GK	(Republic of Ireland)	Katie Keane	(England) Sheffield United	31 September 2025	
12 January 2026	FW	(England)	Simone Sherwood	(England) Sheffield United	End of season	
27 January 2026	FW	(Iceland)	Hlín Eiríksdóttir	(Italy) ACF Fiorentina	End of season	

== Preseason ==
10 August 2025 Friendly	Leicester City	0–0	Everton	King Power Stadium
		Report		Attendance: Behind-closed-doors

== Women's Super League ==
=== Results ===
7 September 2025 1	Manchester United	4–0	Leicester City	Leigh
12:00	Toone 13'; Terland 25'; Malard 73', 87'	Report	Cain (yellow card) 37'	Stadium: Leigh Sports Village; Referee: Grace Lowe

14 September 2025 2	Leicester City	1–0	Liverpool	Leicester
12:00	O'Brien (yellow card) 7' (yellow-red card) 56'; van Egmond 59'; Leitzig (yellow card) 90+2'	Report	Evans (yellow card) 39'	Stadium: King Power Stadium; Referee: Lisa Benn

21 September 2025 3	Chelsea	1–0	Leicester City	Kingston upon Thames
12:00	Beever-Jones 7'	Report		Stadium: Kingsmeadow; Referee: Melissa Burgin

28 September 2025 4	Leicester City	1–2	Tottenham Hotspur	Leicester
12:00	McLoughlin (yellow card) 33'; Tierney 40'; Cain (yellow card) 50'	Report	Tandberg 15'; Holdt 21'; Summanen (yellow card) 50'; Ahtinen (yellow card) 63'; Hunt (yellow card) 85'	Stadium: King Power Stadium; Referee: Harrison Blair

5 October 2025 5	Leicester City	1–1	Everton	Leicester
15:00	Thibaud (yellow card) 32'; Ale (yellow card) 73'; Mouchon 81'; Cayman (yellow card) 90+1'	Report	Vignola 51'; Pacheco (yellow card) 66'	Stadium: King Power Stadium; Referee: Lisa Benn

12 October 2025 6	Aston Villa	0–0	Leicester City	Birmingham
14:00		Report	Tierney (yellow card) 80'	Stadium: Villa Park; Referee: Melissa Burgin

2 November 2025 7	Leicester City	1–4	Arsenal	Leicester
15:00	Tierney (yellow card) 77'; Mouchon 83'	Report	Russo 7'; Kees 32' (og.); Blackstenius 36', 84'	Stadium: King Power Stadium; Referee: Phoebe Cross

9 November 2025 8	West Ham	1–1	Leicester City	Dagenham
12:00	Gorry (yellow card) 4'; Martinez 51'	Report	O'Brien 90+7'	Stadium: Victoria Road; Referee: Kirsty Dowle

16 November 2025 9	Brighton & Hove Albion	4–1	Leicester City	Crawley
14:00	Mpomé (yellow card) 17', (goal) 47'; Haley 27'; Olislagers 87'; Seike 90+4'	Report	van Egmond (yellow card) 26'; Tierney (yellow card) 71'; O'Brien 75'	Stadium: Broadfield Stadium; Referee: Megan Wilson

7 December 2025 10	Leicester City	0–3	Manchester City	Leicester
15:00		Report	Shaw 74', 83'; Kerolin 90+4'	Stadium: King Power Stadium; Referee: Phoebe Cross

14 December 2025 11	Leicester City	1–0	London City Lionesses	Leicester
15:00	Swaby (yellow card) 24'; O'Brien 59'; Ayane (yellow card) 90+8'	Report		Stadium: King Power Stadium; Referee: Melissa Burgin

11 January 2026 12	Tottenham Hotspur	1–0	Leicester City	Leyton
14:00	Neville 40' (o.g.)	Report	Tierney (yellow card) 82'; Neville (yellow card) 90+3'	Stadium: Brisbane Road; Referee: Sophie Dennington

25 January 2026 13	Leicester City	1–2	West Ham	Leicester
15:00	Swaby (yellow card) 33'; Mayling (yellow card) 75'; Nyström 84' (o.g.)	Report	Hanshaw 34'; Martinez 63'; Siren (yellow card) 90'; Asseyi (yellow card) 90+2'	Stadium: King Power Stadium; Referee: Abigail Byrne

7 February 2026 15	Leicester City	0–2	Manchester United	Leicester
15:00	Tierney (yellow card) 79'	Report	Olme 13'; Lundkvist (yellow card) 49'; Terland 88'	Stadium: King Power Stadium; Referee: Stacey Fullicks

13 February 2026 16	Manchester City	6–0	Leicester City	Manchester
12:00	Shaw 22'; Miedema 28', 36'; Hasegawa 38'; Kerolin 48'; Fujino 66'	Report	Neville (yellow card) 62'	Stadium: Academy Stadium; Referee: William Davis

15 March 2026 17	Liverpool	2–0	Leicester City	St Helens
14:00	Olsson 10'; Holland 89' (pen.)	Report	McLoughlin (yellow card) 30'; Thibaud (yellow card) 87'	Stadium: Totally Wicked Stadium; Referee: Megan Wilson

22 March 2026 18	Leicester City	1–2	Aston Villa	Leicester
15:00	Lehmann 38'; Ale (yellow card) 45'; Neville (yellow card) 77'	Report	Taylor (yellow card) 28'; Patten 47'; Hanson 84'	Stadium: King Power Stadium; Referee: Stacey Pearson

29 March 2026 19	Leicester City	0–1	Brighton & Hove Albion	Leicester
15:00	Tierney (yellow card) 77'	Report	Symonds (yellow card) 29'; Seike 48'; Olislagers (yellow card) 59'	Stadium: King Power Stadium; Attendance: 2,453; Referee: William Davis

26 April 2026 20	London City Lionesses	5–1	Leicester City	Bromley
15:00	Corrales 32'; Goodwin 44'; Marcetto 59'; Geyoro 87'; Godfrey 89'	Report	O'Brien 30'	Stadium: Hayes Lane; Attendance: 2,308; Referee: Sophie Dennington

29 April 2026 14	Arsenal	7–0	Leicester City	Holloway
19:00 BST	Maanum 25'; Holmberg 27', 48'; Blackstenius 41', 45+5'; Caldentey 55'; Williamson (yellow card) 57', (goal) 63'	Report	Swaby (yellow card) 61'	Stadium: Emirates Stadium; Attendance: 18,130; Referee: Lisa Benn
Note: This fixture, originally scheduled for 31 January 2026, was postponed due to Arsenal's participation in the 2026 FIFA Women's Champions Cup.

3 May 2026 21	Leicester City	1–3	Chelsea	Leicester
15:00	O'Brien 42'; Neville (yellow card) 76'	Report	Kerr 13'; James 27', 33'	Stadium: King Power Stadium; Referee: Adewunmi Soneye

16 May 2026 22	Everton	1–0	Leicester City	Liverpool
1:00pm	Mace (yellow card) 62'; Pacheco 90+6'	Report	Tierney (yellow card) 44'	Stadium: Goodison Park; Referee: Alice Parker

=== Relegation play-off ===
23 May 2026 Relegation playoff	Charlton Athletic	0–0 (a.e.t.) (2–1 p)	Leicester City	Charlton
12:30	Mason (yellow card) 45+3'; Muya (yellow card) 77'; Fitzgerald (yellow card) 118'; Whitehouse (yellow card) 125'	Report	Ale (yellow card) 19'; McLoughlin (yellow card) 51'; Jansson (yellow card) 60'; Payne (yellow card) 115'	Stadium: The Valley; Attendance: 3,979; Referee: Emily Heaslip
	Penalties
	Bradley (penalty missed); Thestrup (penalty scored); Fitzgerald (penalty missed); Mason (penalty scored)		van Egmond (penalty missed); O'Brien (penalty missed); McLoughlin (penalty scored); Payne (penalty missed); Mouchon (penalty missed)

=== League table ===
Pos	Team	Pld	W	D	L	GF	GA	GD	Pts	Qualification or relegation
8	Everton	22	7	2	13	25	37	−12	23	
9	Aston Villa	22	5	5	12	28	48	−20	20	
10	West Ham United	22	5	4	13	20	45	−25	19	
11	Liverpool	22	4	5	13	21	34	−13	17	
12	Leicester City (R)	22	2	3	17	11	52	−41	9	Consigned to relegation play-off

Source: WSL League Table
Rules for classification: 1) Points; 2) Goal difference; 3) Number of goals scored.
(R) Relegated

== Women's FA Cup ==
18 January 2026	Tottenham Hotspur	3–0	Leicester City	Leyton
12:00	England 24'; Spence 74'; Summanen (yellow card) 84'; Gunning-Williams 90+1'	Report	Neville (yellow card) 64'; Jansson (yellow card) 88'	Stadium: Brisbane Road; Attendance: 1,062; Referee: Kirsty Dowle

== Women's League Cup ==
24 September 2025 Group stage	Ipswich Town	1–5	Leicester City	Myland
19:30	Seaby 39'; Wearing (yellow card) 52'	Report	O'Brien 45+1'; Ale 47'; Ayane 53'; Kaczmar 78'; Rantala 84'; Wellesley-Smith (yellow card) 87'	Stadium: Colchester Community Stadium; Attendance: 455; Referee: Richie Watkins

19 October 2025 Group stage	London City Lionesses	0–1	Leicester City	Bromley
14:00		Report	Rantala 2'; McLoughlin (yellow card) 22'	Stadium: Hayes Lane; Attendance: 990; Referee: Sophie Dennington

23 November 2025 Group stage	Leicester City	0–3	Crystal Palace	Nottingham
15:00	Ayane (yellow card) 22'; McLoughlin (yellow card) 68'	Report	Howat 6'; Vanhaevermaet 36'; Napier (yellow card) 41'; Blanchard 53' (yellow card) 56'; Littlejohn (red card); Sharpe (yellow card) 90+11'	Stadium: Meadow Lane; Referee: Alice Parker

=== Group D ===
Pos	Team	Pld	W	PW	PL	L	GF	GA	GD	Pts	Qualification
1	Crystal Palace	3	2	0	0	1	7	4	+3	6	Advanced to knockout stage
2	Leicester City	3	2	0	0	1	6	4	+2	6	
3	London City Lionesses	3	2	0	0	1	4	2	+2	6	
4	Ipswich Town	3	0	0	0	3	3	10	−7	0	

Source: Women's League Cup
Rules for classification: 1) Points; 2) Goal difference; 3) Number of goals scored; 4) Number of wins; 5) Head-to-head record

== Squad statistics ==
=== Appearances ===
Starting appearances are listed first, followed by substitute appearances after the + symbol where applicable.

As of match played 16 May 2026

No.	Pos.	Nat.	Player	Women's Super League		FA Cup		League Cup		Total	
No.	Pos.	Nat.	Player	Apps	Goals	Apps	Goals	Apps	Goals	Apps	Goals
1	GK	(Germany)	Janina Leitzig	14	0	1	0	0	0	15	0
2	DF	(Belgium)	Sari Kees	16+1	0	1	0	2	0	20	0
3	MF	(England)	Sam Tierney	21	1	1	0	3	0	25	1
5	MF	(Australia)	Emily van Egmond	15+3	1	0+1	0	1	0	20	1
6	MF	(United States)	Celeste Boureille	5+1	0	0	0	1	0	7	0
7	FW	(England)	Missy Goodwin	2+6	0	0	0	0	0	8	0
8	FW	(Finland)	Jutta Rantala	3+8	0	0	0	2	2	13	2
9	FW	(France)	Noémie Mouchon	2+14	2	1	0	1+1	0	19	2
10	FW	(Sweden)	Emma Jansson	6+3	0	0+1	0	0	0	10	0
11	FW	(Switzerland)	Alisha Lehmann	5+4	1	0	0	0	0	9	1
12	DF	(England)	Asmita Ale	19+2	0	1	0	2+1	1	25	1
13	GK	(Wales)	Olivia Clark	6	0	0	0	3	0	9	0
15	DF	(Republic of Ireland)	Heather Payne	3+6	0	0	0	1+1	0	11	0
16	GK	(Republic of Ireland)	Katie Keane	2+1	0	0	0	0	0	3	0
17	DF	(France)	Julie Thibaud	18	0	0+1	0	1+2	0	22	0
19	FW	(England)	Denny Draper	0	0	0	0	0	0	0	0
20	DF	(England)	Sarah Mayling	10	0	1	0	0	0	11	0
21	FW	(Wales)	Hannah Cain	20+1	0	0+1	0	0+2	0	24	0
22	DF	(England)	Nelly Las	0+4	0	0	0	1+1	0	6	0
23	MF	(England)	Olivia McLoughlin	17+3	0	1	0	2+1	0	24	0
27	FW	(England)	Shannon O'Brien	17+4	5	1	0	2	0	24	5
28	FW	(England)	Rachel Williams	4+4	0	0+1	0	0	0	9	0
29	DF	(England)	Ashleigh Neville	9+1	0	1	0	0	0	11	0
31	DF	(Jamaica)	Chantelle Swaby	14+3	0	1	0	3	0	21	0
32	FW	(Morocco)	Rosella Ayane	0+10	0	1	0	3	1	14	1
57	FW	(England)	Samantha Kaczmar	0	0	0	0	0+2	1	2	1
Players who appeared for the club but left during the season:
4	DF	(England)	Cecily Wellesley-Smith	0	0	0	0	1	0	0	0
11	FW	(Belgium)	Janice Cayman	9	0	0	0	1+1	0	10+1	0
14	FW	(Iceland)	Hlín Eiríksdóttir	5+4	0	0	0	2+1	0	0	0
24	FW	(England)	Simone Sherwood	0+1	0	0	0	1+1	1	0	0
