= Sarah Mayling =

English footballer (born 1997)

Personal information
- Birth name: Sarah Emma Mayling
- Date of birth: 20 March 1997 (age 29)
- Place of birth: Sutton Coldfield, England
- Height: 1.66 m (5 ft 5 in)
- Position: Full-back

Team information
- Current team: Leicester City
- Number: 2

Youth career
- Aston Villa

Senior career*
Years	Team	Apps	(Gls)
2014–2017	Aston Villa	23	(0)
2017–2021	Birmingham City	62	(0)
2021–2026	Aston Villa	83	(2)
2026	→ Leicester City (loan)	11	(0)
2026–	Leicester City	8	(0)

International career^{‡}
2012–2013	England U17	3	(0)
2014–2015	England U19	6	(0)
2017	England U23	1	(0)
- * Club domestic league appearances and goals as of 15 November 2026 ‡ National team caps and goals as of 6 October 2018

Sarah Emma Daly (née Mayling; born 20 March 1997) is an English professional footballer who plays as a defender for Women's Super League 2 club Leicester City. She progressed through Aston Villa's centre of excellence.

== Career ==
On 2 July 2021, Mayling rejoined Aston Villa, having started her career there, before joining Birmingham City in 2017.

In March 2025, Mayling suffered an ankle injury in their quarter final defeat in the FA cup against Manchester City, and was sidelined for six weeks. On 29 May 2025, it was announced that Mayling had signed a new contract, extending her time with the club to June 2027.

=== Leicester City ===
On 6 January 2026, Mayling was announced at Leicester City on a loan deal until the end of the season. On 24 July 2026, Mayling joined Leicester City on a permanent transfer for an undisclosed fee, signing a three-year contract. Mayling stated she was ''buzzing'' to return to Leicester on a permanent basis.

== Personal life ==
On 29 November 2024, Mayling announced her engagement to then-Aston Villa teammate Rachel Daly. As of September 2026, Mayling uses her married name (Daly) on her personal Instagram, but continues to use her maiden name professionally. On 12 September 2026, Mayling and Daly announced via a joint social media post that they were expecting their first child.

== Career statistics ==
=== Club ===
As of match played 15 November 2026.

Records may be incomplete due to lack of historical statistics.

Club	Season	League			FA Cup		League Cup		Total	
Club	Season	Division	Apps	Goals	Apps	Goals	Apps	Goals	Apps	Goals
Aston Villa	2014	Women's Championship		0			4	0	4	0
Aston Villa	2015	Women's Championship		0			0	0	0	0
Aston Villa	2016	Women's Championship		0			1	0	1	0
Aston Villa	Total		23	0			5	0	28+	0
Birmingham City	2017	Women's Super League	7	0	0	0	0	0	7	0
Birmingham City	2017–18	Women's Super League	11	0	0	0	2	0	13	0
Birmingham City	2018–19	Women's Super League	17	0	0	0	5	0	22	0
Birmingham City	2019–20	Women's Super League	9	0	0	0	3	0	12	0
Birmingham City	2020–21	Women's Super League	18	0	0	0	1	0	19	0
Birmingham City	Total		62	0	0	0	11	0	73	0
Aston Villa	2021–22	Women's Super League	21	1	1	0	3	0	25	1
Aston Villa	2022–23	Women's Super League	20	0	4	1	5	0	29	1
Aston Villa	2023–24	Women's Super League	21	1	1	0	6	0	28	1
Aston Villa	2024–25	Women's Super League	13	0	3	0	1	0	17	0
Aston Villa	2025–26	Women's Super League	8	0	0	0	3	0	11	0
Aston Villa	Total		83	2	9	1	18	0	110	3
Leicester City (loan)	2025–26	Women's Super League	11	0	1	0	0	0	12	0
Leicester City	2026–27	Women's Super League 2	8	0	0	0	3	0	11	0
Career total			187	2	10	1	37	0	234+	3
