= Jessica Ziu =

Irish footballer (born 2002)

Personal information
- Full name: Jessica Maria Ziu
- Date of birth: 6 June 2002 (age 24)
- Place of birth: Dublin, Republic of Ireland
- Height: 1.64 m (5 ft 5 in)
- Position: Midfielder

Team information
- Current team: Leicester City
- Number: 31

Youth career
- Rivermount Boys & Girls
- Shelbourne

Senior career*
Years	Team	Apps	(Gls)
2018–2022	Shelbourne	70	(22)
2022–2026	West Ham United	19	(0)
2025	→ Bristol City (loan)	2	(0)
2026–	Leicester City	5	(1)

International career^{‡}
2017–2019	Republic of Ireland U-17	16	(4)
2019–	Republic of Ireland U-19	3	(1)
2018–	Republic of Ireland	18	(0)
- * Club domestic league appearances and goals as of 4 October 2026 ‡ National team caps and goals as of 15:05, 26 November 2023 (UTC)

Jessica Maria Ziu (Albanian: [maˈɾi.a ziu]; born 6 June 2002) is an Irish professional footballer who plays as a midfielder for Women's Super League 2 club Leicester City and the Republic of Ireland national team.

== Club career ==
Ziu was born on 6 June 2002 and is from Dublin, Ireland. Her father moved to Ireland from Albania in 1998. She began playing soccer at five years old, and joined Rivermount Boys & Girls in Finglas where she was the only girl in the team.

=== Shelbourne ===
After starting the 2018 season with Shelbourne's youth team for the new Under 17 Women's National League, Ziu was quickly promoted to the club's senior panel. She made her Women's National League debut shortly after turning 16 years old in June 2018.

She enjoyed good form in the 2020 Women's National League, being named WNL Player of the Month for October 2020 and named in the Team of the Season. In 2021 she helped Shelbourne win the WNL title and played in the 3–1 2021 FAI Women's Cup Final defeat by Wexford Youths.

=== West Ham United ===
In March 2022, Ziu agreed a summer transfer to English FA Women's Super League club West Ham United. She made her league debut against Everton on 18 September 2022. In October 2022, Ziu suffered an anterior cruciate ligament injury in a 2022–23 FA Women's League Cup fixture against London City Lionesses.

On 29 August 2025, West Ham announced that Ziu would spend the 2025–26 season on loan at WSL 2 club Bristol City. Ziu made 4 appearances for Bristol City before returning to West Ham in January 2026.

=== Leicester City ===
On 29 July 2026, Ziu was announced at Leicester City.

== International career ==
=== Youth ===
Ziu represented Ireland at schoolgirl level while she attended Larkin Community College, Dublin City. At the FAI International Football Awards she was named 2018 Under-16 Women's International Player of the Year.

=== Senior ===
Ireland's senior national team coach Colin Bell called up Ziu for the first time in August 2018, for a home FIFA Women's World Cup qualifying fixture against Northern Ireland. "She's still very young. She's just turned 16, but needs to be in this environment," he said. She won her first cap in Ireland's 4–0 win, entering play as a 75th-minute substitute for Rianna Jarrett.

On 9 October 2018, she played in Ireland's 4–0 friendly defeat by Poland in Ostróda, coming on for Jarrett on 53 minutes. She won a third senior cap in a 1–0 friendly defeat by Belgium, at San Pedro del Pinatar, Spain in January 2019.

== Career statistics ==
=== Club ===
As of match played 4 October 2026

Appearances and goals by club, season and competition
Club	Season	League			National Cup (Note: Includes FAI Women's Cup, Women's FA Cup)		League Cup (Note: Includes Women’s National League Cup, FA Women's League Cup)		Total	
Club	Season	Division	Apps	Goals	Apps	Goals	Apps	Goals	Apps	Goals
Shelbourne	2018	Women's National League	9	3	0	0	0	0	9	3
Shelbourne	2019	Women's National League	18	6	2	0	3	0	23	6
Shelbourne	2020	Women's National League	11	5	1	0	0	0	12	5
Shelbourne	2021	Women's National League	20	5	3	0	0	0	23	5
Shelbourne	2022	Women's National League	12	3	0	0	0	0	12	3
Shelbourne	Total		70	22	6	0	3	0	79	22
West Ham United	2022–23	Women's Super League	3	0	0	0	1	0	4	0
West Ham United	2023–24	Women's Super League	16	0	1	0	2	0	19	0
West Ham United	Total		19	0	1	0	3	0	23	0
Bristol City (loan)	2025–26	Women's Super League 2	2	0	0	0	2	0	4	0
Leicester City	2026–27	Women's Super League 2	5	1	0	0	1	0	6	1
Career Total			96	23	7	0	9	0	112	23

=== International ===
As of match played 6 September 2022

Appearances and goals by national team and year
National team	Year	Apps	Goals
Republic of Ireland	2018	2	0
Republic of Ireland	2019	1	0
Republic of Ireland	2021	2	0
Republic of Ireland	2022	7	0
Total		12	0
