= Olivia Clark =

Welsh footballer (born 2001)

Personal information
- Full name: Olivia Lauren Clark
- Date of birth: 30 August 2001 (age 25)
- Place of birth: Lincoln, England
- Position: Goalkeeper

Team information
- Current team: Leicester City
- Number: 1

Senior career*
Years	Team	Apps	(Gls)
2016–2018	Boston United	-	(-)
2018–2019	Nettleham	16	(0)
2019–2020	Huddersfield	8	(0)
2020–2022	Coventry United	13	(0)
2022–2024	Bristol City	7	(0)
2023	→ Watford (loan)	5	(0)
2024–2025	FC Twente	7	(0)
2025–	Leicester City	7	(0)

International career^{‡}
2017–	Wales	35	(0)
- * Club domestic league appearances and goals as of 27 September 2026 ‡ National team caps and goals as of 3 March 2026

Olivia Lauren Clark (born 30 August 2001) is a professional footballer who plays as a goalkeeper for Women's Super League 2 club Leicester City and the Wales national team.

A product of the Lincolnshire FA Centre of Excellence, Clark got her first taste of senior football at Boston United in 2016, where she played for two seasons in the Lincolnshire County Women's League during which time she got her initial call-up for international duty with Wales. In May 2024, Clark began writing a column on the BBC Sport website.

== Club career ==
=== FC Twente ===
Clark signed a two-year contract with Dutch club FC Twente in August 2024. Her reasons for the move included Bristol City's recent demotion and the chance to play in the UEFA Women's Champions League.

Clark made her competitive debut for Twente in the 2024 Dutch Women's Super Cup on 31 August, in a 6–1 victory at home over Ajax. Several days later, on 4 September, Clark made her Champions League debut in the qualifying rounds, in a 7–0 win against the Wales champions Cardiff City. She also started in Twente's 5–0 shutout of Icelandic club Valur.

=== Leicester City ===
After six months at Twente, Clark signed for WSL club Leicester City on 24 January 2025. This was due to her not getting regular playing time at Twente.

== International career ==
Despite being born in England, Clark was eligible to play for Wales through her maternal grandfather. She entered Wales Under-17s trials and the coaches invited her to train with the senior side due to being impressed with her abilities. Clark made her senior international debut for Wales in 2021 against the Scotland women's national football team. In 2025, she was selected as a part of Wales' UEFA Women's Euro 2025 squad. This was after she was Wales' goalkeeper for their play off victory against the Republic of Ireland women's national football team. Clark played in two of the three matches which Wales played at Euro 2025. Clark has 30 caps for Wales.

== Career statistics ==
As of match played 27 September 2026

Appearances and goals by club, season and competition
Club	Season	League			National cup (Note: Includes the Women's FA Cup)		League cup (Note: Includes the WSL Cup/Women's League Cup, FA Women's National League Cup and Dutch Women's Super Cup)		Europe		Total	
Club	Season	Division	Apps	Goals	Apps	Goals	Apps	Goals	Apps	Goals	Apps	Goals
Nettleham	2018–19	WNL D1 Midlands	16	0	2	0	1	0	—		19	0
Huddersfield Town	2019–20	Women's National League North	8	0	3	0	2	0	—		13	0
Coventry United	2020–21	Championship	3	0	0	0	1	0	—		4	0
Coventry United	2021–22	Championship	10	0	1	0	2	0	—		13	0
Coventry United	Total		13	0	1	0	3	0	0	0	17	0
Bristol City	2022–23	Championship	0	0	0	0	4	0	—		4	0
Bristol City	2023–24	Women's Super League	7	0	0	0	1	0	—		8	0
Bristol City	Total		7	0	0	0	5	0	0	0	12	0
Watford (loan)	2023–24	Championship	6	0	0	0	0	0	—		6	0
FC Twente	2024–25	Vrouwen Eredivisie	7	0	—		1	0	9	0	17	0
Leicester City	2024–25	Women's Super League	0	0	1	0	0	0	—		1	0
Leicester City	2025–26	Women's Super League	6	0	0	0	3	0	—		9	0
Leicester City	2026–27	Women's Super League 2	1	0	0	0	0	0	—		1	0
Leicester City	Total		7	0	1	0	3	0	—		11	0
Career total			64	0	7	0	15	0	9	0	95	0

== International appearances ==
As of matches played 3 March 2026. Statistics from the Football Association of Wales

Appearances and goals by national team and year
National team	Year	Apps	Goals
Wales	2021	2	0
Wales	2022	3	0
Wales	2023	9	0
Wales	2024	10	0
Wales	2025	10	0
Wales	2026	1	0
Total		35	0

== Honours ==
Bristol City

- Championship: 2022–23

Twente

- Dutch Women's Super Cup: 2024
