= Katie Keane (footballer) =

Irish footballer (born 2006)

Personal information
- Full name: Katie Sarah Keane
- Date of birth: 27 July 2006 (age 20)
- Place of birth: Ratoath, County Meath, Ireland
- Height: 1.68 m (5 ft 6 in)
- Position: Goalkeeper

Team information
- Current team: Leicester City
- Number: 16

Youth career
- 2022–2023: Shelbourne

Senior career*
Years	Team	Apps	(Gls)
2022–2023	Shelbourne	2	(0)
2023–2024	Athlone Town	26	(0)
2025	Shamrock Rovers	9	(0)
2025–	Leicester City	11	(0)
2025	→ Sheffield United (loan)	1	(0)

International career^{‡}
2022	Republic of Ireland U17	3	(0)
2022–2024	Republic of Ireland U19	13	(0)
- * Club domestic league appearances and goals as of 15 November 2026 ‡ National team caps and goals as of 4 May 2026

Katie Sarah Keane (born 27 July 2006) is an Irish professional footballer who plays as a goalkeeper for Women's Super League 2 club Leicester City and the Republic of Ireland national team.

Keane played youth football with Shelbourne where she would start her career. She would also spend time with fellow League of Ireland Women's Premier Division clubs, Athlone Town and Shamrock Rovers. She has also spent time on loan with Sheffield United.

== Early life ==
Keane was born in Ratoath, County Meath. She played as a goalkeeper for Gaelic football side Skryne, from U8 to U15 level.

== Youth career ==
Keane signed for Shelbourne in 2022, playing in the U17 squad that won the league and cup double.

== Club career ==
=== Shelbourne ===
Ahead of the 2023 season Keane was included in the Shelbourne squad for the upcoming league season. On 20 May 2023 Keane made her Shelbourne debut at the age of 16 in a 6–0 away win against Sligo Rovers at The Showgrounds.

=== Athlone Town ===
On 2 August 2023, Keane signed for fellow League of Ireland Women's Premier Division club Athlone Town.

On 19 November 2023, Keane started as Athlone defeated her former club, Shelbourne in the FAI Cup final on penalties following a 2–2 draw at Tallaght Stadium.

In the 2024 season, Keane was Athlone Town's starting keeper as they won the league for the first time in the club's history. That same season the club would also make another FAI Cup final against Shelbourne at Tallaght Stadium. However, on this occasion Athlone would lose the final 1–6.

=== Shamrock Rovers ===
Ahead of the 2025 season, Keane signed for League of Ireland Women's Premier Division side Shamrock Rovers. During her time at the club she was competing with Amanda Budden for a starting spot.

=== Leicester City ===
On 4 August 2025, it was announced that Keane had signed for Women's Super League club Leicester City on a three-year deal.

She made her debut as a half-time substitute against Arsenal in the WSL in a 7–0 defeat.

==== Sheffield United (loan) ====
On 24 September 2025, Keane was signed by Women's Super League 2 club Sheffield United on an emergency 7 day loan as a result of injuries to the club's goalkeepers, Sian Rogers and Charlotte Parker-Smith.

On 24 September, Keane made her first appearance for the club against Durham in the Women's League Cup. Keane would prove crucial as United would go on to win the game on penalties with Keane saving two penalties during the shoot-out.

== International career ==
=== Youth ===
Keane has represented the Republic of Ireland U17s and the Republic of Ireland U19s.

Keane was in the Republic of Ireland U19 squad for the 2024 UEFA Women's Under-19 Championship. She played in all three of Ireland's games at the tournament as they were knocked out in the group stage.

=== Senior ===
On 4 November 2022, Keane was called up to the Republic of Ireland national team for a friendly against Morocco, at the age of just 16.

== Career statistics ==
=== Club ===
As of match played 18 November 2026

Appearances and goals by club, season and competition
Club	Season	League			National cup (Note: Includes FAI Women's Cup, Women's FA Cup)		League cup (Note: Includes Women's League Cup)		Continental		Other		Total	
Club	Season	Division	Apps	Goals	Apps	Goals	Apps	Goals	Apps	Goals	Apps	Goals	Apps	Goals
Shelbourne	2022	LOI Premier Division	0	0	0	0	—		0 (Note: Appearances in the UEFA Women's Champions League)	0	0	0	0	0
Shelbourne	2023	LOI Premier Division	2	0	0	0	—		—		1 (Note: Appearance(s) in All-Island Cup)	0	3	0
Shelbourne	Total		2	0	0	0	0	0	0	0	1	0	3	0
Athlone Town	2023	LOI Premier Division	6	0	4	0	—		—		0	0	10	0
Athlone Town	2024	LOI Premier Division	20	0	3	0	—		—		5 (Note: 4 Appearances in the All-Island Cup 1 Appearance in the Women’s President’s Cup)	0	28	0
Athlone Town	Total		26	0	7	0	0	0	0	0	5	0	38	0
Shamrock Rovers	2025	LOI Premier Division	9	0	0	0	—		—		1	0	10	0
Leicester City	2025–26	WSL	4	0	0	0	0	0	—		—		4	0
Leicester City	2026–27	WSL	7	0	0	0	4	0	—		—		11	0
Leicester City	Total		11	0	0	0	4	0	—		—		15	0
Sheffield United (loan)	2025–26	WSL2	1	0	—		1	0	—		—		2	0
Career total			49	0	7	0	5	0	0	0	7	0	68	0

== Honours ==
Athlone Town

- LOI Women's Premier Division: 2024
- FAI Women's Cup: 2023
