= Alisha Lehmann =

Swiss footballer (born 1999)

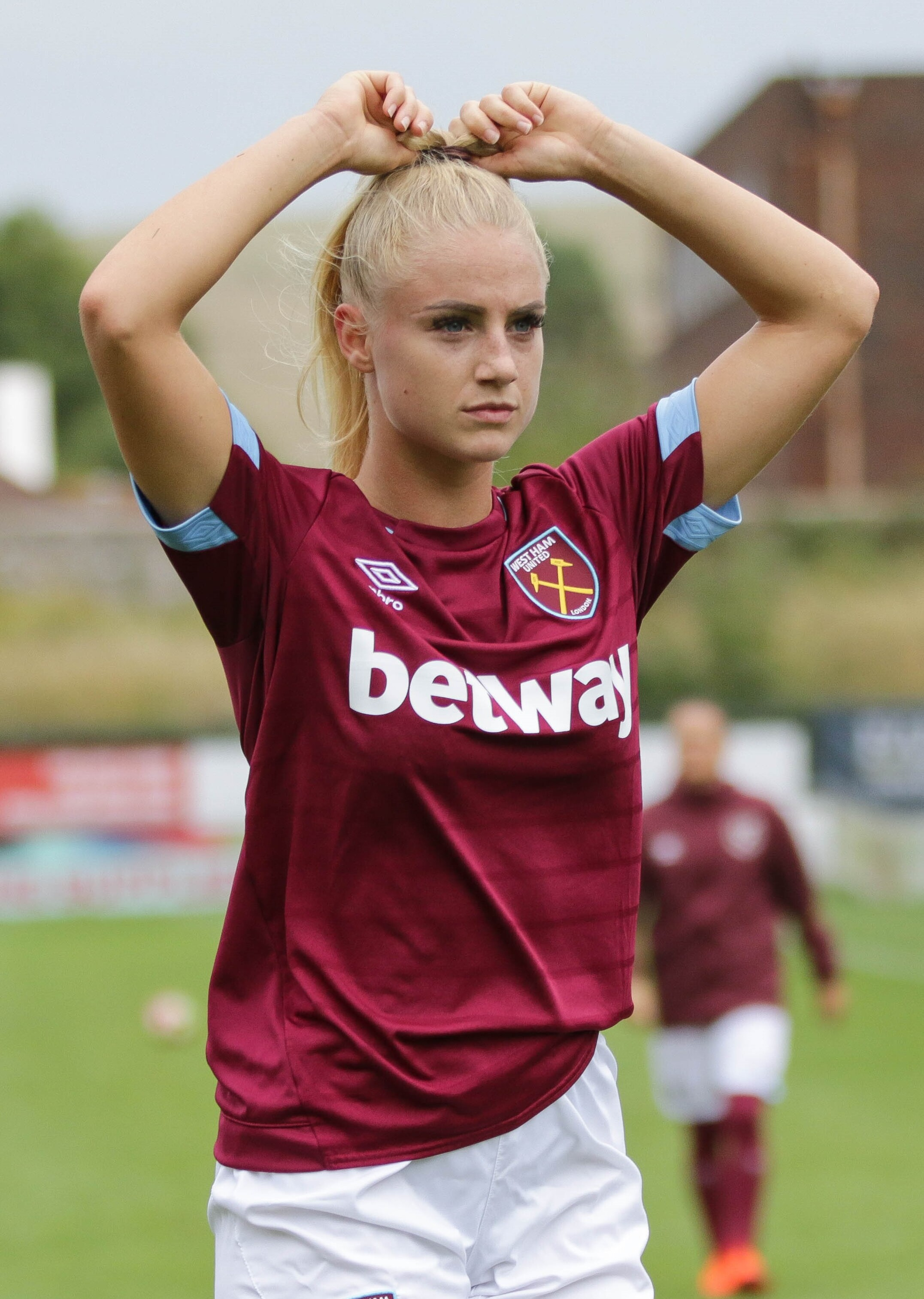
- Lehmann with West Ham United in 2018

Personal information
- Full name: Alisha Debora Lehmann
- Date of birth: 21 January 1999 (age 27)
- Place of birth: Tägertschi, Switzerland
- Height: 1.65 m (5 ft 5 in)
- Position: Forward

Team information
- Current team: Leicester City
- Number: 7

Youth career
- 2008–2011: FC Konolfingen
- 2011–2016: BSC YB Frauen

Senior career*
Years	Team	Apps	(Gls)
2016–2018	BSC YB Frauen	52	(25)
2018–2021	West Ham United	42	(9)
2021	→ Everton (loan)	8	(1)
2021–2024	Aston Villa	58	(9)
2024–2025	Juventus	16	(2)
2025–2026	Como	6	(0)
2026–	Leicester City	17	(2)

International career^{‡}
2015–2016	Switzerland U17	19	(6)
2016–2018	Switzerland U19	21	(9)
2017–	Switzerland	69	(11)
- * Club domestic league appearances and goals as of 15 November 2026 ‡ National team caps and goals as of 14 October 2026

Alisha Debora Lehmann (born 21 January 1999) is a Swiss professional footballer who plays as a forward for Women's Super League 2 club Leicester City and the Switzerland national team.

== Club career ==
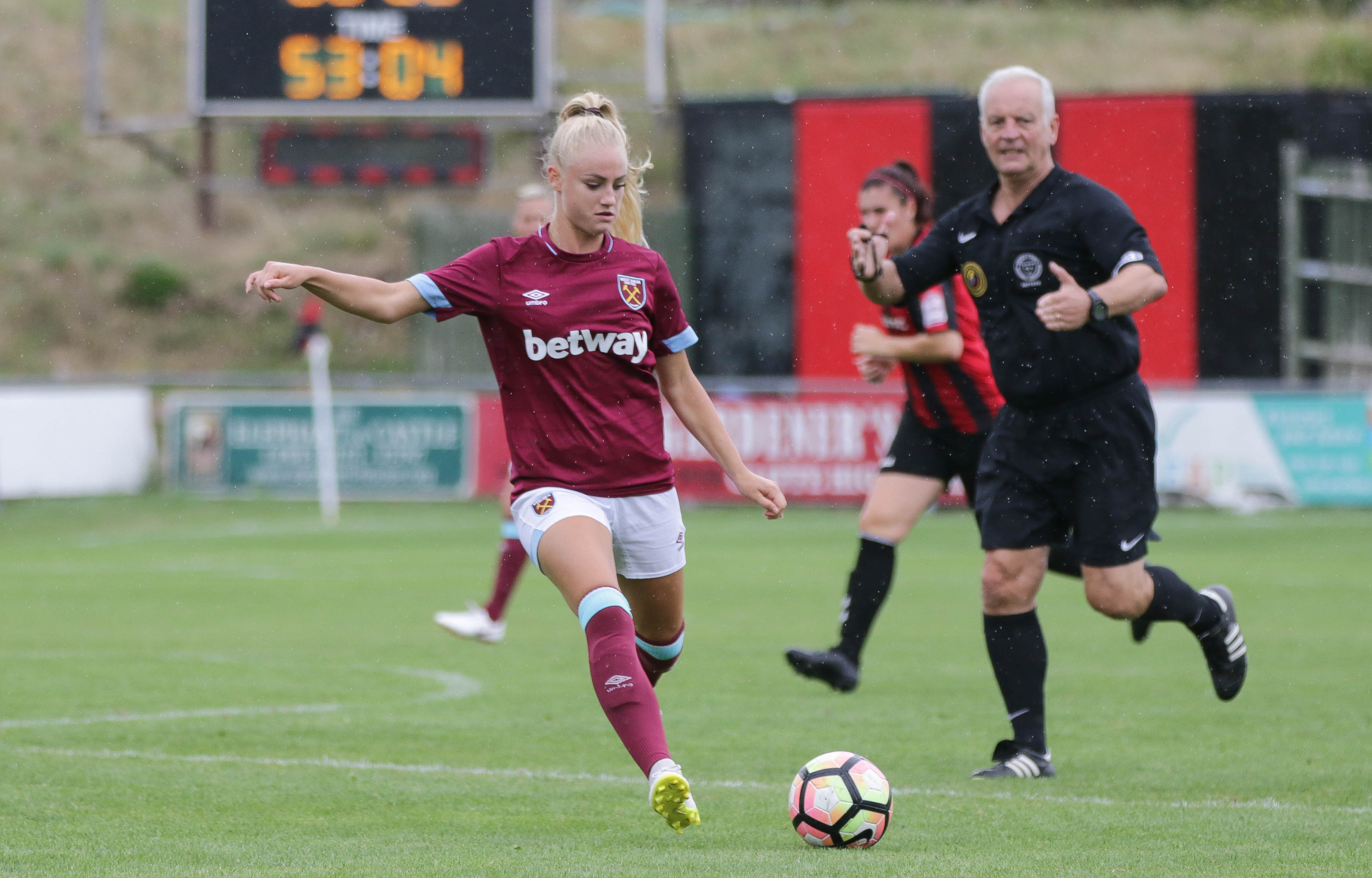
Lehmann with West Ham United in 2018

=== BSC YB Frauen ===
After beginning her career at age nine with FC Konolfingen, where she played from 2008 to 2011, Lehmann joined the U14 BSC YB team as a 12-year-old. She also trained with the U13 to U15 boys' teams three times a week and played in two matches on the male junior teams.

Lehmann started her senior professional career at Swiss club BSC YB at age 17. In her first season, she scored a hat-trick in a 3–0 win against FC Staad. She was top scorer for her team that season with nine goals. She went on to score 25 goals in 52 league appearances during her time at the club.

=== West Ham United ===
Newly-professional FA Women's Super League club West Ham United signed Lehmann from BSC YB Frauen in August 2018. It was reported that West Ham manager Matt Beard had been impressed by Lehmann's performances at the 2018 U-19 European Championship, which Switzerland hosted.

Lehmann scored both goals in a 2–1 win over Reading on 20 February 2019. In April 2019 West Ham extended Lehmann's contract after she scored nine goals in 30 appearances in all competitions and helped the club reach the FA Cup final by scoring the equalising goal in the semi-final match against Reading on 14 April 2019.

On 3 November 2019, Lehmann scored in the 75th minute against Reading for a 1–0 win that helped her team advance to the knockout stage of the 2019–20 Conti Cup. On 19 January 2020, when West Ham was behind 1–0 to Brighton, Lehmann scored two goals in the 80th and 83rd minute to give her team a 2–1 victory. She was shortlisted for the BBC Super League Young Player of the Season award for the 2019–20 season.

=== Everton (loan) ===
On 27 January 2021, it was announced that Lehmann had moved to Everton on loan until the end of the season. She earned her first start for the team on 14 February against Reading. She scored her first goal on 11 March against Birmingham City.

=== Aston Villa ===
Lehmann then joined Aston Villa for the 2021–22 season. She scored her first two goals for Aston Villa on 2 December 2021 against Sunderland. In the match against Leicester City on 23 January 2023, the score was 1–1 until Lehmann scored a winner in the 93rd minute. She was named Women's Supporters' Player of the Season for 2021–22.

In July 2022, she signed a one-year contract extension with Aston Villa for the 2022–23 season, having made 23 appearances and scoring four goals during her first season at the club.

On 26 March 2023, she made two goals and an assist in a 5–0 win against Leicester City. In this game she completed 100 percent of her dribbles and earned Player of the Match. At the end of the 2022–23 season, having made 54 appearances for Aston Villa, Lehmann extended her contract until June 2026, with the option of extending for a further year after that date.

In the final away game of the 2023–24 season, Lehmann scored in the 1–0 victory against Brighton & Hove Albion and was awarded Player of the Match.

=== Juventus ===
On 6 July 2024, Lehmann joined Italian side Juventus by signing a contract until 2027. She scored her first goal with the club on her debut in the opening match of the 2024–25 Serie A season against Sassuolo. She became the first Swiss player to score for the club. She was part of the squad which finished as champions in the 2024-25 Serie A season.

=== Como ===
After a single season with Juventus, Lehmann joined fellow Serie A side Como on 12 August 2025. She signed a three-year contract until June 2028. In the pre-season match against Inter Milan, Lehmann scored her first goal for the club, winning the game 1–0. She enacted her "fishing" celebration, for which she is known.

=== Leicester City ===
On 22 January 2026, Lehmann joined Leicester City on a two and a half year contract. Speaking about her return to the WSL after playing in Italy, she said "I learned a lot and played with some great players, but England is my home so I'm happy to be back." She scored her first goal for Leicester on 22 March 2026, netting the opening goal in a 2–1 loss against Aston Villa.

== International career ==
=== Youth ===
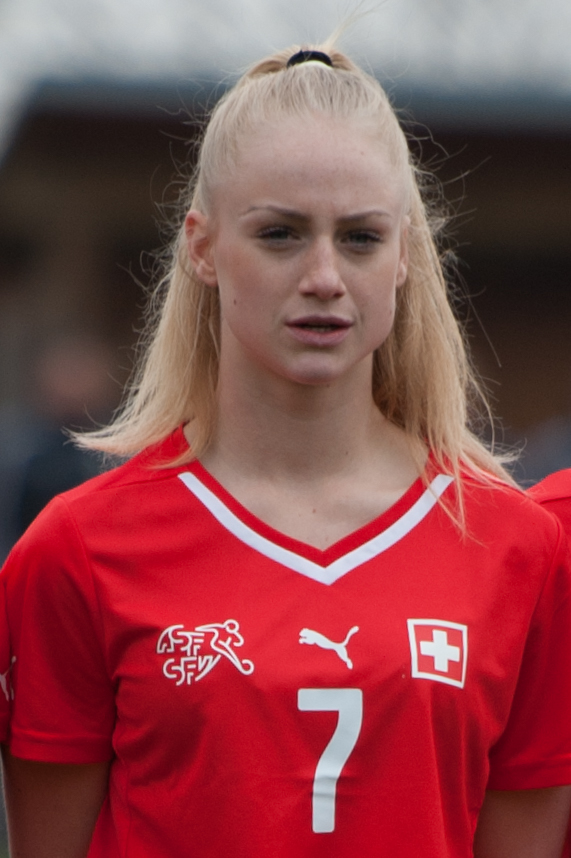
Lehmann with Swiss U-17 national team in 2016

Lehmann made her debut for the Swiss U-17 national team on 11 April 2015, defeating Serbia 8–1 during the elite qualifying round of the 2015 U-17 European Championship. She scored her first goal five days later, sealing the score with opponents Finland at 4–0 in the 61st minute. In the final tournament, she played in five out of six games. She scored the goal in a 1–0 win against the Republic of Ireland and helped her team finish first in their group. Switzerland reached the final but lost 5–2 to Spain.

Lehmann was called up by Monica Di Fonzo for the 2016 U-17 European Championship qualifiers, where she played all three preliminary phase matches, scoring against both Serbia and Lithuania, and all of the next three elite phase matches, where Switzerland was eliminated.

Selected by coach Nora Häuptle for the qualifying phases of the 2017 U-19 European Championship, Lehmann made her U19 national team debut on 18 October 2016 against Estonia and scored her first U19 goal in this match. Lehmann then scored a hat-trick in the following match against Croatia, and another hat-trick in a 3–3 draw with Czechia. She played in all the remaining matches of the elite phase, but Switzerland did not qualify.

At the U-19 European Championship at home in Switzerland in July 2018, Lehmann scored the equalizer in the 80th minute making it 2–2 against France. After a 2–0 loss to Spain, she scored again in a 3–1 win over Norway. With a win, a draw, and a loss, the Swiss retired in the preliminary round. Lehmann played in all three games.

=== Senior ===
Lehmann won her first cap for the senior Switzerland national team on 22 October 2017 in a friendly against Japan, coming on as a substitute for Eseosa Aigbogun in the 55th minute. She scored her first international goal on 2 March 2018 against Finland at the 2018 Cyprus Cup. She played her first official international match on 5 April 2018 in a 1–0 victory over Scotland for qualification to the 2019 World Cup. In May 2019, she sustained an ankle injury during national camp training and underwent surgery.

Lehmann was part of the team that qualified for the 2022 UEFA European Championship. She scored a goal in a 2–1 victory against Belgium. In the final must-win match for Switzerland, Lehmann helped her team reach the Euros during the penalty shootout against Czechia when she stepped up as the third shooter and successfully made it 1–1. She was eventually not available for the 2022 Euros because she felt she was not "mentally ready" to be involved in the tournament. On 3 July 2023, she was selected for the 2023 World Cup. She played in two out of three group stage matches, coming on as a substitute both times. Switzerland were eliminated by eventual champions Spain in the Round of 16.

On 23 June 2025, Lehmann was called up to the Switzerland squad for the UEFA Euro 2025. In the group stage game against Finland, she was substituted in for Iman Beney in the 82nd minute. Switzerland advanced to the quarter-finals, where Lehmann came on for Beney again in the 90th minute, but the team lost 2–0 against eventual finalists Spain.

== Personal life ==
Lehmann is bisexual. She previously dated Swiss national teammate Ramona Bachmann, and Brazilian midfielder Douglas Luiz. In June 2026, she became engaged to English television personality and footballer Montel McKenzie.

== In popular culture ==
In 2019, Lehmann was featured in the BBC Three series Britain's Youngest Football Boss with her then girlfriend Ramona Bachmann.

As of 2025, she has more than 16 million followers on Instagram, making her the world's most-followed women's footballer. She has spoken about her frustration with the perception that she is overly-focused on social media to the detriment of her football, saying "People don't see the work that I put in. They think I just train and then go home to make TikToks - it's not true."

In November 2024, it was announced that she would manage one of the 12 teams in the upcoming Baller League UK, a six-a-side football league. She previously won the inaugural version in Germany with Streets United.

== Career statistics ==
=== Club ===
As of match played 18 November 2026

Appearances and goals by club, season and competition
Club	Season	League			National cup (Note: Includes Swiss Women's Cup, Women's FA Cup, Coppa Italia (women))		League cup (Note: Includes FA Women's League Cup)		Continental (Note: Includes UEFA Women's Champions League)		Other (Note: Includes Nationalliga A - Final round, 2025 Serie A Women's Cup)		Total	
Club	Season	Division	Apps	Goals	Apps	Goals	Apps	Goals	Apps	Goals	Apps	Goals	Apps	Goals
BSC YB Frauen	2015–16	Nationalliga A	6	1	0	0	—		—		6	5	12	6
BSC YB Frauen	2016–17	Nationalliga A	18	8	5	7	—		—		5	1	28	16
BSC YB Frauen	2017–18	Nationalliga A	28	16	3	7	—		—		—		31	23
BSC YB Frauen	Total		52	25	8	14	0	0	0	0	11	6	71	45
West Ham United	2018–19	Women's Super League	20	6	5	2	5	1	—		—		30	9
West Ham United	2019–20	Women's Super League	13	3	1	0	4	1	—		—		18	4
West Ham United	2020–21	Women's Super League	9	0	0	0	2	1	—		—		11	1
West Ham United	Total		42	9	6	2	11	3	0	0	0	0	59	14
Everton (loan)	2020–21	Women's Super League	8	1	1	0	0	0	—		—		9	1
Aston Villa	2021–22	Women's Super League	21	2	0	0	2	2	—		—		23	4
Aston Villa	2022–23	Women's Super League	22	5	4	1	5	0	—		—		31	6
Aston Villa	2023–24	Women's Super League	15	2	1	0	5	2	—		—		21	4
Aston Villa	Total		58	9	5	1	12	4	0	0	0	0	75	14
Juventus	2024–25	Serie A	16	2	4	0	—		2	0	0	0	22	2
Como	2025–26	Serie A	6	0	0	0	—		0	0	3	1	9	1
Leicester City	2025–26	Women's Super League	9	1	1	0	0	0	—		—		9	1
Leicester City	2026–27	Women's Super League 2	8	1	0	0	4	0	—		—		12	1
Leicester City	Total		17	2	0	0	4	0	0	0	0	0	21	2
Career total			199	48	24	17	27	7	2	0	14	7	266	79

=== International ===
As of match played 13 October 2026

Appearances and goals by national team and year
National team	Year	Apps	Goals
Switzerland	2017	1	0
Switzerland	2018	10	3
Switzerland	2019	8	0
Switzerland	2020	6	1
Switzerland	2021	6	2
Switzerland	2022	3	1
Switzerland	2023	14	0
Switzerland	2024	10	2
Switzerland	2025	7	1
Switzerland	2026	4	1
Total		69	11

Scores and results list Switzerland goal tally first, score column indicates score after each Lehmann goal.

List of international goals scored by Alisha Lehmann
No.	Date	Venue	Opponent	Score	Result	Competition	Ref.
1	2 March 2018	GSZ Stadium, Larnaca, Cyprus	Finland	1–0	4–0	2018 Cyprus Women's Cup	
2	5 October 2018	Den Dreef, Heverlee, Belgium	Belgium	1–1	2–2	2019 FIFA Women's World Cup qualifying	
3	5 October 2018	Den Dreef, Heverlee, Belgium	Belgium	2–2	2–2	2019 FIFA Women's World Cup qualifying	
4	22 September 2020	Stockhorn Arena, Thun, Switzerland	Belgium	2–0	2–1	UEFA Women's Euro 2022 qualifying	
5	17 September 2021	Stockhorn Arena, Thun, Switzerland	Lithuania	1–0	4–1	2023 FIFA Women's World Cup qualifying	
6	21 September 2021	Goffertstadion, Chișinău, Moldova	Moldova	6–0	6–0	2023 FIFA Women's World Cup qualifying	
7	20 February 2022	Marbella Football Center, Marbella, Spain	Northern Ireland	1–1	2–2	Friendly	
8	24 February 2024	Marbella Football Center, Marbella, Spain	Poland	4–1	4–1	Friendly	
9	31 May 2024	Tissot Arena, Biel/Bienne, Switzerland	Hungary	1–0	2–1	UEFA Women's Euro 2025 qualifying	
10	28 November 2025	Estadio Municipal de Chapín, Jerez de la Frontera, Spain	Belgium	1–1	1–2	Friendly	
11	7 March 2026	Centenary Stadium, Ta' Qali, Malta	Malta	1–0	4–1	2027 FIFA Women's World Cup qualification	

== Honours ==
West Ham United

- FA Cup runner-up: 2018–19

Juventus

- Serie A: 2024–25
- Coppa Italia: 2024–25

Switzerland U17

- UEFA Women's Under-17 Championship runner-up: 2015
