= Araya Dennis =

English footballer (born 2006)

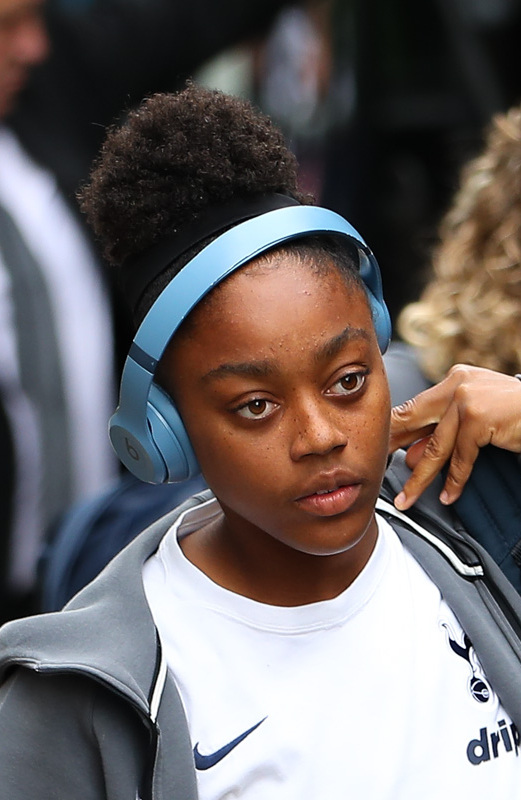
- Dennis with Tottenham Hotspur in 2024

Personal information
- Full name: Araya Marilyn Roxanne Dennis
- Date of birth: 11 January 2006 (age 20)
- Place of birth: London, England
- Position: Right winger

Team information
- Current team: Leicester City (on loan from Tottenham Hotspur)
- Number: 30

Youth career
- Arsenal

Senior career*
Years	Team	Apps	(Gls)
2022–2023	Arsenal	0	(0)
2023	→ Watford (dual reg)	3	(1)
2023–2024	→ Crystal Palace (dual reg)	20	(2)
2024–	Tottenham Hotspur	5	(0)
2025	→ Southampton (loan)	9	(0)
2026–	→ Leicester City (loan)	8	(1)

International career^{‡}
2022–2023	England U17	10	(0)
2023–2025	England U19	14	(3)
- * Club domestic league appearances and goals as of 15 November 2026 ‡ National team caps and goals as of 22:15, 21 June 2025 (UTC)

Araya Marilyn Roxanne Dennis (born 11 January 2006) is an English professional footballer who plays as a right winger for Women's Super League 2 club Leicester City, on loan from Women's Super League club Tottenham Hotspur. Dennis has represented England at international youth level.

A product of the Arsenal Academy, she previously played on loan for National League side Watford, as well as Women's Super League 2 sides Crystal Palace and Southampton F.C.

== Club career ==
=== Arsenal ===
Dennis is a product of the Arsenal Academy having scored 4 goals in 18 appearances for the academy team. She trained with the Arsenal first team prior to a two month spell with National League South side Watford, under dual registration for the 2022–23 season, where she featured in three games, scoring one goal.

==== Crystal Palace (loan) ====
On 2 September 2023, Dennis joined Women's Championship club Crystal Palace on dual registration for the 2023–24 season, and scored on her debut with the club the next day in a 2–1 win against Birmingham City. In October, she was awarded the Women's Championship Goal of the Month, for her long-range effort from 35-yards out against Charlton Athletic.

=== Tottenham Hotspur ===
In February 2024, having played at the 2nd and 3rd levels of women's football in England, Dennis signed a two-year contract with Women's Super League club Tottenham Hotspur in the top tier.

On 2 October 2024, she made her senior debut for Tottenham in the opening group stage match of the 2024–25 League Cup against Charlton Athletic, coming on as a 67 minute substitute. On 11 December, aged 18, Dennis scored her debut goal for the club in a 2–0 victory over Crystal Palace in the final group stage match, helping Tottenham to secure a place in the quarter-finals. Her performance was described as impressive by VAVEL and Spurs manager Robert Vilahamn.

On 5 February 2026, Dennis signed a new long term contract with the club.

==== Southampton (loan) ====
On 10 January 2025, Dennis joined Women's Championship club Southampton on loan for the remainder of the 2024–25 Women's Championship.

==== Leicester City (loan) ====
On 25 August 2026, Dennis joined Women's Super League 2 club Leicester City on a season-long loan.

== International career ==
Dennis was part of the England under-17 team that played in the 2023 U17 Championship up until the semi-finals in May, where the youth team were defeated 3–1 by Spain.

On 20 September 2023, she scored her youth international debut goals for the England under-19s, with a brace in a friendly fixture against Denmark resulting in a 5–0 victory.

In July 2024, Dennis featured in the 2024 UEFA Under-19 Championship for the under-19s, providing an assist for the final goal against Lithuania as a 70th minute substitute.

For 2025 U19 Championship qualification in November and December 2024, she featured as a defender in all first round matches against Turkey, Italy, and Poland.

== Style of play ==
Dennis is a winger who contributes across the pitch. At the age of 17 she was described by Imeptus Football as a young talent who "displays an intelligence of the game way beyond her young age"; with the ability to easily escape tight spaces, draw opposition, and run channels.

Crystal Palace described the forward as a fast-paced and "attack-minded right-sided player". For England at youth level, she has covered at left-back from the right-wing position, and played as a defender in the number 2 position.

== Honours ==
External video
- Women's Championship October 2023 Goal of the Month, from Women's Championship via X, 6 November 2023

Crystal Palace

- Women's Championship: 2023–24

Individual

- Women's Championship Goal of the Month: October 2023
