= Rick Passmoor =

English football manager (born 1967)

Personal information
- Full name: Richard Passmoor
- Date of birth: 11 September 1967 (age 59)
- Position: Centre-back

Team information
- Current team: Leicester City (manager)

Senior career*
Years	Team	Apps	(Gls)
- Sunderland
- Carlisle United
1984–1987	Scunthorpe United		

Managerial career
- 2007–2010: Leeds United
- 2013: Lincoln
- 2013–2017: Notts County
- 2022–2023: Leeds United
- 2023–2025: West Ham United (assistant)
- 2025: Leicester City (interim)
- 2025–: Leicester City
- * Club domestic league appearances and goals as of 02:44, 3 May 2026 (UTC)

Richard Passmoor (born 11 September 1967) is an English professional football coach and former player who is the manager of Women's Super League club Leicester City. He has previously managed Leeds United, Lincoln, and Notts County, as well as served on the coaching staff of West Ham United.

== Club career ==
Passmoor started his senior career with Sunderland. He then moved to Carlisle United, where his father had previously played. From 1984 to 1987, Passmoor closed out his playing career with Scunthorpe United, operating primarily as a centre-back. Passmoor also had gone on trials with the England youth national team program as a child.

== Managerial career ==
In 1999, Passmoor joined the coaching staff of Leeds United's men's team. Over the next eight years, he gained experience coaching in women's football and in youth football. He later earned the role of senior academy coach. Passmoor was promoted to manage Leeds United's women's senior team in 2007. The following year, he led Leeds United to the FA Cup final, where the team lost to Arsenal, 4–1. In 2010, Passmoor piloted Leeds to a FA Women's Premier League Cup title and was subsequently named the FA's Manager of the Year. He spent a total of four years as Leeds manager.

On 1 February 2013, Passmoor was hired as the manager of Lincoln Ladies. In his first competitive match at the helm, he guided Notts County to a 1–0 victory over Chelsea in the FA Cup; the following match, Passmoor piloted the team to a victory against his former club, Leeds United, to advance to the cup semifinals. He also led the team to the 2013 FA WSL Cup final later on in the year. At the end of his first season in charge, Passmoor helped the club avoid a brief scare of relegation and secure a berth in the following season of the FA WSL. From 2014 onwards, Passmoor managed Lincoln Ladies under the rebranded title of Notts County following a relocation to Nottingham. In 2015, he guided Notts County to another League Cup final, this time against Chelsea, which ended as a narrow defeat to the Women's Super League reigning titleholders.

Passmoor departed from Notts County after the 2017 season. In 2018, he returned to Scunthorpe United, where he had previously played in the 1980s. He rejoined the club as a Youth Development Manager before eventually reaching the position of Head of Academy Coaching and Coach Development.

Passmoor returned for a second stint with Leeds United in July 2022, now managing the club as a member of the FA Women's National League North. In his first season back at Leeds, he helped the team win the FA Women's National League Plate for the first time in club history. Passmoor also guided Leeds to the fourth round of the FA Cup, where they faced off against Arsenal.

On 4 September 2023, Passmoor was unveiled at WSL club West Ham United as one of Rehanne Skinner's assistant coaches ahead of the 2023–24 season. He spent two years at West Ham, contributing to WSL table finishes in 11th and 9th place. In September 2025, he left West Ham with 12 months remaining in his contract, opting to depart partially due to family-related reasons.

Following the sacking of Amandine Miquel, Leicester City hired Passmoor as interim head coach on 2 September 2025, ten days ahead of Leicester's season-opening WSL fixture. On 10 October 2025, Passmoor was hired permanently to manage the team for the next three years after starting the season with 2 wins and 3 draws.
