= Paulina Nyström =

Finnish footballer (born 2000)

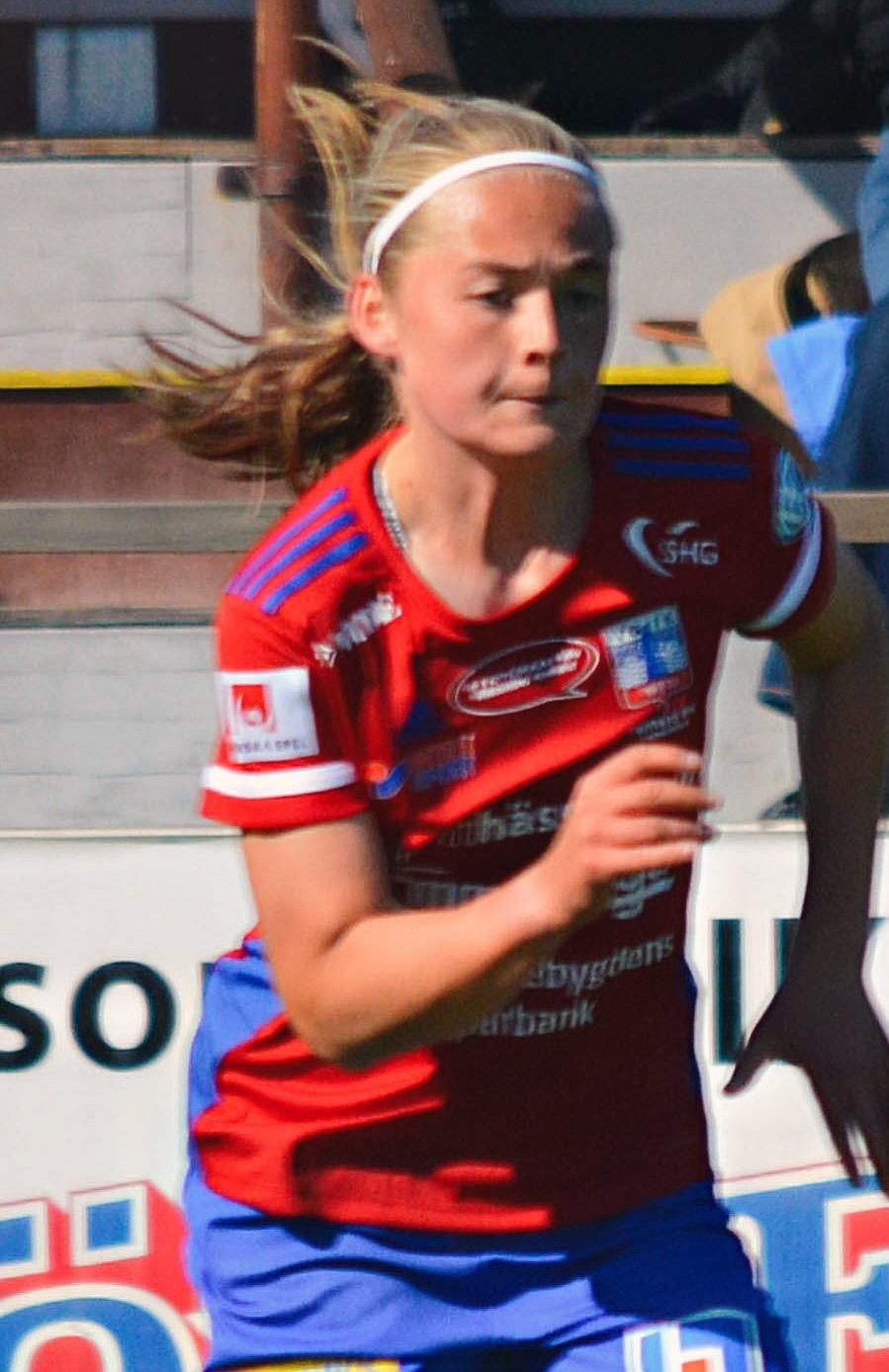
- Nyström with Vittsjö GIK in 2019

Personal information
- Full name: Paulina Tanya Nyström
- Date of birth: 17 August 2000 (age 26)
- Place of birth: Gothenburg, Sweden
- Height: 1.76 m (5 ft 9 in)
- Position: Forward

Team information
- Current team: Leicester City
- Number: 17

Senior career*
| Years | Team | Apps | (Gls) |
| 2015–2017 | Hovås Billdal IF | 39 | (6) |
| 2018 | Ljusdals IF | 26 | (8) |
| 2019–2021 | Vittsjö GIK | 42 | (1) |
| 2019 | → Lörby IF (loan) | 8 | (4) |
| 2021 | → Eskilstuna United (loan) | 10 | (2) |
| 2022–2023 | Eskilstuna United | 26 | (10) |
| 2023–2024 | Juventus | 25 | (4) |
| 2024–2026 | BK Häcken | 44 | (11) |
| 2026– | Leicester City | 8 | (2) |

International career^{‡}
| 2016 | Sweden U17 | 6 | (0) |
| 2017–2019 | Sweden U19 | 22 | (5) |
| 2020–2024 | Sweden U23 | 25 | (9) |
| 2025– | Finland | 6 | (1) |
- * Club domestic league appearances and goals as of 15 November 2026 ‡ National team caps and goals as of 9 June 2026

Paulina Tanya Nyström (born 17 August 2000) is a professional footballer who plays as a forward for Women's Super League 2 club Leicester City. Born in Sweden, and having played for Sweden at youth international levels, she plays for the senior Finland national team. Nyström previously played for BK Häcken, Juventus, Eskilstuna United DFF, and Vittsjö GIK.

== Early life ==
Nyström was born in Gothenburg, Sweden. She is half Finnish on her mother's side.

== Club career ==
=== Early career ===
Nyström started her career at Askims IK, and played in Sweden's regional leagues.

=== Vittsjö GIK, 2019–21 ===
In 2019, Nyström joined Vittsjö GIK in the Damallsvenskan, the top-tier league of Swedish women's football.

==== Loan to Lörby IF, 2019 ====
In 2019, Nyström was loaned to Lörby IF.

==== Loan to Eskilstuna United, 2021 ====
Nyström spent the 2021 season on loan at fellow Damallsvenskan club Eskilstuna United DFF.

=== Eskilstuna United, 2022–23 ===
Ahead of the 2022 season, Nyström joined Eskilstuna United on a permanent contract.

=== Juventus, 2023–24 ===
On 25 January 2023, Nyström signed with Serie A team Juventus on a contract through June 2025.

=== BK Häcken, 2024–26 ===
In July 2024, Nyström signed with BK Häcken on a contract until the end of 2027.

In 2025, Nyström was part of the team that won BK Häcken's first Damallsvenskan title since 2020 (when the side was known as Kopparbergs/Göteborg FC).

On 1 May 2026, Häcken became the inaugural champions of the Women's Europa Cup after defeating Hammarby in the final. The two-legged tie ended 4–2 on aggregate, marking Häcken's first European title in the women's game. On 8 August 2026, it was announced that Nyström would leave Häcken.

=== Leicester City, 2026– ===
On 14 August 2026, Nyström joined recently relegated Women's Super League 2 side Leicester City, signing a two-year contract with the club for an undisclosed fee. On 6 September 2026, Nyström made her competitive debut for Leicester City Women in the club's opening match of the Women's Super League 2 season. The match also marked her debut in English league football.

== International career ==
Nyström is a former youth international for Sweden.

On 15 October 2025, Nyström's request to switch international allegiance to Finland was approved by FIFA. On 19 November 2025, Nyström received her first call-up to the Finland national team for a training camp in Spain, where the side faced Austria and Belgium. She made her debut for the team on 27 November 2025 in a 1–1 draw between Finland and Austria. On 14 April 2026, Nyström scored her debut goal for the side in a World Cup qualifying match against Slovakia; Finland won the match 4–2.

== Personal life ==
Nyström is a dual-national of Finland and Sweden.

== Honors ==
BK Häcken

- Damallsvenskan: 2025
- UEFA Women's Europa Cup: 2025–26
