= Asmita Ale =

English footballer (born 2001)

Personal information
- Date of birth: 3 November 2001 (age 25)
- Place of birth: Dorset, England
- Height: 5 ft 7 in (1.70 m)
- Position: Defender

Team information
- Current team: Leicester City
- Number: 12

Youth career
- 2010–2018: Aston Villa

Senior career*
Years	Team	Apps	(Gls)
2018–2021	Aston Villa	50	(2)
2021–2024	Tottenham Hotspur	31	(1)
2024	→ Leicester City (loan)	6	(0)
2024–	Leicester City	47	(2)

International career^{‡}
2017–2018	England U17	13	(0)
2018	England U18	5	(0)
2019	England U19	4	(0)
- * Club domestic league appearances and goals as of 15 November 2026 ‡ National team caps and goals as of 20 November 2022

Asmita Ale (Nepali: अस्मिता आले, IPA: [ʌsˈmita ˈale]; born 3 November 2001) is an English professional footballer who plays as a defender for Women's Super League 2 club Leicester City.

During the 2023–24 season, Ale was the only footballer from Britain's South Asian (Nepali) community–male or female–to play top-division football in England.

== Career ==
The daughter of a former Gurkha soldier, she joined Aston Villa at the age of eight. She received her first professional contract after turning 18 in late 2019, becoming the first footballer of Nepalese origin to sign with a Women's Super League side.

On 26 May 2021, Ale won the Aston Villa Women's Players' Player of the 2020/21 Season award.

On 6 August 2021, Ale signed for Tottenham Hotspur F.C. Women on a contract until 2023. She is seen as one of the upcoming young talents in the Women's Super League. Ale made 17 appearances in all competitions for Tottenham during the 2022/23 season and kept clean sheets against Italy and Belgium. On 7 June 2024, Ale left Tottenham after her contract expired.

On 24 January 2024, Ale signed for Leicester City on loan until the end of the 2023/24 season.

On 17 July 2024, Ale signed for Leicester permanently, signing a three year contract.

== International career ==
Asmita Ale is eligible to represent two countries, England (where she was born) and Nepal (through her parents).

On 17 November 2021, Ale was called up to the England U23s for a match against Estonia.

On 2 November 2022, Ale was called up to the England U23s for matches against Netherlands and Italy.

On 29 November 2023, Ale was called up to the England U23s for matches against France and Spain.

== Career statistics ==
=== Club ===
As of match played 18 November 2026

Club	Season	League			FA Cup		League Cup		Total	
Club	Season		Apps	Goals	Apps	Goals	Apps	Goals	Apps	Goals
Aston Villa	2017–18	Women's Super League 2	3	0	?	?	0	0	3	0
Aston Villa	2018–19	Championship	17	2	?	?	2	0	19	2
Aston Villa	2019–20	Championship	12	0	1	0	5	0	18	0
Aston Villa	2020–21	Women's Super League	18	0	1	0	4	0	23	0
Aston Villa	Total		50	2	2	0	11	0	63	2
Tottenham Hotspur	2021–22	Women's Super League	13	1	1	0	4	1	18	2
Tottenham Hotspur	2022–23	Women's Super League	13	0	2	0	2	0	17	0
Tottenham Hotspur	2023–24	Women's Super League	5	0	0	0	3	1	8	1
Tottenham Hotspur	Total		31	1	3	0	9	2	43	3
Leicester City (loan)	2023–24	Women's Super League	6	0	2	0	0	0	8	0
Leicester City	2024–25	Women's Super League	18	0	2	0	3	0	23	0
Leicester City	2025–26	Women's Super League	22	0	1	0	3	1	26	1
Leicester City	2026–27	Women's Super League 2	8	2	0	0	4	0	12	2
Leicester City	Total		48	2	3	0	10	1	61	3
Career total			135	5	10	0	30	3	175	8
