= Olivia McLoughlin =

English footballer (born 2004)

Personal information
- Full name: Olivia McLoughlin
- Date of birth: 15 October 2004 (age 22)
- Place of birth: Solihull, England
- Positions: Midfielder; defender

Team information
- Current team: Leicester City
- Number: 24

Youth career
- Birmingham City
- 2020–2022: Aston Villa

Senior career*
Years	Team	Apps	(Gls)
2020–2024	Aston Villa	43	(0)
2023	→ Birmingham City (loan)	11	(1)
2024	→ Rangers (loan)	15	(1)
2024–2025	Rangers	20	(6)
2025–	Leicester City	24	(0)

International career^{‡}
2019	England U15	1	(0)
2020	England U16	1	(0)
2021–2023	England U19	17	(2)
2024–	England U23	6	(1)
- * Club domestic league appearances and goals as of 15 November 2026 ‡ National team caps and goals as of 22:46, 25 February 2025 (UTC)

Olivia McLoughlin (born 15 October 2004) is an English footballer who plays as a midfielder or defender for Women's Super League 2 club Leicester City and the England under-23 team. She previously played for Aston Villa and Birmingham City, and in Scotland for Rangers.

== Club career ==
=== Aston Villa ===
McLoughlin starting her career with Birmingham City, where she was named 2019–20 under-16 players' player of the year.

McLoughlin moved to city rivals Aston Villa in the summer of 2020. On 12 January 2021, it was announced that she had been promoted to the first team from the academy. She made her senior debut on 17 January as 65th-minute substitute, replacing Asmita Ale in a 7–0 loss to Manchester City in the Women's Super League (WSL).

On 17 October 2022, two days after her 18th birthday, McLoughlin signed her first fully professional contract with Aston Villa.

Following a short loan at Scottish club Rangers, McLoughlin departed the club at the end of her contract to sign a permanent contract with them.

=== Rangers ===
In January 2024, McLoughlin joined Rangers on a loan deal until the end of the season. Following a successful time, at the end of her contract with Aston Villa, she signed a two-year permanent contract with Rangers in June 2024.

=== Leicester City ===
McLoughlin left Rangers to return to the WSL in September 2025, signing a three-year contract with Leicester City.

== International career ==
McLoughlin has featured for the Under-15 and Under-16 England squads. On 20 October 2021, McLoughlin made her debut for the England U19s, in a 1–0 away victory over Republic of Ireland in a 2022 UEFA Women's Under-19 Championship qualification match.

On 5 October 2022, McLoughlin scored her first youth international goal for the under-19s, in a 5–0 victory over Slovenia.

In October 2024, McLoughlin was called up to the England under-23 squad for European League fixtures. On 29 October, as part of the starting eleven, she made her youth international debut in a 1–0 win over Portugal. She scored the final goal in a 3–0 win over Sweden to win the 2025–26 U23 European Competition title on 17 April 2026.

== Career statistics ==
=== Club ===
As of match played 27 May 2023.

Appearances and goals by club, season and competition
Club	Season	League			FA Cup		League Cup		Total	
Club	Season	Division	Apps	Goals	Apps	Goals	Apps	Goals	Apps	Goals
Aston Villa	2020–21	WSL	8	0	0	0	0	0	8	0
Aston Villa	2021–22	WSL	11	0	2	0	3	0	16	0
Aston Villa	2022–23	WSL	7	0	1	0	5	0	13	0
Aston Villa	Total		26	0	3	0	8	0	37	0
Birmingham City (loan)	2022–23	Championship	11	1	0	0	0	0	11	1
Career total			37	1	3	0	8	0	48	1
