= Emma Jansson =

Swedish footballer (born 1996)

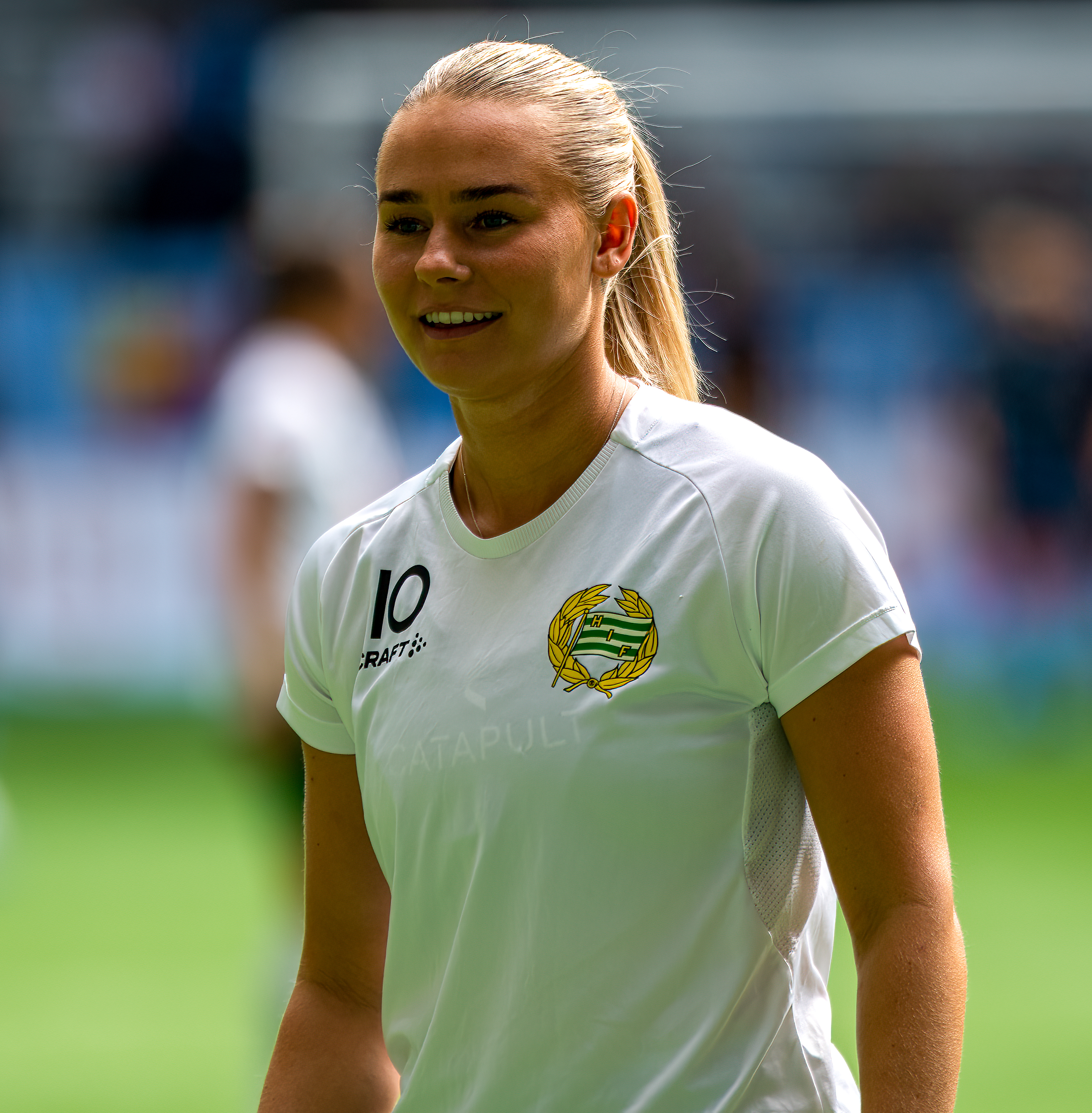
- Jansson with Hammarby, August 2022

Personal information
- Full name: Emma Jennifer Jansson
- Date of birth: 9 May 1996 (age 30)
- Place of birth: Sweden
- Position: Defender

Team information
- Current team: Leicester City
- Number: 8

Youth career
- IFK Sollentuna

Senior career*
Years	Team	Apps	(Gls)
2012–2015	Hammarby IF	68	(29)
2016	Eskilstuna United DFF	14	(0)
2017	KIF Orebro	20	(5)
2018–2022	Hammarby IF	116	(50)
2023–2025	FC Rosengård	63	(8)
2026–	Leicester City	10	(0)

International career^{‡}
2013–2015	Sweden U19	18	(3)
2016–2018	Sweden U23	8	(0)
- * Club domestic league appearances and goals as of 23 May 2026 ‡ National team caps and goals as of 16 January 2022

Emma Jansson (born 9 May 1996) is a Swedish footballer who plays as a forward for Leicester City in the Women's Super League 2. She has previously also represented Eskilstuna United and KIF Örebro DFF.

== Club career ==
Jansson started playing football in IFK Sollentuna. In the summer of 2012, she went to Hammarby IF. Jansson made her debut on 1 August 2012 in a 3–1 win over Vasalunds IF, where she was substituted at the end of the first half and also scored her first goal. She made her Allsvenskan debut in 2015 and played a total of four seasons in the club.

In November 2015, Jansson was signed by Eskilstuna United. She made her debut on 17 April 2016 in a 2–1 win over Djurgårdens IF.

In November 2016, Jansson was recruited by KIF Örebro, where she signed a two-year contract. KIF Örebro were relegated to Elitettan and after the 2017 season Jansson left the club.

Before the 2018 season, Jansson returned to Hammarby IF, where she signed a two-year contract. Jansson won the internal shooting league in 2018 with six goals scored and after the season she extended her contract by two years. In November 2020, Jansson extended his contract in Hammarby by two years.

In December 2022, Jansson was signed by FC Rosengård, where she signed a three-year contract.

On 5 January 2026, Jansson was announced at Leicester City on a two and a half year contract.

== National team career ==
Emma Jansson made her national team debut during the qualifying game for the U-19 European Championship. She was selected for the national team that played during the playoffs in Israel in 2015. Sweden took gold after defeating Spain 3–1 in the final.

== Honours ==
FC Rosengård

- Damallsvenskan: 2022, 2024
- Svenska Cupen: 2021–22

Sweden U19

Winner

- UEFA Women's Under-19 Championship: 2015
