= Janina Leitzig =

German footballer (born 1999)

- Leitzig in 2026 with Manchester United

Personal information
- Date of birth: 16 April 1999 (age 27)
- Place of birth: Wuppertal, Germany
- Height: 1.84 m (6 ft 0 in)
- Position: Goalkeeper

Team information
- Current team: Manchester United
- Number: 25

Youth career
- –2013: TuS Mingolsheim
- 2013–2016: TSG 1899 Hoffenheim

Senior career*
Years	Team	Apps	(Gls)
2015–2019	TSG 1899 Hoffenheim II	45	(0)
2018–2021	TSG 1899 Hoffenheim	25	(0)
2021–2023	FC Bayern Munich	14	(0)
2023	→ Leicester City (loan)	13	(0)
2023–2026	Leicester City	61	(0)
2026–	Manchester United	0	(0)

International career^{‡}
2016	Germany U17	2	(0)
2017	Germany U19	2	(0)
2017–2018	Germany U20	3	(0)
- * Club domestic league appearances and goals as of 16 April 2025 ‡ National team caps and goals as of 4 December 2021

Janina Leitzig (German: [jaˈniːna ˈlaɪtsɪç]; born 16 April 1999) is a German professional footballer who plays as a goalkeeper for Women's Super League club Manchester United.

== Career ==
=== TSG 1899 Hoffenheim ===
Leitzig made her league debut for TSG 1899 Hoffenheim II against FFC Frankfurt II on 30 August 2015.

Leitzig made her league debut for TSG 1899 Hoffenheim against Werder Bremen on 3 June 2018.

=== Bayern Munich ===
On 19 February 2021, Leitzig was announced at Bayern. She made her league debut against Carl Zeiss Jena on 21 November 2021.

=== Loan to Leicester City ===
In January 2023, she joined English club Leicester City on loan until the end of the 2022–23 Women's Super League season. She made her league debut against Brighton on 15 January 2023. On 31 May 2023, it was announced that Leitzig had won the Leicester Player of the Season.

=== Leicester City ===
On 7 July 2023, Leicester City announced they had signed Leitzig on a permanent deal. She made her league debut against Bristol City on 1 October 2023. On 1 March 2024, it was announced that Leitzig had suffered a shoulder injury.

=== Manchester United ===
In July 2026, Leitzig joined Manchester United for an undisclosed fee. She made her debut for the club on 23 September 2026 in a 10–1 WSL Players Cup match against Sheffield United.

== International career ==
Leitzig made her Germany U19 debut against Kosovo U19s on 12 September 2017.

== Career statistics ==
=== Club ===
As of match played 18 November 2026

Appearances and goals by club, season and competition
Club	Season	League			National cup (Note: Includes DFB-Pokal, Women's FA Cup)		League cup (Note: Includes FA Women's League Cup)		Continental (Note: Includes UEFA Women's Champions League)		Total	
Club	Season	Division	Apps	Goals	Apps	Goals	Apps	Goals	Apps	Goals	Apps	Goals
TSG Hoffenheim	2017–18	Frauen-Bundesliga	1	0	1	0	—		—		2	0
TSG Hoffenheim	2018–19	Frauen-Bundesliga	6	0	0	0	—		—		6	0
TSG Hoffenheim	2019–20	Frauen-Bundesliga	14	0	2	0	—		—		16	0
TSG Hoffenheim	2020–21	Frauen-Bundesliga	4	0	1	0	—		—		5	0
TSG Hoffenheim	Total		25	0	4	0	—		—		29	0
Bayern Munich	2021–22	Frauen-Bundesliga	14	0	4	0	—		4	0	22	0
Bayern Munich	2022–23	Frauen-Bundesliga	0	0	0	0	—		0	0	0	0
Bayern Munich	Total		14	0	4	0	—		4	0	22	0
Leicester City (loan)	2022–23	Women's Super League	13	0	1	0	0	0	—		14	0
Leicester City	2023–24	Women's Super League	14	0	1	0	3	0	—		18	0
Leicester City	2024–25	Women's Super League	20	0	1	0	1	0	—		22	0
Leicester City	2025–26	Women's Super League	14	0	1	0	0	0	—		15	0
Leicester City	Total		61	0	4	0	4	0	—		69	0
Manchester United	2026–27	Women's Super League	0	0	0	0	5	0	—		5	0
Career total			100	0	12	0	9	0	4	0	125	0

== Honours ==
Individual

- Leicester City Player of the Year: 2022–23
- Leicester City Players' Player of the Year: 2022–23
