= Heather Payne =

Irish footballer (born 2000)

Personal information
- Full name: Heather Margaret Payne
- Date of birth: 26 January 2000 (age 26)
- Place of birth: Ballinasloe, Ireland
- Height: 5 ft 7 in (1.70 m)
- Positions: Forward; midfielder

Team information
- Current team: Leicester City
- Number: 11

College career
Years	Team	Apps	(Gls)
2019–2023	Florida State Seminoles	60	(6)

Senior career*
Years	Team	Apps	(Gls)
2016–2018	Peamount United		(13)
2018–2019	Bristol City	9	(0)
2023–2025	Everton	33	(0)
2025–	Leicester City	17	(0)

International career^{‡}
2015–2017	Republic of Ireland U17	18	(3)
2018–2019	Republic of Ireland U19	6	(5)
2018–	Republic of Ireland	51	(2)
- * Club domestic league appearances and goals as of 8 November 2026 ‡ National team caps and goals as of 4 May 2026

Heather Margaret Payne (born 26 January 2000) is an Irish professional footballer who plays for Women's Super League 2 club Leicester City and the Republic of Ireland national team.

== Club career ==
After playing three seasons with Irish side Peamount United F.C. in the Irish Women's National League, Payne signed with Bristol City in the English first division, the FA WSL, in August 2018.

In August 2019, after a season with Bristol, Payne moved to the United States to take up a college scholarship with the Florida State Seminoles, who compete in Division I of the National Collegiate Athletic Association (NCAA) and the Atlantic Coast Conference (ACC).

On 25 August 2023, following 4 years in the American college system, Payne signed for England's women's top tier Women's Super League club Everton on a 2-year deal.

On 15 August 2025 Payne then signed for Women's Super League club Leicester City on a two-year deal.

== International ==
Payne was named to the Ireland senior squad for a 2019 FIFA Women's World Cup-qualifying match against Northern Ireland in August 2018. She made her debut for the team on 31 August 2018 playing as a wing-back.

=== International appearances ===
Appearances and goals by national team and year
National team	Year	Apps	Goals
Republic of Ireland	2017	1	0
Republic of Ireland	2018	3	0
Republic of Ireland	2019	6	0
Republic of Ireland	2020	4	0
Republic of Ireland	2021	8	1
Republic of Ireland	2022	8	0
Republic of Ireland	2023	12	0
Republic of Ireland	2024	7	0
Republic of Ireland	2025	2	0
Total		51	2

=== International goals ===
Scores and results list Republic of Ireland's goals first. Score column indicates score after each Payne goal. Updated as of 4 May 2026

International goals scored by Heather Payne
No.	Cap	Date	Venue	Opponent	Score	Result	Competition
1	17	11 June 2021	Laugardalsvöllur, Reykjavík, Iceland	Iceland	1–3	2–3	Friendly
2	42	5 December 2023	Windsor Park, Belfast	Northern Ireland	2-0	6-1	UEFA Nations League

== Honours ==
Florida State Seminoles

- NCAA Division I Women's Soccer Championship: 2021
