= Leicester City W.F.C. =

Women's association football club in England

- Full name: Leicester City Women Football Club
- Nickname: The Foxes
- Founded: 2004
- Ground: King Power Stadium, Leicester
- Capacity: 32,259
- Coordinates: 52°37′13″N 1°8′32″W
- Owner: King Power
- Chairman: Aiyawatt Srivaddhanaprabha
- Manager: Rick Passmoor
- League: Women's Super League 2
- 2025–26: WSL, 12th of 12 (relegated via play-offs)
- Website: lcfc.com/women
Home colours	Away colours	Third colours

Leicester City Women Football Club is an English professional women's football club based in Leicester, England. Founded in 2004 as an independent club, Leicester City Women were acquired in 2020 by Thai duty-free retailers King Power, the parent company of men's affiliate Leicester City. They currently compete in the Women's Super League 2, the second level of the English football pyramid.

Leicester City Women won promotion back into the FA Women's Premier League Northern Division in 2016 winning a record 22 games out of 22. After finishing third and second in the Northern Division in 2017 and 2018 respectively, Leicester City Women applied to take part in the inaugural FA Women's Championship season (2018–19). The Foxes had their bid accepted as announced by the Football Association in May 2018.

Leicester City Women also run a Reserves team and the Leicester City Women Development Centre. The development centre expanded at the beginning of the 2017/18 season and caters for under-9s, 10s, 11s, 12s, 13s 14s, 15s, 16s and 18s.

== History ==
=== Early years and success (2004–2013) ===
Founded in 2004, Leicester City Women achieved four successive promotions in their first four seasons, winning the Leicestershire County League, Unison East Midlands Southern League, Unison East Midlands Premier and Midland's Combination League to gain promotion into the FA Women's Premier League Northern Division (second tier) in 2008. Cup success also came early with Leicester winning their first of 7 consecutive Leicestershire & Rutland County FA Cup's in 2006, as well as winning their respective League Cup's in 2005, 2006 and 2007. Leicester also reached the Fifth Round of the 2007–08 Women's FA Cup before being beaten by top-tier side Everton.

The Foxes finished 5th in their first season in the Northern Division (Second Tier), then going on to finish third in the 2009–10 season before the newly created FA Women's Super League came into effect as the new top tier meant the FA Women's Premier League Northern Division became a third-tier league. Leicester had applied to join the FA Women's Super League in December 2009, but in March 2010 they were announced as a losing bidder for the inaugural season.

Leicester consolidated themselves in the third tier with two more back-to-back 3rd-place finishes in the 2010–11 and 2011–12 seasons, as well as maintaining their Leicestershire County Cup run of success, winning their 6th and 7th consecutive trophies in 2011 and 2012 respectively.

=== Up and down years (2013–2018) ===
Leicester City Women suffered their first on-pitch relegation in May 2013, finishing bottom of the FA Women's Premier League Northern Division having picked up just four points from 16 games. The club hired Stuart Wilson as Manager as they looked for an immediate return to the third tier. Unfortunately, the club lost out on promotion to Copsewood FC (Copsewood became Nuneaton Town Ladies before folding) Leicester City WFC did, however, regain the County Cup having lost in the final the previous season.

When Stuart Wilson left in the Summer of 2014, Reserves manager Jonathan Morgan stepped up to take charge of First Team affairs in a 'Management Trio' along with James and Ryan who also stepped up from the Reserves. Halfway through the season, with the club sitting second, but eight points behind the leaders Loughborough Foxes, chairman, and father of Jonathan, Rohan Morgan felt a change in Management was needed and Jonathan Morgan was given the sole responsibility whilst James and Ryan departed the club. Michael Makoni stepped up from the Reserves to become Jonathan's assistant. Leicester would finish the 2014–15 season in second place after a 3–3 draw with Loughborough Foxes and a 2–1 defeat to third-placed Leafield Athletic.

After a number of squad changes for the 2015–16 season, Leicester City WFC started brightly picking up three wins in August, scoring 20 goals and conceding just one. The Foxes continued their fine form through until Christmas, losing just once in the opening four months, a league cup match against Bradford City from the Division above. Despite being knocked out of the County Cup and FA Cup in successive weeks early in 2016, Leicester City WFC maintained their incredible 100% record in the league, winning the Midland Division and confirming promotion back to the Northern Division with a 10–0 win over Rotherham United Ladies. Leicester City WFC came from behind to win late on in a number of games that season, but their impressive 22 wins out of 22 games was confirmed on the final day of the season when Helen Busby netted in the 91st minute away to Wolves having been pegged back at 1–1 just a few minutes before.

Leicester enjoyed a largely successful first season back in the Northern Division, picking up some big wins throughout the season and ending their 3rd tier return in 3rd position, again their joint-highest finish in the Division. Leicester reached the County Cup final before losing 2–1 to Loughborough Foxes, they also reached the League Plate semi-final and the FA Cup fourth Round before narrow defeats in both stopped their progress.

Still under the stewardship of Jonathan Morgan and Michael Makoni, Leicester made a number of big signings in the Summer of 2017, picking up key players with experience in the Northern Division. The club finished second in the league, 10 points behind Blackburn Rovers, with Rosie Axten the top goalscorer for both the Club and the Northern Division. They also made it to the fifth Round of the FA Cup, reached the FA Women's Premier League Cup final and regained the County Cup.

=== FA Women's Championship (Tier 2) to FA Women's Super League (Tier 1) (2018–present) ===
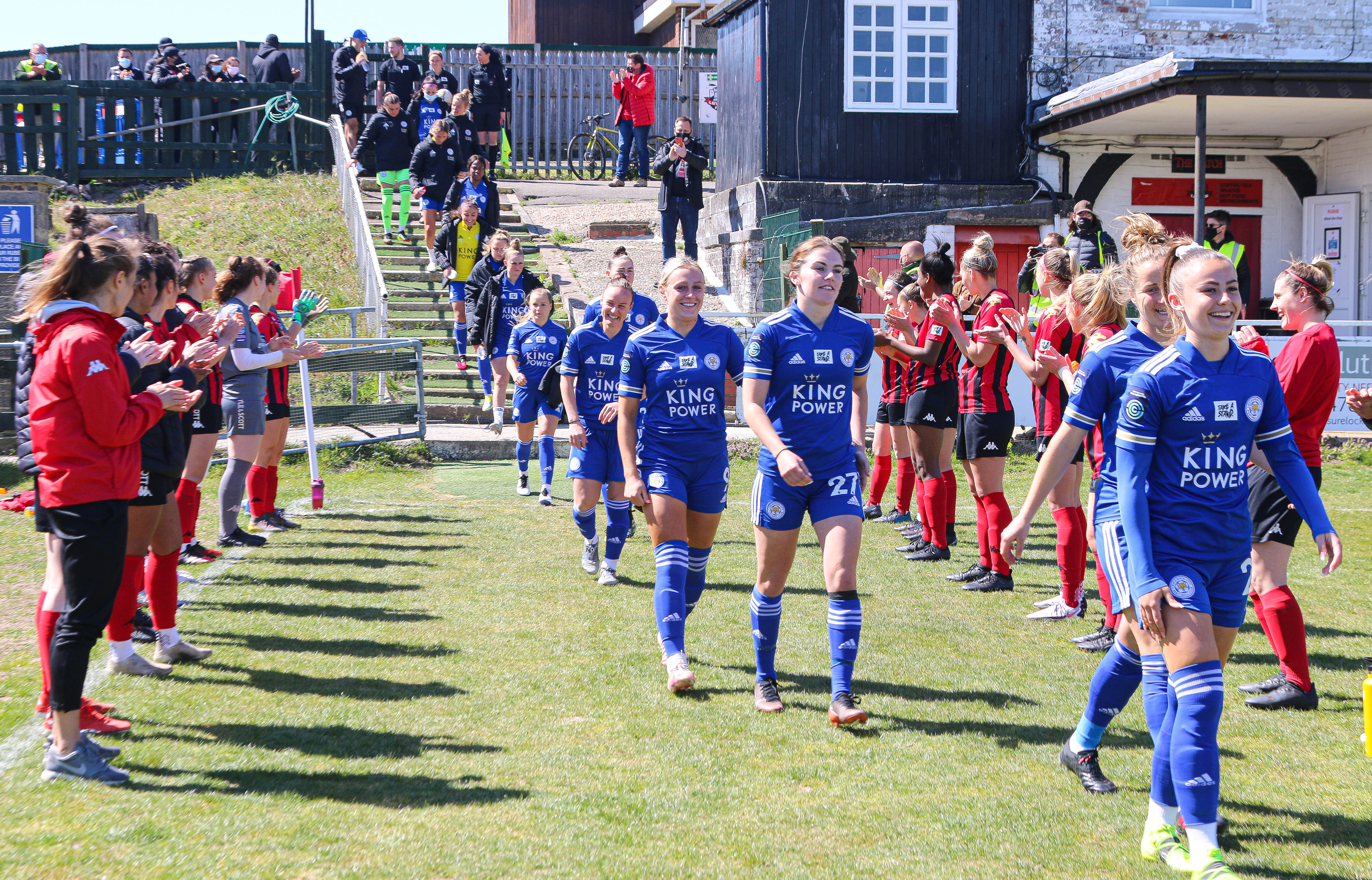
Leicester City given a guard of honour by Lewes after winning the 2020–21 FA Women's Championship

In May 2018, Leicester City Women were one of five new teams awarded a licence to join the FA Women's Championship following an extensive application process, securing a return to the second tier for the 2018–19 season after eight years away. Leicester opened their first campaign in the newly named FA Women's Championship with a 2–0 away victory against fellow newcomers Crystal Palace. The Foxes eventually going on to end their return to the second tier in 7th place.

Boosted by a host of new signing's, Leicester hoped to push on in the next campaign and after a stuttering start eventually found themselves with a 6th-place finish following a four-game unbeaten run in early 2020 before the COVID-19 pandemic shortened the 2019–20 season. Cup success did manage to return however with Leicester reaching the quarter-finals of the Women's FA Cup for the first time thanks to a 2–1 extra time victory over WSL opposition Reading set up a date with Manchester City for later in 2020.

On 22 August 2020, the club was bought by men's club Leicester City's parent company King Power, having previously been run as an independent club with an informal cooperation to the Foxes. The club became fully professional in the process. On 6 September 2020, the club played and won its first match as a "professional" outfit, starting their league campaign with a 3–0 victory over Blackburn Rovers thanks to goals from Charlie Devlin and new signing Natasha Flint. Despite being unable to best WSL side Manchester City in the 2019–20 Women's FA Cup quarter-final on 27 September 2020, the Foxes kept up their run of setting personal bests in cup competitions, reaching the semi-final of the 2020–21 FA Women's League Cup before falling to WSL side Bristol City. On 4 April 2021, the club won the Women's Championship after a 2–0 victory over London City Lionesses, sealing promotion to the FA Women's Super League in the process. On 12 May 2021, Leicester defeated Manchester United 3–2 in the fifth round of the 2020–21 Women's FA Cup, before losing a second consecutive quarter-final to Manchester City later in the year.

On 4 September 2021, Leicester City played their first FA Women's Super League and first tier fixture, losing 2–1 to Midlands rivals Aston Villa, having initially taken the lead through Flint. In September, former Leicester City men's and England striker Emile Heskey was appointed as an ambassador to the club. In October 2021 Heskey was then given the job role of Head of women's football development at the club replacing the outgoing, Russ Fraser. In November 2021 it was confirmed that then manager Jonathan Morgan had been relieved of his duties at the club and was replaced by Lydia Bedford. On 19 December 2021, Leicester picked up their first WSL victory, 2–0 at home to Birmingham City thanks to goals from Sophie Howard and Sam Tierney. As a result of the following upturn in form during the second half of the season, Leicester finished their debut top-flight campaign in 11th place, retaining their status.

In 2023–24, Leicester reached the FA Cup semi-finals for the first time after beating Liverpool in the quarter-finals. In the semi-final, Leicester lost 2–1 away to Tottenham Hotspur after extra time.

== Home stadium ==
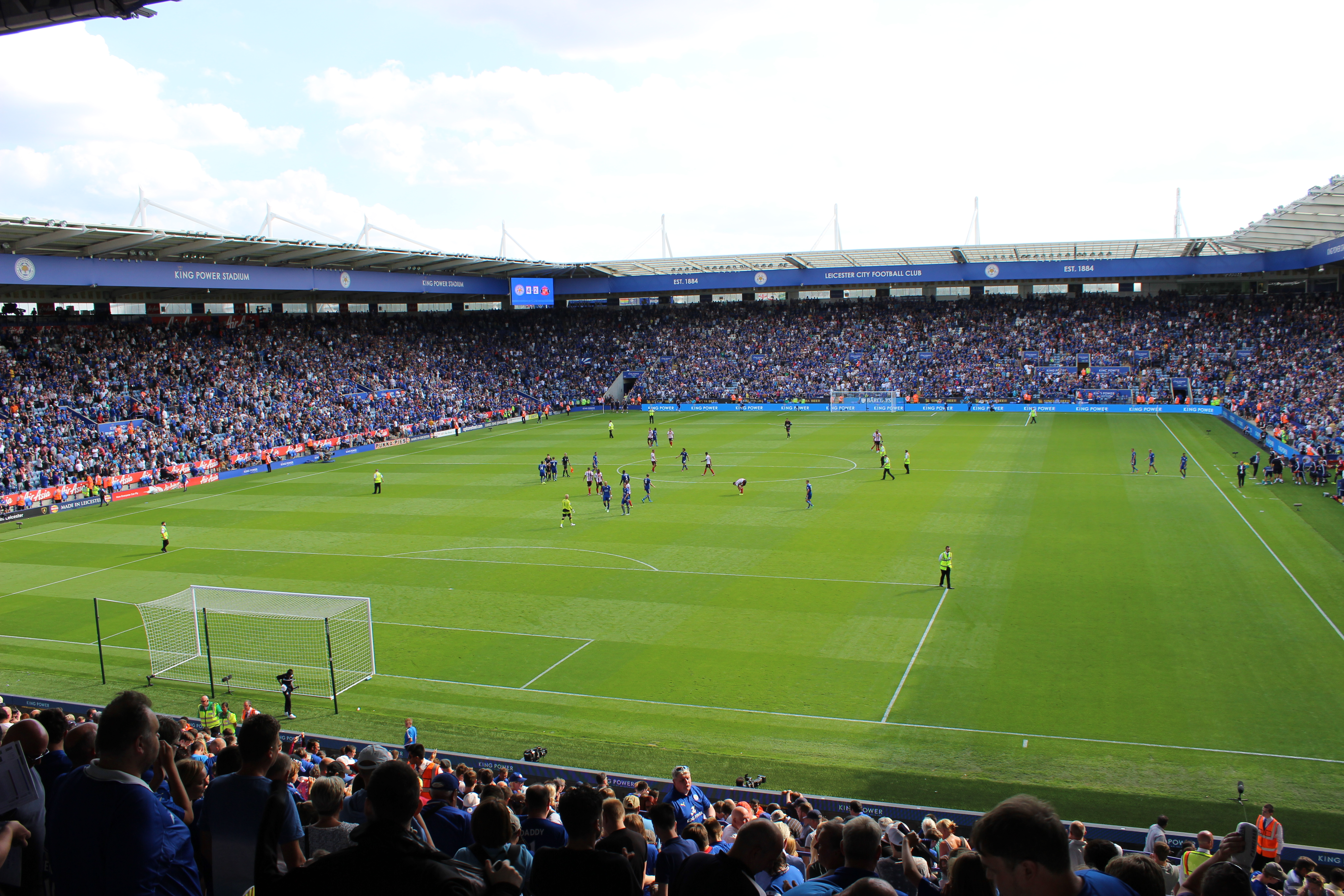
The King Power Stadium has been the club's main home stadium since 2021.

Leicester City Women play at King Power Stadium; Pirelli Stadium is their alternative venue when scheduling clashes with the men's team prevent playing at King Power Stadium.

Between 2017 and 2021, Leicester City Women played at Farley Way Stadium, home of Quorn FC. Up until 2017, they played at Riverside Pavilion in Leicester. Before moving to Riverside, Leicester City Women moved between grounds in different seasons, including Harborough Town's Bowden Park and Oadby Town's Freeway Park.

== Training ground ==
In January 2021 the men's teams were relocated to a new purpose-built training ground. The former Premier League team's facility at Belvoir Drive was then handed over to the women's teams for full-time use.

== Players ==
=== Current squad ===
As of 3 September 2026

Note: Flags indicate national team as defined under FIFA eligibility rules; some limited exceptions apply. Players may hold more than one non-FIFA nationality.

No.	Pos.	Nation	Player
1	GK	WAL	Olivia Clark
2	DF	ENG	Sarah Mayling
3	MF	ENG	Sam Tierney (captain)
4	DF	SCO	Leah Eddie
6	MF	USA	Celeste Boureille
7	FW	SUI	Alisha Lehmann
8	MF	SWE	Emma Jansson
9	FW	ENG	Poppy Pritchard
10	FW	ENG	Missy Goodwin
11	DF	IRL	Heather Payne
12	DF	ENG	Asmita Ale

No.	Pos.	Nation	Player
15	MF	ENG	Simone Sherwood
16	GK	IRL	Katie Keane
17	FW	FIN	Paulina Nyström
18	MF	SWE	Emilia Pelgander
19	FW	ENG	Denny Draper
22	DF	IRL	Jessie Stapleton
23	MF	ENG	Libby Bance
24	MF	ENG	Olivia McLoughlin
30	FW	ENG	Araya Dennis (on loan from Tottenham Hotspur)
31	MF	IRL	Jess Ziu

== Club staff ==
As of 3 October 2025

Directors & Senior Management
Role	Person
Chairman	(Thailand) Aiyawatt Srivaddhanaprabha
Vice Chairman	(Thailand) Apichet Srivaddhanaprabha
Chief Executive	(Thailand) Aiyawatt Srivaddhanaprabha
Director of Football	(England) Lee Billiard

As of 4 September 2026

Management Staff
Role	Person
Manager	(England) Rick Passmoor
Assistant Manager	(Republic of Ireland) Marie Hourihan
First Team Coach	(England) Jade Moore
Goalkeeping Coach	(England) Ollie Colebourne
Lead Physio	(England) Emma Sanders
Head of Performance	(England) Ollie Richardson
Performance Analyst	(England) Samuel Jones
Opposition Analyst	(England) Steph Puxty
Data Analyst	(England) Jay Binning
Kit Manager	(England) Tegan Hargreaves
Head of Academy	(England) Peter Wilson
Content Lead	(England) Matthew Temple

== Managers ==
Dates	Name	Refs
2004–2005	Craig White	
2006–2010	(England) Rehanne Skinner	
2013–2014	Stuart Wilson	
2014–2021	(England) Jonathan Morgan	
2021	(England) Emile Heskey (interim)	
2021–2022	(England) Lydia Bedford	
2022–2024	(Scotland) Willie Kirk	
2024	Jennifer Foster (interim)	
2024–2025	(France) Amandine Miquel	
2025–	(England) Rick Passmoor	

== Player statistics ==
=== Player of the Year ===
==== Supporters' Player of the Year ====
Leicester City's Supporters' Player of the Year award is voted for by the club's supporters at the end of every season.

Year	Winner	Refs
2020–21	(England) Natasha Flint	
2021–22	(England) Shannon O'Brien	
2022–23	(Germany) Janina Leitzig	

==== Players' Player of the Year ====
Leicester City's Players' Player of the Year award is voted for by the club's players at the end of every season.

Year	Winner	Refs
2020–21	(Nigeria) Ashleigh Plumptre	
2021–22	(England) Demi Lambourne	
2022–23	(Germany) Janina Leitzig	

=== Players with over 50 professional appearances for Leicester ===
As of 15 April 2024

Includes competitive appearances only from 22 August 2020 when the club turned professional. Current players in bold.

- (England) **Sam Tierney 105**
- (Scotland) Sophie Howard 96
- (Nigeria) Ashleigh Plumptre 75 (Note: Plumptre also featured 5 times for Leicester City before the club turned professional)
- (England) Natasha Flint 63
- (England) Shannon O'Brien 60
- (Netherlands) Esmee de Graaf 53
- (England) Aileen Whelan 52
- (England) **Missy Goodwin 51**

=== Players with over 10 professional goals for Leicester ===
As of 15 April 2024

Includes competitive goals only from 22 August 2020 when the club turned professional. Current players in bold.

- (England) Natasha Flint 25
- (England) **Sam Tierney 13**
- (Finland) Jutta Rantala 10

=== International honours ===
As of 10 April 2024. Only caps won and goals scored at Leicester included, current players in bold.

- (Scotland) Sophie Howard (30 Caps, 3 Goals)
- (Nigeria) Ashleigh Plumptre (11 Caps)
- (Finland) Jutta Rantala (10 Caps, 4 Goals)
- (New Zealand) CJ Bott (10 Caps, 2 Goals)
- (Belgium) Janice Cayman (9 Caps)
- (Australia) Courtney Nevin (9 Caps)
- (Canada) Deanne Rose (8 Caps, 1 Goal)
- (Wales) Hannah Cain (8 Caps, 1 Goal)
- (Wales) Josie Green (8 Caps)
- (Wales) Carrie Jones (7 Caps, 2 Goals)
- (Jamaica) Paige Bailey-Gayle (3 Caps)
- (Republic of Ireland) Ruesha Littlejohn (3 Caps)
- (Netherlands) Lize Kop (2 Caps)
- (Northern Ireland) Natalie Johnson (2 Caps)
- (Australia) Remy Siemsen (1 Cap)
- (Germany) Lena Petermann (1 Cap)

==== World Cup players ====
The following players were selected for the FIFA Women's World Cup whilst at Leicester.

- (Australia) Courtney Nevin (2023)
- (New Zealand) CJ Bott (2023)
- (Nigeria) Ashleigh Plumptre (2023) (Note: Plumptre was named in the Nigeria squad prior to departing Leicester City ahead of the competition in July 2023)

== Honours ==
League

- FA Women's Championship
  - Champions: 2020–21
- FA Women's Northern Division
  - Runners-up: 2017–18
- FA Women's Midlands Division One
  - Champions: 2015–16
  - Runners-up: 2014–15
- Midlands Combination League
  - Champions: 2007–08
  - Runners-up: 2013–14
- Unison East Midlands Premier
  - Champions: 2006–07
- Unison East Midlands Southern League
  - Champions: 2005–06
- Leicestershire County League
  - Champions: 2004–05

Cup

- FA Women's Premier League Cup
  - Runners-up: 2017–18
- Midland Combination League
  - Runners-up: 2007–08
- Unison East Midlands Premier League Cup
  - Winners: 2006–07
- Unison East Midlands Southern League Cup
  - Winners: 2005–06
- Leicestershire County League Cup
  - Winners: 2004–05
- Leicestershire & Rutland County FA Cup
  - Winners (9): 2017–18, 2013–14, 2011–12, 2010–11, 2009–10, 2008–09, 2007–08, 2006–07, 2005–06
  - Runners-up: 2016–17, 2012–13, 2004–05
