= Amandine Miquel =

French association football manager (born 1984)

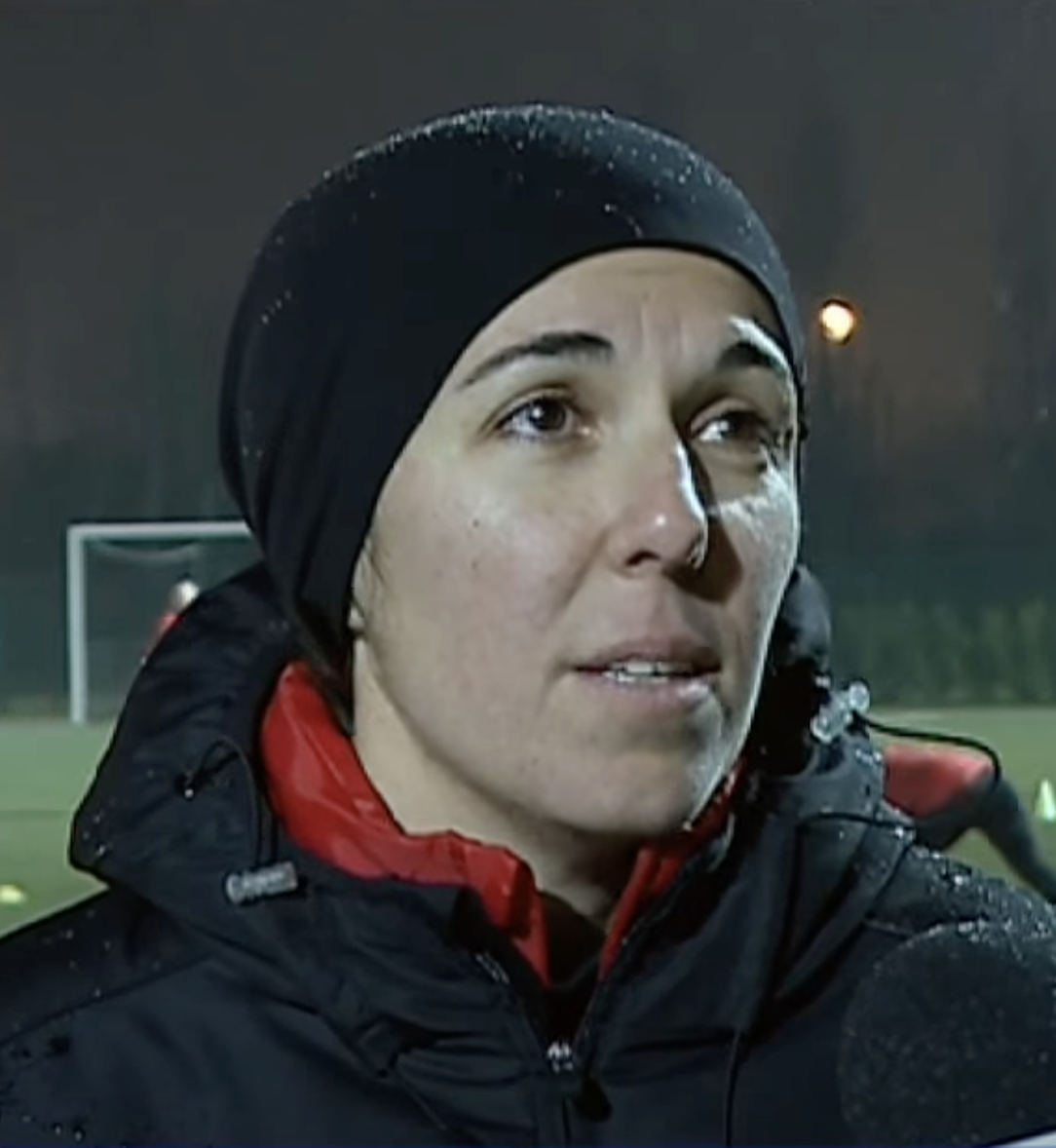

Personal information
- Date of birth: 8 April 1984 (age 42)
- Place of birth: France

Team information
- Current team: Monterrey (women) (Manager)

Managerial career
- Years: Team
- 2014–2015: Bergerac
- 2015–2016: Niort
- 2017–2024: Reims
- 2024–2025: Leicester City
- 2026–: Monterrey (women)

Amandine Miquel (French: [amɑ̃din mikɛl]; born 8 April 1984) is a French football manager who managed English Women's Super League club Leicester City until August 2025. Prior to Leicester she had managed several French clubs, notably Reims for seven years.

== Early life ==
Miquel started playing football at a young age before joining the youth academy of English side Chelsea, helping the youth team win the league.

== Career ==
After playing football in Reunion, Miquel managed in Mayotte. In 2017, she was appointed manager of French side Reims, helping the club achieve promotion to the French top flight. After that, she was elected to the committee of Unecatef, the manager union.

Miquel signed a three year contract to manage WSL side Leicester City in the summer of 2024, guiding the team to a 10th place finish in the league that season. She was dismissed by the club 10 days prior to the opening match of the 2025-26 season.

== Personal life ==
Miquel has a brother.
