= Sam Tierney =

English football player

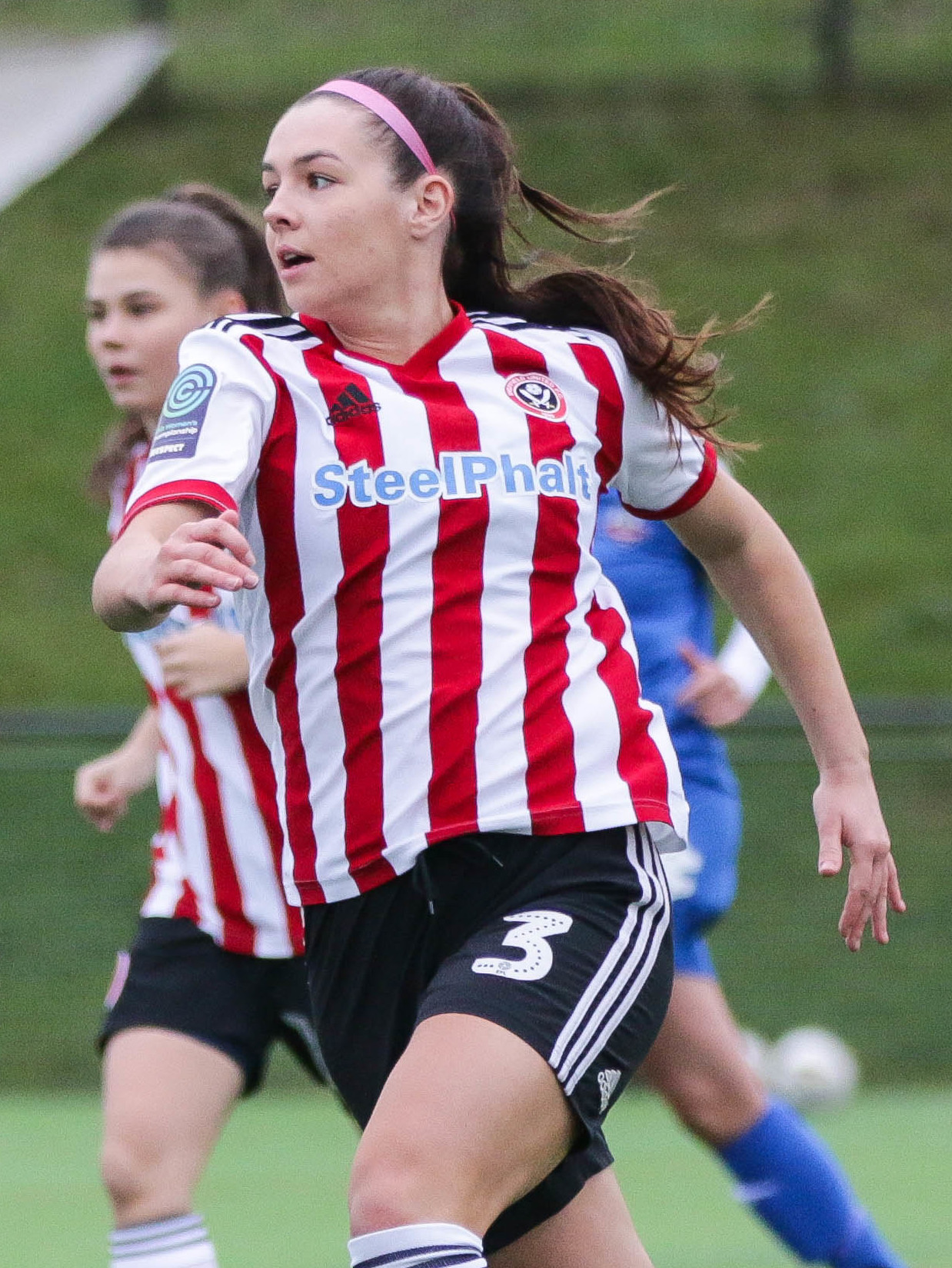
- Tierney with Sheffield United in 2018

Personal information
- Full name: Samantha Tierney
- Date of birth: 8 October 1998 (age 28)
- Place of birth: Sheffield, England
- Height: 1.67 m (5 ft 6 in)
- Positions: Midfielder; defender

Team information
- Current team: Leicester City
- Number: 3

Youth career
- 2006–2014: Sheffield United

Senior career*
Years	Team	Apps	(Gls)
2014–2018	Doncaster Rovers		
2018–2020	Sheffield United	30	(0)
2020–	Leicester City	108	(12)

International career^{‡}
2017	England U19		
- * Club domestic league appearances and goals as of 13 September 2026 ‡ National team caps and goals as of 2 September 2021

Samantha Tierney (/ˈtɪərni/ TEER-nee; born 8 October 1998) is an English professional footballer who plays as a midfielder or defender for and captains Women's Super League 2 club Leicester City.

== Club career ==
She started her career as an academy player at Sheffield United, before joining Doncaster Rovers Belles in 2014, rejoining Sheffield United in 2018, and signing with Leicester City in 2020. Her goal against London City Lionesses in April 2021 helped confirm Leicester's promotion to the Women's Super League ahead of the 2021–22 season. Considered a core member of Leicester's squad, Tierney signed a new contract in 2023, committing to the club for a further two years. She re-signed with Leicester again in 2025.

== International career ==
Tierney has represented England at youth level, playing for several age group teams from under-15 through under-21 level.

== Personal life ==
In 2021, Tierney graduated with distinction from Sheffield Hallam University with a master's degree in Sport Business Management, after previously completing an undergraduate degree in Sports Development with Coaching at the university. She also attended a course to obtain her UEFA A coaching licence as part of an initiative to increase the number of female football coaches.
