= 2015 Arsenal L.F.C. season =

English women's football club season

Arsenal Ladies
2015 season
- Chairman: Sir Chips Keswick
- Manager: Pedro Martínez Losa
- Stadium: Meadow Park
- WSL 1: Third
- FA Cup: Quarter-final
- WSL Cup: Winners
- Top goalscorer: League: Natalia (7); All: Natalia (11)
- Highest home attendance: 2,061 (vs Liverpool, 12 July 2015)
- Biggest win: 0–7 (vs Millwall Lionesses (A), FA Cup, 22 March 2015)
- Biggest defeat: 1–3 (vs Liverpool (H), WSL 1, 12 July 2015)
Home colours	Away colours	Third colours

2015 Arsenal L.F.C. season
Home colours	Away colours	Third colours

The 2015 season was Arsenal Ladies Football Club's 28th season since forming in 1987. The club participated in the fifth edition of the FA WSL, England's top flight for women's football since 2011. Arsenal also played in the Women's FA Cup, and the FA WSL Cup, winning the latter in the final against Notts County in November.

As this season bridged the gap between the Men's Team's 2014–15 and 2015–16 seasons, the team wore two different sets of kits during each half of the season.

== Review ==
=== Pre-season ===
After a disastrous 2014 season that had seen Shelley Kerr depart and ended with the club fourth in the table and losing the WSL Cup Final to Manchester City, Arsenal began to build towards their first full season under Pedro Martinez Losa.

Their pre-season saw Arsenal compete in the International Women's Club Championship in China. In the semi-final, a brace from Shinobu Ohno allowed them to overcome Okayama Yunogo Belle. However, in the Final, it was they who were to suffer a 2-0 defeat, with goals from Rosana and Giovânia winning the tournament for Sáo José.

Back home, Arsenal could only draw 1-1 with Aston Villa, but their form improved with wins against Doncaster Rovers Belles, Millwall Lionesses, Derby County and Yeovil Town to conclude their pre-season.

In the off-season, Yukari Kinga and Shinobu Ohno both departed for INAC Kobe Leonessa. After six years at club, Niamh Fahey left to play for Chelsea, whilst Christie Murray and Freda Ayisi were both signed for Bristol Academy and Birmingham City respectively.

In response to this, Arsenal brought Lianne Sanderson back to the club from the Boston Breakers. Also from the United States came Chioma Ubogagu to bolster Arsenal's attack. Jemma Rose and Natalia Pablos were both signed from Bristol Academy, whilst midfielder Vicky Losada also joined the club from Barcelona.

Meanwhile, Jordan Nobbs and Kelly Smith chose to extend their stay at the club, whilst youth products Carla Humphrey and Leah Williamson signed their first professional contracts.

=== March-May ===
Arsenal began the defence of their FA Cup title with a trip to The Den to play Millwall Lionesses. A Danielle Carter hat-trick helped the reigning champions towards a comprehensive 7-0 win, with Natalia Pablos and Carla Humphrey both scoring their first Arsenal goals. Lianne Sanderson scored on her return to the club, whilst Jordan Nobbs also got off the mark for the season.

Like last season, Arsenal opened their WSL 1 campaign with a trip to Notts County. And it ended with the same result. A clever free-kick routine saw Ellen White score against her former club. Two minutes later, White had the chance to double the Ladypies lead from the spot after she was fouled by Jemma Rose in the box, but could only roll her effort wide. It proved to be a costly miss, as Chioma Ubogagu collected Caroline Weir's pass with six minutes left to play and volleyed the ball past Carly Telford to level the match.

Arsenal's attempt to retain the FA Cup was foiled at the quarter-final stage, with a 2-1 loss to Chelsea. It marked Arsenal's first home loss in the competition since 1994, and their first at Meadow Park since 1997. Ex-Arsenal stars Katie Chapman and Gemma Davison put Chelsea 2-0 up, and although Emma Mitchell was able to halve the deficit before half-time with a 30-yard rocket, Arsenal could not find the equaliser.

Arsenal bounced back by recording their first WSL of the season at home to Bristol Academy. Last season, defeat in this fixture had led to the end of Shelley Kerr's reign. This time around, the result was reversed, as goals for Carla Humphrey and Vicky Losada, her first in Arsenal colours, secured a 2-0 win. Arsenal's winning run continued, as Chioma Ubogagu's first-half goal proved enough to clinch all three points at the Academy Stadium. The result was made easier when Manchester City's Jill Scott was sent off at the start of the second half for head-butting Jade Bailey.

A comprehensive 4-1 win over Sunderland was marred by a season-ending ankle injury to Kelly Smith, after she was brought down in the box by Abby Holmes. The scores were level at 1-1 at the time, with Beth Mead having cancelled out Natalia's fifth minute opener. But after Holmes saw red and Natalia converted the resulting penalty, it became one-way traffic. Humphrey made it 3-1 not long after, and Carter rounded off the win with five minutes left to play.

A London Derby followed, with Arsenal having to play leaders Chelsea for the second time in the same month. This time, the two sides cancelled each other out at Wheatsheaf Park, a result that saw the Gunners miss out on the chance to leapfrog their London rivals into first place. More points were dropped when Arsenal travelled to bottom side Bristol Academy. Ubogagu's converted Alex Scott's cross with a well-executed volley to give Arsenal the lead and temporarily move them to the top of the WSL. But the opportunity was lost when Nicky Watts rolled in a second-half equaliser from the edge of the box. With the WSL now paused for the 2015 World Cup, Arsenal went into the summer break in second place and only a point behind leaders Chelsea.

=== Mid-season ===
During the mid-season break, Arsenal refreshed their squad, with Scottish midfielder Caroline Weir departing for Bristol Academy and Lianne Sanderson returning to the United States to play for Portland Thorns. Goalkeeper Siobhan Chamberlain was loaned out to Notts County, with Netherlands shot-stopper Sari van Veenedaal replacing her. Their Dutch contingent expanded further with the arrival of Dominique Janssen from SGS Essen, whilst Pedro opted to bring in a third Spanish player into his ranks, with Marta Corredera signed from Barcelona.

=== July ===
Following England winning Bronze at the World Cup, the WSL experienced a major spike of interest. Over 2,000 fans attended as Arsenal welcomed reigning champions Liverpool to Meadow Park. But with Nobbs ruled out with a hamstring injury, Arsenal suffered, as Liverpool roared into a 2-0 lead. Fara Williams' effort from range after less than 10 minutes gave the Reds the perfect start, and they soon doubled their money when veteran defender Becky Easton forced Williams' corner into the net. Arsenal recovered, and got back into the contest after the hour when Natalia lobbed goalkeeper Libby Stout. But it was Liverpool who had the final word two minutes from time when Asisat Oshoala took advantage of Marta Corredera's misplaced header and slotted the ball past Emma Byrne.

Arsenal responded to their first defeat of the season with a 1-0 win away at Birmingham City. A clever one-two with Natalia set up Ubogagu to score the winner in the second-half. However, the game is remember for two bookings for two horror lunges by former-Gunner Freda Ayisi on Natalia and Leah Williamson, the latter flipping the England midfielder over the horizontal.

Arsenal's WSL Cup run started with a group stage tie against Watford. It marked a first start for Arsenal for England youth internationals Chloe Kelly and Lotte Wubben-Moy, and the former crowned it with their first goal for the club. Leah Williamson and Rachel Yankey also added their names to the scoresheet.

Back in the WSL, and Arsenal welcomed Notts County to Meadow Park. Jess Clarke, their frequent tormenter, gave the away side the lead after just 5 minutes, when she raced clear of the defence, rounded the keeper and slotted the ball into the empty net. It took until the hour-mark for Arsenal to find the leveller, Carter heading in Corredera's corner. Just over 10 minutes later, Natalia completed the comeback, reacting quickest when Jemma Rose's header came back off the bar. Arsenal's win moved them back up to second place, with leaders Sunderland only ahead of them on goal difference.

Arsenal's next WSL Cup match saw them pitted against London Bees. Amber Gaylor gave the Bees an early lead, but they could only hold out until the 62nd minute. Carla Humphrey equalised and Natalia quickly followed it up with a brace to make it two wins out of two.

=== August ===
Arsenal's title charge began to falter with the visit of Manchester City to Meadow Park. A win would allow Arsenal to finally move clear at the top of the table, but their plans were thrown into jeopardy when Emma Byrne missed a corner, allowing Lucy Bronze to head the ball into the vacated net. Alex Scott found an equaliser from nothing at the start of the second half when her cross deceived Karen Bardsley and looped into the net. However, parity did not last long, as Izzy Christiansen tapped in from close range and Toni Duggan unleashed a screamer from range to take the game beyond Arsenal. Natalia's header with nine minutes left proved only to be a consolation, as Arsenal fell away and opened the door for Manchester City to pass them.

Up next were two back-to-back games against Chelsea, firstly in the WSL Cup at Wheatsheaf Park. Arsenal were grateful to two defensive errors between Marie Hourihan and her defenders in the first half, allowing Corredera to capitalise on both to give the away side a 2-0 lead that they never relinquished.

Chelsea responded with a 2-0 win of their own in the WSL at Meadow Park. Vicky Losada's unfortunate own goal after just eight minutes gifted the Blues the lead, and Arsenal never recovered. The defeat was assured with less than 20 minutes to play, when Emma Mitchell brought down Fran Kirby in the box with a reckless lunge. Gemma Davison converted the spot-kick against her former employers, as Chelsea pulled clear at the top whilst Arsenal continued to fall further away. As their WSL campaign crumbled, Arsenal concluded their WSL Group Stage with a perfect record, securing wins against Reading and Millwall Lionesses to top their group.

=== September-November ===
With a torrid August wrecking their title charge, Arsenal tried to rediscover their momentum with a trip to Liverpool. They were given the perfect opportunity to do just that, when Alex Scott was tripped in the box just before half time, only for Natalia to roll her effort wide of the goal. Luckily for Arsenal, it proved not to be costly, as they eventually took the lead when Dominique Janssen scored her first goal for Arsenal with a well taken free kick. A first league win since July was confirmed when the much missed Jordan Nobbs converted Scott's cutback on her return from her hamstring injury.

Arsenal's next trip took them to Wearside to face Sunderland. Ubogagu scrambled home a loose ball to give her side the lead, only for Mead to once again find an equaliser, rounding Sari van Veenendaal and slotting the ball into the empty net. Arsenal's lead was restored when Ubogagu scored her second, and Natalia confirmed the win when she took advantage of an error at the back to successfully chip the stranded Hilde Gunn Olsen.

Arsenal's WSL Cup quarter final saw them drawn at home against title chasers and reigning champions Manchester City. Having already lost this fixture in the league, and to the same opponents in last season's final, Arsenal were in the mood for revenge, and they found it when Natalia's well executed volley gave them the lead just before half time. City responded in the second half, and went close when Natasha Harding's cross bounced off the crossbar and away to safety, but could not breakdown the Arsenal defence.

Natalia followed up her winner against Manchester City with another in their final WSL game of the season against Birmingham City. Arsenal had to wait until the second half this time around, as the Spanish forward glanced in Carter's cross. A win, coupled with a Manchester City defeat and a huge goal swing could still see Arsenal snatch the last European spot. However, other results failed to go their away, and they ended their WSL campaign in third place, out of Europe and short of the title once more.

Arsenal's season now rested on the WSL Cup. Seven days after playing them in the league, Arsenal welcomed Birmingham City back to Meadow Park for the WSL Cup semi final. Marta Corredera gave the Gunners the perfect start with a beautiful curling effort on 13 minutes. 60 seconds later, Carter had made it 2-0 when she raced clear of the defence and lobbed the bouncing ball over the keeper. Two minutes into the second half, Alex Scott thumped in the rebound after Sophie Baggaley had parried Corredera's effort. And although Kirsty Linnett was able to pull one goal back, Arsenal saw the tie out with relative comfort.

The WSL Cup Final pitted Arsenal against FA Cup finalists Notts County at Rotherham's New York Stadium. Jordan Nobbs opened the scoring with an energetic burst down the right taking her into the box, before her fierce drive beat Telford at her near post. Notts County's plight worsened eight minutes later when Laura Bassett was sent off for a foul on Vicky Losada. Now with a player advantage, Arsenal took full control, with Nobbs doubling her tally with a spectacular effort from long range. It remained 2-0 until the final minute of injury time, when Ubogau placed her effort past Telford from a tight angle to seal a dominant display and claim the first trophy of the Pedro Martinez Losa era.

== Squad information & statistics ==
=== First team squad ===
Squad statistics correct as of May 2018

Squad No.	Name	Date of Birth (Age)	Since	Last Contract	Signed From
Goalkeepers
1	(Republic of Ireland) Emma Byrne	14 June 1979 (aged 36)	2000	December 2013	(Denmark) Fortuna Hjørring
13	(Netherlands) Sari van Veenendaal	3 April 1990 (aged 25)	2015	July 2015	(Netherlands) FC Twente
15	(England) Siobhan Chamberlain	15 August 1983 (aged 32)	2013	December 2013	(England) Bristol Academy
23	(England) Hollie Augustus	16 November 1996 (aged 18)	2015		(England) Arsenal Academy
27	(England) Sian Rogers	28 June 1998 (aged 17)	2015		(England) Birmingham City
Defenders
2	(England) Alex Scott	14 October 1984 (aged 31)	2012	January 2014	(United States) Boston Breakers
3	(Scotland) Emma Mitchell	19 September 1992 (aged 23)	2013	July 2013	(Germany) SGS Essen
4	(Jamaica) Vyan Sampson	2 July 1996 (aged 19)	2014		(England) Arsenal Academy
5	(England) Casey Stoney	13 May 1982 (aged 33)	2014	January 2014	(England) Lincoln
19	(England) Jemma Rose	19 January 1992 (aged 23)	2014	December 2014	(England) Bristol Academy
22	(England) Alice Hassall	8 February 1997 (aged 18)	2015		(England) Arsenal Academy
24	(England) Lotte Wubben-Moy	11 January 1999 (aged 16)	2015		(England) Arsenal Academy
25	(England) Jade Bailey	11 November 1995 (aged 19)	2013	December 2013	(England) Arsenal Academy
28	(England) Taome Oliver	11 May 1996 (aged 19)	2015		(England) Arsenal Academy
29	(England) Chiara Ritchie-Williams	2 September 1998 (aged 17)	2015		(England) Arsenal Academy
Midfielders
6	(Spain) Vicky Losada	5 March 1991 (aged 24)	2015	January 2015	(Spain) Barcelona
8	(England) Jordan Nobbs	8 December 1992 (aged 22)	2010	January 2015	(England) Sunderland
14	(England) Leah Williamson	29 March 1997 (aged 18)	2014	March 2015	(England) Arsenal Academy
16	(England) Carla Humphrey	15 December 1996 (aged 18)	2015	February 2015	(England) Arsenal Academy
17	(Spain) Marta Corredera	8 August 1991 (aged 24)	2015	July 2015	(Spain) Barcelona
20	(Netherlands) Dominique Janssen	17 January 1995 (aged 20)	2015	July 2015	(Germany) SGS Essen
20	(Scotland) Caroline Weir	20 June 1995 (aged 20)	2013	July 2013	(Scotland) Hibernian
22	(England) Charlie Devlin	23 February 1998 (aged 17)	2015		(England) Arsenal Academy
30	(England) Georgia Allen	27 June 1998 (aged 17)	2015		(England) Arsenal Academy
Forwards
7	(England) Lianne Sanderson	3 February 1998 (aged 17)	2014	November 2014	(United States) Boston Breakers
9	(England) Danielle Carter	18 May 1993 (aged 22)	2009	November 2013	(England) Arsenal Academy
10	(England) Kelly Smith (c)	29 October 1978 (aged 37)	2012	February 2015	(United States) Boston Breakers
11	(England) Rachel Yankey	1 November 1979 (aged 35)	2005	January 2014	(United States) New Jersey Wildcats
12	(England) Chioma Ubogagu	10 September 1992 (aged 23)	2015	February 2015	(United States) Pali Blues
17/7 (Note: Natalia Pablos began the season with squad number 17. However, following Lianne Sanderson's departure midway through the season, she changed to squad number 7.)	(Spain) Natalia Pablos	15 October 1985 (aged 30)	2014	December 2014	(England) Bristol Academy
18	(England) Chloe Kelly	15 January 1998 (aged 17)	2015		(England) Arsenal Academy
21	(England) Evie Clarke	17 October 1997 (aged 18)	2015		(England) Arsenal Academy
26	(England) Rianna Dean	21 October 1998 (aged 17)	2015		(England) Arsenal Academy

=== Appearances and goals ===
No.	Name	WSL 1		FA Cup		WSL Cup		Total	
No.	Name	Apps	Goals	Apps	Goals	Apps	Goals	Apps	Goals
Goalkeepers
1	(Republic of Ireland) Emma Byrne	9	0	2	0	1	0	12	0
13	(Netherlands) Sari van Veenendaal	4	0	0	0	7	0	11	0
15	(England) Siobhan Chamberlain	1	0	0	0	0	0	1	0
23	(England) Hollie Augustus	0	0	0	0	0	0	0	0
27	(England) Sian Rogers	0	0	0	0	0	0	0	0
Defenders
2	(England) Alex Scott	12	1	2	0	4	1	18	2
3	(Scotland) Emma Mitchell	10+1	0	2	1	3	0	15+1	1
4	(Jamaica) Vyan Sampson	0+1	0	0	0	1+3	0	1+4	0
5	(England) Casey Stoney	13	0	2	0	7	1	22	1
19	(England) Jemma Rose	14	0	2	0	7	0	23	0
22	(England) Alice Hassall	0	0	0	0	0	0	0	0
24	(England) Lotte Wubben-Moy	1+1	0	0	0	2	0	3+1	0
25	(England) Jade Bailey	8+4	0	0	0	5	0	13+4	0
28	(England) Taome Oliver	0	0	0+1	0	1	0	1+1	0
29	(England) Chiara Ritchie-Williams	0	0	0	0	1+1	0	1+1	0
Midfielders
6	(Spain) Vicky Losada	12	1	2	0	5	1	19	2
8	(England) Jordan Nobbs	6+1	1	2	1	4+1	2	12+2	4
14	(England) Leah Williamson	7	0	1+1	0	4	1	12+1	1
16	(England) Carla Humphrey	2+4	2	1	1	3+1	1	6+5	4
17	(Spain) Marta Corredera	7+1	0	0	0	6+2	3	14+2	3
20	(Netherlands) Dominique Janssen	8	1	0	0	5+3	1	13+3	2
20	(Scotland) Caroline Weir	1+2	0	0+1	0	0	0	1+3	0
22	(England) Charlie Devlin	0	0	0	0	1+1	0	1+1	0
30	(England) Georgia Allen	0+1	0	0	0	2+1	0	2+2	0
Forwards
7	(England) Lianne Sanderson	3+3	0	1+1	1	0	0	4+4	1
9	(England) Danielle Carter	13+1	2	2	3	5+1	2	20+2	7
10	(England) Kelly Smith (c)	1+1	0	1	0	0	0	3	0
11	(England) Rachel Yankey	2+8	0	0	0	3+3	2	5+11	2
12	(England) Chioma Ubogagu	8+6	6	0+1	0	1+4	1	9+11	7
17/7	(Spain) Natalia Pablos	12+1	7	2	1	5+1	3	19+2	11
18	(England) Chloe Kelly	0+2	0	0	0	3+1	2	3+3	2
21	(England) Evie Clarke	0	0	0+1	0	1+1	0	1+2	0
26	(England) Rianna Dean	0	0	0	0	1	0	1	0

=== Goalscorers ===
Rank	No.	Position	Name	WSL 1	FA Cup	WSL Cup	Total
1	17/7	FW	(Spain) Natalia Pablos	7	1	3	11
2	12	FW	(England) Chioma Ubogagu	6	0	1	7
2	9	FW	(England) Danielle Carter	2	3	2	7
4	8	MF	(England) Jordan Nobbs	1	1	2	4
4	16	MF	(England) Carla Humphrey	2	1	1	4
6	17	MF	(Spain) Marta Corredera	0	0	3	3
7	18	FW	(England) Chloe Kelly	0	0	2	2
7	11	MF	(England) Rachel Yankey	0	0	2	2
7	6	MF	(Spain) Vicky Losada	1	0	1	2
7	20	MF	(Netherlands) Dominique Janssen	1	0	1	2
7	2	DF	(England) Alex Scott	1	0	1	2
12	7	FW	(England) Lianne Sanderson	0	1	0	1
12	14	MF	(England) Leah Williamson	0	0	1	1
12	3	DF	(Scotland) Emma Mitchell	0	1	0	1
12	5	DF	(England) Casey Stoney	0	0	1	1
Total				21	8	21	50

=== Disciplinary record ===
Rank	No.	Position	Name	WSL 1		FA Cup		WSL Cup		Total	
Rank	No.	Position	Name	Booked	Sent off (straight red)	Booked	Sent off (straight red)	Booked	Sent off (straight red)	Booked	Sent off (straight red)
1	5	DF	(England) Casey Stoney	2	0	1	0	0	0	3	0
1	25	DF	(England) Jade Bailey	2	0	0	0	1	0	3	0
3	17/7	FW	(Spain) Natalia Pablos	1	0	0	0	1	0	2	0
3	9	FW	(England) Danielle Carter	1	0	0	0	1	0	2	0
3	17	MF	(Spain) Marta Corredera	1	0	0	0	1	0	2	0
3	20	MF	(Netherlands) Dominique Janssen	1	0	0	0	1	0	2	0
7	8	MF	(England) Jordan Nobbs	1	0	0	0	0	0	1	0
7	11	FW	(England) Rachel Yankey	1	0	0	0	0	0	1	0
7	2	DF	(England) Alex Scott	1	0	0	0	0	0	1	0
7	14	MF	(England) Leah Williamson	0	0	0	0	1	0	1	0
7	6	MF	(Spain) Vicky Losada	0	0	0	0	1	0	1	0
7	19	MF	(England) Jemma Rose	0	0	0	0	1	0	1	0
Total				11	0	1	0	8	0	20	0

=== Clean sheets ===
Rank	No.	Name	WSL 1	FA Cup	WSL Cup	Total
1	1	(Republic of Ireland) Emma Byrne	4	1	1	6
1	13	(Netherlands) Sari van Veenendaal	2	0	4	6
3	15	(England) Siobhan Chamberlain	1	0	0	1
Total			7	1	5	13

== Transfers, loans and other signings ==
=== Transfers in ===
Announcement date	No.	Position	Player	From club
18 November 2014	7	FW	(England) Lianne Sanderson	(United States) Boston Breakers
12 December 2014	19	DF	(England) Jemma Rose	(England) Bristol Academy
16 December 2014	17	FW	(Spain) Natalia Pablos	(England) Bristol Academy
22 January 2015	6	MF	(Spain) Vicky Losada	(Spain) Barcelona
12 February 2015	12	FW	(England) Chioma Ubogagu	(United States) Pali Blues
6 June 2015	27	GK	(England) Sian Rogers	(England) Birmingham City
8 July 2015	17	MF	(Spain) Marta Corredera	(Spain) Barcelona
10 July 2015	13	GK	(Netherlands) Sari van Veenendaal	(Netherlands) FC Twente
10 July 2015	20	MF	(Netherlands) Dominique Janssen	(Germany) SGS Essen

=== Contract extensions ===
Announcement date	No.	Position	Player	At Arsenal since
5 January 2015	8	FW	(England) Jordan Nobbs	2010
19 February 2015	10	FW	(England) Kelly Smith	2012
20 February 2015	16	MF	(England) Carla Humphrey	2015
31 March 2015	14	MF	(England) Leah Williamson	2014
26 August 2015	1	GK	(Republic of Ireland) Emma Byrne	2000
26 August 2015	3	DF	(Scotland) Emma Mitchell	2013
26 August 2015	2	DF	(England) Alex Scott	2012
26 August 2015	5	DF	(England) Casey Stoney	2014

=== Transfers out ===
Announcement date	No.	Position	Player	To club
19 December 2014	19	DF	(Republic of Ireland) Niamh Fahey	(England) Chelsea
8 January 2015	4	DF	(Japan) Yukari Kinga	(Japan) INAC Kobe Leonessa
8 January 2015	7	FW	(Japan) Shinobu Ohno	(Japan) INAC Kobe Leonessa
15 January 2015	16	MF	(Scotland) Christie Murray	(England) Bristol Academy
16 February 2015	24	MF	(Ghana) Freda Ayisi	(England) Birmingham City
30 June 2015	22	DF	(England) Alice Hassall	(England) Notts County
9 July 2015	20	MF	(Scotland) Caroline Weir	(England) Bristol Academy
10 July 2015	7	FW	(England) Lianne Sanderson	(United States) Portland Thorns FC
2015	36	MF	(England) Frances Steele	(United States) Yale Bulldogs

=== Loans out ===
Announcement date	No.	Position	Player	To club
9 July 2015	15	GK	(England) Siobhan Chamberlain	(England) Notts County

== Club ==
=== Kit (2014-15) ===
Supplier: Puma / Sponsor: Fly Emirates

Home	Home alt.	Away

==== Kit usage (2014-15) ====
Kit	Combination	Usage	
Home	Red body; White sleeves; White shorts; Red hooped socks	WSL	Notts County (A); Bristol Academy (H); Manchester City (A); Sunderland (H); Chelsea (A)
Home	Red body; White sleeves; White shorts; Red hooped socks	FA Cup	Chelsea (H)
Home alt.	Red body; White sleeves; White shorts; Red socks	WSL	Notts County (A)
Away	Yellow body; Navy blue sleeves; Navy blue shorts; Navy hooped socks	WSL	Bristol Academy (A)
Away	Yellow body; Navy blue sleeves; Navy blue shorts; Navy hooped socks	FA Cup	Millwall Lionesses (A)

=== Kit (2015-16) ===
Supplier: Puma / Sponsor: Fly Emirates

Home	Home alt.	Away	Goalkeeper 1	Goalkeeper 2	Goalkeeper 3

=== Kit information ===
This is Puma's second year supplying Arsenal kit, having taken over from Nike at the beginning of the 2014–15 season.

- Home: The home kit features Arsenal's traditional colours of red and white. The kit features red trim on the sleeves and a grandad collar. Additionally, golden trim features on the kit for the first time since 2006–07. The traditional white socks are returned to the kit after the club played in hooped socks last season.
- Away: The away kit features the colours gold and navy, and is similar to the away kit worn in the 2001–02 season. The shirt has navy shoulders and a crew-neck, but the most striking feature of the kit is the subtle diamond graphic on the body of the shirt. The strip is combined with navy shorts and socks.
- Third: The third kit, which is set to be used in cup competitions, is mainly anthracite with white, gold and 'Capri Breeze' (turquoise) diagonal sashes. The kit features a monochromatic golden Arsenal badge and is combined with anthracite shorts and socks.
- Keeper: The goalkeeper kits are based in Puma new goalkeeper template utilised by the supplier's top clubs, which feature contrasting hoops on the top half of the body. The first-choice strip is dark grey with golden hoops and a lighter grey stripe on the sleeves, while the second-choice strip is aqua with black hoops and golden detailing. The alternative strip is orange and also features black hoops.

==== Kit usage (2015-16) ====
Kit	Combination	Usage	
Home	Red body, white sleeves, white shorts, white socks	WSL	Liverpool (H), Birmingham City (A), Notts County (H), Manchester City (H), Chelsea (H), Birmingham City (H)
Home	Red body, white sleeves, white shorts, white socks	WSL Cup	Watford (H), London Bees (A), Chelsea (A), Reading (H), Manchester City (H), Birmingham City (H), Notts County (N)
Home alt.	Red body, white sleeves, white shorts, red socks	WSL Cup	Millwall Lionesses (A)
Away	Gold body, navy sleeves, navy shorts, navy socks	WSL	Liverpool (A), Sunderland (A)

== Non-competitive ==
=== Women's Club Championship ===
4 December 2014 Semi-Final	Okayama Yunogo Belle	0–2	Arsenal	Kita
19:05 BST		Report	Ohno 16', 58'	Stadium: Nishigaoka Soccer Stadium

6 December 2014 Final	Arsenal	0–2	São José	Kita
15:10 BST		Report	Rosana 4'; Giovânia 71' (pen.)	Stadium: Nishigaoka Soccer Stadium

=== Pre-season friendlies ===
8 February 2015	Aston Villa	1–1	Arsenal	Sutton Coldfield
14:00 GMT				Stadium: Central Ground

15 February 2015	Arsenal	4–1	Doncaster Rover Belles	Borehamwood
14:00 GMT	Nobbs 50', 70'; Sanderson 50'; Sampson 80'	Report	Barker 55'	Stadium: Meadow Park

22 February 2015	Millwall Lionesses	0–3	Arsenal	Beckenham
14:00 GMT		Report	Humphrey 30'; Yankey 42'; Nobbs 60'	Stadium: Eden Park Avenue

25 February 2015	Derby County	0–5	Arsenal	Spondon
19:30 GMT		Report	Nobbs 15'; Scott 30'; Natalia 40', 75'; Kelly 65'	Stadium: Anderson Electrical Arena

15 March 2015	Arsenal	4–2	Yeovil Town	London Colney
				Stadium: Arsenal Training Centre

== Competitions ==
=== Overall record ===
Competition	First match	Last match	Starting round	Final position	Record							
Competition	First match	Last match	Starting round	Final position	Pld	W	D	L	GF	GA	GD	Win %
FA WSL 1	2 April 2015	4 October 2015	Matchday 1	3rd	14	8	3	3	21	13	+8	57.14
Women's FA Cup	22 March 2015	12 April 2015	Fifth round	Quarter-finals	2	1	0	1	8	2	+6	50.00
FA WSL Cup	23 July 2015	1 November 2015	Group stage	Winners	8	8	0	0	21	3	+18	100.00
Total					24	17	3	4	50	18	+32	70.83

Source: FA WSL

=== FA WSL 1 ===
==== Partial league table ====
Pos	Team	Pld	W	D	L	GF	GA	GD	Pts	Qualification or relegation
1	Chelsea (C)	14	10	2	2	30	10	+20	32	Qualification for the Champions League knockout phase
2	Manchester City	14	9	3	2	25	11	+14	30	Qualification for the Champions League knockout phase
3	Arsenal	14	8	3	3	21	13	+8	27	
4	Sunderland	14	6	2	6	24	24	0	20	
5	Notts County	14	4	3	7	20	20	0	15	

Source: FA WSL
Rules for classification: 1) Points; 2) Goal difference; 3) Number of goals scored
(C) Champions

=== Results summary ===
Overall								Home						Away					
Pld	W	D	L	GF	GA	GD	Pts	W	D	L	GF	GA	GD	W	D	L	GF	GA	GD
14	8	3	3	21	13	+8	27	4	0	3	12	10	+2	4	3	0	9	3	+6

=== Results by matchday ===
Matchday	1	2	3	4	5	6	7	8	9	10	11	12	13	14
Ground	A	H	A	H	A	A	H	A	H	H	H	A	A	H
Result	D	W	W	W	D	D	L	W	W	L	L	W	W	W
Position	5	2	2	2	2	2	2	2	1	3	3	2	2	3

Updated to match(es) played on 20 May 2018. Source: FA WSL
W = Win; D = Draw; L = Loss

==== Matches ====
2 April 2015 1	Notts County	1–1	Arsenal	Nottingham
19:30 BST	White 28' (penalty missed) 30' (yellow card) 77'	Report	Nobbs (yellow card) 63'; Stoney (yellow card) 79'; Ubogagu 84'	Stadium: Meadow Lane; Attendance: 1,612; Referee: Stephen Ross

15 April 2015 2	Arsenal	2–0	Bristol Academy	Borehamwood
19:45 BST	Humphrey 15'; Losada 34'	Report		Stadium: Meadow Park; Attendance: 811; Referee: Sian Piret

19 April 2015 3	Manchester City	0–1	Arsenal	Manchester
14:00 BST	J. Scott (red card) 56'	Report	Ubogagu 37'; Bailey (yellow card) 57'	Stadium: Academy Stadium; Attendance: 1,167; Referee: Martyn Rawcliffe

26 April 2015 4	Arsenal	4–1	Sunderland	Borehamwood
14:00 BST	Natalia 5', 73' (pen.); Humphrey 77'; Carter 85'	Report	Mead 24'; Holmes (red card) 72'	Stadium: Meadow Park; Attendance: 815; Referee: Stuart Franklin

30 April 2015 5	Chelsea	0–0	Arsenal	Staines
19:30 BST		Report		Stadium: Wheatsheaf Park; Attendance: 1,407; Referee: Nigel Lugg

9 May 2015 6	Bristol Academy	1–1	Arsenal	Stoke Gifford
18:30 BST	Watts 67'; Ladd (yellow card) 89'	Report	Ubogagu 14'; Natalia (yellow card) 65'	Stadium: Stoke Gifford Stadium; Attendance: 1,045; Referee: Richard Hulme

12 July 2015 7	Arsenal	1–3	Liverpool	Borehamwood
14:00 BST	Carter (yellow card) 28'; Natalia 64'	Report	Williams 9'; Easton 17'; Longhurst (yellow card) 37'; Stout (yellow card) 63'; Oshoala (yellow card) 67' (goal) 88'	Stadium: Meadow Park; Attendance: 2,061; Referee: David Rock

19 July 2015 8	Birmingham City	0–1	Arsenal	Solihull
18:00 BST	Ayisi (yellow card) 40' (yellow-red card) 45'	Report	Corredera (yellow card) 12'; Ubogagu 53'; Yankey (yellow card) 90'	Stadium: Damson Park; Attendance: 1,278; Referee: Ollie Yates

26 July 2015 9	Arsenal	2–1	Notts County	Borehamwood
14:00 BST	Carter 60'; Natalia 71'	Report	Clarke 3'; Williams (yellow card) 44'; Walton (yellow card) 90'	Stadium: Meadow Park; Attendance: 804; Referee: Richard Hart

9 August 2015 10	Arsenal	2–3	Manchester City	Borehamwood
14:00 BST	A. Scott 46' (yellow card) 50'; Natalia 81'	Report	Bronze 23'; Christiansen 60' (yellow card) 89'; Duggan 68'	Stadium: Meadow Park; Attendance: 1,422; Referee: Sam Purkiss

23 August 2015 11	Arsenal	0–2	Chelsea	Borehamwood
18:00 BST	Bailey (yellow card) 68'; Janssen (yellow card) 87'	Report	Losada 8' (o.g.); Chapman (yellow card) 44'; Davison 71' (pen.); Rafferty (yellow card) 81'	Stadium: Meadow Park; Attendance: 1,517; Referee: Ashvin Degnarain

5 September 2015 12	Liverpool	0–2	Arsenal	Widnes
12:30 BST	Murray (yellow card) 45'	Report	Natalia (penalty missed) 42'; Janssen 66'; Nobbs 81'	Stadium: Halton Stadium; Attendance: 769; Referee: Adrian Holmes

26 September 2015 13	Sunderland	1–3	Arsenal	Hetton-le-Hole
13:30 BST	Mead 21'; Greenwell (yellow card) 90+5'	Report	Ubogagu 15', 53'; Natalia 76'; Stoney (yellow card) 87'	Stadium: Hetton Centre; Attendance: 1,166; Referee: Martin Coy

4 October 2015 14	Arsenal	1–0	Birmingham City	Borehamwood
18:00 BST	Natalia 48'	Report		Stadium: Meadow Park; Attendance: 814; Referee: Sian Piret

=== Women's FA Cup ===
22 March 2015 Fifth round	Millwall Lionesses	0–7	Arsenal	Bermondsey
14:00 GMT		Report	Carter 18', 52', 85'; Sanderson 24'; Nobbs 41'; Natalia 55'; Humphrey 75'	Stadium: The Den

12 April 2015 Quarter-finals	Arsenal	1–2	Chelsea	Borehamwood
14:00 BST	Mitchell 45'; Stoney (yellow card) 88'	Report	Chapman 18'; Davison 30'	Stadium: Meadow Park; Attendance: 936; Referee: Andrew Aylott

=== FA WSL Cup ===
==== Group Stage ====
Pos	Team	Pld	W	D	L	GF	GA	GD	Pts	Qualification	ARS	CHE	REA	MIL	WAT	LON
1	Arsenal	5	5	0	0	14	2	+12	15	Advance to knock-out stage	—	—	2–1	—	3–0	—
2	Chelsea	5	4	0	1	20	4	+16	12	Advance to knock-out stage	0–2	—	—	6–0	—	8–0
3	Reading	5	3	0	2	12	7	+5	9	Advance to knock-out stage	—	2–3	—	—	—	3–0
4	Millwall Lionesses	5	2	0	3	10	18	−8	6		0–4	—	1–3	—	—	5–3
5	Watford	5	1	0	4	6	15	−9	3		—	0–3	1–3	2–4	—	—
6	London Bees	5	0	0	5	6	22	−16	0		1–3	—	—	—	2–3	—

Rules for classification: 1) Points; 2) Goal difference; 3) Number of goals scored

23 July 2015 1	Arsenal	3–0	Watford	Borehamwood
19:45 BST	Williamson 16'; Kelly 22'; Yankey 36' (pen.)	Report		Stadium: Meadow Park; Referee: Daniel Cook

29 July 2015 2	London Bees	1–3	Arsenal	Canons Park
19:30 BST	Gaylor 21'	Report	Humphrey 62'; Natalia 65', 72'	Stadium: The Hive; Referee: Louise Saunders

16 August 2015 3	Chelsea	0–2	Arsenal	Staines
14:00 BST		Report	Corredera 18', 38'; Natalia (yellow card) 36'; Bailey (yellow card) 71'	Stadium: Wheatsheaf Park; Referee: Stephen Bates

27 August 2015 4	Arsenal	2–1	Reading	Borehamwood
19:45 BST	Stoney 45'; Losada 63'	Report	Walkley (yellow card) 24'; Watts 90'	Stadium: Meadow Park; Referee: Lucy Oliver

30 August 2015 5	Millwall Lionesses	0–4	Arsenal	Bermondsey
14:00 BST	Maple (yellow card) 90'	Report	Carter 10' (yellow card) 10'; Yankey 12'; Kelly 15'; Janssen 75'	Stadium: The Den

==== Knockout stage ====
1 October 2015 Quarter-finals	Arsenal	1–0	Manchester City	Borehamwood
19:45 BST	Natalia 34'; Williamson (yellow card) 64'	Report	Houghton (yellow card) 44'; Bronze (yellow card) 68'	Stadium: Meadow Park; Attendance: 720; Referee: Josh Smith

11 October 2015 Semi-finals	Arsenal	3–1	Birmingham City	Borehamwood
15:00 BST	Corredera 13'; Carter 14'; Janssen (yellow card) 38'; Losada (yellow card) 42'; A. Scott 47'; Rose (yellow card) 90+2'	Report	Linnett 58' (yellow card) 76'	Stadium: Meadow Park; Attendance: 782; Referee: Nigel Lugg

1 November 2015 Final	Arsenal	3–0	Notts County	Rotherham
15:00 GMT	Nobbs 26', 41'; Corredera (yellow card) 61'; Kelly (yellow card) 90'; Ubogagu 90+2'	Report	Greenwood (yellow card) 32'; Bassett (red card) 34'; Whelan (yellow card) 77'	Stadium: New York Stadium; Attendance: 5,028; Referee: Jane Simms

== See also ==
- List of Arsenal W.F.C. seasons
- 2014–15 in English football
- 2015–16 in English football
