= 2017–18 Arsenal W.F.C. season =

English women's football club season

Arsenal Women
2017–18 season
- Chairman: Sir Chips Keswick
- Manager: Pedro Martinez Losa (Until 25 October 2017); Ismael García Gómez (From 25 October 2017 until 5 December 2017, interim); Joe Montemurro (From 5 December 2017)
- Stadium: Meadow Park
- WSL 1: Third
- FA Cup: Runners-up
- WSL Cup: Winners
- Top goalscorer: League: Beth Mead (8); All: Beth Mead (16)
- Highest home attendance: 1,807 (vs Chelsea, 1 April 2018)
- Biggest win: 7–0 (vs London Bees (H), WSL Cup, 24 September 2017)
- Biggest defeat: 2–5 (vs Manchester City (A), WSL 1, 30 September 2017)
Home colours	Away colours

The 2017–18 season was Arsenal Women's Football Club's 31st season of competitive football. They won the WSL Cup for the 5th time and finished runner-up to Chelsea in the Women's FA Cup. Arsenal finished 3rd in the Women's Super League, missing out on a spot in UEFA Women's Champions League by 1 point.

Joe Montemurro took over as Manager of Arsenal on 5 December 2017 after Pedro Martínez Losa had departed the club, one month into the season.

== Review ==
=== Pre Season ===
It was a summer of change for Arsenal, with academy graduates Carla Humphrey, Sian Rogers, Rianna Dean and Charlie Devlin all leaving the club. Also departing was experienced England midfielder Fara Williams, who chose to move to Reading.

Promising young stars Katie McCabe and Chloe Kelly went out on loan to Glasgow City and Everton respectively. Kelly would go on to make her move to Merseyside permanent in January.

In their place, Arsenal reinforced their defence with Jessica Samuelsson from Linköping and brought Josephine Henning back from Lyon for her second spell at the club. In attack, Arsenal made a double acquisition from Bayern Munich, bringing in Scottish winger Lisa Evans and Dutch striker Vivianne Miedema.

Arsenal played two pre-season fixtures, a 3-0 loss away at Turbine Potsdam, and a 3-0 win over Everton at Meadow Park.

=== September ===
Arsenal opened their WSL campaign with a five-goal thriller at home to Birmingham City. Ellen White gave the Blues the lead when she outstripped Samuelsson and Henning for pace to race onto a long pass and slotted the ball past Sari van Veenendaal. Jodie Taylor equalised when Daniëlle van de Donk's smart pass found her free in the box. White doubled her tally against her former club in the second half, and was denied the chance of a hat-trick with ten minutes remaining when Louise Quinn brought her down as she threatened to burst clear. With Quinn sent off, it looked a tall order for Arsenal to salvage the match, but they were given a lifeline when Lisa Evans scored her first goal for the club to level the match again. And then on 90 minutes, Taylor converted from the penalty spot to complete a remarkable comeback.

Arsenal followed up their heroic win with a disastrous display at Manchester City, as the Citizens ran rampant in a 5-2 win. A near post flick from Jane Ross and a Steph Houghton volley were initially cancelled out by Emma Mitchell's header and Heather O'Reilly's scrambled effort. Manchester City, however, were relentless, and once Georgia Stanway gave them the lead for the third time, they never looked back. Izzy Christiansen capitalised on a defensive mistake from Jordan Nobbs, and Jill Scott completed the rout with ten minutes left to play. It was the most goals ever conceded by Arsenal in a WSL match, in one of their worst ever defeats, and put serious pressure on manager Pedro Martinez Losa.

=== October ===
October brought no further joy for Arsenal, as another poor result, this time against Bristol City, saw them fall further behind in the title race. Lauren Hemp was able to spin Samuelsson far too easily, and after cutting inside, she unleashed a curling effort that gave Van Veenendaal no chance. Arsenal were able to rally in the second half and levelled the match through Van de Donk, but there was no winner to be found. It proved to be the final straw for Pedro, who in the weeks to come departed the club after three years at the helm. His final match in charge was a WSL Cup tie against London Bees, which Arsenal easily won 7-0.

Whilst Arsenal looked for Pedro's replacement assistant coach Ismael García Gómez took over as interim manager. His first game in charge was away at Everton, which Arsenal won 2-0. Vivianne Miedema scored her first goal for the club, and the win was confirmed late in the second half when Lizzie Durack's clearance was fired straight to Beth Mead, whose lobbed volley from range flew over her head and into the back of the net.

=== November ===
November opened with two WSL Cup ties which provided mixed fortunes for the Gunners. A 5-2 win over Millwall Lionesses was somewhat negated by a surprise 2-1 home loss to Reading, a game notorious for former Arsenal midfielder Fara Williams scoring direct from the kick-off.

A 6-0 win away at Watford saw Arsenal make it through to the knockout stage as runners-up in Group One South.

In the League, Arsenal made it back-to-back wins for the first time that season, with a 3-0 win over Sunderland. Quinn glanced home Jordan Nobbs' free kick in the second half to give the Gunners a deserved lead. Miedema then doubled their lead 10 minutes later with a curling finish. With less than 15 minutes to play, Nobbs confirmed the win with a well-placed free kick.

=== December ===
Just over a month after Pedro's departure, Joe Montemurro arrived as Arsenal's new manager. His first match in charge was a WSL Cup quarter-final with Sunderland at Meadow Park. Jordan Nobbs scored the first goal of this new era at Arsenal, followed by another goal from Miedema. Bridget Galloway was able to pull a goal back after mistake from Carter, but former Sunderland forward Beth Mead was able to secure the win and safe passage into the semi-finals.

=== Winter Transfer Window ===
More departures in the Winter Transfer Window further reduced Arsenal's squad. Taylor Hinds followed Chloe Kelly to Everton. Jemma Rose and Vyan Sampson also left the club later in the window. Whilst Arsenal chose not to sign anyone in the window, they did opt to recall Katie McCabe from her loan spell at Glasgow City.

=== January ===
Arsenal suffered a rough return to the WSL following the winter break with a winless January. Joe Montemurro suffered his first defeat as Arsenal manager when he took his side to Kingsmeadow to face second-placed Chelsea. Maren Mjelde's first half scrambled effort was cancelled out when Miedema converted Nobbs' cross. Chelsea were quick to restore their lead, Ji So-yun's effort just creeping over the line, despite the efforts of Jemma Rose. Again, Arsenal responded, with Dominique Janssen forcing home Nobbs' corner. But with time running out and a draw looking likely, Van Veenendaal fumbled a low cross over her own goal line to gift all three points to Chelsea.

It also finished 3-2 in the WSL Cup, but this time, it was Arsenal who were the beneficiaries of a late twist. Their semi-final saw them paired off with Reading, and they made the perfect start when Beth Mead volleyed home after Danielle Carter's cross was missed by the Royals' defence. Reading's response was rapid, Brooke Chaplen's exquisite effort giving the home side parity. Both sides had chances to nudge ahead, and it was Reading who looked to have found the winner on 70 minutes through Lauren Bruton's well placed effort. But in the last 10 minutes, goals from Miedema and Nobbs swung the tie back the Gunners way and booked their place in the WSL Cup Final.

Two weeks later and it was a rematch between the two sides, this time in the WSL. This time however, there was to be no drama at all, as both teams played out a 0-0 draw. It was a result that saw Arsenal fall to fourth place, 10 points off leaders Manchester City, ending any hope of a WSL Title

=== February ===
Arsenal returned to winning ways at the start of February with the commencement of their FA Cup campaign away at Yeovil Town. Despite both Mead and Carter missing first half penalties, goals from Nobbs, Mead and an own goal from Hannah Miles saw the Gunners progress to the next round. There, they faced Milwall Lionesses, and it was Mead who made the difference, scoring past former Arsenal keeper Sarah Quantrill for the only goal of the game. Then, with 15 minutes left to play, Kim Little was subbed on, making her long awaited return from an ACL injury.

In the WSL, Arsenal made it three wins from three to move up to third place. Away at Liverpool, Miedema saw her penalty saved, but was quick to convert the rebound. Then, with half time approaching, Janssen's looping effort from the edge of the box found the top corner. Lisa Evans' fierce near post drive midway through the second half secured the win. Back at Meadow Park, Arsenal trounced Yeovil Town 4-0 thanks to braces from Carter and Mead, and then followed that up with a 1-0 win over Everton.

=== March ===
Arsenal took their winning momentum into the WSL Cup Final, where they faced Manchester City. A tight contest was settled by a single goal from Vivianne Meidema, capitalising on Jen Beattie's mis-directed header and outmuscling Demi Stokes to finish past Ellie Roebuck. Arsenal were able to see out the win, winning their fifth WSL Cup and a first major trophy for two years.

In the FA Cup, Arsenal faced Charlton Athletic in the quarter-finals. Kim Little's early penalty put the Gunners on their way, but it took until midway through the second half for Arsenal to finish off The Addicks' resistance. Heather O'Reilly's drilled effort and Miedema's header made the game safe, before Carter and Nobbs' late goals added the gloss on a 5-0 win.

=== April ===
Arsenal faced a marathon April as they looked to try to add the FA Cup to their trophy haul and secure a return to European Football. First up was Chelsea, and misplaced clearance from Van Veenendaal gifted Chelsea the lead on the half-hour mark. However, a marauding run from Mead on the cusp of half time ended with her squeezing her strike in at the near post to ensure it ended honours even.

Arsenal rediscovered their winning touch in their home match against Reading. Kim Little's well placed effort set the tone, and Janssen's header doubled their money. Reading were briefly back in the contest when Williams found the net with a thumping volley, but it wasn't to be. Van de Donk's dancing feet flummoxed the Reading defence and keeper, allowing the simplest of tasks to roll the ball into the empty net.

Unfortunately, Arsenal's momentum was beginning to run dry, as they suffered an embarrassing 0-0 draw away at Yeovil Town. Despite dominating the match, the found keeper Megan Walsh in impenetrable form. It was only the second point Yeovil Town had won that season.

A second half rocket from Katie McCabe saw her open her account for Arsenal and help them on their way to three points against Liverpool. A Jordan Nobbs brace secured the win, including an Olimpico effort direct from the corner.

Any lingering hopes of European football were all but extinguished, however, after Arsenal's trip to Solihull to play Birmingham City. An Ellen White hat-trick clinched the win, and it could have been worse, had Van Veenendaal not saved Aoife Mannion's penalty.

European Football may have been lost, but there was still a chance for Arsenal to claim a second trophy. They travelled to Everton for their FA Cup semi-final. Carter gave them the lead when she converted O'Reilly's low cross, but former Arsenal forward Chloe Kelly levelled the tie from the penalty spot midway through the second half. With the 90 minutes up, it looked as though extra-time and penalties were inevitable, until Louise Quinn rose to meet Nobbs' corner and crash home the header with seconds to spare.

=== May ===
May opened with the FA Cup Final at Wembley, and a replay of the 2016 Final, as Arsenal took on Chelsea. Arsenal were the victors then, but this was to be Chelsea's day. After an even first half, the Blues pulled away thanks to a splendid brace from Ramona Bachmann. Arsenal were able to pull a goal back when Vivianne Miedema tapped in Mead's low cross, but Fran Kirby rendered it irrelevant three minutes later when she curled the ball past Van Veenendaal.

Seven days later, Arsenal were back at Meadow Park to play Manchester City, whilst also saying farewell to captain Alex Scott, who was retiring at the end of the season after a stellar career over three spells at the club. Nadia Nadim threatened to spoil the farewell party after she capitalised on Van Veenendaal's slip to put the Citizens ahead after just 11 minutes. But Arsenal were able to turn it around in the second half thanks to goals from Van de Donk and Mead, completing a 2-1 win. It was a result that moved the title out of Manchester City's reach, with Arsenal now within a point of European Football.

Arsenal comfortably won their remaining matches against Sunderland and Bristol City, but with Manchester City also winning theirs, it was ultimately in vain. It was a third placed finish for a fourth season in a row for Arsenal, missing out on Europe by a solitary point.

== Squad information & statistics ==
=== First team squad ===
Squad statistics correct as of May 2018

Squad No.	Name	Date of Birth (Age)	Since	Last Contract	Signed From
Goalkeepers
1	(Netherlands) Sari van Veenendaal	3 April 1990 (aged 28)	2015	April 2016	(Netherlands) FC Twente
13	(England) Anna Moorhouse	30 March 1995 (aged 23)	2017	February 2017	(England) Doncaster Rovers Belles
31	(England) Lucy Thomas	21 March 2000 (aged 18)	2017		(England) Arsenal Academy
32	(England) Emma Gibson		2017		(England) Arsenal Academy
Defenders
2	(England) Alex Scott (c)	30 October 1984 (aged 33)	2012	July 2017	(United States) Boston Breakers
3	(Scotland) Emma Mitchell	19 September 1992 (aged 25)	2013	August 2015	(Germany) SGS Essen
5	(Germany) Josephine Henning	8 September 1989 (aged 28)	2017	August 2017	(France) Lyon
6	(England) Leah Williamson	29 March 1997 (aged 21)	2014	July 2015	(England) Arsenal Academy
12	(Jamaica) Vyan Sampson	2 July 1996 (aged 21)	2014	January 2016	(England) Arsenal Academy
16	(Republic of Ireland) Louise Quinn	17 June 1990 (aged 28)	2017	May 2017	(England) Notts County
19	(England) Jemma Rose	19 January 1992 (aged 26)	2014	December 2015	(England) Bristol Academy
25	(Sweden) Jessica Samuelsson	30 January 1992 (aged 26)	2017	August 2017	(Sweden) Linköping FC
29	(England) Shannon Cooke	2 February 2000 (aged 18)	2018	Academy	(England) Arsenal Academy
Midfielders
8	(England) Jordan Nobbs	8 December 1992 (aged 25)	2010	February 2016	(England) Sunderland
10	(Scotland) Kim Little	29 June 1990 (aged 28)	2016	October 2016	(United States) Seattle Reign
17	(United States) Heather O'Reilly	1 February 1985 (aged 33)	2017	January 2017	(United States) Kansas City
20	(Netherlands) Dominique Janssen	17 January 1995 (aged 23)	2015	April 2016	(Germany) SGS Essen
21	(Netherlands) Daniëlle van de Donk	5 August 1991 (aged 26)	2015	October 2016	(Sweden) Kopparbergs/Göteborg FC
24	(Jamaica) Taylor Hinds	25 April 1999 (aged 19)	2016		(England) Arsenal Academy
26	(England) Ava Kuyken	15 June 2001 (aged 17)	2017		(England) Arsenal Academy
27	(Wales) Anna Filbey	11 October 1999 (aged 18)	2017		(England) Arsenal Academy
Forwards
9	(England) Danielle Carter	18 May 1993 (aged 25)	2009	August 2017	(England) Arsenal Academy
11	(Netherlands) Vivianne Miedema	15 July 1996 (aged 21)	2017	May 2017	(Germany) Bayern Munich
14	(England) Jodie Taylor	17 May 1986 (aged 32)	2016	March 2016	(United States) Portland Thorns
15	(Republic of Ireland) Katie McCabe	21 September 1995 (aged 22)	2015	December 2015	(Republic of Ireland) Shelbourne
18	(Scotland) Lisa Evans	21 May 1992 (aged 26)	2017	June 2017	(Germany) Bayern Munich
22	(England) Lauren James	29 September 2001 (aged 16)	2017	Academy	(England) Arsenal Academy
23	(England) Beth Mead	9 May 1995 (aged 23)	2017	January 2017	(England) Sunderland
28	(England) Jessica Ngunga	23 September 2000 (aged 17)	2017	Academy	(England) Arsenal Academy

=== Appearances and goals ===
No.	Name	WSL 1		FA Cup		WSL Cup		Total	
No.	Name	Apps	Goals	Apps	Goals	Apps	Goals	Apps	Goals
Goalkeepers
1	(Netherlands) Sari van Veenendaal	14	0	2	0	0	0	19	0
13	(England) Anna Moorhouse	4	0	3	0	0	0	11	0
31	(England) Lucy Thomas	0	0	0	0	0	0	0	0
32	(England) Emma Gibson	0	0	0	0	0	0	0	0
Defenders
2	(England) Alex Scott (c)	1+2	0	2	0	2	0	5+3	0
3	(Scotland) Emma Mitchell	15+2	1	3+1	0	6	3	24+3	4
5	(Germany) Josephine Henning	3	0	0	0	0	0	3	0
6	(England) Leah Williamson	14+3	1	4	0	7	0	25+3	1
12	(Jamaica) Vyan Sampson	0	0	0	0	0	0	0	0
16	(Republic of Ireland) Louise Quinn	14+2	1	5	1	3+3	1	22+5	3
19	(England) Jemma Rose	4	0	0	0	6	0	10	0
25	(Sweden) Jessica Samuelsson	2	0	0	0	0	0	2	0
29	(England) Shannon Cooke	0+2	0	0	0	0	0	0+2	0
Midfielders
8	(England) Jordan Nobbs	17	3	5	2	7	4	29	9
10	(Scotland) Kim Little	8+1	3	3+1	0	1	1	12+2	4
17	(United States) Heather O'Reilly	10+6	1	4+1	1	3+4	0	17+11	2
20	(Netherlands) Dominique Janssen	16+1	3	4	0	6+1	1	26+2	4
21	(Netherlands) Daniëlle van de Donk	17+1	5	4	0	5	1	26+1	6
24	(Jamaica) Taylor Hinds	0	0	0	0	1+1	0	1+1	0
26	(England) Ava Kuyken	0+3	0	0+1	0	0+1	0	0+5	0
27	(Wales) Anna Filbey	0+1	0	0	0	1	0	1+1	0
Forwards
9	(England) Danielle Carter	11+6	2	4+1	2	4+2	2	19+9	6
11	(Netherlands) Vivianne Miedema	9+2	4	1+3	2	5	3	15+5	9
14	(England) Jodie Taylor	2+1	2	0	0	2+1	3	4+2	5
15	(Republic of Ireland) Katie McCabe	6+5	2	3+2	0	0+1	0	9+8	2
18	(Scotland) Lisa Evans	15+3	2	3+2	0	5+1	1	23+6	3
22	(England) Lauren James	0+5	0	0+1	0	2+1	1	2+7	1
23	(England) Beth Mead	15+2	8	5	2	3+2	6	25+4	16
28	(England) Jessica Ngunga	0+2	0	0	0	0	0	0+2	0

=== Goalscorers ===
Rank	No.	Position	Name	WSL 1	FA Cup	WSL Cup	Total
1	23	FW	(England) Beth Mead	8	2	6	16
2	11	FW	(Netherlands) Vivianne Miedema	4	2	3	9
2	8	MF	(England) Jordan Nobbs	3	2	4	9
4	21	MF	(Netherlands) Daniëlle van de Donk	5	0	1	6
4	9	FW	(England) Danielle Carter	2	2	2	6
6	14	FW	(England) Jodie Taylor	2	0	3	5
7	20	MF	(Netherlands) Dominique Janssen	3	0	1	4
7	10	MF	(Scotland) Kim Little	3	0	1	4
7	4	DF	(Scotland) Emma Mitchell	1	0	3	4
10	18	FW	(Scotland) Lisa Evans	2	0	1	3
10	16	DF	(Republic of Ireland) Louise Quinn	1	1	1	3
12	15	FW	(Republic of Ireland) Katie McCabe	2	0	0	2
12	17	MF	(United States) Heather O'Reilly	1	1	0	2
14	6	DF	(England) Leah Williamson	1	0	0	1
14	22	FW	(England) Lauren James	0	0	1	1
Total				38	10	27	75

=== Disciplinary record ===
Rank	No.	Position	Name	WSL 1		FA Cup		WSL Cup		Total	
Rank	No.	Position	Name	Booked	Sent off (straight red)	Booked	Sent off (straight red)	Booked	Sent off (straight red)	Booked	Sent off (straight red)
1	16	DF	(Republic of Ireland) Louise Quinn	0	1	0	0	1	0	1	1
2	20	DF	(Netherlands) Dominique Janssen	1	0	1	0	1	0	3	0
3	18	FW	(Scotland) Lisa Evans	2	0	0	0	0	0	2	0
3	6	DF	(England) Leah Williamson	1	0	0	0	1	0	2	0
3	17	MF	(United States) Heather O'Reilly	1	0	1	0	0	0	2	0
6	1	GK	(Netherlands) Sari van Veenendaal	1	0	0	0	0	0	1	0
6	21	MF	(Netherlands) Daniëlle van de Donk	1	0	0	0	0	0	1	0
6	8	MF	(England) Jordan Nobbs	1	0	0	0	0	0	1	0
6	11	FW	(Netherlands) Vivianne Miedema	1	0	0	0	0	0	1	0
6	4	DF	(Scotland) Emma Mitchell	0	0	0	0	1	0	1	0
6	19	DF	(England) Jemma Rose	0	0	0	0	1	0	1	0
6	5	DF	(Germany) Josephine Henning	1	0	0	0	0	0	1	0
Total				10	1	2	0	5	0	17	1

=== Clean sheets ===
Rank	No.	Name	WSL 1	FA Cup	WSL Cup	Total
1	13	(England) Anna Moorhouse	3	3	2	8
2	1	(Netherlands) Sari van Veenendaal	5	0	1	6
Total			8	3	3	14

== Transfers, loans and other signings ==
=== Transfers in ===
Announcement date	No.	Position	Player	From club
23 May 2017	11	FW	(Netherlands) Vivianne Miedema	(Germany) Bayern Munich
29 June 2017	18	FW	(Scotland) Lisa Evans	(Germany) Bayern Munich
18 August 2017	25	DF	(Sweden) Jessica Samuelsson	(Sweden) Linköping FC
21 August 2017	5	DF	(Germany) Josephine Henning	(France) Lyon

=== Contract extensions ===
Announcement date	No.	Position	Player	At Arsenal since
29 August 2017	9	FW	(England) Danielle Carter	Homegrown

=== Transfers out ===
Announcement date	No.	Position	Player	To club
29 June 2017	11	MF	(England) Carla Humphrey	(England) Bristol City
30 June 2017	27	GK	(England) Sian Rogers	(England) Aston Villa
11 July 2017	26	FW	(England) Rianna Dean	(England) Millwall Lionesses
27 July 2017	28	MF	(England) Charlie Devlin	(England) Millwall Lionesses
16 August 2017	4	MF	(England) Fara Williams	(England) Reading
21 November 2017	14	FW	(England) Jodie Taylor	(Australia) Melbourne City
25 January 2018	7	FW	(England) Chloe Kelly	(England) Everton
25 January 2018	24	MF	(Jamaica) Taylor Hinds	(England) Everton
16 February 2018	19	DF	(England) Jemma Rose	N/A
16 February 2018	12	DF	(Jamaica) Vyan Sampson	(England) West Ham United

=== Loans out ===
Announcement date	No.	Position	Player	To club
1 August 2017	15	FW	(Republic of Ireland) Katie McCabe	(Scotland) Glasgow City
30 July 2017	7	FW	(England) Chloe Kelly	(England) Everton

== Club ==
=== Kit ===
Supplier: Puma / Sponsor: Fly Emirates

Home	Home alt. 1	Home alt. 2	Away

==== Kit usage ====
Kit	Combination	Usage	
Home	Red body; White sleeves; White shorts; White socks	WSL	Birmingham City (H); Manchester City (A); Bristol City (H); Everton (A); Sunderland (H); Chelsea (A); Yeovil Town (H); Everton (H); Chelsea (H); Reading (H); Yeovil Town (A); Liverpool (H); Birmingham City (A); Manchester City (H)
Home	Red body; White sleeves; White shorts; White socks	FA Cup	Yeovil Town (A); Millwall (H); Charlton Athletic (H)
Home	Red body; White sleeves; White shorts; White socks	WSL Cup	London Bees (H); Millwall (A); Reading (H); Watford (A); Sunderland (H); Manchester City (N)
Home alt. 1	Red body; White sleeves; White shorts; Red socks	FA Cup	Everton (A); Chelsea (N)
Home alt. 2	Red body; White sleeves; Red shorts; Red socks	WSL	Reading (A)
Home alt. 2	Red body; White sleeves; Red shorts; Red socks	WSL Cup	Reading (A)
Away	Blue body; Blue sleeves; Blue shorts; Blue socks	WSL	Liverpool (A); Yeovil Town (A); Sunderland (A); Bristol City (A)

== Non-competitive ==
=== Pre-season ===
23 August 2017	Turbine Potsdam	3–0	Arsenal	Potsdam
17:00 BST		Report		Stadium: Karl-Liebknecht-Stadion

31 August 2017	Arsenal	3–0	Everton	Borehamwood
19:30 GMT (UTC+0)	Nobbs 15'; Taylor 20'; Carter 36'	Report		Stadium: Meadow Park

== Competitions ==
=== Overall record ===
Competition	First match	Last match	Starting round	Final position	Record							
Competition	First match	Last match	Starting round	Final position	Pld	W	D	L	GF	GA	GD	Win %
FA WSL 1	24 September 2017	20 May 2018	Matchday 1	3rd	18	11	4	3	38	18	+20	61.11
Women's FA Cup	4 February 2018	5 May 2018	Fourth round	Runners-up	5	4	0	1	12	4	+8	80.00
FA WSL Cup	12 October 2017	14 March 2018	Group stage	Winners	7	6	0	1	26	7	+19	85.71
Total					30	21	4	5	76	29	+47	70.00

Source: FA WSL

=== League table ===
Pos	Team	Pld	W	D	L	GF	GA	GD	Pts	Qualification
1	Chelsea (C)	18	13	5	0	44	13	+31	44	Qualification for the Champions League knockout phase
2	Manchester City	18	12	2	4	51	17	+34	38	Qualification for the Champions League knockout phase
3	Arsenal	18	11	4	3	38	18	+20	37	
4	Reading	18	9	5	4	40	18	+22	32	
5	Birmingham City	18	9	3	6	30	18	+12	30	

Source: FA WSL
Rules for classification: 1) Points; 2) Goal difference; 3) Number of goals scored
(C) Champions

=== Results summary ===
Overall								Home						Away					
Pld	W	D	L	GF	GA	GD	Pts	W	D	L	GF	GA	GD	W	D	L	GF	GA	GD
18	11	4	3	38	18	+20	37	7	2	0	21	6	+15	4	2	3	17	12	+5

Last updated: 20 May 2018.
Source: FA WSL

=== Results by matchday ===
Matchday	1	2	3	4	5	6	7	8	9	10	11	12	13	14	15	16	17	18
Ground	H	A	H	A	H	A	A	A	H	H	H	H	A	H	A	H	A	A
Result	W	L	D	W	W	L	D	W	W	W	D	W	D	W	L	W	W	W
Position	1	3	4	3	3	4	4	4	3	3	4	3	3	3	3	3	3	3

Updated to match(es) played on 20 May 2018. Source: FA WSL
W = Win; D = Draw; L = Loss

==== Matches ====
24 September 2017 1	Arsenal	3–2	Birmingham City	Borehamwood
14:00 BST	Taylor 35', 90' (pen.); Henning (yellow card) 65'; Quinn (red card) 80'; Evans 84'	Report	White 13', 59'; Harrop (yellow card) 86'; Mannion (yellow card) 86'	Stadium: Meadow Park; Referee: Abigail Byrne

30 September 2017 2	Manchester City	5–2	Arsenal	Manchester
12:30 BST	Ross 40'; Houghton 45+3'; Stanway 70'; Christiansen 74'; Scott 80'	Report	O'Reilly (yellow card) 44' (goal) 47'; Mitchell 45+1'	Stadium: Academy Stadium; Attendance: 1,646; Referee: Amy Rayner Fearn

8 October 2017 3	Arsenal	1–1	Bristol City	Borehamwood
12:30 BST	Van de Donk 50'	Report	Hemp 30'; Brown (yellow card) 70'; Biesmans (yellow card) 90+1'	Stadium: Meadow Park; Referee: Sarah Garratt

29 October 2017 4	Everton	0–2	Arsenal	Widnes
14:00 GMT		Report	Miedema 23'; Mead 78'	Stadium: Halton Stadium; Attendance: 435; Referee: Lindsey Robinson

12 November 2017 5	Arsenal	3–0	Sunderland	Borehamwood
14:00 GMT	Quinn 58'; Miedema 68'; Nobbs 76'	Report	Williams (yellow card) 41'; Sjoman (yellow card) 58'	Stadium: Meadow Park; Attendance: 400; Referee: Lloyd Wood

7 January 2018 6	Chelsea	3–2	Arsenal	Kingston Upon Thames
13:30 GMT	Mjelde 23'; Ji 60'; Van Veenendaal 83' (o.g.)	Report	Miedema 56'; Janssen 63'	Stadium: Kingsmeadow; Attendance: 2,570; Referee: Adrian Quelch

28 January 2018 7	Reading	0–0	Arsenal	High Wycombe
14:00 GMT	Rowe (yellow card) 25'; Furness (yellow card) 84'	Report	Miedema (yellow card) 62'; Evans (yellow card) 73'; Nobbs (yellow card) 74'	Stadium: Adams Park; Attendance: 690; Referee: Helen Byrne

7 February 2018 8	Liverpool	0–3	Arsenal	Widnes
19:00 GMT		Report	Miedema (penalty missed) 29' 29'; Janssen 45'; Evans 62'	Stadium: Halton Stadium; Attendance: 461; Referee: Rebecca Welch

11 February 2018 9	Arsenal	4–0	Yeovil Town	Borehamwood
14:00 GMT	Carter 37', 71'; Mead 48', 85'	Report		Stadium: Meadow Park; Attendance: 740; Referee: Sarah Garratt

23 February 2018 10	Arsenal	1–0	Everton	Borehamwood
19:30 GMT	Mead 38'; Van de Donk (yellow card) 88'; Van Veenendaal (yellow card) 90'	Report	Bryson (yellow card) 90+5'	Stadium: Meadow Park; Attendance: 813; Referee: Alan Dale

1 April 2018 11	Arsenal	1–1	Chelsea	Borehamwood
12:30 BST	Mead 45+1'	Report	Kirby 31'; Thorisdottir (yellow card) 88'	Stadium: Meadow Park; Attendance: 1,807; Referee: Paul Howard

18 April 2018 12	Arsenal	3–1	Reading	Borehamwood
19:30 BST	Little 8'; Janssen 27'; Van de Donk 64'; Williamson (yellow card) 83'	Report	Williams 50'; Harding (yellow card) 53'; Furness (yellow card) 74'; McGee (yellow card) 78'	Stadium: Meadow Park; Referee: Christopher ODonnell

21 April 2018 13	Yeovil Town	0–0	Arsenal	Weston-super-Mare
15:00 BST	Jones (yellow card) 77'	Report	Evans (yellow card) 78'	Stadium: Woodspring Stadium; Attendance: 317; Referee: Abigail Byrne

24 April 2018 14	Arsenal	3–0	Liverpool	Borehamwood
19:30 BST	McCabe 65'; Nobbs 74', 85'	Report		Stadium: Meadow Park; Referee: Ian Fissenden

29 April 2018 15	Birmingham City	3–0	Arsenal	Solihull
14:00 BST	White 10', 40', 86'; Mannion (penalty missed) 77'	Report	Janssen (yellow card) 57'	Stadium: Damson Park; Attendance: 921; Referee: Daniel Middleton

12 May 2018 16	Arsenal	2–1	Manchester City	Borehamwood
12:15 BST	Van de Donk 52'; Mead 62'	Report	Nadim 11'; Stanway (yellow card) 61'	Stadium: Meadow Park; Attendance: 1,514; Referee: Rebecca Welch

16 May 2018 17	Sunderland	0–2	Arsenal	South Shields
19:00 BST	Wyne (yellow card) 11'	Report	Little 9'; Mead 30'	Stadium: Mariners Park; Attendance: 321; Referee: John Matthews

20 May 2018 18	Bristol City	1–6	Arsenal	Stoke Gifford
12:30 BST	Arthur 67'	Report	Van de Donk 21', 71'; Little 28' (pen.); Williamson 30'; Mead 38'; McCabe 44'	Stadium: Stoke Gifford Stadium; Attendance: 724; Referee: Dale Wootton

=== FA Cup ===
4 February 2018 Fourth round	Yeovil Town	0–3	Arsenal	Weston-super-Mare
14:00 GMT (UTC+0)		Report	Nobbs 10'; Mead (penalty missed) 22' 45+2'; Carter (penalty missed) 44'; Miles 59' (o.g.)	Stadium: Woodspring Stadium; Attendance: 323; Referee: Daniel Lamport

18 February 2018 Fifth round	Arsenal	1–0	Millwall Lionesses	Borehamwood
14:00 GMT	Mead 32'	Report		Stadium: Meadow Park

25 March 2018 Quarter-finals	Arsenal	5–0	Charlton Athletic	Borehamwood
14:00 BST	Little 4' (pen.); O'Reilly 56'; Miedema 60'; Carter 85'; Nobbs 90'	Report		Stadium: Meadow Park; Referee: Paul Forrester

15 April 2018 Semi-Finals	Everton	1–2	Arsenal	Crosby
12:30 BST	Kelly 67' (pen.)	Report	Carter 25'; O'Reilly (yellow card) 69'; Quinn 90+1'	Stadium: Rossett Park; Attendance: 1,457; Referee: Abigail Marriott

5 May 2018 Final	Arsenal	1–3	Chelsea	Wembley Park
17:30 BST	Janssen (yellow card) 42'; Miedema 73'	Report	Bachmann 48', 60'; Kirby 76'	Stadium: Wembley Stadium; Attendance: 45,423; Referee: Lindsey Robinson

=== FA WSL Cup ===
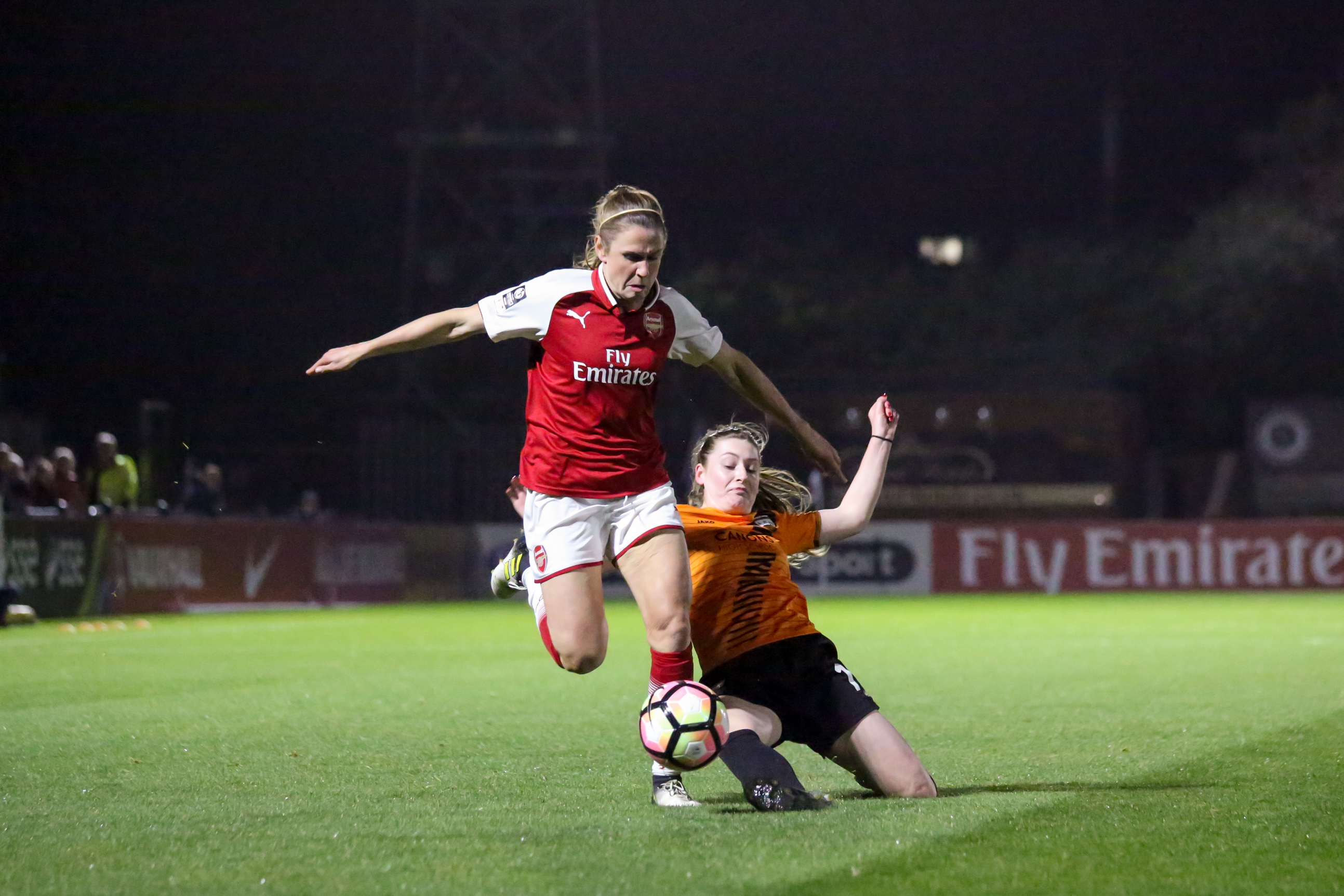
Group match between Arsenal and London Bees.

==== Group stage ====
Pos	Team	Pld	W	WPEN	LPEN	L	GF	GA	GD	Pts	Qualification	REA	ARS	WAT	MIL	LON
1	Reading	4	4	0	0	0	15	1	+14	12	Advance to knock-out stage	—	—	4–0	—	4–0
2	Arsenal	4	3	0	0	1	19	4	+15	9	Advance to knock-out stage	1–2	—	—	—	7–0
3	Watford	4	1	0	1	2	2	11	−9	4		—	0–6	—	1–0	—
4	Millwall Lionesses	4	1	0	0	3	6	14	−8	3		0–5	2–5	—	—	—
5	London Bees	4	0	1	0	3	4	16	−12	2		—	—	1–1	3–4	—

Source: FA WSL
Rules for classification: 1) Points; 2) Goal difference; 3) Number of goals scored

12 October 2017 1	Arsenal	7–0	London Bees	Borehamwood
19:30 BST	Evans 24'; Mitchell 34', 37'; Taylor 52'; Williamson (yellow card) 54'; Mead 58' (pen.), 78' (pen.); Quinn 83'	Report	Lane (yellow card) 75'	Stadium: Meadow Park

1 November 2017 2	Millwall Lionesses	2–5	Arsenal	Rotherhithe
19:45 GMT	Mason 20'; Hincks (yellow card) 66'; Rutherford 69'; Wynne (yellow card) 70'	Report	Mead 11'; Nobbs 43', 74'; Carter 78'; James 90' (pen.)	Stadium: St Pauls Sports Ground; Attendance: 451

5 November 2017 3	Arsenal	1–2	Reading	Borehamwood
14:00 GMT	Quinn (yellow card) 49'; Mead 61'	Report	Bruton (yellow card) 29'; Allen (yellow card) 33'; Williams 54', 62'	Stadium: Meadow Park

16 November 2017 4	Watford	0–6	Arsenal	Kings Langley
19:45 GMT	Maple (yellow card) 22'; Murray (yellow card) 63'; Will (yellow card) 85'	Report	Taylor 15', 78'; Carter 46'; Mitchell 60'; Janssen 74'; Van de Donk 75'	Stadium: Gaywood Park

==== Knockout rounds ====
17 December 2017 Quarter-finals	Arsenal	3–1	Sunderland	Borehamwood
14:00 GMT	Nobbs 15'; Miedema 38'; Mead 75'	Report	Galloway 55'; Bruinenberg (yellow card) 67'	Stadium: Meadow Park; Attendance: 400; Referee: Josh Smith

14 January 2018 Semi-finals	Reading	2–3	Arsenal	High Wycombe
14:00 GMT	Chaplen 7'; Bruton 70'; Moloney (yellow card) 79'	Report	Mead 5'; Rose (yellow card) 55'; Miedema 80'; Nobbs 83'	Stadium: Adams Park; Attendance: 749; Referee: Ryan Atkin

14 March 2018 Final	Arsenal	1–0	Manchester City	High Wycombe
19:00 GMT	Mitchell (yellow card) 30'; Miedema 32'; Janssen (yellow card) 36'	Report		Stadium: Adams Park; Attendance: 2,136; Referee: Amy Fearn (Derbyshire)

== See also ==
- 2017–18 in English football
- List of Arsenal W.F.C. seasons
