= 2015 FA WSL Cup final =

- Event: 2015 FA WSL Cup
Arsenal	Notts County
3	0
- Date: 1 November 2015
- Venue: Aesseal New York Stadium, Rotherham
- Referee: Jane Simms
- Attendance: 5,028

The 2015 FA WSL Cup final was the fifth final of the FA WSL Cup, England's secondary cup competition for women's football teams and its primary league cup tournament. Arsenal beat Notts County 3-0.

== Match ==
=== Details ===
1 November 2015
15:00 GMT (UTC±00:00)

Arsenal	3–0	Notts County
Nobbs 26', 41'; Ubogagu 90+2'	Report

New York Stadium, Rotherham
Attendance: 5,028
Referee: Jane Simms

Arsenal	Notts County

GK	13	(Netherlands) Sari van Veenendaal
LB	20	(Netherlands) Dominique Janssen
LCB	19	(England) Jemma Rose
RCB	5	(England) Casey Stoney (c)
RB	14	(England) Leah Williamson
CDM	25	(Jamaica) Jade Bailey
LW	11	(England) Rachel Yankey		(substituted off) 89'
LCM	6	(Spain) Vicky Losada
RCM	8	(England) Jordan Nobbs
RW	17	(Spain) Marta Corredera	(yellow card) 61'	(substituted off) 86'
FW	7	(Spain) Natalia Pablos		(substituted off) 75'
Substitutes:
GK	1	(Republic of Ireland) Emma Byrne
FW	12	(England) Chioma Ubogagu		(substituted on) 75'
FW	18	(England) Chloe Kelly	(yellow card) 90'	(substituted on) 86'
DF	4	(Jamaica) Vyan Sampson		(substituted on) 89'
MF	16	(England) Carla Humphrey
DF	24	(England) Lotte Wubben-Moy
MF	30	(England) Georgia Allen
Manager:
(Spain) Pedro Martinez Losa

GK	1	(England) Carly Telford
LB	15	(England) Amy Turner
LCB	3	(England) Alex Greenwood	(yellow card) 32'
RCB	23	(England) Laura Bassett (c)	(red card) 34'
RB	14	(England) Sophie Walton		(substituted off) 66'
LCM	18	(Scotland) Leanne Crichton		(substituted off) 44'
CM	11	(Canada) Desiree Scott
RCM	4	(England) Danielle Buet
LW	8	(England) Rachel Williams		(substituted off) 84'
FW	7	(England) Jess Clarke
RW	9	(England) Ellen White
Substitutes:
GK	12	(England) Olivia Walker
DF	6	(England) Fern Whelan		(substituted on) 44'
MF	20	(England) Aileen Whelan	(yellow card) 77'	(substituted on) 66'
DF	30	(England) Laura-Jayne O’Neill		(substituted on) 84'
DF	19	(Nigeria) Ashleigh Plumptre
DF	25	(England) Alice Hassall
Manager:
(England) Rick Passmoor

Player of the match
Assistant referees:

Fourth official:

Match rules

- 90 minutes.
- 30 minutes of extra-time if necessary.
- Penalty shoot-out if scores still level.
- Seven named substitutes.
- Maximum of three substitutions.
