= 2015 FA WSL Cup =

Tournament details
- Country: England
- Dates: 21 July 2015 – 1 November 2015
- Teams: 18

Final positions
- Champions: Arsenal
- Runners-up: Notts County

Tournament statistics
- Matches played: 52
- Goals scored: 199 (3.83 per match)
- Attendance: 32,783 (630 per match)
- Top goal scorer: (England) Natasha Dowie Liverpool (9 Goals)

The 2015 FA WSL Cup was the fifth edition of the FA WSL's league cup competition. It was sponsored by Continental AG, who sponsored the competition from its creation, and was officially known as the FA WSL Continental Tyres Cup. All 18 teams of the two divisions of the WSL took part in the competition.

Manchester City were the defending champions. Only they and Arsenal (who won the first three) had won the cup in the previous four seasons it was contested in.

All WSL 1 and WSL 2 teams took part. In addition to the previous season, a quarter-final round was added to the knock-out stage. The first match was played on 21 July 2015, after the WSL break for the 2015 FIFA Women's World Cup.

== Group stage ==
=== Group 1 ===
Pos	Team	Pld	W	D	L	GF	GA	GD	Pts	Qualification	ARS	CHE	REA	MIL	WAT	LON
1	Arsenal	5	5	0	0	14	2	+12	15	Advance to knock-out stage	—	—	2–1	—	3–0	—
2	Chelsea	5	4	0	1	20	4	+16	12	Advance to knock-out stage	0–2	—	—	6–0	—	8–0
3	Reading	5	3	0	2	12	7	+5	9	Advance to knock-out stage	—	2–3	—	—	—	3–0
4	Millwall Lionesses	5	2	0	3	10	18	−8	6		0–4	—	1–3	—	—	5–3
5	Watford	5	1	0	4	6	15	−9	3		—	0–3	1–3	2–4	—	—
6	London Bees	5	0	0	5	6	22	−16	0		1–3	—	—	—	2–3	—

Rules for classification: 1) Points; 2) Goal difference; 3) Number of goals scored
22 July 2015
19:00

Millwall Lionesses	5–3	London Bees
Gibbons 41', 44', 68'; Watling 64'; Babajide 84'	Report	Goddard 35'; Whitter 45', 45+2'

Eden Park Avenue, Beckenham
Attendance: 189
Referee: AJ Attbold
22 July 2015
19:00

Reading	2–3	Chelsea
Jane 45'; Bruton 57'	Report	Flaherty 43'; Bright 66'; So-yun 89'

Cherrywood Road, Farnborough
Attendance: 809
Referee: Samuel Ogles
23 July 2015
19:00

Arsenal	3–0	Watford
Williamson 16'; Kelly 22'; Yankey 30'

Meadow Park, Borehamwood
Attendance: 922

29 July 2015
19:00

London Bees	1–3	Arsenal
Gaylor 21'		Humphrey 62'; Pablos 65', 71'

The Hive Stadium, Canons Park
Attendance: 445
29 July 2015
19:00

Millwall Lionesses	1–3	Reading
Cole 5' (pen.)		Ward 19', 37'; Bruton 82'

Eden Park Avenue, Beckenham

12 August 2015
19:00

Watford	2–4	Millwall Lionesses
Nuttall 56'; Donnelly 80'	Report	Hincks 33'; Gibbons 45+2'; Lennon 59'; Babajide 90'

Broadwater, Berkhamsted
Attendance: 272
Referee: Lisa Benn
15 August 2015
15:00

Reading	3–0	London Bees
Roche 10'; Ward 36'; Bragg 81'

Cherrywood Road, Farnborough
16 August 2015
15:00

Chelsea	0–2	Arsenal
	Report	Corredera 18', 38'

Wheatsheaf Park, Staines upon Thames
Attendance: 1,419
Referee: Stephen Bates

19 August 2015
19:00

Watford	0–3	Chelsea
		Primus 32'; Brett 44'; Farrow 80'

Broadwater, Berkhamsted
Attendance: 330

26 August 2015
19:00

Chelsea	6–0	Millwall Lionesses
So-yun 19'; Coombs 22', 90+2'; Kirby 78', 83', 88'

Wheatsheaf Park, Staines upon Thames
Attendance: 507
27 August 2015
19:00

Arsenal	2–1	Reading
Stoney 45'; Losada 62'	Report	Watts 90'

Meadow Park, Borehamwood
Attendance: 873
Referee: Lucy Oliver

30 August 2015
15:00

Millwall Lionesses	0–4	Arsenal
	Report	Carter 10'; Yankey 12'; Kelly 15'; Janssen 74'

Eden Park Avenue, Beckenham
Attendance: 203
Referee: Paula Wyatt
30 August 2015
15:00

Chelsea	8–0	London Bees
Banusic 16', 23', 35'; Rafferty 31'; Ayane 55', 60', 64', 67'

Wheatsheaf Park, Staines upon Thames
Attendance: 597
30 August 2015
15:00

Watford	1–3	Reading
Donnelly 26'		Walkley 3'; Bragg 9'; Follis 49'

Broadwater, Berkhamsted

20 September 2015
15:00

London Bees	2–3	Watford
Fraser 48'; Bowers 75'		Mason 20'; Nuttall 27'; Gould 59'

The Hive, Canons Park

=== Group 2 ===
Pos	Team	Pld	W	D	L	GF	GA	GD	Pts	Qualification	MCI	LIV	DON	SUN	EVE	DUR
1	Manchester City	5	5	0	0	15	1	+14	15	Advance to knock-out stage	—	2–0	—	—	—	5–0
2	Liverpool	5	4	0	1	8	2	+6	12	Advance to knock-out stage	—	—	—	2–0	—	1–0
3	Doncaster Rovers Belles	5	3	0	2	11	10	+1	9		0–3	0–3	—	—	—	5–0
4	Sunderland	5	2	0	3	10	11	−1	6		1–3	—	2–3	—	5–2	—
5	Everton	5	1	0	4	6	12	−6	3		0–2	0–2	2–3	—	—	—
6	Durham	5	0	0	5	1	15	−14	0		—	—	—	1–2	0–2	—

Updated to match(es) played on 30 August 2015. Source: FA WSL
Rules for classification: 1) Points; 2) Goal difference; 3) Number of goals scored
22 July 2015
19:00

Durham	1–2	Sunderland
Wilson 84'	Report	Ramshaw 76'; Moorhouse 90+1' (o.g.)

New Ferens Park, Durham
Attendance: 793
Referee: Matthew Diccio
23 July 2015
19:00

Doncaster Rovers Belles	0–3	Manchester City
	Report	Christiansen 48'; Parris 68'; Duggan 83'

Keepmoat Stadium, Doncaster
Attendance: 1,274
23 July 2015
19:30

Everton	0–2	Liverpool
	Report	Dowie 1', 55'

Select Security Stadium, Widnes
Attendance: 1,073

29 July 2015
19:00

Manchester City	5–0	Durham
Johnston 12', 87'; Parris 24', 41'; Christiansen 30'	Report

Academy Stadium, Manchester
Attendance: 1,185
Referee: Barry Lamb
29 July 2015
19:00

Sunderland	5–2	Everton
Mead 12', 16'; Kelly 31', 56'; Zambra 47'		Hollinshead 14'; Hinnigan 48'

Eppleton Colliery Welfare Ground, Hetton-le-Hole
Attendance: 558
30 July 2015

Doncaster Rovers Belles	0–3	Liverpool
		Dowie 13'; Staniforth 30'; Hodson 81'

Keepmoat Stadium, Doncaster
Attendance: 807

15 August 2015
15:00

Sunderland	1–3	Manchester City
Wilson 23'	Report	Parris 11'; Houghton 15'; Duggan 90'

Eppleton Colliery Welfare Ground, Hetton-le-Hole
Attendance: 1,514
15 August 2015
15:00

Liverpool	1–0	Durham
Dowie 66'	Report

Select Security Stadium, Widnes
Attendance: 493
Referee: A Smith
16 August 2015
15:00

Everton	2–3	Doncaster Rovers Belles
Hollinshead 5'; Stewart 23'		Sweetman-Kirk 67', 74', 85'

Select Security Stadium, Widnes

26 August 2015
19:00

Liverpool	2–0	Sunderland
Dowie 60'; Omarsdottir 90'

Select Security Stadium, Widnes
Attendance: 482
27 August 2015
19:00

Everton	0–2	Manchester City
	Report	Duggan 19'; Stanway 88'

Select Security Stadium, Widnes
Attendance: 526
Referee: Scott Simpson
27 August 2015
19:00

Doncaster Rovers Belles	5–0	Durham
Roberts 32'; Sweetman-Kirk 41'; Smith 79'; Simpkins 85', 85'

Keepmoat Stadium, Doncaster

30 August 2015
15:00

Manchester City	2–0	Liverpool
Duggan 15' (pen.); Christiansen 71'	Report

Academy Stadium, Manchester
Attendance: 1,890
Referee: James Bell
30 August 2015
15:00

Sunderland	2–3	Doncaster Rovers Belles
Joice 47'; Robson 90'		Roberts 29'; England 63'; Sweetman-Kirk 80'

Eppleton Colliery Welfare Ground, Hetton-le-Hole
Attendance: 651
30 August 2015
15:00

Durham	0–2	Everton
		Jones 62'; Johnson 90+1'

New Ferens Park, Durham
Attendance: 209

=== Group 3 ===
Pos	Team	Pld	W	D	L	GF	GA	GD	Pts	Qualification	NTC	BIR	BRI	YEO	AST	OXF
1	Notts County	5	5	0	0	19	2	+17	15	Advance to knock-out stage	—	2–1	1–0	5–0	—	—
2	Birmingham City	5	4	0	1	17	3	+14	12	Advance to knock-out stage	—	—	—	4–0	—	3–0
3	Bristol Academy	5	3	0	2	10	5	+5	9	Advance to knock-out stage	—	0–2	—	—	—	3–2
4	Yeovil Town	5	2	0	3	4	13	−9	6		—	—	0–3	—	3–1	—
5	Aston Villa	5	1	0	4	5	20	−15	3		0–5	1–7	0–4	—	—	—
6	Oxford United	5	0	0	5	4	16	−12	0		1–6	—	—	0–1	1–3	—

Updated to match(es) played on 30 August 2015. Source: FA WSL
Rules for classification: 1) Points; 2) Goal difference; 3) Number of goals scored
21 July 2015
19:00

Aston Villa	0–4	Bristol Academy
		Weir 27'; Lawrence 57'; Boho 82', 85'

Coles Lane, Sutton Coldfield
Attendance: 300
22 July 2015
19:00

Notts County	2–1	Birmingham City
Clarke 14'; Whelan 90+4'		Allen 43'

Meadow Lane, Nottingham
Attendance: 879
23 July 2015

Oxford United	0–1	Yeovil Town
	Report	Hill 14'

Northcourt Road, Abingdon
Attendance: 312

30 July 2015
19:00

Aston Villa	1–7	Birmingham City
Wilkinson 87'		Allen 26', 59'; Linnett 41'; Carney 45'; Potter 67', 72'; Wellings 90+1'

Trevor Brown Memorial Ground, Boldmere
Attendance: 963
30 July 2015
19:00

Yeovil Town	0–3	Bristol Academy
		Passariello 12'; Weir 26'; Murray 77'

Raleigh Grove, Sherborne
Attendance: 522

16 August 2015
15:00

Birmingham City	3–0	Oxford United
Lawley 31'; Ayisi 52'; Linnett 67'	Report

Damson Park, Solihull
Attendance: 336
16 August 2015
15:00

Yeovil Town	3–1	Aston Villa
Hinchcliffe 17'; Cousins 76'; Heatherson 90+1'		Fergusson 30'

Raleigh Grove, Sherborne
16 August 2015
15:00

Notts County	1–0	Bristol Academy
Williams 8'

Meadow Lane, Nottingham
Attendance: 490

19 August 2015
19:00

Oxford United	1–6	Notts County
King 83'	Report	Clarke 31', 45+1', 60'; Williams 36'; Lambourne 63' (o.g.); White 85'

Northcourt Road, Abingdon
Attendance: 282

26 August 2015
19:00

Aston Villa	0–5	Notts County
		Clarke 14', 81'; White 24'; Bowman 86'; Williams 90'

Coles Lane, Sutton Coldfield
Attendance: 223
26 August 2015
19:00

Birmingham City	4–0	Yeovil Town
Potter 5'; Haines 7'; Wellings 29'; Linnett 60'

Damson Park, Solihull
Attendance: 321
27 August 2015
19:00

Bristol Academy	3–2	Oxford United
Boho 30', 72' (pen.); Weir 50'	Report	Allison 23', 73'

Stoke Gifford Stadium, Filton
Attendance: 413
Referee: Steven Plane

29 August 2015
15:00

Bristol Academy	0–2	Birmingham City
		Haines 17'; Potter 81'

Stoke Gifford Stadium, Filton
Attendance: 442
30 August 2015
15:00

Notts County	5–0	Yeovil Town
White 30', 88'; Greenwood 44'; Williams 55'; Plumptre 70'

Meadow Lane, Nottingham
Attendance: 592
30 August 2015

Oxford United	1–3	Aston Villa
Chivers 3'	Report	Merrick 45', 62'; West 85'

Northcourt Road, Abingdon
Attendance: 413

== Knock-out stage ==
=== Bracket ===
Quarter-finals
13 September
Bristol Academy	1
Liverpool	4
13 September
Notts County	3
Reading	2
1 October
Arsenal	1
Manchester City	0
13 September
Birmingham City	1
Chelsea	0

Semi-finals
11 October
Liverpool	0
Notts County	2
11 October
Arsenal	3
Birmingham City	1

Final
1 November
Notts County	0
Arsenal	3

=== Quarter-finals ===
Reading were the only WSL 2 team to progress from the group stages. The quarter-finals were drawn on 1 September 2015.

Team 1	Score	Team 2
13 September 2015
Bristol Academy	1–4	Liverpool
Notts County	3–2	Reading
Birmingham City	1–0	Chelsea
1 October 2015
Arsenal	1–0	Manchester City

13 September 2015
14:00 BST (UTC+01:00)

Bristol Academy	1–4	Liverpool
Boho 38'	Report	Dowie 35' (pen.), 56', 67', 90+3'

Stoke Gifford Stadium, Filton
Attendance: 371
Referee: Samuel Allison

13 September 2015
14:00 BST (UTC+01:00)

Notts County	3–2	Reading
Whelan 34'; Greenwood 38' (pen.), 88'	Report	Ward 35'; Fletcher 67'

Meadow Lane, Nottingham
Attendance: 649
Referee: Akil Howson

13 September 2015
14:00 BST (UTC+01:00)

Birmingham City	1–0	Chelsea
Potter 53'	Report

Damson Park, Solihull
Attendance: 516
Referee: Mark Griffiths

1 October 2015
19:45 BST (UTC+01:00)

Arsenal	1–0	Manchester City
Natalia 34'	Report

Meadow Park, Borehamwood
Attendance: 720
Referee: Josh Smith

=== Semi-finals ===
Team 1	Score	Team 2
Arsenal	3–1	Birmingham City
Liverpool	0–2	Notts County

11 October 2015
15:00 BST (UTC+01:00)

Arsenal	3–1	Birmingham City
Corredera 13'; Carter 14'; Scott 47'	Report	Linnett 58'

Meadow Park, Borehamwood
Attendance: 782
Referee: Nigel Lugg

11 October 2015
18:30 BST (UTC+01:00)

Liverpool	0–2	Notts County
	Report	White 5', 23'

Select Security Stadium, Widnes
Attendance: 538
Referee: Ian Hussin

=== Final ===
Team 1	Score	Team 2
Notts County	0–3	Arsenal

1 November 2015
15:00 GMT (UTC±00:00)

Notts County	0–3	Arsenal
	Report	Nobbs 26', 41'; Ubogagu 90+2'

New York Stadium, Rotherham
Attendance: 5,028
Referee: Jane Simms

== Top goalscorers ==
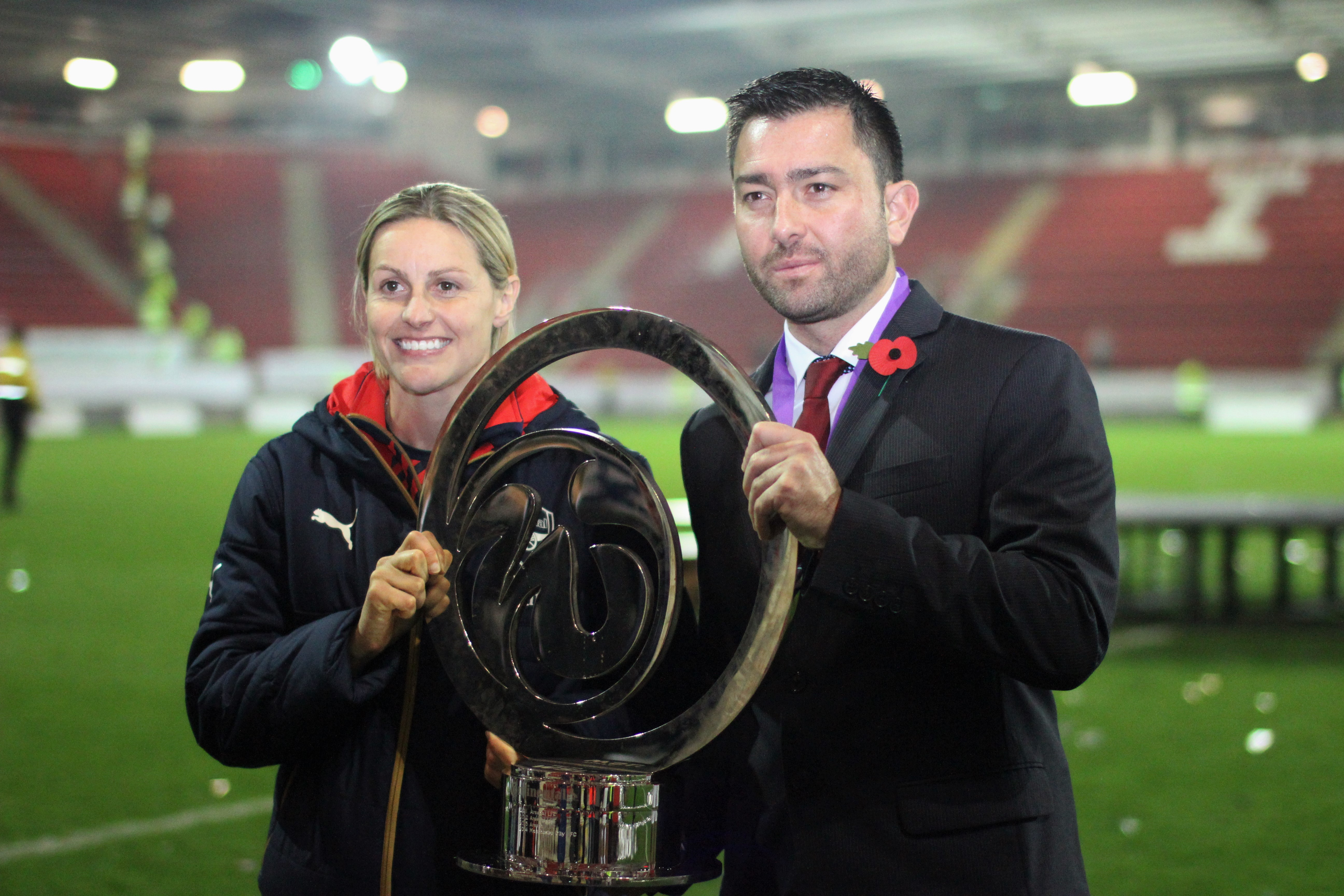
Pedro Martínez Losa and Kelly Smith with the FA WSL Cup, 2015

As of 19 October 2015

Rank	Player	Team	Goals
1	(England) Natasha Dowie	Liverpool	9
2	(England) Jess Clarke	Notts County	6
2	(England) Ellen White	Notts County	6
4	(Equatorial Guinea) Jade Boho	Bristol Academy	5
4	(England) Courtney Sweetman-Kirk	Doncaster Rovers Belles	5
6	(Morocco) Rosella Ayane	Chelsea	4
6	(England) Fliss Gibbons	Millwall Lionesses	4
6	(England) Kirsty Linnett	Birmingham City	4
6	(England) Jo Potter	Birmingham City	4
6	(Wales) Helen Ward	Reading	4
6	(England) Rachel Williams	Notts County	4

== See also ==
- 2015 FA WSL 1
- 2015 FA WSL 2
