= 2014 FA WSL Cup final =

- Event: 2014 FA WSL Cup
Arsenal	Manchester City
0	1
- Date: 16 October 2014
- Venue: Adams Park, Wycombe
- Player of the Match: Steph Houghton (Manchester City)
- Referee: Nigel Lugg (Surrey)
- Attendance: 3,697

The 2014 FA WSL Cup final was the fourth final of the FA WSL Cup, England's secondary cup competition for women's football teams and its primary league cup tournament. Manchester City beat Arsenal 1-0.

== Match ==
=== Details ===
16 October 2014
19:45 BST

Arsenal	0–1	Manchester City
	Report	Christiansen 73'

Adams Park, High Wycombe
Attendance: 3,697
Referee: Nigel Lugg (Surrey)

Arsenal	Manchester City

GK	1	(Republic of Ireland) Emma Byrne
LB	3	(Scotland) Emma Mitchell
LCB	19	(Republic of Ireland) Niamh Fahey	(yellow card) 65'
RCB	5	(England) Casey Stoney
RCB	2	(England) Alex Scott (c)
LCM	14	(England) Leah Williamson	(yellow card) 77'
CDM	4	(Japan) Yukari Kinga		(substituted off) 62'
RCM	8	(England) Jordan Nobbs
LW	11	(England) Rachel Yankey
FW	9	(England) Danielle Carter
RW	7	(Japan) Shinobu Ohno		(substituted off) 79'
Substitutes:
GK	15	(England) Siobhan Chamberlain
DF	25	(Jamaica) Jade Bailey
DF	26	(Jamaica) Vyan Simpson
MF	16	(Scotland) Christie Murray
MF	29	(Scotland) Caroline Weir
FW	10	(England) Kelly Smith		(substituted on) 62'
FW	24	(Ghana) Freda Ayisi		(substituted on) 79'
Manager:
(Spain) Pedro Martinez Losa

GK	1	(England) Karen Bardsley
LB	20	(England) Georgia Brougham
LCB	16	(Malta) Emma Lipman	(substituted off) 62'
RCB	6	(England) Steph Houghton (c)
RB	14	(England) Nicola Harding
LCM	8	(England) Jill Scott
RCM	24	(England) Keira Walsh
LW	9	(England) Toni Duggan
CAM	7	(England) Krystal Johnston
RW	11	(England) Izzy Christiansen
FW	19	(England) Natasha Flint
Substitutes:
GK	13	(England) Alexandra Brooks
DF	33	(Germany) Kathleen Radtke	(substituted on) 62'
DF	15	(England) Chelsea Nightingale
MF	12	(New Zealand) Betsy Hassett
FW	22	(New Zealand) Emma Kete
FW	18	(England) Danielle Young
Manager:
(England) Nick Cushing

Player of the match
Steph Houghton (Manchester City)

Assistant referees:
Stephen Bates (Hertfordshire)
Alexander Hardman (Gloucestershire)

Fourth official:
Tim Donnelly (Bedfordshire)

Match rules

- 90 minutes.
- 30 minutes of extra-time if necessary.
- Penalty shoot-out if scores still level.
- Seven named substitutes.
- Maximum of three substitutions.
