= Hilde Gunn Olsen =

Norwegian footballer (born 1992)

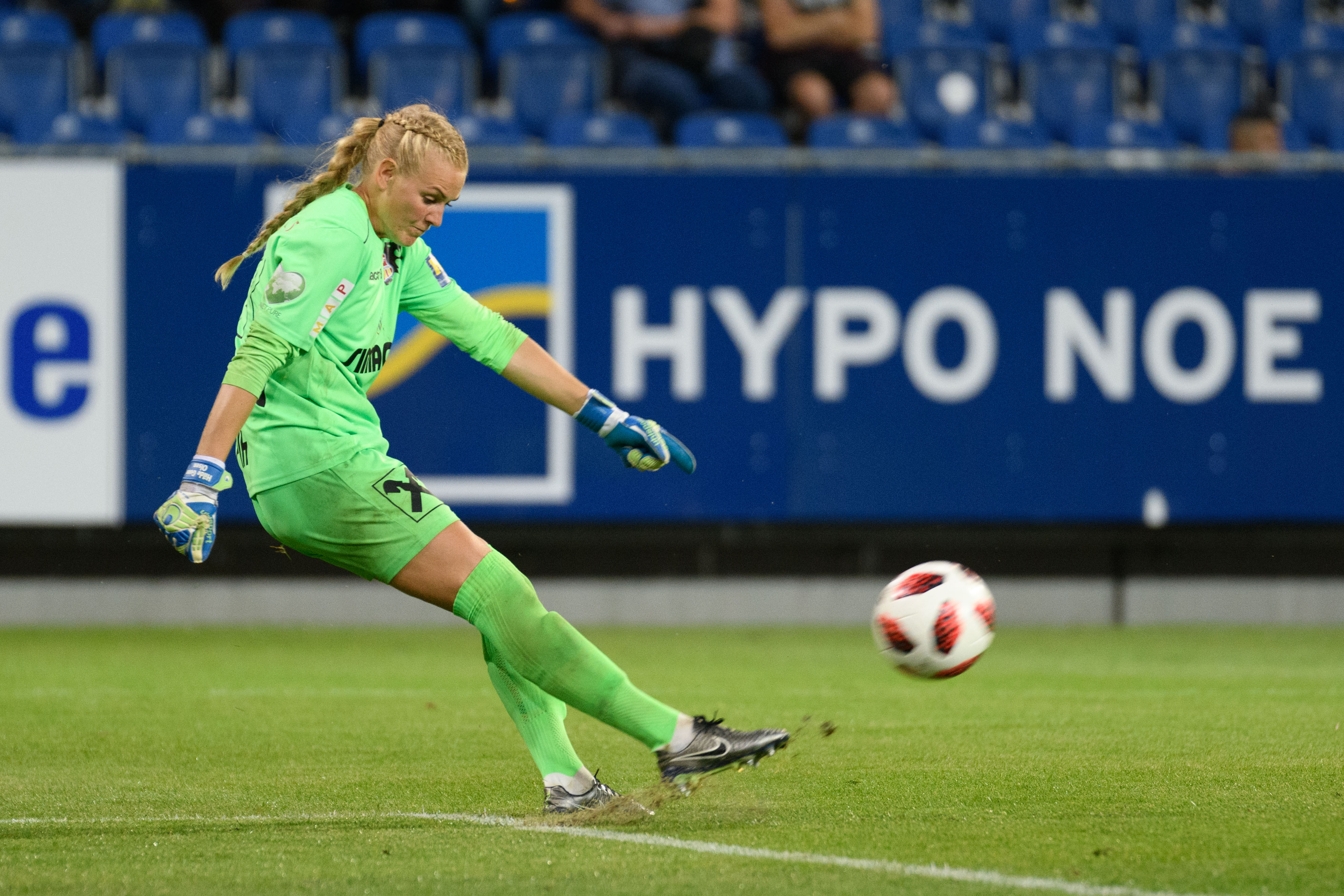
- Olsen in 2018 whilst playing for SKN St. Pölten

Personal information
- Date of birth: 2 March 1992 (age 34)
- Place of birth: Norway
- Height: 1.74 m (5 ft 9 in)
- Position: Goalkeeper

Team information
- Current team: Amazon Grimstad
- Number: 1

Senior career*
Years	Team	Apps	(Gls)
- Fløy
2012	Klepp	22	(0)
2013	Amazon Grimstad	5	(0)
2013	Røa	12	(0)
2014	AIK	10	(0)
2014	Linköping	3	(0)
2015	Arna-Bjørnar	6	(0)
2015–2017	Sunderland	11	(0)
2017–	Ayia Napa		
2018	Lyn	3	(0)
2018–2019	St. Pölten		
2019	Amazon Grimstad	1	(0)
2019	Kolbotn	7	(0)
2021–	Amazon Grimstad	1	(0)

International career
2007	Norway U15	1	(0)
2008	Norway U16	3	(0)
2009	Norway U17	2	(0)
2012	Norway U20	1	(0)
2012–2014	Norway U23	6	(0)
- * Club domestic league appearances and goals as of 11 August 2021

Hilde Gunn Olsen (born 2 March 1992) is a Norwegian footballer, who currently plays as a goalkeeper for Amazon Grimstad.

== Personal life ==
Olsen is from Flekkerøy in Kristiansand.

== Career ==
She first played internationally as an under-15, and continued to feature for Norway through U23 level.

Olsen has played for Amazon Grimstad, AIK Fotboll Dam, Klepp IL, Røa IL and Fløy. Olsen made two appearances for Swedish club Linköpings FC in the 2014–15 UEFA Women's Champions League. In June 2015, Olsen terminated her contract with Arna Biørnar by mutual consent. In July, during the FA Women's League mid-season break, she signed for Sunderland. In September 2017, Olsen transferred to Ayia Napa FC. In 2018, whilst playing for Lyn, she refused to support a gay pride initiative in which players held up posters before a Toppserien match with Vålerenga. She was the only player who refused. In 2019, Olsen signed for Norwegian club Kolbotn. In 2021, Olsen played for Amazon Grimstad, and in August 2021, she played against her sister Karen Andrea Olsen, who was goalkeeper for Gimletroll.
