= Ismael García Gómez =

Spanish football coach

Personal information
- Full name: Ismael García Gómez
- Date of birth: 1 June 1988 (age 38)
- Place of birth: Ourense, Galicia, Spain

Team information
- Current team: Galatasaray (Assistant Coach)

Managerial career
- Years: Team
- 2009–2013: Deportivo de La Coruña (scout)
- 2013–2014: Murense FC
- 2014–2016: Fundación Real Madrid
- 2016–2017: L'Hospitalet
- 2017–2018: Arsenal W.F.C. (assistant coach)
- 2018–2019: Deportivo de La Coruña (scout)
- 2019–2020: Asteras (assistant coach)
- 2020–2022: Udinese (assistant coach)
- 2022–: Galatasaray (assistant coach)

Ismael García Gómez (Orense, June 1, 1988) is a Spanish football coach.

He graduated in Physical Activity and Sports Sciences from the University of La Coruña and obtained the title of national football coach (Level 3 - UEFA PRO) in 2012 from the Royal Spanish Football Federation.

== Coaching career ==
=== Deportivo de La Coruña ===
Ismael was in the Deportivo de La Coruña youth system from the 2009 to 2013 seasons. He also worked in the scouting department of the first team's technical secretariat.

=== Fundación Real Madrid ===
In October 2014, he was hired as a football coach for the Real Madrid Foundation's training academy in Singapore. He remained there until June 2016. He also participated in several football clinics in different countries in Asia and Oceania.

=== L'Hospitalet ===
On 6 July 2016, he was appointed head coach of CE L'Hospitalet, the youngest in the division. After a draw against Espanyol B, and two points away from safety, García left Hospitalet's position by mutual consent.

=== Galatasaray ===
He has been the assistant coach of Galatasaray coach Okan Buruk since August 5, 2022.

== Honours ==
=== Coach ===
Galatasaray

- Süper Lig: 2022–23, 2023–24, 2024–25, 2025–26
- Turkish Cup: 2024–25
- Turkish Super Cup: 2023
