= Amber Gaylor =

English footballer

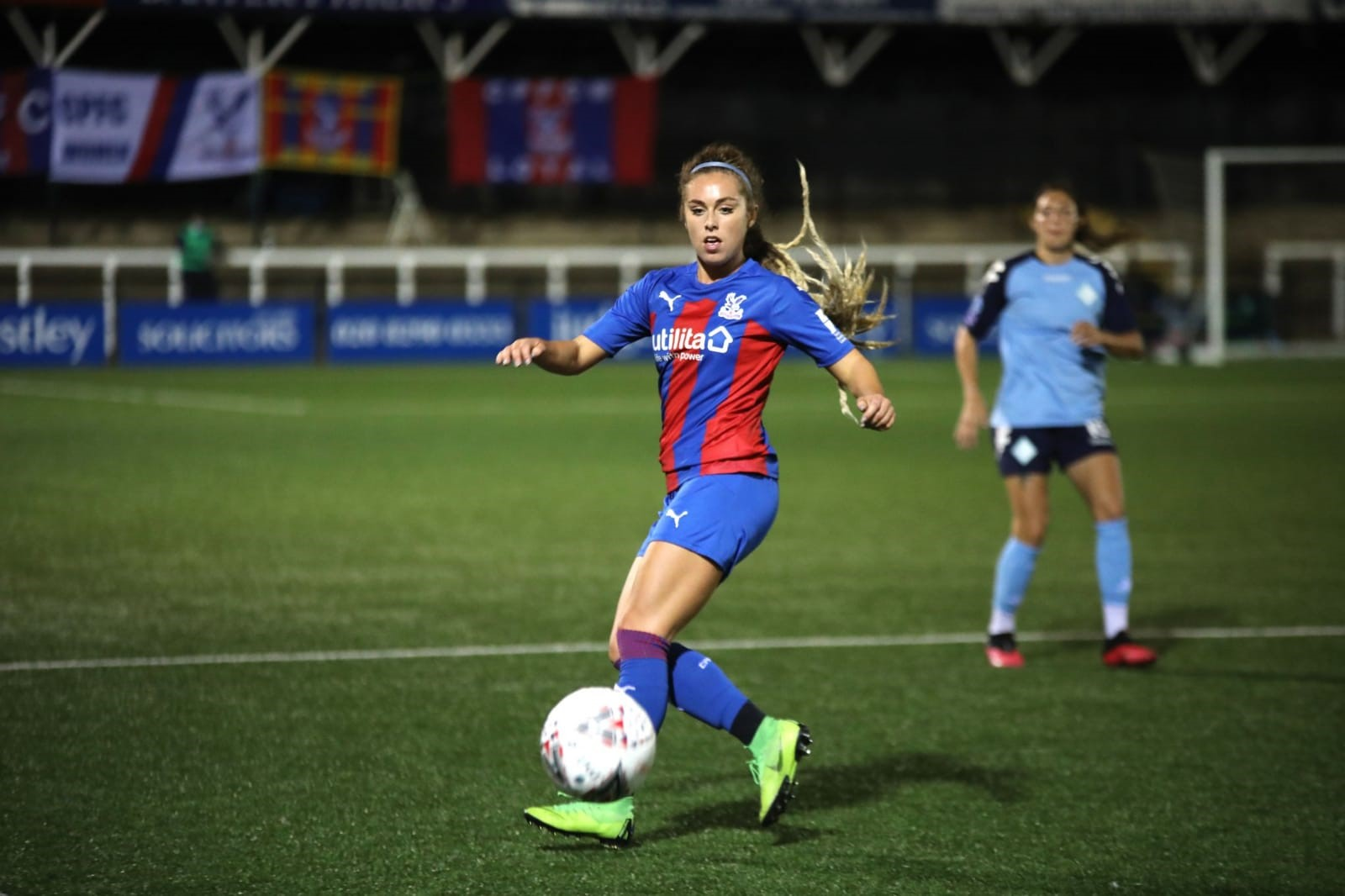

Personal information
- Date of birth: 22 February 1995 (age 31)
- Place of birth: England
- Position: Midfielder

Team information
- Current team: Real Bedford F.C.

Youth career
- 2007-2014: Arsenal

Senior career*
Years	Team	Apps	(Gls)
2014–2015	London Bees		
2015–2018	Millwall Lionesses	14	(2)
2018–2019	Yeovil Town	12	(1)
2020–2021	Crystal Palace	12	(1)
2021–2022	Billericay Town	5	(2)
- * Club domestic league appearances and goals as of 15:46, 16 November 2020 (UTC)

Amber Gaylor (born 22 February 1995) is an association footballer who plays as a midfielder for Real Bedford F.C. in the FA Women's National League Division 1 South East.

Gaylor made twelve appearances in the FA Women's Super League in the 2018–19 season for Yeovil Town, scoring one goal.

In January 2020 she moved from the London Lionesses to join Crystal Palace. She and Siobhan Wilson were both signed by the manager Dean Davenport.
