= Stoke Gifford Stadium =

Football stadium in Filton, England

Coordinates: 51.512651°N 2.556910°W

Stoke Gifford Stadium is an association football stadium based in Filton, in South Gloucestershire, England. Until August 2020 it was the home of FA Women's Super League team Bristol City W.F.C. and the Bristol Aztecs american football team. It is part of the South Gloucestershire and Stroud College and was opened in 2011 under the name of Kip Keino Athletic Stadium as it has an athletics track around it.

The cost of the development was £875,000 with £450,000 coming from Bristol City Council. Bristol City moved into the stadium in 2011 at the same time as the Aztecs and the Kenyan athletics team used it as a training venue for the 2012 Summer Olympics. The stadium has a capacity of 1,500, the main stand seating 300. The nearest railway stations are Bristol Parkway and Filton Abbey Wood.
