= Pedro Martínez Losa =

Spanish football manager, head coach and sporting director

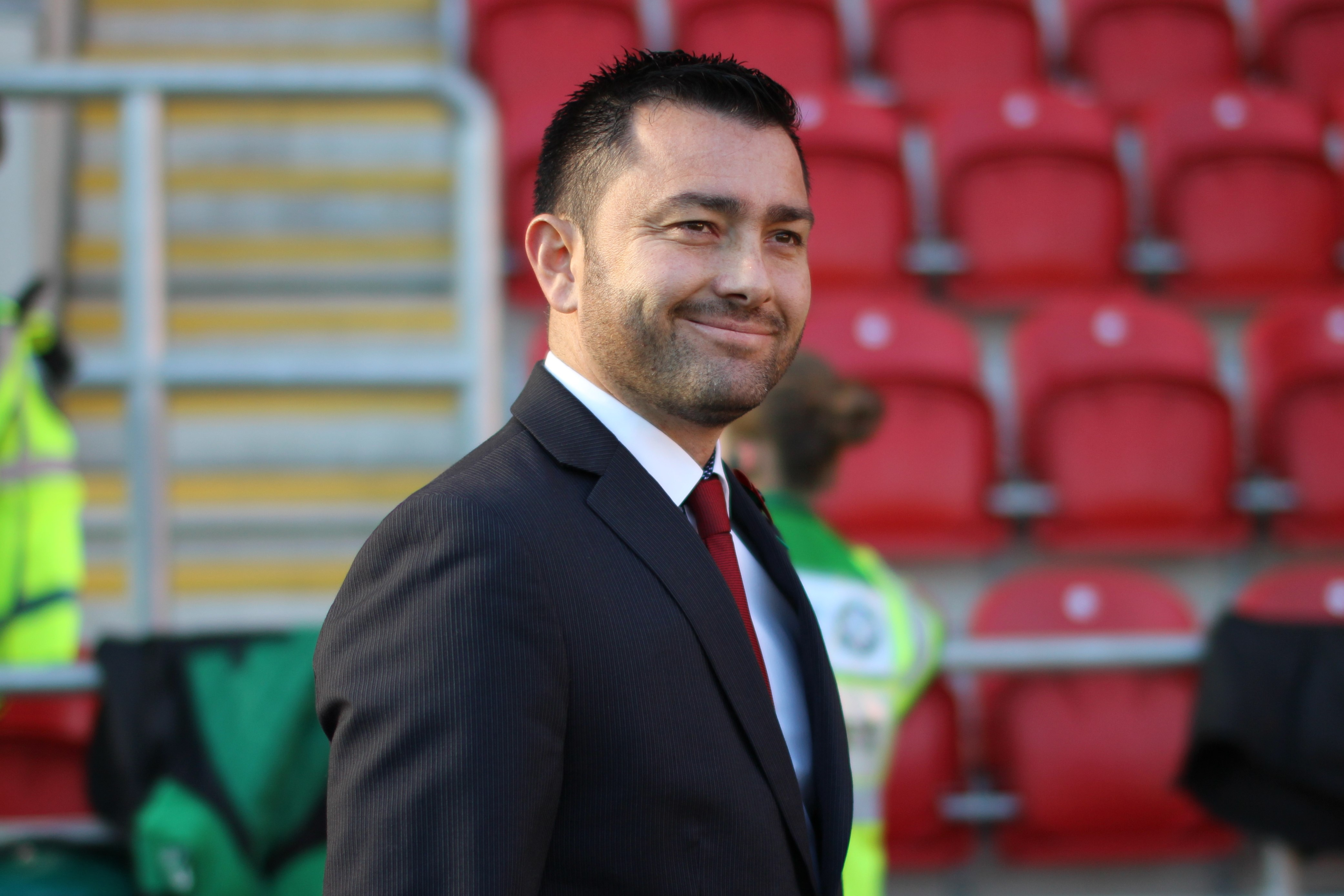

Personal information
- Date of birth: 9 May 1976 (age 50)
- Place of birth: Madrid, Spain

Team information
- Current team: UANL (women) (manager)

Managerial career
- Years: Team
- 2007–2008: Pozuelo Alarcón (women)
- 2008–2012: Rayo Vallecano Femenino
- 2012–2014: Western New York Flash (assistant)
- 2014–2017: Arsenal (women)
- 2019–2021: Bordeaux (women)
- 2021–2024: Scotland (women)
- 2025–: UANL (women)

Pedro Martínez Losa (born 9 May 1976) is a Spanish football coach and sporting director, who is currently the manager of Liga MX Femenil club Tigres. Known primarily for his prominence within women's football, Martínez Losa has won major trophies in his native Spain with Rayo Vallecano Femenino, and in England with Arsenal Women.

== Career ==
Martínez Losa has built up nearly 20 years' coaching experience, proving particularly adept at raising the level of professionalism at the clubs he has worked at. He began his coaching career at Pozuelo Alarcón, with their U-13, U-14 and U-15 boys' teams, and also had a stint coaching U-9, U-10 & U-12 boys' sides at Atlético Madrid.

=== Rayo Vallecano Femenino ===
Martínez Losa then started to coach women's football teams, first with the head coach's position at Pozuelo Alarcón, before moving on to take the top job at Rayo Vallecano Femenino. His tenure with Rayo was very successful, leading the club to their first major trophy in their history with the Copa de la Reina in 2008. Rayo then went on to win the league title for three consecutive seasons (2008–09, 2009–10 and 2010–11) and reached the quarter-finals of the UEFA Women's Champions League in 2011.

=== Western New York Flash ===
In 2012, he moved to the United States to the Western New York Flash as assistant coach to Aaran Lines, while he was also handed the role of Advanced Training Instructor at the Flash Youth Academy. In his first season with the Flash, they were joint winners of the National Women's Soccer League (alongside Portland Thorns and Kansas City), but in the subsequent play-offs they lost the championship final to Portland. In addition to being a part of the Flash set up, Losa spent the 2013 season as assistant coach to Niagara Purple Eagles women's soccer coach Peter Veltri.

=== Arsenal ===
In 2014, Martínez Losa was named as the new manager of Arsenal Women, succeeding Shelley Kerr. With Arsenal, he led the team to the FA WSL Cup and the 2016 FA Women's Cup. He also helped lay the foundations for the team's current success by signing the likes of Dominique Janssen, Sari van Veenendaal, Katie McCabe, Daniëlle van de Donk, Kim Little, Beth Mead and Vivianne Miedema. Losa's time in charge also included bringing through youngsters of the quality of Leah Williamson, Charlie Devlin and Lauren James. Martínez Losa left Arsenal in October 2017, following a mixed start to the season.

=== Millwall Lionesses ===
In July 2018, he was appointed Director of Football for Millwall Lionesses, but left in June 2019, when the club broke away from the men's side and became the London City Lionesses.

=== Bordeaux ===
On 7 June 2019, Martínez Losa was named as the new manager of Division 1 Féminine club Bordeaux, succeeding Jérôme Dauba. In his first season at the club, Bordeaux achieved their all-time best top-division finish of third place, with Martínez Losa being named coach of the season by French women's football website L'Équipière. In the 2020–21 season, Bordeaux repeated that achievement, which brought the club's first ever participation in the UEFA Women's Champions League.

=== Scotland ===
Martínez Losa was appointed head coach of the Scotland women's national team in July 2021. Scotland failed to qualify for the 2023 FIFA Women's World Cup, losing a play-off final against the Republic of Ireland. Martínez Losa signed a new four-year contract with Scotland in September 2023, a decision for which the Scottish Football Association was criticised later that year after Scotland lost 6–0 to England and were relegated from their Nations League group. Although Scotland finished top of their qualifying group for the UEFA Women's Euro 2025 tournament, they failed to reach the finals, losing over two legs in the play-offs against Finland. Following this, Martínez Losa stepped down as head coach.

=== Tigres ===
On 20 December 2024, Martínez Losa was appointed as the new manager of Liga MX Femenil club Tigres. On 23 November 2025 won the tournament Apertura 2025 of the Liga MX Femenil.

== Honours ==
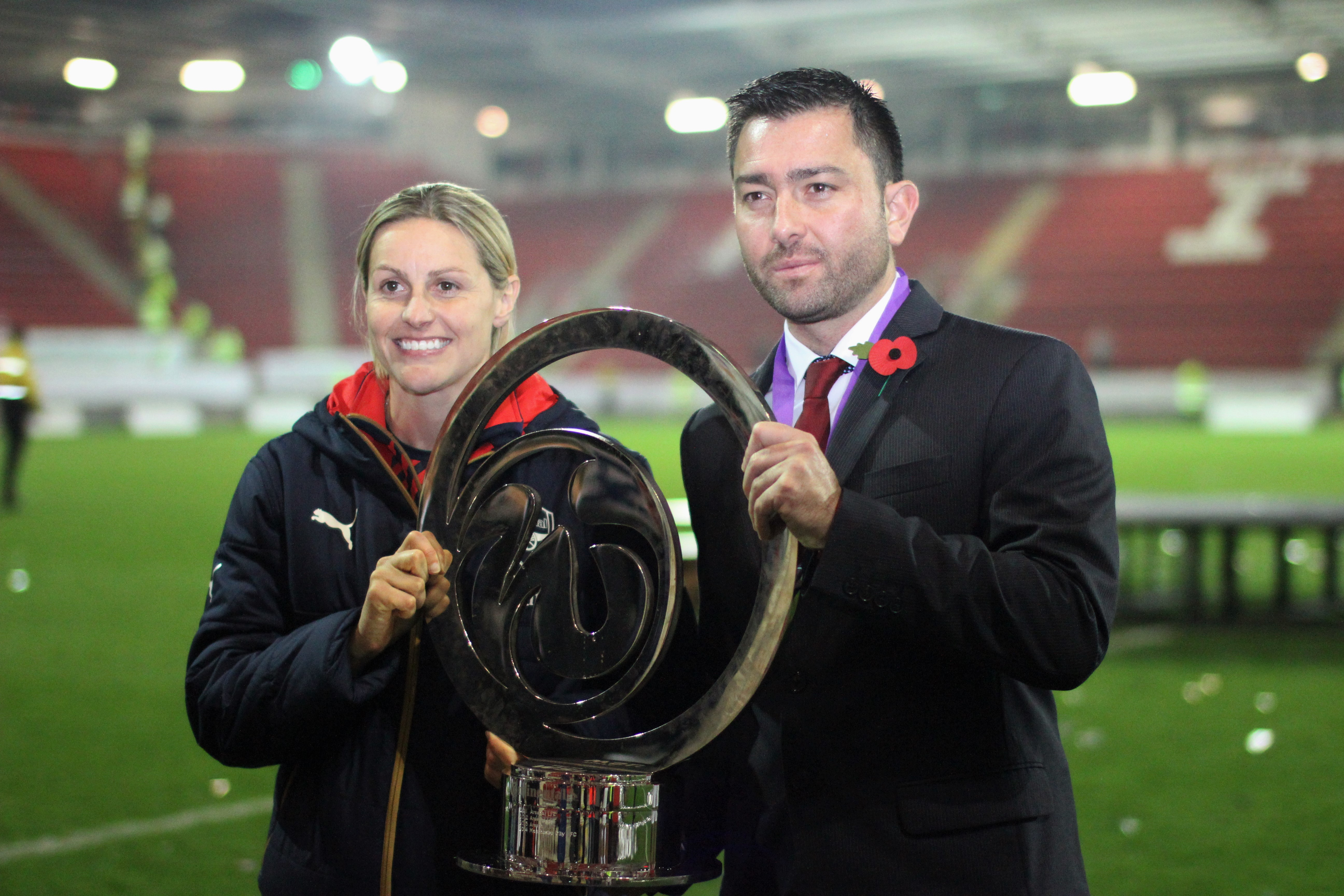
Martínez Losa and Kelly Smith with the FA WSL Cup, 2015

=== Manager ===
Rayo Vallecano Femenino

- Primera División: 2008–09, 2009–10, 2010–11
- Copa de la Reina: 2008

Arsenal Women

- FA Women's Cup: 2016
- FA WSL Cup: 2015

UANL (women) }}

- Liga MX femenil]

Apertura 2025
