= Jade Bailey (footballer) =

British-Jamaican footballer (born 1995)

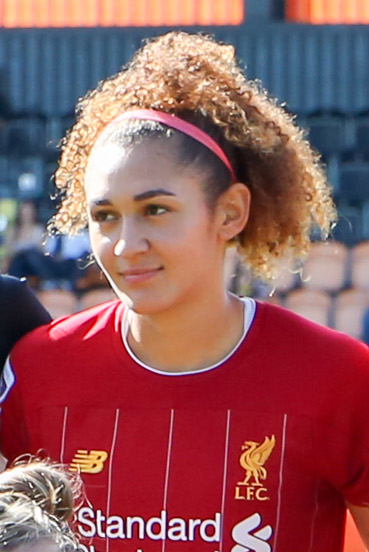
- With Liverpool in 2019

Personal information
- Full name: Jade Helen Bailey
- Date of birth: 11 November 1995 (age 31)
- Place of birth: London, England
- Height: 1.70 m (5 ft 7 in)
- Positions: Defender; midfielder

Team information
- Current team: Querétaro
- Number: 25

Youth career
- Chapel End
- Arsenal

Senior career*
Years	Team	Apps	(Gls)
2013–2015	Arsenal	27	(0)
2015–2019	Chelsea	13	(0)
2019	→ Reading (loan)	6	(0)
2019–2022	Liverpool	39	(1)
2024	London City Lionesses	0	(0)
2024–2025	Sheffield United	14	(0)
2026	Piteå	4	(0)
2026–	Querétaro	1	(0)

International career^{‡}
2010	England U17	2	(0)
- England U20
2021–	Jamaica	10	(0)
Medal record
Representing Jamaica
CONCACAF W Championship
Third place	2022 Mexico
- * Club domestic league appearances and goals as of 15:37, 23 January 2026 (UTC) ‡ National team caps and goals as of 08:30, 3 March 2026 (UTC+1)

Jade Helen Bailey (born 11 November 1995) is a professional footballer who plays as a defender for Querétaro and the Jamaica women's national football team.

She last played for Liverpool FC and previously played for Arsenal, Chelsea and Reading (on loan from Chelsea). She is a former England youth international. She was involved in the final stages of the 2012 Summer Olympics torch relay. Born in England, she represents Jamaica internationally.

== Early life ==
Bailey is the daughter of soccer coach Trevor Bailey, the founder of Interwood Junior Football Club. Bailey started playing football at age 6 for a Sunday league team, becoming the top goalscorer for Chapel End. She eventually became captain and the only female player of Waltham Forest Schools U11. But the team did not allow mixed-gender teams from age 11, so Bailey got a trial with Arsenal, was signed to Arsenal's U12s girls team, started training with Arsenal, and was spotted by England scouts.

Bailey says she admired footballers Ashley Cole and John Terry, then later Arsenal and England captain Faye White.

== Club career ==
She was given a scholarship and a two-year professional contract by Arsenal Ladies football team. Bailey came off the bench during Arsenal's win in the 2013 FA Cup. Bailey started the 2014 FA Cup final and was part of the Arsenal side which won 2–0. In April 2015, Manchester City's England midfielder Jill Scott was shown the red card and banned for three matches for headbutting Bailey during a match.

Bailey transferred to Chelsea in 2016 and made 16 appearances in her first season, as a deep-lying midfielder and sometimes in central defence. She suffered an anterior cruciate ligament injury in April 2017, ruling her out of participation in the following season. In January 2019, Chelsea gave Bailey a one-year contract extension and sent her on loan to Reading to prove her fitness.

In July 2019 Bailey was transferred to Liverpool, who assigned her the number 8 shirt. She was released at the end of the 2021–22 season.

On 4 February 2024, Bailey was announced at London City Lionesses.

On 21 September 2024, Bailey was announced at Sheffield United.

On 16 January 2026, Bailey joined Damallsvenskan side Piteå for the 2026 season.

In July 2026, Bailey signed for Liga Femenil side Querétaro.

== International career ==
Bailey made her debut for England's under-17s on 3 October 2010 against Turkey as a defender although she had been an unplayed substitute in the matches against Italy and Serbia earlier that year. She was chosen by kit manufacturer Umbro in 2010 as one of the next generation of England's footballing stars.

She was included in the England u20 for the 2014 FIFA U-20 Women's World Cup in Canada. In 2016 Bailey was selected by coach Marieanne Spacey for England's 'Next Gen' squad, which replaced the previous Under-23 set up, though still competing in U23-aged matches and competitions.

On 6 May 2021, Bailey was included in the Jamaica women's national football team for the friendlies against Nigeria and the United States. On 25 October 2021, she debuted for Jamaica.

== Olympic Games ==
The Olympic organizers appealed for a talented young footballer to take part in the 2012 Summer Olympics torch relay. Bailey had been trained by the Bailey Elite Football Academy in Wadham Lodge, Walthamstow during her teens and Waltham Forest Council nominated her to the organizers. Her part in the relay was watched by an estimated global audience of one billion as she stood on the prow of the motorboat driven by David Beckham and held the Olympic torch that was ferried to Steve Redgrave during the 2012 Summer Olympics opening ceremony. She was interviewed by the BBC's children's news program Newsround about the event and pointed out that Beckham drove the boat for most of its journey but didn't get to park it.

== Honours ==
- FA Women's Cup
  - Winner (2): 2012–13 and 2013–2014
- FA Women's Championship
  - Winner (1): 2021-22
