= Jemma Rose =

English footballer

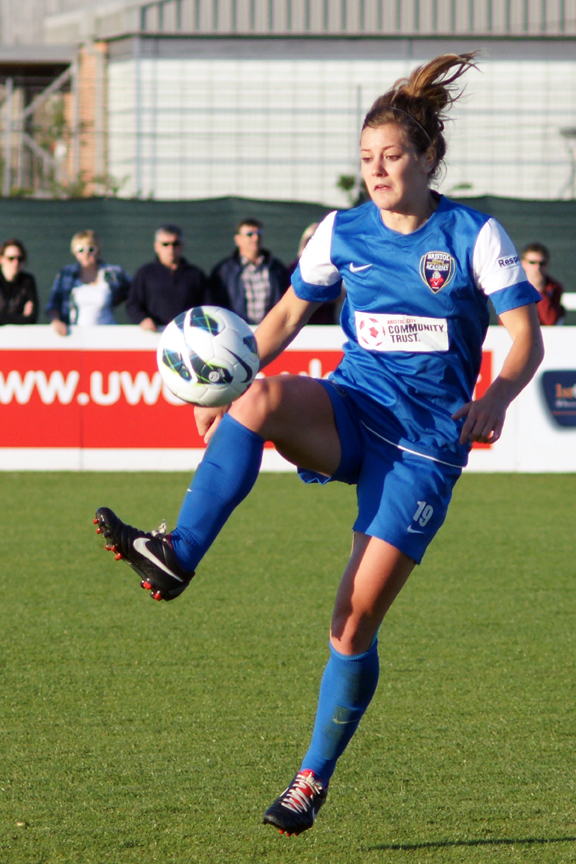

Personal information
- Full name: Jemma Helen Rose
- Date of birth: 19 January 1992 (age 34)
- Place of birth: Plymouth, England
- Height: 1.66 m (5 ft 5 1/2 in)
- Position: Defender

Team information
- Current team: Plymouth Argyle
- Number: 4

Youth career
- Plymouth Argyle

Senior career*
Years	Team	Apps	(Gls)
2007–2008	Plymouth Argyle	16	(1)
2008–2009	Bristol Academy	2	(0)
2009–2010	Birmingham City	18	(0)
2010–2014	Bristol Academy	53	(3)
2015–2018	Arsenal	28	(0)
2021–2024	Plymouth Argyle	50	(11)

International career^{‡}
2008–2009	England U17	3	(0)
2010–2011	England U19	7	(0)
2012–2014	England U23	12	(0)
2015	England	1	(0)
Medal record
Women's football
Representing Great Britain
Summer Universiade
Gold medal – first place	2013 Kazan	Team
- * Club domestic league appearances and goals as of 14:45, 2 June 2024 (UTC) ‡ National team caps and goals as of 29 November 2015

Jemma Helen Rose (born 19 January 1992) is a former English footballer. She has represented England, making her debut at senior level in November 2015. Rose was named the FA Women's Young Player of the Year in 2011.

== Club career ==
Rose progressed through the Centre of Excellence at Plymouth Argyle. On turning 16 in January 2008 she was able to play for the senior Plymouth Argyle Ladies team in the South West Combination Women's Football League.

At the end of that season Rose left to take up a two-year scholarship at the FA Player Development Centre at Loughborough University. During the first year of the course she was attached to Bristol Academy, then played with Birmingham City Ladies in 2009–10.

After finishing her course at Loughborough, Rose decided to leave Birmingham City and enrol on a sports science and coaching degree at UCP Marjon. She rejoined Bristol Academy and commuted from home in Plymouth to play and train with the FA WSL club.

In the 2011 FA WSL season, Rose's performances won the Young Player of the Year at the FA Women's Awards. She also collected the Goal of the Season award for a long range free kick scored in Bristol's 2–1 win at Doncaster Rovers Belles.

Rose played for Bristol in the 2011–12 UEFA Women's Champions League. In the first leg of the tie against Energy Voronezh, played at Ashton Gate, she was sent off for handballing on the goal line. Pamela Conti scored the resultant penalty kick to equalise Jessica Fishlock's opening goal.

On 12 December 2014, Rose signed for Arsenal. In 2016 Rose was party to a pub brawl at Pride in London, sparked by a rival footballer flirting with her then girlfriend.

== International career ==
Rose captained England at Under–17 level. In November 2008 she was part of the England squad which achieved fourth place at the 2008 FIFA U-17 Women's World Cup in New Zealand. Rose appeared in one game, as a late substitute for Lucy Bronze in the third place play-off against Germany.

After progressing through Under–19 level, Rose was called up to an Under–23 training camp in November 2011.

In January 2012 Rose was named in the provisional 150 player long list for the Team GB squad at the 2012 Olympics. Due to good form, Rose was considered by club manager Mark Sampson and teammate Jess Fishlock to be in contention for a place in the final squad.

In July 2013 Rose helped Great Britain to a gold medal in the 2013 Summer Universiade in Kazan, Russia. Rose had been consistently overlooked by England and Great Britain Olympic coach Hope Powell, but when Sampson replaced Powell he named Rose in his first senior squad.

Rose won her first senior cap in November 2015, as a late substitute in England's 1–0 UEFA Women's Euro 2017 qualifying win over Bosnia and Herzegovina at Ashton Gate, Bristol in torrential rain.

Rose was named number 194 when the FA announced their legacy numbers scheme to honour the 50th anniversary of England's inaugural international.
