= Sari van Veenendaal =

Dutch footballer

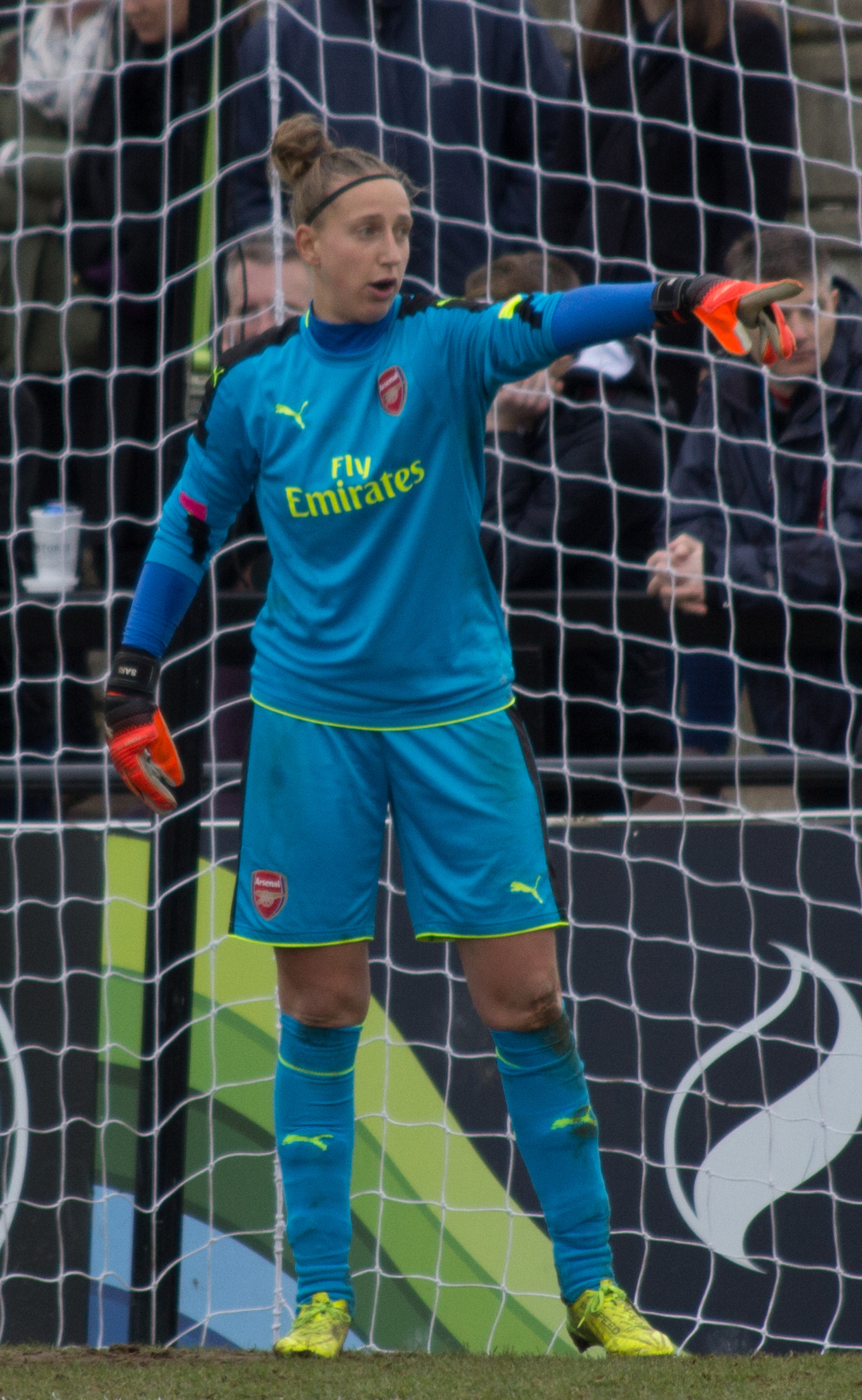
- Van Veenendaal with Arsenal in 2017

Personal information
- Full name: Sari van Veenendaal
- Date of birth: 3 April 1990 (age 36)
- Place of birth: Nieuwegein, Netherlands
- Height: 1.77 m (5 ft 10 in)
- Position: Goalkeeper

Youth career
- VSV Vreeswijk

Senior career*
Years	Team	Apps	(Gls)
2007–2010	Utrecht	2	(0)
2010–2015	Twente	112	(0)
2015–2019	Arsenal	48	(0)
2019–2020	Atlético Madrid	10	(0)
2020–2022	PSV	39	(0)
Total		211	(0)

International career
2011–2022	Netherlands	91	(0)
Medal record
Women's football
Representing the Netherlands
FIFA Women's World Cup
Runner-up	2019 France
UEFA Women's Championship
Winner	2017 Netherlands
- * Club domestic league appearances and goals

Sari van Veenendaal (Dutch pronunciation: [ˈsaːri vɑɱ ˈveːnə(n)ˌdaːl]; born 3 April 1990) is a Dutch former professional footballer. She was part of the Netherlands squad that won UEFA Women's Euro 2017.

== Club career ==
=== The Netherlands ===
Born in Nieuwegein, the Netherlands, Van Veenendaal firstly played as a professional footballer in 2007 for FC Utrecht, as an understudy to Angela Christ. In 2010, she moved to FC Twente. Whilst featuring for the Tukkers, Van Veenendaal won the Eredivisie of the 2010–11 season. She was also successful in picking up the BeNe League titles of 2013, 2014 and 2015 in all.

=== Arsenal ===
Van Veenendaal signed for the English club Arsenal in 2015. In her first season there, Arsenal won the 2015 FA WSL Cup. Next season, Arsenal won the 2016 FA Women's Cup with the club beating Chelsea 1–0 in the final. Another FA WSL cup was conquered in the 2017–18 season, when the club defeated Manchester City Women in the final and Van Veenendaal posted a clean sheet.

=== Atlético Madrid ===
In July 2019, Van Veenendaal left Arsenal upon the expiry of her contract and joined Atlético Madrid.

=== PSV ===
In May 2020, Van Veenendaal joined PSV on a free transfer. In July 2022, Van Veenendaal announced her immediate retirement.

== International career ==
Van Veenendaal won her first cap for the senior national team on 7 March 2011, a 6–0 win over Switzerland at the Cyprus Cup.

She was called up to be part of the national team for the UEFA Women's Euro 2013 and the FIFA Women's World Cup 2015.

Van Veenendaal was part of the national team for the UEFA Women's Euro 2017. The Netherlands won the tournament. Van Veenendaal started in all six matches in the competition, and allowed just three goals, helping them to win each of the Netherlands' matches. She was named to the Best XI of the tournament. After the tournament, the whole team was honoured by the Prime Minister Mark Rutte and Minister of Sport Edith Schippers and made Knights of the Order of Orange-Nassau.

== Honours ==
FC Utrecht

- KNVB Women's Cup: 2009–10

FC Twente

- BeNe League: 2012–13, 2013–14
- Eredivisie: 2010–11
- KNVB Women's Cup: 2014–15

Arsenal

- FA Women's Super League: 2018–19
- FA Women's Cup: 2015–16
- FA WSL Cup: 2015, 2017–18

Netherlands

- UEFA European Women's Championship: 2017
- Algarve Cup: 2018
- FIFA Women's World Cup: runner-up 2019
- Tournoi de France: runner-up 2020

Individual

- UEFA European Women's Championship Team of the Tournament: 2017
- FIFA Women's World Cup Golden Glove: 2019
- The Best FIFA Women's Goalkeeper: 2019
- IFFHS World's Best Woman Goalkeeper: 2019
- IFFHS Women's World Team: 2019

Orders

- Knight of the Order of Orange-Nassau: 2017
