= 2017–18 Reading F.C. Women season =

Reading FC Women
2017–18 season
- Manager: Kelly Chambers
- Stadium: Adams Park, High Wycombe
- FA WSL 1: 4th
- FA Cup: Fourth round vs Birmingham City
- FA WSL Cup: Semifinal vs Arsenal
- Top goalscorer: League: Remi Allen (9); All: Brooke Chaplen (12)
- Highest home attendance: 1,379 vs Liverpool (12 May 2018)
- Lowest home attendance: 172 vs Bristol City (21 February 2018)
- Average home league attendance: 647 (12 May 2018)

== Season events ==
On 16 August, Reading signed Fara Williams from Arsenal Women to a two-year contract.

On 3 January, Reading signed Natasha Harding from Liverpool to a long-term contract.

== Squad ==
As of match played 20 May 2018

No.	Name	Nationality	Position	Date of birth (Age (Note: Age as of the end of the season))	Signed from	Signed in	Contract ends	Apps.	Goals
Goalkeepers
1	Mary Earps	(England)	GK	7 March 1993 (aged 25)	Bristol Academy	2016	2018		
21	Grace Moloney	(Republic of Ireland)	GK	1 March 1993 (aged 25)	Academy	2009		120	0
	Rose Kite	(England)	GK	29 January 2001 (aged 17)	Academy	2017			
Defenders
2	Becky Jane	(England)	DF	6 August 1996 (aged 21)	Chelsea	2011	2019		
3	Harriet Scott	(Republic of Ireland)	DF	10 February 1993 (aged 25)	Academy	2009	2018		
5	Molly Bartrip	(England)	DF	1 June 1996 (aged 21)	Academy	2014			
6	Kirsty Pearce (captain)	(England)	DF	19 April 1987 (aged 31)	Portsmouth	2014	2018		
15	Anna Green	(New Zealand)	DF	20 August 1990 (aged 27)	Mallbackens	2017			
22	Jo Potter	(England)	DF	13 November 1984 (aged 33)	Notts County Ladies	2017			
37	Evie Gane	(Wales)	DF	10 December 1999 (aged 18)	Academy	2017			
Midfielders
4	Fara Williams	(England)	MF	25 January 1984 (aged 35)	Arsenal	2017	2019		
7	Rachel Furness	(Northern Ireland)	MF	19 June 1988 (aged 29)	Sunderland	2017			
8	Remi Allen	(England)	MF	15 October 1990 (aged 27)	Birmingham City	2016			
18	Jade Moore	(England)	MF	22 October 1990 (aged 27)	Notts County Ladies	2017			
20	Natasha Harding	(Wales)	MF	2 March 1989 (aged 30)	Liverpool	2018		13	0
23	Rachel Rowe	(Wales)	MF	13 September 1992 (aged 25)	Swansea City	2015		71	7
25	Tamsin de Bunsen	(England)	MF	30 July 1999 (aged 18)	Academy	2017			
34	Sophie O'Rourke	(England)	MF	3 June 1999 (aged 18)	Academy	2017		0	0
36	Emma Harries	(England)	MF	29 March 2002 (aged 16)	Academy	2017			
	Niamh Reynolds	(Republic of Ireland)	MF	31 October 2001 (aged 16)	Academy	2017		0	0
Forwards
9	Kirsty Linnett	(England)	FW	24 September 1993 (aged 24)	Notts County	2017			
10	Lauren Bruton	(England)	FW	22 November 1992 (aged 25)	Arsenal	2013	2018		
19	Brooke Chaplen	(England)	FW	16 April 1989 (aged 29)	Sunderland	2017			
20	Melissa Fletcher	(Wales)	FW	28 January 1992 (aged 26)	Academy	2008	2018		
Out on loan
17	Charlie Estcourt	(Wales)	MF	27 May 1998 (aged 19)	Chelsea	2015			
Left during the season
14	Mandy van den Berg	(Netherlands)	DF	26 August 1990 (aged 27)	Liverpool	2017			

== Transfers ==
=== In ===
Date	Position	Nationality	Name	From	Fee	Ref.
16 August 2017	MF	(England)	Fara Williams	Arsenal	Undisclosed	
3 January 2018	MF	(Wales)	Natasha Harding	Liverpool	Undisclosed	

=== Out ===
Date	Position	Nationality	Name	To	Fee	Ref.
8 January 2018	DF	(Netherlands)	Mandy van den Berg	Valencia	Undisclosed	

=== Released ===
Date	Position	Nationality	Name	Joined	Date	Ref.
30 June 2018	DF	(Republic of Ireland)	Harriet Scott	Birmingham City	15 August 2018	
30 June 2018	DF	(New Zealand)	Anna Green	Capital Football		
30 June 2018	MF	(England)	Sophie O'Rourke	Grindavík		
30 June 2018	FW	(England)	Kirsty Linnett	Liverpool	11 August 2018	

== Pre-season ==
	v
GMT (UTC)

== Competitions ==
=== Women's Super League ===
==== Results summary ====
Overall								Home						Away					
Pld	W	D	L	GF	GA	GD	Pts	W	D	L	GF	GA	GD	W	D	L	GF	GA	GD
18	9	5	4	40	18	+22	32	4	3	2	19	10	+9	5	2	2	21	8	+13

Last updated: 20 May 2018.
Source: See Results

==== Results by matchday ====
Matchday	1	2	3	4	5	6	7	8	9	10	11	12	13	14	15	16	17	18
Ground	H	A	H	A	H	H	H	A	H	A	H	A	A	A	H	A	H	A
Result	L	W	D	W	D	L	D	L	W	D	W	W	W	L	W	W	W	D

Updated to match(es) played on 20 May 2018. Source: See Results
A = Away; H = Home; W = Win; D = Draw; L = Loss

==== Results ====
24 September 2017 1	Reading	0–1	Sunderland	High Wycombe
12:30 BST (UTC+1)	Bartrip (yellow card) 44'; Pearce (yellow card) 90'	Report	Koren 6'; Williams (yellow card) 76'	Stadium: Adams Park; Attendance: 502; Referee: Stacey Pearson

29 September 2017 2	Liverpool	0–3	Reading	Widnes
19:00 BST (UTC+1)		Report	Williams 19'; Allen 33'; Chaplen 74'	Stadium: DCBL Stadium; Attendance: 481; Referee: Joe Hull

8 October 2017 3	Reading	2–2	Birmingham City	High Wycombe
14:00 BST (UTC+1)	Chaplen 21'; Moore 30'; Bartrip (yellow card) 42'; Allen (yellow card) 51'	Report	Mannion (yellow card) 36' (goal) 45+2' (pen.); Carter (yellow card) 90+1'; Pearce 90+3' (o.g.)	Stadium: Adams Park; Attendance: 655; Referee: Joshua Smith

28 October 2017 4	Bristol City	0–5	Reading	Filton
17:30 GMT (UTC)	Matthews (yellow card) 36'; Brown (yellow card) 43'	Report	Williams 3'; Rowe 17', 70', 80'; Allen 20'; Chaplen (penalty missed) 32'; Moore (yellow card) 36'	Stadium: Stoke Gifford Stadium; Attendance: 573; Referee: Scott Jackson

12 November 2017 5	Reading	2–2	Chelsea	High Wycombe
12:30 GMT (UTC)	Allen 35'; Chaplen (yellow card) 44'; Pearce (yellow card) 80'; Eriksson 90+2' (o.g.)	Report	Thorisdottir (yellow card) 33'; Carney 56'; Aluko 75'; Eriksson (yellow card) 90+2'	Stadium: Adams Park; Attendance: 1,012; Referee: Rebecca Welch

7 January 2018 6	Reading	2–5	Manchester City	High Wycombe
16:00 GMT (UTC)	Allen 34'; Chaplen 41'; Pearce (yellow card) 81'	Report	Nadim 6'; Emslie 32'; Christiansen 43'; Scott 56', 58'	Stadium: Adams Park; Attendance: 951; Referee: Abby Marriott

28 January 2018 7	Reading	0–0	Arsenal	High Wycombe
14:00 GMT (UTC)	Rowe (yellow card) 25'; Furness (yellow card) 84'	Report	Miedema (yellow card) 62'; Evans (yellow card) 73'; Nobbs (yellow card) 74'	Stadium: Adams Park; Attendance: 690; Referee: Helen Byrne

11 February 2018 8	Everton	2–1	Reading	Widnes
14:00 GMT (UTC)	Sweetman-Kirk 6'; Kelly 23'; Green (yellow card) 90+2'	Report	Furness 38' (yellow card) 76'; Pearce (yellow card) 45+2'; Williams (yellow card) 68'	Stadium: DCBL Stadium; Attendance: 274; Referee: Lindsey Robinson

21 February 2018 9	Reading	4–0	Bristol City	High Wycombe
19:45 GMT (UTC)	Pearce 30'; Williams 52', 70'; Chaplen 55'	Report	Arthur (yellow card) 45+2'	Stadium: Adams Park; Attendance: 172; Referee: Will Finnie

25 March 2018 10	Chelsea	2–2	Reading	Kingston upon Thames
14:00 GMT (UTC)	Chapman (yellow card) 17'; Eriksson (yellow card) 17'; Andersson 51'; Kirby 77'	Report	Chaplen 25' (pen.); Harding (yellow card) 45'; Williams 47'; Moore (yellow card) 82'	Stadium: Kingsmeadow; Attendance: 1,652; Referee: Helen Byrne

28 March 2018 11	Reading	3–0	Yeovil Town	High Wycombe
19:45 BST (UTC+1)	Chaplen (penalty missed) 35'; Allen 41'; Bruton 53'; Linnett 78'	Report	Cousins (yellow card) 49'	Stadium: Adams Park; Attendance: 197; Referee: Dean Hulme

1 April 2018 12	Manchester City	0–2	Reading	Manchester
14:00 BST (UTC+1)		Report	Allen 35'; Pearce 61'; Moore (yellow card) 74'; Potter (red card) 81'	Stadium: Academy Stadium; Attendance: 1,274; Referee: Helen Conley

13 April 2018 13	Yeovil Town	0–4	Reading	Yeovil
19:45 BST (UTC+1)	J.Jones (yellow card) 64'; T-j.Gauvain (yellow card) 83'; Evans (yellow card) 90+3'	Report	Allen 10', 13'; Furness (yellow card) 53' (goal) 58'; Harding (yellow card) 71'; Rowe 85'	Stadium: Huish Park; Attendance: 223; Referee: Phillip Eddie

18 April 2018 14	Arsenal	3–1	Reading	Borehamwood
19:30 BST (UTC+1)	Little 9'; Janssen 27' van de Donk 64'; Williamson (yellow card) 83'	Report	Williams 50'; Harding (yellow card) 53'; Furness (yellow card) 74'; Pearce (yellow card) 78'	Stadium: Meadow Park; Referee: Chris O'Donnell

22 April 2018 15	Reading	3–0	Everton	High Wycombe
12:30 BST (UTC+1)	Moore (yellow card) 27'; Allen 47'; Bruton 73'; Pearce 85'	Report	Turner (yellow card) 31'; James (yellow card) 45+2'; Munsterman (yellow card) 80'	Stadium: Adams Park; Attendance: 263; Referee: Rebecca Welch

29 April 2018 16	Sunderland	0–2	Reading	Hetton-le-Hole
12:00 BST (UTC+1)		Report	Williams 39' (yellow card) 90+6'; Furness 41'; Rowe (yellow card) 60'; Earps (red card) 75'; Bruton (yellow card) 86'	Stadium: Eppleton Colliery Welfare Ground; Referee: Adam Herczeg

12 May 2018 17	Reading	3–0	Liverpool	High Wycombe
14:00 BST (UTC+1)	Chaplen 5', 73' (yellow card) 83'; Furness (yellow card) 67'; Bruton 81'	Report		Stadium: Adams Park; Attendance: 1,379; Referee: Lindsey Robinson

20 May 2018 18	Birmingham City	1–1	Reading	Solihull
12:30 BST (UTC+1)	White 29'; Ladd (yellow card) 45+1'; Carter (yellow card) 81'	Report	Chaplen 4'; Allen (yellow card) 71'	Stadium: Damson Park; Attendance: 1,120; Referee: Declan Bourne

==== League table ====
Pos	Team	Pld	W	D	L	GF	GA	GD	Pts	Qualification
1	Chelsea (C, Q)	18	13	5	0	44	13	+31	44	Qualification for the Champions League
2	Manchester City (Q)	18	12	2	4	51	17	+34	38	Qualification for the Champions League
3	Arsenal	18	11	4	3	38	18	+20	37	
4	Reading	18	9	5	4	40	18	+22	32	
5	Birmingham City	18	9	3	6	30	18	+12	30	
6	Liverpool	18	9	1	8	30	27	+3	28	
7	Sunderland (R)	18	5	1	12	15	40	−25	16	Did not apply for a licence, Relegated to the FA Women's National League
8	Bristol City	18	5	1	12	13	47	−34	16	
9	Everton	18	4	2	12	19	30	−11	14	
10	Yeovil Town	18	0	2	16	2	54	−52	2	

Source: FA WSL
Rules for classification: 1) Points; 2) Goal difference; 3) Number of goals scored
(C) Champions; (Q) Qualified for the phase indicated; (R) Relegated

=== FA Cup ===
4 February 2018 Fourth Round	Reading	0–1	Birmingham City	High Wycombe
14:00 GMT (UTC)		Report	Ewers 34'	Stadium: Adams Park

=== FA WSL Cup ===
==== Group stage ====
Pos	Team	Pld	W	WPEN	LPEN	L	GF	GA	GD	Pts	Qualification
1	Reading	4	4	0	0	0	15	1	+14	12	Advance to Knock-out stage
2	Arsenal	4	3	0	0	1	19	4	+15	9	Advance to Knock-out stage
3	Watford	4	1	0	1	2	2	11	−9	4	
4	Millwall Lionesses	4	1	0	0	3	6	14	−8	3	
5	London Bees	4	0	1	0	3	4	16	−12	2	

Source: FA WSL
Rules for classification: 1) Points; 2) Goal difference; 3) Number of goals scored

1 November 2017 1	Reading	4–0	Watford	High Wycombe
19:45 GMT (UTC)	Williams 5'; Bartrip 45'; Linnett 69'; Green 90+1'	Report		Stadium: Adams Park

5 November 2017 2	Arsenal	1–2	Reading	Borehamwood
14:00 GMT (UTC)	Quinn (yellow card) 49'; Mead 62'	Report	Bruton (yellow card) 29'; Allen (yellow card) 33'; Williams 56', 63'	Stadium: Meadow Park

15 November 2017 3	Reading	4–0	London Bees	Reading
19:30 GMT (UTC)	Furness (yellow card) 50' (goal) 90'; Pearce 57'; Chaplen 60'; Rowe 75'	Report		Stadium: Madejski Stadium

3 December 2017 4	Millwall Lionesses	0–5	Reading	Rotherhithe
14:00 GMT (UTC)		Report	Chaplen 38', 85'; Furness 52', 65'; Bruton 60'	Stadium: St Paul's Sports Ground

==== Knockout stage ====
16 December 2017 Quarterfinal	Everton	1–1 (a.e.t.) (3–4 p)	Reading	Widnes
18:00 GMT (UTC)	Kelly (yellow card) 97' (goal) 112'	Report	Bruton (yellow card) 26'; Williams (yellow card) 56'; Linnett 94'	Stadium: Select Security Stadium; Attendance: 155; Referee: Benjamin Speedie

14 January 2018 Semifinal	Reading	2–3	Arsenal	High Wycombe
14:00 GMT (UTC)	Chaplen 7'; Bruton 70'; Moloney (yellow card) 79'	Report	Mead 5'; Rose (yellow card) 55'; Miedema 80'; Nobbs 83'	Stadium: Adams Park; Attendance: 749; Referee: Ryan Atkin

== Squad statistics ==
As of match played 20 May 2018

=== Appearances ===
No.	Pos	Nat	Player	Total		WSL		FA Cup		FA WSL Cup	
No.	Pos	Nat	Player	Apps	Goals	Apps	Goals	Apps	Goals	Apps	Goals
1	GK	(England) ENG	Mary Earps	15	0	15	0	0	0	0	0
2	DF	(England) ENG	Becky Jane	11	0	2+4	0	0	0	4+1	0
3	DF	(Republic of Ireland) IRL	Harriet Scott	12	0	5+4	0	0	0	3	0
4	MF	(England) ENG	Fara Williams	24	10	18	7	0	0	6	3
5	DF	(England) ENG	Molly Bartrip	10	1	6	0	0	0	4	1
6	DF	(England) ENG	Kirsty Pearce	23	4	18	3	0	0	5	1
7	MF	(Northern Ireland) NIR	Rachel Furness	23	6	13+4	3	0	0	6	3
8	MF	(England) ENG	Remi Allen	24	9	18	9	0	0	6	0
9	FW	(England) ENG	Kirsty Linnett	19	3	3+10	1	0	0	2+4	2
10	FW	(England) ENG	Lauren Bruton	24	5	16+2	3	0	0	5+1	2
11	FW	(Wales) WAL	Melissa Fletcher	3	0	0+2	0	0	0	0+1	0
15	DF	(New Zealand) NZL	Anna Green	10	1	3+2	0	0	0	2+3	1
18	MF	(England) ENG	Jade Moore	14	1	13+1	1	0	0	0	0
19	FW	(England) ENG	Brooke Chaplen	24	12	18	8	0	0	5+1	4
20	MF	(Wales) WAL	Natasha Harding	13	0	11+2	0	0	0	0	0
21	GK	(Republic of Ireland) IRL	Grace Moloney	10	0	3+1	0	0	0	6	0
22	DF	(England) ENG	Jo Potter	23	0	17	0	0	0	6	0
23	MF	(Wales) WAL	Rachel Rowe	24	5	18	4	0	0	4+2	1
25	MF	(England) ENG	Tamsin de Bunsen	1	0	0	0	0	0	0+1	0
37	DF	(Wales) WAL	Evie Gane	1	0	0+1	0	0	0	0	0
Players away from the club on loan:
Players who appeared for Reading but left during the season:
14	DF	(Netherlands) NED	Mandy van den Berg	6	0	1+1	0	0	0	2+2	0

=== Goal scorers ===
Place	Position	Nation	Number	Name	WSL	FA Cup	FA WSL Cup	Total
1	FW	(England)	19	Brooke Chaplen	8	0	4	12
2	MF	(England)	4	Fara Williams	7	0	3	10
3	MF	(England)	8	Remi Allen	9	0	0	9
4	MF	(Northern Ireland)	7	Rachel Furness	3	0	3	6
5	MF	(Wales)	23	Rachel Rowe	4	0	1	5
5	FW	(England)	10	Lauren Bruton	3	0	2	5
7	DF	(England)	6	Kirsty Pearce	3	0	1	4
8	FW	(England)	9	Kirsty Linnett	1	0	2	3
9	MF	(England)	18	Jade Moore	1	0	0	1
9	DF	(England)	5	Molly Bartrip	0	0	1	1
9	DF	(New Zealand)	15	Anna Green	0	0	1	1
9				Own goal	1	0	0	1
Total					40	0	18	58

=== Clean sheets ===
Place	Position	Nation	Number	Name	WSL	FA Cup	FA WSL Cup	Total
1	GK	(England)	1	Mary Earps	8	0	0	8
2	GK	(Republic of Ireland)	21	Grace Moloney	3	0	3	6
Total					10	0	3	13

Earps & Moloney both played in Reading's 2-0 victory over Sunderland on 29 April 2018

=== Disciplinary record ===
Number	Nation	Position	Name	WSL		FA Cup		FA WSL Cup		Total	
Number	Nation	Position	Name	Booked	Sent off (straight red)	Booked	Sent off (straight red)	Booked	Sent off (straight red)	Booked	Sent off (straight red)
1	(England)	GK	Mary Earps	0	1	0	0	0	0	0	1
4	(England)	MF	Fara Williams	2	0	0	0	1	0	3	0
5	(England)	DF	Molly Bartrip	2	0	0	0	0	0	2	0
6	(England)	DF	Kirsty Pearce	5	0	0	0	0	0	5	0
7	(Northern Ireland)	MF	Rachel Furness	5	0	0	0	1	0	6	0
8	(England)	MF	Remi Allen	2	0	0	0	1	0	3	0
10	(England)	FW	Lauren Bruton	1	0	0	0	2	0	3	0
18	(England)	MF	Jade Moore	4	0	0	0	0	0	4	0
19	(England)	FW	Brooke Chaplen	2	0	0	0	0	0	2	0
20	(Wales)	MF	Natasha Harding	3	0	0	0	0	0	3	0
21	(Republic of Ireland)	GK	Grace Moloney	0	0	0	0	1	0	1	0
22	(England)	DF	Jo Potter	0	1	0	0	0	0	0	1
23	(Wales)	MF	Rachel Rowe	2	0	0	0	0	0	2	0
Players away on loan:
Players who left Reading during the season:
Total				28	2	0	0	6	0	34	2
