= 2017 Reading F.C. Women season =

Reading FC Women
2017 season
- Manager: Kelly Chambers
- Stadium: Adams Park, High Wycombe
- FA WSL 1: 6th
- FA Cup: Fifth round vs Manchester City
- Top goalscorer: League: Melissa Fletcher (3); All: Melissa Fletcher (3)
- Highest home attendance: 797 vs Chelsea (3 May 2017)
- Lowest home attendance: 536 vs Birmingham City (28 May 2017)
- Average home league attendance: 637 (28 May 2017)

The 2017 season was Reading FC Women's second season in the FA WSL 1, after winning promotion from the FA WSL 2 in 2015.

Following a reorganisation of top-level women's football in England, the 2017 season will only cover half of a traditional season's length, while the FA WSL shifts its calendar to match the traditional autumn-to-spring axis of football in Europe. For the same reason, there is no Champions League qualification nor relegation to be competed for.

== Season events ==
On 14 November 2016, Reading signed Mandy van den Berg from Liverpool.

On 9 January, Mary Earps signed an 18-month contract extension with Reading, keeping her at the club until June 2018.

On 12 January 2017, Reading signed Rachel Furness from Sunderland, with Brooke Chaplen making the same move at the end of January.

Lauren Bruton extended her contract with Reading on 19 January, until the summer of 2018.

On 23 January, Melissa Fletcher signed her first professional contract with the club, until June 2018, with Charlie Estcourt signing a similar deal on 25 January, and Becky Jane signed a new contract with Reading until June 2019 on 26 January.

On 24 January, New Zealand international defender Anna Green from Swedish club Mallbackens IF.

On 6 February, Reading signed a new contract with Kirsty McGee, until June 2018, with Harriet Scott also signing a new 18-month contract with Reading on 9 February.

On 8 February, Emma Follis was sold to Birmingham City for an undisclosed fee.

On 8 April, Anissa Lahmari joined Reading on a two-month loan deal from Paris Saint-Germain.

On 1 May, Reading signed Jo Potter, Jade Moore and Kirsty Linnett from recently folded Notts County.

== Squad ==
As of match played 3 June 2017

No.	Name	Nationality	Position	Date of birth (Age (Note: Age as of the end of the season))	Signed from	Signed in	Contract ends	Apps.	Goals
Goalkeepers
1	Mary Earps	(England)	GK	7 March 1993 (aged 24)	Bristol Academy	2016	2018		
21	Grace Moloney	(Republic of Ireland)	GK	1 March 1993 (aged 24)	Academy	2009		110	0
Defenders
2	Becky Jane	(England)	DF	6 August 1996 (aged 20)	Chelsea	2011	2019		
3	Harriet Scott	(Republic of Ireland)	DF	10 February 1993 (aged 24)	Academy	2009	2018		
5	Molly Bartrip	(England)	DF	1 June 1996 (aged 21)	Academy	2014			
6	Kirsty McGee	(England)	DF	19 April 1987 (aged 30)	Portsmouth	2014	2018		
14	Mandy van den Berg	(Netherlands)	DF	26 August 1990 (aged 26)	Liverpool	2017		5	1
15	Anna Green	(New Zealand)	DF	20 August 1990 (aged 26)	Mallbackens	2017		7	0
22	Jo Potter	(England)	DF	13 November 1984 (aged 32)	Notts County Ladies	2017		4	0
Midfielders
4	Kayleigh Hines	(England)	MF	27 February 1991 (aged 26)	Oxford United	2016			
7	Rachel Furness	(Northern Ireland)	MF	19 June 1988 (aged 28)	Sunderland	2017		8	1
8	Remi Allen	(England)	MF	15 October 1990 (aged 26)	Birmingham City	2016		18	0
10	Anissa Lahmari	(France)	MF	17 February 1997 (aged 20)	loan from Paris Saint-Germain	2017	2017	6	0
17	Charlie Estcourt	(Wales)	MF	27 May 1998 (aged 19)	Chelsea	2015			
18	Jade Moore	(England)	MF	22 October 1990 (aged 26)	Notts County Ladies	2017		6	1
23	Rachel Rowe	(Wales)	MF	13 September 1992 (aged 24)	Swansea City	2015		46	2
25	Tamsin de Bunsen	(England)	MF	30 July 1999 (aged 17)	Academy	2017		0	0
34	Sophie O'Rourke	(England)	MF	3 June 1999 (aged 18)	Academy	2017		0	0
Forwards
9	Lauren Bruton	(England)	FW	22 November 1992 (aged 24)	Arsenal	2013	2018		
16	Kirsty Linnett	(England)	FW	24 September 1993 (aged 23)	Notts County	2017		6	0
19	Brooke Chaplen	(England)	FW	16 April 1989 (aged 28)	Sunderland	2017		4	1
20	Melissa Fletcher	(Wales)	FW	28 January 1992 (aged 25)	Academy	2008	2018		
Out on loan
Left during the season

== Transfers ==
=== In ===
Date	Position	Nationality	Name	From	Fee	Ref.
14 November 2016	DF	(Netherlands)	Mandy van den Berg	Liverpool	Undisclosed	
12 January 2017	MF	(Northern Ireland)	Rachel Furness	Sunderland	Undisclosed	
24 January 2017	DF	(New Zealand)	Anna Green	Mallbackens	Undisclosed	
31 January 2017	FW	(England)	Brooke Chaplen	Sunderland	Undisclosed	
1 May 2017	DF	(England)	Jo Potter	Notts County	Undisclosed	
1 May 2017	MF	(England)	Jade Moore	Notts County	Undisclosed	
1 May 2017	FW	(England)	Kirsty Linnett	Notts County	Undisclosed	

=== Loans in ===
Start date	Position	Nationality	Name	From	End date	Ref.
8 April 2017	MF	(France)	Anissa Lahmari	Paris Saint-Germain	End of season	

=== Out ===
Date	Position	Nationality	Name	To	Fee	Ref.
8 February 2017	MF	(England)	Emma Follis	Birmingham City	Undisclosed	

=== Released ===
Date	Position	Nationality	Name	Joined	Date	Ref.
30 June 2017	MF	(England)	Kayleigh Hines	Oxford United	1 August 2017	

== Pre-season ==
29 March 2017	Real Betis (Spain)	2–2	(England) Reading	Seville, Spain
GMT (UTC)	Goal	Report	Bruton; Furness	Stadium: Felipe del Valle Municipal Stadium

== Competitions ==
=== Women's Super League ===
==== Results summary ====
Overall								Home						Away					
Pld	W	D	L	GF	GA	GD	Pts	W	D	L	GF	GA	GD	W	D	L	GF	GA	GD
8	2	2	4	10	15	−5	8	0	1	2	3	8	−5	2	1	2	7	7	0

Last updated: 3 June 2017.
Source: See Results

==== Results by matchday ====
Matchday	1	2	3	4	5	6	7	8
Ground	A	A	H	H	A	H	A	A
Result	W	L	L	L	W	D	L	D

Updated to match(es) played on 3 June 2017. Source: See Results
A = Away; H = Home; W = Win; D = Draw; L = Loss

==== Results ====
22 April 2017 1	Bristol City	1–3	Reading	Bristol
18:00 BST (UTC+1)	Hemp 73'	Report	Furness 49'; Rowe 59'; Fletcher 61'	Stadium: Ashton Gate; Attendance: 1,127; Referee: Robert Massey-Ellis

28 April 2017 2	Liverpool	4–2	Reading	Widnes
19:00 BST (UTC+1)	Harding 2', 25'; Weir 34'; Coombs 50'	Report	Chaplen 4'; Fletcher 8'; Furness (yellow card) 38'	Stadium: Halton Stadium; Attendance: 466; Referee: Matt Donohue

3 May 2017 3	Reading	0–4	Chelsea	High Wycombe
19:35 BST (UTC+1)	Allen (yellow card) 19'; Scott (yellow card) 24'; Moore (yellow card) 90+2'; Furness (yellow card) 90+3'	Report	Carney 33'; Spence 65'; Ji 69'; Blundell 81'; Chapman (yellow card) 90+1'	Stadium: Adams Park; Attendance: 797; Referee: Christopher O’Donnell

7 May 2017 4	Reading	2–3	Manchester City	High Wycombe
14:00 BST (UTC+1)	Moore 59' (yellow card) 90+2'; Allen (yellow card) 68'; Bruton 74' (pen.); Pearce (yellow card) 82'	Report	Parris 6', 76'; Scott 78'; Walsh (yellow card) 80'	Stadium: Adams Park; Attendance: 579; Referee: Paul Forrester

17 May 2017 5	Yeovil United	0–1	Reading	Taunton
19:00 BST (UTC+1)	Jones (yellow card) 9'; Heatherson (yellow card) 33'; Curson (yellow card) 37'; James (yellow card) 86'	Report	van den Berg 8'; Linnett (yellow card) 53'; Furness (yellow card) 54'; Allen (yellow card) 62'; Lahmari (yellow card) 84'	Stadium: Cygnet Health Care; Attendance: 356; Referee: Martin Underhay

28 May 2017 6	Reading	1–1	Birmingham City	High Wycombe
14:00 BST (UTC+1)	van den Berg (yellow card) 48'; Potter (red card) 49'; Bruton 64' (pen.); Scott (yellow card) 87'	Report	Wellings 1'; Carter (yellow card) 48'; Mannion (yellow card) 50'; P.Williams (yellow card) 88'	Stadium: Adams Park; Attendance: 536; Referee: Stephen Bates

31 May 2017 7	Arsenal	1–0	Reading	Canons Park
19:30 BST (UTC+1)	Carter 40'	Report	Pearce (yellow card) 37'; Scott (yellow card) 60'	Stadium: The Hive Stadium; Attendance: 870; Referee: Alan Dale

3 June 2017 8	Sunderland	1–1	Reading	Hetton-le-Hole
15:30 BST (UTC+1)	Staniforth (yellow card) 45'; B.Leon 56'; A.Holmes (yellow card) 64'	Report	Fletcher 29'; Allen (yellow card) 45'	Stadium: Eppleton Colliery Welfare Ground; Attendance: 464; Referee: Paul Brown

==== League table ====
Pos	Team	Pld	W	D	L	GF	GA	GD	Pts
1	Chelsea	8	6	1	1	32	3	+29	19
2	Manchester City	8	6	1	1	17	6	+11	19
3	Arsenal	8	5	3	0	22	9	+13	18
4	Liverpool	8	4	2	2	20	18	+2	14
5	Sunderland	8	2	3	3	4	14	−10	9
6	Reading	8	2	2	4	10	15	−5	8
7	Birmingham City	8	1	4	3	6	10	−4	7
8	Bristol City	8	1	1	6	5	21	−16	4
9	Yeovil Town	8	0	1	7	6	26	−20	1

Source: FA WSL
Rules for classification: 1) Points; 2) Goal difference; 3) Number of goals scored

=== FA Cup ===
18 March 2017 Fifth round	Manchester City	1–0	Reading	Manchester
14:00 GMT (UTC)	Bronze 83'	Report		Stadium: Academy Stadium

== Squad statistics ==
As of match played 3 June 2017

=== Appearances ===
No.	Pos	Nat	Player	Total		WSL		FA Cup	
No.	Pos	Nat	Player	Apps	Goals	Apps	Goals	Apps	Goals
1	GK	(England) ENG	Mary Earps	9	0	8	0	1	0
2	DF	(England) ENG	Becky Jane	8	0	7	0	1	0
3	DF	(Republic of Ireland) IRL	Harriet Scott	9	0	6+2	0	1	0
4	MF	(England) ENG	Kayleigh Hines	3	0	0+3	0	0	0
5	DF	(England) ENG	Molly Bartrip	3	0	2	0	0+1	0
6	DF	(England) ENG	Kirsty McGee	9	0	8	0	1	0
7	MF	(Northern Ireland) NIR	Rachel Furness	8	1	7	1	1	0
8	MF	(England) ENG	Remi Allen	9	0	7+1	0	0+1	0
9	FW	(England) ENG	Lauren Bruton	8	2	7	2	0+1	0
10	MF	(France) FRA	Anissa Lahmari	6	0	1+5	0	0	0
14	DF	(Netherlands) NED	Mandy van den Berg	5	1	3+1	1	1	0
15	DF	(New Zealand) NZL	Anna Green	7	0	6	0	1	0
16	FW	(England) ENG	Kirsty Linnett	6	0	4+2	0	0	0
17	MF	(Wales) WAL	Charlie Estcourt	5	0	3+1	0	1	0
18	MF	(England) ENG	Jade Moore	6	1	4+2	1	0	0
19	FW	(England) ENG	Brooke Chaplen	4	1	3	1	1	0
20	FW	(Wales) WAL	Melissa Fletcher	8	3	5+2	3	1	0
22	DF	(England) ENG	Jo Potter	4	0	3+1	0	0	0
23	MF	(Wales) WAL	Rachel Rowe	5	1	4	1	1	0
Players away from the club on loan:
Players who appeared for Reading but left during the season:

=== Goal scorers ===
Place	Position	Nation	Number	Name	WSL	FA Cup	Total
1	FW	(Wales)	20	Melissa Fletcher	3	0	3
2	FW	(England)	9	Lauren Bruton	2	0	2
3	MF	(Northern Ireland)	7	Rachel Furness	1	0	1
3	MF	(Wales)	23	Rachel Rowe	1	0	1
3	FW	(England)	19	Brooke Chaplen	1	0	1
3	MF	(England)	18	Jade Moore	1	0	1
3	DF	(Netherlands)	14	Mandy van den Berg	1	0	1
Total					10	0	10

=== Clean sheets ===
Place	Position	Nation	Number	Name	WSL	FA Cup	Total
1	GK	(England)	1	Mary Earps	1	0	1
Total					1	0	1

=== Disciplinary record ===
Number	Nation	Position	Name	WSL		FA Cup		Total	
Number	Nation	Position	Name	Booked	Sent off (straight red)	Booked	Sent off (straight red)	Booked	Sent off (straight red)
3	(Republic of Ireland)	DF	Harriet Scott	3	0	0	0	3	0
6	(England)	DF	Kirsty McGee	2	0	0	0	2	0
7	(Northern Ireland)	MF	Rachel Furness	3	0	0	0	3	0
8	(England)	MF	Remi Allen	3	0	0	0	3	0
10	(France)	MF	Anissa Lahmari	1	0	0	0	1	0
14	(Netherlands)	DF	Mandy van den Berg	1	0	0	0	1	0
16	(England)	FW	Kirsty Linnett	1	0	0	0	1	0
18	(England)	MF	Jade Moore	1	0	0	0	1	0
22	(England)	DF	Jo Potter	0	1	0	0	0	1
Players away on loan:
Players who left Reading during the season:
Total				15	1	0	0	15	1

== Honours ==
- 2016–17 PFA Team of the Year: (England) Mary Earps
