= 2018–19 Reading F.C. Women season =

Reading
2018–19 season
- Manager: Kelly Chambers
- Stadium: Adams Park
- WSL: 5th
- FA Cup: Semifinal vs West Ham United
- League Cup: Quarterfinal vs Chelsea
- Top goalscorer: League: Fara Williams (11); All: Fara Williams (19)

The 2018–19 Reading F.C. Women season was the club's 12th season and their third in the FA Women's Super League, the highest level of the football pyramid.

== Season events ==
On 2 July, Reading announced that Jade Moore, Jo Potter and Remi Allen had all extended their contracts with Reading for the 2018–19 season.

On 5 July, Reading announced the signing of Rachael Laws from Sunderland.

On 9 July, Reading announced the double signing of Gemma Davison and Sophie Howard.

On 22 July, Reading signed Millie Farrow from Bristol City.

On 23 July, Reading signed Maz Pacheco from Doncaster Rovers Belles.

On 28 January, Reading announced the signing of Rakel Hönnudóttir from Limhamn Bunkeflo.

On 4 April, Lauren Bruton extended her contract with Reading until the summer of 2021.

On 9 May, Fara Williams signed a new contract with Reading for the 2019–20 season.

== Squad ==
As of match played 11 May 2019

No.	Name	Nationality	Position	Date of birth (Age (Note: Age as of the end of the season))	Signed from	Signed in	Contract ends	Apps.	Goals
Goalkeepers
1	Grace Moloney	(Republic of Ireland)	GK	1 March 1993 (aged 26)	Academy	2009		147	0
27	Rachael Laws	(England)	GK	5 November 1990 (aged 28)	Sunderland	2018		2	0
Defenders
2	Becky Jane	(England)	DF	6 August 1996 (aged 22)	Chelsea	2011	2019		
3	Maz Pacheco	(England)	DF	25 August 1998 (aged 20)	Doncaster Rovers Belles	2018		22	0
5	Molly Bartrip	(England)	DF	1 June 1996 (aged 22)	Academy	2014			
6	Kirsty Pearce	(England)	DF	19 April 1987 (aged 32)	Portsmouth	2014			
22	Jo Potter	(England)	DF	13 November 1984 (aged 34)	Notts County Ladies	2017	2019		
26	Sophie Howard	(Scotland)	DF	17 September 1993 (aged 25)	1899 Hoffenheim	2018		10	0
28	Lily Woodham	(Wales)	DF	3 September 2000 (aged 18)	Bristol City	2018		6	0
29	Kiera Skeels	(England)	DF	20 January 2001 (aged 18)	Academy	2019		0	0
Midfielders
4	Fara Williams	(England)	MF	25 January 1984 (aged 35)	Arsenal	2017	2020		
7	Rachel Furness	(Northern Ireland)	MF	19 June 1988 (aged 30)	Sunderland	2017			
8	Remi Allen	(England)	MF	15 October 1990 (aged 28)	Birmingham City	2016	2019		
9	Gemma Davison	(England)	MF	17 April 1987 (aged 32)	Chelsea	2018		20	4
11	Natasha Harding (captain)	(Wales)	MF	2 March 1989 (aged 30)	Liverpool	2018		40	1
16	Jade Bailey	(England)	MF	17 April 1987 (aged 32)	loan from Chelsea	2019		8	0
17	Charlie Estcourt	(Wales)	MF	27 May 1998 (aged 20)	Chelsea	2015			
18	Jade Moore	(England)	MF	22 October 1990 (aged 28)	Notts County Ladies	2017	2019		
23	Rachel Rowe	(Wales)	MF	13 September 1992 (aged 26)	Swansea City	2015		74	8
Forwards
10	Lauren Bruton	(England)	FW	22 November 1992 (aged 26)	Arsenal	2013	2021		
14	Millie Farrow	(England)	FW	3 June 1996 (aged 22)	Bristol City	2018		6	2
15	Rakel Hönnudóttir	(Iceland)	FW	30 December 1988 (aged 30)	Limhamn Bunkeflo	2019		8	3
19	Brooke Chaplen	(England)	FW	16 April 1989 (aged 30)	Sunderland	2017			
Out on loan
Left during the season

== Transfers ==
=== In ===
Date	Position	Nationality	Name	From	Fee	Ref.
5 July 2018	GK	(England)	Rachael Laws	Sunderland	Undisclosed	
5 July 2018	DF	(Scotland)	Sophie Howard	TSG 1899 Hoffenheim	Undisclosed	
5 July 2018	MF	(England)	Gemma Davison	Chelsea	Undisclosed	
22 July 2018	FW	(England)	Millie Farrow	Bristol City	Undisclosed	
23 July 2018	DF	(England)	Maz Pacheco	Doncaster Rovers Belles	Free	
28 January 2019	FW	(Iceland)	Rakel Hönnudóttir	Limhamn Bunkeflo	Undisclosed	

=== Loans in ===
Start date	Position	Nationality	Name	From	End date	Ref.
3 January 2019	MF	(England)	Jade Bailey	Chelsea	End of season	

=== Out ===
Date	Position	Nationality	Name	To	Fee	Ref.
10 June 2019	DF	(England)	Becky Jane	Liverpool	Undisclosed	

=== Released ===
Date	Position	Nationality	Name	Joined	Date	Ref.
7 July 2018	FW	(Wales)	Melissa Fletcher	Retired		
30 June 2019	DF	(England)	Kirsty Pearce	Retired		

== Competitions ==
=== WSL ===
==== Results summary ====
Overall								Home						Away					
Pld	W	D	L	GF	GA	GD	Pts	W	D	L	GF	GA	GD	W	D	L	GF	GA	GD
20	8	3	9	33	30	+3	27	4	1	5	18	16	+2	4	2	4	15	14	+1

Last updated: 11 May 2019.
Source: FA WSL

==== Results by matchday ====
Round	1	2	3	4	5	6	7	8	9	10	11	12	13	14	15	16	17	18	19	20	21	22
Ground	H	A	H	A	A	-	A	H	A	H	A	H	A	H	H	-	H	A	A	H	A	H
Result	W	D	L	W	L	-	D	W	W	W	L	D	L	L	L	-	L	W	W	W	L	L
Position	2	4	5	4	4	7	5	5	5	4	5	5	5	6	6	6	7	7	6	5	5	5

A = Away; H = Home; W = Win; D = Draw; L = Loss

==== Results ====
9 September 2018 1	Reading	4–0	Yeovil Town	High Wycombe
14:00 BST (UTC+1)	Davison 5'; Williams 11'; Bruton 59' (pen.); Allen 61'	Report	Evans (yellow card) 79'	Stadium: Adams Park; Attendance: 464; Referee: Helen Conley

19 September 2018 2	West Ham United	0–0	Reading	Romford
19:45 BST (UTC+1)	Simic (yellow card) 19'; Simon (yellow card) 64'	Report	Howard (yellow card) 81'	Stadium: Rush Green Stadium; Attendance: 658; Referee: Abby Marriott

23 September 2018 3	Reading	0–1	Birmingham City	High Wycombe
14:00 BST (UTC+1)	Allen (yellow card) 51'; Harding (yellow card) 63'	Report	Sargeant 7'; P.Williams (yellow card) 90+6'	Stadium: Adams Park; Attendance: 693; Referee: Jacob Miles

30 September 2018 4	Liverpool	0–1	Reading	Birkenhead
14:00 BST (UTC+1)	Roberts (yellow card) 37' (yellow-red card) 56'	Report	Chaplen 36'; Bruton (yellow card) 84'	Stadium: Prenton Park; Attendance: 382; Referee: David McNamara

21 October 2018 5	Arsenal	6–0	Reading	Borehamwood
14:00 BST (UTC+1)	Miedema 3', 49', 85'; Nobbs 7'; Mead 45+2' van de Donk 76'	Report	Pearce (yellow card) 8'; Furness (yellow card) 45+1'	Stadium: Meadow Park; Attendance: 1,586; Referee: Abby Marriott

26 October 2018 7	Manchester City	1–1	Reading	Manchester
19:00 BST (UTC+1)	Stanway 33'; Parris (yellow card) 90+1'	Report	Moore 50'; Pearce (yellow card) 68'; Allen (yellow card) 90+5'	Stadium: Academy Stadium; Attendance: 1,015; Referee: David McNamara

4 November 2018 8	Reading	3–0	Bristol City	High Wycombe
14:00 GMT (UTC)	Williams 32', 50'; Chaplen 65'	Report	Rutherford (yellow card) 63'; Kerkdijk (yellow card) 90+1'	Stadium: Adams Park; Attendance: 482; Referee: Abigal Marnot

18 November 2018 9	Brighton & Hove Albion	1–4	Reading	Crawley
14:00 GMT (UTC)	Bowman (yellow card) 27'; A.Whelan 61'	Report	Hourihan 20' (o.g.); Chaplen 58'; Moloney (yellow card) 62'; Williams 65'; Davison 81'	Stadium: Broadfield Stadium; Attendance: 330; Referee: Ryan Atkin

25 November 2018 10	Reading	2–1	Everton	High Wycombe
14:00 GMT (UTC)	Chaplen 20', 77'	Report	Cain 13'; Kelly (yellow card) 46'; Magill (yellow card) 53'	Stadium: Adams Park; Attendance: 625; Referee: Amy Fearn

2 December 2018 11	Chelsea	1–0	Reading	Kingston upon Thames
14:00 GMT (UTC)	Ji 49'	Report		Stadium: Kingsmeadow; Attendance: 1,741; Referee: Lucy Oliver

9 December 2018 12	Reading	2–2	Liverpool	High Wycombe
14:00 GMT (UTC)	Williams 62', 84' (yellow card) 69'; Furness (yellow card) 63'; Bartrip (yellow card) 79'	Report	Sweetman-Kirk 10', 68'	Stadium: Adams Park; Attendance: 582; Referee: Joshua Smith

6 January 2019 13	Birmingham City	2–1	Reading	Solihull
14:00 GMT (UTC)	Harrop (yellow card) 32' (goal) 72'; P.Williams (yellow card) 56'; Sargeant 89'	Report	Moore (yellow card) 23'; Furness (yellow card) 30'; Harding (yellow card) 52'; Allen (yellow card) 82'; Hampton 88' (o.g.)	Stadium: Damson Park; Attendance: 606; Referee: Robert Ellis

27 January 2019 15	Reading	0–3	Arsenal	Reading
12:30 GMT (UTC)	Harding (yellow card) 60'; Allen (yellow card) 76'; Moore (yellow card) 80'	Report	Miedema 2'; Mitchell (yellow card) 23'; McCabe (yellow card) 37' (goal) 90+4'; Mead (yellow card) 74'; Little 80' (pen.)	Stadium: Madejski Stadium; Attendance: 1,269; Referee: Lucy Oliver

20 February 2019 17	Reading	1–2	West Ham United	Reading
19:30 GMT (UTC)	Williams 66' (pen.); Allen (yellow card) 82'	Report	Lehmann 20', 53'	Stadium: Madejski Stadium; Attendance: 2,148; Referee: Rebecca Welch

13 March 2019 18	Reading	3–4	Manchester City	High Wycombe
19:30 GMT (UTC)	Chaplen 3'; Williams 62' (pen.); Pearce 87'	Report	Parris 15', 36', 39' (yellow card) 90+2'; Stokes 54'; McManus (yellow card) 68'	Stadium: Adams Park; Attendance: 449; Referee: Tom Reeves

31 March 2019 19	Bristol City	0–1	Reading	Filton
15:00 BST (UTC+1)		Report	Allen (yellow card) 24'; Williams (penalty missed) 49'; Chaplen 55'	Stadium: Stoke Gifford Stadium; Attendance: 391; Referee: Samuel Allison

17 April 2019 16	Yeovil Town	0–5	Reading	Dorchester
19:45 BST (UTC+1)	Cousins (yellow card) 57'	Report	Williams 33'; Davison (yellow card) 44'; Bruton 54', 83'; Farrow 80', 90'	Stadium: Clayson Stadium; Attendance: 407; Referee: Scott Jackson

20 April 2019 20	Reading	1–0	Brighton & Hove Albion	Reading
13:00 BST (UTC+1)	Furness 49'	Report		Stadium: Madejski Stadium; Attendance: 1,119; Referee: Amy Fearn

28 April 2019 21	Everton	3–2	Reading	Southport
14:00 BST (UTC+1)	Kaagman 40'; Boye-Hlorkah 52'; Magill 59'; Worm (yellow card) 86'; Stringer (yellow card) 89'	Report	Allen 8'; Pearce (yellow card) 53'; Williams 77'	Stadium: Haig Avenue; Attendance: 174; Referee: Andrew Kitchen

11 May 2019 22	Reading	2–3	Chelsea	High Wycombe
12:30 BST (UTC+1)	Harding 50'; Williams 52'; Allen (yellow card) 75'	Report	Ji 8'; Carney 51'; England 64'	Stadium: Adams Park; Attendance: 612; Referee: Abigail Bryne

==== Table ====
Pos	Team	Pld	W	D	L	GF	GA	GD	Pts
3	Chelsea	20	12	6	2	46	14	+32	42
4	Birmingham City	20	13	1	6	29	17	+12	40
5	Reading	20	8	3	9	33	30	+3	27
6	Bristol City	20	7	4	9	17	34	−17	25
7	West Ham United	20	7	2	11	25	37	−12	23

Source: FA WSL
Rules for classification: 1) Points; 2) Goal difference; 3) Number of goals scored

=== FA Cup ===
11 February 2019 Fourth Round	Reading	13–0	Keynsham Town	Woking
14:00 GMT (UTC)	Williams 21' (pen.), 24', 28' (pen.), 55' (pen.), 59'; Bruton 37', 53'; Chaplen 48', 49'; Estcourt 68'; Hönnudóttir 78', 80'; Davison 84'	Report		Stadium: Kingfield Stadium

17 February 2019 Fifth Round	Reading	2–1	Birmingham City	High Wycombe
14:00 GMT (UTC)	Pacheco (yellow card) 45'; Allen (yellow card) 52'; Pearce 69'; Hönnudóttir 84' (yellow card) 90+3'	Report	Mannion 77'	Stadium: Adams Park; Referee: Alex Blake

17 March 2019 Quarterfinal	Reading	3–2 (a.e.t.)	Manchester United	High Wycombe
14:00 GMT (UTC)	Allen 101'; Furness 108'; Hönnudóttir 120+6'	Report	Greenwood 98'; Harding 106' (o.g.)	Stadium: Adams Park; Attendance: 951

14 April 2019 Semifinal	Reading	1–1 (a.e.t.) (3–4 p)	West Ham United	High Wycombe
12:30 BST (UTC+1)	Furness 48'; Potter (yellow card); Harding (yellow card); Moore (yellow card); Bruton (yellow card)	Report	Lehmann 56'; Cho (yellow card); Simon (yellow card)	Stadium: Adams Park; Attendance: 2,334
	Penalties
	Davison (penalty scored); Hönnudóttir (penalty missed); Bruton (penalty missed); Furness (penalty scored); Allen (penalty scored); Moore (penalty missed)		(penalty scored) Ross; (penalty missed) Visalli; (penalty scored) Leon; (penalty missed) Longhurst; (penalty scored) Flaherty; (penalty scored) So-Hyun

=== League Cup ===
==== Group stage ====
Pos	Team	Pld	W	WPEN	LPEN	L	GF	GA	GD	Pts	Qualification
1	Manchester United	4	3	0	0	1	5	2	+3	9	Advance to knock-out stage
2	Reading	4	2	0	1	1	9	5	+4	7	Advance to knock-out stage
3	Everton	4	2	0	0	2	6	7	−1	6	
4	Durham	4	1	0	1	2	5	8	−3	4	
5	Liverpool	4	0	2	0	2	5	8	−3	4	

Source: thefa.com
Rules for classification: 1) Points; 2) Goal difference; 3) Number of goals scored

19 August 2018 1	Reading	4–1	Durham	High Wycombe
14:00 BST (UTC+1)	Pearce 6'; Williams 13', 24', 81'	Report	R.Lee (yellow card) 16'; B.Hepple 80' (pen.)	Stadium: Adams Park

25 August 2018 2	Manchester United	0–2	Reading	Leigh
12:00 BST (UTC+1)	James (yellow card) 59'	Report	Bartrip (yellow card) 41'; Chaplen 56'; Bruton (yellow card) 61'; Davison 90+4'	Stadium: Leigh Sports Village

16 September 2018 3	Everton	3–2	Reading	Southport
12:00 BST (UTC+1)	Walker 14', 27'; Kaagman 56'; Bruinenberg (yellow card) 90'	Report	Finnigan 24' (o.g.); Chaplen 79'	Stadium: Haig Avenue

12 December 2018 4	Reading	1–1 (4 – 5 p)	Liverpool	High Wycombe
19:30 GMT (UTC)	Furness 64'; Jane (yellow card) 85'	Report	Kitching (yellow card) 49'; Sweetman-Kirk 66'	Stadium: Adams Park

==== Knockout stage ====
9 January 2019 Quarterfinal	Chelsea	4–0	Reading	Kingston upon Thames
19:30 GMT (UTC)	Kirby 3', 86'; Asante 37'; Riley 90+1'	Report		Stadium: Kingsmeadow; Attendance: 973

== Squad statistics ==
As of match played 11 May 2019

=== Appearances ===
No.	Pos	Nat	Player	Total		WSL		FA Cup		League Cup	
No.	Pos	Nat	Player	Apps	Goals	Apps	Goals	Apps	Goals	Apps	Goals
1	GK	(Republic of Ireland) IRL	Grace Moloney	27	0	20	0	4	0	3	0
2	DF	(England) ENG	Becky Jane	14	0	3+5	0	1	0	2+3	0
3	DF	(England) ENG	Maz Pacheco	22	0	14+2	0	4	0	2	0
4	MF	(England) ENG	Fara Williams	29	19	20	11	4	5	5	3
5	DF	(England) ENG	Molly Bartrip	22	0	7+7	0	4	0	4	0
6	DF	(England) ENG	Kirsty Pearce	24	3	17+1	1	1+1	1	4	1
7	MF	(Northern Ireland) NIR	Rachel Furness	25	3	16+3	1	3	1	3	1
8	MF	(England) ENG	Remi Allen	26	2	19	2	3	0	2+2	0
9	MF	(England) ENG	Gemma Davison	20	4	8+6	2	0+2	1	3+1	1
10	FW	(England) ENG	Lauren Bruton	25	5	15+2	3	4	2	4	0
11	MF	(Wales) WAL	Natasha Harding	27	1	19	1	3	0	4+1	0
14	FW	(England) ENG	Millie Farrow	6	2	2+3	2	0	0	0+1	0
15	FW	(Iceland) ISL	Rakel Hönnudóttir	8	3	2+3	0	0+3	3	0	0
16	MF	(England) ENG	Jade Bailey	8	0	3+3	0	2	0	0	0
17	MF	(Wales) WAL	Charlie Estcourt	10	1	4+3	0	1	1	2	0
18	MF	(England) ENG	Jade Moore	18	1	12+1	1	3+1	0	1	0
19	MF	(England) ENG	Brooke Chaplen	24	11	16	7	3	2	5	2
22	DF	(England) ENG	Jo Potter	25	0	16	0	4	0	4+1	0
23	MF	(Wales) WAL	Rachel Rowe	3	0	1	0	0	0	2	0
26	DF	(Scotland) SCO	Sophie Howard	10	0	5+1	0	0+1	0	2+1	0
27	GK	(England) ENG	Rachael Laws	2	0	0	0	0	0	2	0
28	DF	(Wales) WAL	Lily Woodham	6	0	1+3	0	0	0	1+1	0
Players away from the club on loan:
Players who appeared for Reading but left during the season:

=== Goal scorers ===
Place	Position	Nation	Number	Name	WSL	FA Cup	League Cup	Total
1	MF	(England)	4	Fara Williams	11	5	3	19
2	MF	(England)	19	Brooke Chaplen	7	2	2	11
3	FW	(England)	10	Lauren Bruton	3	2	0	5
4	MF	(England)	9	Gemma Davison	2	1	1	4
4	FW	(Iceland)	15	Rakel Hönnudóttir	0	4	0	4
4	MF	(Northern Ireland)	7	Rachel Furness	1	2	1	4
7	MF	(England)	8	Remi Allen	2	1	0	3
7	DF	(England)	6	Kirsty Pearce	1	1	1	3
7				Own goal	2	0	1	3
10	FW	(England)	14	Millie Farrow	2	0	0	2
11	MF	(Wales)	11	Natasha Harding	1	0	0	1
11	18	(England)	18	Jade Moore	1	0	0	1
11	MF	(Wales)	17	Charlie Estcourt	0	1	0	1
Total					33	19	9	61

=== Clean sheets ===
Place	Position	Nation	Number	Name	WSL	FA Cup	League Cup	Total
1	GK	(Republic of Ireland)	1	Grace Moloney	7	1	1	9
Total					7	1	1	9

=== Disciplinary record ===
Number	Nation	Position	Name	WSL		FA Cup		League Cup		Total	
Number	Nation	Position	Name	Yellow card	Red card	Yellow card	Red card	Yellow card	Red card	Yellow card	Red card
1	(Republic of Ireland)	GK	Grace Moloney	1	0	0	0	0	0	1	0
2	(England)	DF	Becky Jane	0	0	0	0	1	0	1	0
3	(England)	DF	Maz Pacheco	0	0	1	0	0	0	1	0
4	(England)	MF	Fara Williams	1	0	0	0	0	0	1	0
5	(England)	DF	Molly Bartrip	1	0	0	0	1	0	2	0
6	(England)	DF	Kirsty Pearce	3	0	0	0	0	0	3	0
7	(Northern Ireland)	MF	Rachel Furness	3	0	0	0	0	0	3	0
8	(England)	MF	Remi Allen	7	0	1	0	0	0	8	0
9	(England)	MF	Gemma Davison	1	0	0	0	0	0	1	0
10	(England)	FW	Lauren Bruton	1	0	1	0	1	0	3	0
11	(Wales)	MF	Natasha Harding	3	0	1	0	0	0	4	0
15	(Iceland)	FW	Rakel Hönnudóttir	0	0	1	0	0	0	1	0
18	(England)	MF	Jade Moore	2	0	1	0	0	0	3	0
22	(England)	DF	Jo Potter	0	0	1	0	0	0	1	0
26	(Scotland)	DF	Sophie Howard	1	0	0	0	0	0	1	0
Players away on loan:
Players who left Reading during the season:
Total				24	0	7	0	3	0	34	0
