= Brooke Chaplen =

English footballer

Personal information
- Full name: Brooke Amberlee Chaplen
- Date of birth: 16 April 1989 (age 37)
- Place of birth: Portsmouth, England
- Positions: Midfielder; forward

Youth career
- 2002–2005: Southampton

Senior career*
Years	Team	Apps	(Gls)
2005–2008	Portsmouth		
2008–2009	Chelsea		
2009–2014	Everton	51	(3)
2015–2016	Sunderland	25	(6)
2017–2022	Reading	67	(20)

International career
2008	England U19	7	(1)
2008	England U20	4	(1)
2010–2012	England U23	8	(0)

Managerial career
- 2022–2024: Reading (General Manager)
- 2024-: Portsmouth (Head of Football)
- * Club domestic league appearances and goals

Brooke Amberlee Chaplen (born 16 April 1989) is an English former footballer and current Head of Football at Portsmouth. As a midfielder, Chaplen played for Portsmouth, Chelsea, Everton, Sunderland and Reading at club level, and represented England at U-19, U-20 and U-23 level.

== Club career ==
=== Early career ===
Chaplen played for local teams Southampton and Portsmouth at the beginning of her career. Brooke scored for Portsmouth in the 5–0 league win over Reading Royals in February 2006, and in the 2–1 victory against Millwall Lionesses in April 2007. She joined Chelsea for the 2008–09 season. only spending a year at the club before moving on to Everton. She scored once in the league for Chelsea, in the 5–0 away win at Fulham on 28 August 2008. Chaplen also scored and claimed three assists in Chelsea's 9–1 demolition of Rotherham in the Women's FA Cup on 4 January 2009. Chaplen played for Portsmouth from 2005 until 2008. She had played for rivals Southampton from 2002, as a youth player.

=== Everton L.F.C. ===
Chaplen joined the Blues at the start of the 2009–10 season. She played a big role in Everton's 2010–11 UEFA Women's Champions League campaign, scoring a hat-trick against MTK Hungaria in the round of 32, as well as a brace against Denmark's Brondby IF a month later in the round of 16. So far Chaplen has made ten league appearances for the Blues, featuring in the 1–0 derby win over Liverpool in July 2011 and the 3–1 win over former club Chelsea in August. She made her FA WSL debut for the Toffees in the 1–1 draw with Doncaster Rovers Belles on 20 April 2011.

=== Sunderland A.F.C. Ladies ===
When the 2014 campaign ended in Everton's relegation, Chaplen was handed a free transfer. She signed for Sunderland Ladies, who replaced Everton in the top flight, prior to the following season.

=== Reading ===
Chaplen joined Reading in 2017 and had an impressive debut season, ending as the club's top scorer. On 15 February 2020, she signed a new contract extension with the club until June 2021.

In February 2022, Reading confirmed that Chaplen had been ruled out for an indefinite amount of time after a bone tumour had been found in her right leg. On 28 April 2022, Chaplen announced her retirement from football as a result of the successful operation on her right leg.

== International career ==
=== England U-19 ===
Chaplen made her debut for the U-19s on 7 July 2008 against Germany. She made seven appearances for the team, with her final U-19 game coming against the United States on 30 November 2008.

=== England U-20 ===
Chaplen was part of England's squad for the 2008 FIFA U-20 Women's World Cup in Chile. The midfielder played and scored in England's opening game, a 2–0 win over Chile on 19 November 2008. She went on to play in the games against Nigeria on 22 November and New Zealand on 26 November as England came second in their group to qualify for the quarter-finals. Chaplen started the quarter-final against the USA but was substituted in the second half as England lost 3–0 and crashed out. In total, Chaplen played four games for England U-20s, scoring one goal.

=== England U-23 ===
In 2010, Chaplen was called up to the England Women's U-23 squad for the Four Nations Tournament. She had made her debut for the side against Germany in February 2010, and her most recent appearance for the side was on 25 February 2011, in the 1–1 draw with Norway. The Norway match was part of the La Manga tournament, where England also played against the USA and Sweden.

== Post-playing career ==
On 4 July 2022, Chaplen was appointed as General Manager of Reading. She left the role in July 2024 following the clubs transition into a Tier 5 side. The next month, Chaplen returned to her hometown club Portsmouth as head of football for the women's team.

== Career statistics ==
=== Club ===
As of match played 21 November 2021

Appearances and goals by club, season and competition
Club	Season	League			National Cup		League Cup		Total	
Club	Season	Division	Apps	Goals	Apps	Goals	Apps	Goals	Apps	Goals
Reading	2017	FA WSL	3	1	1	0	-		4	1
Reading	2017–18	FA WSL	18	8			6	4	23	12
Reading	2018–19	FA WSL	16	7	3	2	5	2	24	11
Reading	2019–20	FA WSL	14	3	2	1	6	2	22	6
Reading	2020–21	FA WSL	8	1	0	0	3	1	11	2
Reading	2021–22	FA WSL	8	0	0	0	2	2	10	2
Reading	Total		67	20	6	3	22	11	95	34
Career total			67	20	6	3	22	11	95	34

== Honours ==
Everton

- Women's FA Cup: 2009–10
