= Garth Hill College =

Location
- Bull Lane; Bracknell, Berkshire, RG42 2AD; England; 51.41967°N 0.74698°W

Information
- Type: Community school
- Local authority: Bracknell Forest Council
- Department for Education URN: 110069 Tables
- Ofsted: Reports
- Principal: Keith Grainger
- Gender: Coeducational
- Age: 11 to 18
- Houses: Brownlow; Fielden; Haversham; Lawrence
- Colours: Navy blue & yellow
- Website: https://www.garthhillcollege.com

Garth Hill College (also Garth Hill and Garth) is a coeducational secondary school and sixth form located in Bracknell, Berkshire, England.

It was created as Garth Hill School (a Comprehensive) in September 1969 from an amalgamation of Wick Hill Secondary Modern School (opened 1956) and neighbouring Garth Grammar School (opened 1965), the name of the latter referring to a former local fox hunt. The school underwent a £40 million rebuild in 2010, and was opened in September of the same year. However, it wasn't officially opened by Princess Anne until March 10, 2011. The school has recently gained yet another new building for the sixth form of Garth Hill, costing £6 million and opened in 2015 by the Mayor of Bracknell.

== Notable students ==
- Melissa Fletcher, Welsh national footballer
- David Thorpe (motorcyclist), former professional motocross racer and racing team manager
- Ady Williams, former Wales international footballer and former football manager
