= Rachel Rowe =

Welsh footballer (born 1992)

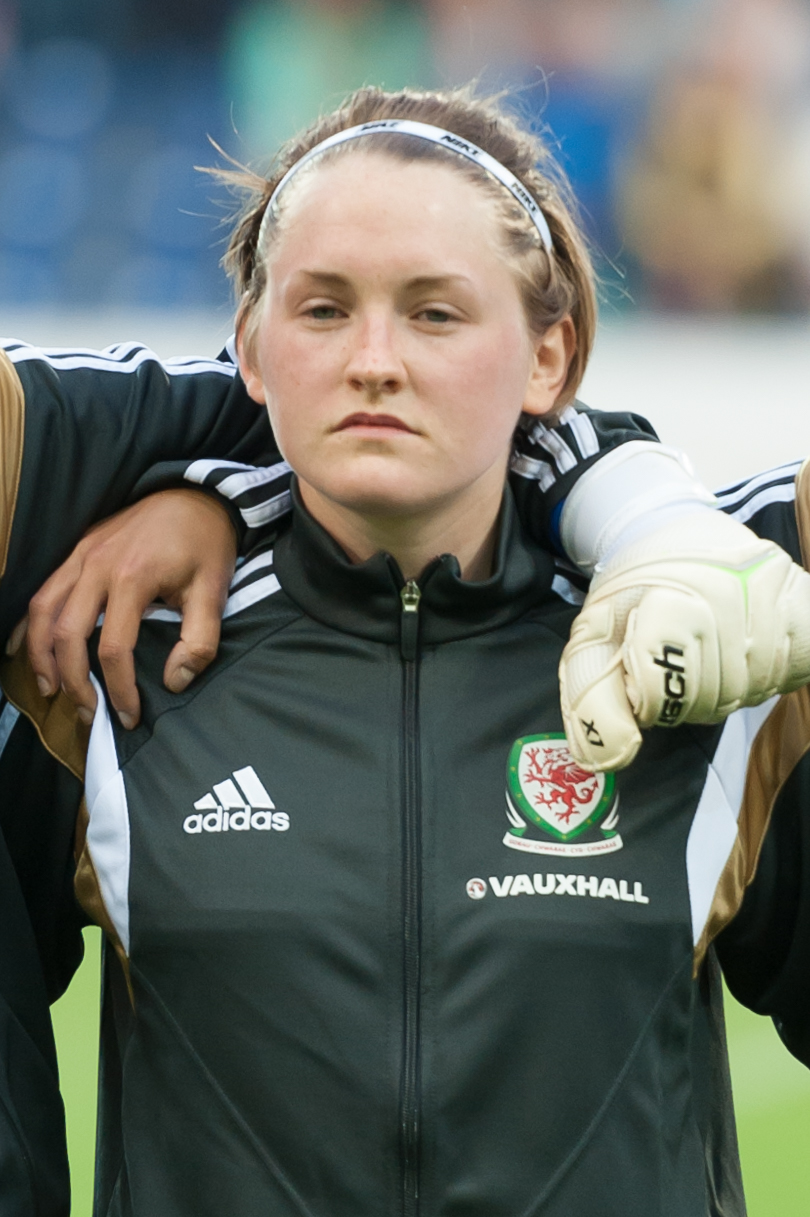
- Rowe for Wales in 2015

Personal information
- Full name: Rachel Susan Rowe
- Date of birth: 13 September 1992 (age 34)
- Place of birth: Swansea
- Height: 1.60 m (5 ft 3 in)
- Position: Midfielder

Team information
- Current team: Nottingham Forest
- Number: 13

Youth career
- 2008-13: Swansea City

Senior career*
Years	Team	Apps	(Gls)
2013–2014	Cardiff City		
2014–2015	Swansea City		
2015–2023	Reading	152	(14)
2023–2024	Rangers	19	(4)
2024–2025	Southampton	14	(0)
2025–	Nottingham Forest	23	(0)

International career^{‡}
2010–2011	Wales U19	6	(1)
2015–	Wales	89	(9)
- * Club domestic league appearances and goals as of 8 November 2026 ‡ National team caps and goals as of 18 October 2026

Rachel Susan Rowe (born 13 September 1992) is a Welsh professional footballer who plays as a forward for Women's Championship club Nottingham Forest and the Wales national team.

Rowe began her senior career with Cardiff City before joining Swansea City in 2013. After two seasons, she joined Reading in February 2015, initially combining her playing career with a job in the prison service. She turned professional later the same year after helping the club win promotion to the FA Women's Super League. She made her international debut for Wales in 2017.

== Early life ==
Rowe lived in Swansea, Wales where she began playing football at a young age. Her father suffered from alcoholism and she later commented that their "relationship deteriorated" due to his drinking before his death when Rowe was 21. She took a job at HM Prison Swansea as an Operational Support Grade (OSG) and later fulfilled the same role at HM Prison Cardiff. She later enrolled on a business management course provided by the Welsh Government.

== Club career ==
Rowe initially played for a local boys youth team but later joined Ladore colts, she then joined Swansea City Ladies and played for the club's youth academy. winning the Welsh Premier Women's Football League multiple times, she also played for Cardiff scoring in their decisive 5–2 victory over Wrexham in the final game of the season.She returned to Swansea during the summer window soon after. However, she suffered a broken leg while playing against her former team during the first half of the following campaign.

In February 2015, Rowe joined WSL 2 side Reading with assistant manager Kelly Chambers describing her as possessing "an abundance of competitiveness along with her pace, strength and work rate". Despite the move, Rowe remained semi-professional during her first year, making the 300-mile round trip from her home in Swansea to training three times every week while remaining in her job with the prison service. In December 2015, she signed a professional contract with Reading following the club's promotion to FA Women's Super League. Following promotion, Rowe converted to playing as a full-back for a period, having originally joined the club as a winger.

At the start of the 2018–19 season, she featured in a 1–0 victory over Liverpool. However, the following month, she suffered an anterior cruciate ligament injury in a friendly match that ended her season after a single appearance. Despite her injury setback, she was offered a new contract with the club at the end of the campaign. On 7 November 2020, Rowe played her 100th game for Reading.

In March 2021, Rowe signed a new three-year contract with Reading. Rowe left Reading at the end of the 2022–23 season following their relegation to the Women's Championship.

On 21 July 2023, Rowe signed for Scottish Women's Premier League club Rangers.

On 14 June 2024, she signed for Women's Championship club Southampton.

On 19 August 2025, Rowe was announced at Nottingham Forest on a two year contract.

== International career ==
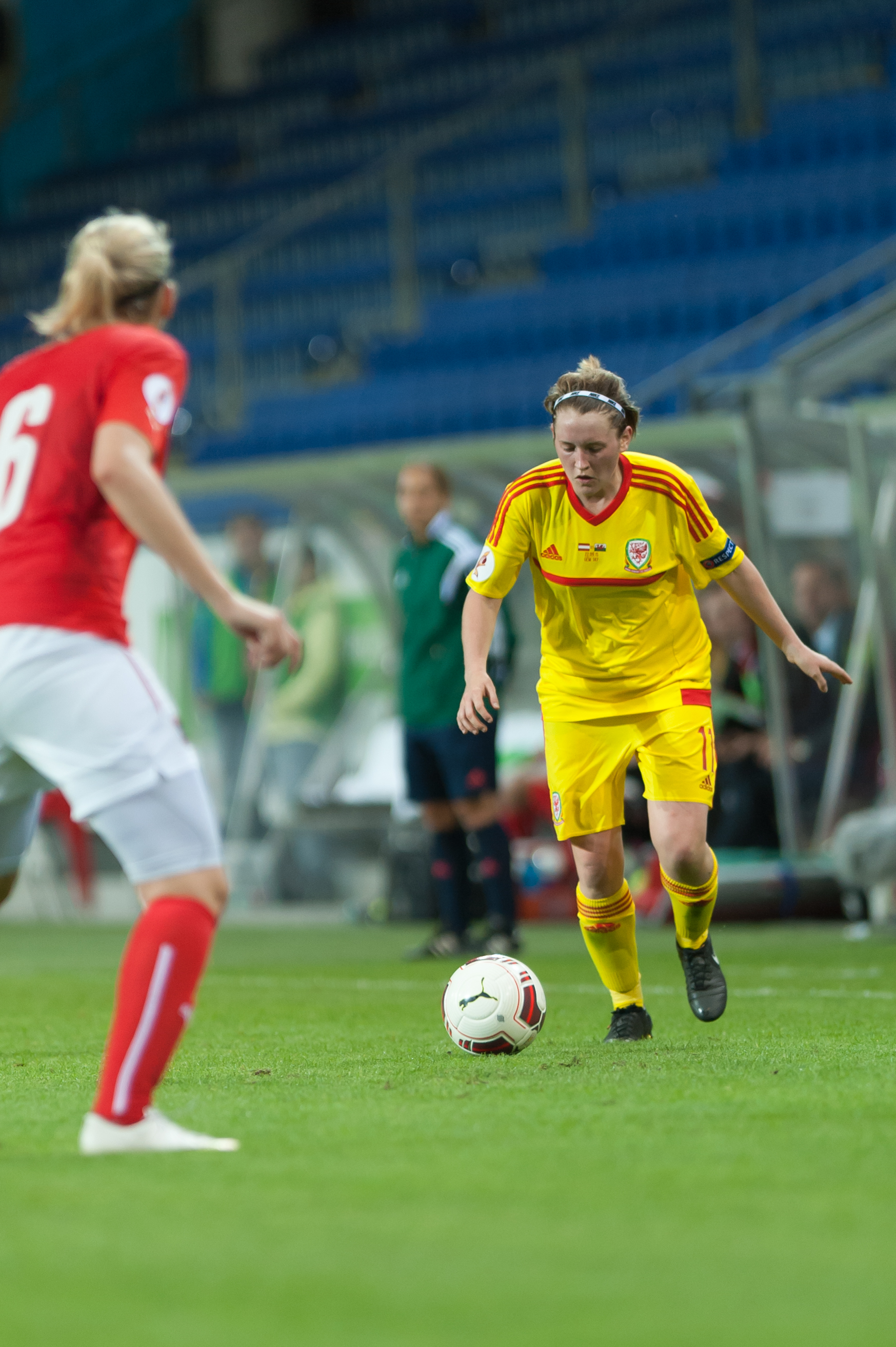
Rowe (right) during her international debut in 2015

Having previously represented Wales at under-17 and under-19 level, Rowe made her debut for the senior side in an international friendly in March 2015 against Costa Rica in a 1-0 victory.

She made her international debut despite still working within the prison service.

In 2022 she earned her 50th cap in a FIFA Women's World Cup 2023 qualifying playoff tie against Bosnia and Herzegovina. Heading into the UEFA Women's Euro 2025, she has 76 caps for Cymru.

In June 2025, Rowe was named in Wales' squad for UEFA Women's Euro 2025.

== Career statistics ==
=== Club ===
As of match played 18 November 2026.

Appearances and goals by club, season and competition
Club	Season	League			National Cup		League Cup		Continental		Total	
Club	Season	Division	Apps	Goals	Apps	Goals	Apps	Goals	Apps	Goals	Apps	Goals
Reading	2015	WSL 2	16	0	0	0	6	0	—		22	0
Reading	2016	WSL	16	1	2	0	1	0	—		19	1
Reading	2017	WSL	4	1	1	0	0	0	—		5	1
Reading	2017–18	WSL	18	4	1	0	6	1	—		25	5
Reading	2018–19	WSL	1	0	0	0	2	0	—		3	1
Reading	2019–20	WSL	12	0	2	0	5	0	—		19	0
Reading	2020–21	WSL	19	5	1	1	3	0	—		23	6
Reading	2021–22	WSL	14	1	1	1	1	0	—		16	1
Reading	2022–23	WSL	18	3	3	0	3	0	—		24	3
Reading	Total		118	14	11	2	27	1	—		156	18
Rangers	2023–24	SWPL	19	4	1	1	1	0	—		21	5
Southampton	2024–25	FA Women's Championship	14	0	1	0	2	0	—		17	0
Nottingham Forest	2025–26	Women's Super League 2	18	0	2	0	1	0	—		21	0
Nottingham Forest	2026–27	Women's Super League 2	5	0	0	0	3	0	—		8	0
Nottingham Forest	Total		23	0	2	0	4	0	—		29	0
Career total			174	18	15	3	34	1	—		223	23

=== International appearances ===
As of matches played 3 June 2025. Statistics from the Football Association of Wales

Appearances and goals by national team and year
National team	Year	Apps	Goals
Wales	2015	8	0
Wales	2016	7	0
Wales	2017	9	0
Wales	2018	6	0
Wales	2019	2	1
Wales	2020	5	1
Wales	2021	5	1
Wales	2022	13	0
Wales	2023	6	2
Wales	2024	11	3
Wales	2025	4	0
Total		76	8

=== International goals ===
No.	Date	Venue	Opponent	Score	Result	Competition
1.	8 October 2019	Borisov Arena, Barysaw, Belarus	Belarus	0-1	0-1	UEFA Women's Euro 2022 qualifying
2.	1 December 2020	Rodney Parade, Newport, Wales	Belarus	2–0	3–0	UEFA Women's Euro 2022 qualifying
3.	17 September 2021	Parc y Scarlets, Llanelli, Wales	Kazakhstan	3–0	6–0	2023 FIFA Women's World Cup qualification
4.	6 April 2023	Cardiff City Stadium, Cardiff, Wales	Northern Ireland	4–0	4–1	Friendly
5.	11 April 2023	Estádio D. Afonso Henriques, Guimarães, Portugal	Portugal	1-1	1–1	Friendly
6.	5 April 2024	Racecourse Ground, Wrexham, Wales	Croatia	3–0	4–0	UEFA Women's Euro 2025 qualifying
7.	9 April 2024	Zahir Pajaziti Stadium, Podujevo, Kosovo	Kosovo	0-1	6–0	UEFA Women's Euro 2025 qualifying
8.	9 April 2024	Zahir Pajaziti Stadium, Podujevo, Kosovo	Kosovo	0-3	6–0	UEFA Women's Euro 2025 qualifying
9.	7 March 2026	Parc y Scarlets, Llanelli, Wales	Montenegro	2–0	6–1	2027 FIFA Women's World Cup qualification

== Honours ==
=== Individual ===
- FA Women's Super League Goal of the Month: October 2022

==== Rangers ====
- Scottish Women's Cup: 2023–24
