= Grace Moloney =

Irish footballer (born 1993)

Personal information
- Full name: Grace Maria Moloney
- Date of birth: 1 March 1993 (age 33)
- Place of birth: Slough, England
- Height: 5 ft 7 in (1.70 m)
- Position: Goalkeeper

Team information
- Current team: Southampton

Youth career
- Slough Juniors
- Reading
- QPR
- Reading

Senior career*
Years	Team	Apps	(Gls)
2009–2023	Reading	93	(0)
2016	→ Aston Villa (loan)		
2023–2025	London City Lionesses	21	(0)
2025–2026	Sunderland	14	(0)
2026–	Southampton	0	(0)

International career^{‡}
2010–2011	Ireland U17	8	(0)
2011–2012	Ireland U19	6	(0)
2016–	Ireland	9	(0)
- * Club domestic league appearances and goals as of 1 July 2026 ‡ National team caps and goals as of 1 July 2026

Grace Maria Moloney (born 1 March 1993) is a professional footballer who plays as a goalkeeper for Women's Super League 2 club Southampton. Born in England, she represents the Republic of Ireland at international level and was a part of their squad for the 2023 FIFA Women's World Cup.

== Early life ==
Moloney was born on 1 March 1993 in Slough, Berkshire to Bill Moloney. Her paternal grandfather is from County Tipperary and paternal grandmother from County Cavan.

She is a life-long fan of Celtic (her family team), she played for QPR, later on moving to Reading during her youth career, later moving back due to the facilities available to allow her to pursue her sport at an international level. Her father Bill, her self-confessed number one fan, travels to all her international games.

== Club career ==
=== Reading ===
Moloney played for Reading in the second-division FA WSL 2 during the 2015 FA WSL season. She helped the team win the league before signing a professional contract with them ahead of the 2016 season in the FAWSL 1. When Reading subsequently signed Mary Earps, Moloney was largely restricted to playing in the FA Women's League Cup.

=== Aston Villa (loan) ===
In June 2016 Moloney joined Aston Villa on loan.

=== Reading ===
In April 2019 Moloney signed a new contract with Reading. She had re-established herself as the first choice goalkeeper and helped the club reach the FA Women's Cup semi-final, which they lost to West Ham United on a penalty shootout. Reading recognised Moloney's 150th appearance for the club with a presentation before a 1–0 2019–20 FA Women's League Cup defeat by West Ham in November 2019. She signed another two-year contract extension with Reading in February 2021.

On 6 March 2022, Moloney made her 200th appearance for Reading.

=== London City Lionesses ===
On 15 August 2023 Moloney joined London City Lionesses on a 2-year contract. She parted ways with the club by mutual consent in January 2025.

=== Sunderland ===
On 12 July 2025. Moloney signed a one-year deal with Wearside club Sunderland in the Women's Super League 2 with the option of an additional year. On 29 May 2026, Sunderland announced that Moloney had departed the club after one season in red and white after making 15 appearances. Moloney last featured in a WSL 2 game on February 20, playing a full 90 minutes for Sunderland against Durham in a 3-2 win.

== International career ==
=== Youth ===
In 2010, Moloney was a key member of the Republic of Ireland U-17 squad who were runners-up in the 2010 UEFA Women's Under-17 Championship and quarter-finalists in the 2010 FIFA U-17 Women's World Cup. At the FAI International Football Awards she was named 2011 Under-19 Women's International Player of the Year.

=== Senior ===
Moloney was included in the senior Republic of Ireland women's national football team for the first time in August 2010, for a friendly against the Netherlands, followed by 2011 FIFA World Cup qualifying fixtures against Russia and Israel. She returned to the senior squad as the third goalkeeper for the 2014 Cyprus Cup, but had to make a late withdrawal after she injured her back while training with Reading.

On 5 May 2014, Republic of Ireland women's national football team manager Susan Ronan named Moloney in an experimental squad for a friendly against the Basque Country. Moloney replaced Eve Badana at half-time to play the second half of Ireland's 2–0 defeat in Azpeitia, which was not classified as a full international fixture.

Moloney won her first senior cap at the 2016 Cyprus Cup, playing the full match in Ireland's opening 2–0 defeat by Austria. Despite the result, the Football Association of Ireland's website praised Moloney's "assured performance", while she expressed pride and delight at achieving her longstanding ambition of playing for Ireland at senior level. In August 2016 Ronan called up Moloney to a young and predominantly home-based senior squad for a training camp in Wales. She played in the first of two challenge matches against the Welsh hosts, a 0–0 draw at Rodney Parade in Newport.

Colin Bell replaced Sue Ronan as Ireland's coach in February 2017 and he soon installed Marie Hourihan as the long-term goalkeeping successor to Emma Byrne, believing Moloney to be too small. On 9 October 2018, Moloney played in Ireland's 4–0 friendly defeat by Poland in Ostróda, coming on for Hourihan at half-time.

Moloney was given her first competitive appearance in an important UEFA Women's Euro 2022 qualifier against Germany at Tallaght Stadium on 1 December 2020. She won the confidence of coach Vera Pauw due to her improved form at club level with Reading. Despite Ireland's 3–1 defeat Moloney's performance was hailed as "fantastic" by Pauw.

== Career statistics ==
=== Club ===
As of match played 3 March 2024

Appearances and goals by club, season and competition
Club	Season	League			National Cup		League Cup		Total	
Club	Season	Division	Apps	Goals	Apps	Goals	Apps	Goals	Apps	Goals
Reading	2014	FA WSL	0	0	0	0	1	0	1	0
Reading	2015	FA WSL	0	0	0	0	6	0	6	0
Reading	2016	FA WSL	4	0	0	0	0	0	4	0
Reading	2017	FA WSL	0	0	0	0	1	0	0	0
Reading	2017–18	FA WSL	4	0	0	0	6	0	10	0
Reading	2018–19	FA WSL	20	0	4	0	3	0	27	0
Reading	2019–20	FA WSL	10	0	1	0	1	0	12	0
Reading	2020–21	FA WSL	22	0	1	0	2	0	25	0
Reading	2021–22	FA WSL	20	0	0	0	3	0	23	0
Reading	2022–23	FA WSL	13	0	3	0	1	0	17	0
Reading	Total		93	0	9	0	23	0	125	0
London City Lionesses	2023–24	Championship	15	0	1	0	3	0	19	0
London City Lionesses	2024–25	Championship	2	0	0	0	3	0	5	0
London City Lionesses	Total		17	0	1	0	6	0	24	0
Sunderland	2025–26	WSL 2	14	0	1	0	0	0	15	0
Career total			124	0	11	0	29	0	164	0

=== International Appearances ===
Appearances by national team and year
National team	Year	Apps
Republic of Ireland	2016	2
Republic of Ireland	2018	1
Republic of Ireland	2020	1
Republic of Ireland	2021	2
Republic of Ireland	2024	1
Republic of Ireland	2025	2
Total		9

== Honours ==
=== Association football ===
- 2011: FAI International Football Awards Under-19 Women's International Player of the Year
