= 2021–22 Reading F.C. Women season =

Reading
2021–22 season
- Manager: Kelly Chambers
- Stadium: Select Car Leasing Stadium
- WSL: 8th
- FA Cup: Fifth Round vs West Ham United
- League Cup: Group stage
- Top goalscorer: League: Natasha Dowie (6); All: Natasha Dowie (7)
- Highest home attendance: 1,127 vs Arsenal (12 September 2021)
- Lowest home attendance: 501 vs Leicester City (9 January 2022)
- Average home league attendance: 790 (24 April 2022)
Home colours	Away colours

The 2021–22 Reading F.C. Women season was the club's 15th season and their seventh in the FA Women's Super League, the highest level of the football pyramid.

== Season events ==
On 30 June, Reading announced the signing of Natasha Dowie.

On 5 July, Reading announced the signing of Gemma Evans to a two-year contract.

On 6 July, Reading announced the signing of Faye Bryson to a two-year contract, and that Bethan Roberts had signed her first professional contract with the club, until the summer of 2023.

On 8 July, Reading announced the signing of Chloe Peplow.

On 28 July, Reading announced the signing of Deanne Rose to a two-year contract.

On 5 August, Reading announced that they had extended their contracts with Jeon Ga-eul and Amalie Eikeland for the 2021–22 season.

On 17 August, Reading announced the signing of Justine Vanhaevermaet to a two-year contract.

On 10 December, Kelly Chambers was awarded the manager of the month award for November.

On 17 December, Reading's match against Manchester City scheduled for 19 December, was postponed due to positive COVID-19 cases within the Manchester City squad.

On 21 December, Reading announced the signing of Sanne Troelsgaard Nielsen on a contract until June 2023.

On 27 December, Reading announced that Jeon Ga-eul had left the club.

On 15 January, Reading's match against Arsenal scheduled for 16 January, was postponed on 15 January due to positive COVID-19 cases within the Reading squad.

On 24 January, Reading's match against Manchester City scheduled for 19 December, was rearranged for 16 March.

On 25 January, University of Colorado's women's soccer program, Colorado Buffaloes, announced that Leila Lister would be joining them as a student-athlete.

On 2 February, Reading's match against Arsenal scheduled for 16 January, was rearranged for 2 March.

On 8 February, Reading confirmed that Brooke Chaplen had been ruled out for an indefinite amount of time after a bone tumour had been found in her right leg. On 28 April, Chaplen announced her retirement from football as a result of the successful operation on her right leg.

On 3 May, Reading announced that captain Natasha Harding would be leaving the club at the end of the season.

== Squad ==
As of match played 8 May 2022

No.	Name	Nationality	Position	Date of birth (age)	Signed from	Signed in	Contract ends	Apps.	Goals
Goalkeepers
1	Grace Moloney	(Republic of Ireland)	GK	1 March 1993 (aged 29)	Academy	2009	2023	207	0
21	Rhiannon Stewart	(England)	GK		Academy	2019		5	0
41	Hannah Poulter	(England)	GK	26 April 2005 (aged 17)	Academy	2021		0	0
Defenders
2	Faye Bryson	(England)	DF	4 July 1997 (aged 24)	Bristol City	2021	2023	24	1
3	Emma Mitchell	(Scotland)	DF	19 September 1992 (aged 29)	Arsenal	2020		17	0
5	Gemma Evans	(Wales)	DF	1 August 1996 (aged 25)	Bristol City	2021	2023	27	1
14	Deanna Cooper	(England)	DF	20 June 1993 (aged 28)	Chelsea	2020		43	0
28	Lily Woodham	(Wales)	DF	3 September 2000 (aged 21)	Bristol City	2018		47	0
31	Bethan Roberts	(Wales)	DF	14 May 2003 (aged 18)	Academy	2019	2023	14	0
32	Jemma Woodcock	(England)	DF		Academy	2021		0	0
35	Sophie Baigent	(England)	DF		Academy	2021		0	0
Midfielders
4	Chloe Peplow	(England)	MF	3 December 1998 (aged 23)	Tottenham Hotspur	2021		16	0
6	Deanne Rose	(Canada)	MF	3 March 1999 (aged 23)	Florida Gators	2021	2023	26	5
11	Natasha Harding (captain)	(Wales)	MF	2 March 1989 (aged 33)	Liverpool	2017		104	7
23	Rachel Rowe	(Wales)	MF	13 September 1992 (aged 29)	Swansea City	2015	2024	132	15
27	Justine Vanhaevermaet	(Belgium)	MF	29 April 1992 (aged 30)	LSK Kvinner	2021	2023	24	3
33	Leila Lister	(Scotland)	MF	18 January 2004 (aged 18)	Academy	2021		1	0
34	Ella Wild	(England)	MF		Academy	2021		0	0
36	Taylor MacDonald	(England)	MF		Academy	2021		0	0
37	Tia Primmer	(England)	MF	2 May 2004 (aged 18)	Academy	2021		14	2
38	Freya Meadows-Tuson	(England)	MF		Academy	2021		0	0
39	Anne Thomann	(England)	MF		Academy	2021		0	0
40	Lois Joslyn	(England)	MF		Academy	2021		0	0
51	Sanne Troelsgaard	(Denmark)	MF	15 August 1988 (aged 33)	Rosengård	2021	2023	15	0
Forwards
9	Amalie Eikeland	(Norway)	FW	26 August 1995 (aged 26)	Sandviken	2019	2022	72	7
10	Natasha Dowie	(England)	FW	30 June 1988 (aged 33)	A.C. Milan	2021		22	7
12	Emma Harries	(England)	FW	29 March 2002 (aged 20)	Academy	2020		44	4
Out on loan
Left during the season
7	Jeon Ga-eul	(South Korea)	FW	14 September 1988 (aged 33)	Bristol City	2020	2022	8	0
19	Brooke Chaplen	(England)	MF	16 April 1989 (aged 33)	Sunderland	2017	2022	95	33

== Transfers ==
=== In ===
Date	Position	Nationality	Name	From	Fee	Ref.
28 June 2021	FW	(England)	Natasha Dowie	AC Milan	Undisclosed	
28 July 2021	DF	(Wales)	Gemma Evans	Bristol City	Free	
28 July 2021	DF	(England)	Faye Bryson	Bristol City	Free	
28 July 2021	MF	(England)	Chloe Peplow	Tottenham Hotspur	Free	
28 July 2021	MF	(Canada)	Deanne Rose	Florida Gators	Free	
17 August 2021	MF	(Belgium)	Justine Vanhaevermaet	LSK Kvinner	Undisclosed	
21 December 2021	MF	(Denmark)	Sanne Troelsgaard Nielsen	Rosengård	Free	

=== Out ===
Date	Position	Nationality	Name	To	Fee	Ref.
30 July 2021	DF	(England)	Kiera Skeels	Charlton Athletic	Undisclosed	
30 July 2021	MF	(England)	Sophie Quirk	Charlton Athletic	Undisclosed	

=== Released ===
Date	Position	Nationality	Name	Joined	Date	Ref.
27 December 2021	FW	(South Korea)	Jeon Ga-eul	Sejong Sportstoto		
28 April 2022	MF	(England)	Brooke Chaplen	Retired		
31 May 2022	GK	(England)	Rhiannon Stewart	Harvard Crimson		
31 May 2022	DF	(England)	Jemma Woodcock			
31 May 2022	MF	(England)	Lois Joslyn	Oxford United	16 August 2022	
31 May 2022	MF	(England)	Taylor MacDonald	Portsmouth	5 August 2022	
31 May 2022	MF	(England)	Ella Wild	Portsmouth	10 August 2022	
31 May 2022	MF	(Scotland)	Leila Lister	Colorado Buffaloes		
31 May 2022	MF	(Wales)	Natasha Harding	Aston Villa	12 July 2022	

== Competitions ==
=== Overview ===
Competition	First match	Last match	Starting round	Final position	Record							
Competition	First match	Last match	Starting round	Final position	Pld	W	D	L	GF	GA	GD	Win %
WSL	5 September 2021	8 May 2022	Matchday 1	8th	22	7	4	11	21	40	−19	31.82
FA Cup	30 January 2022	27 February 2022	Fourth round	Fifth Round	2	1	0	1	3	2	+1	50.00
EFL Cup	13 October 2021	15 December 2021	Group Stage	Group Stage	3	1	1	1	4	3	+1	33.33
Total					27	9	5	13	28	45	−17	33.33

Last updated: 8 May 2022
Source: Competitions

=== WSL ===
==== Results summary ====
Overall								Home						Away					
Pld	W	D	L	GF	GA	GD	Pts	W	D	L	GF	GA	GD	W	D	L	GF	GA	GD
22	7	4	11	21	40	−19	25	5	1	5	12	18	−6	2	3	6	9	22	−13

Last updated: 8 May 2022.
Source: FA WSL

==== Results by matchday ====
Matchday	1	2	3	4	5	6	7	8	9	10	11	12	13	14	15	16	17	18	19	20	21	22
Ground	A	H	A	H	H	A	A	H	H	H (Note: matchday 11)	H (Note: matchday 13)	A (Note: matchday 14)	A (Note: matchday 15)	A (Note: matchday 12)	A (Note: matchday 16)	H (Note: matchday 17)	A (Note: matchday 10)	A	A	H	A	H
Result	L	L	L	L	W	W	D	W	W	W	W	W	L	L	D	L	L	D	L	L	D	L
Position	11	11	11	12	10	9	8	8	8	6	6	5	6	6	6	7	7	8	8	8	8	8

Updated to match(es) played on 8 May 2022. Source: Results
A = Away; H = Home; W = Win; D = Draw; L = Loss; P = Postponed

==== Results ====
5 September 2021 1	Manchester United	2–0	Reading	Leigh
19:45 BST (UTC+1)	Staniforth (yellow card) 35'; Hanson 39'; Batlle 54'	Report		Stadium: Leigh Sports Village; Attendance: 2,111; Referee: Abigail Byrne

12 September 2021 2	Reading	0–4	Arsenal	Reading
14:00 BST (UTC+1)	Rowe (yellow card) 23'	Report	Beattie 17'; Mead 30'; Miedema 32', 50'; McCabe (yellow card) 84'	Stadium: Select Car Leasing Stadium; Attendance: 1,127; Referee: Emily Heaslip

26 September 2021 3	Tottenham Hotspur	1–0	Reading	Edgware
14:00 BST (UTC+1)	Ubogagu (yellow card) 38'; Ale (yellow card) 73'; Naz 85'	Report	Moloney (yellow card) 80'	Stadium: The Hive Stadium; Attendance: 2,111; Referee: Amy Fearns

3 October 2021 4	Reading	0–3	Everton	Reading
14:00 BST (UTC+1)	Woodham (yellow card) 90+1'	Report	Anvegård 2'; Emslie 38'; Turner 45+9'; Christiansen (penalty missed) 76'	Stadium: Select Car Leasing Stadium; Attendance: 740; Referee: Lucy May

10 October 2021 5	Reading	3–0	Aston Villa	Reading
14:00 BST (UTC+1)	Eikeland 16'; Rowe 19'; Dowie 45+3'; Vanhaevermaet (yellow card) 73'	Report		Stadium: Select Car Leasing Stadium; Attendance: 578; Referee: Louise Saunders

7 November 2021 6	Birmingham City	0–3	Reading	Birmingham
14:00 GMT (UTC)	Robertson (yellow card) 76'	Report	Harding (yellow card) 43'; Dowie 47'; Rose 54', 71' (yellow card) 64'	Stadium: St Andrew's; Attendance: 298; Referee: Louise Saunders

14 November 2021 7	West Ham United	2–2	Reading	Dagenham
14:00 GMT (UTC)	Evans 19'; Fisk 35'; Walker (yellow card) 59'	Report	Harding (yellow card) 32'; Chaplen (yellow card) 58'; Bryson (yellow card) 68'; Stringer 70' (o.g.); Harries 90+2'	Stadium: Victoria Road; Attendance: 1,496; Referee: Emily Heaslip

21 November 2021 8	Reading	2–0	Brighton & Hove Albion	Reading
14:00 GMT (UTC)	Dowie 3'; Harries 86'	Report		Stadium: Select Car Leasing Stadium; Attendance: 733; Referee: Helen Conley

11 December 2021 9	Reading	1–0	Chelsea	Reading
11:30 GMT (UTC)	Rose 4'; Eikeland (yellow card) 28'	Report		Stadium: Select Car Leasing Stadium; Attendance: 742; Referee: Louise Saunders

9 January 2022 11	Reading	1–0	Leicester City	Reading
14:00 GMT (UTC)	Dowie 11' (penalty missed) 30'	Report	Purfield (yellow card) 36'; Tierney (yellow card) 72'	Stadium: Select Car Leasing Stadium; Attendance: 501; Referee: Louise Saunders

23 January 2022 13	Reading	3–2	Birmingham City	Reading
14:00 GMT (UTC)	Vanhaevermaet 45+4'; Dowie 48' (pen.); Harries 55'	Report	Lawley 3'; Pennock 36'	Stadium: Select Car Leasing Stadium; Attendance: 552; Referee: Lisa Benn

6 February 2022 14	Everton	1–2	Reading	Liverpool
13:00 GMT (UTC)	Anvegård 5'; Turner (yellow card) 8'; Christiansen (penalty missed) 53'	Report	Dowie 74'; Primmer (yellow card) 84' (goal) 87'	Stadium: Walton Hall Park; Attendance: 242; Referee: Andrew Kitchen

13 February 2022 15	Brighton & Hove Albion	4–1	Reading	Crawley
14:00 GMT (UTC)	Green 20', 52', 61' (yellow card) 22'; Koivisto 68'; Le Tissier (yellow card) 72'	Report	Woodham (yellow card) 33'; Eikeland 88'	Stadium: Broadfield Stadium; Attendance: 1,159; Referee: Carl Brook

2 March 2022 12	Arsenal	4–0	Reading	Borehamwood
19:15 GMT (UTC)	Miedema 22'; McCabe 24'; Williamson 34'; Blackstenius 72'	Report		Stadium: Meadow Park; Attendance: 1,554; Referee: James Bell
Note: Match originally scheduled for 16 January, but postponed on 15 January due to COVID-19, and rearranged on 2 February.

6 March 2022 16	Reading	0–0	Tottenham Hotspur	Reading
14:00 GMT (UTC)		Report	Percival (yellow card) 18'; Bartrip (yellow card) 75'; Summanen (yellow card) 79'; Clemaron (yellow card) 86'	Stadium: Select Car Leasing Stadium; Attendance: 960; Referee: Lauren Impey

12 March 2022 17	Reading	1–3	Manchester United	Reading
11:30 GMT (UTC)	Rose 16'; Troelsgaard (yellow card) 59'	Report	Galton 5', 25'; Batlle (yellow card) 24'; Russo 43'	Stadium: Select Car Leasing Stadium; Attendance: 1,371; Referee: Lucy May

16 March 2022 10	Manchester City	2–0	Reading	Manchester
19:00 GMT (UTC)	Stokes 73'; Hemp 84'	Report	Vanhaevermaet (yellow card) 81'	Stadium: Academy Stadium; Attendance: 1,126; Referee: Anthony Backhouse
Note: Match originally scheduled for 19 December, postponed on 17 December due to COVID-19, and rearranged on 24 January.

26 March 2022 18	Aston Villa	1–1	Reading	Walsall
12:30 GMT (UTC)	Petzelberger 76'; Corsie (yellow card) 89'	Report	Vanhaevermaet 69' (pen.)	Stadium: Bescot Stadium; Attendance: 461; Referee: Lauren Impey

3 April 2022 19	Chelsea	5–0	Reading	Kingston upon Thames
18:45 BST (UTC+1)	Fleming 40'; England 52', 90+2' (pen.); Kerr 66', 77'	Report		Stadium: Kingsmeadow; Attendance: 2,485; Referee: Emily Heaslip

24 April 2022 20	Reading	1–2	West Ham United	Reading
14:00 BST (UTC+1)	Harding (yellow card) 12'; Bryson (yellow card) 41' (goal) 90+5'	Report	Snerle 46'; Hasegawa 86'	Stadium: Select Car Leasing Stadium; Attendance: 600; Referee: Tom Reeves

1 May 2022 21	Leicester City	0–0	Reading	Leicester
14:00 BST (UTC+1)		Report	Troelsgaard (yellow card) 41'	Stadium: King Power Stadium; Attendance: 2,244; Referee: Richie Watkins

8 May 2022 22	Reading	0–4	Manchester City	Reading
12:00 BST (UTC+1)	Woodham (yellow card) 90'; Primmer (yellow card) 90+2'	Report	Hemp 33'; Shaw 40'; White 85'; Greenwood 90+1' (pen.)	Stadium: Select Car Leasing Stadium; Attendance: 1,200; Referee: Elizabeth Simms

==== Table ====
Pos	Team	Pld	W	D	L	GF	GA	GD	Pts
6	West Ham United	22	7	6	9	23	33	−10	27
7	Brighton & Hove Albion	22	8	2	12	24	38	−14	26
8	Reading	22	7	4	11	21	40	−19	25
9	Aston Villa	22	6	3	13	13	40	−27	21
10	Everton	22	5	5	12	18	41	−23	20

Source: FA WSL
Rules for classification: 1) Points; 2) Goal difference; 3) Number of goals scored.

=== FA Cup ===
30 January 2022 Fourth Round	Brighton & Hove Albion	2–3	Reading	Crawley
13:00 GMT (UTC)	Koivisto 64'; Green 76'; Le Tissier (yellow card) 81'	Report	Vanhaevermaet 34'; Rose 51'; Troelsgaard (yellow card) 62'; Bryson (yellow card) 78'; Primmer 83'	Stadium: Broadfield Stadium; Attendance: 631; Referee: Lucy May

27 February 2022 Fifth Round	Reading	0–1 (a.e.t.)	West Ham United	Reading
14:00 GMT (UTC)	Bryson (yellow card) 86'	Report	Arnold (yellow card) 42'; Fisk (yellow card) 49'; Brynjarsdóttir 105+1'; Walker (yellow card) 117'; Parker (yellow card) 119'	Stadium: Select Car Leasing Stadium

=== League Cup ===
==== Group stage ====
13 October 2021 1	Reading	0–1	Bristol City	Reading
19:30 BST (UTC+1)		Report	L.Cataldo (yellow card) 62'; Harrison 90+2'	Stadium: Select Car Leasing Stadium; Referee: Stacey Pearson

17 November 2021 2	Crystal Palace	1–3	Reading	Bromley
19:30 GMT (UTC)	M.Sharpe 51'	Report	Evans 34'; Chaplen 73', 76'	Stadium: Hayes Lane; Referee: Louise Saunders

15 December 2021 3	Lewes	1–1 (a.e.t.) (6 – 5 p)	Reading	Lewes
19:30 GMT (UTC)	Cleverly 10'; Hack (yellow card) 54'	Report	Moloney (yellow card) 10'; Dowie 17'; Eikeland (yellow card) 83'	Stadium: The Dripping Pan; Referee: Abigail Byrne
	Penalties
	Dalton (penalty scored); Logan (penalty missed); Timms (penalty scored); Miller (penalty scored); Noble (penalty scored); Ashworth-Clifford (penalty scored); Cousins (penalty missed); Hack (penalty scored)		(penalty missed) Peplow; (penalty scored) Dowie; (penalty scored) Harries; (penalty scored) Vanhaevermaet; (penalty scored) Woodham; (penalty scored) Eikeland; (penalty missed) Primmer; (penalty missed) Lister

Pos	Team	Pld	W	WPEN	LPEN	L	GF	GA	GD	Pts	Qualification	BRI	REA	CRY	LEW
1	Bristol City	3	2	1	0	0	4	1	+3	8	Advances to knock-out stage	—	—	—	3–1
2	Reading	3	1	0	1	1	4	3	+1	4	Possible knock-out stage based on ranking	0–1	—	—	—
3	Crystal Palace	3	0	1	1	1	2	4	−2	3		0–0	1–3	—	—
4	Lewes	3	0	1	1	1	3	5	−2	3		—	1—1	1–1	—

Source: thefa.com
Rules for classification: 1) Points; 2) Goal difference; 3) Number of goals scored; 4) Number of wins; 5) Head-to-head record

Pos	Grp	Team	Pld	W	WPEN	LPEN	L	GF	GA	GD	Pts	PPG	Qualification
1	B	Manchester United	4	2	1	1	0	8	5	+3	9	2.25	Advances to knock-out stage
2	C	Charlton Athletic	3	2	0	0	1	8	2	+6	6	2.00	
3	A	Sunderland	4	1	2	0	1	3	9	−6	7	1.75	
4	E	London City Lionesses	3	1	1	0	1	3	3	0	5	1.67	
5	D	Reading	3	1	0	1	1	4	3	+1	4	1.33	

Source: thefa.com

== Squad statistics ==
As of match played 8 May 2022

=== Appearances ===
No.	Pos	Nat	Player	Total		WSL		FA Cup		League Cup	
No.	Pos	Nat	Player	Apps	Goals	Apps	Goals	Apps	Goals	Apps	Goals
1	GK	(Republic of Ireland) IRL	Grace Moloney	23	0	20	0	0	0	3	0
2	DF	(England) ENG	Faye Bryson	24	1	20	1	2	0	2	0
4	MF	(England) ENG	Chloe Peplow	16	0	8+5	0	0	0	1+2	0
5	DF	(Wales) WAL	Gemma Evans	27	1	22	0	2	0	3	1
6	MF	(Canada) CAN	Deanne Rose	26	5	19+2	4	2	1	1+2	0
9	FW	(Norway) NOR	Amalie Eikeland	25	2	19+1	2	2	0	3	0
10	FW	(England) ENG	Natasha Dowie	22	7	16+1	6	2	0	3	1
11	MF	(Wales) WAL	Natasha Harding	26	0	21+1	0	2	0	2	0
12	FW	(England) ENG	Emma Harries	24	3	12+7	3	2	0	2+1	0
14	DF	(England) ENG	Deanna Cooper	19	0	16+1	0	1	0	1	0
21	GK	(England) ENG	Rhiannon Stewart	5	0	2+1	0	2	0	0	0
23	MF	(Wales) WAL	Rachel Rowe	16	1	9+5	1	0+1	0	1	0
27	MF	(Belgium) BEL	Justine Vanhaevermaet	24	3	17+2	2	1+1	1	3	0
28	DF	(Wales) WAL	Lily Woodham	26	0	20+1	0	1+1	0	3	0
31	DF	(Wales) WAL	Bethan Roberts	7	0	0+4	0	1	0	2	0
33	MF	(Scotland) SCO	Leila Lister	1	0	0	0	0	0	0+1	0
37	MF	(England) ENG	Tia Primmer	14	2	3+7	1	0+2	1	2	0
51	MF	(Denmark) DEN	Sanne Troelsgaard	15	0	10+3	0	2	0	0	0
Players away from the club on loan:
Players who appeared for Reading but left during the season:
7	FW	(South Korea) KOR	Jeon Ga-eul	2	0	0+2	0	0	0	0	0
19	MF	(England) ENG	Brooke Chaplen	10	2	8	0	0	0	1+1	2

=== Goal scorers ===
Place	Position	Nation	Number	Name	WSL	FA Cup	League Cup	Total
1	FW	(England)	10	Natasha Dowie	6	0	1	7
2	MF	(Canada)	6	Deanne Rose	4	1	0	5
3	FW	(England)	12	Emma Harries	3	0	0	3
3	MF	(Belgium)	27	Justine Vanhaevermaet	2	1	0	3
5	FW	(Norway)	9	Amalie Eikeland	2	0	0	2
5	MF	(England)	37	Tia Primmer	1	1	0	2
5	FW	(England)	19	Brooke Chaplen	0	0	2	2
8	MF	(Wales)	23	Rachel Rowe	1	0	0	1
8	DF	(England)	2	Faye Bryson	1	0	0	1
8	DF	(Wales)	5	Gemma Evans	0	0	1	1
8				Own goal	1	0	0	1
Total					21	3	4	28

=== Clean sheets ===
Place	Position	Nation	Number	Name	WSL	FA Cup	League Cup	Total
1	GK	(Republic of Ireland)	1	Grace Moloney	7	0	1	8
Total					7	0	1	8

=== Disciplinary record ===
Number	Nation	Position	Name	WSL		FA Cup		League Cup		Total	
Number	Nation	Position	Name	Booked	Sent off (straight red)	Booked	Sent off (straight red)	Booked	Sent off (straight red)	Booked	Sent off (straight red)
1	(Republic of Ireland)	GK	Grace Moloney	1	0	0	0	1	0	2	0
2	(England)	DF	Faye Bryson	2	0	2	0	0	0	4	0
6	(Canada)	MF	Deanne Rose	1	0	0	0	0	0	1	0
9	(Norway)	FW	Amalie Eikeland	1	0	0	0	1	0	2	0
11	(Wales)	MF	Natasha Harding	3	0	0	0	0	0	3	0
23	(Wales)	MF	Rachel Rowe	1	0	0	0	0	0	1	0
27	(Belgium)	MF	Justine Vanhaevermaet	2	0	0	0	0	0	2	0
28	(Wales)	DF	Lily Woodham	3	0	0	0	0	0	3	0
37	(England)	MF	Tia Primmer	2	0	0	0	0	0	2	0
51	(Denmark)	MF	Sanne Troelsgaard	2	0	1	0	0	0	3	0
Players away on loan:
Players who left Reading during the season:
19	(England)	MF	Brooke Chaplen	1	0	0	0	0	0	1	0
Total				19	0	3	0	2	0	24	0
