= Kirsty Linnett =

English footballer

Personal information
- Full name: Kirsty Ann Linnett
- Date of birth: 24 September 1993 (age 33)
- Position: Forward

Youth career
- 2003–2009: Leicester City
- 2010–2012: Arsenal

Senior career*
| Years | Team | Apps | (Gls) |
| 2012–2017 | Birmingham City | 44 | (25) |
| 2017 | Notts County | 0 | (0) |
| 2017–2018 | Reading | 19 | (6) |
| 2018–2021 | Liverpool | 39 | (10) |
| Total | | 102 | (41) |

International career
| | England U17 | 10 | (2) |
| | England U20 | 2 | (0) |
| | England U23 | 6 | (0) |
- * Club domestic league appearances and goals

Kirsty Ann Linnett (born 24 September 1993) is an English former professional footballer who last played as a forward for Liverpool. Linnett also played for Birmingham City, Notts County and Reading at club level, and she represented England on the U-15, U-17, U-19, and U-23 national teams.

== Club career ==
A Leicester native, Linnett joined local grassroots club Leicester City at the age of ten. She left for Arsenal at the age of 16, but two successive knee injuries kept her out of action for two years. A move to Birmingham City went through in December 2012, where she remained for four seasons and got her first taste of UEFA Women's Champions League action.

In January 2017, Linnett moved on to Notts County on a three-year deal. Less than three months later, however, the club folded before the FA WSL Spring Series. Becoming a free agent without playing in a single league match for Notts County, Linnett joined Reading along with teammates Jade Moore and Jo Potter in May 2017.

On 11 August 2018, she joined Liverpool. On 21 May 2021, Linnett announced that the club would not offer her a new contract. Linnett criticised the club on social media after they withdrew a contract offer after offering one to her. She subsequently retired from playing and joined a sports agency.

== International career ==
An England youth international, Linnett represented her country at the U-15, U-17, U-19, and U-23 levels.

== Personal life ==
As of October 2018, Linnett was in a relationship with Chris Wood who is also a professional footballer.
