= Sophie O'Rourke =

English footballer

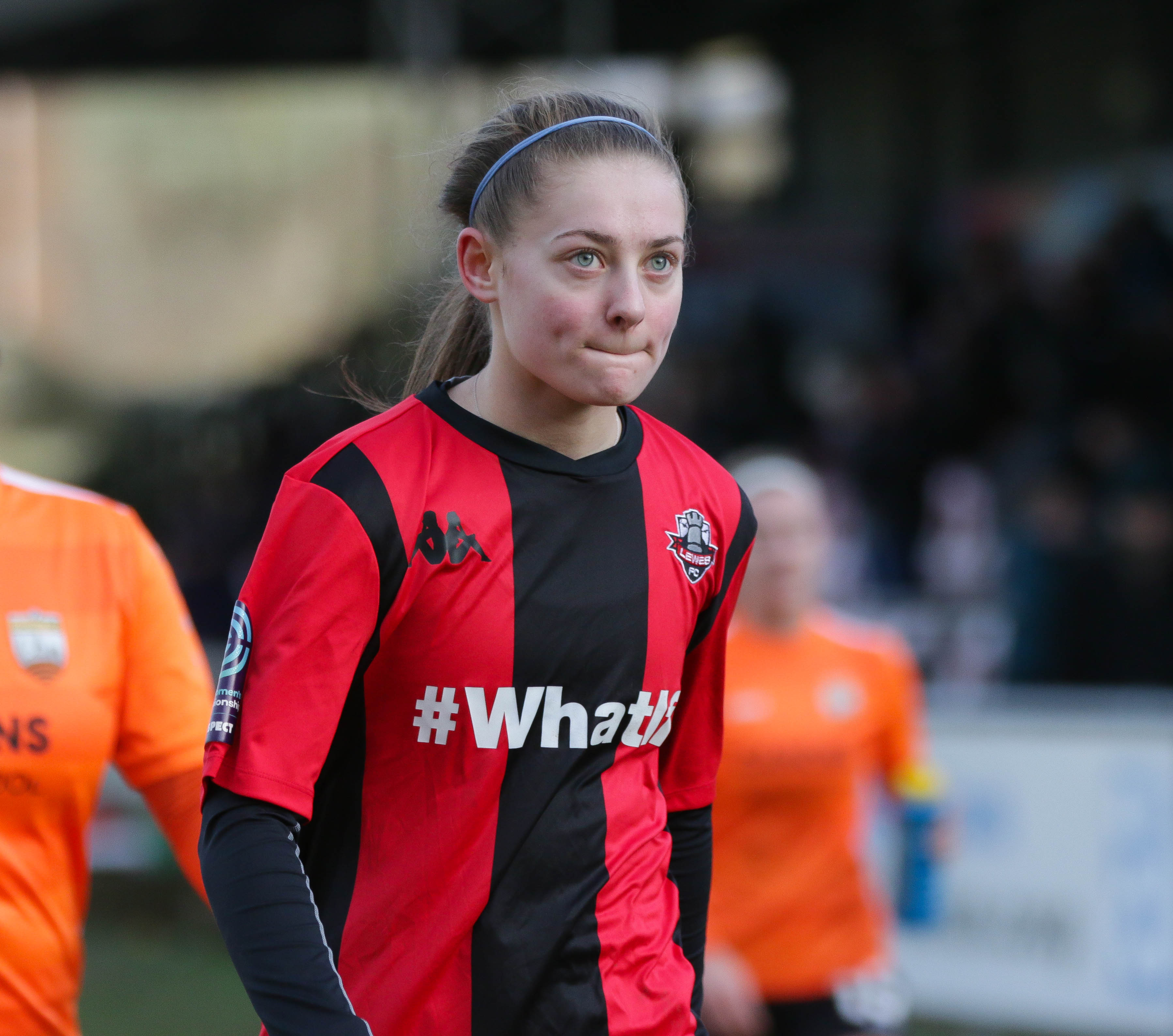
- O'Rourke with Lewes in 2019

Personal information
- Date of birth: 3 June 1999 (age 27)
- Place of birth: Reading, Berkshire, England
- Position: Defender

Team information
- Current team: Sheffield United
- Number: 20

Senior career*
Years	Team	Apps	(Gls)
2017-2018	Reading	0	(0)
2018	Grindavik	6	(0)
2018-2022	Lewes	59	(0)
2022-2025	Charlton Athletic	40	(0)
2025–	Sheffield United	14	(0)
- * Club domestic league appearances and goals as of 1 February 2026

Sophie O'Rourke (born 3 June 1999) is an English footballer who plays as a defender for Women's Super League 2 club Sheffield United. She has previously played for Reading, Grindavik, Lewes, and Charlton Athletic.

== Club career ==
O'Rourke had played for Lewes but in 2022 she was among the five players who joined Charlton. The others were Angela Addison, Freda Ayisi, Corinne Henson and Emily Simpkins. It was a free transfer for (at the time) one year. On 6 July 2023, it was announced that O'Rourke had signed a new two-year contract to extend her time at Charlton. On 1 June 2023, it was announced that O'Rourke would be departing the club upon the expiry of her contract at the end of the 2024-25 season.

Having played in every season of the league since its 2018 restructure, O'Rourke signed with Women's Super League 2 club Sheffield United on 24 July 2025.

== Career statistics ==
=== Club ===
As of match played 1 February 2026

Appearances and goals by club, season and competition
Club	Season	League			FA Cup		League Cup		Total	
Club	Season	Division	Apps	Goals	Apps	Goals	Apps	Goals	Apps	Goals
UMF Grindavik	2018	Besta Deild Kvenna	6	0	0	0	0	0	6	0
Lewes WFC	2018–19	Women's Championship	11	0	0	0	1	0	12	0
Lewes WFC	2019–20	Women's Championship	9	0	0	0	3	0	12	0
Lewes WFC	2020–21	Women's Championship	20	0	0	0	2	0	22	0
Lewes WFC	2021–22	Women's Championship	19	0	0	0	2	0	21	0
Lewes WFC	Total		59	0	0	0	8	0	67	0
Charlton Athletic	2022–23	Women's Championship	17	0	2	0	3	0	22	0
Charlton Athletic	2023–24	Women's Championship	10	0	2	0	3	0	15	0
Charlton Athletic	2024–25	Women's Championship	13	0	1	0	1	0	15	0
Charlton Athletic	Total		40	0	5	0	7	0	52	0
Sheffield United	2025–26	WSL 2	14	0	2	0	3	0	19	0
Career total			119	0	7	0	18	0	144	0
