= Remi Allen =

Assistant Coach Crystal Palace FC Women

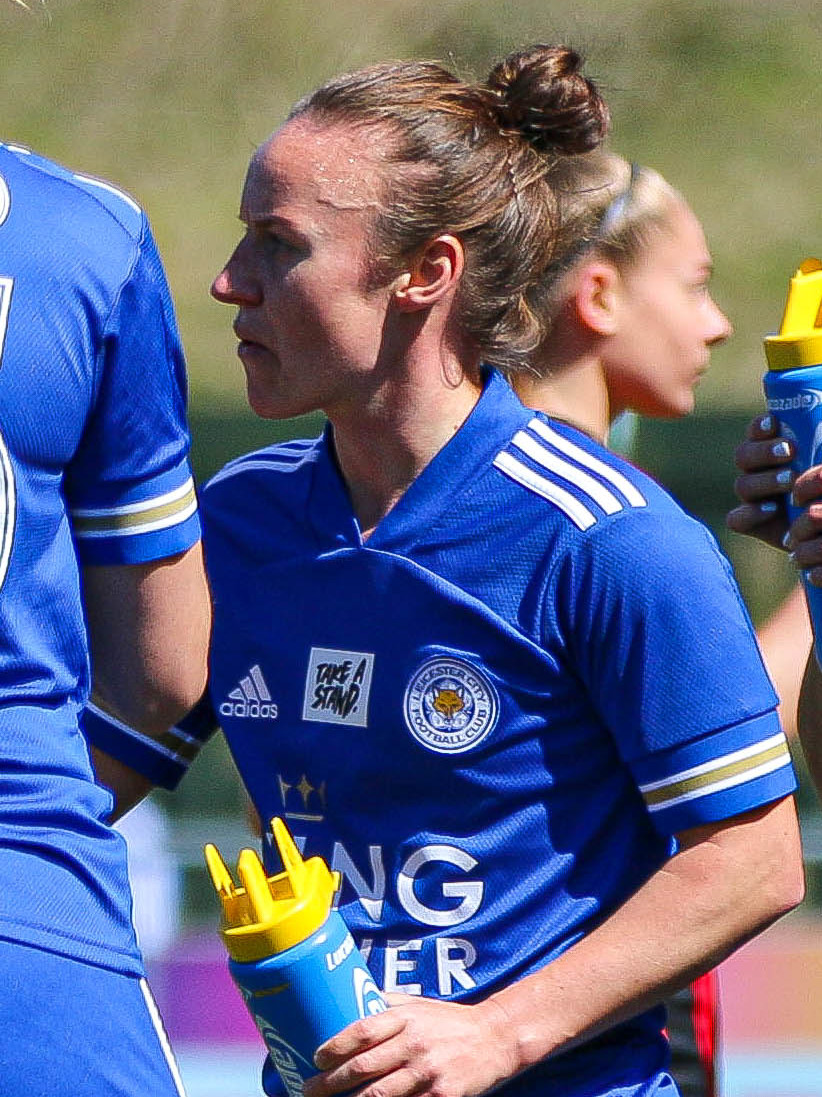
- Allen in 2021 with Leicester City

Personal information
- Full name: Remi Lee Allen
- Date of birth: 15 October 1990 (age 36)
- Place of birth: Leicester, England
- Position: Midfielder

Senior career*
Years	Team	Apps	(Gls)
2008–2009	Leicester City	14	(6)
2009–2010	Leeds Carnegie	9	(2)
2011–2013	Notts County (Lincoln Ladies)	35	(5)
2014–2016	Birmingham City	34	(1)
2016–2020	Reading	66	(14)
2020–2021	Leicester City	18	(5)
2021–2023	Aston Villa	22	(3)
2023–2024	Birmingham City	10	(2)

International career
2008–2009	England U19	15	(1)
2010–2013	England U23	11	(0)

Managerial career
- 2024: London City Lionesses
- 2024–2025: Southampton
- 2025–: Crystal Palace
- * Club domestic league appearances and goals as of 31 May 2023

Remi Lee Allen (born 15 October 1990) is an English professional football coach and former player who serves as assistant coach at Crystal Palace and was formerly the head coach of Women's Championship club Southampton.

== Club career ==
On 30 June 2016, Reading signed Allen from Birmingham City for an undisclosed fee. On 8 June 2020, Reading announced that Allen had left the club after her contract had expired.

On 22 August 2020, Leicester City announced their signing of Allen ahead of the 2020–21 season, among seven other FA WSL players, as they embarked on their journey as a fully professional club.

Allen signed as a free agent with Aston Villa on 1 July 2021. She was given the captaincy ahead of the 2021–22 season. On her debut, she scored the winning goal in a 2–1 victory against her former club, Leicester. Allen ruptured her ACL in a 0–0 draw with Manchester United on 24 April 2022. After 13 months, Allen returned from injury in a match against Reading.

On 23 July 2023, Birmingham City announced the signing of Allen on a free transfer.

== International career ==
On 5 May 2014, Allen was called up to the England team for the first time. Allen ruptured her ACL playing for England when she was 18.

== Coaching career ==
While still playing at Birmingham City in the 2023–24 season, Allen joined the England women's under-23s as an assistant coach.

On 2 March 2024, London City Lionesses announced the appointment of Allen as head coach until the end of the season. She joined following the termination of her playing contract by mutual consent with Birmingham City. Allen was named the league's Manager of the Month for March 2024 after the Lionesses won their first three matches with her in charge. On 9 May 2024, Allen departed as head coach at the expiration of her contract.

On 12 July 2024, Allen was named head coach of Southampton. On 28 February 2025, Allen left the club by mutual consent.

On 15 July 2025, it was announced that Allen had been appointed as the assistant coach at Women's Super League 2 side Crystal Palace, joining the coaching staff of her former teammate Jo Potter.

== Personal life ==
Allen is colour blind. On 13 June 2024, Allen married Nottingham Forest Women F.C. manager Carly Davies in Dénia, Spain.

== Honours ==
Individual

- Women's Championship Manager of the Month: March 2024
