= Mandy van den Berg =

Dutch footballer (born 1990)

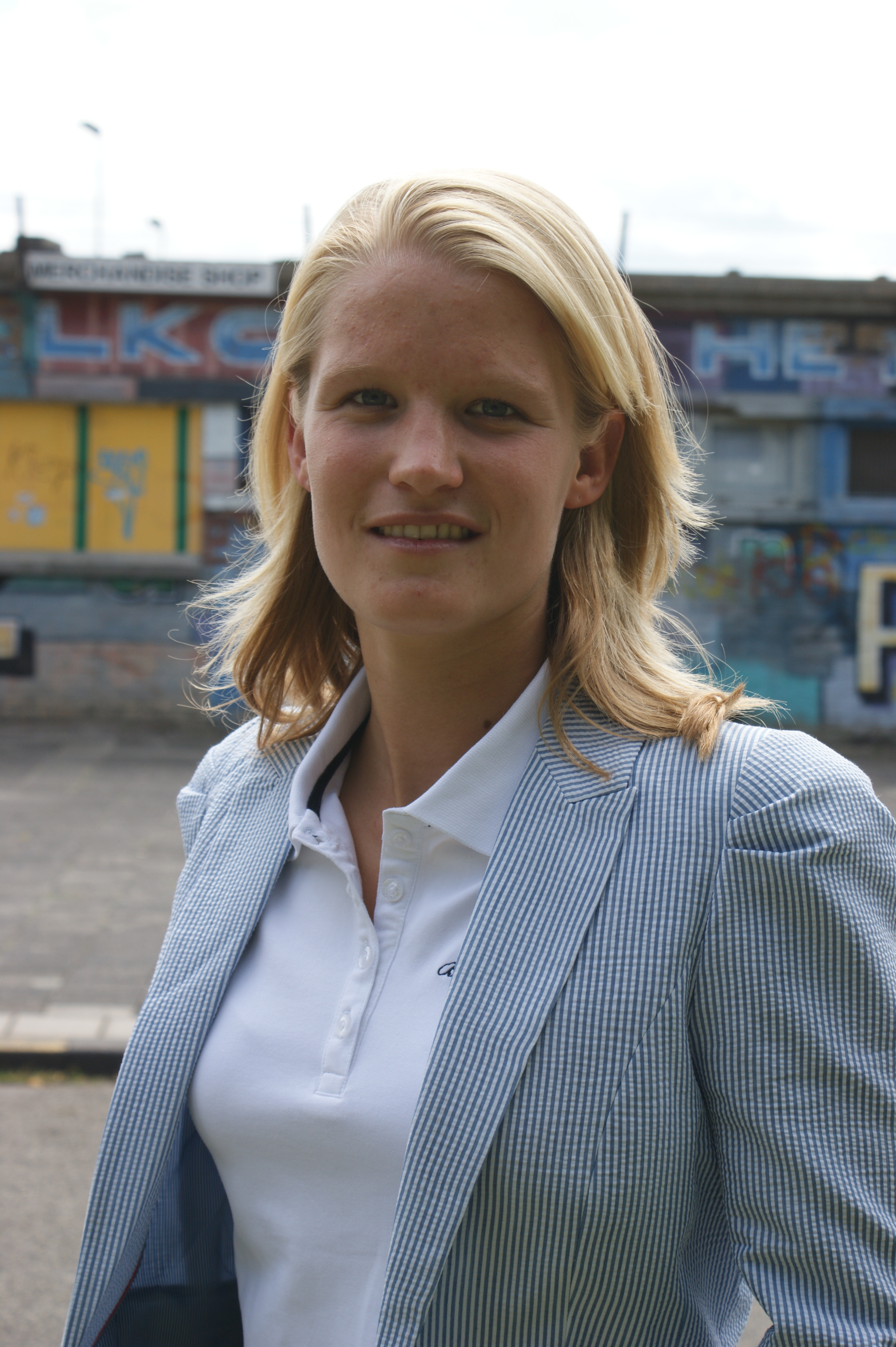

Personal information
- Full name: Mandy van den Berg
- Date of birth: 26 August 1990 (age 36)
- Place of birth: Naaldwijk, Netherlands
- Height: 1.65 m (5 ft 5 in)
- Position: Defender

Youth career
- Westlandia

Senior career*
Years	Team	Apps	(Gls)
2007–2012	ADO Den Haag	57	(7)
2012–2014	Vittsjö GIK	47	(3)
2015	LSK Kvinner FK	11	(0)
2016	Liverpool	10	(0)
2016–2017	Reading	6	(1)
2018–2020	Valencia	40	(1)
2020–2023	PSV	45	(2)

International career^{‡}
2010–2017	Netherlands	90	(6)
Medal record
Women's football
Representing the Netherlands
UEFA Women's Championship
Gold medal – first place	2017 Netherlands	Team
- * Club domestic league appearances and goals as of 02:26, 15 May 2024 (UTC) ‡ National team caps and goals as of 15 December 2017

Mandy van den Berg-Carreras (Dutch pronunciation: [ˈmɛndi vɑn də(m) ˈbɛr(ə)x]; born 26 August 1990) is a Dutch former footballer who played as a defender and for the Netherlands women's national team. She formerly played club football in the Eredivisie Vrouwen for ADO Den Haag, for Vittsjö GIK of the Swedish Damallsvenskan and for LSK Kvinner FK of the Norwegian Toppserien.

== Club career ==
=== Vittsjö ===
Van den Berg made her league debut against Tyresö on 20 August 2012. She scored her first league goal against Mallbackens on 6 June 2013, scoring in the 34th minute.

=== Kvinner ===
After spending three seasons in Sweden with Vittsjö, Van den Berg signed for LSK Kvinner of Lillestrøm, Norway in December 2014. She made her league debut against Lillestrøm on 29 March 2015. LSK Kvinner secured a double in 2015.

=== Liverpool ===
Van den Berg left after one season to join English FA WSL club Liverpool. She made her league debut against Birmingham City on 23 March 2016. Van den Berg played 12 times for Liverpool, who finished fifth in WSL 1.

=== Reading ===
Van den Berg transferred to Reading at the end of the season from Liverpool. She made her league debut against Manchester City on 7 May 2017. Van den Berg scored her first league goal against Yeovil Town on 17 May 2017, scoring in the 8th minute.

=== Valencia ===
Van den Berg was announced at Valencia on 8 January 2018. She made her league debut against Santa Teresa on 28 January 2018. She scored her first league goal against Espanyol on 16 September 2018, scoring in the 63rd minute. On 14 June 2019, it was announced that she had extended her contract until 30 June 2020.

=== PSV ===
Van den Berg was announced at PSV on 3 June 2020. She made her league debut against Heerenveen on 13 September 2020. Van den Berg scored her first league goal against Ajax on 7 November 2021, scoring in the 72nd minute. On 27 May 2022, it was announced she had extended her contract until 2023, for one more season.

On 5 May 2023, Van den Berg announced her retirement.

== International career ==
Van den Berg began playing football aged six and was called up for the Netherlands Under-17 team while still at school in her native Naaldwijk. After winning 22 caps at Under-19 level, Van den Berg debuted for the senior Netherlands women's national football team on 15 December 2010. She replaced captain Daphne Koster for the second half of a 3–1 win over Mexico during a friendly tournament in Brazil.

National team coach Roger Reijners named Van den Berg in his final squad for UEFA Women's Euro 2013 in Sweden. When she suffered knee ligament damage shortly before the tournament, Merel van Dongen was called up as a late replacement.

At the 2015 FIFA Women's World Cup, Van den Berg captained the Netherlands in their first ever appearance at the World Cup finals.

Van den Berg also captained the team that won the UEFA Women's Euro 2017 tournament. She made 4 appearances for the team at the tournament; starting 2 group stage games and being used as a substitute in two knockout games. After the tournament, the whole team was honoured by the Prime Minister Mark Rutte and Minister of Sport Edith Schippers and made Knights of the Order of Orange-Nassau.

She left the national team after the European cup and did not play on the 2019 World Cup silver medalist squad.

=== International goals ===
Scores and results list the Netherlands goal tally first.

Goal	Date	Venue	Opponent	Score	Result	Competition
1.	21 September 2011	TATA Steel Stadion, Velsen-Zuid, Netherlands	Serbia	2–0	6–0	2013 UEFA Women's Euro qualification
2.	23 November 2013	Stadion Woudestein, Rotterdam, Netherlands	Greece	7–0	7–0	2015 FIFA Women's World Cup qualification
3.	5 April 2014	Pankritio Stadium, Heraklion, Greece	Greece	4–0	6–0	2015 FIFA Women's World Cup qualification
4.	2 March 2016	Kyocera Stadion, The Hague, Netherlands	Switzerland	3–1	4–3	2016 UEFA Women's Olympic Qualifying Tournament
5.	6 March 2017	Lagos Municipal Stadium, Lagos, Portugal	Sweden	1–0	1–0	2017 Algarve Cup
6.	8 July 2017	Sparta Stadion, Rotterdam, Netherlands	Wales	5–0	5–0	Friendly

== Honours ==
=== Club ===
ADO Den Haag

- Eredivisie (1): 2011–12
- KNVB Women's Cup (1): 2011–12

LSK Kvinner

- Toppserien (1): 2015
- Norwegian Women's Cup (1): 2015

=== International ===
Netherlands

- UEFA Women's Euro (1): 2017

=== Individual ===
- Knight of the Order of Orange-Nassau: 2017

== Personal life ==
Van den Berg is in a relationship with Spanish footballer Georgina Carreras.
