= Melissa Fletcher =

Welsh footballer

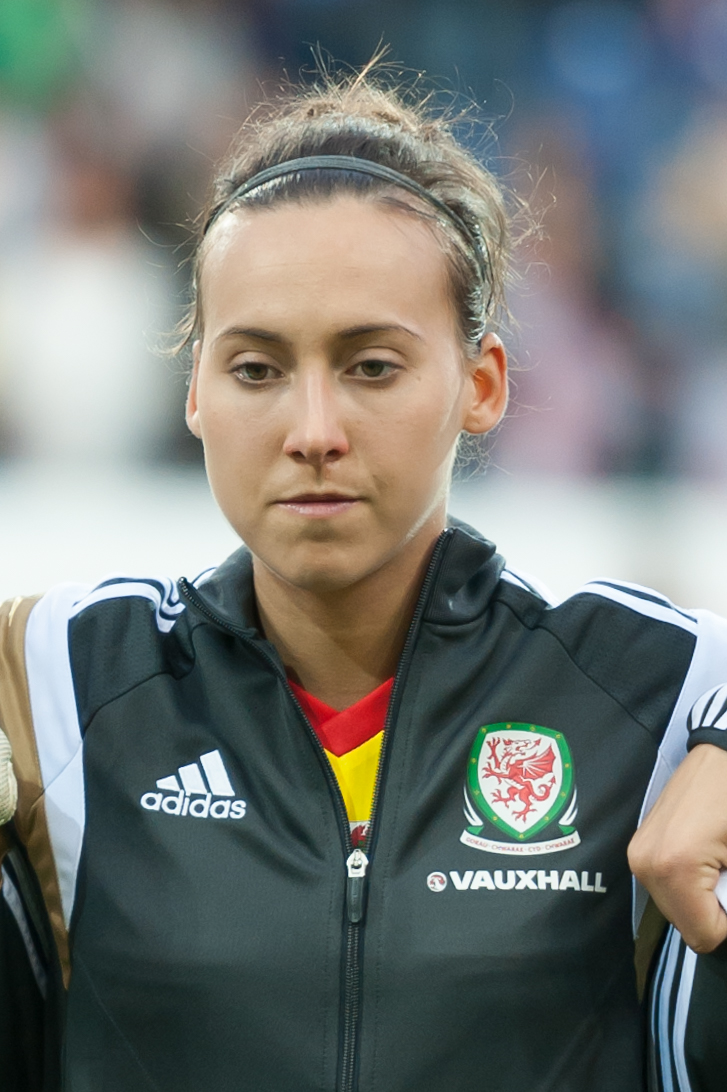
- Fletcher playing for Wales in 2015

Personal information
- Full name: Melissa Fletcher
- Date of birth: 28 January 1992 (age 34)
- Place of birth: England
- Position: Forward

Youth career
- 2000–2008: Reading

Senior career*
Years	Team	Apps	(Gls)
2008–2018	Reading	21	(5)

International career^{‡}
2015–2018	Wales	6	(0)
- * Club domestic league appearances and goals as of 15:25, 6 February 2016 (UTC) ‡ National team caps and goals as of 15:25, 6 February 2016 (UTC)

Melissa Fletcher (born 28 January 1992) is a former professional footballer who played as a forward for the Wales national team and FA WSL club Reading. She joined Reading as a youth player, graduating to the first team at the age of 16. She spent a further ten years with the club before retiring from playing in 2018 due to injury.

== Early life ==
Fletcher grew up in Bracknell and attended Garth Hill College for seven years.

== Club career ==
Fletcher began playing football for a local boys team, Bracknell Cavaliers. At age eight, she also joined the youth academy at Reading, playing simultaneously for the two sides before being forced to leave the Cavaliers at 12 years old due to age restrictions on boys and girls mixed teams. She was promoted to the Reading first team squad at the age of 16.

She helped the side win promotion to the FA Women's Super League in 2016 and made twelve appearances in their first season in the top flight. In January 2017, Fletcher signed her first fully professional contract with the club. Fletcher retired from football in July 2018 after undergoing two operations on an ankle injury, stating that her ankle was "not fit to continue."

== International career ==
Although born in England, Fletcher represents Wales at international level. She was selected for Wales' first UEFA Women's Euro 2017 qualifying match in Austria and started the 3–0 defeat in Sankt Pölten.

== Personal life ==
Fletcher is also a qualified accountant and previously worked part-time for Ernst & Young alongside her footballing career.
