= Kirsty Pearce =

English footballer

Personal information
- Full name: Kirsty Louise Pearce
- Date of birth: 19 April 1987 (age 39)
- Place of birth: England
- Positions: Midfielder; defender

Youth career
- 1994-2014: Portsmouth

Senior career*
Years	Team	Apps	(Gls)
2014–2019	Reading	58	(5)
- * Club domestic league appearances and goals

Kirsty Louise Pearce (née McGee; born 16 April 1987) is a retired English footballer who played as a midfielder and defender for Reading F.C. In 2015, she captained the club to promotion to FA WSL 1 and was the General Manager for the side after retiring at the end of the 2018–19 season for the following two seasons.
