= Lauren Bruton =

English footballer (born 1992)

Personal information
- Full name: Lauren Marie Bruton
- Date of birth: 22 November 1992 (age 33)
- Place of birth: Luton, England
- Positions: Winger; forward

Youth career
- Luton Town
- Arsenal

Senior career*
Years	Team	Apps	(Gls)
2008–2013	Arsenal	7	(0)
2013–2021	Reading	73	(13)
2021–2023	Charlton Athletic	17	(1)

International career^{‡}
2010–2011	England U19	9	(3)
2018	England	1	(0)
- * Club domestic league appearances and goals as of 00:40, 16 April 2023 (UTC) ‡ National team caps and goals as of 24:25, 22 April 2019 (UTC)

Lauren Marie Bruton (born 22 November 1992) is an English former football forward. She was born in Luton.

== Club career ==
Bruton began playing football at the age of eight years for Luton Town Ladies FC where she netted over 200 goals until the age of 15 before joining Arsenal. A little over 12 months later she made her FA Women's Premier League debut for Arsenal Ladies in December 2008, playing in the 7–0 win at home to Fulham.

In September 2013, Bruton left Arsenal for Reading Women, who were managed by her former Arsenal teammate Jayne Ludlow.

== International career ==
Bruton scored on her debut cap for the England Under-17s side, against Greece. She was part of the England side that finished fourth at the 2008 FIFA U-17 Women's World Cup in New Zealand. In July 2009 she was part of the English Under-19s squad that won the 2009 UEFA Women's Under-19 Championship in Belarus.

She was called into the senior England squad for the first time by coach Phil Neville in June 2018, as a replacement for the injured Jordan Nobbs and Isobel Christiansen. She remained an unused substitute for England's 3–1 2019 FIFA Women's World Cup qualification – UEFA Group 1 win over Russia in Moscow.

She made her full international debut in a 2019 FIFA Women's World Cup qualifying match against Kazakhstan on 4 September 2018.

Bruton has England legacy number 207. The FA announced their legacy numbers scheme to honour the 50th anniversary of England's inaugural international.

== Honours and awards ==
Team

- Under-19 European Championship: 2009
- FA Women's Cup: 2010/2011, 2012/2013
- WSL: 2011, 2012
- WSL Cup: 2012, 2013
- Premier League: 2009/2010

== Personal life ==
Bruton attended Cardinal Newman Catholic School in Luton.
