= Jo Potter =

English football manager (born 1984)

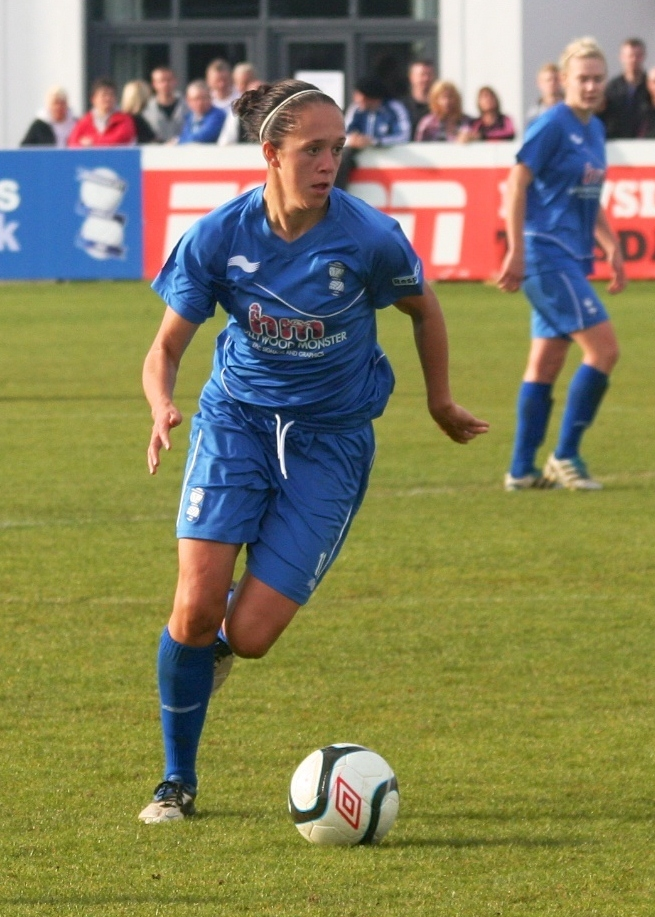
- Potter playing for Birmingham City in 2012

Personal information
- Full name: Josanne Potter
- Date of birth: 13 November 1984 (age 41)
- Place of birth: Mansfield, England
- Height: 5 ft 9 in (1.74 m)
- Positions: Midfielder; centre back

Senior career*
Years	Team	Apps	(Gls)
1999–2001	Chesterfield		
2001–2002	Sheffield Wednesday		
2002–2003	Birmingham City		
2003–2004	Arsenal		
2004–2005	Birmingham City		
2005–2007	Charlton Athletic		
2007–2009	Everton		
2010	Leicester City	6	(3)
2011–2016	Birmingham City	77	(8)
2016	Notts County	10	(1)
2017–2020	Reading	46	(0)

International career^{‡}
2004–2017	England	35	(3)

Managerial career
- 2023–2025: Rangers
- 2025–: Crystal Palace
Medal record
Women's football
Representing England
FIFA Women's World Cup
Bronze medal – third place	2015 Canada
- * Club domestic league appearances and goals as of 8 June 2020 (UTC+1) ‡ National team caps and goals as of 22 May 2018 (UTC)

Josanne Potter (born 13 November 1984) is an English professional football manager who is the head coach of Women's Super League club Crystal Palace. As a former footballer who played as a midfielder, she was originally a left-winger, and matured into a creative central midfield player. At club level Potter enjoyed three separate spells at Birmingham City and was noted for her crossing abilities and goalscoring record. She played in three FA Women's Cup finals – with Arsenal in 2004, Charlton Athletic in 2007 and Birmingham City in 2012. On the international stage, she often had to compete with Rachel Yankey and Sue Smith for a place on the left flank of the England team. After 2007 Potter worked as a BBC television football pundit. In June 2025, Potter was appointed the head coach of Crystal Palace.

== Club career ==
While attending The Manor School, Potter began her career at Chesterfield centre of excellence. She was with Sheffield Wednesday in 2001–2002, before signing for Birmingham City.

By 2003 she was playing for Arsenal, but left after one season to return to Birmingham City. She then signed for Charlton Athletic in the summer of 2005. When Charlton ditched their ladies team in 2007, Potter moved on to Everton, then returned to Birmingham City in January 2009.

With Birmingham not playing until the FA Women's Super League in March 2011, Potter signed a short-term deal with Leicester City in summer 2010.

In May 2013 Potter's excellent form with Birmingham, playing in a central midfield role, led to manager David Parker demanding that she be given another chance at international level. In June 2016, Potter and teammate Jade Moore both bought out the last six months of their Birmingham City contracts and left the club as free agents. Despite the players' long service, a statement on Birmingham City Ladies' website called the development "an excellent deal for the club".

Later that month Potter and Moore joined Notts County on short-term deals until the end of the 2016 FA WSL season. Less than a year later, however, the club folded before the 2017 FA WSL Spring Series. Becoming a free agent, Potter joined Reading along with teammates Jade Moore and Kirsty Linnett in May 2017. On 8 June 2020, Reading announced that Potter had left the club after her contract had expired.

She announced her retirement from football in January 2021.

== Managerial career ==
On 22 June 2023, Potter was appointed manager of Scottish Women's Premier League club Rangers, having previously worked as assistant manager at Birmingham City. Rangers won domestic cup doubles in both of Potter's seasons at the club.

On 24 June 2025, Potter was appointed as manager of Women's Super League 2 side Crystal Palace. She coached the side to promotion to the Women's Super League as Crystal Palace finished second in the 2025–26 Women's Super League 2 season.

== International career ==
Potter played for England at U16 level. She helped England U19s qualify for the 2003 UEFA Women's Under-19 Championship finals, scoring twice in 90 seconds against Bulgaria on 4 October 2002.

She was called up to the senior team for the first time for a friendly against Nigeria in April 2004, while playing for Arsenal. But she had to pull out due to a back injury. In September 2004 she featured as a substitute in two friendlies against the Netherlands.

Potter narrowly missed out on selection for UEFA Women's Euro 2005, but was recalled straight after the tournament following impressive performances for the U21 team. She scored against Hungary during England's record 13–0 win in October 2005. Potter withdrew from the World Cup qualifying play-off against France in September 2006 with damaged ankle ligaments. However, she returned to the team for the 1–0 friendly win over Scotland in March 2007.

After a seven-year absence from the England team, Potter was recalled by coach Mark Sampson for a friendly with Sweden in August 2014. She scored her second goal for England in September 2014, during a 10–0 win in Montenegro. In May 2015, Sampson named Potter in his final squad for the 2015 FIFA Women's World Cup, where the team finished a historic third. Potter was named to her second consecutive major tournament finals squad when Sampson selected her to his UEFA Women's Euro 2017 squad in April 2017.

Potter was allotted 156 when the FA announced their legacy numbers scheme to honour the 50th anniversary of England’s inaugural international.

=== International goals ===
Scores and results list England's goal tally first.

#	Date	Venue	Opponent	Scored	Result	Competition
1	27 October 2005	Tapolca Stadium, Tapolca, Hungary	Hungary	10–0	13–0	2007 FIFA Women's World Cup qualification
2	17 September 2014	Stadion Pod Malim Brdom, Petrovac, Montenegro	Montenegro	10–0	10–0	2015 FIFA Women's World Cup qualification
3	21 September 2015	A. Le Coq Arena, Tallinn, Estonia	Estonia	2–0	8–0	UEFA Women's Euro 2017 qualifying

== Media career ==
After missing out on a place in the FIFA Women's World Cup 2007 squad, Potter worked for the BBC as an expert analyst in their tournament coverage. She continued to work for the BBC on their women's football coverage.

Potter also worked as a Football Association skills coach, based in Sheffield. In 2015 Potter was employed by teammate Jade Moore, who had her own sports therapy business.

== Managerial statistics ==
As of 25 October 2026

Team	Nat	From	To	Record				
Team	Nat	From	To	G	W	D	L	Win %
Rangers Women	(Scotland)	22 June 2023	24 June 2025	82	64	9	9	78.05
Crystal Palace	(England)	24 June 2025	present	37	18	8	11	48.65
Total				119	82	17	20	68.91

== Honours ==
=== Club ===
Birmingham City

- FA Women's Cup (1): 2011–12

== Managerial honours ==
Rangers

- Women’s Scottish Cup: 2023–24, 2024–25
- Scottish Women's Premier League Cup: 2023–24, 2024–25
- City of Glasgow’s Women’s Cup: 2023

=== International ===
England

- FIFA Women's World Cup third place: 2015
