= 2022–23 Reading F.C. Women season =

Reading
2022–23 season
- Manager: Kelly Chambers
- Stadium: Select Car Leasing Stadium
- WSL: 12th (relegated)
- FA Cup: Quarterfinal vs Chelsea
- League Cup: Group stage
- Top goalscorer: League: Three Players (4); All: Sanne Troelsgaard (8)
Home colours	Away colours

The 2022–23 Reading F.C. Women season is the club's 16th season and their eighth in the FA Women's Super League, the highest level of the football pyramid.

The season concluded with Reading F.C. Women finishing 12th place and being relegated.

== Season events ==
On 7 July, Reading announced that Deanna Cooper and Lily Woodham had both signed new two-year contracts with the club, whilst Tia Primmer also signed her first professional contract with the club, until the summer of 2024.

On 20 July, Reading announced that Emma Mitchell had returned to the club and signed a one-year contract, following the birth of her daughter. The following day, 21 July, Reading announced the signing of Brooke Hendrix from Melbourne Victory on a two-year contract.

On 3 August, Reading announced the return of Becky Jane on a one-year contract after she'd left Charlton Athletic.

On 4 August, Crystal Palace announced that Chloe Peplow had joined their club on loan from Reading for the season.

On 5 August, Reading announced the double signing of Northern Ireland internationals Jackie Burns from BK Häcken and Glentoran respectively, and the signing of Charlie Wellings from Celtic.

On 11 August, Reading announced the signing of Diane Caldwell after her contract with Manchester United expired at the end of the previous season.

On 9 September, Readings opening day game against Liverpool, scheduled for 11 September, was postponed after the FA postponed all football fixtures from 9 – 11 September as a mark of respect following the death of Elizabeth II the previous day.

On 28 January, Reading announced the return of Jade Moore on loan from Manchester United for the remainder of the season.

On 31 January, Reading announced that Natasha Dowie had joined Liverpool on loan for the remainder of the season, whilst also announcing the signing of Easther Mayi Kith from Kristianstad on a contract until the summer of 2024.

On 2 February, Chloe Peplow ended her loan deal with Crystal Palace, and then joined Southampton on loan for the remainder of the season.

On 4 February, Reading announced the signing of Tinaya Alexander from Montpellier.

On 29 June, Reading announced the departure of 13 senior players following relegation, Hannah Poulter, Grace Moloney, Faye Bryson, Becky Jane, Emma Mukandi, Gemma Evans, Justine Vanhaevermaet, Chloe Peplow, Deanne Rose, Tinaya Alexander, Natasha Dowie and Emma Harries. Rachel Rowe also confirmed her departure from the club later the same day on her Instagram page.

== Squad ==
As of match played 27 May 2023

No.	Name	Nationality	Position	Date of birth (age)	Signed from	Signed in	Contract ends	Apps.	Goals
Goalkeepers
1	Grace Moloney	(Republic of Ireland)	GK	1 March 1993 (aged 30)	Academy	2009	2023	224	0
25	Jackie Burns	(Northern Ireland)	GK	6 March 1997 (aged 26)	Unattached	2022		12	0
30	Hannah Poulter	(England)	GK	26 April 2005 (aged 18)	Academy	2021		0	0
Defenders
2	Faye Bryson	(England)	DF	4 July 1997 (aged 25)	Bristol City	2021	2023	47	1
3	Emma Mukandi	(Scotland)	DF	19 September 1992 (aged 30)	Arsenal	2020	2023	43	1
5	Gemma Evans	(Wales)	DF	1 August 1996 (aged 26)	Bristol City	2021	2023	52	1
14	Deanna Cooper	(England)	DF	20 June 1993 (aged 29)	Chelsea	2020	2024	60	1
15	Brooke Hendrix	(United States)	DF	6 May 1993 (aged 30)	Melbourne Victory	2022	2024	9	0
16	Easther Mayi Kith	(Cameroon)	DF	28 March 1997 (aged 26)	Kristianstad	2023	2024	10	0
17	Diane Caldwell	(Republic of Ireland)	DF	11 September 1988 (aged 34)	Unattached	2022		14	0
18	Becky Jane	(England)	DF	6 August 1996 (aged 26)	Unattached	2022	2023	137	22
28	Lily Woodham	(Wales)	DF	3 September 2000 (aged 22)	Bristol City	2018	2024	68	0
31	Bethan Roberts	(Wales)	DF	14 May 2003 (aged 20)	Academy	2019	2023	14	0
Midfielders
9	Amalie Eikeland	(Norway)	MF	26 August 1995 (aged 27)	Sandviken	2019		101	8
20	Jade Moore	(England)	MF	22 October 1990 (aged 32)	on loan from Manchester United	2023	2023	69	8
23	Rachel Rowe	(Wales)	MF	13 September 1992 (aged 30)	Swansea City	2015	2024	156	18
27	Justine Vanhaevermaet	(Belgium)	MF	29 April 1992 (aged 31)	LSK Kvinner	2021	2023	48	8
33	Freya Meadows-Tuson	(England)	MF		Academy	2021		0	0
35	Mae Hunt	(England)	MF	29 November 2005 (aged 17)	Academy	2021		0	0
37	Tia Primmer	(England)	MF	2 May 2004 (aged 19)	Academy	2021	2024	35	3
51	Sanne Troelsgaard	(Denmark)	MF	15 August 1988 (aged 34)	Rosengård	2021	2023	40	8
Forwards
6	Deanne Rose	(Canada)	FW	3 March 1999 (aged 24)	Florida Gators	2021	2023	29	5
7	Charlie Wellings	(England)	FW	18 May 1998 (aged 25)	Celtic	2022		26	5
11	Lauren Wade	(Northern Ireland)	FW	22 November 1993 (aged 29)	Glentoran	2022		21	2
12	Emma Harries	(England)	FW	29 March 2002 (aged 21)	Academy	2020		64	6
19	Tinaya Alexander	(England)	FW	15 April 1999 (aged 24)	Montpellier	2023		1	0
34	Madison Perry	(England)	FW	24 January 2006 (aged 17)	Academy	2022		5	0
U21
	Anne Thomann	(England)	MF		Academy	2021		0	0
Out on loan
4	Chloe Peplow	(England)	MF	3 December 1998 (aged 24)	Tottenham Hotspur	2021		16	0
10	Natasha Dowie	(England)	FW	30 June 1988 (aged 34)	A.C. Milan	2021		36	11
	Sophie Baigent	(England)	DF		Academy	2021		0	0
Left during the season

=== Out on loan ===
Note: Flags indicate national team as defined under FIFA eligibility rules; some limited exceptions apply. Players may hold more than one non-FIFA nationality.

No. / Pos. / Nation / Player; 4 / MF / ENG / Chloe Peplow (at Southampton until end of the season)	No. / Pos. / Nation / Player; 10 / FW / ENG / Natasha Dowie (at Liverpool until end of the season)

== Transfers ==
=== In ===
Date	Position	Nationality	Name	From	Fee	Ref.
21 July 2022	DF	(United States)	Brooke Hendrix	Melbourne Victory	Undisclosed	
3 August 2022	DF	(England)	Becky Jane	Unattached	Free	
5 August 2022	GK	(Northern Ireland)	Jackie Burns	Unattached	Free	
5 August 2022	MF	(Northern Ireland)	Lauren Wade	Glentoran	Undisclosed	
5 August 2022	FW	(England)	Charlie Wellings	Celtic	Undisclosed	
11 August 2022	MF	(Republic of Ireland)	Diane Caldwell	Unattached	Free	
31 January 2023	DF	(Cameroon)	Easther Mayi Kith	Kristianstad	Undisclosed	
4 February 2023	FW	(England)	Tinaya Alexander	Montpellier	Undisclosed	

=== Loans in ===
Start date	Position	Nationality	Name	From	End date	Ref.
28 January 2023	MF	(England)	Jade Moore	Manchester United	End of season	

=== Loans out ===
Start date	Position	Nationality	Name	To	End date	Ref.
4 August 2022	MF	(England)	Chloe Peplow	Crystal Palace	2 February 2023	
31 January 2023	FW	(England)	Natasha Dowie	Liverpool	End of season	
2 February 2023	MF	(England)	Chloe Peplow	Southampton	End of season	
March 2023	DF	(England)	Sophie Baigent	London Bees	End of season	

=== Released ===
Date	Position	Nationality	Name	Joined	Date	Ref.
30 June 2023	GK	(England)	Hannah Poulter	USC Trojans		
30 June 2023	GK	(Republic of Ireland)	Grace Moloney	London City Lionesses	15 August 2023	
30 June 2023	DF	(England)	Faye Bryson	Central Coast Mariners	23 September 2023	
30 June 2023	DF	(England)	Sophie Baigent	London Bees	August 2023	
30 June 2023	DF	(England)	Becky Jane			
30 June 2023	DF	(Scotland)	Emma Mukandi	London City Lionesses	17 August 2023	
30 June 2023	DF	(Wales)	Gemma Evans	Manchester United	6 July 2023	
30 June 2023	MF	(Belgium)	Justine Vanhaevermaet	Everton	3 August 2023	
30 June 2023	MF	(England)	Chloe Peplow	Southampton	7 July 2023	
30 June 2023	MF	(Norway)	Amalie Eikeland	SK Brann	30 June 2023	
30 June 2023	MF	(Wales)	Rachel Rowe	Rangers	21 July 2023	
30 June 2023	FW	(Canada)	Deanne Rose	Leicester City	8 September 2023	
30 June 2023	FW	(England)	Tinaya Alexander	London City Lionesses	4 August 2023	
30 June 2023	FW	(England)	Natasha Dowie	Retirement	21 September 2023	
30 June 2023	FW	(England)	Emma Harries	West Ham United	2 August 2023	

== Friendlies ==
7 August 2022 Friendly	Bristol City	2–1	Reading	Bristol
BST (UTC+1)	Harrison 56'; T.Teisar 79' (pen.)	Report	Wade 35'	Stadium: Robins High Performance Centre

14 August 2022 Friendly	Birmingham City	1–0	Reading	Birmingham
14:00 BST (UTC+1)	L.Smith 70'	Report		Stadium: St Andrew's

28 August 2022 Friendly	Reading	3–2	Aston Villa	Reading
BST (UTC+1)	Mukandi 39'; Woodham 65'; Vanhaevermaet 72' (pen.)	Report	Daly 45', 85' (pen.)	Stadium: Select Car Leasing Stadium; Attendance: 0
Note: Match played behind closed doors.

== Competitions ==
=== Overview ===
Competition	First match	Last match	Starting round	Final position	Record							
Competition	First match	Last match	Starting round	Final position	Pld	W	D	L	GF	GA	GD	Win %
WSL	17 September 2022	27 May 2023	Matchday 1	12th	22	4	2	16	23	57	−34	18.18
FA Cup	29 January 2023	19 March 2023	Fourth round	Quarterfinal	3	0	2	1	3	5	−2	0.00
EFL Cup	2 October 2022	16 December 2022	Group stage	Group stage	3	2	0	1	8	2	+6	66.67
Total					28	6	4	18	34	64	−30	21.43

Last updated: 27 May 2023
Source: Competitions

=== WSL ===
==== Results summary ====
Overall								Home						Away					
Pld	W	D	L	GF	GA	GD	Pts	W	D	L	GF	GA	GD	W	D	L	GF	GA	GD
22	3	2	17	23	57	−34	11	3	2	6	12	23	−11	0	0	11	11	34	−23

Last updated: 27 May 2023.
Source: FA WSL

==== Results by matchday ====
Matchday	1	2	3	4	5	6	7	8	9	10	11	12	13	14	15	16	17	18	19	20	21	22
Ground	A (Note: matchday 2)	A (Note: matchday 3)	H (Note: matchday 4)	A (Note: matchday 5)	H (Note: matchday 6)	H (Note: matchday 7)	A (Note: matchday 8)	H (Note: matchday 1)	H	A	A	H	A	H	A	H	A	H	A	H	A	H
Result	L	L	L	L	W	L	L	D	W	L	L	L	L	W	L	D	L	L	L	L	L	L
Position	12	12	11	11	9	11	11	11	10	10	10	10	11	9	9	10	10	11	12	12	12	12

Updated to match(es) played on 27 May 2023. Source: Results
A = Away; H = Home; W = Win; D = Draw; L = Loss; P = Postponed

==== Results ====
17 September 2022 2	Manchester United	4–0	Reading	Leigh
12:00 BST (UTC+1)	Le Tissier 4', 25'; Zelem 14' (pen.); Russo 35'	Report	Woodham (yellow card) 65'	Stadium: Leigh Sports Village; Attendance: 7,315; Referee: Abigail Byrne

25 September 2022 3	Brighton & Hove Albion	2–1	Reading	Crawley
14:00 BST (UTC+1)	Olme (yellow card) 20'; Terland (yellow card) 36'; Lee 40'; Robinson 80'	Report	Caldwell (yellow card) 11'; Wellings 90+4'	Stadium: Broadfield Stadium; Attendance: 5,220; Referee: Lauren Impey

16 October 2022 4	Reading	0–1	Arsenal	Reading
18:45 BST (UTC+1)	Primmer (yellow card) 41'; Woodham (yellow card) 45+2'; Cooper (yellow card) 63'; Bryson (yellow card) 90+7'	Report	Blackstenius 30'; Little (penalty missed) 61'; McCabe (yellow card) 61'; Foord (yellow card) 64'	Stadium: Select Car Leasing Stadium; Attendance: 3,660; Referee: Louise Saunders

23 October 2022 5	West Ham United	3–2	Reading	Dagenham
15:00 BST (UTC+1)	Brynjarsdóttir 4'; Asseyi 22', 29'; Evans (yellow card) 61'; Stringer (yellow card) 77'	Report	Evans (yellow card) 35'; Cooper (yellow card) 59'; Wellings 75' (yellow card) 79'; Troelsgaard 82' (pen.)	Stadium: Chigwell Construction Stadium; Attendance: 1,041; Referee: Lauren Impey

30 October 2022 6	Reading	2–1	Leicester City	Reading
14:00 GMT (UTC)	Bryson (yellow card) 45+2'; Rowe (yellow card) 60' (goal) 90', 90+2'; Eikeland (yellow card) 75'	Report	Simon (yellow card) 31'; O'Brien (yellow card) 33'; Flint 36'	Stadium: Select Car Leasing Stadium; Attendance: 1,559; Referee: Emily Heaslip

6 November 2022 7	Reading	0–3	Manchester City	Reading
14:00 GMT (UTC)	Vanhaevermaet (yellow card) 12'	Report	Mukandi 53', 60' (o.g.); Shaw 76'	Stadium: Select Car Leasing Stadium; Attendance: 1,911; Referee: Abigail Byrne

20 November 2022 8	Aston Villa	3–1	Reading	Walsall
14:00 GMT (UTC)	Daly 37', 45+2', 76' (pen.)	Report	Wade 7'; Burns (red card) 65'	Stadium: Bescot Stadium; Attendance: 4,566; Referee: Adam Herczeg

24 November 2022 1	Reading	3–3	Liverpool	Reading
20:00 GMT (UTC)	Primmer 45+4'; Dowie 63'; Troelsgaard 89'	Report	Stengel 16', 68' van de Sanden (yellow card) 31'; Roberts 73'; Kearns (yellow card) 75'	Stadium: Select Car Leasing Stadium; Attendance: 1,479; Referee: Amy Fearns
Note: Match was originally scheduled for 11 September, but postponed on 9 September as a mark of respect following the death of Elizabeth II.

4 December 2022 9	Reading	1–0	Tottenham Hotspur	Reading
12:30 GMT (UTC)	Turner 12' (o.g.)	Report		Stadium: Select Car Leasing Stadium; Attendance: 1,052; Referee: Carl Brook

11 December 2022 10	Chelsea	3–2	Reading	Kingston upon Thames
18:45 GMT (UTC)	Kirby 16'; Čanković 29', 33'	Report	Cooper (yellow card) 49'; Troelsgaard 60'; Eikeland 61'; Bryson (yellow card) 64'	Stadium: Kingsmeadow; Attendance: 1,184; Referee: Kirsty Dowle

15 January 2023 11	Everton	3–2	Reading	Liverpool
13:00 GMT (UTC)	Snoeijs 9'; Park 32'; George 61'	Report	Vanhaevermaet 60'; Cooper 68'; Eikeland (yellow card) 85'	Stadium: Walton Hall Park; Attendance: 616; Referee: Tom Reeves

22 January 2023 12	Reading	0–1	Manchester United	Reading
14:00 GMT (UTC)		Report	Zelem (penalty missed) 40'; Williams 87'	Stadium: Select Car Leasing Stadium; Attendance: 5,108; Referee: Richie Watkins

5 February 2023 13	Liverpool	2–0	Reading	Birkenhead
14:00 GMT (UTC)	Kearns 62'; Holland 65'	Report		Stadium: Prenton Park; Attendance: 1,608; Referee: Jane Simms

5 March 2023 14	Reading	2–1	West Ham United	Reading
14:00 GMT (UTC)	Wellings 66'; Rowe 85'	Report	Parker (yellow card) 57'; Asseyi 76'	Stadium: Select Car Leasing Stadium; Attendance: 1,125; Referee: Lisa Benn

12 March 2023 15	Arsenal	4–0	Reading	Borehamwood
18:45 GMT (UTC)	Little 4' (pen.); Maanum 44'; Mukandi 47' (o.g.); Williamson 69'	Report	Moloney (yellow card) 56'; Woodham (yellow card) 86'	Stadium: Meadow Park; Attendance: 3,964; Referee: Amy Fearn

26 March 2023 16	Reading	2–2	Brighton & Hove Albion	Reading
14:00 BST (UTC+1)	Harries 46', 60', (yellow card) 86'	Report	Sarri 8', 13'; D.Carter (yellow card) 90+2'	Stadium: Select Car Leasing Stadium; Attendance: 970; Referee: Robert Madley

2 April 2023 17	Leicester City	2–1	Reading	Leicester
15:00 BST (UTC+1)	Tierney 20' (yellow card) 74'; Mace (yellow card) 45+5'; Jones 90+6'	Report	Woodham (yellow card) 41'; Wellings 45'; Bryson (yellow card) 66'	Stadium: King Power Stadium; Attendance: 2,527; Referee: Richie Watkins

23 April 2023 18	Reading	2–3	Everton	Reading
14:00 BST (UTC+1)	Vanhaevermaet 2' (pen.), 17'; Rowe (yellow card) 45'	Report	Bennison 41'; Snoeijs 62' (pen.); Sørensen 83'	Stadium: Select Car Leasing Stadium; Attendance: 1,235; Referee: Louise Saunders

30 April 2023 19	Manchester City	4–1	Reading	Manchester
14:00 BST (UTC+1)	Kelly 15'; Shaw 24'; Hemp 47'; Houghton 70'	Report	Troelsgaard 1'; Primmer (yellow card) 4'; Caldwell (yellow card) 82'	Stadium: Academy Stadium; Attendance: 3,102; Referee: Amy Fearn

7 May 2023 20	Reading	0–5	Aston Villa	Reading
14:00 BST (UTC+1)	Vanhaevermaet (yellow card) 39'; Moore (yellow card) 47'	Report	Daly 14', 55', 63'; Lehmann 41'; Hanson 44'	Stadium: Select Car Leasing Stadium; Attendance: 1,250; Referee: Abigail Byrne

20 May 2023 21	Tottenham Hotspur	4–1	Reading	Leyton
16:15 BST (UTC+1)	England 29', 62'; Bartrip (yellow card) 39'; Ildhusøy 41'; Graham 75'; Spencer (yellow card) 84'	Report	Moore (yellow card) 49'; Cooper (yellow card) 57'; Vanhaevermaet 79'; Bryson (yellow card) 90+3'	Stadium: Brisbane Road; Referee: Emily Heaslip

27 May 2023 22	Reading	0–3	Chelsea	Reading
14:00 BST (UTC+1)	Cooper (yellow card) 3'	Report	Kerr 18', 88'; Reiten 42'	Stadium: Select Car Leasing Stadium; Referee: Rebecca Welch

==== Table ====
Pos	Team	Pld	W	D	L	GF	GA	GD	Pts	Qualification or relegation
8	West Ham United	22	6	3	13	23	44	−21	21	
9	Tottenham Hotspur	22	5	3	14	31	47	−16	18	
10	Leicester City	22	5	1	16	15	48	−33	16	
11	Brighton & Hove Albion	22	4	4	14	26	63	−37	16	
12	Reading (R)	22	3	2	17	23	57	−34	11	Relegation to the Championship

Source: Women's Super League
Rules for classification: 1) Points; 2) Goal difference; 3) Number of goals scored.
(R) Relegated

=== FA Cup ===
29 January 2023 Fourth Round	Leicester City	2–2 (a.e.t.) (2–3 p)	Reading	Burton upon Trent
16:00 GMT (UTC)	Tierney 29'; Howard (yellow card) 87'; Cain 92'; Nevin (yellow card) 105+1'	Report	Troelsgaard 5' (yellow card) 29'; Moore (yellow card) 74'; Primmer (yellow card) 91'; Mukandi 102'	Stadium: Pirelli Stadium; Referee: Stacey Pearson
	Penalties
	Whelan (penalty scored); Cain (penalty missed); Plumptre (penalty missed); Eaton-Collins (penalty scored); Jones (penalty missed)		(penalty scored) Vanhaevermaet; (penalty scored) Dowie; (penalty scored) Mukandi; (penalty missed) Cooper

26 February 2023 Fifth Round	Tottenham Hotspur	0–0 (a.e.t.) (4–5 p)	Reading	Leyton
14:00 GMT (UTC)	Spence (yellow card) 90+3'	Report		Stadium: Brisbane Road; Attendance: 572; Referee: Amy Fearn
	Penalties
	Spence (penalty scored); Graham (penalty scored); Harrop (penalty missed); Ildhusøy (penalty scored); Ayane (penalty scored)		(penalty scored) Vanhaevermaet; (penalty scored) Mukandi; (penalty scored) Eikeland; (penalty scored) Nielsen; (penalty scored) Wade

19 March 2023 Quarterfinal	Reading	1–3	Chelsea	Reading
14:00 GMT (UTC)	Hendrix (yellow card) 25'; Bryson (yellow card) 45+3'; Troelsgaard (yellow card) 53' (goal) 70'	Report	Carter 23'; Mjelde 26' (pen.); Reiten 51'	Stadium: Select Car Leasing Stadium; Attendance: 1,865; Referee: Carl Brook

=== League Cup ===
==== Group stage ====
2 October 2022 1	Reading	1–2	Tottenham Hotspur	Reading
14:00 BST (UTC+1)	Primmer (yellow card) 45+3'; Dowie 90+11' (pen.)	Report	Cho 7' (yellow card) 57'; Karczewska 30'; Simon (yellow card) 90'	Stadium: Select Car Leasing Stadium; Referee: Amy Fearns

27 November 2022 2	Southampton	0–3	Reading	Southampton
14:00 GMT (UTC)		Report	Troelsgaard 5'; Wade 38'; Vanhaevermaet 60'	Stadium: St Mary's Stadium; Attendance: 4,258; Referee: Louise Saunders

16 December 2022 3	Coventry United	0–4	Reading	Coventry
19:00 GMT (UTC)		Report	Dowie 4', 26'; Troelsgaard 17' (yellow card) 45+2'; Wellings 64'; Bryson (yellow card) 66'	Stadium: Butts Park Arena; Referee: Phoebe Cross

Pos	Team	Pld	W	WPEN	LPEN	L	GF	GA	GD	Pts	Qualification	TOT	REA	COV	SOU
1	Tottenham Hotspur	3	3	0	0	0	8	2	+6	9	Advanced to knock-out stage	—	–	5–1	–
2	Reading	3	2	0	0	1	8	2	+6	6	Possible knock-out stage based on ranking	1–2	—	–	–
3	Coventry United	3	1	0	0	2	3	9	−6	3		–	0–4	—	2–0
4	Southampton	3	0	0	0	3	0	6	−6	0		0–1	0–3	–	—

Rules for classification: 1) Points; 2) Goal difference; 3) Number of goals scored; 4) Number of wins; 5) Head-to-head record

Pos	Grp	Team	Pld	W	WPEN	LPEN	L	GF	GA	GD	Pts	PPG	Qualification
1	B	Liverpool	4	3	0	0	1	6	2	+4	9	2.25	Advanced to knock-out stage
2	A	Manchester United	4	2	0	2	0	11	5	+6	8	2.00	
3	E	Reading	3	2	0	0	1	8	2	+6	6	2.00	
4	C	Brighton & Hove Albion	3	2	0	0	1	6	2	+4	6	2.00	
5	D	Lewes	3	2	0	0	1	6	2	+4	6	2.00	

== Squad statistics ==
As of match played 27 May 2023

=== Appearances ===
No.	Pos	Nat	Player	Total		WSL		FA Cup		League Cup	
No.	Pos	Nat	Player	Apps	Goals	Apps	Goals	Apps	Goals	Apps	Goals
1	GK	(Republic of Ireland) IRL	Grace Moloney	17	0	12+1	0	3	0	1	0
2	DF	(England) ENG	Faye Bryson	23	0	10+7	0	1+2	0	2+1	0
3	DF	(Scotland) SCO	Emma Mukandi	26	1	20+1	0	3	1	2	0
5	DF	(Wales) WAL	Gemma Evans	25	0	17+2	0	2+1	0	3	0
6	FW	(Canada) CAN	Deanne Rose	3	0	2+1	0	0	0	0	0
7	FW	(England) ENG	Charlie Wellings	26	5	14+6	4	3	0	1+2	1
9	MF	(Norway) NOR	Amalie Eikeland	28	1	22	1	3	0	3	0
11	FW	(Northern Ireland) NIR	Lauren Wade	21	2	6+9	1	0+3	0	2+1	1
12	FW	(England) ENG	Emma Harries	21	2	13+3	2	2	0	1+2	0
14	DF	(England) ENG	Deanna Cooper	17	1	11+3	1	1	0	2	0
15	DF	(United States) USA	Brooke Hendrix	9	0	2+5	0	1	0	0+1	0
16	DF	(Cameroon) CMR	Easther Mayi Kith	10	0	8	0	2	0	0	0
17	DF	(Republic of Ireland) IRL	Diane Caldwell	14	0	9+2	0	0	0	2+1	0
18	DF	(England) ENG	Becky Jane	2	0	0+1	0	0	0	0+1	0
19	FW	(England) ENG	Tinaya Alexander	1	0	0+1	0	0	0	0	0
20	MF	(England) ENG	Jade Moore	12	0	7+2	0	2+1	0	0	0
23	MF	(Wales) WAL	Rachel Rowe	24	3	17+1	3	3	0	3	0
25	GK	(Northern Ireland) NIR	Jackie Burns	12	0	10	0	0	0	2	0
27	MF	(Belgium) BEL	Justine Vanhaevermaet	24	5	18+2	4	2	0	2	1
28	DF	(Wales) WAL	Lily Woodham	21	0	14+2	0	3	0	2	0
34	FW	(England) ENG	Madison Perry	5	0	0+5	0	0	0	0	0
37	MF	(England) ENG	Tia Primmer	21	1	10+7	1	0+1	0	1+2	0
51	MF	(Denmark) DEN	Sanne Troelsgaard	25	8	13+7	4	2+1	2	2	2
Players away from the club on loan:
10	FW	(England) ENG	Natasha Dowie	14	4	7+3	1	0+1	0	2+1	3
Players who appeared for Reading but left during the season:

=== Goal scorers ===
Place	Position	Nation	Number	Name	WSL	FA Cup	League Cup	Total
1	MF	(Denmark)	51	Sanne Troelsgaard	4	2	2	8
2	FW	(England)	7	Charlie Wellings	4	0	1	5
2	MF	(Belgium)	27	Justine Vanhaevermaet	4	0	1	5
4	FW	(England)	10	Natasha Dowie	1	0	3	4
5	MF	(Wales)	23	Rachel Rowe	3	0	0	3
6	FW	(England)	12	Emma Harries	2	0	0	2
6	FW	(Northern Ireland)	11	Lauren Wade	1	0	1	2
8	MF	(England)	37	Tia Primmer	1	0	0	1
8	MF	(Norway)	9	Amalie Eikeland	1	0	0	1
8	DF	(England)	14	Deanna Cooper	1	0	0	1
8	DF	(Scotland)	3	Emma Mukandi	0	1	0	1
8				Own goal	1	0	0	1
Total					21	3	8	32

=== Clean sheets ===
Place	Position	Nation	Number	Name	WSL	FA Cup	League Cup	Total
1	GK	(Northern Ireland)	25	Jackie Burns	1	0	1	2
1	GK	(Republic of Ireland)	1	Grace Moloney	0	1	1	2
Total					1	1	2	4

=== Disciplinary record ===
Number	Nation	Position	Name	WSL		FA Cup		League Cup		Total	
Number	Nation	Position	Name	Yellow card	Red card	Yellow card	Red card	Yellow card	Red card	Yellow card	Red card
1	(Republic of Ireland)	GK	Grace Moloney	1	0	0	0	0	0	1	0
2	(England)	DF	Faye Bryson	5	0	1	0	1	0	7	0
5	(Wales)	DF	Gemma Evans	1	0	0	0	0	0	1	0
7	(England)	FW	Charlie Wellings	1	0	0	0	0	0	1	0
9	(Norway)	MF	Amalie Eikeland	2	0	0	0	0	0	2	0
12	(England)	FW	Emma Harries	1	0	0	0	0	0	1	0
14	(England)	DF	Deanna Cooper	5	0	0	0	0	0	5	0
15	(United States)	DF	Brooke Hendrix	0	0	1	0	0	0	1	0
17	(Republic of Ireland)	DF	Diane Caldwell	2	0	0	0	0	0	2	0
20	(England)	MF	Jade Moore	2	0	1	0	0	0	3	0
23	(Wales)	MF	Rachel Rowe	2	0	0	0	0	0	2	0
25	(Northern Ireland)	GK	Jackie Burns	0	1	0	0	0	0	0	1
27	(Belgium)	MF	Justine Vanhaevermaet	2	0	0	0	0	0	2	0
28	(Wales)	DF	Lily Woodham	4	0	0	0	0	0	4	0
37	(England)	MF	Tia Primmer	2	0	1	0	1	0	4	0
51	(Denmark)	MF	Sanne Troelsgaard	0	0	2	0	1	0	3	0
Players away on loan:
Players who left Reading during the season:
Total				30	1	6	0	3	0	39	1
