= 2019–20 Chelsea F.C. Women season =

Chelsea
2019–20 season
- Chairman: Adrian Jacob
- Manager: Emma Hayes
- Stadium: Kingsmeadow
- FA WSL: 1st
- FA Cup: Quarter-finals
- League Cup: Winners
- Top goalscorer: League: Beth England (14 goals); All: Beth England (21 goals)
- Highest home attendance: 24,564 (vs. Tottenham Hotspur, 8 September 2019, FA WSL)
- Lowest home attendance: 540 (vs. Liverpool, 15 December 2019, FA WSL)
Home colours	Away colours	Third colours

The 2019–20 season was Chelsea Women's 28th competitive season and 10th consecutive season in the FA Women's Super League, the top flight of English women's football. Chelsea managed to take back the title of the domestic league since the 2017–18 season, as well as winning the League Cup. They were also unbeaten in the league before it was concluded on a points-per-game ratio due to the COVID-19 pandemic.

== Review ==
This season began with the 2019 FIFA Women's World Cup in France from 7 June to 7 July 2019. A total of twelve players are across the Channel with six different countries, making Chelsea the best-represented English club. England took the most players from Chelsea, as midfielder and club captain Karen Carney, center back Millie Bright, goalkeeper Carly Telford, and 2017-18 FWA, PFA Women's Players' Player of the Year and inaugural Ballon d’Or Féminin nominee Fran Kirby headed to France with The Lionesses. Blues defender Maria Thorisdottir and midfielder Maren Mjelde headed to the World Cup for Norway along with new signing Guro Reiten. Sweden took Chelsea left back Jonna Andersson, versatile defender Magdalena Eriksson, and departing star goalkeeper Hedvig Lindahl. Chelsea left back and New Zealand captain Ali Riley debuted for the Football Ferns in 2007 and played in her fourth World Cup. South Korea and Scotland took one each of Chelsea players, Ji So-yun and Erin Cuthbert respectively.

== Squad information ==
=== First team squad ===
As of 13 December 2019.

No.	Name	Nat	Since	Date of birth (age)	Signed from
Goalkeepers
28	Carly Telford	(England)	2017	7 July 1987 (aged 32)	(England) Notts County
30	Ann-Katrin Berger	(Germany)	2019	9 October 1990 (aged 28)	(England) Birmingham City
32	Emily Orman	(England)	2019	5 November 2002 (aged 16)	Homegrown
Defenders
2	Maria Thorisdottir	(Norway)	2017	5 June 1993 (aged 26)	(Norway) Klepp
3	Hannah Blundell	(England)	2013	25 May 1994 (aged 25)	Homegrown
4	Millie Bright	(England)	2014	21 August 1993 (aged 26)	(England) Doncaster Rovers Belles
6	Anita Asante	(England)	2018	27 April 1985 (aged 34)	(Sweden) FC Rosengård
16	Magdalena Eriksson (captain)	(Sweden)	2017	6 September 1993 (aged 26)	(Sweden) Linköpings
21	Deanna Cooper	(England)	2017	19 June 1993 (aged 26)	(England) London Bees
25	Jonna Andersson	(Sweden)	2017	2 January 1993 (aged 26)	(Sweden) Linköpings
Midfielders
5	Sophie Ingle	(Wales)	2018	2 September 1991 (aged 28)	(England) Liverpool
7	Jessica Carter	(England)	2018	27 October 1997 (aged 21)	(England) Birmingham City
10	Ji So-yun	(South Korea)	2014	21 February 1991 (aged 28)	(Japan) INAC Kobe Leonessa
11	Guro Reiten	(Norway)	2019	26 July 1994 (aged 25)	(Norway) LSK Kvinner
18	Maren Mjelde	(Norway)	2017	6 November 1989 (aged 29)	(Norway) Avaldsnes IL
24	Drew Spence	(England)	2008	23 October 1992 (aged 26)	Homegrown
27	Jamie-Lee Napier	(Scotland)	2019	6 April 2000 (aged 19)	(Scotland) Hibernian
31	Charlotte Fleming	(England)	2019	9 January 2002 (aged 17)	Homegrown
34	Charlotte Wardlaw	(England)	2019	20 February 2003 (aged 16)	Homegrown
Forwards
9	Beth England	(England)	2016	3 June 1994 (aged 25)	(England) Doncaster Rovers Belles
14	Fran Kirby	(England)	2015	29 June 1993 (aged 26)	(England) Reading
17	Adelina Engman	(Finland)	2018	11 October 1994 (aged 24)	(Sweden) Kopparbergs/Göteborg FC
20	Sam Kerr	(Australia)	2019	10 September 1993 (aged 25)	(United States) Chicago Red Stars
22	Erin Cuthbert	(Scotland)	2016	19 July 1998 (aged 21)	(Scotland) Glasgow City
23	Ramona Bachmann	(Switzerland)	2017	25 October 1990 (aged 28)	(Germany) Wolfsburg
33	Lexi Lloyd-Smith	(England)	2019	5 March 2003 (aged 16)	Homegrown
35	Emily Murphy	(England)	2019	2 March 2003 (aged 16)	Homegrown

== New contracts ==
No.	Pos	Player	Contract end	Date	Source
10	MF	(South Korea) Ji So-yun	2022	7 August 2019	
25	DF	(Sweden) Jonna Andersson	2022	22 November 2019	
3	DF	(England) Hannah Blundell	2022	13 February 2020	
24	MF	(England) Drew Spence	2022	11 March 2020	

== Transfers and loans ==
=== In ===
Pos	Player	Transferred From	Fee	Date	Source
MF	(Norway) Guro Reiten	(Norway) LSK Kvinner	£12,000	31 May 2019	
FW	(Australia) Sam Kerr	(United States) Chicago Red Stars	Out of contract	13 November 2019	
MF	(Scotland) Jamie-Lee Napier	(Scotland) Hibernian	Out of contract	13 December 2019	

=== Out ===
Pos	Player	Transferred To	Fee	Date	Source
GK	(Sweden) Hedvig Lindahl	(Germany) VfL Wolfsburg	End of contract	11 May 2019	
MF	(England) Karen Carney	Retired		6 July 2019	
DF	(England) Jade Bailey	(England) Liverpool	Undisclosed	9 July 2019	
GK	(England) Lizzie Durack	Retired		15 July 2019	
DF	(New Zealand) Ali Riley	(Germany) Bayern Munich	Undisclosed	18 July 2019	

== Coaching staff ==
Position	Staff
Manager	(England) Emma Hayes
Assistant Manager	(England) Paul Green
Coach	(England) TJ O'Leary
Goalkeeper coach	(England) Stuart Searle

Source: Chelsea F.C.

== Non-competitive ==
=== Pre-season ===
6 August 2019 Women's French Cup	Montpellier (France)	5–2	(England) Chelsea	Colomiers
18:00 BST	Toletti 4', 45+1'; Puntigam 12', 19'; Mondésir 60'	Report	Reiten 45+2'; Mjelde 90+3'	Stadium: Stade Michel-Bendichou; Referee: Savina El Bour

8 August 2019 Women's French Cup	Bayern Munich (Germany)	5–0	(England) Chelsea	Colomiers
18:00 BST	Beerensteyn 13', 51', 72'; Gwinn 30'; Damnjanović 43'	Report		Stadium: Stade Michel-Bendichou

20 August 2019 Friendly	Israel	1–3	(England) Chelsea	Petah Tikva
17:30 BST	Cohen 63'	Report	England 6'; Eriksson 51'; Ingle 71'	Stadium: Ha-Moshava Stadium; Attendance: 8,534

== Competitions ==
=== Women's Super League ===
==== League table ====
Pos	Team	Pld	W	D	L	GF	GA	GD	Pts	PPG	Qualification
1	Chelsea (C)	15	12	3	0	47	11	+36	39	2.60	Qualification for the Champions League knockout phase
2	Manchester City	16	13	1	2	39	9	+30	40	2.50	Qualification for the Champions League knockout phase
3	Arsenal	15	12	0	3	40	13	+27	36	2.40	
4	Manchester United	14	7	2	5	24	12	+12	23	1.64	
5	Reading	14	6	3	5	21	24	−3	21	1.50	

Source: FA WSL, BBC
Rules for classification: Initially: 1) Points; 2) Goal difference; 3) Number of goals scored. After abandonment of season: 1) Points per game
(C) Champions

==== Results summary ====
Overall								Home						Away					
Pld	W	D	L	GF	GA	GD	Pts	W	D	L	GF	GA	GD	W	D	L	GF	GA	GD
15	12	3	0	47	11	+36	39	8	0	0	25	4	+21	4	3	0	22	7	+15

Last updated: 23 February 2020.
Source: FA WSL

==== Results by matchday ====
Matchday	1	2	3	4	5	6	7	8	9	10	11	12	13	14	15	16	17	18	19	20	21	22
Result	W	D	W	W	W	W	W	P	W	D	W	W	W	W	P	W	D	P	P	P	P	P
Position	2	3	3	2	1	1	1	3	2	3	3	3	3	2	2	2	2	1	1	1	1	1

Updated to match(es) played on 23 February 2020. Source: FA WSL
W = Win; D = Draw; L = Loss

==== Matches ====
Sun 8 Sep 2019 1	Chelsea	1–0	Tottenham Hotspur	Fulham
12:30 BST (UTC+01:00)	England 4'	Report	Schillaci (yellow card) 11'; Furness (yellow card) 86'	Stadium: Stamford Bridge; Attendance: 24,564; Referee: Amy Fearn

Sun 15 Sep 2019 2	Brighton & Hove Albion	1–1	Chelsea	Crawley
14:00 BST (UTC+01:00)	Buet (yellow card) 50'; Whelan 84'	Report	Bright (yellow card) 86'; Engman 90+1'	Stadium: The People's Pension Stadium; Attendance: 1,352; Referee: Lee Collins

Sun 29 Sep 2019 3	Bristol City	0–4	Chelsea	Filton
15:00 BST (UTC+01:00)	Harrison (yellow card) 55'	Report	Reiten 3', 10'; Ji 18'; Ingle 78'	Stadium: Stoke Gifford Stadium; Attendance: 986; Referee: Lisa Benn

Sun 13 Oct 2019 4	Chelsea	2–1	Arsenal	Kingston upon Thames
15:00 BST (UTC+01:00)	Ji (yellow card) 38'; England 57'; Thorisdottir 85'	Report	van de Donk 9'; Miedema (yellow card) 39'; Mead (yellow card) 45+2'	Stadium: Kingsmeadow; Attendance: 4,149; Referee: Rebecca Welch

Sun 27 Oct 2019 5	West Ham United	1–3	Chelsea	Romford
15:00 GMT (UTC+00:00)	Leon 58'	Report	Ingle 70'; Ji 72'; Spence (yellow card) 90+3', (goal) 90+5'	Stadium: Rush Green Training Ground; Attendance: 2,122; Referee: Robert Whitton

Sun 17 Nov 2019 6	Chelsea	1–0	Manchester United	Kingston upon Thames
14:00 GMT (UTC+00:00)	Cuthbert (yellow card) 45+2'; Mjelde 65' (pen.)	Report	Turner (yellow card) 14'; McManus (yellow card) 42'	Stadium: Kingsmeadow; Attendance: 4,790; Referee: Jack Packman

Sun 24 Nov 2019 7	Birmingham City	0–6	Chelsea	Solihull
14:00 GMT (UTC+00:00)		Report	Ji 2'; Bright 37'; England 45+1', 63'; Spence 48', 52'	Stadium: SportNation.Bet Stadium; Attendance: 1,159; Referee: Stacey Pearson

Sun 1 Dec 2019 8	Everton	Postponed	Chelsea	Walton
12:30 GMT (UTC+00:00)		Report		Stadium: Walton Hall Park
Note: Postponed due to frozen pitch

Sun 8 Dec 2019 9	Chelsea	2–1	Manchester City	Kingston upon Thames
14:00 GMT (UTC+00:00)	England 79'; Mjelde 81'; Ingle (yellow card) 90+3'	Report	Weir (yellow card) 33', (goal) 59'; Hemp (yellow card) 45+1'	Stadium: Kingsmeadow; Attendance: 3,498; Referee: Amy Fearn

Sun 15 Dec 2019 10	Liverpool	1–1	Chelsea	Birkenhead
14:00 GMT (UTC+00:00)	Charles 5'; Linnett (yellow card) 59'; Jane (yellow card) 64'; Bradley-Auckland (yellow card) 78'	Report	England 15'; Cuthbert (yellow card) 84'; Eriksson (yellow card) 90+1'	Stadium: Prenton Park; Attendance: 540; Referee: Louise Saunders

Sun 5 Jan 2020 11	Chelsea	3–1	Reading	Kingston upon Thames
14:00 GMT (UTC+00:00)	England 40'; Reiten 64'; Cuthbert 75'	Report	Williams 14'; Moloney (red card) 16'; Allen (yellow card) 67'	Stadium: Kingsmeadow; Attendance: 2,828; Referee: Stacey Pearson

Sun 12 Jan 2020 12	Chelsea	6–1	Bristol City	Kingston upon Thames
14:00 GMT (UTC+00:00)	England 28', 82'; Blundell 40'; Carter 45', (yellow card) 90+3'; Ji 45+2', 50'; Bright (yellow card) 74'	Report	Salmon 15'; Pattinson (yellow card) 70'	Stadium: Kingsmeadow; Attendance: 2,866; Referee: Emily Heaslip

Sun 19 Jan 2020 13	Arsenal	1–4	Chelsea	Borehamwood
14:00 GMT (UTC+00:00)	McCabe (yellow card) 36'; Mead 74'; Wälti (yellow card) 88'	Report	England 10'; Kerr 13'; Ingle 20'; Mjelde (yellow card) 65'; Reiten 68'	Stadium: Meadow Park; Attendance: 4,000; Referee: Abigail Byrne

Sun 2 Feb 2020 14	Chelsea	8–0	West Ham United	Kingston upon Thames
14:00 GMT (UTC+00:00)	Mjelde 7', 61'; England 12', 56'; Ingle 45'; Cuthbert 52'; Bachmann 88'; Murphy 90+1'	Report	Flaherty (yellow card) 26'; Longhurst (yellow card) 49'; Brosnan (yellow card) 90+2'	Stadium: Kingsmeadow; Attendance: 3,304; Referee: Amy Fearn

Sun 9 Feb 2020 15	Manchester United	Postponed	Chelsea	Leigh
16:30 GMT (UTC+00:00)		Report		Stadium: Leigh Sports Village
Note: All WSL games postponed due to adverse weather conditions

Wed 12 Feb 2020 16	Chelsea	2–0	Birmingham City	Kingston upon Thames
19:00 GMT (UTC+00:00)	Reiten 45'; England 58'	Report		Stadium: Kingsmeadow; Attendance: 1,928; Referee: Robert Whitton

Sun 23 Feb 2020 17	Manchester City	3–3	Chelsea	Manchester
14:00 GMT (UTC+00:00)	White 22'; Stanway 60'; Weir (yellow card) 71'; Hemp 76'	Report	Ji 39'; Eriksson 68'; England 74'	Stadium: Academy Stadium; Attendance: 3,542; Referee: Rebecca Welch

Sun 22 Mar 2020 18*	Chelsea	Postponed	Everton	Kingston upon Thames
14:00 GMT (UTC+00:00)				Stadium: Kingsmeadow

Sun 29 Mar 2020 19*	Tottenham Hotspur	Postponed	Chelsea	Canons Park
14:00 BST (UTC+01:00)				Stadium: The Hive Stadium

Sun 5 Apr 2020 20*	Chelsea	Postponed	Brighton & Hove Albion	Kingston upon Thames
14:00 BST (UTC+01:00)				Stadium: Kingsmeadow

Sun 26 Apr 2020 21*	Reading	Postponed	Chelsea	High Wycombe
14:00 BST (UTC+01:00)				Stadium: Adams Park

Sat 16 May 2020 22*	Chelsea	Postponed	Liverpool	Kingsmeadow
14:00 BST (UTC+01:00)				Attendance: Kingston upon Thames

- Note: The FA confirmed the termination of the 2019/20 Women’s Super League due to the COVID-19 pandemic.

=== FA Cup ===
Sun 26 Jan 2020 Fourth round proper	Charlton Athletic	0–4	Chelsea	Crayford
13:00 GMT (UTC+00:00)	Clifford (yellow card) 42'; Coombs (yellow card) 57'	Report	Spence 45', 57' (pen.); Murphy 47', 84'	Stadium: The Oakwood; Attendance: 844; Referee: Robert Massey-Ellis

Mon 17 Feb 2020 Fifth round proper	Chelsea	1–0	Liverpool	Kingston upon Thames
19:00 GMT (UTC+00:00)	Reiten 26'	Report		Stadium: Kingsmeadow

Sun 27 Sep 2020 Quarter-final	Everton	2–1	Chelsea	Liverpool
13:00 BST (UTC+01:00)	Graham 42'; Gauvin 62'	Report	Cuthbert 4'	Stadium: Goodison Park; Attendance: 0 Referee: Simon Mather

=== League Cup ===
==== Group stage ====
Pos	Team	Pld	W	WPEN	LPEN	L	GF	GA	GD	Pts	Qualification	CHE	REA	WHU	TOT	CRY	LEW
1	Chelsea	5	4	0	1	0	13	3	+10	13	Advance to Knock-out stage	—	1–1	2–0	5–1	—	—
2	Reading	5	3	1	0	1	14	4	+10	11	Advance to Knock-out stage	—	—	0–1	—	6–0	3–2
3	West Ham United	5	3	0	1	1	13	5	+8	10		—	—	—	2–2	7–0	3–1
4	Tottenham Hotspur	5	2	1	0	2	12	11	+1	8		—	0–4	—	—	—	6–0
5	Crystal Palace	5	1	0	0	4	3	21	−18	3		0–3	—	—	0–3	—	—
6	Lewes	5	0	0	0	5	6	17	−11	0		1–2	—	—	—	2–3	—

Updated to match(es) played on 11 December 2019. Source: thefa.com
Rules for classification: 1) Points; 2) Goal difference; 3) Number of goals scored; 4) Number of wins; 5) Head-to-head record

==== Group D ====
Sun 22 Sept 2019 1	Chelsea	2–0	West Ham United	Kingston upon Thames
14:00 BST (UTC+01:00)	England 50'; Reiten 70'	Report	Leon (yellow card) 36'; Kiernan (yellow card) 78'	Stadium: Kingsmeadow; Attendance: 3,041; Referee: Kirsty Dowle

Sun 20 Oct 2019 2	Crystal Palace	0–3	Chelsea	Bromley
14:00 BST (UTC+01:00)	Johnson (yellow card) 57'	Report	England 51', 55'; Spence 76'	Stadium: Hayes Lane; Attendance: 807; Referee: Abigail Bryne

Sat 2 Nov 2019 3	Lewes	1–2	Chelsea	Lewes
15:00 GMT (UTC+00:00)	Rood 18'	Report	Cuthbert 12'; Eriksson 80'	Stadium: The Dripping Pan; Attendance: 1,019; Referee: Louise McWhinnie

Wed 20 Nov 2019 4	Chelsea	5–1	Tottenham Hotspur	Kingston upon Thames
19:00 GMT (UTC+00:00)	Wardlaw (yellow card) 25'; Spence 49'; Cuthbert 57' (pen.); England 59', 84'; Cooper 76'; Carter (yellow card) 80'	Report	Haines (yellow card) 16'; Wynne (yellow card) 64'; Ayane 78'; Neville (yellow card) 83'	Stadium: Kingsmeadow; Attendance: 1,999; Referee: Lisa Benn

Wed 11 Dec 2019 5	Chelsea	1–1 (2–4 p)	Reading	Kingston upon Thames
19:00 GMT (UTC+00:00)	Carter (yellow card) 14'; Cooper 66'	Report	Potter 15'; Moore (yellow card) 44'	Stadium: Kingsmeadow; Attendance: 1,783; Referee: Paul Johnson
	Penalties
	Cuthbert (penalty scored); Mjelde (penalty scored); England (penalty missed); Cooper (penalty missed)		(penalty scored) Williams; (penalty scored) Chaplen; (penalty scored) Farrow; (penalty scored) Allen

==== Knockout phase ====
Wed 15 Jan 2020 Quarter-final	Chelsea	3–1	Aston Villa	Kingston upon Thames
19:00 GMT (UTC+00:00)	Eriksson 55'; Ingle (yellow card) 76'; Ji 81'; Murphy 90+1'	Report	Welsh 84'	Stadium: Kingsmeadow; Attendance: 1,799; Referee: Louise Saunders

Wed 29 Jan 2020 Semi-final	Manchester United	0–1	Chelsea	Leigh
19:30 GMT (UTC+00:00)	McManus (yellow card) 34'; James (yellow card) 45+1'	Report	Ingle (yellow card) 28'; Eriksson (yellow card) 57'; Mjelde 72'	Stadium: Leigh Sports Village; Attendance: 1,044; Referee: Elizabeth Simms

Sat 29 February 2020 Final	Arsenal	1–2	Chelsea	Nottinghamshire
17:30 GMT (UTC+00:00)	Quinn (yellow card) 81'; Williamson 85'	Report	England 9', 90+2'; Eriksson (yellow card) 57'; Cuthbert (yellow card) 77'	Stadium: City Ground; Attendance: 6,743; Referee: Helen Conley

== Statistics ==
=== Appearances and goals ===
As of 27 September 2020

No.	Pos	Nat	Player	Total		FA WSL		FA Cup		League Cup	
No.	Pos	Nat	Player	Apps	Goals	Apps	Goals	Apps	Goals	Apps	Goals
Goalkeepers:
28	GK	(England) ENG	Carly Telford	9	0	2	0	1	0	6	0
30	GK	(Germany) GER	Ann-Katrin Berger	17	0	13	0	2	0	2	0
32	GK	(England) ENG	Emily Orman	0	0	0	0	0	0	0	0
Defenders:
2	DF	(Norway) NOR	Maria Thorisdottir	8	1	0+5	1	0	0	2+1	0
3	DF	(England) ENG	Hannah Blundell	14	1	4+4	1	2	0	4	0
4	DF	(England) ENG	Millie Bright	24	1	15	1	2+1	0	6	0
6	DF	(England) ENG	Anita Asante	2	0	0	0	0	0	2	0
16	DF	(Sweden) SWE	Magdalena Eriksson	23	3	14	1	2	0	7	2
21	DF	(England) ENG	Deanna Cooper	8	2	0+1	0	1	0	6	2
25	DF	(Sweden) SWE	Jonna Andersson	24	0	14+1	0	2	0	4+3	0
Midfielders:
5	MF	(Wales) WAL	Sophie Ingle	23	4	15	4	3	0	5	0
7	MF	(England) ENG	Jessica Carter	15	1	1+7	1	2	0	5	0
10	MF	(South Korea) KOR	Ji So-yun	19	7	12+1	6	2	0	3+1	1
11	MF	(Norway) NOR	Guro Reiten	24	7	15	5	1+2	1	4+2	1
18	MF	(Norway) NOR	Maren Mjelde	21	5	14	4	2	0	4+1	1
24	MF	(England) ENG	Drew Spence	23	7	8+7	3	1+1	2	4+2	2
27	MF	(Scotland) SCO	Jamie-Lee Napier	4	0	0+2	0	1	0	0+1	0
31	MF	(England) ENG	Charlotte Fleming	2	0	0	0	1	0	1	0
34	MF	(England) ENG	Charlotte Wardlaw	2	0	0	0	0+1	0	1	0
Forwards:
9	FW	(England) ENG	Beth England	25	21	15	14	1+1	0	7+1	7
14	FW	(England) ENG	Fran Kirby	7	0	2+2	0	1	0	1+1	0
17	FW	(Finland) FIN	Adelina Engman	3	1	1+1	1	0	0	0+1	0
20	FW	(Australia) AUS	Sam Kerr	8	1	3+1	1	1+1	0	2	0
22	FW	(Scotland) SCO	Erin Cuthbert	24	5	12+2	2	2	1	8	2
23	FW	(Switzerland) SUI	Ramona Bachmann	19	1	5+7	1	1+1	0	4+1	0
33	FW	(England) ENG	Lexi Lloyd-Smith	0	0	0	0	0	0	0	0
35	FW	(England) ENG	Emily Murphy	6	4	0+2	1	1	2	0+3	1

- Source: Chelsea F.C.

=== Goalscorers ===
Includes all competitive matches. The list is sorted by squad number when total goals are equal.

As of 27 September 2020

Rank	Pos.	No.	Player	FA WSL	FA Cup	League Cup	Total
1	FW	9	Beth England	14	0	7	21
2	MF	11	(Norway) Guro Reiten	5	1	1	7
2	MF	24	(England) Drew Spence	3	2	2	7
2	MF	10	(South Korea) Ji So-yun	6	0	1	7
5	MF	18	(Norway) Maren Mjelde	4	0	1	5
5	FW	22	(Scotland) Erin Cuthbert	2	1	2	5
7	MF	5	(Wales) Sophie Ingle	4	0	0	4
7	FW	35	(England) Emily Murphy	1	2	1	4
9	DF	16	(Sweden) Magdalena Eriksson	1	0	2	3
10	DF	21	(England) Deanna Cooper	0	0	2	2
11	DF	2	(Norway) Maria Thorisdottir	1	0	0	1
11	DF	3	(England) Hannah Blundell	1	0	0	1
11	DF	4	(England) Millie Bright	1	0	0	1
11	MF	7	(England) Jessica Carter	1	0	0	1
11	FW	17	(Finland) Adelina Engman	1	0	0	1
11	FW	20	(Australia) Sam Kerr	1	0	0	1
11	FW	23	(Switzerland) Ramona Bachmann	1	0	0	1
Own goal				0	0	0	0
Total				47	6	19	72

=== Assists ===
Includes all competitive matches. The list is sorted by squad number when total assists are equal.

As of 23 February 2020

Rank	Pos.	No.	Player	FA WSL	FA Cup	League Cup	Total
1	MF	11	(Norway) Guro Reiten	7	0	0	7
1	FW	22	(Scotland) Erin Cuthbert	4	0	3	7
3	FW	9	Beth England	4	0	2	6
4	FW	14	(England) Fran Kirby	3	0	1	4
4	DF	25	(Sweden) Jonna Andersson	4	0	0	4
6	MF	10	(South Korea) Ji So-yun	2	0	1	3
6	FW	23	(Switzerland) Ramona Bachmann	2	0	1	3
6	MF	24	(England) Drew Spence	3	0	0	3
9	MF	5	(Wales) Sophie Ingle	1	1	0	2
9	MF	18	(Norway) Maren Mjelde	1	0	1	2
11	DF	4	(England) Millie Bright	1	0	0	1
11	MF	7	(England) Jessica Carter	1	0	0	1
11	DF	16	(Sweden) Magdalena Eriksson	1	0	0	1
11	FW	20	(Australia) Sam Kerr	1	0	0	1
11	DF	21	(England) Deanna Cooper	0	1	0	1
11	MF	27	(Scotland) Jamie-Lee Napier	0	0	1	1
11	MF	35	(England) Charlotte Fleming	0	1	0	1
Total				35	3	10	48

=== Clean sheets ===
Includes all competitive matches. The list is sorted by squad number when total clean sheets are equal.

As of 17 February 2020

Rank	Pos.	No.	Player	FA WSL	FA Cup	League Cup	Total
1	GK	28	(England) Carly Telford	2	1	3	6
2	GK	30	(Germany) Ann-Katrin Berger	4	1	0	5
Total				6	2	3	11

== Awards ==
No.	Pos.	Player/Manager	Award	Source
—	—	(England) Emma Hayes	FA WSL Manager of the Month (October)	
—	—	(England) Emma Hayes	FA WSL Manager of the Month (January)	
—	—	(England) Emma Hayes	FA WSL Manager of the Month (February)	
—	—	(England) Emma Hayes	BBC WSL Manager of the Season	
—	—	(England) Emma Hayes	FA WSL Manager of the Season	
—	—	(England) Emma Hayes	LMA Manager of the Year	
4	DF	(England) Millie Bright	FA WSL Player of the Month (November)	
4	DF	(England) Millie Bright	PFA WSL Team of the Year	
5	MF	(Wales) Sophie Ingle	The Athletic's Team of the Year	
9	FW	Bethany England	FA WSL Player of the Month (January)	
9	FW	Bethany England	FA WSL Player of the Month (February)	
9	FW	Bethany England	The Athletic's Player of the Year	
9	FW	Bethany England	The Athletic's Team of the Year	
9	FW	Bethany England	FA WSL Player of the Season	
9	FW	Bethany England	PFA Women's Players' Player of the Year	
9	FW	Bethany England	PFA WSL Team of the Year	
10	MF	(South Korea) Ji So-yun	PFA WSL Team of the Year	
11	MF	(Norway) Guro Reiten	The Athletic's Team of the Year	
16	DF	(Sweden) Magdalena Eriksson	The Athletic's Team of the Year	
16	DF	(Sweden) Magdalena Eriksson	PFA WSL Team of the Year	
18	DF	(Norway) Maren Mjelde	The Athletic's Team of the Year	
18	DF	(Norway) Maren Mjelde	PFA WSL Team of the Year	
30	GK	(Germany) Ann-Katrin Berger	PFA WSL Team of the Year	
