= 2020 FA Women's League Cup final =

Ninth edition of FA Women's League Cup Final

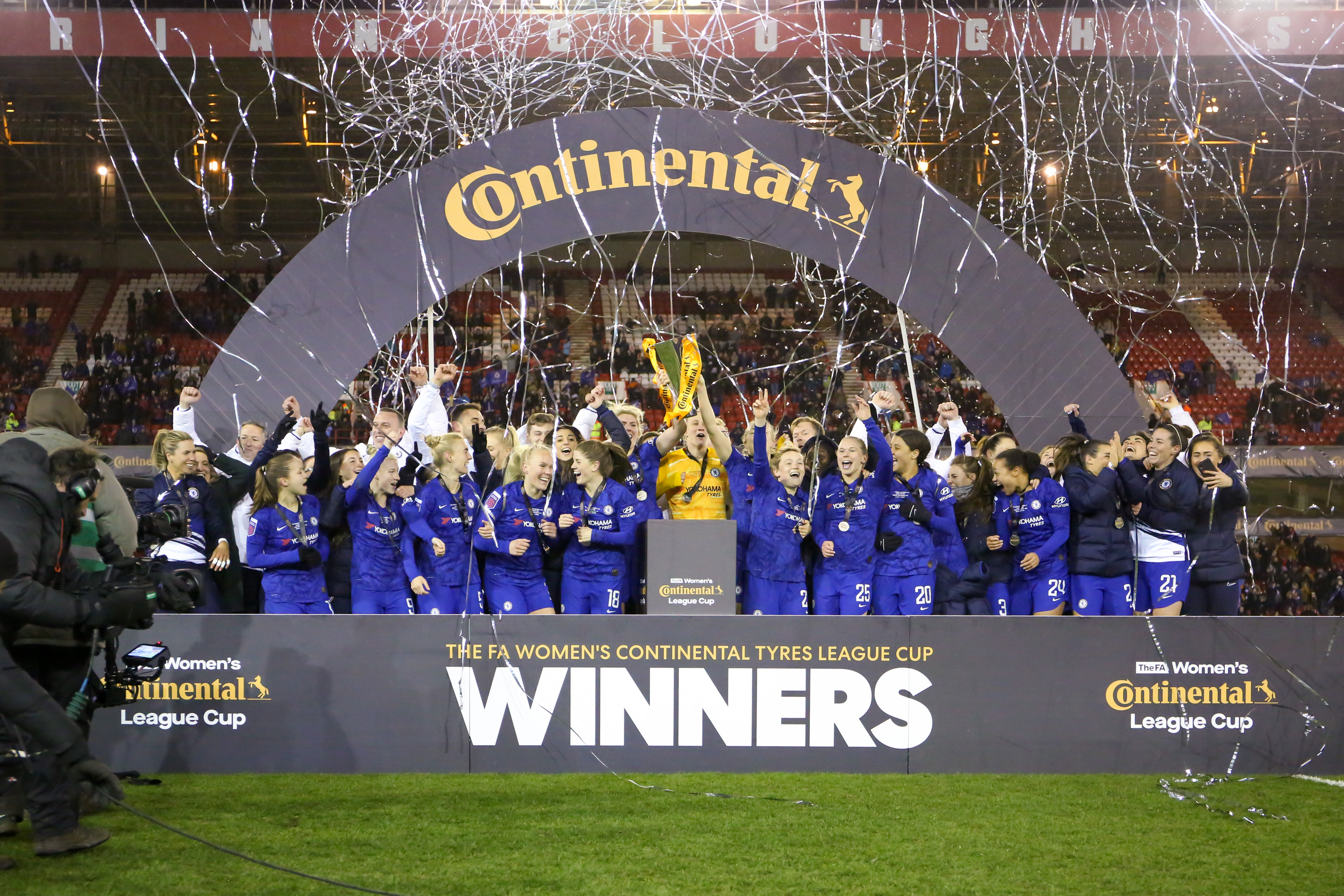
- Event: 2019–20 FA Women's League Cup
Arsenal	Chelsea
1	2
- Date: 29 February 2020
- Venue: City Ground, West Bridgford, Nottinghamshire
- Player of the Match: Ann-Katrin Berger (Chelsea)
- Referee: Helen Conley
- Attendance: 6,743

The 2020 FA Women's League Cup final was the ninth final of the FA Women's League Cup, England's secondary cup competition for women's football teams and its primary League Cup tournament. It took place on 29 February 2020 at the City Ground, and was contested by Arsenal and Chelsea.

Arsenal had competed in all but one (2016) of the previous finals, winning five. Chelsea made their first appearance in a League Cup final having been a losing semi-finalist at the hands of Manchester City in each of the last two seasons.

== Route to the final ==
Round	Opposition	Score
GS	London City Lionesses (A)	5–0
GS	Charlton Athletic (H)	4–0
GS	Brighton & Hove Albion (A)	0–0 (p)
GS	Bristol City (H)	7–0
GS	London Bees (H)	9–0
QF	Reading (H)	1–0
SF	Manchester City (H)	2–1
Key: (H) = Home venue; (A) = Away venue.

=== Arsenal ===
Arsenal topped their League Cup Group for the second consecutive season, doing so by winning four of their five games; against second-tier teams London City Lionesses, Charlton Athletic and London Bees as well as FA WSL relegation battlers Bristol City. The only team to stop Arsenal from winning in the Group Stage was fellow WSL side Brighton & Hove Albion who earned themselves a goalless draw before the Seagulls also took the extra available point by winning the ensuing penalty shootout 4–2. Arsenal finished the Group Stage without conceding a goal.

The quarter-finals saw Arsenal drawn at home to Reading as their strong defensive record continued, seeing off the midtable WSL side 1–0 thanks to a late Kim Little strike. The semi-final matched Arsenal against defending League Cup champions and fellow WSL title-challengers Manchester City. A 2–0 Arsenal lead at half-time was halved in the 60th minute as Gemma Bonner scored the first goal Arsenal had conceded in the competition but the Gunners held on for the win, sending them to their third consecutive final.

Round	Opposition	Score
GS	West Ham United (H)	2–0
GS	Crystal Palace (A)	3–0
GS	Lewes (A)	2–1
GS	Tottenham Hotspur (H)	5–1
GS	Reading (A)	1–1 (p)
QF	Aston Villa (H)	3–1
SF	Manchester United (A)	1–0
Key: (H) = Home venue; (A) = Away venue.

=== Chelsea ===
Chelsea topped their League Cup Group for the third consecutive season, and, like Arsenal, progressed with 13 points after winning four of the five games and drawing a fifth before losing the penalty shootout. They beat two WSL teams and two second-tier teams by way of West Ham United, Tottenham Hotspur, Crystal Palace and Lewes before Reading forced a 1–1 draw. The Royals won the extra point 4–2 on penalties.

In the quarter-finals, Chelsea were drawn at home to Aston Villa, one of two Championship teams to progress to the knockout stage. Chelsea ran out comfortable 3–1 winners. The Blues' place in their first League Cup final was ultimately assured by a sole Maren Mjelde goal as Chelsea once again narrowly beat newly-promoted Manchester United 1–0 in the semi-final, a repeat of the scoreline when the teams had first met in the league in November 2019.

== Match ==
=== Details ===
29 February 2020
17:30 GMT (UTC+00:00)

Arsenal	1–2	Chelsea
Williamson 85'	Report	England 8', 90+2'

City Ground, West Bridgford, Nottinghamshire
Attendance: 6,743
Referee: Helen Conley

Arsenal	Chelsea

GK	1	(Austria) Manuela Zinsberger
LB	15	(Republic of Ireland) Katie McCabe	(yellow card) 81'
LCB	22	(Austria) Viktoria Schnaderbeck
RCB	16	(Republic of Ireland) Louise Quinn
RB	17	(Scotland) Lisa Evans
LW	8	(England) Jordan Nobbs (c)
LCM	14	(Netherlands) Jill Roord
RCM	6	(England) Leah Williamson
RW	19	(Australia) Caitlin Foord
CAM	7	(Netherlands) Daniëlle van de Donk
FW	11	(Netherlands) Vivianne Miedema
Substitutes:
GK	18	(France) Pauline Peyraud-Magnin
MF	20	(Germany) Leonie Maier
MF	26	(England) Ruby Grant
MF	27	(Republic of Ireland) Melisa Filis
DF	30	(England) Ruby Mace
Manager:
(Australia) Joe Montemurro

GK	30	(Germany) Ann-Katrin Berger
LB	25	(Sweden) Jonna Andersson
LCB	16	(Sweden) Magdalena Eriksson (c)	(yellow card) 59'
RCB	4	(England) Millie Bright
RB	18	(Norway) Maren Mjelde
LW	11	(Norway) Guro Reiten
LCM	10	(South Korea) Ji So-yun		(substituted off) 75'
RCM	5	(Wales) Sophie Ingle
RW	22	(Scotland) Erin Cuthbert	(yellow card) 77'
FW	20	(Australia) Sam Kerr		(substituted off) 90+3'
FW	9	Bethany England
Substitutes:
GK	28	(England) Carly Telford
DF	2	(Norway) Maria Thorisdottir		(substituted on) 75'
DF	3	(England) Hannah Blundell
MF	7	(England) Jessica Carter
DF	21	(England) Deanna Cooper
FW	23	(Switzerland) Ramona Bachmann
MF	24	(Jamaica) Drew Spence		(substituted on) 90+3'
Manager:
(England) Emma Hayes

Player of the match:
Ann-Katrin Berger (Chelsea)

Match officials

Assistant referees:
Helen Edwards
Magda Golba

Fourth official:
Stacey Pearson

Match rules

- 90 minutes.
- 30 minutes of extra-time if necessary.
- Penalty shoot-out if scores still level.
- Seven named substitutes.
- Maximum of three substitutions.
