= Diane Caldwell =

Irish footballer (born 1988)

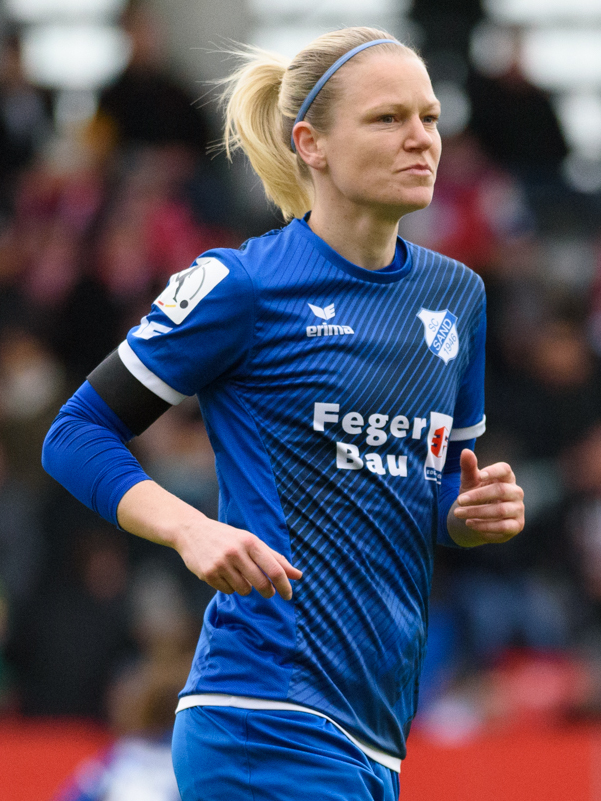
- Caldwell playing for SC Sand in 2020

Personal information
- Full name: Diane Evelyn Caldwell
- Date of birth: 11 September 1988 (age 38)
- Place of birth: Balbriggan, Republic of Ireland
- Height: 5 ft 8 in (1.73 m)
- Positions: Defender; midfielder

Team information
- Current team: Zürich
- Number: 3

College career
Years	Team	Apps	(Gls)
2006–2009	Hofstra Pride	76	(8)

Senior career*
Years	Team	Apps	(Gls)
- Balbriggan FC
2006	Raheny United		
2010	Hudson Valley Quickstrike		
2011	Albany Alleycats		
2011	Þór/KA	7	(1)
2012–2015	Avaldsnes IL	57	(5)
2016	1. FC Köln	6	(0)
2016–2020	SC Sand	93	(2)
2021	North Carolina Courage	7	(0)
2022	Manchester United	5	(0)
2022–2023	Reading	6	(0)
2023–	Zürich	12	(1)

International career^{‡}
2002–2004	Republic of Ireland U17		
2004–2006	Republic of Ireland U19		
2006–2025	Republic of Ireland	101	(4)
- * Club domestic league appearances and goals as of 17:25, 3 March 2024 (UTC) ‡ National team caps and goals as of 3 November 2023

Diane Evelyn Caldwell (born 11 September 1988) is an Irish professional footballer who plays as a defender for FC Zürich Frauen and the Republic of Ireland national team.

Having played in her native Ireland with Raheny United, Caldwell moved to the United States to play collegiately at Hofstra University in 2006. She went on to play in three American leagues: the USL W-League with Hudson Valley Quickstrike, Women's Premier Soccer League with Albany Alleycats and National Women's Soccer League with North Carolina Courage. Caldwell has also played in Iceland for Þór/KA, in Norway with Avaldsnes IL, for German clubs 1. FC Köln and SC Sand, and in England with Manchester United and Reading and FC Zürich Frauen

== Early life ==
Born in Balbriggan, County Dublin, Caldwell attended Mount Temple Comprehensive School and played for local club Balbriggan FC. In January 2006, she moved to Raheny United of the Dublin Women's Soccer League.

=== College career ===
In autumn 2006, Caldwell enrolled at Hofstra University and played four seasons for Hofstra Pride while studying for a bachelor's in physical education teaching. She played in 15 games in her debut year including 14 starts, scoring once, the tying goal late in a 2–1 comeback win over Fordham. She was named to the Colonial Athletic Association All-Rookie team. In 2007, Hofstra won the CAA Tournament title with a 1–0 win over VCU Rams. Caldwell assisted the game-winner in the final. In total, Caldwell made 76 appearances and scored eight goals.

Having exhausted her college eligibility for football, Caldwell returned to Hofstra to study for a master's in sports science in 2010. She tried out for the field hockey team in spring, eventually earning a place for the 2010 season. She had previously played hockey as a teenager and was offered a trial for Leinster but declined to focus on football.

== Club career ==
In 2011, Caldwell was named to the preseason roster of Women's Professional Soccer (WPS) franchise magicJack but did not sign for the team. Instead, Caldwell played for Albany Alleycats in the Women's Premier Soccer League (WPSL) in 2011 before joining Icelandic Úrvalsdeild team Þór/KA to finish the 2011 campaign. She scored two goals in eight appearances in all competitions including in a Champions League round of 32 match against Turbine Potsdam.

=== Avaldsnes ===
Ahead of the 2012 season, Caldwell moved to Avaldsnes IL of the Norwegian 1. divisjon. She played in 20 of 22 league games as Avaldsnes finished top and won promotion to the Toppserien. In the following three seasons, Avaldsnes retained their Toppserien status with 4th, 5th and 2nd-place finishes with the latter qualifying the team for the UEFA Women's Champions League for the first time, and also reached two Norwegian Women's Cup finals: losing both the 2013 final 1–0 to Stabæk and 3–2 to LSK Kvinner in 2015. With the owner heavily investing in the club including bringing in national team players from Norway, Sweden, Iceland and Brazil, Caldwell faced heavy competition for her place in the squad during the 2015 season. Under the new management of Tom Nordlie, Caldwell was limited to four appearances in 2015 and decided to leave at the end of the season: "At that time, a new coach had come in. I was working really hard to try to prove him wrong, but he obviously didn't fancy me as a player, didn't give me a chance." In total she played 66 games for Avaldsnes and scored eight goals.

=== 1. FC Köln ===
In January 2016, Caldwell joined 2015–16 Frauen-Bundesliga strugglers 1. FC Köln on a short-term deal as the club looked to bolster in a bid to stave off relegation. However, Caldwell played in six matches, all defeats, as Köln dropped out of the league.

=== SC Sand ===
She left at the end of the season, opting to remain in the Bundesliga with SC Sand following a successful trial with the club. She made 24 appearances in all competitions in her first season with the club including in the 2017 DFB-Pokal Final as Sand lost 2–1 to Wolfsburg for the second consecutive final. She cited her spell at SC Sand, particularly under Colin Bell who signed her for Sand and would later manage the Irish national team, as a rejuvenating experience following tough periods with Avaldsnes and Köln. Bell most notably took Caldwell from being a versatile utility player in midfield and at full-back, and told her to focus playing at centre-back. During the COVID-19 pandemic with Germany in a lockdown and the Bundesliga still suspended, Caldwell and her Sand teammates volunteered as farm labourers to pick asparagus and strawberries to cover for the migrant worker shortage. In August 2020, Caldwell was named captain in place of the departing Anne van Bonn ahead of the 2020–21 season. Caldwell left SC Sand midway through the season to pursue another playing opportunity.

=== North Carolina Courage ===
On 19 January 2021, Caldwell returned to the United States to join North Carolina Courage of the National Women's Soccer League, signing a one-year contract with an additional option year. In December 2021, North Carolina declined Caldwell's contract option at the end of the season. She had made eight appearances for the club.

=== Manchester United ===
On 27 January 2022, Caldwell signed a short-term contract with Women's Super League club Manchester United for the remainder of the 2021–22 season. She made six appearances in all competitions before leaving the club at the end of her contract on 30 June 2022.

=== Reading ===
On 11 August 2022, Caldwell signed with Reading of the English Women's Super League.

== International career ==
Caldwell made her Republic of Ireland under-17 debut at 14-years-old. She appeared during qualifying cycles for the 2005 and 2006 UEFA Women's Under-19 Championship, earning 18 caps up to under-19 level by 2005.

On 15 March 2006, Caldwell made her senior Republic of Ireland debut at the age of 17, appearing in a 4–0 defeat to Denmark in the 2006 Algarve Cup. Her first competitive appearance came later that month, in a 2–0 2007 FIFA World Cup qualifying defeat by Switzerland at Gurzelen Stadion.

Having agreed with Hofstra to be released for any international call-ups, either under-19 or senior, Caldwell was frozen out of international contention by manager Noel King after he threatened to leave her out if she didn't attend the 2009 World Student Games in July 2009, something Hofstra had not agreed on as an unofficial non-FIFA competition.

She was not recalled until King was replaced by Susan Ronan who named Caldwell in her first squad, a friendly against Switzerland in August 2011. Caldwell scored her first senior international goal on 6 March 2013 in a 5–1 win over Northern Ireland in the 2013 Cyprus Women's Cup, her 21st cap and her first playing in the number seven shirt following the retirement of Ciara Grant the previous month.

In Autumn 2021 Ireland coach Vera Pauw dropped Caldwell from the starting line-up in favour of Savannah McCarthy but insisted that Caldwell remained an important player: "It doesn’t mean she's out forever, she's a very good player Diane Caldwell, and I've huge respect for her. But we are professionals and we need to win games." Caldwell captained Ireland for the first time on 19 February 2022, in a 1–0 defeat by Russia at the 2022 Pinatar Cup.

On 27 October 2023, Caldwell earned her 100th cap for Ireland in a 5–1 victory over Albania.

== Career statistics ==
=== Club ===
As of 16 March 2022.

Appearances and goals by club, season and competition
Club	Season	League			National cup		League cup		Continental		Total	
Club	Season	Division	Apps	Goals	Apps	Goals	Apps	Goals	Apps	Goals	Apps	Goals
Þór/KA	2011	Úrvalsdeild	7	1	0	0	—		2	1	9	2
Avaldsnes IL	2012	1. divisjon	20	1	2	1	—		—		22	2
Avaldsnes IL	2013	Toppserien	13	2	4	1	—		—		17	3
Avaldsnes IL	2014	Toppserien	20	2	3	1	—		—		23	3
Avaldsnes IL	2015	Toppserien	4	0	0	0	—		—		4	0
Avaldsnes IL	Total		57	5	9	3	0	0	0	0	66	8
1. FC Köln	2015–16	Frauen-Bundesliga	6	0	0	0	—		—		6	0
SC Sand	2016–17	Frauen-Bundesliga	19	1	5	0	—		—		24	1
SC Sand	2017–18	Frauen-Bundesliga	22	0	3	0	—		—		25	0
SC Sand	2018–19	Frauen-Bundesliga	21	1	2	0	—		—		23	1
SC Sand	2019–20	Frauen-Bundesliga	21	0	3	0	—		—		24	0
SC Sand	2020–21	Frauen-Bundesliga	10	0	1	0	—		—		11	0
SC Sand	Total		93	2	14	0	0	0	0	0	107	2
North Carolina Courage	2021	NWSL	7	0	1	0	0	0	—		8	0
Manchester United	2021–22	WSL	5	0	1	0	0	0	—		6	0
Reading	2022–23	WSL	6	0	0	0	1	0	—		7	0
Career total			181	8	25	3	1	0	2	1	209	12

=== International ===
Appearances and goals by national team and year
National team	Year	Apps	Goals
Republic of Ireland	2006	8	0
Republic of Ireland	2007	4	0
Republic of Ireland	2011	1	0
Republic of Ireland	2012	7	0
Republic of Ireland	2013	7	1
Republic of Ireland	2014	9	0
Republic of Ireland	2015	8	0
Republic of Ireland	2016	8	0
Republic of Ireland	2017	10	0
Republic of Ireland	2018	7	0
Republic of Ireland	2019	5	0
Republic of Ireland	2020	5	2
Republic of Ireland	2021	6	0
Republic of Ireland	2022	7	0
Republic of Ireland	2023	3	0
Total		95	3

As of 11 March 2020. Ireland score listed first, score column indicates score after each Caldwell goal.

No.	Cap	Date	Venue	Opponent	Score	Result	Competition
1	21	6 March 2013	Tasos Markou, Paralimni, Cyprus	Northern Ireland	1–0	5–1	2013 Cyprus Cup
2	75	5 March 2020	Tallaght Stadium, Dublin, Ireland	Greece	1–0	1–0	UEFA Euro 2021 qualification
3	76	11 March 2020	Stadion pod Malim brdom, Budva, Montenegro	Montenegro	1–0	3–0	UEFA Euro 2021 qualification

== Honours ==
Hofstra Pride

- Colonial Athletic Association Tournament: 2007

Avaldsnes IL

- 1. divisjon: 2012

Zurich

- Swiss Women's Super League: 2022–23
