= Bethany England =

English footballer (born 1994)

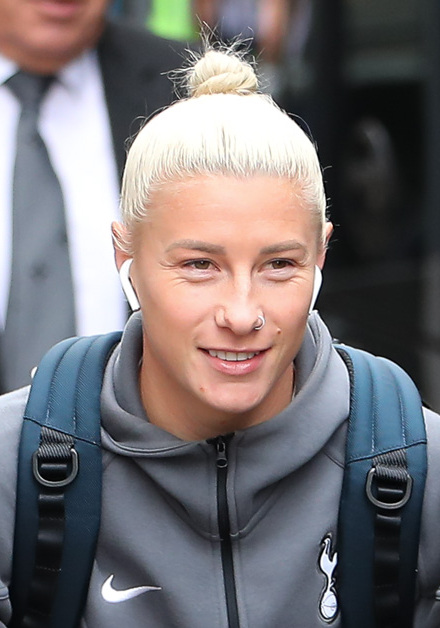
- Bethany England in 2024

Personal information
- Full name: Bethany England
- Date of birth: 3 June 1994 (age 32)
- Place of birth: Barnsley, England
- Height: 1.66 m (5 ft 5 in)
- Positions: Forward; midfielder

Team information
- Current team: Crystal Palace

Youth career
- Sheffield United

Senior career*
Years	Team	Apps	(Gls)
2011–2015	Doncaster Rovers Belles	79	(28)
2011	→ Sheffield Wednesday (loan)	4	(2)
2016–2023	Chelsea	99	(45)
2017–2018	→ Liverpool (loan)	16	(10)
2023–2026	Tottenham Hotspur	66	(32)
2026–	Crystal Palace	3	(1)

International career^{‡}
2011–2012	England U19	8	(5)
2015–2017	England U23	12	(4)
2019–2023	England	26	(11)
Medal record
Women's football
Representing England
UEFA Women's Championship
Winner	2022 England
FIFA Women's World Cup
Runner-up	2023 Australia and New Zealand
- * Club domestic league appearances and goals as of 14:39, 17 May 2026 (UTC) ‡ National team caps and goals as of 20 August 2023

Bethany England (born 3 June 1994) is an English professional footballer who plays as a forward for Women's Super League club Crystal Palace.

She previously played for Doncaster Rovers Belles, Liverpool, Chelsea, and Tottenham Hotspur, and represented England on the U19 and U23 national teams. She has earned 26 appearances for the England national team.

In 2020, England was named the league's Player of the Year and PFA Women's Players' Player of the Year after leading Chelsea to win the 2019–20 FA WSL and 2019–20 FA League Cup. She was also named to the PFA Team of the Year.

== Early life ==
England was born and raised with her two sisters in Barnsley, a large market and college town in South Yorkshire, between Leeds and Sheffield. She began playing with a boys' team around age six and played with the team for 3–4 years. A plaque honouring England, as part of the "Where Greatness Is Made" campaign, was installed at Junior Tykes F.C. in Barnsley in 2022. She was later scouted to join the Sheffield United girls' centre of excellence. After three years with the Sheffield United girls' team, England began playing for the Sheffield United academy at age 13 where she played for three years along with her twin sister, Laura. At 16, England joined Doncaster Belles and broke onto the first team within her first year.

England attended Barnsley Sixth Form College. At Barnsley College, her former football coaches remember her scoring the best goal many of them had ever seen at the Whitsuntide Tournament in Spain. Mark Ryan, manager of the college's sport academy, noted, "The goalkeeper kicked the ball from the edge of the box. As the ball travelled towards the halfway line, Beth stood wide right. She watched the ball come over her left shoulder and she hit it, first time, from just inside the opposition half. Lobbed the goalkeeper. There were 28 boys on the sideline, and their reaction... It went from stunned silence to absolute uproar.”

England studied law part-time through a partnership with BPP University and the Doncaster Belles organization with the goal of pursuing family law. As a youth, she admired footballers Steven Gerrard and Rachel Yankey.

== Club career ==
=== Doncaster Rovers Belles ===
==== 2011–2015 ====
Everyone's journey is different. Mine has neither been easy, nor it has just been a long old roll.

— Bethany England, BBC Sport

At the age of 17, England established herself in Doncaster Rovers Belles' first team during the second half of the 2011 FA WSL season. She made her debut for the first team on 23 July 2011 and made four appearances during the regular season. Doncaster finished in seventh place with a 2–9–3 record. In October 2011, she went on a short-term loan to Sheffield Wednesday.

During the 2012 FA WSL season, England scored two goals in her eight appearances. She scored her first goal during a 3–2 loss to Bristol City. Her second goal came during a 2–0 win over Liverpool. Doncaster finished in seventh place with a 3–9–2 record. Returning to Doncaster England made nine appearances during the 2012 FA WSL season. The team finished in last place and was relegated to the second division, FA WSL 2, for the 2014 season.

During the 2015 FA WSL season, England's 14 goals helped the club finish second during the regular season with a 14–1–3 and gain promotion to FA WSL 1. She scored a brace against Oxford United. Over her five seasons with Doncaster, England became a regular starter and made close to 100 appearances for the club. Though offered a full-time deal by the Belles, England opted to join Chelsea the following season.

=== Chelsea ===
==== 2016–17 season ====
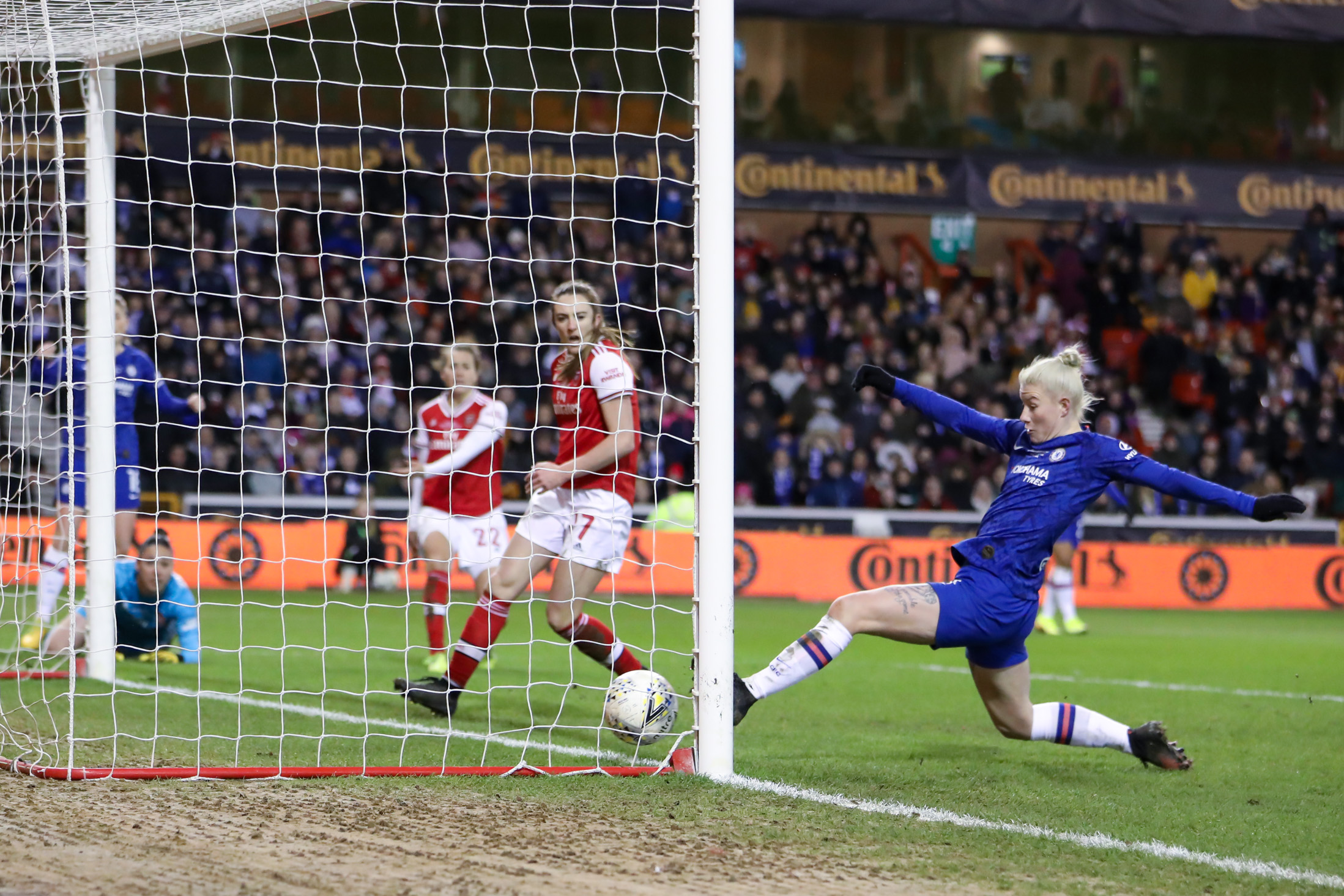
England scoring the game-winning goal against Arsenal in the 2020 FA Women's League Cup Final.

In January 2016, it was announced that England had signed with reigning FA WSL 1 champions Chelsea for the 2016 season. She scored 5 times in her 19 appearances, including seven starts, playing as a wing-back. Chelsea finished second during the regular season with a 12–3–1 record.

In April 2017, England signed a new two-year contract with Chelsea. A few months later she was loaned to Liverpool for the season where she strengthened her goal-scoring skills with 10 goals in 16 matches.

==== 2017–18 season: Loan to Liverpool ====
On 14 September 2017, England moved on loan to Liverpool for the 2017–18 FA WSL season. On 12 October 2017, she scored her first goal for the Reds in a 6–0 victory against Sheffield F.C. in the Continental Cup. In February 2018, she scored another goal in Liverpool's 3–1 win against Sunderland. England's 10 goals ranked third on the team for the season. Liverpool finished sixth during the regular season with a 9–8–1 record.

==== 2018–2023: Return to Chelsea and breakthrough ====
She returned to Chelsea for the 2018–19 FA WSL season. Her 12 goals in 18 matches ranked third in the league and first on Chelsea's squad. Chelsea finished third during the regular season with a 12–2–6 record.

During the 2019–20 FA WSL season, England scored 14 goals in 15 games. Named Player of the Month for January and February, she was the country's top scorer in all competitions across the top two divisions, and the Super League's second-highest goalscorer. Her brace during the Continental Cup Final secured Chelsea's win. Chelsea manager Emma Hayes called her the best English No 9 in the country. England scored 21 goals in all competitions for the Women's Super League and Continental Cup and was named the league's Player of the Season.

In July 2020, England signed a new four-year contract with Chelsea. Chelsea's general manager Paul Green noted, "We're delighted to have extended Beth's contract, as she has been outstanding in the last 18 months, playing a big part in the team's success. We feel that she is now coming in to her peak as a player and look forward to seeing how she continues to develop for both club and country in the upcoming years." In August, she helped Chelsea win the 2020 FA Community Shield after a 2–0 win over Manchester City.

=== Tottenham Hotspur ===
On 4 January 2023, it was announced that England had signed for Tottenham Hotspur until June 2026. Her transfer fee was reported to be £250,000, breaking the record for a domestic women's football transfer. On 15 September 2023, it was announced that England would become the team captain.

England had hip surgery in September 2023. It is unclear when she sustained the injury but the surgery recovery meant she missed the beginning of the 2023–24 Super League season.

On 14 January 2024, England scored twice within 11 minutes (her first goals since her injury) to help Tottenham fight back after going 2–0 down to Sheffield United in the FA Cup Fourth Round. Tottenham came away 3–2 victors in that game. Later that season, in the FA Cup Quarter-Final, England scored a 96th minute equaliser against Manchester City. A 1–1 draw saw the game go to penalties: England took the first penalty for her team, converting it, to help Tottenham to an eventual 1–1 (4–3) win. Her first goal of the 2023–24 league came in the second minute of the 1–0 away victory against Bristol City.

On 30 April 2026, it was announced that England would depart Tottenham upon the expiry of her contract in the summer of 2026.

=== Crystal Palace ===
On 15 July 2026, England was announced at Crystal Palace. On 27 September 2026, England scored her first league goal for Crystal Palace, becoming the second player to score 90 career goals in the Women's Super League.

== International career ==
=== Youth ===
England has represented her country on the under-19, under-23, and senior national teams. In 2012, she competed with the under-19 national team at the UEFA Under-19 Championship in Turkey. She scored two goals in five appearances. The team finished third in their group, but did not advance to the Final Stages.

=== Senior ===
In August 2019, England earned her first senior England call up for friendlies against Belgium and Norway. In October 2019, she scored her first goal as a substitute in a 2–1 defeat to Brazil. She scored the game-opening goal in a 3–2 win over Czech Republic an assist from Nikita Parris a month later. In February 2020, she was named to the England squad for the SheBelieves Cup in the United States. England manager Phil Neville said of the call-up, "She's playing in a team full of confidence and every time I see her play, she's added a little bit to the game. Without doubt she, along with Ellen White, are the best two centre-forwards in England on form and she deserves her place in the squad." England made two appearances during the tournament and the team finished third. She sustained an ankle injury during training that prevented her from playing in the team's final match. In June 2022 she was included in the England squad which won the UEFA Euro 2022.

On 31 May 2023, England was named to the squad for the 2023 FIFA World Cup in July 2023. She was brought on as a substitute in the Lionesses' 1–0 loss against Spain in the tournament's final. England has been awarded Legacy number 213 by The Football Association.

== Personal life ==
On 7 June 2025, England married Welsh footballer Stephanie Williams.

== Statistics ==
=== Club ===
As of match played 16 May 2026

Appearances and goals by club, season and competition
Club	Season	League			FA Cup		League Cup (Note: includes Women's League Cup)		Continental (Note: includes UEFA Women's Champions League)		Other		Total	
Club	Season	Division	Apps	Goals	Apps	Goals	Apps	Goals	Apps	Goals	Apps	Goals	Apps	Goals
Doncaster Rover Belles	2011	Women's Super League	4	0	1	0	—		—		—		5	0
Doncaster Rover Belles	2012	Women's Super League	8	2	3	0	—		—		—		11	2
Doncaster Rover Belles	2013	Women's Super League	9	0	3	1	—		—		—		12	1
Doncaster Rover Belles	2014	Women's Super League 2	18	8	5	2	—		—		—		23	10
Doncaster Rover Belles	2015	Women's Super League 2	18	13	5	1	—		—		—		23	14
Doncaster Rover Belles	Total		57	23	17	4	—		—		—		74	27
Chelsea	2016	Women's Super League	13	3	1	2	—		—		—		14	5
Chelsea	2017	Women's Super League	6	0	—		—		—		—		6	0
Chelsea	2018–19	Women's Super League	18	12	7	7	—		7	0	—		32	19
Chelsea	2019–20	Women's Super League	15	14	2	0	8	7	—		—		25	21
Chelsea	2020–21	Women's Super League	19	6	5	1	4	2	6	3	1	0	35	12
Chelsea	2021–22	Women's Super League	20	8	3	3	2	0	5	1	—		30	12
Chelsea	2022–23	Women's Super League	8	2	—		—		2	0	—		10	2
Chelsea	Total		99	45	18	13	14	9	20	4	1	0	152	71
Liverpool (loan)	2017–18	Women's Super League	16	10	3	1	—		—		—		19	11
Tottenham Hotspur	2022–23	Women's Super League	12	12	1	1	1	0	—		—		14	13
Tottenham Hotspur	2023–24	Women's Super League	14	5	5	3	2	0	—		—		21	8
Tottenham Hotspur	2024–25	Women's Super League	19	8	0	0	4	0	—		—		23	8
Tottenham Hotspur	2025–26	Women's Super League	21	7	3	2	4	0	—		—		28	9
Tottenham Hotspur	Total		66	32	9	6	11	0	0	0	0	0	86	38
Crystal Palace	2026-27	Women's Super League	5	1	—		2	0	—		—		7	1
Career total			243	111	47	24	27	9	20	4	1	0	338	148

=== International ===
Statistics accurate as of match played 20 August 2023.

Appearances and goals by national team and year
National team	Year	Apps	Goals
England	2019	5	2
England	2020	2	0
England	2021	8	6
England	2022	6	3
England	2023	5	0
Total		26	11

As of match played 6 September 2022. England team score listed first, score column indicates score after each Bethany England goal.

International goals by date, venue, opponent, score, result and competition
No.	Date	Venue	Opponent	Score	Result	Competition	Ref.
1	5 October 2019	Riverside Stadium, Middlesbrough, England	Brazil	1–2	1–2	Friendly	
2	12 November 2019	Stadion Střelecký ostrov, České Budějovice, Czech Republic	Czech Republic	1–1	3–2	Friendly	
3	17 September 2021	St Mary's Stadium, Southampton, England	North Macedonia	5–0	8–0	2023 FIFA World Cup qualification	
4	17 September 2021	St Mary's Stadium, Southampton, England	North Macedonia	7–0	8–0	2023 FIFA World Cup qualification	
5	21 September 2021	Stade de Luxembourg, Luxembourg City, Luxembourg	Luxembourg	10–0	10–0	2023 FIFA World Cup qualification	
6	23 October 2021	Wembley, London, England	Northern Ireland	2–0	4–0	2023 FIFA World Cup qualification	
7	30 November 2021	Keepmoat Stadium, Doncaster, England	Latvia	12–0	20–0	2023 FIFA World Cup qualification	
8	30 November 2021	Keepmoat Stadium, Doncaster, England	Latvia	19–0	20–0	2023 FIFA World Cup qualification	
9	30 June 2022	Letzigrund, Zürich, Switzerland	Switzerland	3–0	4–0	Friendly	
10	6 September 2022	Bet365 Stadium, Stoke-on-Trent, England	Luxembourg	6–0	10–0	2023 FIFA World Cup qualification	
11	6 September 2022	Bet365 Stadium, Stoke-on-Trent, England	Luxembourg	10–0	10–0	2023 FIFA World Cup qualification	

== Honours ==
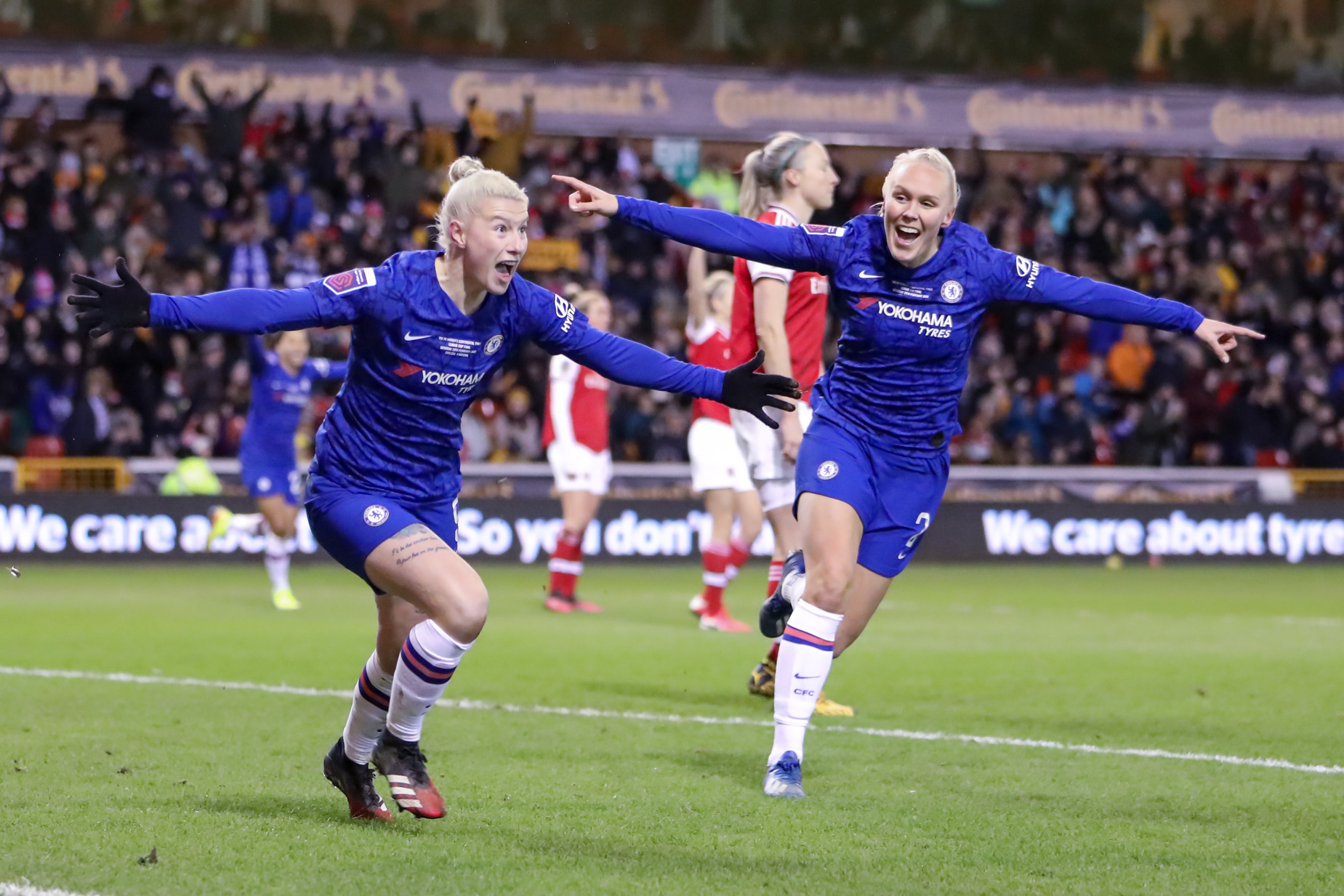
England (left) and Maria Thorisdottir celebrate after England scored the game-winning goal at the 2020 FA Women's League Cup Final against Arsenal

Chelsea

- FA Women's Super League: 2017–18, 2019–20, 2020–21, 2021–22
- FA WSL Spring Series: 2017
- Women's FA Cup: 2017–18, 2021–22
- FA Women's League Cup: 2019–20,2020–21
- FA Women's Community Shield: 2020

Tottenham Hotspur

- Women's FA Cup runner-up: 2023–24

England

- FIFA Women's World Cup runner-up: 2023
- UEFA Women's Championship: 2022

Individual

- FA WSL Player of the Year: 2020
- PFA Women's Players' Player of the Year: 2019–20
- PFA's WSL Team of the Year: 2020
- FA WSL Player of the Month: January 2020, February 2020
- Freedom of the City of London (announced 1 August 2022)

== See also ==
- List of England women's international footballers
- List of FA WSL hat-tricks
