= Deanna Cooper =

English footballer (born 1993)

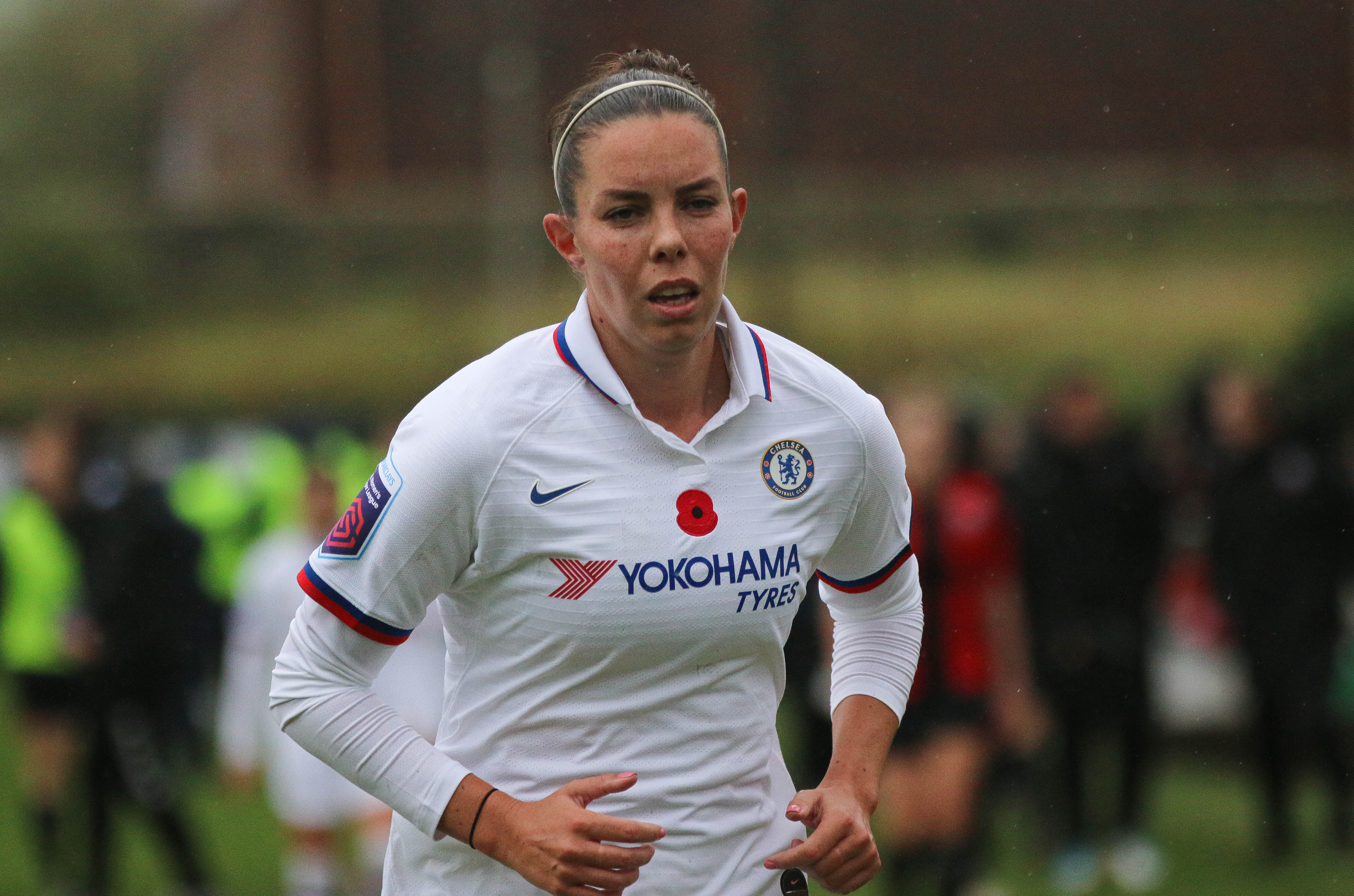
- Deanna Cooper playing for Chelsea F.C. Women in November 2019
- Born: Deanna Rose Cooper; 20 June 1993 (age 33); Chatham, Kent, England
- Height: 173 cm (5 ft 8 in)
Association football career
- Position: Centre-back
Team information
- Current team: Burnley
Senior career*
Years	Team	Apps	(Gls)
2010–2014	Gillingham		
2014–2016	Brighton & Hove Albion		
2016	London Bees		
2017–2020	Chelsea	15	(0)
2020–2024	Reading	68	(3)
2024–2026	Newcastle United	37	(5)
2026–	Burnley	0	(0)
- * Club domestic league appearances and goals as of 12 December 2025
- Cricket career

Cricket information
- Batting: Right-handed
- Bowling: Right-arm medium
- Role: All-rounder

Domestic team information
- Years: Team
- 2008–2016: Kent

Career statistics
Competition	WLA	WT20
Matches	45	30
Runs scored	343	192
Batting average	28.58	16.00
100s/50s	0/2	0/0
Top score	82*	49*
Balls bowled	1,029	189
Wickets	21	8
Bowling average	25.95	27.50
5 wickets in innings	0	0
10 wickets in match	0	0
Best bowling	3/31	3/17
Catches/stumpings	9/–	7/–

Deanna Rose Cooper (born 20 June 1993) is an English professional footballer who plays as a centre-back for Women's Super League 2 club Burnley.

== Football career ==
=== London Bees ===
Cooper played for London Bees during the 2016 FA WSL season. Playing primarily as a centre back defender, she scored 1 goal in her 11 appearances for the club. During the first round of the 2016 FA WSL Cup, she scored an equaliser against former champions Chelsea which resulted in a penalty shootout and win for the Bees.

=== Chelsea ===
Cooper signed with Chelsea in February 2017. Of her signing, she said, "It is a dream of mine to join a pro club so to be here is an amazing feeling. I have worked my way through the ranks and am delighted to have done enough to earn a contract with Chelsea." Cooper was a starting defender in 8 of the 11 matches in the FA WSL Spring Series, helping the team win with a 6–1–1 record.

Ahead of the 2017–18 season, she experienced an ACL injury. In March 2018, she signed a two-year extension with Chelsea.

=== Reading ===
On 17 July 2020, Reading announced the signing of Cooper. On 7 July 2022, Reading announced that Cooper had signed a new two-year contract with the club.

=== Newcastle United ===
On 5 July 2024, Newcastle United announced the signing of Cooper upon the expiration of her contract at Reading.

In June 2026, Newcastle announced that Cooper would depart the club at the end of the 2025–26 WSL 2 season.

=== Burnley ===
In July 2026, Cooper joined Burnley on a two-year contract with the option to extend for a further 12 months.

== Career statistics ==
=== Club ===
As of match played 28 April 2024

Appearances and goals by club, season and competition
Club	Season	League			National Cup		League Cup		Continental		Total	
Club	Season	Division	Apps	Goals	Apps	Goals	Apps	Goals	Apps	Goals	Apps	Goals
Chelsea	2017	Women's Super League	8	0	1	0	0	0	—		9	0
Chelsea	2017–18	Women's Super League	1	0	0	0	0	0	0	0	1	0
Chelsea	2018–19	Women's Super League	5	0	0	0	6	1	1	0	12	1
Chelsea	2019–20	Women's Super League	1	0	1	0	6	2	—		8	2
Chelsea	Total		15	0	2	0	12	3	1	0	30	3
Reading	2020–21	Women's Super League	21	0	1	0	2	0	—		24	0
Reading	2021–22	Women's Super League	17	0	1	0	1	0	—		19	0
Reading	2022–23	Women's Super League	14	1	1	0	2	0	—		17	1
Reading	2023–24	Women's Championship	16	2	1	1	2	0	—		19	3
Reading	Total		68	3	4	1	7	0	—		79	4
Newcastle United	2024-25	Women's Championship	19	3	3	0	1	1	—		23	4
Newcastle United	2025-26	Women's Super League 2	11	1	1	0	2	0	—		14	1
Newcastle United	Total		30	4	4	0	3	1	—		37	5
Career total			113	7	10	1	22	4	1	0	146	12

== Honours ==
Chelsea

- FA WSL: 2017, 2019-20
- FA Women's League Cup: 2019-20

== Cricket career ==
Cooper played cricket for Kent between 2008 and 2016, playing as a right-arm medium bowler and right-handed batter. She also played for England Academy and in the Super Fours. She retired from cricket after sustaining an injury.
