= 2019–20 FA Women's League Cup =

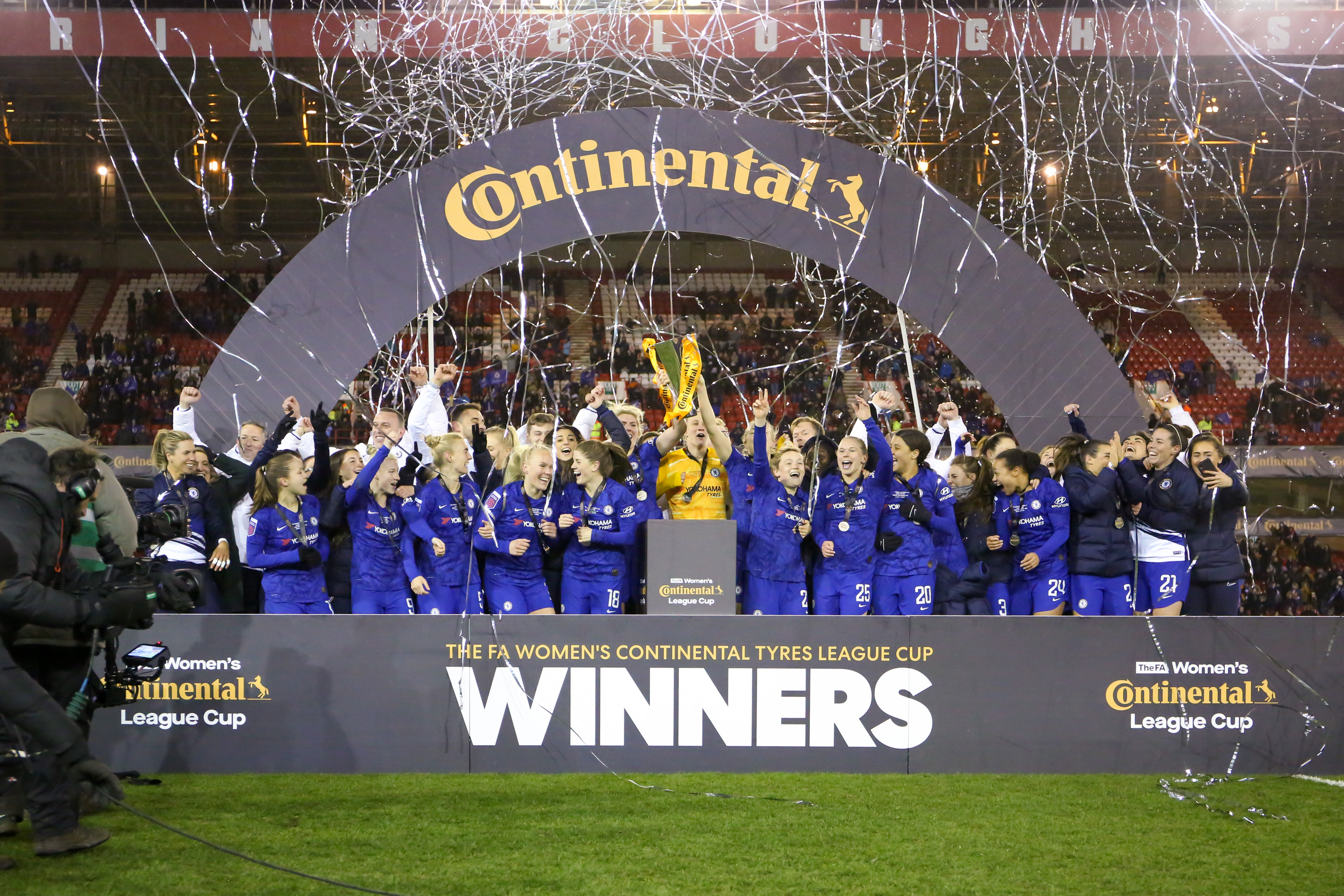

Tournament details
- Country: England
- Dates: 21 September 2019 – 29 February 2020
- Teams: 23

Final positions
- Champions: Chelsea (1st title)
- Runners-up: Arsenal

Tournament statistics
- Matches played: 60
- Goals scored: 242 (4.03 per match)
- Attendance: 45,783 (763 per match)
- Top goal scorer: Bethany England Chelsea (7 Goals)

The 2019–20 FA Women's League Cup was the ninth edition of the FA Women's Super League and FA Women's Championship's league cup competition. It was sponsored by Continental AG, who sponsored the competition since its creation, and was officially known as the FA Women's Continental League Cup for sponsorship reasons. All 23 teams from the FA Women's Super League and FA Women's Championship took part in the competition - the largest field in its history and an increase of one from the previous year.

Manchester City were the defending champions; only they and Arsenal had previously won the cup in the eight seasons it has previously been contested in.

== Format changes ==
The 2019–20 Women's League Cup kept the same format, including an initial group stage, that was in use since the 2017–18 edition, but expanded by one to accommodate the increase in teams in the top two divisions of women's football to 23. The season was intended to be the first in which the FA WSL and FA Championship both had twelve teams, allowing for a league cup group stage with four equal groups of six teams. However, the demotion of Yeovil Town from the WSL to the third tier FA Women's National League meant that, though the competition would have its highest ever number of participants, one group would still have to contain only five clubs.

== Group stage ==
=== Group A ===
Pos	Team	Pld	W	WPEN	LPEN	L	GF	GA	GD	Pts	Qualification	SHU	AST	LIV	DUR	COV	BLB
1	Sheffield United	5	3	0	1	1	14	8	+6	10	Advance to knock-out stage	—	—	—	—	2–2	4–1
2	Aston Villa	5	3	0	1	1	12	8	+4	10	Advance to knock-out stage	3–1	—	2–0	—	—	5–2
3	Liverpool	5	3	0	0	2	16	7	+9	9		2–3	—	—	3–1	—	—
4	Durham	5	3	0	0	2	11	8	+3	9		0–4	3–0	—	—	4–0	—
5	Coventry United	5	0	3	0	2	6	14	−8	6		—	2–2	1–5	—	—	1–1
6	Blackburn Rovers	5	0	0	1	4	5	19	−14	1		—	—	0–6	1–3	—	—

Source: thefa.com
Rules for classification: 1) Points; 2) Goal difference; 3) Number of goals scored; 4) Number of wins; 5) Head-to-head record
22 September 2019

Liverpool	2–3	Sheffield United
Hodson 31'; Charles 62'	Report	Wilkinson 55'; Cusack 87'; Pennock 90+4'

Prenton Park, Birkenhead
Attendance: 687
Referee: Kristian Silcock
22 September 2019

Durham	3–0	Aston Villa
Sharpe 14', 27'; Holmes 65'	Report

New Ferens Park, Durham
Attendance: 359
Referee: Jonny Urwin
22 September 2019

Coventry United	1–1	Blackburn Rovers
Hughes 63'	Report	Stewart 36' (pen.)
Penalties
	4–3

Butts Park Arena, Coventry
Attendance: 245
Referee: Amy Fearn

19 October 2019

Aston Villa	3–1	Sheffield United
Richards 20'; Syme 23'; Hayles 52'	Report	Pennock 69'

Trevor Brown Memorial Ground, Boldmere
Attendance: 405
Referee: Ashley List
20 October 2019

Coventry United	1–5	Liverpool
Axten 15'	Report	Charles 3'; Linnett 5', 30', 43'; Clarke 67'

Butts Park Arena, Coventry
Attendance: 802
20 October 2019

Blackburn Rovers	1–3	Durham
Jordan 31'	Report	Hill 23'; Salicki 78'; Hepple 82'

Sir Tom Finney Stadium, Bamber Bridge
Attendance: 458
Referee: Magdalena Golba

2 November 2019

Aston Villa	2–0	Liverpool
Follis 6'; Syme 86'	Report

Trevor Brown Memorial Ground, Boldmere
Attendance: 355
Referee: Scott Tallis
3 November 2019

Durham	4–0	Coventry United
Hepple 22', 34'; Hill 39'; Manders 85'	Report

New Ferens Park, Durham
Attendance: 321
Referee: Melissa Burgin
3 November 2019

Sheffield United	4–1	Blackburn Rovers
Wilkinson 15' (pen.), 40'; Tierney 53'; Pennock 68'	Report	Jordan 79' (pen.)

Sheffield Olympic Legacy Stadium, Sheffield
Attendance: 248
Referee: Lauren Impey

20 November 2019
19:45
Group stage

Coventry United	2–2	Aston Villa
Hughes 3'; Dermody 33'	Report	Warner 1'; Haywood 50'
Penalties
Worts (penalty scored); Axten (penalty scored); S. Johnson (penalty scored)	3–1	(penalty scored) Ale; (penalty missed) Hutton; (penalty missed) Follis; (penalty missed) M. Johnson

Butts Park Arena, Coventry
Attendance: 286
Referee: Amy Barber
21 November 2019

Durham	0–4	Sheffield United
	Report	Matthews 29'; Palmer 38'; Pennock 64'; Cusack 88'

New Ferens Park, Durham
Referee: Lucy Oliver
21 November 2019

Blackburn Rovers	0–6	Liverpool
	Report	Roberts 10'; Babajide 23'; Lawley 29'; Hodson 35'; Sweetman-Kirk 84'; Kearns 87'

Sir Tom Finney Stadium, Bamber Bridge
Attendance: 392
Referee: Edward Duckworth

11 December 2019

Liverpool	3–1	Durham
Babajide 9', 37'; Charles 43'	Report	Sharpe 58'

Prenton Park, Birkenhead
Attendance: 215
Referee: Dale Baines
11 December 2019

Sheffield United	2–2	Coventry United
Wilkinson 67', 87'	Report	O'Brien 31'; Dermody 65'
Penalties
	1–2

SMH Group Stadium, Chesterfield
Referee: Jack Hall
11 December 2019

Aston Villa	5–2	Blackburn Rovers
Welsh 4'; Greengrass 12'; Hayles 49'; West 54'; Johnson 63'	Report	Stewart 31'; Thomas 57'

Trevor Brown Memorial Ground, Boldmere
Attendance: 183
Referee: Andrew Humphries

=== Group B ===
Pos	Team	Pld	W	WPEN	LPEN	L	GF	GA	GD	Pts	Qualification	ARS	BHA	BRI	LON	CHA	LCL
1	Arsenal	5	4	0	1	0	25	0	+25	13	Advance to knock-out stage	—	—	7–0	9–0	4–0	—
2	Brighton & Hove Albion	5	3	1	0	1	13	4	+9	11	Advance to knock-out stage	0–0	—	1–2	—	—	—
3	Bristol City	5	3	0	1	1	11	11	0	10		—	—	—	3–0	—	1–1
4	London Bees	5	1	1	0	3	3	17	−14	5		—	0–5	—	—	0–0	—
5	Charlton Athletic	5	1	0	1	3	3	12	−9	4		—	0–3	2–5	—	—	1–0
6	London City Lionesses	5	0	1	0	4	3	14	−11	2		0–5	2–4	—	0–3	—	—

Rules for classification: 1) Points; 2) Goal difference; 3) Number of goals scored; 4) Number of wins; 5) Head-to-head record
22 September 2019

Charlton Athletic	0–3	Brighton & Hove Albion
		Umotong 44'; Green 66' (pen.), 88' (pen.)

The Oakwood, Crayford
22 September 2019

London City Lionesses	0–5	Arsenal
	Report	Mead 28', 57', 79'; Roord 33'; Mitchell 54'

Princes Park, Dartford
Attendance: 577
Referee: Jacob Miles
22 September 2019

Bristol City	3–0	London Bees
Humphrey 7'; Salmon 15'; Harrison 90'	Report

Stoke Gifford Stadium, Filton
Attendance: 337
Referee: Elizabeth Simms

20 October 2019

Arsenal	4–0	Charlton Athletic
Beattie 34'; Van de Donk 45', 50'; Mead 48'	Report

Meadow Park, Borehamwood
Attendance: 1,171
Referee: Andrew Humphries
20 October 2019

London City Lionesses	0–3	London Bees
	Report	Horwood 26'; Will 42'; Pickett 66'

Princes Park, Dartford
Attendance: 209
Referee: Jade Wardle
20 October 2019

Brighton & Hove Albion	1–2	Bristol City
Green 60' (pen.)		Harrison 9'; Salmon 45+2'

Broadfield Stadium, Crawley

3 November 2019

Brighton & Hove Albion	0–0	Arsenal
	Report
Penalties
Barton (penalty missed); Green (penalty scored); Le Tissier (penalty scored); Buet (penalty scored); Le Garrec (penalty scored)	4–2	(penalty missed) Little; (penalty scored) McCabe; (penalty missed) Mead; (penalty scored) Van de Donk

Broadfield Stadium, Crawley
Attendance: 761
Referee: Paul Howard
3 November 2019

London Bees	0–0	Charlton Athletic
	Report
Penalties
	4–2

The Hive, Canons Park
Attendance: 162
Referee: Cristiana Hattersley
3 November 2019

Bristol City	1–1	London City Lionesses
Wellings 65'	Report	Cowan 17'
Penalties
Baggaley (penalty scored); Wellings (penalty scored); Chance (penalty missed); Salmon (penalty scored); Humphrey (penalty missed)	3–4	(penalty missed) Kemppi; (penalty scored) Susanna; (penalty scored) Fitzgerald; (penalty scored) Ejupi; (penalty scored) Wilson

Stoke Gifford Stadium, Filton
Attendance: 317
Referee: Rick Hulme

20 November 2019

London Bees	0–5	Brighton & Hove Albion
	Report	Nildén 43'; Williams 50'; Simpkins 60'; Umotong 70'; Natkiel 87'

The Hive, Canons Park
Attendance: 152
Referee: Stacey Pearson
20 November 2019

Charlton Athletic	1–0	London City Lionesses
Estcourt 80'	Report

The Oakwood, Crayford
Attendance: 226
Referee: Chloe-Ann Anderson
21 November 2019

Arsenal	7–0	Bristol City
Little 33', 52'; Roord 45'; Miedema 57', 76'; Nobbs 87'; Beattie 90'	Report

Meadow Park, Borehamwood
Attendance: 805
Referee: Louise Saunders

11 December 2019

Arsenal	9–0	London Bees
McCabe 8', 34', 54'; Filis 45', 77', 86'; Evans 48', 88'; Mead 49'	Report

Meadow Park, Borehamwood
Referee: Lisa Benn
11 December 2019

London City Lionesses	2–4	Brighton & Hove Albion
Clarke 47' (pen.); Mason 89'	Report	Lundorf 18'; Umotong 57'; Bennett 68' (o.g.); Simpkins 79'

Princes Park, Dartford
Attendance: 43
Referee: Abigail Byrne
11 December 2019

Charlton Athletic	2–5	Bristol City
Devlin 32', 90'	Report	Salmon 15'; Wellings 61'; Robinson 70'; van der Linden 80'; Wilson 83'

The Oakwood, Crayford
Attendance: 114

=== Group C ===
Pos	Team	Pld	W	WPEN	LPEN	L	GF	GA	GD	Pts	Qualification	MNU	MCI	BIR	EVE	LEI
1	Manchester United	4	4	0	0	0	19	2	+17	12	Advance to knock-out stage	—	2–0	—	—	11–1
2	Manchester City	4	3	0	0	1	11	4	+7	9	Advance to knock-out stage	—	—	2–1	—	5–0
3	Birmingham City	4	2	0	0	2	8	6	+2	6		1–3	—	—	1–0	—
4	Everton	4	1	0	0	3	5	8	−3	3		0–3	1–4	—	—	—
5	Leicester City	4	0	0	0	4	2	25	−23	0		—	—	1–5	0–4	—

Source: thefa.com
Rules for classification: 1) Points; 2) Goal difference; 3) Number of goals scored; 4) Number of wins; 5) Head-to-head record
22 September 2019

Birmingham City	1–0	Everton
Williams 73'	Report

Damson Park, Solihull
Attendance: 511
Referee: Lucy Oliver
22 September 2019

Manchester City	5–0	Leicester City
Weir 28', 75'; Bremer 57', 65'; Wullaert 81'	Report

Academy Stadium, Manchester
Attendance: 1,403
Referee: Thomas Kirk

20 October 2019

Manchester United	2–0	Manchester City
Zelem 7'; Sigsworth 54'	Report

Leigh Sports Village, Leigh
Attendance: 4,042
Referee: Amy Fearn
20 October 2019

Leicester City	1–5	Birmingham City
Paul 62' (pen.)	Report	Williams 15', 57'; Staniforth 33', 80'; Jordan 58'

Farley Way Stadium, Quorn
Attendance: 368
Referee: Scott Simpson

3 November 2019

Everton	0–3	Manchester United
	Report	James 22', Zelem 78' (pen.); Turner 87'

Haig Avenue, Southport
Attendance: 361
Referee: Rebecca Welsh
3 November 2019

Manchester City	2–1	Birmingham City
White 50'; Weir 68'	Report	Williams 64'

Academy Stadium, Manchester
Attendance: 1,178
Referee: Elizabeth Simms

21 November 2019

Everton	1–4	Manchester City
Pike 48'	Report	Beckie 36'; Wullaert 50'; Bonner 65'; Hemp 86'

Rossett Park, Crosby
Attendance: 327
Referee: Philip Jones
21 November 2019

Manchester United	11–1	Leicester City
Sigsworth 1'; Arnot 7'; Toone 21', 43', 45', 73', 87'; Smith 40'; Ross 70'; Ladd 83'; James 90+1'	Report	Smith 42'

Leigh Sports Village, Leigh
Attendance: 1,127

11 December 2019

Birmingham City	1–3	Manchester United
Grant 35'	Report	Arnot 1'; Ross 27'; Toone 90+3'

Damson Park, Solihull
Attendance: 442
Referee: Helen Conley
11 December 2019

Leicester City	0–4	Everton
	Report	Boye-Hlorkah 44'; Hughes 46'; Hinds 52'; Kaagman 85'

Farley Way Stadium, Quorn
Attendance: 342
Referee: Amy Fearn

=== Group D ===
Pos	Team	Pld	W	WPEN	LPEN	L	GF	GA	GD	Pts	Qualification	CHE	REA	WHU	TOT	CRY	LEW
1	Chelsea	5	4	0	1	0	13	3	+10	13	Advance to knock-out stage	—	1–1	2–0	5–1	—	—
2	Reading	5	3	1	0	1	14	4	+10	11	Advance to knock-out stage	—	—	0–1	—	6–0	3–2
3	West Ham United	5	3	0	1	1	13	5	+8	10		—	—	—	2–2	7–0	3–1
4	Tottenham Hotspur	5	2	1	0	2	12	11	+1	8		—	0–4	—	—	—	6–0
5	Crystal Palace	5	1	0	0	4	3	21	−18	3		0–3	—	—	0–3	—	—
6	Lewes	5	0	0	0	5	6	17	−11	0		1–2	—	—	—	2–3	—

Source: thefa.com
Rules for classification: 1) Points; 2) Goal difference; 3) Number of goals scored; 4) Number of wins; 5) Head-to-head record
22 September 2019

Lewes	2–3	Crystal Palace
Ness 12'; Taylor 68'	Report	Mosengo 8'; Khassal 23'; Laudat 71'

The Dripping Pan, Lewes
Attendance: 341
Referee: Alex Bradley
22 September 2019

Chelsea	2–0	West Ham United
England 50'; Reiten 70'	Report

Kingsmeadow, Kingston Upon Thames
Attendance: 3,041
Referee: Kirsty Dowle
22 September 2019

Tottenham Hotspur	0–4	Reading
	Report	Chaplen 32', 47'; Neville 54' (o.g.); Farrow 55'

The Hive, Canons Park
Attendance: 533
Referee: Robert Whitton

20 October 2019

Crystal Palace	0–3	Chelsea
	Report	England 51', 55'; Spence 76'

Hayes Lane, Bromley
Attendance: 807
Referee: Abigail Bryne
20 October 2019

Reading	3–2	Lewes
Williams 16', 55', 90'	Report	Donovan 27'; Noble 34'

Madjeski Stadium, Reading
Attendance: 709
Referee: Louise Sanders
20 October 2019

West Ham United	2–2	Tottenham Hotspur
Thomas 90'; Dali 90+5'	Report	Dean 52'; Green 83'
Penalties
Flaherty (penalty missed); Baunach (penalty scored); Leon (penalty missed); Dali (penalty scored)	2–4	(penalty scored) Peplow; (penalty scored) Quinn; (penalty missed) Graham; (penalty scored) Dean; (penalty scored) Furness

Rush Green Stadium, Romford
Attendance: 749
Referee: Elizabeth Simms

2 November 2019

Lewes	1–2	Chelsea
Rood 18'	Report	Cuthbert 12'; Eriksson 80'

The Dripping Pan, Lewes
Attendance: 1,019
Referee: Louise McWhinnie
3 November 2019

Crystal Palace	0–3	Tottenham Hotspur
	Report	Filbey 6'; Graham 83'; Quinn 85'

Hayes Lane, Bromley
Attendance: 308
3 November 2019

Reading	0–1	West Ham United
	Report	Lehmann 75'

Madjeski Stadium, Reading
Attendance: 877
Referee: Ryan Atkins

20 November 2019

Chelsea	5–1	Tottenham Hotspur
Spence 49'; Cuthbert 57' (pen.); England 59', 84'; Cooper 76'	Report	Ayane 78'

Kingsmeadow, Kingston Upon Thames
Attendance: 1,999
Referee: Lisa Benn
20 November 2019

West Ham United	3–1	Lewes
Kiernan 24'; Dali 29', 40'	Report	Winchester 78'

Rush Green Stadium, Romford
Attendance: 652
Referee: Kirsty Dowle
20 November 2019

Reading	6–0	Crystal Palace
Utland 8', 22', 24', 85', 90'; Leine 40'	Report

Madjeski Stadium, Reading
Attendance: 744
Referee: Emily Heaslip

11 December 2019

Chelsea	1–1	Reading
Cooper 66'	Report	Potter 15'
Penalties
Cuthbert (penalty scored); Mjelde (penalty scored); England (penalty missed); Cooper (penalty missed)	2–4	(penalty scored) Williams; (penalty scored) Chaplen; (penalty scored) Farrow; (penalty scored) Allen

Kingsmeadow, Kingston Upon Thames
Attendance: 1,783
Referee: Paul Johnson
11 December 2019

Tottenham Hotspur	6–0	Lewes
Quinn 14', 22'; Addison 34', 36', 38'; Leon 63'	Report

The Hive, Canons Park
Attendance: 205
11 December 2019

West Ham United	7–0	Crystal Palace
Kiernan 15'; Vetterlein 42'; Leon 45'; Dali 48', 71'; Longhurst 70', 74'	Report

Rush Green Stadium, Romford
Attendance: 336
Referee: Aji Ajibola

== Knock-out stage ==
Quarter-finals
Arsenal	1
Reading	0
Sheffield United	0
Manchester City	4
Manchester United	2
Brighton & Hove Albion	1
Chelsea	3
Aston Villa	1

Semi-finals
Arsenal	2
Manchester City	1
Manchester United	0
Chelsea	1

Final
Arsenal	1
Chelsea	2

=== Quarter-finals ===
The draw for this round was made live via Talksport 2 on 16 December 2019 with the winners of each group all receiving home advantage. The matches were played on Wednesday 15 January 2020 and contained two FA Women's Championship teams, double the amount that reached the quarter-finals the previous season.

15 January 2020
19:00

Chelsea	3–1	Aston Villa
Eriksson 55'; Ji 81'; Murphy 90+1'	Report	Welsh 84'

Kingsmeadow, Kingston upon Thames
Attendance: 1,799
Referee: Louise Saunders

15 January 2020
19:30

Arsenal	1–0	Reading
Little 86'	Report

Meadow Park, Borehamwood
Referee: Emily Heaslip

15 January 2020
19:30

Sheffield United	0–4	Manchester City
	Report	Bremer 38', 44', 90+3'; Coombs 73'

Proact Stadium, Chesterfield
Attendance: 1,521
Referee: Jane Simms

15 January 2020
19:30

Manchester United	2–1	Brighton & Hove Albion
McManus 13'; Ross 75'	Report	Green 83' (pen.)

Leigh Sports Village, Leigh
Attendance: 642
Referee: Martin Woods

=== Semi-finals ===
The draw for this round took place on 18 January 2019 and was broadcast live on BT Sport Score. The matches were played on 29 January 2020 and contained the same four semi-finalists as the previous season.

29 January 2020
19:30

Arsenal	2–1	Manchester City
Miedema 6'; van de Donk 44'	Report	Bonner 60'

Meadow Park, Borehamwood
Referee: Abigail Byrne

29 January 2020
19:30

Manchester United	0–1	Chelsea
	Report	Mjelde 72'

Leigh Sports Village, Leigh
Attendance: 1,044
Referee: Elizabeth Sims

=== Final ===
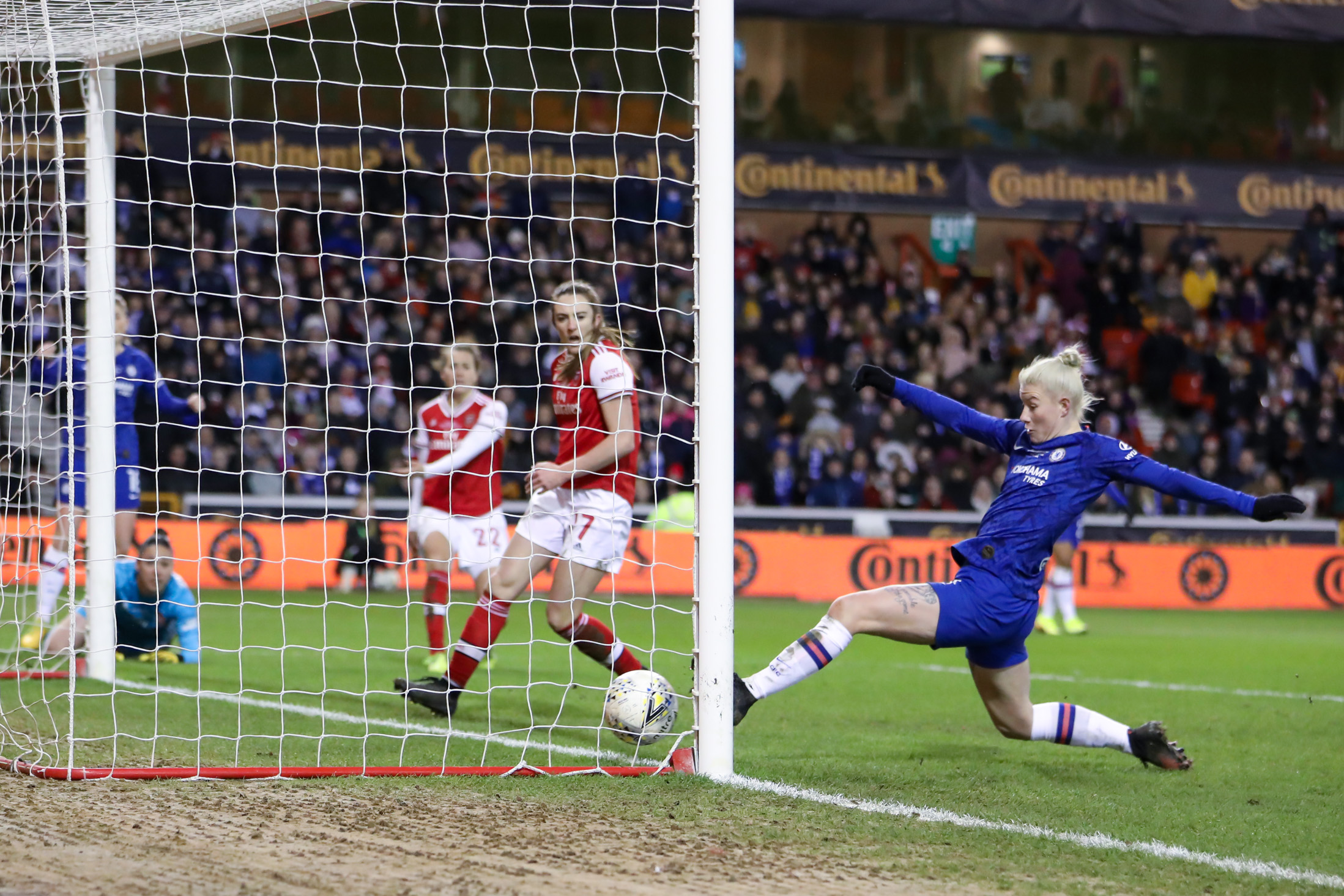
Beth England scoring the winning goal.

On 16 January, it was announced the 2020 FA Women's League Cup final would be held at the City Ground, the home of Nottingham Forest, for the first time. The game was televised live domestically on BT Sport and internationally via the FA's own streaming service the FA Player.

29 February 2020
17:30 GMT (UTC+00:00)

Arsenal	1–2	Chelsea
Williamson 85'	Report	England 8', 90+2'

City Ground, West Bridgford, Nottinghamshire
Attendance: 6,743
Referee: Helen Conley

== See also ==
- 2019–20 FA WSL
- 2019–20 FA Women's Championship
