= Becky Jane =

English footballer

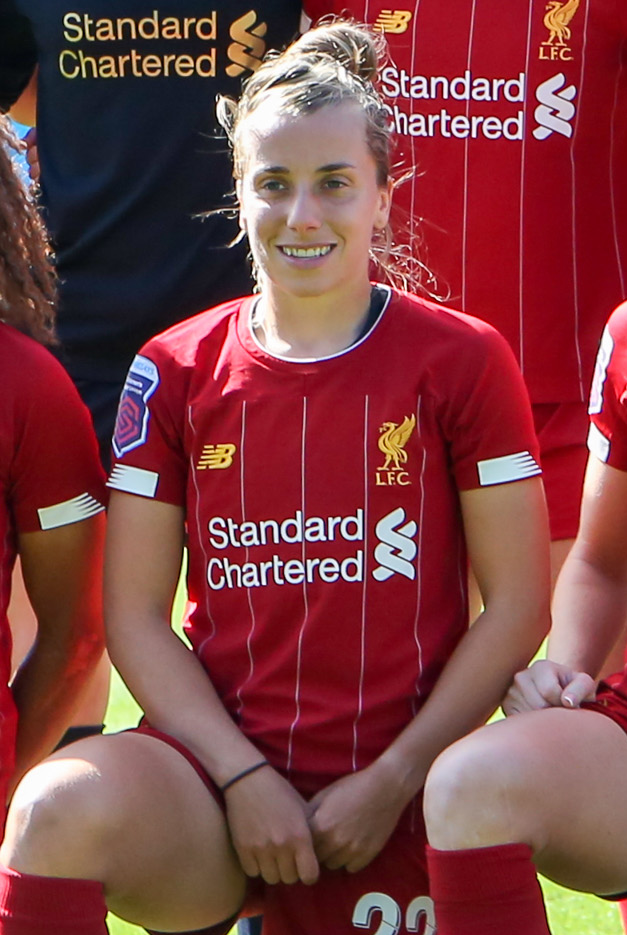
- Jane with Liverpool in 2019

Personal information
- Full name: Rebecca Jane
- Date of birth: 31 March 1992 (age 34)
- Place of birth: England
- Position: Fullback

Youth career
- Fulham
- Chelsea

Senior career*
Years	Team	Apps	(Gls)
2011	Chelsea	9	(0)
2011–2019	Reading	112	(16)
2019–2021	Liverpool	28	(3)
2021–2022	Charlton Athletic	6	(0)
2022–2023	Reading	1	(0)

International career^{‡}
- England U17
2010–11	England U19	7	(1)
2010	England U20	2	(0)
- * Club domestic league appearances and goals as of 12 February 2020 ‡ National team caps and goals as of 19 November 2018

Rebecca Jane (born 31 March 1992) is an English footballer who plays as a defender, most recently for Reading in the Women's Super League. She previously played for Chelsea, Reading, Liverpool and Charlton Athletic.

== Playing career ==
=== Club ===
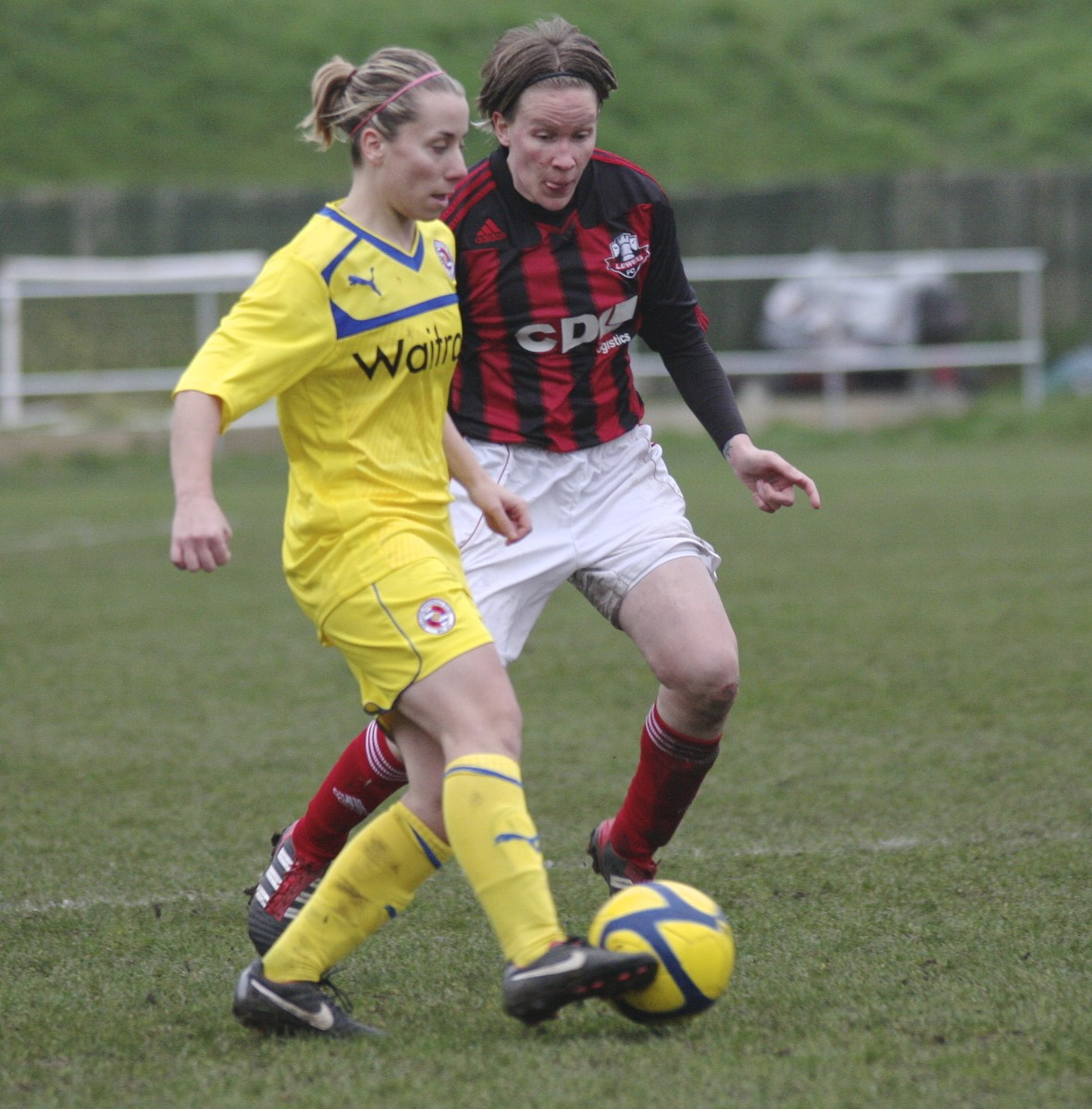
Jane (left) playing for Reading against Lewes in 2013

Jane played for Reading in the second-division FA WSL 2 during the 2015 FA WSL season. She played in the left-back position and scored two goals in 23 appearances. Jane helped the team win the league and signed a professional contract with the team ahead of the 2016 season in the FAWSL 1.

During the 2016 FA WSL regular season, Jane made 15 appearances for the club helping Reading finish in fourth place. She was named Supporters' Player of the Year. In January 2017, she signed an extended contract with the club until June 2019. During the 2017 FA WSL Spring Series, Jane played in 7 of the club's 8 matches. Reading finished in 6th place with a 2–4–2 record. During the 2017-18 FA WSL season, Jane played in six matches. The club finished in fourth place with a 9–4–5 record.

In June 2019, after more than 100 appearances for Reading, she signed for Liverpool.

On 25 May 2021 Jane left Liverpool after her contract expired.

In May 2022, Charlton Athletic announced that Jane would be one of eight players leaving the club when their contracts expired. On 3 August 2022, Jane returned to Reading, signing a one-year contract. On 29 June 2023, Janes was one of 13 senior players to leave Reading following relegation to the Women's Championship.

=== International ===
Jane has represented England on the under-17, under-19, and under-23 national teams. She scored a goal during the semi-finals of the 2008 FIFA U-17 Women's World Cup in New Zealand. Jane played for England at the 2010 UEFA Women's Under-19 Championship final.

== Honors and awards ==
with Reading

- FAWSL 2: 2015
