= 2019–20 Reading F.C. Women season =

Reading
2019–20 season
- Head Coach: Kelly Chambers
- Stadium: Adams Park, High Wycombe; Madejski Stadium, Reading
- FA WSL: 5th
- FA Cup: Fifth round
- League Cup: Quarter-final
- Top goalscorer: League: Fara Williams (5); All: Fara Williams (10)
- Highest home attendance: 1,420 (vs. Bristol City, 17 November)
- Lowest home attendance: 573 (vs. West Ham United, 12 February)
- Average home league attendance: 920 as of 12 February 2020
Home colours	Away colours

The 2019–20 Reading F.C. Women season was the club's 13th season and their fourth in the FA Women's Super League, the highest level of the football pyramid. Along with competing in the WSL, the club also contested two domestic cup competitions: the FA Cup and the League Cup.

On 13 March 2020, in line with the FA's response to the coronavirus pandemic, it was announced the season was temporarily suspended until at least 3 April 2020. After further postponements, the season was ultimately ended prematurely on 25 May 2020 with immediate effect. Reading sat in 5th at the time, overtaken by Manchester United in the final gameweek prior to the cancellation having had their fixture postponed because of Arsenal's participation in the FA Cup. They retained 5th position on sporting merit after The FA Board's decision to award places on a points-per-game basis.

== Season events ==
On 13 January, Fara Williams extended her contract with Reading until the end of the 2020-21 season.

On 15 February, Brooke Chaplen extended her contract with Reading until the end of the 2020-21 season.

== Transfers ==
=== In ===
Date	Position	Nationality	Name	From	Fee	Ref.
20 June 2019	DF	(Norway)	Kristine Bjørdal Leine	Røa IL	Undisclosed	
17 July 2019	MF	(Wales)	Angharad James	Everton	Undisclosed	
8 August 2019	FW	(Netherlands)	Maxime Bennink	PEC Zwolle	Undisclosed	
8 August 2019	FW	(Norway)	Amalie Eikeland	IL Sandviken	Undisclosed	
9 September 2019	FW	(Norway)	Lisa-Marie Utland	FC Rosengård	Undisclosed	

=== Out ===
Date	Position	Nationality	Name	To	Fee	Ref.
5 July 2019	MF	(England)	Gemma Davison	Tottenham Hotspur	Undisclosed	
9 December 2019	FW	(Iceland)	Rakel Hönnudóttir	Breiðablik	Undisclosed	
28 December 2019	MF	(Northern Ireland)	Rachel Furness	Liverpool	Undisclosed	
1 April 2020	MF	(England)	Jade Moore	Orlando Pride	Undisclosed	

=== Loans out ===
Start date	Position	Nationality	Name	To	End date	Ref.
31 July 2019	MF	(Wales)	Charlie Estcourt	Charlton Athletic	End of season	
31 July 2019	DF	(Wales)	Lily Woodham	Charlton Athletic	End of season	
6 September 2019	MF	(Northern Ireland)	Rachel Furness	Tottenham Hotspur	28 December 2019	
23 January 2020	FW	(Netherlands)	Maxime Bennink	Brighton & Hove Albion	End of season	

=== Released ===
Date	Position	Nationality	Name	Joined	Date
8 June 2020	GK	(England)	Rachael Laws	Liverpool	7 July 2020
8 June 2020	DF	(England)	Maz Pacheco	West Ham United	10 July 2020
8 June 2020	DF	(England)	Jo Potter	Retired	6 January 2021
8 June 2020	DF	(Scotland)	Sophie Howard	Leicester City	22 August 2020
8 June 2020	MF	(England)	Remi Allen	Leicester City	22 August 2020
8 June 2020	MF	(Wales)	Charlie Estcourt	London Bees	26 August 2020
8 June 2020	FW	(England)	Millie Farrow	Leicester City	22 August 2020
8 June 2020	FW	(Netherlands)	Maxime Bennick	PEC Zwolle	15 June 2020

== Squad ==
As of match played 20 February 2020

No.	Name	Nationality	Position	Date of birth (Age (Note: Age as of the end of the season))	Signed from	Signed in	Contract ends	Apps.	Goals
Goalkeepers
1	Grace Moloney	(Republic of Ireland)	GK	1 March 1993 (aged 27)	Academy	2009		159	0
27	Rachael Laws	(England)	GK	5 November 1990 (aged 29)	Sunderland	2018		13	0
Defenders
2	Kristine Bjørdal Leine	(Norway)	DF	6 August 1996 (aged 23)	Røa	2019		18	2
3	Maz Pacheco	(England)	DF	25 August 1998 (aged 21)	Doncaster Rovers Belles	2018		38	1
5	Molly Bartrip	(England)	DF	1 June 1996 (aged 23)	Academy	2014			
22	Jo Potter	(England)	DF	13 November 1984 (aged 35)	Notts County Ladies	2017			
26	Sophie Howard	(Scotland)	DF	17 September 1993 (aged 26)	1899 Hoffenheim	2018		28	0
29	Kiera Skeels	(England)	DF	20 January 2001 (aged 19)	Academy	2019		2	0
31	Bethan Roberts	(England)	DF	14 May 2003 (aged 17)	Academy	2019		0	0
Midfielders
4	Fara Williams	(England)	MF	25 January 1984 (aged 36)	Arsenal	2017		74	39
6	Angharad James	(Wales)	MF	1 June 1994 (aged 25)	Everton	2019		22	1
8	Remi Allen	(England)	MF	15 October 1990 (aged 29)	Birmingham City	2016		81	14
11	Natasha Harding (captain)	(England)	MF	2 March 1989 (aged 31)	Liverpool	2017		52	1
23	Rachel Rowe	(Wales)	MF	13 September 1992 (aged 27)	Swansea City	2015		93	8
35	Sophie Quirk	(England)	MF	12 February 2002 (aged 18)	Academy	2019		0	0
Forwards
9	Amalie Eikeland	(Norway)	FW	26 August 1995 (aged 24)	Sandviken	2019		21	2
10	Lauren Bruton	(England)	FW	22 November 1992 (aged 27)	Arsenal	2013			
14	Millie Farrow	(England)	FW	3 June 1996 (aged 23)	Bristol City	2018		22	3
16	Lisa-Marie Utland	(Norway)	FW	19 September 1992 (aged 27)	Rosengård	2019		17	7
19	Brooke Chaplen	(England)	FW	16 April 1989 (aged 31)	Sunderland	2017		68	27
Out on loan
17	Charlie Estcourt	(Wales)	MF	27 May 1998 (aged 21)	Chelsea	2015			
21	Maxime Bennink	(Netherlands)	FW	21 June 1997 (aged 22)	PEC Zwolle	2019		1	0
28	Lily Woodham	(Wales)	DF	3 September 2000 (aged 19)	Bristol City	2018		6	0
Left during the season
7	Rachel Furness	(Northern Ireland)	MF	19 June 1988 (aged 31)	Sunderland	2017		52	9
15	Rakel Hönnudóttir	(Iceland)	FW	30 December 1988 (aged 31)	Limhamn Bunkeflo	2019		14	3
18	Jade Moore	(England)	MF	22 October 1990 (aged 29)	Notts County Ladies	2017		57	8

=== Out on loan ===
Note: Flags indicate national team as defined under FIFA eligibility rules; some limited exceptions apply. Players may hold more than one non-FIFA nationality.

No.	Pos.	Nation	Player
17	MF	WAL	Charlie Estcourt (at Charlton Athletic)
21	FW	NED	Maxime Bennink (at Brighton & Hove Albion)
28	DF	WAL	Lily Woodham (at Charlton Athletic)

== Friendlies ==
4 August 2019	Reading	6–1	Charlton Athletic	Bisham
14:00	Furness; Williams; Farrow; Harding	Report	Clifford	Stadium: Bisham Abbey Sports Ground

14 August 2019	Valencia (Spain)	2–2	Reading	Valencia, Spain
	Jiménez 36'; Beltrán 62'		Williams 3'; Eikeland 47'	Stadium: Ciudad Deportiva de Paterna

== Competitions ==
=== Overview ===
Competition	First match	Last match	Starting round	Final position	Record							
Competition	First match	Last match	Starting round	Final position	Pld	W	D	L	GF	GA	GD	Win %
WSL	8 September 2019	12 February 2020	Matchday 1	5th	14	6	3	5	21	24	−3	42.86
FA Cup	26 January 2020	20 February 2020	Fourth round	Fifth Round	2	1	0	1	6	2	+4	50.00
EFL Cup	22 September 2019	15 January 2020	Group Stage	Quarterfinal	6	4	0	2	14	5	+9	66.67
Total					22	11	3	8	41	31	+10	50.00

Last updated: 20 February 2020
Source: Competitions

=== WSL ===
==== Results summary ====
Overall								Home						Away					
Pld	W	D	L	GF	GA	GD	Pts	W	D	L	GF	GA	GD	W	D	L	GF	GA	GD
14	6	3	5	21	24	−3	21	4	2	2	13	12	+1	2	1	3	8	12	−4

Last updated: 12 February 2020.
Source: FA WSL

==== Results by matchday ====
Round	1	2	3	4	5	6	7	8	9	10	11	12	13	14
Ground	A	H	H	A	H	A	A	H	H	A	H	A	H	H
Result	W	L	W	L	D	W	D	L	W	L	W	L	D	W
Position	5	7	7	8	7	6	6	7	6	6	4	6	6	4

A = Away; H = Home; W = Win; D = Draw; L = Loss

==== Results ====
8 September 2019 1	Liverpool	0–1	Reading	Birkenhead
14:00	Robe (yellow card) 16'	Report	Williams 42'; James (yellow card) 84'	Stadium: Prenton Park; Attendance: 1,435; Referee: Samuel Barrott

15 September 2019 2	Reading	0–2	Manchester City	High Wycombe
12:30		Report	Bremer 30', 59'	Stadium: Adams Park; Attendance: 897; Referee: Stacey Pearson

29 September 2019 3	Birmingham City	P–P	Reading	Solihull
14:00				Stadium: Damson Park
Note: Postponed due to waterlogged pitch

13 October 2019 4	Reading	3–2	Everton	High Wycombe
14:00	Moore 7', 17'; Farrow (yellow card) 55'; Utland 70'	Report	Kelly 10', (yellow card) 80'; Graham 23' (pen.), (yellow card) 69'; Clémaron (yellow card) 90+3'	Stadium: Adams Park; Attendance: 616; Referee: Alan Dale

27 October 2019 5	Manchester United	2–0	Reading	Leigh
12:30	Hanson 16'; Ladd (yellow card) 71'; Sigsworth 85'	Report	Allen (yellow card) 67'	Stadium: Leigh Sports Village; Attendance: 1,997; Referee: Helen Conley

17 November 2019 6	Reading	3–3	Bristol City	Reading
14:00	Allen 17'; Chaplen 18'; James 47'; Howard (yellow card) 74'	Report	Brown (yellow card) 25'; Wellings 38'; Daniëls 49'; Salmon 83'	Stadium: Madjeski Stadium; Attendance: 1,420; Referee: Kirsty Dowle

24 November 2019 7	West Ham United	2–3	Reading	Romford
15:00	Baunach 4'; Kvamme (yellow card) 15'; Kiernan 65'; Middag (yellow card) 70'	Report	Rowe (red card) 45+3'; Leine 75'; Chaplen 76'; Moore 82'; James (yellow card) 87'; Moloney (yellow card) 90+2'	Stadium: Rush Green Stadium; Attendance: 1,392; Referee: Lloyd Wood

29 November 2019 8	Brighton & Hove Albion	2–2	Reading	Crawley
19:45	Whelan 18'; Umotong 34'	Report	Williams 15'; Eikeland (yellow card) 43'; Allen 90+5'	Stadium: Broadfield Stadium

8 December 2019 9	Reading	0–3	Arsenal	High Wycombe
14:30	Moore (yellow card) 31'; Pacheco (yellow card) 50'; Utland (yellow card) 57'	Report	Miedema 28', 90+1'; Little 37'	Stadium: Adams Park; Attendance: 943; Referee: Richard Hulme

15 December 2019 10	Reading	3–1	Tottenham Hotspur	High Wycombe
14:00	Howard (yellow card) 34'; Leine (yellow card) 49'; Allen (yellow card) 55' (goal) 87'; Potter 77'; Eikeland 90+9'	Report	Worm 52'	Stadium: Adams Park; Attendance: 715; Referee: Stacey Pearson

5 January 2020 11	Chelsea	3–1	Reading	Kingston upon Thames
14:00	England 41'; Reiten 64'; Cuthbert 75'	Report	Williams 16'; Moloney (red card) 17'; Allen (yellow card) 67'	Stadium: Kingsmeadow; Attendance: 2,828; Referee: Stacey Pearson

12 January 2020 12	Reading	1–0	Birmingham City	High Wycombe
14:00	Eikeland 39'; Moore (yellow card) 45+3'	Report	Williams (yellow card) 72'	Stadium: Adams Park; Attendance: 733; Referee: Thomas Bisham

19 January 2020 13	Everton	3–1	Reading	Southport
14:00	Kelly 11', 59', 65'; Stringer (yellow card) 48'	Report	Williams 31' (pen.); Allen (yellow card) 81'; Moore (yellow card) 90+4'	Stadium: Haig Avenue

2 February 2020 14	Reading	1–1	Manchester United	High Wycombe
14:00	Moore (yellow card) 61'; Bartrip (yellow card) 74'; Williams 80' (pen.); Utland (yellow card) 90+4'	Report	James 30'; A. Turner (yellow card) 66'; Zelem (yellow card) 80'	Stadium: Adams Park; Attendance: 1,256; Referee: Kirsty Dowle

9 February 2020 15	Bristol City	P–P	Reading	Filton
15:00				Stadium: Stoke Gifford Stadium
Note: All WSL games postponed due to adverse weather conditions

12 February 2020 16	Reading	2–0	West Ham United	High Wycombe
19:30	Moore 23' (yellow card) 77'; Chaplen 63'; Laws (yellow card) 88'	Report	Longhurst (yellow card) 24'; Galabadaarachchi (yellow card) 59'	Stadium: Adams Park; Attendance: 573; Referee: Abigail Byrne

23 February 2020 17	Arsenal	P–P	Reading	Borehamwood
14:00				Stadium: Meadow Park
Note: Postponed due to Arsenal's rescheduled FA Cup commitments

22 March 2020 18	Reading	Cancelled	Brighton & Hove Albion	High Wycombe
14:00				Stadium: Adams Park
Note: Cancelled due to coronavirus pandemic

29 March 2020 19	Reading	Cancelled	Liverpool	High Wycombe
14:00				Stadium: Adams Park
Note: Cancelled due to coronavirus pandemic

5 April 2020 20	Manchester City	Cancelled	Reading	Manchester
14:00				Stadium: Academy Stadium
Note: Cancelled due to coronavirus pandemic

26 April 2020 21	Reading	Cancelled	Chelsea	High Wycombe
14:00				Stadium: Adams Park
Note: Cancelled due to coronavirus pandemic

6 May 2020 3	Birmingham City	Cancelled	Reading	Solihull
19:30				Stadium: Damson Park
Note: Rescheduled from 29 September 2019. Cancelled due to coronavirus pandemic

10 May 2020 15	Bristol City	Cancelled	Reading	Filton
15:00				Stadium: Stoke Gifford Stadium
Note: Rescheduled from 9 February 2020. Cancelled due to coronavirus pandemic

16 May 2020 22	Tottenham Hotspur	Cancelled	Reading	Canons Park
				Stadium: The Hive Stadium
Note: Cancelled due to coronavirus pandemic

==== Table ====
Pos	Team	Pld	W	D	L	GF	GA	GD	Pts	PPG
3	Arsenal	15	12	0	3	40	13	+27	36	2.40
4	Manchester United	14	7	2	5	24	12	+12	23	1.64
5	Reading	14	6	3	5	21	24	−3	21	1.50
6	Everton	14	6	1	7	21	21	0	19	1.36
7	Tottenham Hotspur	15	6	2	7	15	24	−9	20	1.33

Source: FA WSL, BBC
Rules for classification: Initially: 1) Points; 2) Goal difference; 3) Number of goals scored. After abandonment of season: 1) Points per game

=== FA Cup ===
As a member of the top two tiers, Reading entered the FA Cup in the fourth round.

26 January 2020 Fourth round	London City Lionesses	0–5	Reading	Dartford
14:00	Mason (yellow card) 10'; Ayisi 22'	Report	Williams 13', 78'; Potter 30'; Pacheco 44'; Utland 58'	Stadium: Princes Park

20 February 2020 Fifth round	Leicester City	2–1 (a.e.t.)	Reading	Quorn
19:45	Bailey-Gayle 79', 116'	Report	Chaplen 45' (pen.)	Stadium: Farley Way Stadium
Note: Rescheduled from 16 February 2020 due to Storm Dennis.

=== League Cup ===
==== Group stage ====
Pos	Team	Pld	W	WPEN	LPEN	L	GF	GA	GD	Pts	Qualification
1	Chelsea	5	4	0	1	0	13	3	+10	13	Advance to Knock-out stage
2	Reading	5	3	1	0	1	14	4	+10	11	Advance to Knock-out stage
3	West Ham United	5	3	0	1	1	13	5	+8	10	
4	Tottenham Hotspur	5	2	1	0	2	12	11	+1	8	
5	Crystal Palace	5	1	0	0	4	3	21	−18	3	
6	Lewes	5	0	0	0	5	6	17	−11	0	

Updated to match(es) played on 11 December 2019. Source: thefa.com
Rules for classification: 1) Points; 2) Goal difference; 3) Number of goals scored; 4) Number of wins; 5) Head-to-head record

22 September 2019 Group stage	Tottenham	0–4	Reading	Canons Park
14:00	Haines (yellow card) 90'; Neville (yellow card) 90'	Report	Chaplen 32', 47'; Neville 54' (o.g.); Farrow 55'; Harding (yellow card) 74'; Allen (yellow card) 81'	Stadium: The Hive Stadium; Attendance: 533; Referee: Robert Whitton

20 October 2019 Group stage	Reading	3–2	Lewes	Reading
14:00	Williams 16', 55', 90'	Report	Donovan 27'; Noble 34'; Cleverly (yellow card) 60'	Stadium: Madjeski Stadium; Attendance: 709; Referee: Louise Sanders

3 November 2019 Group stage	Reading	0–1	West Ham United	Reading
14:00	Pacheco (yellow card) 75'	Report	Dali (yellow card) 52'; Middag (yellow card) 69'; Lehmann 75'	Stadium: Madjeski Stadium; Attendance: 877; Referee: Ryan Atkins

21 November 2019 Group stage	Reading	6–0	Crystal Palace	Reading
19:30	Utland 8', 22', 24', 85', 90'; Leine 40'	Report	MacKenzie (yellow card)	Stadium: Madjeski Stadium

11 December 2019 Group stage	Chelsea	1–1 (2 – 4 p)	Reading	Kingston upon Thames
19:00	Carter (yellow card) 14'; Cooper 66'	Report	Potter 15'; Moore (yellow card) 44'	Stadium: Kingsmeadow; Attendance: Paul Johnson; Referee: 1,783
	Penalties
	Cuthbert (penalty scored); Mjelde (penalty scored); England (penalty missed); Cooper (penalty missed)		(penalty scored) Williams; (penalty scored) Chaplen; (penalty scored) Farrow; (penalty scored) Allen

==== Knockout phase ====
15 January 2020 Quarter-final	Arsenal	1–0	Reading	Borehamwood
19:30	Roord (yellow card) 35' van de Donk (yellow card) 37'; Little 86'	Report	Moore (yellow card) 62'; James (yellow card) 63'; Rowe (yellow card) 73'	Stadium: Meadow Park; Referee: Emily Heaslip

== Squad statistics ==
=== Appearances ===
As of match played 20 February 2020

No.	Pos	Nat	Player	Total		FA WSL		FA Cup		League Cup	
No.	Pos	Nat	Player	Apps	Goals	Apps	Goals	Apps	Goals	Apps	Goals
1	GK	(Republic of Ireland) IRL	Grace Moloney	12	0	10	0	1	0	1	0
2	DF	(Norway) NOR	Kristine Bjørdal Leine	18	2	11	1	1+1	0	5	1
3	DF	(England) ENG	Maz Pacheco	16	1	7+2	0	2	1	4+1	0
4	MF	(England) ENG	Fara Williams	21	10	14	5	1	2	5+1	3
5	DF	(England) ENG	Molly Bartrip	6	0	2+2	0	1	0	1	0
6	MF	(Wales) WAL	Angharad James	22	1	13+1	1	2	0	6	0
8	MF	(England) ENG	Remi Allen	18	3	12	3	1	0	4+1	0
9	FW	(Norway) NOR	Amalie Eikeland	21	2	12+2	2	1+1	0	3+2	0
10	FW	(England) ENG	Lauren Bruton	0	0	0	0	0	0	0	0
11	MF	(England) ENG	Natasha Harding	12	0	6+2	0	2	0	2	0
14	FW	(England) ENG	Millie Farrow	16	1	3+6	0	2	0	2+3	1
16	FW	(Norway) NOR	Lisa-Marie Utland	17	7	3+7	1	2	1	5	5
19	MF	(England) ENG	Brooke Chaplen	22	6	13+1	3	2	1	4+2	2
22	DF	(England) ENG	Jo Potter	12	3	8+1	1	1	1	2	1
23	MF	(Wales) WAL	Rachel Rowe	19	0	11+1	0	0+2	0	4+1	0
26	DF	(Scotland) SCO	Sophie Howard	18	0	11	0	1+1	0	5	0
27	GK	(England) ENG	Rachael Laws	11	0	4+1	0	1	0	5	0
28	DF	(England) ENG	Kiera Skeels	2	0	0	0	0	0	2	0
35	MF	(England) ENG	Sophie Quirk	1	0	0	0	0+1	0	0	0
Players away from the club on loan:
21	FW	(Netherlands) NED	Maxime Bennick	1	0	0	0	0	0	0+1	0
Players who appeared for Reading but left during the season:
15	FW	(Iceland) ISL	Rakel Hönnudóttir	6	0	0+4	0	0	0	1+1	0
18	MF	(England) ENG	Jade Moore	21	4	14	4	1	0	5+1	0

=== Goal scorers ===
As of match played 20 February 2020

Place	Position	Nation	Number	Name	FA WSL	FA Cup	League Cup	Total
1	MF	(England)	4	Fara Williams	5	2	3	10
2	FW	(Norway)	16	Lisa-Marie Utland	1	1	5	7
3	MF	(England)	19	Brooke Chaplen	3	1	2	6
4	MF	(England)	18	Jade Moore	4	0	0	4
5	MF	(England)	8	Remi Allen	3	0	0	3
5	DF	(England)	22	Jo Potter	1	1	1	3
7	FW	(Norway)	9	Amalie Eikeland	2	0	0	2
7	DF	(Norway)	2	Kristine Bjørdal Leine	1	0	1	2
9	MF	(Wales)	6	Angharad James	1	0	0	1
9	DF	(England)	3	Maz Pacheco	0	1	0	1
9	FW	(England)	14	Millie Farrow	0	0	1	1
9	Own goal				0	0	1	1
Total					21	6	14	41

=== Clean sheets ===
Place	Position	Nation	Number	Name	WSL	FA Cup	League Cup	Total
1	GK	(England)	27	Rachael Laws	2	1	1	4
2	GK	(Republic of Ireland)	1	Grace Moloney	1	0	1	2
Total					3	1	2	6

=== Disciplinary record ===
As of match played 20 February 2020

Number	Nation	Position	Name	FA WSL		FA Cup		League Cup		Total	
Number	Nation	Position	Name	Booked	Sent off (straight red)	Booked	Sent off (straight red)	Booked	Sent off (straight red)	Booked	Sent off (straight red)
1	(Republic of Ireland)	GK	Grace Moloney	0	1	1	0	0	0	1	1
2	(Norway)	DF	Kristine Bjørdal Leine	1	0	0	0	0	0	1	0
3	(England)	DF	Maz Pacheco	1	0	0	0	1	0	2	0
5	(England)	DF	Molly Bartrip	1	0	0	0	0	0	1	0
6	(Wales)	MF	Angharad James	1	0	0	0	1	0	2	0
8	(England)	MF	Remi Allen	4	0	0	0	1	0	5	0
9	(Norway)	FW	Amalie Eikeland	1	0	0	0	0	0	1	0
11	(Wales)	MF	Natasha Harding	0	0	0	0	1	0	1	0
14	(England)	FW	Millie Farrow	1	0	0	0	0	0	1	0
16	(Norway)	FW	Lisa-Marie Utland	2	0	0	0	0	0	2	0
23	(Wales)	MF	Rachel Rowe	0	1	0	0	1	0	1	1
26	(Scotland)	DF	Sophie Howard	2	0	0	0	0	0	2	0
27	(England)	GK	Rachael Laws	1	0	0	0	0	0	1	0
Players away on loan:
Players who left Reading during the season:
18	(England)	MF	Jade Moore	5	0	0	0	2	0	7	0
Total				20	2	1	0	7	0	28	2
