= 2020–21 Reading F.C. Women season =

Reading
2020–21 season
- Manager: Kelly Chambers
- Stadium: Madejski Stadium
- WSL: 7th
- FA Cup: Fourth round vs Tottenham Hotspur
- League Cup: Group Stage
- Top goalscorer: League: Rachel Rowe (5); All: Two Players (6)
Home colours	Away colours

The 2020–21 Reading F.C. Women season was the club's 14th season and their sixth in the FA Women's Super League, the highest level of the football pyramid. Reading finished the season in 7th place, were knocked out of the FA Cup in the fourth round and finished second in their League Cup group.

== Season events ==
On 15 July, Reading announced the signing of Danielle Carter and Emma Mitchell from Arsenal.

On 17 July, Reading announced the signing of Deanna Cooper, who last played for Chelsea. On the same day, Reading announced new contracts for Natasha Harding, Kiera Skeels and Lily Woodham.

On 14 August, Reading announced the signing of Erin Nayler from Girondins de Bordeaux.

On 19 August, Jess Fishlock joined Reading on loan from OL Reign.

On 1 September, Reading were drawn in Group D of the League Cup alongside West Ham United, Charlton Athletic and Brighton & Hove Albion.

On 4 September, Reading announced the signing of Jeon Ga-eul.

On 8 January, midfielder Sophie Quirk moved to London Bees on loan for the remainder of the season.

On 6 February, Reading announced the signing of Silvana Flores. On 16 February, Grace Moloney extended her contract with Reading until the summer of 2023.

On 19 February, Reading confirmed that Jess Fishlock's loan from OL Reign would end on 4 April, with Brooke Chaplen extending her contract with the club until the summer of 2022 on 22 February.

On 26 March, Rachel Rowe extended her contract with Reading until June 2024.

On 26 April, Fara Williams announced that she would be retiring at the end of the season.

On 12 May, Reading announced that Molly Bartrip, Lauren Bruton, Kristine Leine, Erin Nayler, Silvana Flores and Molly Childerhouse would all be leaving the club, alongside Fara Williams and Angharad James, when their contracts expire at the end of the season.

== Transfers ==
=== In ===
Date	Position	Nationality	Name	From	Fee	Ref.
15 July 2020	DF	(Scotland)	Emma Mitchell	Arsenal	Free	
15 July 2020	FW	(England)	Danielle Carter	Arsenal	Free	
17 July 2020	DF	(England)	Deanna Cooper	Chelsea	Free	
14 August 2020	GK	(New Zealand)	Erin Nayler	Girondins de Bordeaux	Free	
4 September 2020	FW	(South Korea)	Jeon Ga-eul	Bristol City	Free	
6 February 2021	MF	(Mexico)	Silvana Flores	Chelsea	Free	

=== Loans in ===
Start date	Position	Nationality	Name	From	End date	Ref.
19 August 2020	MF	(Wales)	Jess Fishlock	OL Reign	4 April 2021	

=== Out ===
Date	Position	Nationality	Name	To	Fee	Ref.
24 June 2020	FW	(Norway)	Lisa-Marie Karlseng Utland	Rosenborg	Undisclosed	

=== Loans out ===
Start date	Position	Nationality	Name	To	End date	Ref.
8 January 2021	MF	(England)	Sophie Quirk	London Bees	End of season	

=== Released ===
Date	Position	Nationality	Name	Joined	Date	Ref.
31 May 2021	GK	(New Zealand)	Erin Nayler	Umeå IK	1 January 2022	
31 May 2021	DF	(England)	Molly Bartrip	Tottenham Hotspur	16 July 2021	
31 May 2021	DF	(Norway)	Kristine Leine	Rosenborg		
31 May 2021	MF	(England)	Molly Childerhouse	Oxford United	21 July 2021	
31 May 2021	MF	(England)	Fara Williams	Retired		
31 May 2021	MF	(Mexico)	Silvana Flores	Tottenham Hotspur		
31 May 2021	MF	(Wales)	Angharad James	North Carolina Courage		
31 May 2021	FW	(England)	Lauren Bruton	Charlton Athletic		

== Squad ==
As of match played 9 May 2021

No.	Name	Nationality	Position	Date of birth (age)	Signed from	Signed in	Contract ends	Apps.	Goals
Goalkeepers
1	Grace Moloney	(Republic of Ireland)	GK	1 March 1993 (aged 28)	Academy	2009	2023	184	0
16	Erin Nayler	(New Zealand)	GK	17 April 1992 (aged 29)	Girondins de Bordeaux	2020		1	0
72	Rhiannon Stewart	(England)	GK		Academy	2019		0	0
Defenders
2	Kristine Bjørdal Leine	(Norway)	DF	6 August 1996 (aged 24)	Røa	2019		40	2
3	Emma Mitchell	(Scotland)	DF	19 September 1992 (aged 28)	Arsenal	2020		17	0
5	Molly Bartrip	(England)	DF	1 June 1996 (aged 24)	Academy	2014		108	
14	Deanna Cooper	(England)	DF	20 June 1993 (aged 27)	Chelsea	2020		24	0
28	Lily Woodham	(Wales)	DF	3 September 2000 (aged 20)	Bristol City	2018		21	0
31	Bethan Roberts	(Wales)	DF	14 May 2003 (aged 17)	Academy	2019		7	0
Midfielders
4	Fara Williams	(England)	MF	25 January 1984 (aged 37)	Arsenal	2017	2021	93	43
6	Angharad James	(Wales)	MF	1 June 1994 (aged 26)	Everton	2019	2021	48	2
11	Natasha Harding (captain)	(Wales)	MF	2 March 1989 (aged 32)	Liverpool	2017		78	7
23	Rachel Rowe	(Wales)	MF	13 September 1992 (aged 28)	Swansea City	2015	2024	116	14
24	Silvana Flores	(Mexico)	MF	18 April 2002 (aged 19)	Chelsea	2021		0	0
32	Molly Childerhouse	(England)	MF		Academy	2020		0	0
Forwards
7	Jeon Ga-eul	(South Korea)	FW	14 September 1988 (aged 32)	Bristol City	2020		6	0
9	Amalie Eikeland	(Norway)	FW	26 August 1995 (aged 25)	Sandviken	2019		47	5
10	Lauren Bruton	(England)	FW	22 November 1992 (aged 28)	Arsenal	2013			
18	Danielle Carter	(England)	FW	18 May 1993 (aged 27)	Arsenal	2020		25	4
19	Brooke Chaplen	(England)	FW	16 April 1989 (aged 32)	Sunderland	2017	2022	79	29
36	Emma Harries	(England)	FW	29 March 2002 (aged 19)	Academy	2020		20	1
Out on loan
29	Kiera Skeels	(England)	DF	20 January 2001 (aged 20)	Academy	2019		2	0
35	Sophie Quirk	(England)	MF	12 February 2002 (aged 19)	Academy	2019		0	0
Left during the season
8	Jess Fishlock	(Wales)	MF	14 January 1987 (aged 34)	loan from OL Reign	2020		22	2

=== Out on loan ===
Note: Flags indicate national team as defined under FIFA eligibility rules; some limited exceptions apply. Players may hold more than one non-FIFA nationality.

No. / Pos. / Nation / Player; 29 / DF / ENG / Kiera Skeels (at Bristol City until end of the season.)	No. / Pos. / Nation / Player; 35 / MF / ENG / Sophie Quirk (at London Bees until end of the season.)

== Competitions ==
=== WSL ===
==== Results summary ====
Overall								Home						Away					
Pld	W	D	L	GF	GA	GD	Pts	W	D	L	GF	GA	GD	W	D	L	GF	GA	GD
22	5	9	8	25	40	−15	24	2	5	4	11	19	−8	3	4	4	14	21	−7

Last updated: 9 May 2021.
Source: FA WSL

==== Results by matchday ====
Round	1	2	3	4	5	6	7	8	9	10	11	12	13	14	15	16	17	18	19	20	21	22
Ground	A	H	A	H	H	A	A	H	A	A	H	H	A	A	H	A	H	A	H	A	H	A
Result	L	W	W	L	D	D	D	D	L	W	L	D	D	W	D	L	D	L	L	D	W	L
Position	12	7	6	6	6	6	7	6	6	6	6	6	6	6	6	7	7	7	7	7	6	7

A = Away; H = Home; W = Win; D = Draw; L = Loss

==== Results ====
6 September 2020 1	Arsenal	6–1	Reading	Borehamwood
12:30 BST (UTC+1)	Little 15'; Miedema 33', 78'; Roord 40', 63', 81'; Maritz (yellow card) 42'; Maier (yellow card) 86'	Report	Bruton (yellow card) 56'; Fishlock (yellow card) 60'; Harding (yellow card) 69'; Carter 89'	Stadium: Meadow Park; Attendance: 0 Referee: Amy Fearns
Note: Match played behind closed doors due to the COVID-19 pandemic in the United Kingdom.

13 September 2020 2	Reading	3–1	Aston Villa	Reading
14:00 BST (UTC+1)	Eikeland 24'; Bruton 40' (yellow card) 85'; Williams 45+3' (pen.); Harding (yellow card) 72'	Report	Siems (yellow card) 59'; Larsen 79' (pen.) (yellow card) 90+6'	Stadium: Madejski Stadium; Attendance: 0 Referee: Emily Heaslip
Note: Match played behind closed doors due to the COVID-19 pandemic in the United Kingdom.

4 October 2020 3	West Ham United	0–1	Reading	Dagenham
15:00 BST (UTC+1)	Dali (penalty missed) 60'	Report	Bruton 26'; Bartrip (yellow card) 31'	Stadium: Chigwell Construction Stadium; Attendance: 0 Referee: Robert Whitton
Note: Match played behind closed doors due to the COVID-19 pandemic in the United Kingdom.

11 October 2020 4	Reading	0–1	Birmingham City	Reading
14:00 BST (UTC+1)		Report	Scott (yellow card) 64'; Walker 72'; Scofield (yellow card) 82'	Stadium: Madejski Stadium; Attendance: 0 Referee: Sarah Garratt
Note: Match played behind closed doors due to the COVID-19 pandemic in the United Kingdom.

18 October 2020 5	Reading	1–1	Manchester City	Reading
14:00 BST (UTC+1)	Eikeland 3'; Mitchell (yellow card) 51'	Report	Mewis 56'	Stadium: Madejski Stadium; Attendance: 0 Referee: Savvas Yianni
Note: Match played behind closed doors due to the COVID-19 pandemic in the United Kingdom.

7 November 2020 6	Tottenham Hotspur	1–1	Reading	Edgware
14:00 GMT (UTC)	Neville 25'; Harrop (yellow card) 63'	Report	Chaplen 13'; Rowe (yellow card) 22'	Stadium: The Hive Stadium; Attendance: 0 Referee: Helen Conley
Note: Match played behind closed doors due to the COVID-19 pandemic in the United Kingdom.

14 November 2020 7	Everton	1–1	Reading	Liverpool
16:30 GMT (UTC)	Magill 39'; Christiansen (yellow card) 66'	Report	Harding 42'	Stadium: Walton Hall Park; Attendance: 0 Referee: Emily Heaslip
Note: Match played behind closed doors due to the COVID-19 pandemic in the United Kingdom.

6 December 2020 8	Reading	1–1	Bristol City	Reading
14:00 GMT (UTC)	Williams 50'; Cooper (yellow card) 62'	Report	Bissell 43'	Stadium: Madejski Stadium; Referee: Lucy Oliver

13 December 2020 9	Reading	1–2	Manchester United	Reading
12:30 GMT (UTC)	Leine (yellow card) 18'; M.Turner 56' (o.g.); Bartrip (yellow card) 64'	Report	Galton 32'; A.Turner (yellow card) 63'; Ladd 83'; Heath (yellow card) 90+5'	Stadium: Madejski Stadium; Referee: Helen Conley

20 December 2020 10	Brighton & Hove Albion	1–3	Reading	Crawley
14:30 GMT (UTC)	Kaagman 21' (pen.); Bowman (yellow card) 55'	Report	Fishlock 17', 44'; Leine (yellow card) 23'; Bartrip (yellow card) 61'; Carter (yellow card) 88'; Rowe 90+1'	Stadium: Broadfield Stadium; Attendance: 365; Referee: Abigail Byrne

10 January 2021 11	Reading	0–5	Chelsea	Reading
14:00 GMT (UTC)	Williams (yellow card) 45+1'; Moloney (yellow card) 45+2'	Report	Kirby 16', 23', 45+2', 53'; Ji 86'	Stadium: Madejski Stadium; Attendance: 0 Referee: Abigail Byrne
Note: Match played behind closed doors due to the COVID-19 pandemic in the United Kingdom.

17 January 2021 12	Reading	1–1	Arsenal	Reading
14:00 GMT (UTC)	Bruton 5'; Fishlock (yellow card) 58'	Report	Wubben-Moy (yellow card) 26'; Miedema 40'; Wälti (yellow card) 76'	Stadium: Madejski Stadium; Attendance: 0 Referee: Lisa Benn
Note: Match played behind closed doors due to the COVID-19 pandemic in the United Kingdom.

23 January 2021 13	Aston Villa	2–2	Reading	Walsall
12:30 GMT (UTC)	N'Dow (yellow card) 30'; Iwabuchi 55'; Larsen (yellow card) 80'; Silva 90+1'	Report	James 3'; Rowe 57'	Stadium: Bescot Stadium; Attendance: 0 Referee: Kirsty Dowle
Note: Match played behind closed doors due to the COVID-19 pandemic in the United Kingdom.

7 February 2021 14	Manchester United	0–2	Reading	Leigh
12:30 GMT (UTC)	Sigsworth (yellow card) 74'	Report	Harding 63'; Carter 65'; Mitchell (yellow card) 85'	Stadium: Leigh Sports Village; Attendance: 0 Referee: Edward Duckworth
Note: Match played behind closed doors due to the COVID-19 pandemic in the United Kingdom.

14 February 2021 15	Reading	1–1	Everton	Reading
14:00 GMT (UTC)	Rowe 34'; Bartrip (yellow card) 90+2'	Report	Stringer (yellow card) 24'; Sørensen 77'	Stadium: Madejski Stadium; Attendance: 0 Referee: Stacey Pearson
Note: Match played behind closed doors due to the COVID-19 pandemic in the United Kingdom.

8 March 2021 16	Bristol City	3–2	Reading	Bath
20:15 GMT (UTC)	Wellings 24'; Daniëls (yellow card) 50'; Purfield 58'; Salmon 79'	Report	Harries 13'; Rowe 73' (yellow card) 40' (yellow-red card) 90+3'	Stadium: Twerton Park; Attendance: 0 Referee: Rebecca Welch
Note: Match played behind closed doors due to the COVID-19 pandemic in the United Kingdom.

14 March 2021 17	Reading	0–0	Tottenham Hotspur	Reading
12:30 GMT (UTC)	Williams (yellow card) 36'	Report		Stadium: Madejski Stadium; Attendance: 0 Referee: Christiana Hattersley
Note: Match played behind closed doors due to the COVID-19 pandemic in the United Kingdom.

27 March 2021 18	Manchester City	1–0	Reading	Manchester
17:30 GMT (UTC)	Bronze (yellow card) 45'; Kelly 87'	Report	Harding (yellow card) 40'; Woodham (yellow card) 47'; Eikeland (yellow card) 78'; Cooper (yellow card) 86'; Bartrip (yellow card) 90+2'	Stadium: Academy Stadium; Attendance: 0 Referee: Stacey Pearson
Note: Match played behind closed doors due to the COVID-19 pandemic in the United Kingdom.

3 April 2021 19	Reading	0–5	West Ham United	Reading
14:00 BST (UTC+1)	Cooper (yellow card) 45'	Report	Dali 7'; Svitková 10'; Thomas 11', 29', 37'; Flaherty (yellow card) 72'; Longhurst (yellow card) 89'	Stadium: Madejski Stadium; Attendance: 0 Referee: Kirsty Dowle
Note: Match played behind closed doors due to the COVID-19 pandemic in the United Kingdom.

25 April 2021 20	Birmingham City	1–1	Reading	Solihull
14:00 BST (UTC+1)	Mace 6'; Littlejohn (yellow card) 78'	Report	Bartrip (yellow card) 28'; Williams (yellow card) 52'; Rowe 63'	Stadium: Damson Park; Attendance: 0 Referee: Lucy May
Note: Match played behind closed doors due to the COVID-19 pandemic in the United Kingdom.

2 May 2021 21	Reading	3–2	Brighton & Hove Albion	Reading
14:00 BST (UTC+1)	Williams 36' (pen.); Carter 43'; Harding 55'	Report	Lee 44', 45'	Stadium: Madejski Stadium; Attendance: 0 Referee: Jane Simms
Note: Match played behind closed doors due to the COVID-19 pandemic in the United Kingdom.

9 May 2021 22	Chelsea	5–0	Reading	Kingston upon Thames
14:30 BST (UTC+1)	Leupolz 2'; Kirby 43', 57'; Kerr 71'; Cuthbert 75'	Report		Stadium: Kingsmeadow; Attendance: 0 Referee: Stacey Pearson
Note: Match played behind closed doors due to the COVID-19 pandemic in the United Kingdom.

==== Table ====
Pos	Team	Pld	W	D	L	GF	GA	GD	Pts
5	Everton	22	9	5	8	39	30	+9	32
6	Brighton & Hove Albion	22	8	3	11	21	41	−20	27
7	Reading	22	5	9	8	25	41	−16	24
8	Tottenham Hotspur	22	5	5	12	18	41	−23	20
9	West Ham United	22	3	6	13	21	39	−18	15

Source: FA WSL
Rules for classification: 1) Points; 2) Goal difference; 3) Number of goals scored.

=== FA Cup ===
18 April 2021 Fourth round	Reading	2–3 (a.e.t.)	Tottenham Hotspur	Reading
14:00 BST (UTC+1)	F. Williams 12'; Rowe 49' (yellow card) 119'	Report	Kennedy 20'; R. Williams 48'; Naz 93'; Ayane (yellow card) 95'	Stadium: Madejski Stadium; Attendance: 0 Referee: Lisa Benn
Note: Match played behind closed doors due to the COVID-19 pandemic in the United Kingdom.

=== League Cup ===
==== Group stage ====
7 October 2020 1	Reading	4–0	Charlton Athletic	Reading
19:30 BST (UTC+1)	Carter 27'; Harding 68', 70'; Chaplen 90+2' (yellow card) 90+2'	Report	Watling (yellow card) 38'	Stadium: Madejski Stadium; Attendance: 0 Referee: Emily Heaslip
Note: Match played behind closed doors due to the COVID-19 pandemic in the United Kingdom.

4 November 2020 2	West Ham United	3–0	Reading	Dagenham
19:30 GMT (UTC)	Lehmann 14' (yellow card) 45'; Flaherty (yellow card) 29' van Egmond 51'; Daly 58'	Report		Stadium: Victoria Road; Attendance: 0 Referee: Aji Ajibola
Note: Match played behind closed doors due to the COVID-19 pandemic in the United Kingdom.

18 November 2020 3	Brighton & Hove Albion	0–2	Reading	Crawley
19:30 GMT (UTC)	Simpkins (yellow card) 58'	Report	Harding 28'; Fishlock (yellow card) 41'; Eikeland 73'	Stadium: Broadfield Stadium; Attendance: 0
Note: Match played behind closed doors due to the COVID-19 pandemic in the United Kingdom.

Pos	Team	Pld	W	WPEN	LPEN	L	GF	GA	GD	Pts	Qualification
1	West Ham United	3	2	1	0	0	9	2	+7	8	Advanced to knock-out stage
2	Reading	3	2	0	0	1	6	3	+3	6	Possible knock-out stage based on ranking
3	Brighton & Hove Albion	2	0	0	1	1	2	4	−2	1	
4	Charlton Athletic	2	0	0	0	2	0	8	−8	0	

Source: thefa.com
Rules for classification: 1) Points; 2) Goal difference; 3) Number of goals scored; 4) Number of wins; 5) Head-to-head record

Pos	Grp	Team	Pld	W	WPEN	LPEN	L	GF	GA	GD	Pts	PPG	Qualification
1	A	Durham	3	2	0	1	0	12	3	+9	7	2.33	Advanced to knock-out stage
2	F	Crystal Palace	3	2	0	0	1	10	6	+4	6	2.00	Advanced to knock-out stage
3	D	Reading	3	2	0	0	1	6	3	+3	6	2.00	
4	E	Birmingham City	2	1	0	1	0	1	0	+1	4	2.00	
5	C	Everton	3	2	0	0	1	3	3	0	6	2.00	
6	B	Arsenal	3	1	1	0	1	7	6	+1	5	1.67	

Source: thefa.com

== Squad statistics ==
As of match played 9 May 2021

=== Appearances ===
No.	Pos	Nat	Player	Total		WSL		FA Cup		League Cup	
No.	Pos	Nat	Player	Apps	Goals	Apps	Goals	Apps	Goals	Apps	Goals
1	GK	(Republic of Ireland) IRL	Grace Moloney	25	0	22	0	1	0	2	0
2	DF	(Norway) NOR	Kristine Leine	22	0	12+6	0	0+1	0	2+1	0
3	DF	(Scotland) SCO	Emma Mitchell	17	0	14	0	0	0	2+1	0
4	MF	(England) ENG	Fara Williams	19	4	14+3	3	1	1	0+1	0
5	DF	(England) ENG	Molly Bartrip	25	0	20+1	0	1	0	3	0
6	MF	(Wales) WAL	Angharad James	26	1	22	1	1	0	3	0
7	FW	(South Korea) KOR	Jeon Ga-eul	6	0	1+3	0	0+1	0	1	0
9	FW	(Norway) NOR	Amalie Eikeland	26	3	19+3	2	0+1	0	3	1
10	FW	(England) ENG	Lauren Bruton	18	3	7+8	3	0	0	2+1	0
11	MF	(Wales) WAL	Natasha Harding	26	6	22	3	1	0	2+1	3
14	DF	(England) ENG	Deanna Cooper	24	0	20+1	0	1	0	2	0
16	GK	(New Zealand) NZL	Erin Nayler	1	0	0	0	0	0	1	0
18	FW	(England) ENG	Danielle Carter	25	4	14+7	3	1	0	2+1	1
19	FW	(England) ENG	Brooke Chaplen	11	2	4+4	1	0	0	2+1	1
23	MF	(Wales) WAL	Rachel Rowe	23	6	12+7	5	1	1	2+1	0
28	DF	(Wales) WAL	Lily Woodham	15	0	10+2	0	1	0	1+1	0
31	DF	(Wales) WAL	Bethan Roberts	7	0	4+2	0	1	0	0	0
36	FW	(England) ENG	Emma Harries	20	1	7+9	1	1	0	0+3	0
Players away from the club on loan:
Players who appeared for Reading but left during the season:
8	MF	(Wales) WAL	Jess Fishlock	22	2	18+1	2	0	0	3	0

=== Goal scorers ===
Place	Position	Nation	Number	Name	WSL	FA Cup	League Cup	Total
1	MF	(Wales)	23	Rachel Rowe	5	1	0	6
1	MF	(Wales)	11	Natasha Harding	3	0	3	6
3	MF	(England)	4	Fara Williams	3	1	0	4
3	FW	(England)	18	Danielle Carter	3	0	1	4
5	FW	(England)	10	Lauren Bruton	3	0	0	3
5	FW	(Norway)	9	Amalie Eikeland	2	0	1	3
7	MF	(Wales)	8	Jess Fishlock	2	0	0	2
7	FW	(England)	19	Brooke Chaplen	1	0	1	2
9	MF	(Wales)	6	Angharad James	1	0	0	1
9	FW	(England)	36	Emma Harries	1	0	0	1
9				Own goal	1	0	0	1
Total					25	2	6	33

=== Clean sheets ===
Place	Position	Nation	Number	Name	WSL	FA Cup	League Cup	Total
1	GK	(Republic of Ireland)	1	Grace Moloney	3	0	2	5
Total					3	0	2	5

=== Disciplinary record ===
Number	Nation	Position	Name	WSL		FA Cup		League Cup		Total	
Number	Nation	Position	Name	Booked	Sent off (straight red)	Booked	Sent off (straight red)	Booked	Sent off (straight red)	Booked	Sent off (straight red)
1	(Republic of Ireland)	GK	Grace Moloney	1	0	0	0	0	0	1	0
2	(Norway)	DF	Kristine Leine	2	0	0	0	0	0	2	0
3	(Scotland)	DF	Emma Mitchell	2	0	0	0	0	0	2	0
4	(England)	MF	Fara Williams	2	0	0	0	0	0	2	0
5	(England)	DF	Molly Bartrip	6	0	0	0	0	0	6	0
9	(Norway)	FW	Amalie Eikeland	1	0	0	0	0	0	1	0
10	(England)	FW	Lauren Bruton	1	0	0	0	0	0	1	0
11	(Wales)	MF	Natasha Harding	4	0	0	0	0	0	4	0
14	(England)	DF	Deanna Cooper	3	0	0	0	0	0	3	0
18	(England)	FW	Danielle Carter	1	0	0	0	0	0	1	0
19	(England)	FW	Brooke Chaplen	0	0	0	0	1	0	1	0
23	(Wales)	MF	Rachel Rowe	3	1	1	0	0	0	4	1
28	(Wales)	DF	Lily Woodham	1	0	0	0	0	0	1	0
Players away on loan:
Players who left Reading during the season:
8	(Wales)	MF	Jess Fishlock	2	0	0	0	1	0	3	0
Total				29	1	1	0	2	0	32	1
