= 2026–27 Crystal Palace F.C. (Women) season =

Crystal Palace
2026–27 season
- Head coach: Jo Potter
- Stadium: Gander Green Lane, Sutton
Home colours	Away colours	Third colours

The 2026–27 Crystal Palace F.C. (Women) season is the club's 34th in existence, and their first season back in the top flight, having gained promotion to the Women's Super League.

== Season summary ==
Crystal Palace were promoted as 2025–26 Women's Super League 2 as runner-ups on the final day of the season. On 24 July 2026, it was announced that Palace would play Oxford United in a pre-season friendly. On 27 July 2026, it was announced that Palace would play Real Madrid in a pre-season friendly.

On 6 September 2026, following Palace's first Women's Super League (WSL) match of the season, it was announced that WSL Football had launched an investigation into a breach of rules that occurred during the game. During the match—a 1–0 home victory over Everton—Palace used four substitution windows; league regulations allow a maximum of three windows to be used. The investigation will involve both clubs (Crystal Palace and Everton) as well as Pro Ref, the referee body. The fourth change, in which Kirsty Howat entered the pitch in the 97th minute, occurred while Palace were leading 1–0 with six minutes of stoppage time remaining. Katie Whyatt of The Athletic reported that the referee (Megan Wilson) and her team of officials would be stood down for the second round of WSL and WSL 2 fixtures.

== Squad ==
As of 6 September 2026

No.	Player	Nationality	Date of birth (age)	Signed from	Since
Goalkeepers
26	Pauline Peyraud-Magnin	(France)	17 March 1992 (age 34)	(United States) Denver Summit FC (loan)	2026
30	Shae Yanez	(United States)	22 May 1997 (age 29)	(England) Bristol City	2024
56	Comfort Erhabor	(Nigeria)	26 April 2005 (age 21)	(England) Portsmouth	2026
Defenders
6	Aimee Everett (captain)	(England)	2 August 2001 (age 25)	(England) Leicester City	2021
12	Caitlin Cosme	(Puerto Rico)	19 January 1999 (age 27)	(France) FC Nantes	2026
16	Hayley Ladd	(Wales)	6 October 1993 (age 33)	(England) Everton	2026
22	Teyah Goldie	(England)	27 June 2004 (age 22)	(England) London City Lionesses (loan)	2026
29	Allyson Swaby	(Jamaica)	3 October 1996 (age 30)	(Italy) AC Milan	2025
32	Molly Bartrip	(England)	1 June 1996 (age 30)	(England) Tottenham Hotspur	2026
Midfielders
3	Jamie-Lee Napier	(Scotland)	6 April 2000 (age 26)	(England) Bristol City	2025
4	Sierra Enge	(United States)	23 February 2000 (age 26)	(France) RC Strasbourg	2026
5	My Cato	(Sweden)	24 April 2002 (age 24)	(Sweden) IFK Norrköping	2024
14	Josie Green	(Wales)	25 April 1993 (age 33)	(England) Leicester City	2024
15	Hayley Nolan	(Republic of Ireland)	7 March 1997 (age 29)	(England) London City Lionesses	2023
18	Justine Vanhaevermaet	(Belgium)	29 April 1992 (age 34)	(England) Everton	2025
24	Shanade Hopcroft	(Republic of Ireland)	4 October 1997 (age 29)	(England) Birmingham City	2026
25	Fūka Tsunoda	(Japan)	24 October 2004 (age 22)	(England) Brighton & Hove Albion (loan)	2026
61	Amy Moynihan	(England)	-	Academy	2026
Forwards
7	Lexi Lloyd-Smith	(England)	5 March 2003 (age 23)	(England) Bristol City	2026
8	Molly-Mae Sharpe	(England)	11 March 1998 (age 28)	(England) Durham	2021
9	Bethany England	(England)	3 June 1994 (age 32)	(England) Tottenham Hotspur	2026
10	Kirsty Howat	(Scotland)	19 May 1997 (age 29)	(Scotland) Rangers	2025
11	Ashleigh Weerden	(Suriname)	7 June 1999 (age 27)	(Netherlands) AFC Ajax	2024
17	Annabel Blanchard	(England)	7 May 2001 (age 25)	(England) Blackburn Rovers.	2022
19	Abbie Larkin	(Republic of Ireland)	27 April 2005 (age 21)	(Scotland) Glasgow City	2024
27	Shannon O'Brien	(England)	5 October 2001 (age 25)	(England) Leicester City	2026

=== Contract renewals ===
No.	Pos.	Nat.	Name	Date	Until	Ref.
8	FW	(England)	Molly-Mae Sharpe	14 May 2026	30 June 2028	
27	FW	(Republic of Ireland)	Abbie Larkin	22 May 2026	30 June 2028	
14	MF	(Wales)	Josie Green	9 July 2026	30 June 2027	
30	GK	(United States)	Shae Yanez	11 July 2026	30 June 2028	
15	MF	(Republic of Ireland)	Hayley Nolan	11 July 2026	30 June 2028	
11	FW	(Netherlands)	Ashleigh Weerden	12 July 2026	30 June 2028	

== Transfers ==
=== In ===
Date	Pos.	No.	Player	From	Ref.
3 July 2026	MF	4	(United States) Sierra Enge	(France) Strasbourg	
15 July 2026	FW	9	Bethany England	(England) Tottenham Hotspur	
16 July 2026	FW	7	(England) Lexi Lloyd-Smith	(England) Bristol City	
30 July 2026	FW	27	(England) Shannon O'Brien	(England) Leicester City	
3 August 2026	DF	32	(England) Molly Bartrip	(England) Tottenham Hotspur	
3 September 2026	MF	24	(Republic of Ireland) Shanade Hopcroft	(England) Birmingham City	
15 September 2026	DF	12	(Puerto Rico) Caitlin Cosme	(France) FC Nantes	

=== Out ===
Date	Position	Player	To	Ref.
19 May 2026	MF	(Scotland) Chloe Arthur	(Scotland) Celtic	
20 May 2026	MF	(New Zealand) Indiah-Paige Riley	(New Zealand) Wellington Phoenix	
22 May 2026	MF	(Republic of Ireland) Ruesha Littlejohn	Free agent	
22 May 2026	DF	(England) Zara Bailey	(England) Watford	
10 June 2026	FW	(Wales) Elise Hughes	(England) Sunderland	
14 July 2026	FW	(Republic of Ireland) Kelly Brady	(Scotland) Glasgow City F.C.	

=== Loans in ===
Date	Pos.	No.	Player	From	Until	Ref.
10 July 2026	DF	22	(England) Teyah Goldie	(England) London City Lionesses	30 June 2027	
24 August 2026	MF	25	(Japan) Fuka Tsunoda	(England) Brighton & Hove Albion	30 June 2027	

== Pre-season ==
26 July 2026 Friendly	Oxford United	0–1	Crystal Palace
		Report	Ashleigh Weerden	Attendance: Behind closed doors

5 August 2026 Friendly	(Spain) Real Madrid	2–0	Crystal Palace	Marbella Football Center
	Keukelaar 32'; O'Brien 69' (o.g.)	Report		Attendance: Behind closed doors

8 August 2026 Friendly	(England) Arsenal	2–1	Crystal Palace	Sobha Realty Training Centre
	Baum; Kelly	Report	Hopcroft	Attendance: Behind closed doors

== Women's Super League ==
=== League table ===
Pos	Team	Pld	W	D	L	GF	GA	GD	Pts	Qualification or relegation
10	Liverpool	11	3	3	5	17	16	+1	12	
11	Everton	11	3	3	5	8	11	−3	12	
12	Crystal Palace	11	2	3	6	12	27	−15	9	
13	Birmingham City	11	1	3	7	12	24	−12	6	Qualification for WSL2 promotion/relegation play-off
14	Charlton Athletic	11	0	1	10	6	31	−25	1	Relegation to the WSL2

Updated to match(es) played on 22 November 2026. Source: Women's Super League Table
Rules for classification: 1) Points; 2) Goal difference; 3) Number of goals scored.

=== Matches ===
The league schedule was released on 30 July 2026.

Win Draw Loss Fixtures

6 September 2026 1	Crystal Palace	1–0	Everton	Sutton
14:00 BST	Lloyd-Smith 34'; Goldie (yellow card) 44'; Bartrip (yellow card) 51'; Hopcroft (yellow card) 74'	Report	Kramžar (yellow card) 51'; Mace (yellow card) 68'	Stadium: Gander Green Lane; Attendance: 1,274; Referee: Megan Wilson

13 September 2026 2	Arsenal	0–0	Crystal Palace	Holloway
14:45 BST			Goldie (yellow card) 44'; Swaby (yellow card) 83'; O'Brien (yellow card) 85'	Stadium: Emirates Stadium; Attendance: 23,900; Referee: Declan Brown

20 September 2026 3	Crystal Palace	0–7	Tottenham Hotspur	Selhurst
14:00 BST	Tsunoda (red card) 7'	Report	Hanson (yellow card) 27'; Holdt 49', 61', 73'; Pelova 76', 90'; Martinez 79'; Nildén 86'	Stadium: Selhurst Park; Referee: Sophie Dennington

27 September 2026 4	Birmingham City	3–3	Crystal Palace	Bordesley
14:00 BST	Hurtré 1', 33'; Amano 87'	Report	Hopcroft 30'; England 70'; Lloyd-Smith 77'	Stadium: St Andrew's; Referee: Amy Fearn

4 October 2026 5	Aston Villa	1–1	Crystal Palace	Aston
14:00 BST	Maritz 55'	Report	Lloyd-Smith (yellow card) 35'; Larkin 74'	Stadium: Villa Park; Attendance: 1,953; Referee: Abigail Byrne

18 October 2026 6	Crystal Palace	0–1	West Ham United	Sutton
14:00 BST	Lloyd-Smith (yellow card) 32'; Napier (yellow card) 56'; Enge (yellow card) 59'	Report	Gago 30'; Codina (yellow card) 77'	Stadium: Gander Green Lane; Referee: Lisa Benn

25 October 2026 7	Crystal Palace	1–3	Chelsea	Sutton
14:00 GMT	Bartrip 20'; Blanchard (yellow card) 44'; Ladd (yellow card) 70'	Report	Kaptein (yellow card) 44'; McCabe (yellow card) 44'; Malard 51', 75'; Bronze (yellow card) 63'; Baltimore 90' (pen.)	Stadium: Gander Green Lane; Referee: Alice Parker

1 November 2026 8	Brighton	2–1	Crystal Palace	Crawley
14:00 GMT	Mpomé (yellow card) 36'; Hayes 59'; Peskett 64'	Report	Blanchard 34'; Enge (yellow card) 90'	Stadium: Broadfield Stadium; Attendance: 1,690; Referee: Phoebe Cross

8 November 2026 9	Crystal Palace	3–2	Charlton Athletic	Sutton
14:00 GMT	Lloyd-Smith 57'; Larkin (yellow card) 60'; Everett 81'; England 90'	Report	Flannery (yellow card) 59'; N'Dow 73'; Davidson 74'	Stadium: Gander Green Lane; Referee: Amy Fearn

14 November 2026 10	Manchester United	2–0	Crystal Palace	Leigh
12:45 GMT	Le Tissier 18'; Terland 65'; Medina (yellow card) 81'		England (yellow card) 11'	Stadium: Leigh Sports Village; Attendance: 2,689; Referee: Adewunmi Soneye

21 November 2026 11	London City Lionesses	6–2	Crystal Palace	Bromley
17:15 GMT	van de Donk 14', 54'; Pérez (yellow card) 38'; Putellas 51', 89'; Kennedy 73'; Goodwin 77'; León (yellow card) 84'	Report	Larkin 24'; Napier (yellow card) 56'; Blanchard 64'; Everett (yellow card) 79'	Stadium: Hayes Lane; Attendance: 4,074; Referee: Grace Lowe

13 December 2026 12	Crystal Palace	v	Manchester City	Sutton
14:00 GMT				Stadium: Gander Green Lane

20 December 2026 13	Liverpool	v	Crystal Palace	St Helens
14:00 GMT				Stadium: St Helens Stadium

10 January 2027 14	Crystal Palace	v	Manchester United	Sutton
14:00 GMT				Stadium: Gander Green Lane

20 January 2027 15	Crystal Palace	v	Aston Villa	Sutton
19:00 GMT				Stadium: Gander Green Lane

24 January 2027 16	Chelsea	v	Crystal Palace	Fulham
14:00 GMT				Stadium: Stamford Bridge

31 January 2027 17	Charlton Athletic	v	Crystal Palace	Charlton
14:00 GMT				Stadium: The Valley

7 February 2027 18	Crystal Palace	v	London City Lionesses	Sutton
14:00 GMT				Stadium: Gander Green Lane

14 February 2027 19	Crystal Palace	v	Arsenal	Sutton
14:00 GMT				Stadium: Gander Green Lane

14 March 2027 20	Everton	v	Crystal Palace	Liverpool
14:00 GMT				Stadium: Goodison Park

17 March 2027 21	Crystal Palace	v	Birmingham City	Sutton
20:00 GMT				Stadium: Gander Green Lane

27 March 2027 22	Manchester City	v	Crystal Palace	Manchester
14:00 GMT				Stadium: Academy Stadium

4 April 2027 23	Tottenham Hotspur	v	Crystal Palace	Tottenham
14:00 BST				Stadium: Tottenham Hotspur Stadium

2 May 2027 24	Crystal Palace	v	Brighton	Sutton
14:00 BST				Stadium: Gander Green Lane

9 May 2027 25	Crystal Palace	v	Liverpool	Sutton
14:00 BST				Stadium: Gander Green Lane

22 May 2027 26	West Ham United	v	Crystal Palace
12:00 BST

== Women's FA Cup ==
As a member of the first tier, Crystal Palace entered the FA Cup in the fourth round proper.

== WSL Players Cup ==
Following the competition's restructuring, Crystal Palace were drawn in the Southern Region for the league stage of the competition.

Win Draw Loss Fixtures

23 September 2026 1	Crystal Palace	1–0	Watford	Sutton
19:00 BST	S. O'Brien 82'	Report		Stadium: VBS Community Stadium; Attendance: 195; Referee: Ryan Atkin

30 September 2026 2	Crystal Palace	3–0	Charlton Athletic	Sutton
19:00 BST	Hopcroft 22'; Howat 62'; Bartrip (yellow card) 65'; Lloyd-Smith 90+3'	Report		Stadium: VBS Community Stadium; Attendance: 264; Referee: Lisa Benn

21 October 2026 3	Southampton	3–2	Crystal Palace	Eastleigh
19:00 BST	Jupp 17'; Brazil 39'; Collett 45+2'	Report	Blanchard 9', 18' (pen.)	Stadium: Silverlake Stadium; Referee: Sophie Dennington

28 October 2026 4	London City Lionesses	4–2	Crystal Palace	Bromley
19:00 GMT	Goodwin 44', 59', 74'; Godfrey 84'	Report	Blanchard 82'; O'Brien 90+2'	Stadium: Copperjax Community Stadium; Attendance: 1,284; Referee: Abigail Byrne

11 November 2026 5	Tottenham Hotspur	v	Crystal Palace	Leyton
19:00 GMT				Stadium: Brisbane Road

16 December 2026 6	Crystal Palace	v	Wolverhampton Wanderers	Sutton
19:00 GMT				Stadium: Sutton United

== Squad statistics ==
As of match played 27 September 2026

=== Appearances ===
No.	Pos	Nat	Player	Total		Women's Super League		FA Cup		WSL Players Cup	
No.	Pos	Nat	Player	Apps	Goals	Apps	Goals	Apps	Goals	Apps	Goals
3	MF	(Scotland) SCO	Jamie-Lee Napier	4	0	4+0	0	0+0	0	0+0	0
4	MF	(United States) USA	Sierra Enge	3	0	0+2	0	0+0	0	1+0	0
5	MF	(Sweden) SWE	My Cato	0	0	0+0	0	0+0	0	0+0	0
6	DF	(England) ENG	Aimee Everett	5	0	4+0	0	0+0	0	0+1	0
7	FW	(England) ENG	Lexi Lloyd-Smith	5	2	4+0	2	0+0	0	0+1	0
8	FW	(England) ENG	Molly-Mae Sharpe	2	0	0+1	0	0+0	0	1+0	0
9	FW	(England) ENG	Beth England	4	1	3+0	1	0+0	0	1+0	0
10	FW	(Scotland) SCO	Kirsty Howat	4	0	0+3	0	0+0	0	1+0	0
11	FW	(Suriname) SUR	Ashleigh Weerden	3	0	0+2	0	0+0	0	1+0	0
12	DF	(Puerto Rico) PUR	Caitlin Cosme	1	0	0+0	0	0+0	0	1+0	0
14	MF	(Wales) WAL	Josie Green	0	0	0+0	0	0+0	0	0+0	0
15	MF	(Republic of Ireland) IRL	Hayley Nolan	1	0	0+0	0	0+0	0	1+0	0
16	DF	(Wales) WAL	Hayley Ladd	0	0	0+0	0	0+0	0	0+0	0
17	FW	(England) ENG	Annabel Blanchard	4	0	4+0	0	0+0	0	0+0	0
18	MF	(Belgium) BEL	Justine Vanhaevermaet	0	0	0+0	0	0+0	0	0+0	0
19	FW	(Republic of Ireland) IRL	Abbie Larkin	5	0	1+3	0	0+0	0	1+0	0
22	DF	(England) ENG	Teyah Goldie	5	0	4+0	0	0+0	0	0+1	0
24	FW	(England) ENG	Shanade Hopcroft	4	1	4+0	1	0+0	0	0+0	0
25	MF	(Japan) JPN	Fūka Tsunoda	3	0	3+0	0	0+0	0	0+0	0
26	GK	(France) FRA	Pauline Peyraud-Magnin	4	0	4+0	0	0+0	0	0+0	0
27	FW	(England) ENG	Shannon O'Brien	5	0	4+0	0	0+0	0	0+1	0
29	DF	(Jamaica) JAM	Allyson Swaby	5	0	1+3	0	0+0	0	1+0	0
30	GK	(United States) USA	Shae Yanez	1	0	0+0	0	0+0	0	1+0	0
32	DF	(England) ENG	Molly Bartrip	4	0	4+0	0	0+0	0	0+0	0
56	GK	(Nigeria) NGR	Comfort Erhabor	0	0	0+0	0	0+0	0	0+0	0
61	MF	(England) ENG	Amy Moynihan	1	0	0+0	0	0+0	0	1+0	0

=== Goals ===
Rank	No.	Player	Women's Super League	FA Cup	WSL Players Cup	Total
1	7	(England) Lexi Lloyd-Smith	2	0	0	2
2	9	Beth England	1	0	0	1
2	24	(England) Shanade Hopcroft	1	0	0	1
2	27	(England) Shannon O'Brien	0	0	1	1
Total			4	0	1	5

=== Assists ===
Rank	No.	Player	Women's Super League	FA Cup	WSL Players Cup	Total
1	8	(England) Molly-Mae Sharpe	0	0	1	1
Total			0	0	1	1

=== Clean sheets ===
Rank	No.	Player	Women's Super League	FA Cup	WSL Players Cup	Total
1	26	(France) Pauline Peyraud-Magnin	2	0	0	2
2	30	(United States) Shae Yanez	0	0	1	1
Total			2	0	1	3

=== Disciplinary record ===
No.	Pos.	Player	Women's Super League			FA Cup			WSL Players Cup			Total		
No.	Pos.	Player	Yellow card	(yellow card) (yellow-red card)	Red card	Yellow card	(yellow card) (yellow-red card)	Red card	Yellow card	(yellow card) (yellow-red card)	Red card	Yellow card	(yellow card) (yellow-red card)	Red card
3	DF	(Scotland) Jamie-Lee Napier	1	0	0	0	0	0	0	0	0	1	0	0
11	MF	(Suriname) Ashleigh Weerden	0	0	0	0	0	0	1	0	0	1	0	0
15	DF	(Republic of Ireland) Hayley Nolan	0	0	0	0	0	0	1	0	0	1	0	0
22	DF	(England) Teyah Goldie	2	0	0	0	0	0	0	0	0	2	0	0
24	MF	(England) Shanade Hopcroft	1	0	0	0	0	0	0	0	0	1	0	0
25	MF	(Japan) Fūka Tsunoda	0	0	1	0	0	0	0	0	0	0	0	1
27	FW	(England) Shannon O'Brien	1	0	0	0	0	0	0	0	0	1	0	0
29	MF	(Jamaica) Allyson Swaby	1	0	0	0	0	0	0	0	0	1	0	0
32	DF	(England) Molly Bartrip	1	0	0	0	0	0	0	0	0	1	0	0
Total			7	0	1	0	0	0	2	0	0	9	0	1
