= Fara Williams =

English footballer (born 1984)

Fara Williams MBE
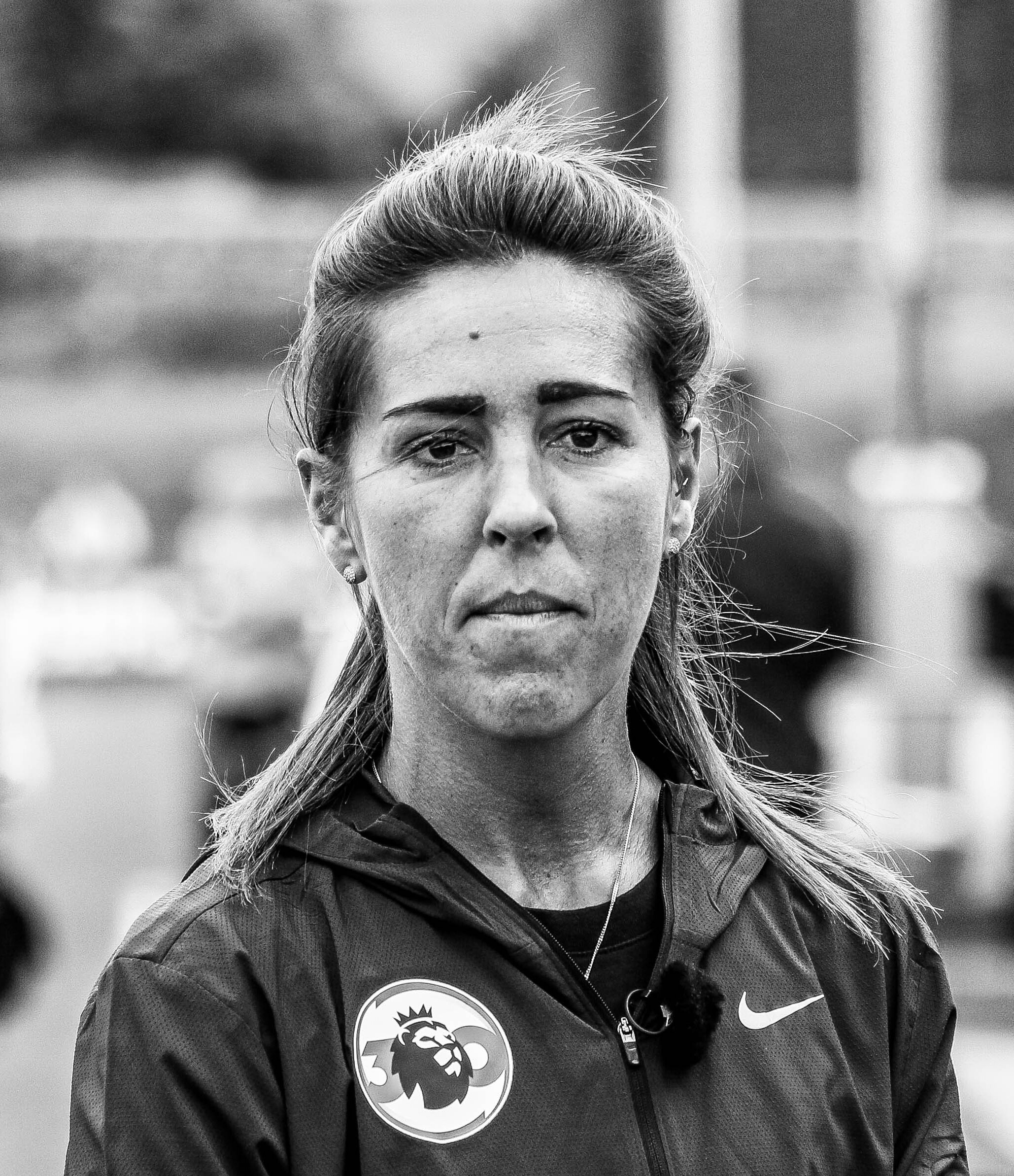
- Williams in 2022

Personal information
- Full name: Fara Tanya Franki Merrett
- Date of birth: 25 January 1984 (age 42)
- Place of birth: Battersea, London, England
- Height: 5 ft 5 in (1.64 m)
- Position: Midfielder

Youth career
- Chelsea

Senior career*
Years	Team	Apps	(Gls)
–2001	Chelsea		
2001–2004	Charlton Athletic		
2004–2012	Everton	122	(70)
2012–2015	Liverpool	35	(9)
2016–2017	Arsenal	22	(2)
2017–2021	Reading	67	(25)
Total		246	(106)

International career^{‡}
2001–2019	England	172	(40)
2012	Great Britain	5	(0)
Medal record
Women's football
Representing England
FIFA Women's World Cup
Bronze medal – third place	2015 Canada
- * Club domestic league appearances and goals as of 14:48, 6 February 2020 (UTC) ‡ National team caps and goals as of 16:08, 26 Liverpool Feds - 2023/2025 100 caps April 2021 (UTC)

Fara Tanya Franki Merrett MBE (born 25 January 1984), known professionally as Fara Williams, is an English former footballer who played as a midfielder. A consistent goalscorer and set-piece specialist, Williams was considered one of England's leading players.

Williams' club career started with Chelsea then she progressed to Charlton Athletic in 2001. She signed for Everton in 2004 and later became the captain of the club, winning the Premier League Cup in 2008 and the FA Women's Cup in 2010. After eight years with Everton, she signed for local rivals Liverpool in 2012 and won the league title in 2013 and 2014. Williams was named The Football Association (FA) Young Player of the Year in 2002, FA Players' Player of the Year in 2009 and FA International Player of the Year in both 2007 and 2009.

From her senior debut in 2001 until her retirement in 2019, Williams earned 172 caps for the England women's team, making her their highest capped player. She played at the 2005, 2009, 2013 and 2017 European Championships, as well as the World Cups in 2007, 2011 and 2015. Williams also featured for Great Britain at the 2012 Summer Olympics, earning five further caps taking her career total to 177 caps.

== Club career ==
Williams attended Shene School in Richmond, London and joined Chelsea under–14s at the age of 12. She scored 30 goals for Chelsea's first team in the 2000–01 season and signed for Charlton Athletic Ladies during the following season. She won Charlton's Player of the Year and the FA Women's Young Player of the Year in her first season, the 2001–02 season.

A back injury ruled Williams out of much of the 2002–03 season. In May 2003 Williams scored an unfortunate own goal three minutes after coming on as a substitute in Charlton's 3–0 FA Women's Cup final defeat to Fulham. She headed a corner from Fulham's Rachel Unitt – Williams' England teammate and then flatmate – into her own net.

In the 2003–04 season, Williams returned to form and was an important part of the Charlton Athletic side who challenged for all three domestic trophies. She started Charlton's second successive FA Women's Cup final in May 2004, but suffered another 3–0 defeat as Julie Fleeting scored a hat-trick for Arsenal. Although Arsenal also pipped Charlton to the League title by a single point, Williams collected an FA Women's Premier League Cup winners' medal when Charlton beat Fulham 1–0 at Underhill in March 2004.

Williams surprisingly moved to Everton Ladies in the summer of 2004, where fans gave her the nickname "Queen Fara". In 2004–05 Williams lost her third FA Women's Cup final in a row, to former club Charlton. She won another League Cup medal in the 2007–08 season as Everton defeated Arsenal at Brisbane Road. Williams missed two penalties, one in normal time and one in the shoot-out, as Everton were edged out by Leeds in the FA Women's Cup semi-final at Haig Avenue. In the 2008–09 season, Everton missed out on the League title on goal difference after a final day defeat to Arsenal. However, Williams' performances saw her voted FA Players' Player of the Year.

On 23 September 2009, Williams was picked in the Women's Professional Soccer (WPS) International Draft by Philadelphia Independence. She was due to join up with her England teammate Lianne Sanderson in the United States, before deciding to stay with Everton. Williams' loyalty was rewarded with another two Cup finals in 2010: a defeat to Leeds Carnegie in the Premier League Cup, in which Williams scored Everton's consolation, followed by a memorable extra–time win over Arsenal in the FA Women's Cup.

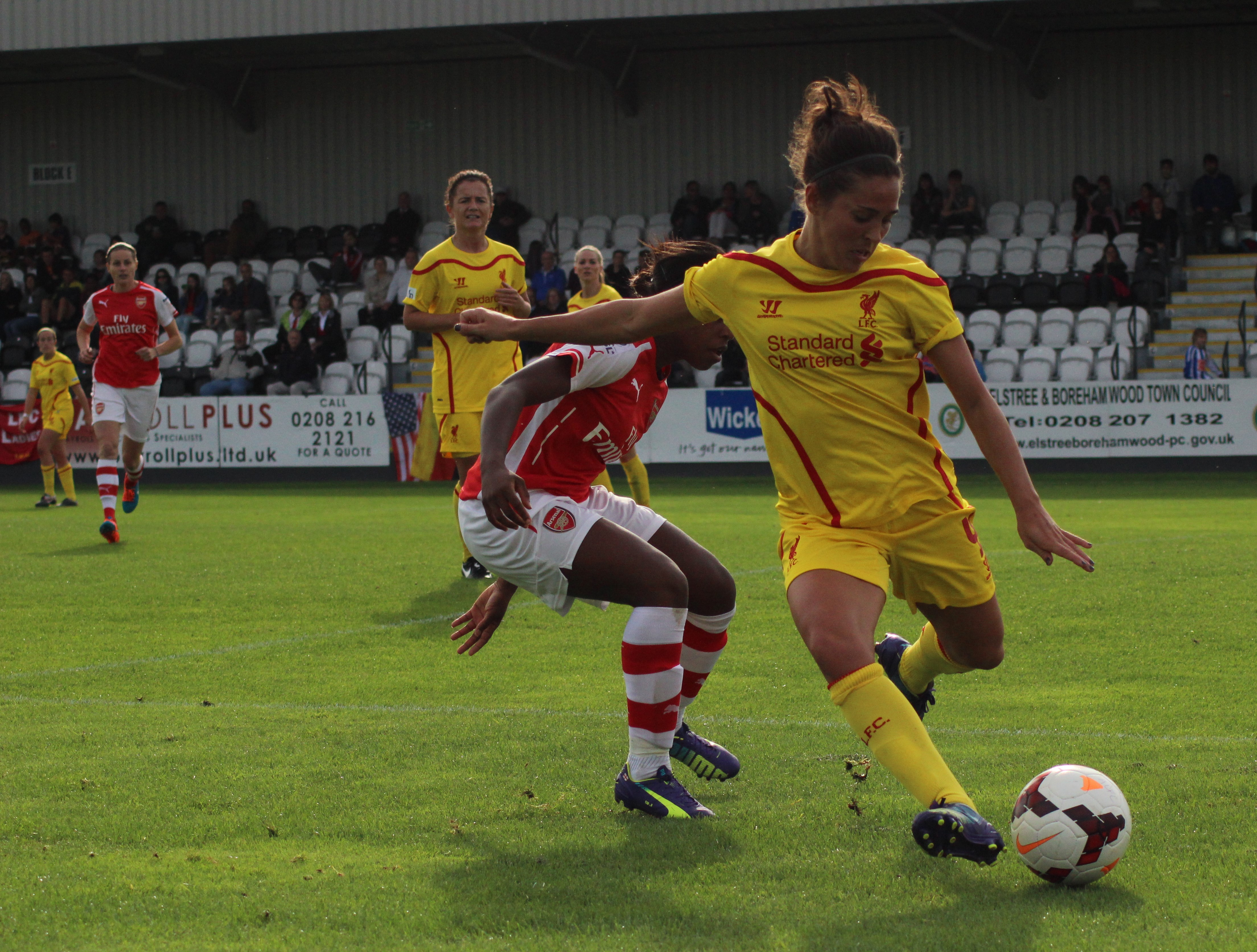
Williams playing for Liverpool at Arsenal in October 2014

In November 2012, Williams and Natasha Dowie left Everton for local rivals Liverpool, who were hoping to build a squad capable of ending Arsenal's dominance of English women's football. Liverpool beat Bristol Academy 2–0 on the final day to secure the 2013 FA WSL league title.

Liverpool retained their title in 2014, but were much less successful in 2015. They finished seventh of eight teams as Williams missed three months of the season with a hamstring injury and coach Matt Beard departed for American National Women's Soccer League (NWSL) club Boston Breakers.

On 5 January 2016, Liverpool confirmed that Williams would be leaving the club to sign for deposed former champions Arsenal Ladies. Williams said: "I have really enjoyed my time at Liverpool Ladies and will take away some absolutely fantastic memories. When I first joined the Club the team had finished bottom of the league so to win back to back league titles was an incredible achievement."

On 16 August 2017, she left Arsenal Women to join Women's Super League (WSL) rivals Reading on a two-year deal.

In May 2019, she signed a new contract with Reading.

On 26 April 2021, Williams announced that she would be retiring from the game at the end of the 2020–21 season.

== International career ==
=== England ===
Williams' senior England debut came aged 17 against Portugal in November 2001. During the return fixture in February 2002, her first start, Williams scored the opening goal from a free kick in a 3–0 win at Fratton Park.

Williams played in all three of England's group games at Women's Euro 2005, scoring a penalty in the 2–1 defeat to Denmark. She also scored five goals in helping England qualify for the World Cup in China, including two in the 13–0 win over Hungary. Williams forced the decisive own-goal in the play-off against France which sealed qualification.

She went on to play in all three of England's group games at the World Cup, and scored a penalty in England's 6–1 win over Argentina. However, she also picked up her second yellow card of the group stage in that match, and so missed the quarter-final defeat by the United States through suspension. On 23 May, Williams picked up the 2007 FA International Player of the Year Award.

On 8 May 2008, England played Belarus in the UEFA Women's Euro 2009 qualifying and Williams scored a hat-trick of long-range goals. In May 2009, Williams was again named FA International Player of the Year, and was also voted FA Players' Player of the Year.

At the Euro 2009 final tournament in Finland, Williams scored a penalty during England's first game against Italy. However, England lost the match 2–1 after Williams' error resulted in a red card for Casey Stoney. England improved and Williams, captain in the absence of the injured Faye White, scored in a 3–2 quarter final win over hosts Finland. She also featured in the semi-final win over the Netherlands and 6–2 final defeat by Germany.

Williams was England's top-scorer with seven goals during qualifying for the 2011 FIFA Women's World Cup. A knee injury sustained in a WSL match with Lincoln Ladies left her battling for fitness ahead of the finals. Despite this, Williams was "more than pleased" to be named in the squad on 10 June 2011. At the final tournament, she headed the first goal of England's campaign in the 1–1 draw with Mexico and also featured against New Zealand before being rested for the final group game, a 2–0 victory over Japan. Williams played 120 minutes in the quarter-final exit to France. She was not among the penalty takers in England's penalty shootout defeat.

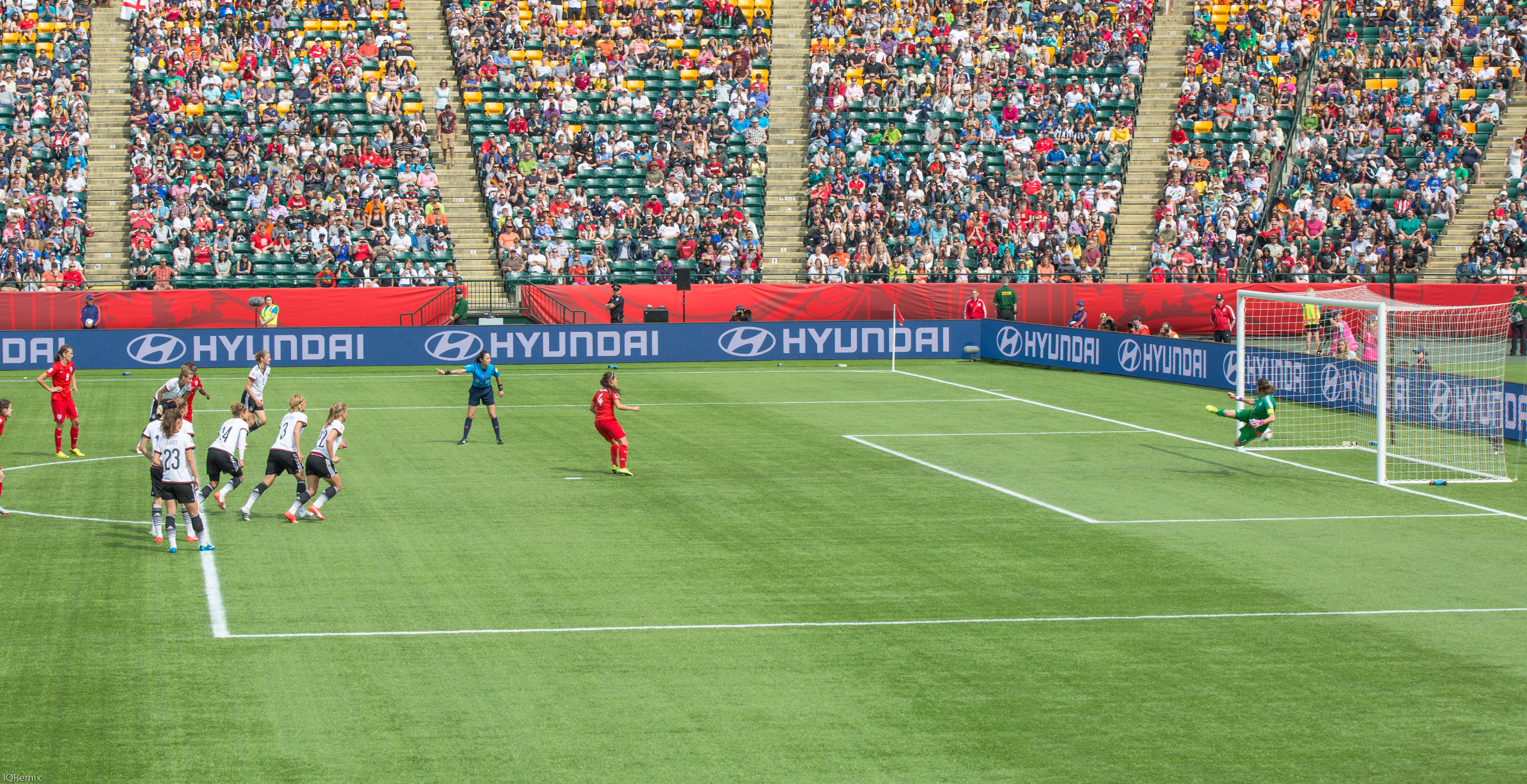
Williams fizzes a low penalty beyond Nadine Angerer at the 2015 FIFA Women's World Cup to inflict Germany's first ever defeat to England on the women's stage

Williams earned her 100th cap at the 2012 Cyprus Cup against Switzerland on 1 March 2012. England won the game 1–0 with Williams proud to score the only goal of the game: "It's a massive achievement to reach 100 caps and getting the goal made it extra special." She was part of the England squad which performed poorly at UEFA Women's Euro 2013 and was eliminated in the first round.

On 3 August 2014, Williams led the England team out against Sweden and became the most capped player in the history of English football, with 130 caps. England won the match 4–0 in Hartlepool.

At the 2015 FIFA Women's World Cup in Canada, Williams scored a 38th-minute penalty kick against Colombia, as England won 2–1 in Montreal on 17 June. In the semi-final in Edmonton on 2 July, Williams converted her second penalty of the tournament, in the 40th minute, to give England an equaliser against defending champions Japan. England lost the game 2–1. Two days later, and back in Edmonton, Williams scored another penalty, on this occasion in extra time, to give England the winning goal in a 1–0 victory over Germany. Her crucial goal gave England their first ever win over Germany and secured a bronze medal, the team's best ever finish at the FIFA Women's World Cup.

Williams was not included in England's squad for the 2019 FIFA Women's World Cup, but manager Phil Neville said her international career was not over.

She was allotted 140 when the FA announced their legacy numbers scheme to honour the 50th anniversary of England's inaugural international.

=== Great Britain ===
In June 2012, Williams was named in an 18-player Great Britain squad for the 2012 Summer Olympics. She made her debut for Great Britain in a goalless draw against Sweden, before featuring four times in the tournament, as the team were eliminated by Canada in the quarter-finals.

== Personal life ==
Williams was homeless for seven years during the early part of her football career. She was later employed by the FA as a skills coach. She has worked for the Homeless FA charity as a coach at Manchester United's The Cliff, and helping to select the England team for the Homeless World Cup.

Williams was appointed Member of the Order of the British Empire (MBE) in the 2016 New Year Honours for services to women's football and charity.

She supports Chelsea.

In December 2015, she married former Everton teammate Amy Kane, but they separated a short time later.

== Career statistics ==
=== Club ===
As of match played 2 May 2021

Appearances and goals by club, season and competition
Club	Season	League			National cup		League cup		Continental		Other		Total	
Club	Season	Division	Apps	Goals	Apps	Goals	Apps	Goals	Apps	Goals	Apps	Goals	Apps	Goals
Reading	2017–18	FA WSL 1	18	7	0	0	6	3	—		—		24	10
Reading	2018–19	WSL	20	11	4	5	5	3	—		—		29	19
Reading	2019–20	WSL	14	5	1	2	6	3	—		—		21	10
Reading	2020–21	WSL	16	3	1	1	1	0	—		—		18	4
Career total			68	26	6	8	18	9	—		—		92	43

=== International ===
Scores and results list England's goal tally first, score column indicates score after each Williams goal.

List of international goals scored by Fara Williams
No.	Date	Venue	Opponent	Score	Result	Competition
1	2 February 2002	Fratton Park, Portsmouth, England	Portugal		3–0	2003 FIFA World Cup qualification
2	6 March 2002	Paderne, Portugal	Scotland		4–1	Algarve Cup
3	14 November 2003	Deepdale, Preston, England	Scotland		5–0	Friendly
4	14 May 2004	London Road, Peterborough, England	Iceland		1–0	Friendly
5	19 August 2004	Memorial Ground, Bristol, England	Russia		1–2	Friendly
6	17 February 2005	National Hockey Stadium, Milton Keynes, England	Italy		4–1	Friendly
7	13 March 2005	Estádio Fernando Cabrita, Lagos, Portugal	Mexico		5–0	Algarve Cup
8	13 March 2005	Estádio Fernando Cabrita, Lagos, Portugal	Mexico		5–0	Algarve Cup
9	7 June 2005	Ewood Park, Blackburn, England	Denmark	1-0	1–2	2005 UEFA Championship
10	1 September 2005	Ertl-Glas-Stadion, Amstetten, Austria	Austria		4–1	2007 FIFA World Cup qualification
11	27 October 2005	Tapolca, Hungary	Hungary		13–0	2007 FIFA World Cup qualification
12	27 October 2005	Tapolca, Hungary	Hungary		13–0	2007 FIFA World Cup qualification
13	17 November 2005	FC Zwolle Stadion, Zwolle, Netherlands	Netherlands		1–0	2007 FIFA World Cup qualification
14	20 April 2006	Priestfield Stadium, Gillingham, England	Austria		4–0	2007 FIFA World Cup qualification
15	11 March 2007	Adams Park, High Wycombe, England	Scotland		1–0	Friendly
16	17 September 2007	Chengdu Longquanyi Football Stadium, Chengdu, China	Argentina	3-0	6–1	2007 FIFA World Cup
17	14 February 2008	Larnaca, Cyprus	Norway		2–1	Friendly
18	6 March 2008	Mourneview Park, Lurgan, Northern Ireland	Northern Ireland		2–0	2009 UEFA Championship qualification
19	8 May 2008	Darida, Minsk, Belarus	Belarus		6–1	2009 UEFA Championship qualification
20	8 May 2008	Darida, Minsk, Belarus	Belarus		6–1	2009 UEFA Championship qualification
21	8 May 2008	Darida, Minsk, Belarus	Belarus		6–1	2009 UEFA Championship qualification
22	5 March 2009	Larnaca, Cyprus	South Africa		6–0	2009 Cyprus Cup
23	12 March 2009	Larnaca, Cyprus	Canada		3–1	2009 Cyprus Cup
24	23 April 2009	New Meadow, Shrewsbury, England	Norway		3–0	Friendly
25	23 April 2009	New Meadow, Shrewsbury, England	Norway		3–0	Friendly
26	25 August 2009	Lahden Stadion, Lahti, Finland	Italy	1-0	1–2	2009 UEFA Championship
27	3 September 2009	Veritas Stadion, Turku, Finland	Finland	2-0	3–2	2009 UEFA Championship
28	25 October 2009	Bloomfield Road, Blackpool, England	Malta	2-0	8–0	2011 FIFA World Cup qualification
29	25 October 2009	Bloomfield Road, Blackpool, England	Malta	4-0	8–0	2011 FIFA World Cup qualification
30	25 October 2009	Bloomfield Road, Blackpool, England	Malta	5-0	8–0	2011 FIFA World Cup qualification
31	20 May 2010	Centenary Stadium, Ta' Qali, Malta	Malta	3-0	6–0	2011 FIFA World Cup qualification
32	20 May 2010	Centenary Stadium, Ta' Qali, Malta	Malta	6-0	6–0	2011 FIFA World Cup qualification
33	12 September 2010	New Meadow, Shrewsbury, England	Switzerland	1-0	2–0	2011 FIFA World Cup qualification
34	16 September 2010	Stadion Niedermatten, Wohlen, Switzerland	Switzerland	3-1	3–2	2011 FIFA World Cup qualification
35	27 June 2011	Volkswagen Arena, Wolfsburg, Germany	Mexico	1-0	1–1	2011 FIFA World Cup
36	1 March 2012	Larnaca, Cyprus	Switzerland	1-0	1–0	2012 Cyprus Women's Cup
37	31 October 2013	Adana 5 Ocak Stadium, Adana, Turkey	Turkey	2-0	4–0	2015 FIFA World Cup qualification
38	17 June 2015	Olympic Stadium, Montreal, Canada	Colombia	2-0	2–1	2015 FIFA World Cup
39	1 July 2015	Commonwealth Stadium, Edmonton, Canada	Japan	1-1	1–2	2015 FIFA World Cup
40	4 July 2015	Commonwealth Stadium, Edmonton, Canada	Germany	1-0	1–0	2015 FIFA World Cup

== Honours ==
Everton

- FA Women's Premier League Cup: 2007–08
- FA Women's Cup: 2009–10

Liverpool

- FA WSL: 2013, 2014

Arsenal

- FA Women's Cup: 2015–16

England

- Cyprus Cup: 2009, 2013, 2015
- UEFA Women's Championship runner-up: 2009
- FIFA Women's World Cup third place: 2015

Individual

- Liverpool Ladies Players' Player of the Season: 2015
- Women's Super League Hall of Fame: 2021

== See also ==
- List of women's footballers with 100 or more international caps
