= Gateshead College =

College in Gateshead, England

Coordinates: 54°58′0.08″N 1°35′52.94″W

- Type: Education
- Established: November 15, 1955
- Location: Gateshead, England
- Website: www.gateshead.ac.uk

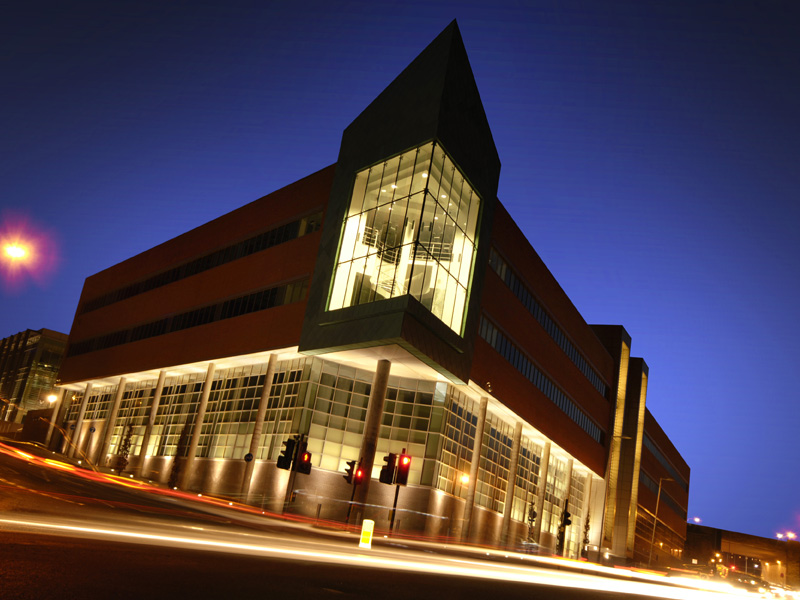
Gateshead College Baltic Campus at night

Gateshead College is a further education college in the town of Gateshead, England. It offers further education for 16-18 year olds as well as higher education, apprenticeships, part-time adult learning and training for employers. Established on November 15, 1955 at Durham Road in Low Fell, Gateshead, it was closed in January 2008 for its displacement to the new main site located at the Baltic Quayside in Gateshead.

== Founding and development ==
Originally established on November 15, 1955 and opened by the Duke of Edinburgh, the college was closed in January 2008 so as to be moved. The new £39 million main site is located at Baltic Quayside in Gateshead. The Academy for Sport based at Gateshead International Stadium and in Team Valley the Skills Academy for Automotive, Engineering, Manufacturing and Logistics were then also opened. In summer 2008, the Skills Academy for Construction was also opened in Team Valley.

More than £75 million has been spent developing six campuses, for academic and vocational courses.

The College has established a reputation for working in partnership with many organisations including the Chamber of Commerce, Nissan, sports teams including Gateshead Thunder and the Newcastle Vipers, and The Sage Gateshead and was chosen founder college for the National Skills Academy for Creative and Cultural Skills.

== Future intentions ==
Gateshead College develops training and facilities to support the North East's bid to become a hub for sustainability.

The College administers the Government's Plugged in Places project, through its Charge Your Car project. Gateshead College also established Zero Carbon Futures in 2011, to deliver a range of local and national programmes designed to advance the region as a European leader in the production of low carbon vehicles.

== Notable alumni ==
- Chris Basham - footballer with Sheffield United
- Rachel Furness - footballer with Liverpool and Northern Ireland
- Rachael Laws - footballer with Liverpool
- Jill Scott - footballer with Manchester City and England
- Demi Stokes - footballer with Manchester City and England
- Carly Telford - footballer with Chelsea and England

== Specialisms ==
- Creative Industries
- Sport
- Low Carbon and Renewable training

== Performance track ==
Gateshead College and One North East announced (March 2011) the creation of a unique new open-access test track facility – the only one of its kind in Europe. On January the 17th 2012 Transport Minister Norman Baker MP officially opened the Zero Carbon Futures Performance Track and Low Emission Vehicle Development Centre in Washington, Tyne & Wear. The Centre is designed to facilitate the development of the transport of the future providing the ideal location for anyone – academics, automotive manufacturers and system developers - to test and trial new transport technologies.

The test track and workshop building at Nissan Sunderland Plant has been signed over to Gateshead College on a 20-year lease allowing these facilities to be hired by companies, academic institutes and researchers.

The Test Track and vehicle development centre are available for hire to any interested bodies, ranging from universities to major OEMs and vehicle systems developers.

Designed specifically for low carbon vehicles, the Performance Track offers a comprehensive range of charging and refuelling systems, including hydrolysers, a photovoltaic canopy, EV charging points (both standard and fast charge) and biofuel tanks.

The 50sq m workshops include five bays available on flexible terms from day hire to a year lease. The infrastructure includes high-speed internet, a fast-charge bay for EVs, three-phase electricity supply, exhaust extraction systems and a range of vehicle lifts.

The 2.8 km long Performance Track incorporates the following facilities designed for on and off-road vehicle testing:

- 2x 1 km straights suitable for acceleration and lane change testing
- Handling pad with various diameter markings
- Brake test and manoeuvring area
- Test Hill
- Heliport

Road Surfaces:

- Rumble strips
- American Hop Road
- Concrete strip with metal strips
- Cobbled surface
- Road noise surface
- Road road durability
- Gravel road
- Wave road
- Rough splash road
- Pot hole tests

There is also a range of electric vehicle charging technologies including a quick charger, a solar powered charging canopy and a standard charging post – all of which are among the 1,000 charge points being installed across the region.

The centre will be run by Gateshead College.

== Zero Carbon Futures ==
Gateshead College established Zero Carbon Futures in 2011, to deliver a range of local and national programmes designed to advance the region as a European leader in the production of low carbon vehicles. The company opened for business on December 1 and is based in the College's new £10m Skills Academy for Sustainable Manufacturing and Innovation (SASMI), in Washington, adjacent to the Performance Track.

The remit of Zero Carbon Futures includes:

- Development and implementation of Gateshead College's international low carbon vehicle strategy
- Delivery of regional and national programmes to create jobs and apprenticeships
- Consultancy on low carbon vehicle issues
- Advisory and consultancy body for sustainable manufacturing techniques

== UK Electric Vehicle Apprenticeships ==
Gateshead College and Smith Electric Vehicles joined together in 2010 to deliver the UK's first apprenticeship in electric vehicles.

The three-year course will see young people gain workplace skills at Smith Electric Vehicles, and complete training at Gateshead College specialist Skills Academy for Automotive, Engineering, Manufacturing and Logistics.
