= Shanade Hopcroft =

Footballer (born 1997)

- Hopcroft for Crystal Palace in 2024

Personal information
- Full name: Shanade Shereen Hopcroft
- Date of birth: 4 October 1997 (age 29)
- Place of birth: Aylesbury, England
- Height: 5 ft 3 in (1.60 m)
- Position: Midfielder

Team information
- Current team: Crystal Palace
- Number: 24

Youth career
- 2007–2011: Chelsea
- London Bees
- Reading
- Middlesex

College career
Years	Team	Apps	(Gls)
2017–2018	Daytona State College	28	(8)
2019–2021	Colorado Buffaloes	36	(9)

Senior career*
Years	Team	Apps	(Gls)
2022–2023	London City Lionesses	32	(4)
2023–2026	Crystal Palace	31	(7)
2026	Birmingham City	9	(0)
2026–	Crystal Palace	4	(0)

International career^{‡}
2026–	Republic of Ireland	2	(1)
- * Club domestic league appearances and goals as of 13:57, 29 September 2026 (UTC) ‡ National team caps and goals as of 16:11, 18 October 2026 (UTC)

Shanade Shereen Hopcroft (born 4 October 1997) is a professional footballer who plays as a midfielder for Women's Super League club Crystal Palace. Born in England, she currently represents the Republic of Ireland national team. Hopcroft has previously played for London City Lionesses and Birmingham City, and played college soccer for Daytona State College and the Colorado Buffaloes.

== Early life ==
Shanade Shereen Hopcroft was born on 4 October 1997 in Aylesbury, Buckinghamshire. Hopcroft attended Aylesbury Vale Academy.

== Youth career ==
At the age of five or six, Hopcroft played for a local football team called Samba. She joined the Chelsea academy at U10 level, after fellow Aylesbury-born footballer (and then-Chelsea striker) Ellen White's father put her forward for trials. Hopcroft departed Chelsea when she was 14. She would also go on to play for London Bees, Reading and Middlesex at U17 level.

== College career ==
In 2017, Hopcroft moved to the United States where she played college soccer for Daytona State College and the Colorado Buffaloes. During her college soccer career, Hopcroft suffered a ruptured anterior cruciate ligament (ACL), and underwent surgery for the injury.

== Club career ==
=== London City Lionesses, 2022–23 ===
On 31 January 2022, Hopcroft signed for Women's Championship club London City Lionesses.

=== Crystal Palace, 2023–26 ===
On 31 July 2023, Hopcrost signed for fellow Championship side Crystal Palace. In her first season with the club, Palace won the Women's Championship, gaining promotion to the WSL for the first time in the club's history. Hopcroft was voted the club's Player of the Year by her teammates.

Hopcroft missed most of the 2024–25 season with an injury, playing just three times in the WSL before Palace were relegated.

Hopcroft made 11 appearances in the first half of the 2025–26 season.

=== Birmingham City, 2026 ===
On 9 January 2026, Hopcroft signed for WSL2 side Birmingham City. On 18 January 2026, she scored her first goal for the club in a 6–2 FA Cup win over Hull City. Birmingham City won the WSL2 and were promoted to the WSL.

=== Return to Crystal Palace, 2026– ===
On 3 September 2026, Hopcroft returned to Crystal Palace on a two-year deal. Palace, alongside former club Birmingham, had been promoted to the WSL for the 2026–27 season.

== International career ==
Born in England, she is eligible to represent the Republic of Ireland through her grandmother, who was born in Tubbercurry, County Sligo. Hopcroft attended English trial camps at U12 and U15 level.

On 29 September 2026, Hopcroft was called up to the Republic of Ireland national team for the first time for their World Cup play-offs against Kazakhstan. On 9 October, she made her internaitonal debut where she scored in an 8–0 win in Astana.

=== International Appearances ===
As of 13 October 2026

International Appearances and Goals by year
National Team	Year	Apps	Goals
Republic of Ireland	2026	2	1
Total		2	1

=== International Goals ===
International Goals scored by Shanade Hopcroft
No.	Date	Venue	Opponent	Score	Result	Competition
1	9 October 2026	Astana Arena	Kazakhstan	7–0	8–0	2027 World Cup qualification UEFA play-offs

== Personal life ==
In June 2026, Hopcroft married fellow professional footballer and New Zealand international, Grace Neville.

Hopcroft has described Ronaldinho as her childhood football idol.

== Career statistics ==
=== Club ===
As of match played 27 September 2026

Appearances and goals by club, season and competition
Club	Season	League			National cup (Note: Includes Women's FA Cup)		League cup (Note: Includes WSL Players Cup)		Total	
Club	Season	Division	Apps	Goals	Apps	Goals	Apps	Goals	Apps	Goals
London City Lionesses	2021–22	Women's Championship	10	0	—		—		10	0
London City Lionesses	2022–23	Women's Championship	22	4	1	0	3	0	26	4
London City Lionesses	Total		32	4	1	0	3	0	36	4
Crystal Palace	2023–24	Women's Championship	21	6	2	0	3	0	26	6
Crystal Palace	2024–25	WSL	3	0	0	0	0	0	3	0
Crystal Palace	2025–26	WSL 2	7	1	0	0	4	0	11	1
Crystal Palace	Total		31	7	2	0	7	0	40	7
Birmingham City	2025–26	WSL 2	9	0	3	1	0	0	12	1
Crystal Palace	2026–27	WSL	4	0	0	0	0	0	4	0
Career total			76	11	6	1	10	0	92	12

== Honours ==
Crystal Palace

- Women's Championship: 2023–24

Birmingham City

- Women's Super League 2: 2025–26
