= Kristine Bjørdal Leine =

Norwegian footballer (born 1996)

Personal information
- Full name: Kristine Bjørdal Leine
- Date of birth: 6 August 1996 (age 30)
- Place of birth: Norway
- Position: Centre back

Team information
- Current team: Rosenborg
- Number: 2

Youth career
- Fortuna Ålesund

Senior career*
Years	Team	Apps	(Gls)
2011–2015	Fortuna Ålesund		
2015–2019	Røa	84	(2)
2019–2021	Reading	29	(1)
2021–	Rosenborg	29	(0)

International career^{‡}
2012	Norway U16	2	(0)
2013	Norway U17	1	(0)
2014–2015	Norway U19	11	(0)
2016–2020	Norway U23	13	(2)
2017–	Norway	12	(0)
- * Club domestic league appearances and goals as of 8 October 2022 ‡ National team caps and goals as of 8 October 2022

Kristine Bjørdal Leine (born 6 August 1996) is a Norwegian professional footballer who plays as a centre back for Rosenborg and the Norway national team.

== Career ==
=== Club ===
On 20 July 2019, Reading announced the signing of Leine.

In October 2011, at the age of 15, she played her first game for Norwegian club Fortuna Ålesund, for whom she played in second division ( 1. Divisjon ) and Norwegian Championship games until the 2014/15 season. She then moved to first division club Røa IL. During her time there, she made her debut for the national team on November 28, 2017, in the game against Canada.

In addition to her work as a soccer player, she began training as a nurse. The fact that she initially did not get any time off from her school in 2018 to go to the national team's World Cup qualifiers caused a stir in the media. Her teammates Maren Mjelde and Maria Thorisdottir then criticized the fact that many female soccer players find it difficult to combine their education and sport. She finally dropped out of her training later due to the incompatibility with her sporting career.

Finally, in May 2019, she was not called up to the national team squad for the World Cup in France. This was seen as a surprising decision by coach Martin Sjögren. In June 2019 it was announced that she was leaving Røa IL for English Premier League club Reading. There she played eleven games in the season that was prematurely canceled due to the COVID-19 pandemic. After two seasons with the English club, it was announced in May 2021 that she would join Rosenborg BK Kvinner.

In 2021/22 UEFA Women's Champions League qualifying, she lost with Rosenborg to Levante UD in the first-round final, which they lost 4–3 after extra time, meaning they missed the inaugural group stage. They also lost to a Spanish representative, this time Real Madrid, in qualifying for the 2022/23 UEFA Women's Champions League group stage.

== Career statistics ==
=== Club ===
As of 19 May 2021.

Club	Season	League			League Cup		Total	
Club	Season	Division	Apps	Goals	Apps	Goals	Apps	Goals
Røa	2015	Toppserien	11	0	0	0	11	0
Røa	2016	Toppserien	20	1	0	0	20	1
Røa	2017	Toppserien	22	1	0	0	22	1
Røa	2018	Toppserien	22	0	0	0	22	0
Røa	2019	Toppserien	9	0	0	0	9	0
Total			84	2	0	0	84	2
Reading	2019-20	FA WSL	11	1	5	1	16	2
Reading	2020-21	FA WSL	18	0	3	0	21	0
Reading	Total		29	1	8	1	37	2
Career total			113	3	8	1	121	4

=== International ===
As of 16 July 2021.

National team	Year	Apps	Goals
Norway	2017	1	0
Norway	2018	5	0
Norway	2019	4	0
2021	1	0	

== Honours ==
=== International ===
Algarve Cup: 2019
