= Molly Bartrip =

English footballer (born 1996)

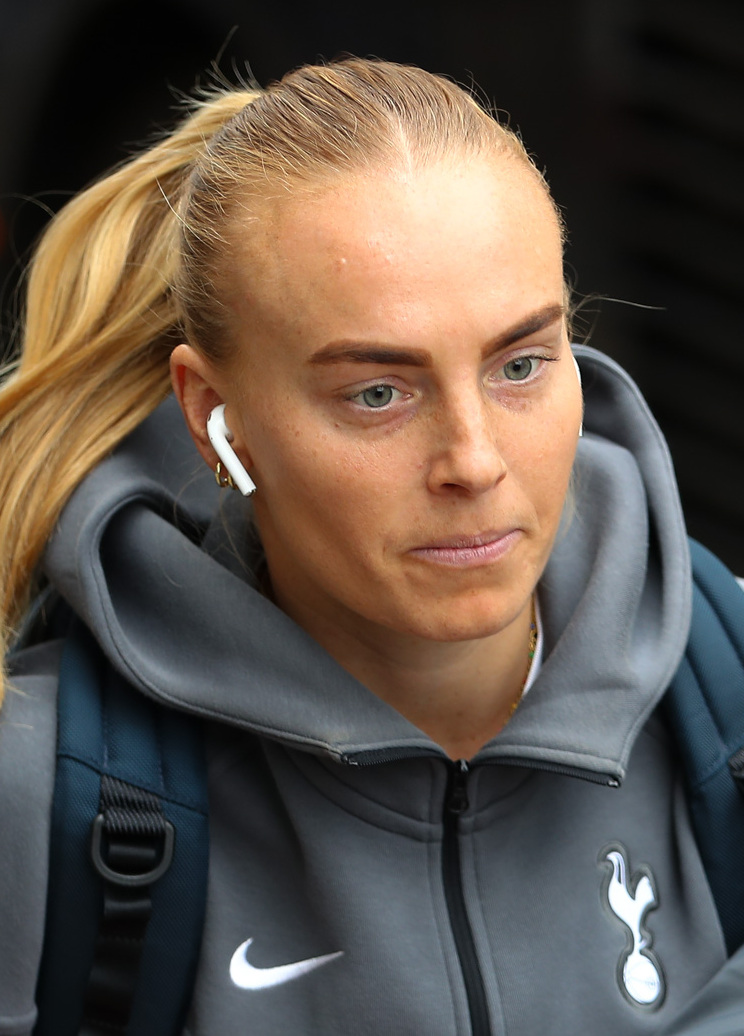
- Bartrip in 2024

Personal information
- Full name: Molly Bartrip
- Date of birth: 1 June 1996 (age 30)
- Place of birth: Romford, England
- Height: 1.64 m (5 ft 4 1/2 in)
- Position: Centre-back

Team information
- Current team: Crystal Palace

Youth career
- Tottenham Hotspur
- Charlton Athletic
- Arsenal

Senior career*
Years	Team	Apps	(Gls)
2014–2021	Reading	59	(0)
2021–2026	Tottenham Hotspur	90	(1)
2026–	Crystal Palace	0	(0)

International career^{‡}
2011–2012	England U17	9	(0)
2013–2015	England U19	9	(0)
2016	England U20	3	(0)
2018	England U23	1	(0)
- * Club domestic league appearances and goals as of 17:14, 3 August 2026 (UTC) ‡ National team caps and goals as of 10 June 2017

Molly Bartrip (born 1 June 1996) is an English professional footballer who plays as a centre-back for Women's Super League club Crystal Palace.

== Early life ==
Bartrip started her playing career at age seven with Tottenham Hotspur's U10s team, in the mid-2000s. She was initially scouted while playing on a local boys team. At age 11 she went on to play for Charlton Athletic and a few years after that she joined Arsenal.

== Club career ==
=== Reading ===
Bartrip joined Reading on 4 April 2014 from Arsenal's academy, ahead of the club's debut season in the newly created FA Women's Super League 2. She played four matches in the 2014 WSL Cup for Reading but no league appearances. In December 2015 Bartrip signed a professional contract with Reading ahead of the club's debut in the WSL.

Her WSL debut came in the season opener on 23 March 2016 in a start against her former club Arsenal. She scored her first and only goal for the club on 1 November 2017 in a win against Watford in the group stage of the 2017–18 FA WSL Cup. Bartrip made her 100th appearance across all competitions for Reading on 10 February 2021 in a win away to Manchester United. She left the club after the 2020–21 FA WSL season, along with seven other players.

=== Tottenham Hotspur ===
On 16 July 2021, she joined Tottenham Hotspur from Reading for an undisclosed fee, signing a two-year contract. She played her first game for Spurs in a 1–0 league win over Birmingham City. Having played in every game of the 2024–25 season Bartrip signed a new three-year contract, taking the 29-year-old defender until 2028. Spurs had concluded their efforts second from the bottom culminating in the sacking of coach Robert Vilahamn on 8 June 2025 after two seasons in charge.

=== Crystal Palace ===
In August 2026, Bartrip signed a three-year contract with recently-promoted WSL side Crystal Palace for an undisclosed fee.

== Personal life ==
In 2018, Bartrip revealed that she had anorexia nervosa during her teenage years.

== Career statistics ==
=== Club ===
As of match played 16 May 2026

Appearances and goals by club, season and competition
Club	Season	League			FA Cup		League cup (Note: Includes FA Women's League Cup)		Total	
Club	Season	Division	Apps	Goals	Apps	Goals	Apps	Goals	Apps	Goals
Reading	2014	Women's Super League	0	0	?	?	4	0	4	0
Reading	2015	Women's Super League	0	0	2	0	0	0	2	0
Reading	2016	Women's Super League	12	0	1	0	1	0	14	0
Reading	2017	Women's Super League	2	0	—		—		2	0
Reading	2017–18	Women's Super League	6	0	0	0	4	1	10	1
Reading	2018–19	Women's Super League	14	0	4	0	4	0	22	0
Reading	2019–20	Women's Super League	4	0	1	0	1	0	6	0
Reading	2020–21	Women's Super League	21	0	1	0	3	0	25	0
Reading	Total		59	0	9	0	17	1	85	1
Tottenham Hotspur	2021–22	Women's Super League	22	0	1	0	4	0	27	0
Tottenham Hotspur	2022–23	Women's Super League	22	1	2	0	4	0	28	1
Tottenham Hotspur	2023–24	Women's Super League	18	0	2	0	4	0	24	0
Tottenham Hotspur	2024–25	Women's Super League	22	0	1	0	4	0	27	0
Tottenham Hotspur	2025–26	Women's Super League	6	0	1	0	1	0	8	0
Tottenham Hotspur	Total		90	1	7	0	17	0	114	1
Crystal Palace	2026–27	Women's Super League	0	0	0	0	0	0	0	0
Career total			141	1	16	0	34	1	199	2
