= Emily Donovan =

English footballer (born 1997)

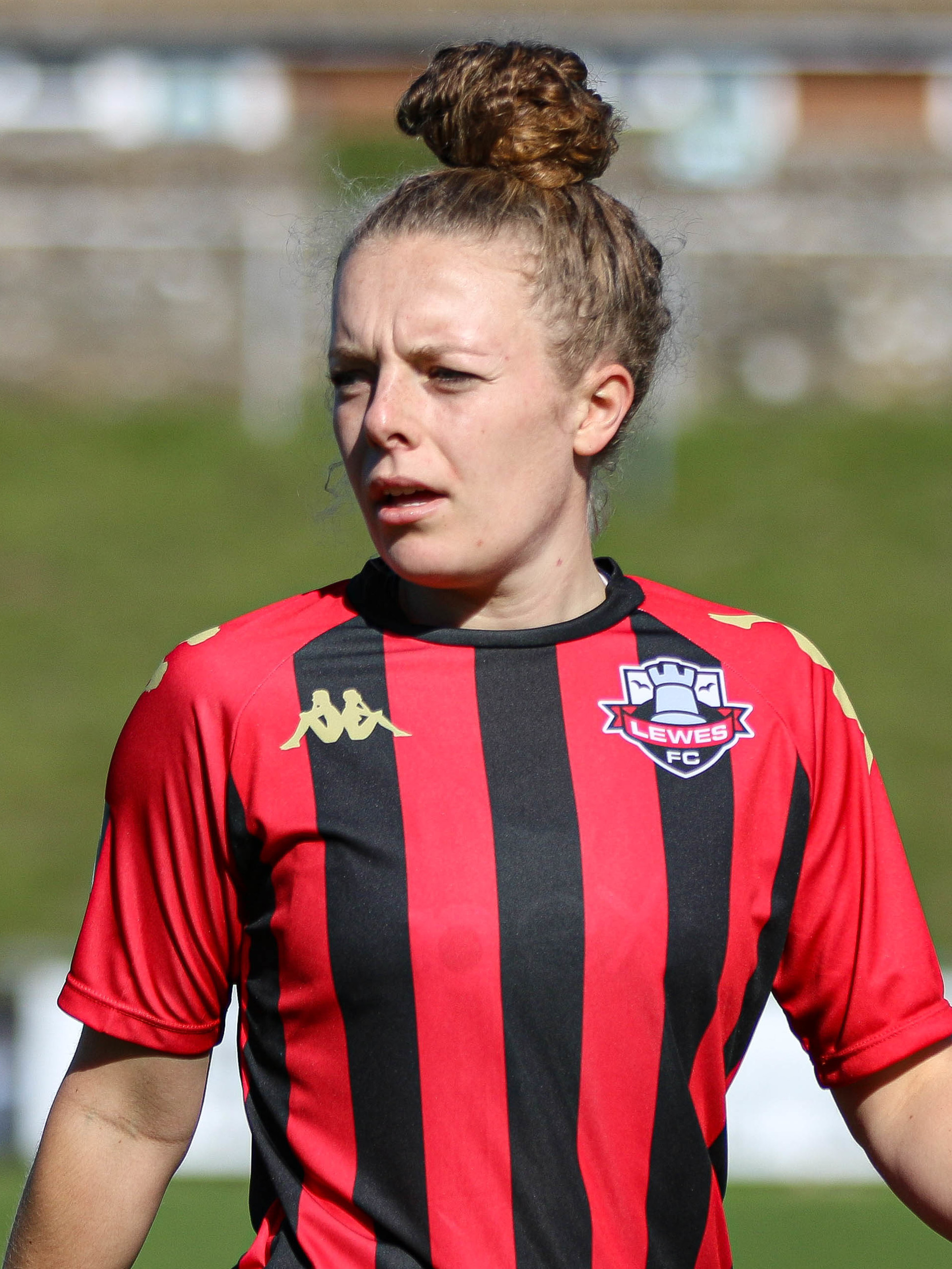
- Donovan with Lewes in 2020

Personal information
- Date of birth: 16 February 1997 (age 29)
- Place of birth: Bridport, Dorset, England
- Position: Midfielder

Team information
- Current team: AFC Wimbledon
- Number: 16

Youth career
- –2015: Yeovil Town

Senior career*
| Years | Team | Apps | (Gls) |
| 2015–2016 | Yeovil Town | | |
| 2017–2018 | Oxford United | 8 | (0) |
| 2018–2019 | Yeovil Town | 18 | (1) |
| 2019–2021 | Lewes | 23 | (1) |
| 2021–2022 | London Bees | 2 | (0) |
| 2022– | Wimbledon | 22 | (6) |
- * Club domestic league appearances and goals as of 03:02, 11 October 2023 (UTC)

Emily Donovan (born 16 February 1997) is an English footballer who plays as a midfielder for Wimbledon in the FA Women's National League.

== Career ==
Having come through the youth team at Yeovil Town, she signed her first contract with the club in 2015. She left at the end of the 2016 season, and signed for Oxford United in February 2017. She returned to Yeovil Town in 2018 before joining Lewes in 2019. On 1 February 2021, she was signed by London Bees.

She joined Wimbledon in 2021. She was recognised as the players player by her team in a season where the team were promoted.
