= Erin Nayler =

New Zealand footballer

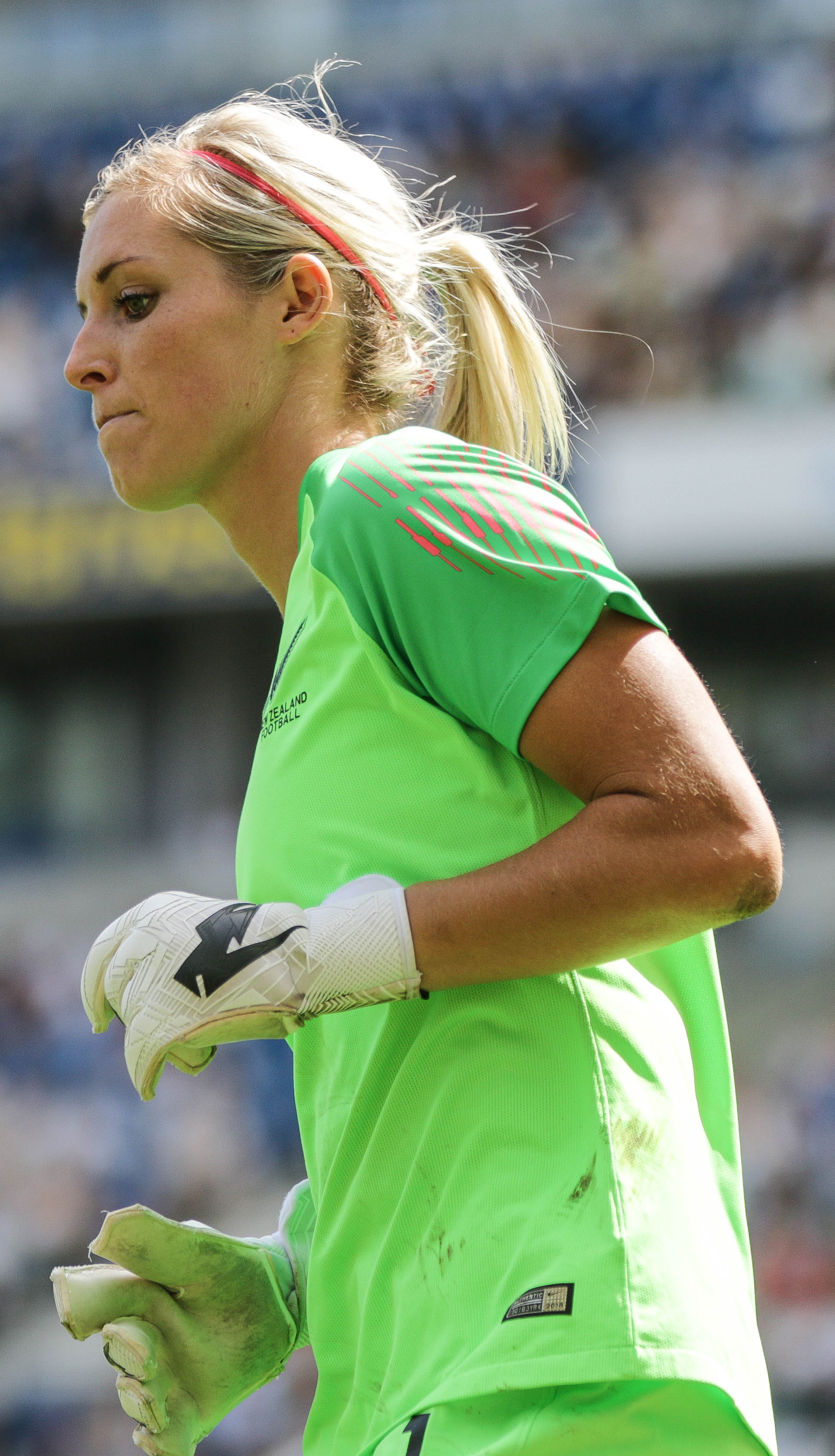
- Nayler playing for New Zealand in 2019

Personal information
- Full name: Erin Nicole Nayler
- Date of birth: 17 April 1992 (age 34)
- Place of birth: Auckland, New Zealand
- Height: 1.76 m (5 ft 9 in)
- Position: Goalkeeper

College career
Years	Team	Apps	(Gls)
2010	IPFW Mastodons		

Senior career*
Years	Team	Apps	(Gls)
- Lynn-Avon United
- Forrest Hill Milford
- Eastern Suburbs AFC
2015	Norwest United AFC		
2016	Sky Blue FC	0	(0)
2016–2017	Lyon	0	(0)
2017	Grenoble Foot 38	11	(0)
2017–2020	Bordeaux	32	(0)
2020–2021	Reading	1	(0)
2022	Umeå IK	22	(0)
2023	Norrköping	0	(0)
2023–2024	Bayern Munich	1	(0)

International career^{‡}
2010–2012	New Zealand U-20	10	(0)
2013–2024	New Zealand	84	(0)
- * Club domestic league appearances and goals as of 17:45, 9 July 2023 (UTC) ‡ National team caps and goals as of 17:45, 9 July 2023

Erin Nicole Nayler (born 17 April 1992) is a New Zealand former professional association football goalkeeper, who last played for Bayern Munich of the German Frauen-Bundesliga. She has represented New Zealand at international level.

== Early life ==
Nayler started playing as a goalkeeper at the age of 10. Playing for Westlake Girls High School with her father Mark as coach, Nayler won many Secondary School tournaments before graduating in 2009. Afterwards she went to Indiana University – Purdue University Fort Wayne in 2010, spending one year playing for the IPFW Mastodons and studying biology. She is got a degree in Molecular Biology at Massey University.

== Career ==
Nayler was a member of the New Zealand U-20 side at the 2010 and 2012 Women's World Championships, playing in all three of New Zealand's group games at both events. The performances earned her a spot at the senior New Zealand team, the "Football Ferns", for the 2011 FIFA Women's World Cup. Nayler was the only uncapped member of New Zealand's squad and did not feature in the tournament. She was also a standby player for the 2012 Olympics.

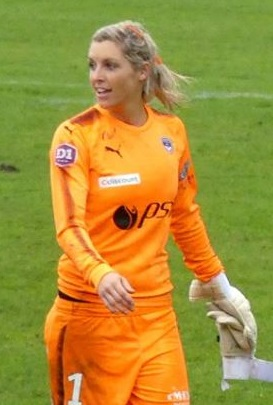
With Bordeaux in 2018.

Nayler's eventual senior début happened at the 2013 Cyprus Cup, in a 2–0 win over Italy.

She played all three matches of New Zealand at the 2015 FIFA Women's World Cup in Canada. Nayler was chosen as Player of the Match during her second game, as she kept a clean sheet in a 0–0 tie with the hosts in Edmonton.

In 2015, Nayler was captain of Northern Football as they won the National Women's League, the top-flight women's football tournament of New Zealand. She also played for Norwest United of the Northern League. In 2016, Northern Football manager Paul Greig had become assistant coach of Sky Blue FC, in the United States' National Women's Soccer League, and led his new team to sign Nayler. However, she was released by Sky Blue after 26 days and no games played, and Sky Blue signed another outfielder instead.

Nayler then hoped to use the 2016 Olympics, where she was again the Ferns' starting goalie, to see if she attracted the attention of any foreign clubs. In the Olympics, Nayler had a clean sheet in New Zealand's second game, a defeat of Colombia by 1–0, but the Ferns fell in the group stage following defeats to the United States and France.

Shortly after the Games, Nayler signed a two-year contract with Olympique Lyonnais of France. In 2017 she was loaned to women's team of Grenoble Foot 38, who played the Division 2, after seeing no playing time as the third goalkeeper. For the 2017–18 season, Nayler signed with the female squad of FC Girondins de Bordeaux, who played in the Division 1. At the end of her first season, where Bordeaux finished seventh, Nayler renewed her contract for an additional two years.

In April 2019, Nayler was named to the final 23-player squad for the 2019 FIFA Women's World Cup.

In August 2020, Nayler announced she had signed for FA Women's Super League club Reading. Unable to dislodge the incumbent goalkeeper Grace Moloney and unhappy at a lack of playing opportunities, Nayler left after one season.

On 27 October 2021, Damallsvenskan club Umeå IK announced the signing of Nayler ahead of their 2022 season, where she played during 2022.

On 1 December 2022, Damallsvenskan club IFK Norrköping announced the signing of Nayler ahead of their 2023 season.

Bayern Munich announced in August 2023 that Nayler had signed a one-year contract with the club. Nayler played as a substitute in the last home match of 2023–24 Frauen-Bundesliga season against 1. FC Nürnberg.

== Honours ==
Bayern Munich

- Frauen-Bundesliga: 2023–24

Individual

- IFFHS OFC Woman Team of the Decade 2011–2020
