= List of English women's football transfers summer 2022 =

The 2022 English women's football summer transfer window ran from 10 June to 31 August 2022. Players without a club could be signed at any time, clubs could sign players on loan dependent on their league's regulations, and clubs could sign a goalkeeper on an emergency loan if they had no registered senior goalkeeper available. This list includes transfers featuring at least one club from either the Women's Super League or the Women's Championship that were completed after the end of the winter 2021–22 transfer window on 2 February and before the end of the 2022 summer window.

== Transfers ==
All players and clubs without a flag are English.

Date	Name	Moving from	Moving to	Ref.
25 January 2022	(Scotland) Leila Lister	Reading	(United States) Colorado Buffaloes	
7 February 2022	(Wales) Poppy Soper	Plymouth Argyle	Chelsea (dual registration)	
17 February 2022	(Germany) Marisa Ewers	Aston Villa	Retired	
2 March 2022	(Republic of Ireland) Saoirse Noonan	Durham	(Republic of Ireland) Shelbourne (loan)	
3 March 2022	(New Zealand) CJ Bott	(Norway) Vålerenga	Leicester City	
3 March 2022	(Wales) Esther Morgan	Leicester City	Tottenham Hotspur (end of loan)	
17 March 2022	(Republic of Ireland) Jessica Ziu	(Republic of Ireland) Shelbourne	West Ham United	
31 March 2022	(France) Valérie Gauvin	Everton	(United States) North Carolina Courage	
31 March 2022	(Northern Ireland) Rebecca Holloway	Birmingham City	(United States) Racing Louisville	
1 April 2022	(Canada) Janine Beckie	Manchester City	(United States) Portland Thorns	
5 April 2022	(Sweden) Jonna Andersson	Chelsea	(Sweden) Hammarby	
19 April 2022	Anna Patten	Aston Villa	Arsenal (end of loan)	
23 April 2022	Flo Allen	Bristol City	Retired	
26 April 2022	Anita Asante	Aston Villa	Retired	
28 April 2022	(United States) Tobin Heath	Arsenal	(United States) OL Reign	
28 April 2022	Brooke Chaplen	Reading	Retired	
2 May 2022	Karen Bardsley	Manchester City	Retired	
4 May 2022	Zoe Cross	Lewes	Retired	
7 May 2022	Aimee Hodgson	Blackburn Rovers	(United States) Hofstra Pride	
10 May 2022	(Netherlands) Inessa Kaagman	Brighton & Hove Albion	(Netherlands) PSV	
10 May 2022	(Jamaica) Jade Bailey	Liverpool	Unattached	
10 May 2022	Charlotte Wardlaw	Liverpool	Chelsea (end of loan)	
11 May 2022	(Norway) Karna Solskjær	Manchester United	(Norway) AaFK Fortuna	
11 May 2022	Emily Ramsey	Birmingham City	Manchester United (end of loan)	
11 May 2022	Matilda Taylor	Sheffield United	(United States) Daytona Beach Eagles	
11 May 2022	Sam Sharrocks	Sheffield United	(United States) Rider Broncs	
12 May 2022	(Netherlands) Danique Kerkdijk	Brighton & Hove Albion	(Netherlands) Twente	
12 May 2022	Danielle Bowman	Brighton & Hove Albion	Retired	
12 May 2022	Eve Blakey	Sunderland	(United States) Louisiana–Monroe Warhawks	
16 May 2022	Chelsey Jukes	Blackburn Rovers	Unattached	
16 May 2022	(Jamaica) Satara Murray	Bristol City	(United States) Racing Louisville	
17 May 2022	Georgia Stanway	Manchester City	(Germany) Bayern Munich	
18 May 2022	Jill Scott	Manchester City	Unattached	
19 May 2022	Natalie Haigh	Aston Villa	Retired	
20 May 2022	(Scotland) Lisa Robertson	Birmingham City	(Scotland) Celtic (end of loan)	
20 May 2022	(Republic of Ireland) Marie Hourihan	Birmingham City	Retired	
21 May 2022	Anna Colville	Coventry United	Unattached	
21 May 2022	(Republic of Ireland) Phoebe Warner	Coventry United	Unattached	
21 May 2022	Becky McGrother	Coventry United	Unattached	
23 May 2022	(Scotland) Abbi Grant	(Scotland) Glasgow City	Leicester City (end of loan)	
23 May 2022	(Slovenia) Luana Zajmi	Blackburn Rovers	Leicester City (end of loan)	
23 May 2022	(Slovenia) Luana Zajmi	Leicester City	(Slovenia) Pomurje	
24 May 2022	(Netherlands) Esmee de Graaf	Leicester City	(Netherlands) Feyenoord	
24 May 2022	(South Korea) Ji So-yun	Chelsea	(South Korea) Suwon FC	
24 May 2022	(Jamaica) Vyan Sampson	Charlton Athletic	Unattached	
24 May 2022	Jessica King	Charlton Athletic	Unattached	
24 May 2022	Elisha Sulola	Charlton Athletic	Unattached	
25 May 2022	(France) Karima Benameur Taieb	Manchester City	(France) Marseille	
28 May 2022	(Austria) Viktoria Schnaderbeck	Tottenham Hotspur	Arsenal (end of loan)	
28 May 2022	(China) Tang Jiali	Tottenham Hotspur	(China) Shanghai Shengli (end of loan)	
28 May 2022	Eleanor Heeps	Blackburn Rovers	Tottenham Hotspur (end of loan)	
29 May 2022	(Scotland) Kim Little	Arsenal	(United States) OL Reign (loan)	
1 June 2022	(Austria) Viktoria Schnaderbeck	Arsenal	Unattached	
1 June 2022	Bianca Baptiste	Crystal Palace	Unattached	
1 June 2022	Hannah Churchill	Crystal Palace	Unattached	
1 June 2022	Grace Coombs	Crystal Palace	Unattached	
1 June 2022	Leanne Cowan	Crystal Palace	Unattached	
1 June 2022	Alex Hennessy	Crystal Palace	Arsenal (end of loan)	
1 June 2022	Sophie McLean	Crystal Palace	Unattached	
1 June 2022	Kate Natkiel	Crystal Palace	Unattached	
1 June 2022	Emily Orman	Crystal Palace	Chelsea (end of loan)	
1 June 2022	Gracie Pearse	Crystal Palace	Tottenham Hotspur (end of loan)	
3 June 2022	(Venezuela) Deyna Castellanos	(Spain) Atlético Madrid	Manchester City	
4 June 2022	Ava Kuyken	Bristol City	(Scotland) Hibernian	
7 June 2022	Hannah Short	London City Lionesses	Unattached	
7 June 2022	Lilly Pursey	London City Lionesses	Unattached	
7 June 2022	(Bermuda) Kenni Thompson	London City Lionesses	Unattached	
7 June 2022	Annie Rossiter	London City Lionesses	Unattached	
7 June 2022	(Republic of Ireland) Alli Murphy	London City Lionesses	Unattached	
7 June 2022	Mollie Rouse	London City Lionesses	Unattached	
7 June 2022	Brooke Nunn	London City Lionesses	Unattached	
7 June 2022	Melis Mehmet	London City Lionesses	Unattached	
7 June 2022	(Poland) Wiktoria Fronc	London City Lionesses	Unattached	
8 June 2022	(Spain) Leila Ouahabi	(Spain) Barcelona	Manchester City	
8 June 2022	Daisy Burt	Sunderland	Newcastle United	
8 June 2022	Grace Boyes	Sunderland	Newcastle United	
8 June 2022	(France) Ève Périsset	(France) Bordeaux	Chelsea	
9 June 2022	(Spain) Laia Aleixandri	(Spain) Atlético Madrid	Manchester City	
9 June 2022	Nicki Gears	Durham	Sunderland	
9 June 2022	Abby Holmes	Durham	Sunderland	
10 June 2022	Poppy Lawson	Manchester United	(Scotland) Hibernian	
10 June 2022	(Canada) Kadeisha Buchanan	(France) Lyon	Chelsea	
13 June 2022	Georgia Timms	Lewes	(Scotland) Heart of Midlothian	
16 June 2022	(Mexico) Silvana Flores	Tottenham Hotspur	(Mexico) Monterrey	
16 June 2022	Alisha Ware	Southampton	Unattached	
16 June 2022	(Wales) Caitlin Morris	Southampton	Unattached	
16 June 2022	Kirsty Whitton	Southampton	Unattached	
16 June 2022	Sara Luce	Southampton	Unattached	
16 June 2022	Shannon Sievwright	Southampton	Unattached	
16 June 2022	Shelly Provan	Southampton	Unattached	
17 June 2022	(France) Maéva Clemaron	Tottenham Hotspur	(Switzerland) Servette	
17 June 2022	Halle Houssein	West Ham United	Arsenal (end of loan)	
17 June 2022	Halle Houssein	Arsenal	West Ham United	
17 June 2022	(Scotland) Lisa Evans	West Ham United	Arsenal (end of loan)	
17 June 2022	(Scotland) Lisa Evans	Arsenal	West Ham United	
19 June 2022	Lucy Bronze	Manchester City	(Spain) Barcelona	
20 June 2022	Lucy Ashworth-Clifford	Lewes	(Scotland) Celtic	
20 June 2022	(Jamaica) Drew Spence	Chelsea	Tottenham Hotspur	
20 June 2022	(Scotland) Abbi Grant	Leicester City	(Scotland) Glasgow City	
27 June 2022	Tyler Dodds	(Scotland) Glasgow City	Sunderland	
29 June 2022	(New Zealand) Katie Rood	Southampton	(Scotland) Heart of Midlothian	
29 June 2022	(Australia) Mary Fowler	(France) Montpellier	Manchester City	
29 June 2022	(United States) Zaneta Wyne	West Ham United	(United States) Racing Louisville	
30 June 2022	Jess Reavill	Sheffield United	Unattached	
30 June 2022	Ocean Rolandsen	Sheffield United	(Scotland) Heart of Midlothian	
30 June 2022	Lucy Whipp	Birmingham City	Unattached	
30 June 2022	(Denmark) Cecilie Sandvej	Birmingham City	Unattached	
1 July 2022	Siobhan Wilson	Crystal Palace	Birmingham City	
1 July 2022	Fran Bentley	Manchester United	Bristol City	
1 July 2022	(Denmark) Signe Bruun	Manchester United	(France) Lyon (end of loan)	
1 July 2022	(Wales) Maria Francis-Jones	Manchester City	Sheffield United (dual registration)	
2 July 2022	Emma Lawton	Manchester City	(Scotland) Motherwell	
2 July 2022	Sandy MacIver	Everton	Manchester City	
3 July 2022	Sophie Quirk	Charlton Athletic	Portsmouth	
4 July 2022	(New Zealand) Meikayla Moore	Liverpool	(Scotland) Glasgow City	
4 July 2022	(Canada) Adriana Leon	West Ham United	Manchester United	
4 July 2022	(Iceland) Cecilía Rán Rúnarsdóttir	(Germany) Bayern Munich	Everton (end of loan)	
4 July 2022	(Iceland) Cecilía Rán Rúnarsdóttir	Everton	(Germany) Bayern Munich	
4 July 2022	Lois Joel	West Ham United	London City Lionesses	
4 July 2022	Tatiana Saunders	Lewes	Durham	
4 July 2022	Georgia Robert	Sheffield United	Durham	
4 July 2022	(Scotland) Kathryn Hill	Durham	(Scotland) Rangers	
5 July 2022	Millie Farrow	Crystal Palace	London City Lionesses	
5 July 2022	(Czech Republic) Kateřina Svitková	West Ham United	Chelsea	
5 July 2022	(Scotland) Rachel Brown	Nottingham Forest	Sheffield United	
6 July 2022	(Northern Ireland) Simone Magill	Everton	Aston Villa	
6 July 2022	(Finland) Emma Koivisto	Brighton & Hove Albion	Liverpool	
6 July 2022	Ellie Brazil	Brighton & Hove Albion	Tottenham Hotspur	
6 July 2022	(Scotland) Lois Heuchan	Charlton Athletic	London City Lionesses	
6 July 2022	Jessica Clarke	Sheffield United	Durham	
6 July 2022	Paige Peake	Ipswich Town	Southampton	
7 July 2022	Anna Patten	Arsenal	Aston Villa (loan)	
7 July 2022	(Scotland) Caroline Weir	Manchester City	(Spain) Real Madrid	
7 July 2022	(Brazil) Ivana Fuso	Manchester United	(Germany) Bayer Leverkusen (loan)	
7 July 2022	Angela Addison	Tottenham Hotspur	Charlton Athletic	
7 July 2022	Jodie Hutton	Aston Villa	Bristol City	
7 July 2022	(Wales) Olivia Clark	Coventry United	Bristol City	
7 July 2022	(Scotland) Claire Emslie	Everton	(United States) Angel City	
7 July 2022	(Wales) Josie Green	Tottenham Hotspur	Leicester City	
7 July 2022	Lucy Shepherd	(United States) Washington Spirit	London City Lionesses	
7 July 2022	Beth Lumsden	Oxford United	Southampton	
8 July 2022	Aileen Whelan	Brighton & Hove Albion	Leicester City	
8 July 2022	(Republic of Ireland) Chloe Mustaki	(Republic of Ireland) Shelbourne	Bristol City	
8 July 2022	Sophie Harris	Leicester City	Southampton	
8 July 2022	Sophie Barker	Leicester City	Sheffield United (loan)	
8 July 2022	Hermione Cull	Arsenal	London City Lionesses	
8 July 2022	Freda Ayisi	Lewes	Charlton Athletic	
9 July 2022	Sophie Haywood	Aston Villa	Sheffield United	
9 July 2022	(Scotland) Sarah Ewens	Birmingham City	London City Lionesses	
11 July 2022	Danielle Turner	Everton	Aston Villa	
11 July 2022	(United States) Erin Simon	(United States) Racing Louisville	Leicester City	
11 July 2022	Gilly Flaherty	West Ham United	Liverpool	
12 July 2022	(Wales) Natasha Harding	Reading	Aston Villa	
12 July 2022	Rachel Williams	Tottenham Hotspur	Manchester United	
12 July 2022	(Jamaica) Shania Hayles	Aston Villa	Bristol City	
13 July 2022	(New Zealand) Anna Leat	West Ham United	Aston Villa	
13 July 2022	(Germany) Ramona Petzelberger	Aston Villa	Tottenham Hotspur	
13 July 2022	Sian Rogers	Aston Villa	Charlton Athletic (loan)	
13 July 2022	Poppy Pattinson	Everton	Brighton & Hove Albion	
14 July 2022	(Denmark) Simone Boye Sørensen	Arsenal	(Sweden) Hammarby	
14 July 2022	Martha Harris	Manchester United	Birmingham City	
14 July 2022	(Scotland) Eartha Cumings	Charlton Athletic	Liverpool	
14 July 2022	(Wales) Megan Wynne	Charlton Athletic	Southampton	
14 July 2022	Corinne Henson	Watford	Charlton Athletic	
15 July 2022	(Greece) Veatriki Sarri	Birmingham City	Brighton & Hove Albion	
15 July 2022	Emily Simpkins	Brighton & Hove Albion	Charlton Athletic	
15 July 2022	(Republic of Ireland) Izzy Atkinson	Unattached	West Ham United	
15 July 2022	Jess Park	Manchester City	Everton (loan)	
15 July 2022	(Scotland) Kirsty Smith	Manchester United	West Ham United	
15 July 2022	Grace Clinton	Everton	Manchester United	
15 July 2022	Mollie Green	Coventry United	Birmingham City	
15 July 2022	Lucy Thomas	Coventry United	Birmingham City	
15 July 2022	Bethan Davies	Huddersfield Town	Sheffield United	
16 July 2022	(Netherlands) Shanice van de Sanden	(Germany) VfL Wolfsburg (women)	Liverpool	
16 July 2022	Chloe Dixon	Blackburn Rovers	Unattached	
16 July 2022	Katie Anderson	Blackburn Rovers	Unattached	
16 July 2022	(United States) Erica Cunningham	Blackburn Rovers	Unattached	
16 July 2022	(Spain) Amaya Coleman-Evans	Blackburn Rovers	Unattached	
16 July 2022	Naomi Hartley	Coventry United	Sheffield United	
16 July 2022	Grace Riglar	Coventry United	Sheffield United	
16 July 2022	Izzy Collins	Lewes	Portsmouth	
18 July 2022	(Netherlands) Katja Snoeijs	(France) Bordeaux	Everton	
18 July 2022	Sophie Hillyerd	Charlton Athletic	West Ham United	
19 July 2022	(Republic of Ireland) Saoirse Noonan	(Republic of Ireland) Shelbourne	Durham (end of loan)	
19 July 2022	(Republic of Ireland) Emily Kraft	(Germany) Eintracht Frankfurt	Lewes	
19 July 2022	Lucy Watson	Sheffield United	Chelsea	
19 July 2022	Sophie O'Rourke	Lewes	Charlton Athletic	
20 July 2022	Alex Hennessy	Arsenal	West Ham United	
20 July 2022	Maya Le Tissier	Brighton & Hove Albion	Manchester United	
20 July 2022	(New Zealand) Rebekah Stott	(Australia) Melbourne City	Brighton & Hove Albion	
20 July 2022	(Sweden) Anna Anvegård	Everton	(Sweden) BK Häcken	
20 July 2022	(Wales) Gwen Davies	Bristol City	Unattached	
21 July 2022	(Wales) Carrie Jones	Manchester United	Leicester City (loan)	
21 July 2022	(Australia) Lydia Williams	Arsenal	(France) Paris Saint-Germain	
21 July 2022	(United States) Brooke Hendrix	(Australia) Melbourne Victory	Reading	
21 July 2022	Heidi Logan	Lewes	Charlton Athletic	
21 July 2022	Sophie Whitehouse	Bristol City	Lewes	
21 July 2022	Lexi Lloyd-Smith	Charlton Athletic	Southampton	
22 July 2022	Keira Flannery	Arsenal	West Ham United	
22 July 2022	Tara Bourne	Manchester United	Birmingham City (loan)	
22 July 2022	(Wales) Tegan McGowan	Chelsea Youth	Charlton Athletic	
22 July 2022	Katie Wilkinson	Coventry United	Southampton	
25 July 2022	(United States) Kaylan Marckese	(Denmark) Køge	Arsenal	
25 July 2022	(Spain) Lucía García	(Spain) Athletic Bilbao	Manchester United	
25 July 2022	Charlotte Clarke	Liverpool	West Bromwich Albion (loan)	
26 July 2022	(Republic of Ireland) Emily Whelan	Birmingham City	(Scotland) Glasgow City	
26 July 2022	(Netherlands) Kerstin Casparij	(Netherlands) Twente	Manchester City	
27 July 2022	Fran Stenson	Arsenal	Birmingham City (loan)	
27 July 2022	Amy Turner	(United States) Orlando Pride	Tottenham Hotspur	
27 July 2022	Emma Thompson	Chelsea	Lewes (loan)	
28 July 2022	Ashley Hodson	Liverpool	Birmingham City (loan)	
28 July 2022	Izzy Cook	Bristol City	Cheltenham Town	
29 July 2022	Charlie Devlin	Leicester City	Birmingham City (loan)	
29 July 2022	(United States) Vicky Bruce	Unattached	Bristol City	
29 July 2022	Elysia Boddy	Leicester City	Bristol City	
29 July 2022	(Poland) Nikola Karczewska	(France) Fleury 91	Tottenham Hotspur	
29 July 2022	Evie Smith	Liverpool	Blackburn Rovers	
29 July 2022	(Scotland) Cara Milne-Redhead	(United States) Seton Hall Pirates	Coventry United	
29 July 2022	Amber-Keegan Stobbs	Watford	Lewes	
29 July 2022	(New Zealand) Ashleigh Ward	Actonians	Southampton	
30 July 2022	(Wales) Angharad James	(United States) Orlando Pride	Tottenham Hotspur	
1 August 2022	(Norway) Elisabeth Terland	(Norway) Brann	Brighton & Hove Albion	
1 August 2022	(South Korea) Park Ye-eun	(South Korea) Gyeongju KHNP	Brighton & Hove Albion	
1 August 2022	Lucy Parry	Liverpool	(Scotland) Hibernian (loan)	
2 August 2022	(France) Viviane Asseyi	(Germany) Bayern Munich	West Ham United	
3 August 2022	(Norway) Thea Kyvåg	(Norway) LSK Kvinner	West Ham United	
3 August 2022	Becky Jane	Charlton Athletic	Reading	
3 August 2022	(Australia) Tameka Yallop	West Ham United	(Norway) Brann	
3 August 2022	Olivia Fergusson	Coventry United	(Scotland) Celtic	
4 August 2022	Fran Kitching	Sheffield United	Crystal Palace	
4 August 2022	Felicity Gibbons	Brighton & Hove Albion	Crystal Palace	
4 August 2022	(Scotland) Chloe Arthur	Aston Villa	Crystal Palace	
4 August 2022	(Wales) Anna Filbey	Charlton Athletic	Crystal Palace	
4 August 2022	Chloe Peplow	Reading	Crystal Palace (loan)	
4 August 2022	Rianna Dean	Liverpool	Crystal Palace	
4 August 2022	Annabel Blanchard	Blackburn Rovers	Crystal Palace	
4 August 2022	(Scotland) Kirsten Reilly	(Scotland) Rangers	Crystal Palace	
4 August 2022	Natalia Negri	Charlton Athletic	Crystal Palace	
4 August 2022	(Jamaica) Paige Bailey-Gayle	Leicester City	Crystal Palace	
4 August 2022	Hollie Olding	Charlton Athletic	Crystal Palace	
4 August 2022	Ellie Noble	Lewes	Crystal Palace	
4 August 2022	(Wales) Elise Hughes	Charlton Athletic	Crystal Palace	
4 August 2022	(Australia) Polly Doran	(Australia) Melbourne Victory	Crystal Palace (loan)	
4 August 2022	Shauna Guyatt	Chelsea Academy	Crystal Palace	
4 August 2022	(Northern Ireland) Natalie Johnson	Coventry United	Lewes	
4 August 2022	(Wales) Poppy Soper	Chelsea	Charlton Athletic	
4 August 2022	Maisy Collis	Bristol City	Cheltenham Town	
5 August 2022	Charlie Wellings	(Scotland) Celtic	Reading	
5 August 2022	(Northern Ireland) Jackie Burns	(Sweden) Häcken	Reading	
5 August 2022	(Northern Ireland) Lauren Wade	(Northern Ireland) Glentoran	Reading	
5 August 2022	(France) Kenza Dali	Everton	Aston Villa	
5 August 2022	Emily Ramsey	Manchester United	Everton (loan)	
5 August 2022	(Denmark) Karen Holmgaard	(Germany) Turbine Potsdam	Everton	
5 August 2022	(Denmark) Sara Holmgaard	(Germany) Turbine Potsdam	Everton	
5 August 2022	(Denmark) Sara Holmgaard	Everton	(Denmark) Fortuna Hjørring (loan)	
5 August 2022	Emily Syme	Unattached	Bristol City	
5 August 2022	(South Africa) Faith Nokuthula	Brighton & Hove Albion	Blackburn Rovers	
5 August 2022	Chloe Morgan	Crystal Palace	Retired	
5 August 2022	(Sweden) Johanna Rytting Kaneryd	(Sweden) BK Häcken	Chelsea	
5 August 2022	Danielle Brown	Durham	Sunderland	
5 August 2022	Katie Robinson	Charlton Athletic	Brighton & Hove Albion (end of loan)	
6 August 2022	Maria Edwards	Manchester United	(Germany) SGS Essen	
6 August 2022	Nikita Parris	Arsenal	Manchester United	
6 August 2022	Melissa Johnson	Bristol City	Charlton Athletic	
8 August 2022	(Malta) Maria Farrugia	Sunderland	Durham	
9 August 2022	Rachel Daly	(United States) Houston Dash	Aston Villa	
9 August 2022	(Denmark) Katrine Veje	(Sweden) FC Rosengård	Everton	
9 August 2022	(Belgium) Léa Cordier	Lewes	(Belgium) Standard Liège	
10 August 2022	(France) Aïssatou Tounkara	(Spain) Atlético Madrid	Manchester United	
10 August 2022	(Norway) Celin Bizet Ildhusøy	(France) Paris Saint-Germain	Tottenham Hotspur	
11 August 2022	(Republic of Ireland) Diane Caldwell	Manchester United	Reading	
12 August 2022	Lucy Watson	Chelsea	Charlton Athletic (loan)	
12 August 2022	Elisha N'Dow	Aston Villa	Charlton Athletic (loan)	
12 August 2022	Sophie Bradley-Auckland	Sheffield United	Retired	
12 August 2022	(Scotland) Brianna Westrup	(Scotland) Rangers	Sunderland	
14 August 2022	(Scotland) Niamh Murphy	Manchester United	Blackburn Rovers (dual registration)	
14 August 2022	(Wales) Chloe Williams	Manchester United	Blackburn Rovers (dual registration)	
14 August 2022	Destiney Toussaint	Coventry United	Wolverhampton Wanderers	
15 August 2022	(Scotland) Kim Little	(United States) OL Reign	Arsenal (end of loan)	
16 August 2022	(Australia) Libby Copus-Brown	(Australia) Western Sydney Wanderers	Lewes	
18 August 2022	(Sweden) Lina Hurtig	(Italy) Juventus	Arsenal	
19 August 2022	(Australia) Clare Wheeler	(Denmark) Fortuna Hjørring	Everton (loan)	
19 August 2022	Simran Jhamat	Bristol City	Coventry United	
19 August 2022	(Wales) Meesha Dudley-Jones	Bridgwater United	Coventry United	
19 August 2022	Ebony Wiseman	Unattached	Coventry United	
19 August 2022	Rosetta Taylor	Unattached	Coventry United	
19 August 2022	(Wales) Hayley Hoare	Unattached	Coventry United	
19 August 2022	(Wales) Evie Gane	Watford	Coventry United	
19 August 2022	Arabella Suttie	Birmingham City	Coventry United	
19 August 2022	Megan Alexander	Oxford United	Coventry United	
19 August 2022	Jodie Bartle	(Scotland) Celtic	Coventry United	
20 August 2022	Frankie Angel	Brighton & Hove Albion	Lewes (dual registration)	
20 August 2022	Lauren Heria	London Bees	Lewes	
20 August 2022	(Nigeria) Ini-Abasi Umotong	Lewes	Retired	
21 August 2022	Millie Farrow	London City Lionesses	(United States) North Carolina Courage	
22 August 2022	Ellen White	Manchester City	Retired	
22 August 2022	Grace Garrad	West Ham United	Watford (dual registration)	
23 August 2022	Jorja Fox	Chelsea	Brighton & Hove Albion (loan)	
24 August 2022	Sokhara Goodall	London Bees	London City Lionesses	
24 August 2022	Grace Palmer	Chelsea	Lewes	
24 August 2022	Emily Roberts	Durham	Retired	
25 August 2022	Aggie Beever-Jones	Chelsea	Everton (loan)	
26 August 2022	Olivia Rabjohn	Aston Villa	Coventry United (dual registration)	
26 August 2022	(Serbia) Jelena Čanković	(Sweden) Rosengård	Chelsea	
27 August 2022	(Germany) Shanell Salgado	Lewes	Blackburn Rovers	
28 August 2022	(Japan) Risa Shimizu	(Japan) Tokyo Verdy Beleza	West Ham United	
7 September 2022	(Norway) Elise Stenevik	(Sweden) Eskilstuna United	Everton	
7 September 2022	Keira Walsh	Manchester City	(Spain) Barcelona	
8 September 2022	(Scotland) Kirsty Hanson	Manchester United	Aston Villa (loan)	
8 September 2022	Charlotte Wardlaw	Chelsea	Liverpool (loan)	
8 September 2022	(Japan) Yui Hasegawa	West Ham United	Manchester City	
8 September 2022	(Japan) Honoka Hayashi	(Sweden) AIK	West Ham United	
8 September 2022	Ellen Jones	(United States) Colorado Buffaloes	Leicester City	
12 September 2022	(Brazil) Giovana	(Spain) Barcelona	Arsenal	
12 September 2022	(Brazil) Giovana	Arsenal	Everton (loan)	
12 September 2022	Eleanor Heeps	Tottenham Hotspur	Coventry United (loan)	
12 September 2022	(Wales) Esther Morgan	Tottenham Hotspur	Coventry United (loan)	
12 September 2022	(Gibraltar) Charlyann Pizzarello	Unattached	Lewes	
13 September 2022	Lucy Watson	Charlton Athletic	Chelsea (end of loan)	
13 September 2022	(Wales) Zoe Smith	(Wales) Cardiff City Ladies	Lewes	
15 September 2022	Faye Kirby	Everton	Liverpool	
15 September 2022	(Netherlands) Jackie Groenen	Manchester United	(France) Paris Saint-Germain	
15 September 2022	Chloe Dixon	Unattached	Blackburn Rovers	
16 September 2022	(Northern Ireland) Demi Vance	(Scotland) Rangers	Leicester City	
16 September 2022	(Wales) Charlie Estcourt	Coventry United	Birmingham City	
16 September 2022	Nicola Worthington	Burnley	Blackburn Rovers	
16 September 2022	Ellie Butler	Wolverhampton Wanderers	Coventry United	
18 September 2022	(Canada) Emily Moore	West Ham United	Lewes	
23 September 2022	(Wales) Mary McAteer	Aston Villa	Coventry United (dual registration)	

Player was released to free agency before joining new club
