= 2021–22 Aston Villa W.F.C. season =

Aston Villa
2021–22 season
- Owner: NSWE Group
- Chairman: Nassef Sawiris
- Manager: Carla Ward
- Stadium: Bescot Stadium, Walsall
- FA WSL: 9th
- FA Cup: Fourth round
- League Cup: Group stage
- Top goalscorer: League: Remi Allen (3 goals); All: Remi Allen (5 goals)
- Highest home attendance: 8,367 (vs. Birmingham City, 8 May)
- Lowest home attendance: 324 (vs. Everton, 2 March)
- Average home league attendance: 1,639
Home colours	Away colours	Third colours

The 2021–22 Aston Villa W.F.C. season was the club's 26th season under their Aston Villa affiliation, the organisation's 48th overall season in existence and their second season in the FA Women's Super League. Along with competing in the WSL, the club also contested two domestic cup competitions: the FA Cup and the League Cup.

On 20 May 2021, Carla Ward was named as manager having resigned as manager of WSL rivals Birmingham City a week earlier. She replaced interim manager Marcus Bignot and departing head coach Gemma Davies who were both sacked at the end of the previous season.

== Current squad ==
As of 17 February 2022

Note: Flags indicate national team as defined under FIFA eligibility rules; some limited exceptions apply. Players may hold more than one non-FIFA nationality.

No.	Pos.	Nation	Player
1	GK	ENG	Hannah Hampton
2	MF	ENG	Sarah Mayling
3	DF	ENG	Meaghan Sargeant
4	MF	ENG	Remi Allen
6	DF	ENG	Anita Asante
7	FW	SUI	Alisha Lehmann
8	MF	SCO	Chloe Arthur
9	FW	AUS	Emily Gielnik
10	MF	GER	Ramona Petzelberger
11	FW	ENG	Chantelle Boye-Hlorkah
12	FW	ENG	Jodie Hutton

No.	Pos.	Nation	Player
16	DF	ENG	Olivia McLoughlin
17	FW	ENG	Sophie Haywood
19	MF	ENG	Laura Blindkilde
20	MF	ENG	Jill Scott (on loan from Manchester City)
22	FW	JAM	Shania Hayles
23	GK	ENG	Sian Rogers
31	FW	IRL	Ruesha Littlejohn
33	DF	ENG	Maz Pacheco
42	DF	SCO	Rachel Corsie
44	DF	ENG	Anna Patten (on loan from Arsenal)

== Preseason ==
14 August 2021 Friendly	Manchester United	2–0	Aston Villa	Carrington
16:30 BST	Thomas 4'; Hanson 17'	Report		Stadium: Trafford Training Centre; Attendance: Behind-closed-doors

21 August 2021 Friendly	Aston Villa	1–3	Everton	Walsall
12:30 BST	Petzelberger 48'	Report	Emslie 28'; Christiansen 53' (pen.); Clinton 65'	Stadium: Bescot Stadium

27 August 2021 Friendly	Chelsea	1–0	Aston Villa	Kingston upon Thames
12:30 BST	England 23'	Report		Stadium: Kingsmeadow

== FA Women's Super League ==
=== Results summary ===
Overall								Home						Away					
Pld	W	D	L	GF	GA	GD	Pts	W	D	L	GF	GA	GD	W	D	L	GF	GA	GD
22	6	3	13	13	40	−27	21	1	2	8	5	17	−12	5	1	5	8	23	−15

Last updated: 8 May 2022.
Source: FA WSL

=== Results by matchday ===
Round	1	2	3	4	5	6	7	8	9	10	11	12	13	14	15	16	17	18	19	20	21	22
Ground	H	A	A	H	A	H	A	A	H	A	H	A	H	A	H	H	A	H	A	H	A	H
Result	W	D	W	L	L	L	W	L	L	L	L	W	L	W	L	L	L	D	W	D	L	L
Position	5	5	3	6	7	8	6	10	10	10	10	9	9	9	9	9	10	10	9	9	9	9

A = Away; H = Home; W = Win; D = Draw; L = Loss

=== Results ===
4 September 2021 1	Aston Villa	2–1	Leicester City	Walsall
12:30	Hutton (yellow card) 36'; Asante (yellow card) 59'; Mayling 63'; Allen 64'	Report	Flint 39'; Tierney (yellow card) 79'; McManus (yellow card) 82'; Brougham (yellow card) 84'	Stadium: Bescot Stadium; Attendance: 741; Referee: Helen Conley

11 September 2021 2	West Ham United	1–1	Aston Villa	Dagenham
11:30	Leon 8'; Stringer (yellow card) 65'	Report	Littlejohn (yellow card) 66'; Allen 90+2'	Stadium: Victoria Road; Attendance: 1,106; Referee: Kirsty Dowle

26 September 2021 3	Brighton & Hove Albion	0–1	Aston Villa	Crawley
14:00		Report	Gielnik 48'	Stadium: Broadfield Stadium; Attendance: 1,140; Referee: Lisa Benn

2 October 2021 4	Aston Villa	0–4	Arsenal	Aston
17:15	Pacheco (yellow card) 57'	Report	Little 51', 90+2'; Iwabuchi 80'; McCabe 83'	Stadium: Villa Park; Attendance: 4,780; Referee: Emily Heaslip

10 October 2021 5	Reading	3–0	Aston Villa	Reading
14:00	Eikeland 16'; Rowe 19'; Dowie 45+3'; Vanhaevermaet (yellow card) 73'	Report		Stadium: Madejski Stadium; Attendance: 578; Referee: Louise Saunders

6 November 2021 6	Aston Villa	0–1	Chelsea	Walsall
12:30	Allen (yellow card) 56'	Report	Fleming 22'; Ingle (yellow card) 28'; Andersson (yellow card) 90+1'	Stadium: Bescot Stadium; Attendance: 715; Referee: Abigail Byrne

14 November 2021 7	Birmingham City	0–1	Aston Villa	Birmingham
14:00	Sarri (yellow card) 75'; Robertson (yellow card) 90+1'	Report	Arthur (yellow card) 22'; Asante 25'; Lehmann (yellow card) 55'; Pacheco (yellow card) 90+3'	Stadium: St Andrew's; Attendance: 1,386; Referee: Kirsty Dowle

20 November 2021 8	Manchester City	5–0	Aston Villa	Manchester
11:30	Weir 48'; Stanway 51'; Raso 77', 81'; Hemp 78'	Report		Stadium: Academy Stadium; Attendance: 1,098; Referee: Abigail Byrne

12 December 2021 9	Aston Villa	1–2	Tottenham Hotspur	Walsall
18:00	Allen 19', (yellow card) 77'; Littlejohn (yellow card) 45'	Report	Simon 29' (pen.); Williams (yellow card) 45', (goal) 68'; Clemaron (yellow card) 62'	Stadium: Bescot Stadium; Attendance: 385; Referee: Kirsty Dowle

19 December 2021 10	Manchester United	5–0	Aston Villa	Leigh
12:00	Toone 8', 79'; Zelem 13' (pen.); Staniforth 50'; Thomas 73'; Hanson (yellow card) 76'; Ladd (yellow card) 90+1'	Report	Littlejohn (yellow card) 52'; Mayling (yellow card) 81'; Boye-Hlorkah (yellow card) 87'	Stadium: Leigh Sports Village; Attendance: 1,001; Referee: Rebecca Welch

8 January 2022	Aston Villa	P–P	Everton	Walsall
12:30				Stadium: Bescot Stadium
Note: Postponed due to a COVID-19 outbreak at Everton

15 January 2022 11	Aston Villa	0–3	Manchester City	Walsall
12:30		Report	Stanway 5', 75'; Losada 41'; Greenwood (yellow card) 58'	Stadium: Bescot Stadium; Attendance: 483; Referee: Louise Saunders
Note: Kickoff delayed until 13:00 due to pitch inspection

23 January 2022 12	Leicester City	1–2	Aston Villa	Burton upon Trent
14:00	Hampton 76' (o.g.)	Report	Purfield 4' (o.g.); Hayles (yellow card) 31'; Hampton (yellow card) 77'; Lehmann 90+3'	Stadium: Pirelli Stadium; Attendance: 616; Referee: Elizabeth Simms

6 February 2022 13	Aston Villa	1–2	West Ham United	Walsall
18:00	Lehmann 42' (pen.)	Report	Stringer 12', (yellow card) 36'; Walker (yellow card) 40'; Svitková 52'; Longhurst (yellow card) 60'	Stadium: Bescot Stadium; Attendance: 334; Referee: Lucy May

13 February 2022 14	Everton	0–2	Aston Villa	Liverpool
13:00		Report	Gielnik 17'; Petzelberger 23'; Littlejohn (yellow card) 81'	Stadium: Walton Hall Park; Attendance: 419; Referee: Elizabeth Simms

2 March 2022 15	Aston Villa	0–1	Everton	Walsall
19:00	Mayling (yellow card) 90+4'	Report	Graham (yellow card) 11'; Galli 80'; Dali (yellow card) 90+4'	Stadium: Bescot Stadium; Attendance: 324; Referee: Robert Massey-Ellis
Note: Rescheduled from 8 January 2022

5 March 2022 16	Aston Villa	0–1	Brighton & Hove Albion	Walsall
11:30		Report	Le Tissier 28'; Carter (yellow card) 90+3'	Stadium: Bescot Stadium; Attendance: 496; Referee: Louise Saunders

13 March 2022 17	Chelsea	1–0	Aston Villa	Kingston upon Thames
14:00		Report	Kerr 90+2', (yellow card) 90+2'	Stadium: Kingsmeadow; Attendance: 2,655; Referee: Abigail Byrne

26 March 2022 18	Aston Villa	1–1	Reading	Walsall
12:30	Petzelberger 76'; Corsie (yellow card) 89'	Report	Vanhaevermaet 69' (pen.)	Stadium: Bescot Stadium; Attendance: 461; Referee: Lauren Impey

3 April 2022 19	Tottenham Hotspur	0–1	Aston Villa	Canons Park
14:00	Clemaron (yellow card) 87'	Report	Petzelberger 87'; Pacheco (yellow card) 90+3'	Stadium: The Hive; Attendance: 508; Referee: Farai Hallam

24 April 2022 20	Aston Villa	0–0	Manchester United	Walsall
18:00		Report		Stadium: Bescot Stadium; Attendance: 941; Referee: Emily Heaslip

1 May 2022 21	Arsenal	7–0	Aston Villa	Borehamwood
14:15	Miedema 9', 13'; Corsie 52' (o.g.); Mead 61'; Wubben-Moy 66'; Blackstenius 83'; Parris 90' (pen.); Foord (yellow card) 90+1'	Report	Petzelberger (yellow card) 54'	Stadium: Meadow Park; Attendance: 2,305; Referee: Lisa Benn

8 May 2022 22	Aston Villa	0–1	Birmingham City	Aston
12:00	Asante (yellow card) 45'	Report	Sarri 10'	Stadium: Villa Park; Attendance: 8,367; Referee: Rebecca Welch

=== League table ===
Pos	Team	Pld	W	D	L	GF	GA	GD	Pts
7	Brighton & Hove Albion	22	8	2	12	24	38	−14	26
8	Reading	22	7	4	11	21	40	−19	25
9	Aston Villa	22	6	3	13	13	40	−27	21
10	Everton	22	5	5	12	18	41	−23	20
11	Leicester City	22	4	1	17	14	53	−39	13

Source: FA WSL
Rules for classification: 1) Points; 2) Goal difference; 3) Number of goals scored.

== Women's FA Cup ==
As a member of the first tier, Aston Villa entered the FA Cup in the fourth round proper.

29 January 2022 Fourth round	Aston Villa	1–3	Chelsea	Walsall
13:00	Petzelberger 90+5' (pen.)	Report	Reiten 18', 62'; Harder 28' (pen.)	Stadium: Bescot Stadium; Attendance: 1,093; Referee: Abigail Bryne

== FA Women's League Cup ==
=== Group stage ===
13 October 2021 Group stage	Liverpool	1–1 (5–4 p)	Aston Villa	Birkenhead
19:00	Kiernan 66'; Lawley (yellow card) 74'	Report	Hayles 2'	Stadium: Prenton Park
	Penalties
	Bailey (penalty scored); Holland (penalty scored); Daniëls (penalty scored); Robe (penalty scored); Hodson (penalty scored)		(penalty missed) Boye-Hlorkah; (penalty scored) Allen; (penalty scored) Mayling; (penalty scored) Hutton; (penalty scored) Petzelberger

17 November 2021 Group stage	Aston Villa	1–2	Sheffield United	Walsall
19:30	Boye-Hlorkah 48', (yellow card) 65'; Davison (yellow card) 70'	Report	Lipka 11'; Sweetman-Kirk 20'; Roberts (yellow card) 61'	Stadium: Bescot Stadium

5 December 2021 Group stage	Sunderland	0–7	Aston Villa	Hetton-le-Hole
12:00	Herron (yellow card) 35'	Report	Blindkilde 1'; Petzelberger 10'; Littlejohn (yellow card) 26'; Allen 41', 90'; Lehmann 72', 76'; Boye-Hlorkah 84'	Stadium: Eppleton CW

15 December 2021 Group stage	Aston Villa	0–1	Blackburn Rovers	Walsall
19:45		Report	Leek 69'	Stadium: Bescot Stadium

Pos	Team	Pld	W	WPEN	LPEN	L	GF	GA	GD	Pts	Qualification	LIV	SUN	BLB	SHU	AST
1	Liverpool	4	1	2	1	0	3	2	+1	8	Advances to knock-out stage	—	—	2–1	—	1–1
2	Sunderland	4	1	2	0	1	3	9	−6	7	Possible knock-out stage based on ranking	0–0	—	—	—	—
3	Blackburn Rovers	4	2	0	0	2	4	4	0	6		—	1–2	—	1–0	—
4	Sheffield United	4	1	0	2	1	3	3	0	5		0–0	1–1	—	—	0–7
5	Aston Villa	4	1	0	1	2	9	4	+5	4		—	—	0–1	1–2	—

Source: thefa.com
Rules for classification: 1) Points; 2) Goal difference; 3) Number of goals scored; 4) Number of wins; 5) Head-to-head record

== Squad statistics ==
=== Appearances ===
As of 8 May 2022

Starting appearances are listed first, followed by substitute appearances after the + symbol where applicable.

No.	Pos	Nat	Player	Total		FA WSL		FA Cup		League Cup	
No.	Pos	Nat	Player	Apps	Goals	Apps	Goals	Apps	Goals	Apps	Goals
1	GK	(England) ENG	Hannah Hampton	22	0	20	0	1	0	0+1	0
2	MF	(England) ENG	Sarah Mayling	25	1	21	1	1	0	2+1	0
3	DF	(England) ENG	Meaghan Sargeant	13	0	10+2	0	0	0	1	0
4	MF	(England) ENG	Remi Allen	22	5	19	3	1	0	1+1	2
6	DF	(England) ENG	Anita Asante	23	1	21	1	1	0	1	0
7	FW	(Switzerland) SUI	Alisha Lehmann	23	4	21	2	0	0	2	2
8	MF	(Scotland) SCO	Chloe Arthur	21	0	12+5	0	1	0	0+3	0
9	FW	(Australia) AUS	Emily Gielnik	17	2	13+2	2	0	0	1+1	0
10	MF	(Germany) GER	Ramona Petzelberger	23	4	18+1	2	1	1	2+1	1
11	FW	(England) ENG	Chantelle Boye-Hlorkah	22	2	11+7	0	0	0	2+2	2
12	FW	(England) ENG	Jodie Hutton	9	0	1+3	0	0+1	0	3+1	0
16	DF	(England) ENG	Olivia McLoughlin	14	0	3+7	0	0+1	0	3	0
17	FW	(England) ENG	Sophie Haywood	0	0	0	0	0	0	0	0
19	MF	(England) ENG	Laura Blindkilde	15	1	7+4	0	0+1	0	3	1
20	MF	(England) ENG	Jill Scott	8	0	6+1	0	1	0	0	0
22	FW	(Jamaica) JAM	Shania Hayles	17	1	3+10	0	1	0	3	1
23	GK	(England) ENG	Sian Rogers	7	0	2+1	0	0	0	4	0
24	MF	(England) ENG	Olivia Rabjohn	1	0	0	0	0	0	1	0
26	FW	(England) ENG	Isobel Goodwin	1	0	0	0	0	0	0+1	0
27	FW	(England) ENG	Missy Goodwin	1	0	0	0	0	0	0+1	0
28	DF	(England) ENG	Evie Rabjohn	1	0	0	0	0	0	1	0
31	FW	(Republic of Ireland) IRL	Ruesha Littlejohn	20	0	11+6	0	1	0	2	0
32	MF	(Wales) WAL	Mary McAteer	1	0	0	0	0	0	0+1	0
33	DF	(England) ENG	Maz Pacheco	25	0	22	0	1	0	1+1	0
42	DF	(Scotland) SCO	Rachel Corsie	7	0	5+1	0	0+1	0	0	0
44	DF	(England) ENG	Anna Patten	8	0	7	0	1	0	0	0
Players away from the club on loan:
5	DF	(England) ENG	Elisha N'Dow	10	0	5+2	0	0	0	2+1	0
15	DF	(England) ENG	Natalie Haigh	4	0	0+1	0	0	0	3	0
18	MF	(England) ENG	Freya Gregory	6	0	1+2	0	0	0	2+1	0
Players who appeared for the club but left during the season:
20	FW	(England) ENG	Gemma Davison	7	0	0+3	0	0	0	3+1	0
21	MF	(Germany) GER	Marisa Ewers	9	0	3+2	0	0+1	0	2+1	0

== Transfers ==
=== Transfers in ===
Date	Position	Nationality	Name	From	Ref.
30 June 2021	FW	(Switzerland)	Alisha Lehmann	(England) West Ham United	
1 July 2021	MF	(England)	Remi Allen	(England) Leicester City	
2 July 2021	MF	(England)	Sarah Mayling	(England) Birmingham City	
2 July 2021	FW	(England)	Chantelle Boye-Hlorkah	(England) Everton	
3 July 2021	DF	(England)	Meaghan Sargeant	(England) Bristol City	
3 July 2021	GK	(England)	Hannah Hampton	(England) Birmingham City	
16 August 2021	DF	(England)	Maz Pacheco	(England) West Ham United	
1 September 2021	FW	(Republic of Ireland)	Ruesha Littlejohn	(England) Birmingham City	
2 September 2021	FW	(Australia)	Emily Gielnik	(Sweden) Vittsjö GIK	
3 September 2021	FW	(England)	Gemma Davison	(England) Tottenham Hotspur	
27 January 2022	DF	(Scotland)	Rachel Corsie	(United States) Kansas City Current	

=== Loans in ===
Date	Position	Nationality	Name	From	Until	Ref.
4 January 2022	DF	(England)	Anna Patten	(England) Arsenal	End of season	
25 January 2022	MF	(England)	Jill Scott	(England) Manchester City	End of season	

=== Transfers out ===
Date	Position	Nationality	Name	To	Ref.
18 May 2021	DF	(England)	Ella Franklin-Fraiture		
18 May 2021	MF	(England)	Emma Follis	(England) Charlton Athletic	
18 May 2021	MF	(England)	Amy West	(England) Nottingham Forest	
18 May 2021	DF	(Germany)	Caroline Siems	(Germany) Bayer Leverkusen	
18 May 2021	FW	(Portugal)	Diana Silva	(Portugal) Sporting CP	
18 May 2021	FW	(Japan)	Mana Iwabuchi	(England) Arsenal	
18 May 2021	MF	(Netherlands)	Nadine Hanssen		
18 June 2021	FW	(Denmark)	Stine Larsen	(Sweden) BK Häcken	
6 August 2021	DF	(England)	Asmita Ale	(England) Tottenham Hotspur	
19 August 2021	GK	(Germany)	Lisa Weiß	(Germany) Wolfsburg	
4 January 2022	FW	(England)	Gemma Davison	(England) Watford	
7 January 2022	FW	(England)	Missy Goodwin	(England) Leicester City	
26 January 2022	MF	(England)	Emily Syme	(England) Bristol City	
17 February 2022	MF	(Germany)	Marisa Ewers	Retired	

=== Loans out ===
Date	Position	Nationality	Name	To	Until	Ref.
3 September 2021	MF	(England)	Emily Syme	(England) Sheffield United	26 January 2022	
7 January 2022	MF	(England)	Freya Gregory	(England) Leicester City	End of season	
18 January 2022	DF	(England)	Natalie Haigh	(England) Coventry United	End of season	
27 January 2022	DF	(England)	Elisha N'Dow	(England) Coventry United	End of season	
