= 2019–20 Aston Villa W.F.C. season =

Coordinates: 52°32′30.300″N 1°50′32.690″W

Aston Villa
2019–20 season
- Owner: NSWE Group
- Chairman: Nassef Sawiris
- Manager: Gemma Davies
- Stadium: Trevor Brown Memorial Ground, Boldmere
- Championship: 1st (promoted)
- League Cup: Quarter-final
- FA Cup: Fourth round
- Top goalscorer: League: Melissa Johnson (12); All: Melissa Johnson (13)
| colours | colours | colours |

The 2019–20 Aston Villa W.F.C. season was the club's 24th season under their current Aston Villa affiliation and the organisation's 47th overall season in existence. It was their sixth consecutive full season in the FA Women's Championship, formerly the FA WSL 2. Along with competing in the Championship, the club also contested two domestic cup competitions: the FA Cup and the League Cup.

On 13 March 2020, in line with the FA's response to the coronavirus pandemic, it was announced the season was temporarily suspended until at least 3 April 2020. After further postponements, the season was ultimately ended prematurely on 25 May 2020 with immediate effect. Aston Villa sat six points clear at the top of the table at the time and were awarded the Championship title and promoted on sporting merit after The FA Board's decision to award places on a points-per-game basis.

== Current squad ==
As of 4 February 2020.

Note: Flags indicate national team as defined under FIFA eligibility rules; some limited exceptions apply. Players may hold more than one non-FIFA nationality.

| No. | Pos. | Nation | Player |
|---|---|---|---|
| 1 | GK | ENG | Sian Rogers |
| 2 | DF | ENG | Charlotte Greengrass |
| 3 | DF | ENG | Asmita Ale |
| 4 | DF | ENG | Ella Franklin-Fraiture |
| 5 | DF | ENG | Elisha N'Dow |
| 6 | DF | ENG | Jade Richards |
| 7 | MF | ENG | Alice Hassall |
| 9 | FW | ENG | Melissa Johnson |
| 10 | FW | ENG | Kerri Welsh |
| 11 | MF | ENG | Amy West |
| 12 | FW | ENG | Jodie Hutton |

| No. | Pos. | Nation | Player |
|---|---|---|---|
| 14 | MF | ENG | Emily Syme |
| 15 | DF | ENG | Natalie Haigh |
| 17 | FW | ENG | Sophie Haywood |
| 18 | GK | POL | Daniela Kosinska |
| 20 | MF | IRL | Phoebe Warner (Note: Dual registration with loan-club Nottingham Forest and remains eligible for Aston Villa when called upon) |
| 21 | MF | GER | Marisa Ewers |
| 22 | FW | ENG | Shania Hayles |
| 23 | MF | NED | Nadine Hanssen |
| 27 | MF | ENG | Emma Follis |
| 28 | MF | AUT | Sophie Maierhofer |

== FA Women's Championship ==
=== Results summary ===
| Overall | | | | | | | | Home | | | | | | Away | | | | | |
| Pld | W | D | L | GF | GA | GD | Pts | W | D | L | GF | GA | GD | W | D | L | GF | GA | GD |
|---|---|---|---|---|---|---|---|---|---|---|---|---|---|---|---|---|---|---|---|
| 14 | 13 | 1 | 0 | 39 | 11 | +28 | 40 | 7 | 1 | 0 | 20 | 6 | +14 | 6 | 0 | 0 | 19 | 5 | +14 |

Last updated: 23 February 2020.
Source: FA WSL

=== Matches ===
| 18 August 2019 1 | Aston Villa | 3–2 | Sheffield United | Boldmere |
| | Johnson 42', 54', 66' | Report | Fergusson 10'; Wilkinson 22' (pen.) | Stadium: Trevor Brown Memorial Ground; Attendance: 500; Referee: Robert Massey-Ellis |

| 25 August 2019 2 | London City Lionesses | 2–3 | Aston Villa | Dartford |
| | Ejupi 29', 50' | Report | West 10'; N'Dow (yellow card) 61'; Haigh 65'; Hayles 67' | Stadium: Princes Park |

| 8 September 2019 3 | Aston Villa | 2–1 | Blackburn Rovers | Boldmere |
| | Johnson 28'; Ewers 54' | Report | Fenton (yellow card) 24'; Taylor 55', (yellow card) 90+2' | Stadium: Trevor Brown Memorial Ground; Attendance: 1,261 |

| 15 September 2019 4 | Crystal Palace | 0–6 | Aston Villa | Bromley |
| | | Report | Johnson 1', 55', 60'; Follis 45'; West 79'; Hayles 86' | Stadium: Hayes Lane |

| 12 October 2019 5 | Charlton Athletic | 0–4 | Aston Villa | Crayford |
| | | Report | Johnson 24', 78', 90'; Follis 68' | Stadium: The Oakwood; Attendance: 913; Referee: Emily Heaslip |

| 27 October 2019 6 | Aston Villa | 1–1 | Durham | Boldmere |
| | Hanssen 56'; Follis (yellow card) 79' | Report | Gears 8'; Christon (yellow card) 42' | Stadium: Trevor Brown Memorial Ground; Attendance: 427; Referee: Emily Carney |

| 17 November 2019 7 | Coventry United | 2–3 | Aston Villa | Coventry |
| | Hughes 15'; O'Brien 54'; Weston (yellow card) 87' | Report | Hayles 10'; Hanssen 25'; Welsh 39' | Stadium: Butts Park Arena; Attendance: 910; Referee: Daniel Robinson |

| 24 November 2019 8 | Aston Villa | 1–0 | Lewes | Boldmere |
| | Hanssen 52' | Report | Cleverly (yellow card) 32'; Hayes (yellow card) 89' | Stadium: Trevor Brown Memorial Ground; Attendance: 355; Referee: Magdalena Golba |

| 1 December 2019 9 | London Bees | 1–2 | Aston Villa | Canons Park |
| | Pickett 44'; Gibson (yellow card) 72' | Report | West 24'; Follis 74' | Stadium: The Hive Stadium; Attendance: 200; Referee: Sunny Gill |

| 7 December 2019 10 | Aston Villa | 3–1 | Leicester City | Boldmere |
| | Ewers 78'; Johnson 86'; Hayles 90+4' | Report | Thomas 89' | Stadium: Trevor Brown Memorial Ground; Attendance: 370; Referee: Richie Watkins |

| 15 December 2019 11 | Aston Villa | 3–1 | London City Lionesses | Boldmere |
| | Follis 11'; Syme 26'; Ewers 75' | Report | Mason 6' | Stadium: Trevor Brown Memorial Ground; Attendance: 343; Referee: Melissa Burgin |

| 12 January 2020 12 | Sheffield United | 0–1 | Aston Villa | Chesterfield |
| | | Report | Follis 56' | Stadium: Proact Stadium; Attendance: 1,157; Referee: Cristiana Hattersley |

| 2 February 2020 13 | Aston Villa | 3–0 | Chalrton Athletic | Boldmere |
| | Hayles 1'; Follis 87'; Johnson 90' | Report | | Stadium: Trevor Brown Memorial Ground |

| 9 February 2020 | Durham | P–P | Aston Villa | Durham |
| | | | | Stadium: New Ferens Park |
Note: All Championship games postponed due to adverse weather conditions

| 23 February 2020 14 | Aston Villa | 4–0 | Coventry United | Boldmere |
| | Richards 11'; Hayles 12', 25', 67' | Report | | Stadium: Trevor Brown Memorial Ground |

| 22 March 2020 15 | Lewes | Cancelled | Aston Villa | Lewes |
| | | | | Stadium: The Dripping Pan |
Note: Cancelled due to coronavirus pandemic

| 29 March 2020 16 | Aston Villa | Cancelled | London Bees | Boldmere |
| | | | | Stadium: Trevor Brown Memorial Ground |
Note: Cancelled due to coronavirus pandemic

| 5 April 2020 17 | Leicester City | Cancelled | Aston Villa | Quorn |
| | | | | Stadium: Farley Way Stadium |
Note: Cancelled due to coronavirus pandemic

| 19 April 2020 18 | Blackburn Rovers | Cancelled | Aston Villa | Bamber Bridge |
| | | | | Stadium: Irongate |
Note: Cancelled due to coronavirus pandemic

| 26 April 2020 19 | Aston Villa | Cancelled | Crystal Palace | Boldmere |
| | | | | Stadium: Trevor Brown Memorial Ground |
Note: Cancelled due to coronavirus pandemic

| 20 | Durham | Cancelled | Aston Villa | Durham |
| | | | | Stadium: New Ferens Park |
Note: Rescheduled from 9 February 2020. Cancelled due to coronavirus pandemic

=== League table ===
| Pos | Team | Pld | W | D | L | GF | GA | GD | Pts | PPG | Qualification |
|---|---|---|---|---|---|---|---|---|---|---|---|
| 1 | Aston Villa (C, P) | 14 | 13 | 1 | 0 | 39 | 11 | +28 | 40 | 2.86 | Promotion to the WSL (Note: Dependent on obtaining a licence.) |
| 2 | Sheffield United | 14 | 11 | 1 | 2 | 46 | 16 | +30 | 34 | 2.43 | |
| 3 | Durham | 14 | 10 | 2 | 2 | 33 | 10 | +23 | 32 | 2.29 | |
| 4 | London City Lionesses | 15 | 8 | 2 | 5 | 25 | 24 | +1 | 26 | 1.73 | |
| 5 | London Bees | 12 | 4 | 3 | 5 | 16 | 19 | −3 | 15 | 1.25 | |

Rules for classification: 1) Points; 2) Goal difference; 3) Number of goals scored
(C) Champions; (P) Promoted

== Women's FA Cup ==
As a member of the top two tiers, Aston Villa entered the FA Cup in the fourth round, losing to FA WSL team Brighton & Hove Albion in their opening fixture.

| 26 January 2020 Fourth round | Aston Villa | 2–3 | Brighton & Hove Albion | Boldmere |
| | Hayles 14', 81' | Report | Umotong 11' (pen.); A. Whelan 30'; Nildén 35' | Stadium: Trevor Brown Memorial Ground |

== FA Women's League Cup ==
=== Group stage ===
| 22 September 2019 Group stage | Durham | 3–0 | Aston Villa | Durham |
| 12:00 | Sharpe 14', 27'; Holmes (yellow card) 55', (goal) 65' | Report | | Stadium: New Ferens Park; Attendance: 359; Referee: Jonny Urwin |

| 19 October 2019 Group stage | Aston Villa | 3–1 | Sheffield United | Boldmere |
| 19:30 | Richards 20', (red card) 90+4'; Syme 23'; Hayles 52' | Report | Pennock 69'; Dixon (yellow card) 78' | Stadium: Trevor Brown Memorial Ground; Attendance: 405; Referee: Ashley List |

| 2 November 2019 Group stage | Aston Villa | 2–0 | Liverpool | Boldmere |
| 19:30 | Follis 6'; N'Dow (yellow card) 65'; Syme 86' | Report | Charles (yellow card) 44'; Linnett (yellow card) 45' | Stadium: Trevor Brown Memorial Ground; Attendance: 355; Referee: Scott Tallis |

| 20 November 2019 Group stage | Coventry United | 2–2 (3–1 p) | Aston Villa | Coventry |
| 19:45 | Hughes 3'; Dermody 33' | Report | Warner 1'; Haywood 50' | Stadium: Butts Park Arena; Attendance: 286; Referee: Amy Barber |
| | Penalties |
| | Worts (penalty scored); Axten (penalty scored); S. Johnson (penalty scored) | | (penalty scored) Ale; (penalty missed) Hutton; (penalty missed) Follis; (penalty missed) M. Johnson |

| 11 December 2019 Group stage | Aston Villa | 5–2 | Blackburn Rovers | Boldmere |
| 19:45 | Welsh 4'; Greengrass 12'; Hayles 49'; West 54'; Johnson 63' | Report | Stewart 31'; Thomas 57' | Stadium: Trevor Brown Memorial Ground; Attendance: 183; Referee: Andrew Humphries |

| Pos | Team | Pld | W | WPEN | LPEN | L | GF | GA | GD | Pts | Qualification | SHU | AST | LIV | DUR | COV | BLB |
|---|---|---|---|---|---|---|---|---|---|---|---|---|---|---|---|---|---|
| 1 | Sheffield United | 5 | 3 | 0 | 1 | 1 | 14 | 8 | +6 | 10 | Advance to Knock-out stage | — | — | — | — | 2–2 | 4–1 |
| 2 | Aston Villa | 5 | 3 | 0 | 1 | 1 | 12 | 8 | +4 | 10 | Advance to Knock-out stage | 3–1 | — | 2–0 | — | — | 5–2 |
| 3 | Liverpool | 5 | 3 | 0 | 0 | 2 | 16 | 7 | +9 | 9 | | 2–3 | — | — | 3–1 | — | — |
| 4 | Durham | 5 | 3 | 0 | 0 | 2 | 11 | 8 | +3 | 9 | | 0–4 | 3–0 | — | — | 4–0 | — |
| 5 | Coventry United | 5 | 0 | 3 | 0 | 2 | 6 | 14 | −8 | 6 | | — | 2–2 | 1–5 | — | — | 1–1 |
| 6 | Blackburn Rovers | 5 | 0 | 0 | 1 | 4 | 5 | 19 | −14 | 1 | | — | — | 0–6 | 1–3 | — | — |

Updated to match(es) played on 11 December 2019. Source: thefa.com
Rules for classification: 1) Points; 2) Goal difference; 3) Number of goals scored; 4) Number of wins; 5) Head-to-head record

=== Knockout phase ===
| 15 January 2020 Quarter-final | Chelsea | 3–1 | Aston Villa | Kingston upon Thames |
| | Eriksson 55'; Ingle (yellow card) 76'; Ji 81'; Murphy 90+1' | Report | Welsh 84' | Stadium: Kingsmeadow; Attendance: 1,799; Referee: Louise Saunders |

== Squad statistics ==
=== Appearances ===
Starting appearances are listed first, followed by substitute appearances after the + symbol where applicable.

| No. | Pos | Nat | Player | Total | | League | | FA Cup | | League Cup | |
| No. | Pos | Nat | Player | Apps | Goals | Apps | Goals | Apps | Goals | Apps | Goals |
|---|---|---|---|---|---|---|---|---|---|---|---|
| 1 | GK | (England) ENG | Sian Rodgers | 17 | 0 | 13 | 0 | 1 | 0 | 3 | 0 |
| 2 | DF | (England) ENG | Charlotte Greengrass | 7 | 1 | 0+3 | 0 | 0 | 0 | 3+1 | 1 |
| 3 | DF | (England) ENG | Asmita Ale | 18 | 0 | 12 | 0 | 1 | 0 | 5 | 0 |
| 4 | DF | (England) ENG | Ella Franklin-Fraiture | 8 | 0 | 6 | 0 | 0 | 0 | 2 | 0 |
| 5 | DF | (England) ENG | Elisha N'Dow | 19 | 0 | 13+1 | 0 | 1 | 0 | 4 | 0 |
| 6 | DF | (England) ENG | Jade Richards | 10 | 2 | 2+2 | 1 | 1 | 0 | 5 | 1 |
| 7 | MF | (England) ENG | Alice Hassall | 4 | 0 | 0+1 | 0 | 1 | 0 | 0+2 | 0 |
| 9 | FW | (England) ENG | Melissa Johnson | 20 | 13 | 10+4 | 12 | 1 | 0 | 3+2 | 1 |
| 10 | FW | (England) ENG | Kerri Welsh | 15 | 3 | 3+6 | 1 | 1 | 0 | 3+2 | 2 |
| 11 | MF | (England) ENG | Amy West | 20 | 4 | 12+2 | 3 | 1 | 0 | 4+1 | 1 |
| 12 | FW | (England) ENG | Jodie Hutton | 13 | 0 | 7+1 | 0 | 1 | 0 | 2+2 | 0 |
| 14 | MF | (England) ENG | Emily Syme | 19 | 3 | 9+5 | 1 | 0 | 0 | 4+1 | 2 |
| 15 | DF | (England) ENG | Natalie Haigh | 18 | 1 | 14 | 1 | 0 | 0 | 4 | 0 |
| 17 | FW | (England) ENG | Sophie Haywood | 18 | 1 | 10+3 | 0 | 0 | 0 | 4+1 | 1 |
| 18 | GK | (Poland) POL | Daniela Kosinska | 4 | 0 | 1 | 0 | 0 | 0 | 3 | 0 |
| 21 | MF | (Germany) GER | Marisa Ewers | 20 | 3 | 14 | 3 | 0 | 0 | 5+1 | 0 |
| 22 | FW | (England) ENG | Shania Hayles | 19 | 12 | 5+7 | 8 | 1 | 2 | 4+2 | 2 |
| 23 | MF | (Netherlands) NED | Nadine Hanssen | 17 | 3 | 10+1 | 3 | 1 | 0 | 4+1 | 0 |
| 27 | MF | (England) ENG | Emma Follis | 17 | 7 | 13+1 | 6 | 0 | 0 | 2+1 | 1 |
| 28 | MF | (Austria) AUT | Sophie Maierhofer | 1 | 0 | 0+1 | 0 | 0 | 0 | 0 | 0 |
Players away from the club on loan:
| 20 | MF | (Republic of Ireland) IRL | Phoebe Warner | 3 | 1 | 0+1 | 0 | 0 | 0 | 2 | 1 |

=== Goalscorers ===
| Rank | No. | Pos. | Name | Championship | FA Cup | League Cup | Total |
|---|---|---|---|---|---|---|---|
| 1 | 9 | FW | (England) Melissa Johnson | 12 | 0 | 1 | 13 |
| 2 | 22 | FW | (England) Shania Hayles | 8 | 2 | 2 | 12 |
| 3 | 27 | MF | (England) Emma Follis | 6 | 0 | 1 | 7 |
| 4 | 11 | MF | (England) Amy West | 3 | 0 | 1 | 4 |
| 5 | 10 | FW | (England) Kerri Welsh | 1 | 0 | 2 | 3 |
| 5 | 14 | MF | (England) Emily Syme | 1 | 0 | 2 | 3 |
| 5 | 21 | MF | (Germany) Marisa Ewers | 3 | 0 | 0 | 3 |
| 5 | 23 | MF | (Netherlands) Nadine Hanssen | 3 | 0 | 0 | 3 |
| 9 | 6 | DF | (England) Jade Richards | 1 | 0 | 1 | 2 |
| 10 | 2 | DF | (England) Charlotte Greengrass | 0 | 0 | 1 | 1 |
| 10 | 15 | DF | (England) Natalie Haigh | 1 | 0 | 0 | 1 |
| 10 | 17 | FW | (England) Sophie Haywood | 0 | 0 | 1 | 1 |
| 10 | 20 | MF | (Republic of Ireland) Phoebe Warner | 0 | 0 | 1 | 1 |
| Total | | | | 39 | 2 | 12 | 53 |

== Transfers ==
=== Transfers in ===
| Date | Position | Nationality | Name | From | Ref. |
|---|---|---|---|---|---|
| 4 July 2019 | MF | (Germany) | Marisa Ewers | (England) Birmingham City | |
| 4 July 2019 | DF | (England) | Ella Franklin-Fraiture | (England) Leicester City | |
| 4 July 2019 | FW | (England) | Melissa Johnson | (England) Leicester City | |
| 15 July 2019 | MF | (England) | Emily Syme | (England) Yeovil Town | |
| 22 July 2019 | FW | (England) | Shania Hayles | (England) Birmingham City | |
| 22 July 2019 | DF | (England) | Natalie Haigh | (England) Coventry United | |
| 22 July 2019 | DF | (England) | Charlotte Greengrass | (England) Leicester City | |
| 1 August 2019 | MF | (England) | Emma Follis | (England) Birmingham City | |
| 18 August 2019 | GK | (Poland) | Daniela Kosinska | (Poland) AZS PWSZ Biała Podlaska | |
| 4 February 2020 | MF | (Austria) | Sophie Maierhofer | (United States) Kansas Jayhawks | |

=== Transfers out ===
| Date | Position | Nationality | Name | To | Ref. |
|---|---|---|---|---|---|
| 2 June 2019 | FW | (England) | Natasha Baptiste | (England) Stoke City | |
| 2 June 2019 | DF | (England) | Ria Elsmore | (England) West Bromwich Albion | |
| 16 July 2019 | GK | (Canada) | Aja Aguirre | (England) Nottingham Forest | |
| 19 July 2019 | FW | (England) | Alison Hall | (England) Stoke City | |
| 19 July 2019 | DF | (England) | Ashlee Brown | (England) Coventry United | |
| 19 July 2019 | DF | (England) | Hayley Crackle | (England) Coventry United | |
| 19 July 2019 | MF | (England) | Hollie Gibson | (England) Stoke City | |
| 19 July 2019 | FW | (England) | Tanisha Smith | (England) Stoke City | |

=== Loans out ===
| Date | Position | Nationality | Name | To | Until | Ref. |
|---|---|---|---|---|---|---|
| 28 August 2019 | MF | (Republic of Ireland) | Phoebe Warner | (England) Nottingham Forest | End of season | |
