= 2017 Birmingham City L.F.C. season =

Birmingham City Ladies FC
2017 season
- Manager: Marc Skinner
- Stadium: The Autotech Stadium, Solihull
- FA WSL 1: 6th
- FA Women's Cup: Final

The 2017 season is Birmingham City Ladies Football Club's seventh season in the FA Women's Super League and at the top level of English women's football, being one of the league's foundation clubs. It is the club's first season as a fully integrated set-up of men's side Birmingham City FC. It is also the club's first season under manager Marc Skinner, following David Parker's departure in December 2016.

Following a reorganisation of top-level women's football in England, the 2017 season will only cover half of a traditional season's length, while the FA WSL shifts its calendar to match the traditional autumn-to-spring axis of football in Europe. For the same reason, there is no Champions League qualification nor relegation to be competed for.

== First team ==
As of 2 May 2017.

Note: Flags indicate national team as defined under FIFA eligibility rules; some limited exceptions apply. Players may hold more than one non-FIFA nationality.

| No. | Pos. | Nation | Player |
|---|---|---|---|
| 1 | GK | ENG | Sophie Baggaley |
| 2 | DF | ENG | Paige Williams |
| 3 | DF | ENG | Meaghan Sargeant |
| 4 | DF | ENG | Jess Carter |
| 6 | DF | ENG | Kerys Harrop (c) |
| 7 | FW | ENG | Freda Ayisi |
| 8 | MF | ENG | Sarah Mayling |
| 9 | FW | ENG | Ellen White |
| 10 | MF | GER | Bella Linden |
| 11 | MF | NOR | Andrine Hegerberg |
| 12 | MF | ENG | Abbey-Leigh Stringer |
| 13 | DF | GER | Marisa Ewers |

| No. | Pos. | Nation | Player |
|---|---|---|---|
| 14 | MF | ENG | Emma Follis |
| 15 | FW | ENG | Charlie Wellings |
| 16 | MF | ENG | Chloe Peplow |
| 18 | MF | ENG | Connie Schofield |
| 19 | DF | ENG | Emily Westwood (vc) |
| 23 | MF | ENG | Coral Haines |
| 24 | DF | ENG | Sian Johnson |
| 25 | DF | ENG | Aoife Mannion |
| 26 | FW | ENG | Keeley Davies |
| 27 | FW | ENG | Ellie Brazil |
| 30 | GK | GER | Ann-Katrin Berger |

== New contracts ==
| No. | Pos | Player | Contract end | Date | Source |
|---|---|---|---|---|---|
| 4 | DF | (England) Jess Carter | 2018 (Note: plus a further one-year option) | 12 January 2017 | |
| 6 | DF | (England) Kerys Harrop | 2018 | 31 January 2017 | |

== Transfers ==
=== In ===
| Entry date | Position | No. | Player | From club | Contract end | Fee | Ref. |
|---|---|---|---|---|---|---|---|
| 13 January 2017 | MF | 8 | (England) Sarah Mayling | (England) Aston Villa | 2017 | Undisclosed | |
| 13 January 2017 | FW | 9 | (England) Ellen White | (England) Notts County | 2018 (Note: plus a further one-year option) | Undisclosed | |
| 1 February 2017 | DF | 2 | (England) Paige Williams | (Italy) AGSM Verona | 2018 | Undisclosed | |
| 8 February 2017 | MF | 14 | (England) Emma Follis | (England) Reading | 2018 | Undisclosed | |

=== Out ===
| Exit date | Position | No. | Player | To club | Fee | Ref. |
|---|---|---|---|---|---|---|
| 22 December 2016 | MF | — | (England) Melissa Lawley | (England) Manchester City | Undisclosed | |
| 28 December 2016 | DF | — | (Germany) Corina Schröder | — | Free | |
| 28 December 2016 | MF | — | (England) Alex Windell | — | Free | |
| 30 January 2016 | FW | — | (England) Kirsty Linnett | (England) Notts County | Free | |

== Competitions ==
=== Women's Super League ===
==== Results summary ====
| Overall | | | | | | | | Home | | | | | | Away | | | | | |
| Pld | W | D | L | GF | GA | GD | Pts | W | D | L | GF | GA | GD | W | D | L | GF | GA | GD |
|---|---|---|---|---|---|---|---|---|---|---|---|---|---|---|---|---|---|---|---|
| 2 | 0 | 2 | 0 | 1 | 1 | 0 | 2 | 0 | 1 | 0 | 0 | 0 | 0 | 0 | 1 | 0 | 1 | 1 | 0 |

Last updated: 4 May 2017.
Source: BCLFC

==== Results by matchday ====
| Matchday | 1 | 2 | 3 | 4 | 5 | 6 | 7 | 8 |
|---|---|---|---|---|---|---|---|---|
| Ground | H | A | H | H | A | A | H | H |
| Result | D | D | | | | | | |
| Position | 2 | 5 | | | | | | |

Updated to match(es) played on 4 May 2017. Source: BCLFC
A = Away; H = Home; W = Win; D = Draw; L = Loss

==== Matches ====
| 23 April 2017 1 | Birmingham City | 0 – 0 | Sunderland | Solihull |
| 14:00 | | Report | | Stadium: The Autotech Stadium; Attendance: 442; Referee: Timothy Walker |

| 3 May 2017 2 | Manchester City | 1 – 1 | Birmingham City | Manchester |
| 19:00 | Bronze 58' | Report | Westwood 14' | Stadium: Academy Stadium; Referee: Joseph Johnson |

| 7 May 2017 4 | Birmingham City | 0 – 2 | Liverpool | Birmingham |
| 14:00 | | Report | Clarke 49'; Bonner 81' | Stadium: St. Andrews Stadium; Attendance: 1,110; Referee: Robert Dadley |

| 17 May 2017 4 | Birmingham City | – | Bristol City | Solihull |
| 19:45 | | | | Stadium: The Autotech Stadium |

| 20 May 2017 5 | Arsenal | 4–2 | Birmingham City | Canons Park |
| 13:00 BST | O'Reilly 44'; Van de Donk 55'; Carter (yellow card) 78'; Quinn 78', 90+1' | Report | Williams 1', 58' | Stadium: The Hive; Attendance: 1,070; Referee: Neil Morrison |

| 28 May 2017 6 | Reading | – | Birmingham City | High Wycombe |
| 14:00 | | | | Stadium: Adams Park |

| 31 May 2017 7 | Birmingham City | – | Yeovil Town | Solihull |
| 19:45 | | | | Stadium: The Autotech Stadium |

| 3 June 2017 8 | Birmingham City | 0–2 | Chelsea | Solihull |
| 15:30 | | Report | Bright 38'; Kirby 66' | Stadium: Damson Park; Attendance: 1,171; Referee: Daniel Middleton |

=== FA Cup ===
| 19 March 2017 Fifth round | Birmingham City | 2 – 0 | West Bromwich Albion | Solihull |
| | Carter 43'; White 60' | Report | | Stadium: The Autotech Stadium; Attendance: 1,122 |

| 26 March 2017 Sixth round | Birmingham City | 1 – 0 | Arsenal | Solihull |
| | Ewers 77' | Report | | Stadium: The Autotech Stadium; Attendance: 514 |

| 17 April 2017 Semi-final | Birmingham City | 1 – 1 (a.e.t.) (4 – 2 p) | Chelsea | Solihull |
| | Sargeant 64' | Report | Spence 88' | Stadium: Damson Park; Attendance: 1,425 |

| 13 May 2017 Final | Birmingham City | – | Manchester City | Wembley |
| | | | | Stadium: Wembley Stadium |

== Statistics ==
=== Appearances and goals ===
As of 4 May 2017

Players without any appearance are not included.

| No. | Pos | Nat | Player | Total | | FA WSL | | FA Cup | |
| No. | Pos | Nat | Player | Apps | Goals | Apps | Goals | Apps | Goals |
|---|---|---|---|---|---|---|---|---|---|
Goalkeepers:
| 1 | GK | (England) ENG | Sophie Baggaley | 1 | 0 | 1 | 0 | 0 | 0 |
| 30 | GK | (Germany) GER | Ann-Katrin Berger | 4 | 0 | 1 | 0 | 3 | 0 |
Defenders:
| 2 | DF | (England) ENG | Paige Williams | 5 | 0 | 1+1 | 0 | 3 | 0 |
| 3 | DF | (England) ENG | Meaghan Sargeant | 5 | 1 | 2 | 0 | 2+1 | 1 |
| 4 | DF | (England) ENG | Jess Carter | 5 | 1 | 2 | 0 | 3 | 1 |
| 6 | DF | (England) ENG | Kerys Harrop (captain) | 5 | 0 | 2 | 0 | 3 | 0 |
| 13 | DF | (Germany) GER | Marisa Ewers | 4 | 1 | 0+1 | 0 | 2+1 | 1 |
| 19 | DF | (England) ENG | Emily Westwood (vice-captain) | 5 | 1 | 2 | 1 | 1+2 | 0 |
| 25 | DF | (England) ENG | Aoife Mannion | 5 | 0 | 1+1 | 0 | 3 | 0 |
Midfielders:
| 8 | MF | (England) ENG | Sarah Mayling | 4 | 0 | 0+1 | 0 | 3 | 0 |
| 11 | MF | (Norway) NOR | Andrine Hegerberg | 2 | 0 | 2 | 0 | 0 | 0 |
| 12 | MF | (England) ENG | Abbey-Leigh Stringer | 5 | 0 | 2 | 0 | 2+1 | 0 |
| 16 | MF | (England) ENG | Chloe Peplow | 2 | 0 | 1 | 0 | 1 | 0 |
| 23 | MF | (England) ENG | Coral Haines | 1 | 0 | 1 | 0 | 0 | 0 |
Forwards:
| 7 | FW | (England) ENG | Freda Ayisi | 4 | 0 | 0+1 | 0 | 3 | 0 |
| 9 | FW | (England) ENG | Ellen White | 5 | 1 | 2 | 0 | 3 | 1 |
| 15 | FW | (England) ENG | Charlie Wellings | 3 | 0 | 1+1 | 0 | 0+1 | 0 |
| 27 | FW | (England) ENG | Ellie Brazil | 4 | 0 | 1 | 0 | 1+2 | 0 |

- Source: BCLFC

== Honours ==
- 2016–17 PFA Players' Player of the Year: (England) Ellen White (finalist)
- 2016–17 PFA Young Player of the Year: (England) Jess Carter (winner)
- 2016–17 PFA Team of the Year: (England) Jess Carter
