= 2017 Arsenal L.F.C. season =

English women's football club season

Arsenal Ladies
2016–17 season
- Chairman: Sir Chips Keswick
- Manager: Pedro Martínez Losa
- Stadium: Meadow Park (FA Cup); The Hive (WSL)
- WSL 1: Third
- FA Cup: Sixth round
- Top goalscorer: League: Danielle Carter (4); All: Danielle Carter (6)
- Biggest win: 10–0 (vs Tottenham Hotspur (H), FA Cup, 19 March 2017)
- Biggest defeat: 0–1 (vs Birmingham City (A), FA Cup, 26 March 2017)
Home colours	Away colours	Third colours

The 2017 season was Arsenal Ladies' 7th season in the Women's Super League, 25th season in the top flight, and the 30th season overall. The club participated in the WSL and the FA Cup.

The 2017 WSL season covered only half of a normal season's length, following a reorganisation of top-level women's football in England to shift its schedule to a traditional autumn-to-spring calendar. For this reason there was no WSL Cup, Champions League qualification, or relegation to be competed for.

This was the club's final season known as Arsenal Ladies before rebranding to Arsenal Women in July 2017.

== Review ==
=== Pre-season ===
Before December, Arsenal acquired midfielder Kim Little from Seattle Reign. In January, Arsenal signed midfielder Heather O'Reilly from FC Kansas City, and Beth Mead from Sunderland. In February, Arsenal signed goalkeeper Anna Moorhouse, from recently relegated Doncaster Rovers Belles.

It was also the end of an era at Arsenal, as both Rachel Yankey and Kelly Smith announced their retirement, whilst Emma Byrne ended a 17-year spell between the goalposts to play in the WSL 2 for Brighton & Hove Albion. Veteran defender Casey Stoney left to play for Liverpool, whilst Josephine Henning returned to Lyon after one season at the club. Also departing after one season was Asisat Oshoala, who moved to China to play for Dalian Quanjian.

Arsenal played a pre-season friendly against Bayern Munich in Andalusia, which they lost 3-1. There was also a testimonial to honour the retirement of Kelly Smith, held at Meadow Park.

=== March ===
Arsenal's season began with two FA Cup ties. Firstly, they hosted Tottenham Hotspur at Meadow Park, which they won 10-0. Daniëlle van de Donk scored a hat-trick, Danielle Carter netted a brace, Dominique Janssen and Chloe Kelly both got on the scoresheet, Kim Little scored on her return, and there were first Arsenal goals for Beth Mead and Katie McCabe.

Arsenal were drawn away at Birmingham City in the quarter-finals. The goals that they had found so easy to come by in the previous round deserted them here, and Marisa Ewers's second half strike proved to be sufficient for the Blues to progress.

=== April ===
Arsenal were intending to play against Notts County in their opening game to the Spring Series. However, this game was cancelled after Notts County collapsed two days before the new season kicked off. Instead, Arsenal's season began a week later, away at Sunderland, where they played out a 0–0 draw.

=== May ===
Following the demise of Notts County, Arsenal signed Louise Quinn, although bizarrely, she made her debut for the club against Sunderland before being officially announced by the club. At The Hive, their home ground for the Spring Series, they played Liverpool in a thrilling 4–4 draw. Liverpool took the lead when Alex Greenwood scored an 'Olimpico' direct from a corner, only for Chloe Kelly to bundle in an equaliser. The Reds moved back ahead when Sari van Veenendaal's clearance ricocheted off Natasha Harding and into the net, and then seconds later, Caroline Weir made it 3–1 with a glancing header. In the second half, Arsenal roared back, thanks to a brace from Carter. With ten minutes to play, a stinging drive from range by Jordan Nobbs looked to have completed the comeback, only for Gemma Bonner's header from Greenwood's corner three minutes later to pull Liverpool level and ensure a share of the points.

Arsenal's first win in the Spring Series came when they travelled to Wordsworth Drive to play Yeovil Town. Jodie Taylor's early penalty was swiftly followed by an unfortunate own goal by Molly Clarke. Another from Taylor and a header from Carter made it 4-0 after just over 30 minutes. Yeovil Town were able to pull a goal back through Lucy Quinn after a defensive error by Alex Scott, but Heather O'Reilly's penalty in the second half concluded a comprehensive 5-1 win and moved the Gunners up the third in the table.

Ten days later and Arsenal were on the road again, this time to Wheatsheaf Park for a London Derby with Chelsea. With Arsenal only a point behind their London rivals, a win would allow them to move up to second and close in on league leaders Liverpool. And they made the perfect start when an error from Carly Telford led to her bringing down Carter in the penalty area. Taylor saw her penalty saved, but was able to convert the rebound. In the second half, Chelsea responded through Millie Bright's crashing header, and in injury time, Drew Spence looked to have won it for the Blues. However, there was to be a late twist, as in the sixth added minute, Carter's strike was flicked on by Nobbs and past the helpless Telford to tie the game at 2-2.

Back at home, Arsenal faced Birmingham City, and made a disastrous start when Rachel Williams thumped a header past Anna Moorhouse within the first minute. Both sides hit the crossbar through Emily Westwood and Fara Williams, but it was Arsenal who were able to find the next goal through Heather O'Reilly just before halftime, racing onto Daniëlle van de Donk's pass and placing it past Sophie Baggaley.

The second half saw Arsenal take the lead through Van de Donk, rounding Baggaley and slotting it into the net. The lead did not last however, as Birmingham City responded within minutes through another Rachel Williams header. Twenty minutes later, another header was scored, but this time, it was Arsenal who scored it, Louise Quinn with her first goal for the club. And it was Quinn who made the game safe in injury time, heading in Nobbs' corner.

Arsenal's win had briefly moved them up to second place, but wins for Chelsea and Manchester City in the following days saw them fall behind. Their title hopes spiralled further when Kim Little suffered an anterior cruciate ligament injury in training, ruling her out for a year. By the time they arrived at the Academy Stadium to face Manchester City, they had slipped to fourth place. Both sides came into the match unbeaten, but it was Arsenal were left triumphant, winning 1-0 thanks to an incredible free kick from Jordan Nobbs' late in the second half.

Arsenal's win saw them close the gap on Chelsea and Manchester City to just one point. A win over Reading, thanks to Carter's first half goal, saw them move up to third place going into the final round of fixtures.

=== June ===
Arsenal ended their Spring Series with a trip to Bristol City. It was a routine win for the Gunners, with Quinn's first half header setting the tone. In the second half, Nobbs, Kelly and Van de Donk all got on the scoresheet, and the rout was rounded off with a first WSL goal in Arsenal colours for Beth Mead. Despite the comprehensive win, it would prove to be in vain, as Chelsea's win over Birmingham City and Manchester City's 3-1 victory over Liverpool meant the Gunners, despite going the season unbeaten, finished in third place once again. just one point off first place.

== Squad information & statistics ==
=== First team squad ===
Last updated on 2 May 2017

No.	Name	Date of Birth (Age)	Since	Last Contract	Signed From
Goalkeepers
1	(Netherlands) Sari van Veenendaal	3 April 1990 (aged 27)	2015	April 2016	(Netherlands) FC Twente
13	(England) Anna Moorhouse	30 March 1995 (aged 22)	2017	February 2017	(England) Doncaster Rovers Belles
27	(England) Sian Rogers	28 June 1998 (aged 19)	2015		(England) Birmingham City
Defenders
2	(England) Alex Scott (c)	10 June 1984 (aged 33)	2012	January 2014	(United States) Boston Breakers
3	(Scotland) Emma Mitchell	19 September 1992 (aged 25)	2013	August 2015	(Germany) SGS Essen
12	(Jamaica) Vyan Sampson	2 July 1996 (aged 21)	2014	January 2016	(England) Arsenal Academy
16	(Republic of Ireland) Louise Quinn	17 June 1990 (aged 27)	2017	May 2017	(England) Notts County
19	(England) Jemma Rose	19 January 1992 (aged 25)	2014	December 2015	(England) Bristol Academy
24	(England) Lotte Wubben-Moy	11 January 1999 (aged 18)	2015		(England) Arsenal Academy
32	(England) Anna Patten	20 April 1999 (aged 18)	2017		(England) Arsenal Academy
34	(Jamaica) Taylor Hinds	25 April 1999 (aged 18)	2016		(England) Arsenal Academy
Midfielders
4	(England) Fara Williams	25 January 1984 (aged 33)	2016	January 2016	(England) Liverpool
6	(England) Leah Williamson	29 March 1997 (aged 20)	2014	July 2015	(England) Arsenal Academy
8	(England) Jordan Nobbs	8 December 1992 (aged 24)	2010	February 2016	(England) Sunderland
10	(Scotland) Kim Little	29 June 1990 (aged 27)	2016	October 2016	(United States) Seattle Reign
11	(England) Carla Humphrey	15 December 1996 (aged 20)	2014	February 2015	(England) Arsenal Academy
17	(United States) Heather O'Reilly	2 January 1985 (aged 32)	2017	January 2017	(United States) Kansas City
20	(Netherlands) Dominique Janssen	17 January 1995 (aged 22)	2015	April 2016	(Germany) SGS Essen
21	(Netherlands) Daniëlle van de Donk	5 August 1991 (aged 26)	2015	October 2016	(Sweden) Kopparbergs/Göteborg FC
Forwards
7	(England) Chloe Kelly	15 January 1998 (aged 19)	2015	February 2016	(England) Arsenal Academy
9	(England) Danielle Carter	18 May 1993 (aged 24)	2009	January 2016	(England) Arsenal Academy
14	(England) Jodie Taylor	17 May 1986 (aged 31)	2016	March 2016	(United States) Portland Thorns
15	(Republic of Ireland) Katie McCabe	21 September 1995 (aged 22)	2015	December 2015	(Republic of Ireland) Shelbourne
23	(England) Beth Mead	9 May 1995 (aged 22)	2017	January 2017	(England) Sunderland

=== Appearances and goals ===
No.	Name	WSL 1		FA Cup		Total	
No.	Name	Apps	Goals	Apps	Goals	Apps	Goals
Goalkeepers
1	(Netherlands) Sari van Veenendaal	7	0	2	0	9	0
13	(England) Anna Moorhouse	1	0	0	0	1	0
27	(England) Sian Rogers	0	0	0	0	0	0
Defenders
2	(England) Alex Scott (c)	6	0	0	0	6	0
3	(Scotland) Emma Mitchell	0	0	0	0	0	0
12	(England) Vyan Sampson	0	0	0	0	0	0
16	(Republic of Ireland) Louise Quinn	3+2	0	0	0	3+2	3
19	(England) Jemma Rose	0	0	0	0	0	0
24	(England) Lotte Wubben-Moy	8	0	0	0	8	0
32	(England) Anna Patten	8	0	0+1	0	8+1	0
34	(Jamaica) Taylor Hinds	0	0	0	0	0	0
Midfielders
4	(England) Fara Williams	3+4	0	2	0	5+4	0
6	(England) Leah Williamson	7	0	2	0	9	0
8	(England) Jordan Nobbs	8	4	2	0	10	4
10	(Scotland) Kim Little	0	0	2	1	2	1
11	(England) Carla Humphrey	0+2	0	0	0	0+2	0
17	(United States) Heather O'Reilly	7+1	2	2	0	9+1	0
20	(Netherlands) Dominique Janssen	7	0	2	0	9	1
21	(Netherlands) Daniëlle van de Donk	7+1	2	2	3	9+1	5
Forwards
7	(England) Chloe Kelly	2+5	2	0+2	1	2+7	3
9	(England) Dan Carter	7	4	2	2	9	6
14	(England) Jodie Taylor	4+3	3	2	0	6+3	3
15	(Republic of Ireland) Katie McCabe	0+3	0	2	1	2+3	1
23	(England) Beth Mead	3+2	1	0+1	1	3+3	2

=== Goalscorers ===
Rank	No.	Pos.	Player	WSL 1	FA Cup	Total
1	9	FW	(England) Danielle Carter	4	2	6
2	21	MF	(Netherlands) Daniëlle van de Donk	2	3	5
3	8	MF	(England) Jordan Nobbs	4	0	4
4	14	FW	(England) Jodie Taylor	3	0	3
4	16	DF	(Republic of Ireland) Louise Quinn	3	0	3
4	7	FW	(England) Chloe Kelly	2	1	3
7	17	MF	(United States) Heather O'Reilly	2	0	2
7	23	FW	(England) Beth Mead	1	1	2
9	10	MF	(Scotland) Kim Little	0	1	1
9	15	FW	(Republic of Ireland) Katie McCabe	0	1	1
9	20	MF	(Netherlands) Dominique Janssen	0	1	1
Own goal				1	0	1
Total				22	10	32

=== Disciplinary record ===
Rank	No.	Position	Name	WSL 1		FA Cup		Total	
Rank	No.	Position	Name	Yellow card	Red card	Yellow card	Red card	Yellow card	Red card
1	20	MF	(Netherlands) Dominique Janssen	2	0	0	0	2	0
2	24	DF	(England) Lotte Wubben-Moy	1	0	0	0	1	0
2	27	MF	(United States) Heather O'Reilly	1	0	0	0	1	0
Total				4	0	0	0	4	0

=== Clean sheets ===
Rank	No.	Pos.	No.	Player	WSL 1	FA Cup	Total
1	1	GK	1	(Netherlands) Sari van Veenendaal	4	1	5
Total					4	1	5

== Transfers, loans and other signings ==
=== Transfers in ===
Announcement date	No.	Position	Player	From club
17 October 2016	10	MF	(Scotland) Kim Little	(United States) Seattle Reign FC
18 January 2017	17	MF	(United States) Heather O'Reilly	(United States) FC Kansas City
24 January 2017	23	FW	(England) Beth Mead	(England) Sunderland
17 February 2017	13	GK	(England) Anna Moorhouse	(England) Doncaster
3 May 2017 (Note: Made her debut on 30 April 2017 prior to the official announcement.)	16	DF	(Republic of Ireland) Louise Quinn	(England) Notts County

=== Transfers out ===
Announcement date	No.	Position	Player	To club
9 November 2016	5	DF	(England) Casey Stoney	(England) Liverpool
15 December 2016	22	DF	(Germany) Josephine Henning	(France) Lyon
30 December 2016	11	FW	(England) Rachel Yankey	Retired
30 December 2016	1	GK	(Republic of Ireland) Emma Byrne	(England) Brighton & Hove Albion
11 January 2017	10	FW	(England) Kelly Smith	Retired
15 February 2017	24	FW	(Nigeria) Asisat Oshoala	(China) Dalian Quanjian
March 2017	29	DF	(England) Chiara Ritchie-Williams	(United States) LSU Lady Tigers
July 2017	30	MF	(England) Georgia Allen	(United States) Syracuse Orange

=== Loans out ===
Announcement date	No.	Position	Player	To club
31 March 2017	28	MF	(England) Charlie Devlin	(England) Millwall Lionesses

== Club ==
=== Kit (2016-17) ===
Supplier: Puma / Sponsor: Fly Emirates

Home	Away

=== Kit information ===
This is third consecutive season Puma has supplied Arsenal with kits.

- Home: The home kit features Arsenal's traditional colours of red and white, with the addition of a dark trim around the lowered neck line, on the sleeve (hooped) and along the red stripe on the shorts. The distinguishing feature of the kit is the darkened, vertical, red stripe across the centre of the kit. It also features predominantly red socks for the first time since the 2004–05 season (as opposed to only featuring on the alternate kits).
- Away: The away kit is predominantly yellow following the trend of recent Arsenal away kits. The contrasting colour is "gunmetal grey" which appears on the collar (alongside a thin, centred, yellow line), as a trim on the v-shaped neck line and on the sleeve, separated by a large yellow strip across the shoulders and multiple hooped yellow lines across the bottom section of the sleeve. The shorts are predominantly gunmetal grey, with a yellow trim along the sides. The socks are yellow with multiple gunmetal grey hooped lines on the upper section.
- Third: The third kit is an abstraction from previous alternate kits for Arsenal as it predominantly features a single colour of dark blue. A vibrant neon yellow forms the detail across a wide strip on the shoulder and on the cuffs of the sleeves. The shorts are also dark blue with neon yellow detail along the sides and the kit is completed with single-colour neon yellow socks with a single dark blue hoop on the upper section.

==== Kit usage (2016-17) ====
Kit	Combination	Usage	
Home	Red body; White sleeves; White shorts; Red socks	WSL	Liverpool (H); Yeovil Town (A); Chelsea (A); Birmingham City (H); Manchester City (A); Reading (H)
Home	Red body; White sleeves; White shorts; Red socks	FA Cup	Tottenham Hotspur (H); Birmingham City (A)
Away	Yellow body; Grey sleeves; Grey shorts; Yellow socks	WSL	Sunderland (A); Bristol City (A)

== Non-competitive ==
=== Pre-season friendly ===
1 February 2017 Friendly	Arsenal (England)	1–3	(Germany) Bayern Munich	Seville, Spain
15:00	Carter 63'	Report	Miedema 18'; Bürki 81', 88'	Stadium: CD Luis del Sol

=== Testimonials ===
19 February 2017 Kelly Smith	Arsenal	4–2	All-Stars	Borehamwood
	Little; Carter; Nobbs; Dean	Report	Houghton; Smith (pen.)	Stadium: Meadow Park; Referee: Howard Webb

== Competitions ==
=== Overall record ===
Competition	First match	Last match	Starting round	Final position	Record							
Competition	First match	Last match	Starting round	Final position	Pld	W	D	L	GF	GA	GD	Win %
FA WSL 1	30 April 2017	3 June 2017	Matchday 1	3rd	8	5	3	0	22	9	+13	62.50
FA Women's Cup	19 March 2017	26 March 2017	Fifth round	Quarter-finals	2	1	0	1	10	1	+9	50.00
Total					10	6	3	1	32	10	+22	60.00

Source: FA WSL

=== League table ===
Pos	Team	Pld	W	D	L	GF	GA	GD	Pts
1	Chelsea (C)	8	6	1	1	32	3	+29	19
2	Manchester City	8	6	1	1	17	6	+11	19
3	Arsenal	8	5	3	0	22	9	+13	18
4	Liverpool	8	4	2	2	20	18	+2	14
5	Sunderland	8	2	3	3	4	14	−10	9

Source: FA WSL
Rules for classification: 1) Points; 2) Goal difference; 3) Number of goals scored
(C) Champions

==== Results summary ====
Overall								Home						Away					
Pld	W	D	L	GF	GA	GD	Pts	W	D	L	GF	GA	GD	W	D	L	GF	GA	GD
8	5	3	0	22	9	+13	18	2	1	0	9	6	+3	3	2	0	13	3	+10

Last updated: 3 June 2017.
Source: FA WSL

==== Results by matchday ====
Matchday	1	2	3	4	5	6	7	8
Ground	A	H	A	A	H	A	H	A
Result	D	D	W	D	W	W	W	W
Position	5	5	3	4	2	4	3	3

Updated to match(es) played on 3 June 2017. Source: FA WSL
A = Away; H = Home; W = Win; D = Draw; L = Loss

==== Matches ====
30 April 2017 1	Sunderland	0–0	Arsenal	Hetton le Hole
14:00 BST	Holmes (yellow card) 31'	Report		Stadium: Hetton Centre; Attendance: 577; Referee: Rebecca Welch

4 May 2017 2	Arsenal	4–4	Liverpool	Canons Park
19:30 BST	Kelly 36'; Carter 53', 59'; Nobbs 80'	Report	Greenwood 13'; Harding 41'; Weir 44'; Bonner 83'	Stadium: The Hive; Attendance: 696; Referee: David Rock

7 May 2017 3	Yeovil Town	1–5	Arsenal	Taunton
14:00 BST	Quinn 42'	Report	Taylor 7' (pen.), 24'; Clarke 9' (o.g.); Carter 31'; O'Reilly 53' (pen.)	Stadium: Viridor Stadium; Attendance: 824; Referee: Scott Jackson

17 May 2017 4	Chelsea	2–2	Arsenal	Staines
19:30 BST	Chapman (yellow card) 39'; Bright 69'; Davison (yellow card) 88'; Spence 90+2'	Report	O'Reilly (yellow card) 30'; Taylor (penalty missed) 34' 34'; Janssen (yellow card) 68'; Nobbs 90+6'	Stadium: Wheatsheaf Park; Attendance: 1,009; Referee: Aji Ajibola

20 May 2017 5	Arsenal	4–2	Birmingham City	Canons Park
13:00 BST	O'Reilly 44'; Van de Donk 55'; Carter (yellow card) 78'; Quinn 78', 90+1'	Report	Williams 1', 58'	Stadium: The Hive; Attendance: 1,070; Referee: Neil Morrison

28 May 2017 6	Manchester City	0–1	Arsenal	Manchester
12:30 BST		Report	Janssen (yellow card) 67'; Nobbs 75'	Stadium: Academy Stadium; Attendance: 1,808; Referee: Anthony Tankard

31 May 2017 7	Arsenal	1–0	Reading	Canons Park
19:30 BST	Carter 40'	Report	McGee (yellow card) 37'; H. Scott (yellow card) 60'	Stadium: The Hive; Attendance: 870; Referee: Alan Dale

3 June 2017 8	Bristol City	0–5	Arsenal	Stoke Gifford
18:00 BST	Allen (yellow card) 63'	Report	Wubben-Moy (yellow card) 9'; Quinn 27'; Nobbs 52'; Kelly 76'; Van de Donk 81'; Mead 86'	Stadium: Stoke Gifford Stadium; Attendance: 1,050; Referee: Sam Allison

=== FA Cup ===
19 March 2017 Fifth round	Arsenal	10–0	Tottenham Hotspur	Borehamwood
14:00 GMT	Carter 22', 30'; Janssen 29'; Little 38'; Van de Donk 43', 59', 84'; Kelly 65'; Mead 69'; McCabe 77'	Report		Stadium: Meadow Park; Attendance: 1,407; Referee: Jason Richardson

26 March 2017 Quarter-finals	Birmingham City	1–0	Arsenal	Solihull
14:00 BST	Ewers 77'; White (yellow card) 82'	Report		Stadium: Damson Park; Attendance: 514; Referee: Ian Rathbone

== Honours ==
- PFA Special Achievement Award: (England) Kelly Smith
- 2016–17 PFA Team of the Year: (England) Jordan Nobbs

== See also ==
- List of Arsenal W.F.C. seasons
- 2016–17 in English football
