= Elisha N'Dow =

English footballer (born 1996)

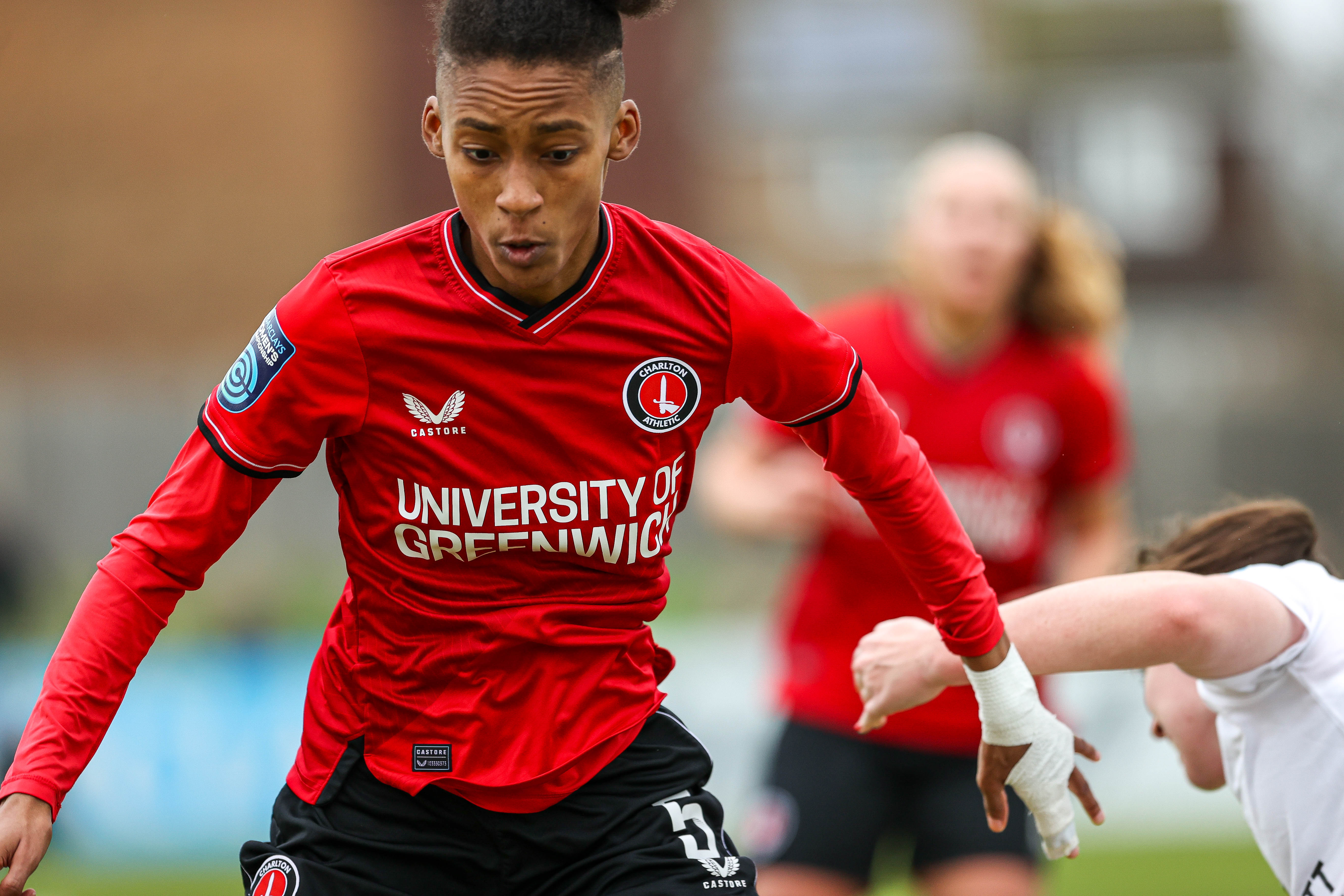
- N'Dow with Charlton Athletic in 2022.

Personal information
- Date of birth: 13 October 1996 (age 30)
- Place of birth: England
- Height: 1.78 m (5 ft 10 in)
- Position: Centre back

Team information
- Current team: Charlton Athletic
- Number: 5

Youth career
- –2014: Aston Villa

Senior career*
Years	Team	Apps	(Gls)
2014–2023	Aston Villa	79	(2)
2022	→ Coventry United (loan)	9	(0)
2022–2023	→ Charlton Athletic (loan)	20	(1)
2023–	Charlton Athletic	58	(1)

International career^{‡}
2012–2013	England U17	1	(0)
2014–2015	England U19	1	(0)
- * Club domestic league appearances and goals as of 02:14, 6 April 2026 (UTC) ‡ National team caps and goals as of 18:03, 15 December 2020 (UTC)

Elisha N'Dow (born 13 October 1996) is an English professional footballer who plays as a centre back for Women's Super League club Charlton Athletic. She has represented Aston Villa on more than 150 occasions and served as their captain.

== Club career ==
N'Dow first joined Aston Villa as a youth player and progressed into the senior team, making over 150 appearances for the club. She played in all 14 of the club's league matches in the 2019–20 FA Women's Championship, which saw Aston Villa promoted to the WSL.

Having played for Aston Villa for several years, N'Dow joined Coventry United on loan for the second half of the 2022–23 season. The following season, she joined Charlton Athletic on loan before signing a permanent contract with the club in 2023. In July 2025, N'Dow signed a contract extension with Charlton.

== Career statistics ==
=== Club ===
As of match played 5 April 2026

Appearances and goals by club, season and competition
Club	Season	League			FA Cup		League Cup (Note: includes Women's League Cup)		Total	
Club	Season	Division	Apps	Goals	Apps	Goals	Apps	Goals	Apps	Goals
Aston Villa	2017–18	Women's Super League 2	18	2	0	0	4	0	22	2
Aston Villa	2018–19	Women's Championship	20	0	0	0	4	0	24	0
Aston Villa	2019–20	Women's Championship	14	0	0	0	4	0	18	0
Aston Villa	2020–21	Women's Super League	20	0	0	0	4	0	24	0
Aston Villa	2021–22	Women's Super League	7	0	0	0	3	0	10	0
Aston Villa	Total		79	2	0	0	19	0	98	2
Coventry United (loan)	2021–22	Women's Championship	9	0	3	0	0	0	12	0
Charlton Athletic (loan)	2022–23	Women's Championship	20	1	2	0	2	0	24	1
Charlton Athletic	2023–24	Women's Championship	18	1	2	1	2	0	22	2
Charlton Athletic	2024–25	Women's Championship	20	1	1	0	3	0	24	1
Charlton Athletic	2025–26	Women's Super League 2	20	0	2	0	0	0	22	0
Charlton Athletic	Total		58	2	5	1	5	0	68	3
Career total			166	5	10	1	26	0	202	6
