= Emily Syme =

English association football player (born 2000)

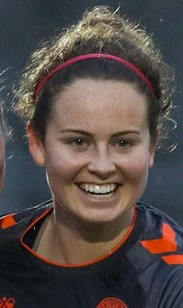
- Syme with Bristol City in 2022.

Personal information
- Full name: Emily Syme
- Date of birth: 23 July 2000 (age 26)
- Place of birth: Grimsby, North East Lincolnshire, England
- Position: Midfielder

Team information
- Current team: Bristol City
- Number: 16

Youth career
- Bristol City

Senior career*
Years	Team	Apps	(Gls)
2017	Bristol City	1	(0)
2018–2019	Yeovil Town	15	(1)
2019–2022	Aston Villa	29	(1)
2021–2022	→ Sheffield United (loan)	5	(0)
2022–	Bristol City	59	(6)

International career^{‡}
2017	England U17	3	(3)
2019	England U19	7	(4)
2019	England U21	2	(0)
- * Club domestic league appearances and goals as of 24 March 2024 ‡ National team caps and goals as of 00:15, 26 March 2023 (UTC)

Emily Syme (born 23 July 2000) is an English professional footballer who plays as a midfielder for Women's Super League 2 club Bristol City.

== Career ==
Having previously played for Bristol City, Syme signed her first professional contract with Yeovil Town in 2018, before joining Aston Villa in July 2019.

On 26 January 2022, Aston Villa announced that Syme had left the club by mutual consent.

Syme signed for Bristol City in 2022, and was part of the team which won promotion to the Women's Super League in the 2022-23 season. She was named as the Women’s Championship Player of the Month for December 2024. On 9 July 2025, it was announced that Syme had signed a one-year contract extension with the club, having been named the club's 2024/25 Players’ Player of the Year. On 18 January 2026, she scored both goals for Bristol in a 2–1 win over Southampton, helping Bristol to reach the fifth round of the FA Cup.

She has played for England at under-17, under-19 and under-21 levels.

== Career statistics ==
=== Club ===
As of match played 24 March 2024

Appearances and goals by club, season and competition
Club	Season	League			FA Cup		League Cup		Total	
Club	Season	Division	Apps	Goals	Apps	Goals	Apps	Goals	Apps	Goals
Bristol City	2017	Women's Super League	1	0	0	0	0	0	1	0
Bristol City	Total		1	0	0	0	0	0	1	0
Yeovil Town	2018–19	Women's Super League	15	1	1	0	3	1	19	2
Yeovil Town	Total		15	1	1	0	3	1	19	2
Aston Villa	2019–20	Championship	14	1	0	0	5	2	19	3
Aston Villa	2020–21	Women's Super League	15	0	1	0	4	1	20	1
Aston Villa	Total		29	1	1	0	9	3	39	4
Sheffield United (loan)	2021–22	Championship	5	0	0	0	0	0	5	0
Sheffield United (loan)	Total		5	0	0	0	0	0	5	8
Bristol City	2022–23		22	3	3	1	4	1	28	5
Bristol City	2023–24	Women's Super League	17	0	1	0	4	0	22	0
Bristol City	2024-25	Championship	20	3	1	0	3	0	24	3
Bristol City	2025-26	Championship	9	1	0	0	3	0	12	1
Bristol City	Total		59	6	4	1	11	2	86	9
Career total			108	6	6	1	26	6	150	15

== Honours ==
Bristol City

- FA Women's Championship: 2022-23

Aston Villa

- FA Women's Championship: 2019-20
