= Sophie Maierhofer =

Austrian footballer (born 1996)

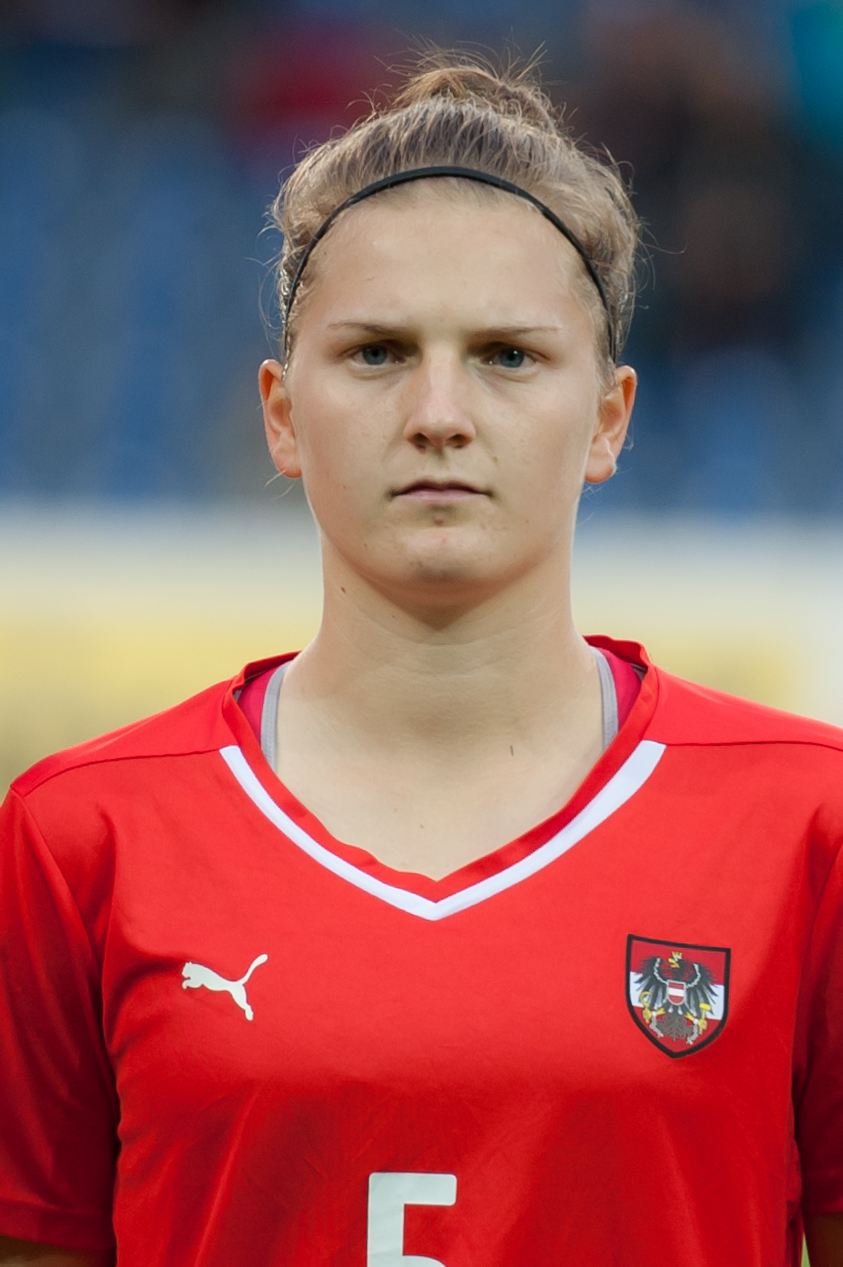
- Maierhofer in 2015

Personal information
- Date of birth: 9 August 1996 (age 30)
- Place of birth: Graz, Austria
- Height: 1.70 m (5 ft 7 in)
- Position: Right-back

Team information
- Current team: Sturm Graz
- Number: 15

College career
Years	Team	Apps	(Gls)
2016–2019	Kansas Jayhawks	61	(7)

Senior career*
Years	Team	Apps	(Gls)
2015–2016	Werder Bremen	9	(0)
2018	UMF Selfoss	5	(1)
2020	Aston Villa	1	(0)
2020–2021	MSV Duisburg	12	(0)
2021–	Sturm Graz	16	(2)

International career
2015–	Austria		
- * Club domestic league appearances and goals as of 1 July 2022

Sophie Maierhofer (born 9 August 1996) is an Austrian footballer who plays as a right-back for ÖFB-Frauenliga club Sturm Graz and the Austria national team.

She was on the Austria squad at UEFA Women's Euro 2017.
