= Natalie Haigh =

English association football player

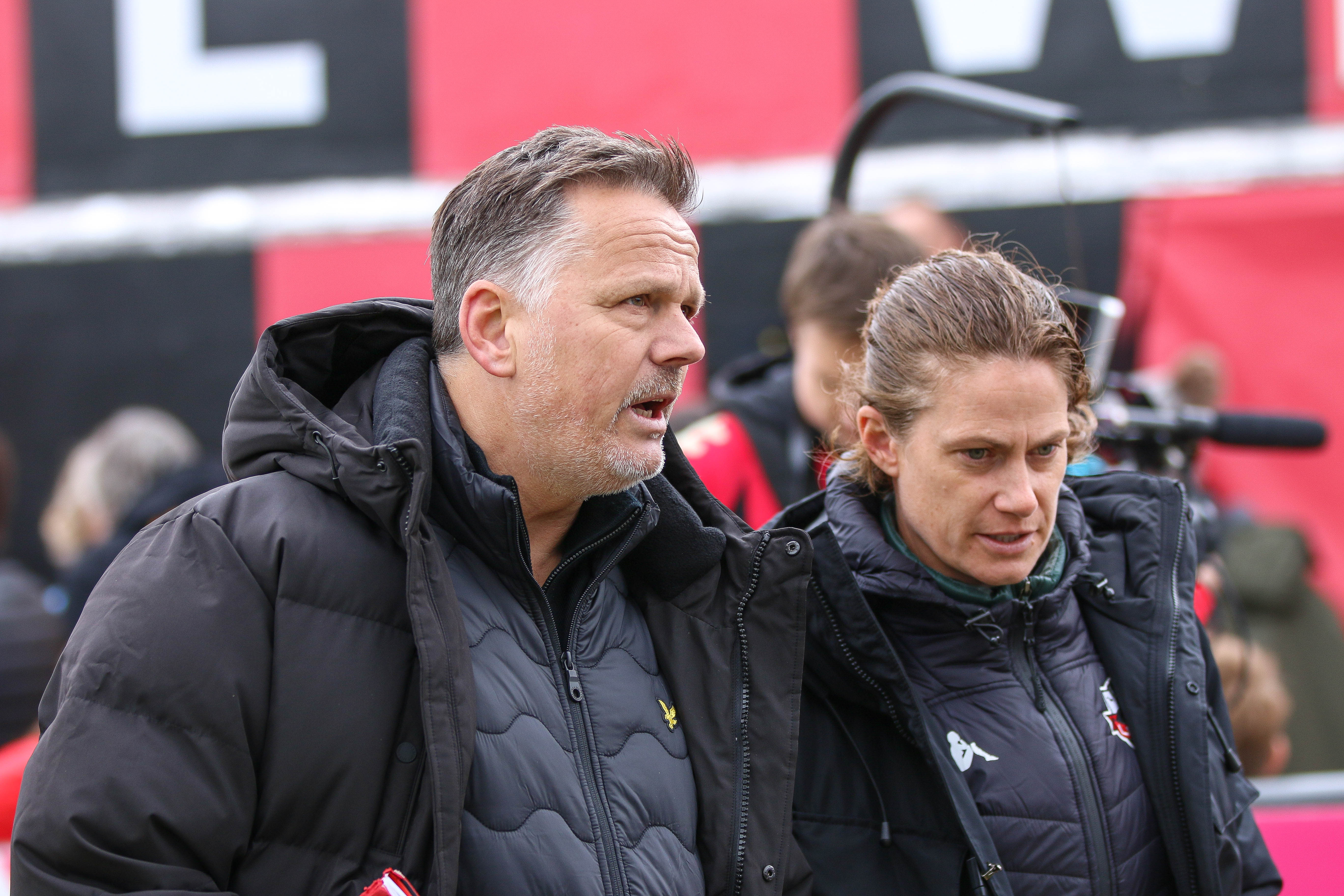
- Haigh (right) with Scott Booth as coaching team for Lewes F.C. Women in 2023

Personal information
- Full name: Natalie Elizabeth Haigh
- Date of birth: 8 February 1989 (age 37)
- Place of birth: Reading, England
- Height: 5 ft 10 in (1.78 m)
- Position: Defender

Youth career
- Wetherby Athletic
- Leeds United

College career
Years	Team	Apps	(Gls)
2007	Cal State Bakersfield Roadrunners		

Senior career*
Years	Team	Apps	(Gls)
2005–2009	Leeds United		
2009–2011	Leeds City Vixens		
2012–2013	Swindon Spitfires		
2013–2015	Yeovil Town		
2015	Larkhall Athletic		
2016	Swindon Town		
2017	Yeovil Town	6	(0)
2017–2018	Coventry United		
2018	→ Nordsjælland (Loan)		
2019–2022	Aston Villa	33	(2)
2022	→ Coventry United (loan)	8	(0)
- * Club domestic league appearances and goals as of 03:15, 20 December 2020 (UTC)

Natalie Elizabeth Haigh (born 8 February 1989) is an English professional footballer who plays as a defender. She has previously played for Yeovil Town, Coventry United, Nordsjælland and Aston Villa. In 2022 to May 2023 she was assistant manager at Lewes FC Women.

== Early life ==
Haigh was born in Reading, but grew up in Wetherby and attended Boston Spa Sports College. She began playing football at nine years old and her first club was Wetherby Athletic.

== Club career ==
=== Leeds United ===
In August 2005, 16-year-old Haigh made her FA Women's Premier League National Division debut for Leeds United as a substitute in a 4–3 defeat at Arsenal. In May 2006 she started in Leeds's 5–0 FA Women's Cup final defeat by Arsenal. She joined Leeds City Vixens in 2009.

=== Yeovil ===
Haigh rejoined Yeovil Town in February 2017 after previously being captain of the team. Haigh made six appearances that season and saw this as a great achievement after having recovered from a back injury received in 2015.

=== Aston Villa ===
On 21 July 2019, Haigh joined Aston Villa alongside Shania Hayles and Charlotte Greengrass who signed on the same day. She made her debut on 18 August in a 3–2 home win over Sheffield United in the Women's Championship.

== Lewes ==
In 2022 she took a position of assistant manager to Scott Booth at Lewes FC Women. She left in May 2023.

== International career ==
At the 2011 Summer Universiade in Shenzhen, China, Haigh represented the Great Britain Universities team.

== Personal life ==
Haigh relocated to Gloucestershire to study at the University of Gloucestershire. Before turning professional with Aston Villa, she ran the women's football and futsal teams at Hartpury College.
