= Meaghan Sargeant =

English footballer

Personal information
- Full name: Meaghan Sargeant
- Date of birth: 16 March 1994 (age 32)
- Place of birth: Sheffield, England
- Height: 1.70 m (5 ft 7 in)
- Position: Defender

Youth career
- Sheffield United
- 2010–2012: Arsenal

Senior career*
Years	Team	Apps	(Gls)
2012–2013	Notts County	12	(0)
2014–2019	Birmingham City	56	(4)
2019–2021	Bristol City	15	(0)
2021–2023	Aston Villa	12	(0)
Total		95	(4)

International career
2011	England U17	9	(1)
2012	England U19	11	(0)
2017	England U23	3	(0)
- * Club domestic league appearances and goals as of 21:20, 31 May 2023 (UTC)

Meaghan Sargeant (born 16 March 1994) is an English former footballer who played as a defender for Notts County, Birmingham City, Bristol City and Aston Villa.

== Club career ==
Sargeant progressed through Sheffield United's Centre of Excellence, before joining Arsenal Ladies' Academy. In January 2012, Sargeant signed for Lincoln Ladies.

In March 2014, Sargeant joined Birmingham City. In February 2016, she signed a new contract with Birmingham City.

In May 2019, despite rumours linking her with Arsenal, Sargeant became the first summer signing for Bristol City, joining the club on a two-year deal alongside Charlie Wellings. During her second season with the club, she made only three appearances due to injury.

On 3 July 2021, Sargeant signed for Aston Villa on a two-year contract. She was their fifth signing of the summer. After making 13 appearances in her first season with the club, she suffered from a recurring back injury throughout the 2022/23 season.

On 20 June 2023, Sargeant announced that she would retire as a player at the age of 29, due to her injury, but would continue her career at Aston Villa in a non-playing role.
