= Marisa Ewers =

German football defender

Personal information
- Full name: Marisa Henrike Ewers
- Date of birth: 24 February 1989 (age 37)
- Place of birth: Hamburg, West Germany
- Height: 1.69 m (5 ft 7 in)
- Positions: Defender; midfielder

Youth career
- Blau-Weiß 96 Schenefeld
- Altona 93

Senior career*
Years	Team	Apps	(Gls)
2006–2008	Hamburger SV II	37	(1)
2008–2012	Hamburger SV	62	(2)
2012–2016	Bayer Leverkusen	84	(3)
2016–2019	Birmingham City	28	(0)
2019–2022	Aston Villa	39	(3)

International career
	Germany U20	1	(0)
	Germany U23	7	(1)
- * Club domestic league appearances and goals

Marisa Henrike Ewers is a German former footballer who played as a defender for Aston Villa, Birmingham City, Bayer Leverkusen and Hamburger SV. She is currently Director of Women's Football Aston Villa Women.

Ewers started playing football at the age of eight. In 2006, she joined Bundesliga club Hamburger SV where she first played for the reserve team in the second German division Since 2007, Ewers had been part of the Bundesliga team. However in 2012, shortly after Hamburg announced its disestablishment of the women's section, she joined Bayer 04 Leverkusen where she immediately became a regular starter. In 2008, Ewers was part of the German squad which took part at the Under-19 Championship.

Ewers moved to English football, joining Birmingham City in 2016, before leaving to join their rivals Aston Villa in the division below, helping them to secure promotion to the Women's Super League.

In February 2022, Ewers announced her retirement from playing. Having already undertook a recruitment role at Aston Villa alongside her playing days, Ewers was made Head of Recruitment at the conclusion of the 2021/22 season, and subsequently promoted to General Manager in 2023.

In January 2024, Ewers was named by Aston Villa as a member of the Honorary Anniversary Board ahead of the club's 150th anniversary season.

On 30 May 2025 Ewers was appointed Director of Women's Football at Aston Villa.

== Career statistics ==
As of 15 January 2022

Club	Season	League			FA Cup		League Cup		Continental		Total	
Club	Season	Division	Apps	Goals	Apps	Goals	Apps	Goals	Apps	Goals	Apps	Goals
Hamburger SV II	2006–08	2. Frauen-Bundesliga	37	1	0	0	0	0	0	0	37	1
Hamburger SV	2008–09	Frauen-Bundesliga	1	0	0	0	0	0	0	0	1	0
Hamburger SV	2009–10	Frauen-Bundesliga	21	0	1	0	0	0	0	0	22	0
Hamburger SV	2010–11	Frauen-Bundesliga	18	1	3	0	0	0	0	0	21	1
Hamburger SV	2011–12	Frauen-Bundesliga	22	1	4	1	5	0	0	0	31	2
Hamburger SV	Total		62	2	8	1	5	0	0	0	75	3
Bayer Leverkusen	2012–13	Frauen-Bundesliga	22	0	1	0	0	0	0	0	23	0
Bayer Leverkusen	2013–14	Frauen-Bundesliga	21	1	1	0	0	0	0	0	22	1
Bayer Leverkusen	2014–15	Frauen-Bundesliga	20	0	2	0	0	0	0	0	22	0
Bayer Leverkusen	2015–16	Frauen-Bundesliga	21	2	2	0	0	0	0	0	23	2
Bayer Leverkusen	Total		84	3	6	0	0	0	0	0	90	3
Birmingham City	2016	FA WSL	4	0	0	0	1	0	0	0	5	0
Birmingham City	2017	FA WSL Spring Series	4	0	0	0	1	0	0	0	5	0
Birmingham City	2017–18	FA WSL	12	0	0	0	1	0	0	0	13	0
Birmingham City	2018–19	FA WSL	8	0	0	0	2	0	0	0	10	0
Birmingham City	Total		28	0	0	0	5	0	0	0	36	0
Aston Villa	2019–20	Women's Championship	14	3	0	0	6	0	0	0	20	3
Aston Villa	2020–21	Women's Super League	19	0	0	0	3	0	0	0	22	0
Aston Villa	2021–22	Women's Super League	5	0	2	0	3	0	0	0	10	0
Aston Villa	Total		39	3	2	0	12	0	0	0	52	3
Career total			249	9	16	1	22	0	0	0	287	10
