= Sian Rogers =

English footballer

Personal information
- Full name: Sian Rogers
- Date of birth: 28 June 1998 (age 28)
- Place of birth: Gateshead, Tyne & Wear, England
- Position: Goalkeeper

Team information
- Current team: Sheffield United

Youth career
- –2013: Wolverhampton Wanderers
- 2013–2015: Birmingham City
- 2015–2017: Arsenal

Senior career*
Years	Team	Apps	(Gls)
2017–2023	Aston Villa	46	(0)
2022–2023	→ Charlton Athletic (loan)	22	(0)
2023–2024	Charlton Athletic	14	(0)
2024–	Sheffield United	27	(0)

International career^{‡}
2014	England U16	3	(0)
2013–2015	England U17	7	(0)
2016–2017	England U19	6	(0)
2017	England U20	1	(0)
- * Club domestic league appearances and goals as of 1 February 2026 ‡ National team caps and goals as of 26 October 2020

Sian Rogers (born 28 June 1998) is an English professional footballer who plays as a goalkeeper for Women's Super League 2 club Sheffield United.

Rogers played youth football with Wolverhampton Wanderers, Birmingham City and Arsenal before joining Aston Villa. She made her first-team debut in the 2017–18 FA WSL 2.

Rogers has played for England at several youth levels.

== Early life ==
Rogers began to play football at the age of six. She was scouted by the Wolverhampton Wanderers centre of excellence, later going on to join Birmingham City. Rogers became a regular for the development side whilst at Birmingham, before signing for Arsenal to be a key part of the successful development side there. She was occasionally an unused substitute at senior level for Birmingham and Arsenal.

== Club career ==
=== Aston Villa ===
Rogers was signed by Aston Villa in the run up to the 2017–18 season.

Rogers received her first red card in a match against Manchester United on 17 April 2019. Her strong performances in the 2018–19 season saw her nominated for the club's player of the season award.

Rogers signed a new two-year contract with Villa in October 2019. She spent a period out with a shoulder injury during this month. Rogers made her fiftieth appearance in a Villa shirt against Lewes on 24 November 2019. She was awarded the Golden Glove after keeping five clean sheets in thirteen matches as Aston Villa claimed the 2019–20 FA Women's Championship title.

Rogers made her top flight debut against Manchester City on 5 September 2020.

=== Charlton Athletic ===
Rogers joined Charlton Athletic on loan for the 2022-23 season and featured in all 22 of the club's league games, tallying 7 clean sheets. On 12 July 2023, it was announced that Rogers had signed a one-year contract with Charlton, extending her time at the club.

=== Sheffield United ===
On 20 July 2024, Rogers joined Women's Championship side Sheffield United. She was nominated for the Women's Championship Save of the Season award for the 2024-25 season. Rogers was won Sheffield's Player of the Season award for the 2024-25 season. On 3 July 2025, it was announced that Sheffield had exercised a clause in Rogers' contract to extend her time at the club.

== International career ==
Rogers was first called up to an England side at the age of 13, before going on to be a part of England U17 squad at the 2014 UEFA Women's Under-17 Championship. In April 2014, she was captain of England women's national under-16 football team for a match against Switzerland.

Rogers was also a part of the squad for the 2015 tournament in Iceland. In 2017, she was part of the England U19 squad for a tournament in La Manga.

Rogers was a part of the preliminary squad for the 2018 FIFA Under-20 Women's World Cup. She took part in an England U21 training camp in January 2019.

== Style of play ==
Rogers has been identified as a highly competent shot-stopper from a young age. She has worked on developing her kicking ability and distribution.

== Personal life ==
Rogers is a big film fan.

== Career statistics ==
=== Club ===
As of match played 1 February 2026

Appearances and goals by club, season and competition
Club	Season	League			FA Cup		League Cup		Total	
Club	Season	Division	Apps	Goals	Apps	Goals	Apps	Goals	Apps	Goals
Aston Villa	2017–18	FA WSL 2	11	0	0	0	4	0	15	0
Aston Villa	2018–19	FA Women's Championship	18	0	0	0	4	0	22	0
Aston Villa	2019–20	FA Women's Championship	13	0	0	0	3	0	16	0
Aston Villa	2020–21	FA WSL	1	0	0	0	2	0	3	0
Aston Villa	2021–22	FA WSL	3	0	0	0	4	0	7	0
Aston Villa	Total		46	0	0	0	17	0	63	0
Charlton Athletic (loan)	2022–23	Women's Championship	22	0	2	0	0	0	24	0
Charlton Athletic	2023–24	Women's Championship	14	0	0	0	1	0	15	0
Charlton Athletic	Total		36	0	2	0	1	0	39	0
Sheffield United	2024–25	Women's Championship	19	0	0	0	0	0	19	0
Sheffield United	2025–26	WSL 2	8	0	2	0	0	0	10	0
Sheffield United	Total		27	0	2	0	0	0	29	0
Career total			109	0	4	0	18	0	131	0

== Honours ==
Aston Villa

- Women's Championship: 2019–20

Individual

- FA Women's Championship Golden Glove: 2019–20
