= Sophie Haywood =

English footballer

Personal information
- Full name: Sophie Kerstan Haywood
- Date of birth: 10 January 1996 (age 30)
- Place of birth: Hull, England
- Height: 1.75 m (5 ft 9 in)
- Position: Forward

Team information
- Current team: Hull City
- Number: 17

College career
Years	Team	Apps	(Gls)
2014–2015	South Alabama Jaguars	44	(7)
2016–2017	Texas A&M–Commerce Lions	41	(14)

Senior career*
Years	Team	Apps	(Gls)
2014	Notts County	1	(0)
2018–2022	Aston Villa	40	(3)
2022–2024	Sheffield United	32	(3)
2024–2025	Newcastle United	5	(0)
2025	→ Nottingham Forest (loan)	6	(0)
2025-	Hull City	0	(0)
- * Club domestic league appearances and goals as of 16:43, 5th December 2025 (UTC)

Sophie Kerstan Haywood (born 10 January 1996) is an English professional footballer who plays as a forward for Women's National League club Hull City. She spent four years in the United States alongside her studies at South Alabama Jaguars and Texas A&M–Commerce Lions on a sporting scholarship.

== Club career ==
Haywood joined Aston Villa on 1 July 2018.

== Career statistics ==
=== Club ===
As of match played 13 October 2024

Appearances and goals by club, season and competition
Club	Season	League			National Cup (Note: includes the Women's FA Cup)		League Cup (Note: includes the Women's League Cup)		Total	
Club	Season	Division	Apps	Goals	Apps	Goals	Apps	Goals	Apps	Goals
Notts County	2014	Women's Super League	1	0	0	0	3	0	4	0
Aston Villa	2018–19	Women's Championship	19	3	0	0	3	0	22	3
Aston Villa	2019–20	Women's Championship	13	0	0	0	5	1	18	1
Aston Villa	2020–21	Women's Super League	8	0	0	0	2	0	10	0
Aston Villa	2021–22	Women's Super League	0	0	0	0	0	0	0	0
Aston Villa	Total		40	3	0	0	10	1	50	4
Sheffield United F.C.	2022–23	Women's Championship	14	3	1	0	0	0	15	3
Sheffield United F.C.	2023–24	Women's Championship	18	0	1	1	3	0	22	1
Sheffield United F.C.	Total		32	3	2	1	3	0	37	4
Newcastle United F.C.	2024–25	Women's Championship	5	0	0	0	1	0	6	0
Career total			78	6	2	1	17	1	97	8
