= Jodie Hutton =

English footballer (born 2001)

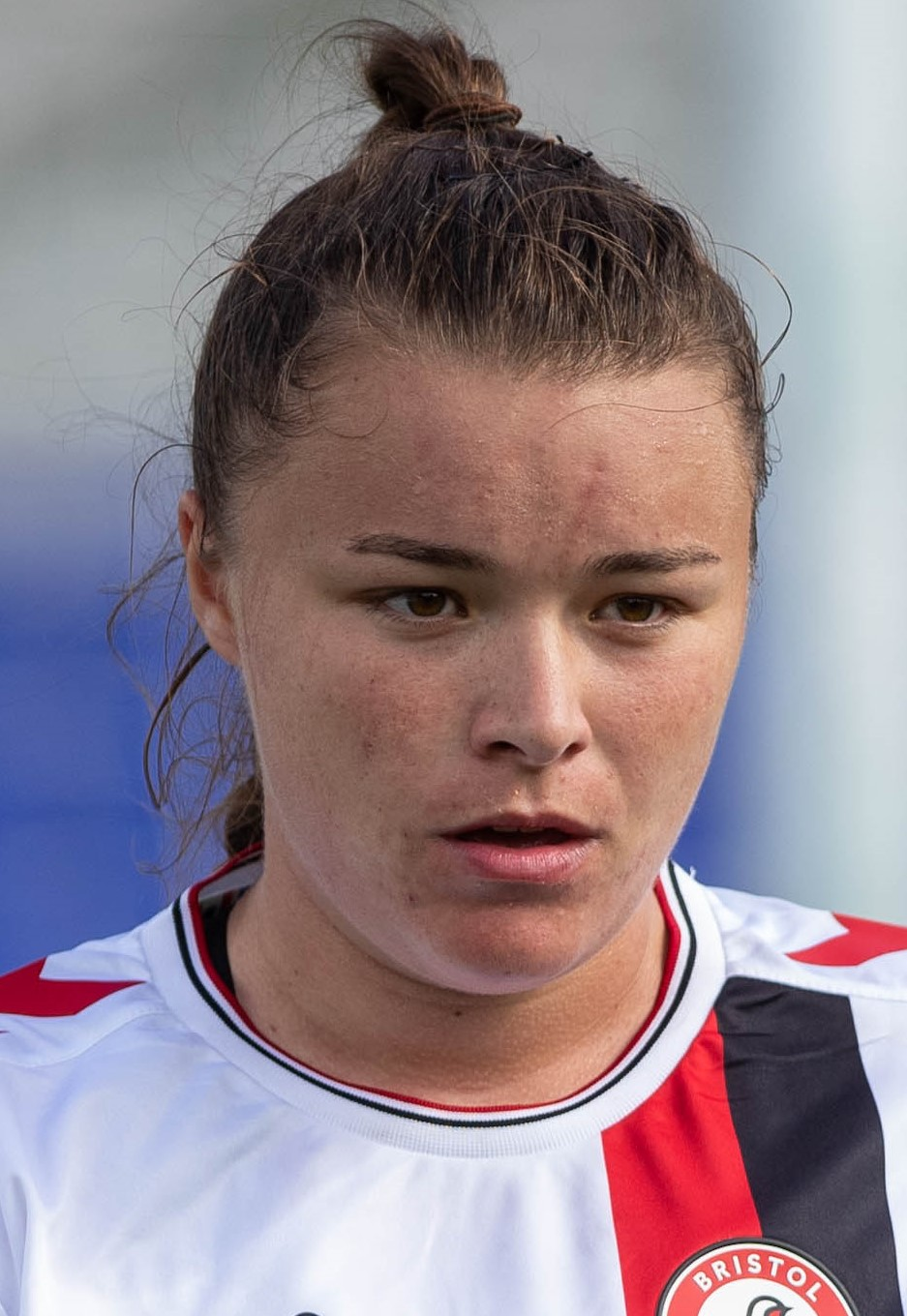
- Hutton with Bristol City in 2022.

Personal information
- Full name: Jodie Anne Hutton
- Date of birth: 11 February 2001 (age 25)
- Place of birth: England
- Position: Midfielder

Team information
- Current team: Charlton Athletic
- Number: 12

Youth career
- –2017: Aston Villa

Senior career*
Years	Team	Apps	(Gls)
2017–2022	Aston Villa	63	(10)
2022–2023	Bristol City	10	(0)
2023–2024	Sheffield United	19	(2)
2024–	Charlton Athletic	42	(13)

International career^{‡}
2018–2019	England U18	6	(0)
2019–2020	England U19	6	(0)
- * Club domestic league appearances and goals as of 23:49, 23 October 2024 (UTC) ‡ National team caps and goals as of 16:05, 18 February 2021 (UTC)

Jodie Anne Hutton (born 11 February 2001) is an English professional footballer who plays as a defender for Women's Super League club Charlton Athletic.

== Career ==
=== Aston Villa ===
Hutton is a product of the Aston Villa Women's Academy.

In the 2018–19 Women's FA Cup, Hutton scored a hat-trick against Sheffield United, which enabled Aston Villa to reach the quarter-finals of the competition. Hutton was a member of the Aston Villa squad which won promotion to the Women's Super League by winning the 2019–20 Women's Championship season.

=== Bristol City ===
On 6 July 2022, Hutton signed for Bristol City. She was involved in another promotion-winning squad, with Bristol finishing top of the league in the 2022–23 Women's Championship season.

=== Sheffield United ===
Having previously scored back-to-back hat-tricks against Sheffield United during the 2018–19 season, Hutton went on to join Sheffield United, with her signing announced on 26 July 2023.

=== Charlton Athletic ===
On 17 July 2024, Hutton was announced to have joined Charlton Athletic on a one-year contract. On 20 July 2025, it was announced that Hutton had extended her time at Charlton, signing a new two-year contract.

== Career statistics ==
=== Club ===
As of 4 march 2024

Club	Season	League			FA Cup		League Cup		Total	
Club	Season	Division	Apps	Goals	Apps	Goals	Apps	Goals	Apps	Goals
Aston Villa	2017–18	FA WSL 2	17	2	2	0	4	0	23	2
Aston Villa	2018–19	Women's Championship	17	8	3	3	5	0	25	11
Aston Villa	2019–20	Women’s Championship	8	0	1	0	4	0	13	0
Aston Villa	2020–21	Women’s Super League	17	0	2	0	2	1	21	1
Aston Villa	2021–22	Women’s Super League	4	0	1	0	4	0	9	0
Aston Villa	Total		63	10	9	3	19	1	91	14
Bristol City W.F.C.	2022–23	Women's Championship	10	0	2	1	4	1	16	2
Sheffield United F.C.	2023–24	Women's Championship	13	2	1	0	3	0	17	2
Career total			86	12	12	4	26	2	124	18

== Honours ==
Aston Villa

- FA Women's Championship: 2019–20

Bristol City

- FA Women's Championship: 2022–23

Charlton Athletic

- Women's Super League 2 play-off: 2025–26
