= Emma Follis =

English footballer

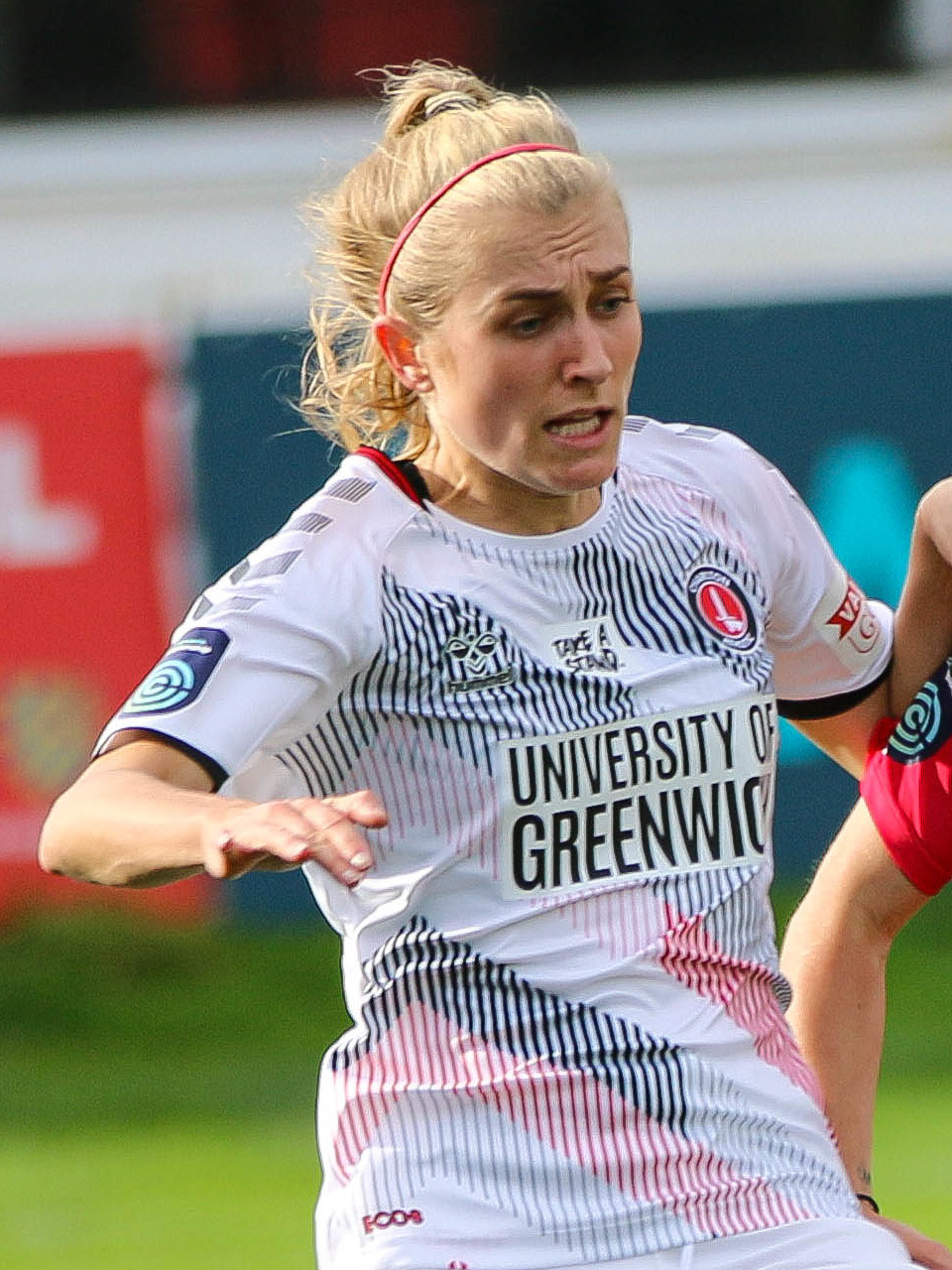
- Follis with Charlton Athletic in October 2021

Personal information
- Full name: Emma Mary Follis
- Date of birth: 6 January 1992 (age 34)
- Place of birth: Sutton Coldfield, England
- Position: Midfielder

Youth career
- –2008: Aston Villa

Senior career*
Years	Team	Apps	(Gls)
2008–2015	Aston Villa	79	
2013	→ Seattle Reign (loan)	?	(?)
2014	→ Seattle Sounders Women (loan)	?	(?)
2015–2017	Reading	16	(4)
2017–2019	Birmingham City	35	(4)
2019–2021	Aston Villa	28	(6)
2021–2023	Charlton Athletic	27	(6)

International career^{‡}
2010	England U19	4	(0)
2014–2015	England U23	3	(0)
- * Club domestic league appearances and goals as of 00:40, 16 April 2023 (UTC) ‡ National team caps and goals as of 00:40, 16 April 2023 (UTC)

Emma Mary Follis (born 6 January 1992) is an English footballer who last played as a midfielder for Charlton Athletic in the FA Women's Championship. She has previously had spells at Birmingham City and Reading F.C., as well as loan spells in the US with Seattle Reign and Seattle Sounders Women. Follis has represented England at Under 19 and Under 23 level.

Follis attended the University of Birmingham and played for the varsity team before graduating in 2013.

After leaving Charlton at the end of her contract in 2023, Follis began focusing on a career in interior design.
