= FA WSL 1 Spring Series =

2017 season of the top English women's association football league

FA WSL 1
- Season: 2017 Spring Series
- Matches: 36
- Goals: 122 (3.39 per match)
- Top goalscorer: Fran Kirby (6 goals)
- Biggest home win: Chelsea 6–0 Yeovil Town (30 April 2017)
- Biggest away win: Sunderland 0–7 Chelsea (21 May 2017)
- Highest scoring: Arsenal 4–4 Liverpool (4 May 2017)

The FA WSL 1 Spring Series was an interim edition of the FA WSL between the sixth and seventh full seasons. The Spring Series ran from February to May 2017 to bridge the gap from the 2016 FA WSL season which ran from March to September as a summer tournament, and the 2017–18 season which started in September 2017.

While the 2017–18 season planned to feature 21 clubs, the Spring Series contained 20. Notts County Ladies F.C. folded two days before they were due to play their first Spring Series game, leaving 19 teams in total. Teams played each other once, with no promotion or relegation before the full 2017–18 season.

Ten teams were due to compete in this season. Notts County Ladies announced it was folding and withdrew from the league two days before their first scheduled fixture.

== Teams ==
Locations of the Spring Series WSL 1 teams

| Team | Location | Ground | Capacity | 2016 season |
|---|---|---|---|---|
| Arsenal | Canons Park | The Hive Stadium | 5,176 | 3rd |
| Birmingham City | Solihull | Damson Park | 3,050 | 4th |
| Bristol City | Filton | Stoke Gifford Stadium | 1,500 | 2nd, WSL 2 |
| Chelsea | Staines | Wheatsheaf Park | 3,009 | 2nd |
| Liverpool | Widnes | Select Security Stadium | 13,350 | 5th |
| Manchester City | Manchester | Academy Stadium | 7,000 | 1st |
| Reading | High Wycombe | Adams Park | 9,617 | 8th |
| Sunderland | Hetton-le-Hole | Eppleton Colliery Welfare Ground | 2,500 | 7th |
| Yeovil Town | Yeovil | Huish Park | 9,565 | 1st, WSL 2 |
| Notts County | Nottingham | Meadow Lane | 20,229 | 6th |

== Table ==
| Pos | Team | Pld | W | D | L | GF | GA | GD | Pts | Qualification or relegation |
|---|---|---|---|---|---|---|---|---|---|---|
| 1 | Chelsea (C) | 8 | 6 | 1 | 1 | 32 | 3 | +29 | 19 | |
| 2 | Manchester City | 8 | 6 | 1 | 1 | 17 | 6 | +11 | 19 | |
| 3 | Arsenal | 8 | 5 | 3 | 0 | 22 | 9 | +13 | 18 | |
| 4 | Liverpool | 8 | 4 | 2 | 2 | 20 | 18 | +2 | 14 | |
| 5 | Sunderland | 8 | 2 | 3 | 3 | 4 | 14 | −10 | 9 | |
| 6 | Reading | 8 | 2 | 2 | 4 | 10 | 15 | −5 | 8 | |
| 7 | Birmingham City | 8 | 1 | 4 | 3 | 6 | 10 | −4 | 7 | |
| 8 | Bristol City | 8 | 1 | 1 | 6 | 5 | 21 | −16 | 4 | |
| 9 | Yeovil Town | 8 | 0 | 1 | 7 | 6 | 26 | −20 | 1 | |
| 10 | Notts County | 0 | 0 | 0 | 0 | 0 | 0 | 0 | 0 | Club folded before season began |

Source: FA WSL
Rules for classification: 1) Points; 2) Goal difference; 3) Number of goals scored
(C) Champions

== Results ==
| Home \ Away | ARS | BIR | BRI | CHE | LIV | MCI | NTC | REA | SUN | YEO |
|---|---|---|---|---|---|---|---|---|---|---|
| Arsenal | | 4–2 | | | 4–4 | | X–X | 1–0 | | |
| Birmingham City | | | 2–0 | 0–2 | 0–2 | | | | 0–0 | 0–0 |
| Bristol City | 0–5 | | | 0–4 | 1–1 | 0–3 | X–X | 1–3 | | |
| Chelsea | 2–2 | | | | 7–0 | | X–X | | | 6–0 |
| Liverpool | | | | | | 1–3 | X–X | 4–2 | 4–0 | |
| Manchester City | 0–1 | 1–1 | | 1–0 | | | X–X | | | 5–1 |
| Notts County | | X–X | X–X | | X–X | X–X | | X–X | X–X | X–X |
| Reading | | 1–1 | | 0–4 | | 2–3 | X–X | | | |
| Sunderland | 0–0 | | 1–0 | 0–7 | | 0–1 | X–X | 1–1 | | |
| Yeovil Town | 1–5 | | 2–3 | | 1–4 | | X–X | 0–1 | 1–2 | |

Source: FA WSL
Legend: Blue = home team win; Yellow = draw; Red = away team win.

== Top goalscorers ==
| Rank | Player | Team | Goals |
|---|---|---|---|
| 1 | (England) Fran Kirby | Chelsea | 6 |
| 2 | (Scotland) Caroline Weir | Liverpool | 5 |
| 3 | (England) Karen Carney | Chelsea | 4 |
| 3 | (England) Danielle Carter | Arsenal | 4 |
| 3 | (Scotland) Erin Cuthbert | Chelsea | 4 |
| 3 | (England) Toni Duggan | Manchester City | 4 |
| 3 | (Wales) Natasha Harding | Liverpool | 4 |
| 3 | (South Korea) Ji So-yun | Chelsea | 4 |
| 3 | (England) Jordan Nobbs | Arsenal | 4 |
| 3 | (Jamaica) Drew Spence | Chelsea | 4 |

== See also ==
- FA WSL 2 Spring Series
