= 2020–21 Birmingham City W.F.C. season =

Birmingham City
2020–21 season
- Chairman: Edward Cheng
- Head Coach: Carla Ward
- Stadium: Damson Park, Solihull
- FA WSL: 11th
- FA Cup: Quarter-final
- League Cup: Group stage
- Top goalscorer: League: Claudia Walker (5); All: Claudia Walker (8)
Home colours	Away colours	Third colours

The 2020–21 Birmingham City W.F.C. season was the club's 53rd season in existence and their 10th in the FA Women's Super League, the highest level of the football pyramid, having been founding members of the league in 2011. Along with competing in the WSL, the club will contested two domestic cup competitions: the FA Cup and the League Cup.

Carla Ward was appointed manager ahead of the new season on 13 August 2020, taking over from Charlie Baxter who had been put in charge on an interim basis following the departure of Marta Tejedor during the previous campaign.

On 5 April 2021, it was revealed a formal letter signed by all Birmingham City players had been sent to the club's board with a list of complaints including concerns about working conditions, lack of gym facilities, medical support, travel provisions, squad size and part-time coaching staff which would contradict WSL licensing rules. Numerous requests by the squad to meet with the board had previously been rejected and there was a fear that the club was not committed to funding a full-time team for the following season with only three players under contract past June 2021. The letter received support from the PFA as well as mass social media coverage from former and current players around the WSL. On 8 April, the letter was addressed in a club statement with the board expressing their disappointment an internal issue was made public, refuting the factual accuracy of many of the points reported and citing the ongoing COVID-19 pandemic as context for both the financial strain and practical difficulties with regards to providing adequate facilities but reaffirming they were still committed to supporting the team. The statement also confirmed a deal had been agreed to host the women's team's home games at the club's main St Andrew's stadium for the 2021–22 season.

On 14 May 2021, Ward announced her resignation effective as of the team's final game of the season on 16 May.

== Squad ==
As of 23 April 2021.

Note: Flags indicate national team as defined under FIFA eligibility rules; some limited exceptions apply. Players may hold more than one non-FIFA nationality.

No.	Pos.	Nation	Player
1	GK	ENG	Hannah Hampton
2	MF	ENG	Sarah Mayling
3	DF	IRL	Harriet Scott
4	MF	ENG	Ruby Mace (Note: Dual registration with Arsenal)
8	MF	ENG	Mollie Green
9	FW	GRE	Veatriki Sarri
10	MF	SCO	Christie Murray
11	FW	SCO	Abbi Grant
12	FW	IRL	Ruesha Littlejohn
14	FW	ENG	Emma Kelly
16	DF	ENG	Georgia Brougham (on loan from Everton)
17	MF	ENG	Heidi Logan
18	FW	ENG	Claudia Walker

No.	Pos.	Nation	Player
19	FW	ENG	Lucy Whipp
20	DF	SCO	Jamie-Lee Napier (on loan from Chelsea)
21	GK	ENG	Imogen Maguire
22	MF	ENG	Connie Scofield
24	GK	ENG	Sophie Whitehouse
25	MF	NIR	Rebecca Holloway
26	DF	ENG	Lily Simkin
29	MF	ENG	Ella Powell
30	DF	ENG	Gemma Lawley
32	DF	ENG	Abi Cowie
35	FW	ENG	Emily Murphy (on loan from Chelsea)
—	GK	POL	Daniela Kosinska (Note: Dual registration with Stoke City)

== FA Women's Super League ==
=== Results summary ===
Overall								Home						Away					
Pld	W	D	L	GF	GA	GD	Pts	W	D	L	GF	GA	GD	W	D	L	GF	GA	GD
22	3	6	13	15	44	−29	14^{(Note: On 7 May 2021, Birmingham City were deducted one point for fielding an ineligible player in a draw against Reading on 25 April 2021.)}	0	4	7	6	24	−18	3	2	6	9	20	−11

Last updated: 9 May 2021.
Source: FA WSL

=== Results by matchday ===
Round	1	2	3	4	5	6	7	8	9	10	11	12	13	14	15	16	17	18	19	20	21	22
Ground	A	H	H	A	A	H	A	A	A	H	A	A	H	H	H	A	H	A	H	H	A	H
Result	L	L	L	W	W	L	W	L	L	D	L	D	L	L	L	D	D	L	D	D	L	L
Position	10	11	10	8	7	7	6	7	7	8	8	9	9	9	9	9	9	9	10	9	10	11

A = Away; H = Home; W = Win; D = Draw; L = Loss

=== Results ===
6 September 2020 1	Brighton & Hove Albion	2–0	Birmingham City	Crawley
14:00	Connolly 58'; Kaagman 60'	Report	Holloway (yellow card) 66'; Scott (yellow card) 71'; Napier (yellow card) 81'; Mayling (yellow card) 90+1'	Stadium: Broadfield Stadium; Attendance: Behind-closed-doors; Referee: Rob Whitton

13 September 2020 2	Birmingham City	2–5	Manchester United	Solihull
14:00	Walker 14'; McManus 27' (o.g.)	Report	Ross 5'; Zelem 36'; Toone 47'; Hanson 60', 79'	Stadium: Damson Park; Attendance: Behind-closed-doors; Referee: Lucy Oliver

4 October 2020 3	Birmingham City	0–1	Chelsea	Solihull
14:30		Report	Kirby 9'	Stadium: Damson Park; Attendance: Behind-closed-doors; Referee: Abigail Byrne

11 October 2020 4	Reading	0–1	Birmingham City	Reading
14:00		Report	Scott (yellow card) 64'; Walker 72'; Scofield (yellow card) 82'	Stadium: Madejski Stadium; Attendance: Behind-closed-doors; Referee: Sarah Garratt

18 October 2020 5	Bristol City	0–4	Birmingham City	Bath
14:00	Matthews (yellow card) 27'	Report	Corsie 16', (yellow card) 74'; Green 32'; Walker 50'; Murray 65' (pen.); Grant (yellow card) 90' (yellow-red card) 90+7'	Stadium: Twerton Park; Attendance: Behind-closed-doors; Referee: Stacey Pearson

8 November 2020 6	Birmingham City	1–2	West Ham United	Solihull
14:00	Walker 9'; Murray (yellow card) 90'	Report	Vetterlein (yellow card) 31'; Walker 43' (o.g.); van Egmond 73'; Daly (yellow card) 90+3'	Stadium: Damson Park; Attendance: Behind-closed-doors; Referee: Richie Watkins

14 November 2020 7	Aston Villa	0–1	Birmingham City	Walsall
14:30	Hutton (yellow card) 38'	Report	Walker 72'; Scofield (yellow card) 76'	Stadium: Bescot Stadium; Attendance: Behind-closed-doors; Referee: Rebecca Welch

6 December 2020 8	Arsenal	3–0	Birmingham City	Borehamwood
14:00	Foord 57'; Roord 62'; Little 87' (pen.)	Report	Scott (yellow card) 43'	Stadium: Meadow Park; Referee: Cristiana Hattersley

13 December 2020	Birmingham City	P–P	Everton	Solihull
14:00				Stadium: Damson Park
Note: Postponed due to waterlogged pitch

20 December 2020	Birmingham City	P–P	Manchester City	Solihull
14:00				Stadium: Damson Park
Note: Postponed due to waterlogged pitch

10 January 2021 9	Tottenham Hotspur	H–W	Birmingham City	Canons Park
14:00				Stadium: The Hive
Note: Postponed due to Birmingham player shortage. On 18 March 2021, an independent tribunal awarded three points to Tottenham after Birmingham were deemed to have breached Rule 11.3.18. in failing to fulfil the fixture. No scoreline was specified.

17 January 2021 10	Birmingham City	0–0	Brighton & Hove Albion	Solihull
14:00		Report	Kerkdijk (yellow card) 64'	Stadium: Damson Park; Attendance: Behind-closed-doors; Referee: Helen Conley

20 January 2021	Birmingham City	P–P	Everton	Solihull
19:00				Stadium: Damson Park
Note: Rescheduled from 13 December 2020 due waterlogged pitch. Postponed due to waterlogged pitch.

24 January 2021 11	Manchester United	2–0	Birmingham City	Leigh
12:00	Harris (yellow card) 5'; Galton 46'; Toone (yellow card) 67', (goal) 81'; A. Turner (yellow card) 88'	Report	Littlejohn (yellow card) 45+3'; Murphy (yellow card) 90+2'	Stadium: Leigh Sports Village; Attendance: Behind-closed-doors; Referee: Stacey Pearson

7 February 2021 12	Everton	1–1	Birmingham City	Liverpool
14:00	Turner 22'; Scott (yellow card) 88'	Report	Napier 34'; McCarron (yellow card) 41'; Holloway (yellow card) 66'; Kelly (yellow card) 87'; Littlejohn (yellow card) 90+3'	Stadium: Walton Hall Park; Attendance: Behind-closed-doors; Referee: Lisa Benn

10 February 2021	Birmingham City	P–P	Aston Villa	Solihull
18:00				Stadium: Damson Park
Note: Postponed due to frozen pitch

28 February 2021 13	Birmingham City	0–4	Manchester City	Burton upon Trent
14:00	Littlejohn (yellow card) 63'	Report	Mewis 40', 52'; Hemp 53'; Weir 66'	Stadium: St George's Park; Attendance: Behind-closed-doors; Referee: Helen Conley
Note: Rescheduled from 20 December 2020 due to waterlogged pitch. Venue changed by WSL Executive Operations Committee after Damson Park was deemed not to meet requirements.

7 March 2021 14	Birmingham City	0–4	Arsenal	Burton upon Trent
14:00	Foord 37', 39'; Williamson (yellow card) 50'; Miedema 76'; Evans 90+3'	Report		Stadium: St George's Park; Attendance: Behind-closed-doors; Referee: Jane Simms
Note: Venue changed by WSL Executive Operations Committee after Damson Park was deemed not to meet requirements.

11 March 2021 15	Birmingham City	0–4	Everton	Burton upon Trent
19:00	H. Scott (yellow card) 82'	Report	MacIver (yellow card) 13'; J. Scott 36'; Lehmann 45'; Emslie 50'; Magill 88'	Stadium: St George's Park; Attendance: Behind-closed-doors; Referee: Lisa Benn
Note: Rescheduled from 20 January 2021 due to waterlogged pitch. Venue changed by WSL Executive Operations Committee after Damson Park was deemed not to meet requirements.

17 March 2021 16	West Ham United	2–2	Birmingham City	Dagenham
19:30	Flaherty (yellow card) 14'; van Egmond 46'; Svitková 73'	Report	Murphy 9'; Whipp (yellow card) 28'; Mace 90+4'	Stadium: Victoria Road; Attendance: Behind-closed-doors; Referee: Stacey Pearson

28 March 2021 17	Birmingham City	1–1	Bristol City	Solihull
16:00	Holloway (yellow card) 23'; Littlejohn (yellow card) 42'; Murray 58'	Report	Wellings 13', (yellow card) 64'; Evans (yellow card) 83'; Skeels (yellow card) 85'	Stadium: Damson Park; Attendance: Behind-closed-doors; Referee: Kirsty Dowle

4 April 2021 18	Chelsea	6–0	Birmingham City	Kingston upon Thames
12:30	Kerr 25', 45', 45+3'; Kirby 61', 90+1'; Reiten 73'; Spence (yellow card) 80'	Report	Littlejohn (yellow card) 45+2'	Stadium: Kingsmeadow; Attendance: Behind-closed-doors; Referee: Jane Simms

25 April 2021 19	Birmingham City	1–1	Reading	Solihull
14:00	Mace 6'; Littlejohn (yellow card) 78'	Report	Bartrip (yellow card) 28'; Williams (yellow card) 52'; Rowe 63'	Stadium: Damson Park; Attendance: Behind-closed-doors; Referee: Lucy May
Note: On 7 May 2021, Birmingham were deducted the point earned from this game having fielded Ruesha Littlejohn in error, thinking the player had served her league suspension in the FA Cup game seven days earlier. The club were also fined £400 and Littlejohn was forced to serve a one match ban.

28 April 2021 20	Birmingham City	1–1	Aston Villa	Solihull
18:00	Kelly (yellow card) 33'; Mayling (yellow card) 40'; Sarri 90+6'	Report	Gregory 28'; Hutton (yellow card) 42'; Silva (yellow card) 90+4'	Stadium: Damson Park; Attendance: Behind-closed-doors; Referee: Jane Simms
Note: Rescheduled from 10 February 2021 due to frozen pitch

2 May 2021 21	Manchester City	4–0	Birmingham City	Manchester
15:00	Kelly 10', 23'; Morgan 85'; Mewis 90+4'	Report		Stadium: Academy Stadium; Attendance: Behind-closed-doors; Referee: Emily Heaslip

9 May 2021 22	Birmingham City	0–1	Tottenham Hotspur	Solihull
14:30	Scott (yellow card) 88'	Report	Graham 71'	Stadium: Damson Park; Attendance: Behind-closed-doors; Referee: Lisa Benn

=== League table ===
Pos	Team	Pld	W	D	L	GF	GA	GD	Pts	Qualification or relegation
8	Tottenham Hotspur	22	5	5	12	18	41	−23	20	
9	West Ham United	22	3	6	13	21	39	−18	15	
10	Aston Villa	22	3	6	13	15	47	−32	15	
11	Birmingham City	22	3	6	13	15	44	−29	14 (Note: On 7 May 2021, Birmingham City were deducted one point for fielding an ineligible player in a draw against Reading on 25 April 2021.)	
12	Bristol City (R)	22	2	6	14	18	72	−54	12	Relegation to the Championship

Source: FA WSL
Rules for classification: 1) Points; 2) Goal difference; 3) Number of goals scored.
(R) Relegated

== Women's FA Cup ==
As a member of the top two tiers, Birmingham City will enter the FA Cup in the fourth round proper. Originally scheduled to take place on 31 January 2021, it was delayed due to COVID-19 restrictions. Due to the delay, the competition only reached the fifth round before the end of the season. It resumed at the quarter-final stage the following season on 29 September 2021, at which point Scott Booth was Birmingham City manager.

18 April 2021 Fourth round	Birmingham City	5–1	Coventry United	Solihull
14:00	Walker 3', 77'; Murphy 66'; Mayling 90+1', 90+3'	Report	Stevens 90+2'	Stadium: Damson Park; Attendance: Behind-closed-doors

16 May 2021 Fifth round	Birmingham City	3–2	Southampton	Solihull
12:30	Green 37'; Murphy 58'; Mayling 67'	Report	Morris 84'; Pusey 87'	Stadium: Damson Park; Attendance: Behind-closed-doors

29 September 2021 Quarter-final	Birmingham City	0–4	Chelsea	Birmingham
19:45		Report	Kerr 61'; Kirby 70', 72'; Harder 90+3'	Stadium: St Andrew's; Referee: Elizabeth Simms
Note: Managed by Scott Booth

== FA Women's League Cup ==
7 October 2020 Group stage	Blackburn Rovers	0–1	Birmingham City	Bamber Bridge
19:45		Report	Walker 81'	Stadium: Irongate; Attendance: Behind-closed-doors

9 December 2020 Group stage	Birmingham City	0–0 (5–6 p)	Leicester City	Solihull
14:00		Report	Barker (yellow card) 35'	Stadium: Damson Park; Attendance: Behind-closed-doors; Referee: Sarah Garratt
	Penalties
	Murray (penalty scored); Walker (penalty scored); Hampton (penalty scored); Brougham (penalty scored); Corsie (penalty scored); Scofield (penalty missed)		(penalty scored) Allen; (penalty scored) Devlin; (penalty scored) Smith; (penalty scored) Plumptre; (penalty scored) Blanchard; (penalty scored) Everett
Note: Rescheduled from 18 November 2020 following positive COVID-19 test by Birmingham player.

Group E

Pos	Team	Pld	W	WPEN	LPEN	L	GF	GA	GD	Pts	Qualification
1	Leicester City	2	1	1	0	0	5	2	+3	5	Advanced to knock-out stage
2	Birmingham City	2	1	0	1	0	1	0	+1	4	Possible knock-out stage based on ranking
3	Blackburn Rovers	2	0	0	0	2	2	6	−4	0	

Source: thefa.com
Rules for classification: 1) Points; 2) Goal difference; 3) Number of goals scored; 4) Number of wins; 5) Head-to-head record

Ranking of second-placed teams

Pos	Grp	Team	Pld	W	WPEN	LPEN	L	GF	GA	GD	Pts	PPG	Qualification
1	A	Durham	3	2	0	1	0	12	3	+9	7	2.33	Advanced to knock-out stage
2	F	Crystal Palace	3	2	0	0	1	10	6	+4	6	2.00	Advanced to knock-out stage
3	D	Reading	3	2	0	0	1	6	3	+3	6	2.00	
4	E	Birmingham City	2	1	0	1	0	1	0	+1	4	2.00	
5	C	Everton	3	2	0	0	1	3	3	0	6	2.00	
6	B	Arsenal	3	1	1	0	1	7	6	+1	5	1.67	

Source: thefa.com

== Squad statistics ==
=== Appearances ===
As of 29 September 2021

Starting appearances are listed first, followed by substitute appearances after the + symbol where applicable.

No.	Pos	Nat	Player	Total		FA WSL		FA Cup		League Cup	
No.	Pos	Nat	Player	Apps	Goals	Apps	Goals	Apps	Goals	Apps	Goals
1	GK	(England) ENG	Hannah Hampton	23	0	21	0	0+1	0	1	0
2	MF	(England) ENG	Sarah Mayling	21	3	18	0	2	3	0+1	0
3	DF	(Republic of Ireland) IRL	Harriet Scott	23	0	20	0	1+1	0	1	0
4	MF	(England) ENG	Ruby Mace	13	2	11	2	2	0	0	0
8	MF	(England) ENG	Mollie Green	21	2	11+6	1	2	1	2	0
9	FW	(Greece) GRE	Veatriki Sarri	3	1	0+1	1	2	0	0	0
10	MF	(Scotland) SCO	Christie Murray	20	2	15+1	2	2	0	0+2	0
11	FW	(Scotland) SCO	Abbi Grant	4	0	0+2	0	0+1	0	1	0
12	FW	(Republic of Ireland) IRL	Ruesha Littlejohn	11	0	11	0	0	0	0	0
14	FW	(England) ENG	Emma Kelly	19	0	8+8	0	1	0	2	0
16	DF	(England) ENG	Georgia Brougham	23	0	19	0	1+1	0	2	0
17	MF	(England) ENG	Heidi Logan	1	0	0	0	0+1	0	0	0
18	FW	(England) ENG	Claudia Walker	25	8	20+1	5	2	2	1+1	1
19	MF	(England) ENG	Lucy Whipp	24	0	12+8	0	2+1	0	1	0
20	DF	(Scotland) SCO	Jamie-Lee Napier	23	1	17+2	1	2	0	2	0
21	GK	(England) ENG	Imogen Maguire	0	0	0	0	0	0	0	0
22	MF	(England) ENG	Connie Scofield	10	0	6+2	0	0	0	1+1	0
24	GK	(England) ENG	Sophie Whitehouse	2	0	0	0	2	0	0	0
25	MF	(Northern Ireland) NIR	Rebecca Holloway	26	0	20+1	0	3	0	1+1	0
26	DF	(England) ENG	Lily Simkin	0	0	0	0	0	0	0	0
29	MF	(England) ENG	Ella Powell	0	0	0	0	0	0	0	0
30	DF	(England) ENG	Gemma Lawley	9	0	2+3	0	2	0	2	0
32	DF	(England) ENG	Abi Cowie	1	0	0	0	0+1	0	0	0
35	FW	(England) ENG	Emily Murphy	13	3	8+3	1	0+2	2	0	0
	GK	(Poland) POL	Daniela Kosinska	1	0	0	0	0	0	1	0
Joined during 2021–22 season but competed in the postponed 2020–21 FA Cup:
1	GK	(Republic of Ireland) IRL	Marie Hourihan	1	0	0	0	1	0	0	0
4	DF	(Republic of Ireland) IRL	Louise Quinn	1	0	0	0	1	0	0	0
8	MF	(Scotland) SCO	Lisa Robertson	1	0	0	0	1	0	0	0
11	FW	(England) ENG	Jade Pennock	1	0	0	0	1	0	0	0
14	MF	(Republic of Ireland) IRL	Jamie Finn	1	0	0	0	1	0	0	0
22	FW	(Republic of Ireland) IRL	Eleanor Ryan-Doyle	1	0	0	0	1	0	0	0
23	FW	(Republic of Ireland) IRL	Emily Whelan	1	0	0	0	1	0	0	0
Players who appeared for the club but left during the season:
4	DF	(Scotland) SCO	Rachel Corsie	9	1	7	1	0	0	1+1	0
7	MF	(Northern Ireland) NIR	Chloe McCarron	12	0	4+6	0	0	0	2	0
23	MF	(England) ENG	Destiney Toussaint	8	0	1+5	0	0	0	1+1	0

== Transfers ==
=== Transfers in ===
Date	Position	Nationality	Name	From	Ref.
21 August 2020	MF	(Scotland)	Christie Murray	(England) Liverpool	
28 August 2020	MF	(Northern Ireland)	Chloe McCarron	(Northern Ireland) Linfield	
6 September 2020	MF	(England)	Destiney Toussaint	(England) London Bees	
7 September 2020	MF	(England)	Mollie Green	(England) Manchester United	
7 January 2021	FW	(Greece)	Veatriki Sarri	(England) Sheffield United	
16 January 2021	FW	(Republic of Ireland)	Ruesha Littlejohn	(England) Leicester City	
30 January 2021	GK	(England)	Sophie Whitehouse	(England) Tottenham Hotspur	

=== Loans in ===
Date	Position	Nationality	Name	From	Until	Ref.
28 August 2020	DF	(Scotland)	Rachel Corsie	(United States) Utah Royals	15 January 2021	
4 September 2020	DF	(England)	Georgia Brougham	(England) Everton	End of season	
4 September 2020	DF	(Scotland)	Jamie-Lee Napier	(England) Chelsea	End of season	
7 October 2020	GK	(Poland)	Daniela Kosinska (Note: Dual registration)	(England) Stoke City	End of season	
16 January 2021	FW	(England)	Emily Murphy	(England) Chelsea	End of season	
2 February 2021	MF	(England)	Ruby Mace	(England) Arsenal	End of season	

=== Transfers out ===
Date	Position	Nationality	Name	To	Ref.
28 May 2020	MF	(United States)	Brianna Visalli	(United States) Houston Dash	
1 June 2020	DF	(United States)	Adrienne Jordan	(United States) OL Reign	
4 June 2020	DF	(England)	Freya Gregory	(England) Aston Villa	
4 June 2020	MF	(England)	Abbey Jones	(England) Aston Villa	
7 June 2020	MF	(England)	Olivia Rabjohn	(England) Aston Villa	
10 June 2020	GK	(England)	Alexandra Brooks	(England) Blackburn Rovers	
19 June 2020	MF	(Scotland)	Chloe Arthur	(England) Aston Villa	
19 June 2020	MF	(England)	Lucy Staniforth	(England) Manchester United	
30 June 2020	DF	(England)	Kerys Harrop	(England) Tottenham Hotspur	
30 June 2020	MF	(England)	Laura Brown	(England) Aston Villa	
30 June 2020	FW	(England)	Missy Goodwin	(England) Aston Villa	
1 July 2020	FW	(England)	Rachel Williams	(England) Tottenham Hotspur	
15 January 2021	MF	(England)	Destiney Toussaint	(England) Coventry United	
23 April 2021	MF	(Northern Ireland)	Chloe McCarron	(Northern Ireland) Glentoran	
