= List of English women's football transfers summer 2020 =

The 2020 English women's football summer transfer window ran from 19 June to 10 September 2020. Players without a club could be signed at any time, clubs could sign players on loan dependent on their league's regulations, and clubs could sign a goalkeeper on an emergency loan if they had no registered senior goalkeeper available. This list includes transfers featuring at least one club from either the Women's Super League or the Women's Super League 2 that were completed after the end of the winter 2019–20 transfer window on 3 February and before the end of the 2020 summer window.

== Transfers ==
All players and clubs without a flag are English.

Date	Name	Moving from	Moving to	Fee	Ref.
23 March 2020	(Germany) Melanie Leupolz	(Germany) Bayern Munich	Chelsea	Undisclosed	
15 April 2020	Ellie Arnold	London City Lionesses	(United States) USC Upstate Spartans	Free	
1 April 2020	Jade Moore	Reading	(United States) Orlando Pride	Undisclosed	
28 May 2020	(United States) Brianna Visalli	Birmingham City	(United States) Houston Dash	Free	
8 June 2020	(United States) Adrienne Jordan	Birmingham City	(United States) OL Reign	Free	
12 June 2020	(Denmark) Katrine Veje	Arsenal	(Sweden) FC Rosengård	Undisclosed	
15 June 2020	(Netherlands) Maxime Bennick	Reading	(Netherlands) PEC Zwolle	Free	
16 June 2020	(Finland) Adelina Engman	Chelsea	(France) Montpellier	Undisclosed	
17 June 2020	Deanna Cooper	Chelsea	Reading	Free	
23 June 2020	Niamh Charles	Liverpool	Chelsea	Free	
24 June 2020	(Norway) Lisa-Marie Karlseng Utland	Reading	(Sweden) Rosenborg	Free	
30 June 2020	(Australia) Ella Mastrantonio	(Australia) Western Sydney Wanderers	Bristol City	Free	
1 July 2020	(Germany) Pauline Bremer	Manchester City	(Germany) Wolfsburg	Free	
1 July 2020	(France) Pauline Peyraud-Magnin	Arsenal	(Spain) Atlético Madrid	Free	
1 July 2020	Rachel Williams	Birmingham City	Tottenham Hotspur	Free	
2 July 2020	(Scotland) Chloe Arthur	Birmingham City	Aston Villa	Free	
2 July 2020	(Australia) Steph Catley	(Australia) Melbourne City	Arsenal	Undisclosed	
2 July 2020	Aimee Palmer	Manchester United	Bristol City	Free	
3 July 2020	(Switzerland) Ramona Bachmann	Chelsea	(France) Paris Saint-Germain	Undisclosed	
3 July 2020	(Switzerland) Malin Gut	(Switzerland) Grasshopper	Arsenal	Undisclosed	
3 July 2020	Chloe Kelly	Everton	Manchester City	Free	
6 July 2020	Anita Asante	Chelsea	Aston Villa	Free	
6 July 2020	Katie Startup	Charlton Athletic	Brighton & Hove Albion	Free	
6 July 2020	(Wales) Megan Wynne	Tottenham Hotspur	Bristol City	Free	
7 July 2020	Rachael Laws	Reading	Liverpool	Free	
7 July 2020	Poppy Pattinson	Bristol City	Everton	Free	
7 July 2020	Jemma Purfield	Liverpool	Bristol City	Free	
8 July 2020	(Australia) Lydia Williams	(Australia) Melbourne City	Arsenal	Undisclosed	
9 July 2020	(Norway) Ingrid Moe Wold	(Spain) Madrid CFF	Everton	Free	
9 July 2020	Lucy Staniforth	Birmingham City	Manchester United	Free	
9 July 2020	(Australia) Mackenzie Arnold	(Australia) Brisbane Roar	West Ham United	Free	
10 July 2020	(Switzerland) Noelle Maritz	(Germany) Wolfsburg	Arsenal	Undisclosed	
10 July 2020	Maz Pacheco	Reading	West Ham United	Free	
12 July 2020	(Republic of Ireland) Alli Murphy	(Iceland) Selfoss	London City Lionesses	Free	
13 July 2020	(Spain) Ona Batlle	(Spain) Levante	Manchester United	Undisclosed	
13 July 2020	Katie Robinson	Bristol City	Brighton & Hove Albion	Free	
14 July 2020	(Brazil) Ivana Fuso	(Switzerland) FC Basel	Manchester United	Free	
14 July 2020	(Denmark) Nicoline Sørensen	(Denmark) Brøndby IF	Everton	Free	
15 July 2020	Danielle Carter	Arsenal	Reading	Free	
15 July 2020	(Finland) Nora Heroum	(Italy) AC Milan	Brighton & Hove Albion	Free	
15 July 2020	(Scotland) Emma Mukandi	Arsenal	Reading	Free	
16 July 2020	(Wales) Loren Dykes	Bristol City	(Wales) Cardiff City	Free	
16 July 2020	Taylor Hinds	Everton	Liverpool	Free	
16 July 2020	(Denmark) Rikke Sevecke	(France) Fleury 91	Everton	Free	
16 July 2020	(United States) Shae Yanez	(Spain) Santa Teresa	London City Lionesses	Free	
16 July 2020	(Czech Republic) Kateřina Svitková	(Czech Republic) Slavia Praha	West Ham	Free	
17 July 2020	(Netherlands) Inessa Kaagman	Everton	Brighton & Hove Albion	Free	
17 July 2020	(Denmark) Amalie Thestrup	(Italy) AS Roma	Liverpool	Free	
20 July 2020	(Germany) Anke Preuß	Liverpool	(Sweden) Vittsjö	Free	
20 July 2020	(France) Hawa Cissoko	(France) ASJ Soyaux	West Ham	Free	
22 July 2020	(Canada) Jessie Fleming	(United States) UCLA Bruins	Chelsea	Undisclosed	
23 July 2020	Kerys Harrop	Birmingham City	Tottenham Hotspur	Free	
24 July 2020	(South Korea) Lee Geum-min	Manchester City	Brighton & Hove Albion	Loan	
24 July 2020	(Sweden) Nor Mustafa	(Sweden) Eskilstuna United	West Ham	Free	
27 July 2020	(Norway) Aurora Mikalsen	Manchester United	Tottenham Hotspur	Free	
28 July 2020	(Belgium) Tessa Wullaert	Manchester City	(Belgium) Anderlecht	Free	
29 July 2020	(Republic of Ireland) Louise Quinn	Arsenal	(Italy) Fiorentina	Free	
31 July 2020	(Scotland) Lizzie Arnot	Manchester United	(Scotland) Rangers	Free	
4 August 2020	(Portugal) Matilde Fidalgo	Manchester City	(Portugal) Benfica	Undisclosed	
6 August 2020	(France) Valérie Gauvin	(France) Montpellier	Everton	Undisclosed	
9 August 2020	Lilly Pursey	Chelsea	London City Lionesses	Free	
10 August 2020	Alexandra Brooks	Birmingham City	Blackburn Rovers	Free	
10 August 2020	(United States) Sam Mewis	(United States) North Carolina Courage	Manchester City	Undisclosed	
12 August 2020	Emma Doyle	Everton	Blackburn Rovers	Free	
14 August 2020	Erin Nayler	(France) Girondins de Bordeaux	Reading	Undisclosed	
14 August 2020	Ruby Grant	Arsenal	West Ham	Free	
18 August 2020	(United States) Rose Lavelle	(United States) OL Reign	Manchester City	Undisclosed	
19 August 2020	Emma Bissell	Manchester City	Bristol City	Undisclosed	
19 August 2020	(Wales) Jess Fishlock	(United States) OL Reign	Reading	Loan	
20 August 2020	(Australia) Alanna Kennedy	(United States) Orlando Pride	Tottenham Hotspur	Loan	
20 August 2020	(Canada) Shelina Zadorsky	(United States) Orlando Pride	Tottenham Hotspur	Loan	
21 August 2020	(Scotland) Christie Murray	Liverpool	Birmingham City	Free	
22 August 2020	Remi Allen	Reading	Leicester City	Free	
22 August 2020	(Wales) Hannah Cain	Everton	Leicester City	Free	
22 August 2020	(Scotland) Claire Emslie	(United States) Orlando Pride	Everton	Loan	
22 August 2020	Millie Farrow	Reading	Leicester City	Free	
22 August 2020	(Scotland) Sophie Howard	Reading	Leicester City	Free	
22 August 2020	Fran Kitching	Liverpool	Sheffield United	Free	
22 August 2020	Kirstie Levell	Everton	Leicester City	Free	
25 August 2020	(Scotland) Eartha Cumings	Bristol City	Charlton Athletic	Free	
26 August 2020	(Wales) Charlie Estcourt	Reading	London Bees	Free	
28 August 2020	(Scotland) Rachel Corsie	(United States) Utah Royals	Birmingham City	Loan	
28 August 2020	(Northern Ireland) Chloe McCarron	(Northern Ireland) Linfield	Birmingham City	Undisclosed	
28 August 2020	(New Zealand) Meikayla Moore	(Germany) MSV Duisburg	Liverpool	Free	
28 August 2020	(Republic of Ireland) Hayley Nolan	(United States) Connecticut Fusion	London City Lionesses	Free	
1 September 2020	Fran Bentley	Manchester United	Blackburn Rovers	Loan	
1 September 2020	(Spain) Damaris Egurrola	(Spain) Athletic Bilbao	Everton	Free	
1 September 2020	(Denmark) Pernille Harder	(Germany) Wolfsburg	Chelsea	£300,000	
2 September 2020	(New Zealand) Rebekah Stott	(Australia) Melbourne City	Brighton & Hove Albion	Free	
3 September 2020	(Norway) Benedicte Håland	(Switzerland) Lugano	Bristol City	Free	
4 September 2020	Georgia Brougham	Everton	Birmingham City	Loan	
4 September 2020	Siobhan Chamberlain	Manchester United	Retired		
4 September 2020	(South Korea) Jeon Ga-eul	Bristol City	Reading	Free	
4 September 2020	Atlanta Primus	(United States) Cal State Fullerton Titans	London City Lionesses	Free	
5 September 2020	(Northern Ireland) Laura Rafferty	Brighton & Hove Albion	Bristol City	Loan	
5 September 2020	Ella Rutherford	Bristol City	Charlton Athletic	Free	
6 September 2020	Evie Clarke	London City Lionesses	Hashtag United	Free	
6 September 2020	(Scotland) Jamie-Lee Napier	Chelsea	Birmingham City	Loan	
6 September 2020	Destiney Toussaint	London Bees	Birmingham City	Free	
7 September 2020	Mollie Green	Manchester United	Birmingham City	Free	
8 September 2020	Lucy Bronze	(France) Lyon	Manchester City	Undisclosed	
9 September 2020	Alex Greenwood	(France) Lyon	Manchester City	Free	
9 September 2020	(United States) Tobin Heath	(United States) Portland Thorns	Manchester United	Undisclosed	
9 September 2020	(Republic of Ireland) Denise O'Sullivan	(United States) North Carolina Courage	Brighton & Hove Albion	Loan	
9 September 2020	(United States) Christen Press	(United States) Utah Royals	Manchester United	Undisclosed	
10 September 2020	Alessia Russo	(United States) North Carolina Tar Heels	Manchester United	Undisclosed	
11 September 2020	Lotte Wubben-Moy	(United States) North Carolina Tar Heels	Arsenal	Undisclosed	
12 September 2020	(Wales) Elise Hughes	Everton	Blackburn Rovers	Loan	
