= 2019–20 Birmingham City W.F.C. season =

Birmingham City
2019–20 season
- Chairman: Edward Cheng
- Head Coach: Marta Tejedor (until 3 March); Charlie Baxter (interim, from 3 March)
- Stadium: Damson Park, Solihull
- FA WSL: 11th
- FA Cup: Semi-final
- League Cup: Group stage
- Top goalscorer: League: Abbi Grant (2); All: Lucy Staniforth (5)
- Highest home attendance: 1,197 (vs. Manchester City, 19 January)
- Lowest home attendance: League: 304 (vs. Tottenham Hotspur, 4 December)
- Average home league attendance: 875 as of 23 February 2020
Home colours	Away colours

The 2019–20 Birmingham City W.F.C. season was the club's 52nd season in existence and their ninth in the FA Women's Super League, the highest level of the football pyramid, having been founding members of the league in 2011. Along with competing in the WSL, the club also contested two domestic cup competitions: the FA Cup and the League Cup.

On 13 March 2020, in line with the FA's response to the coronavirus pandemic, it was announced the season was temporarily suspended until at least 3 April 2020. After further postponements, the season was ultimately ended prematurely on 25 May 2020 with immediate effect. Birmingham sat in 11th at the time and retained their position on sporting merit after The FA Board's decision to award places on a points-per-game basis.

== Squad ==
As of 10 January 2020.

Note: Flags indicate national team as defined under FIFA eligibility rules; some limited exceptions apply. Players may hold more than one non-FIFA nationality.

No.	Pos.	Nation	Player
1	GK	(England) ENG	Hannah Hampton
2	MF	(England) ENG	Sarah Mayling
3	DF	(Republic of Ireland) IRL	Harriet Scott
6	DF	(England) ENG	Kerys Harrop (captain)
7	MF	(Scotland) SCO	Chloe Arthur
8	FW	(England) ENG	Rachel Williams
10	MF	(United States) USA	Brianna Visalli
11	FW	(Scotland) SCO	Abbi Grant
13	GK	(England) ENG	Alexandra Brooks
14	FW	(England) ENG	Emma Kelly
15	DF	(United States) USA	Adrienne Jordan
16	DF	(England) ENG	Georgia Brougham (on loan from Everton)
17	MF	(England) ENG	Heidi Logan

No.	Pos.	Nation	Player
18	MF	(England) ENG	Connie Scofield
19	FW	(England) ENG	Lucy Whipp
20	FW	(England) ENG	Claudia Walker
21	GK	(England) ENG	Imogen Maguire
22	MF	(England) ENG	Missy Goodwin
23	MF	(England) ENG	Freya Gregory
24	MF	(England) ENG	Olivia Rabjohn
25	MF	(Northern Ireland) NIR	Rebecca Holloway
26	DF	(England) ENG	Lily Simkin
27	MF	(England) ENG	Abbey Jones
28	MF	(England) ENG	Laura Brown
37	MF	(England) ENG	Lucy Staniforth

== FA Women's Super League ==
=== Results summary ===
Overall								Home						Away					
Pld	W	D	L	GF	GA	GD	Pts	W	D	L	GF	GA	GD	W	D	L	GF	GA	GD
13	2	1	10	5	23	−18	7	1	1	4	3	11	−8	1	0	6	2	12	−10

Last updated: 23 February 2020.
Source: FA WSL

=== Results by matchday ===
Round	1	2	3	4	5	6	7	8	9	10	11	12	13	14	15	16	17	18	19	20	21	22
Ground	H	A	A	H	A	H	H	A	A	A	H	A	H	A	H	A	H	A	H	H	A	H
Result	L	L	L	W	L	L	D	W	L	L	L	L	L	C	C	C	C	C	C	C	C	C
Position	9	10	12	9	10	11	10	9	10	10	10	10	11									

A = Away; H = Home; W = Win; D = Draw; L = Loss

=== Results ===
8 September 2019 1	Birmingham City	0–1	Everton	Solihull
14:00	Harrop (yellow card) 22'; Grant (yellow card) 83'	Report	Morgan (yellow card) 39'; Harrop 46' (o.g.)	Stadium: Damson Park; Attendance: 873; Referee: Elliott Swallow

15 September 2019 2	West Ham United	1–0	Birmingham City	Romford
15:00	Longhurst (yellow card) 18'; Leon 27'	Report	Harrop (yellow card) 19'; Holloway (yellow card) 24'	Stadium: Rush Green Stadium; Attendance: 1,297; Referee: Paul Howard

29 September 2019	Birmingham City	P–P	Reading	Solihull
14:00				Stadium: Damson Park
Note: Postponed due to waterlogged pitch

12 October 2019 3	Manchester City	3–0	Birmingham City	Manchester
14:00	Walsh 27'; Wullaert 48'; Bonner (yellow card) 74'; Lee 80'	Report		Stadium: Academy Stadium; Attendance: 1,834; Referee: Helen Conley

27 October 2019 4	Birmingham City	2–0	Liverpool	Solihull
14:00	Harrop 9'; Arthur (yellow card) 68'; Staniforth 83'	Report		Stadium: Damson Park; Attendance: 1,056; Referee: Lisa Benn

17 November 2019 5	Brighton & Hove Albion	3–0	Birmingham City	Falmer
14:00	Green 15' (pen.), 71'; Le Garrec 44'	Report		Stadium: Amex Stadium; Attendance: 4,130; Referee: Helen Conley

24 November 2019 6	Birmingham City	0–6	Chelsea	Solihull
14:45		Report	Ji 2'; Bright 37'; England 45+1', 63'; Spence 48', 52'	Stadium: Damson Park; Attendance: 1,159; Referee: Stacey Pearson

4 December 2019 7	Birmingham City	1–1	Tottenham Hotspur	Solihull
19:45	Grant 22'; Scott (yellow card) 35'; Staniforth (yellow card) 76'	Report	Neville (yellow card) 30'; Graham (yellow card) 67', (goal) 73'	Stadium: Damson Park; Attendance: 304; Referee: Jane Simms

8 December 2019 8	Bristol City	0–2	Birmingham City	Filton
15:00	Pattinson (yellow card) 36'; Wilson (yellow card) 36'	Report	Whipp 5'; Walker (yellow card) 26'; Grant 65'	Stadium: Stoke Gifford Stadium; Attendance: 404; Referee: Sam Allison

15 December 2019	Birmingham City	P–P	Manchester United	Solihull
14:00				Stadium: Damson Park
Note: Postponed due to waterlogged pitch

5 January 2020 9	Arsenal	2–0	Birmingham City	Borehamwood
14:00	Little 9'; Nobbs 23'	Report		Stadium: Meadow Park; Attendance: 2,106; Referee: Elizabeth Simms

12 January 2020 10	Reading	1–0	Birmingham City	High Wycombe
14:00	Eikeland 39'; Moore (yellow card) 45+3'	Report	Williams (yellow card) 72'	Stadium: Adams Park; Attendance: 733; Referee: Thomas Bisham

19 January 2020 11	Birmingham City	0–2	Manchester City	Solihull
14:00		Report	White 1'; Walsh 65'	Stadium: Damson Park; Attendance: 1,197; Referee: Helen Conley

2 February 2020	Liverpool	P–P	Birmingham City	Birkenhead
12:00				Stadium: Prenton Park
Note: Postponed due to waterlogged pitch

9 February 2020	Birmingham City	P–P	Brighton & Hove Albion	Solihull
14:00				Stadium: Damson Park
Note: All WSL games postponed due to adverse weather conditions

12 February 2020 12	Chelsea	2–0	Birmingham City	Kingston upon Thames
19:00	Reiten 45'; England 58'	Report		Stadium: Kingsmeadow; Attendance: 1,928; Referee: Robert Whitton

23 February 2020 13	Birmingham City	0–1	Bristol City	Solihull
14:00		Report	Bryson (yellow card) 66'; Salmon 75'	Stadium: Damson Park; Attendance: 659; Referee: Stacey Pearson

22 March 2020 14	Tottenham Hotspur	Cancelled	Birmingham City	Canons Park
14:00				Stadium: The Hive Stadium
Note: Cancelled due to coronavirus pandemic

25 March 2020 15	Birmingham City	Cancelled	Manchester United	Solihull
19:30				Stadium: Damson Park
Note: Rescheduled from 15 December 2019. Cancelled due to coronavirus pandemic

29 March 2020 16	Everton	Cancelled	Birmingham City	Liverpool
12:30				Stadium: Walton Hall Park
Note: Cancelled due to coronavirus pandemic

5 April 2020 17	Birmingham City	Cancelled	West Ham United	Solihull
14:00				Stadium: Damson Park
Note: Cancelled due to coronavirus pandemic

22 April 2020 21	Liverpool	Cancelled	Birmingham City
Note: Rescheduled from 2 February 2020. Cancelled due to coronavirus pandemic

26 April 2020 18	Birmingham City	Cancelled	Arsenal	Solihull
14:00				Stadium: Damson Park
Note: Cancelled due to coronavirus pandemic

6 May 2020 19	Birmingham City	Cancelled	Reading	Solihull
19:30				Stadium: Damson Park
Note: Rescheduled from 29 September 2019. Cancelled due to coronavirus pandemic

16 May 2020 20	Manchester United	Cancelled	Birmingham City	Leigh
15:00				Stadium: Leigh Sports Village
Note: Cancelled due to coronavirus pandemic

22	Birmingham City	Cancelled	Brighton & Hove Albion	Solihull
				Stadium: Damson Park
Note: Rescheduled from 9 February 2020. Cancelled due to coronavirus pandemic

=== League table ===
Pos	Team	Pld	W	D	L	GF	GA	GD	Pts	PPG	Qualification
8	West Ham United	14	5	1	8	19	34	−15	16	1.14	
9	Brighton & Hove Albion	16	3	4	9	11	30	−19	13	0.81	
10	Bristol City	14	2	3	9	9	38	−29	9	0.64	
11	Birmingham City	13	2	1	10	5	23	−18	7	0.54	
12	Liverpool (R)	14	1	3	10	8	20	−12	6	0.43	Relegation to the Championship

Source: FA WSL, BBC
Rules for classification: Initially: 1) Points; 2) Goal difference; 3) Number of goals scored. After abandonment of season: 1) Points per game
(R) Relegated

== Women's FA Cup ==
As a member of the top two tiers, Birmingham entered the FA Cup in the fourth round. The round was played on 26 January 2020 with Birmingham beating Championship side Sheffield United. Former Sunderland player Lucy Staniforth scored the only goal against the third-tier team before being sent off against her old club in a fifth round victory, setting up an all-WSL tie against Brighton & Hove Albion in the quarter-finals. However, the match was postponed due to the coronavirus pandemic before the season was ultimately curtailed. On 24 July 2020 it was announced the 2019–20 FA Cup would resume play during the 2020–21 season starting with the quarter-final ties rescheduled for the weekend of 26/27 September 2020.

26 January 2020 Fourth round	Sheffield United	0–3	Birmingham City	Chesterfield
		Report	Scott 55', 90+2'; Staniforth 59'	Stadium: Proact Stadium; Attendance: 335; Referee: Adam Williamson

16 February 2020 Fifth round	Sunderland	0–1	Birmingham City	Hetton-le-Hole
	Ramshaw (yellow card) 84'	Report	Scott (yellow card) 55'; Staniforth 85', (red card) 86'	Stadium: Eppleton CW; Referee: Elizabeth Simms

15 March 2020 Quarter-final	Brighton & Hove Albion	P–P	Birmingham City	Crawley
				Stadium: Broadfield Stadium
Note: Postponed due to coronavirus pandemic

27 September 2020 Quarter-final	Brighton & Hove Albion	2–2 (a.e.t.) (2–4 p)	Birmingham City	Crawley
14:00	Simpkins (yellow card) 21'; Bowman 25' (pen.); A. Whelan (yellow card) 58'; O'Sullivan 89'; K. Green (yellow card) 90+4'	Report	Mayling 5', (yellow card) 37'; M. Green 52' (pen.); Brougham (yellow card) 90+4'	Stadium: Broadfield Stadium; Attendance: Behind-closed-doors; Referee: Rebecca Welch
	Penalties
	K. Green (penalty missed); Le Tissier (penalty scored); Jarrett (penalty scored); Connolly (penalty missed)		(penalty scored) M. Green; (penalty missed) Walker; (penalty scored) Murray; (penalty scored) Mayling; (penalty scored) Brougham
Note: Rescheduled from 15 March 2020

30 September 2020 Semi-final	Birmingham City	0–3	Everton	Solihull
19:15	Scott (yellow card) 29'; Murray (yellow card) 68'	Report	Magill 44'; Sørensen 60'; Gauvin 87'	Stadium: Damson Park; Attendance: Behind-closed-doors; Referee: Amy Fearns

== FA Women's League Cup ==
=== Group stage ===
22 September 2019 Group stage	Birmingham City	1–0	Everton	Solihull
14:00	Williams 73'	Report	Kelly (yellow card) 45+2'; van Es (yellow card) 56'	Stadium: Damson Park; Attendance: 511; Referee: Lucy Oliver

20 October 2019 Group stage	Leicester City	1–5	Birmingham City	Quorn
14:00	Field (yellow card) 13'; Paul 63'; Brown (yellow card) 68'	Report	Williams 15', 57'; Staniforth 33', 80'; Jordan 59'; Scott (yellow card) 62'	Stadium: Farley Way Stadium; Attendance: 368; Referee: Scott Simpson

3 November 2019 Group stage	Manchester City	2–1	Birmingham City	Manchester
14:00	White 50'; Weir 68'	Report	Williams 64'	Stadium: Academy Stadium; Attendance: 1,178; Referee: Elizabeth Simms

11 December 2019 Group stage	Birmingham City	1–3	Manchester United	Solihull
19:30	Grant 35'	Report	Arnot 1'; Ross 27'; A. Turner (yellow card) 84'; Toone 90+3'	Stadium: Damson Park; Attendance: 442; Referee: Helen Conley

Pos	Team	Pld	W	WPEN	LPEN	L	GF	GA	GD	Pts	Qualification	MNU	MCI	BIR	EVE	LEI
1	Manchester United	4	4	0	0	0	19	2	+17	12	Advance to knock-out stage	—	2–0	—	—	11–1
2	Manchester City	4	3	0	0	1	11	4	+7	9	Advance to knock-out stage	—	—	2–1	—	5–0
3	Birmingham City	4	2	0	0	2	8	6	+2	6		1–3	—	—	1–0	—
4	Everton	4	1	0	0	3	5	8	−3	3		0–3	1–4	—	—	—
5	Leicester City	4	0	0	0	4	2	25	−23	0		—	—	1–5	0–4	—

Updated to match(es) played on 11 December 2019. Source: thefa.com
Rules for classification: 1) Points; 2) Goal difference; 3) Number of goals scored; 4) Number of wins; 5) Head-to-head record

== Squad statistics ==
=== Appearances ===
Starting appearances are listed first, followed by substitute appearances after the + symbol where applicable.

No.	Pos	Nat	Player	Total		FA WSL		FA Cup		League Cup	
No.	Pos	Nat	Player	Apps	Goals	Apps	Goals	Apps	Goals	Apps	Goals
1	GK	(England) ENG	Hannah Hampton	18	0	13	0	3	0	2	0
2	MF	(England) ENG	Sarah Mayling	16	1	8+1	0	3+1	1	3	0
3	DF	(Republic of Ireland) IRL	Harriet Scott	19	2	9+2	0	4	2	4	0
6	DF	(England) ENG	Kerys Harrop	11	1	6+1	1	2	0	2	0
7	MF	(Scotland) SCO	Chloe Arthur	17	0	12	0	1	0	3+1	0
8	FW	(England) ENG	Rachel Williams	16	4	9+1	0	1+1	0	3+1	4
10	MF	(United States) USA	Brianna Visalli	13	0	8+1	0	2	0	1+1	0
11	FW	(Scotland) SCO	Abbi Grant	21	3	13	2	2+2	0	4	1
13	GK	(England) ENG	Alexandra Brooks	3	0	0	0	1	0	2	0
14	FW	(England) ENG	Emma Kelly	6	0	1+2	0	3	0	0	0
15	DF	(United States) USA	Adrienne Jordan	18	1	13	0	1	0	4	1
16	DF	(England) ENG	Georgia Brougham	5	0	2	0	2+1	0	0	0
17	MF	(England) ENG	Heidi Logan	0	0	0	0	0	0	0	0
18	MF	(England) ENG	Connie Scofield	14	0	3+6	0	1+1	0	1+2	0
19	MF	(England) ENG	Lucy Whipp	21	1	11+2	1	3+1	0	3+1	0
20	FW	(England) ENG	Claudia Walker	21	0	10+3	0	3+1	0	2+2	0
21	GK	(England) ENG	Imogen Maguire	0	0	0	0	0	0	0	0
22	MF	(England) ENG	Missy Goodwin	0	0	0	0	0	0	0	0
23	DF	(England) ENG	Freya Gregory	4	0	1+2	0	0	0	0+1	0
24	MF	(England) ENG	Olivia Rabjohn	0	0	0	0	0	0	0	0
25	MF	(Northern Ireland) NIR	Rebecca Holloway	18	0	11	0	3	0	4	0
26	DF	(England) ENG	Lily Simkin	6	0	5+1	0	0	0	0	0
27	MF	(England) ENG	Abbey Jones	0	0	0	0	0	0	0	0
28	MF	(England) ENG	Laura Brown	2	0	0+1	0	0	0	0+1	0
29	MF	(England) ENG	Ella Powell	1	0	0	0	0	0	0+1	0
37	MF	(England) ENG	Lucy Staniforth	15	5	10	1	2	2	3	2
Joined during 2020–21 season but competed in the postponed 2019–20 FA Cup:
4	DF	(Scotland) SCO	Rachel Corsie	2	0	0	0	2	0	0	0
8	MF	(England) ENG	Mollie Green	2	1	0	0	2	1	0	0
10	MF	(Scotland) SCO	Christie Murray	2	0	0	0	2	0	0	0
20	DF	(Scotland) SCO	Jamie-Lee Napier	1	0	0	0	0+1	0	0	0
30	DF	(England) ENG	Gemma Lawley	1	0	0	0	1	0	0	0

=== Goalscorers ===
Rank	No.	Pos.	Name	FA WSL	FA Cup	League Cup	Total
1	37	MF	(England) Lucy Staniforth	1	2	2	5
2	8	FW	(England) Rachel Williams	0	0	4	4
3	11	FW	(Scotland) Abbi Grant	2	0	1	3
4	3	DF	(Republic of Ireland) Harriet Scott	0	2	0	2
5	2	MF	(England) Sarah Mayling	0	1	0	1
5	6	DF	(England) Kerys Harrop	1	0	0	1
5	8	MF	(England) Mollie Green (Note: Joined during 2020–21 season but scored in the postponed 2019–20 FA Cup)	0	1	0	1
5	15	DF	(United States) Adrienne Jordan	0	0	1	1
5	19	FW	(England) Lucy Whipp	1	0	0	1
Total				5	6	8	19

== Transfers ==
=== Transfers in ===
Date	Position	Nationality	Name	From	Ref.
3 June 2019	FW	(England)	Claudia Walker	(England) Everton	
2 July 2019	FW	(Scotland)	Abbi Grant	(Belgium) Anderlecht	
18 July 2019	MF	(United States)	Brianna Visalli	(England) West Ham United	
24 July 2019	MF	(Northern Ireland)	Rebecca Holloway	(United States) Cumberland Phoenix	
2 August 2019	FW	(England)	Lucy Whipp	(United States) St. John's Red Storm	
7 August 2019	DF	(United States)	Adrienne Jordan	(Italy) Atalanta	
3 January 2020	FW	(England)	Emma Kelly	(Iceland) ÍBV	

=== Loans in ===
Date	Position	Nationality	Name	From	Until	Ref.
10 January 2020	DF	(England)	Georgia Brougham	(England) Everton	End of season	

=== Transfers out ===
Date	Position	Nationality	Name	To	Ref.
16 May 2019	FW	(England)	Ellen White	(England) Manchester City	
28 May 2019	DF	(England)	Meaghan Sargeant	(England) Bristol City	
28 May 2019	FW	(England)	Charlie Wellings	(England) Bristol City	
5 June 2019	DF	(Wales)	Hayley Ladd	(England) Manchester United	
4 July 2019	DF	(Germany)	Marisa Ewers	(England) Aston Villa	
5 July 2019	FW	(England)	Lucy Quinn	(England) Tottenham Hotspur	
8 July 2019	MF	(England)	Sophie Bramford	(England) Wolverhampton Wanderers	
9 July 2019	DF	(England)	Aoife Mannion	(England) Manchester City	
19 July 2019	FW	(England)	Shania Hayles	(England) Aston Villa	
19 July 2019	DF	(England)	Paige Williams	Retired	
1 August 2019	MF	(England)	Emma Follis	(England) Aston Villa	
