= Lily Simkin =

English footballer (born 2003)

Personal information
- Full name: Lily Simkin
- Date of birth: 9 September 2003 (age 23)
- Place of birth: Walsall, England
- Position: Defender

Team information
- Current team: Wolverhampton Wanderers
- Number: 6

Youth career
- 2014–2019: Birmingham City

Senior career*
Years	Team	Apps	(Gls)
2019–2023	Birmingham City	13	(0)
2025–	Wolverhampton Wanderers		

International career
- England U15
2019	England U17		
- * Club domestic league appearances and goals as of 23 April 2023

Lily Simkin (born 9 September 2003) is an English professional footballer who plays as a defender for Women's Super League 2 club Wolverhampton Wanderers. She previously played for Birmingham City.

== Early life ==
Lily Simkin was born on 9 September 2003 in Walsall to parents Catherine and Darren. She has an older brother. Her father, Darren Simkin, is a former professional footballer best known for playing with Wolverhampton Wanderers and Shrewsbury Town.

Simkin attended Landywood Primary School in Great Wyrley, Staffordshire.

== Youth career ==
Simkin began playing football at local club Wyrley Juniors, a sister club of Birmingham City, age 5. She played for the side in both boy's and girl's teams up to the under-12 level. Simkin began playign with Birmingham City's academy when she was ten.

== Club career ==
=== Birmingham City, 2019–23 ===
On 17 November 2019, Simkin, age 16, made her senior first-team debut for Birmingham City as a 62nd-minute substitute for Freya Gregory in Birmingham City's 3–0 defeat to Brighton & Hove Albion. She started the next match, a 6–0 defeat to eventual league champions Chelsea. Simkin was released by Birmingham City in the summer of 2023.

=== Professional career break, 2023–25 ===
Following her release from Birmingham, Simkin has stated she successfully trialled with a Women's Championship club and was set to sign a contract. However, during a pre–season friendly, Simkin suffered an injury to her anterior cruciate ligament in which the ligament was torn from her femur. She underwent surgery on 18 October 2023.

Without a club, Simkin completed part of her injury rehabilitation with Nottingham Forest.

=== Wolverhampton Wanderers, 2025– ===
On 2 February 2025, Simkin joined Women's National League North side Wolverhampton Wanderers; her father had played for the club in the 1990s. She made her first start for the club on 13 February 2025 during a 4–0 victory over Sporting Khalsa. On 21 March 2025, Wolves announced that Simkin had suffered another ACL injury. In April 2025, Simkin was one of a number of Wolves players to speak out after it was revealed that—despite coming close to winning the league—the club had chosen not to submit their application to play in the Women's Championship (now known as the Women's Super League 2).

Following the conclusion of the 2025–26 season, Wolves were promoted to the Women's Super League 2 (WSL 2). On 5 June 2026, it was announced that Simkin would remain with Wolves to continue her injury rehabilitation.

== International career ==
Simkin represented England at the under-15 and under-17 level.

== Personal life ==
Simkin and former Birmingham City teammate Hannah Hampton are close friends.

== Career statistics ==
=== Club ===
As of match played 24 January 2021.

Appearances and goals by club, season and competition
Club	Season	League			FA Cup		League Cup		Total	
Club	Season	Division	Apps	Goals	Apps	Goals	Apps	Goals	Apps	Goals
Birmingham City	2019–20	FA WSL	6	0	0	0	0	0	6	0
Birmingham City	2020–21	FA WSL	0	0	0	0	0	0	0	0
Career total			6	0	0	0	0	0	6	0
