= Connie Scofield =

Northern Irish footballer (born 1999)

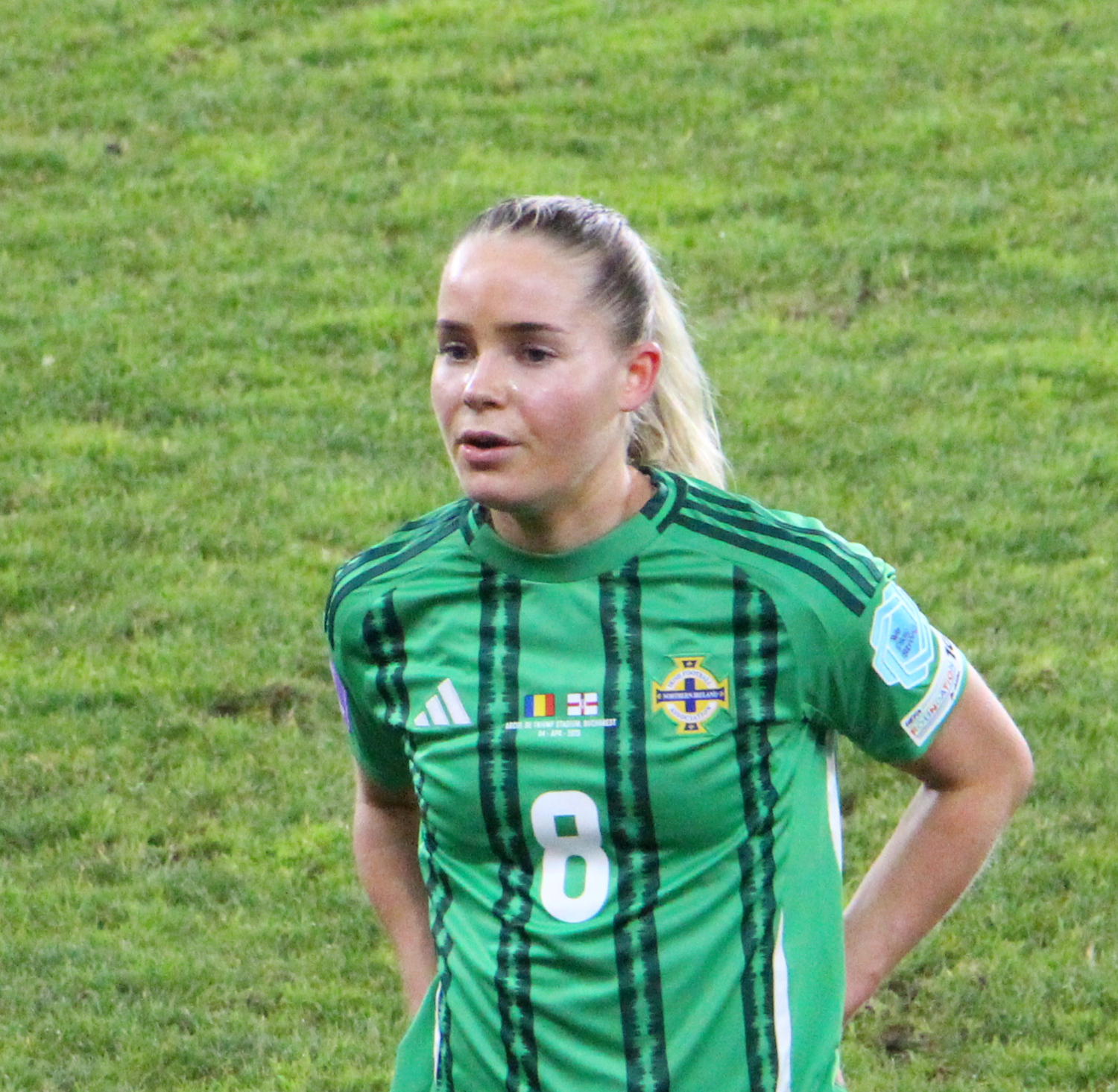
- Scofield with Northern Ireland in 2025

Personal information
- Full name: Constance May Scofield
- Date of birth: 26 May 1999 (age 27)
- Place of birth: London, England
- Height: 1.63 m (5 ft 4 in)
- Position: Midfielder

Youth career
- –2015: Birmingham City

Senior career*
Years	Team	Apps	(Gls)
2015–2021	Birmingham City	29	(1)
2021–2023	Leicester City	3	(0)
2023	→ Coventry United (loan)	8	(0)
2023–2025	London City Lionesses	22	(1)
2025	→ Sheffield United (loan)	7	(0)
2025-	Sheffield United	4	(0)

International career^{‡}
2016	England U17	4	(0)
2018	England U19	4	(0)
2019	England U21	7	(1)
2024–	Northern Ireland	7	(0)
- * Club domestic league appearances and goals as of 12 January 2026 ‡ National team caps and goals as of 24 April 2025

Constance May "Connie" Scofield (born 26 May 1999) is a professional footballer who plays as a midfielder for the Northern Ireland national team. She previously played for Birmingham City and is a product of Blues Ladies development centre which she joined at age nine. Born in England, which Scofield represented at youth international levels, she pledged her senior allegiance to Northern Ireland in 2024.

== Career statistics ==
=== Club ===
As of 12 Jan 2026

Appearances and goals by club, season and competition
Club	Season	League			League Cup		FA Cup		Total	
Club	Season	Division	Apps	Goals	Apps	Goals	Apps	Goals	Apps	Goals
Birmingham City	2016	FA WSL	2	0	1	0	0	0	3	0
Birmingham City	2017	FA WSL	0	0	0	0	0	0	0	0
Birmingham City	2017–18	FA WSL	0	0	2	0	0	0	2	0
Birmingham City	2018–19	FA WSL	10	1	4	0	0	0	14	1
Birmingham City	2019–20	FA WSL	9	0	4	0	1	0	14	0
Birmingham City	2020–21	FA WSL	8	0	2	0	0	0	10	0
Birmingham City	Total		29	1	13	0	1	0	43	1
Leicester City	2021–22	WSL	1	0	0	0	1	0	2	0
Leicester City	2022–23	WSL	2	0	2	1	0	0	4	0
Leicester City	Total		3	0	2	1	1	0	6	1
Coventry United (loan)	2022-23	Women's Championship	8	0	0	0	1	0	9	0
London City Lionesses	2023-24	Women's Championship	16	1	3	0	2	0	21	1
London City Lionesses	2024-25	Women's Championship	6	0	3	0	0	0	9	0
London City Lionesses	Total		22	1	6	0	2	0	30	1
Sheffield United (loan)	2024-25	Women's Championship	7	0	0	0	0	0	7	0
Sheffield United	2025-26	WSL 2	0	0	0	0	0	0	0	0
Sheffield United	Total		7	0	0	0	0	0	7	0
Career total			69	2	21	1	5	0	95	3
