= Lucy Whipp =

English footballer

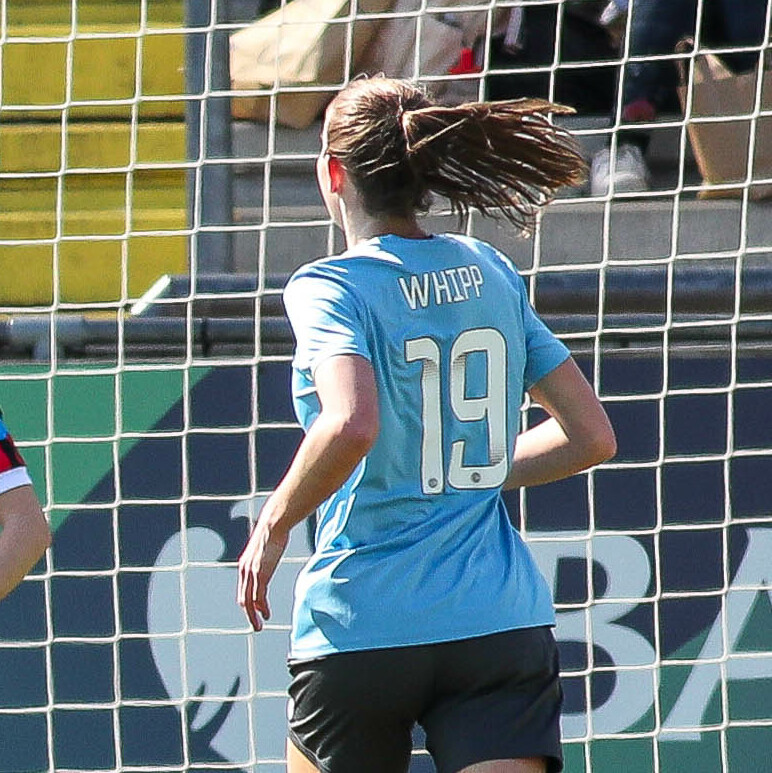
- in 2023

Personal information
- Full name: Lucy Whipp
- Date of birth: 12 November 1995 (age 31)
- Place of birth: Ormskirk, England
- Height: 5 ft 6 in (1.68 m)
- Position: Midfielder

Team information
- Current team: Rugby Borough
- Number: 19

Youth career
- 2008–2013: Everton

College career
Years	Team	Apps	(Gls)
2015–2018	St. John's Red Storm	77	(9)

Senior career*
Years	Team	Apps	(Gls)
2013–2014	Everton	15	(1)
2019–2022	Birmingham City	37	(1)
2023–	Rugby Borough	0	(0)

International career^{‡}
2011–2012	England U17	7	(0)
- * Club domestic league appearances and goals as of 13 October 2021 ‡ National team caps and goals as of 18 April 2012

Lucy Whipp (born 12 November 1995) is an English footballer who plays as a midfielder for FA Women's National League South club Rugby Borough.

== Club career ==
=== Everton ===
Whipp joined the Everton academy aged 12. She was promoted to the first team in 2013, playing two seasons in the FA WSL before the team was relegated at the end of the 2014 season. On 1 June 2014, Whipp was part of the Everton squad that played in the FA Cup final, appearing as a 71st minute substitute in a 2–0 defeat to Arsenal.

=== St. John's Red Storm ===
In 2015, Whipp moved to the United States in order to combine her football career with pursuing higher education, enrolling at St. John's University in New York City. She spent four seasons playing college soccer for NCAA Division I team St. John's Red Storm in the Big East Conference and was named to the conference All-Rookie Team in her first year.

=== Birmingham City ===
Whipp returned to England after graduating in summer 2019, signing with FA WSL club Birmingham City. On 8 September 2019, Whipp made her Birmingham debut starting in the season opener, a 1–0 loss to former-club Everton. Whipp scored her first goal for the club on 8 December 2019, opening the scoring in a 2–0 win over Bristol City.

=== Coventry United ===
In January 2023, Whipp joined Women's Championship club Coventry United.

== Career statistics ==
=== Club ===
As of match played 13 October 2021.

Appearances and goals by club, season and competition
Club	Season	League			FA Cup		League Cup		Total	
Club	Season	Division	Apps	Goals	Apps	Goals	Apps	Goals	Apps	Goals
Everton	2013	WSL 1	6	0	0	0	2	0	8	0
Everton	2014	WSL 1	9	1	3	0	3	0	15	1
Everton	Total		15	1	3	0	5	0	23	1
Birmingham City	2019–20	FA WSL	13	1	4	0	4	0	21	1
Birmingham City	2020–21	FA WSL	20	0	3	0	1	0	24	0
Birmingham City	2021–22	FA WSL	4	0	0	0	1	0	5	0
Birmingham City	Total		37	1	7	0	6	0	50	1
Career total			52	2	10	0	11	0	73	2
