= Rebecca Holloway =

English footballer (born 1995)

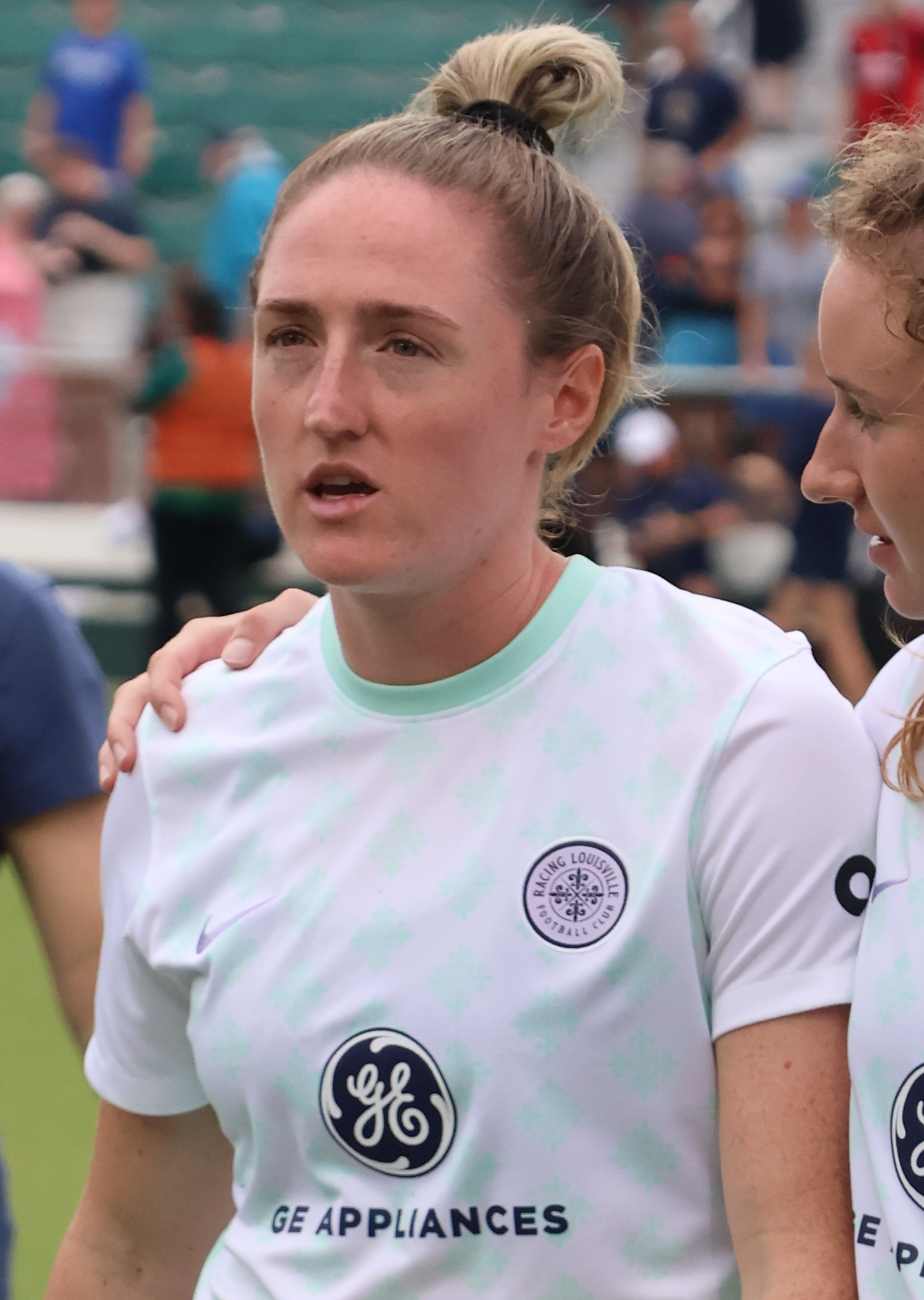
- Holloway with Racing Louisville FC in 2023

Personal information
- Full name: Rebecca Rayne Holloway
- Date of birth: 25 August 1995 (age 31)
- Place of birth: Nailsea, England
- Height: 5 ft 6 in (1.68 m)
- Positions: Midfielder; defender

Team information
- Current team: Birmingham City W.F.C.
- Number: 15

Youth career
- Clevedon Town
- Bristol City Academy

College career
Years	Team	Apps	(Gls)
2015–2018	Cumberland Phoenix	77	(40)

Senior career*
Years	Team	Apps	(Gls)
2019	Nashville Rhythm	11	(1)
2019–2022	Birmingham City	59	(0)
2022–2023	Racing Louisville	18	(0)
2023–	Birmingham City	11	(0)

International career^{‡}
2012–2013	Northern Ireland U19	8	(0)
2019–	Northern Ireland	42	(3)
- * Club domestic league appearances and goals as of 30 March 2022 ‡ National team caps and goals as of 18 October 2026

Rebecca Rayne Holloway (born 25 August 1995) is a professional footballer who plays as a defender for Women's Super League club Birmingham City and the Northern Ireland national team.

== Early life ==
Born in Nailsea, North Somerset, Holloway started playing football at the age of five for local side Nailsea Boys before moving on to Clevedon Town and eventually Bristol City Academy where she was coached by future England manager Mark Sampson.

=== Cumberland Phoenix ===
In 2015, Holloway moved to the United States to study and play college soccer at Cumberland University. She played four seasons for NAIA team Cumberland Phoenix, notably earning Mid-South Conference First-Team selection in three straight years and was named back to back Mid-South Conference Player of the Year in 2017 and 2018. As a senior, Holloway led the league in goals with 22.

== Club career ==
=== Nashville Rhythm ===
In 2019, Holloway played for semi-professional WPSL team Nashville Rhythm. She made 11 appearances, scoring one goal as Nashville finished second in the Southeast Conference.

=== Birmingham City ===
On 24 July 2019, Holloway returned to England to sign with FA WSL team Birmingham City. On 19 July 2021, Holloway signed a contract extension at Birmingham for the 2021–22 season.

=== Racing Louisville ===
On 31 March 2022, Racing Louisville paid a transfer fee to purchase Holloway, signing her to a two-year contract.

Holloway made nine total appearances, starting in five, in the 2023 season. On 2 September 2023 she got her first assist for Racing Louisville, helping Thembi Kgatlana’s game-winner for the club’s first ever victory over Portland Thorns.

Her Racing Louisville contract expired in November 2023.

=== Birmingham City ===
Holloway returned to Birmingham, signing for the club in January 2024. On 14 July 2025, it was announced that she had signed a two-year contract extension.

== International career ==
Holloway represented Northern Ireland at under-19 level. She received several invitations to senior women's squad training camps, however her studies in the USA prevented her from attending.

In August 2019, Holloway was named to the senior team for UEFA Euro 2021 qualifying matches against Norway and Wales but was an unused substitute in both. Having removed herself from the national team fold to focus on her mental health, Holloway eventually made her senior international debut on 9 April 2021, against Ukraine in the Euro 2022 qualifying play-offs. She played the full 90 minutes of both legs stepping in for injured long-term left-back Demi Vance as Northern Ireland won 4–1 on aggregate, qualifying the team for the Euro 2022. It was the first time Northern Ireland had qualified for a major international tournament.

Holloway was part of the squad that was called up to the UEFA Women's Euro 2022. At the Euro 2022, she played in all three group stage games, starting twice and coming on as a substitute once.

== Personal life ==
Holloway is dating fellow Birmingham City teammate and Republic of Ireland forward Lucy Quinn.

In December 2023, Holloway discussed her mental health problems.

== Career statistics ==
=== Club ===
As of match played 30 March 2022.

Club	Season	League			National Cup (Note: Includes the Women's FA Cup)		League Cup (Note: Includes the FA Women's League Cup and NWSL Challenge Cup)		Playoffs		Total	
Club	Season	Division	Apps	Goals	Apps	Goals	Apps	Goals	Apps	Goals	Apps	Goals
Nashville Rhythm	2019	WPSL	11	1	—		—		—		11	1
Birmingham City	2019–20	FA WSL	11	0	3	0	4	0	—		18	0
Birmingham City	2020–21	FA WSL	21	0	3	0	2	0	—		26	0
Birmingham City	2021–22	FA WSL	17	0	2	0	2	0	—		21	0
Birmingham City	Total		49	0	8	0	8	0	0	0	65	0
Racing Louisville	2022	NWSL	0	0	—		0	0	—		0	0
Career total			60	1	8	0	8	0	0	0	76	1

=== International ===
Statistics accurate as of match played 23 February 2022.

Year	Northern Ireland	
Year	Apps	Goals
2021	7	3
2022	3	0
Total	10	3

==== International goals ====
As of match played 29 November 2021. Northern Ireland score listed first, score column indicates score after each Holloway goal.

No.	Date	Venue	Opponent	Score	Result	Competition
1	25 November 2021	Petar Miloševski Training Centre, Skopje, North Macedonia	North Macedonia	11–0	11–0	2023 World Cup qualifying
2	29 November 2021	Seaview, Belfast, Northern Ireland	North Macedonia	2–0	9–0	2023 World Cup qualifying
3	29 November 2021	Seaview, Belfast, Northern Ireland	North Macedonia	6–0	9–0	2023 World Cup qualifying

== Honors ==
Cumberland Phoenix

- Mid-South Conference Regular Season Champions: 2017

Birmingham City

- Women's Super League 2: 2025–26

Individual

- Mid-South Conference Player of the Year: 2017, 2018
