= Hannah Hampton =

English footballer (born 2000)

Hannah Hampton MBE
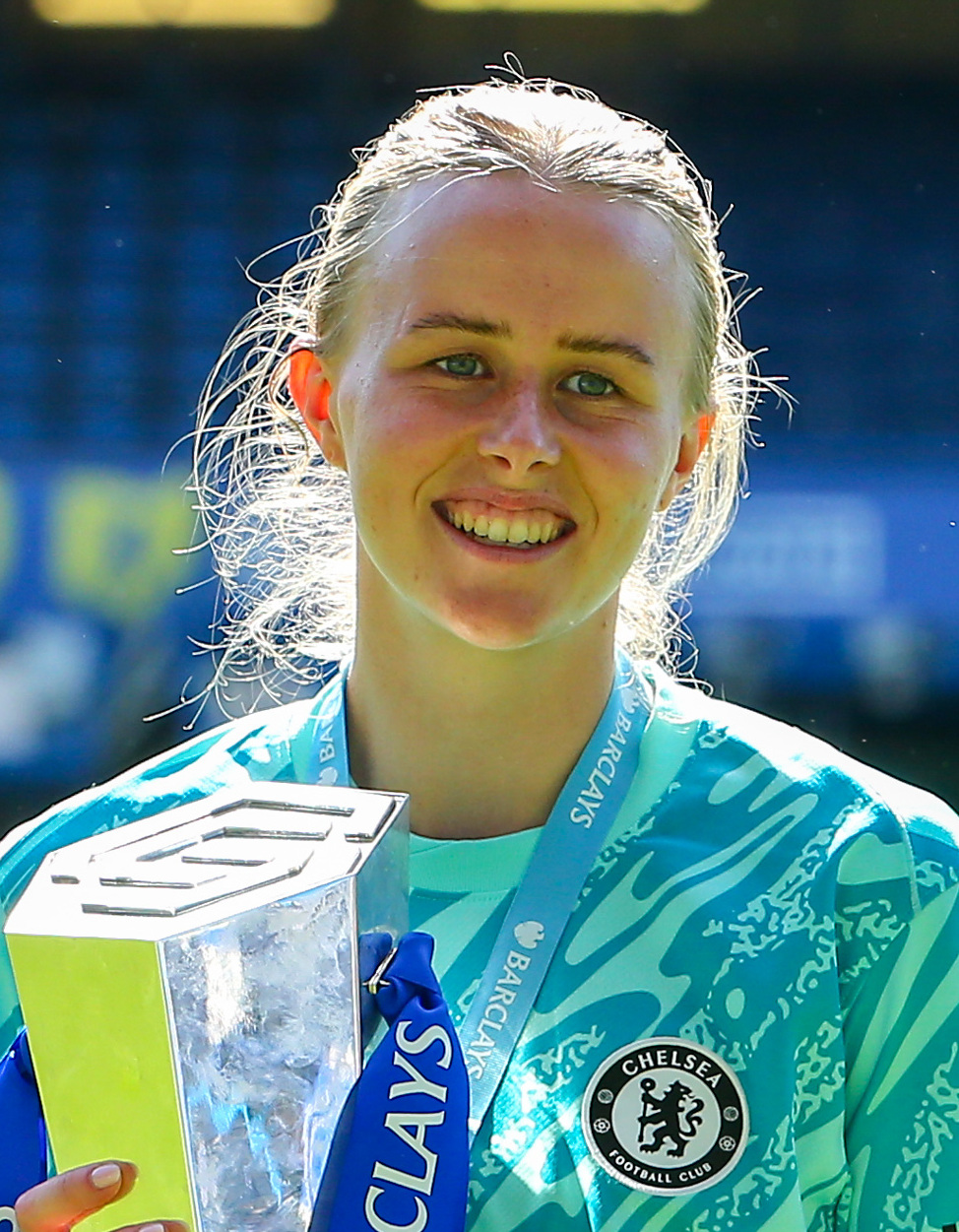
- Hampton in 2025

Personal information
- Full name: Hannah Alice Hampton
- Date of birth: 16 November 2000 (age 26)
- Place of birth: Birmingham, England
- Height: 5 ft 9 in (1.75 m)
- Position: Goalkeeper

Team information
- Current team: Chelsea
- Number: 24

Youth career
- 2005–2010: Villarreal CF
- 2010–2016: Stoke City
- 2016–2017: Birmingham City

Senior career*
| Years | Team | Apps | (Gls) |
| 2017–2021 | Birmingham City | 50 | (0) |
| 2021–2023 | Aston Villa | 35 | (0) |
| 2023– | Chelsea | 61 | (0) |

International career^{‡}
| 2016–2017 | England U17 | 6 | (0) |
| 2019 | England U19 | 10 | (0) |
| 2019–2020 | England U21 | 3 | (0) |
| 2022– | England | 31 | (0) |
Medal record
Women's football
Representing England
UEFA Women's Championship
| Winner | 2022 England |
| Winner | 2025 Switzerland |
UEFA–CONMEBOL Finalissima
| Winner | 2023 England |
FIFA Women's World Cup
| Runner-up | 2023 Australia and New Zealand |
- * Club domestic league appearances and goals as of 21 November 2026 ‡ National team caps and goals as of 13 October 2026

Hannah Alice Hampton MBE (born 16 November 2000) is an English professional footballer who plays as a goalkeeper for Women's Super League club Chelsea and the England national team. She progressed through the Stoke City and Birmingham City academies, spent five years in Spain with the Villarreal CF youth team, and previously played for Aston Villa.

== Early life and career ==
Hampton was born in Birmingham, England and grew up in Studley, Warwickshire before emigrating to Spain with her family at the age of five. She has an older brother, Ben, who she credits with helping her to ‘‘achieve [her] dreams’’.

While in Spain, Hampton was scouted for the Villarreal CF academy where she played as a striker. She studied at the British School of Vila-real where her parents, Chris and Laura, worked as teachers.

The family moved back to England in 2010, and Hampton joined the Stoke City Centre of Excellence. During her time at Stoke's academy, she switched from playing as a forward to being a goalkeeper.

Hampton attended Chase Grammar School in Cannock and Erasmus Darwin Academy in Burntwood, Staffordshire where her parents were members of staff. As part of the "Where Greatness Is Made" campaign, a plaque honouring Hampton was installed at Stoke City.

== Club career ==
=== Birmingham City ===
In 2016, Hampton was recruited for the Birmingham City Centre of Excellence by then-Academy Director Marc Skinner, who would later be appointed first-team manager. On 5 November 2017, Skinner called Hampton up for her senior debut in a League Cup group game against Doncaster Belles. After making a string of first-team appearances, Hampton signed her first professional contract with the club on 5 December 2018.

In 2018, veteran first-choice keeper Ann-Katrin Berger left the club, and Hampton's playing time increased. She started 12 of the 20 WSL matches during the 2018–19 season as the Blues conceded a joint-third low 17 league goals. She was named the club's Young Player of the Season at Birmingham's end of season awards in May 2019.

Hampton signed a new contract for Birmingham City on 5 September 2019, extending her time at the club until June 2021. She played 34 of the 35 WSL games in the next two seasons, keeping 6 clean sheets with a 66.5% save percentage. Hampton left Birmingham upon the expiry of her contract at the end of the 2020–21 season.

=== Aston Villa ===
On 3 July 2021, Hampton signed a two-year contract with rival WSL team Aston Villa on a free transfer.

=== Chelsea ===
On 4 July 2023, Chelsea announced the signing of Hampton on a three-year contract following the end of her contract with Aston Villa. She made her Chelsea debut on 17 December 2023 against Bristol City, where she was praised for her saves in the 3–0 away victory for Chelsea, and became the first choice goalkeeper ahead of Zećira Mušović in the 2023–24 season.

In the 2024–25 season, Hampton kept 13 clean sheets in 22 league appearances for Chelsea as they became the first WSL team to finish a 22-game season unbeaten. As a result, she shared the season's Golden Glove award with Manchester United's Phallon Tullis-Joyce.

On 8 November 2025, Hampton suffered a quad injury in Chelsea's draw against Arsenal. She returned to the team's starting eleven in January 2026, keeping a clean-sheet during a 5–0 victory over West Ham. Hampton was once again named the Golden Glove winner for the 2025–26 season, having kept eight clean sheets in 18 games (one more than both Tullis-Joyce and Manchester City's Ayaka Yamashita).

In July 2026, Hampton signed a new contract with the club, extending her tenure by a further two years.

== International career ==
=== Youth ===
In February 2013, Hampton received her first call-up to the under-15 squad at the age of 12. She was included in the under-17 squad for the 2017 UEFA Women's Under-17 Championship qualification playing host to Lithuania, Slovenia and Russia. The side progressed to the Elite Round, beating Germany and Poland, and drawing to Italy to top the group to qualify for Euro Finals in Czech Republic. England were drawn against Republic Of Ireland, Netherlands and Norway but only won one of their three ties, finishing third and failing to progress beyond the group stage.

Hampton continued to progress through the under-18 and under-19 age groups. In 2018 she was included in the under-19 squad that contested both the qualifying and elite qualifying rounds, booking their place at 2019 UEFA Women's Under-19 Championship. Hampton recorded two clean sheets in two appearances against Sweden and Italy in the Elite Round at St George's Park National Football Centre and was named Player of the Match against Italy. During the tournament, Hampton played in all three of England's group games as they failed to progress.

In August 2019, Hampton received her first call-up to the under-21 team by Rehanne Skinner to compete in the friendly invitational U23 Nordic Tournament which was hosted at Loughborough University.

=== Senior ===
==== Senior debut and Euro 2022 ====
In February 2020, Hampton was called-up to the England senior team for the first time, as a training player in the travelling party for the 2020 SheBelieves Cup. In September that year, she received her first full call-up to a training squad. On 12 October 2021, Hampton received her first competitive call-up for England's 2023 FIFA World Cup qualifying games against Northern Ireland and Latvia. On 20 February 2022, Hampton made her senior England debut starting England's 0–0 draw with Spain in the 2022 Arnold Clark Cup. Hampton was an unused substitute in the England squad which won the UEFA Women's Euro 2022 in July 2022.

In November 2022, Hampton's England legacy number – 222 – was announced.

==== Return to the squad ====
On 31 May 2023, Hampton was named to the squad for the 2023 FIFA Women's World Cup in July 2023, where England would place as runners-up in the tournament.

On 9 April 2024, Hampton began featuring in the starting lineup for Euro 2025 qualifying matches, keeping a clean sheet in a 2–0 victory over the Republic of Ireland. This marked first competitive start for over two years. After an injury to Mary Earps, she came on as a substitute in the 2–1 defeat to France on 31 May. Hampton again started as the no.1 for the return fixture against France on 4 June, making a ‘‘stunning’’ fingertip save in the 89th minute to help England secure 3 points, followed by starting the 2–1 win over the Republic of Ireland on 12 July.

==== Securing the no. 1 position and Euro 2025 ====
After being included in the starting eleven for the final qualifying match against Sweden, sports writer Suzanne Wrack opined that Hampton's selection ‘‘perhaps marks a changing of the guard’’ in reference to England's first choice goalkeeper, describing the decision for Hampton to be selected ahead of Earps as a ‘‘a bold move and a huge vote of confidence.’’ England manager Sarina Wiegman commented it was a ‘‘little bit too early’’ to confirm if the change would be decisive, while The Guardian described it as ‘‘the strongest signal yet’’ that Hampton would secure the starting position for Euro 2025. On 8 April 2025, Wiegman further commented that Hampton was ‘‘a little bit ahead’’ of Earps to become England's first choice goalkeeper for the tournament.

Following Earps' international retirement in May 2025, Hampton was the only goalkeeper named in the squad for Euro 2025 to have made a senior appearance for England prior to the tournament. She was named Player of the Match in England's quarter-final victory over Sweden, which they won after a penalty shoot-out. Hampton made two saves in regular time and then made two further saves in the penalty shoot-out, despite suffering a nosebleed which left her with an absorbent in her nostril.

Hampton started in the tournament's final on 27 July 2025, and saved the shots of Mariona Caldentey and Ballon d'Or winner Aitana Bonmatí in the penalty shootout, as England beat Spain to win their second consecutive European title. Her shot-stopping individual performances throughout the tournament brought her particular praise, and she was named the Player of the Match in the final. Of her performance in the final, manager Sarina Wiegman said ‘‘You really have to step up and show it and so did she. I think she's done amazing.’’ After the tournament, Hampton revealed via her Instagram that her grandfather died two days before the tournament began.

Hampton was voted as BBC Women's Footballer of the Year for 2025, following her key performances for both Chelsea and England to win the WSL and 2025 Euros.

==== Post-Euro 2025 and pathway to World Cup 2027 ====
Following England's Euros victory, Hampton was called up for the October friendlies against Brazil and Australia. It was later revealed that Hampton would miss the first match, due to an elbow injury, meaning that uncapped Khiara Keating would make her senior international debut.

As part of England's 2027 World Cup qualifying campaign, Hampton made a series of important saves in a 1–0 win over Iceland on 18 April 2026, in what was the Lionesses' 500th fixture.

== Off the pitch ==
=== In culture and the media ===
In October 2025, as part of a press tour for her autobiography, former England goalkeeper Mary Earps claimed she felt manager Sarina Wiegman had ‘‘rewarded bad behaviour’’ by recalling Hampton to the squad ahead of the 2023 Women's World Cup, having previously dropped her for concerns around her attitude. Days later, Chelsea boss Sonia Bompastor spoke in support of Hampton's ‘‘class’’, stating that ‘‘the fact she was even able to play... shows how good she is.’’ A number of former Lionesses – including all-time top goalscorer Ellen White and leading appearance maker Fara Williams – expressed concern over the way Earps had handled the situation. In February 2026, Earps spoke about the backlash surrounding her comments, stating she took ‘‘full responsibility and accountability for the book, the decisions, and how it landed.’’

In June 2026, Hampton was awarded an MBE for services to football as part of the King's Birthday Honours.

=== Personal life ===
Hampton was born with strabismus, an eye condition that affects depth perception. By the age of three she had undergone three operations at Birmingham Children's Hospital to try and correct it and is now an ambassador for the hospital.

As well as English, she speaks fluent Spanish and also knows sign language. She is a West Bromwich Albion supporter.

== Career statistics ==
=== Club ===
As of match played 21 November 2026

Appearances and goals by club, season and competition
| Club | Season | League | | | FA Cup | | League Cup | | Europe | | Total | |
| Club | Season | Division | Apps | Goals | Apps | Goals | Apps | Goals | Apps | Goals | Apps | Goals |
|---|---|---|---|---|---|---|---|---|---|---|---|---|
| Birmingham City | 2017–18 | Women's Super League | 4 | 0 | 0 | 0 | 2 | 0 | — | | 6 | 0 |
| Birmingham City | 2018–19 | Women's Super League | 12 | 0 | 2 | 0 | 3 | 0 | — | | 17 | 0 |
| Birmingham City | 2019–20 | Women's Super League | 13 | 0 | 3 | 0 | 2 | 0 | — | | 18 | 0 |
| Birmingham City | 2020–21 | Women's Super League | 21 | 0 | 1 | 0 | 1 | 0 | — | | 23 | 0 |
| Birmingham City | Total | | 50 | 0 | 6 | 0 | 8 | 0 | — | | 64 | 0 |
| Aston Villa | 2021–22 | Women's Super League | 20 | 0 | 1 | 0 | 1 | 0 | — | | 22 | 0 |
| Aston Villa | 2022–23 | Women's Super League | 15 | 0 | 4 | 0 | 2 | 0 | — | | 21 | 0 |
| Aston Villa | Total | | 35 | 0 | 5 | 0 | 3 | 0 | — | | 43 | 0 |
| Chelsea | 2023–24 | Women's Super League | 10 | 0 | 2 | 0 | 2 | 0 | 4 | 0 | 18 | 0 |
| Chelsea | 2024–25 | Women's Super League | 22 | 0 | 5 | 0 | 2 | 0 | 5 | 0 | 34 | 0 |
| Chelsea | 2025–26 | Women's Super League | 18 | 0 | 4 | 0 | 2 | 0 | 3 | 0 | 27 | 0 |
| Chelsea | 2026–27 | Women's Super League | 11 | 0 | 0 | 0 | — | | 5 | 0 | 16 | 0 |
| Chelsea | Total | | 61 | 0 | 11 | 0 | 6 | 0 | 17 | 0 | 95 | 0 |
| Career total | | | 146 | 0 | 22 | 0 | 17 | 0 | 17 | 0 | 202 | 0 |

=== International ===
As of match played 13 October 2026.

Appearances and goals by national team and year
| National team | Year | Apps | Goals |
|---|---|---|---|
| England | 2022 | 2 | 0 |
| England | 2024 | 8 | 0 |
| England | 2025 | 13 | 0 |
| England | 2026 | 8 | 0 |
| Total | | 31 | 0 |

== Honours ==
Chelsea

- Women's Super League: 2023–24, 2024–25
- Women's FA Cup: 2024–25
- FA Women's League Cup: 2024–25, 2025–26

England

- FIFA Women's World Cup runner-up: 2023
- UEFA Women's Championship: 2022, 2025
- Women's Finalissima: 2023
- Arnold Clark Cup: 2022

Individual

- Birmingham City Young Player of the Season: 2018–19
- Birmingham City Player of the Season: 2020–21
- Freedom of the City of London (announced 1 August 2022)
- Women's Super League Golden Glove: 2024–25, 2025–26
- UEFA Women's Championship Team of the Tournament: 2025
- PFA WSL Team of the Year: 2025–26
- Yashin Trophy: 2025
- BBC Women's Footballer of the Year: 2025
- The Best FIFA Women's Goalkeeper: 2025
- IFFHS Women's World's Best Goalkeeper:2025
- IFFHS Women's World 11:2025
- FIFA FIFPRO Women's World 11: 2025, 2026
- IAPB Love your eyes special recognition award: 2025
- UEFA Women's Championship goal keeper of the Tournament: 2025
- Glamour woman of the year : 2025
- MBE in the 2026 King's Birthday Honours
