= Chloe McCarron =

Northern Irish footballer

Personal information
- Full name: Chloe McCarron
- Date of birth: 22 December 1997 (age 28)
- Place of birth: Coleraine, Northern Ireland
- Height: 1.70 m (5 ft 7 in)
- Position: Midfielder

Team information
- Current team: Glentoran
- Number: 97

Senior career*
Years	Team	Apps	(Gls)
–2017	Mid-Ulster		
2017–2020	Linfield		
2020–2021	Birmingham City	10	(0)
2021–	Glentoran	0	(0)

International career^{‡}
2013–14	Northern Ireland U17	11	(2)
2014–16	Northern Ireland U19	11	(0)
2017–	Northern Ireland	23	(1)
- * Club domestic league appearances and goals as of 23 April 2021 ‡ National team caps and goals as of 22:55, 13 July 2022 (UTC)

Chloe McCarron (born 22 December 1997) is a Northern Irish professional footballer who plays as a midfielder for Northern Ireland. She previously played for Mid-Ulster, Linfield Ladies and Birmingham City, before signing for Glentoran in July 2021

McCarron currently has 12 caps for Northern Ireland, scoring 1 goal.

== Club career ==
In August 2020, McCarron signed a two-year contract with English FA WSL side Birmingham City. She made 12 appearances in all competitions before mutually terminating her contract in April 2021 in order to return to Northern Ireland for personal reasons.

== International career ==
McCarron has been capped for the Northern Ireland national team, appearing for the team during the 2019 FIFA Women's World Cup qualifying cycle.

McCarron was part of the squad that was called up to the UEFA Women's Euro 2022.

== Career statistics ==
=== Club ===
As of 23 April 2021.

Appearances and goals by club, season and competition
Club	Season	League			FA Cup		League Cup		Total	
Club	Season	Division	Apps	Goals	Apps	Goals	Apps	Goals	Apps	Goals
Birmingham City	2020–21	FA WSL	10	0	0	0	2	0	12	0
Career total			10	0	0	0	2	0	12	0

=== International ===
As of 3 February 2021

Appearances and goals by national team and year
National team	Year	Apps	Goals
Northern Ireland	2017	1	0
Northern Ireland	2018	0	0
Northern Ireland	2019	4	0
Northern Ireland	2020	6	1
Total		11	1

As of goal scored on 1 December 2020
Scores and results list Northern Ireland's goal tally first, score column indicates score after each McCarron goal.

List of international goals scored by Chloe McCarron
No.	Date	Venue	Opponent	Score	Result	Competition	Ref.
1	1 December 2020	Seaview, Belfast, Northern Ireland	Faroe Islands	3–1	5–1	UEFA Euro 2022 qualifying	
