= Harriet Scott (footballer) =

Irish footballer (born 1993)

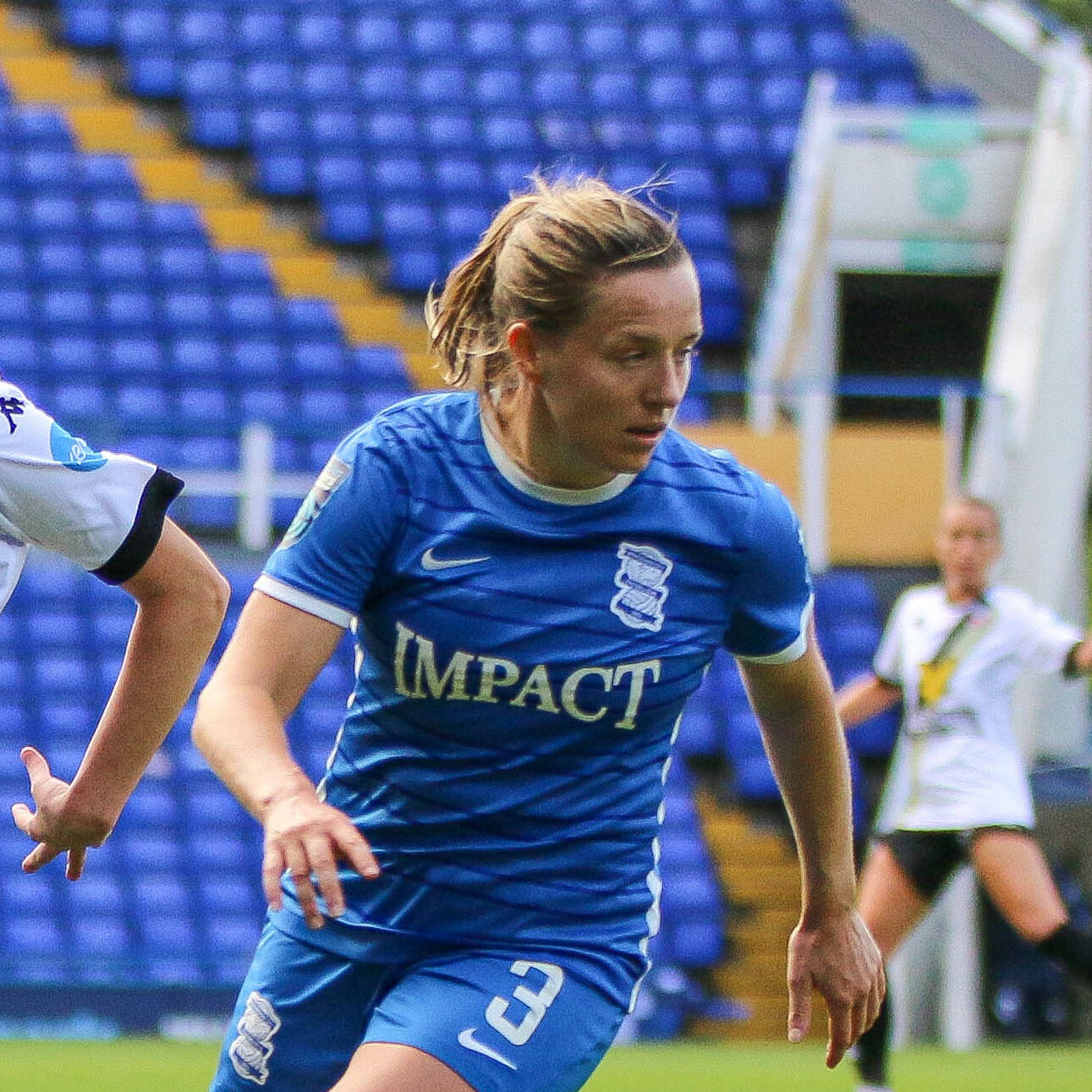

Personal information
- Full name: Harriet Archer Scott
- Date of birth: 10 February 1993 (age 33)
- Place of birth: Reading, England
- Height: 1.62 m (5 ft 4 in)
- Position: Defender

Youth career
- Caversham
- Reading

Senior career*
Years	Team	Apps	(Gls)
2009–2018	Reading	24	(0)
2018–2023	Birmingham City	85	(1)

International career^{‡}
2017–2023	Republic of Ireland	23	(0)
- * Club domestic league appearances and goals as of 8 May 2022 ‡ National team caps and goals as of 6 September 2022

Harriet Archer Scott (born 10 February 1993) is a doctor and a former professional footballer who played as a defender for Reading, Birmingham City, and the Republic of Ireland national team. She was named Women's International Player of the Year by the Football Association of Ireland in 2018. A combative left-back, Scott joined Reading at youth level and remained with the Berkshire club when they were promoted into the FA Women's Super League in 2015.

== Club career ==
Scott joined her local club Reading as an eight-year-old and progressed through the club's youth system to debut in the first team as a 16-year-old. She spent some time out of football due to her studies, before returning to Reading and helping them secure promotion to the top-flight FA Women's Super League in 2015.

Scott signed a full-time professional contract with Reading in January 2016. She made seven appearances during the 2016 FA WSL season. Reading finished in eighth place with a 1–9–6 record. After signing a new contract with Reading for the 2017 FA WSL season, Scott made eight appearances during the regular season. The team finished in sixth place with a 2–4–2 record.

After leaving Reading, Scott agreed to join Birmingham City ahead of the 2018–19 FA WSL season. In her first season she was an important player for The Blues as they performed better than expected, compiling a 13–6–1 record to finish fourth in the League. She signed a new two-year contract with Birmingham in July 2019. Following the departure of the long-serving Kerys Harrop in 2020, Scott was appointed club captain by incoming Birmingham manager Carla Ward.

In August 2023, after completing a 5-year medical degree at Keele University and returning from the 2023 Women's World Cup in Australia, Scott retired from professional football, with the intention of becoming an NHS doctor.

== International career ==
=== Youth ===
In 2010, Scott was included in the Republic of Ireland U-17 squad who were runners-up in the 2010 UEFA Women's Under-17 Championship and quarter-finalists in the 2010 FIFA U-17 Women's World Cup. Scott was born in England but eligible to play football for Ireland because three of her four grandparents were Irish. After refusing an under-19 call up in order to prioritise her educational commitments, Scott spent an extended period out of consideration at international level.

=== Senior ===
Scott made her debut for the Republic of Ireland women's national football team at the 2017 Cyprus Cup in a 2–0 win over Czech Republic. She became an important national team player under head coach Colin Bell, displaying good form in the unsuccessful 2019 FIFA Women's World Cup qualifying series. Scott was part of the team who successfully qualified for Ireland's first ever major tournament for the World Cup in Australia and New Zealand in 2023. She then represented the Republic of Ireland at the Women's World Cup 2023 in Australia in the summer.

Appearances and goals by national team and year
National team	Year	Apps
Republic of Ireland	2017	10
Republic of Ireland	2018	3
Republic of Ireland	2019	6
Republic of Ireland	2020	3
Republic of Ireland	2022	1
Total		23

== Honours ==
Reading

- FAWSL 2: 2015

Individual

- Women's International Player of the Year: 2018

== Personal life ==
During the 2020–21 FA WSL season, Scott entered her final year of studying medicine at Keele University. She is a qualified and chartered physiotherapist, and left her full-time position at Royal Berkshire Hospital to become a professional footballer, although she continued to work at the Hospital part-time. During the hiatus in her playing career with Reading, Scott moved to Bristol, attended the University of West England and worked as a physiotherapist for the Wales women's national football team under head coach Jayne Ludlow.
