= Freya Gregory =

Scottish footballer (born 2003)

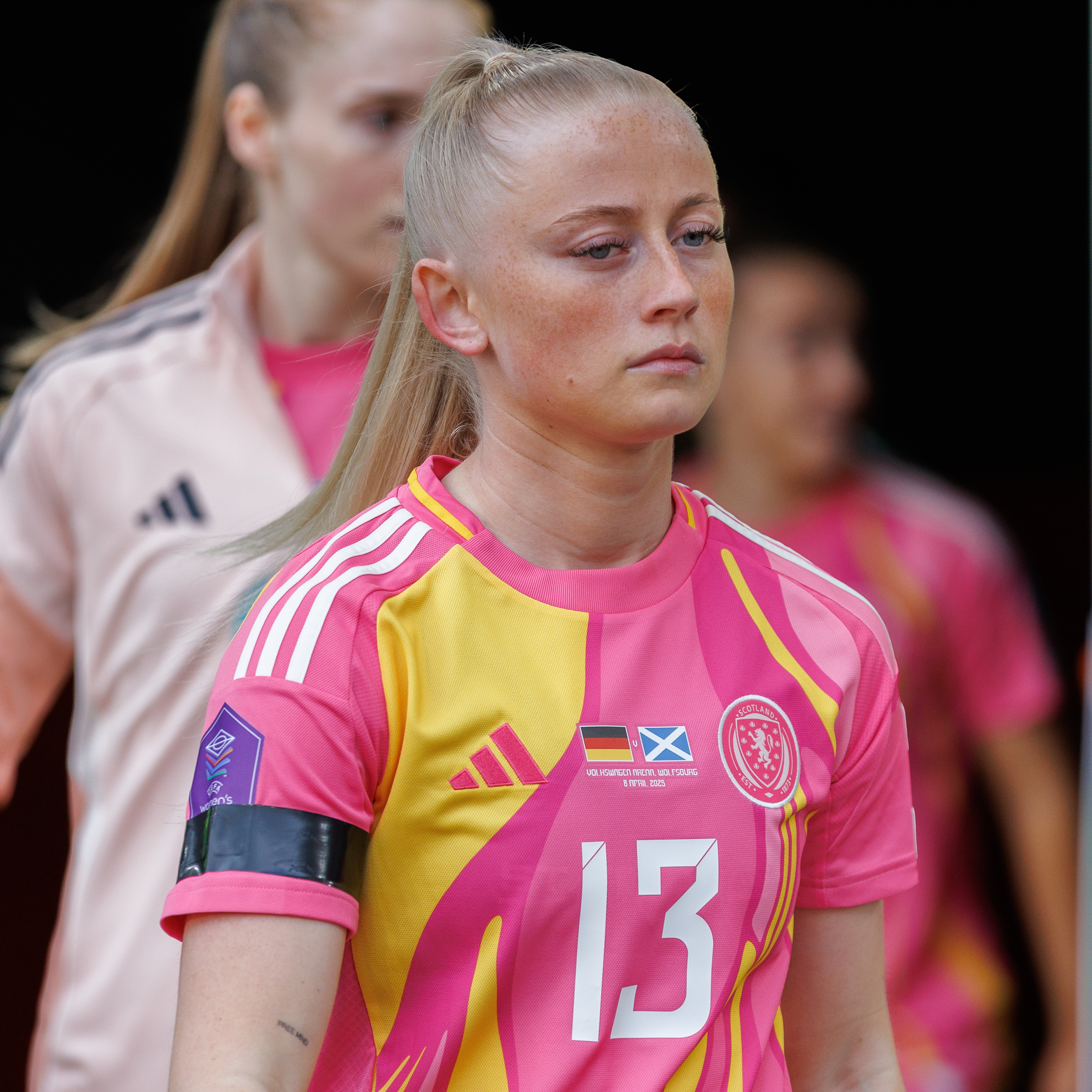
- Gregory in Scotland kit, 2025

Personal information
- Full name: Freya Mimi Gregory
- Date of birth: 12 January 2003 (age 23)
- Place of birth: Lichfield, England
- Height: 1.68 m (5 ft 6 in)
- Positions: Forward; defender

Team information
- Current team: Newcastle United
- Number: 11

Youth career
- –2018: Aston Villa
- 2018–2020: Birmingham City

Senior career*
| Years | Team | Apps | (Gls) |
| 2019–2020 | Birmingham City | 3 | (0) |
| 2020–2025 | Aston Villa | 22 | (1) |
| 2022 | → Leicester City (loan) | 11 | (1) |
| 2023–2024 | → Reading (loan) | 8 | (2) |
| 2024–2025 | → Southampton (loan) | 10 | (2) |
| 2025– | Newcastle United | 30 | (3) |

International career^{‡}
| 2019 | England U17 | 6 | (0) |
| 2021–2022 | England U19 | 10 | (3) |
| 2022–2024 | England U23 | 8 | (3) |
| 2025– | Scotland | 2 | (0) |
- * Club domestic league appearances and goals as of 12 December 2025 ‡ National team caps and goals as of 29 February 2025

Freya Mimi Gregory (born 12 January 2003) is a Scottish professional footballer who plays for Women's Super League 2 club Newcastle United, mainly as a forward. She previously played for Birmingham City and Aston Villa, and on loan at Leicester City, Reading and Southampton.

She represented her birth nation England at various youth levels and is eligible for Scotland due to her heritage. She made her competitive debut for the latter in 2025.

== Club career ==
=== Birmingham City ===
Gregory was part of the Birmingham City academy for two seasons and broke into the first team in the 2019–20 season. On 17 November 2019, Gregory made her senior debut for Birmingham City against Brighton & Hove Albion in a 3–0 FA WSL defeat. She left Birmingham in June 2020.

=== Aston Villa ===
On 4 July 2020, Gregory announced she was returning to Aston Villa, where she had previously been as a youth, ahead of the team's first season in the FA WSL. She scored her first WSL goal in late April 2021, in a 1–1 draw against her former club Birmingham. On 7 January 2022, Gregory joined Leicester City on loan for the remainder of the 2021–22 season.

==== Reading (loan) ====
On 14 September 2023, Reading announced the season-long loan signing of Gregory from Aston Villa. Gregory returned to Aston Villa on 4 January 2024, ending her loan at Reading early.

==== Southampton (loan) ====
On 5 July 2024, Gregory joined Women's Championship side Southampton on a season-long loan.

=== Newcastle United ===
On 20 January 2025, Women's Championship side Newcastle United announced the signing of Gregory on a permanent deal.

== International career ==
=== England youth ===
In October 2019, Gregory was called to up to the England U17 team to play in the 2020 U17 UEFA Women's Under-17 Championship qualification games and played against Croatia, Bosnia & Herzegovina and Belgium.

On 23 October 2021, after being named in the under-19 for 2022 U19 Championship qualification, Gregory scored a penalty against Northern Ireland in an 8–1 win in Round 1. On 17 February 2022, she scored in the under-19 Marbella International Tournament against Finland in a 4–0 victory. On 9 April, in Round 2 of U19 Championship qualification, Gregory scored the second goal in England's 2–0 victory against Iceland. In June 2022, with England qualifying for the tournament, she was named in the squad for the 2022 U19 Championship and started in their opening game of the tournament against Norway.

In February 2022, Gregory was named as part of the under-23 squad as a forward. On 10 October, she scored against Sweden in a 1–1 draw. On 10 November, after being named as part of the U23 team as a defender, she scored both goals against the Netherlands in the team's 2–0 win. During 2023, Gregory returned to the squad as a forward, playing in matches against Portugal, Belgium, and Norway. In February 2024, Gregory was again announced as a defender for the under-23 squad, featuring as the number 3 against Spain in a 3–1 defeat. In October 2024, Gregory started in a draw against Netherlands Under-23.

=== Scotland ===
Gregory was eligible to represent Scotland through ancestry and in February 2025 was named in the Scotland senior squad.

== Career statistics ==
=== Club ===
As of match played 20 January 2025

| Club | Season | League | | | FA Cup | | League Cup | | Total | |
| Club | Season | Division | Apps | Goals | Apps | Goals | Apps | Goals | Apps | Goals |
|---|---|---|---|---|---|---|---|---|---|---|
| Birmingham City | 2019–20 | Women's Super League | 3 | 0 | 0 | 0 | 1 | 0 | 4 | 0 |
| Aston Villa | 2020–21 | Women's Super League | 9 | 1 | 0 | 0 | 0 | 0 | 9 | 1 |
| Aston Villa | 2021–22 | Women's Super League | 3 | 0 | 0 | 0 | 3 | 0 | 6 | 0 |
| Aston Villa | 2022–23 | Women's Super League | 7 | 0 | 2 | 0 | 3 | 0 | 12 | 0 |
| Aston Villa | 2023–24 | Women's Super League | 3 | 0 | 0 | 0 | 0 | 0 | 3 | 0 |
| Aston Villa | Total | | 22 | 1 | 2 | 0 | 6 | 0 | 30 | 1 |
| Leicester City (loan) | 2021–22 | Women's Super League | 11 | 1 | 2 | 0 | 0 | 0 | 13 | 1 |
| Reading (loan) | 2023–24 | Women's Championship | 8 | 2 | 1 | 0 | 2 | 0 | 11 | 2 |
| Southampton (loan) | 2024–25 | Women's Championship | 10 | 2 | 0 | 0 | 1 | 0 | 11 | 2 |
| Newcastle United | 2024-25 | Women's Championship | 10 | 2 | 0 | 0 | 0 | 0 | 10 | 2 |
| Newcastle United | 2024-25 | Women's Super League 2 | 9 | 0 | 0 | 0 | 3 | 1 | 12 | 1 |
| Newcastle United | Total | | 19 | 2 | 0 | 0 | 3 | 1 | 22 | 3 |
| Career total | | | 73 | 8 | 5 | 0 | 13 | 1 | 91 | 9 |
