= Emma Kelly (footballer) =

English footballer

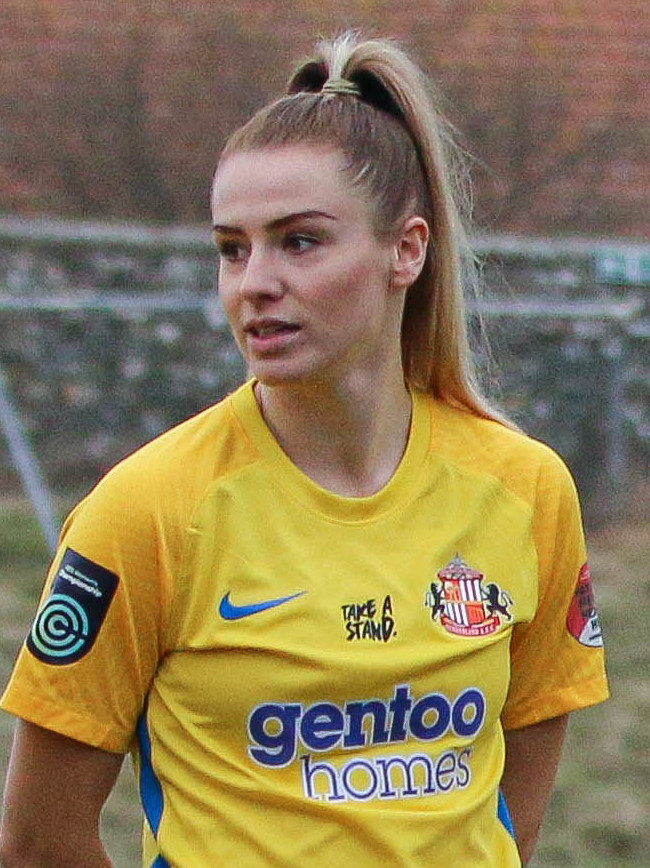
- Kelly in 2022

Personal information
- Full name: Emma Rose Kelly
- Date of birth: 26 January 1997 (age 29)
- Place of birth: England
- Positions: Midfielder; forward

Team information
- Current team: Newcastle United
- Number: 8

Senior career*
Years	Team	Apps	(Gls)
2014–2016	Sunderland	31	(2)
2016–2019	Middlesbrough	41	(8)
2019	ÍBV	18	(3)
2019–2021	Birmingham City	19	(0)
2021–2023	Sunderland	30	(2)
2023–	Newcastle United		

International career
2013	England U17	3	(0)
2016	England U19	3	(0)
- * Club domestic league appearances and goals as of 00:55, 16 April 2023

Emma Rose Kelly (born 26 January 1997) is an English footballer who plays as a midfielder for Women's Championship club Newcastle United. She previously played for Sunderland, Middlesbrough and Icelandic club ÍBV. She has represented England on the under-19 and under-17 national teams.

== Club career ==
=== Sunderland ===
In 2014, Kelly played for Sunderland in the inaugural season of the FA WSL 2 and helped them clinch league title, resulting in promotion to the top-level FA WSL the following season.

=== Middlesbrough ===
Kelly played for Middlesbrough between 2016 and 2019.

=== ÍB Vestmannaeyja ===
In 2019, Kelly signed with ÍB Vestmannaeyjar (ÍBV) in Iceland's top-division Úrvalsdeild kvenna. She scored three goals and was named the club's player of the year.

=== Birmingham City ===
In January 2020, Kelly returned to England to sign with FA WSL club Birmingham City. She made her debut for the team on 19 January 2020 as a substitute in a 2–0 defeat to Manchester City.

=== Newcastle United ===
Kelly signed for Newcastle United on 12 July 2023.

== International ==
Kelly has represented England on the under-19 and under-17 national teams. She was called to training camp for the under-21 national team.

== Honours ==
=== Club ===
Sunderland

- FA WSL 2: 2014
