= Destiney Toussaint =

English footballer

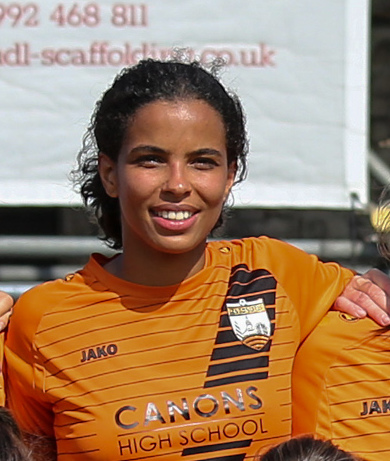
- With London Bees in 2018

Personal information
- Full name: Destiney Toussaint
- Date of birth: 5 December 1988 (age 37)
- Place of birth: England
- Position: Winger

Senior career*
Years	Team	Apps	(Gls)
2008–2012	Leicester City		
2012–2015	Coventry United		
2015	Oxford United		
2016	Aston Villa		
2017–2019	London Bees	34	(6)
2020–2021	Birmingham City	6	(0)
2021–2022	Coventry United	19	(1)
2022–2025	Wolverhampton Wanderers	48	(17)
- * Club domestic league appearances and goals

Destiney Toussaint (born 5 December 1988) is an English model and former professional footballer who played as a winger.

== Playing career ==
Toussaint began her career at Leicester City in 2008 before moving to Coventry United, where she played from 2012 to 2015. After spells at Oxford United and Aston Villa, Toussaint joined London Bees. A regular in the squad, she scored eight goals for the Bees from 2017 to 2019.

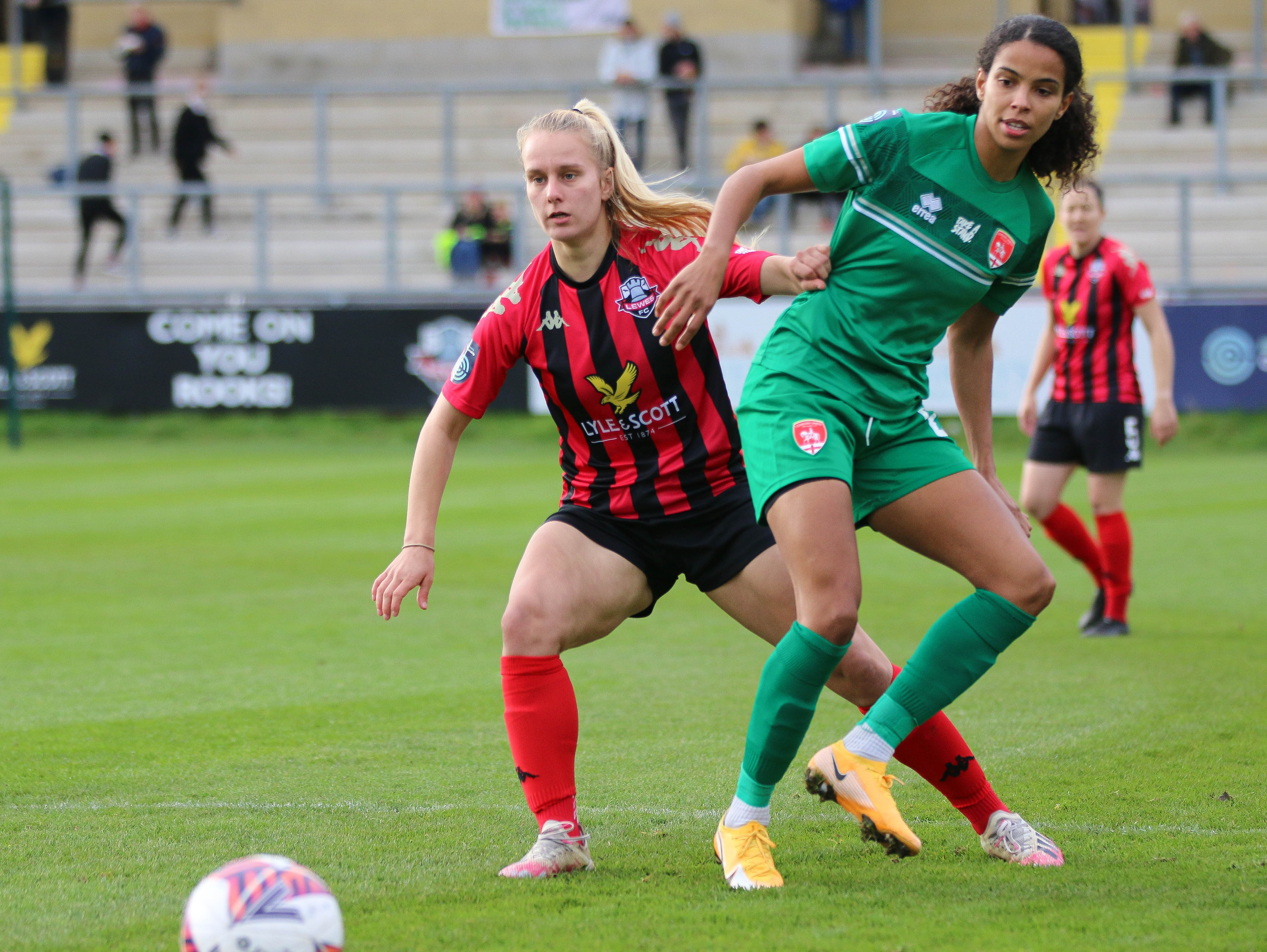
Toussaint playing for Coventry in 2021

In April 2019, during a match against Aston Villa, she sustained an anterior cruciate ligament injury and was subsequently released from the club. Toussaint claimed she was informed of her release by email after the club had refused to pay for her medical treatment. Following her recovery from injury, Toussaint joined Birmingham City. Having made just eight appearances for the club, she returned to Coventry in 2021.

On 14 August 2022, Toussaint joined Wolverhampton Wanderers. In 2023, she scored a hat-trick for the club in a National League fixture against AFC Fylde. The following year, Toussaint made club history, scoring the winning goal against Reading to secure Wolves their first victory against a first division side.

After 3 seasons and over 50 appearances for Wolves, as well as 20 years in the sport, Toussaint retired, playing the final match of her career on 27 April 2025. In a 6-0 home win against Liverpool Feds, she scored before being substituted for Jade Cross in the 75th minute. Toussaint was awarded Player of the Match.

In 2023, Toussaint was named in a pre-selection list of players being considered to represent Haiti in upcoming Gold Cup qualifying matches.

== Modelling career ==
While playing part-time for Leicester City, Toussaint was approached by a talent scout and signed with a modelling agency in Birmingham. She later moved to an agency based in London and worked as a model throughout her time as a footballer.
