= Jamie-Lee Napier =

Scottish footballer

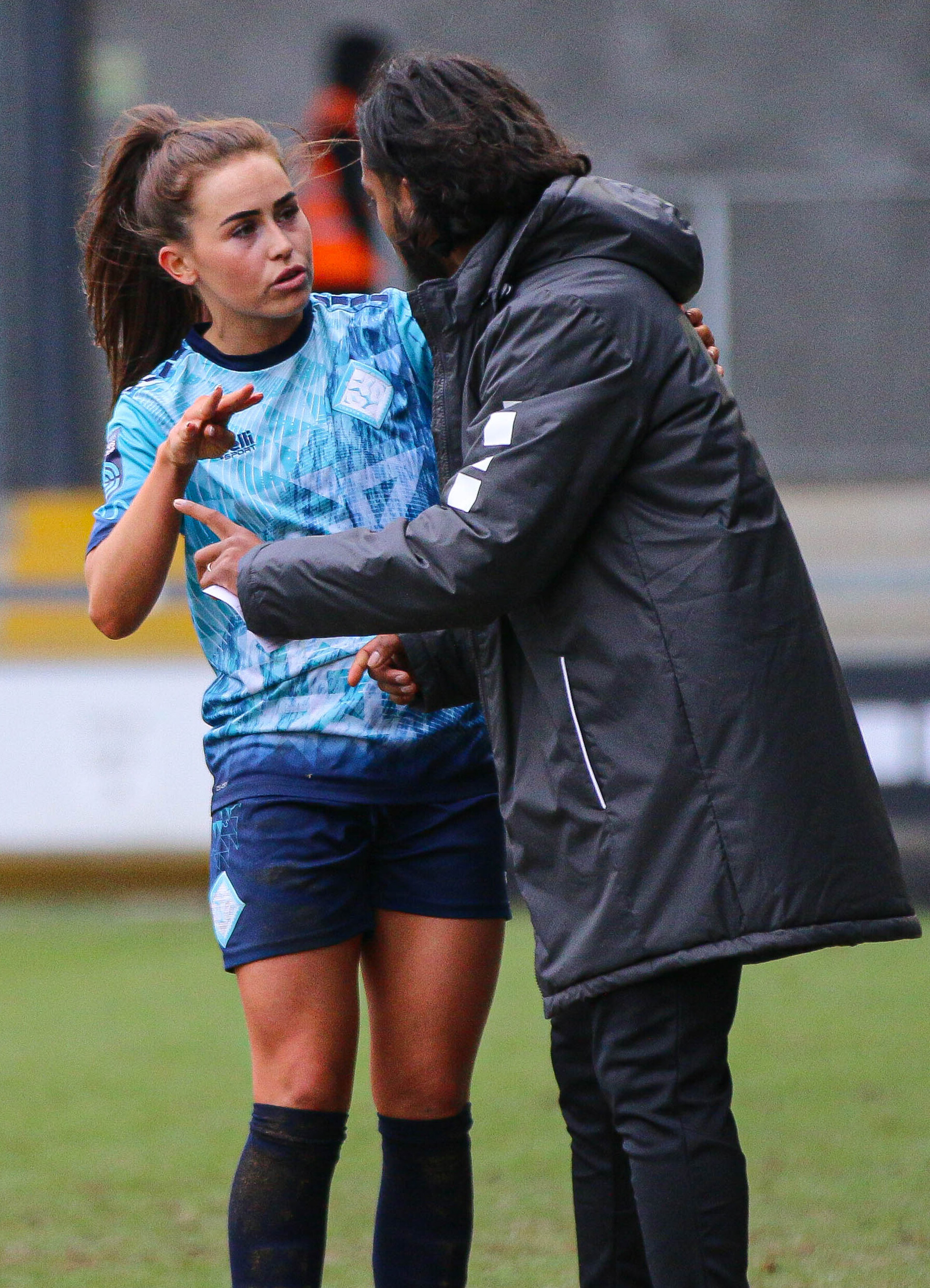
- Napier (left) in a match for London City Lionesses, 2023

Personal information
- Full name: Jamie-Lee Mackay Napier
- Date of birth: 6 April 2000 (age 26)
- Place of birth: Glasgow, Scotland
- Height: 1.62 m (5 ft 4 in)
- Positions: Full-back; winger

Team information
- Current team: Crystal Palace
- Number: 11

Youth career
- Celtic

Senior career*
Years	Team	Apps	(Gls)
2016–2017	Celtic		
2018–2019	Hibernian		
2019–2021	Chelsea	2	(0)
2020–2021	→ Birmingham City (loan)	19	(1)
2021–2023	London City Lionesses	43	(7)
2023–2025	Bristol City	29	(1)
2025-	Crystal Palace	0	(0)

International career^{‡}
2015–2017	Scotland U17	6	(0)
2017–2019	Scotland U19	19	(2)
2023–	Scotland	15	(0)
- * Club domestic league appearances and goals as of 16 December 2024 ‡ National team caps and goals as of 16 December 2024

Jamie-Lee Mackay Napier (born 6 April 2000) is a Scottish professional footballer who plays as a full-back or winger for Women's Super League club Crystal Palace and for the Scotland national team.

== Club career ==
Napier started her career with Celtic (although she supported Rangers growing up) before moving to Hibernian in January 2018. She scored 22 goals in 33 games for Hibs in 2019 and was named the Scottish Women's Premier League's player of the year, prompting Chelsea to sign her in December of the same year. In January 2020, she was named by UEFA as one of the 10 most promising young players in Europe. She credited Millie Bright and fellow Scot Erin Cuthbert in assisting her to adapt to new surroundings in the early weeks of her time in England, but the season was then curtailed due to the COVID-19 pandemic, and when play resumed (with Chelsea having been awarded the 2019–20 Women's Super League title based on points-per-game), she played no part in the club retaining the WSL title in 2020–21 having been loaned to Birmingham City, where she featured in all but three matches in their successful battle to avoid relegation.

Napier signed for second-tier London City Lionesses ahead of the 2021–22 season, and scored the winner in her second game in the South London derby against Crystal Palace. In July 2023, she departed the club.

The following month, Napier signed a two-year contract with Bristol City Women ahead of the 2023–24 season. On 22 July 2025, it was announced that Napier had departed the club upon the expiry of her contract, having made 19 WSL appearances in her first season and captained the club in her second season with Bristol.

On 22 July 2025, it was announced that Napier had joined Women's Super League 2 side Crystal Palace, signing a two-year contract with the club.

== International career ==
Napier received her first call-up to the Scotland women's national football team in August 2019. She was named again in the squad for the 2023 Pinatar Cup, and made her full international debut there in a match against the Philippines.

== Career statistics ==
As of 16 December 2024

Club	Season	League			Cup		League Cup		Europe		Total	
Club	Season	Division	Apps	Goals	Apps	Goals	Apps	Goals	Apps	Goals	Apps	Goals
Celtic	2017	SWPL							–	–		
Hibernian	2018	SWPL							–	–		
Hibernian	2019	SWPL							5	3	33	22
Hibernian	Total								5	3	33+	22+
Chelsea	2019–20	Women's Super League	2	0	0	0	1	0	0	0	3	0
Chelsea	2020–21	Women's Super League	0	0	0	0	0	0	0	0	0	0
Chelsea	Total		2	0	0	0	1	0	0	0	3	0
Birmingham City	2020–21	Women's Super League	19	1	2	0	2	0	–	–	23	1
London City Lionesses	2021–22	Women's Championship	21	2	2	0	3	0	–	–	26	2
London City Lionesses	2022–23	Championship	22	5	2	0	3	0	–	–	27	5
London City Lionesses	Total		43	7	4	0	6	0	0	0	53	7
Bristol City	2023–24	Women's Super League	19	0	1	0	2	0	–	–	22	0
Bristol City	2024–25	Championship	10	0	0	0	3	0	–	–	13	0
Bristol City	Total		29	0	1	0	5	0	0	0	35	0
Career Total			93+	8+	7+	0+	14+	0+	5	3	119+	11+

=== International appearances ===
Scotland statistics accurate as of match played 3 December 2024.

Year	Scotland	
Year	Apps	Goals
2023	7	0
2024	8	0
Total	15	0

== Honours ==
Celtic

- SWPL Cup: runner-up 2017

Hibernian

- Scottish Women's Cup: 2018; runner-up 2019
- SWPL Cup: 2018, 2019
