= Georgia Brougham =

English footballer (born 1996)

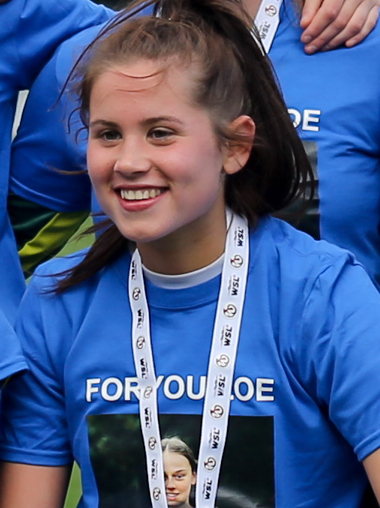
- Brougham in 2017

Personal information
- Full name: Georgia Leigh Brougham
- Date of birth: 18 March 1996 (age 30)
- Place of birth: Stockport, England
- Height: 1.76 m (5 ft 9 in)
- Position: Defender

Team information
- Current team: Nottingham Forest
- Number: 4

Youth career
- Manchester City

Senior career*
Years	Team	Apps	(Gls)
2014–2015	Manchester City	7	(0)
2016–2021	Everton	37	(3)
2020	→ Birmingham City (loan)	2	(0)
2020–2021	→ Birmingham City (loan)	16	(0)
2021–2023	Leicester City	11	(0)
2023–2025	London City Lionesses	36	(3)
2025–	Nottingham Forest	24	(2)
- * Club domestic league appearances and goals as of 15 November 2026

Georgia Leigh Brougham (born 18 March 1996) is an English football defender who plays for the Nottingham Forest in the Women's Super League 2.

Brougham has spent her entire career in England, starting her career with Manchester City before joining Everton in 2016, where she spent 5 years of her career. After loans to Birmingham City, she joined Leicester City and London City Lionesses, the latter of whom she helped gain promotion to the Women's Super League. She joined Nottingham Forest in 2025.

== Club career ==
=== Manchester City ===
Having been brought up in City's youth academy, Brougham made her first team debut in a 3–0 win over Everton in September 2014. By January 2015, Brougham signed her first professional contract for Manchester City on a two-year deal.

=== Everton ===
In February 2016, Brougham signed for Everton of the WSL 2. Brougham would score her first goal for the Blues against Aston Villa during the 2016 season and two more during the championship 2017 Spring Series. In 2020, Brougham joined Birmingham City on a short-term loan. She re-joined Birmingham on another loan later the same year. Brougham left Everton when her contract expried in June 2021.

=== Leicester City ===
In July 2021, Brougham joined Leicester City, helping the side maintain their place in the WSL in their first season in the division. In January 2023, Brougham mutually terminated her contract with Leicester City.

=== London City ===
In August 2023, the London City Lionesses announced they had signed Brougham on a one-year contract. In 2024, she signed a new one year contract extension with the club. Brougham remained at the club for two years, leaving after contributing to the Lionesses' first promotion to the top flight in 2025.

=== Nottingham Forest ===
Following Brougham's departure from London City, she joined Nottingham Forest on a two-year deal. She was named team captain for the club's first season in the WSL2.

== Honours ==
Manchester City

- Women's League Cup: 2014
