= Adrienne Jordan =

American soccer player (born 1994)

Personal information
- Full name: Adrienne Leigh Jordan
- Date of birth: January 30, 1994 (age 32)
- Place of birth: Colorado Springs, Colorado, United States
- Height: 5 ft 5 in (1.65 m)
- Positions: Full back; winger

Team information
- Current team: Fort Lauderdale United

Youth career
- 2006–2012: Pride Soccer Club

College career
Years	Team	Apps	(Gls)
2012–2015	Northern Colorado Bears	72	(2)

Senior career*
Years	Team	Apps	(Gls)
2015	Colorado Pride	11	
2016	Östersund	20	(0)
2017–2018	ÍBV	43	(1)
2018–2019	Atalanta Mozzanica	15	(0)
2019–2020	Birmingham City	17	(0)
2020	OL Reign	1	(0)
2020–2021	Granadilla	8	(0)
2021–2022	SC Sand	35	(0)
2022–2024	Turbine Potsdam	46	(0)
2024–2025	Fort Lauderdale United	16	(0)

International career
2017	United States U23		
- * Club domestic league appearances and goals as of February 26, 2023

Adrienne Leigh Jordan (born January 30, 1994) is an American soccer player who most recently played as a full back for American USL Super League club Fort Lauderdale United.

== Early life ==
Jordan was born in Colorado Springs, Colorado and holds dual citizenship through her German mother. She attended Rampart High School, where she lettered twice in soccer, swimming and track, while lettering once in basketball. Senior year she went to state for swimming and track, and currently holds one of the top 10 fastest times in the 100 and 300-meter hurdles. She graduated from the International Baccalaureate Diploma Program in May 2012.

=== University of Northern Colorado ===
She played for the Northern Colorado Bears women's soccer program from 2012 to 2016. She helped lead her team to its first ever NCAA tournament appearance by winning the Big Sky Conference tournament in 2016. With a total of 72 games played during her career as a bear, Jordan recorded 2 goals and 5 assists. Her role in the University of Northern Colorado soccer program earned her several honors and awards.

== Club career ==
=== Colorado Pride, 2015 ===
In 2015 Jordan played for the W league team, Colorado Pride. Colorado Pride took second in the nation after losing to Washington Spirit Reserves in the finals.

=== Chicago Red Stars and Östersunds DFF, 2016 ===
Jordan was drafted by the Chicago Red Stars in the 4th round of the 2016 NWSL College Draft. In doing so, she made history by being the first Northern Colorado Bears and first Big Sky player to be drafted by the NWSL. Along with this Jordan became the first Colorado Springs area player to be drafted into the NWSL.

Jordan signed with Östersunds DFF, however, she played as a left full-back as well as a left center- back for Östersunds DFF. She started in all 19 games she was available for the Elitettan team, playing a total of 1710 minutes and earned player of the match awards twice.

=== ÍB Vestmannaeyja, 2017–2018 ===
Adrienne played in the Icelandic Úrvalsdeild league for Íþróttabandalag Vestmannaeyja for the 2017 season as a right wing-back. She played in all 18 league games recording 1590 minutes played, one goal, and three assists. She also played every minute in the Women's Cup tournament to help ÍBV win the Icelandic cup.

She played a second season with ÍBV in 2018 as a right wing-back and full-back. Jordan played in all 18 league games, recording 1620 minutes played and one assist for the season. She also played in all cup games ÍBV played and earned man of the match awards four times.

=== Atalanta 2018–2019 ===
In November 2018, Jordan joined Atalanta in the Italian Serie A. Recording 15 games played throughout the 2018–2019 season playing as a full back.

=== Birmingham City, 2019–2020 ===
In August 2019, Jordan signed with English FA WSL team Birmingham City. Jordan played in 18 games during her time in Birmingham City scoring one goal in a Conti Cup game against Leicester City.

=== OL Reign, 2020 ===
After the cancellation of the WSL, Jordan joined NWSL side OL Reign for the 2020 Challenge Cup. During the short summer tournament, she saw playing time in one game after recovering from an injury. Jordan became the first player from University of Northern Colorado to play in the NWSL and the second from the Big Sky Conference.

=== UD Granadilla Tenerife, 2020 ===
Following her short appearance in the NWSL, Adrienne signed with Spanish side UD Granadilla for the 2020–2021 season.

=== SC Sand, 2021–2022 ===
Jordan joined the Bundesliga side mid way through the 2020/2021 season. Jordan extended her contract with the Bundesliga side for another season.

=== 1. FFC Turbine Potsdam, 2022-2024 ===
Jordan signed a 2 year contract with 1. FFC Turbine Potsdam.

The following season, Jordan was part of the squad promoted to the 1. Frauen Bundesliga.

=== Fort Lauderdale United, 2024–2025 ===
On June 26, 2024, it was announced that Jordan had signed with Fort Lauderdale United, joining them for the inaugural USL Super League season.

== International career ==
Jordan received a call-up to the United States U-23 team for the 2017 La Manga Series.

== Personal life ==
In 2016, Jordan graduated with a double major in Sports and Exercise Science and Foreign Language: German from the University of Northern Colorado.

== Honors ==
=== University of Northern Colorado ===
- 2014 Big Sky Co-Defensive MVP

=== ÍBV ===
- Icelandic Cup Champions, 2017
