= Kerys Harrop =

English footballer

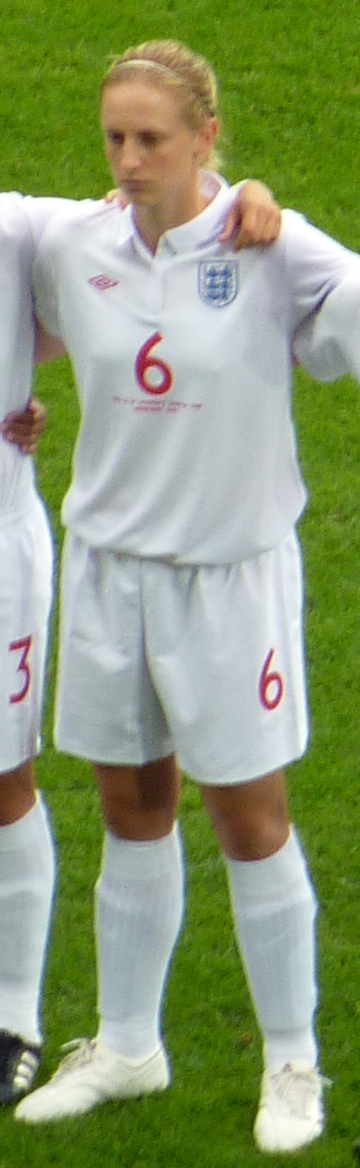
- Harrop at 2010 FIFA U-20 Women's World Cup

Personal information
- Full name: Kerys Julia Harrop
- Date of birth: 3 December 1990 (age 35)
- Place of birth: Wordsley, England
- Height: 1.75 m (5 ft 9 in)
- Position: Defender

Youth career
- Hasbury Rangers
- Birmingham City

Senior career*
Years	Team	Apps	(Gls)
2011–2020	Birmingham City	135	(13)
2020–2023	Tottenham Hotspur	48	(2)
Total		183	(15)

International career^{‡}
2009	England U19		
2010	England U20	3	(1)
Medal record
Women's football
Representing Great Britain
Summer Universiade
Gold medal – first place	2013 Kazan	Team
- * Club domestic league appearances and goals as of 24 August 2023 ‡ National team caps and goals as of 18:05, 25 July 2019 (UTC)

Kerys Julia Harrop (born 3 December 1990) is an English former footballer who played as a defender.

Harrop had been involved with the England national team at Under 19 and Under 23 level and was part of the Under 19 squad who won the European Championships in Belarus in 2009. She was also a member of the Great Britain team who won a gold medal in Kazan in the 2013 World University Games. With Birmingham City Ladies, she helped them win the FA Cup in 2012 and helped them progress to the semi-finals of the Champions League in 2014.

On 2 April 2023, she broke the Women's Super League's all-time record for appearances by chalking up her 178th game in the competition. On 24 August 2023, Harrop announced her retirement from professional football. Following her retirement, currently she has been worked as a football agent.

On 23 April 2026, it was announced that Harrop had been inducted into the WSL Hall of Fame.

In addition to her footballing achievements, Harrop has obtained a first class Honours degree from Loughborough University in Sport Science and a master's degree from the Sports Business Institute Barcelona, and PGCE Teaching Degree from the University of Wolverhampton.

Harrop holds both British and American citizenship.
