= 2016 Arsenal L.F.C. season =

English women's football club season

Arsenal Ladies
2016 season
- Chairman: Sir Chips Keswick
- Manager: Pedro Martínez Losa
- Stadium: Meadow Park
- WSL 1: Third
- FA Cup: Winners
- WSL Cup: Semi-final
- Top goalscorer: League: Danielle Carter (6); All: Danielle Carter (10)
- Highest home attendance: 1,686 (vs Manchester City, 11 September 2016)
- Lowest home attendance: 421 (vs Notts County, 5 August 2016)
- Average home league attendance: 1,209
- Biggest win: 7–0 (vs Sunderland (H), FA Cup, 17 April 2016)
- Biggest defeat: 0–2 (vs Manchester City (A), WSL 1, 28 March 2016); 0–2 (vs Chelsea (H), WSL 1, 21 April 2016)
Home colours	Away colours	Third colours

2016 Arsenal L.F.C. season
Home colours	Away colours	Third colours

The 2016 season was Arsenal Ladies Football Club's 29th season since forming in 1987. The club also participated in the sixth edition of the FA Women's Super League. Additionally, Arsenal played in the Women's FA Cup, winning the final against the previous season's champions Chelsea in May.

This was the last full Women's Super League season to be played over the summer. The following year, the league transitioned to run in line with the men's football calendar, making the league a winter-based season (running from September to May). As this season bridged the gap between the men's 2015–16 and 2016–17 seasons, the team wore two different sets of kits during each half of the season.

== Review ==
=== Pre-season ===
Following a decline in form during the previous season attributed to limited squad depth, Arsenal signed several new players. In late 2015, they signed Dutch midfielder Daniëlle van de Donk from Kopparbergs/Göteborg FC and Irish winger Katie McCabe from Shelbourne. In early 2016, they signed England midfielder Fara Williams and Nigerian striker Asisat Oshoala from Liverpool. Josephine Henning joined from Lyon, and Jodie Taylor arrived from Portland Thorns.

Meanwhile, Chioma Ubogagu departed for the NWSL to play for Houston Dash. Siobhan Chamberlain moved to Liverpool, whilst Jade Bailey joined Chelsea. Rachel Yankey and Carla Humphrey went out on loan to Notts County and Doncaster Rovers Belles respectively.

In Sevilla, Arsenal played a pre-season friendly with Bayern Munich. Jordan Nobbs gave Arsenal the lead in the first half, but Sara Däbritz equalised shortly after half-time. Substitute Natalia subsequently scored twice to secure a 3–1 victory.

=== March ===
Arsenal's competitive season began with an away trip to Birmingham City in the FA Cup fifth round. Former Arsenal player Freda Ayisi gave Birmingham the lead after 26 minutes. Arsenal scored an equaliser with just over 10 minutes remaining through Danielle Carter. Arsenal won the subsequent penalty shoot-out 5–3 to advance to the next round, with Charlie Wellings missing her spot-kick for Birmingham.

Arsenal's WSL campaign began with a home tie against recently promoted Reading. Dominique Janssen gave the home side an early lead, and early in the second half, Asisat Oshoala scored her first Arsenal goal on her debut after rounding Grace Moloney. Reading pulled a goal back through Jade Boho-Sayo, but Arsenal secured a 3–1 win with 20 minutes remaining when Carter converted Marta Corredera's corner.

Arsenal then travelled to play Manchester City. Defender Jemma Rose was sent off after 13 minutes for bringing down Jane Ross as the last defender. Ross gave Manchester City the lead midway through the second half, and Toni Duggan scored a penalty with 10 minutes left to play, resulting in a 2–0 defeat for Arsenal.

=== April ===
In the FA Cup quarter-finals, Arsenal faced Notts County at Meadow Park. Kelly Smith scored for Arsenal after 21 minutes, but Sophie Bradley-Auckland equalised shortly afterwards. Notts County took the lead when Aivi Luik scored. Ellen White was then sent off for a second bookable offence with just under 30 minutes left to play. Arsenal equalised in the 81st minute through Natalia's header, taking the match to extra time and penalties. Arsenal won the shoot-out 4–3, with goalkeeper Sari van Veenendaal saving penalties from Danielle Buet, Leanne Crichton, and Luik, before Katie McCabe scored the winning kick.

In the semi-finals against Sunderland, Emma Mitchell was sent off in the 33rd minute for two bookable offences. Despite the player disadvantage, Arsenal took the lead before half-time when Van de Donk scored from a rebound after Janssen's shot was saved. Carter added a second goal early in the second half. Sunderland's Abby Holmes was shown a red card after fouling Van de Donk in the penalty area. Fara Williams converted the resulting penalty. Van de Donk scored twice more to complete her hat-trick, Nobbs added another, and Carter scored her second in added time to complete a 7–0 victory and ensure progression to the Final.

Returning to league play, Arsenal faced their upcoming FA Cup Final opponents, Chelsea. Fran Kirby gave Chelsea the lead after capitalising on defensive errors. Arsenal had an equalising effort from Jordan Nobbs disallowed due to an earlier foul. Kirby subsequently scored her second goal from a corner, securing a 2–0 win for Chelsea.

After back-to-back defeats in the league, Arsenal secured an away win against Reading. Goals from Nobbs and Janssen put Arsenal 2–0 up after 60 minutes. Reading pulled a goal back late on through Emma Follis, but Arsenal won 2–1.

=== May ===
Arsenal subsequently drew 0–0 with Birmingham City in the league. Both sides hit the crossbar through Remi Allen and Dominique Janssen, but neither could score.

Arsenal's final game before the summer break was their FA Cup Final against Chelsea at Wembley Stadium. Arsenal won the match 1–0 after Danielle Carter scored in the first half. It was Arsenal's 14th FA Cup title, and their first since the Final was moved to the new Wembley Stadium.

=== Summer break ===
During the summer break, Arsenal played a friendly against NWSL side Seattle Reign, managed by former Arsenal manager Laura Harvey. This was the first time a WSL side and an NWSL side had faced each other. Leah Williamson was stretchered off with an ankle injury 8 minutes into the match, ruling her out of action until October. Beverly Yanez gave Seattle the lead in the first half, but Natalia scored a penalty in the second half to level the match at 1–1.

=== June ===
Arsenal returned to WSL action with a 5–1 win over Sunderland. Two own goals from Stephanie Bannon gave Arsenal an early lead, followed by two goals from Natalia. Janssen added a fifth in the second half, before Sunderland found a late consolation goal from Beth Mead.

Arsenal drew their following match 0–0 against Birmingham City.

At the end of the month, Chloe Kelly went out on loan to Everton after struggling for game time.

=== July ===
July saw the start of Arsenal's defence of their WSL Cup, opening with a 3–1 win over Reading. After a goalless first half, goals from Vicky Losada and a penalty from Fara Williams gave Arsenal the lead. Williams added a third before Reading responded through Emma Follis.

Arsenal then hosted Notts County in the league. Daniëlle van de Donk scored after 10 minutes, and Jordan Nobbs added a second 10 minutes into the second half to complete a 2–0 win.

Arsenal travelled to Wheatsheaf Park to face Chelsea, trailing the league leaders Manchester City by six points. An own goal from Sari van Veenendaal gave Chelsea an early lead. Chelsea were unable to extend their lead, and Vicky Losada equalised before half-time. With six minutes remaining, Daniëlle van de Donk scored to secure a 2–1 win for Arsenal.

Arsenal defeated Sunderland 4–0 away from home. Williams' initial penalty was saved, but Losada scored from the rebound. Nobbs and Carter added goals, and Williams converted a second penalty.

Arsenal lost 2–1 to Liverpool at Meadow Park. Williams scored first for Arsenal following a deflection, but Liverpool equalised through Shanice van de Sanden and won the match with Caroline Weir's free-kick.

=== August ===
In the WSL Cup quarter-final, Arsenal faced Notts County at The Hive. Casey Stoney gave Arsenal the lead after 9 minutes, but Notts County equalised and later took a 2–1 lead through Fern Whelan and Jess Clarke. Kelly Smith scored an equaliser for Arsenal with 25 minutes remaining, and Fara Williams scored a 90th-minute penalty to secure a 3–2 win.

Returning to the WSL, Arsenal played Notts County at Meadow Lane. Asisat Oshoala gave Arsenal the lead before half-time. Emma Byrne was sent off for fouling Ellen White, leaving Arsenal with 10 players for the final 30 minutes. Despite the disadvantage, Arsenal won 2–0 after Oshoala scored her second goal.

=== September ===
In the WSL Cup semi-final, Arsenal travelled to the Academy Stadium to face Manchester City. Arsenal were unable to convert several goalscoring opportunities, with Daniëlle van de Donk, Casey Stoney, and Danielle Carter all coming close. Manchester City ultimately won 1–0 after former Arsenal player Jen Beattie scored from a late free-kick by Toni Duggan.

The two sides played each other again seven days later in the league. Arsenal lost 1–0 following a deflected free-kick by Steph Houghton, which was credited to Jane Ross. The result effectively ended Arsenal's title hopes, leaving them 15 points behind Manchester City, though they remained seven points ahead of Chelsea in second place.

=== October ===
Arsenal defeated Doncaster Rovers Belles 5–0. Danielle Carter and Natalia both scored twice, and Kelly Smith scored the final goal in her last appearance for Arsenal. The match also marked the return of Leah Williamson from injury and Chloe Kelly following her loan spell.

In their last home game of the season, Arsenal played Doncaster Rovers Belles again. Jodie Taylor made her debut for Arsenal following a lengthy injury. She came off the bench and scored twice to secure a 2–0 win.

At the end of October, Vicky Losada, Marta Corredera, and Natalia left the club to return to Spain.

=== November ===
Arsenal's WSL campaign concluded with a 5–3 away victory against Liverpool. Liverpool took the lead through Satara Murray, but Arsenal responded with two goals from Carter. Jordan Nobbs added a third, before Shanice van de Sanden scored for Liverpool. Chloe Kelly and Asisat Oshoala both scored late on for Arsenal, and Caroline Weir scored a final goal for Liverpool.

Arsenal finished the season in third place, 10 points behind champions Manchester City and five points behind the Champions League qualification places.

== Squad information & statistics ==
=== First team squad ===
Squad statistics correct as of May 2018

Squad No.	Name	Date of Birth (Age)	Since	Last Contract	Signed From
Goalkeepers
1	(Republic of Ireland) Emma Byrne	14 June 1979 (aged 37)	2000	August 2015	(Denmark) Fortuna Hjørring
13	(Netherlands) Sari van Veenendaal	3 April 1990 (aged 26)	2015	July 2015	(Netherlands) FC Twente
23	(England) Hollie Augustus	16 November 1996 (aged 20)	2015		(England) Arsenal Academy
27	(England) Sian Rogers	28 June 1998 (aged 18)	2015		(England) Birmingham City
Defenders
2	(England) Alex Scott	14 October 1984 (aged 32)	2012	January 2014	(United States) Boston Breakers
3	(Scotland) Emma Mitchell	19 September 1992 (aged 24)	2013	August 2015	(Germany) SGS Essen
5	(England) Casey Stoney	13 May 1982 (aged 34)	2014	August 2015	(England) Lincoln
12	(Jamaica) Vyan Sampson	2 July 1996 (aged 20)	2014	January 2016	(England) Arsenal Academy
19	(England) Jemma Rose	19 January 1992 (aged 24)	2014	December 2015	(England) Bristol Academy
22	(Germany) Josephine Henning	8 September 1989 (aged 27)	2016	February 2016	(France) Lyon
24	(England) Lotte Wubben-Moy	11 January 1999 (aged 17)	2015		(England) Arsenal Academy
34	(Jamaica) Taylor Hinds	25 April 1999 (aged 17)	2016		(England) Arsenal Academy
Midfielders
4	(England) Fara Williams	25 January 1984 (aged 32)	2016	January 2016	(England) Liverpool
6	(Spain) Vicky Losada	5 March 1991 (aged 25)	2015	January 2015	(Spain) Barcelona
8	(England) Jordan Nobbs	8 December 1992 (aged 23)	2010	February 2016	(England) Sunderland
14	(England) Leah Williamson	29 March 1997 (aged 19)	2014	July 2015	(England) Arsenal Academy
16	(England) Carla Humphrey	15 December 1996 (aged 19)	2014	February 2015	(England) Arsenal Academy
17	(Spain) Marta Corredera	8 August 1991 (aged 25)	2015	July 2015	(Spain) Barcelona
20	(Netherlands) Dominique Janssen	17 January 1995 (aged 21)	2015	July 2015	(Germany) SGS Essen
21	(Netherlands) Daniëlle van de Donk	5 August 1991 (aged 25)	2015	November 2015	(Sweden) Kopparbergs/Göteborg FC
28	(England) Charlie Devlin	23 February 1998 (aged 18)	2016		(England) Arsenal Academy
Forwards
7	(Spain) Natalia Pablos	15 October 1985 (aged 31)	2014	December 2014	(England) Bristol Academy
9	(England) Danielle Carter	18 May 1993 (aged 23)	2009	January 2016	(England) Arsenal Academy
10	(England) Kelly Smith (c)	29 October 1978 (aged 38)	2012	February 2016	(United States) Boston Breakers
11	(England) Rachel Yankey	1 November 1979 (aged 37)	2005	January 2014	(United States) New Jersey Wildcats
15	(Republic of Ireland) Katie McCabe	21 September 1995 (aged 21)	2015	December 2015	(Republic of Ireland) Shelbourne
18	(England) Jodie Taylor	17 May 1986 (aged 30)	2016	March 2016	(United States) Portland Thorns
24	(Nigeria) Asisat Oshoala	9 October 1994 (aged 22)	2016	March 2016	(England) Liverpool
25	(England) Chloe Kelly	15 January 1998 (aged 18)	2015	February 2016	(England) Arsenal Academy
26	(England) Rianna Dean	21 October 1998 (aged 18)	2015		(England) Arsenal Academy

=== Appearances and goals ===
No.	Name	WSL 1		FA Cup		WSL Cup		Total	
No.	Name	Apps	Goals	Apps	Goals	Apps	Goals	Apps	Goals
Goalkeepers
1	(Republic of Ireland) Emma Byrne	1	0	0	0	3	0	4	0
13	(Netherlands) Sari van Veenendaal	15+1	0	4	0	0	0	19+1	0
23	(England) Hollie Augustus	0	0	0	0	0	0	0	0
27	(England) Sian Rogers	0	0	0	0	0	0	0	0
Defenders
2	(England) Alex Scott	14	0	3	0	3	0	20	0
3	(Scotland) Emma Mitchell	10	0	3	0	2	0	15+2	0
5	(England) Casey Stoney	12	0	4	0	3	1	19	1
12	(Jamaica) Vyan Sampson	0	0	0	0	0	0	0	0
19	(England) Jemma Rose	9+1	0	2	0	2	0	13+1	0
22	(Germany) Josephine Henning	9+1	0	1	0	2	0	12+1	0
24	(England) Lotte Wubben-Moy	0+1	0	0	0	0	0	0+1	0
34	(Jamaica) Taylor Hinds	0	0	0	0	0	0	0	0
Midfielders
4	(England) Fara Williams	12+3	2	3+1	1	2	3	17+4	6
6	(Spain) Vicky Losada	12+1	2	3+1	0	2+1	1	17+3	3
8	(England) Jordan Nobbs	13+1	4	4	1	3	0	20+1	5
14	(England) Leah Williamson	7+1	0	2+2	0	0	0	10+2	0
16	(England) Carla Humphrey	0	0	0	0	0	0	0	0
17	(Spain) Marta Corredera	5+6	0	1	0	0+2	0	6+8	0
20	(Netherlands) Dominique Janssen	8+7	3	3+1	0	3	0	14+8	3
21	(Netherlands) Daniëlle van de Donk	14+1	2	2+1	3	3	0	19+2	5
28	(England) Charlie Devlin	0	0	0	0	0	0	0	0
Forwards
7	(Spain) Natalia Pablos	6+5	4	1+2	1	0+3	0	7+10	5
9	(England) Danielle Carter	13	6	3+1	4	2	0	18+1	10
10	(England) Kelly Smith (c)	1+3	1	2+2	1	1+2	1	4+7	3
11	(England) Rachel Yankey	0	0	0	0	0	0	0	0
15	(Republic of Ireland) Katie McCabe	5+5	0	1+1	0	1	0	7+6	0
18	(England) Jodie Taylor	1+1	2	0	0	0	0	1+1	2
24	(Nigeria) Asisat Oshoala	7+6	4	2	0	1+1	0	10+7	4
25	(England) Chloe Kelly	2+2	1	0	0	0	0	2+2	1
26	(England) Rianna Dean	0	0	0	0	0	0	0	0

=== Goalscorers ===
Rank	No.	Position	Name	WSL 1	FA Cup	WSL Cup	Total
1	9	FW	(England) Danielle Carter	6	4	0	10
2	21	MF	(Netherlands) Daniëlle van de Donk	2	3	0	5
2	4	MF	(England) Fara Williams	2	1	3	6
4	7	FW	(Spain) Natalia Pablos	4	1	0	5
4	8	MF	(England) Jordan Nobbs	4	1	0	5
6	24	FW	(Nigeria) Asisat Oshoala	4	0	0	4
6	20	MF	(Netherlands) Dominique Janssen	3	0	0	3
8	10	FW	(England) Kelly Smith	1	1	1	3
8	6	MF	(Spain) Vicky Losada	2	0	1	3
10	18	FW	(England) Jodie Taylor	2	0	0	2
11	25	FW	(England) Chloe Kelly	1	0	0	1
11	5	DF	(England) Casey Stoney	0	0	1	1
Own goal				2	0	0	2
Total				33	11	6	50

=== Disciplinary record ===
Rank	No.	Position	Name	WSL 1		FA Cup		WSL Cup		Total	
Rank	No.	Position	Name	Yellow card	Red card	Yellow card	Red card	Yellow card	Red card	Yellow card	Red card
1	3	DF	(Scotland) Emma Mitchell	2	0	2	1	1	0	5	1
2	19	DF	(England) Jemma Rose	0	1	0	0	0	0	0	1
2	1	GK	(Republic of Ireland) Emma Byrne	0	1	0	0	0	0	0	1
4	10	FW	(England) Kelly Smith	2	0	1	0	1	0	4	0
5	5	DF	(England) Casey Stoney	0	0	2	0	1	0	3	0
6	22	DF	(Germany) Josephine Henning	2	0	0	0	0	0	2	0
6	6	MF	(Spain) Vicky Losada	1	0	1	0	0	0	2	0
6	21	MF	(Netherlands) Daniëlle van de Donk	2	0	0	0	0	0	2	0
9	24	FW	(Nigeria) Asisat Oshoala	0	0	1	0	0	0	1	0
9	7	FW	(Spain) Natalia Pablos	1	0	0	0	0	0	1	0
9	8	MF	(England) Jordan Nobbs	1	0	0	0	0	0	1	0
9	4	MF	(England) Fara Williams	1	0	0	0	0	0	1	0
9	2	DF	(England) Alex Scott	1	0	0	0	0	0	1	0
Total				13	2	7	1	3	0	23	3

=== Clean sheets ===
Rank	No.	Name	WSL 1	FA Cup	WSL Cup	Total
1	13	(Netherlands) Sari van Veenendaal	7	2	0	9
2	1	(Republic of Ireland) Emma Byrne	1	0	0	1
Total			8	2	0	10

== Transfers, loans and other signings ==
=== Transfers in ===
Transfers in
Announcement date	No.	Position	Player	From club
20 November 2015	21	MF	(Netherlands) Daniëlle van de Donk	(Sweden) Kopparbergs/Göteborg FC
23 December 2015	15	FW	(Republic of Ireland) Katie McCabe	(Republic of Ireland) Shelbourne
5 January 2016	4	MF	(England) Fara Williams	(England) Liverpool
18 February 2016	22	DF	(Germany) Josephine Henning	(France) Lyon
18 March 2016	24	FW	(Nigeria) Asisat Oshoala	(England) Liverpool
24 March 2016	18	FW	(England) Jodie Taylor	(United States) Portland Thorns

=== Contract extensions ===
Contract extensions
Announcement date	No.	Position	Player	At Arsenal since
15 December 2015	19	DF	(England) Jemma Rose	2014
19 January 2016	9	FW	(England) Danielle Carter	Homegrown
25 January 2016	12	DF	(Jamaica) Vyan Sampson	2014
16 February 2016	8	MF	(England) Jordan Nobbs	2010
24 February 2016	25	FW	(England) Chloe Kelly	Homegrown
25 February 2016	10	FW	(England) Kelly Smith	2012
17 June 2016	22	DF	(Germany) Josephine Henning	2016
28 June 2016	28	MF	(England) Charlie Devlin	2012
4 April 2016	13	GK	(Netherlands) Sari van Veenendaal	2015

=== Transfers out ===
Transfers out
Announcement date	No.	Position	Player	To club
20 November 2015	12	FW	(England) Chioma Ubogagu	(United States) Houston Dash
18 December 2015	15	GK	(England) Siobhan Chamberlain	(England) Liverpool
2015	21	FW	(England) Evie Clarke	(England) London Bees
11 January 2016	25	DF	(England) Jade Bailey	(England) Chelsea
31 March 2016	28	DF	(England) Taome Oliver	(England) Notts County
7 July 2016	23	GK	(England) Hollie Augustus	(England) AFC Fylde
21 October 2016	6	MF	(Spain) Vicky Losada	(Spain) Barcelona
21 October 2016	17	MF	(Spain) Marta Corredera	(Spain) Atlético Madrid
21 October 2016	7	FW	(Spain) Natalia Pablos	(Spain) Rayo Vallecano

=== Loans out ===
Loans out
Announcement date	No.	Position	Player	To club
11 October 2015	23	GK	(England) Hollie Augustus	(England) Lewes
20 January 2016	16	MF	(England) Carla Humphrey	(England) Doncaster Rovers Belles
18 March 2016	11	FW	(England) Rachel Yankey	(England) Notts County
30 June 2016	25	FW	(England) Chloe Kelly	(England) Everton

== Club ==
=== Kit (2015–16) ===
Supplier: Puma / Sponsor: Fly Emirates

Home	Home alt.	Away	Goalkeeper 1	Goalkeeper 2	Goalkeeper 3

=== Kit information ===
This is Puma's second year supplying Arsenal kit, having taken over from Nike at the beginning of the 2014–15 season.

- Home: The home kit features Arsenal's traditional colours of red and white. The kit features red trim on the sleeves and a grandad collar. Additionally, golden trim features on the kit for the first time since 2006–07. The traditional white socks are returned to the kit after the club played in hooped socks last season.
- Away: The away kit features the colours gold and navy, and is similar to the away kit worn in the 2001–02 season. The shirt has navy shoulders and a crew-neck, but the most striking feature of the kit is the subtle diamond graphic on the body of the shirt. The strip is combined with navy shorts and socks.
- Third: The third kit, which is set to be used in cup competitions, is mainly anthracite with white, gold and 'Capri Breeze' (turquoise) diagonal sashes. The kit features a monochromatic golden Arsenal badge and is combined with anthracite shorts and socks.
- Keeper: The goalkeeper kits are based in Puma new goalkeeper template utilised by the supplier's top clubs, which feature contrasting hoops on the top half of the body. The first-choice strip is dark grey with golden hoops and a lighter grey stripe on the sleeves, while the second-choice strip is aqua with black hoops and golden detailing. The alternative strip is orange and also features black hoops.

==== Kit usage (2015–16) ====
Kit usage (2015–16)
Kit	Combination	Usage	
Home	Red body; White sleeves; White shorts; White socks	WSL	Reading (H); Manchester City (A); Chelsea (H); Reading (A); Birmingham City (H)
Home	Red body; White sleeves; White shorts; White socks	FA Cup	Birmingham City (A); Notts County (H); Sunderland (H)
Home	Red body; White sleeves; White shorts; Red socks	FA Cup	Chelsea (N)
Away	Gold body; Navy sleeves; Navy shorts; Navy socks	WSL	Sunderland (A)

=== Kit (2016–17) ===
Supplier: Puma / Sponsor: Fly Emirates

Home	Away

=== Kit information ===
This is third consecutive season Puma has supplied Arsenal with kits.

- Home: The home kit features Arsenal's traditional colours of red and white, with the addition of a dark trim around the lowered neck line, on the sleeve (hooped) and along the red stripe on the shorts. The distinguishing feature of the kit is the darkened, vertical, red stripe across the centre of the kit. It also features predominantly red socks for the first time since the 2004–05 season (as opposed to only featuring on the alternate kits).
- Away: The away kit is predominantly yellow following the trend of recent Arsenal away kits. The contrasting colour is "gunmetal grey" which appears on the collar (alongside a thin, centred, yellow line), as a trim on the v-shaped neck line and on the sleeve, separated by a large yellow strip across the shoulders and multiple hooped yellow lines across the bottom section of the sleeve. The shorts are predominantly gunmetal grey, with a yellow trim along the sides. The socks are yellow with multiple gunmetal grey hooped lines on the upper section.
- Third: The third kit is an abstraction from previous alternate kits for Arsenal as it predominantly features a single colour of dark blue. A vibrant neon yellow forms the detail across a wide strip on the shoulder and on the cuffs of the sleeves. The shorts are also dark blue with neon yellow detail along the sides and the kit is completed with single-colour neon yellow socks with a single dark blue hoop on the upper section.

==== Kit usage (2016–17) ====
Kit usage (2016–17)
Kit	Combination	Usage	
Home	Red body; White sleeves; White shorts; Red socks	WSL	Sunderland (H); Birmingham City (A); Notts County (H); Chelsea (A); Liverpool (H); Notts County (A); Manchester City (H); Doncaster Rovers Belles (A); Doncaster Rovers Belles (H)
Home	Red body; White sleeves; White shorts; Red socks	WSL Cup	Reading (A); Notts County (H); Manchester City (A)
Away	Yellow body; Grey sleeves; Grey shorts; Yellow socks	WSL	Liverpool (A)

== Non-competitive ==
=== Pre-season friendly ===
6 February 2016	Arsenal	3–1	Bayern Munich	Sevilla
16:00 GMT (UTC+0)	Nobbs 6'; Natalia 60', 80'	Report	Däbritz 50'	Stadium: Estadio de La Cartuja

=== Mid-season friendly ===
27 May 2016	Seattle Reign FC	1–1	Arsenal	Seattle
00:00 BST	Yanez 17'	Report	Natalia 64' (pen.)	Stadium: Memorial Stadium

== Competitions ==
=== Overall record ===
Competition	First match	Last match	Starting round	Final position	Record							
Competition	First match	Last match	Starting round	Final position	Pld	W	D	L	GF	GA	GD	Win %
FA WSL 1	23 March 2016	6 November 2016	Matchday 1	3rd	16	10	2	4	33	14	+19	62.50
Women's FA Cup	20 March 2016	14 May 2016	Fifth round	Winners	4	2	2	0	11	3	+8	50.00
FA WSL Cup	2 July 2016	4 September 2016	First round	Semi-finals	3	2	0	1	6	4	+2	66.67
Total					23	14	4	5	50	21	+29	60.87

Source: FA WSL

=== FA WSL 1 ===
==== Partial league table ====
Pos	Team	Pld	W	D	L	GF	GA	GD	Pts	Qualification or relegation
1	Manchester City (C)	16	13	3	0	36	4	+32	42	Qualification for the Champions League knockout phase
2	Chelsea	16	12	1	3	42	17	+25	37	Qualification for the Champions League knockout phase
3	Arsenal	16	10	2	4	33	14	+19	32	
4	Birmingham City	16	7	6	3	18	13	+5	27	
5	Liverpool	16	7	4	5	27	23	+4	25	

Source: FA WSL
Rules for classification: 1) Points; 2) Goal difference; 3) Number of goals scored
(C) Champions

=== Results summary ===
Overall								Home						Away					
Pld	W	D	L	GF	GA	GD	Pts	W	D	L	GF	GA	GD	W	D	L	GF	GA	GD
16	10	2	4	33	12	+21	32	4	1	3	13	7	+6	6	1	1	20	5	+15

=== Results by matchday ===
Matchday	1	2	3	4	5	6	7	8	9	10	11	12	13	14	15	16
Ground	H	A	H	A	H	H	A	H	A	A	H	A	H	A	H	A
Result	W	L	L	W	D	W	D	W	W	W	L	W	L	W	W	W
Position	1	2	3	3	3	4	4	3	3	3	3	3	3	3	3	3

Updated to match(es) played on 20 May 2018. Source: FA WSL
W = Win; D = Draw; L = Loss

==== Matches ====
23 March 2016 1	Arsenal	3–1	Reading	Borehamwood
19:45 GMT	Janssen 34'; Oshoala 46'; Carter 70'	Report	Jade 58'	Stadium: Meadow Park; Attendance: 1,208; Referee: Robert Whitton

28 March 2016 2	Manchester City	2–0	Arsenal	Manchester
15:00 BST	Houghton (yellow card) 9'; Ross 64'; Duggan 80' (pen.)	Report	Rose (red card) 13'; A. Scott (yellow card) 80'; Mitchell (yellow card) 81'	Stadium: Academy Stadium; Attendance: 1,914; Referee: Michael Salisbury

21 April 2016 3	Arsenal	0–2	Chelsea	Borehamwood
18:00 BST	Smith (yellow card) 72'	Report	Kirby 17', 81'	Stadium: Meadow Park; Attendance: 1,337; Referee: Craig Hicks

27 April 2016 4	Reading	1–2	Arsenal	High Wycombe
19:45 BST	Walkley (yellow card) 74'; Follis 79'	Report	Nobbs 30'; Janssen 60'	Stadium: Adams Park; Attendance: 604; Referee: Antony Coggins

1 May 2016 5	Arsenal	0–0	Birmingham City	Borehamwood
14:00 BST		Report		Stadium: Meadow Park; Attendance: 1,218; Referee: Alan Young

25 June 2016 6	Arsenal	5–1	Sunderland	Borehamwood
14:00 BST	Bannon 2', 19' (o.g.); Natalia 29', 39'; Janssen 78'	Report	Mead 89'	Stadium: Meadow Park; Attendance: 804; Referee: Stuart Cheek

29 June 2016 7	Birmingham City	0–0	Arsenal	Solihull
19:45 BST	Peplow (yellow card) 87'	Report	Henning (yellow card) 57'; Losada (yellow card) 71'	Stadium: Damson Park; Attendance: 626; Referee: Mark Griffiths

10 July 2016 8	Arsenal	2–0	Notts County	Borehamwood
14:00 BST	Van de Donk 10' (yellow card) 40'; Smith (yellow card) 29'; Nobbs 55'	Report	Bassett (yellow card) 38'; R. Williams (yellow card) 40'; Moore (yellow card) 90+4'	Stadium: Meadow Park; Attendance: 873; Referee: Sam Purkiss

17 July 2016 9	Chelsea	1–2	Arsenal	Staines
15:00 BST	Van Veenendaal 8' (o.g.); Bright (yellow card) 68'	Report	Losada 44'; Van de Donk (yellow card) 69' (goal) 84'	Stadium: Wheatsheaf Park; Attendance: 1,891; Referee: Dean Treleaven

24 July 2016 10	Sunderland	0–4	Arsenal	Hetton-le-Hole
13:00 BST		Report	F. Williams (penalty missed) 10' 53' (pen.); Losada 10'; Nobbs 24'; Natalia (yellow card) 41'; Carter 47'	Stadium: Hetton Centre; Attendance: 608; Referee: John Matthews

31 July 2016 11	Arsenal	1–2	Liverpool	Borehamwood
15:00 BST	F. Williams 9'	Report	Coombs (yellow card) 20'; Van de Sanden 21'; Weir 75'	Stadium: Meadow Park; Attendance: 1,206; Referee: Antony Coggins

28 August 2016 12	Notts County	0–2	Arsenal	Nottingham
17:00 BST		Report	Henning (yellow card) 22'; Nobbs (yellow card) 37'; Oshoala 46', 69'; Byrne (red card) 59'; Mitchell (yellow card) 81'	Stadium: Meadow Lane; Attendance: 1,061; Referee: Sarah Garratt

11 September 2016 13	Arsenal	0–1	Manchester City	Borehamwood
14:00 BST		Report	Parris (yellow card) 33'; Ross 50'	Stadium: Meadow Park; Attendance: 1,686; Referee: Colin Lymer

6 October 2016 14	Doncaster Rovers Belles	0–5	Arsenal	Doncaster
19:00 BST		Report	Carter 12', 87'; Natalia 67', 84'; Smith 90'	Stadium: Keepmoat Stadium; Attendance: 954; Referee: Anna-Marie Keightly

30 October 2016 15	Arsenal	2–0	Doncaster Rovers Belles	Borehamwood
14:00 GMT	Taylor 66', 73'	Report		Stadium: Meadow Park; Attendance: 1,341; Referee: Josh Smith

6 November 2016 16	Liverpool	3–5	Arsenal	Widnes
18:00 GMT	Murray 18'; Van de Sanden 61'; Weir 90+5'	Report	Carter 24', 27'; F. Williams (yellow card) 39'; Nobbs 57'; Kelly 80'; Oshoala 90+4'	Stadium: Halton Stadium; Attendance: 1,159; Referee: David McNamara

=== Women's FA Cup ===
==== Matches ====
20 March 2016 Fifth round	Birmingham City	1–1 (a.e.t.) (3–5 p)	Arsenal	Solihull
14:00 GMT	Ayisi 26'; Haines (yellow card) 82'; Peplow (yellow card) 105'	Report	Carter 67'; Stoney (yellow card) 104'	Stadium: Damson Park; Referee: Darren Wilding
	Penalties
	Linnett (penalty scored); Harrop (penalty scored); Wellings (penalty missed); Haines (penalty scored)		(penalty scored) F. Williams; (penalty scored) Natalia; (penalty scored) Smith; (penalty scored) Carter; (penalty scored) Nobbs

3 April 2016 Quarter-finals	Arsenal	2–2 (a.e.t.) (4–3 p)	Notts County	Borehamwood
14:00 BST	Smith 21' (yellow card) 55'; Losada (yellow card) 41'; Natalia 81'	Report	White (yellow card) 4' (yellow-red card) 61'; Buet (yellow card) 10'; Bradley-Auckland 23'; Luik 33'; Crichton (yellow card) 105'	Stadium: Meadow Park; Attendance: 709; Referee: Paul Kelly
	Penalties
	F. Williams (penalty scored); Natalia (penalty scored); Nobbs (penalty missed); Smith (penalty scored); Carter (penalty missed); McCabe (penalty scored)		(penalty missed) Buet; (penalty scored) Clarke; (penalty missed) Crichton; (penalty scored) R. Williams; (penalty scored) Weston; (penalty missed) Luik

17 April 2016 Semi-finals	Arsenal	7–0	Sunderland	Borehamwood
14:00 BST	Stoney (yellow card) 15'; Mitchell (yellow card) 30' (yellow-red card) 33'; Van de Donk 39', 77', 85'; Carter 55', 90+1'; F. Williams 73' (pen.); Nobbs 82'	Report	Holmes (red card) 72'; Staniforth (yellow card) 21'; Williams (yellow card) 90'	Stadium: Meadow Park; Attendance: 902; Referee: Christopher O'Donnell

14 May 2016 Final	Arsenal	1–0	Chelsea	London
14:00 BST	Carter 18'; Oshoala (yellow card) 82'	Report	England (yellow card) 84'	Stadium: Wembley Stadium; Attendance: 32,912; Referee: Sarah Garratt

=== FA WSL Cup ===
==== Matches ====
2 July 2016 First round	Reading	3–1	Arsenal	Canons Park
17:00 BST	Follis 66'	Report	Losada 47'; F. Williams 50' (pen.), 64'	Stadium: The Hive; Attendance: 1,034; Referee: Tim Donnellan

5 August 2016 Quarter-finals	Arsenal	3–2	Notts County	Canons Park
19:00 BST	Stoney 9'; Mitchell (yellow card) 21'; Smith 82'; F. Williams 90'	Report	Whelan 41'; Clarke 52'; Moore (yellow card) 56'; James (yellow card) 82'	Stadium: The Hive; Attendance: 421; Referee: Lisa Rashid

4 September 2016 Semi-finals	Manchester City	0–1	Arsenal	Manchester
14:00 BST	Beattie 79'	Report	Smith (yellow card) 59'; Stoney (yellow card) 78'	Stadium: Academy Stadium; Attendance: 1,643; Referee: Peter Wright

== See also ==
- List of Arsenal W.F.C. seasons
- 2015–16 in English football
- 2016–17 in English football
