= Katie McCabe =

Irish footballer (born 1995)

- McCabe with Chelsea in 2026

Personal information
- Full name: Katie Alison McCabe
- Date of birth: 21 September 1995 (age 31)
- Place of birth: Kilnamanagh, Dublin, Ireland
- Height: 5 ft 5 in (1.65 m)
- Positions: Winger; forward; full-back; wing-back

Team information
- Current team: Chelsea
- Number: 15

Youth career
- Templeogue United
- St Francis

Senior career*
| Years | Team | Apps | (Gls) |
| 2011–2015 | Raheny United | 44 | (40) |
| 2015 | Shelbourne | 3 | (3) |
| 2015–2026 | Arsenal | 181 | (24) |
| 2017 | → Glasgow City (loan) | 11 | (4) |
| 2026– | Chelsea | 11 | (0) |

International career^{‡}
| 2010–2012 | Republic of Ireland U17 | 9 | (2) |
| 2012–2014 | Republic of Ireland U19 | 15 | (8) |
| 2015– | Republic of Ireland | 108 | (35) |
- * Club domestic league appearances and goals as of 21 November 2026 ‡ National team caps and goals as of 13 October 2026

Katie Alison McCabe (born 21 September 1995) is an Irish professional footballer who plays for English Women's Super League club Chelsea and captains the Republic of Ireland national team. Mainly a left back, she can also operate as a left winger and a left midfielder. McCabe is the fourth Irish woman to win a UEFA Champions League trophy. She is considered one of best left-backs in the world.

As a teenager, McCabe won the Irish Women's National League title twice and the FAI Women's Cup three times with Raheny United before signing with Arsenal in 2015. With Arsenal, she has won the FA Cup in 2016, the 2018–19 WSL, three League Cups, and the Champions League. She was also named in the PFA Team of the Year for 2021. During her short loan to Glasgow City in 2017 she also won the SWPL.

After earning her first Ireland cap in 2015, she was named the country's captain in 2017, the youngest captain in the history of the team, and named as Ireland Women's Player of the Year in 2021. In 2023, The Guardian has described McCabe as "the undoubted face of Irish women's football" and the Irish Examiner named her Sportswoman of the Year. She won Ireland's 2023 international goal of the year for her Olimpico goal against Canada in the 2023 World Cup.

In 2023, McCabe made history as the first Irish woman nominated for the renowned women's Ballon d'Or award. She was the first Irish player nominated since Roy Keane's nomination in 2000.

== Club career ==
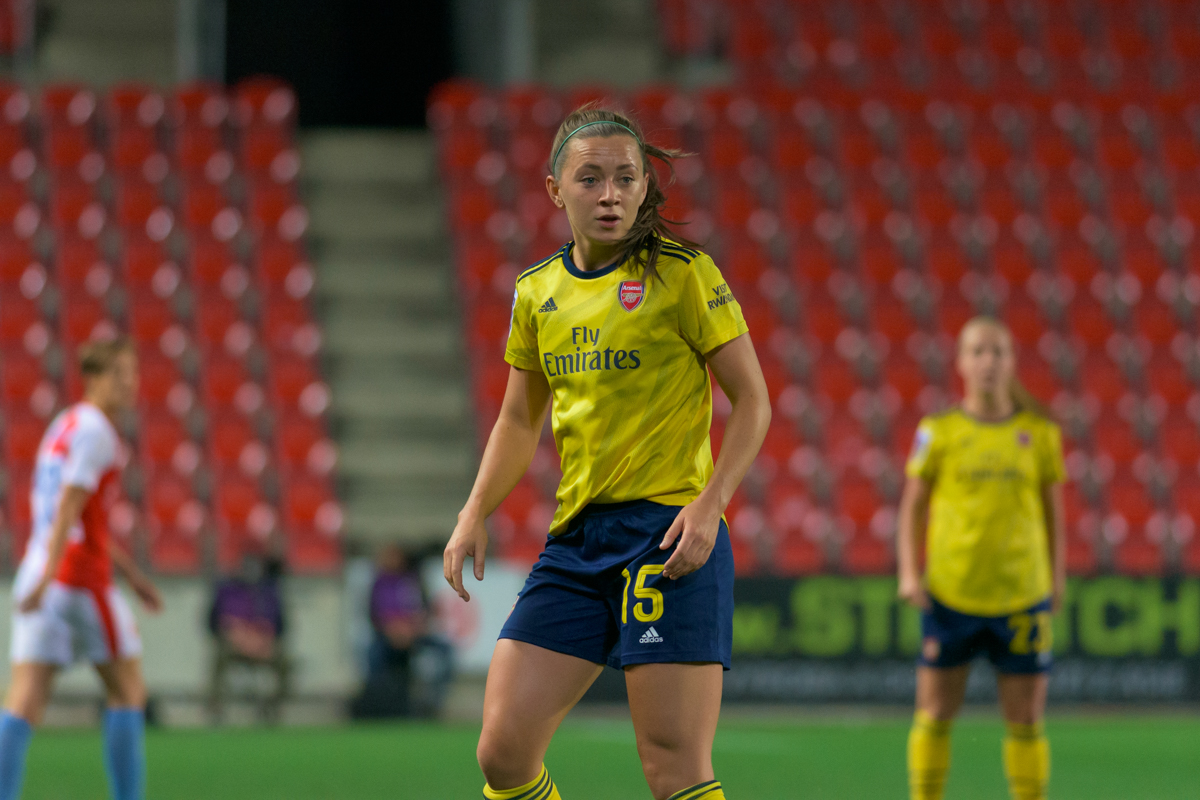
McCabe with Arsenal in 2019

=== Youth career ===
Growing up, McCabe played on boys' youth teams for Kilnamanagh AFC and Crumlin United At the age of 10, she joined her first girls' team in Templeogue, playing for both the girls' team and the boys' team until she turned 13. Her favourite player as a child was Damien Duff. During secondary school, McCabe also played Gaelic football and basketball.

=== Women's National League: 2011–2015 ===
When the Women's National League (WNL) was formed in 2011, McCabe signed with Raheny United. She had previously trained with the club, but league regulations prevented her from signing a contract until she turned 16. McCabe represented the club in the competition's first season. Over the next three seasons she won two league titles and three consecutive FAI Women's Cups with "The Pandas". She also represented the club in the UEFA Champions League.

McCabe missed four months of the 2013–14 season with a broken leg. Despite spending a majority of the season sidelined due to injury she still won the WNL Young Player of the Year award. That year, McCabe had also been recruited by Florida State University to play for the Florida State Seminoles in the United States, but the move collapsed due to her injury.

In 2014–15, McCabe scored 23 WNL goals for Raheny, two behind top scorer Áine O'Gorman of UCD Waves. In November 2014, she scored the opening goal for Raheny in the FAI Women's Cup final, from a 35-yard free kick, winning her second FAI Cup with the club. McCabe clinched the last minute winner for the 2015 WNL cup in extra time, defeating Peamount United 3–2. Her performance in the 2014-15 season landed her a spot on the WNL Team of the Season for the first time.

For the 2015–16 season, McCabe remained with the club under their new guise as Shelbourne Ladies.

=== Arsenal: 2015–2017 ===
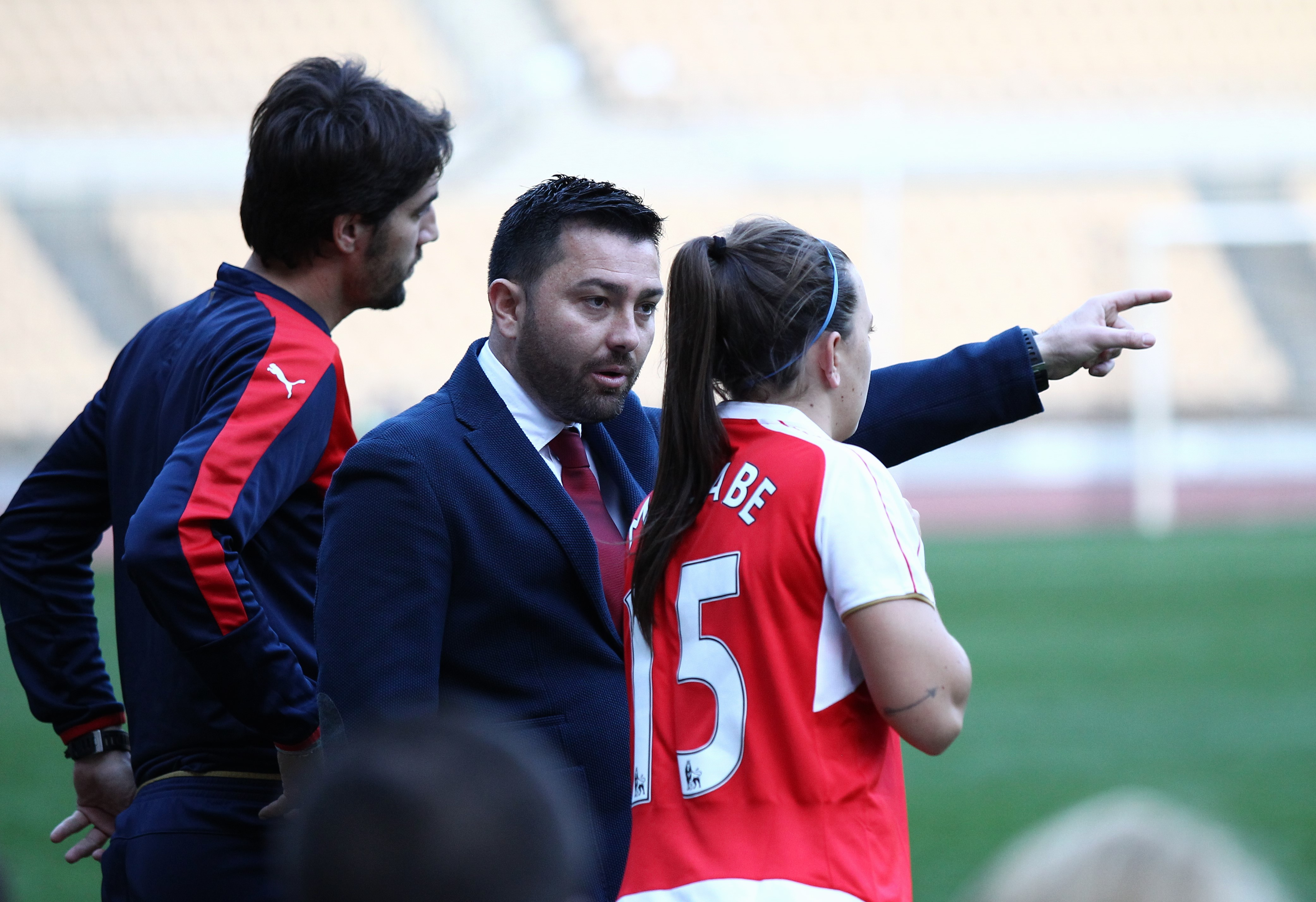
McCabe making her Arsenal debut in February 2016

In December 2015, McCabe signed for London club Arsenal, rejecting competing offers from Glasgow City, Chelsea, and Manchester City.

=== Glasgow City: 2017 (loan) ===
After struggling with injuries and limited first-team playing time in her first year with Arsenal, McCabe joined Glasgow City on loan in August 2017, for the second half of the Scottish Women's Premier League season. She would help lead Glasgow City to the Scottish title as well as making a handful of appearances in the UEFA Champions League.

=== Return to Arsenal: 2017–2026 ===
Upon returning to Arsenal at the end of her loan, new Arsenal manager Joe Montemurro shifted McCabe to the left-full-back position.

In the 2018–19 season, McCabe helped lead Arsenal to the FA WSL title, playing the most minutes of any player in the squad. On 26 March 2019, she signed an extension with Arsenal. Five days later, in one of the last matches of the year, McCabe scored a crucial game-winning goal against Birmingham, keeping Arsenal one point clear on top of the league table.

McCabe scored 5 goals and picked up 12 assists during the 2020–21 FA WSL season as Arsenal finished third. She tied for first in the league for assists and was named in the PFA Team of the Year. In December 2020, McCabe made her 100th appearance for Arsenal in a 4–0 victory over Everton, assisting a Jen Beattie goal from the corner. Later that month, McCabe was involved in a COVID-19-related controversy after posting a picture of herself on a beach in Dubai despite a travel ban for Tier 4 residents in London. She stated that she had gone to Dubai for a business meeting with her agent. McCabe did not receive any disciplinary sanctions from the FA for the controversy.

Ahead of the 2021–22 FA WSL season, McCabe signed a new long-term contract with Arsenal.

McCabe won Goal of the 2022–23 Season for her game winning strike against Manchester City. On 20 June 2023, McCabe was announced as the Arsenal Women Player of the Season.

On 29 September 2023, McCabe signed a new long-term contract with Arsenal. She made her 200th appearance for the Gunners against Manchester City on 5 November 2023.

While playing against Chelsea in her 250th game for Arsenal on 26 January 2025, McCabe received a red card for dissent, the second of her career and resulted in a two match ban. McCabe won the club-wide goal of the month for March 2025. On 24 May 2025, McCabe was part of the team that defeated Barcelona 1–0 to claim the 2024–25 UEFA Champions League trophy. She played 1,296 minutes during the entire campaign, breaking the record for amount of minutes played in one UWCL season.

On 14 May 2026, it was announced that McCabe would depart Arsenal following the expiry of her contract at the end of the season. In total, she made 305 appearances and scored 37 goals for Arsenal over more than a decade at the club, winning seven honours in total.

=== Chelsea: 2026– ===
On 1 June 2026, it was announced that McCabe had signed a three-year contract with Chelsea with the option for an additional year.

== International career ==
At the 2014 UEFA Under-19 Championship, McCabe featured as Ireland won their group, before crashing 4–0 to a Vivianne Miedema-inspired Netherlands in the semi-final.

In March 2015 national coach Susan Ronan gave McCabe a senior debut against Hungary at the 2015 Istria Cup, a 1–1 draw. A quad injury kept McCabe out of Ireland's 3–0 UEFA Euro 2017 qualifying defeat by Spain on 26 November 2015 at Tallaght Stadium, Dublin. At the 2016 Cyprus Cup, McCabe scored her first international goal to secure a 1–1 draw with Italy.

McCabe featured in Ronan's squad for the UEFA Euro qualifying stage, making seven appearances in total. In August 2017, new national team coach Colin Bell appointed 21-year-old McCabe as the Ireland captain, the youngest captain in the history of the team.

In April 2021, she earned her 50th cap for Ireland against Belgium. In September 2021, the FAI announced that it would implement equal pay for its men's and women's national teams, after negotiations led by McCabe and men's captain Séamus Coleman.

McCabe and manager Vera Pauw led Ireland to qualify for the 2023 FIFA World Cup, the first major tournament appearance in the team's history. On 26 July 2023 she scored an Olympico goal in their group stage match against Canada, becoming her country's first-ever goal-scorer at the Women's World Cup. This goal won the 2023 Ireland international goal of the year. Ireland was ultimately defeated by Canada 2–1, eliminating them from the tournament. McCabe said she was saddened by the result, but added that "this is our first ever major tournament and I know for a fact, given those performances we put in, it won't be our last."

McCabe captained the Irish team during the UEFA Euro 2025 qualifiers. Advancing to the playoffs, they took a win over Georgia, with a 6-0 victory in the opening leg. They were eventually knocked out by Wales.

On 28 October 2025, McCabe earned her 100th cap for Ireland in a 2–1 defeat to Belgium, as well as being promoted in the Nations League.

== Personal life ==
McCabe has 10 siblings, six sisters and four brothers, and was raised in Kilnamanagh. Her siblings include Gary McCabe, who played in the League of Ireland Premier Division from 2007 to 2018, and Lauryn McCabe, who currently plays for Bohemian and has previously been included in Ireland Under-16 squads.

She is openly lesbian. McCabe has been in a relationship with former Arsenal teammate and Australian international, Caitlin Foord since May 2023. She was previously in a relationship with fellow Irish footballer Ruesha Littlejohn from 2016 until 2023.

While playing in the Irish Women's National League, McCabe worked as a grill coordinator at a Nando's restaurant in Tallaght.

== Career statistics ==
=== Club ===
As of match played 21 November 2026

| Club | Season | League | | | National cup | | League cup | | Continental | | Other | | Total | |
| Club | Season | Division | Apps | Goals | Apps | Goals | Apps | Goals | Apps | Goals | Apps | Goals | Apps | Goals |
|---|---|---|---|---|---|---|---|---|---|---|---|---|---|---|
| Raheny United | 2011–12 | WNL | 12 | 5 | 0 | 0 | 0 | 0 | — | | — | | 12 | 5 |
| Raheny United | 2012–13 | WNL | 13 | 3 | 1 | 1 | 1 | 2 | — | | — | | 15 | 6 |
| Raheny United | 2013–14 | WNL | 5 | 6 | 2 | 1 | 3 | 0 | 1 | 0 | — | | 11 | 7 |
| Raheny United | 2014–15 | WNL | 11 | 23 | 1 | 1 | 2 | 4 | 2 | 0 | — | | 16 | 28 |
| Raheny United | Total | | 41 | 37 | 4 | 3 | 6 | 6 | 3 | 0 | 0 | 0 | 54 | 46 |
| Shelbourne | 2015–16 | WNL | 3 | 3 | 1 | 1 | 0 | 0 | 2 | 0 | — | | 6 | 4 |
| Arsenal | 2016 | WSL | 10 | 0 | 0 | 0 | 1 | 0 | — | | — | | 11 | 0 |
| Arsenal | 2017 | WSL | 3 | 0 | 2 | 1 | — | | — | | — | | 5 | 1 |
| Arsenal | 2017–18 | WSL | 11 | 2 | 5 | 0 | 1 | 0 | — | | — | | 17 | 2 |
| Arsenal | 2018–19 | WSL | 20 | 5 | 2 | 0 | 7 | 5 | — | | — | | 29 | 10 |
| Arsenal | 2019–20 | WSL | 13 | 0 | 3 | 1 | 7 | 3 | 4 | 0 | — | | 27 | 4 |
| Arsenal | 2020–21 | WSL | 21 | 4 | 2 | 1 | 3 | 0 | — | | — | | 26 | 5 |
| Arsenal | 2021–22 | WSL | 20 | 5 | 7 | 1 | 1 | 0 | 12 | 0 | — | | 40 | 6 |
| Arsenal | 2022–23 | WSL | 21 | 3 | 2 | 0 | 3 | 0 | 12 | 0 | — | | 38 | 3 |
| Arsenal | 2023–24 | WSL | 21 | 3 | 2 | 0 | 7 | 0 | 2 | 0 | — | | 32 | 3 |
| Arsenal | 2024–25 | WSL | 20 | 1 | 2 | 0 | 2 | 1 | 15 | 0 | — | | 39 | 2 |
| Arsenal | 2025–26 | WSL | 21 | 1 | 3 | 0 | 2 | 0 | 12 | 0 | 2 (Note: Appearances in FIFA Women's Champions Cup) | 0 | 40 | 1 |
| Arsenal | Total | | 181 | 24 | 30 | 4 | 34 | 9 | 57 | 0 | 2 | 0 | 304 | 37 |
| Glasgow City (loan) | 2017 | SWPL | 11 | 4 | 3 | 3 | — | | 2 | 0 | — | | 16 | 7 |
| Chelsea | 2026–27 | WSL | 11 | 0 | 0 | 0 | 0 | 0 | 3 | 0 | — | | 14 | 0 |
| Career total | | | 247 | 68 | 38 | 11 | 40 | 15 | 67 | 0 | 2 | 0 | 394 | 94 |

=== International ===
As of 13 October 2026
Scores and results list Republic of Ireland's goals first. Score column indicates score after each McCabe goal.

International goals scored by Katie McCabe
| No. | Cap | Date | Venue | Opponent | Score | Result | Competition | Ref. |
|---|---|---|---|---|---|---|---|---|
| 1 | 10 | 4 March 2016 | GSZ Stadium, Larnaca, Cyprus | Italy | 1–1 | 1–1 | 2016 Cyprus Women's Cup | |
| 2 | 18 | 21 August 2016 | Rodney Parade, Newport, Wales | Wales | 1–1 | 2–1 | Friendly | |
| 3 | 18 | 21 August 2016 | Rodney Parade, Newport, Wales | Wales | 2–1 | 2–1 | Friendly | |
| 4 | 22 | 6 March 2017 | Paralimni Stadium, Paralimni, Cyprus | Wales | 1–0 | 1–0 | 2017 Cyprus Women's Cup | |
| 5 | 31 | 21 January 2018 | Estádio de São Miguel, Ponta Delgada, Portugal | Portugal | 1–0 | 3–1 | Friendly | |
| 6 | 36 | 31 August 2018 | Tallaght Stadium, Dublin, Republic of Ireland | Northern Ireland | 2–0 | 4–0 | 2019 FIFA Women's World Cup qualification | |
| 7 | 36 | 31 August 2018 | Tallaght Stadium, Dublin, Republic of Ireland | Northern Ireland | 4–0 | 4–0 | 2019 FIFA Women's World Cup qualification | |
| 8 | 41 | 9 April 2019 | Mapei Stadium, Reggio Emilia, Italy | Italy | 1–0 | 1–2 | Friendly | |
| 9 | 43 | 3 September 2019 | Tallaght Stadium, Dublin, Ireland | Montenegro | 2–0 | 2–0 | UEFA Women's Euro 2022 qualifying | |
| 10 | 44 | 8 October 2019 | Tallaght Stadium, Dublin, Ireland | Ukraine | 1–0 | 3–2 | UEFA Women's Euro 2022 qualifying | |
| 11 | 47 | 11 March 2020 | Stadion pod Malim brdom, Petrovac, Montenegro | Montenegro | 2–0 | 3–0 | UEFA Women's Euro 2022 qualifying | |
| 12 | 50 | 1 December 2020 | Tallaght Stadium, Dublin, Ireland | Germany | 1–2 | 1–3 | UEFA Women's Euro 2022 qualifying | |
| 13 | 58 | 25 November 2021 | Tallaght Stadium, Dublin, Ireland | Slovakia | 1–1 | 1–1 | 2023 FIFA Women's World Cup qualification | |
| 14 | 59 | 30 November 2021 | Tallaght Stadium, Dublin, Ireland | Georgia | 6–0 | 11–0 | 2023 FIFA Women's World Cup qualification | |
| 15 | 59 | 30 November 2021 | Tallaght Stadium, Dublin, Ireland | Georgia | 7–0 | 11–0 | 2023 FIFA Women's World Cup qualification | |
| 16 | 63 | 12 April 2022 | Gamla Ullevi, Gothenburg, Sweden | Sweden | 1–0 | 1–1 | 2023 FIFA Women's World Cup qualification | |
| 17 | 65 | 27 June 2022 | Tengiz Burjanadze Stadium, Gori, Georgia | Georgia | 1–0 | 9–0 | 2023 FIFA Women's World Cup qualification | |
| 18 | 65 | 27 June 2022 | Tengiz Burjanadze Stadium, Gori, Georgia | Georgia | 4–0 | 9–0 | 2023 FIFA Women's World Cup qualification | |
| 19 | 65 | 27 June 2022 | Tengiz Burjanadze Stadium, Gori, Georgia | Georgia | 7–0 | 9–0 | 2023 FIFA Women's World Cup qualification | |
| 20 | 69 | 14 November 2022 | Marbella Football Center, San Pedro Alcántara, Spain | Morocco | 2–0 | 4–0 | Friendly | |
| 21 | 75 | 26 July 2023 | Perth Rectangular Stadium, Perth, Australia | Canada | 1–0 | 1–2 | 2023 FIFA Women's World Cup | |
| 22 | 78 | 26 September 2023 | Hidegkuti Nándor Stadion, Budapest, Hungary | Hungary | 2–0 | 4–0 | 2023–24 UEFA Nations League | |
| 23 | 79 | 27 October 2023 | Tallaght Stadium, Dublin, Ireland | Albania | 1–0 | 5–1 | 2023–24 UEFA Nations League | |
| 24 | 79 | 27 October 2023 | Tallaght Stadium, Dublin, Ireland | Albania | 2–1 | 5–1 | 2023–24 UEFA Nations League | |
| 25 | 79 | 27 October 2023 | Tallaght Stadium, Dublin, Ireland | Albania | 5–1 | 5–1 | 2023–24 UEFA Nations League | |
| 26 | 82 | 5 December 2023 | Windsor Park, Belfast, Northern Ireland | Northern Ireland | 4–0 | 6–1 | 2023–24 UEFA Nations League | |
| 27 | 90 | 25 October 2024 | Mikheil Meskhi Stadium, Tbilisi, Georgia | Georgia | 1–0 | 4–0 | 2025 Women's Euro Qualifying Play-offs | |
| 28 | 90 | 25 October 2024 | Mikheil Meskhi Stadium, Tbilisi, Georgia | Georgia | 3–0 | 4–0 | 2025 Women's Euro Qualifying Play-offs | |
| 29 | 91 | 29 October 2024 | Tallaght Stadium, Dublin, Ireland | Georgia | 3–0 | 3–0 | 2025 Women's Euro Qualifying Play-offs | |
| 30 | 98 | 24 October 2025 | Aviva Stadium, Dublin, Ireland | Belgium | 1–0 | 4–2 | 2025 UEFA Nations League Play-offs | |
| 31 | 98 | 24 October 2025 | Aviva Stadium, Dublin, Ireland | Belgium | 3–1 | 4–2 | 2025 UEFA Nations League Play-offs | |
| 32 | 102 | 3 March 2026 | Tallaght Stadium, Dublin, Ireland | France | 1–0 | 1–2 | 2027 FIFA Women's World Cup qualification | |
| 33 | 103 | 7 March 2026 | Stadion Galgenwaard, Utrecht, Netherlands | Netherlands | 1–1 | 1–2 | 2027 FIFA Women's World Cup qualification | |
| 34 | 104 | 14 April 2026 | Gdańsk Stadium, Gdańsk, Poland | Poland | 2–0 | 3–2 | 2027 FIFA Women's World Cup qualification | |
| 35 | 108 | 13 October 2026 | Páirc Uí Chaoimh, Cork, Ireland | Kazakhstan | 2–0 | 4–0 | 2027 World Cup qualification UEFA play-offs | |

== Honours ==
Raheny United

- Women's National League: 2012–13, 2013–14
- FAI Women's Cup: 2012, 2013, 2014
- WNL Cup: 2015

Arsenal

- FA Women's Cup: 2015–16
- FA Women's Super League: 2018–19
- FA Women's League Cup: 2017–18, 2022–23, 2023–24
- UEFA Women's Champions League: 2024–25
- FIFA Women's Champions Cup: 2026

Glasgow City

- Scottish Women's Premier League: 2017

Individual

- WNL Player of the Month: September 2014
- WNL Young Player of the Year: 2013-14
- WNL Team of the Season: 2014-15
- The Echo Sports Star of the Year: 2014
- Irish Times Sportswoman of the Month: November 2017, July 2023
- PFA Ireland International Women's Player of the Year: 2017, 2023
- Arsenal Women Player of the Season: 2020–21, 2022–23
- Ireland Senior International Women's Player of the Year: 2021
- PFA League WSL Team of the Year: 2021
- WSL Goal of the Month: October 2021, April 2023
- WSL Player of the Month: October 2021
- Arsenal Women Goal of the Season: 2021-22, 2022-23
- The Guardian's The 100 Best Female Footballers in the World: 2021 Rank #60 2023 Rank #30 2024 Rank #61
- WSL Goal of the Season: 2022-23
- UEFA Women's Champions League Team of the Season: 2022-23
- Arsenal Women Player of the Month: October 2023
- PFA WSL Fans Player of the Month: October 2023
- HerSport Athlete of the Year: 2023
- Irish Times Sportswoman of the Year: 2023
- FAI International Goal of the Year: 2023
- Global Gael Athlete of the Year: 2023
- Arsenal Emirates Goal of the Month: March 2025
- EA Sports FC Barclays WSL Team of the Season: 2024-25
