= Wayne Rooney's Street Striker =

- Genre: Sports
- Starring: Wayne Rooney (coach); Andy Ansah (football consultant: 2008–2010); Sue Smith (football consultant: 2008–2009)
- Narrated by: Natalie B
- Country of origin: United Kingdom
- Original language: English
- No. of series: 3
- No. of episodes: 10

Production
- Running time: 60mins (inc. adverts)
- Production company: Plum Pictures

Original release
- Network: Sky1 (2008–2010)
- Release: 30 November 2008 – 5 December 2010

Wayne Rooney's Street Striker (also known as Coke Zero Street Striker due to a sponsorship deal with Coca-Cola) is a British reality television series that was broadcast on Sky1 and in high definition on Sky1 HD. The prize for the winners of the competition includes trips to a football training camp in Brazil and South Africa for the 2010 FIFA World Cup Final.

== Background ==
Wayne Rooney played as a striker for Everton, Manchester United and the England national team. He is one of the most recognised footballers in England and world football. He grew up in Croxteth, an inner-city part of Liverpool and practised his skills in the streets near his house, and it was this upbringing that inspired the show. The idea of Wayne Rooney's Street Striker came about in 2008 and the first series was filmed and broadcast in October and November of that year around the area of Stockport just outside Manchester. The aim was to find a talented young footballer who could perform a range of tricks.

== Format ==
The show takes the form of a contest to find the most skillful street footballer in the United Kingdom. It is fronted by Rooney and former professional footballer Andy Ansah. England women's team footballer Sue Smith was also involved for the first two series.

During the first two series of Street Striker, young hopefuls around the UK were put to their test at trials, and only 24 talented footballers made it to the television show to appear on the episodes and perform in front of Rooney.

In the third series, the search for the UK's most talented street striker was bigger than ever, with massive open-auditions held in both Manchester and Birmingham. Talented youngsters were also scouted from numerous eleven-a-side football clubs and five-a-side Power League teams all over the country.

Ansah scouted all around the UK for talent, and brought to Rooney 100 talented young footballers who had the potential to be crowned Wayne Rooney's Street Striker 2010.

Rooney had also upped the age limit to 16- to 24-year-olds, he wanted better talent, ability, mental strength and attitude than what he had in the previous two series of Street Striker.

In the first episode, it shows the Top 100 Street Footballers of the UK being whittled down to just 20, who would then go on and perform in very difficult street football challenges in front of Wayne Rooney and be judged by him. This year contestants had to perform in front of massive crowds, which only added to the pressure to perform well.

Contestants who made it through to the Final 20 in Street Striker 2010 included River, Hollie, Ricky, Mamus, Rosie, Alando, Lee, Jay, Jamie, Shpresim, Shannon, Daniel, Olly, Charlotte, Chris, Craig and others. Ricky won.

The prize for the winner of the first series, Travis Beckford was a trip to a football training camp in Brazil, while the second series winner, Ashleigh Goddard, won tickets to the 2010 FIFA World Cup Final in Johannesburg, South Africa.

It was confirmed that the prize for the winner of the third series who was Jack Erritt from Haywards Heath would win a trip to Wales, where they will visit street football projects in the Swansea community. They also get the chance to see the professional side Swansea FC play a match and perform some of their skills on the pitch at half-time.

== Broadcast ==
The first series consisted of three episodes but the second and third series had one extra episode. The first series was broadcast on Sky1 on Sunday evenings at 7pm, beginning on 30 November 2008. The second series began on 8 November 2009 and ran for four weeks. The third series started airing on Sky1 and Sky1 HD on 14 November 2010. The series director was Mike Christie.
