= Lotte Wubben-Moy =

English footballer

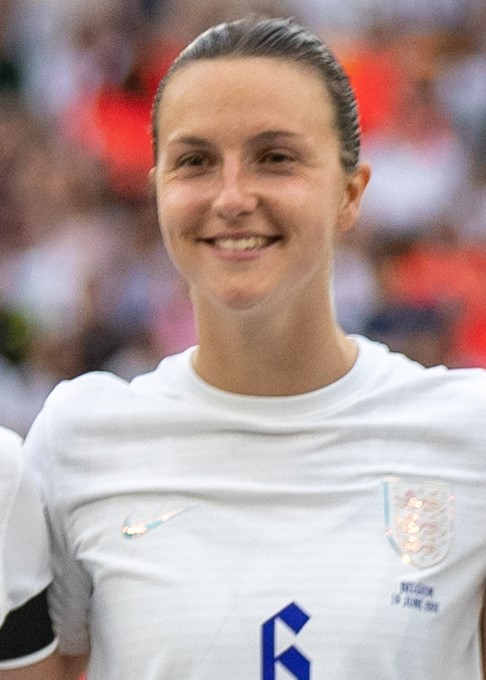
- Wubben-Moy with England in 2022

Personal information
- Full name: Carlotte Mae Wubben-Moy
- Date of birth: 11 January 1999 (age 27)
- Place of birth: Bow, London, England
- Height: 1.78 m (5 ft 10 in)
- Position: Defender

Team information
- Current team: Arsenal
- Number: 3

Youth career
- Arsenal

College career
Years	Team	Apps	(Gls)
2017–2019	North Carolina Tar Heels	62	(6)

Senior career*
Years	Team	Apps	(Gls)
2015–2017	Arsenal	11	(0)
2020–	Arsenal	106	(7)

International career^{‡}
2014	England U15	1	(0)
2015–2017	England U17	23	(2)
2017	England U20	1	(0)
2019–	England U21	10	(0)
2021–	England	19	(1)
Medal record
Women's football
Representing England
UEFA Women's Championship
Winner	2022 England
Winner	2025 Switzerland
UEFA–CONMEBOL Finalissima
Winner	2023 England
FIFA Women's World Cup
Runner-up	2023 Australia and New Zealand
- * Club domestic league appearances and goals as of 15 November 2026 ‡ National team caps and goals as of 5 June 2026

Carlotte Mae Wubben-Moy (Dutch: [ˈlɔtə ˌʋubəˈmɔi]; born 11 January 1999) is an English professional footballer who plays as a defender for Arsenal in the Women's Super League and the England national team.

Wubben-Moy played college soccer for the North Carolina Tar Heels. She represented England at multiple youth levels from under-15 up to under-21, and made her debut for the England women's team in February 2021.

== Early life ==
Wubben-Moy was born in Bow, London, to an English mother, Claire Moy, and Antonius Wubben, the Dutch owner of Kaizen Furniture Makers. Wubben-Moy is fluent in Dutch. She has an older sister, Vita.

Wubben-Moy attended Olga Primary School and Anglo European School, where she was named victrix ludorum in 2015. She also attended Stoke Newington School and Sixth Form for her A-levels.

Wubben-Moy played football and netball at school, as well as competing in track and field.

As part of the "Where Greatness Is Made" campaign, a plaque honouring Wubben-Moy was installed in Chadwell Heath.

== Club career ==
=== Arsenal, 2015–2017 ===
Having captained the Arsenal development team to an FA WSL Development Cup and two FA Youth Cup wins, Wubben-Moy made her senior debut aged 16 on 23 July 2015. She made two appearances during the 2015 FA WSL season in which Arsenal won both the WSL Cup and FA Cup; a cup double.

Despite suffering an injury setback during pre-season ahead of the 2017 FA WSL Spring Series, Wubben-Moy started in all eight of Arsenal's Spring Series games.

=== North Carolina Tar Heels, 2017–2020 ===
In October 2017, Wubben-Moy moved to the United States to play college soccer, joining ACC team North Carolina Tar Heels. She majored in exercise and sport science. Wubben-Moy had been offered a contract with Arsenal which included online university classes, but sought an in-person experience, and followed England (and later Arsenal) teammate Alessia Russo to the University of North Carolina at Chapel Hill.

She scored her first collegiate goal on 8 September 2019 in an 8–0 win against UNLV Rebels, the first of six goals she scored in her junior year.

In August 2020, Wubben-Moy announced that, alongside Russo, she was forgoing her final year of college eligibility amid uncertainty around the season due to the COVID-19 pandemic.

During her time with the Tar Heels, she was named to the 2018 All-AAC Academic Women's Soccer team, 2019 second-team All-AAC selection, and All-Tournament at the 2019 ACC Tournament.

=== Return to Arsenal, 2020–present ===
Following three seasons with UNC, Wubben-Moy returned to Arsenal, signing a professional contract on 11 September 2020. Wubben-Moy scored her first goal for Arsenal on 11 October 2020 against Brighton and Hove Albion, a 5–0 victory for Arsenal.

On 19 March 2021, Wubben-Moy scored her second goal for Arsenal against Manchester United in a game that finished 2–0; she went on to win Player of the Match. At the end of March, she was named Barclays WSL Player of the Month.

In April 2022, Wubben-Moy signed a new contract with Arsenal.

Wubben-Moy was named Player of the Season for the 2023–24 season.

In April 2025, Wubben-Moy signed a new three year deal with Arsenal. With Arsenal, she won the 2024–25 Champion's League; Arsenal remain the only women's team in England to have won the title.

On 1 February 2026, Wubben-Moy scored in Arsenal's 3–2 victory over Corinthians, helping the club to win the inaugural FIFA Women’s Champions Cup.

== International career ==
=== Youth ===
Wubben-Moy captained the England under-17 team at the 2016 U-17 Women's World Cup where the team reached the quarter-finals. Later that year, she also captained England at the 2016 Under-17 Championship, leading the team to a third-place finish.

=== Senior ===
On 23 February 2021, Wubben-Moy made her senior international debut, coming on as a second half substitution for fellow Arsenal player Leah Williamson in a 6–0 victory over Northern Ireland. On 27 May 2021, she was named as a reserve player for Great Britain at the 2020 Summer Olympics.

In June 2022, Wubben-Moy was included in the England squad which won the Euro 2022. She did not play at the tournament.

In April 2023, Wubben-Moy was part of the England squad that won the 2023 Women's Finalissima against Brazil. On 31 May 2023, Wubben-Moy was named to the squad for the 2023 Women's World Cup in July 2023.

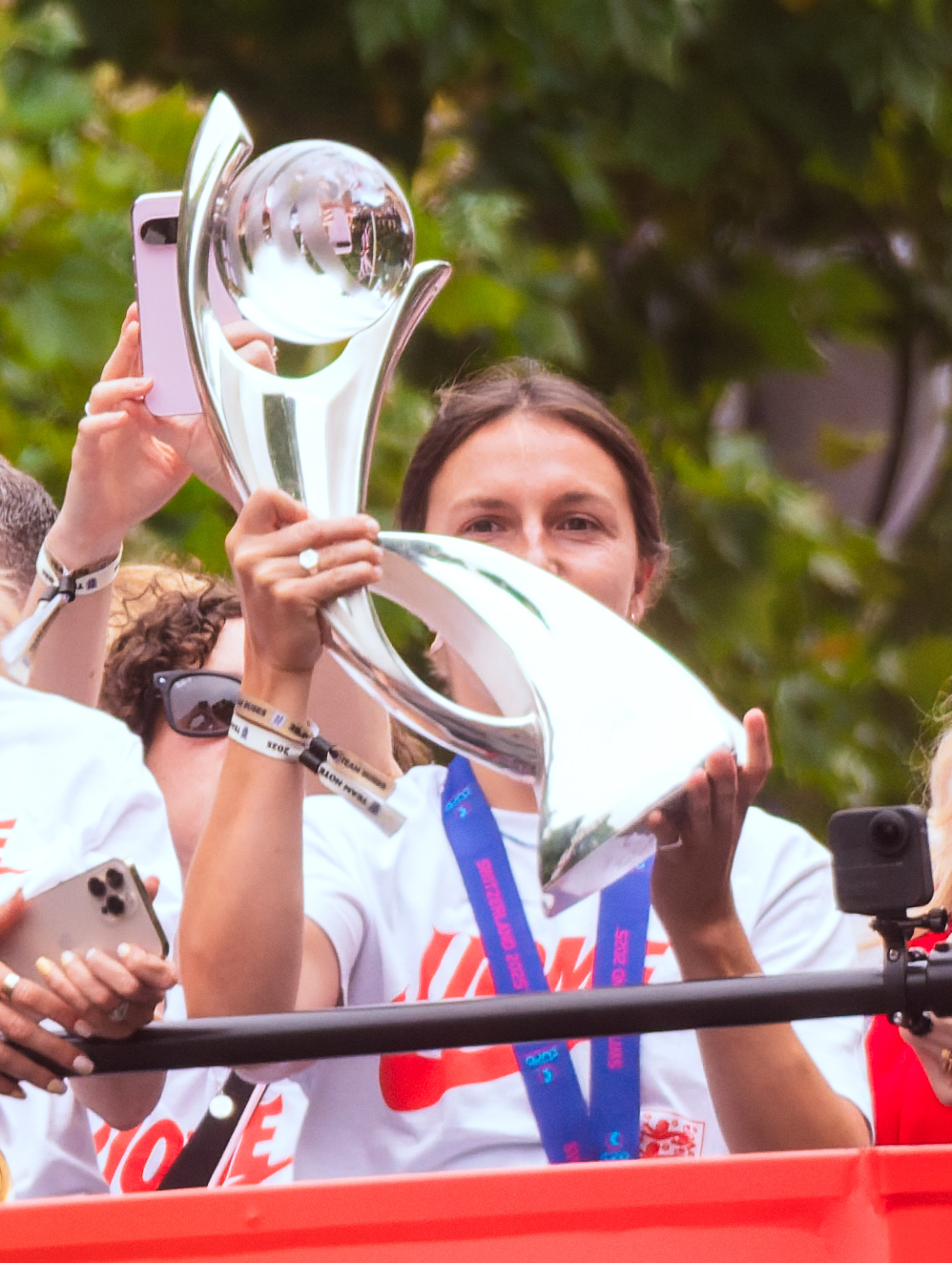
Wubben-Moy with the Women's Euro trophy in 2025

She scored her first international goal on 27 February 2024 during a 5–1 friendly victory over Italy. In May 2024, Wubben-Moy was forced to withdraw from the upcoming Euro 2025 qualifiers due to a foot injury.

After replacing Millie Bright in the squad prior to the tournament, Wubben-Moy was a part of the squad which won Euro 2025. She was again an unused substitute at the tournament.

== Activism ==
After winning the Euro 2022, Wubben-Moy spoke to England captain Leah Williamson about writing an open letter to the two UK prime ministerial candidates asking for equal access to football for girls. The resulting letter was signed by all 23 members of the tournament squad.

On 8 March 2023, to coincide with International Women's Day, the UK Government announced that it would meet the team's requests: that schools would deliver a minimum of two hours of physical education per week and ensure that girls have equal access to all school sport, including football. Wubben-Moy was credited by Williamson and the England team as the ‘‘driving force’’ behind the action.

As part of her 2022 contract extension with Arsenal, Wubben-Moy asked for the club to include a commitment to developing a community programme in her name. The programme – known as ‘Lots to Explore’ – provides weekly creative opportunities for 16-year-old girls in the club's local areas.

After meeting a severely deaf fan in 2023, Wubben-Moy has dedicated goals to the fan with a goal celebration in tribute.

== Personal life ==
Wubben-Moy grew up a fan of Arsenal, with her aunt singing fan chants to her as lullabies.

She lived with England and Arsenal teammate Alessia Russo during her freshman year at the University of North Carolina at Chapel Hill.

As of 2022, Wubben-Moy is in a relationship with cyclist Tao Geoghegan Hart. The pair married in the summer of 2026.

== Career statistics ==
=== College ===
Team	Season	NCAA Regular Season			ACC Tournament		NCAA Tournament		Total	
Team	Season	Division	Apps	Goals	Apps	Goals	Apps	Goals	Apps	Goals
North Carolina; Tar Heels	2017	Div. I	8	0	3	0	3	0	14	0
North Carolina; Tar Heels	2018	Div. I	15	0	3	0	6	0	24	0
North Carolina; Tar Heels	2019	Div. I	15	3	3	2	6	1	24	6
Total			38	3	9	2	15	1	62	6

=== Club ===
As of match played 15 November 2026.

Appearances and goals by club, season and competition
Club	Season	League			FA Cup		League Cup		Europe		Other		Total	
Club	Season	Division	Apps	Goals	Apps	Goals	Apps	Goals	Apps	Goals	Apps	Goals	Apps	Goals
Arsenal	2015	WSL	2	0	0	0	2	0	—		—		4	0
Arsenal	2016	WSL	1	0	0	0	0	0	—		—		1	0
Arsenal	2017	WSL	8	0	0	0	—		—		—		8	0
Arsenal	2020–21	WSL	17	2	1	0	3	0	—		—		21	2
Arsenal	2021–22	WSL	17	2	3	0	0	0	8	2	—		28	4
Arsenal	2022–23	WSL	21	1	2	0	2	0	10	0	—		35	1
Arsenal	2023–24	WSL	18	1	2	0	4	1	2	0	—		26	2
Arsenal	2024–25	WSL	11	1	2	0	2	0	6	0	—		21	1
Arsenal	2025–26	WSL	17	0	2	0	2	0	11	0	2 (Note: Appearances in FIFA Women's Champions Cup)	1	34	1
Arsenal	2026–27	WSL	5	0	0	0	—		1	0	—		6	0
Total			117	7	12	0	15	1	38	2	2	1	184	11

=== International ===
Statistics accurate as of match played 5 June 2026.

Year	England		Great Britain	
Year	Apps	Goals	Apps	Goals
2021	6	0	0	0
2022	2	0	—N/a	
2023	2	0	—N/a	
2024	3	1	—N/a	
2025	2	0	—N/a	
2026	4	0	—N/a	
Total	19	1	0	0

Scores and results list England's goal tally first, score column indicates score after each Wubben-Moy goal.

List of international goals scored by Lotte Wubben-Moy
No.	Date	Venue	Opponent	Score	Result	Competition	Ref.
1	27 February 2024	Estadio Nuevo Mirador, Algeciras, Spain	Italy	1–0	5–1	Friendly	

== Honours ==
North Carolina Tar Heels

- Atlantic Coast Conference regular season: 2018, 2019
- ACC Women's Soccer Tournament: 2017, 2019
- NCAA Division I College Cup runners-up: 2018, 2019

Arsenal

- FA WSL Cup / FA Women's League Cup: 2015, 2022–23, 2023–24
- FA Cup: 2016
- UEFA Women's Champions League: 2024–25
- FIFA Women's Champions Cup: 2026

England

- FIFA Women's World Cup runner-up: 2023
- UEFA Women's Championship: 2022, 2025
- Women's Finalissima: 2023
- Arnold Clark Cup: 2023

Individual

- Freedom of the City of London (announced 1 August 2022)
- Arsenal Player of the Month: December 2023 April 2023
- Arsenal Player of the Season: 2023–24
- PFA WSL Team of the Year: 2023–24

== See also ==
- List of University of North Carolina at Chapel Hill Olympians
