= Sue Smith (footballer) =

English footballer

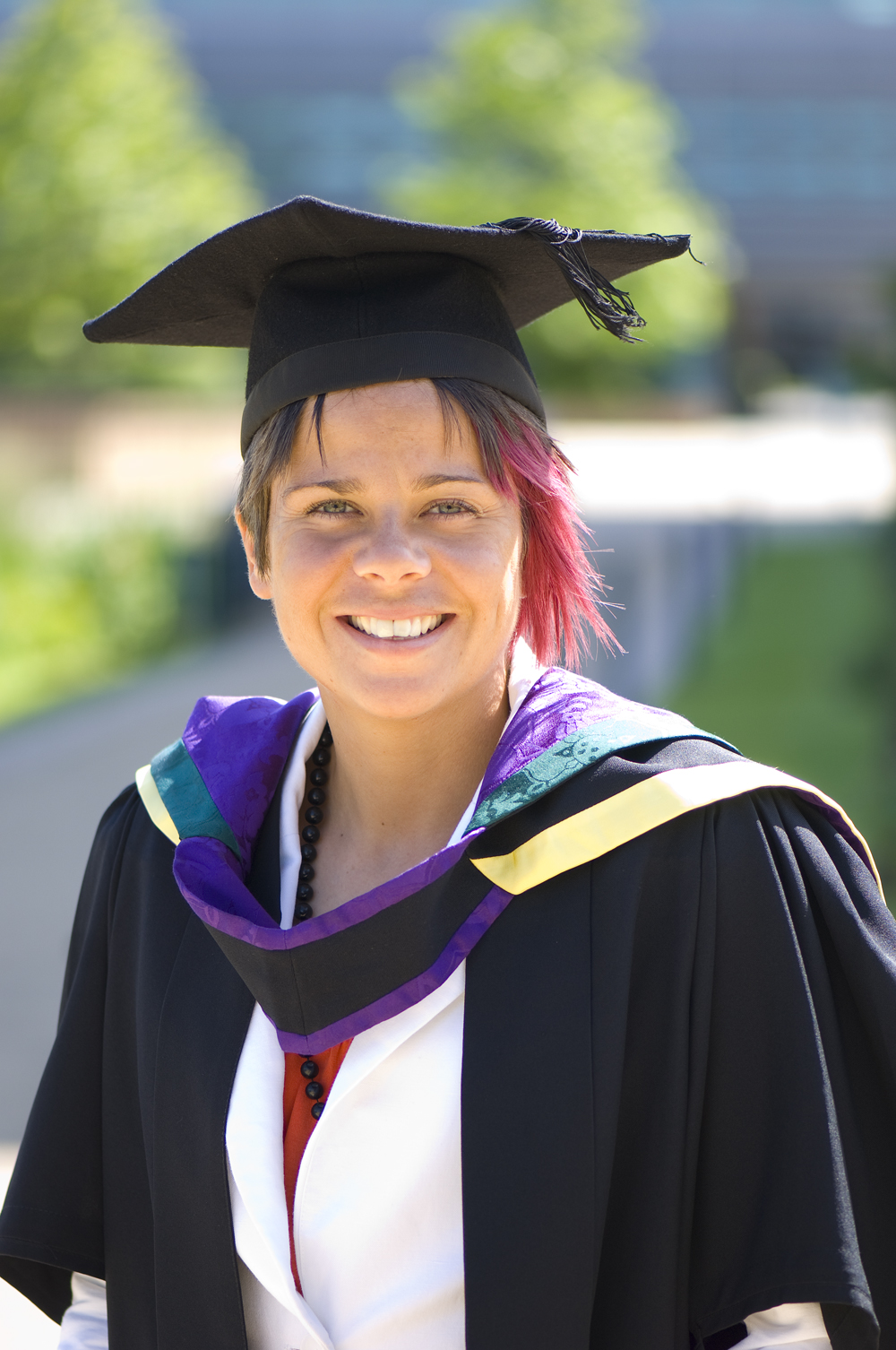
- Smith in July 2009

Personal information
- Full name: Susan Jane Smith
- Date of birth: 24 November 1979 (age 46)
- Place of birth: Prescot, England
- Height: 5 ft 5 in (1.65 m)
- Positions: Winger; forward

Youth career
- Rainhill United
- St Helens

Senior career*
| Years | Team | Apps | (Gls) |
| 1994–2002 | Tranmere Rovers | | |
| 2002–2010 | Leeds United / Carnegie | | |
| 2010–2011 | Lincoln Ladies | 14 | (2) |
| 2011–2016 | Doncaster Rovers Belles | | |

International career^{‡}
| 1997–2012 | England | 94 | (16) |
- * Club domestic league appearances and goals as of 31 August 2011 ‡ National team caps and goals as of 23:08, 6 March 2012 (UTC)

Susan Jane Smith (born 24 November 1979) is an English former footballer who played as a winger or forward.

== Club career ==
Smith played for Tranmere Rovers since she was a teenager, but after years of fielding several offers from top clubs around the country, she signed on for Leeds United (known as Leeds Carnegie from 2008 until 2010) in the summer of 2002. She was twice runner-up in the FA Women's Cup with Leeds.

Following the failure of Leeds' bid to join the FA WSL, Smith signed for Lincoln Ladies in August 2010. In December 2011, Smith joined Doncaster Rovers Belles, who had tried to sign her on two previous occasions. Belles manager John Buckley described the capture of Smith as "a tremendous coup for the club". Smith scored on her Belles debut in a 2–1 FA Women's Cup win at Barnet, but was later carried off with damaged cruciate and medial ligaments. When she was subsequently ruled out for at least seventy months, Buckley rued "a disaster for Sue and a disaster for the club."

After some injuries, she left Doncaster before the 2017 season. She never announced her retirement from football, but had not played since the end of the 2016 season.

== International career ==
Smith made her England debut as a 17–year–old substitute in February 1997, scoring in a 6–4 friendly defeat to Germany at Deepdale in Preston. One of her brightest England moments was scoring a hat-trick of tremendous goals in a home friendly against Spain in March 2001.

She has twice won the International Player of the Year award – in 1999 and 2001. In 1999, she was also voted Players' Player of the Year.

Before winning the 1999 awards, Smith represented her country when she was picked to play in a FIFA XI against the United States in a showpiece match in San Jose.

She made her domestic comeback at the start of the 2002–03 season after suffering a broken leg and torn ligament damage after a training ground accident in February, and after featuring in the series of friendlies in the build-up to Euro 2005, narrowly missed selection in the final 20. Smith bounced back, scoring against Austria in the first Women's World Cup qualifier of the campaign.

In May 2009, Smith was one of the first 17 female players to be given central contracts by The Football Association. In June 2011, she was surprisingly left out of England's 2011 FIFA Women's World Cup squad.

Smith was allotted 118 when the FA announced their legacy numbers scheme to honour the 50th anniversary of England's inaugural international.

=== International goals ===
Scores and results list England's goal tally first.

| # | Date | Venue | Opponent | Result | Competition |
|---|---|---|---|---|---|
| 1 | 27 February 1997 | Deepdale, Preston | Germany | 4–6 | Friendly |
| 2 | 30 October 1997 | Boleyn Ground, London | Netherlands | 1–0 | 1999 FIFA Women's World Cup qual. |
| 3 | 13 September 1998 | Stadionul Poiana, Câmpina | Romania | 4–1 | 1999 FIFA Women's World Cup qual. |
| 4 | 17 October 1999 | Sportanlagen Trinermatten, Zofingen | Switzerland | 1–0 | 2001 UEFA Women's Championship qual. |
| 5 | 20 February 2000 | Estádio do Sport Grupo Sacavenense, Lisbon | Portugal | 2–2 | 2001 UEFA Women's Championship qual. |
| 6 | 23 April 2000 | Oakwell, Barnsley | Portugal | 2–0 | 2001 UEFA Women's Championship qual. |
| 7 | 13 May 2000 | Memorial Ground, Bristol | Switzerland | 1–0 | 2001 UEFA Women's Championship qual. |
| 8 | 28 November 2000 | Brisbane Road, London | Ukraine | 2–0 | 2001 UEFA Women's Championship qual. |
| 9 | 22 March 2001 | Kenilworth Road, Luton | Spain | 4–2 | Friendly |
| 10 | 22 March 2001 | Kenilworth Road, Luton | Spain | 4–2 | Friendly |
| 11 | 22 March 2001 | Kenilworth Road, Luton | Spain | 4–2 | Friendly |
| 12 | 13 March 2005 | Estádio Fernando Cabrita, Lagos | Mexico | 5–0 | Algarve Cup |
| 13 | 1 September 2005 | Ertl-Glas Stadion, Amstetten | Austria | 4–1 | 2007 FIFA Women's World Cup qual. |
| 14 | 20 April 2006 | Priestfield Stadium, Gillingham | Austria | 4–0 | 2007 FIFA Women's World Cup qual. |
| 15 | 9 March 2011 | Dasaki Stadium, Akhna | South Korea | 2–0 | Cyprus Cup |
| 16 | 9 March 2011 | Dasaki Stadium, Akhna | South Korea | 2–0 | Cyprus Cup |

== Honours ==
Tranmere Rovers

- FA Women's Premier League Northern Division: 1995–96

Leeds Carnegie

- FA Women's Premier League Cup: 2009–10

Individual

- FA Players' Player of the Year Award: 1998–99
- FA International Player of the Year Award: 1998–99, 2000–01

== Media career ==
In 2000, Smith and her Tranmere teammates featured in a television advert for Daz washing powder alongside Julian Clary. Smith was later a regular contributor to the Yorkshire Evening Post's women's football section, and also offered her views and commentary skills for BBC Sport. From 2008 to 2009, Smith appeared alongside Wayne Rooney in his three-part Sky1 show Street Striker.

In July 2009, Smith was awarded an honorary degree by Edge Hill University. In November 2010, she opened Chipping Sodbury Secondary School's sports centre.

She has also appeared as a co-presenter on EFL on Quest, an EFL highlights show on Quest.

She currently works as analyst and commentator for many platforms, often seen on Sky Sports for Women's Super League games and Soccer Saturday on Sky Sports News.

In 2023, she was added as a commentator on EA Sports FC 24, commentating alongside Guy Mowbray.

== Personal life ==
Throughout her career, Smith has been recognisable by her hairstyles. She is an Everton supporter.
