= 2020–21 Arsenal W.F.C. season =

English women's football club season

Arsenal Women
2020–21 season
- Owner: Kroenke Sports & Entertainment
- Manager: Joe Montemurro; Jonas Eidevall (For the delayed FA Cup ties only)
- Stadium: Meadow Park
- WSL: 3rd
- FA Cup: Final
- League Cup: Group stage
- Top goalscorer: League: Vivianne Miedema (18); All: Vivianne Miedema (25)
- Biggest win: 10–0 (vs Gillingham (H), FA Cup, 18 April 2021)
- Biggest defeat: 1–4 (vs Chelsea (A), League Cup, 7 October 2020); 0–3 (vs Chelsea (A), WSL, 10 February 2021); 0–3 (vs Chelsea (N), FA Cup, 5 December 2021)
| Home colours | Away colours | Third colours |
- All statistics correct as of 16 May 2021.

2020–21 Arsenal W.F.C. season
| Home colours | Away colours | Third colours |
- All statistics correct as of 8 May 2022.

The 2020–21 season was Arsenal Women's Football Club's 34th season of competitive football. The club participated in the WSL, the FA Cup and the League Cup and in addition to that they competed in the 2019–20 FA Cup and the 2019–20 Champions League, which could not be completed in the previous season due to the COVID-19 pandemic.

== Squad information & statistics ==
Statistics as of 16 May 2021

=== First team squad ===
| No. | Name | Date of birth (age) | Since | Last Contract | Signed from |
Goalkeepers
| 1 | (Austria) Manuela Zinsberger | 19 October 1995 (aged 25) | 2019 | February 2021 | (Germany) Bayern Munich |
| 18 | (Australia) Lydia Williams | 13 May 1988 (aged 33) | 2020 | July 2020 | (Australia) Melbourne City |
| 24 | (England) Fran Stenson | 27 April 2001 (aged 20) | 2019 | August 2019 | (England) Manchester City |
Defenders
| 3 | (England) Lotte Wubben-Moy | 11 January 1999 (aged 22) | 2020 | September 2020 | (United States) University of North Carolina |
| 4 | (England) Anna Patten | 20 April 1999 (aged 22) | 2021 | January 2021 | (United States) University of South Carolina |
| 5 | (Scotland) Jen Beattie | 13 May 1991 (aged 30) | 2019 | June 2019 | (England) Manchester City |
| 6 | (England) Leah Williamson | 29 March 1997 (aged 24) | 2014 | March 2018 | (England) Arsenal Academy |
| 12 | (Australia) Steph Catley | 26 January 1994 (aged 27) | 2020 | July 2020 | (Australia) Melbourne City |
| 16 | (Switzerland) Noelle Maritz | 23 December 1995 (aged 25) | 2020 | July 2020 | (Germany) VfL Wolfsburg |
| 20 | (Germany) Leonie Maier | 29 September 1992 (aged 28) | 2019 | May 2019 | (Germany) Bayern Munich |
| 20 | (Denmark) Simone Boye Sørensen ‡ | 3 March 1992 (aged 29) | 2021 | July 2021 | (Germany) Bayern Munich |
| 22 | (Austria) Viktoria Schnaderbeck | 4 January 1991 (aged 30) | 2018 | June 2020 | (Germany) Bayern Munich |
| 29 | (England) Teyah Goldie | 27 June 2004 (aged 17) | 2021 | | (England) Arsenal Academy |
| 30 | (England) Ruby Mace | 5 September 2003 (aged 17) | 2020 | | (England) Arsenal Academy |
| 31 | (England) Anouk Denton | 9 May 2003 (aged 18) | 2020 | | (England) Arsenal Academy |
| 32 | (England) Gracie Pearse | 13 September 2002 (aged 18) | 2021 | | (England) Arsenal Academy |
| 33 | (England) Grace Garrad | 19 June 2003 (aged 18) | 2020 | | (England) Arsenal Academy |
Midfielders
| 7 | (Netherlands) Daniëlle van de Donk | 5 August 1991 (aged 29) | 2015 | March 2019 | (Sweden) Kopparbergs/Göteborg FC |
| 8 | (England) Jordan Nobbs | 8 December 1992 (aged 28) | 2010 | April 2020 | (England) Sunderland |
| 10 | (Scotland) Kim Little (c) | 29 June 1990 (aged 31) | 2016 | August 2019 | (United States) Seattle Reign |
| 12 | (Norway) Frida Maanum ‡ | 16 July 1999 (aged 21) | 2021 | July 2021 | (Sweden) Linköpings FC |
| 13 | (Switzerland) Lia Wälti | 19 April 1993 (aged 28) | 2018 | December 2019 | (Germany) Turbine Potsdam |
| 14 | (Netherlands) Jill Roord | 22 April 1997 (aged 24) | 2019 | May 2019 | (Germany) Bayern Munich |
| 21 | (Switzerland) Malin Gut | 1 August 2000 (aged 20) | 2020 | July 2020 | (Switzerland) Grasshopper |
Forwards
| 9 | (England) Beth Mead | 9 May 1995 (aged 26) | 2017 | November 2019 | (England) Sunderland |
| 11 | (Netherlands) Vivianne Miedema | 15 July 1996 (aged 24) | 2017 | December 2018 | (Germany) Bayern Munich |
| 14 | (England) Nikita Parris ‡ | 10 March 1994 (aged 27) | 2021 | July 2021 | (France) Olympique Lyonnais |
| 15 | (Republic of Ireland) Katie McCabe | 21 September 1995 (aged 25) | 2015 | May 2021 | (Republic of Ireland) Shelbourne |
| 17 | (Scotland) Lisa Evans | 21 May 1992 (aged 29) | 2017 | December 2018 | (Germany) Bayern Munich |
| 19 | (Australia) Caitlin Foord | 11 November 1994 (aged 26) | 2020 | January 2020 | (Australia) Sydney FC |
| 23 | (Japan) Mana Iwabuchi ‡ | 18 March 1993 (aged 28) | 2021 | May 2021 | (England) Aston Villa |
| 77 | (United States) Tobin Heath ‡ | 29 May 1988 (aged 33) | 2021 | September 2021 | (England) Manchester United |

Italic indicates an academy player.

‡ = Player joined the club after the regular European domestic season (after June 2021), and played during the 2020–21 season in games postponed due to the COVID-19 pandemic

=== Appearances and goals ===
| No. | Name | WSL | | FA Cup | | League Cup | | Total | |
| No. | Name | Apps | Goals | Apps | Goals | Apps | Goals | Apps | Goals |
Goalkeepers
| 1 | (Austria) Manuela Zinsberger | 13 | 0 | 1 | 0 | 1 | 0 | 15 | 0 |
| 18 | (Australia) Lydia Williams | 9 | 0 | 1 | 0 | 1 | 0 | 11 | 0 |
| 24 | (England) Fran Stenson | 0 | 0 | 0 | 0 | 1 | 0 | 1 | 0 |
Defenders
| 3 | (England) Lotte Wubben-Moy | 17 | 2 | 1 | 0 | 3 | 0 | 21 | 2 |
| 4 | (England) Anna Patten | 7 | 0 | 2 | 1 | 0 | 0 | 9 | 1 |
| 5 | (Scotland) Jen Beattie | 8 | 2 | 0 | 0 | 2 | 0 | 10 | 2 |
| 6 | (England) Leah Williamson | 20 | 1 | 2 | 0 | 3 | 0 | 25 | 1 |
| 12 | (Australia) Steph Catley | 6 | 0 | 1 | 0 | 0 | 0 | 7 | 0 |
| 16 | (Switzerland) Noelle Maritz | 12 | 0 | 1 | 2 | 1 | 0 | 14 | 2 |
| 20 | (Germany) Leonie Maier | 10 | 0 | 2 | 0 | 1 | 0 | 13 | 0 |
| 20 | (Denmark) Simone Boye Sørensen ‡ | 0 | 0 | 0+2 | 0 | 0 | 0 | 0+2 | 0 |
| 22 | (Austria) Viktoria Schnaderbeck | 6 | 0 | 0 | 0 | 1 | 0 | 7 | 0 |
| 29 | (England) Teyah Goldie | 0 | 0 | 2 | 0 | 0 | 0 | 2 | 0 |
| 30 | (England) Ruby Mace | 3 | 0 | 0 | 0 | 2 | 1 | 5 | 0 |
| 31 | (England) Anouk Denton | 1 | 0 | 0 | 0 | 0 | 0 | 1 | 0 |
| 32 | (England) Gracie Pearse | 0 | 0 | 0 | 0 | 0 | 0 | 0 | 0 |
| 33 | (England) Grace Garrad | 0 | 0 | 0 | 0 | 0 | 0 | 0 | 0 |
Midfielders
| 7 | (Netherlands) Daniëlle van de Donk | 21 | 2 | 2 | 2 | 3 | 0 | 26 | 3 |
| 8 | (England) Jordan Nobbs | 16 | 5 | 2 | 2 | 0 | 0 | 18 | 7 |
| 10 | (Scotland) Kim Little (c) | 16 | 5 | 4+1 | 3 | 2 | 0 | 23 | 8 |
| 12 | (Norway) Frida Maanum ‡ | 0 | 0 | 1+2 | 0 | 0 | 0 | 1+2 | 0 |
| 13 | (Switzerland) Lia Wälti | 20 | 0 | 1 | 0 | 3 | 0 | 24 | 0 |
| 14 | (Netherlands) Jill Roord | 19 | 7 | 2 | 4 | 2 | 0 | 23 | 11 |
| 21 | (Switzerland) Malin Gut | 16 | 0 | 1 | 0 | 2 | 0 | 19 | 0 |
Forwards
| 9 | (England) Beth Mead | 21 | 4 | 2 | 3 | 2 | 0 | 25 | 6 |
| 11 | (Netherlands) Vivianne Miedema | 22 | 18 | 2 | 2 | 3 | 5 | 27 | 25 |
| 14 | (England) Nikita Parris ‡ | 0 | 0 | 2+1 | 1 | 0 | 0 | 2+1 | 1 |
| 15 | (Republic of Ireland) Katie McCabe | 21 | 4 | 2 | 1 | 3 | 0 | 26 | 5 |
| 17 | (Scotland) Lisa Evans | 11 | 2 | 0 | 0 | 1 | 0 | 12 | 2 |
| 19 | (Australia) Caitlin Foord | 21 | 10 | 2 | 0 | 3 | 2 | 26 | 12 |
| 23 | (Japan) Mana Iwabuchi ‡ | 0 | 0 | 1+2 | 1 | 0 | 0 | 1+2 | 1 |
| 77 | (United States) Tobin Heath ‡ | 0 | 0 | 1 | 0 | 0 | 0 | 1 | 0 |

Italic indicates an academy player.

‡ = Player joined the club after the regular European domestic season (after June 2021), and played during the 2020–21 season in games postponed due to the COVID-19 pandemic

=== Goalscorers ===
| Rank | No. | Position | Name | WSL | FA Cup | League Cup | Total |
|---|---|---|---|---|---|---|---|
| 1 | 11 | FW | (Netherlands) Vivianne Miedema | 18 | 2 | 5 | 25 |
| 2 | 19 | FW | (Australia) Caitlin Foord | 10 | 0 | 2 | 12 |
| 3 | 14 | MF | (Netherlands) Jill Roord | 7 | 4 | 0 | 11 |
| 4 | 8 | MF | (England) Jordan Nobbs | 5 | 2 | 0 | 6 |
| 4 | 9 | FW | (England) Beth Mead | 4 | 3 | 0 | 6 |
| 4 | 10 | MF | (Scotland) Kim Little | 5 | 2 | 0 | 6 |
| 7 | 15 | FW | (Republic of Ireland) Katie McCabe | 4 | 1 | 0 | 5 |
| 8 | 7 | MF | (Netherlands) Danielle van de Donk | 2 | 2 | 0 | 3 |
| 9 | 5 | DF | (Scotland) Jen Beattie | 2 | 0 | 0 | 2 |
| 9 | 17 | FW | (Scotland) Lisa Evans | 2 | 0 | 0 | 2 |
| 9 | 3 | DF | (England) Lotte Wubben-Moy | 2 | 0 | 0 | 2 |
| 9 | 16 | MF | (Switzerland) Noelle Maritz | 0 | 2 | 0 | 2 |
| 13 | 6 | DF | (England) Leah Williamson | 1 | 0 | 0 | 1 |
| 13 | 4 | DF | (England) Anna Patten | 0 | 1 | 0 | 1 |
| 13 | 23 | FW | (Japan) Mana Iwabuchi ‡ | 0 | 1 | 0 | 1 |
| 13 | 14 | FW | (England) Nikita Parris ‡ | 0 | 1 | 0 | 1 |
| Own goal | | | | 1 | 0 | 0 | 1 |
| Total | | | | 61 | 19 | 7 | 85 |

=== Disciplinary record ===
| Rank | No. | Position | Name | WSL | | FA Cup | | League Cup | | Total | |
| Rank | No. | Position | Name | Booked | Sent off (straight red) | Booked | Sent off (straight red) | Booked | Sent off (straight red) | Booked | Sent off (straight red) |
|---|---|---|---|---|---|---|---|---|---|---|---|
| 1 | 9 | FW | (England) Beth Mead | 1 | 1 | 1 | 0 | 0 | 0 | 2 | 1 |
| 2 | 15 | FW | (Republic of Ireland) Katie McCabe | 3 | 0 | 1 | 0 | 0 | 0 | 4 | 0 |
| 3 | 20 | DF | (Germany) Leonie Maier | 2 | 0 | 0 | 0 | 0 | 0 | 2 | 0 |
| 3 | 3 | DF | (England) Lotte Wubben-Moy | 2 | 0 | 0 | 0 | 0 | 0 | 2 | 0 |
| 3 | 6 | DF | (England) Leah Williamson | 2 | 0 | 0 | 0 | 0 | 0 | 2 | 0 |
| 3 | 13 | MF | (Switzerland) Lia Walti | 2 | 0 | 0 | 0 | 0 | 0 | 2 | 0 |
| 3 | 19 | FW | (Australia) Caitlin Foord | 2 | 0 | 0 | 0 | 0 | 0 | 2 | 0 |
| 8 | 16 | DF | (Switzerland) Noelle Maritz | 1 | 0 | 0 | 0 | 0 | 0 | 1 | 0 |
| 8 | 5 | DF | (Scotland) Jen Beattie | 1 | 0 | 0 | 0 | 0 | 0 | 1 | 0 |
| 8 | 8 | MF | (England) Jordan Nobbs | 1 | 0 | 0 | 0 | 0 | 0 | 1 | 0 |
| 8 | 14 | FW | (England) Nikita Parris ‡ | 0 | 0 | 1 | 0 | 0 | 0 | 1 | 0 |
| 8 | 7 | MF | (Netherlands) Danielle van de Donk | 1 | 0 | 0 | 0 | 0 | 0 | 1 | 0 |
| 8 | 14 | FW | (Netherlands) Jill Roord | 1 | 0 | 0 | 0 | 0 | 0 | 1 | 0 |
| 8 | 11 | FW | (Netherlands) Vivianne Miedema | 1 | 0 | 0 | 0 | 0 | 0 | 1 | 0 |
| Total | | | | 20 | 1 | 0 | 0 | 0 | 0 | 20 | 1 |

=== Clean sheets ===
| Rank | No. | Name | WSL | FA Cup | League Cup | Total |
|---|---|---|---|---|---|---|
| 1 | 18 | (Australia) Lydia Williams | 7 | 1 | 0 | 8 |
| 2 | 1 | (Austria) Manuela Zinsberger | 4 | 1 | 0 | 5 |
| 3 | 24 | (England) Fran Stenson | 0 | 0 | 1 | 1 |
| Total | | | 11 | 2 | 1 | 14 |

== Transfers, loans and other signings ==
=== Transfers in ===
| Announcement date | No. | Position | Player | From club |
|---|---|---|---|---|
| 2 July 2020 | 12 | DF | (Australia) Steph Catley | (Australia) Melbourne City |
| 3 July 2020 | 21 | MF | (Switzerland) Malin Gut | (Switzerland) Grasshopper |
| 8 July 2020 | 18 | GK | (Australia) Lydia Williams | (Australia) Melbourne City |
| 10 July 2020 | 16 | DF | (Switzerland) Noelle Maritz | (Germany) Wolfsburg |
| 11 September 2020 | 3 | DF | (England) Lotte Wubben-Moy | (United States) University of North Carolina |
| 7 January 2021 | 4 | DF | (England) Anna Patten | (United States) University of South Carolina |

=== Contract extensions ===
| Announcement date | No. | Position | Player | At Arsenal since |
|---|---|---|---|---|
| 29 June 2020 | 22 | DF | (Austria) Viktoria Schnaderbeck | 2018 |
| 5 February 2021 | 1 | GK | (Austria) Manuela Zinsberger | 2019 |
| 4 May 2021 | 15 | FW | (Republic of Ireland) Katie McCabe | 2015 |

=== Transfers out ===
| Announcement date | No. | Position | Player | To club |
|---|---|---|---|---|
| 4 June 2020 | 28 | MF | (Mexico) Silvana Flores | (England) Chelsea |
| 5 June 2020 | 16 | DF | (Republic of Ireland) Louise Quinn | (Italy) Fiorentina |
| 10 June 2020 | 18 | GK | (France) Pauline Peyraud-Magnin | (Spain) Atlético Madrid |
| 12 June 2020 | 2 | MF | (Denmark) Katrine Veje | (Sweden) FC Rosengård |
| 13 June 2020 | 3 | DF | (Scotland) Emma Mitchell | (England) Reading |
| 25 June 2020 | 9 | FW | (England) Danielle Carter | (England) Reading |
| 14 August 2020 | 26 | MF | (England) Ruby Grant | (England) West Ham United |
| 4 September 2020 | 27 | MF | (England) Melisa Filis | (England) London Bees |
| 3 February 2021 | 32 | DF | (England) Gracie Pearse | (England) Crystal Palace |
| 3 February 2021 | 33 | DF | (England) Gracie Garrad | (England) Crystal Palace |

=== Loans out ===
| Announcement date | No. | Position | Player | To club |
|---|---|---|---|---|
| 2 February 2021 | 30 | DF | (England) Ruby Mace | (England) Birmingham City |
| 15 March 2021 | 31 | DF | (England) Anouk Denton | (England) West Ham United |

== Club ==
=== Kits (2020-21) ===
Supplier: Adidas / Sponsor: Fly Emirates / Sleeve sponsor: Visit Rwanda

| Home | Home alt. | Away | Away alt. | Third | Goalkeeper 1 | Goalkeeper 3 |

==== Kit usage (2020-21) ====
| Kit | Combination | Usage | |
|---|---|---|---|
| Home | Red body; White sleeves; White shorts; Red socks | WSL | Reading (H); Bristol City (H); Tottenham Hotspur (H); Chelsea (H); Birmingham City (H); Everton (H); Manchester City (H); Manchester United (H); Tottenham Hotspur (A); Brighton & Hove Albion (H); West Ham United (H); Aston Villa (H) |
| Home | Red body; White sleeves; White shorts; Red socks | FA Cup | Gillingham (H) |
| Home | Red body; White sleeves; White shorts; Red socks | League Cup | Chelsea (A); London City Lionesses (A); Tottenham Hotspur (H) |
| Home alt. 1 | Red body; White sleeves; Red shorts; Red socks | WSL | Brighton & Hove Albion (A) |
| Away | Marble shirt; Marble sleeves; redcurrant shorts; White socks | WSL | Manchester United (A); Manchester City (A) |
| Away alt. 1 | Marble shirt; Marble sleeves; Redcurrant shorts; Redcurrant socks | WSL | West Ham United (A); Reading (A); Chelsea (A); Birmingham City (A); Everton (A) |
| Third | Navy body; Navy sleeves; Navy shorts; Navy socks | WSL | Aston Villa (A); Bristol City (A) |

==== Goalkeeper kit usage (2020-21) ====
| Kit | Combination | Usage | |
|---|---|---|---|
| Goalkeeper 1 | Green body; Green sleeves; Green shorts; Green socks | WSL | Reading (H); Bristol City (H); Brighton & Hove Albion (A); Tottenham Hotspur (H); Chelsea (H); Birmingham City (H); Everton (H); Manchester City (H); Manchester United (H); Tottenham Hotspur (A); Bristol City (A); Brighton & Hove Albion (H); West Ham United (H); Aston Villa (H) |
| Goalkeeper 1 | Green body; Green sleeves; Green shorts; Green socks | FA Cup | Gillingham (H) |
| Goalkeeper 1 | Green body; Green sleeves; Green shorts; Green socks | League Cup | Tottenham Hotspur (H) |
| Goalkeeper 3 | Orange shirt; Orange sleeves; Orange shorts; Orange socks | WSL | West Ham United (A); Manchester United (A); Manchester City (A); Reading (A); Chelsea (A); Aston Villa (A); Birmingham City (A); Everton (A) |
| Goalkeeper 3 | Orange shirt; Orange sleeves; Orange shorts; Orange socks | League Cup | Chelsea (A); London City Lionesses (A) |

=== Kits (2021-22) ===
Supplier: Adidas / Sponsor: Fly Emirates / Sleeve sponsor: Visit Rwanda

| Home | Home alt. | Away | Goalkeeper^{1} |

==== Kit usage (2021-22) ====
| Kit | Combination | Usage | |
|---|---|---|---|
| Home | Red body; White sleeves; White shorts; Red hooped socks | FA Cup | Tottenham Hotspur (H); Brighton & Hove Albion (H) |
| Home alt. | Red body; White sleeves; White shorts; Red socks | FA Cup | Chelsea (N) |
| Away | Yellow body; Yellow sleeves; Yellow shorts; Yellow socks | FA Cup | Crystal Palace (H) |

==== Goalkeeper kit usage (2021-22) ====
| Kit | Combination | Usage | |
|---|---|---|---|
| Goalkeeper 1 | Green body; Green sleeves; Green shorts; Green socks | FA Cup | Crystal Palace (H); Tottenham Hotspur (H); Brighton & Hove Albion (H); Chelsea (N) |

== Pre-season ==
| 2 August 2020 Friendly | Aston Villa | 0–4 | Arsenal | Birmingham |
| | | Report | | Stadium: Villa Park |
Note: Behind closed doors, no official scoreline released.

| 8 August 2020 Friendly | Arsenal | 5–0 | Charlton Athletic | London Colney |
| | | Report | | Stadium: Arsenal Training Centre |
Note: Behind closed doors, no official scoreline released.

| 13 August 2020 Friendly | Arsenal | 2–0 | Brighton & Hove Albion | London Colney |
| | | Report | | Stadium: Arsenal Training Centre |
Note: Behind closed doors, no official scoreline released.

== Competitions ==
=== Overall record ===
| Competition | First match | Last match | Starting round | Final position | Record | | | | | | | |
| Competition | First match | Last match | Starting round | Final position | Pld | W | D | L | GF | GA | GD | Win % |
|---|---|---|---|---|---|---|---|---|---|---|---|---|
| FA WSL | 6 September 2020 | 9 May 2021 | Matchday 1 | 3rd | 22 | 15 | 3 | 4 | 63 | 15 | +48 | 68.18 |
| Women's FA Cup | 18 April 2021 | 5 December 2021 | Fourth round | Runners-up | 5 | 4 | 0 | 1 | 27 | 4 | +23 | 80.00 |
| FA Women's League Cup | 7 October 2020 | 18 November 2020 | Group stage | Group stage | 3 | 1 | 1 | 1 | 7 | 6 | +1 | 33.33 |
| Total | | | | | 30 | 20 | 4 | 6 | 97 | 25 | +72 | 66.67 |

Source: FA WSL

=== FA WSL ===
==== League table ====
| Pos | Team | Pld | W | D | L | GF | GA | GD | Pts | Qualification or relegation |
|---|---|---|---|---|---|---|---|---|---|---|
| 1 | Chelsea (C) | 22 | 18 | 3 | 1 | 69 | 10 | +59 | 57 | Qualification for the Champions League group stage |
| 2 | Manchester City | 22 | 17 | 4 | 1 | 65 | 13 | +52 | 55 | Qualification for the Champions League second round |
| 3 | Arsenal | 22 | 15 | 3 | 4 | 63 | 15 | +48 | 48 | Qualification for the Champions League first round |
| 4 | Manchester United | 22 | 15 | 2 | 5 | 44 | 20 | +24 | 47 | |
| 5 | Everton | 22 | 9 | 5 | 8 | 39 | 30 | +9 | 32 | |

Source: FA WSL
Rules for classification: 1) Points; 2) Goal difference; 3) Number of goals scored.
(C) Champions

==== Results summary ====
| Overall | | | | | | | | Home | | | | | | Away | | | | | |
| Pld | W | D | L | GF | GA | GD | Pts | W | D | L | GF | GA | GD | W | D | L | GF | GA | GD |
|---|---|---|---|---|---|---|---|---|---|---|---|---|---|---|---|---|---|---|---|
| 21 | 15 | 2 | 4 | 63 | 15 | +48 | 47 | 8 | 1 | 1 | 30 | 6 | +24 | 7 | 1 | 3 | 33 | 9 | +24 |

Last updated: 5 May 2021.
Source: FA WSL

==== Results by matchday ====
| Matchday | 1 | 2 | 3 | 4 | 5 | 6 | 7 | 8 | 9 | 10 | 11 | 12 | 13 | 14 | 15 | 16 | 17 | 18 | 19 | 20 | 21 | 22 |
|---|---|---|---|---|---|---|---|---|---|---|---|---|---|---|---|---|---|---|---|---|---|---|
| Ground | H | A | H | A | H | A | H | H | A | H | A | H | A | A | A | H | A | A | H | H | A | H |
| Result | W | W | W | W | W | L | D | W | L | W | D | L | L | W | W | W | W | W | W | W | W | D |
| Position | 1 | 1 | 1 | 1 | 1 | 2 | 2 | 2 | 3 | 2 | 3 | 4 | 4 | 4 | 4 | 4 | 4 | 3 | 3 | 3 | 3 | 3 |

Updated to match(es) played on 5 May 2021. Source: FA WSL
W = Win; D = Draw; L = Loss

==== Matches ====
| 6 September 2020 1 | Arsenal | 6–1 | Reading | Borehamwood |
| 12:30 BST | Little 15'; Miedema 33', 78'; Roord 40', 63', 81'; Maritz (yellow card) 42'; Maier (yellow card) 86' | Report | Bruton (yellow card) 56'; Fishlock (yellow card) 60'; Harding (yellow card) 69'; Carter 89' | Stadium: Meadow Park; Referee: Amy Fearns |
Note: Match played behind closed doors due to the COVID-19 pandemic in the United Kingdom.

| 13 September 2020 2 | West Ham United | 1–9 | Arsenal | Dagenham |
| 15:00 BST | Daly (yellow card) 11'; Fisk (yellow card) 14'; Flaherty (yellow card) 17' (yellow-red card) 34'; Dali 27'; Leon (yellow card) 45+2' | Report | Roord 23', 52', 56'; Miedema 34', 54'; Little 40'; Mead 42'; Williamson 72'; Foord 86' | Stadium: Dagenham and Redbridge Stadium; Attendance: 734; Referee: Abigail Bryne |
Note: Pilot event for the return of spectators

| 4 October 2020 3 | Arsenal | 3–1 | Bristol City | Borehamwood |
| 14:00 BST | Nobbs 42'; Foord 50'; Miedema 86' | Report | Harrison 6' | Stadium: Meadow Park; Referee: Emily Heaslip |
Note: Match played behind closed doors due to the COVID-19 pandemic in the United Kingdom.

| 11 October 2020 4 | Brighton & Hove Albion | 0–5 | Arsenal | Crawley |
| 14:00 BST | | Report | Miedema 10', 90+3'; Van de Donk 36'; Beattie 48'; Wubben-Moy 82' | Stadium: Broadfield Stadium; Referee: Kirstie Dowle |
Note: Match played behind closed doors due to the COVID-19 pandemic in the United Kingdom.

| 18 October 2020 5 | Arsenal | 6–1 | Tottenham Hotspur | Borehamwood |
| 14:00 BST | McCabe 4' (yellow card) 75'; Miedema 7', 36', 41'; Foord 15', 64' | Report | Harrop (yellow card) 36'; Dean (penalty missed) 50' (yellow card) 61'; Percival (yellow card) 68'; León 77' | Stadium: Meadow Park; Referee: Abigail Byrne |
Note: Match played behind closed doors due to the COVID-19 pandemic in the United Kingdom.

| 8 November 2020 6 | Manchester United | 1–0 | Arsenal | Leigh |
| 14:30 GMT | Toone 83' | Report | Wubben-Moy (yellow card) 52' | Stadium: Leigh Sports Village; Referee: Peter Shacklady |
Note: Match played behind closed doors due to the COVID-19 pandemic in the United Kingdom.

| 15 November 2020 7 | Arsenal | 1–1 | Chelsea | Borehamwood |
| 14:30 GMT | Maier (yellow card) 33'; Mead 86' | Report | Ji (yellow card) 63'; Wubben-Moy 90' (o.g.) | Stadium: Meadow Park; Referee: Kirsty Dowie |
Note: Match played behind closed doors due to the COVID-19 pandemic in the United Kingdom.

| 6 December 2020 8 | Arsenal | 3–0 | Birmingham City | Borehamwood |
| 14:00 GMT | Little (penalty missed) 21' 87' (pen.); Foord 57'; Roord 62' | Report | Scott (yellow card) 43' | Stadium: Meadow Park; Referee: Christina Hattersley |
Note: Match played behind closed doors due to the COVID-19 pandemic in the United Kingdom.

| 13 December 2020 9 | Manchester City | 2–1 | Arsenal | Manchester |
| 14:30 GMT | Mewis 30'; Weir 90+4' | Report | Miedema 3'; Beattie (yellow card) 31'; McCabe (yellow card) 87'; Nobbs (yellow card) 90+2' | Stadium: Academy Stadium; Referee: Emily Heaslip |
Note: Match played behind closed doors due to the COVID-19 pandemic in the United Kingdom.

| 20 December 2020 10 | Arsenal | 4–0 | Everton | Borehamwood |
| 12:30 GMT | Nobbs 4'; Foord 10'; Beattie 61'; Mead 63' | Report | | Stadium: Meadow Park; Referee: Helen Conley |
Note: Match played behind closed doors due to the COVID-19 pandemic in the United Kingdom.

| 17 January 2021 11 | Reading | 1–1 | Arsenal | Reading |
| 14:00 GMT | Bruton 5' | Report | Miedema 40' | Stadium: Madejski Stadium |
Note: Match played behind closed doors due to the COVID-19 pandemic in the United Kingdom.

| 7 February 2021 12 | Arsenal | 1–2 | Manchester City | Borehamwood |
| 14:30 GMT | Foord 57' | Report | White 24'; Hemp 79' | Stadium: Meadow Park |
Note: Match played behind closed doors due to the COVID-19 pandemic in the United Kingdom.

| 10 February 2021 13 | Chelsea | 3–0 | Arsenal | Kingston upon Thames |
| 19:00 GMT | Harder 48', 58'; Kirby 90' | Report | Williamson (yellow card) 89' | Stadium: Kingsmeadow; Referee: Amy Fearn |
Note: Match played behind closed doors due to the COVID-19 pandemic in the United Kingdom.

| 28 February 2021 14 | Aston Villa | 0–4 | Arsenal | Walsall |
| 14:00 GMT | | Report | Miedema 58'; Nobbs 67'; McCabe 73'; Evans 88' | Stadium: Bescot Stadium; Referee: Lisa Benn |
Note: Match played behind closed doors due to the COVID-19 pandemic in the United Kingdom. Previously postponed due to COVID-19 infections and a frozen pitch.

| 7 March 2021 15 | Birmingham City | 0–4 | Arsenal | Burton |
| 14:00 GMT | | Report | Foord 37', 39'; Miedema 76'; Evans 90' | Stadium: St. George's Park; Referee: Jane Simms |
Note: Match played behind closed doors due to the COVID-19 pandemic in the United Kingdom.

| 19 March 2021 16 | Arsenal | 2–0 | Manchester United | Borehamwood |
| 18:30 GMT | M. Turner 3' (o.g.); McCabe (yellow card) 31'; Wubben-Moy 51'; Mead (yellow card) 52' (yellow-red card) 62'; Walti (yellow card) 79' | Report | | Stadium: Meadow Park; Referee: Amy Fearn |
Note: Match played behind closed doors due to the COVID-19 pandemic in the United Kingdom.

| 27 March 2021 17 | Tottenham Hotspur | 0–3 | Arsenal | Tottenham |
| 15:30 BST | | Report | Foord 26' (yellow card) 30'; Miedema 35'; McCabe 61' | Stadium: Tottenham Hotspur Stadium; Referee: Helen Conley |
Note: Match played behind closed doors due to the COVID-19 pandemic in the United Kingdom.

| 4 April 2021 18 | Bristol City | 0–4 | Arsenal | Bath |
| 14:00 BST | | Report | Miedema 4', 65'; Van de Donk 45+1'; Mead 63' | Stadium: Twerton Park; Referee: Sarah Garret |
Note: Match played behind closed doors due to the COVID-19 pandemic in the United Kingdom.

| 25 April 2021 19 | Arsenal | 2–0 | Brighton & Hove Albion | Borehamwood |
| 14:00 BST | Nobbs 27', 77'; Roord (yellow card) 73'; Van de Donk (yellow card) 86' | Report | | Stadium: Meadow Park |
Note: Match played behind closed doors due to the COVID-19 pandemic in the United Kingdom.

| 28 April 2021 20 | Arsenal | 2–0 | West Ham United | Borehamwood |
| 19:30 BST | Miedema 33'; Little 78'; Foord (yellow card) 51' | Report | | Stadium: Meadow Park; Attendance: 0 |
Note: Match played behind closed doors due to the COVID-19 pandemic in the United Kingdom.

| 2 May 2021 21 | Everton | 1–2 | Arsenal | Liverpool |
| 14:00 BST | Finnigan 74' (yellow card) 90+4'; Christiansen (yellow card) 90+1' | Report | McCabe 22'; Miedema (yellow card) 75'; Little 90+4' (pen.) | Stadium: Walton Hall Park; Attendance: 0 |
Note: Match played behind closed doors due to the COVID-19 pandemic in the United Kingdom.

| 9 May 2021 22 | Arsenal | 0–0 | Aston Villa | Borehamwood |
| 14:00 BST | | Report | | Stadium: Meadow Park; Attendance: 0 Referee: Abigail Byrne |
Note: Match played behind closed doors due to the COVID-19 pandemic in the United Kingdom.

=== FA Cup ===
As a member of the top two tiers, Arsenal entered the FA Cup in the fourth round.

| 18 April 2021 Fourth round | Arsenal | 10–0 | Gillingham | Borehamwood |
| 14:00 BST | Roord 7', 21', 42'; Mead 12', 89'; Little 15'; Miedema 16'; Patten 60'; Van de Donk 70'; Nobbs 72' | Report | | Stadium: Meadow Park |
Note: Match played behind closed doors due to the COVID-19 pandemic in the United Kingdom.

| 16 May 2021 Fifth round | Arsenal | 9–0 | Crystal Palace | Borehamwood |
| 15:00 BST | Little 6' (pen.); Mead 42'; Van de Donk 45'; Maritz 62', 88'; Nobbs 70'; Miedema 77'; Roord 86'; McCabe 90+1' | Report | | Stadium: Meadow Park |
Note: Match played behind closed doors due to the COVID-19 pandemic in the United Kingdom.

| 29 September 2021 Quarter-finals | Arsenal | 5–1 | Tottenham Hotspur | Borehamwood |
| 19:15 BST | Iwabuchi 15'; Tang 32' (o.g.); Foord 36', 73'; Parris 44' | Report | Williams 3' | Stadium: Meadow Park; Attendance: 1,563 |

| 31 October 2021 Semi-finals | Arsenal | 3–0 | Brighton & Hove Albion | Borehamwood |
| 16:45 GMT | Little 50'; Mead 54'; Williamson 76' | Report | Gibbons (yellow card); Connolly (yellow card) | Stadium: Meadow Park; Referee: Abigail Byrne |

| 5 December 2021 Final | Arsenal | 0–3 | Chelsea | Wembley |
| 14:00 GMT | Mead (yellow card) 8'; McCabe (yellow card) 66'; Parris (yellow card) 80' | Report | Kirby 3'; Cuthbert (yellow card) 45'; Kerr 56', 78' | Stadium: Wembley; Attendance: Helen Conley; Referee: 40,942 |

=== FA Women's League Cup ===
==== Group stage ====
| Pos | Team | Pld | W | WPEN | LPEN | L | GF | GA | GD | Pts | Qualification |
|---|---|---|---|---|---|---|---|---|---|---|---|
| 1 | Chelsea | 2 | 2 | 0 | 0 | 0 | 6 | 1 | +5 | 6 | Advanced to knock-out stage |
| 2 | Arsenal | 3 | 1 | 1 | 0 | 1 | 7 | 6 | +1 | 5 | Possible knock-out stage based on ranking |
| 3 | Tottenham Hotspur | 3 | 1 | 0 | 1 | 1 | 6 | 4 | +2 | 4 | |
| 4 | London City Lionesses | 2 | 0 | 0 | 0 | 2 | 0 | 8 | −8 | 0 | |

Source: thefa.com
Rules for classification: 1) Points; 2) Goal difference; 3) Number of goals scored; 4) Number of wins; 5) Head-to-head record

| 7 October 2020 Group stage | Chelsea | 4–1 | Arsenal | Kingston upon Thames |
| 19:00 BST | Eriksson 5'; Reiten 10', 15'; Ingle (yellow card) 42'; England 90' | Report | Foord 8'; Van de Donk (yellow card) 69' | Stadium: Kingsmeadow; Attendance: 0 Referee: Scott Jackson |
Note: Match played behind closed doors due to the COVID-19 pandemic in the United Kingdom.

| 4 November 2020 Group stage | London City Lionesses | 0–4 | Arsenal | Dartford |
| 19:30 GMT | | Report | Miedema 22', 28', 41', 54' | Stadium: Princes Park; Attendance: 0 Referee: Robert Whitton |
Note: Match played behind closed doors due to the COVID-19 pandemic in the United Kingdom.

| 18 November 2020 Group stage | Arsenal | 2–2 (5–4 p) | Tottenham Hotspur | Borehamwood |
| 19:30 GMT | Miedema 12'; Wälti (yellow card) 61'; Foord 71'; Mead (yellow card) 76' | Report | Ayane (yellow card) 53'; Percival 59'; Zadorsky 88' | Stadium: Meadow Park; Attendance: 0 Referee: Amy Fearn |
| | Penalties |
| | McCabe (penalty scored); Wubben-Moy (penalty scored); Beattie (penalty scored); Foord (penalty scored); Wälti (penalty scored) | | (penalty scored) Quinn; (penalty scored) Percival; (penalty scored) Kennedy; (penalty scored) Davison; (penalty missed) Morgan |
Note: Match played behind closed doors due to the COVID-19 pandemic in the United Kingdom.

== Personal awards ==
=== Arsenal Women Player of the Season ===
- First place: Katie McCabe
- Second place: Vivianne Miedema
- Third place: Leah Williamson

== See also ==
- List of Arsenal W.F.C. seasons
- 2020–21 in English football
