= 2016 FA WSL Cup =

Tournament details
- Country: England
- Dates: 8 May 2016 – 2 October 2016
- Teams: 19

Final positions
- Champions: Manchester City
- Runners-up: Birmingham City

Tournament statistics
- Matches played: 18
- Goals scored: 56 (3.11 per match)
- Attendance: 13,454 (747 per match)
- Top goal scorer(s): (England) Nikita Parris Manchester City (Scotland) Jane Ross Manchester City (England) Fara Williams Arsenal (3 Goals Each)

The 2016 FA WSL Cup was the sixth edition of the FA WSL's league cup competition. It was sponsored by Continental AG, who sponsored the competition from its creation, and was officially known as the FA WSL Continental Tyres Cup. All 19 teams of the two divisions of the WSL took part in the competition.

Arsenal were the defending champions; only they and Manchester City had won the cup in the previous five seasons it was contested in.

The format was changed to a true knock-out tournament. With 19 entrants, the bottom six teams played a preliminary round. The round of 16 following that was seeded, so WSL 1 teams met WSL 2 teams, who had home advantage.

== Preliminary round ==
Team 1	Score	Team 2
8 May 2016
Sheffield	3–1	Durham
Oxford United	1–0	Millwall Lionesses
Watford	0–2	London Bees

8 May 2016

Sheffield	3–1	Durham
Johnson 29'; Flanagan 85'; Dale 88'	Report	Lee 85'

Home of Football, Sheffield

8 May 2016

Oxford United	1–0	Millwall Lionesses
Timms 79'	Report

Northcourt Road, Abingdon
Attendance: 405

8 May 2016

Watford	0–2	London Bees
	Report	Goddard 45'; Watts 48'

Broadwater, Berkhamsted

== First round ==
Team 1	Score	Team 2
2 July 2016
Aston Villa	0–8	Manchester City
Everton	0–1	Liverpool
Reading	1–3	Arsenal
London Bees	3–3 (4–2 p)	Chelsea
Sheffield	2–0	Bristol City
3 July 2016
Doncaster Rovers Belles	2–1	Sunderland
Oxford United	0–2	Birmingham City
Yeovil Town	1–3	Notts County

2 July 2016

Aston Villa	0–8	Manchester City
	Report	Parris 9', 18', 59'; Ross 17', 90'; Middag 32'; Corboz 79'; Scott 90'

Central Ground, Sutton Coldfield
Attendance: 492
Referee: Sarah Garrett

2 July 2016

Everton	0–1	Liverpool
		Lundh 45'

Select Security Stadium, Widnes
Attendance: 1,033

2 July 2016

Reading	1–3	Arsenal
Follis 66'	Report	Losada 47'; Williams 50', 64' (pen.)

The Hive Stadium, Canons Park
Attendance: 1,034

2 July 2016

London Bees	3–3 (a.e.t.)	Chelsea
Flaherty 58' (o.g.); Wilson 80'; Cooper 114'	Report	England 8', 95'; Bright 90+2'
Penalties
Beckett (penalty missed); Watts (penalty scored); Goddard (penalty scored); Cooper (penalty scored); Will (penalty scored)	4–2	(penalty scored) Davison; (penalty missed) Carney; (penalty missed) So-Yun; (penalty scored) Flaherty

The Hive Stadium, Canons Park
Attendance: 763

2 July 2016

Sheffield	2–0	Bristol City
Michalska 58'; Flanagan 81'

Home of Football Stadium, Sheffield
Attendance: 138

3 July 2016

Doncaster Rovers Belles	2–1	Sunderland
Little 22'; Cresswell	Report	Ramshaw 62'

Home of Football Stadium, Sheffield
Attendance: 188
Referee: Jane Simms

3 July 2016

Oxford United	0–2	Birmingham City
	Report	Hegerberg (pen.); Lawley

Northcourt Stadium, Abingdon
Attendance: 454

3 July 2016

Yeovil Town	1–3	Notts County
Lawrence 75'		White 2', 23'; Whelan 65'

Raleigh Grove, Sherborne
Attendance: 406

== Quarter-finals ==
Team 1	Score	Team 2
5 August 2016
Arsenal	3–2	Notts County
7 August 2016
Birmingham City	1–0 (a.e.t.)	Liverpool
Manchester City	4–1	Doncaster Rovers Belles
Sheffield	0–2	London Bees

5 August 2016

Arsenal	3–2	Notts County
Stoney 9'; Smith 82'; Williams 90' (pen.)	Report	Whelan 40'; Clarke 52'

The Hive, Canons Park
Attendance: 421

7 August 2016

Birmingham City	1–0 (a.e.t.)	Liverpool
Haines 120+1'

Damson Park, Solihull
Attendance: 712

7 August 2016
14:00 BST

Manchester City	4–1	Doncaster Rovers Belles
Christiansen 38'; Stanway 76'; Duggan 82'; Ross 88'	Report	Mathews 80'

Academy Stadium, Manchester
Attendance: 1,153
Referee: Anthony Backhouse

7 August 2016

Sheffield	0–2	London Bees
		Goddard 63'; Clarke 90'

Home of Football, Sheffield

== Semi-finals ==
Played on 3 and 4 September 2016.

Team 1	Score	Team 2
London Bees	0–4	Birmingham City
Manchester City	1–0	Arsenal

3 September 2016

London Bees	0–4	Birmingham City
		Linnett 26'; Harrop 53'; Wellings 84'; Davies 90' (o.g.)

The Hive, Canons Park
Attendance: 398

4 September 2016

Manchester City	1–0	Arsenal
Beattie 79'	Report

Academy Stadium, Manchester
Attendance: 1,643

== Final ==
Played on 2 October 2016. Manchester City won their second cup after 2014 and completed a double.

Team 1	Score	Team 2
Manchester City	1–0 (a.e.t.)	Birmingham City

2 October 2016

Manchester City	1–0 (a.e.t.)	Birmingham City
Bronze 104'	Report

Academy Stadium, Manchester
Attendance: 4,214
Referee: Rebecca Welch
