= Ashleigh Goddard =

English association football player

Personal information
- Full name: Ashleigh Jane Goddard
- Date of birth: 19 April 1992 (age 34)
- Position: Midfielder

Team information
- Current team: Stevenage
- Number: 23

Youth career
- 2000–2010: Arsenal

College career
Years	Team	Apps	(Gls)
2010–2013	DePaul Blue Demons	76	(11)

Senior career*
Years	Team	Apps	(Gls)
2014–2015	Reading		
2015–2018	London Bees		
2018	FC Nordsjælland		
2018–2019	Apollon Ladies		
2019–2021	Crystal Palace	2+	(0+)
2022–2023	London Bees	20	(1)
2023–2024	AFC Wimbledon		
2024–2025	Queens Park Rangers		
2025–	Stevenage		

International career
- England U17
- * Club domestic league appearances and goals

Ashleigh Jane Goddard (born 19 April 1992) is an English footballer who plays for Stevenage. She previously played for London Bees and Crystal Palace. Goddard started her career at Arsenal.

As a child Ashleigh Goddard won the reality show Wayne Rooney's Street Striker.

== Club career ==
She began her career in the youth academy at Arsenal between 2000 and 2010.

She joined FA Women's National League Division One South East club Queens Park Rangers in summer 2024. She joined Stevenage in July 2025.

== International career ==
Goddard represented England U17.
