= 2016 FA WSL 1 =

Sixth season of the top English women's association football league

FA WSL 1
- Season: 2016
- Champions: Manchester City
- Relegated: Doncaster Rovers Belles
- Champions League: Manchester City; Chelsea
- Matches: 72
- Goals: 212 (2.94 per match)
- Top goalscorer: Eniola Aluko (9 goals)
- Biggest home win: Manchester City 6–0 Doncaster Rovers Belles (2 May 2016)
- Biggest away win: Sunderland 0–5 Chelsea (30 June 2016)
- Highest scoring: Chelsea 6–3 Liverpool (8 May 2016)
- Highest attendance: 4,096; Manchester City 2–0 Chelsea (25 September 2016)
- Average attendance: 1,128

The 2016 FA WSL 1 was the sixth edition of the FA WSL since it was formed in 2010. The WSL 1 was expanded to nine teams. The season started on 23 March and Chelsea were the defending WSL 1 champions.

Manchester City won their first ever WSL 1 championship on 25 September 2016 with a 2–0 win over Chelsea.

== Teams ==
Locations of the 2016 Super League teams

Team	Location	Ground	Capacity	2015 season
Arsenal	Borehamwood	Meadow Park	4,502	3rd
Birmingham City	Solihull	Damson Park	3,050	6th
Chelsea	Staines	Wheatsheaf Park	3,009	1st
Doncaster Rovers Belles	Doncaster	Keepmoat Stadium	15,231	2nd, WSL 2
Liverpool	Widnes	Halton Stadium	13,350	7th
Manchester City	Manchester	Academy Stadium	7,000	2nd
Notts County	Nottingham	Meadow Lane	20,229	5th
Reading	High Wycombe	Adams Park	10,000	1st, WSL 2
Sunderland	Hetton-le-Hole	Eppleton Colliery Welfare Ground	2,500	4th

== Table ==
Pos	Team	Pld	W	D	L	GF	GA	GD	Pts	Qualification or relegation
1	Manchester City (C)	16	13	3	0	36	4	+32	42	Qualification for the Champions League knockout phase
2	Chelsea	16	12	1	3	42	17	+25	37	Qualification for the Champions League knockout phase
3	Arsenal	16	10	2	4	33	14	+19	32	
4	Birmingham City	16	7	6	3	18	13	+5	27	
5	Liverpool	16	7	4	5	27	23	+4	25	
6	Notts County	16	4	4	8	16	26	−10	16	
7	Sunderland	16	2	4	10	17	41	−24	10	
8	Reading	16	1	6	9	15	26	−11	9	
9	Doncaster Rovers (R)	16	1	0	15	8	48	−40	3	Relegation to the FA WSL 2

Source: FA WSL
Rules for classification: 1) Points; 2) Goal difference; 3) Number of goals scored
(C) Champions; (R) Relegated

== Results ==
Home \ Away	ARS	BIR	CHE	DON	LIV	MCI	NTC	REA	SUN
Arsenal		0–0	0–2	2–0	1–2	0–1	2–0	3–1	5–1
Birmingham City	0–0		0–4	2–1	2–1	0–2	1–0	0–0	1–0
Chelsea	1–2	1–1		4–0	6–3	0–2	2–1	3–2	2–1
Doncaster Rovers Belles	0–5	0–1	1–4		1–3	0–4	1–2	1–4	1–4
Liverpool	3–5	1–0	1–2	1–0		0–0	0–0	2–0	2–2
Manchester City	2–0	1–1	2–0	6–0	1–1		1–0	2–0	3–0
Notts County	0–2	0–1	1–3	2–1	3–2	1–5		2–2	2–1
Reading	1–2	1–1	0–3	0–1	0–1	1–2	1–1		1–1
Sunderland	0–4	1–7	0–5	4–0	0–4	0–2	1–1	1–1	

Updated to match(es) played on 30 October 2016. Source: FA WSL
Legend: Blue = home team win; Yellow = draw; Red = away team win.

== Top goalscorers ==
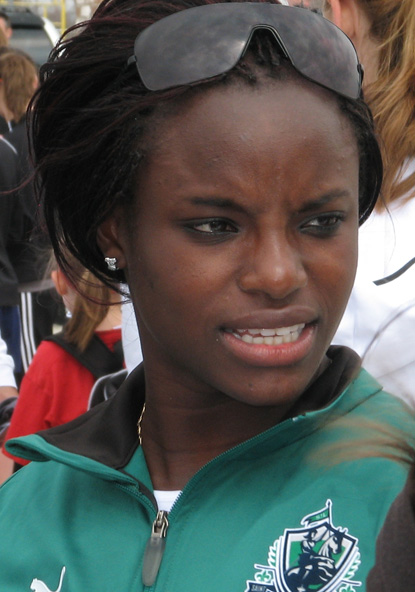
Top goalscorer Eniola Aluko in 2009

As of 16 January 2017.

Rank	Player	Team	Goals
1	(England) Eniola Aluko	Chelsea	9
2	(Scotland) Jane Ross	Manchester City	8
3	(Scotland) Caroline Weir	Liverpool	7
4	(England) Danielle Carter	Arsenal	6
5	(England) Fran Kirby	Chelsea	5
5	(England) Beth Mead	Sunderland	5
5	(England) Katie Chapman	Chelsea	5
5	(England) Toni Duggan	Manchester City	5
5	(England) Jessica Clarke	Notts County	5
5	(South Korea) Ji So-yun	Chelsea	5

== Awards ==
=== Annual awards ===
Award	Winner	Club
PFA Women's Players' Player of the Year	(England) Lucy Bronze	Manchester City
PFA Women's Young Player of the Year	(England) Jess Carter	Birmingham City
FA WSL 1 Players' Player of the Year	(England) Lucy Bronze	Manchester City
FA WSL Manager of the Year	Nick Cushing	Manchester City
FA WSL 1 Top Goalscorer	(England) Eniola Aluko	Chelsea
Vauxhall England Women's Player of the Year	(England) Jordan Nobbs	Arsenal
Vauxhall England Women's Young Player of the Year	(England) Millie Bright	Chelsea
FA WSL Goal of the Season	(Scotland) Claire Emslie	Bristol City

PFA WSL Team of the Year
Goalkeeper	(England) Mary Earps (Reading)			
Defenders	(England) Lucy Bronze (Manchester City)	(Scotland) Jennifer Beattie (Manchester City)	(England) Steph Houghton (Manchester City)	(England) Jess Carter (Birmingham City)
Midfielders	(England) Karen Carney (Chelsea)	(England) Jill Scott (Manchester City)	(England) Jordan Nobbs (Arsenal)	(Scotland) Caroline Weir (Liverpool)
Forwards	(Scotland) Jane Ross (Manchester City)		(England) Eniola Aluko (Chelsea)	

== See also ==
- 2016 FA WSL Cup
- 2016 FA WSL 2
