= 2020–21 FA Women's League Cup =

Tournament details
- Country: England
- Dates: 7 October 2020 – 14 March 2021
- Teams: 23

Final positions
- Champions: Chelsea (2nd title)
- Runners-up: Bristol City

Tournament statistics
- Matches played: 38
- Goals scored: 137 (3.61 per match)
- Top goal scorer: (England) Bianca Baptiste Crystal Palace (6 Goals)

The 2020–21 FA Women's League Cup was the tenth edition of the FA Women's Super League and FA Women's Championship's league cup competition. It was sponsored by Continental AG, who sponsored the competition since its creation, and was officially known as the FA Women's Continental League Cup for sponsorship reasons. All 23 teams from the FA Women's Super League and FA Women's Championship took part in the competition. Chelsea were the defending champions and successfully defended the title by beating Bristol City in the final.

== Format changes ==
As a result of the COVID-19 pandemic, the start of the 2020–21 season was delayed, forcing many leagues and competitions to shorten their format. To reduce the total number of games, the previous format of four groups of six (with one being reduced in size by one to suit the total of 23 teams) was altered to six groups of four (with one short again), reducing the number of group stage games from five each to three each. With six group winners now, only the two best second place teams qualified for the knock-out round.

== Group stage ==
=== Group A ===
Pos	Team	Pld	W	WPEN	LPEN	L	GF	GA	GD	Pts	Qualification	AST	DUR	SHU	COV
1	Aston Villa	3	2	1	0	0	11	1	+10	8	Advanced to knock-out stage	—	—	1–0	—
2	Durham	3	2	0	1	0	12	3	+9	7	Possible knock-out stage based on ranking	1–1	—	—	5–2
3	Sheffield United	3	1	0	0	2	4	7	−3	3		—	0–6	—	—
4	Coventry United	3	0	0	0	3	2	18	−16	0		0–9	—	0–4	—

Source: thefa.com
Rules for classification: 1) Points; 2) Goal difference; 3) Number of goals scored; 4) Number of wins; 5) Head-to-head record
7 October 2020

Durham	5–2	Coventry United
Hepple 38', 44' (pen.), 60'; Sharpe 56'; Galloway 87'		Dermody 20'; Anderson 84'

Maiden Castle, Durham
Attendance: Behind-closed-doors
7 October 2020
19:30

Aston Villa	1–0	Sheffield United
Hutton 38' (pen.)

Bescot Stadium, Walsall
Attendance: Behind-closed-doors
Referee: Elizabeth Simms

4 November 2020

Sheffield United	0–6	Durham
		Hill 45+1' (pen.); Gears 58'; Roberts 60'; Robson 67'; Galloway 75'; Sharpe 80'

Technique Stadium, Chesterfield
Attendance: Behind-closed-doors
Referee: Christina Hattersley
10 November 2020

Coventry United	0–9	Aston Villa
		Hanssen 7', 11', 28'; Syme 19'; Follis 50' (pen.); Silva 56', 90+4'; Hayles 71', 75'

Butts Park Arena, Coventry
Attendance: Behind-closed-doors
Referee: Amy Fearn

19 November 2020

Durham	1–1	Aston Villa
Roberts 4'		Follis 73'
Penalties
Wilson (penalty scored); Hepple (penalty missed); Lambert (penalty missed); Briggs (penalty scored)	2–4	(penalty missed) Follis; (penalty scored) Hanssen; (penalty scored) Siems; (penalty scored) Larsen; (penalty scored) Haigh

Maiden Castle, Durham
Attendance: Behind-closed-doors
Referee: Christiana Hattersley
19 November 2020

Coventry United	0–4	Sheffield United
		Little 9'; Wilkinson 33'; Pennock 66'; Johnson 77'

Butts Park Arena, Coventry
Attendance: Behind-closed-doors
Referee: Callum Parke

=== Group B ===
Pos	Team	Pld	W	WPEN	LPEN	L	GF	GA	GD	Pts	Qualification	CHE	ARS	TOT	LCL
1	Chelsea	2	2	0	0	0	6	1	+5	6	Advanced to knock-out stage	—	4–1	2–0	—
2	Arsenal	3	1	1	0	1	7	6	+1	5	Possible knock-out stage based on ranking	—	—	2–2	—
3	Tottenham Hotspur	3	1	0	1	1	6	4	+2	4		—	—	—	4–0
4	London City Lionesses	2	0	0	0	2	0	8	−8	0		C–C (Note: Match originally postponed following three positive COVID-19 tests by London City Lionesses players. An independent tribunal determined the fixture would not be rescheduled as it would have no effect on qualifying.)	0–4	—	—

Source: thefa.com
Rules for classification: 1) Points; 2) Goal difference; 3) Number of goals scored; 4) Number of wins; 5) Head-to-head record
7 October 2020

Tottenham Hotspur	4–0	London City Lionesses
Percival 12'; Kennedy 29'; Ayane 35'; Addison 82'

The Hive, Canons Park
Attendance: Behind-closed-doors
Referee: Sarah Garratt
7 October 2020

Chelsea	4–1	Arsenal
Eriksson 5'; Reiten 10', 15'; England 90'		Foord 8'

Kingsmeadow, Kingston upon Thames
Attendance: Behind-closed-doors
Referee: Scott Jackson

3 November 2020

Chelsea	2–0	Tottenham Hotspur
Cuthbert 70'; Leupolz 84'

Kingsmeadow, Kingston upon Thames
Attendance: Behind-closed-doors
Referee: Emily Heaslip
4 November 2020

London City Lionesses	0–4	Arsenal
		Miedema 22', 28', 41', 54'

Princes Park, Dartford
Attendance: Behind-closed-doors

18 November 2020

Arsenal	2–2	Tottenham Hotspur
Miedema 12'; Foord 71'		Percival 59'; Zadorsky 88'
Penalties
McCabe (penalty scored); Wubben-Moy (penalty scored); Beattie (penalty scored); Foord (penalty scored); Wälti (penalty scored)	5–4	(penalty scored) Quinn; (penalty scored) Percival; (penalty scored) Kennedy; (penalty scored) Davison; (penalty missed) Morgan

Meadow Park, Borehamwood
Attendance: Behind-closed-doors
Referee: Amy Fearn
18 November 2020

London City Lionesses	Cancelled	Chelsea

Princes Park, Dartford
Attendance: Behind-closed-doors

=== Group C ===
Pos	Team	Pld	W	WPEN	LPEN	L	GF	GA	GD	Pts	Qualification	MCI	EVE	LIV	MNU
1	Manchester City	3	2	0	1	0	6	1	+5	7	Advanced to knock-out stage	—	3–1	—	—
2	Everton	3	2	0	0	1	3	3	0	6	Possible knock-out stage based on ranking	—	—	1–0	1–0
3	Liverpool	3	1	0	0	2	3	5	−2	3		0–3	—	—	3–1
4	Manchester United	3	0	1	0	2	1	4	−3	2		0–0	—	—	—

Source: thefa.com
Rules for classification: 1) Points; 2) Goal difference; 3) Number of goals scored; 4) Number of wins; 5) Head-to-head record
7 October 2020
14:00

Liverpool	3–1	Manchester United
Furness 33' (pen.), 83'; Babajide 72' (pen.)		McManus 28'

Prenton Park, Birkenhead
Attendance: Behind-closed-doors
Referee: Rebecca Walsh
7 October 2020
19:00

Manchester City	3–1	Everton
Lavelle 51'; Kelly 76'; Park 90+2'		Turner 20'

Academy Stadium, Manchester
Attendance: Behind-closed-doors
Referee: Simon Mather

4 November 2020
14:00

Liverpool	0–3	Manchester City
		Coombs 42'; Lavelle 52'; Park 90+2'

Prenton Park, Birkenhead
Attendance: Behind-closed-doors
Referee: Sarah Garratt
18 November 2020
19:00

Everton	1–0	Liverpool
Christiansen 6'

Walton Hall Park, Walton Hall Park
Attendance: Behind-closed-doors

19 November 2020
19:00

Manchester United	0–0	Manchester City
Penalties
Toone (penalty scored); Groenen (penalty scored); M. Turner (penalty scored); Ladd (penalty scored)	4–3	(penalty scored) Mewis; (penalty missed) Coombs; (penalty scored) Beckie; (penalty scored) Stanway; (penalty missed) Greenwood

Leigh Sports Village, Leigh
Attendance: Behind-closed-doors
Referee: Helen Conley
16 December 2020
19:20

Everton	1–0	Manchester United
Graham 74'

Walton Hall Park, Walton Hall Park
Attendance: Behind-closed-doors
Referee: Ed Duckworth

=== Group D ===
Pos	Team	Pld	W	WPEN	LPEN	L	GF	GA	GD	Pts	Qualification	WHU	REA	BHA	CHA
1	West Ham United	3	2	1	0	0	9	2	+7	8	Advanced to knock-out stage	—	3–0	—	—
2	Reading	3	2	0	0	1	6	3	+3	6	Possible knock-out stage based on ranking	—	—	—	4–0
3	Brighton & Hove Albion	2	0	0	1	1	2	4	−2	1		2–2	0–2	—	—
4	Charlton Athletic	2	0	0	0	2	0	8	−8	0		0–4	—	C–C (Note: Match originally postponed following positive COVID-19 test by Brighton staff. An independent tribunal determined the fixture would not be rescheduled as it would have no effect on qualifying.)	—

Source: thefa.com
Rules for classification: 1) Points; 2) Goal difference; 3) Number of goals scored; 4) Number of wins; 5) Head-to-head record
7 October 2020
19:30

Brighton & Hove Albion	2–2	West Ham United
Connolly 42'; Jarrett 61'
Penalties
Jarrett (penalty missed); Heroum (penalty scored); Williams (penalty scored); Bowman (penalty missed)	2–4	(penalty scored) Van Egmond; (penalty scored) Grant; (penalty missed) Daly; (penalty scored) Pacheco; (penalty scored) Lehmann

Broadfield Stadium, Crawley
Attendance: Behind-closed-doors
Referee: Steven Hughes
7 October 2020
19:30

Reading	4–0	Charlton Athletic
Carter 27'; Harding 68', 70'; Chaplen 90+2'

Madejski Stadium, Reading
Attendance: Behind-closed-doors

4 November 2020
19:30

West Ham United	3–0	Reading
Lehmann 14'; van Egmond 51'; Daly 58'

Victoria Road, Dagenham
Attendance: Behind-closed-doors
Referee: Aji Ajibola
4 November 2020
19:45

Charlton Athletic	Cancelled	Brighton & Hove Albion

The Oakwood, Crayford
Attendance: Behind-closed-doors

18 November 2020
19:30

Brighton & Hove Albion	0–2	Reading
		Harding 28'; Eikeland 73'

Broadfield Stadium, Crawley
Attendance: Behind-closed-doors
Referee: Ryan Atkin
18 November 2020
19:45

Charlton Athletic	0–4	West Ham United
		van Egmond 3'; Kiernan 45', 50'; Thomas 64'

The Oakwood, Crayford
Attendance: Behind-closed-doors
Referee: Luke Donaldson

=== Group E ===
Pos	Team	Pld	W	WPEN	LPEN	L	GF	GA	GD	Pts	Qualification	LEI	BIR	BLB
1	Leicester City	2	1	1	0	0	5	2	+3	5	Advanced to knock-out stage	—	—	5–2
2	Birmingham City	2	1	0	1	0	1	0	+1	4	Possible knock-out stage based on ranking	0–0	—	—
3	Blackburn Rovers	2	0	0	0	2	2	6	−4	0		—	0–1	—

Source: thefa.com
Rules for classification: 1) Points; 2) Goal difference; 3) Number of goals scored; 4) Number of wins; 5) Head-to-head record
7 October 2020
19:45

Blackburn Rovers	0–1	Birmingham City
		Walker 81'

Irongate, Bamber Bridge
Attendance: Behind-closed-doors
4 November 2020
19:45

Leicester City	5–2	Blackburn Rovers
Flint 5', 32'; Devlin 78'; Bailey-Gayle 81'; McDonald 90+4' (o.g.)		Hughes 51'; Newsham 57'

Farley Way Stadium, Quorn
Attendance: Behind-closed-doors
Referee: Georgia Ball
9 December 2020
14:00

Birmingham City	0–0	Leicester City
Penalties
Murray (penalty scored); Walker (penalty scored); Hampton (penalty scored); Brougham (penalty scored); Corsie (penalty scored); Scofield (penalty missed)	5–6	(penalty scored) Allen; (penalty scored) Devlin; (penalty scored) Smith; (penalty scored) Plumptre; (penalty scored) Blanchard; (penalty scored) Everett

Damson Park, Solihull
Attendance: Behind-closed-doors

=== Group F ===
Pos	Team	Pld	W	WPEN	LPEN	L	GF	GA	GD	Pts	Qualification	BRI	CRY	LON	LEW
1	Bristol City	3	3	0	0	0	11	3	+8	9	Advanced to knock-out stage	—	—	4–0	—
2	Crystal Palace	3	2	0	0	1	10	6	+4	6	Possible knock-out stage based on ranking	2–4	—	6–1	—
3	London Bees	3	1	0	0	2	2	10	−8	3		—	—	—	1–0
4	Lewes	3	0	0	0	3	2	6	−4	0		1–3	1–2	—	—

Source: thefa.com
Rules for classification: 1) Points; 2) Goal difference; 3) Number of goals scored; 4) Number of wins; 5) Head-to-head record
7 October 2020
19:30

Bristol City	4–0	London Bees
Robert 10' (o.g.); Logarzo 12'; Salmon 80'; Wellings 82'

Twerton Park, Bath
Attendance: Behind-closed-doors
Referee: Dale Wootton
7 October 2020

Lewes	1–2	Crystal Palace
Jones 59'		Baptiste 76', 90'

The Dripping Pan, Lewes
Attendance: Behind-closed-doors

4 November 2020

London Bees	1–0	Lewes
Pickett 27'

The Hive Stadium, Edgware
Attendance: Behind-closed-doors
5 November 2020
19:45

Crystal Palace	2–4	Bristol City
Baptiste 55', 58'		Bissell 19'; Logarzo 30', 41'; Wellings 51'

Hayes Lane, Bromley
Attendance: Behind-closed-doors
Referee: Ryan Atkin

18 November 2020
19:45

Lewes	1–3	Bristol City
Cleverly 55'		Purfield 22'; Bissell 30'; Salmon 31'

The Dripping Pan, Lewes
Attendance: Behind-closed-doors
Referee: Chloe-Ann Anderson
19 November 2020

Crystal Palace	6–1	London Bees
Haines 14' (pen.); Baptiste 17', 58'; Nunn 30' (o.g.); Khassal 45'; Taylor 90'		Hazard 8'

Hayes Lane, Bromley
Attendance: Behind-closed-doors

=== Ranking of second-placed teams ===
Due to Group E containing one fewer team, the ranking to determine which two second-placed teams progress is calculated on a points-per-game basis.

Pos	Grp	Team	Pld	W	WPEN	LPEN	L	GF	GA	GD	Pts	PPG	Qualification
1	A	Durham	3	2	0	1	0	12	3	+9	7	2.33	Advanced to knock-out stage
2	F	Crystal Palace	3	2	0	0	1	10	6	+4	6	2.00	Advanced to knock-out stage
3	D	Reading	3	2	0	0	1	6	3	+3	6	2.00	
4	E	Birmingham City	2	1	0	1	0	1	0	+1	4	2.00	
5	C	Everton	3	2	0	0	1	3	3	0	6	2.00	
6	B	Arsenal	3	1	1	0	1	7	6	+1	5	1.67	

Source: thefa.com

== Knock-out stage ==
Quarter-finals
Bristol City	2
Aston Villa	1
Crystal Palace	0
Leicester City	1
Manchester City	2
Chelsea	4
West Ham United	3
Durham	0

Semi-finals
Bristol City	1
Leicester City	0
Chelsea	6
West Ham United	0

Final
Bristol City	0
Chelsea	6

=== Quarter-finals ===
The draw for this round was made live on BT Sport Score on 19 December 2020. The two teams that qualified as best placed runners-up could not be drawn against the teams that topped their respective groups meaning Bristol City were not eligible to face Crystal Palace and Durham could not be drawn with Aston Villa. Manchester City's match against Chelsea was postponed following a COVID-19 outbreak in the Manchester City first-team squad.

13 January 2021
19:30

Bristol City	2–1	Aston Villa
Salmon 55', 58'	Report	Larsen 86'

Twerton Park, Bath
Attendance: Behind-closed-doors
Referee: Robert Massey-Ellis

14 January 2021
20:00

Crystal Palace	0–1	Leicester City
	Report	Flint 89'

Hayes Lane, Bromley
Attendance: Behind-closed-doors

20 January 2021
17:30

Manchester City	2–4 (a.e.t.)	Chelsea
Kelly 52'; Hemp 85'	Report	Leupolz 43'; Charles 89'; Reiten 95'; Ingle 105'

Academy Stadium, Manchester
Attendance: Behind-closed-doors
Referee: Richie Watkins

21 January 2021
17:30

West Ham United	3–0	Durham
van Egmond 40'; Svitková 43'; Cissoko 84'	Report

Victoria Road, Dagenham
Attendance: Behind-closed-doors
Referee: Steven Hughes

=== Semi-finals ===
3 February 2021
15:00

Chelsea	6–0	West Ham United
Harder 4', 27', 86'; Ingle 15'; England 27'; Kirby 69'	Report

Kingsmeadow, Kingston upon Thames
Attendance: Behind-closed-doors
Referee: Stacey Pearson

3 February 2021
19:30

Bristol City	1–0	Leicester City
Skeels 72'	Report

Twerton Park, Bath
Attendance: Behind-closed-doors
Referee: Rebecca Welch

=== Final ===
On 28 January, it was announced the 2021 FA Women's League Cup final would be held at Vicarage Road, the home of Watford FC, for the first time. The game was televised live domestically on BT Sport 2 and internationally via the FA's own streaming service the FA Player.

14 March 2021
14:30 GMT

Bristol City	0–6	Chelsea
	Report	Kerr 2', 10', 48'; Kirby 28', 38'; Reiten 54'

Vicarage Road, Watford, Hertfordshire
Attendance: 0 (behind closed doors)
Referee: Abigail Byrne

== See also ==
- 2020–21 FA WSL
- 2020–21 FA Women's Championship
