= 2020–21 Aston Villa W.F.C. season =

Aston Villa
2020–21 season
- Owner: NSWE Group
- Chairman: Nassef Sawiris
- Manager: Gemma Davies (until 25 January); Marcus Bignot (interim) (from 25 January)
- Stadium: Bescot Stadium, Walsall
- FA WSL: 10th
- FA Cup: Fourth round
- League Cup: Quarter-final
- Top goalscorer: League: Ramona Petzelberger (3); All: Shania Hayles and Nadine Hanssen (4)
Home colours	Away colours	Third colours

The 2020–21 Aston Villa W.F.C. season was the club's 25th season under their Aston Villa affiliation and the organisation's 47th overall season in existence. It was their debut season in the FA Women's Super League following promotion from the Championship, and as a fully professional team. Along with competing in the WSL, the club also contested two domestic cup competitions: the FA Cup and the League Cup.

Ahead of the campaign the team relocated from the Trevor Brown Memorial Ground to Bescot Stadium in Walsall.

On 25 January 2021, it was announced Marcus Bignot had been appointed interim manager with the current coaching team, including head coach Gemma Davies, all retaining their positions parallel with the appointment.

== Current squad ==
As of 12 January 2021.

Note: Flags indicate national team as defined under FIFA eligibility rules; some limited exceptions apply. Players may hold more than one non-FIFA nationality.

No.	Pos.	Nation	Player
1	GK	ENG	Sian Rogers
3	DF	ENG	Asmita Ale
4	DF	ENG	Ella Franklin-Fraiture
5	DF	ENG	Elisha N'Dow
6	DF	ENG	Anita Asante
7	MF	ENG	Emma Follis
8	MF	SCO	Chloe Arthur
9	FW	DEN	Stine Larsen
10	MF	GER	Ramona Petzelberger
11	MF	ENG	Amy West
12	FW	ENG	Jodie Hutton
13	DF	GER	Caroline Siems

No.	Pos.	Nation	Player
14	MF	ENG	Emily Syme
15	DF	ENG	Natalie Haigh
16	DF	ENG	Olivia McLoughlin
17	FW	ENG	Sophie Haywood
19	FW	POR	Diana Silva
20	FW	JPN	Mana Iwabuchi
21	MF	GER	Marisa Ewers (captain)
22	FW	ENG	Shania Hayles
23	MF	NED	Nadine Hanssen
27	GK	ENG	Charlotte Clarke (Note: Dual registration with Derby County, remains eligible for Aston Villa when called upon)
29	GK	GER	Lisa Weiß

== Pre-season ==
2 August 2020 Friendly	Aston Villa	–	Arsenal	Aston
		Report		Stadium: Villa Park; Attendance: Behind-closed-doors
Note: No official scoreline released

16 August 2020 Friendly	Aston Villa	–	Manchester City	Bodymoor Heath
		Report		Stadium: Bodymoor Heath Training Ground; Attendance: Behind-closed-doors
Note: No official scoreline released

23 August 2020 Friendly	Manchester United	–	Aston Villa	Leigh
		Report		Stadium: Leigh Sports Village; Attendance: Behind-closed-doors
Note: No official scoreline released

== FA Women's Super League ==
=== Results summary ===
Overall								Home						Away					
Pld	W	D	L	GF	GA	GD	Pts	W	D	L	GF	GA	GD	W	D	L	GF	GA	GD
22	3	6	13	15	47	−32	15	1	3	7	5	25	−20	2	3	6	10	22	−12

Last updated: 9 May 2021.
Source: FA WSL

=== Results by matchday ===
Round	1	2	3	4	5	6	7	8	9	10	11	12	13	14	15	16	17	18	19	20	21	22
Ground	H	A	H	A	H	H	A	A	A	H	H	H	H	A	H	A	A	A	H	A	H	A
Result	L	L	L	W	L	L	W	L	L	D	L	W	L	L	L	L	L	D	D	D	D	D
Position	9	10	11	10	10	11	9	11	11	11	11	10	10	10	10	11	12	11	11	11	11	10

A = Away; H = Home; W = Win; D = Draw; L = Loss

=== Results ===
5 September 2020 1	Aston Villa	0–2	Manchester City	Aston
14:30		Report	Stanway 6', 21'	Stadium: Villa Park; Attendance: Behind-closed-doors; Referee: Abigail Byrne

13 September 2020 2	Reading	3–1	Aston Villa	Reading
14:00	Eikeland 24'; Bruton 40', (yellow card) 85'; Williams 45+3' (pen.); Harding (yellow card) 72'	Report	Siems (yellow card) 59'; Larsen 79' (pen.), (yellow card) 90+6'	Stadium: Madejski Stadium; Attendance: Behind-closed-doors; Referee: Emily Heaslip

3 October 2020 3	Aston Villa	0–6	Everton	Walsall
12:30		Report	Raso 21', 24'; Emslie 27', 53'; Gauvin 40'; Boye-Hlorkah 51'	Stadium: Bescot Stadium; Attendance: Behind-closed-doors; Referee: Kirsty Dowle

11 October 2020	Bristol City	P–P	Aston Villa	Bath
14:00				Stadium: Twerton Park
Note: Postponed following a positive COVID-19 test from an Aston Villa player

17 October 2020	Aston Villa	P–P	Chelsea	Walsall
12:30				Stadium: Bescot Stadium
Note: Postponed following a positive COVID-19 test from an Aston Villa player

8 November 2020 4	Brighton & Hove Albion	0–2	Aston Villa	Crawley
14:00	Simpkins (yellow card) 68'; Kerkdijk (yellow card) 82'; Bowman (yellow card) 84'; Connolly (yellow card) 88'	Report	Asante 59'; Hutton (yellow card) 71'; Petzelberger 90+2'	Stadium: Broadfield Stadium; Attendance: Behind-closed-doors; Referee: Stacey Pearson

14 November 2020 5	Aston Villa	0–1	Birmingham City	Aston
14:30	Hutton (yellow card) 38'	Report	Walker 72'; Scofield (yellow card) 76'	Stadium: Villa Park; Attendance: Behind-closed-doors; Referee: Rebecca Welch

5 December 2020 6	Aston Villa	0–2	Manchester United	Walsall
12:30	Arthur (yellow card) 90+3'	Report	Galton 25'; Toone 89'	Stadium: Bescot Stadium; Attendance: Behind-closed-doors; Referee: Abigail Byrne

9 December 2020 7	Bristol City	0–4	Aston Villa	Bath
18:30	Bryson (yellow card) 75'	Report	Petzelberger 42', 67', (yellow card) 64'; Hayles 57', 75'	Stadium: Twerton Park; Attendance: Behind-closed-doors; Referee: Amy Fearn
Note: Rescheduled from 11 October 2020, following positive a COVID-19 test from a Aston Villa player.

13 December 2020 8	Tottenham Hotspur	3–1	Aston Villa	Canons Park
14:00	Morgan 13' (pen.); Siems 36' (o.g.); Harrop (yellow card) 45+3'; Neville (yellow card) 61'; Ayane 63'	Report	Weiß (yellow card) 12'; Hanssen 24'	Stadium: The Hive; Attendance: Sarah Garratt

20 December 2020	West Ham United	P–P	Aston Villa	Dagenham
14:00				Stadium: Victoria Road
Note: Postponed following positive COVID-19 tests at the West Ham training ground

10 January 2021	Aston Villa	P–P	Arsenal	Walsall
14:00				Stadium: Bescot Stadium
Note: Postponed due to a COVID-19 case at Arsenal

17 January 2021 9	Manchester City	7–0	Aston Villa	Manchester
12:30	Hemp 2', 38'; Scott 17'; Stanway 31'; Haigh 40' (o.g.); White 45'; Kelly 79'	Report		Stadium: Academy Stadium; Attendance: Behind-closed-doors; Referee: Amy Fearn

23 January 2021 10	Aston Villa	2–2	Reading	Walsall
12:30	N'Dow (yellow card) 30'; Iwabuchi 55'; Larsen (yellow card) 80'; Silva 90+1'	Report	James 3'; Rowe 57'	Stadium: Bescot Stadium; Attendance: Behind-closed-doors; Referee: Kirsty Downie

27 January 2021 11	Aston Villa	0–4	Chelsea	Walsall
19:00	Hanssen (yellow card) 45'	Report	Kerr 3'; England 35'; Harder 68'; Eriksson 70'; Bright (yellow card) 71'	Stadium: Bescot Stadium; Attendance: Behind-closed-doors; Referee: Helen Conley
Note: Rescheduled from 17 October 2020 following positive COVID-19 test by Aston Villa player

31 January 2021	Aston Villa	P–P	Arsenal	Walsall
14:00				Stadium: Bescot Stadium
Note: Rescheduled from 10 January 2021 following positive COVID-19 case at Arsenal. Postponed due to waterlogged pitch.

6 February 2021 12	Aston Villa	1–0	Tottenham Hotspur	Walsall
12:30	Iwabuchi 12'; N'Dow (yellow card) 90+11'	Report	Mikalsen (yellow card) 67'; Kennedy (yellow card) 85'	Stadium: Bescot Stadium; Attendance: Behind-closed-doors; Referee: Elizabeth Simms

10 February 2021	Birmingham City	P–P	Aston Villa	Solihull
18:00				Stadium: Damson Park
Note: Postponed due to frozen pitch

14 February 2021	Aston Villa	P–P	Arsenal	Walsall
14:00				Stadium: Bescot Stadium
Note: Rescheduled from 31 January 2021 due to waterlogged pitch. Postponed due to frozen pitch.

28 February 2021 13	Aston Villa	0–4	Arsenal	Walsall
14:00	Hanssen (yellow card) 85'	Report	Miedema 58'; Nobbs 67'; McCabe 73'; Evans 88'	Stadium: Bescot Stadium; Attendance: Behind-closed-doors; Referee: Lisa Benn
Note: Rescheduled from 14 February 2021 due to frozen pitch

7 March 2021 14	Manchester United	3–0	Aston Villa	Leigh
12:00	Hanson 27'; Sigsworth 43'; Staniforth (yellow card) 45'; Zelem 73'	Report	N'Dow (yellow card) 71'	Stadium: Leigh Sports Village; Attendance: Behind-closed-doors; Referee: Helen Conley

17 March 2021 15	Aston Villa	0–2	Brighton & Hove Albion	Walsall
19:30	Arthur (yellow card) 45+3'; Hutton (yellow card) 65'; Weiß (yellow card) 80'	Report	Whelan 21'; Kaagman 81' (pen.)	Stadium: Bescot Stadium; Attendance: Behind-closed-doors; Referee: Helen Conley

28 March 2021 16	Chelsea	2–0	Aston Villa	Kingston upon Thames
14:30	Kerr 24', 57'	Report	McLoughlin (yellow card) 75'	Stadium: Kingsmeadow; Attendance: Behind-closed-doors; Referee: Sarah Garratt

4 April 2021 17	Everton	3–1	Aston Villa	Liverpool
13:00	Graham 36'; Christiansen 64' (pen.); Magill 78'	Report	Hutton (yellow card) 45'; Hanssen (yellow card) 67'; Ale (yellow card) 75'; Arthur (yellow card) 83', (goal) 90+4'	Stadium: Walton Hall Park; Attendance: Behind-closed-doors; Referee: Stacey Pearson

20 April 2021 18	West Ham United	0–0	Aston Villa	Dagenham
18:00	Vetterlein (yellow card) 23'; Cissoko (yellow card) 57'	Report	N'Dow (yellow card) 27'; Gregory (yellow card) 62'; Hutton (yellow card) 90+3'; Ale (yellow card) 90+5'	Stadium: Victoria Road; Attendance: Behind-closed-doors; Referee: Amy Fearn
Note: Rescheduled from 20 December 2020 following positive COVID-19 tests at the West Ham training ground

24 April 2021 19	Aston Villa	2–2	Bristol City	Walsall
12:30	Sargeant 3' (o.g.); N'Dow (yellow card) 15'; Haigh 35'; Asante (yellow card) 69'	Report	Evans (yellow card) 37'; Bryson 74'; Mastrantonio 90+5'	Stadium: Bescot Stadium; Attendance: Behind-closed-doors; Referee: Emily Heaslip

28 April 2021 20	Birmingham City	1–1	Aston Villa	Solihull
18:00	Kelly (yellow card) 33'; Mayling (yellow card) 40'; Sarri 90+6'	Report	Gregory 28'; Hutton (yellow card) 42'; Silva (yellow card) 90+4'	Stadium: Damson Park; Attendance: Behind-closed-doors; Referee: Jane Simms
Note: Rescheduled from 10 February 2021 due to frozen pitch

2 May 2021 21	Aston Villa	0–0	West Ham United	Walsall
12:30	Iwabuchi (yellow card) 60'	Report		Stadium: Bescot Stadium; Attendance: Behind-closed-doors; Referee: Rebecca Welch

9 May 2021 22	Arsenal	0–0	Aston Villa	Borehamwood
14:30		Report		Stadium: Meadow Park; Attendance: Behind-closed-doors; Referee: Abigail Byrne

=== League table ===
Pos	Team	Pld	W	D	L	GF	GA	GD	Pts	Qualification or relegation
8	Tottenham Hotspur	22	5	5	12	18	41	−23	20	
9	West Ham United	22	3	6	13	21	39	−18	15	
10	Aston Villa	22	3	6	13	15	47	−32	15	
11	Birmingham City	22	3	6	13	15	44	−29	14 (Note: On 7 May 2021, Birmingham City were deducted one point for fielding an ineligible player in a draw against Reading on 25 April 2021.)	
12	Bristol City (R)	22	2	6	14	18	72	−54	12	Relegation to the Championship

Source: FA WSL
Rules for classification: 1) Points; 2) Goal difference; 3) Number of goals scored.
(R) Relegated

== Women's FA Cup ==
As a member of the top two tiers, Aston Villa will enter the FA Cup in the fourth round proper. Originally scheduled to take place on 31 January 2021, it was delayed due to COVID-19 restrictions.

17 April 2021 Fourth round	Manchester City	8–0	Aston Villa	Manchester
13:00	Kelly 16', 41', 84'; White 34'; Beckie 50'; Stanway 59'; Lavelle 72'; Mewis 90'	Report		Stadium: Academy Stadium; Attendance: Behind-closed-doors

== FA Women's League Cup ==
=== Group stage ===
7 October 2020 Group stage	Aston Villa	1–0	Sheffield United	Walsall
19:30	Hutton 38' (pen.)	Report		Stadium: Bescot Stadium; Attendance: Behind-closed-doors; Referee: Elizabeth Simms

10 November 2020 Group stage	Coventry United	0–9	Aston Villa	Coventry
19:45	Hughes (yellow card) 61'; Gauntlett (yellow card) 80'	Report	Hanssen 7', 11', 28'; Syme 19'; Follis 50' (pen.); Silva 56', 90+4'; Hutton (yellow card) 65'; Hayles 71', 75'	Stadium: Butts Park Arena; Attendance: Behind-closed-doors; Referee: Amy Fearn
Note: Rescheduled from 3 November following positive COVID-19 cases in Coventry squad

19 November 2020 Group stage	Durham	1–1 (2–4 p)	Aston Villa	Durham
19:45	Roberts 4'	Report	Follis 73'; Arthur (yellow card) 90'	Stadium: Maiden Castle; Attendance: Behind-closed-doors; Referee: Christiana Hattersley
	Penalties
	Wilson (penalty scored); Hepple (penalty missed); Lambert (penalty missed); Briggs (penalty scored)		(penalty missed) Follis; (penalty scored) Hanssen; (penalty scored) Siems; (penalty scored) Larsen; (penalty scored) Haigh

Pos	Team	Pld	W	WPEN	LPEN	L	GF	GA	GD	Pts	Qualification	AST	DUR	SHU	COV
1	Aston Villa	3	2	1	0	0	11	1	+10	8	Advanced to knock-out stage	—	—	1–0	—
2	Durham	3	2	0	1	0	12	3	+9	7	Possible knock-out stage based on ranking	1–1	—	—	5–2
3	Sheffield United	3	1	0	0	2	4	7	−3	3		—	0–6	—	—
4	Coventry United	3	0	0	0	3	2	18	−16	0		0–9	—	0–4	—

Source: thefa.com
Rules for classification: 1) Points; 2) Goal difference; 3) Number of goals scored; 4) Number of wins; 5) Head-to-head record

=== Knockout stage ===
13 January 2021 Quarter-final	Bristol City	2–1	Aston Villa	Bath
19:30	Salmon 55', 58'	Report	Larsen 86'	Stadium: Twerton Park; Attendance: Behind-closed-doors; Referee: Robert Massey-Ellis

== Squad statistics ==
=== Appearances ===
As of 9 May 2021

Starting appearances are listed first, followed by substitute appearances after the + symbol where applicable.

No.	Pos	Nat	Player	Total		FA WSL		FA Cup		League Cup	
No.	Pos	Nat	Player	Apps	Goals	Apps	Goals	Apps	Goals	Apps	Goals
1	GK	(England) ENG	Sian Rodgers	4	0	1	0	1	0	2	0
3	DF	(England) ENG	Asmita Ale	23	0	16+2	0	1	0	4	0
4	DF	(England) ENG	Ella Franklin-Fraiture	11	0	10	0	0	0	1	0
5	DF	(England) ENG	Elisha N'Dow	25	0	16+4	0	1	0	3+1	0
6	DF	(England) ENG	Anita Asante	23	1	19	1	0	0	3+1	0
7	MF	(England) ENG	Emma Follis	19	2	9+6	0	0	0	2+2	2
8	MF	(Scotland) SCO	Chloe Arthur	19	1	15+2	1	0	0	1+1	0
9	FW	(Denmark) DEN	Stine Larsen	20	2	16+1	1	0+1	0	0+2	1
10	MF	(Germany) GER	Ramona Petzelberger	13	3	9+2	3	0	0	1+1	0
11	MF	(England) ENG	Amy West	10	0	2+4	0	1	0	3	0
12	FW	(England) ENG	Jodie Hutton	19	2	12+5	1	0	0	1+1	1
13	DF	(Germany) GER	Caroline Siems	17	0	10+3	0	1	0	3	0
14	MF	(England) ENG	Emily Syme	20	1	1+14	0	1	0	4	1
15	DF	(England) ENG	Natalie Haigh	22	1	18	1	1	0	2+1	0
16	DF	(England) ENG	Olivia McLoughlin	9	0	7+1	0	1	0	0	0
17	FW	(England) ENG	Sophie Haywood	10	0	3+5	0	0	0	1+1	0
18	MF	(England) ENG	Freya Gregory	10	1	4+5	1	1	0	0	0
19	FW	(Portugal) POR	Diana Silva	19	3	4+10	1	1	0	4	2
20	FW	(Japan) JPN	Mana Iwabuchi	14	2	11+2	2	0	0	0+1	0
21	MF	(Germany) GER	Marisa Ewers	22	0	16+3	0	0	0	2+1	0
22	FW	(England) ENG	Shania Hayles	23	4	13+6	2	1	0	2+1	2
23	MF	(Netherlands) NED	Nadine Hanssen	21	4	9+7	1	0+1	0	3+1	3
27	GK	(England) ENG	Charlotte Clarke	1	0	0	0	0	0	0+1	0
29	GK	(Germany) GER	Lisa Weiß	23	0	21	0	0	0	2	0

== Transfers ==
=== Transfers in ===
Date	Position	Nationality	Name	From	Ref.
2 July 2020	MF	(Scotland)	Chloe Arthur	(England) Birmingham City	
4 July 2020	DF	(England)	Freya Gregory	(England) Birmingham City	
6 July 2020	DF	(England)	Anita Asante	(England) Chelsea	
15 July 2020	FW	(Portugal)	Diana Silva	(Portugal) Sporting CP	
23 July 2020	GK	(Germany)	Lisa Weiß	(France) Olympique Lyon	
29 July 2020	DF	(Germany)	Caroline Siems	(Germany) Turbine Potsdam	
29 July 2020	MF	(Germany)	Ramona Petzelberger	(Germany) SGS Essen	
30 July 2020	FW	(Denmark)	Stine Larsen	(France) FC Fleury 91	
5 October 2020	GK	(England)	Charlotte Clarke (Note: Dual registration with Derby County)	(England) Derby County	
21 December 2020	FW	(Japan)	Mana Iwabuchi	(Japan) INAC Kobe Leonessa	

=== Transfers out ===
Date	Position	Nationality	Name	To	Ref.
11 June 2020	DF	(England)	Jade Richards	(England) Blackburn Rovers	
11 June 2020	FW	(England)	Kerri Welsh		
11 June 2020	MF	(England)	Alice Hassall	(England) Coventry United	
11 June 2020	MF	(Republic of Ireland)	Phoebe Warner	(England) Coventry United	
11 June 2020	FW	(England)	Melissa Johnson	(England) Sheffield United	
11 June 2020	DF	(England)	Charlotte Greengrass	(England) Nottingham Forest	
11 June 2020	MF	(Austria)	Sophie Maierhofer	(Germany) MSV Duisburg	
11 June 2020	GK	(Poland)	Daniela Kosinska	(England) Stoke City	
