= 2022–23 Aston Villa W.F.C. season =

Aston Villa
2022–23 season
- Head coach: Carla Ward
- Stadium: Bescot Stadium, Walsall
- WSL: 5th
- FA Cup: Semi-final
- League Cup: Quarter-final
- Top goalscorer: League: Rachel Daly (22); All: Rachel Daly (30)
- Highest home attendance: 7,517 (vs. Liverpool, 21 May)
- Lowest home attendance: 1,365 (vs. Brighton & Hove Albion, 4 February)
- Average home league attendance: 4,204
Home colours	Away colours	Third colours

The 2022–23 Aston Villa W.F.C. season was the club's 27th season under their Aston Villa affiliation, the organisation's 49th overall season in existence and their third season in the Women's Super League, the highest level of the football pyramid. Along with competing in the WSL, the club also contested two domestic cup competitions: the FA Cup and the League Cup.

== Squad ==
As of 31 January 2023

Note: Flags indicate national team as defined under FIFA eligibility rules; some limited exceptions apply. Players may hold more than one non-FIFA nationality.

No.	Pos.	Nation	Player
1	GK	ENG	Hannah Hampton
2	MF	ENG	Sarah Mayling
3	DF	ENG	Meaghan Sargeant
4	MF	ENG	Remi Allen
6	DF	SCO	Rachel Corsie (captain)
7	FW	SUI	Alisha Lehmann
8	FW	ENG	Rachel Daly
9	FW	AUS	Emily Gielnik
10	MF	FRA	Kenza Dali
11	FW	ENG	Chantelle Boye-Hlorkah
12	MF	ENG	Lucy Staniforth
13	GK	ENG	Anna Draper
14	DF	ENG	Danielle Turner
15	DF	ENG	Anna Patten (on loan from Arsenal)
17	FW	WAL	Natasha Harding

No.	Pos.	Nation	Player
18	MF	ENG	Freya Gregory
19	MF	ENG	Laura Blindkilde
20	FW	SCO	Kirsty Hanson (on loan from Manchester United)
21	GK	NZL	Anna Leat
22	FW	NIR	Simone Magill
24	MF	ENG	Alice Keitley
28	DF	ENG	Evie Rabjohn
31	FW	IRL	Ruesha Littlejohn
32	MF	WAL	Mary McAteer
33	DF	ENG	Maz Pacheco
34	DF	ENG	Martha MacPhail
35	MF	ENG	Georgia Mullett
36	MF	ENG	Megan Shaw
37	FW	ENG	Ruby-Rae Tucker
88	MF	ENG	Jordan Nobbs

== Transfers ==
=== Transfers in ===
Date	Position	Nationality	Name	From	Ref.
7 July 2022	FW	(Northern Ireland)	Simone Magill	(England) Everton	
11 July 2022	DF	(England)	Danielle Turner	(England) Everton	
12 July 2022	FW	(Wales)	Natasha Harding	(England) Reading	
13 July 2022	GK	(New Zealand)	Anna Leat	(England) West Ham United	
5 August 2022	MF	(France)	Kenza Dali	(England) Everton	
9 August 2022	FW	(England)	Rachel Daly	(United States) Houston Dash	
5 January 2023	MF	(England)	Jordan Nobbs	(England) Arsenal	
9 January 2023	MF	(England)	Lucy Staniforth	(England) Manchester United	

=== Loans in ===
Date	Position	Nationality	Name	From	Until	Ref.
7 July 2022	DF	(England)	Anna Patten	(England) Arsenal	End of season	
8 September 2022	FW	(Scotland)	Kirsty Hanson	(England) Manchester United	End of season	

=== Transfers out ===
Date	Position	Nationality	Name	To	Ref.
8 May 2022	DF	(England)	Anita Asante	Retired	
19 May 2022	FW	(England)	Jodie Hutton	(England) Bristol City	
19 May 2022	DF	(England)	Natalie Haigh	Retired	
19 May 2022	FW	(Jamaica)	Shania Hayles	(England) Bristol City	
19 May 2022	FW	(England)	Sophie Haywood	(England) Sheffield United	
20 June 2022	MF	(Scotland)	Chloe Arthur	(England) Crystal Palace	
1 July 2022	MF	(Germany)	Ramona Petzelberger	(England) Tottenham Hotspur	
20 January 2023	MF	(England)	Isobel Goodwin	(England) Coventry United	

=== Loans out ===
Date	Position	Nationality	Name	To	Until	Ref.
13 July 2022	GK	(England)	Sian Rogers	(England) Charlton Athletic	End of season	
12 August 2022	DF	(England)	Elisha N'Dow	(England) Charlton Athletic	End of season	
26 August 2022	MF	(England)	Olivia Rabjohn (Note: Dual registration)	(England) Coventry United	End of season	
23 September 2022	MF	(Wales)	Mary McAteer	(England) Coventry United	End of season	
31 January 2023	DF	(England)	Olivia McLoughlin	(England) Birmingham City	End of season	

== Preseason ==
23 July 2022 Friendly	Aston Villa	6–0	Oxford United	Bodymoor Heath
11:30	E. Rabjohn; Boye-Hlorkah; McAteer; Pacheco; Harding; O. Rabjohn	Report		Stadium: Bodymoor Heath; Attendance: Behind-closed-doors

30 July 2022 Friendly	Aston Villa	5–0	Coventry United	Bodymoor Heath
11:30	Boye-Hlorkah; Gielnik	Report		Stadium: Bodymoor Heath; Attendance: Behind-closed-doors

12 August 2022 Friendly	Sevilla (Spain)	6–1	Aston Villa	Marbella
11:00		Report		Stadium: Marbella Football Center

17 August 2022 Friendly	Aston Villa	0–1	Liverpool	Bodymoor Heath
14:00		Report	Kiernan	Stadium: Bodymoor Heath; Attendance: Behind-closed-doors

21 August 2022 Friendly	Aston Villa	1–1	Everton	Bodymoor Heath
14:00	Turner	Report	Graham	Stadium: Bodymoor Heath; Attendance: Behind-closed-doors

28 August 2022 Friendly	Reading	3–2	Aston Villa	Wokingham
14:00	Mitchell; Woodham; Vanhaevermaet (pen.)	Report	Daly (pen.)	Stadium: Hogwood Park

== Women's Super League ==
=== Results summary ===
Overall								Home						Away					
Pld	W	D	L	GF	GA	GD	Pts	W	D	L	GF	GA	GD	W	D	L	GF	GA	GD
22	11	4	7	47	37	+10	37	4	2	5	22	22	0	7	2	2	25	15	+10

Last updated: 27 May 2023.
Source: FA WSL

=== Results by matchday ===
Round	1	2	3	4	5	6	7	8	9	10	11	12	13	14	15	16	17	18	19	20	21	22
Ground	H	A	H	H	A	A	H	A	H	H	A	H	A	A	A	H	H	A	H	A	H	A
Result	W	W	L	L	L	W	W	L	L	W	D	D	W	W	W	W	L	D	L	W	D	W
Position	3	3	4	7	8	6	5	5	6	7	6	6	5	5	5	5	5	5	5	5	5	5

A = Away; H = Home; W = Win; D = Draw; L = Loss

=== Results ===
11 September 2022	Brighton & Hove Albion	v	Aston Villa	Brighton and Hove
14:00				Stadium: Falmer Stadium
Note: The FA postponed all of the weekend's football fixtures following the death of Elizabeth II on 8 September 2022.

18 September 2022 1	Aston Villa	4–3	Manchester City	Aston
12:30	Lehmann 22'; Daly 32', 76'; Dali 58'	Report	Coombs 45+1', 55'; Shaw 53'; Raso (yellow card) 72'	Stadium: Villa Park; Attendance: 6,785; Referee: Louise Saunders

25 September 2022 2	Leicester City	0–2	Aston Villa	Leicester
15:00		Report	Daly 3' (pen.); Lehmann (yellow card) 16'; Gielnik 86'	Stadium: King Power Stadium; Attendance: 2,713; Referee: Thomas Parsons

15 October 2022 3	Aston Villa	1–2	West Ham United	Walsall
12:30	Dali 77'; Mayling (yellow card) 90+1'	Report	Brynjarsdóttir 2'; Hayashi 14'; Arnold (yellow card) 32'; Snerle (yellow card) 75'; Cissoko (red card) 90+1'	Stadium: Bescot Stadium; Attendance: 1,753; Referee: Cheryl Foster

22 October 2022 4	Aston Villa	0–1	Everton	Walsall
12:30	Corsie (yellow card) 40'	Report	Björn (yellow card) 56'; Graham 57'	Stadium: Bescot Stadium; Attendance: 1,636; Referee: Kirsty Dowle

30 October 2022 5	Chelsea	3–1	Aston Villa	Kingston upon Thames
14:00	James 22', 47'; Kerr 63'; Ingle (yellow card) 90'	Report	Daly 38'; Blindkilde (yellow card) 45+1'	Stadium: Kingsmeadow; Attendance: 4,373; Referee: Martin Woods

6 November 2022 6	Liverpool	0–1	Aston Villa	Birkenhead
14:00	Campbell (yellow card) 56'; Koivisto (yellow card) 59'; Fahey (yellow card) 88'	Report	Pacheco (yellow card) 38'; Daly 57' (pen.), (yellow card) 67'; Leat (yellow card) 77'; Hanson (yellow card) 90+5'	Stadium: Prenton Park; Attendance: 1,719; Referee: Robert Massey-Ellis

20 November 2022 7	Aston Villa	3–1	Reading	Aston
14:00	Daly 37', 45+2', 76' (pen.)	Report	Wade 7'; Burns (red card) 65'	Stadium: Villa Park; Attendance: 4,566; Referee: Adam Herczeg

3 December 2022 8	Manchester United	5–0	Aston Villa	Trafford
12:30	Zelem 13'; Galton 28'; Russo 51'; Batlle 76'; Williams 90+3'	Report	Patten (yellow card) 83'	Stadium: Old Trafford; Attendance: 30,196; Referee: Louise Saunders

11 December 2022 9	Aston Villa	1–4	Arsenal	Aston
16:15	Hanson 6'; Turner (yellow card) 38'	Report	Corsie 26' (o.g.); Miedema 30'; McCabe 62'; Nobbs 84'	Stadium: Villa Park; Attendance: 6,013; Referee: Paul Howard

14 January 2023 10	Aston Villa	2–1	Tottenham Hotspur	Walsall
12:30	Dali 34'; Daly 38'; Nobbs (yellow card) 64'; Blindkilde (yellow card) 83'	Report	Turner (yellow card) 15'; England 28'; Ayane (yellow card) 69'; Spence (yellow card) 84'	Stadium: Bescot Stadium; Attendance: 2,049; Referee: Thomas Kirk

21 January 2023 11	Manchester City	1–1	Aston Villa	Manchester
11:30	Castellanos 28'	Report	Hanson 31'	Stadium: Academy Stadium; Attendance: 3,306; Referee: Cheryl Foster

4 February 2023 12	Aston Villa	1–1	Brighton & Hove Albion	Walsall
12:30	Green 33' (o.g.); Mayling (yellow card) 90+2'	Report	Zigiotti Olme 74'; Kullberg (yellow card) 90+1'	Stadium: Bescot Stadium; Attendance: 1,365; Referee: Louise Saunders

12 February 2023 13	Brighton & Hove Albion	2–6	Aston Villa	Crawley
14:00	Zigiotti Olme 3'; Carter 49' (pen.)	Report	Staniforth 15'; Hanson 17'; Nobbs 23', 43', 69'; Daly 36'; Mayling (yellow card) 80'	Stadium: Broadfield Stadium; Attendance: 2,593; Referee: Jane Simms
Note: Rescheduled from 11 September 2022 and moved from Falmer Stadium.

5 March 2023 14	Everton	0–2	Aston Villa	Liverpool
13:00	Graham (yellow card) 90+1'	Report	Dali 5'; Finnigan 67' (o.g.); Lehmann (yellow card) 77'; Hanson (yellow card) 79'	Stadium: Walton Hall Park; Attendance: 805; Referee: Amy Fearn

12 March 2023 15	West Ham United	1–2	Aston Villa	Dagenham
15:00	Hayashi (yellow card) 22'; Asseyi 79'	Report	Daly 34'; Nobbs 62'; Littlejohn (yellow card) 85'	Stadium: Victoria Road; Attendance: 1,204; Referee: James Bell

26 March 2023 16	Aston Villa	5–0	Leicester City	Aston
14:00	Dali 6'; Lehmann 35', 71'; Daly 45', 55'	Report		Stadium: Villa Park; Attendance: 6,489; Referee: Jane Simms

2 April 2023 17	Aston Villa	0–3	Chelsea	Walsall
18:45		Report	Čanković 22'; Reiten 43'; Kerr 56'; Buchanan (yellow card) 90+4'	Stadium: Bescot Stadium; Attendance: 3,835; Referee: Louise Saunders

23 April 2023 18	Tottenham Hotspur	3–3	Aston Villa	Leyton
14:00	Summanen 27', 47'; England 59'	Report	Hanson 9', (yellow card) 75'; Daly 21', 84'	Stadium: Brisbane Road; Attendance: 1,159; Referee: Stacey Pearson

28 April 2023 19	Aston Villa	2–3	Manchester United	Walsall
19:15	Daly 9', 37'; Nobbs (yellow card) 11'; Staniforth (yellow card) 27'; Littlejohn (yellow card) 32'; Pacheco (yellow card) 90+2'	Report	Galton 15'; Parris 62'; Zelem (yellow card) 70'; M. Turner 90+4'	Stadium: Bescot Stadium; Attendance: 4,176; Referee: Lisa Benn

7 May 2023 20	Reading	0–5	Aston Villa	Reading
14:00	Vanhaevermaet (yellow card) 39'; Moore (yellow card) 47'	Report	Daly 14', 55', 63'; Lehmann 41'; Hanson 44'	Stadium: Madejski Stadium; Attendance: 1,250; Referee: Abigail Byrne

21 May 2023 21	Aston Villa	3–3	Liverpool	Aston
14:00	Hanson 7', 70'; Daly 45+1'; Staniforth (yellow card) 85'	Report	Stengel 37', 62'; Dowie 40'	Stadium: Villa Park; Attendance: 7,517; Referee: Kirsty Dowle

27 May 2023 22	Arsenal	0–2	Aston Villa	Borehamwood
14:30	Taylor (yellow card) 32'; McCabe (yellow card) 86'	Report	Daly 45+2'; Lehmann 49'; Magill (yellow card) 70'; Allen (yellow card) 77'; Hampton (yellow card) 85'; Hanson (yellow card) 90+3'	Stadium: Meadow Park; Attendance: 4,018; Referee: Amy Fearn

=== League table ===
Pos	Team	Pld	W	D	L	GF	GA	GD	Pts	Qualification or relegation
3	Arsenal	22	15	2	5	49	16	+33	47	Qualification for the Champions League first round
4	Manchester City	22	15	2	5	50	25	+25	47	
5	Aston Villa	22	11	4	7	47	37	+10	37	
6	Everton	22	9	3	10	29	36	−7	30	
7	Liverpool	22	6	5	11	24	39	−15	23	

Source: Women's Super League
Rules for classification: 1) Points; 2) Goal difference; 3) Number of goals scored.

== Women's FA Cup ==
As a member of the first tier, Aston Villa entered the FA Cup in the fourth round proper.

29 January 2023 Fourth round	Aston Villa	11–0	AFC Fylde	Walsall
18:00	Daly 2', 11', 51', 70'; Blindkilde 7'; Dali 21'; Gielnik 22'; Patten 26'; Lehmann 75'; Pacheco 78'; Mayling 88' (pen.)	Report		Stadium: Bescot Stadium; Attendance: 584; Referee: Callum Parke

26 February 2023 Fifth round	West Ham United	1–1 (a.e.t.) (6–7 p)	Aston Villa	Dagenham
15:00	Brynjarsdóttir 90+2'; Asseyi (yellow card) 90+4'; Smith (yellow card) 95'; Cissoko (yellow card) 105+2'; Longhurst (yellow card) 110'; Filis (yellow card) 114'	Report	Daly 50'; Corsie (yellow card) 74'; Mayling (yellow card) 87'	Stadium: Victoria Road; Attendance: 832; Referee: Lisa Benn
	Penalties
	Brynjarsdóttir (penalty scored); Fisk (penalty missed); Filis (penalty scored); Asseyi (penalty scored); Atkinson (penalty scored); Shimizu (penalty scored); Flannery (penalty scored); Arnold (penalty missed)		(penalty scored) Mayling; (penalty scored) Staniforth; (penalty scored) Gielnik; (penalty missed) Nobbs; (penalty scored) Pacheco; (penalty scored) Gregory; (penalty scored) Corsie; (penalty scored) Hampton

19 March 2023 Quarter-final	Aston Villa	2–1 (a.e.t.)	Manchester City	Walsall
18:00	Corsie 20'; Daly 96'; Dali (yellow card) 101'; Hanson (yellow card) 117'	Report	Castellanos 38'; Greenwood (yellow card) 53'	Stadium: Bescot Stadium; Attendance: 1,702; Referee: Rebecca Welch

16 April 2023 Semi-final	Aston Villa	0–1	Chelsea	Walsall
14:15		Report	Kerr 59'; Mušović (yellow card) 84'	Stadium: Bescot Stadium; Attendance: 5,292; Referee: Cheryl Foster

== FA Women's League Cup ==
=== Group stage ===
1 October 2022 Group stage	Aston Villa	1–1 (4–3 p)	Manchester United	Walsall
12:30	Lehmann (yellow card) 28'; Daly (yellow card) 40', (goal) 72'	Report	Parris 16'	Stadium: Bescot Stadium; Referee: Melissa Burgin
	Penalties
	Lehmann (penalty scored); Corsie (penalty scored); Daly (penalty missed); Dali (penalty missed); Mayling (penalty scored); Harding (penalty missed); Pacheco (penalty scored)		(penalty scored) Zelem; (penalty missed) Ladd; (penalty scored) Bøe Risa; (penalty scored) Le Tissier; (penalty missed) Toone; (penalty missed) Blundell; (penalty missed) Batlle

26 October 2022 Group stage	Everton	1–1 (4–2 p)	Aston Villa	Liverpool
18:30	Beever-Jones 62'; Bennison (yellow card) 79'	Report	Mayling (yellow card) 45+1'; Harding 49'; McLoughlin (yellow card) 54'; Corsie (yellow card) 74'	Stadium: Walton Hall Park
	Penalties
	Graham (penalty scored); Stenevik (penalty scored); Bennison (penalty scored); Galli (penalty missed); Björn (penalty scored)		(penalty scored) Mayling; (penalty missed) Patten; (penalty scored) Harding; (penalty missed) Blindkilde

27 November 2022 Group stage	Aston Villa	1–0	Durham	Walsall
18:00	Daly 75'	Report	Robert (yellow card) 33'; Salicki (yellow card) 36'; Clarke (yellow card) 65'; Hardy (yellow card) 72'; Crosthwaite (yellow card) 83'	Stadium: Bescot Stadium

7 December 2022 Group stage	Sheffield United	1–2	Aston Villa	Scunthorpe
19:30	Brown (yellow card) 61'; Enderby 80' (pen.)	Report	Hanson 20'; Dali 22'	Stadium: Glanford Park

Pos	Team	Pld	W	WPEN	LPEN	L	GF	GA	GD	Pts	Qualification	AST	MUN	DUR	EVE	SHU
1	Aston Villa	4	2	1	1	0	5	3	+2	9	Advanced to knock-out stage	—	1–1	1–0	–	–
2	Manchester United	4	2	0	2	0	11	5	+6	8	Possible knock-out stage based on ranking	–	—	–	4–2	4–0
3	Durham	4	1	2	0	1	6	6	0	7		–	2–2	—	–	3–3
4	Everton	4	1	1	0	2	6	6	0	5		1–1	–	0–1	—	–
5	Sheffield United	4	0	0	1	3	4	12	−8	1		1–2	–	–	3–0	—

Rules for classification: 1) Points; 2) Goal difference; 3) Number of goals scored; 4) Number of wins; 5) Head-to-head record

=== Knockout stage ===
26 January 2023 Quarter-final	Arsenal	3–0	Aston Villa	Borehamwood
19:45	Maanum 29', 50'; McCabe (yellow card) 40'; Foord 60'	Report		Stadium: Meadow Park; Attendance: 2,959; Referee: Carl Brook

== Squad statistics ==
=== Appearances ===
As of 27 May 2023

Starting appearances are listed first, followed by substitute appearances after the + symbol where applicable.

No.	Pos	Nat	Player	Total		WSL		FA Cup		League Cup	
No.	Pos	Nat	Player	Apps	Goals	Apps	Goals	Apps	Goals	Apps	Goals
1	GK	(England) ENG	Hannah Hampton	21	0	15	0	4	0	2	0
2	MF	(England) ENG	Sarah Mayling	29	1	20	0	3+1	1	5	0
3	DF	(England) ENG	Meaghan Sargeant	0	0	0	0	0	0	0	0
4	MF	(England) ENG	Remi Allen	3	0	1+2	0	0	0	0	0
6	DF	(Scotland) SCO	Rachel Corsie	22	1	12+3	0	3	1	3+1	0
7	FW	(Switzerland) SUI	Alisha Lehmann	31	6	18+4	5	3+1	1	2+3	0
8	FW	(England) ENG	Rachel Daly	30	30	22	22	4	6	4	2
9	FW	(Australia) AUS	Emily Gielnik	14	2	0+9	1	1+1	1	2+1	0
10	MF	(France) FRA	Kenza Dali	30	7	21	5	4	1	5	1
11	FW	(England) ENG	Chantelle Boye-Hlorkah	6	0	0+4	0	0	0	2	0
12	MF	(England) ENG	Lucy Staniforth	17	1	13	1	4	0	0	0
13	GK	(England) ENG	Anna Draper	0	0	0	0	0	0	0	0
14	DF	(England) ENG	Danielle Turner	30	0	22	0	4	0	4	0
15	DF	(England) ENG	Anna Patten	25	1	18+1	0	3	1	3	0
17	FW	(Wales) WAL	Natasha Harding	6	1	0+4	0	0	0	1+1	1
18	MF	(England) ENG	Freya Gregory	12	0	1+6	0	0+2	0	2+1	0
19	MF	(England) ENG	Laura Blindkilde	29	1	16+5	0	2+1	1	2+3	0
20	FW	(Scotland) SCO	Kirsty Hanson	28	8	20	7	3+1	0	4	1
21	GK	(New Zealand) NZL	Anna Leat	10	0	7	0	0	0	3	0
22	FW	(Northern Ireland) NIR	Simone Magill	3	0	0+3	0	0	0	0	0
24	MF	(England) ENG	Alice Keitley	1	0	0+1	0	0	0	0	0
28	DF	(England) ENG	Evie Rabjohn	5	0	1+2	0	0+1	0	0+1	0
31	FW	(Republic of Ireland) IRL	Ruesha Littlejohn	10	0	1+7	0	0	0	1+1	0
32	MF	(Wales) WAL	Mary McAteer	0	0	0	0	0	0	0	0
33	DF	(England) ENG	Maz Pacheco	31	1	22	0	2+2	1	5	0
34	DF	(England) ENG	Martha MacPhail	0	0	0	0	0	0	0	0
35	MF	(England) ENG	Georgia Mullett	3	0	0+2	0	0+1	0	0	0
36	MF	(England) ENG	Megan Shaw	1	0	0	0	0+1	0	0	0
37	FW	(England) ENG	Ruby-Rae Tucker	0	0	0	0	0	0	0	0
88	MF	(England) ENG	Jordan Nobbs	15	4	11	4	3	0	1	0
Players away from the club on loan:
16	DF	(England) ENG	Olivia McLoughlin	13	0	1+6	0	1	0	4+1	0
Players who appeared for the club but left during the season:
26	FW	(England) ENG	Isobel Goodwin	4	0	0+3	0	0	0	0+1	0

== Club awards ==
=== Player of the Month award ===
Voted for by fans on Aston Villa's official website.

Month	Player
August	Not awarded
September	Not awarded
October	Not awarded
November	(England) Rachel Daly
December	Not awarded
January	(England) Rachel Daly
February	(England) Jordan Nobbs
March	(England) Rachel Daly
April	
