= Laura Blindkilde Brown =

English footballer (born 2003)

Laura Blindkilde
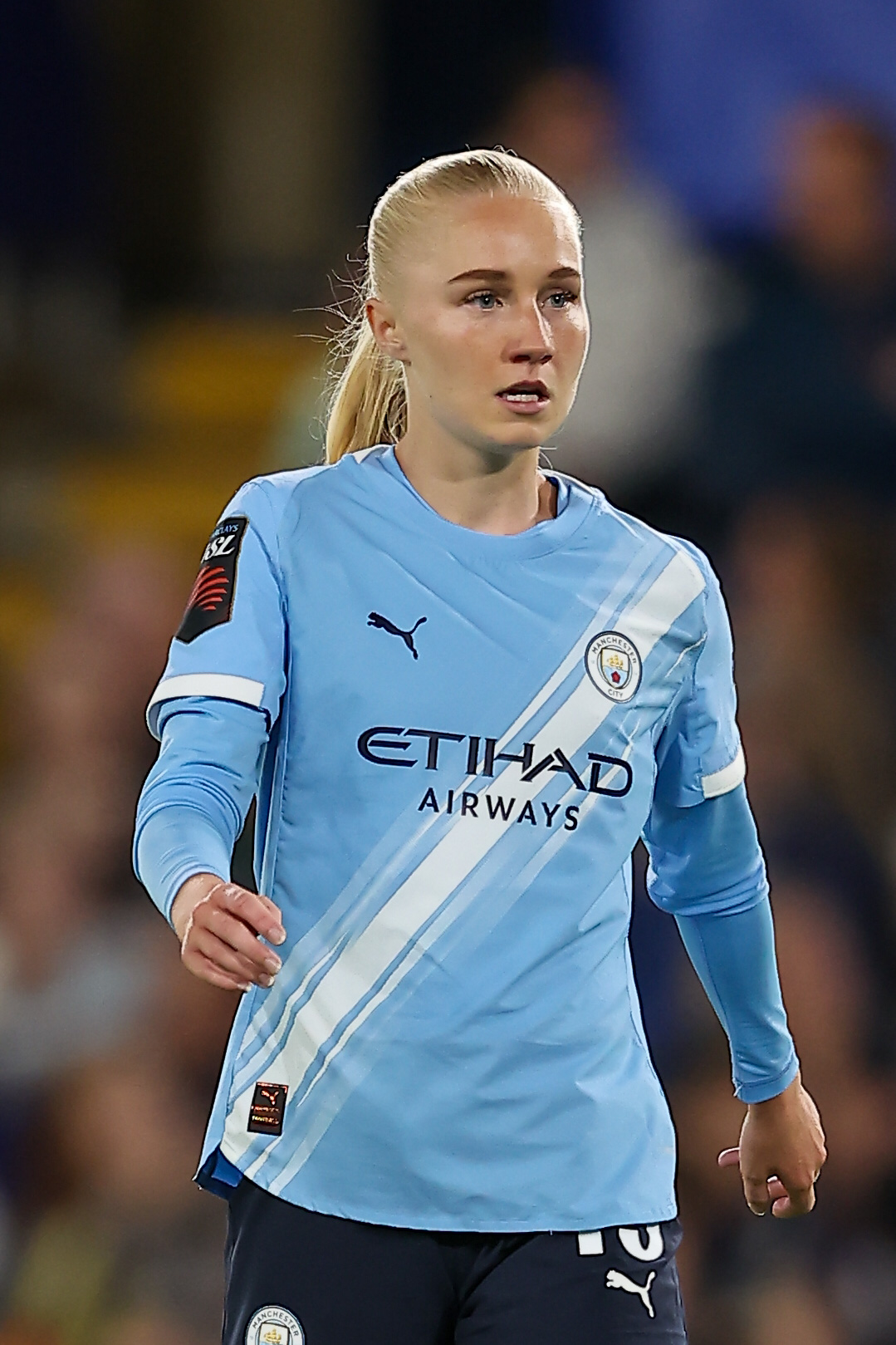
- Blindkilde in 2025

Personal information
- Full name: Laura Madison Blindkilde Brown
- Date of birth: 9 September 2003 (age 23)
- Place of birth: Worcester, Worcestershire, England
- Height: 1.62 m (5 ft 4 in)
- Position: Midfielder

Team information
- Current team: Manchester City
- Number: 19

Youth career
- Warndon Villages
- Aston Villa
- Birmingham City

Senior career*
Years	Team	Apps	(Gls)
2019–2020	Birmingham City	1	(0)
2020–2024	Aston Villa	41	(0)
2024–	Manchester City	48	(2)

International career^{‡}
2019	England U17	4	(0)
2021–2022	England U19	11	(0)
2022–	England U23	16	(2)
2024–	England	8	(0)
- * Club domestic league appearances and goals as of 22:15, 22 November 2026 (UTC) ‡ National team caps and goals as of 00:15, 10 October 2026 (UTC)

Laura Madison Blindkilde Brown (Danish: [ˈple̝nˀˌkʰile]; born 9 September 2003) is an English professional footballer who plays as a midfielder for Women's Super League club Manchester City and the England national team. She previously played for Birmingham City, Aston Villa, and has represented England at youth level.

== Early life ==
Blindkilde played football with Warndon Villages Boys until aged 9. She then joined the Aston Villa academy having trailed for the under-11s, prior to joining Birmingham City five years later. She attended Tudor Grange Academy in Worcester followed by Worcester Sixth Form College.

== Club career ==
=== Birmingham City ===
Blindkilde played for the under-21 academy team at Birmingham City before making her senior debut for the club on 11 December 2019 as a stoppage time substitute against Manchester United in a 3–1 League Cup group stage defeat. She made her FA Women's Super League debut the following month, on 5 January 2020 in a 2–0 defeat to Arsenal.

=== Aston Villa ===
In June 2020, Blindkilde moved to Aston Villa, initially playing with the club's academy team. On 9 September 2021, she signed her first professional contract for Aston Villa. She chose to switch from playing under her surname "Brown" to displaying her Danish middle name "Blindkilde" on the back of her shirt for the 2021–22 season. Blindkilde was named Aston Villa Women's Young Player of the Season for the 2021–22 and 2022–23 seasons, having played in all but one WSL fixture in the latter. She finished her career with Villa having made over 50 appearances for the club.

=== Manchester City ===
On 31 January 2024, Blindkilde signed for WSL club Manchester City on a three-and-a-half-year deal for a reported £200,000. On 21 April 2024, she scored her debut goal for City against West Ham United in a 5–0 victory, helping the team reach the top of the table after a 13th consecutive league win.

Brown began the 2025–26 season in good form with 6 consecutive starts for City. She won the supporter's Player of the Month award for September 2025, and was awarded Player of the Match the following month in a 2–1 win over Liverpool, playing a key role in City's dominant performance. A week later, in a League Cup group stage match against Newcastle United, Blindkilde scored the winning penalty during the sudden-death shoot-out.

== International career ==
=== Youth ===
Blindkilde has represented England at under-17, under-19, and under-23 level. She is eligible to represent Denmark through her Danish mother, but has stated that she only wishes to play for England.

Blindkilde was first called up to the England under-23 team on 25 August 2022 for a fixture against Norway. She made her debut later in that match on 2 September, coming on as a 83rd minute substitute in a 2–1 win over Norway under-23s. On 6 April 2023, Blindkilde scored her first youth international goal with the under-23s against Portugal in a 3–2 victory. On 24 October 2024, 18 months later, she scored her second goal for the under-23s in a 1–1 draw with the Netherlands.

=== Senior ===
Blindkilde received her first senior call-up on 19 November 2024 for the friendly fixtures against the United States and Switzerland. On 3 December, she made her debut against Switzerland as part of the starting eleven in a 1–0 result. Blindkilde has been awarded the Legacy number 233 by The Football Association. In June 2025, she was named as a standby player for UEFA Euro 2025, before returning to the senior squad for friendly fixtures in October.

== Style of play ==
After joining Manchester City in January 2024, Blindkilde played in a number 10 role, in advanced positions or on the wing, before moving into a more defensive central midfield position by October 2025, nearer to the defensive line. England under-23 manager Emma Coates described her diverse skillset as emphasised by her "quality on the ball" rather than tactical positioning and is considered as a defensive midfielder, akin to Keira Walsh, for the England senior team.

== Personal life ==
Blindkilde was diagnosed with supraventricular tachycardia and received keyhole surgery on her heart.

== Career statistics ==
=== Club ===
As of match played 22 November 2026.

Appearances and goals by club, season and competition
Club	Season	League			FA Cup		WSL Players Cup		Europe		Total	
Club	Season	Division	Apps	Goals	Apps	Goals	Apps	Goals	Apps	Goals	Apps	Goals
Birmingham City	2019–20	Women's Super League	1	0	0	0	1	0	—		2	0
Aston Villa	2020–21	Women's Super League	0	0	0	0	0	0	—		0	0
Aston Villa	2021–22	Women's Super League	11	0	1	0	3	1	—		15	1
Aston Villa	2022–23	Women's Super League	21	0	3	1	5	0	—		29	1
Aston Villa	2023–24	Women's Super League	9	0	1	0	4	0	—		14	0
Aston Villa	Total		41	0	5	1	12	1	—		58	2
Manchester City	2023–24	Women's Super League	6	1	—		—		—		6	1
Manchester City	2024–25	Women's Super League	11	0	3	0	1	0	8 (Note: Appearances in UEFA Women's Champions League)	1	23	1
Manchester City	2025–26	Women's Super League	20	1	4	0	5	0	—		29	1
Manchester City	2026–27	Women's Super League	11	0	0	0	—		5	0	16	0
Manchester City	Total		48	2	7	0	6	0	13	1	74	3
Career total			90	2	12	1	19	1	13	1	134	5

=== International ===
As of match played 9 October 2026

Appearances and goals by national team and year
National team	Year	Apps	Goals
England	2024	1	0
England	2025	1	0
England	2026	6	0
Total		8	0

== Honours ==
Manchester City

- Women's Super League: 2025–26
- Women's FA Cup: 2025–26

Individual

- Aston Villa Women's Young Player of the Season: 2021–22, 2022–23
