= Evie Rabjohn =

English footballer (born 2005)

Personal information
- Full name: Evie Lauren Isabel Rabjohn
- Date of birth: 28 April 2005 (age 21)
- Place of birth: England
- Positions: Defender; midfielder

Team information
- Current team: Celtic FC
- Number: 10

Youth career
- –2020: Birmingham City
- 2020–2021: Aston Villa

Senior career*
| Years | Team | Apps | (Gls) |
| 2021–2023 | Aston Villa | 3 | (0) |
| 2023–2026 | Manchester United | 0 | (0) |
| 2025–2026 | → Sunderland (loan) | 3 | (0) |
| 2026– | Celtic FC | 10 | (0) |

International career^{‡}
| 2022 | England U17 | 6 | (1) |
| 2022–2024 | England U19 | 11 | (0) |
- * Club domestic league appearances and goals as of 17:27, 6 January 2026 (UTC) ‡ National team caps and goals as of 23:23, 17 July 2024 (UTC)

Evie Lauren Isabel Rabjohn (born 28 April 2005) is an English footballer who plays as a midfielder for Scottish Women's Premier League side Celtic FC.

== Youth career ==
Rabjohn progressed through the Birmingham City academy up to under-16 level. Ahead of the 2020–21 season, she moved to Second City derby rivals Aston Villa as a student athlete, undertaking a BTEC course at Sutton Coldfield College at the same time. She was named Sportswoman of the Year at the college's student athlete awards in 2022.

== Club career ==
=== Aston Villa (2021–2023) ===
On 17 November 2021, Rabjohn made her senior first-team debut for Aston Villa starting and playing the entire 90 minutes of a 2–1 away defeat to Sheffield United in the FA Women's League Cup group stage. She was an unused substitute for the team's final three WSL games of the 2021–22 season.

On 25 September 2022, Rabjohn made her league debut as a stoppage-time substitute, replacing Rachel Daly in a 2–0 Women's Super League victory over Leicester City at King Power Stadium.

=== Manchester United (2023–2026) ===
On 3 May 2023, Rabjohn signed a pre-contract agreement with Manchester United, formally joining the club at the end of the season although she began training with the team immediately.

On 19 July 2024, it was announced that Rabjohn would begin rehabilitation with United having ruptured her anterior cruciate ligament (ACL) on international duty.

On 4 September 2025, Sunderland announced that Rabjohn would join them on season-long loan for the 2025–26 season. On 6 January 2026, she returned to Manchester United having played in six matches for Sunderland.

=== Celtic FC (2026–present) ===
On 6 February 2026, SWPL 1 side Celtic FC announced that Rabjohn had signed a two-and-a-half year deal with the club.

== International career ==
On 24 March 2022, Rabjohn made her England under-17 debut in a 2–1 defeat to France during the second round of 2022 UEFA Women's Under-17 Championship qualification. Six days later she scored her first youth international goal on 30 March, in an 8–0 victory over Croatia as England failed to qualify, finishing second in the group behind France.

In September 2022, Rabjohn was selected for England under-19s for the 2023 U19 Championship qualification campaign, making her debut on 5 October in a 5–0 victory over Slovenia. She appeared in five of the six matches as England progressed from the first round before finishing behind Spain in the second round group stage.

On 17 July 2024, during the 2024 U19 Championship match against Serbia, Rabjohn was stretchered off the pitch after suffering an ACL injury.

== Personal life ==
Rabjohn's older sister, Olivia, is also a professional footballer. They made their professional debuts in the same match in November 2021.

== Career statistics ==
As of 9 November 2023

| Club | Season | League | | | FA Cup | | League Cup | | Continental | | Total | |
| Club | Season | Division | Apps | Goals | Apps | Goals | Apps | Goals | Apps | Goals | Apps | Goals |
|---|---|---|---|---|---|---|---|---|---|---|---|---|
| Aston Villa | 2021–22 | Women's Super League | 0 | 0 | 0 | 0 | 1 | 0 | — | | 1 | 0 |
| Aston Villa | 2022–23 | Women's Super League | 3 | 0 | 1 | 0 | 1 | 0 | — | | 5 | 0 |
| Aston Villa | Total | | 3 | 0 | 1 | 0 | 2 | 0 | 0 | 0 | 6 | 0 |
| Manchester United | 2023–24 | Women's Super League | 0 | 0 | 0 | 0 | 1 | 0 | 0 | 0 | 1 | 0 |
| Career total | | | 3 | 0 | 1 | 0 | 3 | 0 | 0 | 0 | 7 | 0 |
