= Ramona Petzelberger =

German footballer

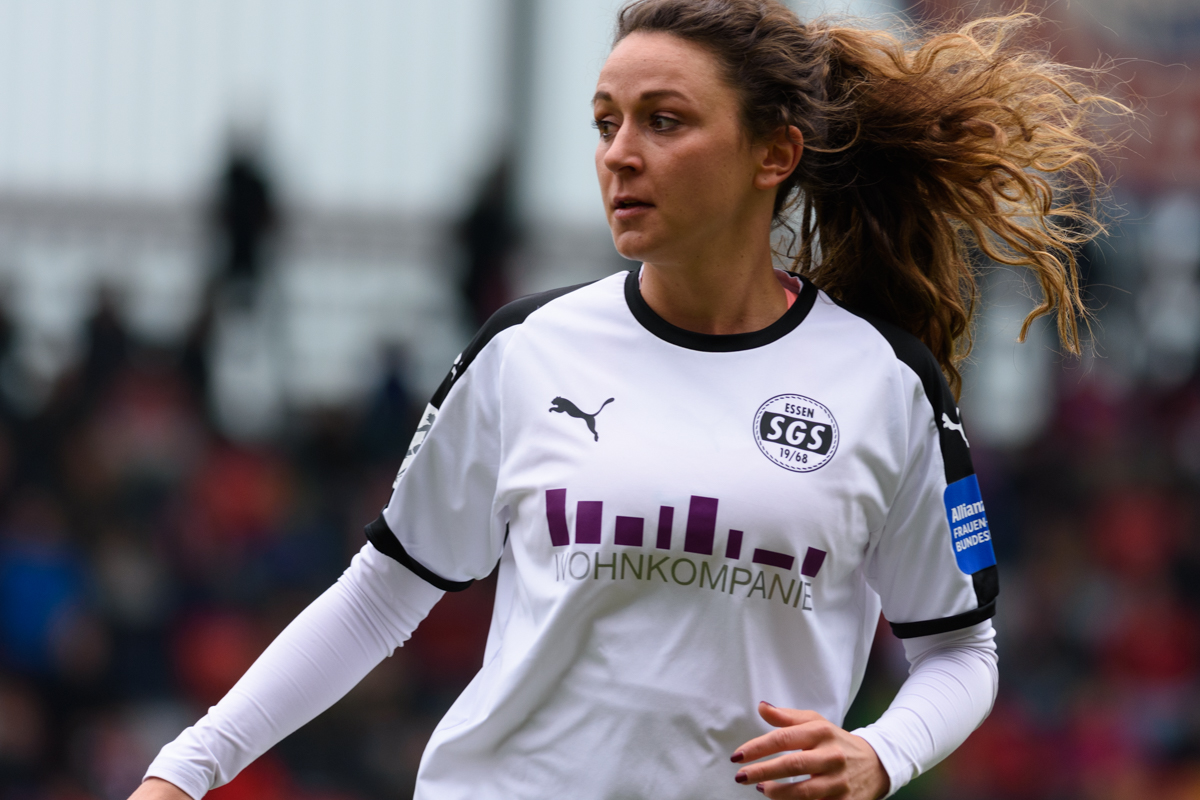
- Petzelberger playing for SGS Essen, 2019

Personal information
- Full name: Ramona Petzelberger
- Date of birth: 13 November 1992 (age 33)
- Place of birth: Essen, Germany
- Height: 1.63 m (5 ft 4 in)
- Position: Midfielder

Team information
- Current team: Como
- Number: 27

Senior career*
Years	Team	Apps	(Gls)
2008–2009	Wattenscheid 09	15	(4)
2009–2012	SC 07 Bad Neuenahr	61	(6)
2012–2017	Bayer 04 Leverkusen	84	(7)
2017–2020	SGS Essen	24	(7)
2020–2022	Aston Villa	30	(6)
2022–2024	Tottenham Hotspur	12	(0)
2024–	FC Como	2	(0)

International career^{‡}
2007–2008	Germany U16	8	(2)
2008–2009	Germany U17	6	(4)
2009–2011	Germany U19	21	(5)
2010–2012	Germany U20	13	(1)
- * Club domestic league appearances and goals as of 19:25, 16 December 2023 (UTC) ‡ National team caps and goals as of 19:32, 23 November 2023 (UTC)

Ramona Petzelberger (born 13 November 1992) is a German professional footballer who plays as a midfielder for FC Como. She previously played for Bundesliga club SGS Essen, and Women's Super League teams Aston Villa and Tottenham Hotspur. In 2022 she was called up to the Germany national team.

== Club career ==
Petzelberger began her career at the Police Sports-Club (Polizei-Sportverein) Essen and later moved to FCR 2001 Duisburg. In 2008 she moved to the second division club SG Wattenscheid 09, for whom she scored four goals in 15 league games. Together with three team players, Petzelberger moved to SC 07 Bad Neuenahr for the 2009/10 season, where she won a regular place straight away. In the Bundesliga she made her debut on 20 September 2009 against Tennis Borussia Berlin; the first goal followed on 10 October 2009 against SC Freiburg.

Petzelberger signed for Bayer 04 Leverkusen for the 2012/13 season. On 19 April 2017, the native Essenerin announced her return to the Ruhr area to the SGS Essen. There, she extended her contract to June 2020. The first and third year were overshadowed for Petzelberger from long injury time. Nevertheless, Ramona Petzelberger played a key role in reaching the DFB Cup final in the final phase of the 2019/20 season (assist in the quarter-final against Turbine Potsdam and leading goal in the semi-final against Bayer 04 Leverkusen). In July 2020 she left SGS Essen.

Petzelberger signed for Aston Villa in July 2020. In 2022 she joined Tottenham Hotspur.

== International career ==
Petzelberger won the 2009 UEFA European Under-17 Championship with the U-17 national team. With the U-19 national team, she reached the semi-finals at the 2010 U-19 European Championship. Petzelberger was also nominated for the 2010 FIFA U-20 World Cup that took place in the same year but had to cancel because of an injury.

From 30 May to 11 June 2011 she took with the team at the U-19 Championship in Italy in part and led the team as captain until the finale, the 8–1 was won against the selection of Norway, while the 4–0 met. After the tournament, Petzelberger was voted "Golden Player" of the finals by UEFA.

Petzelberger captained the squad at the 2012 U-20 World Cup in Japan, finishing in sixth place at the tournament. All three group games was the U-20 team for opt (against China 4–0, Ghana 1–0, and USA 3–0) and drew with nine points and a goal difference of 8–0 goals in the quarter-finals. This was won by the team with Petzelberger against the selection from Norway 4–0. In the semi-finals, the team met host nation Japan; the German team won 3–0 and moved into the final against the United States, which was lost 1–0. Ramona Petzelberger played all encounters over 90 minutes. On the 14th of February 2022 she was called up to Germany national team for the Arnold Clark cup 2022.

== Career statistics ==
=== Club ===
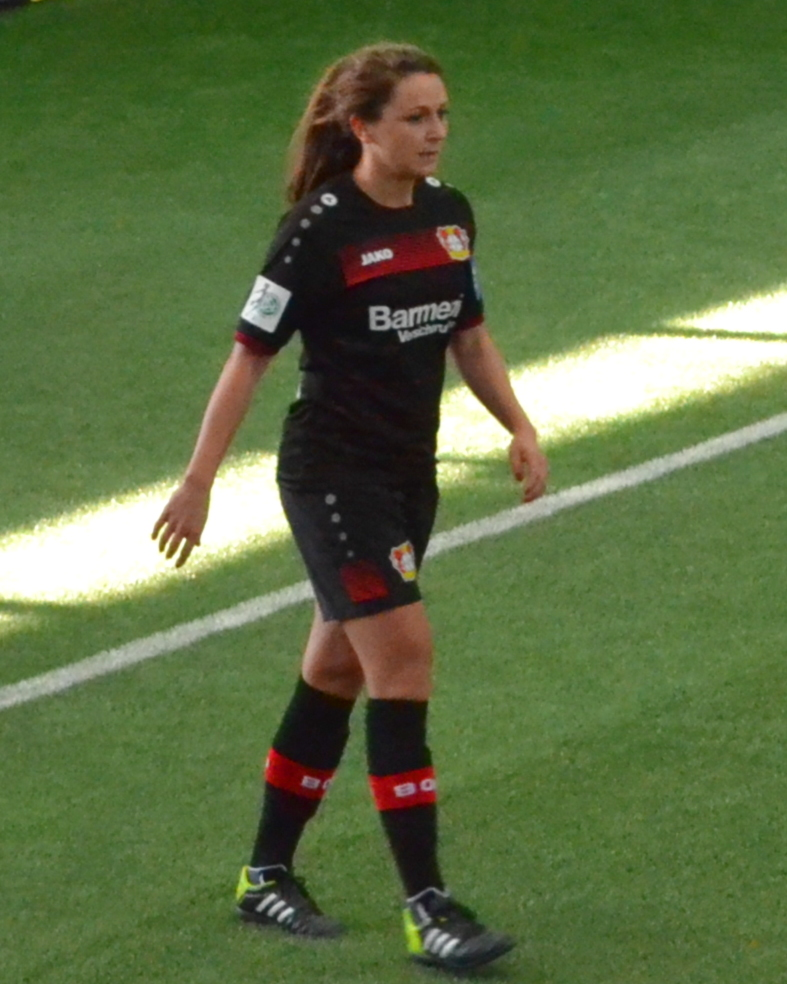
Ramona Petzelberger playing for Bayer Leverkusen in 2017

As of match played 16 December 2023

Appearances and goals by club, season and competition
Club	Season	League			National cup (Note: includes DFB-Pokal, and FA Cup)		League Cup (Note: includes FA Women's League Cup)		Total	
Club	Season	Division	Apps	Goals	Apps	Goals	Apps	Goals	Apps	Goals
SG Wattenscheid 09	2008–09	2. Frauen-Bundesliga	15	4	0	0	—		15	4
SC 07 Bad Neuenahr	2009–10	Frauen-Bundesliga	22	3	1	0	—		23	3
SC 07 Bad Neuenahr	2010–11	Frauen-Bundesliga	20	2	4	1	—		24	3
SC 07 Bad Neuenahr	2011–12	Frauen-Bundesliga	19	1	3	0	—		22	1
SC 07 Bad Neuenahr	Total		61	6	8	1	—		69	7
Bayer Leverkusen	2012–13	Frauen-Bundesliga	21	3	1	0	—		22	3
Bayer Leverkusen	2013–14	Frauen-Bundesliga	22	3	1	0	—		23	3
Bayer Leverkusen	2014–15	Frauen-Bundesliga	22	1	2	0	—		24	1
Bayer Leverkusen	2015–16	Frauen-Bundesliga	6	0	1	1	—		7	1
Bayer Leverkusen	2016–17	Frauen-Bundesliga	13	0	3	1	—		16	1
Bayer Leverkusen	Total		84	7	8	2	—		92	9
SGS Essen	2017–18	Frauen-Bundesliga	2	0	0	0	—		2	0
SGS Essen	2018–19	Frauen-Bundesliga	12	5	0	0	—		12	5
SGS Essen	2019–20	Frauen-Bundesliga	10	2	4	1	—		14	3
SGS Essen	Total		24	7	4	1	—		28	8
Aston Villa	2020–21	Women's Super League	11	3	0	0	2	0	13	3
Aston Villa	2021–22	Women's Super League	19	3	1	1	3	1	23	5
Aston Villa	Total		30	6	1	1	5	1	36	8
Tottenham Hotspur	2022–23	Women's Super League	2	0	0	0	0	0	2	0
Tottenham Hotspur	2023–24	Women's Super League	2	0	0	0	3	0	5	0
Tottenham Hotspur	Total		4	0	0	0	3	0	7	0
Career total			218	30	21	5	8	1	247	36

== Honours ==
- 2007: German B youth champion
- 2009: U-17 European champion
- 2011: U-19 European champion
- 2012: U-20 vice world champion
- Golden player of the 2011 European Under-19 Championship
- Fritz Walter Medal 2010 in silver
