= Bianca Baptiste =

English footballer

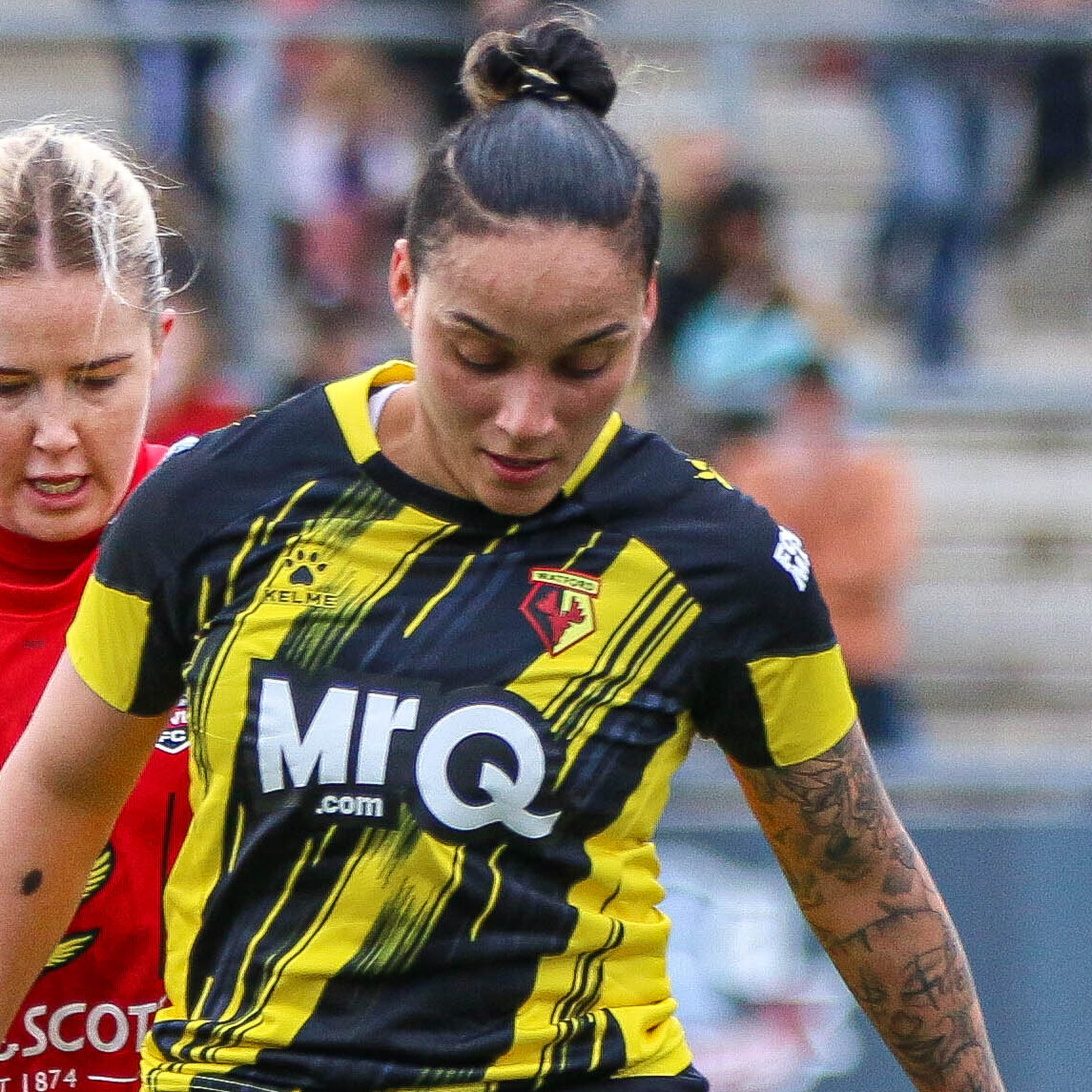
- Playing for Watford in 2024

Personal information
- Full name: Bianca Baptiste
- Date of birth: 15 January 1992 (age 34)
- Height: 1.62 m (5 ft 4 in)
- Position: Forward

Youth career
- Arsenal
- Enfield Town

Senior career*
Years	Team	Apps	(Gls)
2008–2009	Enfield Town		
- Leyton Orient
- Q.P.R.
2010–2019	Tottenham Hotspur	130	(59)
2019–2022	Crystal Palace	50	(12)
2022–2024	Watford	20	(1)
- * Club domestic league appearances and goals

Bianca Baptiste (born 15 January 1992) is an English former professional footballer who played as a forward for Enfield Town, Leyton Orient, Q.P.R., Tottenham Hotspur, Crystal Palace, and Watford FC. She was the top scorer for Tottenham Hotspur in 2017.

== Club career ==
Baptiste was born in England in 1992. Her family have links to Saint Vincent and the Grenadines. She played in the youth system of Arsenal and moved up from the Enfield Town under-16s into their first team for the 2008–09 season.

She is an attacker. She played for ten years with Tottenham Hotspur as a semi-professional until the team decided to go fully professional. The team had done well and in 2017 Baptiste was their top goal scorer when they won the 2016–17 FA Women's Premier League Southern Division title. She also scored two goals in the 3–0 Championship play-off win over Northern Champions Blackburn Rovers, which secured promotion to FA WSL 2.

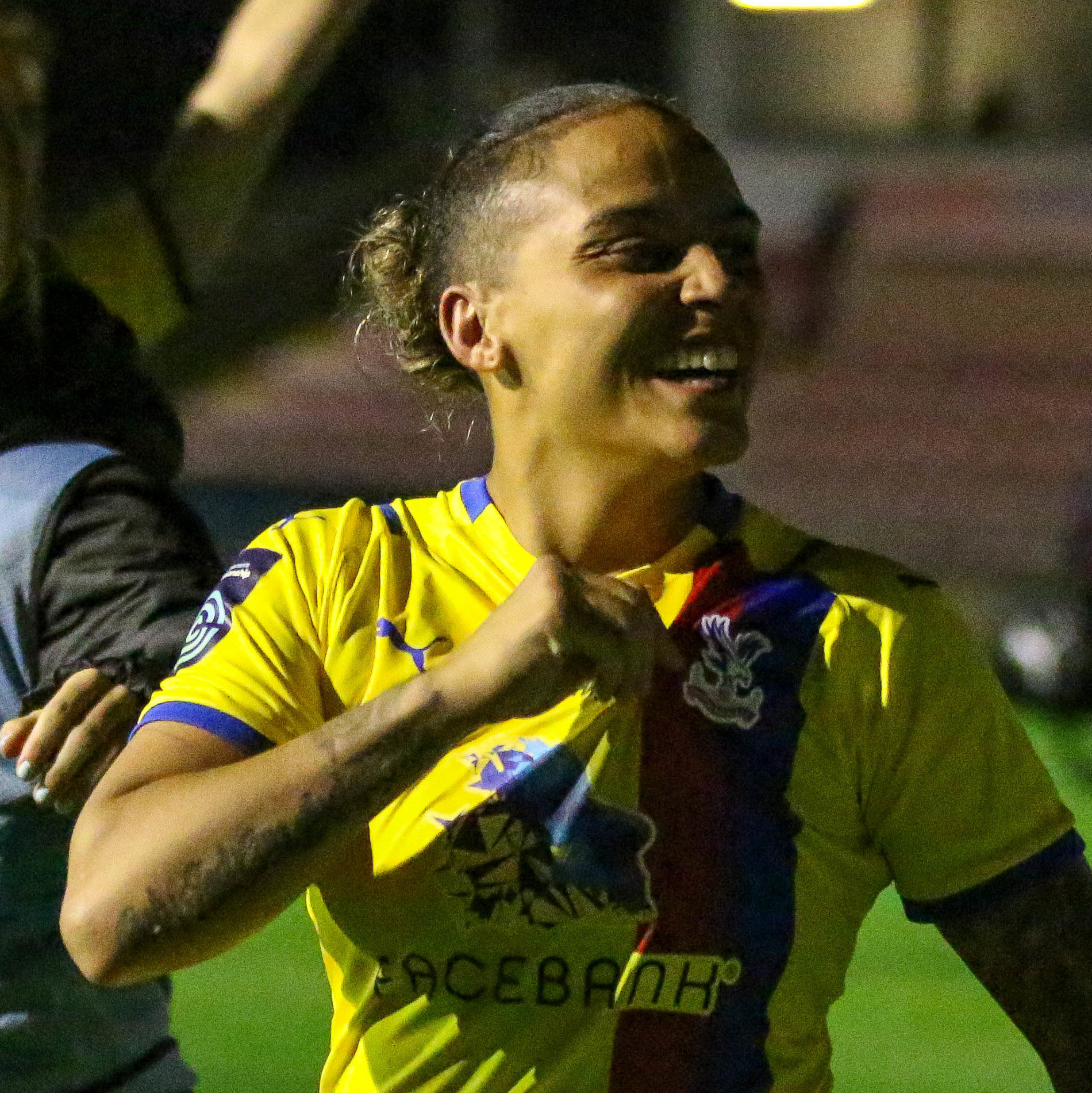
Baptiste at Crystal Palace in 2021

Tottenham were promoted again when they finished second behind Manchester United in the 2018–19 FA Women's Championship. The management team decided to not include Baptiste in the players they made professional for entry to the top division. Seven new players were announced for the team in July 2019. Only about half the team was retained and eleven players had to find a new role, including Sarah Wiltshire and Emma Beckett, who was a recent signing. Baptiste felt rejected and considered leaving the game, she was labelled "Spurs Ladies Nutrition Coach and Personal Trainer" and that appeared to be her new role in the team. She did get some support and she was able to find a new home at another London team – Crystal Palace.

During the 2020–21 season she appeared 25 times for Crystal Palace, scoring 14 goals for the club. In a match against Bristol City she scored two goals, but Bristol replied with four and went on to win the championship.

In January 2022 she was brought on as a substitute for Leigh Nicol during a match with Lewes when her team were losing. She was credited with reviving her team's game leading to a 3–1 victory over Lewes. The manager noted her goal and her contribution after a pass from Molly Sharpe. In the following month, they played London Bees and Baptiste either scored or assisted all of her team's five goals.

Baptiste moved early in July 2022 to Watford to join them for their 2022–2023 season. In May 2024, Baptiste announced her retirement.
