= Diana Silva (footballer) =

Portuguese footballer (born 1995)

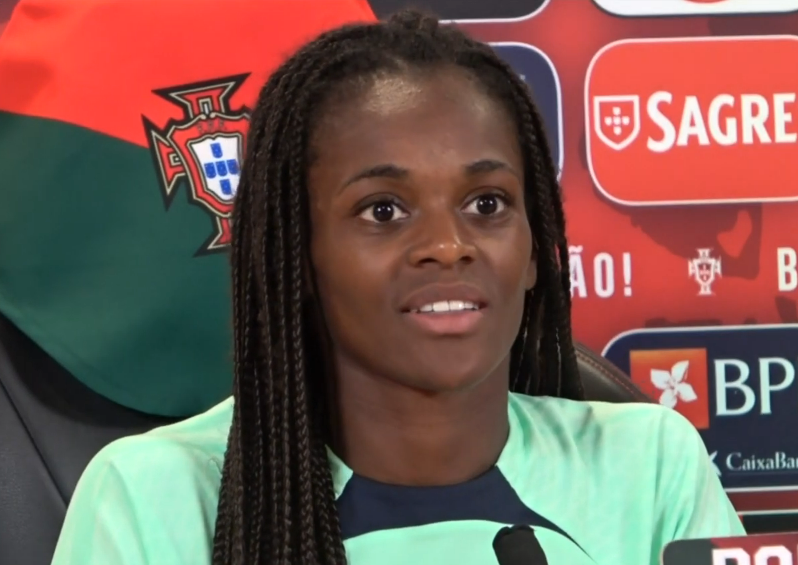
- Silva in 2023

Personal information
- Full name: Diana Micaela Abreu de Sousa e Silva
- Date of birth: 4 June 1995 (age 31)
- Place of birth: Amadora, Portugal
- Height: 1.61 m (5 ft 3 in)
- Position: Forward

Team information
- Current team: Benfica
- Number: 17

Senior career*
| Years | Team | Apps | (Gls) |
| 2009–2015 | Atlético Ouriense | 124 | (89) |
| 2015–2016 | Clube de Albergaria | 24 | (14) |
| 2016–2020 | Sporting CP | 78 | (62) |
| 2020–2021 | Aston Villa | 13 | (1) |
| 2021–2025 | Sporting CP | 75 | (44) |
| 2025– | Benfica | 3 | (2) |

International career^{‡}
| 2011–2013 | Portugal U19 | 28 | (10) |
| 2014– | Portugal | 116 | (26) |
- * Club domestic league appearances and goals as of 28 September 2025 ‡ National team caps and goals as of 16 June 2025

Diana Micaela Abreu de Sousa e Silva (born 4 June 1995) is a Portuguese professional footballer who plays as a forward for Benfica and the Portugal national team.

== Club career ==
Silva started playing football at six years old. When she was 13, she started playing for Atlético Ouriense's boys' team before being promoted straight into their women's team as Atlético Ouriense had no girls' youth team. She later moved to Clube de Albergaria. In 2016, she moved to the newly recreated Sporting CP women's football team. Silva was among the first names revealed to have joined Sporting's new women's team after the club had been 21 years without one. During this year she also started studying for the conclusion of an integrated master's degree in pharmaceutical sciences at the University of Lisbon after transferring from the University of Coimbra where she had been studying for three years since she was 18. She won the Campeonato Nacional de Futebol Feminino with Sporting in her first season with the club.

On 4 July 2025, Silva was announced at Benfica on a three year contract.

== International career ==
Silva played for the Portugal women's national under-19 football team during the UEFA Women's Under-19 Championship. She made her debut for the full Portugal women's national football team in March 2014. In 2017, she was selected as a part of Portugal's debut squad in the UEFA Women's Euro 2017. During the tournament, she received praise for her performance against the Scotland women's national football team. She also played in Portugal's final group match against the England women's national football team however Portugal lost 2–1 and were eliminated. On 30 May 2023, she was included in the 23-player squad for the FIFA Women's World Cup 2023.

On 24 June 2025, Silva was called up to the Portugal squad for the UEFA Women's Euro 2025.

== Career statistics ==
=== Club ===
As of match played 23 May 2026.

Appearances and goals by club, season and competition
| Club | Season | League | | | National cup (Note: Includes Taça de Portugal Feminina, FA Cup) | | League cup (Note: Includes Taça da Liga, League Cup) | | Continental (Note: Includes UEFA Champions League) | | Other (Note: Includes Supertaça de Portugal) | | Total | |
| Club | Season | Division | Apps | Goals | Apps | Goals | Apps | Goals | Apps | Goals | Apps | Goals | Apps | Goals |
|---|---|---|---|---|---|---|---|---|---|---|---|---|---|---|
| Clube de Albergaria | 2015–16 | Nacional | 24 | 14 | 0 | 0 | — | | — | | 1 | 0 | 25 | 14 |
| Sporting CP | 2016–17 | Nacional | 24 | 26 | 5 | 5 | — | | — | | — | | 29 | 31 |
| Sporting CP | 2017–18 | Nacional | 21 | 22 | 6 | 11 | — | | 3 | 2 | 1 | 0 | 31 | 35 |
| Sporting CP | 2018–19 | Nacional | 18 | 7 | 2 | 4 | — | | 3 | 3 | 1 | 0 | 24 | 14 |
| Sporting CP | 2019–20 | Nacional | 15 | 7 | 2 | 0 | 3 | 3 | — | | — | | 20 | 10 |
| Sporting CP | Total | | 78 | 62 | 15 | 20 | 3 | 3 | 6 | 5 | 3 | 0 | 129 | 104 |
| Aston Villa | 2020–21 | FA WSL | 14 | 1 | 0 | 0 | 4 | 2 | — | | — | | 18 | 3 |
| Sporting CP | 2021–22 | Nacional | 20 | 16 | 6 | 2 | 3 | 4 | — | | 1 | 0 | 30 | 22 |
| Sporting CP | 2022–23 | Nacional | 18 | 14 | 1 | 0 | 4 | 2 | — | | 2 | 1 | 25 | 17 |
| Sporting CP | 2023–24 | Nacional | 18 | 9 | 4 | 3 | 3 | 2 | — | | 1 | 0 | 26 | 14 |
| Sporting CP | 2024–25 | Nacional | 16 | 5 | 2 | 1 | 4 | 2 | 4 | 0 | 0 | 0 | 0 | 0 |
| Sporting CP | Total | | 72 | 44 | 13 | 6 | 14 | 10 | 4 | 0 | 4 | 1 | 81 | 53 |
| Benfica | 2025–26 | Nacional | 13 | 7 | 3 | 1 | 0 | 0 | 0 | 0 | 1 | 1 | 19 | 9 |
| Career total | | | 201 | 128 | 31 | 27 | 21 | 15 | 10 | 5 | 8 | 2 | 272 | 182 |

=== International ===
International goals by date, venue, opponent, score, result and competition
| No. | Date | Venue | Opponent | Score | Result | Competition | Ref. |
|---|---|---|---|---|---|---|---|
| 1 | 9 March 2016 | Estádio Municipal Da Bela Vista, Parchal, Portugal | Denmark | 1–2 | 1–3 | 2016 Algarve Cup | |
| 2 | 24 November 2017 | Estádio do Bonfim, Setúbal, Portugal | Moldova | 4–0 | 8–0 | 2019 FIFA Women's World Cup qualification | |
| 3 | 21 January 2018 | Estádio de São Miguel, Ponta Delgada, Portugal | Republic of Ireland | 1–3 | 1–3 | Friendly | |
| 4 | 5 March 2018 | Estádio Algarve, Algarve, Portugal | Norway | 2–0 | 2–0 | 2018 Algarve Cup | |
| 5 | 30 June 2018 | Zimbru Stadium, Chișinău, Moldova | Moldova | 5–0 | 7–0 | 2019 FIFA Women's World Cup qualification | |
| 6 | 30 June 2018 | Zimbru Stadium, Chișinău, Moldova | Moldova | 6–0 | 7–0 | 2019 FIFA Women's World Cup qualification | |
| 7 | 4 September 2018 | Estádio Dr. Machado de Matos, Felgueiras, Portugal | Romania | 4–1 | 5–1 | 2019 FIFA Women's World Cup qualification | |
| 8 | 4 September 2018 | Estádio Dr. Machado de Matos, Felgueiras, Portugal | Romania | 5–1 | 5–1 | 2019 FIFA Women's World Cup qualification | |
| 9 | 17 January 2019 | Estádio Municipal de Abrantes, Abrantes, Portugal | Ukraine | 1–0 | 1–1 | Friendly | |
| 10 | 20 January 2019 | Estádio António Alves Vieira, Torres Novas, Portugal | Ukraine | 2–0 | 3–0 | Friendly | |
| 11 | 1 March 2019 | Estádio Municipal Albufeira, Albufeira, Portugal | Sweden | 1–1 | 2–1 | 2019 Algarve Cup | |
| 12 | 9 April 2019 | Complexo Desp. Alverca, Alverca do Ribatejo, Portugal | Hungary | 1–0 | 4–1 | Friendly | |
| 13 | 4 March 2020 | Estádio Algarve, Algarve, Portugal | Italy | 1–0 | 1–2 | 2020 Algarve Cup | |
| 14 | 23 October 2020 | AEK Arena – Georgios Karapatakis, Larnaca, Cyprus | Cyprus | 2–0 | 3–0 | UEFA Women's Euro 2022 qualifying | |
| 15 | 26 October 2021 | Plovdiv Stadium, Plovdiv, Bulgaria] | Bulgaria | 2–0 | 5–0 | 2023 FIFA Women's World Cup qualification | |
| 16 | 26 October 2021 | Plovdiv Stadium, Plovdiv, Bulgaria] | Bulgaria | 3–0 | 5–0 | 2023 FIFA Women's World Cup qualification | |
| 17 | 12 April 2022 | Estádio Cidade de Barcelos, Barcelos, Portugal | Bulgaria | 1–0 | 3–0 | 2023 FIFA Women's World Cup qualification | |
| 18 | 22 June 2022 | Estádio do Restelo, Lisbon, Portugal | Greece | 1–0 | 4–0 | Friendly | |
| 19 | 13 July 2022 | Leigh Sports Village, Leigh, England | Netherlands | 2–2 | 2–3 | UEFA Women's Euro 2022 | |
| 20 | 6 October 2022 | Estádio do FC Vizela, Vizela, Cyprus | Belgium | 1–0 | 2–1 | 2023 Women's World Cup qualifying play-offs | |
| 21 | 12 October 2022 | Estádio da Mata Real, Paços de Ferreira, Portugal | Iceland | 2–1 | 4–1 | 2023 FIFA Women's World Cup qualification | |
| 22 | 5 April 2024 | Estádio Dr. Magalhães Pessoa, Leiria, Portugal | Bosnia and Herzegovina | 3–0 | 3–0 | UEFA Women's Euro 2025 qualifying | |
| 23 | 25 October 2024 | Dalga Arena, Baku, Azerbaijan | Azerbaijan | 4–1 | 4–1 | UEFA Women's Euro 2025 qualifying play-offs | |
| 24 | 29 October 2024 | Estádio do Futebol Clube de Vizela, Vizela, Portugal | Azerbaijan | 1–0 | 4–0 | UEFA Women's Euro 2025 qualifying play-offs | |
| 25 | 29 October 2024 | Estádio do Futebol Clube de Vizela, Vizela, Portugal | Azerbaijan | 2–0 | 4–0 | UEFA Women's Euro 2025 qualifying play-offs | |
| 26 | 3 December 2024 | Na Stínadlech, Teplice, Czech Republic | Czech Republic | 1–0 | 2–1 | UEFA Women's Euro 2025 qualifying play-offs | |
| 27 | 3 December 2024 | Na Stínadlech, Teplice, Czech Republic | Czech Republic | 2–1 | 2–1 | UEFA Women's Euro 2025 qualifying play-offs | |

== Honours ==
Atlético Ouriense

- Campeonato Nacional de Futebol Feminino: 2012–13, 2013–14
- Campeonato Nacional II Divisão Feminino: 2011–12
- Taça de Portugal Feminina: 2013–14

Sporting CP

- Campeonato Nacional Feminino: 2016–17, 2017–18
- Taça de Portugal Feminina: 2016–17, 2017–18, 2021–22
- Supertaça de Portugal Feminina: 2017, 2021, 2024
