= Chloe Arthur =

Scottish footballer (born 1995)

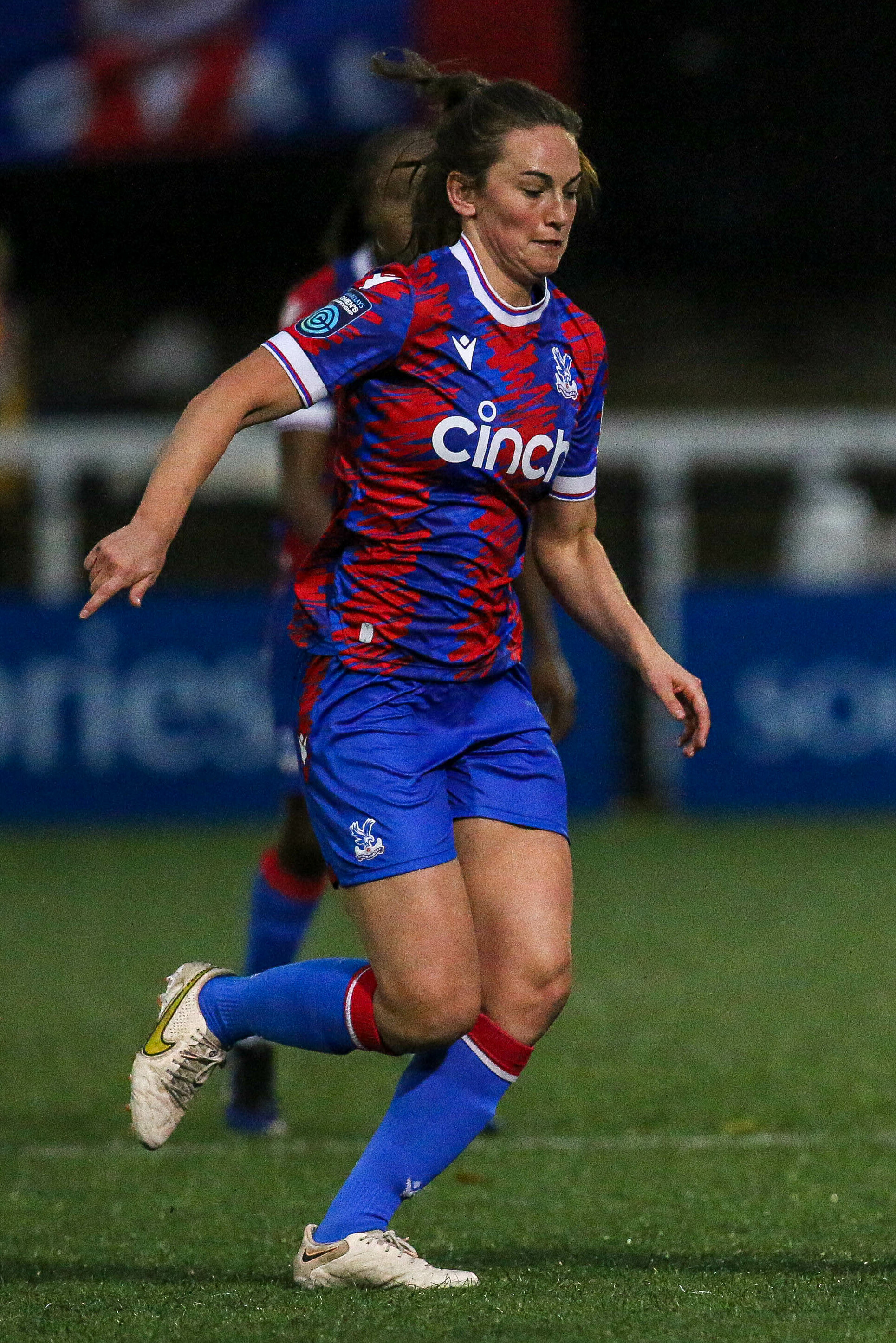
- Arthur with Crystal Palace in 2022

Personal information
- Full name: Chloe Susan Arthur
- Date of birth: 21 January 1995 (age 31)
- Place of birth: Erskine, Scotland
- Height: 1.69 m (5 ft 7 in)
- Position: Midfielder

Team information
- Current team: Celtic
- Number: 77

Youth career
- Celtic Erskine Y.F.C

Senior career*
Years	Team	Apps	(Gls)
2011–2014	Celtic	41	(6)
2015	Hibernian		
2016–2018	Bristol City	35	(4)
2018–2020	Birmingham City	31	(1)
2020–2022	Aston Villa	34	(1)
2022–2026	Crystal Palace	36	(1)
2026–	Celtic	1	(0)

International career^{‡}
2010–2012	Scotland U17	14	(0)
2012–2014	Scotland U19	22	(0)
2015–	Scotland	35	(2)
- * Club domestic league appearances and goals as of 17:31, 18 May 2026 (UTC) ‡ National team caps and goals as of 17:31, 18 May 2026 (UTC)

Chloe Susan Arthur (born 21 January 1995) is a Scottish footballer who plays as a midfielder for Celtic F.C. Women in the Scottish Women's Premier League and the Scotland national team.

== Club career ==
Arthur broke into the Celtic first team aged 17, coming through the club's Youth Academy. In December 2014, Arthur transferred together with Heather Richards from Celtic to Hibernian, where she was part of the team that reached the Scottish Cup final and finished second in the league.

In January 2016, after a year in Edinburgh, she joined Bristol City in the FA WSL 2. On 14 February, she scored on her Bristol debut in a 7–1 win against Queens Park Rangers in the FA Cup. She finished her first season at the club with three goals in 20 appearances. On 8 February 2017, Bristol announced that Arthur had signed new deal with the club. She finished her second season with two goals in 8 appearances. In July 2017, she signed a new contract with the Vixens.

On 25 July 2018, Arthur joined Birmingham City on a two-year deal.

Arthur joined Aston Villa, who had just been promoted to the WSL, in July 2020. She was released by Villa during the summer of 2022 after two years at the club.

Following her release Arthur signed for Championship club Crystal Palace and was part of the team that won the Women’s Championship in 2023-24 gaining promotion to the Women’s Super League for the first ever time in the clubs history.

In June 2024 she signed a one-year contract extension keeping her at the club until the end of the 2024-25 season. On the 11 June 2025, Palace exercised the option to extend Arthur’s contract by another year keep her at the club until the end of the 2025/26 season.

That season Crystal Palace came from 11th place in the league in November to finishing runners-up in the Championship missing out on first place by goal difference and gaining automatic promotion again to the Super League.

Two weeks later Arthur announced that she would be leaving the club after four years and two promotions.

On 8 August 2026, Arthur was announced at Celtic.

== International career ==
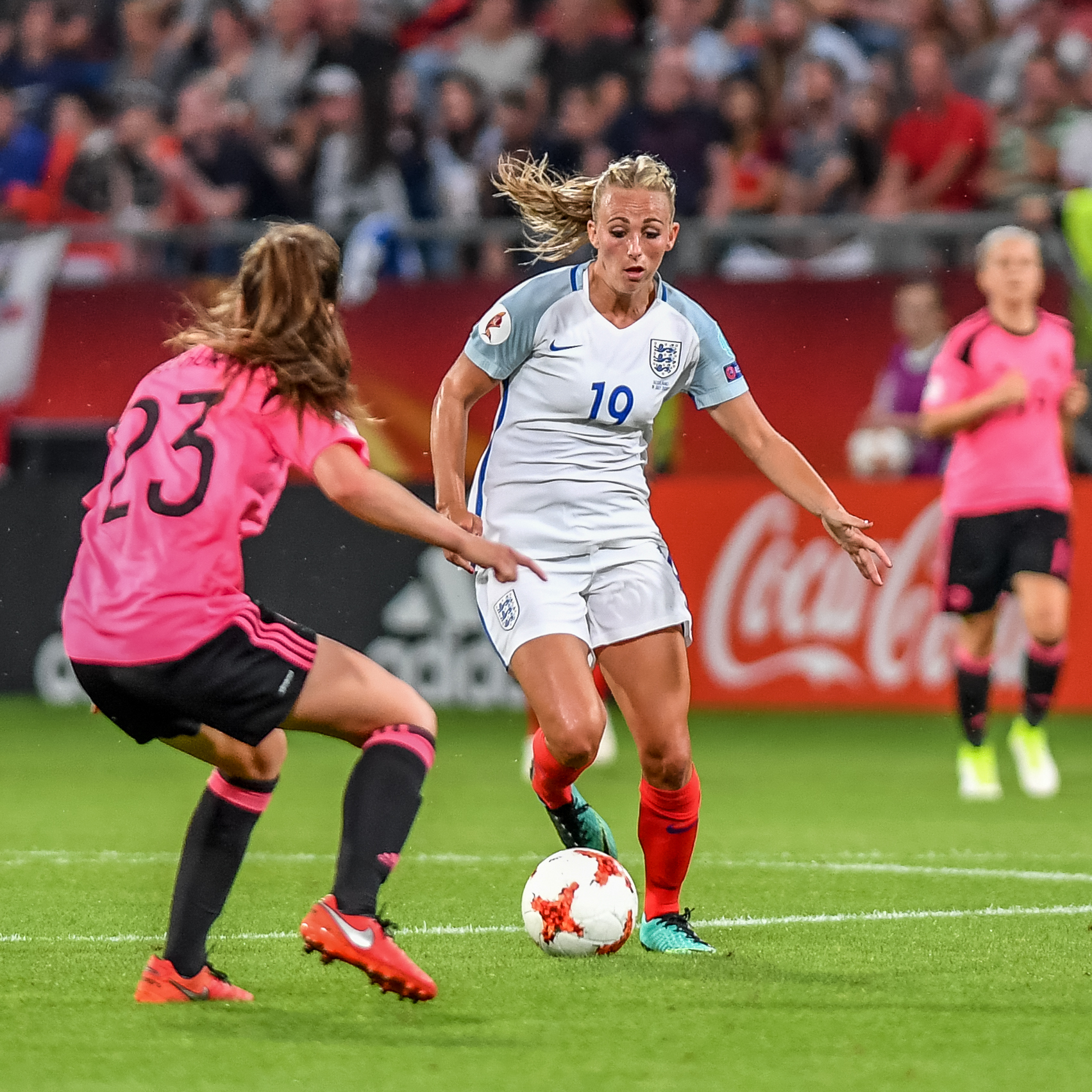
Arthur (number 23) playing for Scotland in Euro 2017

Arthur represented Scotland at under-17 and under-19 levels.

On 8 February 2015, she made her senior debut for Scotland, coming on as a 63rd-minute substitute for Fiona Brown in a 4–0 win against Northern Ireland. Arthur was named in the Scotland squads for both Euro 2017 and the 2019 World Cup, their first appearances in the final stages of those tournaments.

She scored her first goals for Scotland in a 7–1 win against the Faroe Islands on 21 September 2021.

== Personal life ==
Her father Gary was one of ten people killed when a police helicopter crashed into the Clutha Bar, Glasgow, in November 2013.

== Career statistics ==
=== International appearances ===
As of the match played on 11 April 2023

National team	Year	Apps	Goals
Scotland	2015	4	0
Scotland	2016	2	0
Scotland	2017	6	0
Scotland	2018	4	0
Scotland	2019	5	0
Scotland	2020	—	
Scotland	2021	6	2
Scotland	2022	6	0
Scotland	2023	2	0
Total		35	2

=== International goals ===
As of match played 10 June 2021. Scotland score listed first, score column indicates score after each Arnot goal.

International goals by date, venue, opponent, score, result and competition
No.	Date	Venue	Opponent	Score	Result	Competition	Ref.
1	21 September 2021	Hampden Park, Glasgow	Faroe Islands	2–0	7–1	2023 World Cup qualification	
2	21 September 2021	Hampden Park, Glasgow	Faroe Islands	3–0	7–1	2023 World Cup qualification	

== Honours ==
Hibernian

- Scottish Women’s Premier League runner up: 2015
- Scottish Women’s Cup runner up: 2015

Crystal Palace

- Women's Championship: 2023–24 runner up: 2025–26
