= Nadine Hanssen =

Dutch footballer (born 1993)

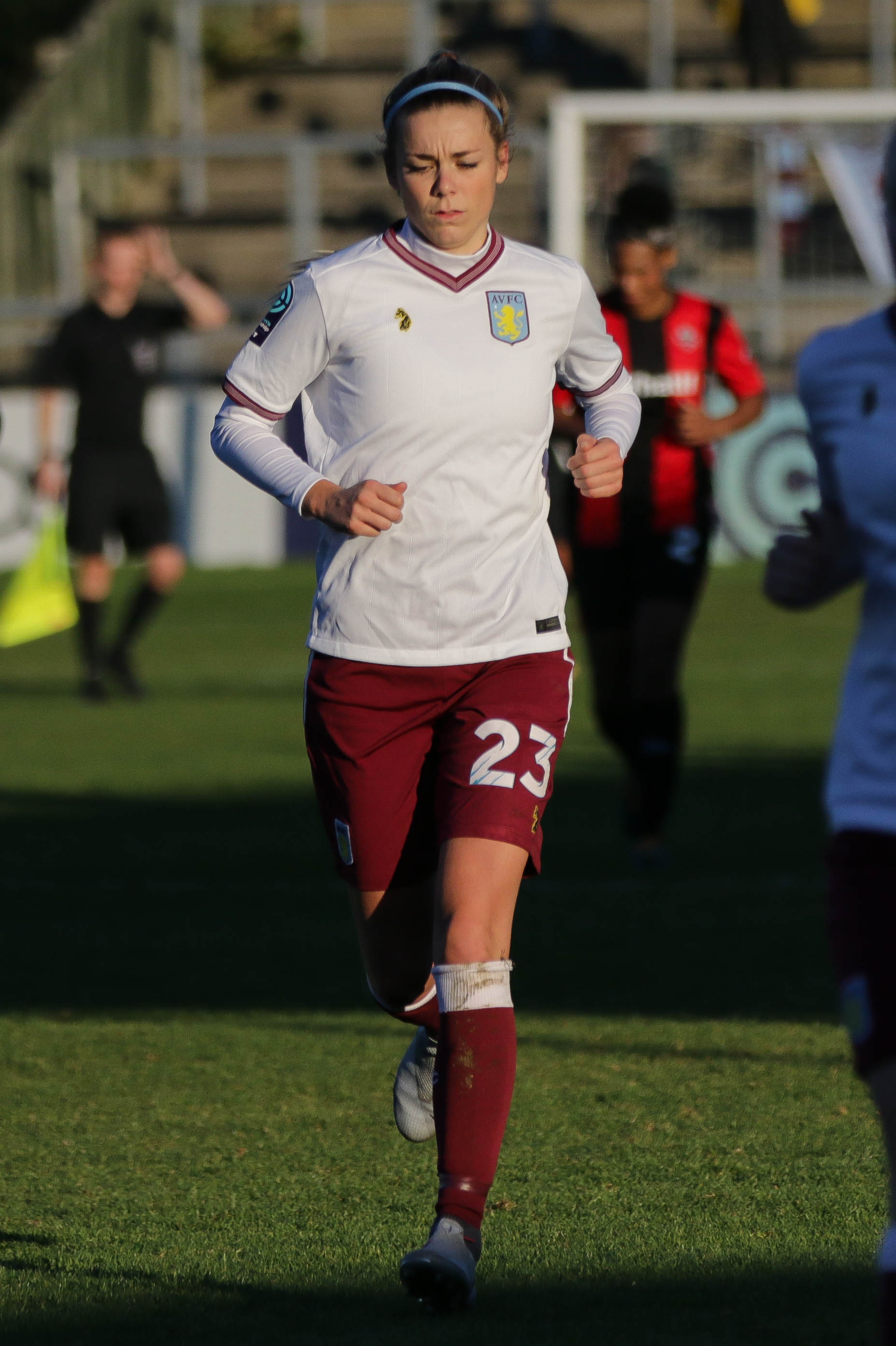
- Hanssen with Aston Villa in 2018

Personal information
- Full name: Nadine Hanssen
- Date of birth: 7 October 1993 (age 33)
- Place of birth: Brunssum, Netherlands
- Position: Midfielder

Team information
- Current team: Aberdeen
- Number: 24

Senior career*
Years	Team	Apps	(Gls)
2012–2013	PSV	7	(0)
2013–2014	Utrecht	15	(0)
2015–2017	Anderlecht	?	(?)
2017–2018	KRC Genk Ladies	?	(?)
2018–2021	Aston Villa	35	(5)
2022–2024	Aberdeen	29	(1)
- * Club domestic league appearances and goals as of 16:19, 5 June 2024 (UTC)

Nadine Hanssen (born 7 October 1993) is a Dutch professional footballer who last played as a midfielder for SWPL1 club Aberdeen.

Hanssen was born in the Netherlands and prior to signing for Aston Villa in 2018, she had played for PSV, Utrecht, Anderlecht and KRC Genk Ladies.

== Club career ==
=== PSV ===
Hanssen made her league debut against Utrecht on 12 October 2012.

=== Aston Villa ===
Hanssen joined Aston Villa in 2018. Hanssen scored on her Aston Villa debut on 18 August against Sheffield United in a 2–1 loss in the WSL cup, scoring in the 54th minute. She scored a hattrick against Coventry United on 10 November 2020. On 18 May 2021, it was announced that her contract would not be extended.

=== Aberdeen ===
On 14 September 2022, Hanssen was announced at Aberdeen Women. She made her league debut against Hearts on 16 October 2022. Hanssen scored her first league goal against Glasgow Women at Pittodrie on 30 October 2022, scoring in the 18th minute. On 14 July 2023, it was announced that she had signed a semi-professional contract with the club. On 20 July 2023, it was announced that Hanssen would captain the side for the 2023–24 season. She became pregnant in late 2023 and the captaincy was passed onto Hannah Stewart.

== Career statistics ==
=== Club ===
As of 22 December 2020.

Club	Season	League			National Cup		League Cup		Other		Total	
Club	Season	Division	Apps	Goals	Apps	Goals	Apps	Goals	Apps	Goals	Apps	Goals
PSV	2012–13	BeNe League	7	0	0	0	0	0	0	0	7	0
Utrecht	2013–14	BeNe League	15	0	0	0	0	0	0	0	0	
Aston Villa	2018–19	Women's Championship	17	1	0	0	5 (Note: Appearances in the FA Women's League Cup)	2	0	0	22	3
Aston Villa	2019–20	Women's Championship	11	3	0	0	5	0	0	0	16	3
Aston Villa	2020–21	FA WSL	5	1	0	0	3	3	0	0	8	4
Aston Villa	Total		35	5	0	0	13	5	0	0	46	10
Career total			55	5	0	0	13	5	0	0	68	10

== Personal life ==
Hanssen studied economics at the Johan Cruijff University. She moved to Aberdeen with her partner Kelle Roos. She decided to restart her own football career after the birth of their son Romeo in December 2021.
