= Caroline Siems =

German footballer

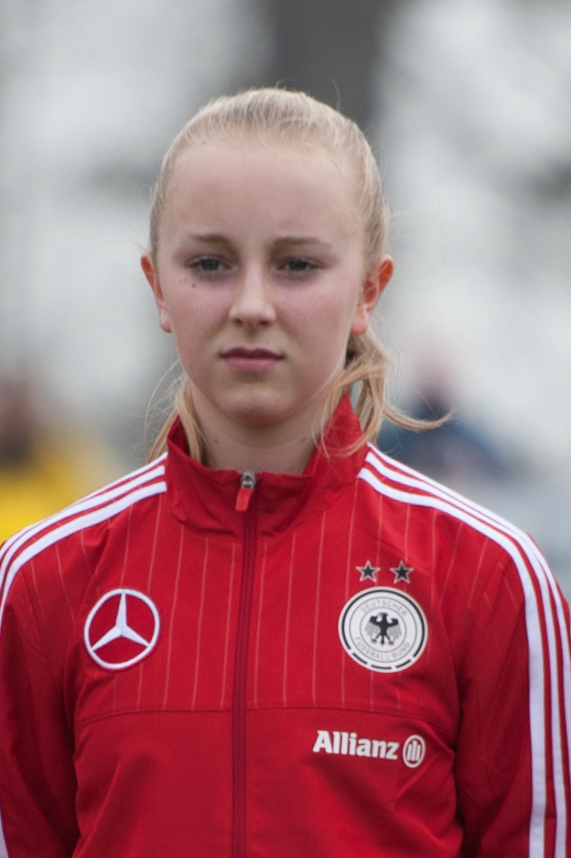
- Siems in 2016

Personal information
- Date of birth: 9 May 1999 (age 27)
- Place of birth: Berlin, Germany
- Height: 1.63 m (5 ft 4 in)
- Position: Full-back

Team information
- Current team: Werder Bremen
- Number: 21

Youth career
- 2010–2015: Viktoria Berlin

Senior career*
Years	Team	Apps	(Gls)
2015–2018	Turbine Potsdam II	23	(5)
2017–2020	Turbine Potsdam	28	(2)
2020–2021	Aston Villa	13	(0)
2021–2024	Bayer Leverkusen	38	(3)
2024–	Werder Bremen	0	(0)

International career^{‡}
2013	Germany U15	2	(0)
2016	Germany U17	13	(0)
2017	Germany U19	11	(2)
2017	Germany U20	1	(0)
- * Club domestic league appearances and goals as of 23:16, 18 July 2024 (UTC) ‡ National team caps and goals as of 17:02, 11 October 2020 (UTC)

Caroline Siems (born 9 May 1999) is a German footballer who plays as a full-back for Frauen-Bundesliga club Werder Bremen. She has represented Germany internationally at several youth levels.

== Early and personal life ==
Siems was born in Berlin.

== Club career ==
Siems played youth football with Viktoria Berlin and senior football with Turbine Potsdam II and Turbine Potsdam before signing for Aston Villa in 2020. In May 2021, it was announced that Siems would leave the club upon the expiry of her contract at the end of the following month.

On 10 May 2024, Frauen-Bundesliga club Werder Bremen announced that Siems had signed for the 2024–25 season, joining from league rivals Bayer Leverkusen. She moved to the club as a replacement for the departing Chiara Hahn.

== International career ==
Siems has represented Germany at under-15, under-17, under-19 and under-20 levels.
