= 2019–20 Manchester United W.F.C. season =

Manchester United Women
2019–20 season
- Co-chairmen: Joel and Avram Glazer
- Manager: Casey Stoney
- Stadium: Leigh Sports Village
- FA WSL: 4th
- FA Cup: Fourth round
- League Cup: Semi-finals
- Top goalscorer: League: Lauren James (6); All: Lauren James (9)
- Highest home attendance: 4,042 (vs. Manchester City, 20 October)
- Lowest home attendance: League: 1,707 (vs. Brighton & Hove Albion, 24 November); All: 642 (vs. Brighton & Hove Albion, 15 January, League Cup)
- Average home league attendance: 2,103
| Home colours | Away colours | Third colours |

The 2019–20 season was Manchester United Women's second season since they were founded and their first in the FA Women's Super League, the professional top-flight women's league in England. The club also competed in the FA Cup and League Cup.

Following the departure of Alex Greenwood in August 2019, Katie Zelem was named as her successor as club captain.

On 13 March 2020, in line with the FA's response to the coronavirus pandemic, it was announced the season was temporarily suspended until at least 3 April 2020. After later extending the postponement until 30 April, on 3 April, the FA announced that the WSL and Women's Championship would be suspended indefinitely. The season was ultimately ended prematurely on 25 May 2020 with immediate effect.

== Pre-season ==
United prepared for their debut season as a top-flight team with their first ever game against foreign opposition, traveling to Norway to play Toppserien side Vålerenga on 31 July, in conjunction with the men's team who played in the same city the day before. United also faced Norwegian third division side Sandefjord on 3 August and preceded their trip abroad with a closed-doors friendly at home to Blackburn Rovers.

| Date | Opponents | H / A | Result F–A | Scorers | Attendance |
|---|---|---|---|---|---|
| 24 July 2019 | Blackburn Rovers | H | Behind closed doors, no official scoreline | | |
| 31 July 2019 | Vålerenga | A | 1–4 | Sigsworth 24' | 7,124 |
| 3 August 2019 | Sandefjord | A | 5–0 | Green 12', Toone 35', Ross 40', Ladd 61', Sigsworth 67' | |

== FA Women's Super League ==
Following a successful debut season in the FA Women's Championship, Manchester United earned promotion to the FA Women's Super League. On 10 May 2019, the FA confirmed Manchester United had been granted a license to compete in the WSL for the 2019–20 season.

=== Matches ===
The opening weekend WSL fixtures were announced on 1 July 2019 and included the first Manchester derby between the two women's teams with the fixture being played at the City of Manchester Stadium. The remaining league fixtures were announced on 10 July 2019. Manchester United played 14 of the intended 22 league fixtures prior to the season being cut short and were awarded fourth place on a points-per-game basis, the same place they were when the season ended.

| Date | Opponents | H / A | Result F–A | Scorers | Attendance | League position |
|---|---|---|---|---|---|---|
| 7 September 2019 | Manchester City | A | 0–1 | | 31,213 | 11th |
| 16 September 2019 | Arsenal | H | 0–1 | | 2,530 | 12th |
| 28 September 2019 | Liverpool | H | 2–0 | James 71', Zelem 90+5' (pen.) | 2,813 | 6th |
| 13 October 2019 | Tottenham Hotspur | A | 3–0 | Hanson 13', Neville 52' (o.g.), Ross 90+2' | 1,299 | 4th |
| 27 October 2019 | Reading | H | 2–0 | Hanson 16', Sigsworth 85' | 1,997 | 4th |
| 17 November 2019 | Chelsea | A | 0–1 | | 4,790 | 5th |
| 24 November 2019 | Brighton & Hove Albion | H | 4–0 | James 10', Galton (2) 29', 67', Zelem 87' (pen.) | 1,707 | 5th |
| 1 December 2019 | West Ham United | A | 2–3 | Hanson 1', James 80' | 1,736 | 5th |
| 8 December 2019 | Everton | H | 3–1 | James (2) 4', 45', Zelem 11' (pen.) | 1,805 | 4th |
| 15 December 2019 | Birmingham City | A | Postponed due to waterlogged pitch | | | |
| 5 January 2020 | Bristol City | H | 0–1 | | 2,021 | 4th |
| 12 January 2020 | Liverpool | A | Postponed due to waterlogged pitch | | | |
| 19 January 2020 | Tottenham Hotspur | H | 3–0 | Zelem (2) 58' (pen.), 87', Sigsworth 65' | 1,846 | 4th |
| 2 February 2020 | Reading | A | 1–1 | James 30' | 1,256 | 4th |
| 9 February 2020 | Chelsea | H | All WSL games postponed due to Storm Ciara | | | |
| 12 February 2020 | Brighton & Hove Albion | A | 1–1 | Walsh 1' (o.g.) | 903 | 5th |
| 23 February 2020 | Everton | A | 3–2 | Galton (2) 21', 29', Toone 63' | 893 | 4th |
| 22 March 2020 | West Ham United | H | The FA cancelled all remaining leagues fixtures due to the COVID-19 pandemic on 25 May following the previous indefinite suspension of the league announced on 5 April. | | | |
| 25 March 2020 | Birmingham City | A | The FA cancelled all remaining leagues fixtures due to the COVID-19 pandemic on 25 May following the previous indefinite suspension of the league announced on 5 April. | | | |
| 28 March 2020 | Manchester City | H | The FA cancelled all remaining leagues fixtures due to the COVID-19 pandemic on 25 May following the previous indefinite suspension of the league announced on 5 April. | | | |
| 5 April 2020 | Arsenal | A | The FA cancelled all remaining leagues fixtures due to the COVID-19 pandemic on 25 May following the previous indefinite suspension of the league announced on 5 April. | | | |
| 25 April 2020 | Bristol City | A | The FA cancelled all remaining leagues fixtures due to the COVID-19 pandemic on 25 May following the previous indefinite suspension of the league announced on 5 April. | | | |
| 3 May 2020 | Liverpool | A | The FA cancelled all remaining leagues fixtures due to the COVID-19 pandemic on 25 May following the previous indefinite suspension of the league announced on 5 April. | | | |
| 12 May 2020 | Chelsea | H | The FA cancelled all remaining leagues fixtures due to the COVID-19 pandemic on 25 May following the previous indefinite suspension of the league announced on 5 April. | | | |
| 16 May 2020 | Birmingham City | H | The FA cancelled all remaining leagues fixtures due to the COVID-19 pandemic on 25 May following the previous indefinite suspension of the league announced on 5 April. | | | |

=== League table ===
| Pos | Team | Pld | W | D | L | GF | GA | GD | Pts | PPG | Qualification |
|---|---|---|---|---|---|---|---|---|---|---|---|
| 2 | Manchester City | 16 | 13 | 1 | 2 | 39 | 9 | +30 | 40 | 2.50 | Qualification for the Champions League |
| 3 | Arsenal | 15 | 12 | 0 | 3 | 40 | 13 | +27 | 36 | 2.40 | |
| 4 | Manchester United | 14 | 7 | 2 | 5 | 24 | 12 | +12 | 23 | 1.64 | |
| 5 | Reading | 14 | 6 | 3 | 5 | 21 | 24 | −3 | 21 | 1.50 | |
| 6 | Everton | 14 | 6 | 1 | 7 | 21 | 21 | 0 | 19 | 1.36 | |

Source: FA WSL, BBC
Rules for classification: Initially: 1) Points; 2) Goal difference; 3) Number of goals scored. After abandonment of season: 1) Points per game

== Women's FA Cup ==
Manchester United entered the Women's FA Cup in the fourth round with the rest of the top two tiers and were drawn against Manchester City, one of only two all-WSL ties of the round. It was the third time the derby rivals had met in the 2019–20 season having already faced off in the league and League Cup. The match was selected as the televised game of the round live on the BBC Red Button and subsequently rescheduled from the typical Sunday when the rest of the round's fixtures were played, to the preceding Saturday. City won 3–2 with goals from England internationals Ellen White and Jill Scott proving the difference while a controversial no-goal decision put the lack of goal-line technology in women's football under scrutiny. It marked the first time Manchester United had lost the first knockout game of either domestic cup competition at the fourth attempt.

| Date | Round | Opponents | H / A | Result F–A | Scorers | Attendance |
|---|---|---|---|---|---|---|
| 25 January 2020 | Round 4 | Manchester City | H | 2–3 | James 69', Hemp 88' (o.g.) | 1,948 |

== FA Women's League Cup ==
=== Group stage ===
Manchester United were entered into Group C for the 2019–20 League Cup alongside fellow WSL teams Birmingham City, Everton and Manchester City, and Championship side Leicester City. On 21 November 2019, United defeated Leicester City 11–1 to set a new club record home win and the second largest margin of victory in the competition's history, bettered only by Chelsea's 13–0 victory over London Bees in 2014. Ella Toone also matched the club record for goals in a single game with five.

| Date | Opponents | H / A | Result F–A | Scorers | Attendance | Group position |
|---|---|---|---|---|---|---|
| 20 October 2019 | Manchester City | H | 2–0 | Zelem 7', Sigsworth 54' | 4,042 | 3rd |
| 3 November 2019 | Everton | A | 3–0 | James 22', Zelem 78' (pen.), A. Turner 87' | 361 | 1st |
| 21 November 2019 | Leicester City | H | 11–1 | Sigsworth 2', Arnot 7', Toone (5) 21', 43', 45', 73', 87', Smith 40', Ross 70', Ladd 83', James 90+1' | 1,127 | 1st |
| 11 December 2019 | Birmingham City | A | 3–1 | Arnot 1', Ross 27', Toone 90+3' | 442 | 1st |

| Pos | Team | Pld | W | WPEN | LPEN | L | GF | GA | GD | Pts | Qualification | MNU | MCI | BIR | EVE | LEI |
|---|---|---|---|---|---|---|---|---|---|---|---|---|---|---|---|---|
| 1 | Manchester United | 4 | 4 | 0 | 0 | 0 | 19 | 2 | +17 | 12 | Advance to knock-out stage | — | 2–0 | — | — | 11–1 |
| 2 | Manchester City | 4 | 3 | 0 | 0 | 1 | 11 | 4 | +7 | 9 | Advance to knock-out stage | — | — | 2–1 | — | 5–0 |
| 3 | Birmingham City | 4 | 2 | 0 | 0 | 2 | 8 | 6 | +2 | 6 | | 1–3 | — | — | 1–0 | — |
| 4 | Everton | 4 | 1 | 0 | 0 | 3 | 5 | 8 | −3 | 3 | | 0–3 | 1–4 | — | — | — |
| 5 | Leicester City | 4 | 0 | 0 | 0 | 4 | 2 | 25 | −23 | 0 | | — | — | 1–5 | 0–4 | — |

Updated to match(es) played on 11 December 2019. Source: thefa.com
Rules for classification: 1) Points; 2) Goal difference; 3) Number of goals scored; 4) Number of wins; 5) Head-to-head record

=== Knockout phase ===
United qualified top of their group for the second consecutive season, guaranteeing themselves a quarter-final home tie in the process. A 2–1 win over Brighton & Hove Albion saw United reach the semi-final stage for the second consecutive season, setting up a home tie with Chelsea. The London side booked their place in the final with a 1–0 win, a repeat of the narrow scoreline in the team's only other previous meeting, with Chelsea later going on to win the final.

| Date | Round | Opponents | H / A | Result F–A | Scorers | Attendance |
|---|---|---|---|---|---|---|
| 15 January 2020 | Quarter-final | Brighton & Hove Albion | H | 2–1 | McManus 13', Ross 75' | 642 |
| 29 January 2020 | Semi-final | Chelsea | H | 0–1 | | 1,044 |

== Squad statistics ==
Numbers in brackets denote appearances as substitute.
Key to positions: GK – Goalkeeper; DF – Defender; MF – Midfielder; FW – Forward

| No. | Pos. | Name | League | | FA Cup | | League Cup | | Total | | Discipline | |
| No. | Pos. | Name | Apps | Goals | Apps | Goals | Apps | Goals | Apps | Goals | Yellow card | Red card |
|---|---|---|---|---|---|---|---|---|---|---|---|---|
| 1 | GK | (England) Siobhan Chamberlain | 0 | 0 | 0 | 0 | 0 | 0 | 0 | 0 | 0 | 0 |
| 2 | DF | (England) Martha Harris | 9 (2) | 0 | 0 | 0 | 3 (2) | 0 | 12 (4) | 0 | 0 | 0 |
| 3 | DF | (Sweden) Lotta Ökvist | 3 | 0 | 0 | 0 | 2 (1) | 0 | 5 (1) | 0 | 0 | 0 |
| 4 | DF | (England) Amy Turner | 11 (2) | 0 | 1 | 0 | 4 (1) | 1 | 16 (3) | 1 | 3 | 0 |
| 5 | DF | (England) Abbie McManus | 11 | 0 | 1 | 0 | 6 | 1 | 18 | 1 | 3 | 0 |
| 6 | MF | (England) Aimee Palmer | 0 | 0 | 0 | 0 | 0 | 0 | 0 | 0 | 0 | 0 |
| 7 | FW | (England) Ella Toone | 5 (8) | 1 | 0 | 0 | 3 (2) | 6 | 8 (10) | 7 | 3 | 1 |
| 8 | MF | (England) Mollie Green | 0 | 0 | 0 | 0 | 2 | 0 | 2 | 0 | 0 | 0 |
| 9 | FW | (England) Jessica Sigsworth | 7 (7) | 2 | 1 | 0 | 4 (1) | 2 | 12 (8) | 4 | 2 | 0 |
| 10 | MF | (England) Katie Zelem (c) | 13 (1) | 5 | 1 | 0 | 6 | 2 | 20 (1) | 7 | 4 | 0 |
| 11 | FW | (England) Leah Galton | 12 | 4 | 0 | 0 | 2 | 0 | 14 | 4 | 0 | 0 |
| 12 | MF | (Wales) Hayley Ladd | 14 | 0 | 1 | 0 | 4 (2) | 1 | 19 (2) | 1 | 4 | 0 |
| 13 | GK | (England) Emily Ramsey | 0 | 0 | 0 | 0 | 1 | 0 | 1 | 0 | 0 | 0 |
| 14 | MF | (Netherlands) Jackie Groenen | 12 | 0 | 1 | 0 | 3 | 0 | 16 | 0 | 0 | 0 |
| 15 | GK | (Norway) Aurora Mikalsen | 0 | 0 | 0 | 0 | 1 | 0 | 1 | 0 | 0 | 0 |
| 16 | MF | (England) Lauren James | 9 (3) | 6 | 0 (1) | 1 | 2 (3) | 2 | 11 (7) | 9 | 6 | 1 |
| 17 | FW | (Scotland) Lizzie Arnot | 0 (4) | 0 | 0 (1) | 0 | 3 (2) | 2 | 3 (7) | 2 | 0 | 0 |
| 18 | FW | (Scotland) Kirsty Hanson | 6 (5) | 3 | 1 | 0 | 4 | 0 | 11 (5) | 3 | 0 | 0 |
| 19 | FW | (Scotland) Jane Ross | 7 (4) | 1 | 1 | 0 | 3 (3) | 3 | 11 (7) | 4 | 0 | 0 |
| 20 | DF | (Scotland) Kirsty Smith | 7 (1) | 0 | 1 | 0 | 4 | 1 | 12 (1) | 1 | 2 | 0 |
| 21 | DF | (England) Millie Turner | 14 | 0 | 1 | 0 | 5 | 0 | 20 | 0 | 1 | 0 |
| 22 | GK | (England) Fran Bentley | 0 | 0 | 0 | 0 | 0 | 0 | 0 | 0 | 0 | 0 |
| 23 | DF | (Scotland) Charlotte Newsham | 0 | 0 | 0 | 0 | 0 | 0 | 0 | 0 | 0 | 0 |
| 24 | FW | (England) Maria Edwards | 0 | 0 | 0 | 0 | 0 | 0 | 0 | 0 | 0 | 0 |
| 25 | MF | (Wales) Chloe Williams | 0 | 0 | 0 | 0 | 0 | 0 | 0 | 0 | 0 | 0 |
| 26 | MF | (England) Rebecca May | 0 (1) | 0 | 0 | 0 | 0 | 0 | 0 (1) | 0 | 0 | 0 |
| 27 | GK | (England) Mary Earps | 14 | 0 | 1 | 0 | 4 | 0 | 19 | 0 | 0 | 0 |
| — | — | Own goals | — | 2 | — | 1 | — | 0 | — | 3 | — | — |

== Transfers ==
=== In ===
| Date | Pos. | Name | From | Ref. |
|---|---|---|---|---|
| 1 July 2019 (Note: Deal agreed 22 May 2019) | MF | (Netherlands) Jackie Groenen | (Germany) 1. FFC Frankfurt | |
| 1 July 2019 (Note: Deal agreed 24 May 2019) | DF | (England) Abbie McManus | (England) Manchester City | |
| 1 July 2019 (Note: Deal agreed 5 June 2019) | MF | (Wales) Hayley Ladd | (England) Birmingham City | |
| 4 July 2019 | FW | (Scotland) Jane Ross | (England) West Ham United | |
| 12 July 2019 | GK | (England) Mary Earps | (Germany) VfL Wolfsburg | |
| 20 August 2019 | DF | (Sweden) Lotta Ökvist | (Sweden) Hammarby IF | |
| 6 September 2019 | GK | (Norway) Aurora Mikalsen | (Norway) Kolbotn | |

=== Out ===
| Date | Pos. | Name | To | Ref. |
|---|---|---|---|---|
| 15 May 2019 | MF | (England) Charlie Devlin | (England) Charlton Athletic (Note: Released, joined Charlton Athletic on 9 August 2019) | |
| 15 May 2019 | DF | (England) Naomi Hartley | (England) Sheffield United (Note: Released, joined Sheffield United on 4 July 2019) | |
| 15 May 2019 | DF | (England) Lucy Roberts | (United States) South Florida Bulls (Note: Released, enrolled at University of South Florida on 17 July 2019) | |
| 15 May 2019 | FW | (England) Ebony Salmon | (England) Bristol City (Note: Released, joined Bristol City on 15 July 2019) | |
| 8 August 2019 | DF | (England) Alex Greenwood | (France) Lyon | |

=== Loans out ===
| Date from | Date to | Pos. | Name | To | Ref. |
|---|---|---|---|---|---|
| 17 August 2019 | End of season | DF | (Scotland) Charlotte Newsham | (England) Huddersfield Town | |
| 21 August 2019 | 23 January 2020 | MF | (England) Aimee Palmer | (England) Sheffield United | |
| 11 January 2020 | End of season | MF | (England) Mollie Green | (England) Sheffield United | |
| 24 January 2020 | End of season | GK | (England) Emily Ramsey | (England) Sheffield United | |
