= Aimee Palmer =

English footballer

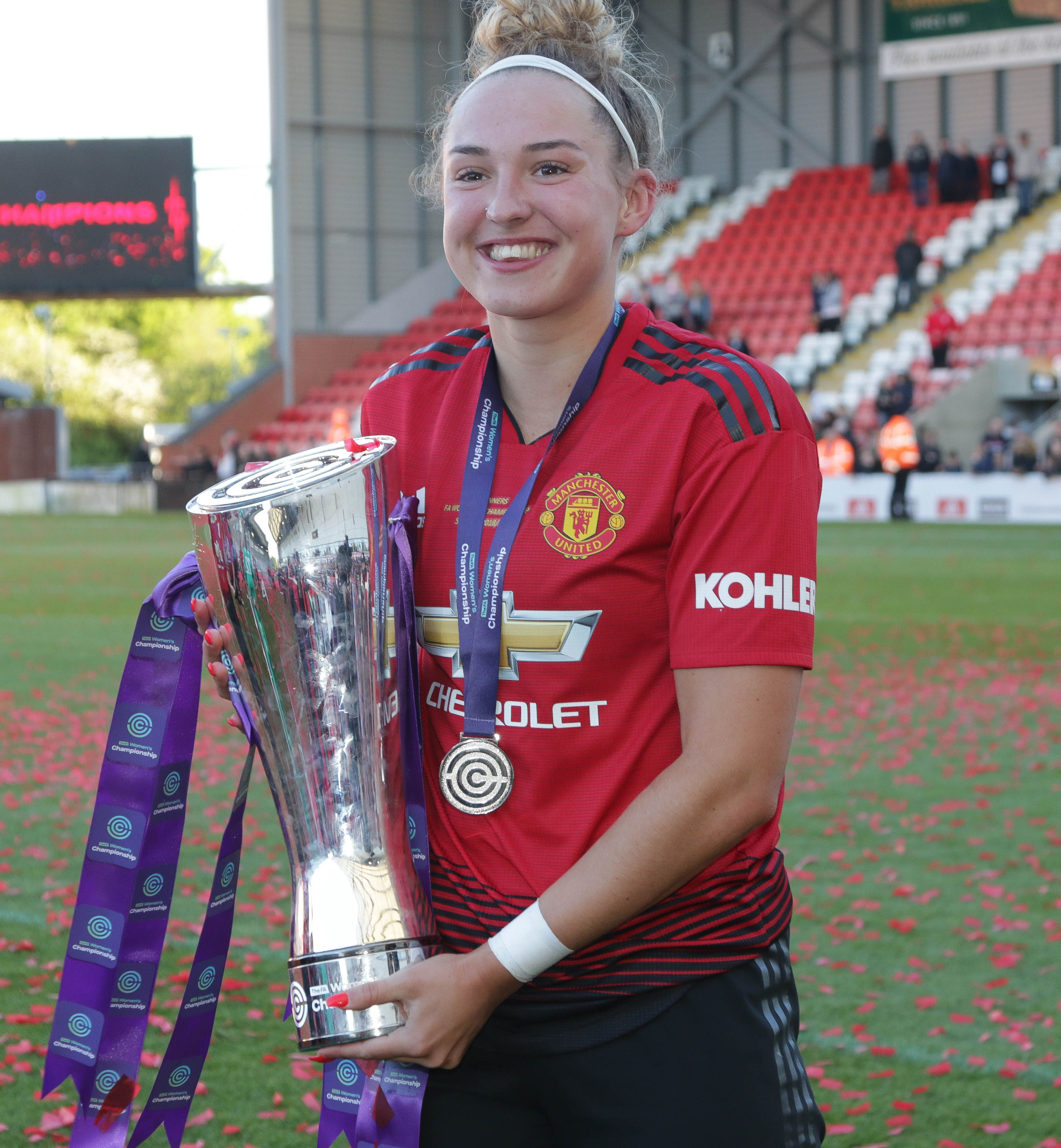
- Aimee Palmer on 11 May 2019

Personal information
- Full name: Aimee Rose Palmer
- Date of birth: 25 July 2000 (age 26)
- Place of birth: Wymondham, England
- Position: Midfielder

Team information
- Current team: Ipswich Town

Senior career*
Years	Team	Apps	(Gls)
2017–2018	Bristol City	14	(0)
2018–2020	Manchester United	13	(1)
2019–2020	→ Sheffield United (loan)	12	(5)
2020–2023	Bristol City	47	(5)
2023–2024	Leicester City	7	(1)
2024–2026	Southampton	36	(4)
2026–	Ipswich Town	0+	(0+)

International career^{‡}
2017	England U17	7	(1)
2018–	England U19	16	(7)
2019–	England U21	5	(1)
- * Club domestic league appearances and goals as of 15:47, 1 October 2023 (UTC) ‡ National team caps and goals as of 8 March 2020

Aimee Rose Palmer (born 25 July 2000) is an English footballer who plays as a midfielder for Women's Championship club Ipswich Town. She has previously played for Manchester United, Sheffield United, Bristol City and Southampton in the Championship, and has represented England at under-17, under-19 and under-21 level.

== Club career ==
=== Bristol City ===
Palmer broke into the first-team making her senior debut in the WSL 1 on 22 April 2017, as a substitute for Jasmine Matthews in a 3–1 loss to Reading. She went on to feature in three of Bristol's Spring Series games in 2017. This led to more first team opportunities in the 2017–18 season. On 12 October 2017, she made her season debut coming on as a 19th-minute substitute for Poppy Wilson in Bristol's 2–0 WSL Cup defeat by Tottenham. On 28 October, she made her first league start of the campaign, in a 5–0 defeat by Reading.

While training with Bristol City, Palmer studied for her A levels in psychology, biology and chemistry at SGS College and was named Student of the Year.

=== Manchester United ===
==== 2018–19 season ====
On 1 July 2018, Palmer joined the newly formed Manchester United to compete in the FA Women's Championship, reuniting with manager Willie Kirk who had been appointed assistant manager at United. She made her competitive debut for Manchester United, as a 61st minute substitute for Mollie Green, in a 2–0 League Cup defeat against Reading on 25 August. On 9 September, Palmer made her Championship debut in a 12–0 win against Aston Villa, coming on as a substitute in the 64th minute for Lauren James. She scored her first ever senior goal on the final day of United's title winning 2018–19 season in a 5–0 victory over Lewes.

==== 2019–20 season: Loan to Sheffield United ====
On 21 August 2019, Palmer joined Sheffield United in the FA Women's Championship on loan for the season. On 25 August, Palmer scored a brace and provided an assist on her debut as part of a 7–1 victory over Leicester City. On 23 January 2020, Manchester United recalled Palmer. At the time of her departure, Palmer ranked as Sheffield United's fourth-highest goalscorer across all competitions. She left Manchester United following the expiration of her contract at the end of the season.

=== Return to Bristol City ===
On 2 July 2020, Palmer rejoined Bristol City, signing a two-year contract with the club. She made her second debut in a 4–0 league loss to Everton.

Palmer was in the first team in January 2023 when Bristol won a 4–0 victory over Oxford United to join the 5th round of the women's FA cup.

=== Leicester City ===
On 1 August 2023, Palmer joined Women's Super League team Leicester City on a one-year contract after winning the Championship with Bristol City.

=== Southampton ===
On 6 August 2024, Palmer joined Women's Championship side Southampton.

=== Ipswich Town ===
On 8 July 2026, Palmer signed for Ipswich Town.

== International career ==
In May 2017, Palmer traveled to the Czech Republic as part of the England under-17 squad to compete in the 2017 UEFA Women's Under-17 Championship. She scored in England's 2–1 group stage defeat by the Netherlands as the team failed to progress to the knockout stage.

On 3 April 2018, Palmer scored on her under-19 debut as England beat Israel 4–1 in an elite round qualifying game for the 2018 UEFA Women's Under-19 Championship. Four months later, in the opening round of qualifying for the 2019 tournament, Palmer scored braces in consecutive games as England eased past Malta and Croatia, 9–0 and 8–0 respectively. In January 2019, she captained the side at the Algarve Tournament. On 28 February 2019, Palmer scored England's goal in a 1–2 defeat to Spain in their opening match of the La Manga Tournament.

In July 2019, Palmer was named in the England squad for the 2019 UEFA Under-19 Championship in Scotland.

== Career statistics ==
=== Club ===
As of match played 3 February 2024

Appearances and goals by club, season and competition
Club	Season	League			FA Cup (Note: Includes the Women's FA Cup)		League Cup (Note: Includes the WSL Cup/Women's League Cup)		Total	
Club	Season	Division	Apps	Goals	Apps	Goals	Apps	Goals	Apps	Goals
Bristol City	2017	Women's Super League	3	0	0	0	0	0	3	0
Bristol City	2017–18	Women's Super League	11	0	0	0	4	0	15	0
Bristol City	Total		14	0	0	0	4	0	18	0
Manchester United	2018–19	Women's Championship	13	1	1	0	1	0	15	1
Manchester United	2019–20	Women's Super League	0	0	0	0	0	0	0	0
Manchester United	Total		13	1	1	0	1	0	15	1
Sheffield United (loan)	2019–20	Women's Championship	12	5	0	0	6	1	18	6
Bristol City	2020–21	Women's Super League	15	0	1	0	4	0	20	0
Bristol City	2021–22	Women's Championship	15	5	2	0	4	0	21	5
Bristol City	2022–23	Women's Championship	18	0	3	0	3	0	24	0
Bristol City	Total		48	5	6	0	11	0	65	5
Leicester City	2023–24	Women's Super League	7	1	1	0	2	1	10	2
Southampton	2024–25	Women's Championship	0	0	0	0	0	0	0	0
Career total			94	12	8	0	24	2	126	14

== Honours ==
Manchester United

- FA Women's Championship: 2018–19

Bristol City

- FA Women's Championship: 2022–23
