= Mollie Green =

English footballer (born 1997)

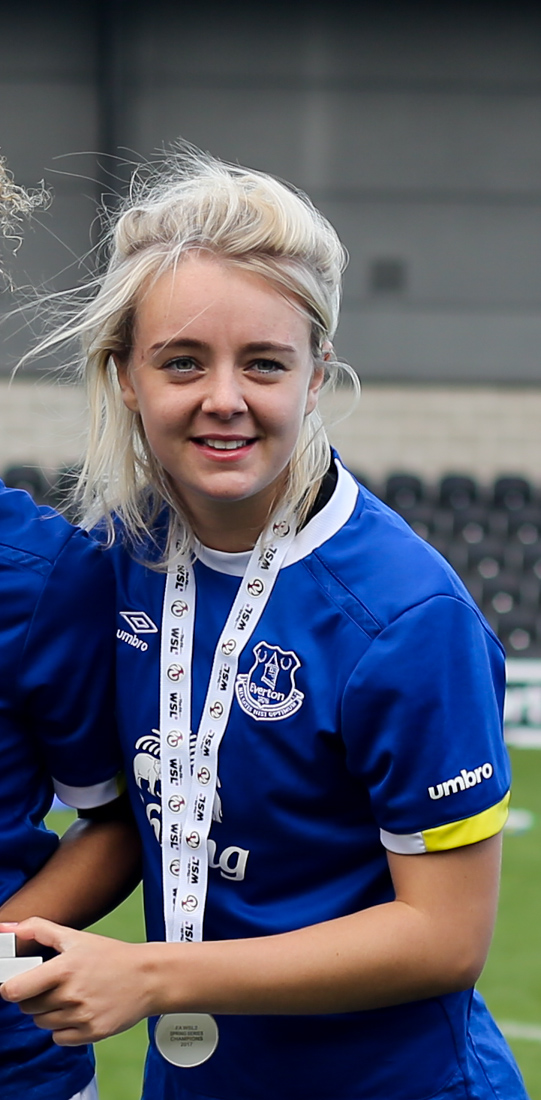
- Green in 2017

Personal information
- Full name: Mollie Green
- Date of birth: 4 August 1997 (age 29)
- Place of birth: England
- Position: Midfielder

Team information
- Current team: Derby County
- Number: 12

Youth career
- Liverpool

Senior career*
Years	Team	Apps	(Gls)
2014–2017	Liverpool	1	(0)
2017–2018	Everton	20	(3)
2018–2020	Manchester United	18	(13)
2020	→ Sheffield United (loan)	3	(2)
2020–2021	Birmingham City	17	(1)
2021–2022	Coventry United	22	(3)
2022–2023	Birmingham City	3	(0)
2023	→ Coventry United (loan)	2	(0)
2023–2026	Nottingham Forest	47	(5)
2026–	Derby County	0	(0)

International career^{‡}
2015–2016	England U19	5	(0)
- * Club domestic league appearances and goals as of 4 May 2026 ‡ National team caps and goals as of 10 April 2016

Mollie Green (born 4 August 1997) is an English footballer who plays as a midfielder for Derby County in the Women's National League North.

She has previously played for Everton, Liverpool, Manchester United and Birmingham City in the FA WSL, Sheffield United and Nottingham Forest in the FA Women's Championship, and has represented England at the under-19 level.

== Club career ==
=== Liverpool ===
Green joined Liverpool in 2014, progressing through the club's Centre of Excellence. On 11 October 2015, she made her competitive debut as a 72nd-minute substitute for Rosie White in the semi-final of the FA WSL Cup, a 2–0 defeat against Notts County. A year later, she made her FA WSL debut in a 3–1 win against Doncaster Rovers Belles. During her 3-year stint at Liverpool, she made three appearances for the senior team.

=== Everton ===
On 28 March 2017, having seen limited minutes for the Reds, Green made the move to their Merseyside rivals Everton in search of more playing time. The following month, she made her Everton debut in a 2–1 defeat against Millwall Lionesses in the FA WSL 2 Spring Series. Green scored her first Everton goal in a 4–0 win against London Bees to help clinch the 2017 Spring Series title.

After the 2017–18 season, Green and Everton mutually agreed to terminate her contract.

=== Manchester United ===
==== 2018–19 season ====
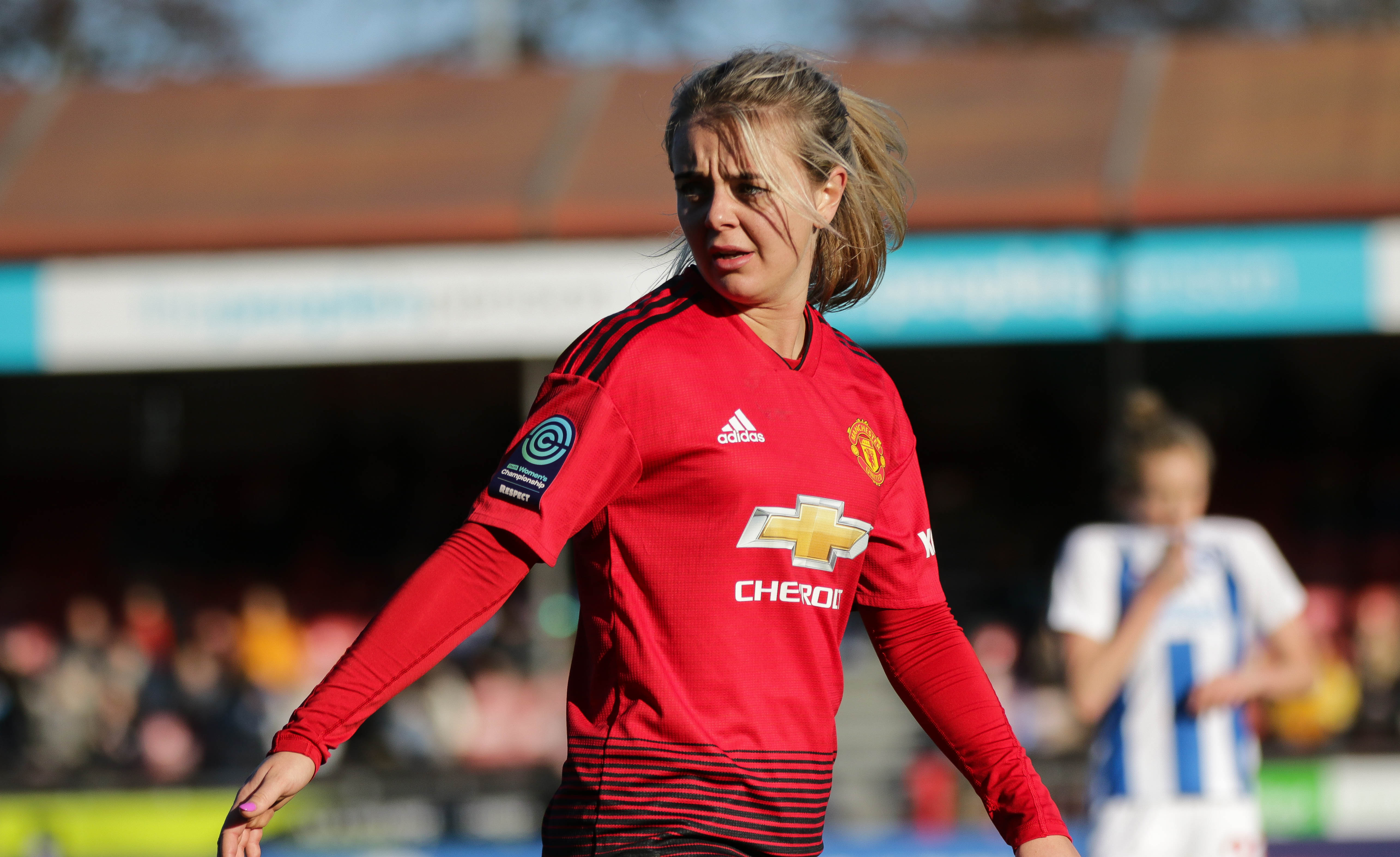
Green playing for Manchester United against Brighton & Hove Albion in 2019.

On 13 July 2018, it was announced that Green would join newly-formed Championship side Manchester United in their inaugural season. She made her competitive debut for Manchester United in a 1–0 League Cup victory against Liverpool on 19 August. She scored her first goal in the opening game of the 2018–19 FA Women's Championship season, a 12–0 win away to Aston Villa. On 25 November, she scored her first career hat-trick in an 8–0 win over Millwall. In total, Green scored 5 goals in 3 games on the way to being named FA Women's Championship player of the month for November.

==== 2019–20 season: Loan to Sheffield United ====
On 11 January 2020, having only made two League Cup appearances for Manchester United in the 2019–20 season, Green joined Championship side Sheffield United on loan for the remainder of the season. She made her debut for the team the next day, coming on as a substitute in 1–0 defeat to promotion rivals Aston Villa. Green scored her first goal for Sheffield United, on her first start, in a 5–0 league win against Coventry United on 19 January 2020. The loan was ultimately cut short due to the suspension and eventual cancellation of the remainder of the season during the coronavirus pandemic.

=== Birmingham City ===
On 4 September 2020, it was announced Green's Manchester United contract had been terminated by mutual consent. Three days later, Birmingham City announced her signing, reuniting Green with newly-appointed manager Carla Ward who had taken Green on loan at Sheffield United the previous season.

=== Nottingham Forest ===
On 5 August 2023, Green joined Nottingham Forest.

On 28 June 2024, Green signed a new contract with Nottingham Forest.

=== Derby County ===
On 9 October 2023, Green joined Derby County.

== International career ==
In 2015, Green made her England under-19 debut in a 2–2 draw against Norway. In July 2015, Green was named in the England under-19 squad for the UEFA Women's Under-19 Championship in Israel. England finished bottom of group B and did not progress.

== Personal life ==
Green attended Savio Salesian College.

== Career statistics ==
=== Club ===
As of match played 1 November 2026.

Club	Season	League			FA Cup (Note: Includes the Women's FA Cup)		League Cup (Note: Includes the WSL Cup/Women's League Cup)		Europe (Note: Includes the UEFA Women's Champions League)		Total	
Club	Season	Division	Apps	Goals	Apps	Goals	Apps	Goals	Apps	Goals	Apps	Goals
Liverpool	2015	Women's Super League 1	0	0	0	0	1	0	0	0	1	0
Liverpool	2016	Women's Super League 1	1	0	1	0	0	0	—		2	0
Liverpool	Total		1	0	1	0	1	0	0	0	3	0
Everton	2017	Women's Super League 2	7	1	0	0	0	0	—		7	1
Everton	2017–18	Women's Super League 1	13	2	3	0	1	0	—		17	2
Everton	Total		20	3	3	0	1	0	—		24	3
Manchester United	2018–19	Women's Championship	18	13	3	1	6	2	—		27	16
Manchester United	2019–20	Women's Super League	0	0	0	0	2	0	—		2	0
Manchester United	Total		18	13	3	1	8	2	—		29	16
Sheffield United (loan)	2019–20	Women's Championship	3	2	1	0	0	0	—		4	2
Birmingham City	2020–21	Women's Super League	17	1	2	1	2	0	—		21	2
Coventry United	2021–22	Women's Championship	22	3	3	0	3	0	—		28	3
Birmingham City	2022–23	Women's Championship	3	0	0	0	1	0	—		4	0
Coventry United (loan)	2022–23	Women's Championship	9	0	1	0	0	0	—		10	0
Nottingham Forest	2023–24	FA WNL Northern Premier Division	18	1	4	1	3 (Note: Appearances in the FA Women's National League Cup)	2	—		25	4
Nottingham Forest	2024–25	FA WNL Northern Premier Division	22	4	4	1	6	0	—		32	5
Nottingham Forest	2025–26	Women's Super League 2	7	0	0	0	2	0	—		9	0
Nottingham Forest	Total		47	5	8	2	11	2	—		66	9
Derby County	2026–27	Women's National League North	0	0	1	0	1 (Note: Appearances in the FA Women's National League Plate)	1	—		2	1
Career total			140	27	23	4	28	5	0	0	191	36

== Honours ==
=== Club ===
Everton

- FA WSL 2 Spring Series: 2017

Manchester United

- FA Women's Championship: 2018–19

Nottingham Forest

- FA Women's National League North: 2024-25
- FA Women's National League Cup: 2024-25

=== Individual ===
- FA Women's Championship Player of the Month: November 2018
