= Naomi Hartley =

English association football player

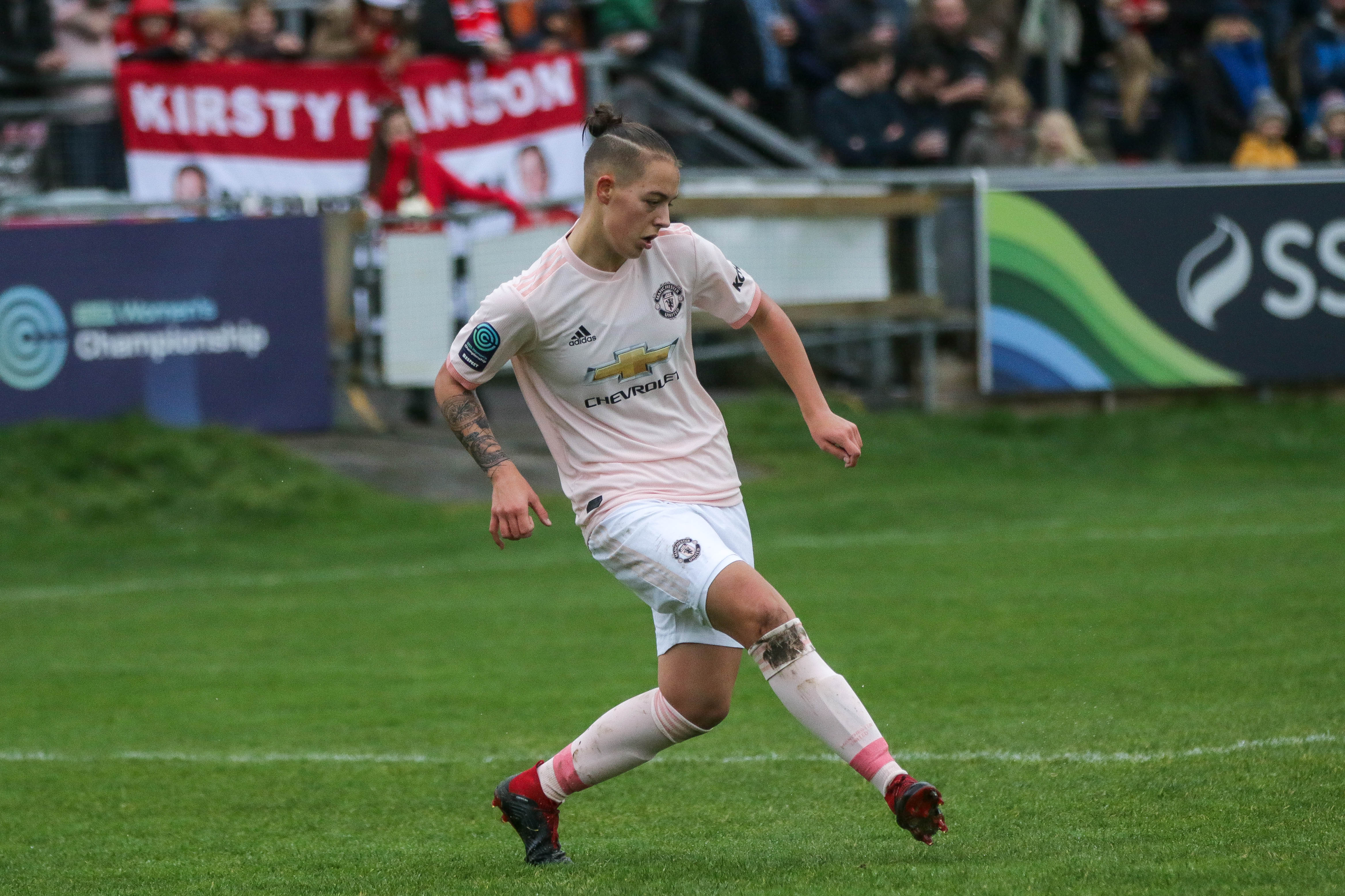
- Naomi Hartley playing for Manchester United in December 2018

Personal information
- Full name: Naomi Hartley
- Date of birth: 12 January 2001 (age 25)
- Place of birth: Burnley, England
- Position: Defender

Team information
- Current team: Burnley
- Number: 23

Youth career
- Burnley
- –2014: Blackburn Rovers
- 2014–2017: Manchester United
- 2017–2018: Liverpool

Senior career*
Years	Team	Apps	(Gls)
2018	Liverpool	1	(0)
2018–2019	Manchester United	3	(0)
2019	→ Sheffield United (loan)	7	(0)
2019–2021	Sheffield United	34	(2)
2021–2022	Coventry United	13	(0)
2022–2023	Sheffield United	9	(0)
2023–	Burnley	10	(1)

International career^{‡}
2017–2018	England U17	9	(0)
2019–	England U19	12	(0)
- * Club domestic league appearances and goals as of 18 August 2024 (UTC) ‡ National team caps and goals as of 00:00, 5 December 2022 (UTC)

Naomi Hartley (born 12 January 2001) is an English footballer who plays as a defender for Burnley. She previously played for Sheffield United, Manchester United, Coventry United, and spent time in the youth ranks of Burnley, Blackburn Rovers, Liverpool. She has been capped for England at youth level. She is openly lesbian and worked alongside the Community Foundation's Empower LGBT+ programme in 2022.

== Club career ==
=== Youth career ===
Hartley came through the youth ranks of hometown team Burnley and local rivals Blackburn before joining Manchester United's Centre of Excellence aged 13. After three years at the academy, but with no prospect of progression as United had no senior women's team at the time, Hartley joined Liverpool where she played with experienced England international Casey Stoney, who would later become Hartley's manager.

=== Liverpool ===
Hartley made her senior debut and only appearance for Liverpool on 18 February 2018, in a Women's FA Cup fifth round tie against Chichester City.

=== Manchester United ===
In 2018, Hartley was one of seven former Manchester United W.F.C. players to rejoin the club for their inaugural season in the FA Women's Championship. She was also one of nine players to have played alongside Casey Stoney, who was set to undertake her first managerial role as Manchester United W.F.C.'s head coach.

On 23 September, Hartley made her debut for the club when appearing as a 75th-minute substitute in a league game against London Bees. She made her first start away to Lewes on 2 December. On 8 March, she was loaned to fellow Championship side Sheffield United until the end of the season. She was released at the end of the season.

=== Sheffield United ===
Following an initial loan spell, Hartley signed for Sheffield United permanently ahead of the 2019–20 season. She made her debut in their opening game on 18 August 2019, playing the full 90 minutes in a 3–2 away loss against Aston Villa.

== International career ==
Hartley captained the England Under-17's during 2018 UEFA Women's Under-17 Championship qualification. In May 2018 she travelled to Lithuania as part of the squad to compete in the finals as the team reached the semi-finals. In February 2019, she was called up to the England Under-19's to take part in the La Manga tournament.

== Career statistics ==
=== Club ===
As of match played 29 August 2021

Appearances and goals by club, season and competition
Club	Season	League			FA Cup (Note: Includes the FA Women's Cup)		League Cup (Note: Includes the FA WSL Cup)		Total	
Club	Season	Division	Apps	Goals	Apps	Goals	Apps	Goals	Apps	Goals
Liverpool	2017–18	WSL 1	0	0	1	0	0	0	1	0
Manchester United	2018–19	Championship	3	0	0	0	0	0	3	0
Sheffield United (loan)	2018–19	Championship	7	0	0	0	0	0	7	0
Sheffield United	2019–20	Championship	14	0	0	0	6	0	20	0
Sheffield United	2020–21	Championship	20	0	0	0	3	0	23	0
Coventry United	2021–22	Championship	1	0	0	0	0	0	1	0
Career total			45	0	1	0	9	0	55	0
