= Aurora Mikalsen =

Norwegian footballer (born 1996)

Personal information
- Full name: Aurora Watten Mikalsen
- Date of birth: 21 March 1996 (age 30)
- Place of birth: Kristiansund, Norway
- Height: 1.75 m (5 ft 9 in)
- Position: Goalkeeper

Team information
- Current team: Kolbotn IL

Youth career
- –2011: Clausenengen
- 2012–2014: Arna-Bjørnar
- 2015: Clausenengen

Senior career*
Years	Team	Apps	(Gls)
2013–2014	Arna-Bjørnar	1	(0)
2013–2014	→ Arna-Bjørnar 2 (loan)	18	(0)
2015	Clausenengen	6	(0)
2016–2019	Kolbotn IL	64	(0)
2019–2020	Manchester United	0	(0)
2020–2021	Tottenham Hotspur	5	(0)
2021–2024	Brann	55	(0)
2025–2026	1. FC Köln	8	(0)
2026–	Kolbotn IL	0	(0)

International career^{‡}
2011	Norway U15	2	(0)
2012	Norway U16	3	(0)
2012–2013	Norway U17	8	(0)
2014–2015	Norway U19	16	(0)
2016–2019	Norway U23	16	(0)
2022–	Norway	19	(0)
- * Club domestic league appearances and goals as of 5 July 2026 ‡ National team caps and goals as of 6 December 2023

Aurora Watten Mikalsen (born 21 March 1996) is a Norwegian professional footballer who plays as a goalkeeper for Norwegian First Division club Kolbotn IL. She has represented the Norway national team at multiple youth levels and received her first senior call-up in February 2018.

She previously played in England with FA Women's Super League clubs Manchester United and Tottenham Hotspur.

== Club career ==
=== Norway ===
Having started her youth career with her hometown team Clausenengen, Mikalsen moved to Arna-Bjørnar in August 2012. On 2 November 2013, Mikalsen made her senior debut, starting for Arna-Bjørnar in a 2–1 Toppserien defeat to Vålerenga.

In 2015, Mikalsen returned to Clausenengen. She split playing time between the under-19s and senior 2. divisjon team. Mikalsen was also a regular starter for Clausenengen FK boys U19, which won the regional championship in the 2015 season.

On 16 December 2015, Mikalsen signed with Kolbotn ahead of the 2016 Toppserien season. On 28 March 2016, Mikalsen made her debut for the team in a 1–1 draw with LSK Kvinner.

=== Manchester United ===
In July 2019, Mikalsen trained with FA WSL club Manchester United while the team was on tour in Oslo. On 6 September 2019, Manchester United made the permanent signing of Mikalsen, in need of a backup after injuries to Emily Ramsey and Fran Bentley coupled with the pregnancy of Siobhan Chamberlain left the team with only Mary Earps to start the season. She made her debut on 21 November 2019, starting in an 11–1 League Cup Group Stage victory over Championship team Leicester City. She left at the end of the season following the expiration of her contract having made one appearance.

=== Tottenham Hotspur ===
On 27 July 2020, it was announced Mikalsen had signed a one-year contract with WSL team Tottenham Hotspur. With Spurs in good form having won their last three matches and only conceded twice, Mikalsen was forced into a debut on 31 January 2021 with regular starter Rebecca Spencer injured. She started in a 4–0 loss Chelsesa. Mikalsen remained starter for the duration of Spencer's injury absence, playing a total of five games, all in the WSL. Spurs lost 1–0 to Aston Villa, 3–2 to Everton, and 2–0 to Brighton & Hove Albion before Mikalsen earned her first and only clean sheet for Spurs as part of a goalless draw with Reading. She left at the end of the season upon the expiry of her contract.

=== Sandviken ===
On 28 July 2021, Mikalsen returned to Norway to sign with Toppserien side Sandviken.

=== 1.FC Köln ===
On 15 January 2025, it was announced that Mikalsen had signed for Frauen-Bundesliga club 1. FC Köln until June 2026.

=== Kolbotn IL ===
On 12 September 2026, Aurora Mikalsen returned to Kolbotn IL.

== International career ==
Mikalsen has represented the Norway national team at under-15, under-16, under-17, under-19 and under-23 level.

In 2018, Mikalsen received her first senior call-up as part of the 2018 Algarve Cup squad. A year later, Mikalsen was part of the senior squad that won the 2019 Algarve Cup. She made her debut in the 2022 Algarve Cup against Portugal. In the same year, she was selected for the Norwegian squad for the European Championship in England 2022.

On 19 June 2023, she was included in the 23-player Norwegian squad for the FIFA Women's World Cup 2023.

On 16 June 2025, Mikalsen was called up to the Norway squad for the UEFA Women's Euro 2025.

== Career statistics ==
=== Club ===
As of 28 July 2021

Appearances and goals by club, season and competition
Club	Season	League			National Cup (Note: Includes the Norwegian Women's Cup and Women's FA Cup)		League Cup (Note: Includes the FA Women's League Cup)		Total	
Club	Season	Division	Apps	Goals	Apps	Goals	Apps	Goals	Apps	Goals
Arna-Bjørnar	2013	Toppserien	1	0	0	0	—		1	0
Arna-Bjørnar	2014	Toppserien	0	0	1	0	—		1	0
Arna-Bjørnar	Total		1	0	1	0	0	0	2	0
Arna-Bjørnar 2 (loan)	2013	2. divisjon	11	0	—		—		11	0
Arna-Bjørnar 2 (loan)	2014	2. divisjon	7	0	—		—		7	0
Arna-Bjørnar 2 (loan)	Total		18	0	0	0	0	0	18	0
Clausenengen	2015	2. divisjon	6	0	1	0	—		7	0
Kolbotn	2016	Toppserien	8	0	1	0	—		9	0
Kolbotn	2017	Toppserien	22	0	2	0	—		24	0
Kolbotn	2018	Toppserien	22	0	2	0	—		24	0
Kolbotn	2019	Toppserien	12	0	1	0	—		13	0
Kolbotn	Total		64	0	6	0	0	0	70	0
Manchester United	2019–20	FA WSL	0	0	0	0	1	0	1	0
Tottenham Hotspur	2020–21	FA WSL	5	0	0	0	0	0	5	0
Sandviken	2021	Toppserien	0	0	0	0	—		0	0
Career total			94	0	8	0	1	0	103	0

== Honours ==
=== International ===
- Algarve Cup: 2019
