= 2018–19 Manchester United W.F.C. season =

Manchester United Women
2018–19 season
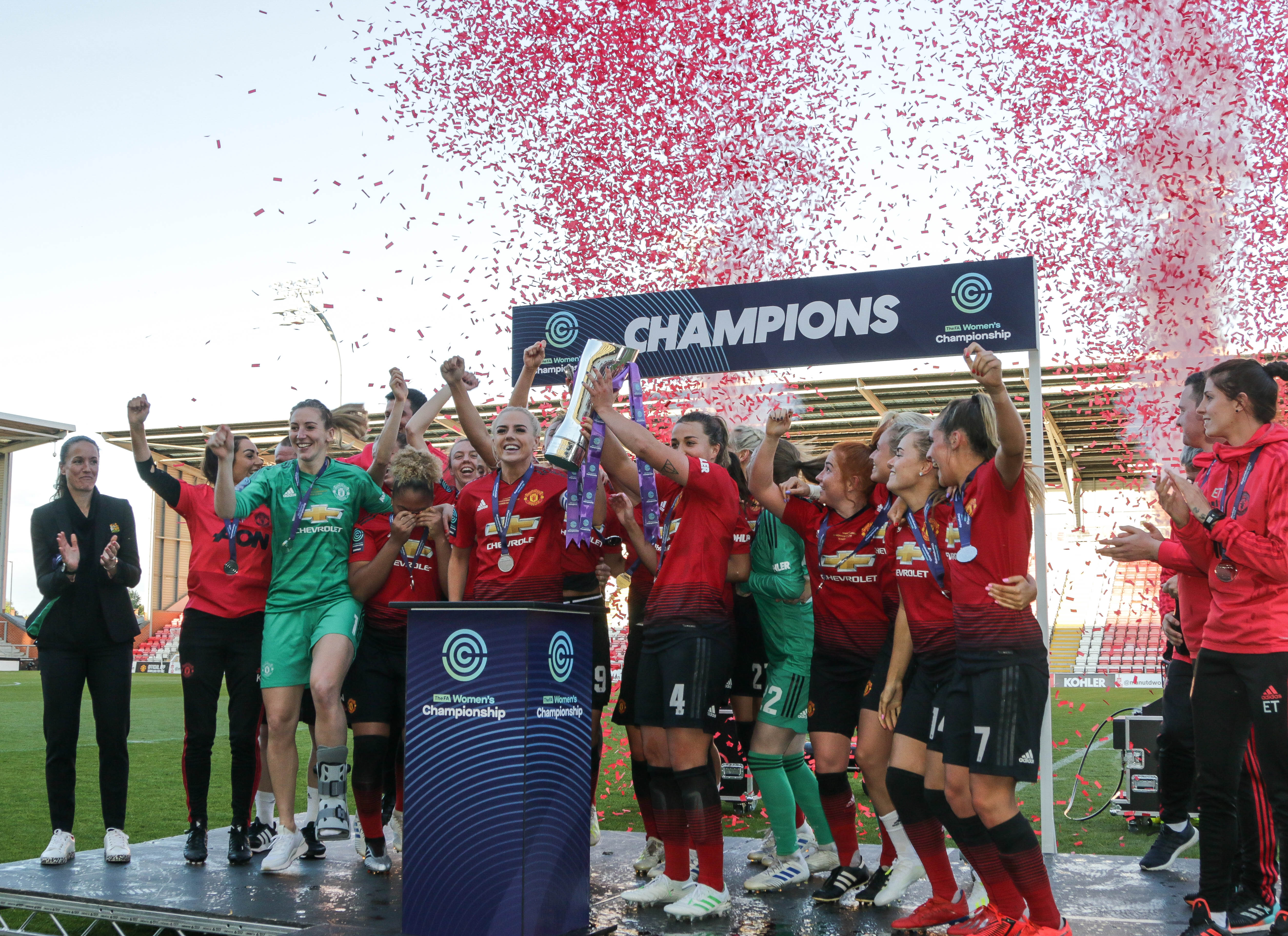
- Manchester United Women lifting the FA Women's Championship trophy
- Co-chairmen: Joel and Avram Glazer
- Manager: Casey Stoney
- Stadium: Leigh Sports Village
- Championship: 1st (promoted)
- FA Cup: Quarter-finals
- League Cup: Semi-finals
- Top goalscorer: League: Jessica Sigsworth (17 goals); All: Jessica Sigsworth (18 goals)
- Highest home attendance: 4,835 (vs. Reading, 25 August)
- Lowest home attendance: League: 1,401 (vs. Aston Villa, 17 April); All: 686 (vs. Durham, 5 December, League Cup)
- Average home league attendance: 2,180
Home colours	Away colours	Third colours

The 2018–19 season was Manchester United Women's inaugural season following the club's successful application to join the newly-formed FA Women's Championship after a league restructuring. The club also competed in the FA Cup and League Cup. The team played their home games at Leigh Sports Village, while the training ground at The Cliff undergoes redevelopment.

== Pre-season ==
In March 2018, Manchester United announced their intentions to enter a women's team into the second tier of the 2018–19 season. Their application was confirmed in May and they were announced as one of four new teams to enter the division alongside Charlton Athletic, Leicester City and Lewes F.C.

On 8 June 2018, former England international Casey Stoney was announced as head coach. The full 21-player squad was revealed in July and included the return of Katie Zelem, Emily Ramsey, Naomi Hartley, Fran Bentley, Millie Turner, Kirsty Hanson and Ella Toone who were all previously part of the club's Girls' Regional Talent Club and Centre of Excellence.

United's first game was a behind-closed-doors friendly against Liverpool on 15 July. The game had to be abandoned after goalkeeper Siobhan Chamberlain was taken to hospital with a suspected serious neck injury which was later confirmed not as serious as first thought.

== FA Women's Championship ==
=== Matches ===
On 1 August 2018, the FA Women's Championship announced the fixtures for the 2018–19 season. The team confirmed promotion to the FA WSL on 17 April 2019 after victory over Aston Villa with three games to spare. Three days later, they clinched the Championship title with a win at home to Crystal Palace.

Date	Opponents	H / A	Result F–A	Scorers	Attendance	League position
9 September 2018	Aston Villa	A	12–0	James (2) 10', 23', Sigsworth (5) 25', 33', 35', 49', 61' Zelem 28' (pen.), Hanson (2) 54', 59', Green 66', Toone 68'	1,165	1st
20 September 2018	Sheffield United	H	3–0	Zelem 12' (pen.), Hanson 40', Arnot 64'	2,003	1st
23 September 2018	London Bees	A	5–0	Green (2) 17', 55', James 27', M.Turner 44', Toone 78'	642	1st
30 September 2018	Durham	H	0–0		2,244	1st
14 October 2018	Charlton Athletic	H	3–0	Zelem 16', Sigsworth 64', Arnot 75'	2,349	1st
28 October 2018	Leicester City	A	Postponed following the Leicester City F.C. helicopter crash the previous day			
4 November 2018	Tottenham Hotspur	H	4–1	James 10', Sigsworth (2) 19', 41', Devlin 81'	2,367	2nd
18 November 2018	Crystal Palace	A	5–0	Arnot (2) 17', 55', Green (2) 59', 83', Greenwood 75' (pen.)	975	2nd
25 November 2018	Millwall Lionesses	H	8–0	James 16', Green (3) 32', 38', 49', Zelem 36', Toone 58', Sigsworth 71', Greenwood 79' (pen.)	N/A	1st
2 December 2018	Lewes	A	2–0	Green 48', Toone 81'	1,958	1st
9 December 2018	Durham	A	1–3	Toone 43'	912	1st
6 January 2019	London Bees	H	9–0	Devlin (2) 2', 56', Toone (2) 29', 66', Arnot 40', Green 42', James (2) 68', 72', Zelem 78'	1,889	1st
13 January 2019	Charlton Athletic	A	Match abandoned at 1–0 on medical grounds following injury to Kerr			
10 February 2019	Aston Villa	H	Rescheduled due to Aston Villa's FA Cup commitments			
13 February 2019	Leicester City	A	7–0	Toone (4) 15', 17', 66' (pen.), 88', Hanson 52', Greenwood 54', Johnston 85' (o.g.)	824	2nd
20 February 2019	Sheffield United	A	4–0	Zelem 1', James 27', Toone 41' (pen.), Green 51'	1,008	2nd
10 March 2019	Leicester City	H	6–1	Green 17', James 22', Hanson 44', Toone 48', Sigsworth (2) 67', 84'	1,554	2nd
24 March 2019	Charlton Athletic	A	2–1	Zelem 57' (pen.), Sigsworth 63'	732	1st
31 March 2019	Tottenham Hotspur	A	5–1	Zelem (2) 3', 10' (pen.) Green 46', Sigsworth 81', Galton 87'	1,607	1st
17 April 2019	Aston Villa	H	5–0	M. Turner 6', Greenwood 21' (pen.), Sigsworth 35', Toone 49', Devlin 73'	1,401	1st
20 April 2019	Crystal Palace	H	7–0	James (4) 9', 83', 85', 90', Arnot 33', Galton 35', Sigsworth 46'	2,112	1st
28 April 2019	Millwall Lionesses	A	5–0	Zelem 7' (pen.), A. Turner 12', Devlin 23', Harris 29' (pen.), Sigsworth 77'	1,920	1st
11 May 2019	Lewes	H	5–0	James 12', Sigsworth 34', Galton 68', Palmer 75', A. Turner 79'	3,702	1st

=== League table ===
Pos	Team	Pld	W	D	L	GF	GA	GD	Pts	Qualification
1	Manchester United (C, P)	20	18	1	1	98	7	+91	55	Promotion to the WSL (Note: Dependent on obtaining a licence.)
2	Tottenham Hotspur (P)	20	15	1	4	44	27	+17	46	Promotion to the WSL
3	Charlton Athletic	20	13	2	5	49	21	+28	41	
4	Durham	20	11	6	3	37	16	+21	39	
5	Sheffield United	20	11	1	8	35	31	+4	34	

Source: FA WSL
Rules for classification: 1) Points; 2) Goal difference; 3) Number of goals scored
(C) Champions; (P) Promoted

== Women's FA Cup ==
Manchester United entered the Women's FA Cup in the fourth round with the rest of the top two tiers and were drawn against WSL side Brighton & Hove Albion. Lauren James' brace earned United a 2–0 win to put them in the draw for the fifth round. They were drawn against fellow Championship side London Bees who United had already scored 14 goals against across their two league meetings. United progressed to the quarter-finals with a 3–0 win, held at back-up venue Ewen Fields, and were drawn against Reading to set up the second cup meeting between the two teams after Reading triumphed in the WSL Cup Group Stage earlier in the season. The WSL side triumphed for a second time, taking United to extra-time after a goalless 90 minutes before eventually winning 3–2 with Rakel Hönnudóttir's late winner coming in the 120+2 minute.

Date	Round	Opponents	H / A	Result F–A	Scorers	Attendance
3 February 2019	Round 4	Brighton & Hove Albion	A	2–0	James (2) 51', 90+2	764
17 February 2019	Round 5	London Bees	H	3–0	Toone 27', Green 33', Devlin 87'	838
17 March 2019	Quarter-final	Reading	A	2–3 (a.e.t.)	Greenwood 98' (pen.), Harding 107' (o.g.)	951

== FA Women's League Cup ==
=== Group stage ===
Manchester United were entered into Group Two North for the 2018–19 FA WSL Cup alongside WSL sides Liverpool, Everton and Reading and fellow Championship side Durham. They played two games at home and two away, winning three including both away ties to Merseyside teams.

Date	Opponents	H / A	Result F–A	Scorers	Attendance	Group position
19 August 2018	Liverpool	A	1–0	Arnot 83'	829	2nd
25 August 2018	Reading	H	0–2		4,835	2nd
5 December 2018	Durham	H	1–0	Green 1'	686	2nd
13 December 2018	Everton	A	3–0	James 12', Galton 17', Zelem 37'	240	1st

Pos	Team	Pld	W	WPEN	LPEN	L	GF	GA	GD	Pts	Qualification	MNU	REA	EVE	DUR	LIV
1	Manchester United	4	3	0	0	1	5	2	+3	9	Advance to knock-out stage	—	0–2	—	1–0	—
2	Reading	4	2	0	1	1	9	5	+4	7	Advance to knock-out stage	—	—	—	4–1	1–1
3	Everton	4	2	0	0	2	6	7	−1	6		0–3	3–2	—	—	—
4	Durham	4	1	0	1	2	5	8	−3	4		—	—	1–0	—	3–3
5	Liverpool	4	0	2	0	2	5	8	−3	4		0–1	—	1–3	—	—

Source: thefa.com
Rules for classification: 1) Points; 2) Goal difference; 3) Number of goals scored

=== Knockout phase ===
The draw for the quarter-final was made on 18 December, with Manchester United the only team from outside of the FA WSL to qualify from the group stage. They were drawn against West Ham United who had finished second in Group Two South behind defending champions Arsenal. After beating West Ham 2–0, United progressed to the semi-finals and were drawn against Arsenal. The tie was televised nationally on BT Sport as Arsenal won 2–1 to progress to their seventh final in eight years.

Date	Round	Opponents	H / A	Result F–A	Scorers	Attendance
9 January 2019	Quarter-final	West Ham United	H	2–0	Longhurst 17' (o.g.), Sigsworth 53'	1,029
7 February 2019	Semi-final	Arsenal	A	1–2	Green 83'	1,836

== Squad statistics ==
Numbers in brackets denote appearances as substitute.
Key to positions: GK – Goalkeeper; DF – Defender; MF – Midfielder; FW – Forward

No.	Pos.	Name	Championship		FA Cup		League Cup		Total		Discipline	
No.	Pos.	Name	Apps	Goals	Apps	Goals	Apps	Goals	Apps	Goals	Yellow card	Red card
1	GK	(England) Siobhan Chamberlain	18	0	3	0	6	0	27	0	0	0
2	DF	(England) Martha Harris	12 (3)	1	3	0	4	0	19 (3)	1	1	0
3	DF	(England) Alex Greenwood (c)	17 (1)	4	3	1	6	0	26 (1)	5	1	0
4	DF	(England) Amy Turner	16	2	2	0	6	0	24	2	3	0
6	MF	(England) Aimee Palmer	6 (7)	1	1	0	0 (1)	0	7 (8)	1	0	0
7	FW	(England) Ella Toone	16 (4)	14	3	1	0 (6)	0	19 (10)	15	3	0
8	MF	(England) Mollie Green	14 (4)	13	3	1	6	2	23 (4)	16	1	0
9	FW	(England) Jessica Sigsworth	15 (4)	17	3	0	6	1	24 (4)	18	3	0
10	MF	(England) Katie Zelem	18	10	2	0	6	1	26	11	2	0
11	FW	(England) Leah Galton	10 (4)	3	1 (1)	0	3 (2)	1	14 (7)	4	1	0
12	DF	(England) Naomi Hartley	1 (2)	0	0	0	0	0	1 (2)	0	0	0
13	GK	(England) Emily Ramsey	2	0	0 (1)	0	0	0	2 (1)	0	0	0
14	MF	(England) Charlie Devlin	6 (10)	5	2	1	0 (2)	0	8 (12)	6	1	0
15	DF	(England) Lucy Roberts	0	0	0	0	0	0	0	0	0	0
16	MF	(England) Lauren James	12 (6)	14	0 (3)	2	6	1	18 (9)	17	4	0
17	FW	(Scotland) Lizzie Arnot	12 (5)	6	1 (1)	0	3 (2)	1	16 (8)	7	0	0
18	FW	(Scotland) Kirsty Hanson	12 (5)	5	2 (1)	0	3 (3)	0	17 (9)	5	0	0
19	FW	(England) Ebony Salmon	0	0	0	0	0	0	0	0	0	0
20	DF	(Scotland) Kirsty Smith	13 (3)	0	1 (1)	0	5	0	19 (4)	0	0	0
21	DF	(England) Millie Turner	20	2	3	0	6	0	29	2	1	0
22	GK	(England) Fran Bentley	0 (1)	0	0	0	0	0	0 (1)	0	0	0
—	—	Own goals	—	1	—	1	—	1	—	3	—	—

== Transfers ==
=== In ===
Date	Pos.	Name	From	Ref.
13 July 2018	GK	(England) Siobhan Chamberlain	(England) Liverpool	
13 July 2018	GK	(England) Emily Ramsey	(England) Liverpool	
13 July 2018	GK	(England) Fran Bentley	(England) Manchester City	
13 July 2018	DF	(England) Martha Harris	(England) Liverpool	
13 July 2018	DF	(England) Alex Greenwood	(England) Liverpool	
13 July 2018	DF	(England) Amy Turner	(England) Liverpool	
13 July 2018	DF	(England) Millie Turner	(England) Bristol City	
13 July 2018	DF	(England) Naomi Hartley	(England) Liverpool	
13 July 2018	DF	(England) Lucy Roberts	(England) Liverpool	
13 July 2018	DF	(Scotland) Kirsty Smith	(Scotland) Hibernian	
13 July 2018	MF	(England) Aimee Palmer	(England) Bristol City	
13 July 2018	MF	(England) Mollie Green	(England) Everton	
13 July 2018	MF	(England) Katie Zelem	(Italy) Juventus	
13 July 2018	MF	(England) Charlie Devlin	(England) Millwall Lionesses	
13 July 2018	MF	(England) Lauren James	(England) Arsenal	
13 July 2018	FW	(Scotland) Lizzie Arnot	(Scotland) Hibernian	
13 July 2018	FW	(England) Ella Toone	(England) Manchester City	
13 July 2018	FW	(England) Jessica Sigsworth	(England) Doncaster Rovers Belles	
13 July 2018	FW	(England) Ebony Salmon	(England) Aston Villa	
13 July 2018	FW	(England) Leah Galton	(Germany) Bayern Munich	
13 July 2018	FW	(Scotland) Kirsty Hanson	(England) Doncaster Rovers Belles	

=== Loans out ===
Date from	Date to	Pos.	Name	To	Ref.
4 January 2019	End of season	FW	(England) Ebony Salmon	(England) Sheffield United	
8 February 2019	End of season	GK	(England) Fran Bentley	(England) Sheffield United	
8 March 2019	End of season	DF	(England) Naomi Hartley	(England) Sheffield United	
