= Gemma Davies =

English football manager (born 1991)

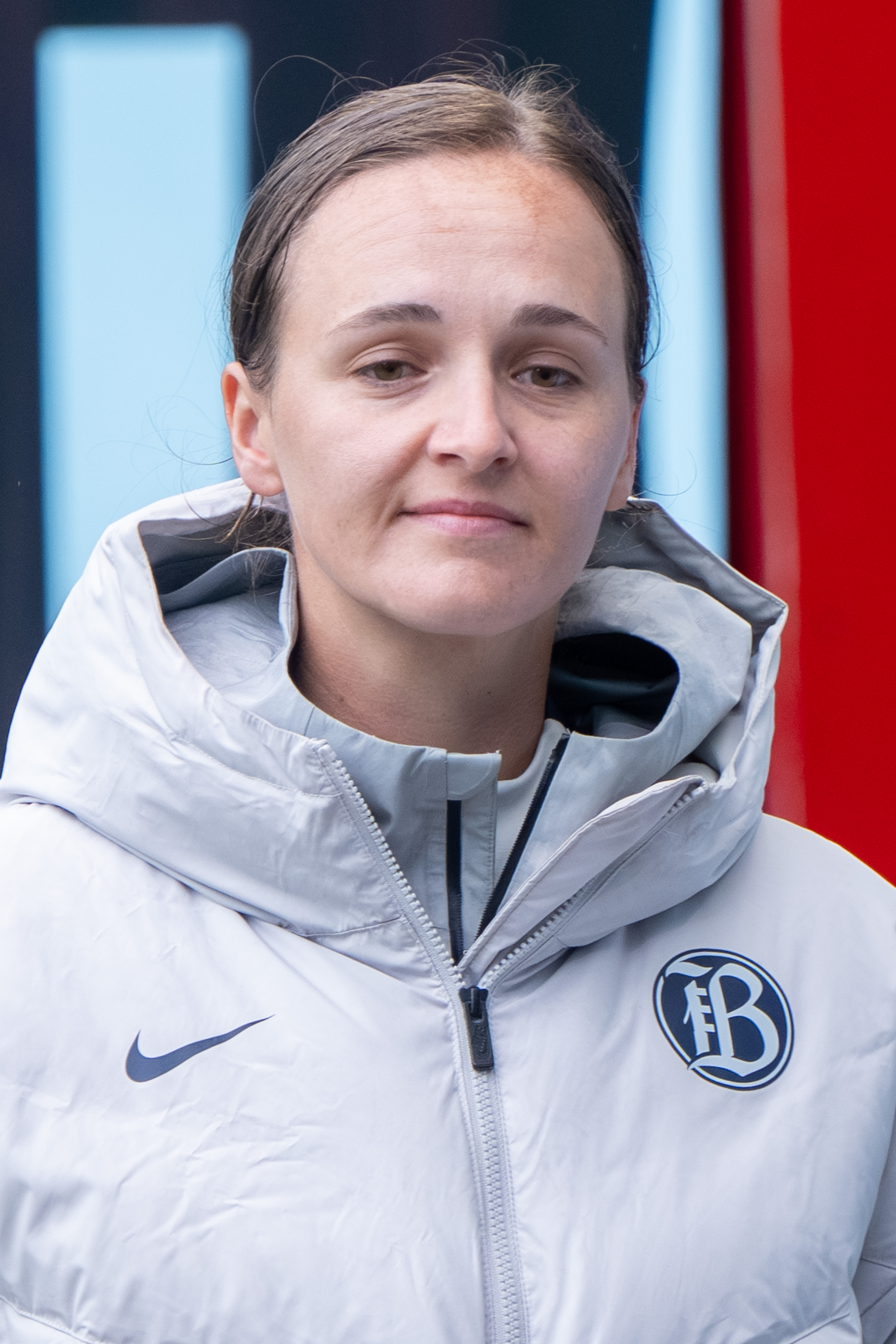
- Davies with Bay FC in 2026

Personal information
- Date of birth: 1 July 1991 (age 35)
- Place of birth: Kingstanding, Birmingham, England

Team information
- Current team: Bay FC (assistant)

Managerial career
- Years: Team
- 2018–2021: Aston Villa
- 2021–2022: England U19
- 2023–2025: England U23 (assistant)
- 2026–: Bay FC (assistant)

Gemma Davies (born 1 July 1991) is an English football manager who is an assistant coach for Bay FC of the National Women's Soccer League (NWSL). She has previously managed Women's Super League club Aston Villa.

== Early life ==
Davies began coaching aged 15 for Erdington Ladies under-10 and under-12 youth teams, where her sister played. She later gained a Master of Arts in Sports Science from Loughborough University.

== Managerial career ==
=== Aston Villa ===
After working towards her UEFA A License and acting as assistant head coach for Birmingham City Women in the 2017–18 WSL 2 season, Davies was appointed head of Aston Villa Women in June 2018, while continuing in her role as Head of Women’s Football at the University of Birmingham.

In the 2019–20 Women's Championship, after gaining two wins from the opening games, Davies was awarded the Manager of the Month award for August 2019. League Managers' Association chair Marieanne Spacey-Cale commented this was due to "the work Gemma and her team has done over the summer, bringing in new signings and technical work on the training pitch...". After the season was ended prematurely due to the COVID-19 pandemic, Davies led Aston Villa in an unbeaten run to promotion to the Women's Super League (WSL), with a record 13 wins and 1 draw. In doing so, she became the youngest head coach in the WSL, and was subsequently awarded the Women's Championship Manager of the Season award.

In May 2021, Davies was sacked as Villa manager in a shock decision, while in competition for the role with then interim manager Marcus Bignot. They were both replaced soon after by former Birmingham City Women manager Carla Ward.

=== England youth teams ===
In October 2021, Davies became the head coach for the England women's under-19 team, beginning with 2022 U19 Championship qualification. In April 2022 she led the team to successful qualification for the final tournament, where they exited in the group stage of the tournament.

In the summer of 2023, Davies joined former footballers Remi Allen and Anita Asante as assistant coaches of the England women's under-23 team.

=== Bay FC ===
On 4 December 2025, Davies moved alongside England under-23 head coach to Emma Coates to the United States, forming the new coaching regime of National Women's Soccer League club Bay FC. She will begin as an assistant to Coates in 2026, Bay FC's third season of play.

== Managerial honours ==
Aston Villa Women

- Women's Championship: 2019–20

Individual

- Women's Championship Manager of the Month: August 2019, December 2019
- Women's Championship Manager of the Season: 2019–20
