= 2019–20 FA Women's Championship =

FA Women's Championship
- Season: 2019–20
- Champions: Aston Villa
- Matches: 74
- Goals: 247 (3.34 per match)
- Top goalscorer: 15 goals Katie Wilkinson, Sheffield United
- Biggest home win: Sheffield United 7–1 Leicester City (25 August 2019)
- Biggest away win: Crystal Palace 0–6 Aston Villa (15 September 2019); London City Lionesses 0–6 Durham (29 September 2019)
- Highest scoring: Sheffield United 7–1 Leicester City (25 August 2019)

The 2019–20 FA Women's Championship was the second season of the rebranded FA Women's Championship, the second tier of women's football in England. It was renamed from the FA WSL 2 which was founded in 2014. The season began on 18 August 2019.

On 13 March 2020, in line with the FA's response to the coronavirus pandemic, it was announced the season was temporarily suspended until at least 3 April 2020. Following further postponements, the season was ultimately ended prematurely on 25 May 2020 with immediate effect.

On 5 June 2020, Aston Villa, who sat six points clear and had gone unbeaten in the season so far, were awarded the league title and promoted to the WSL on sporting merit after The FA Board's decision to award places on a points-per-game basis. Despite finishing last, Charlton Athletic were spared relegation after the seasons from tier three and below were null and voided and results had been expunged.

== Teams ==
Location of clubs for the 2018–19 season

Twelve teams were originally scheduled to compete in the Championship for the 2019–20 season, an increase of one team from the previous season. This was a planned progression of the restructuring of the English women's game, a move prompted to provide for a fully professional Women's Super League (WSL) starting with the 2018–19 season. Membership of both the first and second tier is subject to a license, based on a series of off-the-field criteria.

However, at the end of the 2018–19 Championship the top two teams, Manchester United and Tottenham Hotspur, gained promotion to the WSL. They were scheduled to be replaced by Yeovil Town, who were relegated from the WSL after finishing 11th in the 2018–19 season but the team was denied a license in May 2019 and instead granted third tier status. The two promoted teams were Blackburn Rovers, the winners of the 2018–19 FA Women's National League Northern Division, and Coventry United, the winners of Southern Division. As a result, the competition shall run with only 11 teams for the second consecutive season.

No teams were relegated from the Championship following 2018–19 season to facilitate the expansion from 11 to 12 teams. However, because 11 teams only contested the 2019–20 season, the winners of the National League North and South divisions will both once again be promoted while one Championship team will be relegated.

On 13 May 2019, a Millwall FC statement announced the Lionesses team was no longer affiliating itself with the men's team, instead forming an independent and fully professional breakaway team called London City Lionesses for the start of the 2019–20 season with the aim of transferring the operating license of the old Lionesses team. Millwall also announced their intention to retain its own women's team with the support of the Community Trust, eventually contesting the season in the fifth tier Eastern Region Women's Football League.

Team	Location	Ground	Capacity	2018–19 season
Aston Villa	Boldmere	Trevor Brown Memorial Ground	2,500	6th
Blackburn Rovers	Bamber Bridge	Irongate	3,000	WNL North, 1st
Charlton Athletic	Bexley	The Oakwood	1,180	3rd
Coventry United	Coventry	Butts Park Arena	4,000	WNL South, 1st
Crystal Palace	Bromley	Hayes Lane	5,000	10th
Durham	Durham	New Ferens Park	3,000	4th
Leicester City	Quorn	Farley Way Stadium	1,400	7th
Lewes	Lewes	The Dripping Pan	3,000	9th
London Bees	Canons Park	The Hive Stadium	5,176	8th
London City Lionesses	Dartford	Princes Park	4,100	N/A
Sheffield United	Chesterfield	Proact Stadium (Note: Opening three home games played at Sheffield Olympic Legacy Park)	10,504	5th

=== Managerial changes ===
Team	Outgoing manager	Manner of departure	Date of vacancy	Position in table	Incoming manager	Date of appointment
London Bees	(England) Rachel Yankey	Resigned	13 May 2019	Pre-season	(England) Lee Burch	9 July 2019
London City Lionesses	(England) Chris Phillips	Sacked	15 October 2019	4th	(England) John Bayer (interim)	15 October 2019
Lewes	(Spain) Fran Alonso	Signed by Celtic	14 January 2020	8th	(England) Simon Parker	14 January 2020
Coventry United	(England) Stuart Wilson	Sacked	20 February 2020	9th	(England) Jay Bradford	20 February 2020

== Table ==
In a change from the previous season, there was a one up one down system between the WSL and Championship meaning only the first placed team would be automatically promoted subject to obtaining a licence instead of two, with one WSL team relegated to take their place. Still with a view to expanding the top two tiers to twelve teams each by the start of the 2020–21 season, one Championship team would have been relegated and replaced by the winners of both the National League North and South divisions regardless of the result of the Championship play-off but again subject to obtaining a licence. However, while the movement between the WSL and Championship was honoured, there was no relegation or promotion between the Championship and National League after the seasons from tier three and below were null and voided and results had been expunged.

Pos	Team	Pld	W	D	L	GF	GA	GD	Pts	PPG	Qualification
1	Aston Villa (C, P)	14	13	1	0	39	11	+28	40	2.86	Promotion to the WSL (Note: Dependent on obtaining a licence.)
2	Sheffield United	14	11	1	2	46	16	+30	34	2.43	
3	Durham	14	10	2	2	33	10	+23	32	2.29	
4	London City Lionesses	15	8	2	5	25	24	+1	26	1.73	
5	London Bees	12	4	3	5	16	19	−3	15	1.25	
6	Leicester City	15	4	3	8	22	35	−13	15	1.00	
7	Blackburn Rovers	12	3	1	8	13	25	−12	10	0.83	
8	Lewes	12	2	3	7	10	18	−8	9	0.75	
9	Crystal Palace	14	2	4	8	15	33	−18	10	0.71	
10	Coventry United	14	2	3	9	19	35	−16	9	0.64	
11	Charlton Athletic	12	0	7	5	9	21	−12	7	0.58	

Rules for classification: 1) Points; 2) Goal difference; 3) Number of goals scored
(C) Champions; (P) Promoted

== Results ==
Home \ Away	AST	BLB	CHA	COV	CRY	DUR	LCW	LEW	LON	LCL	SHU
Aston Villa	—	2–1	3–0	4–0	–	1–1	3–1	1–0	–	3–1	3–2
Blackburn Rovers	–	—	–	2–2	2–0	0–2	1–2	–	0–1	–	2–3
Charlton Athletic	0–4	1–2	—	1–1	–	–	1–1	0–0	–	0–2	–
Coventry United	2–3	–	–	—	3–2	2–3	–	1–2	–	1–2	0–5
Crystal Palace	0–6	–	1–1	0–0	—	1–4	1–3	–	–	1–2	1–5
Durham	–	0–1	2–0	–	2–1	—	1–0	3–0	3–1	1–1	–
Leicester City	–	2–0	2–2	1–3	1–2	1–5	—	1–0	3–3	–	1–4
Lewes	–	5–1	–	–	1–1	–	0–3	—	0–0	–	1–2
London Bees	1–2	–	1–1	2–1	2–3	–	–	2–1	—	0–2	–
London City Lionesses	2–3	–	–	3–2	1–1	0–6	3–1	3–0	0–2	—	1–2
Sheffield United	0–1	5–1	2–2	5–1	–	1–0	7–1	–	3–1	–	—

Source: FA WSL
Legend: Blue = home team win; Yellow = draw; Red = away team win.

== Top goalscorers ==
As of 23 February 2020

Rank	Player	Team	Goals
1	(England) Katie Wilkinson	Sheffield United	15
2	(Jamaica) Melissa Johnson	Aston Villa	12
3	(England) Jade Pennock	Sheffield United	10
4	(Jamaica) Shania Hayles	Aston Villa	8
5	(England) Olivia Fergusson	Sheffield United	7
5	(England) Beth Hepple	Durham	7
5	(England) Molly Sharpe	Durham	7
8	(England) Natasha Flint	Blackburn Rovers	6
8	(England) Emma Follis	Aston Villa	6
10	(Jamaica) Paige Bailey-Gayle	Leicester City	5
10	(England) Ashleigh Goddard	Crystal Palace	5
10	(England) Amber Hughes	Coventry United	5
10	(England) Shannon O'Brien	Coventry United	5
10	(England) Aimee Palmer	Sheffield United	5
10	(England) Lauren Pickett	London Bees	5
10	(Scotland) Lisa Robertson	Durham	5

== Awards ==
=== Monthly awards ===
Results of Manager of the Month as awarded by the League Managers Association. Number of awards in brackets. Results of Player of the Month voting as polled by FA Women's Championship. Number of nominations in brackets.

Month	Manager of the Month		Player of the Month		Ref.
Month	Manager	Club	Player	Club	Ref.
August	(England) Gemma Davies	Aston Villa	(England) Melissa Johnson	Aston Villa	
September	(England) Lee Burch	London Bees	(England) Molly Sharpe	Durham	
October	(England) John Bayer	London City Lionesses	(England) Jade Pennock	Sheffield United	
November	(England) Carla Ward	Sheffield United	(England) Amber Hughes	Coventry United	
December	(England) Gemma Davies (2)	Aston Villa	(England) Katie Wilkinson (3)	Sheffield United	
January	(England) Lee Burch (2)	London Bees	(Scotland) Sarah Quantrill	London Bees	
February			(England) Paige Bailey-Gayle	Leicester City	

=== Annual awards ===
The end of season awards were announced on 27 July 2020.

Award	Winner	Club
Golden boot	(England) Katie Wilkinson	Sheffield United
Golden glove	(England) Sian Rogers	Aston Villa
Player of the season	(England) Katie Wilkinson	Sheffield United
Manager of the season	(England) Gemma Davies	Aston Villa

== See also ==
- 2019–20 FA Women's League Cup
- 2019–20 FA WSL (tier 1)
- 2019–20 FA Women's National League (tier 3 & 4)
