= Jessica Sigsworth =

English footballer (born 1994)

Jess Sigsworth
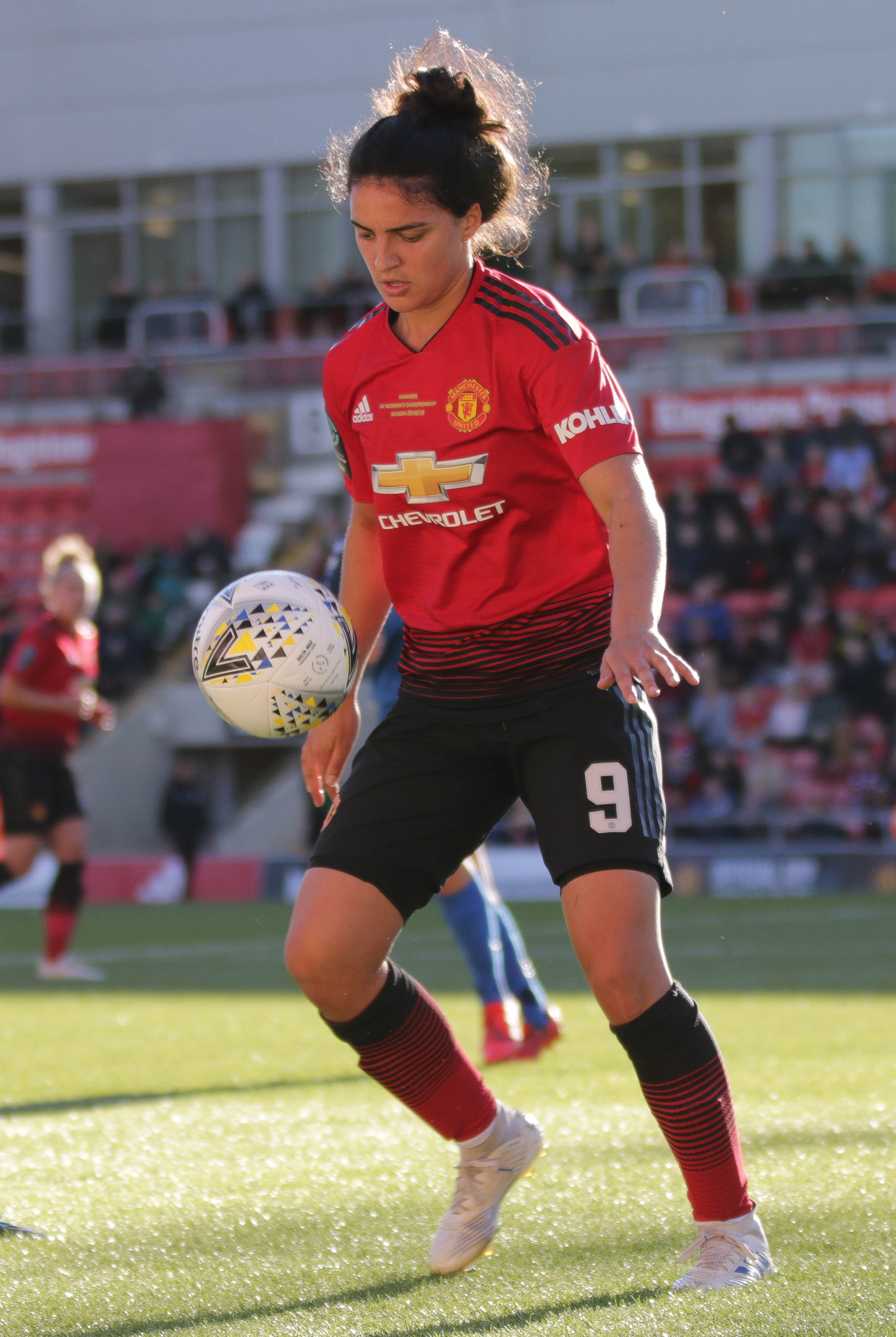
- Sigsworth playing for Manchester United, February 2019

Personal information
- Full name: Jessica Lucy Sigsworth
- Date of birth: 13 October 1994 (age 32)
- Place of birth: Doncaster, England
- Height: 5 ft 8 in (1.72 m)
- Position: Forward

Youth career
- Branton Boys
- Doncaster Rovers Belles
- 2008–2011: Sheffield United Academy

Senior career*
Years	Team	Apps	(Gls)
2011–2015	Doncaster Rovers Belles	44	(7)
2015	Notts County	0	(0)
2016–2018	Doncaster Rovers Belles	25	(17)
2018–2021	Manchester United	47	(22)
2021–2023	Leicester City	13	(2)
2023–2024	Sheffield United	16	(1)
Total		145	(49)

International career^{‡}
2011	England U17	3	(1)
2011–2013	England U19	18	(3)
2014	England U20	3	(0)
	England U23	5	
- * Club domestic league appearances and goals as of 31 July 2024 (UTC) ‡ National team caps and goals as of 4 June 2016

Jessica Lucy Sigsworth (born 13 October 1994) is an English former professional footballer who played as a striker for Manchester United, Sheffield United, Notts County, Doncaster Rovers Belles and Leicester City, and has represented England at numerous youth levels.

Sigsworth won the Golden Boot award for most goals scored during the 2017–18 FA WSL 2 season and the 2018–19 FA Women's Championship.

== Early life ==
Sigsworth, aged seven, started her youth career playing for Branton Boys. Her twin brother played for Branton and the coach asked her if she wanted to play. After playing for Doncaster Rovers Belles Juniors, she moved to Sheffield United Girls’ Centre of Excellence, where she broke into the England under-17 squad. After three seasons, she returned to Doncaster Belles.

As a youth, Sigsworth was a fan of Manchester United and dreamed of playing for the club.

== Club career ==
=== Doncaster Rovers Belles, 2011–15 ===
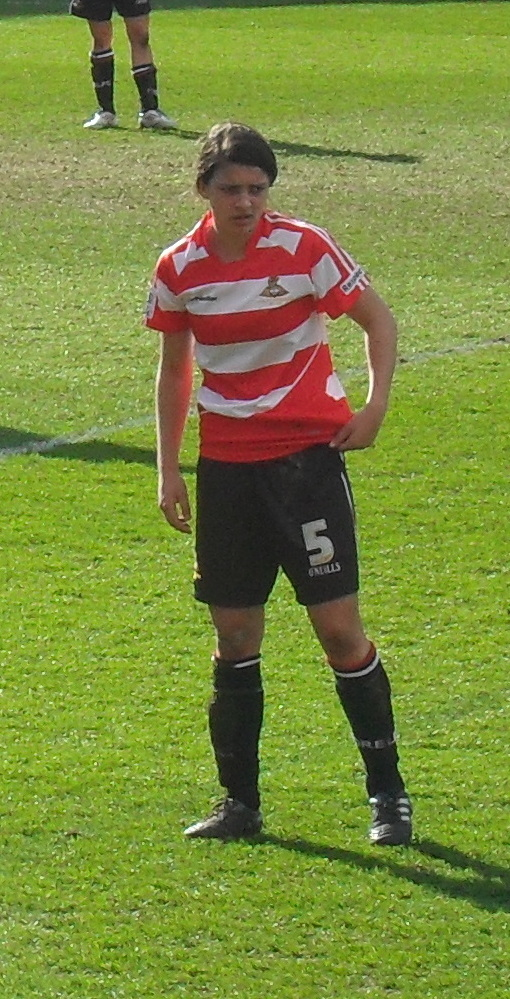
Sigsworth playing for Doncaster Rovers Belles in 2011.

Sigsworth began her senior career by signing with Doncaster Rovers Belles in 2011. She made her senior debut on 23 July 2011 in a 3–0 defeat against Birmingham City. In four years, she scored seven goals in 41 appearances.

=== Notts County, 2015 ===
In January 2015, Sigsworth moved to FA WSL outfit Notts County. Though she was named in a matchday squad twice, she never made an appearance.

=== Return to Doncaster Rovers Belles, 2016–18 ===
In November 2015, Sigsworth re-signed with hometown team Doncaster Rovers Belles ahead of the 2016 season. On 20 March 2016, she scored her first goal, in her first appearance since returning to the club in a 4–1 defeat against Chelsea in the FA Women's Cup. In May 2016, she signed a full-time contract. In August, she suffered a cruciate knee ligament injury, missing the rest of the season, as the team were relegated to FA WSL 2, as well as the subsequent Spring Series. In the 2017–18 season, Sigsworth won the FA WSL 2 Player of the Month award for March. Sigsworth guided Doncaster to the FA WSL 2 title and won the golden boot with 15 goals.

=== Manchester United, 2018–21 ===
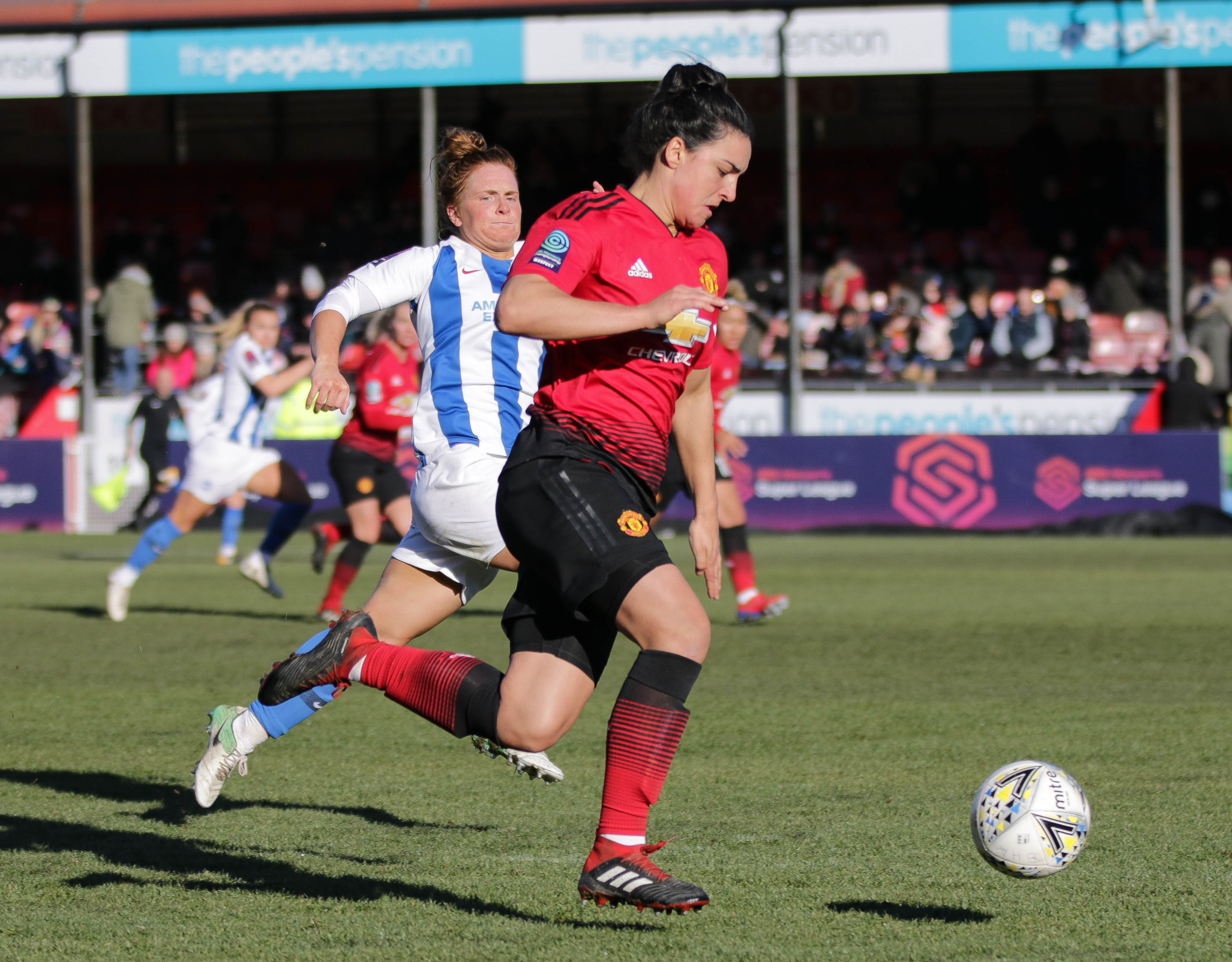
Sigsworth playing for Manchester United against Brighton & Hove Albion in 2019.

In July 2018, Sigsworth was announced as part of the inaugural Manchester United squad that was set to compete in the newly restructured FA Women's Championship. She made her competitive debut for Manchester United in a 1–0 League Cup victory against Liverpool on 19 August. On the opening day of the 2018–19 Championship season, Sigsworth scored five goals in a 12–0 win away to Aston Villa. On 9 March 2019, during a 2–0 FA WSL Cup win against West Ham, Sigsworth was involved in an incident with Brooke Hendrix; three days later, Hendrix was charged with violent conduct by the FA and banned for three games. Sigsworth finished the season with consecutive Championship titles and golden boot awards, having scored 17 league goals.

Sigsworth scored her first goal of the 2019–20 season in United's 2–0 League Cup win against Manchester City on 20 October 2019. During a match against Reading on 27 October, her "cool, calm and collected" goal in the 85th minute secured the team's 2–0 win. She finished the regular season with two goals in 14 matches. Manchester United finished in fourth place with a 7–5–2 record.

Ahead of the 2020–21 season, Sigsworth signed a new one-year contract with an option for a further year. Of the signing, she said, "I love this club; as a kid growing up supporting United it was always a dream to be a part of its history." With a decrease in playing time for a second successive season, limited to 577 minutes in 14 league appearances, it was announced on 21 June 2021 that Sigsworth would leave United on the expiry of her contract at the end of the month. At the time, Sigsworth departed the club as the third highest goalscorer behind Ella Toone and Lauren James.

=== Leicester City, 2021–23 ===
On 16 July 2021, Sigsworth signed for newly-promoted Leicester City ahead of their maiden FA WSL season. In February 2022, Sigsworth ruptured her ACL ending her season early.

=== Sheffield United, 2023-2024 ===
On 21 July 2023, Sigsworth signed for Sheffield United.

On July 31, 2024, Sigsworth announced her retirement at the age of 29.

== International career ==
Sigsworth has represented England at under-17, under-19, under-20 and under-23 levels.

In April 2011, Sigsworth scored for the under-17s in a 1–0 win against Sweden in the UEFA European Women's Under-17 Championship second qualifying round. In August 2013, Sigsworth was part of the England under-19 team who finished as runners-up to France at the UEFA Women's Under-19 Championship in Wales. In July 2014, Sigsworth was named as part of the England under-20 squad for the FIFA U-20 Women's World Cup. Sigsworth started all three games as England failed to progress, having finished third in Group C.

== Post playering career ==
Sigsworth was medically retired from professional football. Following her retirement, she began training and work as a firefighter with the Greater Manchester Fire and Rescue Service.

== Career statistics ==
=== Club ===
As of match played 3 march 2024.

Appearances and goals by club, season and competition
Club	Season	League			FA Cup (Note: Includes the Women's FA Cup)		League Cup (Note: Includes the WSL Cup/Women's League Cup)		Total	
Club	Season	Division	Apps	Goals	Apps	Goals	Apps	Goals	Apps	Goals
Doncaster Belles	2011	WSL 1	6	0	—		1	0	7	0
Doncaster Belles	2012	WSL 1	14	1	2	0	3	0	19	1
Doncaster Belles	2013	WSL 1	10	1	—		3	1	13	2
Doncaster Belles	2014	WSL 2	14	5	2	1	5	2	21	8
Doncaster Belles	Total		44	7	4	1	12	3	60	11
Notts County	2015	WSL 1	0	0	0	0	0	0	0	0
Doncaster Belles	2016	WSL 1	7	1	1	1	1	0	9	2
Doncaster Belles	2017	WSL 2	0	0	—		0	0	0	0
Doncaster Belles	2017–18	WSL 2	18	16	—		3	2	21	18
Doncaster Belles	Total		25	17	1	1	4	2	30	20
Manchester United	2018–19	Championship	19	17	3	0	6	1	28	18
Manchester United	2019–20	WSL	14	2	1	0	5	2	20	4
Manchester United	2020–21	WSL	14	3	2	1	2	0	18	4
Manchester United	Total		47	22	6	1	13	3	66	26
Leicester City F.C.	2021-22	WSL	13	2	1	0	3	0	17	2
Leicester City F.C.	2022-23	WSL	1	0	0	0	0	0	1	0
Leicester City F.C.	Total		14	2	1	0	3	0	18	2
Sheffield United F.C.	2023-24	Championship	16	1	1	1	2	1	19	3
Career total			142	49	13	3	34	9	189	62

== Honours ==
Doncaster Rovers Belles

- FA WSL 2: 2017–18

Manchester United

- FA Women's Championship: 2018–19

Individual

- FA WSL 2 / FA Women's Championship Golden Boot: 2017–18, 2018–19

== See also ==
- List of Manchester United W.F.C. records and statistics
- List of Manchester United W.F.C. players
