= Fran Bentley =

English footballer (born 2001)

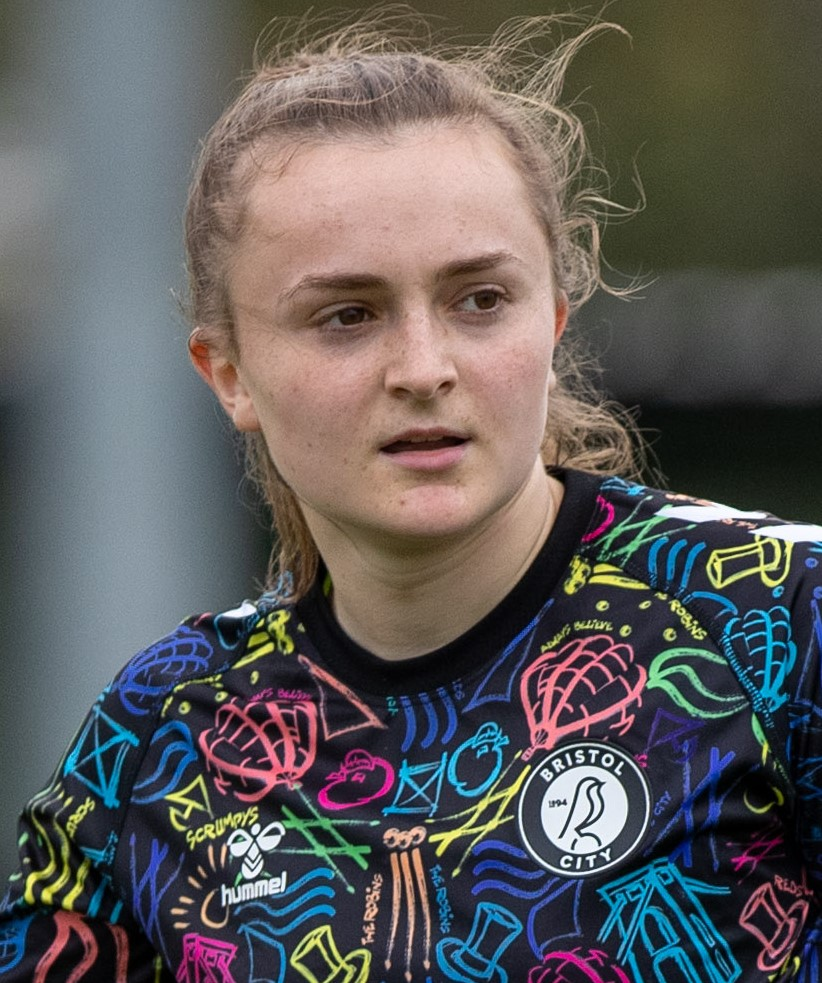
- Bentley with Bristol City in 2022

Personal information
- Full name: Francesca Bentley
- Date of birth: 26 June 2001 (age 25)
- Place of birth: Southampton, Hampshire, England
- Position: Goalkeeper

Team information
- Current team: Bristol City
- Number: 1

Youth career
- 2010–2015: Manchester United
- 2015–2018: Manchester City

Senior career*
Years	Team	Apps	(Gls)
2017–2018	Manchester City	0	(0)
2018–2021	Manchester United	1	(0)
2019	→ Sheffield United (loan)	6	(0)
2020	→ Blackburn Rovers (loan)	4	(0)
2021–2022	→ Bristol City (loan)	19	(0)
2022–	Bristol City	55	(0)

International career^{‡}
2017–2018	England U17	3	(0)
2018–2019	England U18	3	(0)
2021–2024	England U23	0	(0)
- * Club domestic league appearances and goals as of 31 July 2025 ‡ National team caps and goals as of 29 October 2024

Francesca Bentley (born 26 June 2001) is an English footballer who plays as a goalkeeper for Bristol City of the Women's Super League. She has previously played in the youth ranks at Manchester City, Manchester United on loan at Sheffield United, Blackburn Rovers and Bristol City, and has represented England from under-15 to under-23 youth level.

== Club career ==
=== Early career ===
Bentley joined Manchester United aged nine and remained at the club for five years. In 2015, she joined local rivals Manchester City due to the limited first team opportunities available at her former club.

=== Manchester City ===
In July 2017, Bentley signed with the Manchester City development squad for the 2017–18 season and became a regular for the club. In April 2018, she helped the club win the FA Development League Cup. Bentley was named as an unused substitute for the first team on two occasions as they finished runners-up in the Women's Super League and the FA WSL Cup.

=== Manchester United ===
On 1 July 2018, Bentley returned to her former club and joined Manchester United ahead of their inaugural season in the FA Women's Championship, one of seven players to return to the senior side having played for the club at youth level. She made her senior debut as a 59th-minute substitute in a Championship game against Millwall with the score at 6–0. The game finished 8–0.

==== 2018–19 season: Loan to Sheffield United ====
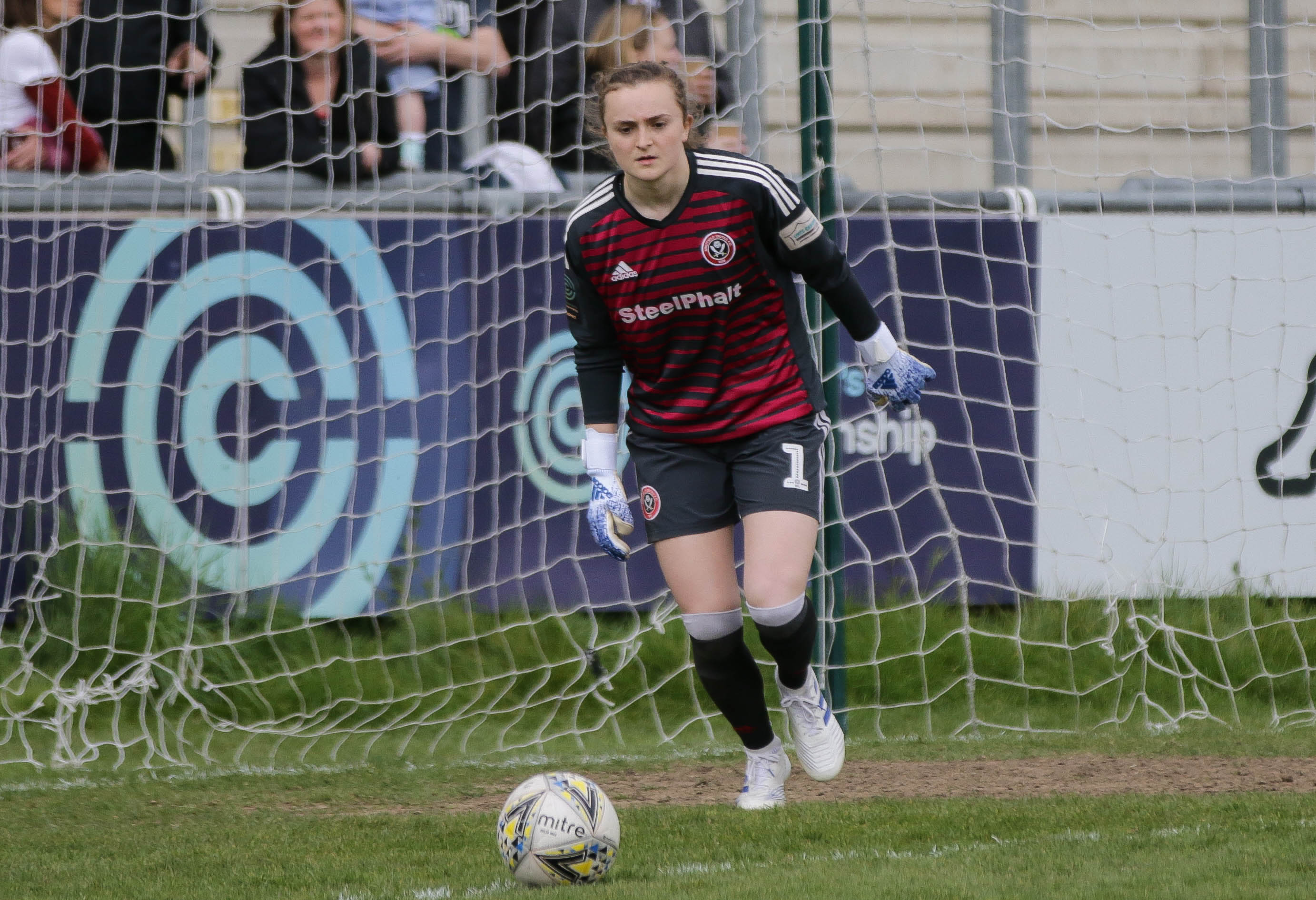
Bentley with Sheffield United

On 8 February 2019, she was loaned to fellow Championship side Sheffield United until the end of the season. She played in six games during the loan, conceded four goals and won every game. She assisted fellow Manchester United loanee Ebony Salmon's goal in a 2–1 win over Tottenham Hotspur.

==== 2019–20 season ====
Bentley missed the start of the 2019–20 season after suffering a fractured humerus while on international duty with England under-18s.

==== 2020–21 season: Loan to Blackburn Rovers ====
On 1 September 2020, Bentley signed a season-long loan deal with Blackburn Rovers of the FA Women's Championship. She made her league debut five days later in a 3–0 defeat to Leicester City. She made four appearances before United recalled her in December.

==== 2021–22 season: Loan to Bristol City ====
On 6 August 2021, Bentley signed a new two-year contract with Manchester United before joining Championship side Bristol City on a season-long loan. She made her debut on 29 August in Bristol City's opening game of the season, a 4–3 defeat to Crystal Palace. She played 22 games in total, keeping ten clean sheets as Bristol finished third and was named Young Player of the Season at the club's end of season awards.

=== Bristol City ===
Following a season-long loan, Bentley joined Bristol City permanently on 1 July 2022 on a two-year contract. Bentley captained the squad as it won the 2022-23 Women's Championship season, earning promotion to the Women's Super League. Bentley won the club's Players’ Player of the Season award, and kept 13 clean sheets to win the Barclays Women's Championship Golden Glove for the 2022–23 season. On 30 June 2025, it was announced that Bentley had signed a new two-year contract with Bristol City.

== International career ==
Having played for the England under-15s, on 28 April 2017, Bentley made her debut for under-17s in a 2–0 defeat to the United States. Six months later, she made her competitive debut and kept her first clean sheet for England in a 10–0 victory against Latvia in UEFA Women's Under-17 Championship qualification. Bentley made five appearances to help England qualify for the tournament.

== Personal life ==
While playing for Manchester United, she enrolled onto the BTEC Level 3 Extended Diploma Business course at Wigan and Leigh College.

Bentley is in a relationship with fellow women's footballer and England youth teammate Katie Robinson.

== Career statistics ==
As of match played 8 December 2024

Appearances and goals by club, season and competition
Club	Season	League			FA Cup (Note: Includes the Women's FA Cup)		League Cup (Note: Includes the WSL Cup/Women's League Cup)		Total	
Club	Season	Division	Apps	Goals	Apps	Goals	Apps	Goals	Apps	Goals
Manchester City	2017–18	WSL 1	0	0	0	0	0	0	0	0
Manchester City	Total		0	0	0	0	0	0	0	0
Manchester United	2018–19	Championship	1	0	0	0	0	0	1	0
Manchester United	2019–20	FA WSL	0	0	0	0	0	0	0	0
Manchester United	2020–21	FA WSL	0	0	1	0	0	0	1	0
Manchester United	Total		1	0	1	0	0	0	2	0
Sheffield United (loan)	2018–19	Championship	6	0	0	0	0	0	6	0
Sheffield United (loan)	Total		6	0	0	0	0	0	6	0
Blackburn Rovers (loan)	2020–21	Championship	4	0	0	0	0	0	4	0
Blackburn Rovers (loan)	Total		4	0	0	0	0	0	4	0
Bristol City	2021–22	Championship	19	0	2	0	1	0	22	0
Bristol City	2022–23	Championship	22	0	3	0	0	0	25	0
Bristol City	2023–24	FA WSL	5	0	0	0	0	0	5	0
Bristol City	2024-25	Championship	19	0	1	0	0	0	20	0
Bristol City	2025-26	Championship	16	0	2	0	0	0	18	0
Bristol City	Total		81	0	8	0	1	0	90	0
Career total			92	0	9	0	1	0	102	0

== Honours ==
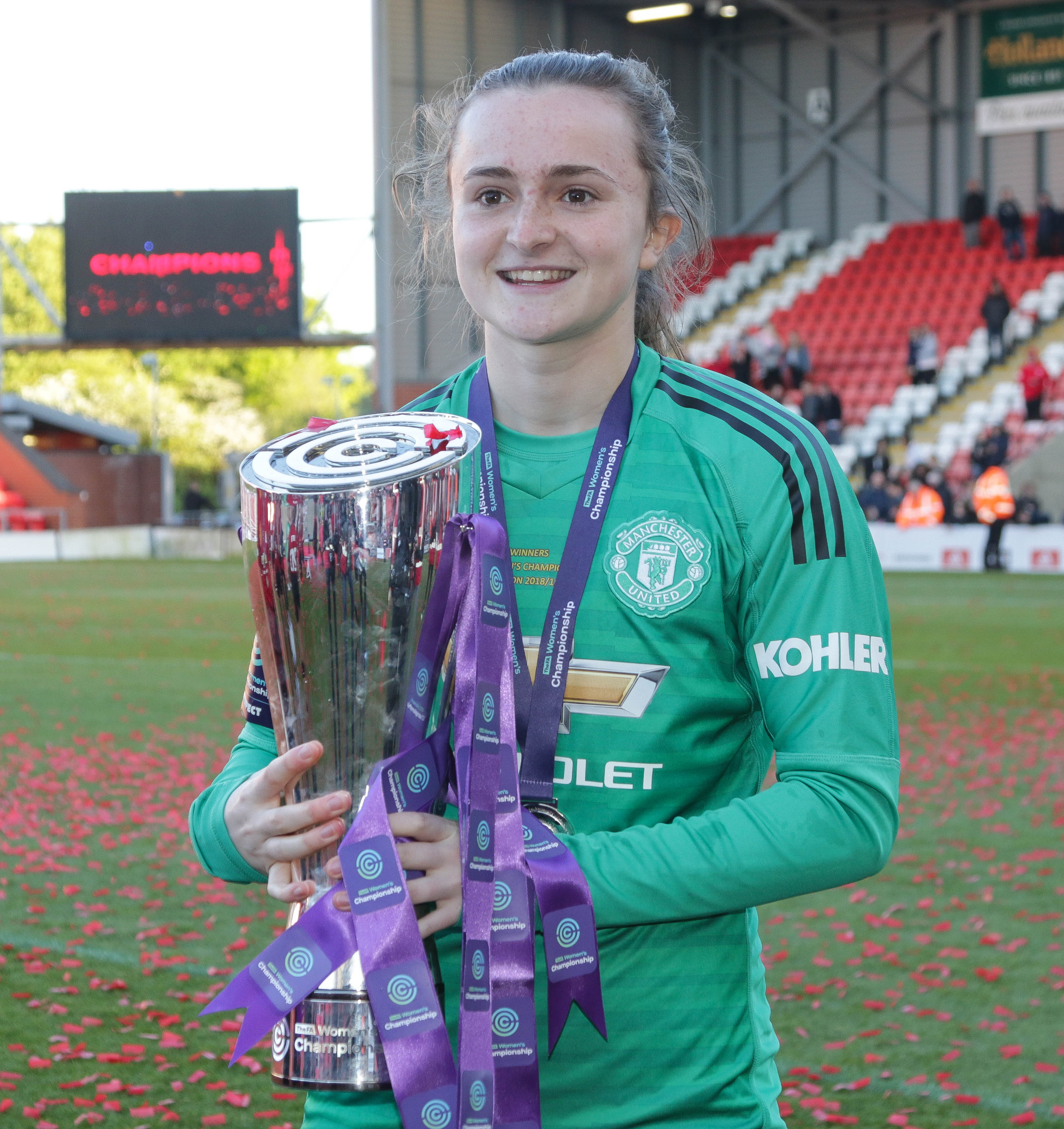
Bentley holding the Championship trophy after winning the 2018–19 season with Manchester United.

Manchester United

- FA Women's Championship: 2018–19

Bristol City

- FA Women's Championship: 2022–23

Individual

- FA Women's Championship: Golden Glove Winner (Best Goalkeeper) 2022–23
- Bristol City Women's Young Player Of The Year Award - 2021/22
- Bristol City Women's Players Player Of The Year Award - 2022/23
