= Charlotte Kerr (footballer) =

English footballer (born 1994)

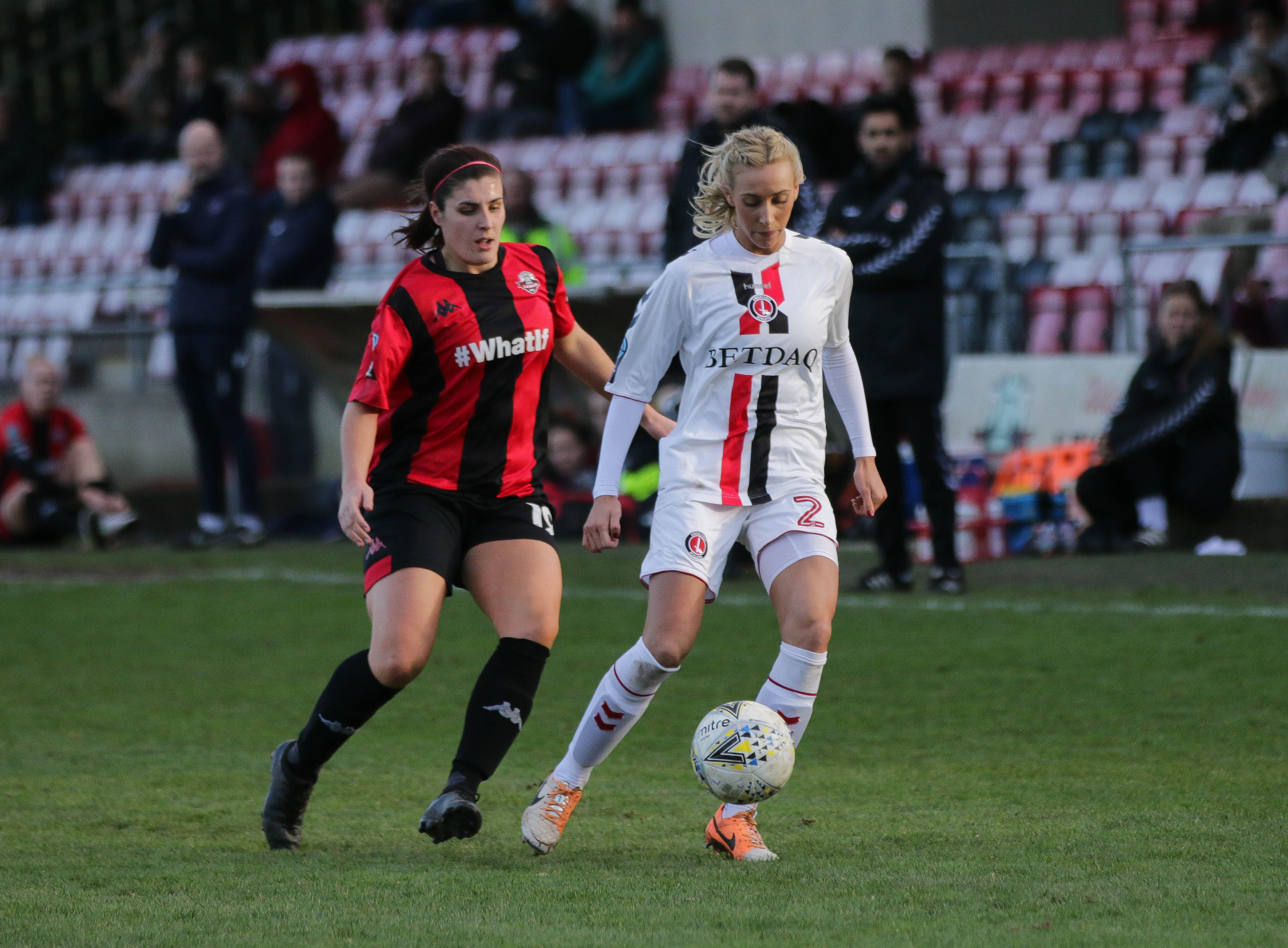
- Kerr (right) in December 2018

Personal information
- Full name: Charlotte Kerr
- Date of birth: 26 November 1994 (age 31)
- Place of birth: Enfield, England
- Positions: Defender; midfielder

Youth career
- Watford

Senior career*
Years	Team	Apps	(Gls)
2016–2018	Watford	42	(6)
2018–2019	Charlton Athletic	24	(0)
- * Club domestic league appearances and goals as of 26 November 2019

Charlotte Kerr (born 26 November 1994) is an English footballer who plays as a defender or midfielder. Kerr last played for FA Women's Championship team Charlton Athletic.

== Club career ==
Kerr came up through Watford's youth ranks, spending nearly a decade at the club and featuring for the team at WSL 2 level.

On 9 July 2018, Kerr chose to stay in the rebranded FA Women's Championship and join Charlton Athletic after Watford declined to apply for a tier-two license and were relegated to the FA Women's National League. On 16 January 2019, Kerr was involved in a serious collision during a match against Manchester United. The match had to be abandoned after all the emergency oxygen had been used. The incident received widespread national coverage, scrutinising inadequate medical provisions in women's football. Charlton Athletic were eventually cleared of the incident. In June 2019, Kerr signed a new two-year deal with the club but had the contract mutually terminated in November 2019, instead opting to take a break from football.
