= Lucy Roberts =

English footballer (born 2001)

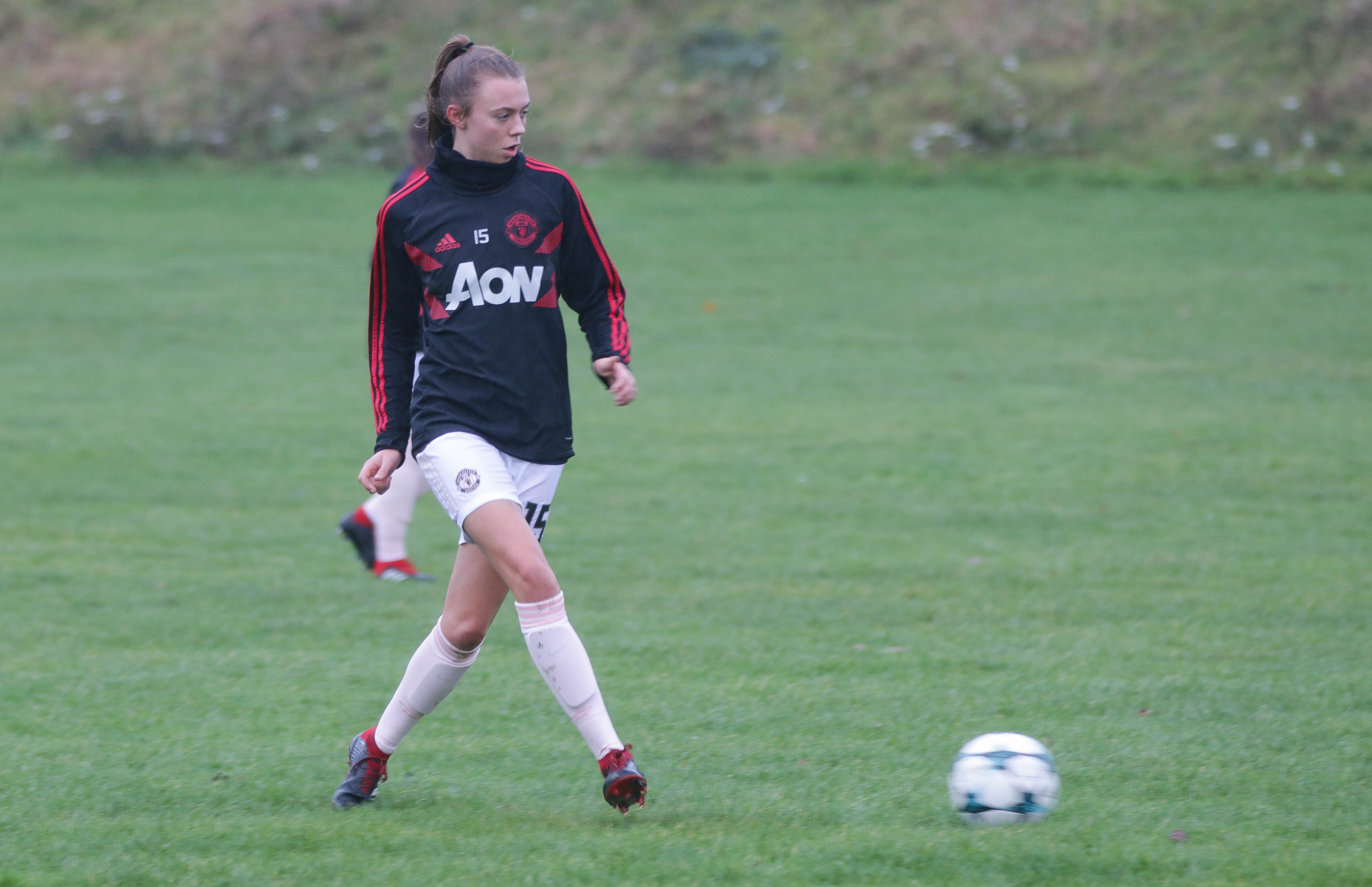

Personal information
- Date of birth: 11 May 2001 (age 25)
- Place of birth: Crewe, England
- Height: 5 ft 10 in (1.78 m)
- Position: Defender

Team information
- Current team: Copenhagen

Youth career
- –2013: Stoke City
- 2013–2017: Liverpool

College career
Years	Team	Apps	(Gls)
2019–2022	South Florida Bulls	58	(6)
2023	Louisville Cardinals	17	(2)

Senior career*
Years	Team	Apps	(Gls)
2017–2018	Liverpool	1	(0)
2018–2019	Manchester United	0	(0)
2019	→ Huddersfield Town (loan)	6	(2)
2023	North Carolina Courage U23		
2024–2025	OB Q	22	(1)
2025	Kristianstad	9	(0)
2026–	Copenhagen	0	(0)

International career^{‡}
2017–2018	England U17	11	(0)
2019	England U19	4	(1)
- * Club domestic league appearances and goals as of 15:43, 23 January 2026 (UTC) ‡ National team caps and goals as of 5 October 2019

Lucy Roberts (born 11 May 2001) is an English professional footballer who plays as a defender for Copenhagen.

She has previously played for Women's Super League clubs Liverpool and Huddersfield Town (on loan from Manchester United), college teams the South Florida Bulls and the Louisville Cardinals, and Danish Women's League club Odense BK Q. She has represented England at the under-17 and under-19 level.

== Club career ==
=== Liverpool ===
Roberts joined Liverpool from Stoke City when she was 12 years old and progressed through the club's Centre of Excellence and Development squads, making her professional debut in an FA Cup game against Watford on 4 February 2018. In doing so she became Liverpool's youngest full debutant of the FA WSL era at the age of 16 years 269 days.

=== Manchester United ===
On 1 July 2018, Roberts joined the newly formed Manchester United to compete in their inaugural season. She spent the season with the academy side, reaching the final of the FA WSL Academy Cup, and in the National League with Huddersfield Town, appearing six times and scoring two goals. She was released at the end of the season having not made a senior appearance for United.

=== University of South Florida, 2019–2022 ===
On 17 July 2019, Roberts enrolled at the University of South Florida in the United States, to play in their women's soccer team. As a rookie Roberts was named to the Top Drawer Soccer Preseason Best XI freshman team and went on to make 17 appearances in her debut season, missing time due to national team obligations. At the end of the campaign she was one of only two unanimous selections to the All-AAC Rookie XI.

=== University of Louisville, 2023 ===
In December 2022, Roberts transferred to the University of Louisville to play the 2023 season with the Louisville Cardinals.

=== Odense Blodklub Q, 2024– ===
In August 2024, Roberts joined newly-promoted Danish Women's League side Odense Boldklub Q.

After a spell in Sweden with Kristianstad, Roberts joined B-Liga side Copenhagen in January 2026. Later the same season, she helped the team securing promotion to the A-Liga.

== International career ==
After helping the team to qualify, Roberts travelled to Lithuania in May 2018 as part of the England under-17 squad to compete in the UEFA Women's Under-17 Championship as the team reached the semi-finals. On 30 September 2019, Roberts was selected in the England under-19 squad that began the 2020 UEFA Under-19 Championship qualification. Three days later, Roberts scored her first goal in an 8–0 win against Cyprus.

== Personal life ==
Roberts is the great-great-granddaughter of Manchester United and England defender Charlie Roberts, who played for the club from 1904 to 1913 and became the first captain to lead United out at Old Trafford in 1910.

== Career statistics ==
=== Club ===
As of match played 15 May 2019

Appearances and goals by club, season and competition
Club	Season	League			FA Cup (Note: Includes the FA Women's Cup)		League Cup (Note: Includes the FA WSL Cup)		Total	
Club	Season	Division	Apps	Goals	Apps	Goals	Apps	Goals	Apps	Goals
Liverpool	2017–18	WSL 1	1	0	1	0	0	0	2	0
Manchester United	2018–19	Championship	0	0	0	0	0	0	0	0
Huddersfield Town (loan)	2018–19	Northern Premier	6	2	0	0	0	0	6	2
Career total			7	2	1	0	0	0	8	2
