= Carla Ward =

English footballer and coach (born 1983)

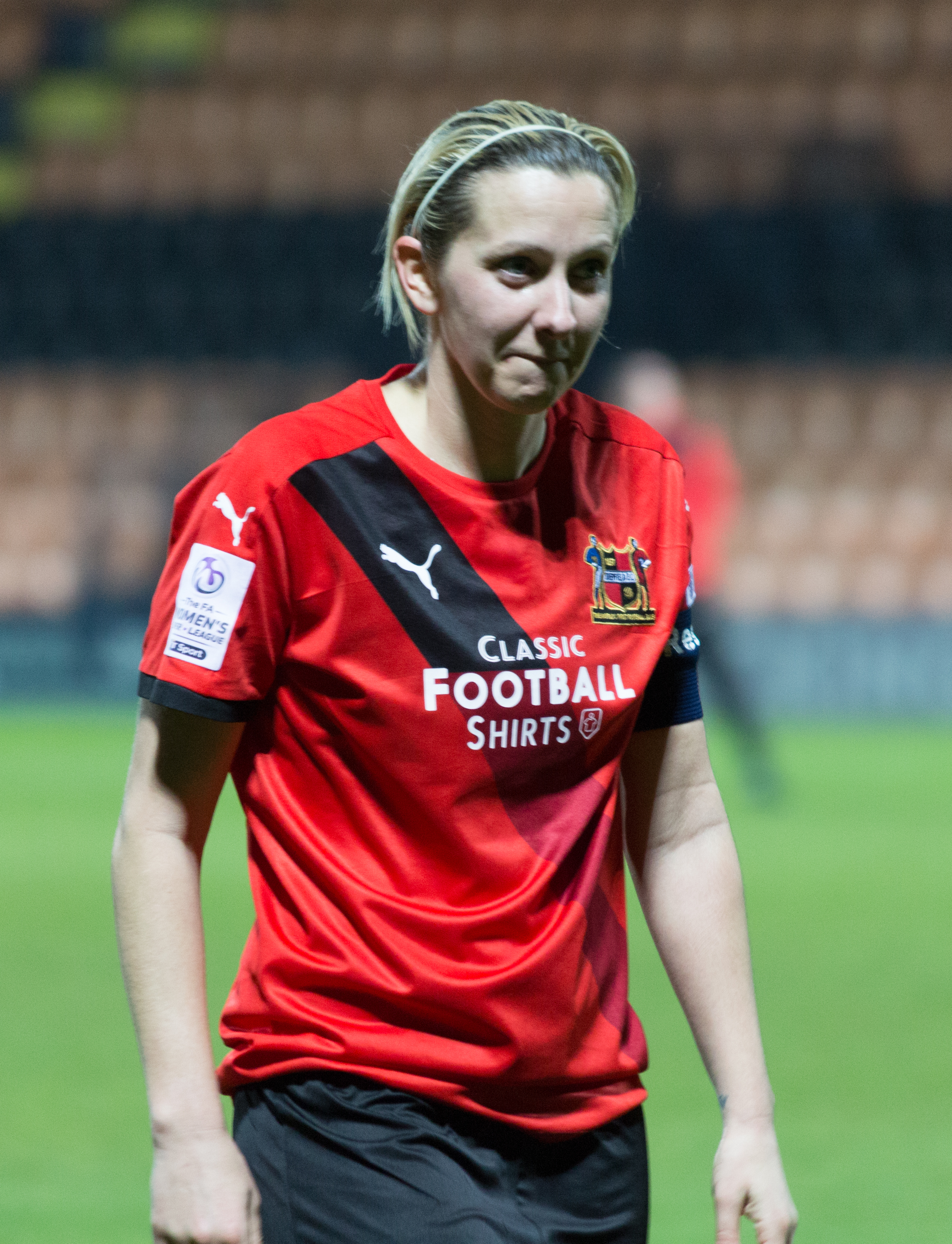
- Ward playing for Sheffield FC in 2017

Personal information
- Date of birth: 21 December 1983 (age 42)
- Place of birth: Isle of Wight, England
- Height: 1.72 m (5 ft 8 in)
- Position: Midfielder

Team information
- Current team: Republic of Ireland (head coach)

Youth career
- Torquay United L.F.C

Senior career*
Years	Team	Apps	(Gls)
- Bristol City
2004–2006	Bristol Rovers		
2006–2007	Sporting Plaza de Argel		
2007	Leeds United		
2007–2011	Lincoln Ladies		
2011–2017	Sheffield FC	200+	(100+)
2017–2018	Sheffield United		

Managerial career
- 2018–2020: Sheffield United
- 2020–2021: Birmingham City
- 2021–2024: Aston Villa
- 2025–: Republic of Ireland
- * Club domestic league appearances and goals

Carla Ward (born 21 December 1983) is an English football coach and former midfielder who serves as the head coach of the Republic of Ireland women's national team.

== Early life ==
Born on the Isle of Wight, Ward grew up on a council estate in Torquay where she learned to play football in the street.

== Club career ==
After a season in Spain with Sporting Plaza de Argel, Ward joined Leeds United for 2007–08, but signed for Lincoln in December 2007. In summer 2009 Doncaster Rovers Belles beat competition from other Premier League clubs to secure Ward's signature, but she experienced a "change of heart" and returned to Lincoln after a few weeks. When Lincoln were accepted into the new FA WSL, Ward moved to Sheffield FC, initially on loan.

In November 2017, club captain Ward left Sheffield FC after more than 200 appearances and over 100 goals.

== Managerial career ==
=== Sheffield United ===
In November 2017, Ward joined Sheffield United in the FA Women's Premier League Midlands Division One as player-assistant manager. She took over as interim manager on 17 January 2018 after Dan O'Hearne stepped down before being given the job on a permanent basis. In her first game as interim manager, United beat Birmingham & West Midlands 5–0 followed up with a 10–0 victory over Rotherham United. Ward was involved in the club's successful application to the FA Women's Championship. In total, Ward managed for 58 games, taking the team to a 5th place Championship finish in the 2018–19 season and a 2nd place finish in the 2019–20 season before mutually agreeing to depart in July 2020.

=== Birmingham City ===
In August 2020, Ward was appointed by Birmingham City with the team in the middle of a rebuild having narrowly escaped relegation the season before and only retaining ten senior players following an offseason exodus. During her tenure, the players formally issued a list of complaints to the club's board, stating that the club was "preventing us from performing our jobs to the best of our ability." Concerns included lack of facilities, medical support and travel provisions. Ward was named to WSL Manager of the Year shortlist at the end of the season, steering the team away from relegation as Birmingham finishing 11th of 12 teams. On 14 May 2021, Ward announced her resignation effective as of the team's final game of the season on 16 May 2021.

=== Aston Villa ===
On 20 May 2021, following her resignation from Birmingham City, Ward was appointed manager of rival FA WSL side Aston Villa. Ward's first season led to a 9th place finish in the WSL. In the 2022/23 season, Aston Villa finished 5th, and also reached the semi-finals of the FA Cup in a season that saw new signing Rachel Daly win the WSL Golden Boot. In May 2023, Ward signed a new contract with Aston Villa until the end of the 2024/25 season. On 3 May 2024, it was announced that Ward would step down as manager at the end of the 2023/24 season.

=== Republic of Ireland ===
On 15 January 2025, Ward was announced as the new head coach for the Republic of Ireland national team, replacing Eileen Gleeson.

Under Ward, Ireland won five and lost only once in their 2025 UEFA Women's Nations League group, guiding them to promotion to the top division via a 5-4 aggregate play-off win over Belgium.

== Managerial statistics ==
As of 9 October 2026

Managerial record by team and tenure
Team	From	To	Record								Ref
Team	From	To	P	W	D	L	GF	GA	GD	Win %	Ref
Sheffield United	17 January 2018	7 July 2020	58	34	7	17	141	88	+53	58.62	
Birmingham City	13 August 2020	16 May 2021	26	6	7	13	24	47	−23	23.08	
Aston Villa	20 May 2021	18 May 2024	66	24	10	32	87	120	−33	36.36	
Republic of Ireland	15 January 2025	present	18	11	0	7	35	27	+8	61.11	
Career totals			168	75	24	69	287	282	+5	44.64	

== Honours ==
Individual

- FA Women's Super League Manager of the Month: September 2022, January 2023
