= 2018–19 FA Women's Championship =

FA Women's Championship
- Season: 2018–19
- Champions: Manchester United
- Matches: 110
- Goals: 394 (3.58 per match)
- Top goalscorer: 17 goals Jessica Sigsworth, Manchester United
- Biggest home win: Manchester United 9–0 London Bees (6 January 2019)
- Biggest away win: Aston Villa 0–12 Manchester United (9 September 2018)
- Highest scoring: Aston Villa 0–12 Manchester United (9 September 2018)

The 2018–19 FA Women's Championship was the first rebranded edition of the FA Women's Championship, the second tier of women's football in England, renamed from the FA WSL 2 which was founded in 2014. The season ran from 8 September 2018 to 12 May 2019.

On 20 April 2019, Manchester United won the title, and promotion to the FA WSL, with two games to spare in their debut season after recording a 7–0 victory over Crystal Palace. Tottenham Hotspur subsequently secured second place and promotion following a 1–1 draw at Aston Villa in their penultimate fixture. Millwall Lionesses finished bottom but were spared relegation as the FA sought to expand both of the top two divisions to twelve teams each by 2019–20.

== Teams ==
Location of clubs for the 2018–19 season

Eleven teams compete in the league. Following restructuring of the women's game in order to provide for a fully professional Women's Super League (WSL), membership of both the first and second tier is subject to a license, based on a series of off-the-field criteria. Existing WSL teams were first offered the opportunity to bid for licenses, with all applying FA WSL 2 clubs retaining their place in the second tier, except for Brighton & Hove Albion who were offered a place in the WSL. From the second tier, Oxford United and Watford did not apply for licenses.

This left up to two places in the WSL and up to five places in the Championship for applying clubs, of which one place in the Championship was reserved for the winners of the FA Women's Premier League Championship play-off, providing that club met the licensing criteria. Fifteen applications were received for both the top two tiers, and five of these applicants were accepted into the Championship: Manchester United, Lewes, Leicester City, Sheffield United as well as Premiership play-off winners, Charlton Athletic.

Sheffield announced on 24 June 2018 that it was withdrawing from the league ahead of the season, due to the financial commitments required by The Football Association proving too onerous. Doncaster Rovers Belles announced similarly on 12 July 2018. A place in the league was subsequently awarded to Crystal Palace.

Team	Location	Ground	Capacity	2017–18 season
Aston Villa	Tamworth	The Lamb Ground	4,000	9th
Charlton Athletic	Thamesmead	Bayliss Avenue	6,000	1st, WPL South
Crystal Palace	Bromley	Hayes Lane	5,000	3rd, WPL South
Durham	Durham	New Ferens Park	3,000	4th
Leicester City	Quorn	Farley Way Stadium	1,400	2nd, WPL North
Lewes	Lewes	The Dripping Pan	3,000	5th, WPL South
London Bees	Canons Park	The Hive Stadium	5,176	6th
Manchester United	Leigh	Leigh Sports Village	12,000	n/a
Millwall Lionesses	Dartford	Princes Park	2,500	3rd
Sheffield United	Sheffield	Olympic Legacy Park	2,000	3rd, WPL Div 1, Midlands
Tottenham Hotspur	Cheshunt	Cheshunt Stadium	3,000	7th

== Table ==
For the inaugural season, the top two teams will be automatically promoted subject to obtaining a licence. There will be no relegation at the end of the campaign with a view to expanding the top two tiers to twelve teams each by 2019–20.

Pos	Team	Pld	W	D	L	GF	GA	GD	Pts	Qualification
1	Manchester United (C, P)	20	18	1	1	98	7	+91	55	Promotion to the WSL (Note: Dependent on obtaining a licence.)
2	Tottenham Hotspur (P)	20	15	1	4	44	27	+17	46	Promotion to the WSL
3	Charlton Athletic	20	13	2	5	49	21	+28	41	
4	Durham	20	11	6	3	37	16	+21	39	
5	Sheffield United	20	11	1	8	35	31	+4	34	
6	Aston Villa	20	6	8	6	30	39	−9	26	
7	Leicester City	20	6	3	11	27	44	−17	21	
8	London Bees	20	7	0	13	23	48	−25	21	
9	Lewes	20	5	2	13	23	47	−24	17	
10	Crystal Palace	20	3	2	15	14	44	−30	11	
11	Millwall Lionesses	20	1	2	17	14	70	−56	5	

Source: FA WSL
Rules for classification: 1) Points; 2) Goal difference; 3) Number of goals scored
(C) Champions; (P) Promoted

== Results ==
Home \ Away	AST	CHA	CRY	DUR	LCW	LEW	LON	MNU	MIL	SHU	TOT
Aston Villa	—	2–0	0–0	0–0	0–0	2–2	1–3	0–12	2–0	5–1	1–1
Charlton Athletic	2–0	—	2–1	2–2	4–0	4–1	2–0	1–2	3–0	2–0	2–3
Crystal Palace	1–3	1–4	—	0–2	0–2	0–3	1–0	0–5	3–1	0–1	1–2
Durham	2–2	2–2	2–0	—	0–2	5–0	1–0	3–1	1–0	1–2	0–2
Leicester City	1–1	0–4	2–3	1–1	—	4–0	4–2	0–7	3–2	1–2	0–3
Lewes	1–1	0–2	2–1	0–1	4–3	—	0–2	0–2	2–0	0–3	1–3
London Bees	1–5	1–2	2–1	0–1	2–1	3–2	—	0–5	2–1	2–0	0–3
Manchester United	5–0	3–0	7–0	0–0	6–1	5–0	9–0	—	8–0	3–0	4–1
Millwall Lionesses	1–3	0–8	1–1	1–5	1–2	0–3	3–1	0–5	—	1–1	2–3
Sheffield United	4–1	2–3	2–0	0–2	1–0	3–2	4–1	0–4	6–0	—	1–2
Tottenham Hotspur	2–1	1–0	1–0	1–6	1–0	3–0	2–1	1–5	8–0	1–2	—

Updated to match(es) played on 11 May 2019. Source: FA WSL
Legend: Blue = home team win; Yellow = draw; Red = away team win.

== Top goalscorers ==
As of 11 May 2019

Rank	Player	Team	Goals
1	(England) Jessica Sigsworth	Manchester United	17
2	(England) Rianna Dean	Tottenham Hotspur	14
2	(Kosovo) Elizabeta Ejupi	Charlton Athletic	14
2	(England) Lauren James	Manchester United	14
2	(England) Ella Toone	Manchester United	14
6	(England) Mollie Green	Manchester United	13
7	(England) Kit Graham	Charlton Athletic	12
8	(England) Katie Zelem	Manchester United	10
9	(England) Beth Hepple	Durham	8
9	(England) Jodie Hutton	Aston Villa	8
9	(England) Jade Pennock	Sheffield United	8

== Awards ==
=== Player of the Month ===
Results of Player of the Month voting as polled by FA Women's Championship. Number of nominations in brackets.

Month	Winner		Nominated	
Month	Player	Club	Player	Club
September	(England) Lauren James	Manchester United	(England) Rebecca Carter	Lewes
September	(England) Lauren James	Manchester United	(England) Jessica Sigsworth	Manchester United
September	(England) Lauren James	Manchester United	(Wales) Sarah Wiltshire	Tottenham Hotspur
October	(England) Rianna Dean	Tottenham Hotspur	(England) Rosie Axten	Leicester City
October	(England) Rianna Dean	Tottenham Hotspur	(England) Kit Graham	Charlton Athletic
October	(England) Rianna Dean	Tottenham Hotspur	(Wales) Sarah Wiltshire (2)	Tottenham Hotspur
November	(England) Mollie Green	Manchester United	(England) Sophie Barker	Sheffield United
November	(England) Mollie Green	Manchester United	(England) Abi Cottam	Durham
November	(England) Mollie Green	Manchester United	(England) Katie Startup	Charlton Athletic
December	(England) Beth Hepple	Durham	(Albania) Elizabeta Ejupi	Charlton Athletic
December	(England) Beth Hepple	Durham	(England) Lily Agg	Charlton Athletic
December	(England) Beth Hepple	Durham	(Republic of Ireland) Emma Beckett	London Bees
January	(Wales) Sarah Wiltshire (3)	Tottenham Hotspur	(England) Rianna Dean (2)	Tottenham Hotspur
January	(Wales) Sarah Wiltshire (3)	Tottenham Hotspur	(Scotland) Zoe Ness	Durham
January	(Wales) Sarah Wiltshire (3)	Tottenham Hotspur	(England) Evie Clarke	Millwall Lionesses
February	(England) Ella Toone	Manchester United	(England) Angela Addison	Tottenham Hotspur
February	(England) Ella Toone	Manchester United	(England) Gemma Bryan	Crystal Palace
February	(England) Ella Toone	Manchester United	(England) Evie Clarke (2)	Millwall Lionesses
March	(England) Katie Zelem	Manchester United	(England) Jade Pennock	Sheffield United
March	(England) Katie Zelem	Manchester United	(England) Kit Graham (2)	Charlton Athletic
March	(England) Katie Zelem	Manchester United	(England) Maddy Cusack	Sheffield United
April	(England) Ashleigh Neville	Tottenham Hotspur	(England) Danielle Cox	Sheffield United
April	(England) Ashleigh Neville	Tottenham Hotspur	(England) Charlie Devlin	Manchester United
April	(England) Ashleigh Neville	Tottenham Hotspur	(England) Lauren James (2)	Manchester United

=== LMA Manager of the Month ===
Results of Manager of the Month as awarded by the League Managers Association. Number of awards in brackets.

Month	Manager	Club
September	(England) Karen Hills	Tottenham Hotspur
October	(England) Lee Sanders	Durham
November	(England) Casey Stoney	Manchester United
January	(England) Karen Hills (2)	Tottenham Hotspur
February	(England) Casey Stoney (2)	Manchester United
March	(England) Carla Ward	Sheffield United
April	(England) Casey Stoney (3)	Manchester United

== See also ==
- 2018–19 FA Women's League Cup
- 2018–19 FA WSL (tier 1)
- 2018–19 FA Women's National League (tier 3)
