= 2025 Women's FA Cup final =

English football cup final

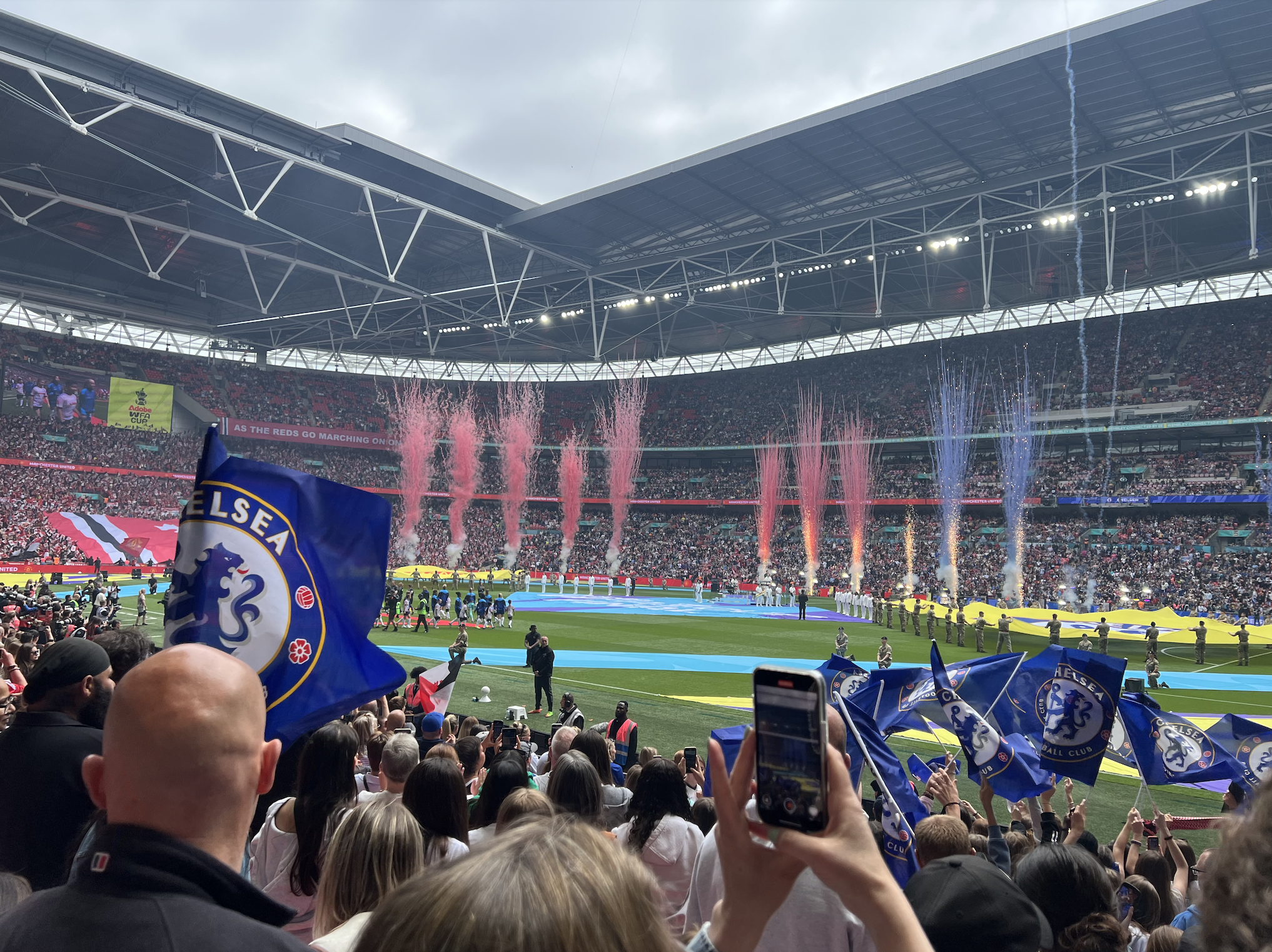
- The players walk on to the pitch at Wembley Stadium
- Event: 2024–25 Women's FA Cup
Chelsea	Manchester United
3	0
- Date: 18 May 2025
- Venue: Wembley Stadium, London
- Player of the Match: Erin Cuthbert (Chelsea)
- Referee: Stacey Fullicks (Northamptonshire)
- Attendance: 74,412

The 2025 Women's FA Cup final was the 55th final of the Women's FA Cup, England's primary cup competition for women's football teams. The showpiece event was the 31st to be played directly under the auspices of The Football Association and was named the Adobe Women's FA Cup final due to sponsorship reasons.

Chelsea faced title holders Manchester United in the final. This was United's third successive final, and a rematch of the 2023 final which Chelsea won 1–0. Chelsea won the match 3–0, winning their sixth FA Cup title and completing the domestic treble.

== Match ==
=== Details ===
18 May 2025
13:30 BST

Chelsea	3–0	Manchester United
Baltimore 45' (pen.), 90+1'; Macario 84'	Report

Wembley Stadium, London
Attendance: 74,412
Referee: Stacey Fullicks (Northamptonshire)

Chelsea	Manchester United

GK	24	(England) Hannah Hampton
CB	14	(Sweden) Nathalie Björn
CB	4	(England) Millie Bright (c)
CB	16	(United States) Naomi Girma
RWB	22	(England) Lucy Bronze		(substituted off) 90+4'
LWB	21	(England) Niamh Charles
RM	33	(England) Aggie Beever-Jones		(substituted off) 75'
CM	30	(England) Keira Walsh
CM	8	(Scotland) Erin Cuthbert	(yellow card) 56'	(substituted off) 90+4'
LM	17	(France) Sandy Baltimore	(yellow card) 90'	(substituted off) 90+4'
CF	7	(Colombia) Mayra Ramírez		(substituted off) 62'
Substitutes:
GK	38	(Jamaica) Rebecca Spencer
DF	12	(Canada) Ashley Lawrence
MF	6	(Germany) Sjoeke Nüsken		(substituted on) 90+4'
MF	11	(Norway) Guro Reiten		(substituted on) 90+4'
MF	18	(Netherlands) Wieke Kaptein		(substituted on) 75'
MF	19	(Sweden) Johanna Rytting Kaneryd		(substituted on) 90+4'
MF	27	(France) Oriane Jean-François
FW	9	(United States) Catarina Macario		(substituted on) 62'
FW	23	(Japan) Maika Hamano
Manager:
(France) Sonia Bompastor

GK	91	(United States) Phallon Tullis-Joyce
RB	5	(Republic of Ireland) Aoife Mannion		(substituted off) 70'
CB	4	(England) Maya Le Tissier (c)
CB	21	(England) Millie Turner		(substituted off) 46'
LB	3	(England) Gabby George	(yellow card) 72'	(substituted off) 76'
CM	20	(Japan) Hinata Miyazawa		(substituted off) 81'
CM	17	(Netherlands) Dominique Janssen
RW	15	(Norway) Celin Bizet		(substituted off) 81'
AM	8	(England) Grace Clinton	(yellow card) 53'
LW	11	(England) Leah Galton	(yellow card) 50'
CF	19	(Norway) Elisabeth Terland
Substitutes:
GK	1	(England) Kayla Rendell
GK	39	(Wales) Safia Middleton-Patel
DF	2	(Sweden) Anna Sandberg		(substituted on) 76'
MF	7	(England) Ella Toone		(substituted on) 46'
MF	13	(Canada) Simi Awujo
MF	16	(Norway) Lisa Naalsund		(substituted on) 81'
MF	48	(Wales) Mared Griffiths
FW	9	(France) Melvine Malard		(substituted on) 70'
FW	28	(England) Rachel Williams		(substituted on) 81'
Manager:
(England) Marc Skinner

Player of the Match:
Erin Cuthbert (Chelsea)

Assistant referees:
Isabel Chaplin (Suffolk)
Ceri Williams (Derbyshire)
Fourth official:
Megan Wilson (Sheffield & Hallamshire)
Fourth official:
Anastasiya Voloshchuk (London)
Video assistant referee:
Peter Bankes (Liverpool)
Assistant video assistant referee:
Eddie Smart (Birmingham)

Match rules

- 90 minutes
- 30 minutes of extra time if necessary
- Penalty shoot-out if scores still level
- Nine named substitutes
- Maximum of five substitutions, with a sixth allowed in extra time
