= World Sevens Football =

Women's association football tournament for clubs

- Founded: January 2025; 1 year ago
- Region: International
- Teams: 8
- Current champions: (England) Chelsea (1st title)
- Most championships: (Germany) Bayern Munich (United States) San Diego Wave FC (England) Chelsea (1 title each)
- Broadcaster(s): DAZN; Sky Sports (London 2026)
- Website: Official website
- London 2026

World Sevens Football (W7F) is a women's association football competition series format, which features existing clubs playing professional seven-a-side football.

== Format ==
World Sevens Football features a pitch half the size of a regulation (11-a-side) pitch and goals that are 2m tall and 5.5m wide. There is no offside rule. Games are played in two halves of fifteen minutes each, with rolling substitutions from an unlimited squad (with fourteen players for each match). In the case of games being tied, they go to 5 minutes extra time, and then sudden-death penalties. The organisers devised the format with the aim to appeal to "a new generation of fans."

Tournaments are invitational – with mainstream top-level women's football teams applying to be included – and feature eight teams split into two groups of four, with the groups followed by semi-finals and the final. The competition is not regulated by FIFA, and takes place outside the FIFA International Match Calendar, meaning there are no player release obligations for the clubs. The inaugural tournament was streamed live on DAZN. World Sevens Football was founded by Jennifer Mackesy and Justin Fishkin. Its player advisory council is composed of former internationals Anita Asante, Laura Georges, Tobin Heath, Kelley O'Hara, and Caroline Seger.

== Estoril 2025 ==
The inaugural tournament took place from 21–23 May 2025 at the Estádio António Coimbra da Mota in Estoril, Portugal. The site and dates were chosen due to their proximity to the 2024–25 UEFA Women's Champions League final, set to be held in Lisbon on 24 May. Participating teams were finalised during the later stages of the Champions League knock-out rounds, as only the two finalists were ineligible to take part.

In April 2025, Ajax, Bayern Munich, Benfica, and Manchester United were all confirmed as participants. In May 2025, Manchester City, AS Roma, Paris Saint-Germain and Rosengård joined the tournament.

=== Teams ===
All times are local, WEST (UTC+1).

=== Group 1 ===
Pos	Team	Pld	W	L	GF	GA	GD	Pts	Qualification
1	(Germany) Bayern Munich	3	3	0	11	3	+8	3	Advanced to knockout stage
2	(England) Manchester City	3	2	1	7	5	+2	2	Advanced to knockout stage
3	(Netherlands) Ajax	3	1	2	6	6	0	1	
4	(Sweden) Rosengård	3	0	3	0	10	−10	0	

Source: World Sevens

21 May 2025	Manchester City (England)	4–0	(Sweden) Rosengård	Estoril, Portugal
17:00	Fujino 2'; Kerolin 5', 16'; Oyama 25'	Report		Stadium: Estádio António Coimbra da Mota

21 May 2025	Ajax (Netherlands)	2–4	(Germany) Bayern Munich	Estoril, Portugal
19:00	Keukelaar 3'; Yohannes 27'	Report	Van Eijk 6' (o.g.); Viggósdóttir 11'; Hansen 17'; Dallmann 20'	Stadium: Estádio António Coimbra da Mota

22 May 2025	Manchester City (England)	2–2 (6–5 p)	(Netherlands) Ajax	Estoril, Portugal
13:30	Kerolin 4'; Park 17'	Report	Yohannes 24' (pen.); Noordman 30'	Stadium: Estádio António Coimbra da Mota
	Penalties
	Kerolin (penalty scored); Coombs (penalty scored); Fujino (penalty scored); Park (penalty scored); Keating (penalty missed); Kerolin (penalty scored); Coombs (penalty scored)		Yohannes (penalty scored); Kardinaal (penalty scored); Noordman (penalty scored) van Egmond (penalty scored) van Eijk (penalty missed); Yohannes (penalty scored); Kardinaal (penalty missed)

22 May 2025	Rosengård (Sweden)	0–4	(Germany) Bayern Munich	Estoril, Portugal
14:30		Report	Tanikawa 4'; Damnjanović 16'; Harder 18'; Zigiotti Olme 29'	Stadium: Estádio António Coimbra da Mota

22 May 2025	Bayern Munich (Germany)	3–1	(England) Manchester City	Estoril, Portugal
18:30	Dallmann 2'; Zigiotti Olme 19'; Plattner 24'	Report	Fujino 3'	Stadium: Estádio António Coimbra da Mota

22 May 2025	Rosengård (Sweden)	0–2	(Netherlands) Ajax	Estoril, Portugal
19:30		Report	Yohannes 5'; Jansen 26'	Stadium: Estádio António Coimbra da Mota

=== Group 2 ===
Pos	Team	Pld	W	L	GF	GA	GD	Pts	Qualification
1	(England) Manchester United	3	3	0	8	5	+3	3	Advanced to knockout stage
2	(France) Paris Saint-Germain	3	2	1	6	4	+2	2	Advanced to knockout stage
3	(Italy) AS Roma	3	1	2	5	7	−2	1	
4	(Portugal) Benfica	3	0	3	4	7	−3	0	

Source: World Sevens

21 May 2025	AS Roma (Italy)	2–3	(England) Manchester United	Estoril, Portugal
18:00	Giugliano 14', 18'	Report	Bizet 12'; Toone 14'; Clinton 20'	Stadium: Estádio António Coimbra da Mota

21 May 2025	Paris Saint-Germain (France)	2–1	(Portugal) Benfica	Estoril, Portugal
20:00	Benera 8'; Dorsin 23'	Report	Martins 8'	Stadium: Estádio António Coimbra da Mota

22 May 2025	AS Roma (Italy)	1–2 (a.e.t.)	(France) Paris Saint-Germain	Estoril, Portugal
15:30	Corelli 9'	Report	Echegini 20'; Leuchter 34'	Stadium: Estádio António Coimbra da Mota

22 May 2025	Manchester United (England)	3–1	(Portugal) Benfica	Estoril, Portugal
16:30	Bizet 2'; Awujo 11', 18'	Report	Norton 21'	Stadium: Estádio António Coimbra da Mota

22 May 2025	Benfica (Portugal)	2–2 (0–1 p)	(Italy) AS Roma	Estoril, Portugal
20:30	Amado 9'; Brown 30'	Report	Pilgrim 28' (pen.); Viens 29'	Stadium: Estádio António Coimbra da Mota
	Penalties
	Faria (penalty missed)		Haavi (penalty scored)

22 May 2025	Manchester United (England)	2–2 (7–6 p)	(France) Paris Saint-Germain	Estoril, Portugal
21:30	Le Tissier 5'; Simpson 20'	Report	Karchaoui 1'; Echegini 16'	Stadium: Estádio António Coimbra da Mota
	Penalties
	Le Tissier (penalty scored); Naalsund (penalty scored); Malard (penalty scored); Awujo (penalty scored); Rendell (penalty scored); Le Tissier (penalty scored); Naalsund (penalty scored)		Mbock (penalty scored); Geyoro (penalty scored); Karchaoui (penalty scored); Echegini (penalty scored); Kiedrzynek (penalty scored); Mbock (penalty scored); Geyoro (penalty missed)

=== Knockout stage ===
==== Bracket ====
Semi-finals
23 May
(Germany) Bayern Munich	5
(France) Paris Saint-Germain	0
23 May
(England) Manchester United	2
(England) Manchester City	0

Final
23 May
(Germany) Bayern Munich	2
(England) Manchester United	1
Third place
23 May
(France) Paris Saint-Germain	3
(England) Manchester City	1

==== Semi-finals ====
23 May 2025	Bayern Munich (Germany)	5–0	(France) Paris Saint-Germain	Estoril, Portugal
15:00	Damnjanović 14'; Plattner 15'; Tanikawa 21', 28'; Zadrazil 25'	Report		Stadium: Estádio António Coimbra da Mota

23 May 2025	Manchester United (England)	2–0	(England) Manchester City	Estoril, Portugal
16:30	Malard 4'; George 25'	Report		Stadium: Estádio António Coimbra da Mota

==== Third place match ====
23 May 2025	Paris Saint-Germain (France)	3–1	(England) Manchester City	Estoril, Portugal
18:30	Traoré 12'; Geyoro 19'; Hurtré 24'	Report	Park 9'	Stadium: Estádio António Coimbra da Mota

==== Final ====
23 May 2025	Bayern Munich (Germany)	2–1	(England) Manchester United	Estoril, Portugal
20:00	Tanikawa 22'; Zadrazil 26'	Report	Awujo 14'	Stadium: Estádio António Coimbra da Mota

=== Awards ===
Award	Player (club)	Ref.
Breakout Player	(Canada) Simi Awujo (Manchester United)	
Golden Ball	(Japan) Momoko Tanikawa (Bayern Munich)	
Golden Boot	(Japan) Momoko Tanikawa (Bayern Munich)	
Golden Glove	(Germany) Ena Mahmutovic (Bayern Munich)	

== Fort Lauderdale 2025 ==
The second tournament took place in December 2025, in Fort Lauderdale in the United States. Investment for five years of the format was made. In October 2025, AFC Toronto, Flamengo, Club América, Tigres UANL, the Kansas City Current, San Diego Wave FC, Deportivo Cali, and Nacional were confirmed as participants.

=== Teams ===
All times are local, EST (UTC−5).

=== Group 1 ===
Pos	Team	Pld	W	L	GF	GA	GD	Pts	Qualification
1	(Mexico) Tigres	3	2	1	8	4	+4	2	Advanced to knockout stage
2	(Brazil) Flamengo	3	2	1	5	7	−2	2	Advanced to knockout stage
3	(Canada) AFC Toronto	3	1	2	7	7	0	1	
4	(United States) Kansas City Current	3	1	2	6	8	−2	1	

Source: World Sevens

5 December 2025	Kansas City Current (United States)	2–3	(Brazil) Flamengo	Fort Lauderdale, Florida, United States
17:00	Pfeiffer 2'; Wheeler 5'	Report	Ferreira 11'; Glaucia 15', 17'	Stadium: Beyond Bancard Field

5 December 2025	Tigres (Mexico)	3–2	(Canada) AFC Toronto	Fort Lauderdale, Florida, United States
19:00	Sánchez 6', 22', 24'	Report	Okoronkwo 5'; Small 17'	Stadium: Beyond Bancard Field

6 December 2025	Flamengo (Brazil)	2–2 (2–1 SO)	(Canada) AFC Toronto	Fort Lauderdale, Florida, United States
11:30	Glaucia 3'; Ju Ferreira 30'	Report	Hunte 3'; Cathro 20'	Stadium: Beyond Bancard Field
	Shootout
	Fernanda (penalty scored); Cristiane (penalty scored)		Hunter (penalty scored); Okoronkwo (penalty missed)

6 December 2025	Kansas City Current (United States)	2–2 (2–1 SO)	(Mexico) Tigres	Fort Lauderdale, Florida, United States
12:30	Kerscher 10'; Wheeler 24'	Report	Sánchez 15', 18'	Stadium: Beyond Bancard Field
	Shootout
	LaBonta (penalty scored); Sentnor (penalty scored)		Périsset (penalty scored); Mayor (penalty missed)

6 December 2025	Kansas City Current (United States)	2–3	(Canada) AFC Toronto	Fort Lauderdale, Florida, United States
4:30	Pfeiffer 2', 16'	Report	Hunter 8', 12'; Okoronkwo 27'	Stadium: Beyond Bancard Field

6 December 2025	Flamengo (Brazil)	0–3	(Mexico) Tigres	Fort Lauderdale, Florida, United States
5:30		Report	Sánchez 6'; Delgado 6'; Espinoza 21'	Stadium: Beyond Bancard Field

=== Group 2 ===
Pos	Team	Pld	W	L	GF	GA	GD	Pts	Qualification
1	(United States) San Diego Wave	3	3	0	6	2	+4	3	Advanced to knockout stage
2	(Mexico) Club América	3	2	1	8	2	+6	2	Advanced to knockout stage
3	(Colombia) Deportivo Cali	3	1	2	5	6	−1	1	
4	(Uruguay) Nacional	3	0	3	3	12	−9	0	

Source: World Sevens

5 December 2025	Deportivo Cali (Colombia)	1–3	(United States) San Diego Wave	Fort Lauderdale, Florida, United States
18:00	Cobos 10'	Report	Cascarino 1'; Robbe 12', 30'	Stadium: Beyond Bancard Field

5 December 2025	Club América (Mexico)	5–2	(Uruguay) Nacional	Fort Lauderdale, Florida, United States
20:00	Camberos 3'; Gutiérrez 17', 26'; Saldívar 28', 29'	Report	Figueredo 18' (pen.); Clara 22'	Stadium: Beyond Bancard Field

6 December 2025	Nacional (Uruguay)	0–4	(Colombia) Deportivo Cali	Fort Lauderdale, Florida, United States
1:30		Report	Ibargüen 10'; Montoya 25'; Pérez 27' (o.g.); Cobos 30'	Stadium: Beyond Bancard Field

6 December 2025	San Diego Wave (United States)	0–0 (1–0 SO)	(Mexico) Club América	Fort Lauderdale, Florida, United States
2:30		Report		Stadium: Beyond Bancard Field
	Shootout
	McMahon (penalty scored)		Camberos (penalty missed)

6 December 2025	San Diego Wave (United States)	3–1	(Uruguay) Nacional	Fort Lauderdale, Florida, United States
6:30	Robbe 4'; McMahon 6' (pen.); Fusco 11'	Report	Pérez 24'	Stadium: Beyond Bancard Field

6 December 2025	Deportivo Cali (Colombia)	0–3	(Mexico) Club América	Fort Lauderdale, Florida, United States
7:30		Report	Palacios 4'; Luebbert 23'; Saldívar 29'	Stadium: Beyond Bancard Field

=== Knockout stage ===
==== Bracket ====
Semi-finals
7 December
(Mexico) Tigres UANL (a.e.t.)	2
(Mexico) Club América	1
7 December
(United States) San Diego Wave	5
(Brazil) Flamengo	1

Final
7 December
(Mexico) Tigres UANL	0
(United States) San Diego Wave	3
Third place
7 December
(Mexico) Club América	1
(Brazil) Flamengo	0

==== Semi-finals ====
7 December 2025	Tigres UANL (Mexico)	2–1 (a.e.t.)	(Mexico) Club América	Fort Lauderdale, Florida, United States
11:30 AM	Mayor 4' 33'	Report	Guerrero 13'	Stadium: Beyond Bancard Field

7 December 2025	San Diego Wave (United States)	5–1	(Brazil) Flamengo	Fort Lauderdale, Florida, United States
1:00 PM	Corley 12'; Djeni 16' (o.g.); Leon 18'; Dali 26'; Arias 27'	Report	Laysa 8'	Stadium: Beyond Bancard Field

==== Third place match ====
7 December 2025	Club América (Mexico)	1–0	(Brazil) Flamengo	Fort Lauderdale, Florida, United States
3:00 PM	Gutiérrez 22'	Report		Stadium: Beyond Bancard Field

==== Final ====
7 December 2025	Tigres UANL (Mexico)	0–3	(United States) San Diego Wave	Fort Lauderdale, Florida, United States
4:30 PM		Report	Robbe 10'; Leon 16', 17'	Stadium: Beyond Bancard Field

=== Awards ===
Award	Player (club)	Ref.
Breakout Player	(Germany) Gia Corley (San Diego Wave)	
Golden Ball	(Mexico) María Sánchez (Tigres UANL)	
Golden Boot	(Mexico) María Sánchez (Tigres UANL)	
Golden Glove	(Bosnia and Herzegovina) DiDi Haračić (San Diego Wave)	

== London 2026 ==
The third tournament took place in England and featured eight WSL clubs: Aston Villa, Chelsea, Everton, Leicester City, London City Lionesses, Tottenham Hotspur, West Ham and Manchester United.

=== Teams ===
All times are local, BST (UTC+1).

=== Group 1 ===
Pos	Team	Pld	W	L	GF	GA	GD	Pts	Qualification
1	Chelsea	3	3	0	12	6	+6	3	Advanced to knockout stage
2	Everton	3	2	1	13	7	+6	2	Advanced to knockout stage
3	Leicester City	3	1	2	5	12	−7	1	
4	London City Lionesses	3	0	3	4	9	−5	0	

Source: World Sevens

28 May 2026	Chelsea	4–3 (a.e.t.)	Everton	Brentford, London, England
15:00	Cuthbert 6'; Beever-Jones 16' 33'; Nüsken 21'	Report	Peng 6' (o.g.); Snoeijs 14'; Kitagawa 28'	Stadium: Gtech Community Stadium

28 May 2026	London City Lionesses	1–2	Leicester City	Brentford, London, England
16:00	Kennedy 29'	Report	Las 5'; Ayane 24'	Stadium: Gtech Community Stadium

28 May 2026	London City Lionesses	1–2	Everton	Brentford, London, England
19:00	Corrales 29'	Report	Mace 7'; Kramžar 27'	Stadium: Gtech Community Stadium

28 May 2026	Chelsea	3–1	Leicester City	Brentford, London, England
20:00	Cuthbert 1'; Kaptein 10'; Baltimore 22'	Report	Mouchon 6'	Stadium: Gtech Community Stadium

29 May 2026	Everton	8–2	Leicester City	Brentford, London, England
17:00	Snoeijs 2', 11'; Gago 5'; Wheeler 14'; Mace 16'; Blundell 23'; Kitagawa 24'; van Gool 30'	Report	Mouchon 6'; Draper 28'	Stadium: Gtech Community Stadium

29 May 2026	Chelsea	5–2	London City Lionesses	Brentford, London, England
18:00	Brown 8'; Baltimore 12'; Walsh 15'; Beever-Jones 26'; Rytting Kaneryd 30'	Report	Parris 4'; Sangaré 17'	Stadium: Gtech Community Stadium

=== Group 2 ===
Pos	Team	Pld	W	L	GF	GA	GD	Pts	Qualification
1	Manchester United	3	3	0	17	6	+11	3	Advanced to knockout stage
2	Aston Villa	3	2	1	9	9	0	2	Advanced to knockout stage
3	Tottenham Hotspur	3	1	2	9	15	−6	1	
4	West Ham United	3	0	3	7	12	−5	0	

Source: World Sevens

28 May 2026	Manchester United	5–4	West Ham United	Brentford, London, England
17:00	Malard 6', 8'; Terland 7', 9', 13'	Report	Morgan 10', 17'; Ueki 26'; Nyström 28'	Stadium: Gtech Community Stadium

28 May 2026	Tottenham Hotspur	3–6	Aston Villa	Brentford, London, England
18:00	Tandberg 18'; A. Nildén 19', 30'	Report	Maritz 2'; Hanson 9', 12'; Maltby 11', 26'; Jean-François 19'	Stadium: Gtech Community Stadium

29 May 2026	Manchester United	4–0	Aston Villa	Brentford, London, England
15:00	Malard 7'; Sandberg 15'; Turner 21'; Park 26'	Report		Stadium: Gtech Community Stadium

29 May 2026	Tottenham Hotspur	4–1	West Ham United	Brentford, London, England
16:00	Dennis 4'; Morris 7'; Gaupset 14'; Summanen 25'	Report	E. Cascarino 14'	Stadium: Gtech Community Stadium

29 May 2026	Aston Villa	3–2	West Ham United	Brentford, London, England
19:00	Daly 2'; Salmon 14'; Kendall 15'	Report	Zadorsky 4'; Hansen 22'	Stadium: Gtech Community Stadium

29 May 2026	Manchester United	8–2	Tottenham Hotspur	Brentford, London, England
20:00	Malard 5'; Sandberg 5'; Park 13', 17', 28'; Schüller 19'; Zigiotti Olme 22'; Le Tissier 23'	Report	Tandberg 17'; Holdt 26'	Stadium: Gtech Community Stadium

=== Knockout stage ===
==== Bracket ====
Semi-finals
30 May
Chelsea	8
Aston Villa	2
30 May
Manchester United	5
Everton	2

Final
30 May
Chelsea	6
Manchester United	5

==== Semi-finals ====
30 May 2026	Chelsea	8–2	Aston Villa	Brentford, London, England
11:00 AM	Beever-Jones 14', 17'; Ramírez 19', 24'; Kaptein 20'; Cuthbert 27'; Buurman 27', 28'	Report	Hanson 20'; Daly 26'	Stadium: Gtech Community Stadium

30 May 2026	Manchester United	5–2	Everton	Brentford, London, England
12:00 PM	Terland 7'; Awujo 11', 29'; Malard 13'; Schüller 28'	Report	Snoeijs 13'; Gago 14'	Stadium: Gtech Community Stadium

==== Final ====
30 May 2026	Chelsea	6–5	Manchester United	Brentford, London, England
2:30 PM	Nüsken 7'; Walsh 14'; Beever-Jones 13', 28', 30'; Carpenter 14'	Report	Park 6', 9'; Sandberg 10'; Malard 11'; Schüller 16'	Stadium: Gtech Community Stadium

=== Awards ===
Award	Player (club)	Ref.
Breakout Player	(England) Rachel Maltby (Aston Villa)	
Golden Ball	(England) Aggie Beever-Jones (Chelsea)	
Golden Boot	(England) Aggie Beever-Jones (Chelsea)	
Golden Glove	(Canada) Sabrina D'Angelo (Aston Villa)	

== See also ==
- 7's Football League – a seven-a-side football format in the Philippines, which has a women's division
- Queens League – a seven-a-side women's football format in Spain, with its own franchise teams
- The Soccer Tournament – a seven-a-side football format in the United States, which has featured women's and mixed teams
