= 2024–25 Manchester United W.F.C. season =

Manchester United Women
2024–25 season
- Co-chairmen: Joel and Avram Glazer
- Head coach: Marc Skinner
- Stadium: Leigh Sports Village
- Women's Super League: 3rd
- FA Cup: Runners-up
- League Cup: Quarter-finals
- Top goalscorer: League: Elisabeth Terland (10 goals); All: Elisabeth Terland (12 goals)
- Highest home attendance: 31,465 (v. Manchester City, 4 May 2025)
- Lowest home attendance: League: 3,027 (v. Brighton & Hove Albion, 26 January 2025); All: 1,745 (v. Newcastle United, 11 December 2024, League Cup)
- Average home league attendance: 7,390
- Biggest win: 7–0 v West Bromwich Albion (H) (FA Cup, 11 January 2025)
- Biggest defeat: 0–3 v Chelsea (N) (FA Cup, 18 May 2025)
Home colours	Away colours	Third colours
- All statistics correct as of 18 May 2025.

The 2024–25 season was Manchester United Women's seventh season since they were founded and their sixth in the Women's Super League, the professional top-flight women's league in England. The club also competed in the FA Cup and League Cup.

Ahead of the season, manager Marc Skinner signed a one-year contract extension. Later in the season, on 2 April 2025, he signed a further contract extension until 2027 with the option for a further year.

Following the departure of Katie Zelem in June 2024, Maya Le Tissier was named as her successor as club captain on 27 August 2024, with Ella Toone being named as vice-captain.

For the fifth consecutive season, Manchester United Women scheduled at Old Trafford. The first match of the season against West Ham United was played at the stadium on 21 September 2024 along with the team's final home match of the season against Manchester City on 4 May 2025, marking the second consecutive season United has hosted the Manchester derby at Old Trafford. A third match, against WSL debutants Crystal Palace on 16 February 2025, was initially scheduled to take place at Old Trafford, but was later moved to Leigh Sports Village instead.

== Pre-season and friendlies ==
Amid disruptions caused by ongoing redevelopment work to the men's first-team facilities at United's Carrington training base, the club confirmed United Women would spend multiple weeks of pre-season based at St George's Park in Burton upon Trent. In September, the team will spend a week at the Marbella Football Center in Spain. The pre-season fixtures were announced on 31 July 2024. The game against Liverpool scheduled for 25 August was cancelled the day before the game due to a lack of Liverpool player availability.

Date	Opponents	H / A	Result F–A	Scorers	Attendance
14 August 2024	Durham	N	3–0	Oldroyd, Terland, Toone	0 (Note: Match played behind closed doors)
25 August 2024	Liverpool	H	Cancelled		
1 September 2024	Newcastle United	H	3–1	Williams 4', Terland 48', Naalsund 50'	0
11 September 2024	Leicester City	H	2–0	Malard, Galton	0
15 September 2024	Tottenham Hotspur	N	0–1		0

== Women's Super League ==
=== Matches ===
The 2024–25 Women's Super League fixtures were released on 22 July 2024.

Date	Opponents	H / A	Result F–A	Scorers	Attendance	League position
21 September 2024	West Ham United	H	3–0	Geyse 28', Galton 45+3', Clinton 53'	8,761	2nd
29 September 2024	Everton	A	1–0	Clinton 4'	1,343	2nd
6 October 2024	Chelsea	A	Postponed due to Chelsea's UWCL group stage participation			
13 October 2024	Tottenham Hotspur	H	3–0	Terland (2) 44', 45+4', Le Tissier 59' (pen.)	4,473	3rd
19 October 2024	Brighton & Hove Albion	A	1–1	Clinton 10'	8,369	1st
3 November 2024	Arsenal	H	1–1	Malard 82'	8,348	4th
10 November 2024	Aston Villa	H	0–0		3,833	5th
17 November 2024	Leicester City	A	2–0	Terland 45+3', Bizet 81'	5,405	5th
24 November 2024 (Note: Rescheduled from 6 October 2024 due to Chelsea's UWCL group stage participation.)	Chelsea	A	0–1		4,264	5th
8 December 2024	Liverpool	H	4–0	Terland 33', Galton 34', Janssen 59', Malard 81'	4,782	4th
15 December 2024	Crystal Palace	A	1–0	Clinton 45+5'	1,773	4th
19 January 2025	Manchester City	A	4–2	Toone (3) 14', 36', 46', Galton 21'	22,497	3rd
26 January 2025	Brighton & Hove Albion	H	3–0	Toone 2', Miyazawa 11', Bizet 69'	3,027	2nd
2 February 2025	Tottenham Hotspur	A	1–0	Terland 6'	6,923	2nd
16 February 2025	Crystal Palace	H	3–1	Terland (2) 9', 64', Clinton 85'	4,761	2nd
2 March 2025	Leicester City	H	2–0	Malard 19', Galton 45+2'	3,950	2nd
14 March 2025	Liverpool	A	1–3	Le Tissier 89'	15,596	3rd
23 March 2025	Aston Villa	A	4–0	Terland (2) 22', 31', Clinton 45', Galton 64'	5,038	3rd
30 March 2025	Everton	H	2–0	Janssen 22', Clinton 47'	3,856	3rd
19 April 2025	West Ham United	A	0–0		2,315	3rd
30 April 2025 (Note: Rescheduled from 27 April 2025 due to Chelsea's participation in the UWCL semi-finals.)	Chelsea	H	0–1		4,029	3rd
4 May 2025	Manchester City	H	2–2	Clinton 45', Malard 68'	31,465	3rd
10 May 2025	Arsenal	A	3–4	Toone 13', Terland 70', Le Tissier 76' (pen.)	46,603	3rd

=== Table ===
Pos	Team	Pld	W	D	L	GF	GA	GD	Pts	Qualification or relegation
1	Chelsea (C)	22	19	3	0	56	13	+43	60	Qualification for the Champions League league stage (Note: Arsenal qualified for the Champions League league phase as the 2024–25 UEFA Women's Champions League winners.)
2	Arsenal	22	15	3	4	62	26	+36	48	Qualification for the Champions League league stage
3	Manchester United	22	13	5	4	41	16	+25	44	Qualification for the Champions League second qualifying round
4	Manchester City	22	13	4	5	49	28	+21	43	
5	Brighton & Hove Albion	22	8	4	10	35	41	−6	28	

Source: The Football Association
Rules for classification: 1) Points; 2) Goal difference; 3) Number of goals scored.
(C) Champions

== Women's FA Cup ==
As a member of the first tier, United entered the FA Cup in the fourth round proper. They entered the FA Cup as defending champions.

Date	Round	Opponents	H / A	Result F–A	Scorers	Attendance
11 January 2025	Round 4	West Bromwich Albion	H	7–0	Malard 23', Bizet (3) 77', (Note: The goal scored in the 77th minute was initially credited to Williams, including on United's match report. However, the goal has since been credited to Bizet.) 89', 90+7', Williams (2) 79', 90+2', Toone 84'	2,313
8 February 2025	Round 5	Wolverhampton Wanderers	A	6–0	Terland 26', Galton 36', Mannion 52', Toone 54', Griffiths (2) 88', 90+5'	5,008
8 March 2025	Quarter-final	Sunderland	H	3–1	Galton 7', Le Tissier 45+2', Toone 90+1'	3,051
13 April 2025	Semi-final	Manchester City	A	2–0	Bizet 6', Clinton 22'	5,600
18 May 2025	Final	Chelsea	N	0–3		74,412

== Women's League Cup ==
=== Group stage ===
As a team not qualified for the group stage of the Champions League, Manchester United entered the League Cup at the group stage. With the draw split regionally, United were drawn into Group A of the northern section along with WSL clubs Everton and Liverpool, and Newcastle United of the Championship.

Date	Opponents	H / A	Result F–A	Scorers	Attendance	Group position
2 October 2024	Liverpool	H	2–0	Malard 9', Williams 67'	2,568	1st
20 November 2024 (Note: This match, originally scheduled for 22 November 2024, was moved forward due to the rescheduling of Manchester United's WSL match against Chelsea away.)	Everton	A	2–0	Brosnan 15' (o.g.), Le Tissier 77'	789	1st
11 December 2024	Newcastle United	H	5–3	Cataldo 9' (o.g.), Watson 24', Williams 68', George 83', Terland 88'	1,745	1st

Pos	Team	Pld	W	PW	PL	L	GF	GA	GD	Pts	Qualification	MUN	LIV	EVE	NUN
1	Manchester United	3	3	0	0	0	9	3	+6	9	Advanced to knock-out stage	—	2–0	–	5–3
2	Liverpool	3	2	0	0	1	10	3	+7	6		–	—	4–0	–
3	Everton	3	0	1	0	2	1	7	−6	2		0–2	–	—	–
4	Newcastle United	3	0	0	1	2	5	12	−7	1		–	1–6	1–1	—

Updated to match(es) played on 24 November 2024. Source: Women's League Cup
Rules for classification: 1) Points; 2) Goal difference; 3) Number of goals scored; 4) Number of wins; 5) Head-to-head record

=== Knockout phase ===
The draw for the knockout phase was made on 16 December 2024, with United being drawn at home against Manchester City in the quarter-finals.

Date	Round	Opponents	H / A	Result F–A	Scorers	Attendance
22 January 2025	Quarter-final	Manchester City	H	1–2	Turner 35'	3,011

== World Sevens Football ==
Manchester United contested the inaugural women's seven-a-side football tournament between 21 and 23 May. The tournament was held in Estoril, Portugal, and featured eight clubs split between two groups. The top two teams from each group progressed to the knockout stage. United were awarded £739K (US$1m) as runners up of the tournament, after losing 2–1 to Bayern Munich in the final.

Group stage

Pos	Team	Pld	W	D	L	GF	GA	GD	Pts	Qualification
1	(England) Manchester United	3	3	0	0	8	5	+3	3	Advanced to knockout stage
2	(France) Paris Saint-Germain	3	2	0	1	6	4	+2	2	Advanced to knockout stage
3	(Italy) AS Roma	3	1	0	2	5	7	−2	1	
4	(Portugal) Benfica	3	0	0	3	4	7	−3	0	

Updated to match(es) played on 21 May 2025. Source: World Sevens

Date	Opponents	H / A	Result F–A	Scorers	Attendance
21 May 2025	AS Roma	N	3–2	Bizet 12', Toone 14', Clinton 20'	
22 May 2025	Benfica	N	3–1	Bizet 2', Awujo (2) 11', 18'	
22 May 2025	Paris Saint-Germain	N	2–2 (7–6 p)	Le Tissier 5', Simpson 20'	

Knockout stage

Date	Round	Opponents	H / A	Result F–A	Scorers	Attendance
23 May 2025	Semi-final	Manchester City	N	2–0	Malard 4', George 25'	
23 May 2025	Final	Bayern Munich	N	1–2	Awujo 14'	

== Squad statistics ==
As of 18 May 2025
Numbers in brackets denote appearances as substitute.
Key to positions: GK – Goalkeeper; DF – Defender; MF – Midfielder; FW – Forward

No.	Pos.	Name	League		FA Cup		League Cup		Total		Discipline	
No.	Pos.	Name	Apps	Goals	Apps	Goals	Apps	Goals	Apps	Goals	Yellow card	Red card
1	GK	(England) Kayla Rendell	0	0	0	0	0	0	0	0	0	0
2	DF	(Sweden) Anna Sandberg	2(12)	0	1(4)	0	3	0	6(16)	0	2	0
3	DF	(England) Gabby George	18(1)	0	4(1)	0	1(1)	1	23(3)	1	7	0
4	DF	(England) Maya Le Tissier (c)	22	3	5	1	4	1	31	5	5	0
5	DF	(Republic of Ireland) Aoife Mannion	2(11)	0	3(2)	1	2	0	7(13)	1	2	1
6	DF	(England) Hannah Blundell	0	0	0	0	0	0	0	0	0	0
7	MF	(England) Ella Toone	17(1)	5	3(2)	3	0(1)	0	20(4)	8	1	0
8	MF	(England) Grace Clinton	19(2)	8	4	1	1(2)	0	24(4)	9	6	0
9	FW	(France) Melvine Malard	4(13)	4	3(2)	1	4	1	11(15)	6	3	0
11	FW	(England) Leah Galton	17(1)	5	5	2	1(3)	0	23(4)	7	2	0
12	MF	(Wales) Hayley Ladd	0(3)	0	0	0	3	0	3(3)	0	0	0
13	MF	(Canada) Simi Awujo	2(10)	0	0(1)	0	3(1)	0	5(12)	0	1	0
14	DF	(Canada) Jayde Riviere	17(1)	0	2	0	1(1)	0	20(2)	0	1	0
15	FW	(Norway) Celin Bizet	17(5)	2	3(1)	4	1(2)	0	21(8)	6	1	0
16	MF	(Norway) Lisa Naalsund	5(3)	0	0(2)	0	0(1)	0	5(6)	0	1	0
17	DF	(Netherlands) Dominique Janssen	19(2)	2	2(2)	0	1(3)	0	22(7)	2	2	0
19	FW	(Norway) Elisabeth Terland	18(2)	10	4	1	0(3)	1	22(5)	12	0	0
20	MF	(Japan) Hinata Miyazawa	13(6)	1	5	0	3(1)	0	21(7)	1	2	0
21	DF	(England) Millie Turner	21	0	5	0	4	1	30	1	2	0
23	FW	(Brazil) Geyse	6(3)	1	1(1)	0	2	0	9(4)	1	3	0
25	DF	(England) Evie Rabjohn	0	0	0	0	0	0	0	0	0	0
28	FW	(England) Rachel Williams	1(14)	0	0(4)	2	4	2	5(18)	4	1	0
34	MF	(Scotland) Emma Watson	0(1)	0	0	0	2	1	2(1)	1	1	0
36	FW	(England) Alyssa Aherne	0	0	0	0	0	0	0	0	0	0
37	FW	(England) Keira Barry	0	0	0	0	0	0	0	0	0	0
38	DF	(England) Jess Simpson	0	0	0	0	0(1)	0	0(1)	0	0	0
39	GK	(Wales) Safia Middleton-Patel	0	0	0	0	1	0	1	0	0	0
42	FW	(England) Jessica Anderson	0	0	0	0	0	0	0	0	0	0
48	MF	(Wales) Mared Griffiths	0	0	0(1)	2	0	0	0(1)	2	0	0
50	MF	(Scotland) Amelia Oldroyd	0	0	0	0	0	0	0	0	0	0
55	DF	(England) Lucy Newell	0	0	0	0	0	0	0	0	0	0
59	MF	(England) Tamira Livingston	0	0	0	0	0	0	0	0	0	0
62	DF	(Wales) Scarlett Hill	0	0	0	0	0	0	0	0	0	0
91	GK	(United States) Phallon Tullis-Joyce	22	0	5	0	3	0	30	0	2	0
Own goals			—	0	—	0	—	2	—	2	—	—

== Transfers ==
=== In ===
Date	Pos.	Name	From	Ref.
1 July 2024 (Note: Deal agreed 15 June 2024)	MF	(Wales) Sienna Jones	(England) Bolton Wanderers	
2 July 2024	DF	(Netherlands) Dominique Janssen	(Germany) VfL Wolfsburg	
12 July 2024	FW	(France) Melvine Malard	(France) Lyon	
17 July 2024	FW	(Norway) Elisabeth Terland	(England) Brighton & Hove Albion	
2 August 2024	DF	(Sweden) Anna Sandberg	(Sweden) BK Häcken	
9 August 2024	MF	(Canada) Simi Awujo	(United States) USC Trojans	
4 September 2024	FW	(Norway) Celin Bizet	(England) Tottenham Hotspur	
11 January 2025	GK	(England) Kayla Rendell	(England) Southampton	

=== Out ===
Date	Pos.	Name	To	Ref.
30 June 2024	GK	(England) Mary Earps	(France) Paris Saint-Germain (Note: Released, joined Paris Saint-Germain on 1 July 2024.)	
30 June 2024	FW	(Spain) Lucía García	(Mexico) Monterrey (Note: Released, joined Monterrey on 1 July 2024)	
30 June 2024	MF	(England) Katie Zelem	(United States) Angel City FC (Note: Released, joined Angel City on 12 August 2024)	
1 July 2024	FW	(England) Eleanor Ashton	(United States) Coastal Carolina Chanticleers	
1 July 2024	FW	(Wales) Lois Cartmell	(England) Liverpool	
1 July 2024	DF	(Wales) Mayzee Davies	(England) Manchester City	
1 July 2024	GK	(England) Jennifer Handy	(United States) Louisiana–Monroe Warhawks	
1 July 2024	FW	(England) Megan Sofield	(United States) Arizona State Sun Devils	
17 July 2024	FW	(United Arab Emirates) Fay Al-Qaimi	(England) Halifax	
18 July 2024	MF	(Spain) Irene Guerrero	(Mexico) Club América	
14 August 2024	MF	(Republic of Ireland) Layla Proctor	(England) Lewes	
16 August 2024	DF	(Wales) Gemma Evans	(England) Liverpool	
18 August 2024	MF	(Wales) Bella Reidford	(England) Burnley	
13 September 2024	FW	(England) Nikita Parris	(England) Brighton & Hove Albion	
8 January 2025	MF	(Wales) Hayley Ladd	(England) Everton	
20 February 2025	DF	(England) Zaiba Ishaque	(United States) Wake Forest Demon Deacons	
10 March 2025	MF	(England) Anna Fletcher	(United States) Rhode Island Rams	
13 March 2025	DF	(England) Ruby Johnson	(United States) Marshall Thundering Herd	

=== Loans out ===
Date from	Date to	Pos.	Name	To	Ref.
8 August 2024	30 June 2025	MF	(England) Holly Deering (Note: Dual registration)	(England) Liverpool Feds	
8 August 2024	30 June 2025	GK	(England) Kacey Bolton-Woollam	(England) Huddersfield Town	
19 August 2024	30 June 2025	FW	(Wales) Olivia Francis	(England) Liverpool Feds	
13 September 2024	30 June 2025	FW	(England) Alyssa Aherne	(England) Sheffield United	
7 January 2025	30 June 2025	DF	(England) Jess Simpson	(England) Bristol City	
7 January 2025	30 June 2025	MF	(Scotland) Emma Watson	(England) Everton	
10 January 2025	30 June 2025	DF	(England) Lucy Newell	(England) Blackburn Rovers	
19 January 2025	30 June 2025	MF	(England) Sienna Limbert	(England) Halifax	
26 January 2025	30 June 2025	MF	(England) Anna Fletcher	(England) Stockport County	
28 January 2025	30 June 2025	MF	(Scotland) Amelia Oldroyd	(England) Burnley	
30 January 2025	30 June 2025	DF	(England) Amelia Freeman	(England) Cheadle Town	
13 February 2025	30 June 2025	MF	(England) Ellie Adams	(England) AFC Fylde	
23 February 2025	30 June 2025	GK	(England) Millie Crook	(England) AFC Fylde	
22 March 2025	30 June 2025	DF	(England) Lucy Crook	(England) Liverpool Feds	
24 March 2025	16 November 2025	FW	(Brazil) Geyse	(United States) Gotham FC	
