= 2025–26 Manchester United W.F.C. season =

Manchester United Women
2025–26 season
- Co-chairmen: Joel and Avram Glazer
- Head coach: Marc Skinner
- Stadium: Leigh Sports Village
- Women's Super League: 4th
- FA Cup: Fifth round
- League Cup: Runners-up
- Champions League: Quarter-finals
- Top goalscorer: League: Jess Park; Melvine Malard; Elisabeth Terland (6 goals each); All: Elisabeth Terland (15 goals)
Home colours	Away colours	Third colours

The 2025–26 season was Manchester United Women's eighth season since they were founded and their seventh in the Women's Super League, the professional top-flight women's league in England. The club also competed in the FA Cup, the League Cup and the UEFA Women's Champions League.

For the sixth consecutive season, Manchester United Women scheduled matches at Old Trafford. In the WSL, the match against Manchester City was held at the stadium on 28 March 2026, marking the third consecutive season in which it has hosted the Manchester derby. In addition, United played two Champions League matches at Old Trafford: the league phase match against Paris Saint-Germain on 12 November 2025 and the first leg of the quarter-finals against Bayern Munich on 25 March 2026. This marked the first time United has played more than two matches at Old Trafford during a season. A second WSL match, against Aston Villa on 8 November 2025, was initially scheduled to take place at Old Trafford, but was later moved to Leigh Sports Village instead.

== Pre-season and friendlies ==
Manchester United's pre-season fixtures were announced on 25 July 2025.

Date	Opponents	H / A	Result F–A	Scorers	Attendance
3 August 2025	Aston Villa	H	2–0	Galton, George	0 (Note: Match played behind closed doors)
9 August 2025	Manchester City	A	0–0		0
16 August 2025	Real Betis	N	8–0	Sandberg 1', Bizet (2) 4', 32', Malard (2) 19', 30', Terland (2) 44', 45', Anderson 88'	0
20 August 2025	Liverpool	H	2–2	Awujo 5', Toone 90'	

== Women's Super League ==
The 2026–27 home kit was used for the final match.

The 2025–26 Women's Super League fixtures were announced on 25 July 2025.

Date	Opponents	H / A	Result F–A	Scorers	Attendance	League position
7 September 2025	Leicester City	H	4–0	Toone 13', Terland 25', Malard (2) 73', 87'	4,325	1st
14 September 2025	London City Lionesses	A	5–1	Le Tissier 3' (pen.), Riviere 33', Malard (2) 47', 50', Park 87'	2,800	1st
21 September 2025	Arsenal	H	0–0		8,665	2nd
28 September 2025	Liverpool	A	2–0	Miyazawa 4', Toone 45+2'	3,022	2nd
4 October 2025	Chelsea	H	1–1	Sandberg 20'	5,105	4th
12 October 2025	Everton	A	4–1	Malard 62', Kitagawa 70' (o.g.), Park (2) 84', 89'	18,154	3rd
2 November 2025	Brighton & Hove Albion	A	3–2	Terland 45', Park 58', Naalsund 89'	3,363	3rd
8 November 2025	Aston Villa	H	0–1		3,434	3rd
16 November 2025	Manchester City	A	0–3		17,520	3rd
6 December 2025	West Ham United	H	2–1	Terland 37', Janssen 71'	2,705	3rd
14 December 2025	Tottenham Hotspur	H	3–3	Toone 74', Rolfö (2) 82', 90+4'	3,148	4th
10 January 2026	Arsenal	A	0–0		37,627	5th
25 January 2026	Aston Villa	A	4–1	Zigiotti Olme 35', Terland 71', Park 75', Lundkvist 79'	4,501	4th
1 February 2026	Liverpool	H	3–1	Naalsund (2) 52', 60', Rolfö 87'	4,502	2nd
8 February 2026	Leicester City	A	2–0	Zigiotti Olme 13', Terland 88'	5,474	2nd
15 February 2026	London City Lionesses	H	2–1	Park 30', Turner 79'	3,763	2nd
18 March 2026	West Ham United	A	0–0		1,097	3rd
21 March 2026	Everton	H	2–1	Terland 38', Malard 90+4'	3,261	2nd
29 March 2026	Manchester City	H	0–3		24,983	4th
26 April 2026	Tottenham Hotspur	A	0–0		7,310	3rd
2 May 2026	Brighton & Hove Albion	H	1–1	Schüller 90+4'	4,067	4th
16 May 2026	Chelsea	A	0–1			4th

=== Table ===
Pos	Team	Pld	W	D	L	GF	GA	GD	Pts	Qualification or relegation
2	Arsenal	22	15	6	1	53	14	+39	51	Qualification for the Champions League league phase
3	Chelsea	22	15	4	3	44	20	+24	49	Qualification for the Champions League third qualifying round
4	Manchester United	22	11	7	4	38	22	+16	40	
5	Tottenham Hotspur	22	11	3	8	35	38	−3	36	
6	London City Lionesses	22	8	3	11	28	35	−7	27	

Source: WSL League Table
Rules for classification: 1) Points; 2) Goal difference; 3) Number of goals scored.

== Women's FA Cup ==
As a member of the first tier, United entered the FA Cup in the fourth round proper.

Date	Round	Opponents	H / A	Result F–A	Scorers	Attendance
18 January 2026	Round 4	Burnley	H	5–0	Le Tissier 2', Zigiotti Olme 21', Awujo 35', Schüller 47', Drury 76'	2,835
22 February 2026	Round 5	Chelsea	A	1–2 (a.e.t.)	Awujo 81'	2,964

== Women's League Cup ==
=== Knockout phase ===
As Manchester United qualified for the league phase of the UEFA Women's Champions League, they entered the League Cup in the quarter-finals. The draw for the knockout phase was made on 25 November 2025, with United being drawn at home against Tottenham Hotspur.

Date	Round	Opponents	H / A	Result F–A	Scorers	Attendance
21 December 2025	Quarter-final	Tottenham Hotspur	H	2–1	Park 51', Rolfö 86'	2,027
21 January 2026	Semi-finals	Arsenal	A	1–0	Terland 45+2'	2,418
15 March 2026	Final	Chelsea	N	0–2		21,619

== UEFA Women's Champions League ==
=== Qualifying rounds ===
Having finished third in the 2024–25 Women's Super League, Manchester United entered the Champions League in the second qualifying round. The draw took place on 24 June 2025 with United being drawn against PSV Eindhoven, followed by Hammarby IF or Metalist Kharkiv in either the final or third place play-off of their group. All games in this round took place at Hammarby's home ground in Stockholm.

For the third qualifying round, United were drawn against Brann. A 3–1 win on aggregate saw the team qualify for the main phase of the tournament for the first time in their history.

Date	Round	Opponents	H / A	Result F–A	Scorers	Attendance
27 August 2025	Second qualifying round Semi-final	PSV Eindhoven	N	4–0	Terland (3) 7', 53', 63', Bizet 32'	370
30 August 2025	Second qualifying round Final	Hammarby IF	A	1–0	Terland 61'	5,546
11 September 2025	Third qualifying round First leg	Brann	A	0–1		16,019
18 September 2025	Third qualifying round Second leg	Brann	H	3–0	Terland (3) 9', 13', 62'	2,972

=== League phase ===
The draw for the league phase took place on 19 September, with dates for each fixture being confirmed the following day.

Date	Opponents	H / A	Result F–A	Scorers	Attendance	League position
8 October 2025	Vålerenga	H	1–0	Le Tissier 31' (pen.)	2,204	7th
16 October 2025	Atlético Madrid	A	1–0	Rolfö 24'	1,651	5th
12 November 2025	Paris Saint-Germain	H	2–1	Malard 31', Rolfö 58'	14,667	3rd
19 November 2025	VfL Wolfsburg	A	2–5	Rolfö 14', Malard 45+2'	3,817	4th
10 December 2025	Lyon	H	0–3		2,318	9th
17 December 2025	Juventus	A	1–0	Park 18'	6,641	6th

Pos	Team	Pld	W	D	L	GF	GA	GD	Pts	Qualification
4	(German Football Association) Bayern Munich	6	4	1	1	14	13	+1	13	Advance to the quarter-finals (seeded)
5	(The Football Association) Arsenal	6	4	0	2	11	6	+5	12	Advance to the knockout phase play-offs (seeded)
6	(The Football Association) Manchester United	6	4	0	2	7	9	−2	12	Advance to the knockout phase play-offs (seeded)
7	(Royal Spanish Football Federation) Real Madrid	6	3	2	1	13	7	+6	11	Advance to the knockout phase play-offs (seeded)
8	(Italian Football Federation) Juventus	6	3	1	2	13	8	+5	10	Advance to the knockout phase play-offs (seeded)

Source: UEFA
Rules for classification: League phase tiebreakers

=== Knockout phase ===
Date	Round	Opponents	H / A	Result F–A	Scorers	Attendance
12 February 2026	Knockout phase play-offs First leg	Atlético Madrid	A	3–0	Terland 3', Malard 39', Zigiotti Olme 81'	1,415
19 February 2026	Knockout phase play-offs Second leg	Atlético Madrid	H	2–0	Zigiotti Olme 28', Park 41'	4,225
25 March 2026	Quarter-final; First leg	Bayern Munich	H	2–3	Le Tissier 24' (pen.), Lundkvist 76'	7,513
1 April 2026	Quarter-final; Second leg	Bayern Munich	A	1–2	Malard 11'	25,000

== World Sevens Football ==
Manchester United contested the third women's seven-a-side football tournament between 28 and 30 May. The tournament was held at the Brentford Community Stadium in West London, and featured eight WSL clubs split between two groups. The top two teams from each group progressed to the knockout stage.

Group stage

Pos	Team	Pld	W	D	L	GF	GA	GD	Pts	Qualification
1	Manchester United	3	3	0	0	17	6	+11	3	Advanced to knockout stage
2	Aston Villa	3	2	0	1	9	9	0	2	Advanced to knockout stage
3	Tottenham Hotspur	3	1	0	2	9	15	−6	1	
4	West Ham United	3	0	0	3	7	12	−5	0	

Updated to match(es) played on 29 May 2026. Source: World Sevens

Date	Opponents	H / A	Result F–A	Scorers	Attendance
28 May 2026	West Ham United	N	5–4	Malard (2) 6', 8', Terland (3) 7', 9', 13'	
29 May 2026	Aston Villa	N	4–0	Malard 7', Sandberg 15', Turner 21', Park 26'	
29 May 2026	Tottenham Hotspur	N	8–2	Malard 5', Sandberg 5', Park (3) 13', 17', 28', Schüller 19', Zigiotti Olme 22', Le Tissier 23'	

Knockout stage

Date	Round	Opponents	H / A	Result F–A	Scorers	Attendance
30 May 2026	Semi-final	Everton	N	5–2	Terland 7', Awujo (2) 11', 29', Malard 13', Schüller 28'	
30 May 2026	Final	Chelsea	N	5–6	Park (2) 6', 9', Sandberg 10', Malard 11', Schüller 16'	

== Squad statistics ==
As of 16 May 2026
Numbers in brackets denote appearances as substitute.
Key to positions: GK – Goalkeeper; DF – Defender; MF – Midfielder; FW – Forward

No.	Pos.	Name	League		FA Cup		League Cup		Europe		Total		Discipline	
No.	Pos.	Name	Apps	Goals	Apps	Goals	Apps	Goals	Apps	Goals	Apps	Goals	Yellow card	Red card
1	GK	(England) Kayla Rendell	0	0	0	0	0	0	0	0	0	0	0	0
2	DF	(Sweden) Anna Sandberg	15(2)	1	0(1)	0	2	0	11	0	28(3)	1	4	0
3	DF	(England) Gabby George	4(9)	0	0(1)	0	0	0	3(7)	0	7(17)	0	2	0
4	DF	(England) Maya Le Tissier (c)	22	1	2	1	3	0	14	2	41	4	5	0
5	DF	(Sweden) Hanna Lundkvist	5(6)	1	2	0	1(1)	0	3	1	11(7)	2	3	0
6	DF	(England) Hannah Blundell	0(3)	0	0	0	1	0	0	0	1(3)	0	0	0
7	MF	(England) Ella Toone	13(1)	3	0	0	1	0	7(3)	0	21(4)	3	1	0
8	MF	(England) Jess Park	19(3)	6	2	0	3	1	9(2)	2	33(5)	9	1	0
9	FW	(France) Melvine Malard	16(5)	6	2	0	1(2)	0	13(1)	4	32(8)	10	4	0
10	FW	(Norway) Elisabeth Terland	13(5)	6	0(2)	0	3	1	8(1)	8	24(8)	15	1	0
11	FW	(England) Leah Galton	1(4)	0	0	0	0	0	0(5)	0	1(9)	0	0	0
12	FW	(Sweden) Fridolina Rolfö	11(8)	3	0	0	1(1)	1	7(2)	3	19(11)	7	0	0
13	MF	(Canada) Simi Awujo	4(7)	0	1(1)	2	1(2)	0	4(5)	0	10(15)	2	0	0
14	DF	(Canada) Jayde Riviere	18(1)	1	0	0	2	0	11(1)	0	31(2)	1	7	1
15	FW	(Norway) Celin Bizet Dønnum	3(2)	0	0	0	0	0	2(1)	1	5(3)	1	1	0
16	MF	(Norway) Lisa Naalsund	9(7)	3	2	0	1(2)	0	6(7)	0	18(16)	3	2	0
17	DF	(Netherlands) Dominique Janssen	15(3)	1	2	0	3	0	10(1)	0	30(4)	1	3	1
18	MF	(Sweden) Julia Zigiotti Olme	17(3)	2	2	1	3	0	11(3)	2	33(6)	5	7	0
19	FW	(Sweden) Ellen Wangerheim	3(5)	0	1(1)	0	2	0	1(1)	0	7(7)	0	1	0
20	MF	(Japan) Hinata Miyazawa	20	1	1(1)	0	2	0	14	0	37(1)	1	0	0
21	DF	(England) Millie Turner	6(2)	1	2	0	0	0	3(2)	0	11(4)	1	0	0
23	FW	(Brazil) Geyse	0	0	0	0	0	0	0	0	0	0	0	0
24	FW	(Germany) Lea Schüller	6(5)	1	1(1)	1	0(2)	0	2(1)	0	9(9)	2	1	0
25	DF	(England) Evie Rabjohn	0	0	0	0	0	0	0	0	0	0	0	0
28	FW	(England) Rachel Williams	0(6)	0	0	0	0	0	1(4)	0	1(10)	0	0	0
34	MF	(Scotland) Emma Watson	0	0	0	0	0	0	0	0	0	0	0	0
35	DF	(England) Lucy Newell	0	0	0	0	0	0	0	0	0	0	0	0
36	MF	(Wales) Mared Griffiths	0	0	0	0	0	0	0	0	0	0	0	0
37	FW	(England) Keira Barry	0	0	0	0	0	0	0(1)	0	0(1)	0	0	0
38	DF	(England) Jess Simpson	0	0	0	0	0	0	0	0	0	0	0	0
39	GK	(Wales) Safia Middleton-Patel	1	0	0	0	0	0	2	0	3	0	0	0
47	MF	(England) Jessica Anderson	0(1)	0	0	0	0	0	0(1)	0	0(2)	0	0	0
48	MF	(England) Sienna Wareing	0	0	0	0	0	0	0	0	0	0	0	0
52	DF	(Wales) Scarlett Hill	0	0	0	0	0	0	0	0	0	0	0	0
57	FW	(England) Layla Drury	0(5)	0	0(2)	1	0	0	0	0	0(7)	1	0	0
91	GK	(United States) Phallon Tullis-Joyce	21	0	2	0	3	0	12	0	38	0	5	0
Own goals			—	1	—	0	—	0	—	0	—	1	—	—

== Transfers ==
=== In ===
Date	Pos.	Name	From	Ref.
17 June 2025	DF	(England) Caitlin Driver	(England) Blackburn Rovers	
17 June 2025	MF	(England) Ava Haigh	(England) Blackburn Rovers	
31 July 2025	MF	(England) Issy Plano	(England) Blackburn Rovers	
31 July 2025	MF	(Sweden) Julia Zigiotti Olme	(Germany) Bayern Munich	
15 August 2025	FW	(Sweden) Fridolina Rolfö	(Spain) Barcelona	
4 September 2025	MF	(England) Jess Park	(England) Manchester City	
1 January 2026	DF	(Sweden) Hanna Lundkvist	(United States) San Diego Wave (Note: Deal agreed 27 December 2025)	
1 January 2026	FW	(Germany) Lea Schüller	(Germany) Bayern Munich (Note: Deal agreed 29 December 2025)	
16 January 2026	FW	(Sweden) Ellen Wangerheim	(Sweden) Hammarby IF	

=== Out ===
Date	Pos.	Name	To	Ref.
30 June 2025	FW	(England) Alyssa Aherne	(England) Sheffield United (Note: Released, joined Sheffield United on 22 July 2025.)	
30 June 2025	DF	(Republic of Ireland) Aoife Mannion	(England) Newcastle United (Note: Released, joined Newcastle United on 18 July 2025.)	
30 June 2025	MF	(England) Layla Grey	(England) Blackburn Rovers (Note: Released, joined Blackburn Rovers on 12 August 2025.)	
30 June 2025	MF	(Scotland) Amelia Oldroyd	(England) Manchester City (Note: Released, joined Manchester City on 22 August 2025.)	
30 June 2025	FW	(England) Aoife Farrall	(United States) Eastern Florida Titans (Note: Released, joined Eastern Florida Titans on 4 August 2025.)	
30 June 2025	MF	(England) Ellie Adams	(England) AFC Fylde	
30 June 2025	DF	(England) Phoebe Chadwick	(United States) Harvard Crimson	
30 June 2025	FW	(England) Penny Hallas	(England) Manchester City (Note: Released, joined Manchester City on 12 July 2025.)	
15 July 2025	MF	(England) Holly Deering	(England) Stoke City	
20 July 2025	DF	(England) Lucy Crook	(England) Liverpool Feds	
23 July 2025	DF	(England) Olivia Moulton	(United States) Central Michigan Chippewas	
10 August 2025	DF	(England) Amelia Freeman	(England) Newcastle United	
15 August 2025	FW	(Wales) Olivia Francis	(England) Plymouth Argyle	
15 August 2025	DF	(England) Ruby Scott	(England) Stoke City	
4 September 2025	MF	(England) Grace Clinton	(England) Manchester City	
2 November 2025	MF	(England) Sienna Limbert	(England) Bolton	
13 January 2026	FW	(Brazil) Geyse	(Mexico) Club América	
15 January 2026	FW	(England) Rachel Williams	(England) Leicester City	
4 February 2026	FW	(England) Keira Barry	(United States) Bay FC	
6 February 2026	DF	(England) Evie Rabjohn	(Scotland) Celtic	
11 February 2026	DF	(England) Holly Minshull	(United States) James Madison Dukes (Note: will join JMU upcoming fall season.)	
11 February 2026	MF	(England) Sienna Wareing	(United States) Auburn Tigers (Note: will join the Tigers’ squad in time to compete in the upcoming fall season, but later she declining it.)	
19 February 2026	GK	(England) Kacey Bolton-Woollam	(England) Huddersfield Town	

=== Loan out ===
Date from	Date to	Pos.	Name	To	Ref.
16 July 2025	30 June 2026	DF	(England) Jess Simpson	(England) Southampton	
13 August 2025	19 January 2026	GK	(England) Kacey Bolton-Woollam	(England) York City	
18 August 2025	30 June 2026	GK	(Wales) Poppy Lyons-Walker (Note: Dual registration)	(England) FC United of Manchester	
21 August 2025	14 January 2026	DF	(England) Lucy Newell	(England) Birmingham City	
22 August 2025	12 January 2026	MF	(Scotland) Emma Watson	(England) Crystal Palace	
3 September 2025	31 December 2025	FW	(England) Keira Barry	(England) Sunderland	
4 September 2025	6 January 2026	DF	(England) Evie Rabjohn	(England) Sunderland	
2 November 2025	30 June 2026	MF	(England) Jess Nwachukwu	(England) Bolton Wanderers	
9 January 2026	30 June 2026	DF	(England) Hannah Blundell	(England) Everton	
23 January 2026	30 June 2026	DF	(England) Lucy Newell	(England) Crystal Palace	
23 January 2026	30 June 2026	MF	(England) Sienna Wareing	(England) Liverpool Feds	
24 January 2026	30 June 2026	MF	(Scotland) Emma Watson	(Mexico) Tigres UANL	
3 February 2026	30 June 2026	MF	(Wales) Mared Griffiths	(England) Sunderland	
6 February 2026	30 June 2026	DF	(Wales) Scarlett Hill	(England) Sheffield United	
19 February 2026	30 June 2026	MF	(England) Tamira Livingston	(England) Huddersfield Town	
