= Jayde Riviere =

Canadian soccer player (born 2001)

- Riviere with Manchester United in 2025

Personal information
- Full name: Jayde Yuk Fun Riviere
- Date of birth: January 22, 2001 (age 25)
- Place of birth: Markham, Ontario, Canada
- Height: 1.64 m (5 ft 5 in)
- Position: Right-back

Team information
- Current team: Manchester United
- Number: 14

Youth career
- 2005: West Rouge SC
- 2005–2014: Pickering SC
- 2014–2017: Markham SC
- 2017–2019: Vancouver Whitecaps REX

College career
Years	Team	Apps	(Gls)
2019–2022	Michigan Wolverines	47	(1)

Senior career*
Years	Team	Apps	(Gls)
2022	AFC Ann Arbor	4	(0)
2023–	Manchester United	58	(1)

International career^{‡}
2016	Canada U15	7	(4)
2016–2018	Canada U17	16	(2)
2018	Canada U20	5	(0)
2017–	Canada	56	(1)
Medal record
Women's soccer
Representing Canada
Olympic Games
Gold medal – first place	2020 Tokyo	Team
- * Club domestic league appearances and goals as of November 22, 2026 ‡ National team caps and goals as of April 18, 2026

Jayde Yuk Fun Riviere (Note: "Yuk Fun", pronounced [jʊk̚˨ fɐn˥], is derived from Cantonese 玉芬, while "Riviere" is a variant of the French surname "Rivière", pronounced [ʁivjɛʁ] or, in Canadian French, [ʁivjaɛ̯ʁ].) (born January 22, 2001) is a Canadian professional soccer player who plays as a right-back for Women's Super League club Manchester United and the Canada national team.

Riviere played college soccer at the University of Michigan before signing her first professional contract with Manchester United in 2023. She represented Canada at multiple youth levels before earning her first senior cap in 2017. In 2021, she won a gold medal at the 2020 Summer Olympics in Tokyo, Japan.

== Early life ==
Born in Markham, Ontario, Riviere was first taught to play soccer by her father when she was three. She started playing club soccer for West Rouge SC at the age of four, later representing Pickering SC before moving to Markham SC aged 13. She attended Bill Crothers Secondary School where she also played volleyball, flag football and track and field, and was named Female Athlete of the Year after scoring 50 goals in just 20 league games in her only year of high school soccer before joining the Ontario REX program. In August 2017, Riviere moved cross country to Burnaby, British Columbia, to join the residency program at the Vancouver Whitecaps Super REX Academy.

== College career ==
Riviere verbally committed to playing college soccer for the Michigan Wolverines at the University of Michigan in 2014. In total, she received 28 full scholarship offers before she enrolled at the Michigan School of Kinesiology in the fall of 2019. She also rejected offers to play professionally in order to attend Michigan. She made her collegiate debut starting in the season opener on August 22, 2019, a 5–0 win over Marshall Thundering Herd. She scored her first and only collegiate goal on November 8, 2019, scoring the overtime winner in a 2–1 victory against the Rutgers Scarlet Knights in the 2019 Big Ten women's soccer tournament semi-final. In her freshman season, she was named to the Big Ten All-Freshman Team. In 2021, she made a career-high 22 appearances on the season and helped lead Michigan to the 2021 Big Ten women's soccer tournament title, the third in team history and first since 1999, as well as a program-tying best NCAA quarter-finals appearance. She made one appearance in the 2022 season, on August 28 against Boston University Terriers, before announcing she would be ending her Michigan career early due to a lower body injury. In total she made 47 appearances for Michigan, registering one goal and three assists.

== Club career ==
In April 2022, Riviere signed with AFC Ann Arbor of the amateur USL W League ahead of the inaugural 2022 USL W League season. She made four appearances during the season.

Despite being touted as a first-round pick, Riviere did not declare for the 2023 NWSL Draft amid rumoured interest from European clubs. On January 21, 2023, she signed her first professional contract with English Women's Super League team Manchester United on a two-and-a-half-year deal. She made her debut on May 7, as an 86th-minute substitute in a 3–0 win against Tottenham Hotspur in the WSL.

Riviere scored her first goal for United on September 14, 2025, in a 5–1 win against London City Lionesses and her 50th appearance for the club.

== International career ==
=== Youth ===
In September 2015, Riviere saw her first involvement with the Canadian youth program as a 14-year-old when Bev Priestman called her up an EXCEL camp with the under-17 team. In March 2016, she was named to her first tournament squad, making four appearances at the 2016 CONCACAF U-17 Championship. Later that year she was part of the roster that finished as runners-up at the 2016 CONCACAF U-15 Championship, playing in all seven matches and scoring four goals before ending the year with a third tournament appearance, this time at the 2016 FIFA U-17 World Cup, playing in two matches. Having made her senior international debut in 2017, Riviere continued to feature at youth level, representing Canada at three major youth tournaments in 2018; she started the year playing in every match at the 2018 CONCACAF U-20 Championship, finished third at the 2018 CONCACAF U-17 Championship, and ended the year with a run to the 2018 FIFA U-17 World Cup semi-final.

=== Senior ===
In November 2017, Riviere was called up to the Canada senior team for the first time for a two-game friendly series against the United States. On November 12, 2017, she made her senior international debut in the second of the two games, entering as a 71st-minute substitute for Adriana Leon in a 3–1 defeat to the United States. She started her first match for the senior team on April 8, 2019, and assisted both goals in a 2–1 friendly win against Nigeria.

In May 2019, she was named to the roster for the 2019 FIFA World Cup in France. Having been an unused substitute for the opening game, she started the next group game, a 2–0 over New Zealand. She made a further two appearances, both as a substitute as Canada was eliminated by Sweden in the quarter-finals.

She scored her first goal for the senior team on January 29, 2020, the sixth goal in a 11–0 win over Saint Kitts and Nevis during the 2020 CONCACAF Olympic Qualifying Championship.

In 2021, Riviere represented Canada at the 2020 Summer Olympics in Tokyo, Japan. An unused substitute for the opening game, Riverie replaced Allysha Chapman as starter in the remaining group stage matches, beating Chile and drawing with Great Britain. Having picked up a yellow card against Brazil in the quarter-final, Riviere was suspended on yellow card accumulation for the semi-final against the United States but returned for the gold medal match, substituting on during overtime as Canada won gold in a penalty shootout victory over Sweden.

Riviere was called up to the Canada squad for the 2022 CONCACAF W Championship, where Canada finished as runners-up.

Riviere was called up to the 23-player Canada squad for the 2023 FIFA World Cup.

Riviere was called up to the Canada squad for the 2024 Summer Olympics.

== Personal life ==
Riviere's father was born in Dominica, and her mother was born in Hong Kong. In 2021, Riviere was honoured in her hometown of Markham when Mayor Frank Scarpitti declared August 6 to be "Jayde Riviere Day" in Markham after Canada's gold medal victory at the 2020 Tokyo Olympics. Riviere regularly returns to her youth club Markham SC to help with soccer camps.

== Career statistics ==
=== Club ===
As of match played November 22, 2026

Club	Season	League			National Cup (Note: Includes the Women's FA Cup)		League Cup (Note: Includes the FA Women's League Cup)		Continental (Note: Includes the UEFA Women's Champions League)		Total	
Club	Season	Division	Apps	Goals	Apps	Goals	Apps	Goals	Apps	Goals	Apps	Goals
AFC Ann Arbor	2022	USL W League	4	0	—		—		—		4	0
Manchester United	2022–23	Women's Super League	1	0	0	0	0	0	—		1	0
Manchester United	2023–24	Women's Super League	15	0	3	0	2	0	2	0	22	0
Manchester United	2024–25	Women's Super League	18	0	2	0	2	0	—		22	0
Manchester United	2025–26	Women's Super League	19	1	0	0	2	0	12	0	33	1
Manchester United	2026–27	Women's Super League	5	0	0	0	1	0	—		6	0
Manchester United	Total		58	1	5	0	7	0	14	0	84	1
Career total			62	1	5	0	7	0	14	0	88	1

=== International ===
As of match played April 18, 2026

Appearances and goals by national team and year
National team	Year	Apps	Goals
Canada	2017	1	0
Canada	2018	0	0
Canada	2019	8	0
Canada	2020	6	1
Canada	2021	11	0
Canada	2022	10	0
Canada	2023	7	0
Canada	2024	4	0
Canada	2025	6	0
Canada	2026	3	0
Total		56	1

As of match played January 29, 2020
Scores and results list Canada's goal tally first, score column indicates score after each Riviere goal.

List of international goals scored by Jayde Riviere
No.	Date	Cap	Venue	Opponent	Score	Result	Competition
1	January 29, 2020	10	H-E-B Park, Edinburg, United States	Saint Kitts and Nevis	6–0	11–0	2020 CONCACAF Women's Olympic Qualifying Championship

== Honours ==
Michigan Wolverines

- Big Ten Conference women's soccer tournament: 2021

Manchester United

- Women's FA Cup: 2023–24; runner-up: 2022–23, 2024–25
- Women's League Cup runner-up: 2025–26

Canada

- CONCACAF Girls' U-15 Championship runner-up: 2016
- Summer Olympics gold medal: 2021
- Pinatar Cup: 2025

Individual

- Big Ten Conference All-Freshman Team: 2017
- PFA WSL Team of the Year: 2024–25
