= Frogner, Akershus =

Coordinates: 60°1′24″N 11°6′38″E

Frogner
- Village
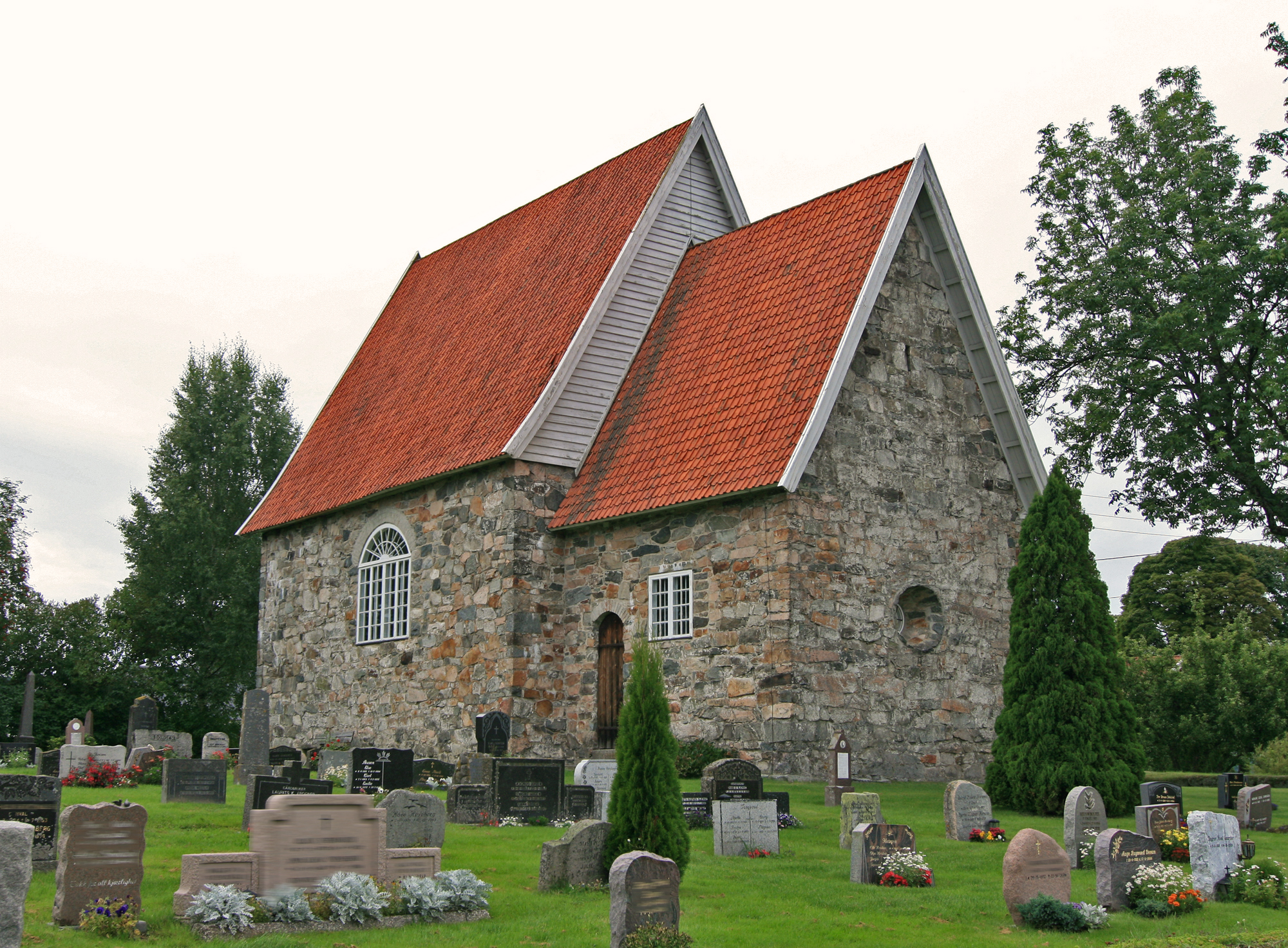
- The old church in Frogner. Foto: Mahlum
- Interactive map of Frogner
- Country: Norway
- Region: Østlandet
- County: Akershus
- Time zone: UTC+01:00 (CET)
  - Summer (DST): UTC+02:00 (CEST)
- Post Code: 2016

Frogner is a village in Sørum municipality, Norway. Its population is 1,174.

== Notable people ==
- Celin Bizet Dønnum (born 2001), football player for the Norway national team
