= Simi Awujo =

Canadian soccer player (born 2003)

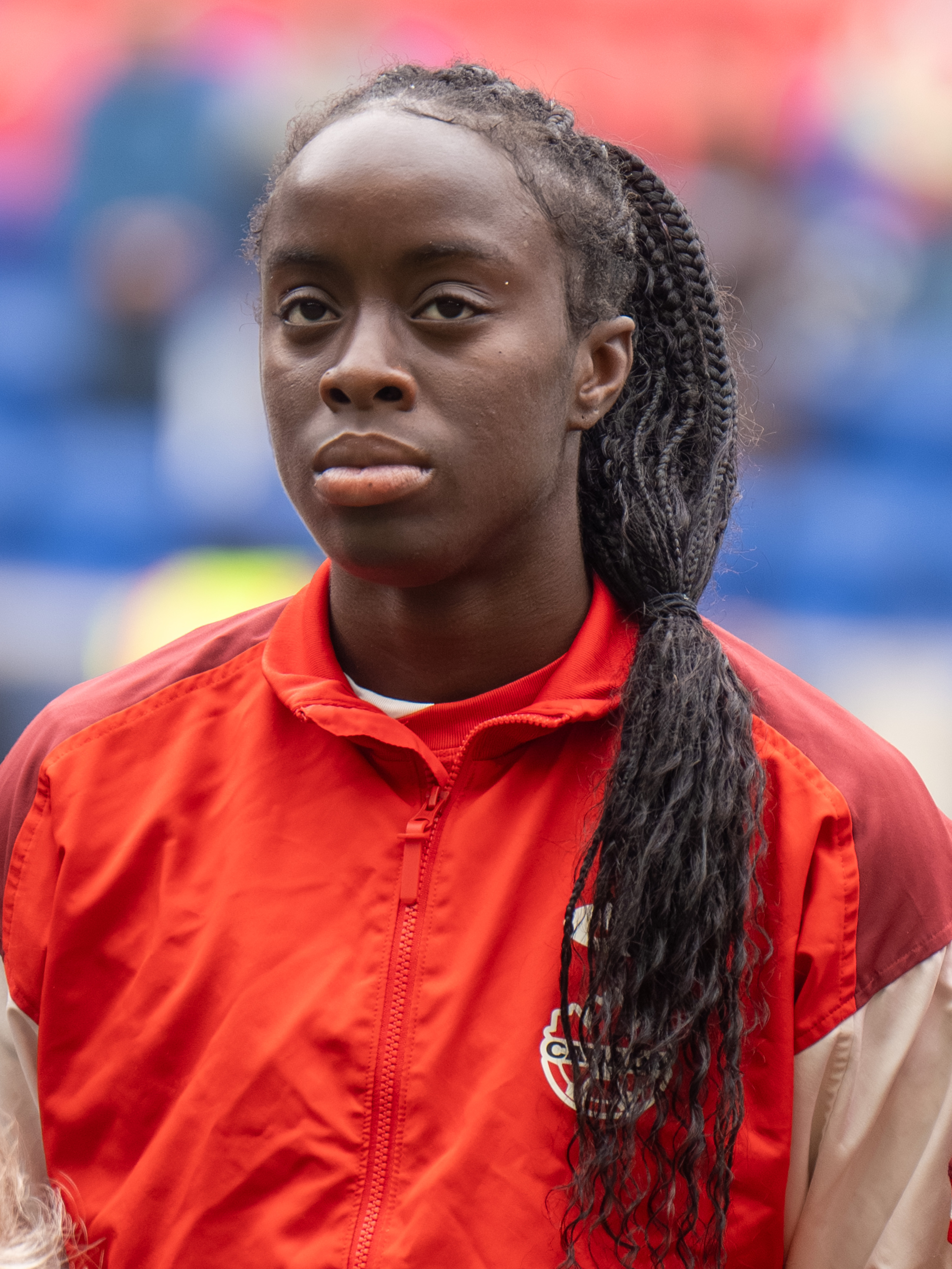
- Awujo with Canada in 2026

Personal information
- Full name: Simisola Feyishayo Awujo
- Date of birth: September 23, 2003 (age 23)
- Place of birth: Atlanta, Georgia, United States
- Height: 1.75 m (5 ft 9 in)
- Position: Midfielder

Team information
- Current team: Manchester United
- Number: 13

Youth career
- AFC Lightning
- NASA Tophat
- Southern Soccer Academy

College career
Years	Team	Apps	(Gls)
2021–2023	USC Trojans	49	(4)

Senior career*
Years	Team	Apps	(Gls)
2023	FC Premier Women	4	(1)
2024–	Manchester United	34	(2)

International career^{‡}
2019	United States U17	3	(0)
2022	Canada U20	10	(0)
2022–	Canada	37	(1)
- * Club domestic league appearances and goals as of November 22, 2026 ‡ National team caps and goals as of October 12, 2026

Simisola Feyishayo Awujo LL-Q34311 (yor)-Tunmise123-Simisola Feyishayo.wav(Yoruba: [sìmísólá fèjíʃàjɔ̀ àwùd͡ʒɔ̀]; born September 23, 2003) is a soccer player who plays as a midfielder for English Women's Super League club Manchester United. Born in the United States and a former United States under-17 international, she represents Canada at senior international level.

== Early life ==
Awujo began playing youth soccer at age seven with AFC Lightning in her hometown Peachtree City, Georgia, United States. Afterwards, she played youth soccer with NASA Tophat and Southern Soccer Academy, as well as three years of Olympic Development Program (ODP) from 2014 to 2016. While at Woodward Academy, she competed in track and field, helping set school records in the 4x100 and 4x400.

== College career ==
In 2021, she began attending the University of Southern California, where she played college soccer for the USC Trojans. She scored her first goal on September 5, 2021, against the Western Michigan Broncos. In her first season, she played in all 20 games including 15 starts, scoring two goals and creating two assists primarily as a holding midfielder, and was named to the Pac-12 All-Freshman Team. As a sophomore, she made 11 appearances, scoring two goals and three assists. She was named All-Pac 12 First Team as well as CSC Academic All-District Team. After her junior season in 2023, she appeared in 18 games, registering two assists, and was again named to the All-Pac 12 First Team. Academically she earned Scholar All-America third team, CSC Academic All-District and Pac-12 Honor Roll honors She departed prior to her senior year, having made a total of 49 appearances. She studied computer science and business and pursued her studies remotely while playing for Manchester United.

== Club career ==
In summer 2023, Awujo appeared in the Women's Premier Soccer League for FC Premier Women, scoring one goal and making three assists in four appearances. She was named the Coastal Division Offensive Player of the Year and to the Coastal Division Best XI.

On August 9, 2024, Awujo signed a thee-year contract with English Women's Super League club Manchester United. She made her debut on September 21, as a 77th-minute substitute in an opening day 3–0 win at Old Trafford.

Competing for United in the May 2025 World Sevens Football tournament, she was named as the competition's breakout star.

== International career ==
=== Youth ===
Awujo was eligible to represent the United States (where she was born), Nigeria (where both her parents were born), and Canada (as her mother is a citizen).

In 2019, she represented the United States under-17 at a UEFA Women's Development Tournament in the Czech Republic. She was recalled to an under-17 training camp in 2020.

In January 2022, she attended her first camp with the Canada under-20 team, later being selected for the 2022 CONCACAF Women's U-20 Championship, where she won a bronze medal, and to the 2022 FIFA U-20 Women's World Cup roster, where she played every minute as Canada lost every match and were eliminated at the group stage.

=== Senior ===
In August 2022, Awujo earned her first callup to the senior Canada national team for a pair of friendly matches against Australia. She made her debut on September 3, 2022, coming on as a substitute in the 75th minute. She was named the women's 2022 Canada Soccer Young Player of the Year. In July 2023, she was named to the squad for the 2023 FIFA Women's World Cup. She was an unused substitute for all three matches as Canada were eliminated at the group stage. She scored her first senior international goal on December 1, 2023, in a 5–0 victory in a friendly against Australia. In February 2024, she was named to the roster for the inaugural 2024 CONCACAF W Gold Cup. She made her senior tournament debut on February 25, 2024, as a halftime substitute in a 4–0 victory over Paraguay. Canada were eliminated at the semifinal stage on penalties against the United States. In July 2024, she was called up to represent Canada at the 2024 Olympic Games. She made three appearances including two starts, as Canada were eliminated at the quarterfinals by Germany on penalties.

== Career statistics ==
=== Club ===
As of November 22, 2026

Appearances and goals by club, season and competition
Club	Season	League			National cup		League cup		Continental		Total	
Club	Season	Division	Apps	Goals	Apps	Goals	Apps	Goals	Apps	Goals	Apps	Goals
FC Premier Women	2023	Women's Premier Soccer League	4	1	—		—		—		4	1
Manchester United	2024–25	Women's Super League	12	0	1	0	4	0	—		17	0
Manchester United	2025–26	Women's Super League	11	0	2	2	3	0	9	0	25	2
Manchester United	2026–27	Women's Super League	11	2	0	0	5	0	—		16	2
Manchester United	Total		34	2	3	2	12	0	9	0	58	4
Career total			38	3	3	2	12	0	9	0	62	5

=== International ===
As of match played October 12, 2026

Appearances and goals by national team and year
National team	Year	Apps	Goals
Canada	2022	3	0
Canada	2023	6	1
Canada	2024	13	0
Canada	2025	6	0
Canada	2026	9	0
Total		37	1

==== International goals ====
As of match played December 1, 2023
Scores and results list Canada's goal tally first, score column indicates score after each Awujo goal.

List of international goals scored by Semi Awujo
No.	Date	Cap	Venue	Opponent	Score	Result	Competition
1	December 1, 2023	8	Starlight Stadium, Langford, Canada	Australia	4–0	5–0	Friendly

== Honours ==
Manchester United

- Women's FA Cup runner-up: 2024–25
- Women's League Cup runner-up: 2025–26

Canada

- Pinatar Cup: 2025
