= Hinata Miyazawa =

Japanese footballer (born 1999)

Hinata Miyazawa 宮澤 ひなた
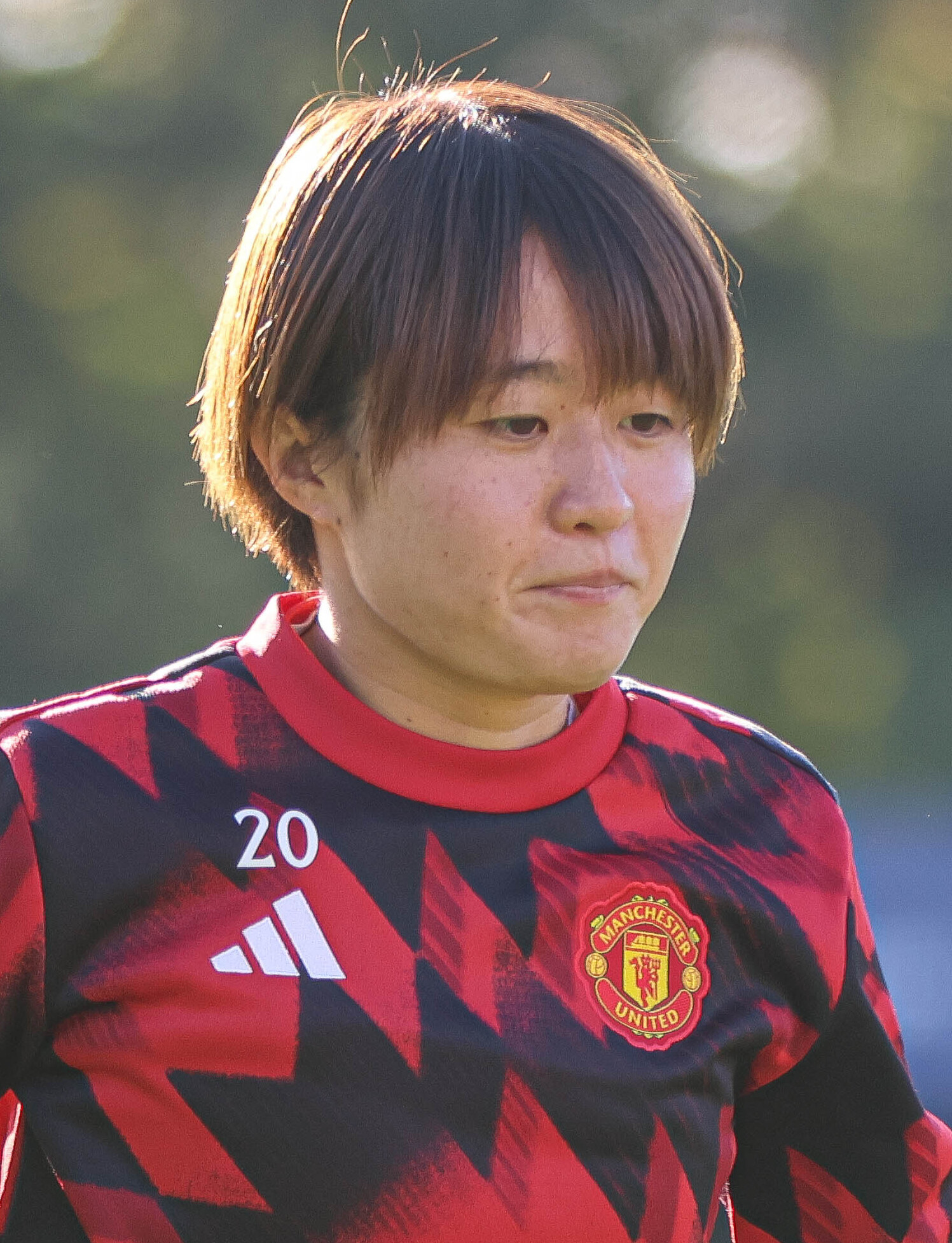
- Miyazawa with Manchester United in 2025

Personal information
- Date of birth: 28 November 1999 (age 26)
- Place of birth: Minamiashigara, Kanagawa, Japan
- Height: 1.60 m (5 ft 3 in)
- Position: Midfielder

Team information
- Current team: Manchester United
- Number: 20

Youth career
- 2015–2017: Seisa Kokusai High School

Senior career*
Years	Team	Apps	(Gls)
2018–2020	Tokyo Verdy Beleza	52	(13)
2021–2023	Mynavi Sendai	39	(4)
2023–	Manchester United	62	(3)

International career^{‡}
2016	Japan U-17	6	(1)
2018	Japan U-20	6	(1)
2018–	Japan	66	(12)
Medal record
Women's football
Representing Japan
AFC Women's Asian Cup
Winner	2026 Australia
FIFA U-20 Women's World Cup
Winner	2018 France
FIFA U-17 Women's World Cup
Runner-up	2016 Jordan
AFC U-19 Women's Championship
Winner	2017 China
AFC U-16 Women's Championship
Runner-up	2015 China
- * Club domestic league appearances and goals as of 19:10, 22 November 2026 (UTC) ‡ National team caps and goals as of 17:30, 18 October 2026 (UTC)

Hinata Miyazawa (宮澤 ひなた, Miyazawa Hinata; IPA: [mijazaɰa çinata]; born 28 November 1999) is a Japanese professional footballer who plays as a midfielder for Women's Super League club Manchester United and the Japan national team.

Miyazawa won the Golden Boot at the 2023 FIFA World Cup as the tournament's top scorer.

== Early life ==
Miyazawa was born in Minamiashigara on 28 November 1999. She was introduced to football at the age of three by her older brother, Keita.

== Club career ==
=== Tokyo Verdy Beleza ===
After graduating from high school, Miyazawa joined Tokyo Verdy Beleza in 2018. She received the Best Young Player Award in the 2018 Nadeshiko League season.

=== Mynavi Sendai ===
She transferred to Mynavi Sendai before the start of the inaugural WE League season in 2021.

=== Manchester United ===
On 6 September 2023, Miyazawa signed for Women's Super League club Manchester United. On 7 September, she was nominated as one of 30 candidates for the Women's Ballon d'Or. She earned her first start for Man United in the match against Leicester City on matchday 3, and recorded her first assist in the match against West Ham United on matchday 6. On 26 November, she scored her first goal for the club, opening the scoring in the 5th minute of the second half against Bristol City.

Over the course of the 2024–25 season, Hinata excelled in a deep-lying midfield role and became a regular United starter, starting 13 league matches compared to six in her first season. She was a key figure in midfield in 2024–25 as Man Utd finished third in the league and secured a Champions League qualification spot.

On 28 December 2025, Hinata renewed her contract with Man United until the summer of 2029. At the time of her contract renewal, she had started all 22 matches United had played up to that point in all competitions in the 2025–26 season.

== International career ==
In September 2016, Miyazawa was selected to join the Japan U-17 national team for the 2016 U-17 World Cup. She played in all six matches of the tournament, where Japan were the runners-up. In August 2018, she was selected to represent Japan on the Japan U20 national team for the 2018 U-20 World Cup. She played all six matches. In the final against Spain, she scored an opening goal and Japan won the championship.

On 11 November 2018, she debuted for Japan's national team against Norway.

On 13 June 2023, she was included in the 23-player squad for the FIFA World Cup 2023.

On 22 July 2023, at the FIFA World Cup, Miyazawa contributed to a 5–0 victory over Zambia by scoring the first goal and the third goal, and was named Player of the Match. She also had the best average speed in the match. On July 31, Miyazawa scored twice in Japan's match against Spain. She also assisted Riko Ueki's goal in the same match.

On 8 August 2023, she induced an own goal by Norway in the first round of 2023 FIFA World Cup knockout stage. She scored a decisive third goal just before the end of the game and helped Japan advance to the quarterfinals for the first time in two tournaments. She was awarded the VISA Player of the Match for the third time.

Miyazawa scored five goals overall, winning the tournament's Golden Boot and also equaling the goal tally of Golden Boot winner Homare Sawa at the 2011 FIFA World Cup.

On 14 June 2024, Miyazawa was included in the Japan squad for the 2024 Summer Olympics.

Miyazawa was part of the Japan squads that won the 2025 SheBelieves Cup and the 2026 AFC Women's Asian Cup.

== Style of play ==
Miyazawa primary position is an attacking midfielder. She also plays on the left side, including as a left side midfielder in a 4-2-3-1 formation and as a left winger in a 4-3-3 formation, making the left flank her base position. At Manchester United, similar to her time at Sendai, she has been praised as a “mini-Modrić” for playing selflessly as a lubricant in the team’s attack rather than focusing on her own scoring. Manager Marc Skinner highly values her football IQ, and regarding the left-footed mid-range shot she scored in the away match against Liverpool on September 28 in Round 4 of the 2025–26 Women’s Super League season, he praised it as “a strike you want to watch over and over again from a technical standpoint as well”.

== Career statistics ==
=== Club ===
As of match played 22 November 2026

Appearances and goals by club, season and competition
Club	Season	League			National cup (Note: Includes Empress's Cup, Women's FA Cup)		League cup (Note: Includes Nadeshiko League Cup, WE League Cup, FA Women's League Cup)		Continental (Note: Includes the UEFA Champions League, AFC Women's Club Championship)		Total	
Club	Season	Division	Apps	Goals	Apps	Goals	Apps	Goals	Apps	Goals	Apps	Goals
Tokyo Verdy Beleza	2018	Nadeshiko League	16	4	5	0	8	2	—		29	6
Tokyo Verdy Beleza	2019	Nadeshiko League	18	3	4	0	9	2	2	0	33	5
Tokyo Verdy Beleza	2020	Nadeshiko League	18	6	5	3	—		—		23	9
Tokyo Verdy Beleza	Total		52	13	14	3	17	4	2	0	85	20
MyNavi Sendai	2021–22	WE League	19	3	1	0	—		—		20	3
MyNavi Sendai	2022–23	WE League	20	1	1	0	5	0	—		26	1
MyNavi Sendai	Total		39	4	2	0	5	0	0	0	46	4
Manchester United	2023–24	Women's Super League	12	1	1	0	2	0	2	0	17	1
Manchester United	2024–25	Women's Super League	19	1	5	0	4	0	—		28	1
Manchester United	2025–26	Women's Super League	20	1	2	0	2	0	14	0	38	1
Manchester United	2026–27	Women's Super League	11	0	0	0	2	0	—		13	0
Manchester United	Total		62	3	8	0	10	0	16	0	96	3
Career total			153	20	24	3	32	0	18	0	227	27

=== International ===
As of match played 13 October 2026

Appearances and goals by national team and year
National team	Year	Apps	Goals
Japan	2018	1	0
Japan	2019	1	0
Japan	2020	0	0
Japan	2021	2	0
Japan	2022	13	4
Japan	2023	16	5
Japan	2024	9	0
Japan	2025	11	0
Japan	2026	13	3
Total		66	12

Scores and results list Japan's goal tally first, score column indicates score after each Miyazawa goal.

List of international goals scored by Hinata Miyazawa
No.	Date	Venue	Opponent	Score	Result	Competition	Ref.
1	30 January 2022	DY Patil Stadium, Navi Mumbai, India	Thailand	2–0	7–0	2022 AFC Women's Asian Cup	
2	24 June 2022	Sports Centre FAS, Stara Pazova, Serbia	Serbia	3–0	5–0	Friendly	
3	19 July 2022	Kashima Soccer Stadium, Kashima, Japan	South Korea	1–0	2–1	2022 EAFF E-1 Football Championship	
4	9 October 2022	Nagano U Stadium, Nagano, Japan	New Zealand	1–0	2–0	Friendly	
5	22 July 2023	Waikato Stadium, Hamilton, New Zealand	Zambia	1–0	5–0	2023 FIFA Women's World Cup	
6	22 July 2023	Waikato Stadium, Hamilton, New Zealand	Zambia	3–0	5–0	2023 FIFA Women's World Cup	
7	31 July 2023	Wellington Regional Stadium, Wellington, New Zealand	Spain	1–0	4–0	2023 FIFA Women's World Cup	
8	31 July 2023	Wellington Regional Stadium, Wellington, New Zealand	Spain	3–0	4–0	2023 FIFA Women's World Cup	
9	5 August 2023	Wellington Regional Stadium, Wellington, New Zealand	Norway	3–1	3–1	2023 FIFA Women's World Cup	
10	7 March 2026	Perth Rectangular Stadium, Perth, Australia	India	3–0	11–0	2026 AFC Women's Asian Cup	
11	7 March 2026	Perth Rectangular Stadium, Perth, Australia	India	4–0	11–0	2026 AFC Women's Asian Cup	
12	7 March 2026	Perth Rectangular Stadium, Perth, Australia	India	11–0	11–0	2026 AFC Women's Asian Cup	

== Honours ==
Tokyo Verdy Beleza

- Nadeshiko League: 2018, 2019
- Empress's Cup: 2018, 2019, 2020
- Nadeshiko League Cup: 2018, 2019
- AFC Women's Club Championship: 2019

Manchester United

- Women's FA Cup: 2023–24; runner-up: 2024–25
- Women's League Cup runner-up: 2025–26

Japan U20

- FIFA U-20 Women's World Cup: 2018

Japan

- AFC Women's Asian Cup: 2026
- EAFF Women's Football Championship: 2022
- SheBelieves Cup: 2025

Individual

- WE League Valuable Player Award: 2021–22, 2022–23
- FIFA Women's World Cup Golden Boot: 2023
- IFFHS Women's World Team of the Year: 2023
