= Elisabeth Terland =

Norway footballer (born 2001)

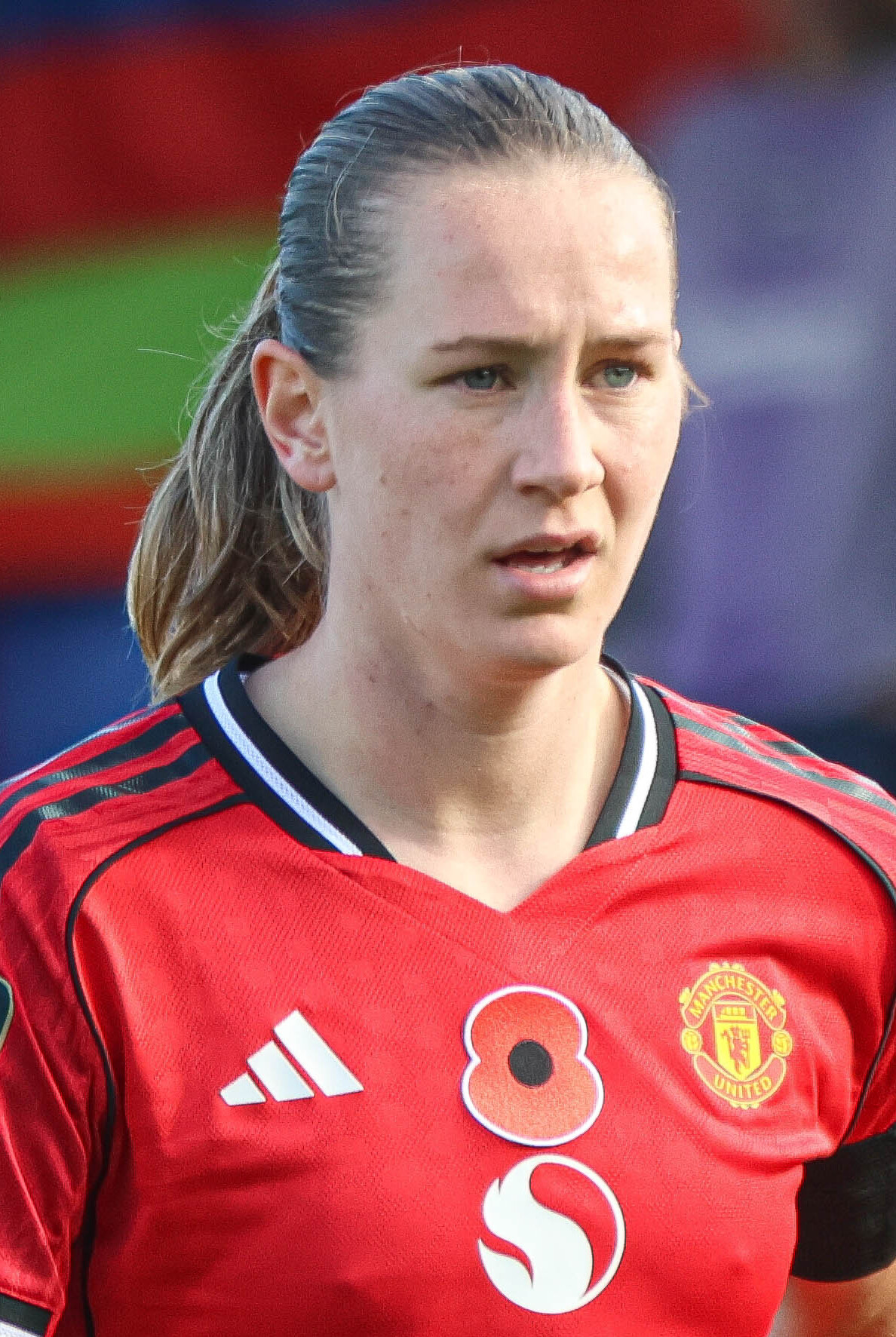
- Terland with Manchester United in 2025

Personal information
- Date of birth: 28 June 2001 (age 25)
- Place of birth: Stavanger, Norway
- Height: 1.71 m (5 ft 7 in)
- Position: Striker

Team information
- Current team: Manchester United
- Number: 10

Youth career
- –2014: Nærbø
- 2015–2016: Bryne

Senior career*
Years	Team	Apps	(Gls)
2016	Bryne	3	(0)
2017–2020	Klepp	65	(20)
2021–2022	Brann	32	(15)
2022–2024	Brighton & Hove Albion	39	(20)
2024–	Manchester United	49	(20)

International career^{‡}
2016	Norway U15	3	(0)
2017	Norway U16	5	(3)
2017–2018	Norway U17	15	(3)
2018–2020	Norway U19	20	(4)
2021–	Norway	52	(13)
- * Club domestic league appearances and goals as of 18:55, 22 November 2026 (UTC) ‡ National team caps and goals as of 13 October 2026

Elisabeth Terland (Norwegian: [ˈtæ̂ːrlɑn]; born 28 June 2001) is a Norwegian professional footballer who plays as a striker for Women's Super League club Manchester United and the Norway national team.

== Club career ==
Terland started her career in Nærbø IL before she transferred to Bryne at the age of 13. At Bryne she played mostly at the boys' team at her age, but also got a few matches for the women's team, which played in the third division (the fourth level of Norwegian football). Before she turned 16, she was already considered one of the country's greatest talents at her age.

=== Klepp ===
In December 2016 it became official that Terland had signed for Olli Harder and Klepp. At that point, she had already trained with the club for the entire previous season. At the age of 15, on 17 April 2017, she made her debut in Toppserien, the highest level in Norway. She started the match, which was the first of the season and against the previous year's winners LSK kvinner. The year after, in 2018, she played a role in Klepp getting an impressive silver medal in Toppserien.

In April 2019, Terland sustained an overuse injury. At that point she played for both Klepp's team in Toppserien and the U19 team, in addition to the U19 national team. She got back to play during the autumn, and her first match after the injury in Toppserien was 15 September 2019.

Despite the injury, she was named the greatest female talent in Norwegian football in 2019 in the Norwegian newspaper Aftenposten.

=== Sandviken/Brann ===
In November 2020, Sandviken announced that they had signed Terland and one of her teammates from Klepp, Tuva Hansen. Together they won Toppserien in 2021.

In January 2022, UEFA published a list over 10 female footballers to watch out for in 2022, which included Terland.

20 March 2022, Terland became the first player to score a goal in Toppserien for Brann's, as the team changed from Sandviken to Brann before the 2022 season.

=== Brighton & Hove Albion ===
On 1 August 2022, Brighton & Hove Albion announced that Terland had signed a two-year contract with them. At the start of the 2023–24 season, she scored five goals in six matches. In Brighton's first league game of 2024, Terland scored twice in the 3–2 victory over Bristol City, including the game-winner in the 95th minute, helping the team to move six points clear of relegation. In the away game against Leicester City, she scored to make it 3–2 in the 85th minute, giving her team the victory. Terland departed Brighton at the end of her contract.

=== Manchester United ===
On 17 July 2024, it was announced that Terland had signed for Manchester United on a two-year deal with the option for a further year. She made her debut on 21 September, starting in an opening day 3–0 win at Old Trafford. She scored her first two goals for the club on 13 October, against Tottenham Hotspur in a 3-0 WSL win. Both goals were assisted by fellow Norway international Celin Bizet.

On 27 August 2025, Terland scored her first professional hat-trick in a 4–0 UEFA Champions League qualification win against PSV Eindhoven. A month later, on 18 September, she netted another hat-trick in a 3–0 victory against her former club Brann, securing her club's first ever qualification to the Champions League league phase by winning 3–1 on aggregate.

== International career ==
Terland has played matches for several Norway youth nation teams, including U15, U16, U17 and U19. In her first match with the U15-team against Sweden in 2015, she had two assists. In 2019, she was part of the team that took part in the UEFA Under-19 championship in Scotland.

In October 2019, Terland was called up to the Norway national team for the first time. She made her debut for the Norway national team on 8 April 2021, coming on as a substitute for Amalie Eikeland against Belgium. Terland was part of the Norway national team during the Euro 2022.

In the first game after the European Championship, the crucial game to win the group in qualifying for the 2023 World Cup against Belgium, she was in the starting XI and won 1–0 with her team, which meant that the Norwegians qualified for the World Cup.

On 16 June 2025, Terland was called up to the Norway squad for the UEFA Euro 2025.

== Career statistics ==
=== Club ===
As of match played 22 November 2026.

Appearances and goals by club, season and competition
Club	Season	League			National cup (Note: Includes Norwegian Women's Cup. Women's FA Cup)		League cup (Note: Includes FA Women's League Cup)		Continental (Note: Includes UEFA Women's Champions League)		Total	
Club	Season	Division	Apps	Goals	Apps	Goals	Apps	Goals	Apps	Goals	Apps	Goals
Bryne	2016	3.Division	3	0	—		—		—		3	0
Klepp	2017	Toppserien	17	2	2	1	—		—		19	3
Klepp	2018	Toppserien	21	6	4	1	—		—		25	7
Klepp	2019	Toppserien	10	7	0	0	—		—		10	7
Klepp	2020	Toppserien	17	5	1	0	—		—		18	5
Klepp	Total		65	20	7	2	0	0	0	0	72	22
Brann	2021	Toppserien	18	5	5	1	—		—		23	6
Brann	2022	Toppserien	14	10	1	0	—		—		15	10
Brann	Total		32	15	6	1	0	0	0	0	38	16
Brighton & Hove Albion	2022–23	Women's Super League	17	7	3	0	2	1	—		22	8
Brighton & Hove Albion	2023–24	Women's Super League	22	13	3	1	3	1	—		28	15
Brighton & Hove Albion	Total		39	20	6	1	5	2	0	0	50	23
Manchester United	2024–25	Women's Super League	20	10	4	1	3	1	—		27	12
Manchester United	2025–26	Women's Super League	18	6	2	0	3	1	9	8	32	15
Manchester United	2026–27	Women's Super League	11	4	0	0	2	1	—		13	5
Manchester United	Total		49	20	6	1	8	3	9	8	72	32
Career total			188	75	25	5	13	5	9	8	235	93

=== International ===
As of match played 13 October 2026

Appearances and goals by national team and year
National team	Year	Apps	Goals
Norway	2021	10	5
Norway	2022	11	1
Norway	2023	7	1
Norway	2024	7	2
Norway	2025	12	1
Norway	2026	5	3
Total		52	13

Scores and results list Norway's goal tally first, score column indicates score after each Terland goal.

List of international goals scored by Elisabeth Terland
No.	Date	Venue	Opponent	Score	Result	Competition
1	16 September 2021	Ullevaal Stadion, Oslo, Norway	Armenia	10–0	10–0	2023 FIFA Women's World Cup qualification
2	26 October 2021	Ullevaal Stadion, Oslo, Norway	Belgium	3–0	4–0	2023 FIFA Women's World Cup qualification
3	25 November 2021	Arena Kombëtare, Tirana, Albania	Albania	7–0	7–0	2023 FIFA Women's World Cup qualification
4	30 November 2021	Yerevan Football Academy Stadium, Yerevan, Armenia	Armenia	1–0	10–0	2023 FIFA Women's World Cup qualification
5	30 November 2021	Yerevan Football Academy Stadium, Yerevan, Armenia	Armenia	2–0	10–0	2023 FIFA Women's World Cup qualification
6	23 February 2022	Estádio Algarve, Algarve, Portugal	Portugal	1–0	2–0	2022 Algarve Cup
7	26 February 2023	Estádio Cidade de Barcelos, Barcelos, Portugal	Portugal	2–2	2–3	2023–24 UEFA Women's Nations League
8	27 February 2024	Viking Stadion, Stavanger, Norway	Croatia	1–0	5–0	2023–24 UEFA Women's Nations League play-offs
9	5 April 2024	Ullevaal Stadion, Oslo, Norway	Finland	4–0	4–0	UEFA Women's Euro 2025 qualification
10	25 February 2025	Viking Stadion, Stavanger, Norway	Switzerland	1–0	2–1	2025 UEFA Women's Nations League
11	13 October 2026	Ullevaal Stadion, Oslo, Norway	Romania	2–0	6–0	2027 FIFA Women's World Cup play-offs
12	13 October 2026	Ullevaal Stadion, Oslo, Norway	Romania	3–0	6–0	2027 FIFA Women's World Cup play-offs
13	13 October 2026	Ullevaal Stadion, Oslo, Norway	Romania	4–0	6–0	2027 FIFA Women's World Cup play-offs

== Honours ==
Brann

- Toppserien: 2021

Manchester United

- Women's FA Cup runner-up: 2024–25
- Women's League Cup runner-up: 2025–26

Individual

- Brighton & Hove Albion Player of the Season: 2023-24
