= Anna Sandberg =

Swedish footballer (born 2003)

- Sandberg with Manchester United in 2026

Personal information
- Full name: Anna Linnea Sandberg
- Date of birth: 23 May 2003 (age 23)
- Place of birth: Sweden
- Height: 1.66 m (5 ft 5 in)
- Position: Left-back

Team information
- Current team: Manchester United
- Number: 2

Youth career
- IFK Lindesberg
- Adolfsbergs IK
- Örebro SK Söder
- KIF Örebro

Senior career*
Years	Team	Apps	(Gls)
2019–2020	Örebro SK Söder	15	(1)
2020–2022	KIF Örebro	32	(0)
2022–2024	BK Häcken	46	(5)
2024–	Manchester United	41	(1)

International career^{‡}
2021–2022	Sweden U19	8	(0)
2022–	Sweden U23	8	(0)
2023–	Sweden	14	(0)
- * Club domestic league appearances and goals as of 18:25, 22 November 2026 (UTC) ‡ National team caps and goals as of 11:20, 14 October 2026 (UTC)

Anna Linnea Sandberg (Swedish: [ˈânːa lɪˈnêːa ˈsânːdbærj]; born 23 May 2003) is a Swedish professional footballer who plays as a left-back for English Women's Super League club Manchester United and the Sweden national team.

== Club career ==
=== Örebro ===
Sandberg started playing football at IFK Lindesberg and then she went on to play for Adolfsbergs IK. Her first senior club was Örebro SK Söder. She made her senior debut with the team in 2019, making four appearances in Division 1, the third highest league in Sweden. In December 2020, Sandberg signed for Damallsvenskan team KIF Örebro, initially joining the club's under-19 side but made her debut with the first team on 13 March 2020, starting and playing 63 minutes in a 3–0 defeat to Hammarby in the Svenska Cupen. She made a total of 38 appearances for the club in all competitions.

=== BK Häcken ===
In July 2022, BK Häcken paid a Damallsvenskan record transfer fee to KIF Örebro for Sandberg. She made her Champions League debut on 21 September 2022, 2022–23 Champions League qualifying, playing the full 90 minutes of both legs against Paris Saint-Germain as Häcken lost 4–1 on aggregate.

=== Manchester United ===
On 2 August 2024, English Women's Super League club Manchester United announced the signing of Sandberg on a three-year contract with an additional option year. The transfer fee was reported as a new record for a female Swedish player, surpassing the £150,000 Everton paid to Rosengard for Hanna Bennison in August 2021. On 3 October 2025, she scored her first goal for the club in a 1–1 draw against Chelsea in the Women's Super League. She sustained a knee injury during United's 3–0 Champions League victory over Atlético Madrid in February 2026, which manager Marc Skinner announced would prevent her from playing for approximately 8 weeks.

== International career ==
Sandberg took part in the first qualifying round for the European Championship in October 2021 with the U19 team and was able to qualify with the team for the second round. They qualified for the finals at a tournament in Croatia in April 2022, where they lost 1–0 to Spain in the semifinals. From September 2022 she was used in the U23 team.

On 16 February 2023, she made her senior debut in the 4–1 win over China, playing all 90 minutes. On 13 June 2023, she was named to the squad for the 2023 FIFA Women's World Cup in Australia and New Zealand, the youngest player in the squad. She made her World Cup debut on 2 August 2023, starting in the final group stage game, a 2–0 win over Argentina.

== Career statistics ==
=== Club ===
As of 22 November 2026

Appearances and goals by club, season and competition
Club	Season	League			National cup (Note: Svenska Cupen and FA Cup)		League cup		Continental (Note: Champions League)		Total	
Club	Season	Division	Apps	Goals	Apps	Goals	Apps	Goals	Apps	Goals	Apps	Goals
Örebro SK	2019	Division 1	4	0	0	0	—		—		4	0
Örebro SK	2020	Division 1	11	1	2	1	—		—		13	2
Örebro SK	Total		15	1	2	1	0	0	0	0	17	2
KIF Örebro	2021	Damallsvenskan	17	0	2	0	—		—		19	0
KIF Örebro	2022	Damallsvenskan	15	0	4	0	—		—		19	0
KIF Örebro	Total		32	0	6	0	0	0	0	0	38	0
BK Häcken	2022	Damallsvenskan	11	1	5	0	—		2	0	18	1
BK Häcken	2023	Damallsvenskan	21	0	1	0	—		7	1	29	1
BK Häcken	2024	Damallsvenskan	14	4	0	0	—		—		14	4
BK Häcken	Total		46	5	6	0	0	0	9	1	61	5
Manchester United	2024–25	Women's Super League	14	0	5	0	3	0	—		22	0
Manchester United	2025–26	Women's Super League	17	1	1	0	2	0	11	0	31	1
Manchester United	2026–27	Women's Super League	10	0	0	0	1	0	—		11	0
Manchester United	Total		41	1	6	0	6	0	11	0	64	1
Career total			134	7	20	1	6	0	20	1	180	9

=== International ===
As of match played 13 October 2026

Appearances and goals by national team and year
National team	Year	Apps	Goals
Sweden	2023	4	0
Sweden	2024	1	0
Sweden	2025	5	0
Sweden	2026	4	0
Total		14	0

== Honours ==
Manchester United

- Women's FA Cup runner-up: 2024–25
- Women's League Cup runner-up: 2025–26

Sweden

- FIFA Women's World Cup Bronze Medal: 2023
