= Melvine Malard =

French footballer (born 2000)

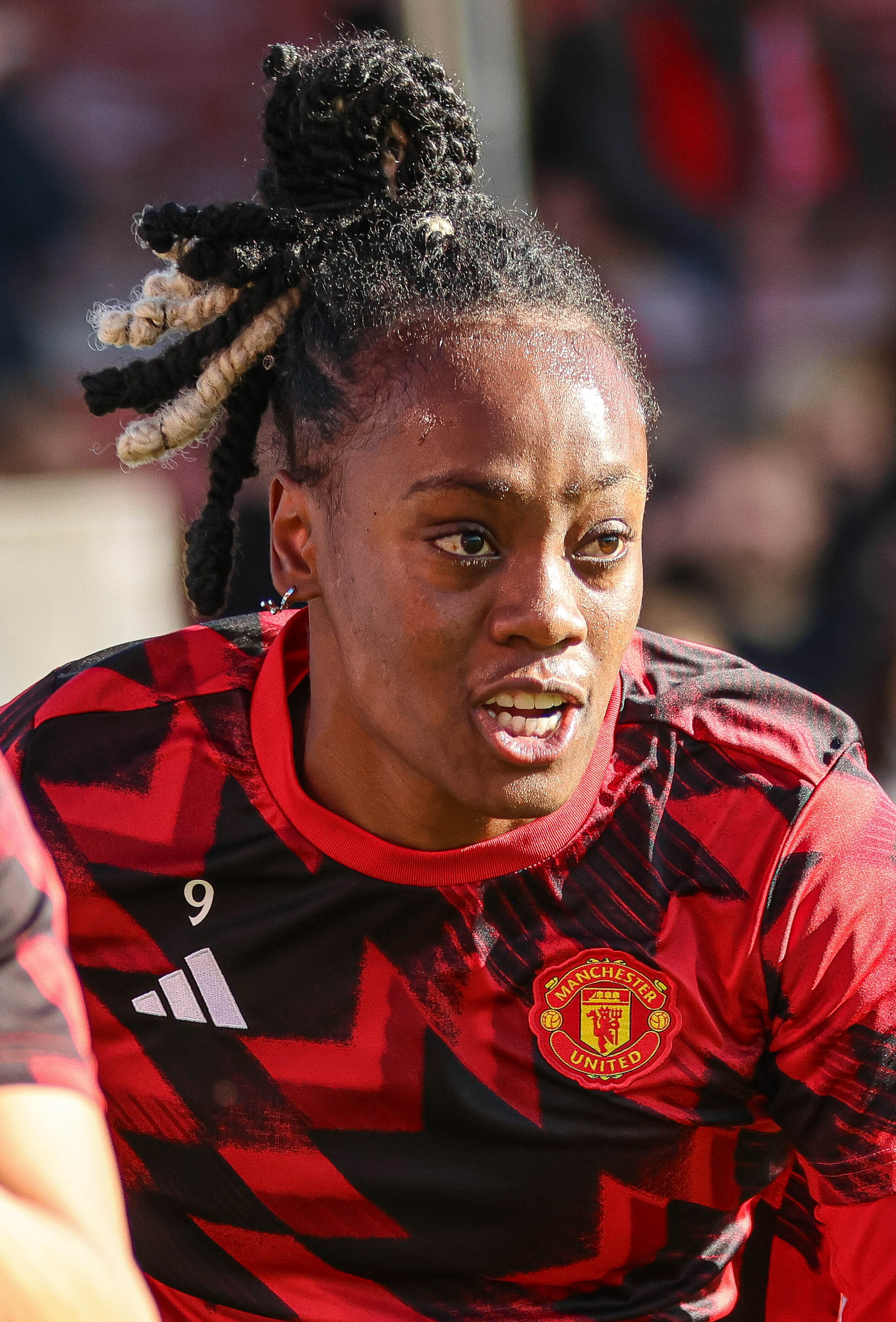
- Malard with Manchester United in 2025

Personal information
- Full name: Melvine Marie Ericka Malard
- Date of birth: 28 June 2000 (age 26)
- Place of birth: Saint-Denis, Réunion, France
- Height: 1.71 m (5 ft 7 in)
- Position: Forward

Team information
- Current team: Chelsea
- Number: 9

Youth career
- 2008–2014: Saint-Denis
- 2014–2017: Lyon

Senior career*
Years	Team	Apps	(Gls)
2017–2024	Lyon	58	(19)
2019–2020	→ Fleury (loan)	10	(3)
2023–2024	→ Manchester United (loan)	19	(5)
2024–2026	Manchester United	38	(10)
2026–	Chelsea	8	(6)

International career^{‡}
2016	France U16	10	(5)
2016–2017	France U17	9	(13)
2018–2019	France U19	17	(12)
2017–2020	France U20	10	(1)
2021	France U23	2	(2)
2020–	France	42	(15)
Medal record
Women's football
Representing France
UEFA Women's Nations League
Third place	2025
UEFA Women's Under-19 Championship
Winner	2019 Scotland
- * Club domestic league appearances and goals as of 20:15, 14 November 2026 (UTC) ‡ National team caps and goals as of 10 October 2026

Melvine Marie Ericka Malard (French: [mɛlvin maʁi eʁika malaʁ]; born 28 June 2000) is a professional footballer who plays as a forward for English Women's Super League club Chelsea. Born in Réunion, she plays for the France national team.

== Early life ==
Melvine Marie Ericka Malard was born on 28 June 2000 on the island of Réunion, an overseas department and region of France near Madagascar and Mauritius. She has a sister. As a child, Malard participated in a number of sports—including karate, judo, and handball—before trying football.

== Youth career ==
Malard began playing football around the age of six or seven, and joined Saint-Denis FC, on her native island of Réunion. She initially played as a central defender, and then a midfielder, before assuming the role of striker.

At the age of 14, while playing at INF Clairefontaine, Malard was spotted by the former French international Sonia Bompastor, who was working as Lyon's head of youth development. A few months later, Malard moved to mainland France in order to join Lyon.

== Club career ==
=== Lyon, 2017–24 ===
==== 2017–18 ====
In July 2017, shortly after her 17th birthday, Malard signed her first professional contract with Lyon. On 24 May 2018—though not named to the final matchday squad—Malard was a part of the Lyon team to win the 2017–18 Champions League.

==== 2018–19 ====
On 18 May 2019, Malard lifted her second Champions League title with Lyon as they defeated Barcelona 4–1. In doing so, she achieved a continental quadruple: the Division 1 Féminine, Coupe de France Féminine, Trophée des Championnes, and Champions League.

==== 2019–20 ====
For the 2019–20 season, Malard was sent on loan to FC Fleury 91. In January 2020, UEFA named Malard as one of the ten most promising young players in Europe. She returned to parent club Lyon ahead of the 2019–20 Champions League final, and appeared as a substitute in the team's victory over VfL Wolfsburg.

==== 2021–22 ====
In the 2021–22 season, Lyon's first with Sonia Bompastor as Lyon's head coach, Malard contributed 17 goals in 35 competition appearances. She cored the first ever Women's Champions League group stage goal following the restructuring of the competition ahead of the season. Malard won the 2021–22 Champions League with Lyon, starting the final against Barcelona in a 1–3 win. Aged 23, it was her fourth Champions Leagues title.

==== Loan to Manchester United, 2023–24 ====
On 15 September 2023, Malard joined Women's Super League (WSL) side Manchester United on loan for the 2023–24 season. On 10 October 2023, Malard scored United's first ever Champions League goal. She was named Manchester United's Player of the Month for October 2023. During her loan spell, she won the Women's FA Cup with United, the team's first major trophy, and scored five WSL goals.

=== Manchester United, 2024–26 ===
On 12 July 2024, Malard joined Manchester United on a contract that would run until 2027. Upon joining United permanently, she said "Here I felt loved."

=== Chelsea, 2026– ===
On 20 July 2026, Malard signed for Chelsea on a four-year contract. The reported fee—£850,000—marked a club record for Manchester United. In joining Chelsea, she reunited with Bompastor, her former head coach at Lyon, and the scout who brought her to the French side. Malard made her competitive debut for Chelsea in the first-leg of their Champions League qualifier against Real Sociedad, and scored twice in the team's 5–2 victory. Having suffered a minor injury during training, Malard was unavailable for Chelsea's first two league games of the season (a 1–1 draw to Aston Villa and a 5–0 victory over her former club Manchester United). On 8 September 2026, she was nominated for the Ballon d'Or Féminin. On 19 September 2026, Malard made her league debut for Chelsea, coming on as a second-half substitute and scoring her first WSL goal for the side.

== International career ==
On 18 September 2020, Malard made her debut for the France national team in a 2–0 victory against Serbia. She scored her first international goals against Kazakhstan on 26 October 2021, scoring in the 38th and 54th minute.

Malard was part of the France squad that won the 2022 Tournoi de France.

Malard was part of the France squad announced for the UEFA Euro 2022. She scored during the tournament, scoring against Iceland in the 1st minute and winning the Player of the Match award on 18 July 2022.

== Personal life ==
In February 2026, Malard announced her engagement to her partner, Justine. The pair became engaged in Mexico, and married on 23 June 2026.

Malard has named Marta, Dzsenifer Marozsán, and Ronaldinho as her favourite football players.

== Career statistics ==
=== Club ===
As of match played 14 November 2026

Appearances and goals by club, season and competition
Club	Season	League			National cup (Note: Includes the Coupe de France, Women's FA Cup)		League cup (Note: Includes the FA Women's League Cup)		Continental (Note: Includes the UEFA Women's Champions League)		Other (Note: Includes the Trophée des Championnes)		Total	
Club	Season	Division	Apps	Goals	Apps	Goals	Apps	Goals	Apps	Goals	Apps	Goals	Apps	Goals
Lyon	2017–18	D1F	0	0	0	0	—		1	0	—		1	0
Lyon	2018–19	D1F	2	0	1	0	—		1	0	—		4	0
Lyon	2019–20	D1F	0	0	0	0	—		1	0	0	0	1	0
Lyon	2020–21	D1F	20	3	0	0	—		6	4	—		26	7
Lyon	2021–22	D1F	20	13	2	0	—		13	4	—		35	17
Lyon	2022–23	D1F	16	3	1	1	—		8	4	1	0	36	8
Lyon	2023–24	D1F	0	0	0	0	—		0	0	0	0	0	0
Lyon	Total		58	19	4	1	0	0	30	12	1	0	93	32
Fleury (loan)	2019–20	D1F	10	3	1	0	—		—		—		11	3
Manchester United (loan)	2023–24	WSL	19	5	5	1	3	0	2	1	—		29	7
Manchester United	2024–25	WSL	17	4	5	1	4	1	—		—		26	6
Manchester United	2025–26	WSL	21	6	2	0	3	0	14	4	—		40	10
Manchester United	Total		57	15	12	2	10	1	16	5	0	0	95	23
Chelsea	2026–27	WSL	8	6	0	0	—		5	2	—		13	8
Career total			133	43	17	3	10	1	51	19	1	0	212	66

=== International ===
As of match played 10 October 2026

Appearances and goals by national team and year
National team	Year	Apps	Goals
France	2020	2	0
France	2021	6	2
France	2022	13	4
France	2023	1	0
France	2024	2	0
France	2025	11	4
France	2026	7	5
Total		42	15

Scores and results list France's goal tally first, score column indicates score after each Malard goal.

List of international goals scored by Melvine Malard
No.	Date	Cap	Venue	Opponent	Score	Result	Competition
1	26 October 2021	7	Astana Arena, Nur-Sultan, Kazakhstan	Kazakhstan	4–0	5–0	2023 FIFA Women's World Cup qualification
2	26 October 2021	7	Astana Arena, Nur-Sultan, Kazakhstan	Kazakhstan	5–0	5–0	2023 FIFA Women's World Cup qualification
3	16 February 2022	9	Stade Océane, Le Havre, France	Finland	2–0	5–0	2022 Tournoi de France
4	25 June 2022	12	Stade Pierre Brisson, Beauvais, France	Cameroon	1–0	4–0	Friendly
5	18 July 2022	16	New York Stadium, Rotherham, England	Iceland	1–0	1–1	UEFA Women's Euro 2022
6	6 September 2022	20	Stade Louis Dugauguez, Sedan, France	Greece	3–1	5–1	2023 FIFA Women's World Cup qualification
7	20 June 2025	28	Stade du Hainaut, Valenciennes, France	Belgium	2–0	5–0	Friendly
8	20 June 2025	28	Stade du Hainaut, Valenciennes, France	Belgium	4–0	5–0	Friendly
9	20 June 2025	28	Stade du Hainaut, Valenciennes, France	Belgium	5–0	5–0	Friendly
10	28 October 2025	34	Stade Michel d'Ornano, Caen, France	Germany	1–0	2–2	2025 UEFA Women's Nations League Finals
11	3 March 2026	36	Tallaght Stadium, Dublin, Republic of Ireland	Republic of Ireland	1–1	2–1	2027 FIFA Women's World Cup qualification
12	3 March 2026	36	Tallaght Stadium, Dublin, Republic of Ireland	Republic of Ireland	2–1	2–1	2027 FIFA Women's World Cup qualification
13	5 June 2026	40	Gdańsk Stadium, Gdańsk, Poland	Poland	1–0	2–0	2027 FIFA Women's World Cup qualification
14	9 June 2026	41	Stade des Alpes, Grenoble, France	Republic of Ireland	1–0	1–0	2027 FIFA Women's World Cup qualification
15	10 October 2026	42	Stade Francis Le Basser, Laval, France	Latvia	3–0	9–0	Friendly

== Honours ==
Lyon

- Division 1 Féminine: 2018–19, 2021–22, 2022–23
- Coupe de France: 2018–19, 2022–23
- UEFA Women's Champions League: 2017–18, 2018–19, 2019–20, 2021–22
- Trophée des Championnes: 2019, 2022, 2023

Manchester United

- Women's FA Cup: 2023–24

France U19

- UEFA Women's Under-19 Championship: 2019

France

- Tournoi de France: 2022

Individual

- UEFA Women's Under-19 Championship Golden Boot: 2019
- UEFA Women's Under-19 Championship Team of the Tournament: 2019
