= Jess Simpson (footballer) =

English footballer (born 2005)

- Simpson in 2026

Personal information
- Full name: Jessica Simpson
- Date of birth: 13 January 2005 (age 21)
- Place of birth: Clitheroe, Lancashire, England
- Position: Defender

Team information
- Current team: Manchester United
- Number: 26

Youth career
- –2016: Burnley
- 2016–2022: Manchester United

Senior career*
Years	Team	Apps	(Gls)
2022–	Manchester United	0	(0)
2023	→ Bristol City (loan)	1	(0)
2025	→ Bristol City (loan)	9	(0)
2025–2026	→ Southampton (loan)	22	(6)

International career^{‡}
2021–2022	England U17	5	(0)
2022–2023	England U19	5	(1)
2024–	England U23	3	(1)
- * Club domestic league appearances and goals as of 09:49, 24 September 2026 (UTC) ‡ National team caps and goals as of 23:47, 1 December 2025 (UTC)

Jessica Simpson (born 13 January 2005) is an English professional footballer who plays as a defender for WSL club Manchester United, and the England under-23 national team.

== Early life ==
Simpson is from Clitheroe, in the Borough of Ribble Valley, Lancashire. She is from a sporting family background and her grandad previously played for Accrington Stanley.

== Youth career ==
A product of the Manchester United Academy, Simpson began playing football aged four, joining Burnley aged ten. She then joined United aged eleven, followed by featuring for the under-16s, under-21s, and the academy team of the Professional Game League. Simpson featured in the under-21 side that won the Academy League and Cup in the 2021–22 season.

== Club career ==
=== Manchester United ===
On 27 January 2023, Simpson signed her first professional contract with WSL side Manchester United. She made her senior debut for United in a friendly match against Birkirkara FC in Malta.

In July 2024, she returned to training after her injury on loan to Bristol City. Her shirt number was confirmed as 38 for the 2024–25 season. On 20 November, Simpson made her competitive debut for United in the 2024–25 League Cup against Everton, as a 60th minute substitute for a 2–0 victory.

In January 2025, 90min referenced Simpson as one of six players who could be likely looking for a loan spell, having recovering from her ACL injury the previous season, and being "low down in the "pecking order" for her position at United. She signed a contract extension with United on 23 January 2025, keeping her at the club until 2027.

Simpson made her first competitive start for United on 23 September 2026 during a WSL Players Cup match against Sheffield United. In this match, she scored her first goal for the club, an Olimpico goal, and provided two assists in a 10–1 victory.

==== Bristol City ====
On 14 September 2023, on deadline day, Simspon joined newly promoted Women's Super League club Bristol City on loan for the 2023–24 season. On 21 October 2023, Simpson returned to United having suffered an anterior cruciate ligament injury during the League Cup match against Southampton. Simpson was one of three United players to suffer from the injury in the season.

On 7 January 2025, Simpson re-joined Bristol City, now playing in the Women's Championship, on loan for the remainder of the 2024–25 season.

==== Southampton ====
She was sent on loan again, this time to Southampton for the 2025–26 season, on 16 July 2025. In October Simpson was nominated for WSL 2 Player of the Month, having scored her debut goal against Portsmouth, an Olimpico goal (directly from a corner kick). SheKicks described her as "asserting herself as one of the best attacking defenders in the Championship", noting her four assistance for the season as of nomination.

== International career ==
On 11 October 2022, for 2023 U19 Championship qualification, Simpson scored her debut youth international goal for the England under-19s in a 1–1 draw with Denmark. On 2 December 2024, she made her debut for the under-23s in a 2–1 defeat to Sweden as part of a European competition.

== Personal life ==
In 2022 Simpson was studying sports science for a BTEC, with the intent to move to the United States. In 2023, she officiated the opening of a new multi-million pound facility in Blackpool. Simpson is an ambassador for Dan's Trust, a charity that has helped her with a grant towards her football career.
