= Celin Bizet Dønnum =

Norwegian footballer (born 2001)

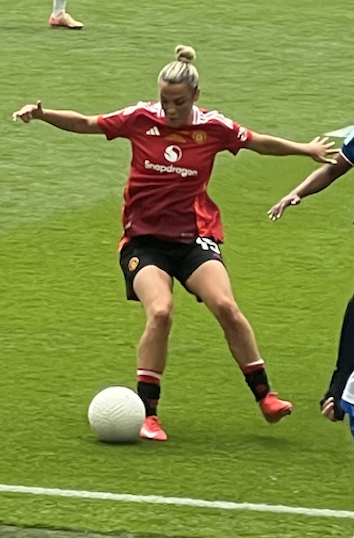
- Bizet in 2025

Personal information
- Full name: Celin Bizet Dønnum
- Birth name: Celin Bizet Ildhusøy
- Date of birth: 24 October 2001 (age 25)
- Place of birth: Frogner i Sørum, Norway
- Height: 1.68 m (5 ft 6 in)
- Position: Forward

Team information
- Current team: Manchester United
- Number: 11

Youth career
- Frogner
- Skedsmo

Senior career*
Years	Team	Apps	(Gls)
2016	Skedsmo	9	(7)
2017–2021	Vålerenga	69	(8)
2017–2019	→ Vålerenga 2	25	(18)
2019	→ Grei (loan)	3	(2)
2021–2022	Paris Saint-Germain	6	(0)
2022–2024	Tottenham Hotspur	42	(6)
2024–	Manchester United	29	(2)

International career^{‡}
2017	Norway U16	9	(6)
2018	Norway U17	7	(1)
2018–2020	Norway U19	24	(14)
2021–2023	Norway U23	5	(2)
2021–	Norway	31	(7)
- * Club domestic league appearances and goals as of 22 November 2026 ‡ National team caps and goals as of 10 July 2025

Celin Bizet Dønnum (Norwegian: [ˈseːliːn bizɛ ˈdœnːʉm]; née Celin Bizet Ildhusøy (Norwegian: [ˈɪldhʉːsøy]); born 24 October 2001) is a Norwegian professional footballer who plays as a forward for Women's Super League club Manchester United and the Norway national team.

== Career ==
Hailing from Frogner i Sørum, Bizet made her senior debut for Skedsmo on the third tier in 2016. Ahead of the 2017 season she transferred to Vålerenga, where she made her Toppserien debut against Avaldsnes in April 2017. She scored her first goal in May 2018 against Grand Bodø. In 2019 she was briefly on loan at Grei. With Vålerenga she was a losing cup finalist in 2017 and 2019, before winning the double in 2020.

After a good 2020 season, there were several speculations about a transfer abroad, but Bizet penned a new contract with Vålerenga in January 2021. She was also called up to national team training camp in the autumn of 2020.

In July 2021, Bizet signed for Paris Saint-Germain in the top flight of French football.

On 10 August 2022, Paris Saint-Germain transferred Bizet to Tottenham Hotspur in the top flight of English football, where she signed a contract until 2025.

On 4 September 2024, Bizet signed for Manchester United on a three-year deal. She made her debut on 21 September, as a 66th-minute substitute in an opening day 3–0 win at Old Trafford.

== International career ==
On 7 June 2022, Bizet was called up to the Norway squad for the UEFA Women's Euro 2022.

On 16 June 2025, Bizet was called up to the Norway squad for the UEFA Women's Euro 2025.

== Personal life ==
Bizet is the daughter of a former Norwegian footballer, Kjell Gunnar Ildhusøy and a Cuban mother. In June 2025, she married fellow footballer Aron Dønnum in a ceremony in Italy. They both took the surname Bizet Dønnum. They had been a couple for three years.

On 4 December 2025, it was announced that Bizet and her husband were expecting their first child together. On 15 June 2026, Bizet announced the birth of their son.

== Career statistics ==
=== Club ===
As of match played 22 November 2026

Appearances and goals by club, season and competition
Club	Season	League			National cup (Note: Includes Norwegian Women's Cup, Coupe de France Féminine, Women's FA Cup)		League cup (Note: Includes FA WSL Cup)		Continental (Note: Includes UEFA Women's Champions League)		Total	
Club	Season	Division	Apps	Goals	Apps	Goals	Apps	Goals	Apps	Goals	Apps	Goals
Skedsmo	2016	2. divisjon	9	7	—		—		—		9	7
Vålerenga 2	2017	2. divisjon	13	8	—		—		—		13	8
Vålerenga 2	2018	2. divisjon	5	4	—		—		—		5	4
Vålerenga 2	2019	2. divisjon	7	6	—		—		—		7	6
Vålerenga 2	Total		25	18	—		—		—		25	18
Vålerenga	2017	Toppserien	6	0	4	0	—		—		10	0
Vålerenga	2018	Toppserien	17	1	3	2	—		—		20	3
Vålerenga	2019	Toppserien	19	2	5	1	—		—		24	3
Vålerenga	2020	Toppserien	18	2	3	0	—		3 (Note: Appearances in UEFA Women's Champions League)	0	24	2
Vålerenga	2021	Toppserien	9	3	0	0	—		—		9	3
Vålerenga	Total		69	8	15	3	—		3	0	87	11
Grei (loan)	2019	1. divisjon	3	2	0	0	—		—		3	2
Paris Saint-Germain	2021–22	D1 Féminine	6	0	0	0	—		2	0	8	0
Tottenham Hotspur	2022–23	Women's Super League	22	2	2	0	3	0	—		27	2
Tottenham Hotspur	2023–24	Women's Super League	20	4	5	0	4	0	—		29	4
Tottenham Hotspur	Total		42	6	7	0	7	0	—		56	6
Manchester United	2024–25	Women's Super League	22	2	4	4	3	0	—		29	6
Manchester United	2025–26	Women's Super League	5	0	0	0	0	0	3	1	8	1
Manchester United	2026–27	Women's Super League	2	0	0	0	2	0	—		4	0
Manchester United	Total		29	2	4	4	5	0	3	1	41	7
Career total			183	43	26	7	12	0	8	1	229	51

=== International ===
As of match played 10 July 2025

Appearances and goals by national team and year
National team	Year	Apps	Goals
Norway	2021	1	1
Norway	2022	10	4
Norway	2023	4	0
Norway	2024	10	2
Norway	2025	6	0
Total		31	7

Scores and results list Norway's goal tally first, score column indicates score after each Bizet goal.

List of international goals scored by Celin Bizet
No.	Date	Venue	Opponent	Score	Result	Competition	
1	30 November 2021	Yerevan Football Academy Stadium, Yerevan, Armenia	Armenia	9–0	10–0	2023 FIFA Women's World Cup qualification	
2	20 February 2022	Estádio Algarve, Loulé, Portugal	Italy	1–2	1–2	2022 Algarve Cup	
3	23 February 2022	Estádio Algarve, Loulé, Portugal	Estádio Algarve, Loulé, Portugal	Portugal	2–0	2–0	2022 Algarve Cup
4	7 April 2022	Sandefjord Arena, Sandefjord, Norway	Kosovo	5–1	5–1	2023 FIFA Women's World Cup qualification	
5	7 October 2022	Ullevaal Stadion, Oslo, Norway	Brazil	1–2	1–4	Friendly	
6	23 February 2024	Opus Arena, Osijek, Croatia	Croatia	3–0	3–0	2023–24 UEFA Women's Nations League play-offs	
7	5 April 2024	Ullevaal Stadion, Oslo, Norway	Finland	1–0	4–0	UEFA Women's Euro 2025 qualifying	

== Honours ==
Vålerenga

- Toppserien: 2020
- Norwegian Women's Cup: 2020

Paris Saint-Germain

- Coupe de France féminine: 2021–22

Tottenham Hotspur

- Women's FA Cup runner-up: 2023–24

Manchester United

- Women's FA Cup runner-up: 2024–25
