= 2023–24 Aston Villa W.F.C. season =

Aston Villa
2023–24 season
- Head coach: Carla Ward
- Stadium: Bescot Stadium, Walsall
- WSL: 7th
- FA Cup: Fourth round
- League Cup: Semi-finals
- Top goalscorer: League: Rachel Daly (8); All: Rachel Daly (16)
- Highest home attendance: 12,533 (vs. Manchester United, 1 October)
- Lowest home attendance: 1,784 (vs. Brighton & Hove Albion, 17 December)
- Average home league attendance: 5,100
Home colours	Away colours	Third colours

The 2023–24 Aston Villa W.F.C. season was the club's 28th season under their Aston Villa affiliation. It was the organisation's 50th overall season in existence, and their fourth season in the Women's Super League (the highest level of the football pyramid). Along with competing in the WSL, the club also contested two domestic cup competitions: the FA Cup and the League Cup.

In November 2022, a new club crest was unveiled to be used from the start of the 2023–24 season, and it was later clarified that the new badge would be used exclusively on kits and training wear. The existing badge would continue to be used as the primary on all other channels, with consultations around a new permanent crest ongoing.

On 3 May 2024, it was announced that Carla Ward had taken the decision to step down as manager at the end of the season, despite having a year left on her contract.

== Squad ==
As of 31 January 2024

Note: Flags indicate national team as defined under FIFA eligibility rules; some limited exceptions apply. Players may hold more than one non-FIFA nationality.

No.	Pos.	Nation	Player
1	GK	NED	Daphne van Domselaar
2	DF	ENG	Sarah Mayling
4	DF	IRL	Anna Patten
5	MF	ENG	Lucy Staniforth
6	DF	SCO	Rachel Corsie (captain)
7	FW	SUI	Alisha Lehmann
8	MF	ENG	Jordan Nobbs
9	FW	ENG	Rachel Daly
10	MF	FRA	Kenza Dali
11	MF	ENG	Freya Gregory
13	GK	ENG	Sophia Poor
14	DF	ENG	Danielle Turner
15	DF	ENG	Lucy Parker

No.	Pos.	Nation	Player
17	FW	ENG	Ebony Salmon
18	MF	ENG	Georgia Mullett
20	FW	SCO	Kirsty Hanson
21	GK	NZL	Anna Leat
22	FW	NIR	Simone Magill
23	FW	CAN	Adriana Leon
25	MF	ENG	Miri Taylor (on loan from Liverpool)
26	DF	SUI	Noelle Maritz
28	MF	ENG	Alice Keitley
33	DF	ENG	Maz Pacheco
34	DF	ENG	Martha MacPhail
49	DF	ENG	Lydia Sallaway

== Transfers ==
=== Transfers in ===
Date	Position	Nationality	Name	From	Ref.
16 June 2023	GK	(Netherlands)	Daphne van Domselaar	(Netherlands) FC Twente	
6 July 2023	DF	(England)	Lucy Parker	(England) West Ham United	
11 July 2023	DF	(Republic of Ireland)	Anna Patten	(England) Arsenal	
11 August 2023	FW	(Scotland)	Kirsty Hanson	(England) Manchester United	
24 August 2023	GK	(England)	Sophia Poor	(England) Leicester City	
8 September 2023	FW	(England)	Ebony Salmon	(United States) Houston Dash	
11 September 2023	FW	(Canada)	Adriana Leon	(England) Manchester United	
6 January 2024	DF	(Switzerland)	Noelle Maritz	(England) Arsenal	

=== Loans in ===
Date	Position	Nationality	Name	From	Until	Ref.
1 February 2024	MF	(England)	Miri Taylor	(England) Liverpool	End of season	

=== Transfers out ===
Date	Position	Nationality	Name	To	Ref.
28 May 2023	MF	(England)	Remi Allen	(England) Birmingham City	
28 May 2023	FW	(England)	Chantelle Boye-Hlorkah	(England) London City Lionesses	
28 May 2023	FW	(Australia)	Emily Gielnik	(Australia) Melbourne Victory	
28 May 2023	FW	(Wales)	Natasha Harding	Retired	
28 May 2023	FW	(Republic of Ireland)	Ruesha Littlejohn	(England) London City Lionesses	
28 May 2023	DF	(England)	Evie Rabjohn	(England) Manchester United	
1 June 2023	DF	(England)	Elisha N'Dow	(England) Charlton Athletic	
1 June 2023	GK	(England)	Sian Rogers	(England) Charlton Athletic	
15 June 2023	GK	(England)	Hannah Hampton	(England) Chelsea	
20 June 2023	DF	(England)	Meaghan Sargeant	Retired	
4 July 2023	MF	(Wales)	Mary McAteer	(England) Sunderland	
5 July 2023	MF	(England)	Olivia Rabjohn	(England) West Bromwich Albion	
31 January 2024	MF	(England)	Laura Blindkilde	(England) Manchester City	

=== Loans out ===
Date	Position	Nationality	Name	To	Until	Ref.
14 September 2023	FW	(England)	Freya Gregory	(England) Reading	4 January 2024	
17 January 2024	MF	(England)	Olivia McLoughlin	(Scotland) Rangers	End of season	

== Preseason ==
19 August 2023 Friendly	Aston Villa	1–2	Southampton	Bodymoor Heath
		Report		Stadium: Bodymoor Heath; Attendance: Behind-closed-doors

26 August 2023 Friendly	Tottenham Hotspur	0–0	Aston Villa	Tottenham
		Report		Stadium: Tottenham Hotspur Stadium; Attendance: Behind-closed-doors

1 September 2023 Friendly	Villarreal (Spain)	3–3	Aston Villa	Benidorm, Spain
	Kanteh; Bicho; Giménez	Report	Magill; Mullett; Mayling (pen.)	Stadium: Meliá Villaitana Football Center; Attendance: Behind-closed-doors

== Women's Super League ==
=== Results summary ===
Overall								Home						Away					
Pld	W	D	L	GF	GA	GD	Pts	W	D	L	GF	GA	GD	W	D	L	GF	GA	GD
22	7	3	12	27	43	−16	24	1	3	7	13	28	−15	6	0	5	14	15	−1

Last updated: 18 May 2024.
Source: WSL

=== Results by matchday ===
Round	1	2	3	4	5	6	7	8	9	10	11	12	13	14	15	16	17	18	19	20	21	22
Ground	H	A	A	H	H	A	A	H	A	H	A	A	H	A	H	A	H	H	A	H	A	H
Result	L	L	L	L	L	W	W	L	L	W	W	L	D	W	L	W	L	D	L	D	W	L
Position	8	11	11	11	12	11	9	10	10	9	7	8	8	8	8	7	7	7	7	7	7	7

A = Away; H = Home; W = Win; D = Draw; L = Loss

=== Results ===
1 October 2023 1	Aston Villa	1–2	Manchester United	Aston
12:30	Parker (yellow card) 14'; Corsie (yellow card) 26'; Hanson (red card) 74'; Daly 76'; Leon (yellow card) 83'	Report	Geyse (yellow card) 33'; Toone (yellow card) 43'; García 79', (yellow card) 90+10'; Williams 90+2'	Stadium: Villa Park; Attendance: 12,533; Referee: Rebecca Welch

8 October 2023 2	Liverpool	2–0	Aston Villa	Birkenhead
18:45	Höbinger 21'; Daniëls (yellow card) 45+1'; Hinds (yellow card) 66'; Flint 77'; Lawley (yellow card) 90+4'	Report		Stadium: Prenton Park; Attendance: 2,963; Referee: Melissa Burgin

15 October 2023 3	Arsenal	2–1	Aston Villa	London
14:00	McCabe 90+2'; Russo 90+4'	Report	Pacheco 25', (yellow card) 43'; Parker (yellow card) 86'	Stadium: Emirates Stadium; Attendance: 35,829; Referee: Amy Fearn

21 October 2023 4	Aston Villa	2–4	Tottenham Hotspur	Walsall
12:30	Daly 5' (pen.); Corsie (yellow card) 76'; Parker 90+6'	Report	Thomas 33', 64', 72', (yellow card) 67'; Neville 45+5'	Stadium: Bescot Stadium; Attendance: 2,810; Referee: Lauren Impey

4 November 2023 5	Aston Villa	0–6	Chelsea	Walsall
12:30	Patten (yellow card) 35'	Report	Bright 21'; Kirby 26'; Rytting Kaneryd 56'; Lawrence 63'; Beever-Jones 67'; Charles 73'	Stadium: Bescot Stadium; Attendance: 4,086; Referee: Abigail Byrne

12 November 2023 6	Bristol City	0–2	Aston Villa	Bristol
14:00	Jones (yellow card) 38'	Report	Leon (yellow card) 35'; Connolly 77' (o.g.); Salmon 86'	Stadium: Ashton Gate; Attendance: 4,407; Referee: Melissa Burgin

19 November 2023 7	West Ham United	2–3	Aston Villa	Dagenham
15:00	Asseyi 27' (pen.); Stringer (yellow card) 39'; Filis (yellow card) 49'; Evans 80'; Cooke (yellow card) 85'	Report	Mayling (yellow card) 21'; Patten 31'; Leon 50'; Daly (yellow card) 85', (goal) 90+2'; Nobbs (yellow card) 90+6'	Stadium: Victoria Road; Attendance: 1,406; Referee: Keith Stroud

26 November 2023 8	Aston Villa	1–2	Everton	Aston
16:30	Daly 55'	Report	K. Holmgaard (yellow card) 20'; Snoeijs (yellow card) 45'; Patten 54' (o.g.); Björn 74' (pen.); Vanhaevermaet (yellow card) 90+2'	Stadium: Villa Park; Attendance: 4,203; Referee: Stacey Pearson

9 December 2023 9	Manchester City	2–1	Aston Villa	Manchester
12:00	Hemp 61', 65'	Report	Turner 7'; Corsie (yellow card) 30'; Mayling (yellow card) 75'	Stadium: Academy Stadium; Attendance: 3,047; Referee: Abigail Byrne

17 December 2023 10	Aston Villa	1–0	Brighton & Hove Albion	Walsall
18:45	Leon 63', (yellow card) 87'; Pacheco (yellow card) 80' (yellow-red card) 89'	Report	Losada (yellow card) 36'; Symonds (yellow card) 40'	Stadium: Bescot Stadium; Attendance: 1,784; Referee: Emily Heaslip

19 January 2024 11	Leicester City	0–1	Aston Villa	Burton upon Trent
19:00	Nevin (yellow card) 28'	Report	Daly 16'; Pacheco (yellow card) 90+9'	Stadium: Pirelli Stadium; Attendance: 1,064; Referee: Elizabeth Simms

28 January 2024 12	Manchester United	2–1	Aston Villa	Leigh
12:00	Parris 7', 33'; Riviere (yellow card) 82'	Report	Lehmann (yellow card) 17'; Daly 60' (pen.); Leon (yellow card) 73'; Patten (yellow card) 90+5'	Stadium: Leigh Sports Village; Attendance: 6,347; Referee: Adewunmi Soneye

3 February 2024 13	Aston Villa	2–2	Bristol City	Walsall
12:30	Nobbs 13'; Leon 60'	Report	Napier (yellow card) 11'; Thestrup 15'; Jones 75'; Hayles (yellow card) 83'; Yáñez (yellow card) 90+2'	Stadium: Bescot Stadium; Attendance: 2,190; Referee: Stacey Pearson

18 February 2024 14	Tottenham Hotspur	1–2	Aston Villa	Leyton
14:00	Turner 38'; Bartrip (yellow card) 90+5'	Report	Leon 23', (yellow card) 56'; Nobbs 60', (yellow card) 81'; Hanson (yellow card) 62'; Maritz (yellow card) 90+2'	Stadium: Brisbane Road; Attendance: 1,971; Referee: Adewunmi Soneye

3 March 2024 15	Aston Villa	1–4	Liverpool	Walsall
14:00	Mayling 37' (pen.), (yellow card) 37'	Report	Fisk 19'; Román Haug 29'; Bonner (yellow card) 37'; Koivisto 60', 82'	Stadium: Bescot Stadium; Attendance: 3,045; Referee: Lisa Benn

16 March 2024 16	Everton	1–2	Aston Villa	Liverpool
13:00	Stenevik (yellow card) 70' (yellow-red card) 90+6', (goal) 85'	Report	Dali 55'; Salmon 60'; Taylor (yellow card) 90+4'	Stadium: Walton Hall Park; Attendance: 1,097; Referee: Phoebe Cross

24 March 2024 17	Aston Villa	1–3	Arsenal	Aston
18:45	Salmon 35'; Daly (yellow card) 87'	Report	Pelova 54'; Wubben-Moy 84'; Blackstenius 86'; Cooney-Cross (yellow card) 90+2'	Stadium: Villa Park; Attendance: 10,076; Referee: Stacey Pearson

30 March 2024 18	Aston Villa	2–2	Leicester City	Walsall
12:30	Corsie (yellow card) 16'; Lehmann (yellow card) 24'; Leon 26'; Nobbs (yellow card) 55'; Daly 75'	Report	Momiki 28'; Tierney 56'; Pelgander (yellow card) 87'	Stadium: Bescot Stadium; Attendance: 2,182; Referee: Elizabeth Simms

17 April 2024 19	Chelsea	3–0	Aston Villa	Kingston upon Thames
19:00	Beever-Jones 18'; Hamano 38'; Ingle (yellow card) 61'; Buchanan 64'; Lawrence (yellow card) 77'	Report	Leat (red card) 4'; Corsie (yellow card) 8'; Daly (yellow card) 45+4'	Stadium: Kingsmeadow; Attendance: 1,801; Referee: Melissa Burgin
Note: Rescheduled from 21 April 2024 due to Chelsea's participation in the UEFA Women's Champions League semi-finals.

28 April 2024 20	Aston Villa	1–1	West Ham United	Aston
14:00	Patten (yellow card) 64'; Lehmann 72'; Dali (yellow card) 90+4'; Turner (yellow card) 90+6'	Report	Smith (yellow card) 27'; Cooke 90+5'	Stadium: Villa Park; Attendance: 4,282; Referee: Emily Heaslip

4 May 2024 21	Brighton & Hove Albion	0–1	Aston Villa	Crawley
13:00	Thorisdottir (yellow card) 18'	Report	Hanson (yellow card) 45+2'; Maritz (yellow card) 60'; Lehmann 64'	Stadium: Broadfield Stadium; Attendance: 2,651; Referee: Elizabeth Simms

18 May 2024 22	Aston Villa	1–2	Manchester City	Aston
15:00	Daly 68'; Parker (yellow card) 90+1'	Report	Fowler 21'; Hemp 77'	Stadium: Villa Park; Attendance: 8,912; Referee: Kirsty Dowle

=== League table ===
Pos	Team	Pld	W	D	L	GF	GA	GD	Pts
5	Manchester United	22	10	5	7	42	32	+10	35
6	Tottenham Hotspur	22	8	7	7	31	36	−5	31
7	Aston Villa	22	7	3	12	27	43	−16	24
8	Everton	22	6	5	11	24	37	−13	23
9	Brighton & Hove Albion	22	5	4	13	26	48	−22	19

Source: Women's Super League Table
Rules for classification: 1) Points; 2) Goal difference; 3) Number of goals scored.

== Women's FA Cup ==
As a member of the first tier, Aston Villa entered the FA Cup in the fourth round proper.

13 January 2024 Fourth round	Aston Villa	0–3	Everton	Walsall
12:30		Report	Olesen 58'; Snoeijs 80', 87' (pen.)	Stadium: Bescot Stadium; Attendance: 1,394; Referee: Amy Fearns

== FA Women's League Cup ==
=== Group stage ===
8 November 2023 Group stage	Sheffield United	0–5	Aston Villa	Alfreton
19:45	Brown (yellow card) 44'	Report	Daly 7' (pen.), 9', 26'; Salmon 31'; Turner 56'	Stadium: North Street; Attendance: 554; Referee: Aaron Ford

22 November 2023 Group stage	Aston Villa	7–0	Blackburn Rovers	Walsall
19:00	Salmon 2'; Lehmann 26', 68'; Pacheco 40'; Daly 65', 85'; Magill 89'	Report	Ferguson (yellow card) 37'	Stadium: Bescot Stadium; Attendance: 4,579; Referee: Phoebe Cross

13 December 2023 Group stage	Aston Villa	5–1	Durham	Walsall
18:00	McLoughlin (yellow card) 5'; Leon 49'; Corsie 53'; Daly 68', 76', 89'; Patten (yellow card) 90'	Report	Lambert (yellow card) 38'; Crosthwaite (yellow card) 45'; Pritchard (yellow card) 71'; Andrews 87'	Stadium: Bescot Stadium; Attendance: 1,488; Referee: Jane Simms

24 January 2024 Group stage	Sunderland	H–W	Aston Villa	Hetton-le-Hole
19:30			Lehmann 28'; Nobbs 37'; Corsie 43'; Salmon 46', 75'; Leon 90+2'; Fenton 90+7' (o.g.)	Stadium: Eppleton CW Ground; Attendance: 870; Referee: Lucy May
Note: Aston Villa won the match 7–0 but Sunderland were awarded a scoreless victory via independent tribunal and the record was expunged on 29 January after Aston Villa were found guilty of fielding an ineligible cup-tied player. As a result, Villa still qualified from the group but as a best-placed runner-up instead of a group winner.

Group A

Pos	Team	Pld	W	PW	PL	L	GF	GA	GD	Pts	Qualification	SUN	AST	DUR	BLB	SHU
1	Sunderland (Q)	4	3	0	1	0	8	4	+4	10	Advanced to knock-out stage	—	H–W	2–2	–	–
2	Aston Villa (Q)	4	3	0	0	1	17	1	+16	9	Possible knock-out stage based on ranking	–	—	5–1	7–0	–
3	Durham	4	1	2	0	1	7	10	−3	7		–	–	—	3–2	1–1
4	Blackburn Rovers	4	1	0	0	3	5	13	−8	3		0–3	–	–	—	3–0
5	Sheffield United	4	0	0	1	3	3	12	−9	1		2–3	0–5	–	–	—

Source: FA Women's League Cup
Rules for classification: 1) Points; 2) Goal difference; 3) Number of goals scored; 4) Number of wins; 5) Head-to-head record
(Q) Qualified to the phase indicated

Ranking of second-placed teams

Pos	Grp	Team	Pld	W	WPEN	LPEN	L	GF	GA	GD	Pts	PPG	Qualification
1	D	Tottenham Hotspur (Q)	4	3	0	1	0	15	3	+12	10	2.50	Advanced to knock-out stage
2	A	Aston Villa (Q)	4	3	0	0	1	17	1	+16	9	2.25	Advanced to knock-out stage
3	B	Manchester United	4	3	0	0	1	12	3	+9	9	2.25	
4	C	Crystal Palace	3	1	0	1	1	5	3	+2	4	1.33	
5	E	Charlton Athletic	3	1	0	0	2	3	4	−1	3	1.00	

(Q) Qualified to the phase indicated

=== Knockout stage ===
7 February 2024 Quarter-final	Brighton & Hove Albion	1–1 (a.e.t.) (0–2 p)	Aston Villa	Crawley
19:00	Sarri 35'	Report	Magill (yellow card) 46'; Hanson 69'; Pacheco (yellow card) 87'	Stadium: Broadfield Stadium; Attendance: 1,050; Referee: Lauren Impey
	Penalties
	Losada (penalty missed); Lee (penalty missed); Terland (penalty missed); Olme (penalty missed)		(penalty missed) Mayling; (penalty scored) Leon; (penalty missed) Corsie; (penalty scored) Patten

6 March 2024 Semi-final	Arsenal	4–0	Aston Villa	Borehamwood
19:15	Blackstenius 9', 11', 40'; Maanum 18'	Report	Corsie (yellow card) 39'	Stadium: Meadow Park; Attendance: 3,507; Referee: Paul Howard

== Squad statistics ==
=== Appearances ===
As of match played 18 May 2024

Starting appearances are listed first, followed by substitute appearances after the + symbol where applicable.

No.	Pos	Nat	Player	Total		WSL		FA Cup		League Cup	
No.	Pos	Nat	Player	Apps	Goals	Apps	Goals	Apps	Goals	Apps	Goals
1	GK	(Netherlands) NED	Daphne van Domselaar	15	0	14	0	0	0	1	0
2	DF	(England) ENG	Sarah Mayling	27	1	20+1	1	1	0	5	0
4	DF	(Republic of Ireland) IRL	Anna Patten	27	1	22	1	1	0	3+1	0
5	MF	(England) ENG	Lucy Staniforth	15	0	8+3	0	1	0	2+1	0
6	DF	(Scotland) SCO	Rachel Corsie	26	1	16+5	0	1	0	4	1
7	FW	(Switzerland) SUI	Alisha Lehmann	20	4	10+5	2	0+1	0	2+2	2
8	MF	(England) ENG	Jordan Nobbs	28	2	17+5	2	1	0	3+2	0
9	FW	(England) ENG	Rachel Daly	25	16	20	8	1	0	2+2	8
10	MF	(France) FRA	Kenza Dali	24	0	16+2	0	1	0	2+3	0
11	MF	(England) ENG	Freya Gregory	3	0	0+3	0	0	0	0	0
13	GK	(England) ENG	Sophia Poor	2	0	1+1	0	0	0	0	0
14	DF	(England) ENG	Danielle Turner	21	2	15+3	1	0	0	3	1
15	DF	(England) ENG	Lucy Parker	9	1	4+4	1	0	0	1	0
17	FW	(England) ENG	Ebony Salmon	24	6	5+13	3	0+1	0	4+1	3
18	MF	(England) ENG	Georgia Mullett	10	0	0+6	0	0	0	1+3	0
20	FW	(Scotland) SCO	Kirsty Hanson	22	1	12+4	0	1	0	3+2	1
21	GK	(New Zealand) NZL	Anna Leat	12	0	7	0	1	0	4	0
22	FW	(Northern Ireland) NIR	Simone Magill	18	0	5+9	0	0+1	0	1+2	0
23	FW	(Canada) CAN	Adriana Leon	22	6	14+4	5	1	0	3	1
25	MF	(England) ENG	Miri Taylor	8	0	4+4	0	0	0	0	0
26	DF	(Switzerland) SUI	Noelle Maritz	13	0	12	0	1	0	0	0
28	MF	(England) ENG	Alice Keitley	0	0	0	0	0	0	0	0
33	DF	(England) ENG	Maz Pacheco	23	2	12+6	1	0	0	5	1
34	DF	(England) ENG	Martha MacPhail	0	0	0	0	0	0	0	0
49	DF	(England) ENG	Lydia Sallaway	1	0	0	0	0	0	0+1	0
Players away from the club on loan:
16	MF	(England) ENG	Olivia McLoughlin	6	0	0+3	0	0	0	3	0
Players who appeared for the club but left during the season:
19	MF	(England) ENG	Laura Blindkilde	13	0	8+1	0	0+1	0	3	0
