= 2023–24 FA Women's League Cup =

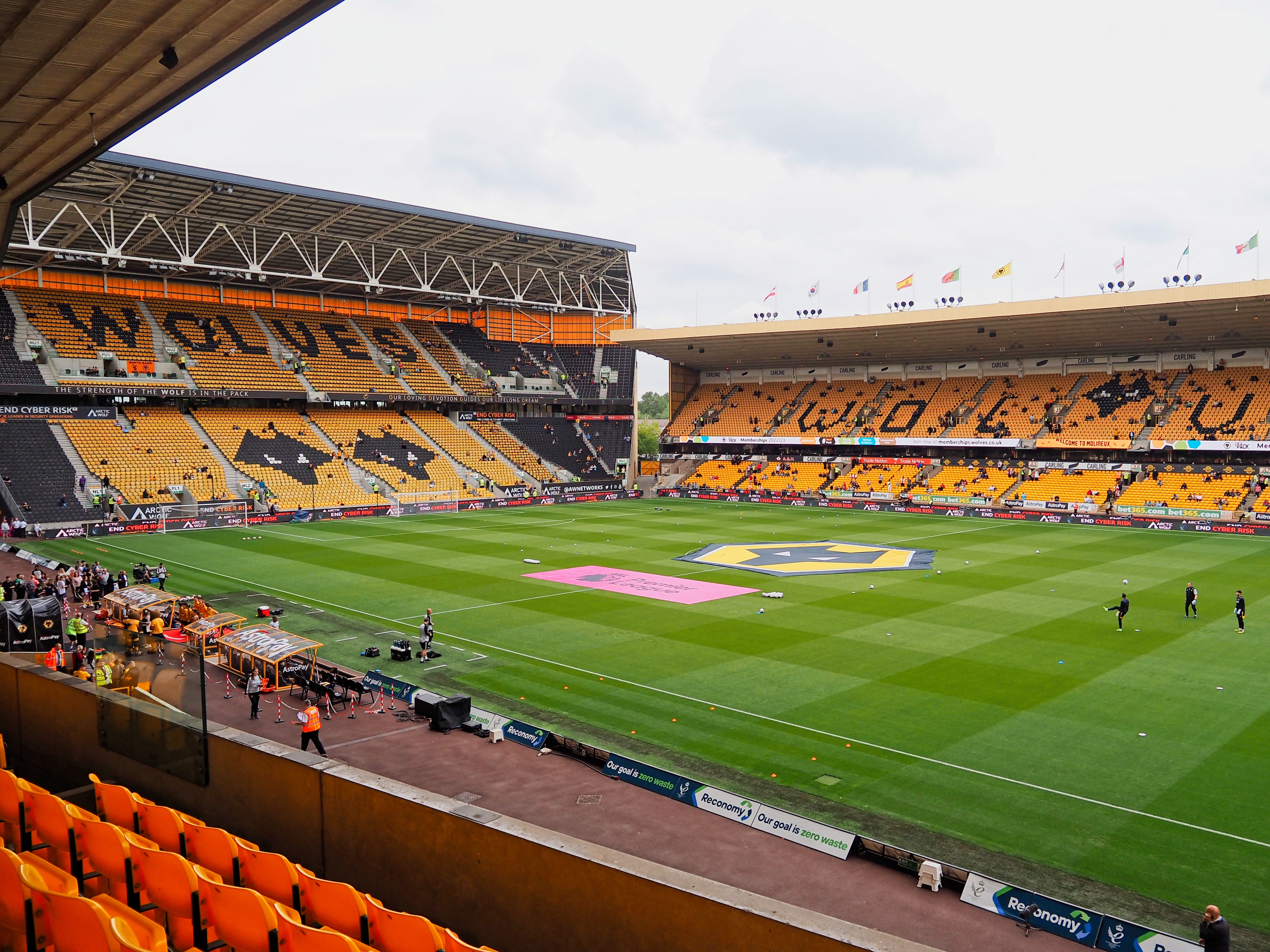
- Molineux Stadium hosted the final

Tournament details
- Country: England
- Dates: 11 October 2023 – 31 March 2024
- Teams: 24

Final positions
- Champions: Arsenal (7th title)
- Runners-up: Chelsea

Tournament statistics
- Matches played: 47
- Goals scored: 165 (3.51 per match)
- Attendance: 91,475 (1,946 per match)
- Top goal scorer(s): (Sweden) Stina Blackstenius Arsenal (9 goals)

The 2023–24 FA Women's League Cup was the 13th edition of the Women's Super League and Women's Championship's league cup competition. It was sponsored by Continental AG, who have sponsored the competition since its creation in 2011, and was officially known as the FA Women's Continental Tyres League Cup for sponsorship reasons. All 24 teams from the WSL and Championship took part in the competition. Arsenal were the defending champions.

It was the first season in the competition's history to utilise the VAR (Video Assistant Referee) and goal line technology.

== Format ==
The competition kept the same format as the previous season, starting with a group stage split regionally. Teams competing in the UEFA Women's Champions League group stage are exempt from the League Cup group stage, earning a provisional bye to the quarter-finals. As a result, the initial group stage draw made on 1 August 2023 featured 21 of the 24 teams: one Northern group had five teams drawn into it with the remaining Northern group and all three Southern groups initially featuring four teams each. The three teams excluded from the draw were Chelsea, who automatically entered the Champions League group stage and therefore joined the League Cup at the quarter-final stage, and Manchester United and Arsenal who took part in the Champions League qualifying rounds. If either team were eliminated during qualification, they would enter the League Cup group stage and be drawn into an existing group of four in their geographical region. Arsenal were eliminated from the Champions League in the first qualifying round and were drawn into Group D. Manchester United were eliminated from the Champions League in the second qualifying round and were automatically drawn into Group B.

The first place team in each of the five groups qualified for the knock-out stage. As Arsenal and Manchester United both failed to progress in the Champions League, the two best-placed runners-up also progressed to make eight teams in the quarter-finals.

== Group stage ==
=== Group A ===
Pos	Team	Pld	W	PW	PL	L	GF	GA	GD	Pts	Qualification	SUN	AST	DUR	BLB	SHU
1	Sunderland (Q)	4	3	0	1	0	8	4	+4	10	Advanced to knock-out stage	—	H–W	2–2	–	–
2	Aston Villa (Q)	4	3	0	0	1	17	1	+16	9	Possible knock-out stage based on ranking	–	—	5–1	7–0	–
3	Durham	4	1	2	0	1	7	10	−3	7		–	–	—	3–2	1–1
4	Blackburn Rovers	4	1	0	0	3	5	13	−8	3		0–3	–	–	—	3–0
5	Sheffield United	4	0	0	1	3	3	12	−9	1		2–3	0–5	–	–	—

Source: FA Women's League Cup
Rules for classification: 1) Points; 2) Goal difference; 3) Number of goals scored; 4) Number of wins; 5) Head-to-head record
(Q) Qualified to the phase indicated
11 October 2023
19:00

Durham	3–2	Blackburn Rovers
Noonan 2', 72' (pen.); Ryan-Doyle 90+1' (pen.)	Report	Seed 19'; Chandarana 29'

Maiden Castle, Durham
Attendance: 623
Referee: Ali Rahjoo
11 October 2023
19:45

Sheffield United	2–3	Sunderland
May 8'; Bourne 33'	Report	Scarr 30' (pen.); Rouse 45+3'; Cassap 67'

North Street, Alfreton
Attendance: 264
Referee: Abby Dearden

8 November 2023
19:30

Sunderland	2–2	Durham
Fenton 15'; Westrup 42'	Report	Lambert 5'; Noonan 90+3'
Penalties
Kitching (penalty scored); Scarr (penalty missed); Watson (penalty missed); Jones (penalty missed)	1–3	(penalty scored) Noonan; (penalty missed) Lambert; (penalty scored) Andrews; (penalty scored) Salicki

Eppleton CW, Hetton-le-Hole
Attendance: 665
Referee: Phoebe Cross
8 November 2023
19:45

Sheffield United	0–5	Aston Villa
	Report	Daly 7' (pen.), 9', 26'; Salmon 31'; Turner 56'

North Street, Alfreton
Attendance: 554
Referee: Aaron Ford

22 November 2023
19:00

Aston Villa	7–0	Blackburn Rovers
Salmon 2'; Lehmann 26', 68'; Pacheco 40'; Daly 65', 85'; Magill 89'	Report

Bescot Stadium, Walsall
Attendance: 4,579
Referee: Phoebe Cross
23 November 2023
19:00

Durham	1–1	Sheffield United
Andrews 30'	Report	Sigsworth 81'
Penalties
Andrews (penalty scored); Noonan (penalty scored); Bradley (penalty scored); Hepple (penalty scored); Salicki (penalty scored); Ryan-Doyle (penalty missed); Crosthwaite (penalty scored); Holmes (penalty missed); Briggs (penalty scored); Ayre (penalty scored)	8–7	(penalty scored) Rayner; (penalty scored) Brown; (penalty scored) Sigsworth; (penalty scored) Hodson; (penalty scored) Goodwin; (penalty missed) Newsham; (penalty scored) Graham; (penalty missed) Docherty; (penalty scored) May; (penalty missed) Adebowale-Arimoro

Maiden Castle, Durham
Attendance: 624
Referee: Rebecca Welch

13 December 2023
18:00

Aston Villa	5–1	Durham
Leon 49'; Corsie 53'; Daly 68', 76', 89'	Report	Andrews 87'

Bescot Stadium, Walsall
Attendance: 1,488
13 December 2023
19:00

Blackburn Rovers	0–3	Sunderland
	Report	Watson 33'; Cassap 74'; McInnes 82'

Lancashire FA County Ground, Lancashire
Attendance: 162

24 January 2024
19:00

Blackburn Rovers	3–0	Sheffield United
Shepherd 31', 36'; Thomas 88'	Report

Lancashire FA County Ground, Lancashire
Attendance: 128
24 January 2024
19:30

Sunderland	H–W (Note: Aston Villa won the match 7–0 but Sunderland were awarded a scoreless victory via independent tribunal and the record was expunged on 29 January after Aston Villa were found guilty of fielding an ineligible cup-tied player. As a result, Sunderland were promoted to group winners while Aston Villa still qualified from the group but as a best-placed runner-up instead of a group winner at the expense of Group B runners-up Manchester United.)	Aston Villa
	Report

Eppleton CW, Hetton-le-Hole
Attendance: 870

=== Group B ===
Pos	Team	Pld	W	PW	PL	L	GF	GA	GD	Pts	Qualification	MCI	MUN	LEI	LIV	EVE
1	Manchester City (Q)	4	3	0	1	0	10	7	+3	10	Advanced to knock-out stage	—	2–1	2–2	–	–
2	Manchester United	4	3	0	0	1	12	3	+9	9	Possible knock-out stage based on ranking	–	—	3–1	–	7–0
3	Leicester City	4	2	1	0	1	10	7	+3	8		–	–	—	2–1	5–1
4	Liverpool	4	1	0	0	3	6	8	−2	3		3–4	0–1	–	—	–
5	Everton	4	0	0	0	4	3	16	−13	0		1–2	–	–	1–2	—

Source: FA Women's League Cup
Rules for classification: 1) Points; 2) Goal difference; 3) Number of goals scored; 4) Number of wins; 5) Head-to-head record
(Q) Qualified to the phase indicated
11 October 2023
19:00

Leicester City	2–1	Liverpool
Palmer 35'; Cain 50'	Report	Flint 45+3'

Pirelli Stadium, Burton upon Trent
Attendance: 485
Referee: Lisa Benn
11 October 2023
19:00

Everton	1–2	Manchester City
Duggan 90+4'	Report	Park 21'; Shaw 48'

Walton Hall Park, Walton Hall Park
Attendance: 1,105
Referee: Megan Wilson

8 November 2023
19:00

Liverpool	3–4	Manchester City
Bonner 45'; Flint 47'; Enderby 90+6'	Report	Angeldahl 33'; Park 48'; Kelly 69', 81'

Prenton Park, Birkenhead
Attendance: 1,045
Referee: Elizabeth Simms
9 November 2023
19:00

Manchester United	7–0	Everton
Parris 28', 69', 78'; Williams 30'; Ladd 57'; Geyse 84'; Galton 89'	Report

Leigh Sports Village, Leigh
Attendance: 1,804
Referee: Megan Wilson

22 November 2023
19:00

Liverpool	0–1	Manchester United
	Report	Parris 41'

Prenton Park, Birkenhead
Attendance: 1,958
Referee: Melissa Burgin
22 November 2023
19:00

Manchester City	2–2	Leicester City
Castellanos 49'; Coombs 70'	Report	Cayman 41'; Howard 44'
Penalties
Greenwood (penalty scored); Fowler (penalty missed); Castellanos (penalty missed); Hasegawa (penalty scored); Roord (penalty scored); Houghton (penalty missed)	3–4	(penalty scored) Rantala; (penalty missed) Petermann; (penalty scored) Whelan; (penalty missed) Cayman; (penalty scored) Cain; (penalty scored) Howard

Academy Stadium, Manchester
Attendance: 1,358
Referee: James Bell

13 December 2023
19:00

Everton	1–2	Liverpool
Duggan 90+9'	Report	Haug 5'; Daniels 56'

Walton Hall Park, Walton Hall Park
Attendance: 1,242
14 December 2023
19:00

Manchester United	3–1	Leicester City
García 2'; Naalsund 20'; Zelem 65' (pen.)	Report	Whelan 26'

Leigh Sports Village, Leigh
Attendance: 2,068
Referee: Phoebe Cross

24 January 2024
19:00

Manchester City	2–1	Manchester United
Kelly 47'; Hemp 70'	Report 1 Report 2	Parris 90+5'

Academy Stadium, Manchester
Attendance: 4,818
Referee: Lauren Impey
24 January 2024
19:00

Leicester City	5–1	Everton
Tierney 18'; Rose 21'; O'Brien 28' (pen.); Goodwin 48'; Rantala 81'	Report	Bennison 90+5'

Pirelli Stadium, Burton upon Trent
Attendance: 231

=== Group C ===
Pos	Team	Pld	W	PW	PL	L	GF	GA	GD	Pts	Qualification	LCL	CRY	LEW	WAT
1	London City Lionesses (Q)	3	2	0	1	0	5	3	+2	7	Advanced to knock-out stage	—	2–1	–	2–2
2	Crystal Palace	3	1	0	1	1	5	3	+2	4	Possible knock-out stage based on ranking	–	—	–	3–0
3	Lewes	2	0	1	0	1	1	2	−1	2		0–1	1–1	—	–
4	Watford	2	0	1	0	1	2	5	−3	2		–	–	C–C	—

Updated to match(es) played on 24 January 2024. Source: FA Women's League Cup
Rules for classification: 1) Points; 2) Goal difference; 3) Number of goals scored; 4) Number of wins; 5) Head-to-head record
(Q) Qualified to the phase indicated
11 October 2023
19:00

London City Lionesses	2–2	Watford
Joel 21'; Neville 49'	Report	Rossiter 16'; Haines 87'
Penalties
Groves (penalty scored); Fitzgerald (penalty scored); Joel (penalty scored); Mukandi (penalty scored); Neville (penalty missed); Alexander (penalty scored); Culver (penalty scored); Satchell (penalty missed)	6–7	(penalty scored) Davison; (penalty missed) León; (penalty scored) Rossiter; (penalty scored) Haines; (penalty scored) Baptiste; (penalty scored) Meiwald; (penalty scored) Henson; (penalty scored) McLean

Princes Park, Dartford
Attendance: 216
Referee: Sunny Sukhvir Gill
11 October 2023
19:30

Lewes	1–1	Crystal Palace
Oakley 90+5'	Report	Hughes 64' (pen.)
Penalties
Palmer (penalty scored); Olding (penalty scored); Hamilton (penalty missed)	2–0	(penalty missed) Nolan; (penalty missed) Hopcroft; (penalty missed) Reilly; (penalty missed) Bailey-Gayle

The Dripping Pan, Lewes
Attendance: 403
Referee: Jade Wardle

22 November 2023
19:15

Crystal Palace	3–0	Watford
Reilly 52'; Dennis 72'; Hughes 77'	Report

Gander Green Lane, Sutton
Attendance: 284
Referee: Aaron Ford
22 November 2023
19:30

Lewes	0–1	London City Lionesses
	Report	Mooney 86' (o.g.)

The Dripping Pan, Lewes
Attendance: 315
Referee: Levi Gray

24 January 2024
19:00

London City Lionesses	2–1	Crystal Palace
Boye-Hlorkah 58', 64'	Report	Hughes 15'

Princes Park, Dartford
Attendance: 242
24 January 2024 (Note: Watford v Lewes was postponed due to a waterlogged pitch on 24 January 2024.)
19:30

Watford	Cancelled	Lewes
	Report

Grosvenor Vale, Ruislip

=== Group D ===
Pos	Team	Pld	W	PW	PL	L	GF	GA	GD	Pts	Qualification	ARS	TOT	SOU	BRI	REA
1	Arsenal (Q)	4	3	1	0	0	14	5	+9	11	Advanced to knock-out stage	—	3–3	–	3–1	–
2	Tottenham Hotspur (Q)	4	3	0	1	0	15	3	+12	10	Possible knock-out stage based on ranking	–	—	–	3–0	6–0
3	Southampton	4	1	1	0	2	3	6	−3	5		1–2	0–3	—	–	–
4	Bristol City	4	0	0	2	2	3	8	−5	2		–	–	1–1	—	1–1
5	Reading	4	0	1	0	3	1	14	−13	2		0–6	–	0–1	–	—

Updated to match(es) played on 24 January 2024. Source: FA Women's League Cup
Rules for classification: 1) Points; 2) Goal difference; 3) Number of goals scored; 4) Number of wins; 5) Head-to-head record
(Q) Qualified to the phase indicated
11 October 2023
19:30

Bristol City	1–1	Southampton
Ward 34'	Report	Lloyd-Smith 50'
Penalties
Rodgers (penalty missed); Teisar (penalty scored); Ward (penalty scored); Jones (penalty scored); Napier (penalty missed); Aspin (penalty missed)	3–4	(penalty scored) Peake; (penalty missed) Peplow; (penalty scored) Purfield; (penalty missed) Thompson; (penalty scored) Kraft; (penalty scored) Morris

Robins HPC, Failand
Attendance: 597
Referee: Will Finnie
11 October 2023
19:30

Tottenham Hotspur	6–0	Reading
Zhang Linyan 12'; Graham 21'; Ale 47'; Percival 56'; Naz 62'; Thomas 71'	Report

Brisbane Road, Leyton
Attendance: 531
Referee: Amy Fearns

8 November 2023
19:00

Reading	0–1	Southampton
	Report	Lloyd-Smith 85'

Recreation Ground, Aldershot
Attendance: 235
Referee: Stacey Fullicks
9 November 2023
19:00

Arsenal	3–1	Bristol City
Maanum 27'; Wubben-Moy 36'; Blackstenius 90+5'	Report	Struck 70'

Meadow Park, Borehamwood
Attendance: 1,974
Referee: Lisa Benn

22 November 2023
19:30

Tottenham Hotspur	3–0	Bristol City
Graham 19' (pen.); Ayane 29', 72'	Report

Brisbane Road, Leyton
Attendance: 506
Referee: Sunny Singh Gill
23 November 2023
18:30

Southampton	1–2	Arsenal
Pike 55'	Report	Maanum 60'; Ilestedt 90+3'

St Mary's, Southampton
Attendance: 13,438
Referee: Stacey Pearson

13 December 2023
19:00

Arsenal	3–3	Tottenham Hotspur
Blackstenius 19'; Maanum 37'; Turner 68' (o.g.)	Report	Thomas 17'; Naz 30', 48'
Penalties
Russo (penalty scored); Mead (penalty scored); Catley (penalty scored); Foord (penalty missed); Beattie (penalty scored)	4–3	(penalty missed) Naz; (penalty scored) Ayane; (penalty missed) Graham; (penalty scored) Zadorsky; (penalty scored) Petzelberger

Meadow Park, Borehamwood
Attendance: 3,618
Referee: Emily Heaslip
13 December 2023
19:30

Bristol City	1–1	Reading
Hayles 21'	Report	Wellings 86'
Penalties
Rodgers (penalty missed); Jones (penalty scored); Woolley (penalty scored); Hayles (penalty scored); Thestrup (penalty scored); Napier (penalty missed)	4–5	(penalty scored) Troelsgaard; (penalty scored) Wade; (penalty scored) Wellings; (penalty scored) Primmer; (penalty missed) Woodham; (penalty scored) Houssein

Robins HPC, Failand
Attendance: 648

24 January 2024
19:00

Reading	0–6	Arsenal
	Report	Foord 23'; Blackstenius 35', 45', 84'; Codina 51'; Mead 80'

Madejski Stadium, Reading
Attendance: 3,784
Referee: Levi Gray
25 January 2024
19:45

Southampton	0–3	Tottenham Hotspur
	Report	Petzelberger 29'; England 67'; Clinton 78'

Ten Acres, Eastleigh
Attendance: 1,734
Referee: Lisa Benn

=== Group E ===
Pos	Team	Pld	W	PW	PL	L	GF	GA	GD	Pts	Qualification	BHA	CHA	WHU	BIR
1	Brighton & Hove Albion (Q)	3	3	0	0	0	8	2	+6	9	Advanced to knock-out stage	—	–	3–1	–
2	Charlton Athletic	3	1	0	0	2	3	4	−1	3	Possible knock-out stage based on ranking	1–2	—	–	1–0
3	West Ham United	3	1	0	0	2	4	6	−2	3		–	2–1	—	–
4	Birmingham City	3	1	0	0	2	2	5	−3	3		0–3	–	2–1	—

Source: FA Women's League Cup
Rules for classification: 1) Points; 2) Goal difference; 3) Number of goals scored; 4) Number of wins; 5) Head-to-head record
(Q) Qualified to the phase indicated
11 October 2023
19:00

Birmingham City	0–3	Brighton & Hove Albion
	Report	Rule 16'; Robinson 49'; Terland 86'

St Andrew's, Birmingham
Attendance: 588
Referee: Phoebe Cross
11 October 2023
19:00

West Ham United	2–1	Charlton Athletic
Harries 58'; Atkinson 78'	Report	Humphrey 20'

Victoria Road, Dagenham
Attendance: 413
Referee: Lauren Impey

22 November 2023
19:00

Charlton Athletic	1–0	Birmingham City
McGowan 35'	Report

The Oakwood, Bexley
Attendance: 276
Referee: Grace Lowe
22 November 2023
19:00

Brighton & Hove Albion	3–1	West Ham United
Bergsvand 45+1'; Losada 52' (pen.); Sarri 61' (pen.)	Report	Cissoko 89'

Broadfield Stadium, Crawley
Attendance: 845
Referee: Amy Fearns

24 January 2024
19:00

Charlton Athletic	1–2	Brighton & Hove Albion
Green 90+2'	Report	Carabalí 22'; Pinto 38'

The Oakwood, Bexley
Attendance: 365
Referee: Grace Lowe
24 January 2024
19:00

Birmingham City	2–1	West Ham United
Agg 18'; Harris 48'	Report	Ueki 90+1'

St Andrew's, Birmingham
Attendance: 781

=== Ranking of second-placed teams ===
Due to Arsenal's and Manchester United's failure to progress from Champions League qualifying, they entered the League Cup group stage. With only one team receiving a bye to the League Cup quarter-finals, two best-placed runner-up teams progressed with the five group winners to make up the final eight. The ranking to determine which two second-placed teams progressed was calculated on a points-per-game basis.

Pos	Grp	Team	Pld	W	WPEN	LPEN	L	GF	GA	GD	Pts	PPG	Qualification
1	D	Tottenham Hotspur (Q)	4	3	0	1	0	15	3	+12	10	2.50	Advanced to knock-out stage
2	A	Aston Villa (Q)	4	3	0	0	1	17	1	+16	9	2.25	Advanced to knock-out stage
3	B	Manchester United	4	3	0	0	1	12	3	+9	9	2.25	
4	C	Crystal Palace	3	1	0	1	1	5	3	+2	4	1.33	
5	E	Charlton Athletic	3	1	0	0	2	3	4	−1	3	1.00	

(Q) Qualified to the phase indicated

== Knock-out stage ==
Quarter-finals
14 February – Dartford
London City Lionesses	0
Arsenal	4
7 February – Crawley
Brighton & Hove Albion	1 (0)
Aston Villa (pen.)	1 (2)
7 February - Leyton
Tottenham Hotspur	0
Manchester City	1
7 February - Kingston upon Thames
Chelsea	5
Sunderland	0

Semi-finals
6 March – Borehamwood
Arsenal	4
Aston Villa	0
7 March – Manchester
Manchester City	0
Chelsea	1

Final
31 March – Wolverhampton
Arsenal	1
Chelsea	0

=== Quarter-finals ===
Chelsea entered the League Cup at the quarter-final stage, having been exempt from the group stage due to their participation in the Champions League group stage. The draw took place on 29 January 2024. The quarter-finals were played on 7 February 2024.

14 February 2024 (Note: London City Lionesses v Arsenal was postponed due to a waterlogged pitch on 7 February 2024.)
19:00

London City Lionesses (2)	0–4	Arsenal (1)
	Report	Lacasse 39', 57'; Little 45+4' (pen.); Russo 74'

Princes Park, Dartford
Attendance: 3,900
Referee: Lisa Benn

7 February 2024
19:00

Brighton & Hove Albion (1)	1–1 (a.e.t.)	Aston Villa (1)
Sarri 35'	Report	Hanson 69'
Penalties
Losada (penalty missed); Lee (penalty missed); Terland (penalty missed); Olme (penalty missed)	0–2	(penalty missed) Mayling; (penalty scored) Leon; (penalty missed) Corsie; (penalty scored) Patten

Broadfield Stadium, Crawley
Attendance: 1,050
Referee: Lauren Impey

7 February 2024
19:00

Chelsea (1)	5–0	Sunderland (2)
Nüsken 26', 44'; Beever-Jones 46'; Kirby 83', 90+1'	Report

Kingsmeadow, Kingston upon Thames
Attendance: 765
Referee: Phoebe Cross

7 February 2024
19:30

Tottenham Hotspur (1)	0–1	Manchester City (1)
	Report	Hasegawa 34'

Brisbane Road, Leyton
Attendance: 731
Referee: Amy Fearns

=== Semi-finals ===
The draw took place on 9 February 2024. The semi-finals were played on 6 and 7 March 2024.

6 March 2024
19:15

Arsenal (1)	4–0	Aston Villa (1)
Blackstenius 8', 11', 40'; Maanum 18'	Report

Meadow Park, Borehamwood
Attendance: 3,507
Referee: Paul Howard

7 March 2024
19:15

Manchester City (1)	0–1	Chelsea (1)
	Report	James 8'

Academy Stadium, Manchester
Attendance: 3,066
Referee: Andrew Kitchen

=== Final ===
On 15 December 2023, it was announced that the 2024 FA Women's League Cup final would be held at Molineux Stadium, the home of Wolverhampton Wanderers, for the first time. The final took place on 31 March 2024. It was also the first game in the competition's history to use VAR. Following the introduction in the women's fa cup final, the previous year.

31 March 2024
15:00

Arsenal (1)	1–0 (a.e.t.)	Chelsea (1)
Blackstenius 116'	Report

Molineux Stadium, Wolverhampton
Attendance: 21,462
Referee: Cheryl Foster

== Top goalscorers ==
Rank	Player	Club	Goals
1	(Sweden) Stina Blackstenius	Arsenal	9
2	(England) Rachel Daly	Aston Villa	8
3	(England) Nikita Parris	Manchester United	5
4	(Norway) Frida Maanum	Arsenal	4
5	(Wales) Elise Hughes	Crystal Palace	3
5	(England) Chloe Kelly	Manchester City	3
5	(Republic of Ireland) Saoirse Noonan	Durham	3
5	(England) Jessica Naz	Tottenham Hotspur	3
9	16 players		2

== Controversy ==
Aston Villa were docked three points in their group table after finding an illegible player in their game against Sunderland. This altered the standings with Aston Villa, originally first in the group, dropping down to second and Sunderland replacing them at the top. Before the points deduction, Sunderland's performance wasn't sufficient to qualify for the quarter finals as one of the best second place teams; however Aston Villa, now in second place, did qualify as one of the best second place teams. This came at the expense of Manchester United who took the FA's decision to an independent tribunal arguing they should not be dismissed from the quarter finals because a different club broke the competition rules however the tribunal ruled in favour of the FA.

After the final, Chelsea manager Emma Hayes was seen to have shoved Arsenal head coach Jonas Eidevall as they shook hands. Hayes claimed it was due to Eidevall's "unacceptable male aggression" on the touchline after an altercation with Erin Cuthbert during the match. The FA later confirmed that Hayes will not face any action over the incident.
