= Lucy Staniforth =

English former footballer (born 1992)

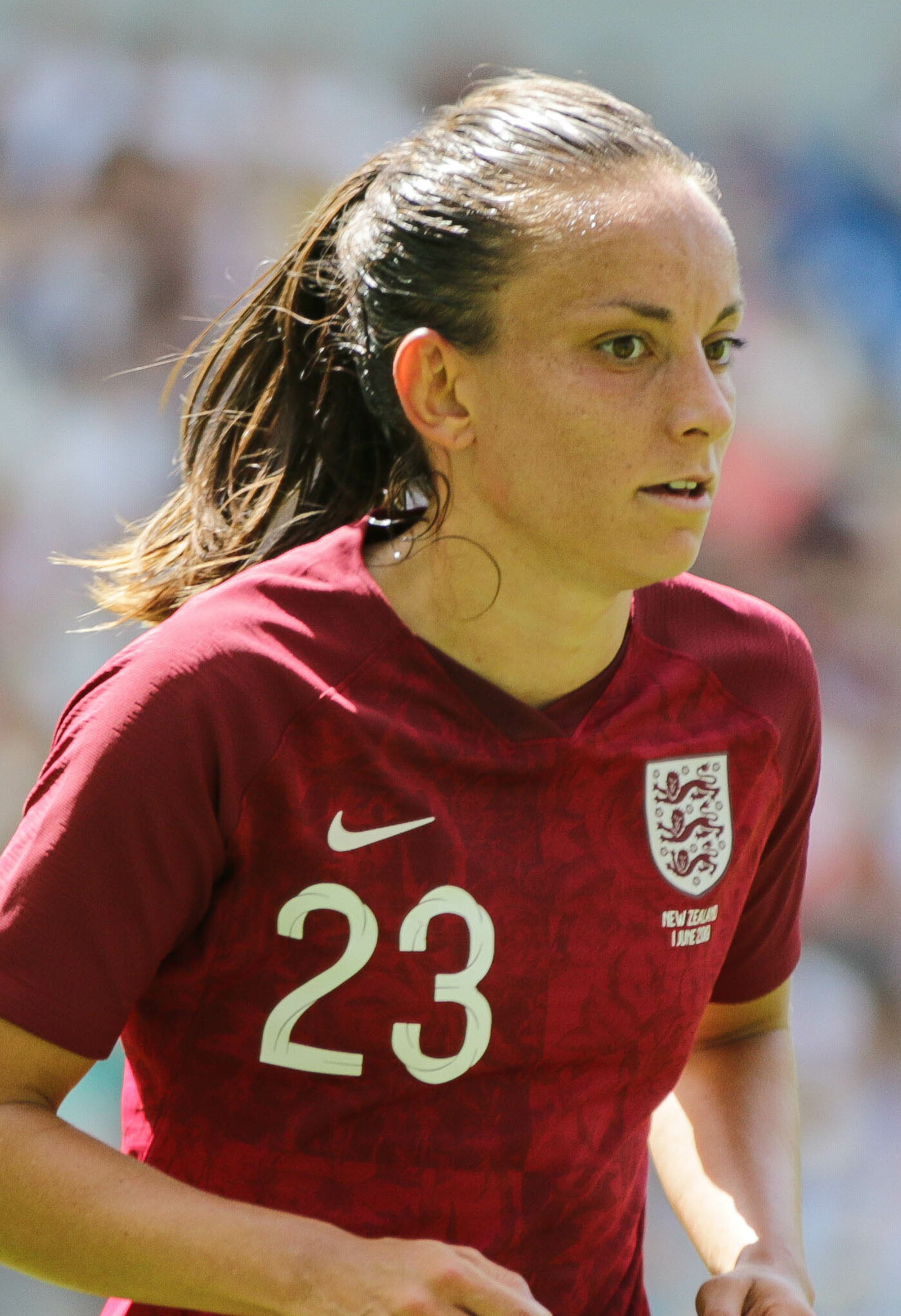
- Staniforth playing for England in 2019

Personal information
- Birth name: Lucy Elizabeth Staniforth
- Date of birth: 2 October 1992 (age 34)
- Place of birth: York, England
- Height: 5 ft 5 in (1.66 m)
- Position: Midfielder

Youth career
- 2004–2007: Blyth Town
- 2006–2008: Sunderland

Senior career*
Years	Team	Apps	(Gls)
2008–2010	Sunderland	24	(2)
2010–2012	Lincoln Ladies	28	(6)
2012–2014	Bristol Academy	3	(1)
2014–2015	Liverpool	11	(0)
2016–2018	Sunderland	37	(4)
2018–2020	Birmingham City	29	(3)
2020–2023	Manchester United	30	(2)
2023–2026	Aston Villa	45	(1)

International career^{‡}
2008–2009	England U17	8	(1)
2009–2010	England U19	12	(2)
2010	England U20	2	(0)
2012–2015	England U23	6	(1)
2018–2022	England	17	(2)
- * Club domestic league appearances and goals as of 7 May 2026 ‡ National team caps and goals as of 23 October 2021

Lucy Elizabeth Staniforth-Wilson (née Staniforth; born 2 October 1992) is an English former professional footballer who played as a midfielder.

Staniforth played for Women's Super League club Aston Villa and the England women's national team.

== Early and personal life ==
Lucy Elizabeth Staniforth was born on 2 October 1992 in York to Sandra and Gordon Staniforth. She had a footballing family: her father was an attacker who played for York City and Hull City, his hometown club, as well as a host of other clubs, and her brother, Thomas, older by twelve years, was a defender for Sheffield Wednesday's reserve and youth sides. Despite this, she credits a primary school PE teacher who was particularly encouraging of the girls to try football for getting her into the sport; she played for her school team and the Copmanthorpe boys' team in York. Thomas died suddenly at the age of 20 in 2001, prompting the family to move to Alnwick in Northumberland shortly afterwards.

Staniforth joined the local school on the same day as future teammate Lucy Bronze, with their houses backing onto each others'. They quickly became friends and played for club and school together; Bronze's mother was a teacher at the local high school, with Staniforth and Bronze allowed to play for the Sixth Form team even when in middle school. The pair attended the Duchess's Community High School together, continuing to play in the team there, with Staniforth later remarking that it was funny how they were so small playing with older students and that "the other schools must have thought [they] were in sixth form for about six years".

During her career, Staniforth has worn the number 37, Thomas' squad number with Sheffield Wednesday. She played a match with Lincoln Ladies on the tenth anniversary of his death, scoring the first goal in their 3–0 victory, and revealed a t-shirt paying tribute to Tom as her celebration.

She is openly lesbian and married her wife, Laura, in December 2022. Bronze and other youth team friends Jordan Nobbs and Demi Stokes were among Staniforth's bridesmaids, though a UEFA Women's Champions League match was scheduled on the same day. In March 2023, she had recently completed a master's degree in football directorship, saying she intended to work for and make successful the Newcastle women's team in the future.

In September 2025 she graduated in the inaugural cohort of students from the PFA Business School, with an award from the University of Portsmouth.

== Club career ==
=== Sunderland ===
==== Youth, 2006–07 ====
Upon moving to Alnwick, Staniforth was too old to continue playing with boys, and her parents were unaware of other opportunities in the area. They were advised to speak with Diane Bronze, a neighbour and advocate for girls' football; Diane suggested Staniforth join Blyth Town's girls' side with her daughter, Lucy Bronze, which she did in about 2004. Blyth Town was impressively organised and gave many opportunities to the girls' team at the time, including sending them on a pre-season tour of the United States. While in high school, Bronze, a year older than Staniforth, joined Sunderland; despite being a fan of rivals Newcastle United and only fourteen, Staniforth also joined the club, saying that she mostly copied whatever Bronze did.

==== First senior stint, 2008–10 ====
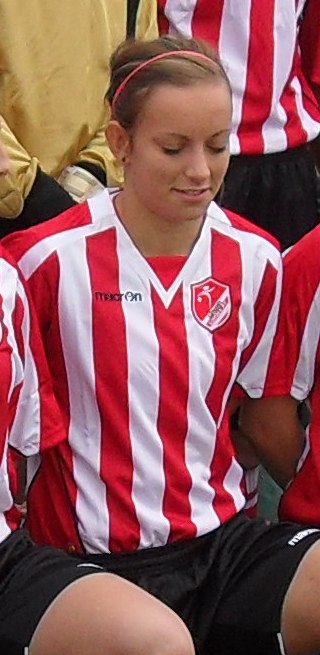
Staniforth in September 2010

From the moment they joined Sunderland, the teenagers were aiming for the first team, which Staniforth began playing for at the age of sixteen. During her early formative years at the club, Staniforth played with players she described as "pivotal in paving the way towards England becoming a top side"; as well as Bronze, Nobbs, and Stokes, this included Jill Scott, Steph Houghton and Carly Telford. In her first season in senior football, she was instrumental in helping Sunderland win the FA Women's Premier League Northern Division and reach the 2009 FA Women's Cup final, where they were beaten 2–1 by Arsenal. The following season, Staniforth figured prominently as a key player in Sunderland's success as they finished fifth in their first season back at the top level.

=== Lincoln Ladies ===
Upon Sunderland's failed bid to join the FA WSL in 2010, Staniforth joined successful applicant, Lincoln Ladies. She started every game in her first season at the club, netting three times. The most notable of her goals in her first season in the Women's Super League came in the away fixture at Doncaster Belles. Staniforth helped her side reach fourth place in the league.

In the 2012 season, Staniforth bettered her goalscoring tally substantially, scoring on a further 6 occasions in all competitions. In the two ultimate games of the season, she scored winning goals for Lincoln: an extravagant lob from 35 yards against Everton Ladies, and against Chelsea Ladies, lifting the side to fifth in the table.

=== Bristol City ===
In December 2012, it was announced that Staniforth would be joining Bristol Academy, against whom she had scored twice in the preceding 2012 FA WSL season. Staniforth scored her first goal for the club in the home fixture against Doncaster Rovers Belles, with a 22-yard drive. In her first season at the Stoke Gifford Stadium, Staniforth reached the second Women's FA Cup final of her career. During the match she suffered a serious knee injury and was stretchered off. After only a short time at the club, Staniforth subsequently spent the remainder of the season sidelined, with plans to return in time for the 2014 season. Bristol ended the season runners-up, losing 2–0 on the final day of the season to champions Liverpool.

=== Liverpool ===
In February 2014, Staniforth joined reigning FA WSL champions Liverpool for a reported five-figure fee. Staniforth sustained an injury during pre-season, this time to the anterior cruciate ligament in her other leg, which put her out of action for the entirety of the 2014 season. Despite Staniforth's injury, Liverpool went on to win the FA WSL title for the second consecutive year.

=== Return to Sunderland ===
In January 2016, Staniforth left Liverpool and returned to Sunderland on a two-year contract.

At the beginning of the 2017 season, Lucy was awarded penalty-taking responsibilities for her club. In both the fifth and sixth round of the Women's FA Cup, against Aston Villa and Chelsea respectively, Staniforth scored from the penalty spot. She then scored on two further occasions in the league, from the spot against her old club Bristol City and directly from a corner against Yeovil Town with the outside of her foot.

Following Stephanie Bannon's retirement, Staniforth was named club captain of Sunderland in July 2017. Staniforth's rich vein of form continued into the 2018 season, scoring against both Sheffield and Liverpool and netting a brace against Aston Villa. In the Fourth Round of the FA Cup against Brighouse Town L.F.C, Lucy scored a second half hat-trick – the first hat-trick of her senior career. In Staniforth's inaugural season as captain, she was awarded Player of the Season for her club and nominated for Goal of the Season at the FAWSL Awards.

=== Birmingham City ===
In 2018, she joined Birmingham City. After two seasons, she left upon the expiry of her contract.

=== Manchester United ===
On 9 July 2020, Staniforth signed a two-year deal with Manchester United. She made her debut on 4 October as a 65th-minute substitute in a 3–0 victory over Brighton & Hove Albion. On 1 August 2022, Staniforth signed a one-year contract extension until the end of the 2022–23 season.

=== Aston Villa ===
On 9 January 2023, Staniforth signed for fellow WSL team Aston Villa on a free transfer following the termination of her Manchester United contract. She joined the rapidly-improving team after having struggled for playing time at Manchester United, and moved into a deeper midfield role, being key in Aston Villa reaching fifth in the league behind the big four. On 14 July 2024 it was announced that Staniforth had signed a contract extension with the club until June 2025. Staniforth signed a further one-year contract extension on 17 July 2025. She made her 50th appearance for Villa, and first start of the 2025–26 season, in a 2–0 FA Cup fourth round loss to Arsenal on 18 January 2026. On the 7th of May, 2026, Staniforth announced her retirement from football at the end of the 2025–26 season.

== International career ==
=== Youth ===
She featured for England in their fourth-place finish at the 2008 FIFA U-17 Women's World Cup in New Zealand, scoring an excellent goal against Japan in the quarter final.

In July 2009 Staniforth competed at the 2009 UEFA Women's Under-19 Championship in Belarus, which England won. In her time with the U-19s, she scored twice. In 2010 Staniforth helped England reach the final of the 2010 UEFA Women's Under-19 Championship in FYR Macedonia, where they lost their title to France. Later that summer Staniforth played in two of England's games at the 2010 FIFA U-20 Women's World Cup in Germany. Staniforth subsequently joined the ranks of the U-23s, making her debut against Norway in February 2012. Staniforth scored an impressive 25-yard drive in the first game of the Under-23 Four Nations La Manga Tournament, helping her team beat Sweden 2–0.

In 2012 she was described by former England coach Mark Sampson as "one of the best young players in Europe".

=== Senior ===
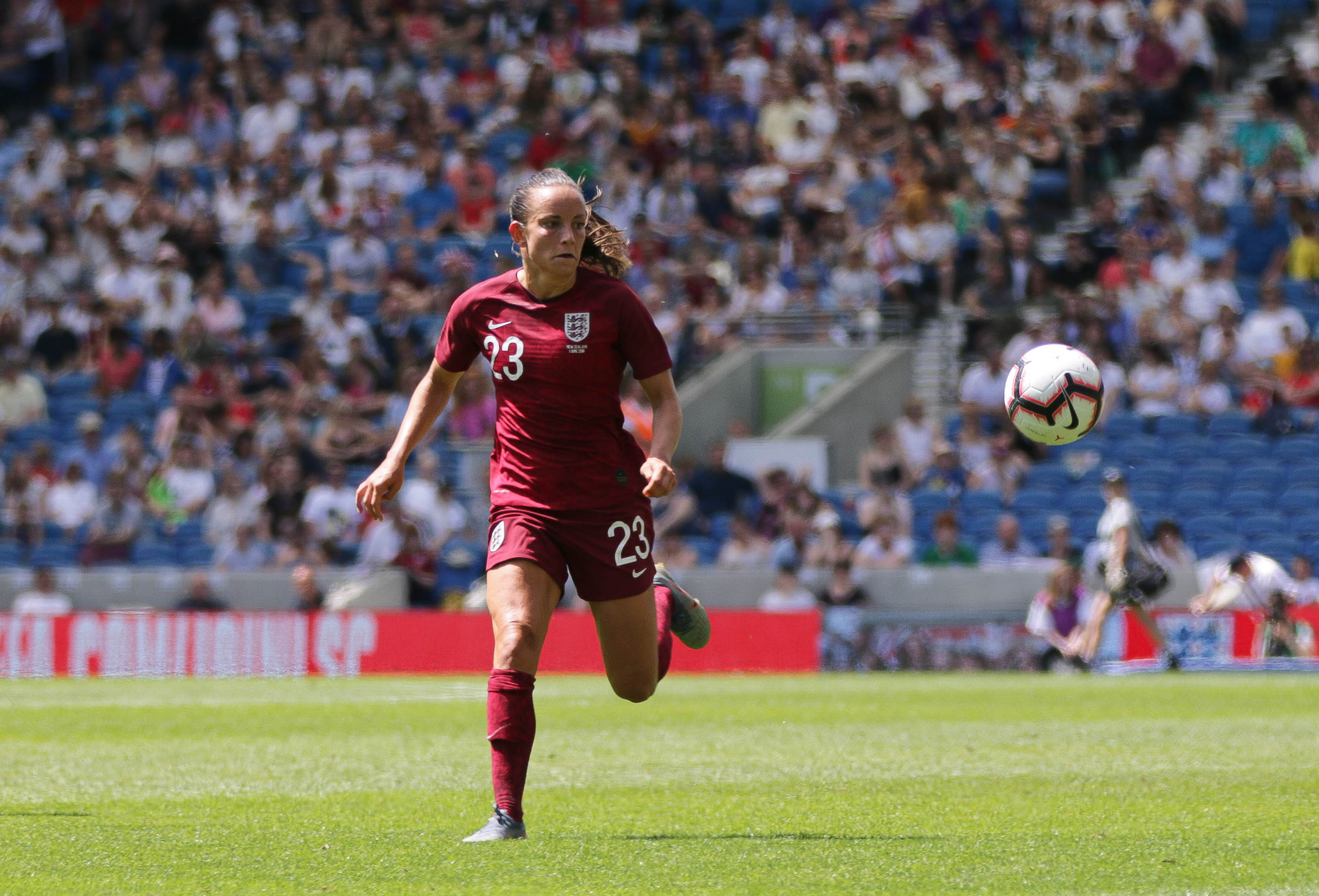
Staniforth during a match against New Zealand, June 2019

Staniforth earned her first call up to the senior England squad for the 2019 FIFA Women's World Cup qualifying match against Russia at Sapsan Arena in Moscow on 8 June 2018. She gained her first cap on 4 September 2018 in a 2019 FIFA Women's World Cup qualifying match against Kazakhstan, scoring on her debut in the 66th minute. Staniforth scored the opening goal in the ultimate game of the 2019 SheBelieves Cup, helping the Lionesses beat Japan 3–0 and win the international tournament for the first time.

On 8 May 2019, Staniforth was called up to the England 23-player squad for the 2019 FIFA Women's World Cup in France.

Staniforth was the 208th player to represent the England women's team, with this given as her legacy number by FA to honour the teams' 50th anniversary.

Staniforth was included in England's 28-player preliminary squad for UEFA Women's Euro 2022, but was not selected for the final squad. The following year, she was a late addition to the standby list for the 2023 FIFA Women's World Cup, replacing the injured Jess Park.

== Career statistics ==
=== Club ===
As of 5 October 2024

Appearances and goals by club, season and competition
Club	Season	League			FA Cup		League Cup		Continental		Total	
Club	Season	Division	Apps	Goals	Apps	Goals	Apps	Goals	Apps	Goals	Apps	Goals
Sunderland	2008–09	WPL Northern	6	2	0	0	0	0	—		6	2
Sunderland	2009–10	WPL National	18	0	0	0	2	1	—		20	1
Sunderland	Total		24	2	0	0	2	1	—		26	3
Lincoln Ladies	2011	FA WSL	14	3	1	0	0	0	—		15	3
Lincoln Ladies	2012	FA WSL	14	3	1	0	4	2	—		19	5
Lincoln Ladies	Total		28	6	2	0	4	2	—		34	8
Bristol Academy	2013	FA WSL	3	1	2	0	3	0	—		8	1
Liverpool	2014	FA WSL	0	0	0	0	0	0	—		0	0
Liverpool	2015	FA WSL	11	0	0	0	6	1	2	0	19	1
Liverpool	Total		11	0	0	0	6	1	2	0	19	1
Sunderland	2016	FA WSL	12	0	3	0	1	0	—		16	0
Sunderland	2017	FA WSL	8	1	2	2	—		—		10	3
Sunderland	2017–18	FA WSL	17	3	2	4	5	3	—		24	10
Sunderland	Total		37	4	7	6	6	3	—		50	13
Birmingham City	2018–19	FA WSL	19	2	1	0	6	2	—		26	4
Birmingham City	2019–20	FA WSL	10	1	2	2	4	2	—		16	5
Birmingham City	Total		29	3	3	2	10	4	—		42	9
Manchester United	2020–21	WSL	14	0	2	1	2	0	—		18	1
Manchester United	2021–22	WSL	12	2	0	0	4	0	—		16	2
Manchester United	2022–23	WSL	4	0	0	0	3	0	—		7	0
Manchester United	Total		30	2	2	1	9	0	—		41	3
Aston Villa	2022–23	WSL	13	1	4	0	0	0	—		17	1
Aston Villa	2023–24	WSL	11	0	1	0	3	0	—		15	0
Aston Villa	2024–25	WSL	9	0	2	0	1	0	—		4	0
Aston Villa	Total		33	1	7	0	4	0	—		44	1
Career total			198	19	23	9	44	11	2	0	256	39

=== International ===
As of match played 6 June 2019. England score listed first, score column indicates score after each Staniforth goal.

International goals by date, venue, opponent, score, result and competition
No.	Date	Venue	Opponent	Score	Result	Competition	Ref.
1	4 September 2018	Ortaliq Stadion, Pavlodar, Kazakhstan	Kazakhstan	4–0	6–0	2019 FIFA World Cup qualification	
2	5 March 2019	Raymond James Stadium, Tampa Bay, United States	Japan	1–0	3–0	2019 SheBelieves Cup	

== Honours ==
Sunderland

- FA Women's Premier League Northern Division: 2008–09
- FA Cup runner-up: 2009

Bristol Academy

- FA WSL runner-up: 2013
- FA Cup runner-up: 2013

Liverpool

- FA WSL: 2014

England

- SheBelieves Cup: 2019

Individual

- Sunderland Ladies Player of the Year: 2018
- Sunderland Ladies Team of the Decade XI: 2010s

== See also ==
- List of England women's international footballers
- FA WSL records and statistics
