= 2020–21 Manchester United W.F.C. season =

Manchester United Women
2020–21 season
- Co-chairmen: Joel and Avram Glazer
- Manager: Casey Stoney
- Stadium: Leigh Sports Village
- FA WSL: 4th
- FA Cup: Fifth round
- League Cup: Group stage
- Top goalscorer: League: Ella Toone (9); All: Ella Toone (10)
Home colours	Away colours	Third colours
- All statistics correct as of 16 May 2021.

The 2020–21 season was Manchester United Women's third season since they were founded and their second in the FA Women's Super League, the professional top-flight women's league in England. The club also competed in the FA Cup and League Cup.

In March 2021, it was announced the team would make their Old Trafford debut in a league match against West Ham United despite fans not yet allowed to return to stadiums due to the ongoing COVID-19 pandemic. Manchester United won the game 2–0.

On 12 May 2021, it was announced Casey Stoney would be stepping down as manager at the end of the season amid tensions surrounding the lack of backing and resources from the club, particularly training facilities.

== Pre-season ==
Manchester United returned to preseason training on 24 July 2020. On 9 August, they played their first preseason friendly, hosting SWPL champions Glasgow City who were preparing for the restart of the 2019–20 UEFA Women's Champions League.

Date	Opponents	H / A	Result F–A	Scorers	Attendance
9 August 2020	Glasgow City	H	4–0	Toone 4', Sigsworth (2) 73', 80', Hanson 88'	0
16 August 2020	Blackburn Rovers	H	Behind closed doors, no official scoreline		
23 August 2020	Aston Villa	H	Behind closed doors, no official scoreline		
30 August 2020	Liverpool	H	0–0		0

== FA Women's Super League ==
=== Matches ===
Date	Opponents	H / A	Result F–A	Scorers	Attendance	League position
6 September 2020	Chelsea	H	1–1	Galton 79'	0	6th
13 September 2020	Birmingham City	A	5–2	Ross 5', Zelem 36', Toone 47', Hanson (2) 60', 79'	0	4th
4 October 2020	Brighton & Hove Albion	H	3–0	Toone 9' (pen.), Russo 69', Ross 90+2'	0	4th
10 October 2020	Tottenham Hotspur	A	1–0	M. Turner 67'	0	1st
18 October 2020	West Ham United	A	4–2	Russo (2) 20', 42', Heath 23', Press 87'	0	3rd
8 November 2020	Arsenal	H	1–0	Toone 83'	0	1st
14 November 2020	Manchester City	H	2–2	Heath 54', Hanson 74'	0	1st
5 December 2020	Aston Villa	A	2–0	Galton 25', Toone 89'	0	1st
13 December 2020	Reading	A	2–1	Galton 32', Ladd 83'	623	1st
20 December 2020	Bristol City	H	6–1	Galton (2) 26', 63', M. Turner 45+2', Sigsworth 52', Heath (2) 83', 86'	0	1st
17 January 2021	Chelsea	A	1–2	James 61'	0	2nd
24 January 2021	Birmingham City	H	2–0	Galton 46', Toone 81'	0	1st
31 January 2021 (Note: Rescheduled from 10 January 2021 due to positive COVID-19 cases in the Everton squad.)	Everton	A	2–0	Toone 9', Press 42'	0	2nd
7 February 2021	Reading	H	0–2		0	2nd
12 February 2021	Manchester City	A	0–3		0	3rd
7 March 2021	Aston Villa	H	3–0	Hanson 27', Sigsworth 43', Zelem 73'	0	3rd
19 March 2021	Arsenal	A	0–2		0	3rd
27 March 2021	West Ham United	H	2–0	James 49', Press 55'	0	3rd
4 April 2021	Brighton & Hove Albion	A	0–1		0	4th
25 April 2021	Tottenham Hotspur	H	4–1	Toone 9', 48' (pen.), Press 19', Sigsworth 31'	0	4th
2 May 2021	Bristol City	A	1–0	Daniëls 79' (o.g.)	0	4th
9 May 2021	Everton	H	2–0	Toone 6', Hanson 89'	0	4th

=== Table ===
Pos	Team	Pld	W	D	L	GF	GA	GD	Pts	Qualification or relegation
2	Manchester City	22	17	4	1	65	13	+52	55	Qualification for the Champions League second round
3	Arsenal	22	15	3	4	63	15	+48	48	Qualification for the Champions League first round
4	Manchester United	22	15	2	5	44	20	+24	47	
5	Everton	22	9	5	8	39	30	+9	32	
6	Brighton & Hove Albion	22	8	3	11	21	41	−20	27	

Source: FA WSL
Rules for classification: 1) Points; 2) Goal difference; 3) Number of goals scored.

== Women's FA Cup ==
As a member of the top two tiers, United will enter the FA Cup in the fourth round proper, originally scheduled to take place on 31 January 2021. The round was ultimately rescheduled for 18 April following the suspension of the competition at the second round stage on 4 January in response to the COVID-19 pandemic. United were drawn away to Burnley, the first competitive match against a team outside of the top two divisions since the team's creation in 2018. Having progressed to the fifth round with a 6–0 win over Burnley, United were eliminated by 2020–21 Championship winners Leicester City 3–2 on 16 May 2021, Casey Stoney's last game in charge of the team.

Date	Round	Opponents	H / A	Result F–A	Scorers	Attendance
18 April 2021	Round 4	Burnley	A	6–0	M. Turner 11', Toone 16', Staniforth 29', A. Turner 44', Hanson (2) 47', 58'	0
16 May 2021	Round 5	Leicester City	H	2–3	Sigsworth 32', Ross 59'	0

== FA Women's League Cup ==
=== Group stage ===
In a change of format to reduce the number of group stage games by two, the League Cup was expanded into six regional groups instead of four, with the six group winners plus the two best second place teams qualifying for the knockout round. Manchester United were entered into Group C for the 2020–21 League Cup alongside fellow WSL teams Everton and Manchester City, and Championship side Liverpool. After losing the opening round fixture to Liverpool, United's second game against Everton was postponed due to safety concerns following overnight wind damage to the stadium. On 19 November, United contested their first penalty shoot-out following a goalless draw with City to determine which side would get the bonus point per competition rules. United successfully scored all four of their penalties (Toone, Groenen, Millie Turner and Ladd) while an Emily Ramsey save on Laura Coombs' second penalty set up a decisive fifth attempt for City which was duly missed by former United captain Alex Greenwood. Despite earning the bonus point, failing to win meant United could not progress to the knockout stage of the League Cup for the first time having reached the semi-finals the previous two seasons. The rearranged third fixture was scheduled for 16 December with opponents Everton still potentially able to qualify as one of the best second-place teams.

Date	Opponents	H / A	Result F–A	Scorers	Attendance	Group position
7 October 2020	Liverpool	A	1–3	McManus 28'	0	4th
4 November 2020	Everton	A	Postponed due to stadium safety concerns			
19 November 2020	Manchester City	H	0–0 (4–3 p)		0	4th
16 December 2020	Everton	A	0–1		0	4th

Pos	Team	Pld	W	WPEN	LPEN	L	GF	GA	GD	Pts	Qualification	MCI	EVE	LIV	MNU
1	Manchester City	3	2	0	1	0	6	1	+5	7	Advanced to knock-out stage	—	3–1	—	—
2	Everton	3	2	0	0	1	3	3	0	6	Possible knock-out stage based on ranking	—	—	1–0	1–0
3	Liverpool	3	1	0	0	2	3	5	−2	3		0–3	—	—	3–1
4	Manchester United	3	0	1	0	2	1	4	−3	2		0–0	—	—	—

Source: thefa.com
Rules for classification: 1) Points; 2) Goal difference; 3) Number of goals scored; 4) Number of wins; 5) Head-to-head record

== Squad statistics ==
As of 16 May 2021
Numbers in brackets denote appearances as substitute.
Key to positions: GK – Goalkeeper; DF – Defender; MF – Midfielder; FW – Forward

No.	Pos.	Name	League		FA Cup		League Cup		Total		Discipline	
No.	Pos.	Name	Apps	Goals	Apps	Goals	Apps	Goals	Apps	Goals	Yellow card	Red card
1	GK	(England) Emily Ramsey	0	0	0	0	2	0	2	0	0	0
2	DF	(England) Martha Harris	4(3)	0	1	0	0	0	5(3)	0	1	0
3	DF	(Sweden) Lotta Ökvist	1(2)	0	0	0	1	0	2(2)	0	1	0
3	DF	(Norway) Maria Thorisdottir	4(2)	0	1(1)	0	0	0	5(3)	0	1	0
4	DF	(England) Amy Turner	19(2)	0	1	1	2	0	22(2)	1	4	0
5	DF	(England) Abbie McManus	5	0	0	0	2	1	7	1	0	0
7	FW	(England) Ella Toone	21(1)	9	1(1)	1	1(2)	0	23(4)	10	2	0
9	FW	(England) Jessica Sigsworth	6(8)	3	2	1	1(1)	0	9(9)	4	3	0
10	MF	(England) Katie Zelem (c)	16(2)	2	2	0	2(1)	0	20(3)	2	3	0
11	FW	(England) Leah Galton	15(2)	6	1	0	2(1)	0	18(3)	6	0	0
12	MF	(Wales) Hayley Ladd	12(6)	1	0	0	2(1)	0	14(7)	1	4	0
13	FW	(Brazil) Ivana Fuso	0(5)	0	0	0	0(1)	0	0(6)	0	0	0
14	MF	(Netherlands) Jackie Groenen	18(4)	0	0	0	3	0	21(4)	0	2	0
16	MF	(England) Lauren James	5(5)	2	0	0	1	0	6(5)	2	0	0
17	DF	(Spain) Ona Batlle	19	0	1(1)	0	2	0	22(1)	0	1	0
18	FW	(Scotland) Kirsty Hanson	11(9)	5	2	2	1(2)	0	14(11)	7	0	0
19	FW	(Scotland) Jane Ross	3(9)	2	2	1	2	0	7(9)	3	0	0
20	DF	(Scotland) Kirsty Smith	11(2)	0	2	0	1	0	14(2)	0	0	0
21	DF	(England) Millie Turner	22	2	2	1	3	0	27	3	1	0
22	GK	(England) Fran Bentley	0	0	0(1)	0	0	0	0(1)	0	0	0
23	FW	(England) Alessia Russo	3(1)	3	0	0	1	0	4(1)	3	0	0
24	FW	(United States) Christen Press	12(2)	4	0(1)	0	0(2)	0	12(5)	4	2	0
26	FW	(England) Megan Hornby	0	0	0	0	0	0	0	0	0	0
27	GK	(England) Mary Earps	22	0	2	0	1	0	25	0	0	0
28	MF	(Wales) Carrie Jones	0(2)	0	0(2)	0	0	0	0(4)	0	0	0
32	DF	(England) Tara Bourne	0	0	0(1)	0	0	0	0(1)	0	0	0
37	MF	(England) Lucy Staniforth	6(8)	0	2	1	1(1)	0	9(9)	1	2	0
77	FW	(United States) Tobin Heath	7(1)	4	0	0	2(1)	0	9(2)	4	1	0
Own goals			—	1	—	—	—	—	—	1	—	—

== Transfers ==
=== In ===
Date	Pos.	Name	From	Ref.
21 June 2020	MF	(Wales) Carrie Jones	(Wales) Cardiff City	
9 July 2020	MF	(England) Lucy Staniforth	(England) Birmingham City	
13 July 2020	DF	(Spain) Ona Batlle	(Spain) Levante	
14 July 2020	FW	(Brazil) Ivana Fuso	(Switzerland) FC Basel	
9 September 2020	FW	(United States) Tobin Heath	(United States) Portland Thorns	
9 September 2020	FW	(United States) Christen Press	(United States) Utah Royals	
10 September 2020	FW	(England) Alessia Russo	(United States) North Carolina Tar Heels	
22 January 2021	DF	(Norway) Maria Thorisdottir	(England) Chelsea	

=== Out ===
Date	Pos.	Name	To	Ref.
3 June 2020	GK	(Norway) Aurora Mikalsen	(England) Tottenham Hotspur (Note: Released, joined Tottenham Hotspur on 27 July 2020)	
7 June 2020	DF	(Scotland) Charlotte Newsham	(England) Blackburn Rovers (Note: Released, joined Blackburn Rovers on 11 August 2020)	
8 June 2020	MF	(England) Aimee Palmer	(England) Bristol City (Note: Released, joined Bristol City on 2 July 2020)	
11 June 2020	FW	(Scotland) Lizzie Arnot	(Scotland) Rangers (Note: Released, joined Rangers on 31 July 2020)	
15 July 2020	GK	(England) Siobhan Chamberlain	Retired (Note: Released, retired on 4 September 2020)	
4 September 2020	MF	(England) Mollie Green	(England) Birmingham City (Note: Released, joined Birmingham City on 7 September 2020)	
14 January 2021	DF	(Sweden) Lotta Ökvist	(Sweden) Kopparbergs/Göteborg FC	

=== Loans out ===
Date from	Date to	Pos.	Name	To	Ref.
1 September 2020	13 December 2020	GK	(England) Fran Bentley	(England) Blackburn Rovers	
7 October 2020	30 June 2021	FW	(England) Maria Edwards	(England) Blackburn Rovers	
21 January 2021	30 June 2021	DF	(England) Abbie McManus	(England) Tottenham Hotspur	
7 March 2021	24 April 2021	GK	(England) Emily Ramsey	(England) West Ham United	
