= Kirsty Hanson =

Association football player (born 1998)

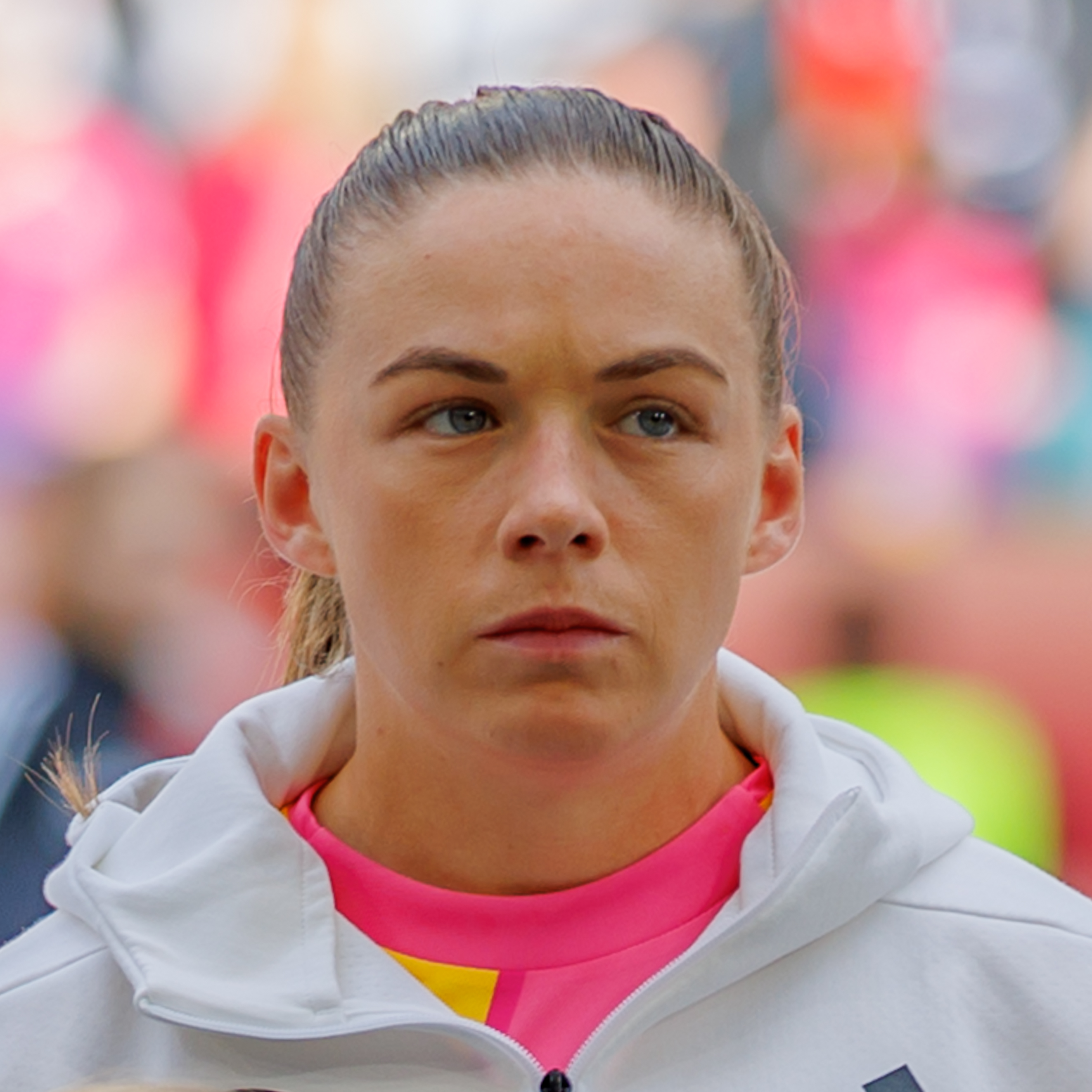
- Hanson with Scotland in 2025

Personal information
- Full name: Kirsty Rae Hanson
- Date of birth: 17 April 1998 (age 28)
- Place of birth: Halifax, England
- Height: 5 ft 4 in (1.63 m)
- Position: Forward

Team information
- Current team: Tottenham Hotspur
- Number: 16

Youth career
- –2015: Manchester United
- 2015–2016: Liverpool

Senior career*
Years	Team	Apps	(Gls)
2016	Sheffield F.C.	8	(0)
2017–2018	Doncaster Rovers Belles	27	(12)
2018–2023	Manchester United	65	(19)
2022–2023	→ Aston Villa (loan)	20	(7)
2023–2026	Aston Villa	57	(15)
2026–	Tottenham Hotspur	2	(2)

International career^{‡}
2015	Scotland U17	5	(0)
2015–2017	Scotland U19	14	(8)
2019–	Scotland	50	(6)
- * Club domestic league appearances and goals as of 07:50, 14 September 2026 (UTC) ‡ National team caps and goals as of 15 October 2026

Kirsty Rae Hanson (born 17 April 1998) is a professional footballer who plays as a forward for English Women's Super League club Tottenham Hotspur. Born in England, she plays for the Scotland national team. Hanson began her career in the youth ranks of Manchester United before spending a year with the Liverpool Development Squad. She made her senior debut with Sheffield FC before joining Doncaster Rovers Belles in late 2016. Hanson returned to Manchester United in July 2018, following the introduction of a senior team at the club.

== Club career ==
=== Liverpool ===
Hanson was born in Halifax, West Yorkshire, and has a brother. She began playing football around the age of five, and played with the local boy's team Warley Blues before joining West Riding Bradford's Centre of Excellence and Huddersfield Town. Hanson spent her early years in the Manchester United Centre of Excellence, before joining Liverpool's reserve team due to the lack of opportunity to progress with her former club, who did not have a senior team.

In June 2016, Hanson joined WSL 2 club Sheffield F.C. on loan for the remainder of the season.

=== Doncaster Rovers Belles ===
In December 2016, Hanson became the Doncaster Rovers Belles' first signing ahead of the FA WSL 2 Spring Series, where the team came second and were able to apply for promotion to the WSL. The Belles missed out on promotion to Everton, and remained in the WSL 2.

She became a key figure for the squad's 2017–18 FA WSL 2 win, scoring 11 times, including three braces.

=== Manchester United ===
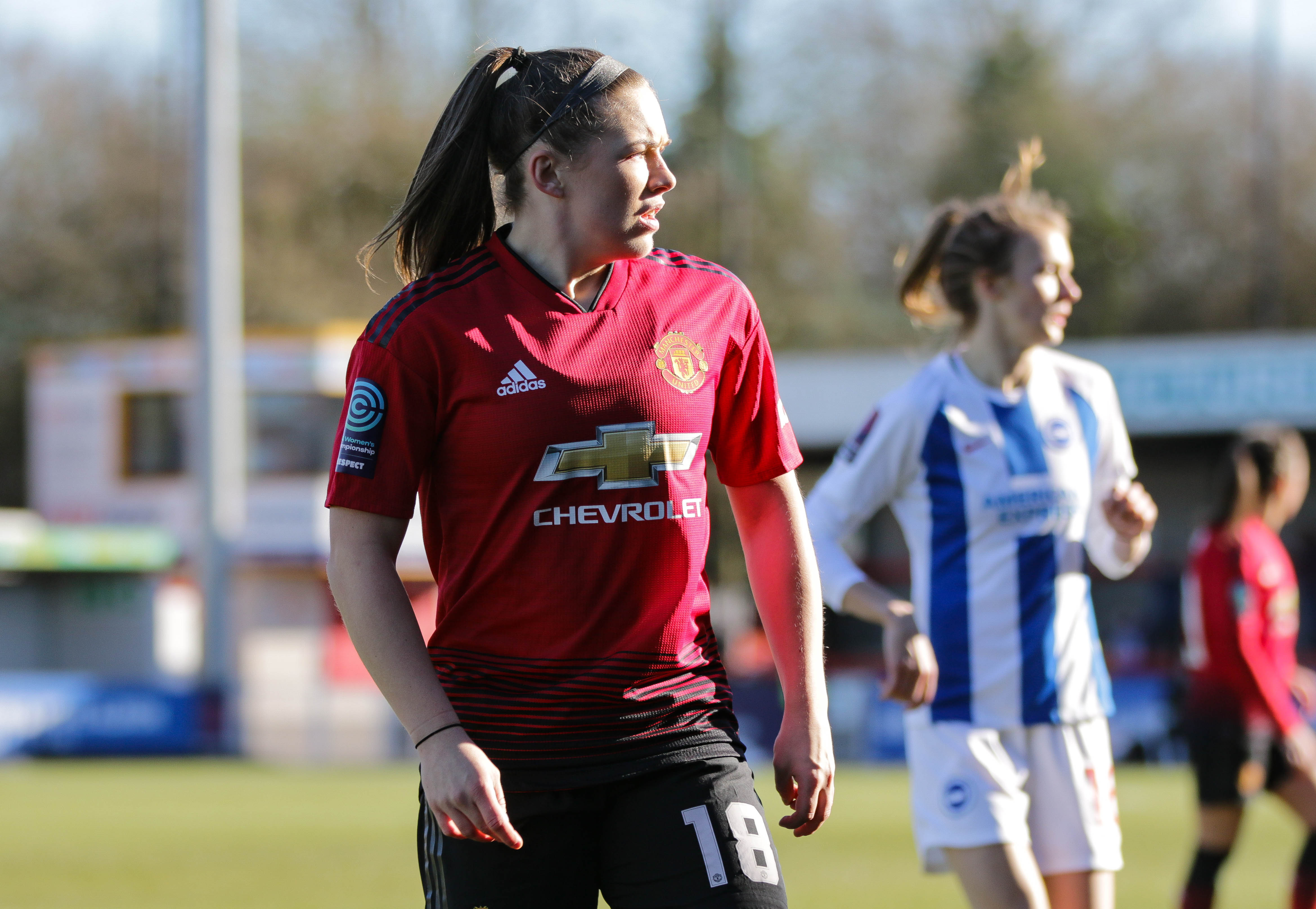
Playing for Manchester United in February 2019

On 1 July 2018, Hanson joined the newly-formed Manchester United to compete in the FA Women's Championship, one of seven players to return to the senior side having played for the club at youth level. She made her club debut on 19 August in a 1–0 Continental Cup victory against her former club Liverpool, and marked her league debut with a brace in a 12–0 win against Aston Villa. Manchester United were promoted to the Women's Super League at the end of the 2018–19 season. Hanson made her first start of the 2019–20 season against Tottenham Hotspur on 13 October 2019, scoring the first goal as United won 3–0. She was named FA WSL Player of the Month in October 2019.

Ahead of the 2020–21 season, Hanson signed a one-year contract extension with an option for a further year. On 3 February 2021, Hanson signed a new deal with Manchester United until 2024 with the option to extend it for a further year.

=== Aston Villa ===
On 8 September 2022, Hanson joined fellow WSL side Aston Villa on loan for the 2022–23 season.

On 11 August 2023, Aston Villa signed Hanson permanently on a two-year deal with the option to extend for a further year. In the 2023–24 FA Women's League Cup quarter-final against Brighton & Hove Albion, Hanson scored the equaliser for Villa. Aston Villa advanced to the semi-final on penalties. She was named Villa's Player's Player of the Season for her performance across the 2023–24 campaign.

In March 2025, during a 3–1 defeat to Crystal Palace, Hanson made her 100th appearance in the WSL. On 18 July 2025, it was announced that Hanson's contract had been extended to June 2027. Her goal in a 2–0 win against West Ham on 5 October 2025 was named WSL Goal of the Month. In May 2026, it was named Barclay's Goal of the Season.

On 17 June 2026, Villa announced Hanson's departure after 4 seasons at the club.

=== Tottenham Hotspur ===
Upon her departure from Aston Villa, it was announced that Hanson had signed a long-term contract with Tottenham Hotspur.

== International career ==
Hanson was eligible to represent England, having been born in Halifax, and Scotland, where her mother was born.

She played for Scotland at the under-17 and under-19 levels, and scored their only goal at the 2017 UEFA Women's Under-19 Championship during a 1–1 draw against host nation Northern Ireland.

In November 2019, after Martha Thomas was forced to withdraw through injury, Hanson received her first senior call-up to the Scotland national team for a UEFA Women's Euro 2021 qualifying match against Albania. She made her debut in the 5–0 victory on 8 November and was named Player of the Match. Hanson scored her first international goal on 19 February 2021 during a 10–0 UEFA Euro 2022 qualifying victory against Cyprus.

== Personal life ==
Hanson has a cocker spaniel named Hugo. She is in a relationship with Sutton United player Amber Taylor.

Hanson has a degree in sports coaching from Leeds Beckett University.

== Career statistics ==
=== Club ===
As of match played 6 September 2026

Appearances and goals by club, season and competition
Club	Season	League			FA Cup (Note: Includes the FA Women's Cup)		League Cup (Note: Includes the WSL Cup/Women's League Cup)		Total	
Club	Season	Division	Apps	Goals	Apps	Goals	Apps	Goals	Apps	Goals
Sheffield F.C.	2016	Women's Super League 2	8	0	0	0	2	0	10	0
Doncaster Rovers Belles	2017	Women's Super League 2	9	3	1	0	0	0	10	3
Doncaster Rovers Belles	2017–18	Women's Super League 2	18	11	0	0	4	1	22	12
Doncaster Rovers Belles	Total		35	14	1	0	6	1	42	15
Manchester United	2018–19	Women's Championship	17	5	3	0	6	0	26	5
Manchester United	2019–20	Women's Super League	11	3	1	0	4	0	16	3
Manchester United	2020–21	Women's Super League	20	5	2	2	3	0	25	7
Manchester United	2021–22	Women's Super League	17	1	1	0	5	0	23	1
Manchester United	Total		65	14	7	2	18	0	90	16
Aston Villa (loan)	2022–23	Women's Super League	20	7	4	0	4	1	28	8
Aston Villa	2023–24	Women's Super League	16	0	1	0	5	1	22	1
Aston Villa	2024–25	Women's Super League	19	3	3	1	2	1	24	5
Aston Villa	2025–26	Women's Super League	22	12	1	0	3	0	26	12
Aston Villa	Total		77	22	9	1	14	3	100	26
Tottenham Hotspur	2026–27	Women's Super League	2	2	0	0	0	0	2	2
Career total			179	52	17	3	38	4	234	59

=== International ===
As of 13 October 2026

Scotland
Year	Apps	Goals
2019	1	0
2020	3	0
2021	6	1
2022	3	0
2023	13	1
2024	10	2
2025	8	1
2026	6	1
Total	50	6

=== International goals ===
As of match played 2 December 2025. Scotland score listed first, score column indicates score after each Hanson goal.

No.	Date	Cap	Venue	Opponent	Score	Result	Competition
1	19 February 2021	5	AEK Arena, Larnaca, Cyprus	Cyprus	4–0	10–0	UEFA Euro 2022 qualifying
2	22 September 2023	21	Stadium of Light, Sunderland, England	England	1–2	1–2	2023–24 UEFA Nations League A
3	31 May 2024	29	Hampden Park, Glasgow, Scotland	Israel	2–0	4–1	UEFA Euro 2025 qualifying
4	16 July 2024	32	Firhill Stadium, Glasgow, Scotland	Serbia	1–0	1–0	UEFA Euro 2025 qualifying
5	2 December 2025	44	Estadio Municipal de Chapín, Jerez de la Frontera, Spain	China	2–0	3–2	Friendly
6	5 June 2026	47	Bozsik Aréna, Budapest, Hungary	Israel	6–0	6–0	2027 FIFA Women's World Cup qualification

== Honours ==
Doncaster Rovers Belles

- FA WSL 2: 2017–18

Manchester United

- FA Women's Championship: 2018–19

Individual

- FA Women's Super League Player of the Month: October 2019
- Barclays WSL Goal of the Season: 2025–26

Aston Villa

- Aston Villa Players Player of The Year: 2023–24
- FA Women's Super League Goal of the Month: October 2025
