= Izzy Groves =

Jamaican footballer

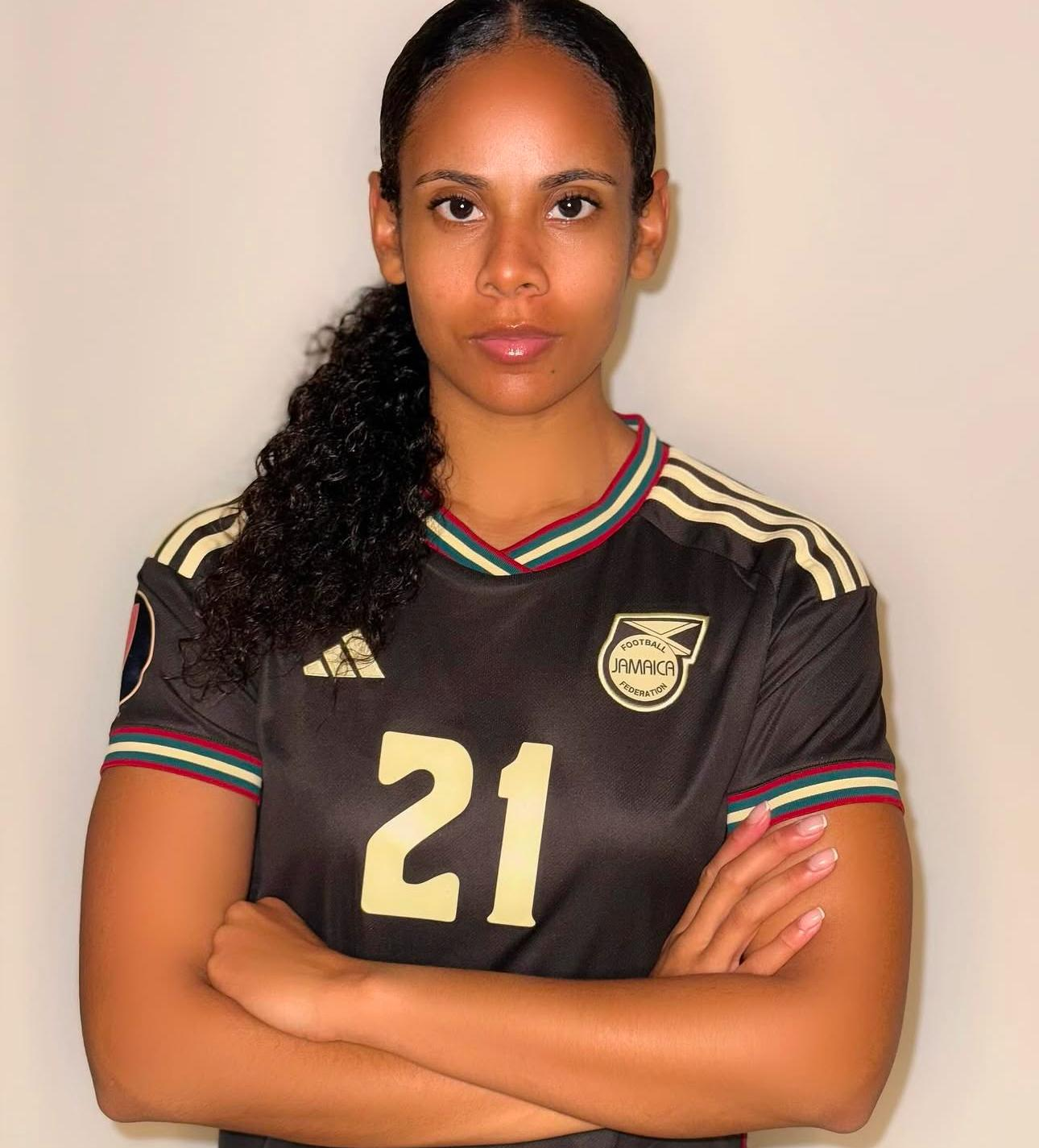
- Groves in 2023

Personal information
- Full name: Israela Alicia Groves
- Date of birth: 7 June 1999 (age 27)
- Place of birth: Pickering, Ontario, Canada
- Height: 5 ft 10 in (1.78 m)
- Position: Midfielder

Team information
- Current team: Hồ Chí Minh City
- Number: 70

College career
Years	Team	Apps	(Gls)
2016–2019	Roberts Wesleyan University	65	(15)

Senior career*
Years	Team	Apps	(Gls)
2020–2022	Vilaverdense	23	(3)
2022–2023	US Saint-Malo	23	(0)
2023–2024	London City Lionesses	9	(0)
2025	Athlone Town	15	(0)
2026–	Hồ Chí Minh City	0	(0)

International career
2023–	Jamaica	2	(0)
- * Club domestic league appearances and goals

Israela Alicia "Izzy" Groves (born 7 June 1999) is a professional footballer who currently plays for Vietnamese club Hồ Chí Minh City. Born in Canada, she represents Jamaica at international level.

== Club career ==
Groves grew up in Pickering, Ontario, Canada, a suburb of Toronto, as the daughter of Harbour View F.C. club-legend and Jamaican international Hubert 'Junior' Groves. From 2016 to 2019 she played for the Roberts Wesleyan University Redhawks, graduating in 2020 with a degree in biology. She served as team captain in 2019, earned all-conference honors and helped the team reach the NCCAA D-1 Final 4.

In 2020, she signed with Vilaverdense in the Portuguese Second Division. In her first season, during which she led the team in scoring, Vilaverdense went undefeated and earned promotion to the First Division. The team then finished 8th in 2021-22.

For the 2022–23 season, Groves played for US Saint-Malo in the French second division. She appeared in 23 matches for the club.

On 2 September 2023, Groves signed with the London City Lionesses on a free transfer for the 2023–24 season.

In March 2026, Groves signed a short-term deal with Vietnamese club Hồ Chí Minh City to compete in the AFC Women's Champions League knockout stage.

== International career ==
Groves trained with the Jamaican national team in Florida in early 2023. She received several call-ups to the squad during the year, but was prevented on the first two occasions by delays in obtaining a Jamaican passport, and on the third occasion in October 2023 by injury. She finally was able to join the team in November 2023 for the W Gold Cup qualifiers, debuting against Panama on November 30, starting both games and assisting Jamaica's equalizer against Guatemala on 3 December 2023.
