= Anna Patten =

Association football player (born 1999)

- Patten in 2026

Personal information
- Full name: Anna Rose Patten
- Date of birth: 20 April 1999 (age 27)
- Place of birth: Harpenden, England
- Height: 1.78 m (5 ft 10 in)
- Position: Defender

Team information
- Current team: Aston Villa
- Number: 4

Youth career
- Arsenal

College career
Years	Team	Apps	(Gls)
2017–2018	Florida State Seminoles	41	(4)
2019–2020	South Carolina Gamecocks	32	(4)

Senior career*
Years	Team	Apps	(Gls)
2017	Arsenal	8	(0)
2021–2023	Arsenal	11	(1)
2022–2023	→ Aston Villa (loan)	26	(0)
2023–	Aston Villa	73	(4)

International career^{‡}
2014	England U15		
2015–2017	England U17	14	(3)
2017	England U19	6	(0)
2017–2018	England U20	8	(1)
2019	England U21	7	(0)
2024–	Republic of Ireland	27	(3)
- * Club domestic league appearances and goals as of 22 November 2026 ‡ National team caps and goals as of 18 October 2026

Anna Rose Patten (born 20 April 1999) is a professional footballer who plays as a defender for Women's Super League club Aston Villa. Born in England, she plays for the Republic of Ireland national team.

Patten previously played college soccer for the Florida State Seminoles and the South Carolina Gamecocks in the United States, and represented England at multiple youth levels from under-15 up to under-21.

== Early life ==
Patten grew up in Harpenden, England, a commuter town outside London. A childhood Arsenal fan, Patten joined the Arsenal Academy at 12 years of age. With the youth sides she won the FA Youth Cup, in 2015 and 2016. After years of development in the academy ranks, Patten made her senior side debut in 2017 aged 18.

== College career ==
=== Florida State Seminoles ===
In her freshman year at Florida State, Patten made 18 appearances, including 13 starts. Utilized primarily as a defender and holding midfielder, she tallied two assists during the season.

In her sophomore season she made 12 starts and played in 23 matches. She scored four goals and made two assists. Patten and the Seminoles won the 2018 ACC Women's Championship & the 2018 NCAA Division I Women's Soccer Tournament.

=== South Carolina Gamecocks ===
Patten transferred to the South Carolina Gamecocks as a rising junior. She joined England U21 teammate Grace Fisk at the university who helped with the transfer process. The pair helped the Gamecocks post 15 shutouts in their first 21 matches of the 2019 season. They helped South Carolina to a 2019 SEC-Soccer Championship. Patten was named the All-SEC second team and made the SEC Academic Honour Roll.

The Southeastern Conference was one of the conferences which opted to play their 2020 NCAA women's soccer tournament in the fall with a reduced 10-game season. Patten was named captain of the side for the fall campaign. She played the second-most minutes of anyone on the team and was named to the All-SEC First Team.

She graduated with a degree in sociology.

== Club career ==
=== Arsenal ===
Patten made her senior side debut in a Champion's league match against Bayern Munich in February 2017, having gone through Arsenal's academy. She made her league debut in April 2017, during the FA WSL Spring Series. She went on to play every game of that series. Patten then departed Arsenal to play college soccer in the United States. She returned to the club on 7 January 2021.

On 17 January 2021 Patten made her second Arsenal debut against Reading in the FA WSL in a game which would end 1–1, in which she played 45 minutes. On 28 February she came on for her second game this time against Aston Villa where she played the final ten minutes in a game which would end 4–0 to Arsenal. On 19 March Patten came on as a substitute again in the league this time against Manchester United for the final four minutes a game in which Arsenal would win 2–0. Her fourth appearance was also as a substitute this time against North London rivals Tottenham Hotspur in game which would finish 3–0 to Arsenal.

On 18 April 2021, Patten scored her first goal for Arsenal in a FA Cup match against Gillingham in a game that would finish 10–0 to Arsenal.

==== Aston Villa (loan) ====
It was announced on 4 January 2022 that Patten had joined Aston Villa on loan until the end of the 2021–22 season. She returned on loan for the full 2022–23 season.

=== Aston Villa ===
On 11 July 2023, Patten completed a permanent transfer to Aston Villa, signing a three-year contract after having made 33 appearances across all competitions during her time on loan at Aston Villa. On 16 July 2025, it was announced that she had signed a new contract to extend her time with the club through to June 2028.

== International career ==
=== England ===
Patten was part of several England youth teams. She made her first appearance on the U-15 team in 2014. Two years later Patten was part of the England 2016 FIFA U-17 Women's World Cup which reached the quarterfinals. In 2018 she was part of the England U20 which finished third at the 2018 FIFA U-20 Women's World Cup in France.

=== Republic of Ireland ===
In March 2024, Patten received her first senior call up to the Republic of Ireland squad for the UEFA Women's Euro 2025 qualifying matches against France and England. Patten is eligible to play for the Republic of Ireland through her Irish grandparents. She made her debut for the team during a 1–0 defeat against France on 5 April 2024. She scored her first goal for Ireland in a 3–1 victory against France on 16 July. Patten scored in Ireland's Euro 2025 play-off final 2–1 defeat to Wales on 3 December.

== Career statistics ==
=== Club ===
As of match played 22 November 2026

Appearances and goals by club, season and competition
Club	Season	League			National cup (Note: Includes Women's FA Cup)		League cup (Note: Includes FA Women's League Cup/WSL Players Cup)		Continental (Note: Includes UEFA Women's Champions League)		Total	
Club	Season	Division	Apps	Goals	Apps	Goals	Apps	Goals	Apps	Goals	Apps	Goals
Arsenal	2017	Women's Super League	8	0	0	0	0	0	—		8	0
Arsenal	2020–21	Women's Super League	7	0	0	0	0	0	—		7	0
Arsenal	2021–22	Women's Super League	4	0	0	0	0	0	7	1	11	1
Arsenal	2022–23	Women's Super League	0	0	0	0	0	0	0	0	0	0
Arsenal	Total		19	0	0	0	0	0	7	1	26	1
Aston Villa (loan)	2021–22	Women's Super League	7	0	1	0	0	0	—		8	0
Aston Villa (loan)	2022–23	Women's Super League	19	0	3	0	3	1	—		25	1
Aston Villa	2023–24	Women's Super League	22	1	1	0	4	0	—		27	1
Aston Villa	2024–25	Women's Super League	21	2	3	1	3	0	—		27	3
Aston Villa	2025–26	Women's Super League	19	1	1	0	3	1	—		24	0
Aston Villa	2026–27	Women's Super League	11	0	0	0	4	0	—		15	0
Aston Villa	Total		99	3	9	1	17	2	—		125	6
Career total			114	3	9	1	17	2	7	1	151	7

=== International ===
As of match played 13 October 2026

Appearances and goals by national team and year
National team	Year	Apps	Goals
Republic of Ireland	2024	10	2
Republic of Ireland	2025	9	1
Republic of Ireland	2026	8	0
Total		27	3

==== Youth ====
National team	Year	Apps	Goals
England u17	2015–2017	14	3
England u19	2017	6	0
England u20	2017–2018	8	1
England u21	2019	7	0
Total		35	4

Scores and results list Republic of Ireland's goal tally first, score column indicates score after each Patten goal.

List of international goals scored by Anna Patten
No.	Date	Venue	Opponent	Score	Result	Competition
1	16 July 2024	Páirc Uí Chaoimh, Cork, Ireland	France	3–1	3–1	UEFA Women's Euro 2025 qualification
2	3 December 2024	Aviva Stadium, Dublin, Ireland	Wales	1–2	1–2	UEFA Women's Euro 2025 qualification
3	8 April 2025	Tallaght Stadium, Dublin	Greece	2–0	2–1	2025 UEFA Women's Nations League

== Honours ==
Florida State Seminoles

- NCAA Division I Women's Soccer Championship: 2018

Arsenal

- Women's FA Cup runner-up: 2020/21
