= Maria Thorisdottir =

Norwegian footballer (born 1993)

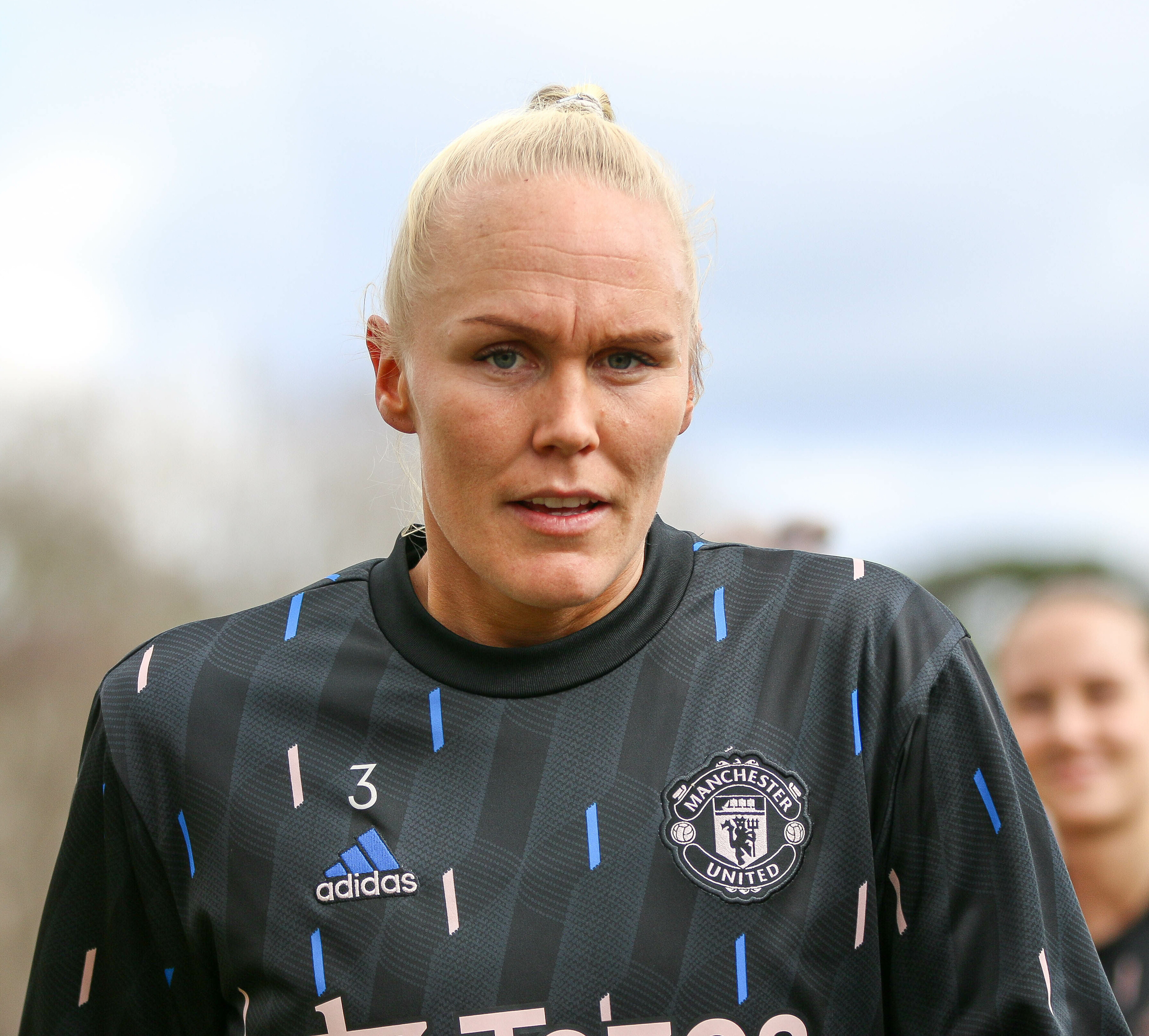
- Thorisdottir with Manchester United in 2023

Personal information
- Date of birth: 5 June 1993 (age 33)
- Place of birth: Stavanger, Norway
- Height: 1.70 m (5 ft 7 in)
- Position: Defender

Team information
- Current team: Klepp
- Number: 3

Youth career
- –2010: Klepp

Senior career*
Years	Team	Apps	(Gls)
2010–2017	Klepp	71	(8)
2012	Klepp II	1	(0)
2017–2021	Chelsea	22	(1)
2021–2023	Manchester United	31	(1)
2023–2025	Brighton & Hove Albion	33	(0)
2025	Marseille	0	(0)
2025	Brann	6	(0)
2026–	Klepp IL	0	(0)

International career^{‡}
2008	Norway U15	2	(0)
2008–2009	Norway U16	16	(6)
2009–2010	Norway U17	8	(0)
2010–2011	Norway U19	17	(1)
2012	Norway U20	5	(0)
2015	Norway U23	3	(0)
2015–	Norway	71	(3)
- * Club domestic league appearances and goals as of 8 September 2025 ‡ National team caps and goals as of 16 July 2024

Maria Thorisdottir (Icelandic: Maria Þórisdóttir, [ˈmaːrija ˈθouːrɪsˌtouhtɪr]; born 5 June 1993) is a Norwegian professional footballer who plays as a defender for Klepp and the Norway national team. Prior to fully focusing on football, she also played handball in the Eliteserien for Sola and Stabæk.

== Club career ==
=== Klepp ===
Thorisdottir began her career at Norwegian first division team Klepp IL. Originally a midfielder or striker within the Klepp youth system, she first transitioned to centre-back while with the youth national team. She made her senior debut as a 66th-minute substitute on 5 April 2010 in a 0–0 draw with Amazon Grimstad. She scored her first goal for the club on 29 August 2010, a 90th-minute consolation goal in a 3–1 defeat to Arna-Bjørnar.

In September 2012 Thorisdottir decided to retire from football due to injury, most notably citing her struggle with patellar tendinitis. During this spell she began playing handball, signing for Stabæk in June 2013.

In 2014, Thorisdottir made the decision to return to football and began training with Klepp again. Two years since her last appearance she made her comeback on 6 August 2014, starting in a 1–0 Norwegian Cup victory over Arna-Bjørnar. In August 2015 Thorisdottir was sidelined again, this time with a torn ankle ligament. Close to a return, Thorisdottir suffered a further setback when doctors picked up a rare and complicated issue with the foot that would be "potentially career-threatening" if left untreated. She underwent surgery in November 2015, keeping her out for the 2016 season.

A perpetual mid-table team during her tenure, Klepp earned their highest finish position in 12 seasons when Thorisdottir returned in 2017, ending the season in fourth-place in her final season with the club.

=== Chelsea ===
In September 2017, Thorisdottir left Klepp to sign a two-year contract with English FA WSL team Chelsea. She made her first appearance for the club on 24 September 2017 in a 6–0 WSL win over Bristol City. In her first season with the club Thorisdottir made 10 league appearances as Chelsea won the 2017–18 FA WSL title. She also made three appearances in the FA Cup including as a substitute in the final as Chelsea beat Arsenal 3–1.

In her second season at Chelsea, Thorisdottir scored her first goal for the club on 12 September 2018 in a UEFA Champions League Round of 32 5–0 victory over SFK 2000 Sarajevo. In October 2018, she suffered a concussion during a game which kept her out until May 2019. In June 2019, she renewed her contract with Chelsea until the summer of 2021.

=== Manchester United ===
On 22 January 2021, Thorisdottir signed for Manchester United from Chelsea on a two-and-a-half-year contract with an option to extend for a further year. Two weeks later, she made her debut in a 2–0 league defeat to Reading.

=== Brighton & Hove Albion ===
On 30 August 2023, Brighton & Hove Albion announced the signing of Thorisdottir.

On 5 May 2025, it was announced that Thorisdottir would be leaving Brighton when her contract expires in June 2025.

=== Marseille ===
On 18 August 2025, it was announced that Thorisdottir had signed for Marseille.

== International career ==
=== Youth ===
Thorisdottir went through all Norwegian junior teams beginning in 2008 at under-15 level. She was part of the under-17 team during 2009 UEFA Women's Under-17 Championship qualification and was called up to the finals in Nyon, Switzerland where Norway finished in fourth place. A year later, she was again part of the under-17s as Norway proceeded to the second round of 2010 UEFA Women's Under-17 Championship qualification before losing out to Germany.

At under-19 level Thorisdottir was part of the team at the 2011 UEFA Women's Under-19 Championship, reaching the tournament final before losing 8–1 to Germany. The tournament also acted as qualification for the 2012 FIFA U-20 Women's World Cup, only the second time Norway had qualified. Thorisdottir was part of the squad in Japan, making three appearances as Norway reached the quarter-finals before meeting Germany again and losing 4–0. Following the tournament, Thorisdottir announced her retirement from football due to injuries. Having reignited her club career with Klepp, she made a return to international football three years later, receiving a call-up to the under-23 team for the La Manga U23 invitational against Japan and the United States in February 2015.

=== Senior ===
On 16 February 2015, Thorisdottir was called-up to the senior team for the first time as part of the 2015 Algarve Cup squad. On 6 March 2015, just four days after appearing for the under-23 team in La Manga, Thorisdottir made her senior international debut starting in a 1–0 victory over Iceland. She had earlier been approached to play for Iceland but turned it down in the hope of making the Norwegian team. Despite this she described how special it was to debut against the country of her father's birth that she visited every summer to stay with her grandparents.

On 14 May 2015, she was named to the squad for the 2015 FIFA Women's World Cup. After sitting out the opening group game, she made her World Cup debut in a 1–1 draw with Germany. Norway progressed from the group stage before being eliminated by England in the Round of 16. Despite missing the entire qualification campaign with injuries, Thorisdottir was named in the squad for UEFA Women's Euro 2017. Having at least reached the semi-finals in the past four editions, Norway surprisingly crashed out bottom of the group having lost all three games, the first time they had failed to pick up any points at the tournament. Thorisdottir played the full 90 minutes in group games against both eventual finalist Denmark and Netherlands. In January 2018, she scored her first senior international goal in a 3–0 friendly win over Scotland. Having stayed fit enough to start all 8 of Norway's 2019 FIFA Women's World Cup qualification matches in which the team topped a group including the Netherlands, Thorisdottir was named to the final tournament squad in May 2019. She played every minute of all five of Norway's games in France before they were once again eliminated by England, this time at the quarter-final stage.

Thorisdottir was part of the squad that was called up to the UEFA Women's Euro 2022.

== Personal life ==
Thorisdottir was born in Norway to a Norwegian mother and an Icelandic father, Þórir Hergeirsson, appointed coach of the Norway women's national handball team in 2009. Her father's extended family lives in Iceland.

During her childhood, she was part of a juggling group and performed with different companies.

Thorisdottir got a Golden Retriever called Theo in 2015 and has regularly commented on the positive impact owning a dog has had on her mental health, especially during the two-year spell she had battling frequent injuries.

On 9th July 2026 Thorisdottir announced that her and her partner are expecting a baby girl due in 2027

== Career statistics ==
=== Club ===
As of 5 May 2025

Appearances and goals by club, season and competition
Club	Season	League			National cup (Note: Includes NM Kvinner and FA Cup)		League cup (Note: Includes FA Women's League Cup)		Continental (Note: Includes Champions League)		Total	
Club	Season	Division	Apps	Goals	Apps	Goals	Apps	Goals	Apps	Goals	Apps	Goals
Klepp	2010	Toppserien	17	1	0	0	—		—		17	1
Klepp	2011	Toppserien	14	4	1	0	—		—		15	4
Klepp	2012	Toppserien	7	1	0	0	—		—		7	1
Klepp	2013	Toppserien	0	0	0	0	—		—		0	0
Klepp	2014	Toppserien	5	0	1	0	—		—		6	0
Klepp	2015	Toppserien	14	1	2	1	—		—		16	2
Klepp	2016	Toppserien	0	0	0	0	—		—		0	0
Klepp	2017	Toppserien	14	1	3	0	—		—		17	1
Klepp	Total		71	8	7	1	—		—		78	9
Chelsea	2017–18	FA WSL	10	0	3	0	4	0	7	0	24	0
Chelsea	2018–19	FA WSL	5	0	0	0	3	0	2	1	10	1
Chelsea	2019–20	FA WSL	5	1	0	0	3	0	—		8	1
Chelsea	2020–21	FA WSL	2	0	0	0	2	0	1	0	5	0
Chelsea	Total		22	1	3	0	12	0	10	1	47	2
Manchester United	2020–21	WSL	6	0	2	0	0	0	—		8	0
Manchester United	2021–22	WSL	20	1	2	0	5	0	—		27	1
Manchester United	2022–23	WSL	5	0	1	0	4	0	—		10	0
Manchester United	Total		31	1	5	0	9	0	—		45	1
Brighton & Hove Albion	2023–24	WSL	20	0	2	0	4	0	—		26	0
Brighton & Hove Albion	2024–25	WSL	13	0	2	0	1	0	—		16	0
Brighton & Hove Albion	Total		33	0	4	0	5	0	—		42	0
Career total			157	10	19	1	26	0	10	1	212	12

=== International ===
As of match played 16 July 2024

Appearances and goals by national team and year
National team	Year	Apps	Goals
Norway	2015	8	0
Norway	2016	0	0
Norway	2017	12	0
Norway	2018	11	1
Norway	2019	10	1
Norway	2020	5	0
Norway	2021	8	1
Norway	2022	10	0
Norway	2023	3	0
Norway	2024	4	0
Total		71	3

Scores and results list Norway's goal tally first, score column indicates score after each Thorisdottir goal.

List of international goals scored by Maria Thorisdottir
No.	Date	Venue	Opponent	Score	Result	Competition
1	19 January 2018	La Manga Stadium, La Manga, Spain	Scotland	3–0	3–0	Friendly
2	4 October 2019	Borisov Arena, Barysaw, Belarus	Belarus	3–1	7–1	Euro 2022 qualifying
3	25 November 2021	Arena Kombëtare, Tirana, Albania	Albania	3–0	7–0	2023 World Cup qualification

== Honours ==
Chelsea

- FA Women's Super League: 2017–18, 2019–20
- Women's FA Cup: 2018
- FA Women's League Cup: 2020
- Women's FA Community Shield: 2020

Manchester United

- Women's FA Cup runner-up: 2023
