= Bicho (footballer, born 2003) =

Spanish footballer

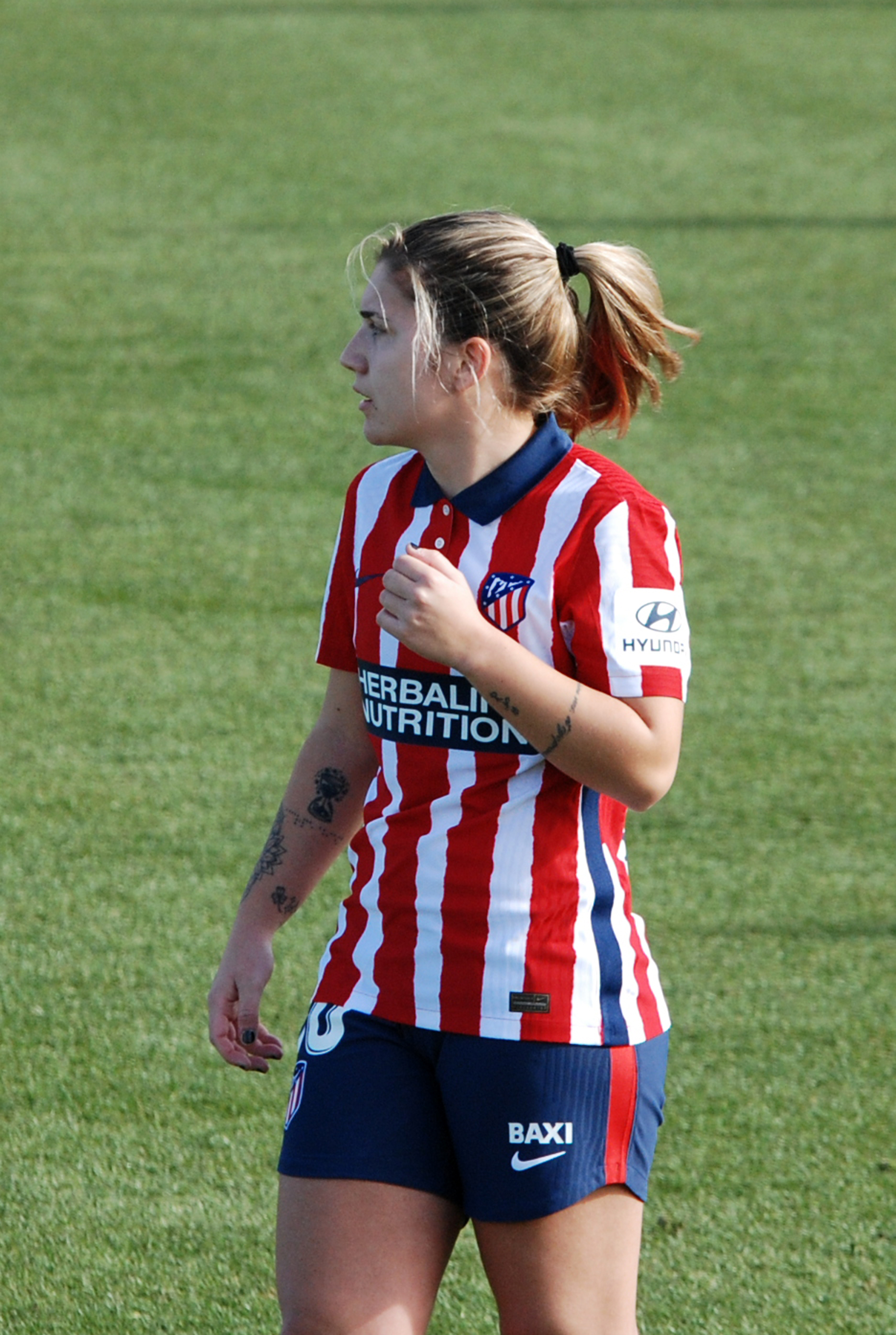

Personal information
- Full name: Claudia Iglesias de la Cruz
- Date of birth: 30 August 2003 (age 23)
- Place of birth: Madrid, Spain,
- Height: 1.64 m (5 ft 5 in)
- Position: Midfielder

Youth career
- 2017–2018: Atlético Madrid

Senior career*
Years	Team	Apps	(Gls)
2018–2019	Atlético Madrid C		
2019–2021	Atlético Madrid B	47	(8)
2020–2022	Atlético Madrid	24	(0)
2022–2024	Villarreal	48	(6)
2024–2026	UD Tenerife	37	(3)
- * Club domestic league appearances and goals as of 1 July 2026

Claudia Iglesias de la Cruz (born 30 August 2003), most commonly known as Bicho, is a Spanish footballer who plays as a midfielder.

== Club career ==
Bicho started her career at Atlético Madrid's academy.
