= Carrie Jones (footballer) =

Welsh footballer (born 2003)

Personal information
- Date of birth: 4 September 2003 (age 23)
- Place of birth: Newtown, Wales
- Height: 1.65 m (5 ft 5 in)
- Position: Midfielder

Team information
- Current team: IFK Norrköping

Youth career
- Newtown White Stars
- Berriew Juniors

Senior career*
Years	Team	Apps	(Gls)
2019–2020	Cardiff City Ladies	9	(3)
2020–2023	Manchester United	5	(0)
2022–2023	→ Leicester City (loan)	19	(2)
2023–2024	Bristol City	18	(3)
2024–	IFK Norrköping	15	(0)

International career^{‡}
- Wales U15
2018–19	Wales U17	6	(0)
2019–	Wales	52	(4)
- * Club domestic league appearances and goals as of 28 May 2025 ‡ National team caps and goals as of 18 October 2026

Carrie Jones (born 4 September 2003) is a Welsh footballer who plays as a midfielder for Swedish Damallsvenskan club IFK Norrköping and the Wales national team. She made her international debut for Wales at the age of 15 in 2019.

== Early life ==
Jones was born on 4 September 2003 in Wales to Andrew and Joyce Jones. She grew up in Newtown, Powys and has an older sister, Maia, and a younger brother, Ioan. She attended Newtown High School.

Jones began playing football as a child at her grandmother's farm in Powys with her cousins and spent the majority of her youth career playing in local boys' teams. She joined her first youth side, Newtown White Stars, at the age of seven. She was forced to leave the club after a rule was introduced prohibiting girls from playing in a boys' team until they were 12 years old. This rule was eventually rescinded and Jones resumed playing in boys' sides. She later played for Berriew Junior Boys.

== Club career ==
=== Cardiff City Ladies ===
Jones joined FA Women's National League South team Cardiff City Ladies for the 2019–20 season. She made nine league appearances for the team, scoring three goals.

=== Manchester United ===
In June 2020, it was announced Jones would be moving to Manchester United to join the club's full-time U21 FA WSL Academy team. Having been included in the two previous senior matchday squads as an unused substitute, she made her first-team debut on 7 March 2021 as an 88th-minute substitute for Jessica Sigsworth in a 3–0 Women's Super League win over Aston Villa.

On 19 November 2021, it was announced that Jones had signed her first professional contract with Manchester United until 2023 with the option of a further year.

==== Leicester City (loan) ====
On 21 July 2022, Jones joined fellow WSL side Leicester City on loan for the 2022–23 season.

=== Bristol City ===
On 6 September 2023, Jones had signed a three-year contract with newly promoted WSL side Bristol City. She scored the opening goal in Citys' 4-2 opening day defeat against Leicester.

=== IFK Norrköping ===
On 30 August 2024, Bristol City announced that Swedish Damallsvenskan club IFK Norrköping had paid Jones' buy-out clause. She signed a three-year contract with the club.

== International career ==
Having previously captained Wales at under-16 and under-17 levels, On 29 August 2019, Jones made her debut for the senior Wales national team as an 83rd minute substitute in place of Emma Jones during a 6–0 victory against Faroe Islands in the UEFA Women's Euro 2021 qualifying at the age of 15 years and 359 days. At under 16 years of age, she was noted for making her senior international debut before she was eligible to play in a senior competitive match for her club. Jones had been called up to the senior squad the previous year as an experience building exercise but was ineligible to be selected due to her age. She made her first start on her second appearance, playing 77 minutes in a 1–0 friendly defeat to Scotland on 15 June 2021.

On 3 December 2024, Jones was introduced from the bench during Wales' UEFA Women's Euro 2025 qualification play-off match against the Republic of Ireland and scored the winning goal in a 2–1 victory, securing Wales qualification for their first ever major international tournament. In June 2025, she was named in Wales' squad for UEFA Women's Euro 2025 with 37 caps for Cymru.

== Style of play ==
Following Jones' international debut, former Wales player Gwennan Harries described Jones as "So composed, got two great feet, but most importantly for me, her work ethic is outstanding, a real team player."

== Career statistics ==
=== Club ===
As of match played 28 January 2024

Appearances and goals by club, season and competition
Club	Season	League			FA Cup		League Cup		Total	
Club	Season	Division	Apps	Goals	Apps	Goals	Apps	Goals	Apps	Goals
Cardiff City Ladies	2019–20	WNL South	9	3	1	0	0	0	10	3
Manchester United	2020–21	Women's Super League	2	0	2	0	0	0	4	0
Manchester United	2021–22	Women's Super League	3	0	1	0	2	0	6	0
Manchester United	Total		5	0	3	0	2	0	10	0
Leicester City (loan)	2022–23	Women's Super League	19	2	1	0	2	0	22	2
Bristol City	2023–24	Women's Super League	18	3	1	0	4	0	23	3
IFK Norrköping	2024	Damallsvenskan	8	0	0	0	0	0	8	0
IFK Norrköping	2025	Damallsvenskan	7	0	0	0	0	0	7	0
IFK Norrköping	Total		15	0	0	0	0	0	15	0
Career total			66	8	6	0	8	0	74	7

=== International appearances ===
As of matches played 28 October 2025. Statistics from the Football Association of Wales

Appearances and goals by national team and year
National team	Year	Apps	Goals
Wales	2019	1	0
Wales	2020	0	0
Wales	2021	6	0
Wales	2022	12	2
Wales	2023	4	0
Wales	2024	8	1
Wales	2025	11	1
Total		42	4

Scores and results list Wales's goal tally first, score column indicates score after each Jones goal.

List of international goals scored by Carrie Jones
No.	Date	Venue	Opponent	Score	Result	Competition	Ref.
1	2 September 2022	Panthessaliko Stadium, Volos, Greece	Greece	1–0	1–0	2023 FIFA World Cup qualification	
2	12 November 2022	Pinatar Arena, San Pedro del Pinatar, Spain	Finland	1–0	1–1	Friendly	
3	3 December 2024	Aviva Stadium, Dublin, Ireland	Republic of Ireland	2–0	2–1	UEFA Women's Euro 2025 qualifying play-offs	
4	28 October 2025	Rodney Parade, Newport, Wales	Poland	2–3	2–5	Friendly	
