= Millie Turner =

English footballer (born 1996)

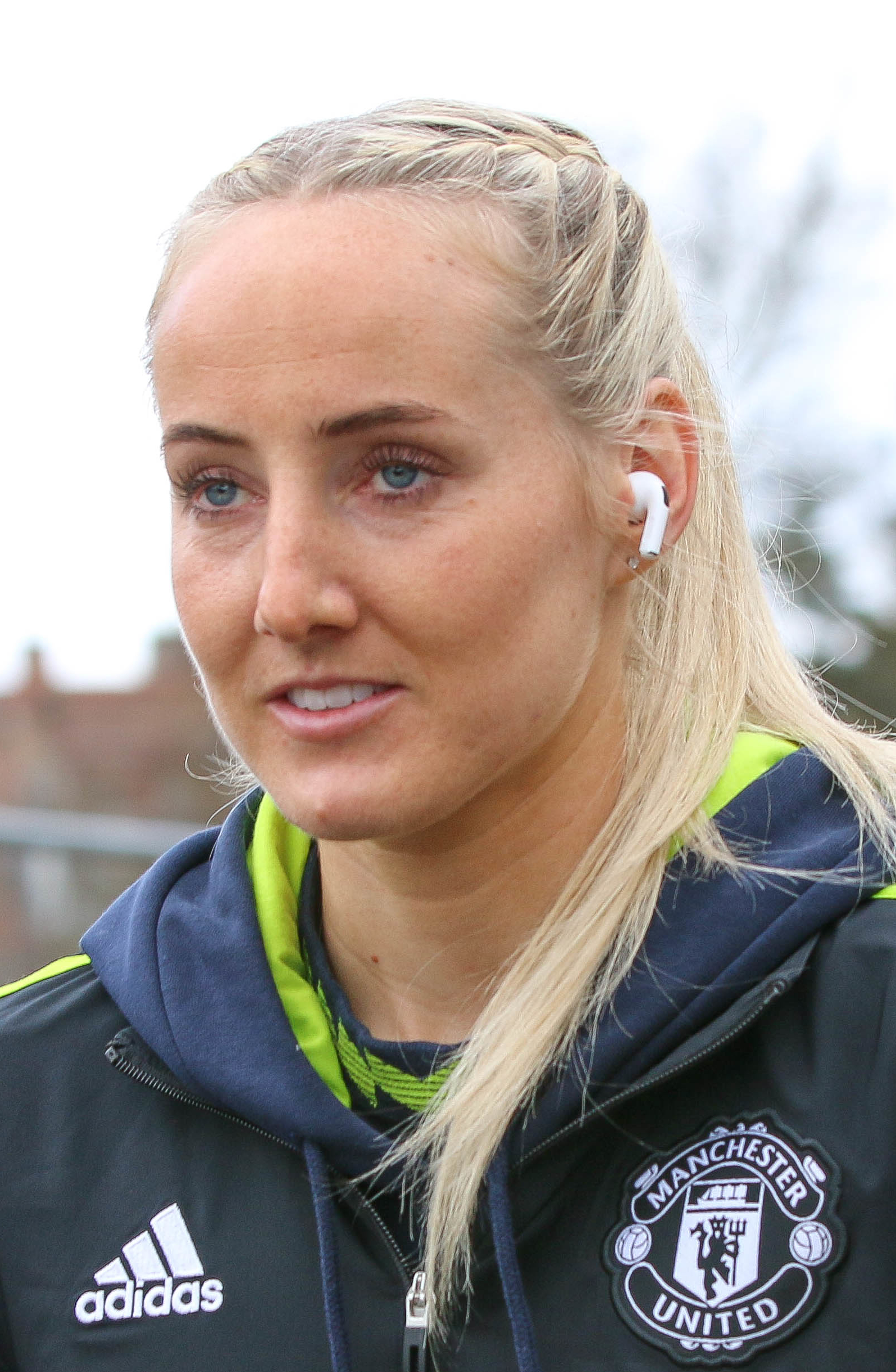
- Turner playing for Manchester United in 2023

Personal information
- Date of birth: 7 July 1996 (age 30)
- Place of birth: Wilmslow, England
- Height: 5 ft 10 in (1.78 m)
- Position: Centre-back

Team information
- Current team: Birmingham City

Youth career
- 2011–2013: Manchester United
- 2013–2014: Everton

Senior career*
Years	Team	Apps	(Gls)
2014–2017	Everton	32	(3)
2017–2018	Bristol City	26	(1)
2018–2026	Manchester United	133	(9)
2026–	Birmingham City	4	(0)

International career^{‡}
2013–2015	England U19	10	(1)
2018	England U23	1	(0)
2024–	England	2	(0)
- * Club domestic league appearances and goals as of 4 October 2026 ‡ National team caps and goals as of 3 December 2024

Millie Turner (born 7 July 1996) is an English footballer who plays as a centre-back for Women's Super League club Birmingham City, which she captains, and the England national team. A product of the Manchester United academy, she previously played for Everton and Bristol City before returning to United in 2018, and represented England at under-19 and under-23 youth level before making her senior debut in 2024.

== Club career ==
=== Early career ===
Turner grew up in Wilmslow with twin brother Bruce and younger brother Jake, now a professional goalkeeper with Newport County. At the age of 10 she began playing with Stockport County before moving to Manchester City and then Crewe Alexandra's highly regarded youth setup. When Crewe's Centre of Excellence folded she drew offers from both Merseyside giants Liverpool and Everton but turned them down in favour of Manchester United.

=== Everton ===
Turner joined Everton midway through the 2013 season and linked up with the development squad. She signed her first senior contract ahead of the 2014 season and made her league debut in a 2–0 defeat to Notts County on 20 April. She made a further five league appearances in her inaugural season, as well as two appearances in the FA WSL Cup.

On 1 June, Turner featured in the Women's FA Cup Final as Everton lost 2–0 to Arsenal at Stadium MK.

=== Bristol City ===
In January 2017, Turner joined Bristol City ahead of the FA WSL Spring Series. She made her debut in a 3–1 defeat to Reading on 22 April and went on to play in a further seven games that season.

Turner was named captain ahead of the 2017–18 FA WSL campaign and scored her first goal for the club in a 2–1 loss to Chelsea in the FA WSL Cup on 4 November. She scored her first league goal in a 6–1 defeat to Manchester City on 3 May 2018.

=== Manchester United ===
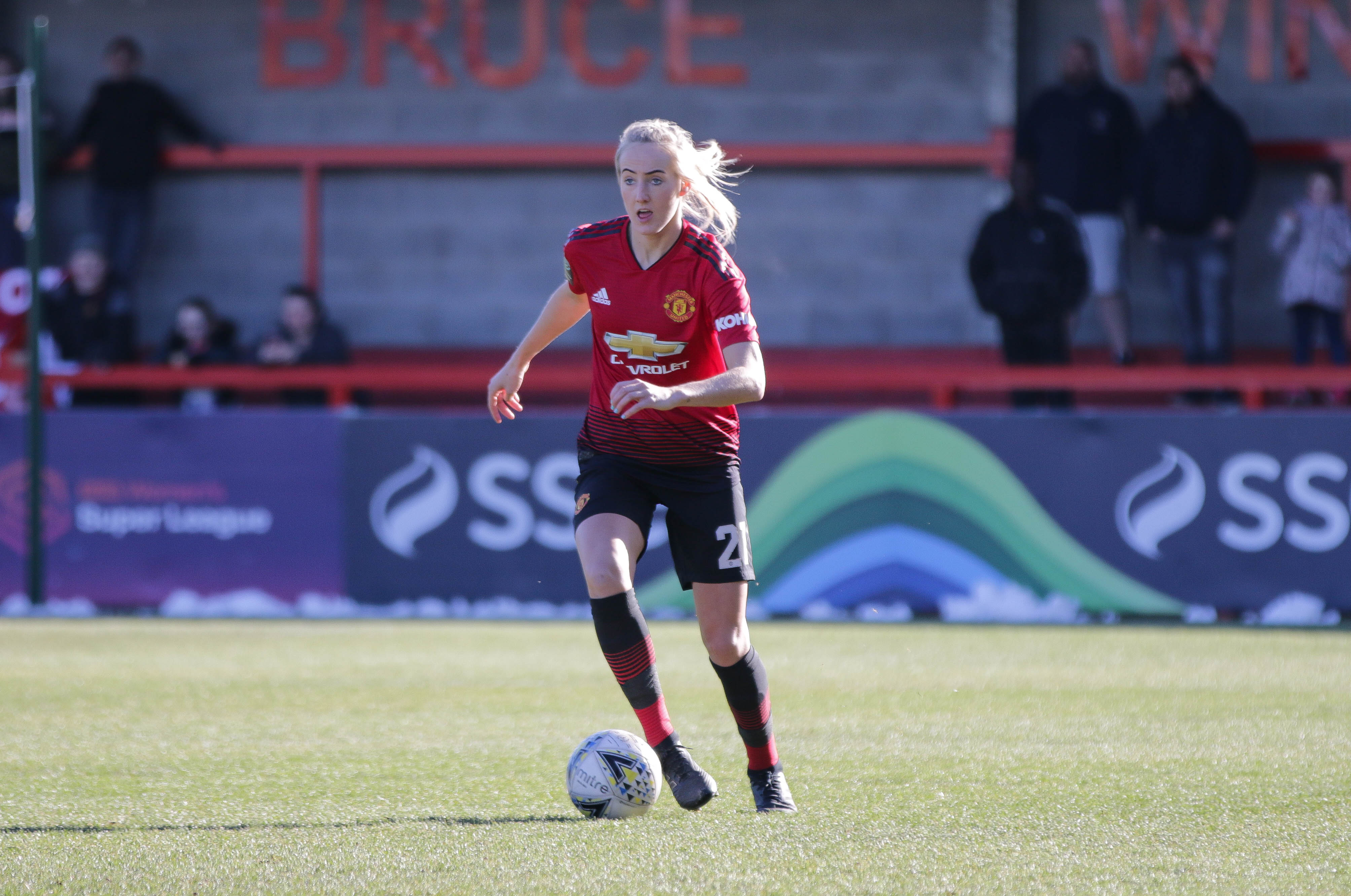
Turner playing for Manchester United in 2019

On 1 July 2018, Turner joined the newly-formed Manchester United to compete in the FA Women's Championship, reuniting with manager Willie Kirk who had been appointed assistant manager at United. She was one of seven players to return to the senior side having played for the club at youth level. She made her debut for the club in a 1–0 FA WSL Cup win over Liverpool on 19 August, and her league debut three weeks later in a 12–0 victory at Aston Villa. On 23 September, Turner scored her first goal for the club during a 5–0 win against London Bees.

Turner missed the second half of the 2021–22 season after being diagnosed with a carotid artery dissection, forcing her to stop all physical activity. She was able to resume training ahead of the 2022–23 season and made her first appearance since her diagnosis starting in United's opening day WSL victory over Reading.

Turner departed United as the club's second all-time appearance holder behind Ella Toone, having made 189 appearances for the club.

=== Birmingham City ===
On 15 July 2026, it was announced that Turner had signed for Birmingham City. She was named as the team's new captain on 28 August 2026.

== International career ==
=== Youth ===
In February 2014, Turner was named in the England under-19 for the 2014 La Manga Tournament in March. In July 2015, she was named in the England under-19 squad for the UEFA Women's Under-19 Championship in Israel. England finished bottom of group B and did not progress.

=== Senior ===
In September 2020, Turner received her first senior national team call-up as part of a 30-player training camp at St George's Park. In February 2021, she received her fourth senior call up to the Lioness squad, replacing injured Chelsea defender Millie Bright.

After an almost three-year absence, Turner was recalled to the England squad in November 2023 for a pair of Nations League matches against the Netherlands and Scotland, again replacing Bright due to injury, where she was an unused substitute in both matches. In February 2024, she was called up to the squad for friendly fixtures against Austria and Italy, to replace an injured Leah Williamson. She made her senior international debut on 27 February, as an 80th-minute substitute in a 5–1 win against Italy. Turner has been awarded the Legacy number 229 by The Football Association.

== Personal life ==
Her younger brother Jake Turner is also a footballer. Turner was previously in a relationship with fellow women's footballer Rachel Daly.

On 24 June 2026, she announced her engagement to Manchester United and Birmingham City teammate Lisa Naalsund.

== Career statistics ==
=== Club ===
As of match played 4 October 2026

Appearances and goals by club, season and competition
Club	Season	League			FA Cup (Note: Includes the Women's FA Cup)		League Cup (Note: Includes the WSL Cup/Women's League Cup)		Europe (Note: Includes the UEFA Women's Champions League)		Total	
Club	Season	Division	Apps	Goals	Apps	Goals	Apps	Goals	Apps	Goals	Apps	Goals
Everton	2014	WSL 1	6	0	3	0	2	0	—		11	0
Everton	2015	WSL 2	10	2	2	0	4	0	—		16	2
Everton	2016	WSL 2	16	1	3	0	0	0	—		19	1
Everton	Total		32	3	8	0	6	0	0	0	46	3
Bristol City	2017	WSL 1	8	0	0	0	0	0	—		8	0
Bristol City	2017–18	WSL 1	18	1	0	0	5	1	—		23	2
Bristol City	Total		26	1	0	0	5	1	0	0	31	2
Manchester United	2018–19	Championship	20	2	3	0	6	0	—		29	2
Manchester United	2019–20	WSL	14	0	1	0	5	0	—		20	0
Manchester United	2020–21	WSL	22	2	2	1	3	0	—		27	3
Manchester United	2021–22	WSL	4	0	0	0	3	0	—		7	0
Manchester United	2022–23	WSL	22	2	5	0	3	0	—		30	2
Manchester United	2023–24	WSL	22	2	5	1	2	0	2	0	31	3
Manchester United	2024–25	WSL	21	0	5	0	4	1	—		30	1
Manchester United	2025–26	WSL	8	1	2	0	0	0	5	0	15	1
Manchester United	Total		133	9	23	2	26	1	7	0	189	12
Birmingham City	2026–27	Women's Super League	4	0	0	0	1	0	—		5	0
Career total			195	13	31	2	38	2	7	0	271	17

=== International ===
As of match played 3 December 2024

Appearances and goals by national team and year
National team	Year	Apps	Goals
England	2024	2	0
Total		2	0

== Honours ==
Manchester United

- FA Women's Championship: 2018–19
- Women's FA Cup: 2023–24; runner-up: 2022–23, 2024–25
- Women's League Cup runner-up: 2025–26
