= Aoife Mannion =

Irish footballer (born 1995)

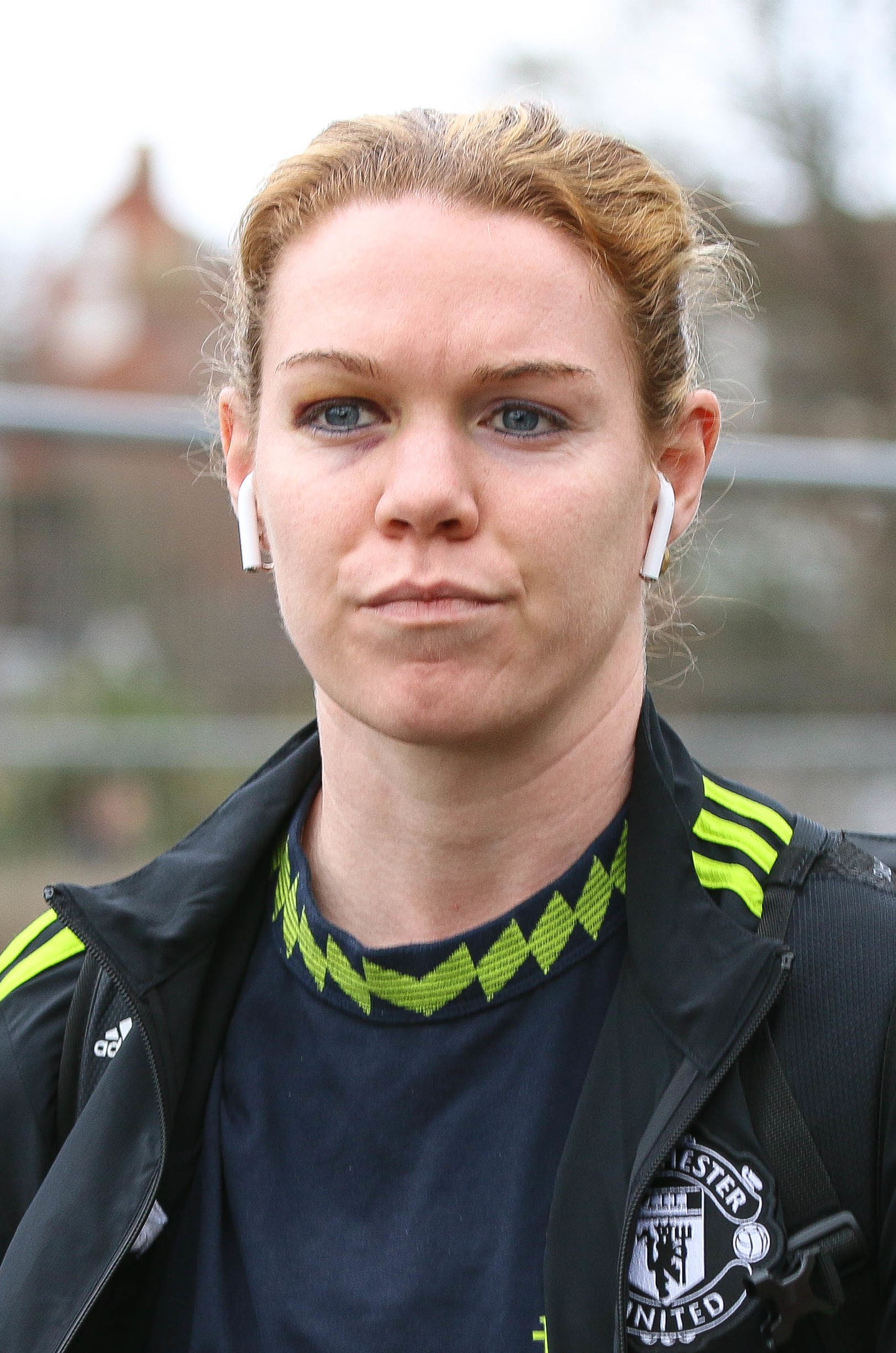
- Mannion representing Manchester United in 2023

Personal information
- Date of birth: 24 September 1995 (age 31)
- Place of birth: Solihull, England
- Height: 1.68 m (5 ft 6 in)
- Position: Centre back

Team information
- Current team: Newcastle United
- Number: 25

Youth career
- Birmingham City
- Aston Villa

Senior career*
Years	Team	Apps	(Gls)
2012–2013	Aston Villa	13	(0)
2013–2019	Birmingham City	93	(8)
2019–2021	Manchester City	7	(0)
2021–2025	Manchester United	34	(0)
2025–	Newcastle United	22	(0)

International career^{‡}
2010	England U15	2	(0)
2010–2012	England U17	15	(0)
2012–2014	England U19	21	(0)
2014	England U20	3	(0)
2015–2016	England U23	10	(0)
2023–	Republic of Ireland	27	(1)
Medal record
Representing England
UEFA Women's Under-19 Championship
Runner-up	2013 Wales
- * Club domestic league appearances and goals as of 4 May 2026 ‡ National team caps and goals as of 18 October 2026

Aoife Mannion (/ˈiːfə/; born 24 September 1995) is an Irish professional footballer who plays as a centre-back for Women's Super League 2 club Newcastle United and the Republic of Ireland women's national team. She was previously capped for England, the country of her birth, at youth level and received her first senior call-up in August 2019 but never appeared before debuting for Ireland in February 2023. Mannion began her senior club career at Aston Villa before appearing for Birmingham City, Manchester City and Manchester United. She has been named to the PFA WSL Team of the Year twice.

== Early years ==
Mannion was born in Solihull and attended St Peter's Catholic School, where she was a classmate of fellow footballer Jack Grealish. Mannion attended Solihull School sixth form college from 2012 to 2014. Mannion began playing football at the age of six for Celtic Reds under the management of Mark Fogarty, captaining the side to a Warwickshire County League title. In 2006, she left Celtic Reds under-10s to join the Birmingham City Centre of Excellence. Her father would also take her to St Andrew's to watch the Birmingham City men's team play, citing Robbie Savage and Roy Keane as childhood inspirations. Mannion also played Gaelic football growing up.

== Club career ==
=== Aston Villa ===
Having joined the Aston Villa Centre of Excellence, Mannion was promoted to the first team in July 2012 by Joe Hunt, who had managed her in the academy. The team played in the second-tier FA Women's Premier League National Division. Mannion made 21 appearances in all competitions as Aston Villa won the 2012–13 FA Women's Premier League Cup, beating Leeds United on penalties in the final.

=== Birmingham City ===
Mannion was signed for Birmingham City in August 2013 by David Parker. She made her Birmingham debut on 16 October 2013 against Finnish side PK-35 Vantaa in the first leg of the 2013–14 UEFA Women's Champions League round of 32. Birmingham defeated PK-35 Vantaa 1–0 and advanced to the round of 16. Forging a partnership with Kerys Harrop, Mannion played every minute of the 2014 and 2015 FA WSL seasons, with her performances leading her to be named to the 2015 PFA Women's Young Player of the Year shortlist, but lost out to Leah Williamson. She signed a new contract ahead of the 2016 season. In 2016, Mannion continued her ever-present run, starting all but the final game of the season, ending a run of 44 successive WSL starts. In 2017, Birmingham reached the FA Cup final for the second time in their history. Held at Wembley Stadium, Mannion started the 2017 FA Women's Cup Final as Birmingham lost 4–1 to Manchester City. Under Marc Skinner, Mannion was selected in back to back PFA Team of the Years for 2017–18 and 2018–19, before departing the club when her contract expired on 30 June 2019, declining a new deal to stay at Birmingham.

=== Manchester City ===
On 9 July 2019, Manchester City announced the signing of Mannion on a two-year deal ahead of the 2019–20 season. She made her competitive debut for City on 7 September 2019, starting in the season opener as City beat Manchester United 1–0 in the first professional women's Manchester derby in front of a then-record 31,213 crowd. She scored her first goal for the club on 12 September 2019, a penalty in a 7–1 Champions League round of 32 first leg victory against Swiss side Lugano. Mannion injured her anterior cruciate ligament in a Champions League game against Atlético Madrid on 19 October 2019. The injury kept her out for 16 months, finally making a return to play as a 72nd-minute substitute in a 4–0 win over her former side Birmingham City on 28 February 2021, 498 days since her last appearance. She made her first start since the injury against Tottenham Hotspur on 4 April 2021, stepping in for the withdrawing Alex Greenwood having originally been named as a substitute. She played the full 90 minutes as City won 3–0. Mannion left Manchester City at the end of the 2020–21 season upon the expiration of her contract having made 11 appearances in all competitions.

=== Manchester United ===
On 26 July 2021, Mannion signed a two-year contract with Manchester United. On 2 February 2022, Mannion suffered a second ACL injury. After 11 months out, she made her first appearance following her recovery in a midseason friendly against Birkirkara in Malta in January 2023. On 19 July 2023, Mannion signed an undisclosed contract extension with the club.

On 19 June 2025, it was announced that Mannion was to leave the club at the end of her contract on 30 June.

=== Newcastle United ===
Mannion signed for Women's Super League 2 club Newcastle United on 18 July 2025.

== International career ==
Mannion is eligible to represent both England, as the country of her birth, and Ireland, where both her parents are from.

=== England ===
Mannion represented England at under-15, under-17, under-19, under-20 and under-23 level. She played during 2011 and 2012 UEFA Women's Under-17 Championship qualification as England reached the second round both times but failed to make the finals.

Mannion was called up to represent England at the 2012 and 2013 UEFA Women's Under-19 Championship. She played every minute as England reached the final of the latter before losing to France. Despite the loss, the result qualified the team for the 2014 FIFA U-20 Women's World Cup in Canada. Mannion again played every minute as draws against South Korea and Mexico before defeat against Nigeria saw the team finish third in the group and eliminated.

In May 2015, Mannion was named to the under-23 team for the Nordic Tournament. In March 2016, she played for the under-23 team at the La Manga tournament.

In August 2019, Mannion received her first senior England call-up for friendlies against Belgium and Norway but did not make an appearance. She was recalled to the squad for the following set of fixtures against Portugal and Brazil but was again an unused substitute in both games.

=== Republic of Ireland ===
In February 2023, Mannion was named to the Republic of Ireland squad by Vera Pauw for a friendly against China having opted to switch her international eligibility. She made her senior international debut on 22 February, starting and playing 70 minutes of a 0–0 draw with China. She was not named in Ireland's 2023 FIFA Women's World Cup squad due to injury. Mannion scored her first goal for Ireland during a 6–0 UEFA Women's Euro 2025 qualification play-off victory against Georgia on 25 October 2024.

== Career statistics ==
=== Club ===
As of 4 May 2026

Appearances and goals by club, season and competition
Club	Season	League			FA Cup		League Cup		Continental (Note: Includes the UEFA Women's Champions League)		Total	
Club	Season	Division	Apps	Goals	Apps	Goals	Apps	Goals	Apps	Goals	Apps	Goals
Aston Villa	2012–13	WPL National	13	0	3	0	5	0	—		21	0
Birmingham City	2013	FA WSL 1	4	0	0	0	0	0	2	0	6	0
Birmingham City	2014	FA WSL 1	14	1	2	0	3	0	4	0	23	1
Birmingham City	2015	FA WSL 1	14	1	2	0	7	0	—		23	1
Birmingham City	2016	FA WSL 1	15	1	1	0	4	0	—		20	1
Birmingham City	2017	FA WSL 1	8	0	0	0	—		—		8	0
Birmingham City	2017–18	FA WSL 1	18	3	2	0	4	0	—		24	3
Birmingham City	2018–19	FA WSL 1	20	2	0	0	6	1	—		26	3
Birmingham City	Total		93	8	7	0	24	1	6	0	130	9
Manchester City	2019–20	FA WSL	4	0	0	0	0	0	3	1	7	1
Manchester City	2020–21	FA WSL	3	0	0	0	0	0	1	0	4	0
Manchester City	Total		7	0	0	0	0	0	4	1	11	1
Manchester United	2021–22	WSL	12	0	1	0	6	0	—		19	0
Manchester United	2022–23	WSL	5	0	4	0	0	0	—		9	0
Manchester United	2023–24	WSL	4	0	3	0	0	0	0	0	7	0
Manchester United	2024–25	WSL	13	0	5	1	2	0	—		20	1
Manchester United	Total		34	0	13	1	8	0	0	0	55	1
Newcastle United	2025-26	WSL2	22	0	1	0	3	0	—		26	0
Newcastle United	Total		22	0	1	0	3	0	—		26	0
Career total			169	8	24	1	40	1	10	1	243	11

=== International ===
As of 13 October 2026

Year	Republic of Ireland	
Year	Apps	Goals
2023	2	0
2024	9	1
2025	8	0
2026	8	0
Total	27	1

Scores and results list Republic of Ireland's goal tally first, score column indicates score after each Mannion goal.

List of international goals scored by Aoife Mannion
No.	Date	Cap	Venue	Opponent	Score	Result	Competition
1	25 October 2024	10	Mikheil Meskhi Stadium, Tbilisi, Georgia	Georgia	6–0	6–0	UEFA Women's Euro 2025 qualification play-offs

== Honours ==
Aston Villa

- FA Women's National League Cup winner: 2012–13

Birmingham City

- FA Women's League Cup runner-up: 2016
- Women's FA Cup runner-up: 2016–17

Manchester City

- FA Women's Super League runner-up: 2019–20, 2020–21

Manchester United

- Women's FA Cup: 2023–24; runner-up: 2022–23, 2024–25

England

- UEFA Women's Under-19 Championship runner-up: 2013

Individual

- FA WSL Team of the Year: 2017–18, 2018–19
- PFA Community Champion Award: 2022–23
