= 2023–24 Manchester United W.F.C. season =

Manchester United Women
2023–24 season
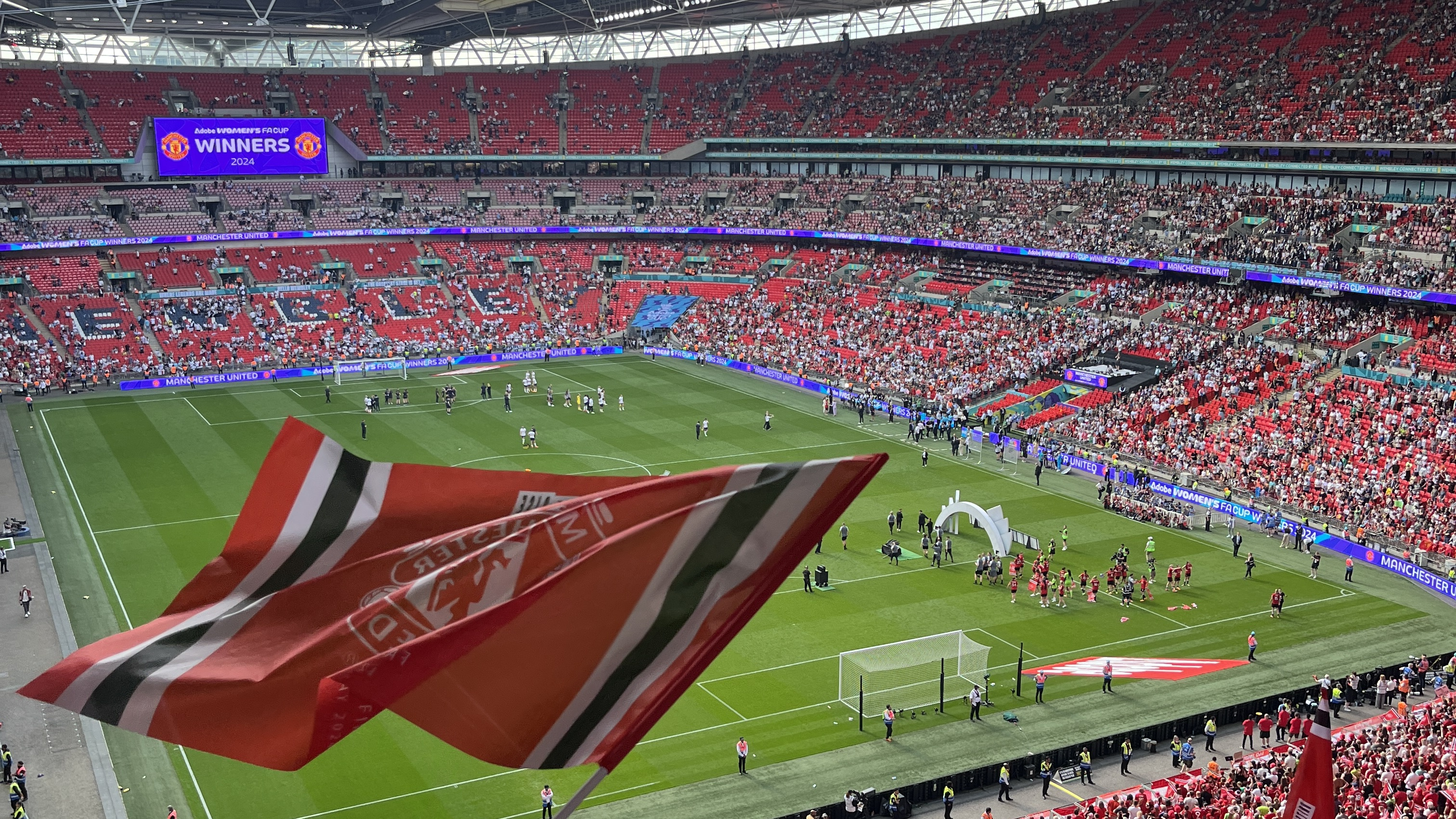
- Co-chairmen: Joel and Avram Glazer
- Head coach: Marc Skinner
- Stadium: Leigh Sports Village
- Women's Super League: 5th
- FA Cup: Winners
- League Cup: Group stage
- Champions League: Second qualifying round
- Top goalscorer: League: Nikita Parris (8 goals); All: Nikita Parris (16 goals)
- Highest home attendance: 43,615 (v. Manchester City, 19 November 2023)
- Lowest home attendance: League: 4,060 (v. Brighton & Hove Albion, 4 February 2024); All: 1,804 (v. Everton, 9 November 2023, League Cup)
- Average home league attendance: 10,957
Home colours	Away colours	Third colours

The 2023–24 season was Manchester United Women's sixth season since they were founded and their fifth in the Women's Super League, the professional top-flight women's league in England. The club also competed in the FA Cup, League Cup and, for the first time in their history, the UEFA Women's Champions League.

The season saw Manchester United Women win their first major trophy, beating Tottenham Hotspur 4–0 at Wembley Stadium in the 2024 Women's FA Cup final on 12 May 2024. It was the team's second major cup final, reaching the Women's FA Cup final for the second consecutive year after finishing as runners-up to Chelsea the previous season. It was the first time since Birmingham City in 2012 that the FA Cup had not been won by Arsenal, Chelsea or Manchester City and the first time since 2005 that none of those teams contested the final.

For the fourth consecutive season, Manchester United Women played at Old Trafford. They hosted Manchester City in the Manchester derby on 19 November 2023, setting a new team attendance record of 43,615 during a 3–1 defeat. The final match of the season, against Chelsea on 18 May 2024, was also held at Old Trafford. United lost 6–0, setting a new team record margin of defeat. The result also meant United finished 5th in the WSL, the team's worst finish in the top-flight, having also set new team records for most league defeats and most league goals conceded.

On 24 December 2023, it was announced that Jim Ratcliffe and Ineos had purchased a 25% stake of Manchester United. While the Glazers remained majority shareholders, Ineos took control of football operations including "all aspects of women's football operations" and began a string of structural and personnel changes. On 20 January 2024, Omar Berrada was announced as CEO starting July 2024, moving from the City Football Group. He replaced interim CEO, Patrick Stewart, who had been in the role since November 2023 following the departure of Richard Arnold. A further change at boardroom level was announced on 22 February 2024 with Polly Bancroft intending to stand down as head of women's football at the end of the season to take the position of Chief Executive at Grimsby Town Matt Johnson moved to the role on an interim basis following Bancroft's departure.

== Pre-season and friendlies ==
Date	Opponents	H / A	Result F–A	Scorers	Attendance
28 August 2023	Leicester City	H	2–2	Fuso 10', Thomas 45'	0 (Note: Match played behind closed doors)
2 September 2023	Everton	H	1–0	Galton 37'	0
6 September 2023	Bayern Munich	N	2–3	Galton 15', Geyse 22'	0
13 September 2023	Liverpool	H	3–1	Toone (2) 10', 14', Geyse 68'	0
17 September 2023	Tottenham Hotspur	N	1–0	García 26'	0
5 January 2024	PSV	N	2–1	Riviere 34', Parris 90+4'	

== Women's Super League ==
=== Matches ===
Date	Opponents	H / A	Result F–A	Scorers	Attendance	League position
1 October 2023	Aston Villa	A	2–1	García 79', Williams 90+2'	12,533	5th
6 October 2023	Arsenal	H	2–2	Galton 27', Malard 81'	8,312	1st
15 October 2023	Leicester City	H	1–1	Le Tissier 67'	4,903	6th
22 October 2023	Everton	A	5–0	Malard 14', Parris (2) 58', 90+3, Williams (2) 77', 85'	1,990	4th
5 November 2023	Brighton & Hove Albion	A	2–2	Toone 78', Williams 90+8'	3,444	6th
12 November 2023	West Ham United	H	5–0	Geyse 3', Turner 42', Parris 45+1', García 88', Malard 90'	4,396	3rd
19 November 2023	Manchester City	H	1–3	Zelem 21' (pen.)	43,615	4th
26 November 2023	Bristol City	A	2–0	Miyazawa 50', Parris 55'	14,138	4th
10 December 2023	Tottenham Hotspur	A	4–0	Blundell 29', Toone 51', Malard 59', Ladd 84'	2,152	4th
17 December 2023	Liverpool	H	1–2	Toone 3'	6,303	4th
21 January 2024	Chelsea	A	1–3	Ladd 43'	20,473	4th
28 January 2024	Aston Villa	H	2–1	Parris (2) 7', 33'	6,347	4th
4 February 2024	Brighton & Hove Albion	H	2–0	Parris (2) 9', 64'	4,060	4th
17 February 2024	Arsenal	A	1–3	García 90+6'	60,160	4th
3 March 2024	West Ham United	A	1–1	Williams 4'	3,171	4th
17 March 2024	Bristol City	H	2–0	Naalsund (2) 9', 90+5'	4,254	4th
23 March 2024	Manchester City	A	1–3	Casparij 74' (o.g.)	40,086	4th
31 March 2024	Everton	H	4–1	Turner 57', Toone (2) 60', 65', Galton 90'	4,902	4th
21 April 2024	Tottenham Hotspur	H	2–2	Malard 13', Le Tissier 90+2'	4,697	4th
28 April 2024	Leicester City	A	1–0	Toone 83'	5,211	4th
5 May 2024	Liverpool	A	0–1		4,567	5th
18 May 2024	Chelsea	H	0–6		28,737	5th

=== Table ===
Pos	Team	Pld	W	D	L	GF	GA	GD	Pts	Qualification or relegation
3	Arsenal	22	16	2	4	53	20	+33	50	Qualification for the Champions League first round
4	Liverpool	22	12	5	5	36	28	+8	41	
5	Manchester United	22	10	5	7	42	32	+10	35	
6	Tottenham Hotspur	22	8	7	7	31	36	−5	31	
7	Aston Villa	22	7	3	12	27	43	−16	24	

Source: Women's Super League Table
Rules for classification: 1) Points; 2) Goal difference; 3) Number of goals scored.

== Women's FA Cup ==
As a member of the first tier, United entered the FA Cup in the fourth round proper.

Date	Round	Opponents	H / A	Result F–A	Scorers	Attendance
14 January 2024	Round 4	Newcastle United	H	5–0	Toone 28', Parris (2) 37', 55', Williams 71', Malard 90+1'	4,731
11 February 2024	Round 5	Southampton	A	3–1	Toone 8', Williams (2) 74', 82'	4,554
9 March 2024	Quarter-final	Brighton & Hove Albion	A	4–0	Turner 8', Parris 17', García 45+1', Naalsund 59'	3,701
14 April 2024	Semi-final	Chelsea	H	2–1	García 1', Williams 23'	6,876
12 May 2024	Final	Tottenham Hotspur	N	4–0	Toone 45+3', Williams 54', García (2) 57', 74'	76,082

== FA Women's League Cup ==
=== Group stage ===
Manchester United entered the League Cup at the group stage having been eliminated from the 2023–24 UEFA Women's Champions League in the second qualifying round. They were placed in Group B, the only remaining Northern group with four teams, alongside fellow WSL teams Everton, Leicester City, Liverpool and Manchester City. Finishing second in the group, Manchester United were originally in a position to qualify as one of two best second-placed teams following the conclusion of the group stage. However, an independent tribunal deducted three points Aston Villa on 29 January for fielding an ineligible player, awarding Sunderland with a victory and promoting them to group winners in Group A. Aston Villa progressed as a best-placed runner-up at the expense of Manchester United on goal difference.

Date	Opponents	H / A	Result F–A	Scorers	Attendance	Group position
9 November 2023	Everton	H	7–0	Parris (3) 28', 69', 78', Williams 30', Ladd 57', Geyse 84', Galton 89'	1,804	2nd
22 November 2023	Liverpool	A	1–0	Parris 41'	1,958	2nd
14 December 2023	Leicester City	H	3–1	García 2', Naalsund 20', Zelem 65' (pen.)	2,068	1st
24 January 2024	Manchester City	A	1–2	Parris 90+5'	4,818	2nd

Group B

Pos	Team	Pld	W	PW	PL	L	GF	GA	GD	Pts	Qualification	MCI	MUN	LEI	LIV	EVE
1	Manchester City (Q)	4	3	0	1	0	10	7	+3	10	Advanced to knock-out stage	—	2–1	2–2	–	–
2	Manchester United	4	3	0	0	1	12	3	+9	9	Possible knock-out stage based on ranking	–	—	3–1	–	7–0
3	Leicester City	4	2	1	0	1	10	7	+3	8		–	–	—	2–1	5–1
4	Liverpool	4	1	0	0	3	6	8	−2	3		3–4	0–1	–	—	–
5	Everton	4	0	0	0	4	3	16	−13	0		1–2	–	–	1–2	—

Source: FA Women's League Cup
Rules for classification: 1) Points; 2) Goal difference; 3) Number of goals scored; 4) Number of wins; 5) Head-to-head record
(Q) Qualified to the phase indicated

Ranking of second-placed teams

Pos	Grp	Team	Pld	W	WPEN	LPEN	L	GF	GA	GD	Pts	PPG	Qualification
1	D	Tottenham Hotspur (Q)	4	3	0	1	0	15	3	+12	10	2.50	Advanced to knock-out stage
2	A	Aston Villa (Q)	4	3	0	0	1	17	1	+16	9	2.25	Advanced to knock-out stage
3	B	Manchester United	4	3	0	0	1	12	3	+9	9	2.25	
4	C	Crystal Palace	3	1	0	1	1	5	3	+2	4	1.33	
5	E	Charlton Athletic	3	1	0	0	2	3	4	−1	3	1.00	

(Q) Qualified to the phase indicated

== UEFA Women's Champions League ==
=== Qualifying round ===
Having finished second in the 2022–23 Women's Super League, Manchester United made their UEFA Women's Champions League debut in the second qualifying round. The draw took place on 15 September 2023, with United drawing Paris Saint-Germain.

Date	Round	Opponents	H / A	Result F–A	Scorers	Attendance
10 October 2023	Second qualifying round First leg	Paris Saint-Germain	H	1–1	Malard 70'	4,827
18 October 2023	Second qualifying round Second leg	Paris Saint-Germain	A	1–3	Naalsund 47'	10,358

== Squad statistics ==
Numbers in brackets denote appearances as substitute.
Key to positions: GK – Goalkeeper; DF – Defender; MF – Midfielder; FW – Forward

No.	Pos.	Name	League		FA Cup		League Cup		Europe		Total		Discipline	
No.	Pos.	Name	Apps	Goals	Apps	Goals	Apps	Goals	Apps	Goals	Apps	Goals	Yellow card	Red card
3	DF	(England) Gabby George	3	0	0	0	0	0	1	0	4	0	0	0
4	DF	(England) Maya Le Tissier	22	2	5	0	4	0	2	0	33	2	2	0
5	DF	(Republic of Ireland) Aoife Mannion	2(2)	0	1(2)	0	0	0	0	0	3(4)	0	1	0
6	DF	(England) Hannah Blundell	21(1)	1	5	0	4	0	2	0	32(1)	1	4	0
7	FW	(England) Ella Toone	20(2)	6	5	3	2(2)	0	2	0	29(4)	9	2	0
8	MF	(Spain) Irene Guerrero	0(3)	0	0(3)	0	1	0	0	0	1(6)	0	1	0
9	FW	(France) Melvine Malard	11(8)	5	2(3)	1	0(3)	0	1(1)	1	14(15)	7	1	0
10	MF	(England) Katie Zelem (c)	22	1	5	0	2(1)	1	2	0	31(1)	2	3	0
11	FW	(England) Leah Galton	13(5)	2	3(1)	0	0(3)	1	2	0	18(9)	3	0	0
12	MF	(Wales) Hayley Ladd	7(4)	2	1(2)	0	2(1)	1	0	0	10(7)	3	3	0
14	DF	(Canada) Jayde Riviere	12(3)	0	3	0	2	0	2	0	19(3)	0	3	0
15	DF	(Wales) Gemma Evans	4(8)	0	1(2)	0	4	0	0	0	9(10)	0	1	0
16	MF	(Norway) Lisa Naalsund	11(6)	2	4	1	3(1)	1	2	1	20(7)	5	0	0
17	FW	(Spain) Lucía García	13(9)	3	4	4	4	1	1(1)	0	22(10)	8	4	0
20	MF	(Japan) Hinata Miyazawa	6(6)	1	0(1)	0	2	0	0(2)	0	8(9)	1	0	0
21	DF	(England) Millie Turner	22	2	5	1	2	0	2	0	31	3	3	0
22	FW	(England) Nikita Parris	16(5)	8	3(2)	3	3(1)	5	0	0	22(8)	16	2	0
23	FW	(Brazil) Geyse	13(6)	1	1(1)	0	1(2)	1	1(1)	0	16(10)	2	2	0
25	DF	(England) Evie Rabjohn	0	0	0	0	0(1)	0	0	0	0(1)	0	0	0
26	MF	(England) Grace Clinton	0	0	0	0	0	0	0	0	0	0	0	0
27	GK	(England) Mary Earps	22	0	5	0	0	0	2	0	29	0	1	0
28	FW	(England) Rachel Williams	2(19)	5	2(3)	5	4	1	0(1)	0	8(23)	11	1	0
34	MF	(Scotland) Emma Watson	0	0	0	0	0	0	0	0	0	0	0	0
36	FW	(England) Alyssa Aherne	0	0	0	0	0	0	0	0	0	0	0	0
39	GK	(Wales) Safia Middleton-Patel	0	0	0	0	0	0	0	0	0	0	0	0
49	FW	(Wales) Olivia Francis	0	0	0	0	0	0	0	0	0	0	0	0
55	DF	(England) Lucy Newell	0	0	0	0	0	0	0	0	0	0	0	0
58	MF	(England) Phoebe Chadwick	0	0	0	0	0	0	0	0	0	0	0	0
91	GK	(United States) Phallon Tullis-Joyce	0	0	0	0	4	0	0	0	4	0	0	0
Own goals			—	1	—	0	—	0	—	0	—	1	—	—

== Transfers ==
=== In ===
Date	Pos.	Name	From	Ref.
1 July 2023 (Note: Deal agreed 3 May 2023)	DF	(England) Evie Rabjohn	(England) Aston Villa	
1 July 2023 (Note: Deal agreed 25 June 2023)	FW	(Wales) Olivia Francis	(Wales) Pontypridd United	
6 July 2023	DF	(Wales) Gemma Evans	(England) Reading	
17 July 2023	DF	(England) Lucy Newell	(England) West Bromwich Albion	
18 August 2023	FW	(Brazil) Geyse	(Spain) Barcelona	
25 August 2023	MF	(Scotland) Emma Watson	(Scotland) Rangers	
6 September 2023	MF	(Japan) Hinata Miyazawa	(Japan) MyNavi Sendai	
14 September 2023	MF	(Spain) Irene Guerrero	(Spain) Atlético Madrid	
14 September 2023	DF	(England) Gabby George	(England) Everton	
14 September 2023	GK	(United States) Phallon Tullis-Joyce	(United States) OL Reign	

=== Out ===
Date	Pos.	Name	To	Ref.
27 June 2023	MF	(Wales) Chloe Williams	(England) Blackburn Rovers	
30 June 2023	DF	(Spain) Ona Batlle	(Spain) Barcelona (Note: Released, joined Barcelona on 1 July 2023)	
30 June 2023	DF	(England) Tara Bourne	(England) Sheffield United (Note: Released, joined Sheffield United on 2 August 2023)	
30 June 2023	MF	(England) Jade Moore	(England) Birmingham City (Note: Released, joined Birmingham City on 25 August 2023)	
30 June 2023	FW	(England) Alessia Russo	(England) Arsenal (Note: Released, joined Arsenal on 4 July 2023)	
30 June 2023	DF	(France) Aïssatou Tounkara	(France) Paris Saint-Germain (Note: Released, joined Paris Saint-Germain on 21 August 2023)	
3 July 2023	DF	(Scotland) Niamh Murphy	(England) Blackburn Rovers	
4 July 2023	GK	(England) Emily Ramsey	(England) Everton (Note: Released, joined Everton on 29 July 2023)	
27 July 2023	MF	(England) Ella Kinzett	(England) Sheffield United	
6 August 2023	DF	(England) Sasha McTiffin	(United States) Hofstra Pride	
10 August 2023	DF	(England) Emma Taylor	(England) Blackburn Rovers	
11 August 2023	FW	(Scotland) Kirsty Hanson	(England) Aston Villa	
26 August 2023	MF	(England) Rebecca May	(England) Derby County	
30 August 2023	DF	(Norway) Maria Thorisdottir	(England) Brighton & Hove Albion	
6 September 2023	MF	(Wales) Carrie Jones	(England) Bristol City	
11 September 2023	FW	(Canada) Adriana Leon	(England) Aston Villa	
12 September 2023	MF	(Norway) Vilde Bøe Risa	(Spain) Atlético Madrid	
14 September 2023	FW	(Brazil) Ivana Fuso	(England) Birmingham City	
14 September 2023	FW	(Scotland) Martha Thomas	(England) Tottenham Hotspur	
14 September 2023	GK	(England) Sophie Baggaley	(England) Brighton & Hove Albion	

=== Loans in ===
Date from	Date to	Pos.	Name	From	Ref.
15 September 2023	30 June 2024	FW	(France) Melvine Malard	(France) Lyon	

=== Loans out ===
Date from	Date to	Pos.	Name	To	Ref.
17 July 2023	30 June 2024	DF	(England) Lucy Newell (Note: Dual registration)	(England) West Bromwich Albion	
28 July 2023	30 June 2024	FW	(England) Eleanor Ashton	(England) Derby County	
8 August 2023	30 June 2024	MF	(Wales) Bella Reidford	(England) Burnley	
14 August 2023	30 June 2024	MF	(England) Grace Clinton	(England) Tottenham Hotspur	
24 August 2023	30 June 2024	FW	(England) Keira Barry	(England) Crystal Palace	
14 September 2023	21 October 2023	DF	(England) Jess Simpson	(England) Bristol City	
15 September 2023	5 January 2024	FW	(England) Alyssa Aherne	(England) Everton	
22 October 2023	30 June 2024	MF	(Republic of Ireland) Layla Proctor	(England) Huddersfield Town	
5 November 2023	30 June 2024	MF	(England) Holly Deering	(England) Liverpool Feds	
17 December 2023	30 June 2024	MF	(Wales) Mayzee Davies	(England) AFC Fylde	
19 January 2024	30 June 2024	GK	(Wales) Safia Middleton-Patel	(England) Watford	
24 March 2024	30 June 2024	FW	(United Arab Emirates) Fay Al-Qaimi	(England) Stoke City	
21 April 2024	30 June 2024	GK	(England) Jennifer Handy	(England) Liverpool Feds	
