= 2021–22 Manchester United W.F.C. season =

Manchester United Women
2021–22 season
- Co-chairmen: Joel and Avram Glazer
- Head coach: Marc Skinner
- Stadium: Leigh Sports Village
- FA WSL: 4th
- FA Cup: Fifth round
- League Cup: Semi-finals
- Top goalscorer: League: Alessia Russo (9 goals); All: Alessia Russo (11 goals)
- Highest home attendance: 20,241 (v. Everton, 27 March 2022)
- Lowest home attendance: 1,001 (v. Aston Villa, 19 December 2021)
- Average home league attendance: 3,567
Home colours	Away colours	Third colours
- All statistics correct as of 8 May 2022.

The 2021–22 season was Manchester United Women's fourth season since they were founded and their third in the FA Women's Super League, the professional top-flight women's league in England. The club also competed in the FA Cup and League Cup.

Following the resignation of Casey Stoney at the end of the previous season, Marc Skinner was announced as the new Manchester United head coach on 29 July 2021, having stood down from his head coaching position at Orlando Pride in order to take the job.

Having played at Old Trafford behind closed doors during the previous season due to the COVID-19 pandemic, the team played at Old Trafford in front of fans for the first time on 27 March 2022. They beat Everton 3–1 with a new club record 20,241 in attendance.

== Pre-season ==
Manchester United scheduled four preseason friendlies, with all but the Rangers game played behind closed doors. The matches against Championship side Liverpool and WSL side Aston Villa were both played at Carrington with the former broadcast live on MUTV. A week-long training camp in Scotland included a friendly against Rangers of the SWPL before a final friendly against WSL side Brighton & Hove Albion held on neutral ground at Loughborough University.

Date	Opponents	H / A	Result F–A	Scorers
8 August 2021	Liverpool	H	2–2	Galton 25', Hanson 26'
14 August 2021	Aston Villa	H	2–0	Thomas 4', Hanson 17'
19 August 2021	Rangers	A	5–0	Zelem (2) 8', 51', Staniforth 33', Hanson 74', Galton 77'
28 August 2021	Brighton & Hove Albion	N	1–1	Zelem

== FA Women's Super League ==
=== Matches ===
Date	Opponents	H / A	Result F–A	Scorers	Attendance	League position
3 September 2021	Reading	H	2–0	Hanson 39', Batlle 54'	2,111	1st
12 September 2021	Leicester City	A	3–1	Toone 36', Thorisdottir 47', Thomas 71'	4,473	3rd
26 September 2021	Chelsea	H	1–6	Russo 48'	2,197	6th
3 October 2021	Birmingham City	A	2–0	Galton 27', Toone 80'	650	4th
9 October 2021	Manchester City	H	2–2	Staniforth 72', Russo 75'	3,797	3rd
7 November 2021	Tottenham Hotspur	A	1–1	Russo 45+2'	1,308	5th
14 November 2021	Everton	A	1–1	Toone 10'	840	5th
21 November 2021	Arsenal	H	0–2		2,186	6th
12 December 2021	Brighton & Hove Albion	A	2–0	Ladd 45+1', Bøe Risa 69'	1,776	5th
19 December 2021	Aston Villa	H	5–0	Toone (2) 8', 79' Zelem 13' (pen.), Staniforth 50', Thomas 73'	1,001	4th
9 January 2022	West Ham United	A	Postponed due to COVID-19 outbreak at West Ham			
15 January 2022	Birmingham City	H	5–0	Zelem 12', Galton (2) 16', 18', Ramsey 45' (o.g.), Russo 71'	1,015	3rd
23 January 2022	Tottenham Hotspur	H	3–0	Bøe Risa 38', Ladd 42', Galton 62'	1,519	2nd
5 February 2022	Arsenal	A	1–1	Russo 10'	2,385	3rd
13 February 2022	Manchester City	A	0–1		5,317	4th
5 March 2022	Leicester City	H	4–0	Thomas 17', Russo 30', Zelem (2) 59', 63'	1,103	3rd
12 March 2022	Reading	A	3–1	Galton (2) 5', 25', Russo 43'	1,371	3rd
16 March 2022	West Ham United	A	1–1	Toone 54'	1,425	3rd
27 March 2022	Everton	H	3–1	Russo (2) 35', 84', Zelem 54' (pen.)	20,241	3rd
3 April 2022	Brighton & Hove Albion	H	1–0	Galton 68'	1,524	3rd
24 April 2022	Aston Villa	A	0–0		941	3rd
1 May 2022	West Ham United	H	3–0	Thomas 12', Fisk 20' (o.g.), Galton 49'	2,546	3rd
8 May 2022	Chelsea	A	2–4	Thomas 13', Toone 25'	4,378	4th

=== Table ===
Pos	Team	Pld	W	D	L	GF	GA	GD	Pts	Qualification or relegation
2	Arsenal	22	17	4	1	65	10	+55	55	Qualification for the Champions League second round
3	Manchester City	22	15	2	5	60	22	+38	47	Qualification for the Champions League first round
4	Manchester United	22	12	6	4	45	22	+23	42	
5	Tottenham Hotspur	22	9	5	8	24	23	+1	32	
6	West Ham United	22	7	6	9	23	33	−10	27	

Source: FA WSL
Rules for classification: 1) Points; 2) Goal difference; 3) Number of goals scored.

== Women's FA Cup ==
As a member of the first tier, United entered the FA Cup in the fourth round proper. They were drawn away to third-division Bridgwater United, winning 2–0 in front of a sellout club-record crowd of 2,500. For the fifth round proper, United were drawn against Manchester City for the fifth time in the last six cup competitions. United had most recently beaten City in their last cup meeting, 2–1 in this season's League Cup.

Date	Round	Opponents	H / A	Result F–A	Scorers	Attendance
30 January 2022	Round 4	Bridgwater United	A	2–0	Buxton 17' (o.g.), Toone 81'	2,500
27 February 2022	Round 5	Manchester City	H	1–4	Zelem 13'	2,335

== FA Women's League Cup ==
=== Group stage ===
As a team not qualified for the group stage of the Champions League, Manchester United entered the League Cup at the group stage. They were drawn into Group B, one of two Northern section groups, alongside fellow WSL clubs Everton and Leicester City, and Championship side Durham. Because Manchester City were knocked out of the Champions League during the qualifying rounds, they belatedly entered the League Cup group stage after the draw was made instead of receiving a bye and were placed alongside United in Group B as the only remaining Northern group with four teams.

Date	Opponents	H / A	Result F–A	Scorers	Attendance	Group position
14 October 2021	Durham	A	2–2 (5–3 p)	Fuso 35', Toone 73'	1,468	2nd
17 November 2021	Manchester City	H	2–1	Fuso 30', Batlle 82'	2,369	2nd
5 December 2021	Leicester City	H	2–2 (3–4 p)	Russo 47', Zelem 80'	839	2nd
15 December 2021	Everton	A	2–0	D. Turner 20' (o.g.), Thomas 23'	672	2nd

Group B

Pos	Team	Pld	W	WPEN	LPEN	L	GF	GA	GD	Pts	Qualification	MCI	MNU	EVE	LEI	DUR
1	Manchester City	4	3	0	0	1	14	3	+11	9	Advances to knock-out stage	—	—	5–1	—	3–0
2	Manchester United	4	2	1	1	0	8	5	+3	9	Possible knock-out stage based on ranking	2–1	—	—	2–2	—
3	Everton	4	2	0	0	2	5	8	−3	6		—	0–2	—	—	1–0
4	Leicester City	4	1	1	0	2	5	11	−6	5		0–5	—	1–3	—	—
5	Durham	4	0	0	1	3	3	8	−5	1		—	2–2	—	1–2	—

Source: thefa.com
Rules for classification: 1) Points; 2) Goal difference; 3) Number of goals scored; 4) Number of wins; 5) Head-to-head record

Ranking of second-placed teams

Pos	Grp	Team	Pld	W	WPEN	LPEN	L	GF	GA	GD	Pts	PPG	Qualification
1	B	Manchester United	4	2	1	1	0	8	5	+3	9	2.25	Advances to knock-out stage
2	C	Charlton Athletic	3	2	0	0	1	8	2	+6	6	2.00	
3	A	Sunderland	4	1	2	0	1	3	9	−6	7	1.75	
4	E	London City Lionesses	3	1	1	0	1	3	3	0	5	1.67	
5	D	Reading	3	1	0	1	1	4	3	+1	4	1.33	

Source: thefa.com

=== Knockout phase ===
The draw for the quarter-final was made on 20 December 2021 with Manchester United drawn away to five-time winners Arsenal, the competition's most successful team. The teams had met once before in the League Cup when United were a Championship side in the 2018–19 season.

Date	Round	Opponents	H / A	Result F–A	Scorers	Attendance
19 January 2022	Quarter-final	Arsenal	A	1–0	Russo 85'	825
2 February 2022	Semi-final	Chelsea	A	1–3	Bøe Risa 32'	1,548

== Squad statistics ==
As of 8 May 2022
Numbers in brackets denote appearances as substitute.
Key to positions: GK – Goalkeeper; DF – Defender; MF – Midfielder; FW – Forward

No.	Pos.	Name	League		FA Cup		League Cup		Total		Discipline	
No.	Pos.	Name	Apps	Goals	Apps	Goals	Apps	Goals	Apps	Goals	Yellow card	Red card
1	GK	(England) Emily Ramsey	0	0	0	0	0	0	0	0	0	0
2	DF	(England) Martha Harris	0(1)	0	0(1)	0	1	0	1(2)	0	0	0
3	DF	(Norway) Maria Thorisdottir	17(3)	1	2	0	4(1)	0	23(4)	1	2	0
4	MF	(England) Jade Moore	0(3)	0	0	0	0	0	0(3)	0	0	0
5	DF	(Republic of Ireland) Aoife Mannion	12	0	1	0	6	0	19	0	0	0
6	DF	(England) Hannah Blundell	19(2)	0	2	0	4(2)	0	25(4)	0	2	0
7	FW	(England) Ella Toone	22	7	2	1	3(2)	1	27(2)	9	5	0
8	MF	(Norway) Vilde Bøe Risa	8(9)	2	0(2)	0	4(2)	1	12(13)	3	0	0
9	FW	(Scotland) Martha Thomas	9(9)	5	2	0	4	1	15(9)	6	1	0
10	MF	(England) Katie Zelem (c)	22	5	2	1	4(1)	1	28(1)	7	1	0
11	FW	(England) Leah Galton	20(1)	8	1	0	4(2)	0	25(3)	8	1	0
12	MF	(Wales) Hayley Ladd	12(2)	2	1	0	2(1)	0	15(3)	2	6	0
13	FW	(Brazil) Ivana Fuso	0(7)	0	1(1)	0	3(3)	2	4(11)	2	0	0
14	MF	(Netherlands) Jackie Groenen	12(4)	0	1(1)	0	1	0	14(5)	0	1	0
15	DF	(Republic of Ireland) Diane Caldwell	5	0	1	0	0	0	6	0	3	0
16	FW	(Denmark) Signe Bruun	2(3)	0	0(1)	0	0(1)	0	2(5)	0	0	0
17	DF	(Spain) Ona Batlle	21	1	1	0	3(1)	1	25(1)	2	3	0
18	FW	(Scotland) Kirsty Hanson	6(11)	1	0(1)	0	3(2)	0	9(14)	1	2	0
20	DF	(Scotland) Kirsty Smith	3	0	1	0	2	0	6	0	0	0
21	DF	(England) Millie Turner	4	0	0	0	3	0	7	0	0	0
22	GK	(England) Fran Bentley	0	0	0	0	0	0	0	0	0	0
23	FW	(England) Alessia Russo	19(3)	9	1(1)	0	3(3)	2	23(7)	11	0	0
24	MF	(Wales) Carrie Jones	0(3)	0	1	0	2	0	3(3)	0	0	0
25	DF	(England) Tara Bourne	0	0	0	0	0	0	0	0	0	0
27	GK	(England) Mary Earps	22	0	2	0	0(1)	0	24(1)	0	0	0
32	GK	(England) Sophie Baggaley	0	0	0	0	6	0	6	0	0	1
37	MF	(England) Lucy Staniforth	7(5)	2	0	0	3(1)	0	10(6)	2	2	0
38	FW	(Norway) Karna Solskjær	0	0	0(1)	0	0	0	0(1)	0	0	0
39	GK	(Wales) Safia Middleton-Patel	0	0	0	0	0	0	0	0	0	0
40	DF	(Scotland) Niamh Murphy	0	0	0	0	0	0	0	0	0	0
41	FW	(England) Keira Barry	0	0	0	0	0	0	0	0	0	0
Own goals			—	2	—	1	—	1	—	4	—	—

== Transfers ==
=== In ===
Date	Pos.	Name	From	Ref.
1 July 2021 (Note: Deal agreed 25 June 2021)	DF	(England) Olivia Moulton	(England) Bolton Wanderers	
20 July 2021	MF	(Norway) Vilde Bøe Risa	(Norway) Sandviken	
23 July 2021	DF	(England) Hannah Blundell	(England) Chelsea	
23 July 2021	GK	(England) Sophie Baggaley	(England) Bristol City	
26 July 2021	DF	(Republic of Ireland) Aoife Mannion	(England) Manchester City	
28 July 2021	FW	(Scotland) Martha Thomas	(England) West Ham United	
27 January 2022	DF	(Republic of Ireland) Diane Caldwell	(United States) North Carolina Courage	
27 January 2022	MF	(England) Jade Moore	(United States) Orlando Pride	

=== Out ===
Date	Pos.	Name	To	Ref.
21 June 2021	FW	(England) Jessica Sigsworth	(England) Leicester City (Note: Released, joined Leicester City on 16 July 2021)	
23 June 2021	FW	(Scotland) Jane Ross	(Scotland) Rangers (Note: Released, joined Rangers on 6 July 2021)	
24 June 2021	FW	(United States) Christen Press	(United States) Angel City FC (Note: Released, joined Angel City on 23 August 2021)	
24 June 2021	FW	(United States) Tobin Heath	(England) Arsenal (Note: Released, joined Arsenal on 3 September 2021)	
25 June 2021	DF	(England) Amy Turner	(United States) Orlando Pride	
23 July 2021	FW	(England) Lauren James	(England) Chelsea	
26 July 2021	DF	(England) Abbie McManus	(England) Leicester City (Note: Released, joined Leicester City on 27 July 2021)	
30 July 2021	FW	(England) Megan Hornby	(England) Blackburn Rovers	

=== Loan in ===
Date from	Date to	Pos.	Name	To	Ref.
27 January 2022	30 June 2022	FW	(Denmark) Signe Bruun	(France) Lyon	

=== Loan out ===
Date from	Date to	Pos.	Name	To	Ref.
6 August 2021	30 June 2022	GK	(England) Emily Ramsey	(England) Birmingham City	
6 August 2021	30 June 2022	GK	(England) Fran Bentley	(England) Bristol City	
28 August 2021	29 January 2022	DF	(England) Tara Bourne	(England) Sheffield United	
31 October 2021	30 June 2022	MF	(England) Rebecca May	(England) Billericay Town	
14 November 2022	30 June 2022	GK	(Wales) Safia Middleton-Patel (Note: Dual registration)	(England) Blackburn Rovers	
14 November 2022	30 June 2022	MF	(Wales) Chloe Williams	(England) Blackburn Rovers	
29 January 2022	30 June 2022	DF	(England) Tara Bourne	(England) Blackburn Rovers	
12 March 2022	12 March 2022	GK	(Wales) Safia Middleton-Patel (Note: Emergency goalkeeper loan on non-contract terms)	(England) Leicester City	
