= Ella Toone =

English footballer (born 1999)

Ella Toone MBE
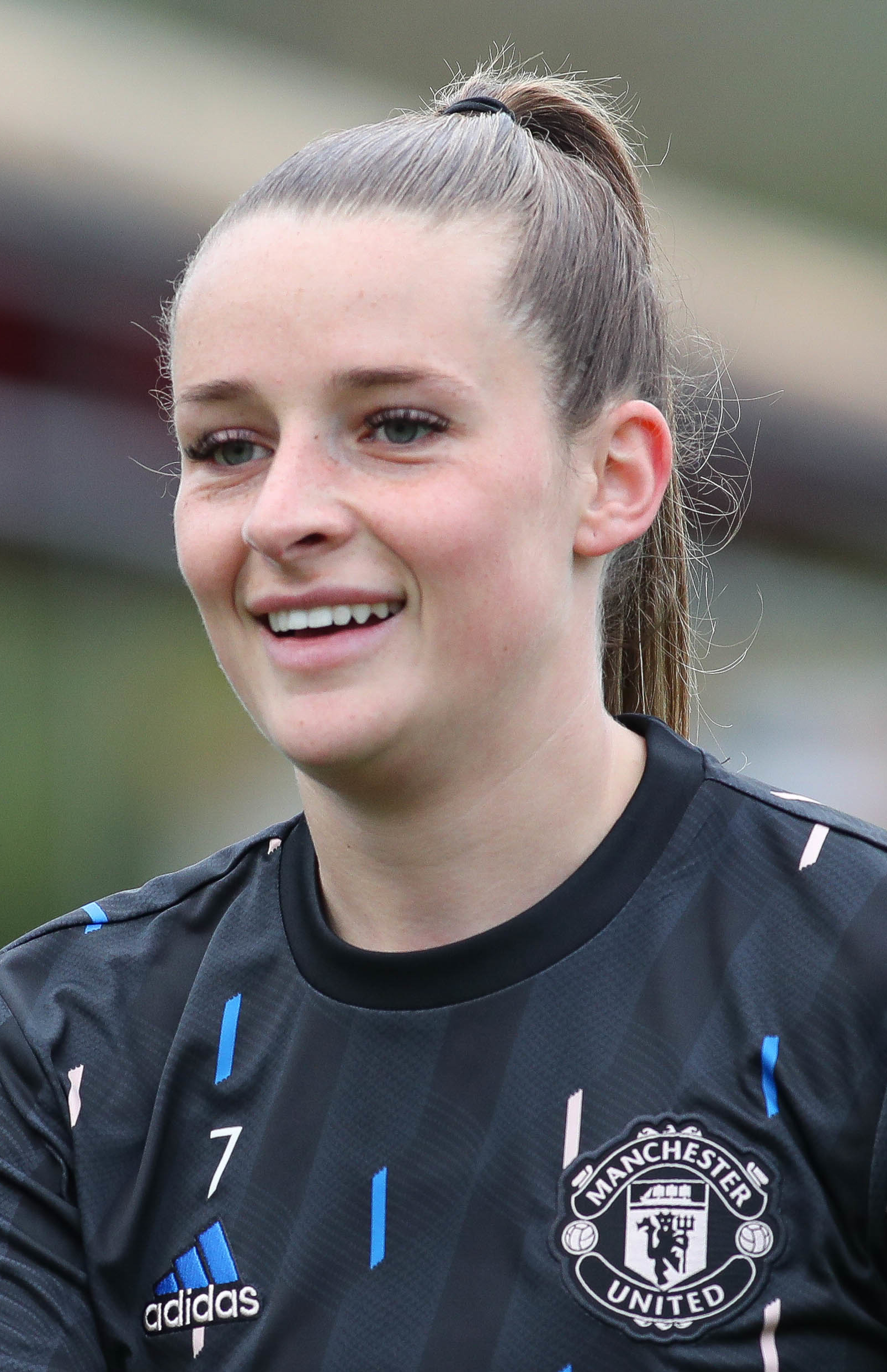
- Toone playing for Manchester United in 2023

Personal information
- Full name: Ella Ann Toone
- Date of birth: 2 September 1999 (age 27)
- Place of birth: Tyldesley, Greater Manchester, England
- Height: 5 ft 4 in (1.63 m)
- Position: Attacking midfielder

Team information
- Current team: Manchester United
- Number: 7

Youth career
- 2005–2007: Astley & Tyldesley FC
- 2007–2013: Manchester United
- 2013–2016: Blackburn Rovers

Senior career*
Years	Team	Apps	(Gls)
2015–2017	Blackburn Rovers	20	(13)
2016–2018	Manchester City	5	(0)
2018–	Manchester United	163	(49)

International career^{‡}
2015–2016	England U17	12	(4)
2017–2018	England U19	6	(5)
2019	England U21	13	(2)
2021–	England	69	(24)
2021–	Great Britain	1	(0)
Medal record
Women's football
Representing England
UEFA Women's Championship
Winner	2022 England
Winner	2025 Switzerland
UEFA–CONMEBOL Finalissima
Winner	2023 England
FIFA Women's World Cup
Runner-up	2023 Australia and New Zealand
- * Club domestic league appearances and goals as of 18:50, 22 November 2026 (UTC) ‡ National team caps and goals as of 5 June 2026

Ella Ann Toone (born 2 September 1999) is an English professional footballer who plays as an attacking midfielder for Women's Super League club Manchester United and the England national team. She represented England from under-17 to under-21, scoring her first Euro goal against Spain in 2022, with another against Germany in the Euro 2022 final, helping the team to win the European Championship.

Toone started her senior career at Blackburn Rovers in 2013, later joining Manchester City and winning the WSL in 2016. Since joining United in 2018, she has become their top scorer with most appearances for the club, has been described as a household name, as well as a key player by manager Marc Skinner. In August 2023, Toone scored her first World Cup goal against Australia in the semi-final, becoming the first England footballer to score in a quarter-final, semi-final, and final of a major tournament.

== Early life ==
Born in Tyldesley, in Greater Manchester, Toone began playing for Astley and Tyldesley Girls, where a plaque honouring her was installed at the club in 2022. She then joined Manchester United's youth academy at 8 years old.

Toone attended St George's Central Church of England Primary School and Fred Longworth High School. After leaving secondary school, whilst playing for Manchester United, she enrolled onto a BTEC Level 3 Extended Diploma Sport Science course at Wigan and Leigh College.

Toone has said her mother was a gymnast growing up, and on her father's side, family members were "all swimmers and water polo players". In school, she participated in a variety of sports, including table tennis, netball, cross country, and tennis, as well as winning several trophies in gymnastics.

== Club career ==
=== Blackburn Rovers ===
In 2013, at 14 years old, she joined Blackburn Rovers, prior to joining the first team two years later to score 13 goals in 20 appearances in the Premier League North. In the 2015–16 and 2016–17 seasons, she scored a total of 26 goals in 33 appearances for the club in all competitions.

=== Manchester City ===
Toone joined Manchester City in the summer of 2016 having previously been a youth at Manchester United for six years but moved on due to a lack of senior women's team. She continued to play with Blackburn in the National League on dual registration terms. In July 2016, she made her senior Manchester City debut as a substitute in an 8–0 win over Aston Villa in the Continental Cup.

Toone was nominated alongside four others for the FA Women's Young Player of the Year award in May 2018, an award eventually won by Beth Mead.

=== Manchester United ===
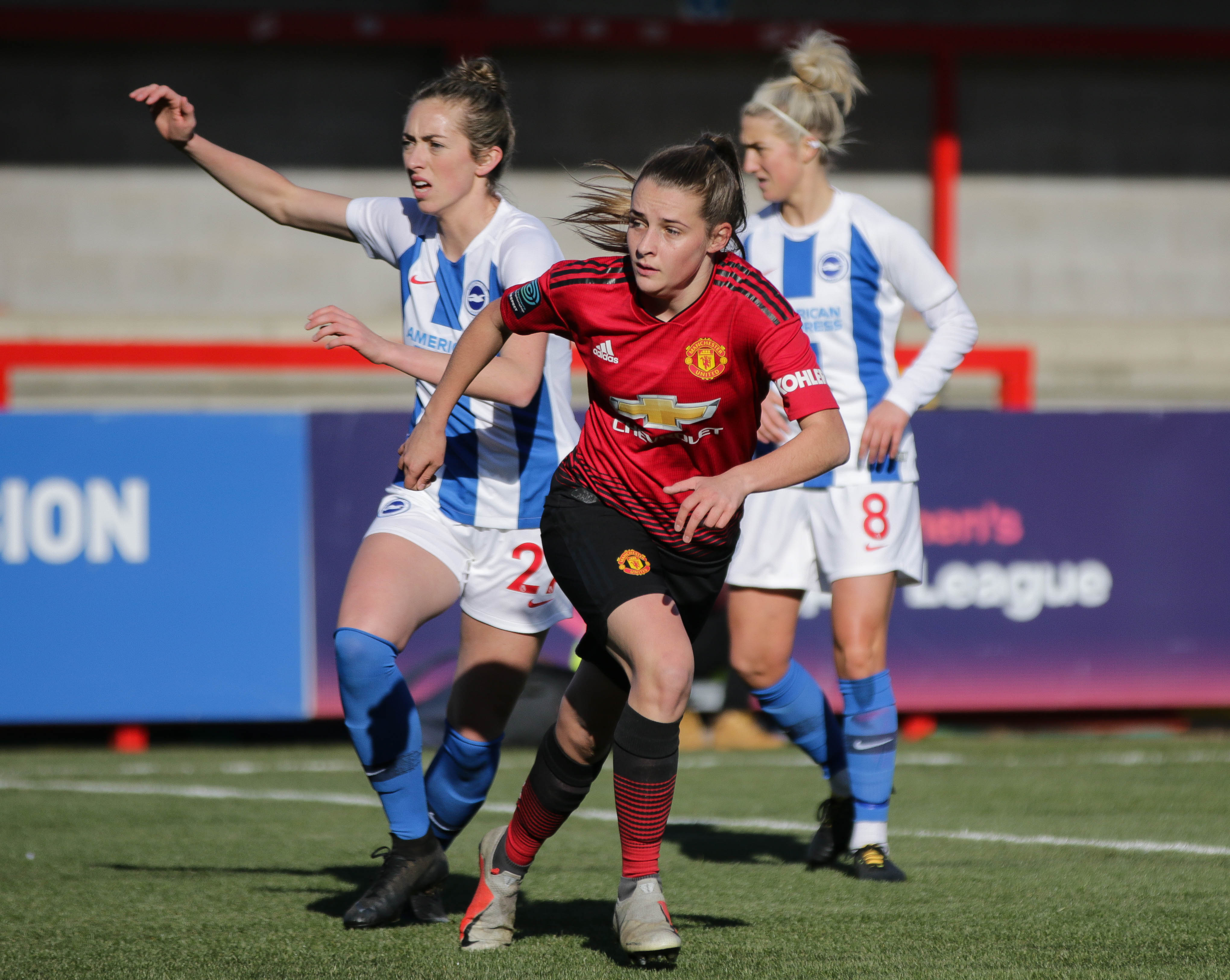
Toone (centre) playing for Manchester United against Brighton & Hove Albion in 2019.

==== 2018–19 ====
In July 2018, Toone joined Manchester United for their inaugural season in the FA Women's Championship for the 2018–19 season, one of seven players to return to the senior side having played for the club at youth level. She made her competitive debut for Manchester United, as a half-time substitute for Mollie Green, in a 1–0 League Cup victory against Liverpool on 19 August. On 9 September, she scored her first senior goal, on her league debut, in United's opening game of the 2018–19 season, a 12–0 win away to Aston Villa. She was voted FA Women's Championship player of the month for February 2019, having scored five goals in United's two league games, with four of them scored against Leicester City on 13 February. By 24 March 2019, she had scored 7 consecutive goals in league matches, breaking the club record for most consecutive goals scored by an individual player, later equalled by Jessica Sigsworth.

==== 2019–20 ====
In the 2019–20 season, Toone scored five goals in a League Cup group stage game as United beat Leicester City 11–1 on 21 November 2019, equalling the club record set by Sigsworth the previous season, as well as setting the record for most hat-tricks for the club with her second hat-trick.

==== 2020–21 ====
Ahead of the 2020–21 season, Toone signed a new two-year contract with an option for a third. Toone finished the season as United's top goal scorer, with ten goals in all competitions, as well as five assists.

==== 2021–22 ====
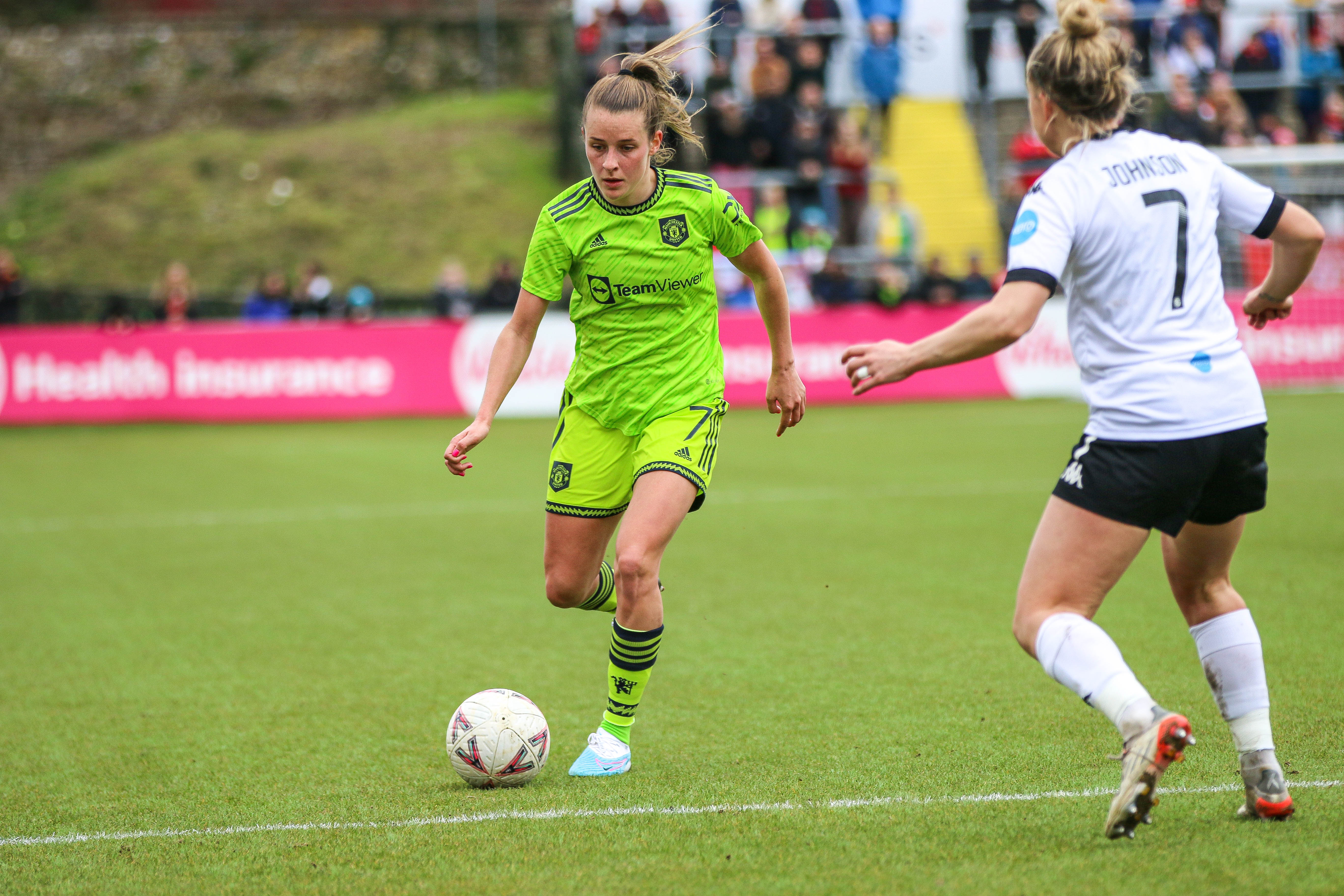
Toone (left) playing for Manchester United against Lewes in 2023.

In the 2021–22 season, Toone became joint top assist provider alongside Beth Mead and Vivianne Miedema, providing 8 assists, as well as scoring 7 goals. On 20 November 2021, it was announced that Toone had signed a new contract until June 2025. She became WSL Player of the Month in December, playing every minute of Manchester United's WSL games that month. A fan favourite, Toone was awarded club Player of the Year for the season with 35% of the vote, as the first player to reach 100 appearances for the club, as well as nominated PFA Young Player of the Year, the award was later won by Lauren Hemp.

==== 2022–23 ====
On 10 November 2022, Toone signed a further contract extension until June 2026. In the 2022–23 season, Toone provided 8 assists and scored 3 goals, helping United to finish second place in the WSL, and qualifying for the Champions League second round for the first time in the club's history. In February 2023, Toone had a red card and three-match ban overturned, after being sent off for pushing Tottenham's Eveliina Summanen. Summanen was later charged with simulation and deceiving officials over the incident by the FA, and given a two-match ban.

==== 2023–24 ====
I always want to contribute goals and assists, it's what I pride myself on as a No.10. It was quite difficult having a few games without them but I just had to make sure I was not putting too much pressure on myself to force things. I always set myself targets [before a season] but this term I've learned I can't think about them too much.

— Ella Toone, December 2023

External video
- 'What a hit' – Watch Toone's Wembley pearler from all angles, Manchester United Women's Goal of the Season against Tottenham in the FA Cup Final, from BBC Sport, 12 May 2024

On 10 October 2023, Toone played her first Champions League game against PSG, describing it as an "unbelievable feeling". United were subsequently defeated 3–1 in the return leg with Toone hitting the post. On 5 November, during the 2023–2024 season, Toone ended her year-long club "goal drought", described as a "gradual decline" by Manchester Evening News, by scoring a stunning goal against Brighton in a 2–2 draw. The goal was subsequently nominated as WSL Goal of the Month, an award later won by Rachel Daly. Considered a key player for the team, in November 2023, Marc Skinner has described her class as "permanent".

Toone was voted Manchester United Women's Player of the Month for December 2023 with 62% of the fan vote, as well as for January 2024 with 49% of the vote, after becoming the first United player to make 150 appearances for the club. The following month, In front of the record-breaking Super League crowd at a sold out Emirates Stadium, she provided an assist for Lucía García.

On 12 May 2024, Toone scored the first goal in the 2024 Women's FA Cup Final against Tottenham, and her fourth at Wembley Stadium, helping United win 4–0 and collect their first their FA Cup victory. The goal from the edge of the box was described as a "screamer" and a "wondergoal", and was later voted Manchester United Women's Goal of the Season by fans.

==== 2024–25 ====
Ahead of the 2024–25 season, Toone was named vice-captain of the club. In November 2024, she suffered a torn calf during training. This ended her run of 96 consecutive league appearances for United, the longest for an outfield player at a single club in the history of the WSL. United manager Marc Skinner confirmed she would be unable to play until January 2025 at earliest.

On 11 January 2025, having returned from injury after missing six games, Toone scored as a substitute against West Bromwich Albion in the fourth round of the 2024–25 FA Cup. The following week, on 19 January, she scored her first WSL hat-trick in a 4–2 away victory in the Manchester derby, resulting in four goals within five games since returning from injury.

==== 2025–26 ====
Toone made her 200th appearance for Manchester United during their 1–0 Champions League victory against Atlético Madrid on 16 October 2025, becoming the first women's player to reach that milestone.

In December 2025, having scored three goals and leading the league with five assists, Toone sustained a hip injury described by manager Marc Skinner as a "a bone stress response", ruling her out for an estimated six to eight or ten weeks. The following month, she signed a contract extension with United. The injury left her sidelined until April, resulting in her missing the 2025–26 League Cup final.

== International career ==
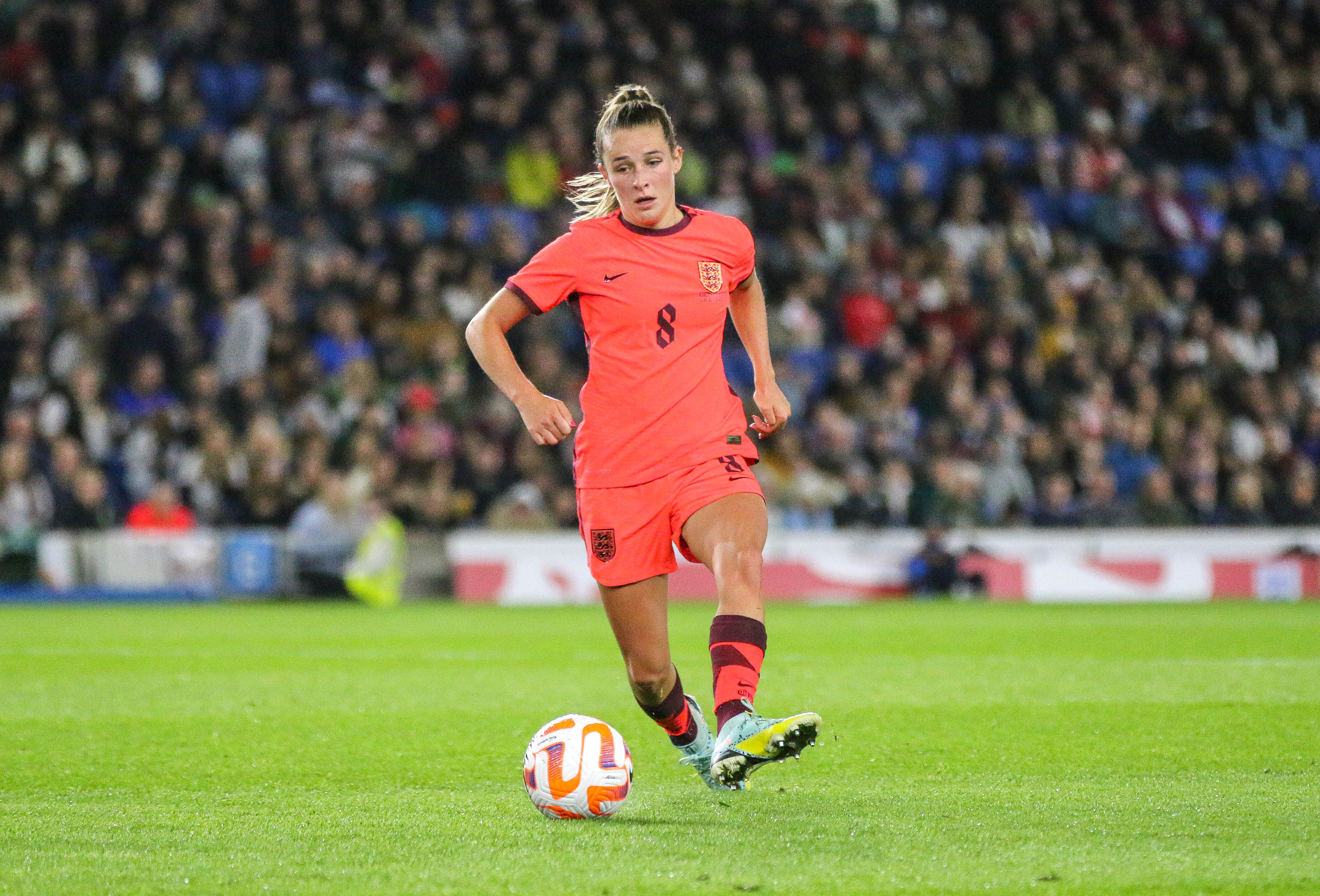
Toone playing for England against Czech Republic in 2022

=== Youth ===
Toone represented England at the 2016 FIFA U-17 World Cup in Jordan. On 17 October 2017, Toone made her under-19 debut in an UEFA Under-19 Championship qualification match against Kazakhstan, scoring twice in a 9–0 win. She scored 5 across the qualifying campaign as England finished second to Germany in the elite round. In June 2018, Toone was part of the 35-player shortlist to make the England under-20 squad for the FIFA U20 World Cup, but was ruled out through injury.

=== Senior ===
In September 2020, Toone received her first senior national team call-up as part of a 30-player training camp at St George's Park. She made her senior international debut on 23 February 2021 as a half-time substitute and scored a penalty in a 6–0 friendly win over Northern Ireland. She scored a hat-trick on 26 October 2021 against Latvia during 2023 FIFA World Cup qualification.

External videos
- Ella Toone gives England the lead in the 62nd minute, of the Euro 2022 final at Wembley Stadium, from RTÉ Sport published via Facebook, 31 July 2022

In June 2022, Toone was included in the England squad for UEFA Euro 2022. She appeared in every match as a substitute, and scored twice. Her first goal was an 84th-minute equaliser against Spain in the quarter-finals to send the game into extra-time, eventually winning 2–1. Her second goal was in the final to give England the lead against Germany in the 62nd minute. England won 2–1 in extra-time, winning the tournament. Since England's Euro victory, Toone has been described as an understated "big game player" and a "household name" by The Independent, as well as a "super sub" by Goal.com, after her goals and assist from the bench.

On 6 April 2023, at a sold-out Wembley stadium, Toone scored the opening goal in the 2023 Finalissima against Brazil, a game England won on penalties. On 31 May, Toone was named to the squad for the 2023 FIFA World Cup, becoming a regular starter in the tournament, after Fran Kirby's injury. After the first two group matches, according to Goal.com, her key metrics were down compared to that of the 2022 Euros, and analysed that she had not found enough space among the opposition, nor created enough goal scoring opportunities. In the semi-final of the competition, Toone scored the opening goal for England in a 3–1 win against Australia as England reached their first ever World Cup final. By scoring, Toone became the first England footballer, male or female, to score in a quarter-final, semi-final and final of a major tournament.

On 1 December 2023, Toone scored a dramatic winning goal in injury time as a substitute in a 2023–24 Nations League group match against the Netherlands.

Towards the end of 2024, Toone suffered a torn calf injury, meaning she was unable to play in the remaining England matches for the year.

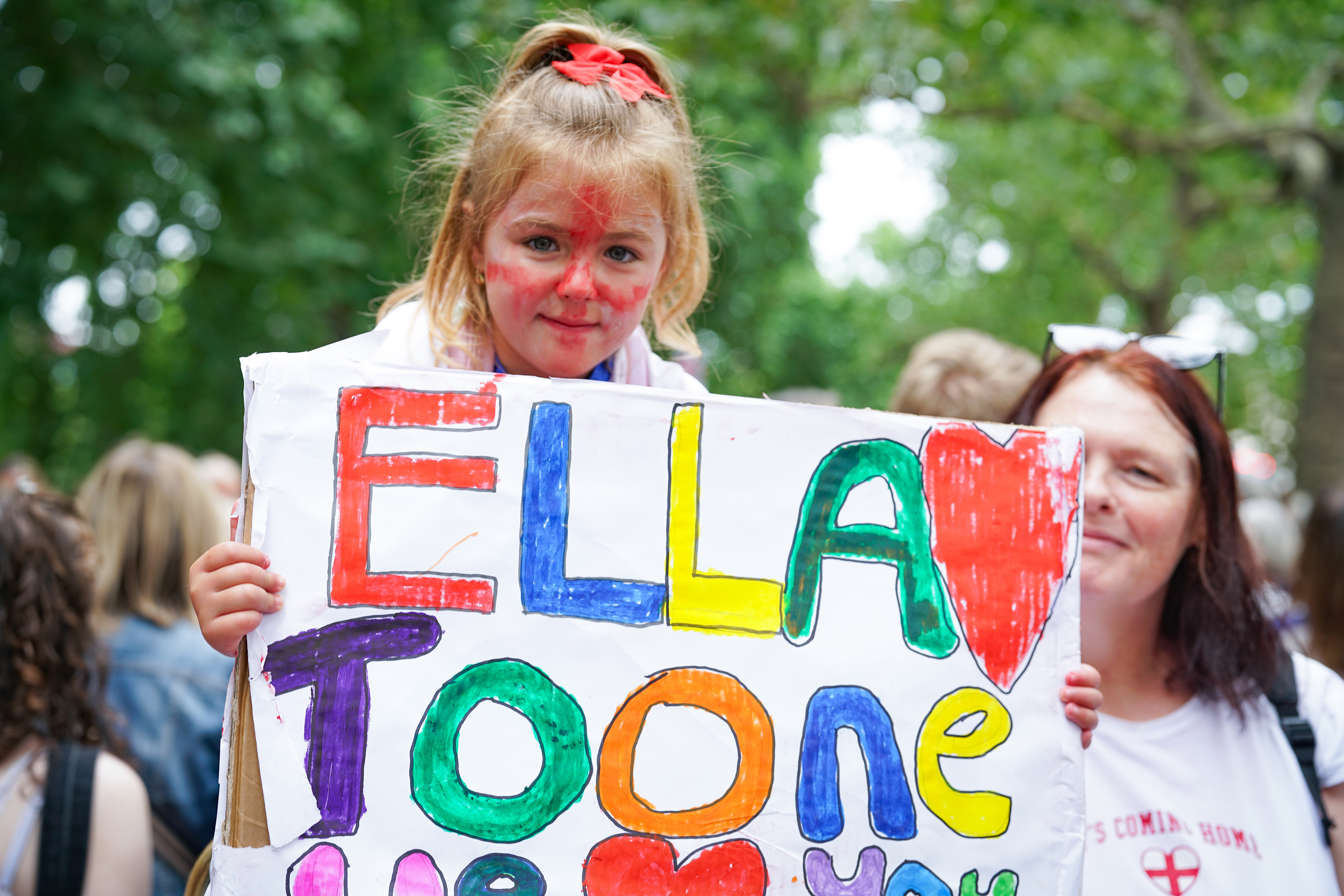
A young fan holds up a sign supporting Toone during England's victory parade for winning the Euro 2025

On 6 June 2025, Toone was named in England's squad for UEFA Euro 2025. She scored once, against Wales in the 21st-minute, a game which was eventually won 6–1. She started the final against Spain, getting subbed off in the 87th-minute. England won the final, winning the penalty shootout 3–1 and securing a second consecutive Euros Championship.

=== Great Britain Olympic ===
In May 2021, Toone was named to the Team GB squad as one of four reserve players for the delayed Tokyo 2020 Olympics. She was forced to withdraw from the pre-Olympic training camp held for the English players in June 2021 after testing positive for COVID-19. On 1 July 2021, the IOC and FIFA confirmed rosters would be expanded from 18 to 22 meaning the four reserve players would be available for selection to the matchday squad. Toone was named to the bench for the opening group game against Chile and appeared as a stoppage time substitute in the 2–0 win.

== Personal life ==
Ella Toone

YouTube information
- Channel: Ella Toone
- Years active: 2022–present
- Genre: Vlog
- Subscribers: 84.7 thousand
- Views: 7.53 million
- Last updated: 04 July 2026

Since 12 years old, Toone has been friends with former United teammate Alessia Russo, with the pair describing themselves as "best friends". Toone is in a relationship with footballer Joe Bunney and has a YouTube channel intended to provide a glimpse into her everyday life. The couple became engaged then married on 1 July 2026.

External audio
- The Tooney and Russo Show, BBC Sounds podcast with Vick Hope

In December 2023, Toone launched her own brand ET7, becoming the first England women's player to trademark her name, with the intention to launch her own football academy in 2024. In April 2024, Toone and Russo, in collaboration with Radio 1's Vick Hope, started the BBC Sounds podcast series "The Tooney & Russo Show", giving "an exclusive peek into the England camp like never before" and featuring "Tooney's unfiltered opinions". 90min has described her growing off-pitch profile as a journey towards becoming an "influencer footballer".

On the day of the 2022 Euro final, Toone's father, Nick Toone was diagnosed with prostate cancer. He died in September 2024, three days before his 60th birthday. The following month, 25 October 2024, during an international friendly against Germany, the England team wore black armbands as a mark of respect for her late father. She later talked candidly about the impact his death had on her play that season, saying, "I played on after that and probably wasn't enjoying it as much as I should have been. I would never have told myself that or admitted it because all I ever wanted to do was play football for him." On 31 July 2025, Toone said that her grandmother had died four days earlier, on the morning before the UEFA Euro 2025 final, in which Toone played the opening 87 minutes for the winning England side.

== Career statistics ==
=== Club ===
As of match played 22 November 2026

Appearances and goals by club, season and competition
Club	Season	League			FA Cup		League Cup		Europe		Total	
Club	Season	Division	Apps	Goals	Apps	Goals	Apps	Goals	Apps	Goals	Apps	Goals
Blackburn Rovers	2015–16	WPL North	5	3	0	0	3	2	—		8	5
Blackburn Rovers	2016–17	WPL North	15	10	0	0	10	11	—		25	21
Blackburn Rovers	Total		20	13	0	0	13	13	0	0	33	26
Manchester City	2016	WSL 1	0	0	0	0	1	0	0	0	1	0
Manchester City	2017	WSL 1	2	0	0	0	—		0	0	2	0
Manchester City	2017–18	WSL 1	3	0	0	0	3	0	0	0	6	0
Manchester City	Total		5	0	0	0	4	0	0	0	9	0
Manchester United	2018–19	Championship	20	14	3	1	6	0	—		29	15
Manchester United	2019–20	WSL	13	1	0	0	5	6	—		18	7
Manchester United	2020–21	WSL	22	9	2	1	3	0	—		27	10
Manchester United	2021–22	WSL	22	7	2	1	5	1	—		29	9
Manchester United	2022–23	WSL	22	3	4	0	2	0	—		28	3
Manchester United	2023–24	WSL	22	6	5	3	4	0	2	0	33	9
Manchester United	2024–25	WSL	18	5	5	3	1	0	—		24	8
Manchester United	2025–26	WSL	14	3	0	0	1	0	10	0	25	3
Manchester United	2026–27	WSL	10	1	0	0	3	1	—		13	2
Manchester United	Total		163	49	21	9	30	8	12	0	226	66
Career total			188	62	21	9	47	21	12	0	268	92

=== International ===
As of match played 5 June 2026

Appearances and goals by national team and year
National team	Year	Apps	Goals
England	2021	8	6
England	2022	19	9
England	2023	17	3
England	2024	9	1
England	2025	15	5
England	2026	1	0
Total		69	24
Great Britain	2021	1	0
Total		1	0

As of match played 29 November 2025

Scores and results list England's goal tally first, score column indicates score after each Toone goal.

List of international goals scored by Ella Toone
No.	Date	Cap	Venue	Opponent	Score	Result	Competition
1	23 February 2021	1	St George's Park, Burton upon Trent, England	Northern Ireland	6–0	6–0	Friendly
2	17 September 2021	3	St Mary's Stadium, Southampton, England	North Macedonia	1–0	8–0	2023 World Cup qualifying
3	26 October 2021	6	Daugava Stadium, Riga, Latvia	Latvia	1–0	10–0	2023 World Cup qualifying
4	26 October 2021	6	Daugava Stadium, Riga, Latvia	Latvia	2–0	10–0	2023 World Cup qualifying
5	26 October 2021	6	Daugava Stadium, Riga, Latvia	Latvia	6–0	10–0	2023 World Cup qualifying
6	30 November 2021	8	Keepmoat Stadium, Doncaster, England	Latvia	7–0	20–0	2023 World Cup qualifying
7	8 April 2022	12	Toše Proeski Arena, Skopje, North Macedonia	North Macedonia	3–0	10–0	2023 World Cup qualifying
8	8 April 2022	12	Toše Proeski Arena, Skopje, North Macedonia	North Macedonia	9–0	10–0	2023 World Cup qualifying
9	8 April 2022	12	Toše Proeski Arena, Skopje, North Macedonia	North Macedonia	10–0	10–0	2023 World Cup qualifying
10	12 April 2022	13	Windsor Park, Belfast, Northern Ireland	Northern Ireland	2–0	5–0	2023 World Cup qualifying
11	24 June 2022	14	Elland Road, Leeds, England	Netherlands	3–1	5–1	Friendly
12	20 July 2022	19	Falmer Stadium, Brighton and Hove, England	Spain	1–1	2–1 (a.e.t.)	UEFA Euro 2022
13	31 July 2022	21	Wembley Stadium, London, England	Germany	1–0	2–1 (a.e.t.)	UEFA Euro 2022
14	6 September 2022	23	Bet365 Stadium, Stoke-on-Trent, England	Luxembourg	8–0	10–0	2023 World Cup qualifying
15	11 November 2022	26	Pinatar Arena, San Pedro del Pinatar, Spain	Japan	3–0	4–0	Friendly
16	6 April 2023	30	Wembley Stadium, London, England	Brazil	1–0	1–1 (4–2 p)	2023 Finalissima
17	16 August 2023	37	Stadium Australia, Sydney, Australia	Australia	1–0	3–1	2023 FIFA World Cup
18	1 December 2023	43	Wembley Stadium, London, England	Netherlands	3–2	3–2	2023–24 UEFA Nations League A
19	27 February 2024	46	Estadio Nuevo Mirador, Algeciras, Spain	Italy	4–1	5–1	Friendly
20	29 June 2025	59	King Power Stadium, Leicester, England	Jamaica	1–0	7–0	Friendly
21	29 June 2025	59	King Power Stadium, Leicester, England	Jamaica	3–0	7–0	Friendly
22	9 July 2025	61	Stadion Letzigrund, Zurich, Switzerland	Netherlands	4–0	4–0	UEFA Euro 2025
23	13 July 2025	62	Kybunpark, St. Gallen, Switzerland	Wales	2–0	6–1	UEFA Euro 2025
24	29 November 2025	68	Wembley Stadium, London, England	China	7–0	8–0	Friendly

== Honours ==
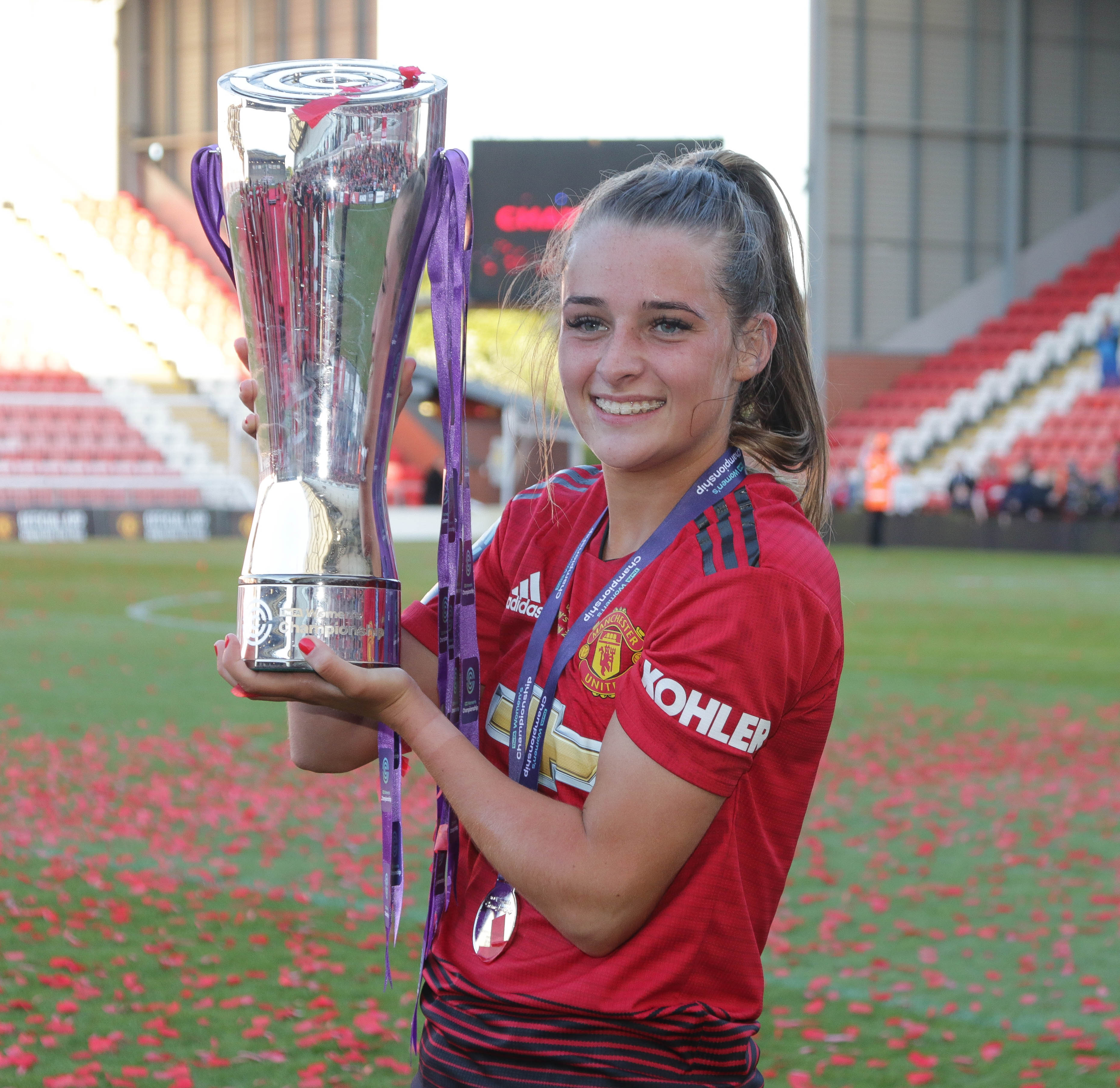
Toone holding the Championship trophy after winning the 2018–19 season with Manchester United.

Manchester City

- FA WSL: 2016
- FA WSL Cup: 2016

Manchester United

- FA Women's Championship: 2018–19
- Women's FA Cup: 2023–24; runner-up: 2022–23, 2024–25
- Women's League Cup runner-up: 2025–26

England U17

- UEFA Women's Under-17 Championship third place: 2016

England

- FIFA Women's World Cup runner-up: 2023
- UEFA Women's Championship: 2022, 2025
- Women's Finalissima: 2023
- Arnold Clark Cup: 2022, 2023

Individual

- Manchester United Player of the Year: 2021–22, 2023–24, 2024–25
- Manchester United Player's Player of the Year: 2023–24
- Manchester United Goal of the Season: 2023–24, 2024–25
- Freedom of the City of London (announced 1 August 2022)
- FIFA FIFPRO Women's World 11: 2023, 2026
- This is Manchester Awards Outstanding Contribution to Sport: 2026

Order

- Order of the British Empire : (MBE) 2026 New Year Honours

Records

- Manchester United all-time top scorer: 66
- Most appearances for Manchester United: 223
- First England footballer, male or female, to score in a quarter-final, semi-final and final of a major tournament.
