= Manchester United W.F.C. =

Professional football club

Manchester United Women
- Full name: Manchester United Women Football Club
- Nickname: The Red Devils
- Founded: 28 May 2018; 8 years ago
- Ground: Leigh Sports Village; Old Trafford (selected matches)
- Capacity: 12,000
- Owner(s): Manchester United plc (75%); Ineos (25%)
- Co-chairmen: Joel and Avram Glazer
- Head coach: Eva Olid
- League: Women's Super League
- 2025–26: WSL, 4th of 12
- Website: manutd.com/women
Home colours	Away colours	Third colours

Manchester United Women Football Club is a professional football club based in Leigh, Greater Manchester, England, that competes in the Women's Super League (WSL), the top tier of English women's football, after gaining promotion from the Championship at the end of the 2018–19 season. They won their first major honour when they lifted the 2023–24 Women's FA Cup, a season which also saw the team make their UEFA Women's Champions League debut.

== History ==
=== 1970s–2001: Unofficial teams ===
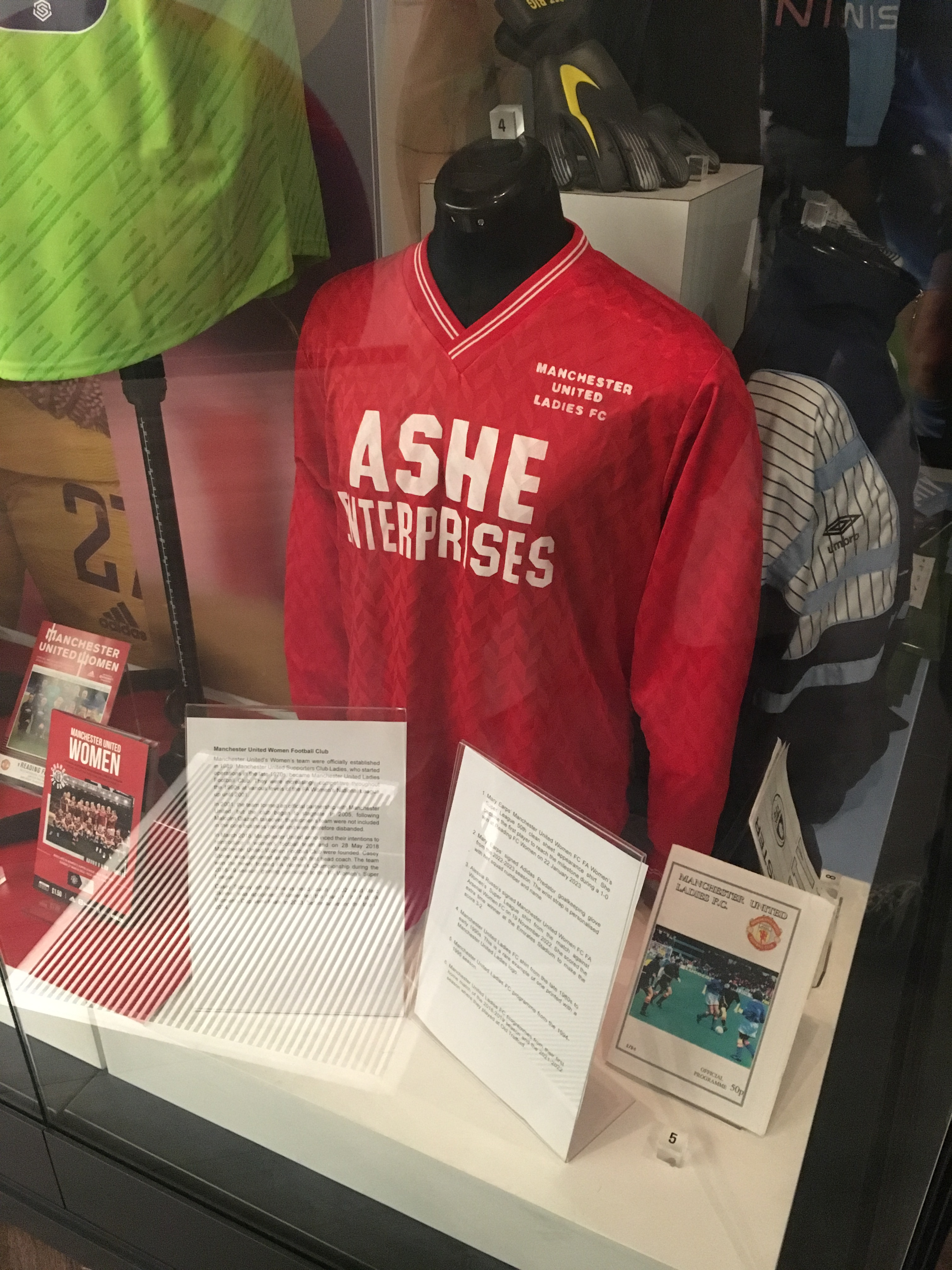
A shirt worn by Manchester United Ladies FC in the 1980s

Ratified in 1921, the ban by The Football Association prohibiting women's football from being played at any of its clubs was formally lifted in 1971.

An unofficial team called United Ladies of Manchester was formed circa 1970 by a group of Stretford Enders. They trained at the club's training ground, The Cliff, and arranged matches against other clubs' unofficial women's teams.

Manchester United Supporters Club Ladies began operations in the late 1970s and was unofficially recognised as the club's senior women's team. In their earliest form they were a charity team that played fundraising matches and played its first game in October 1977. In 1979, the team joined the Three Counties League under the auspices of the Women's Football Association and started playing competitively. With the league covering a large area, United's committee campaigned for a local league and in 1982 the Women's FA approved the creation of the Manchester & District League, of which Manchester United Supporters Club Ladies was a founding member and won the first three seasons. In 1989, the combined Manchester & Merseyside League, North West Women's League, and the Three Counties League merged to form the North West Women's Regional Football League. The league was spread across four divisions and included 42 teams. At the same time, the team approached Manchester United F.C. for support and more formal backing. The club agreed and the team was allowed to use the name Manchester United Ladies FC, matches were advertised in the club's programme and the team was allowed to train at The Cliff. The team became increasingly competitive throughout the 1990s at various levels of the FA Women's National League up until 2001.

=== 2001–2005: Partnership and disbandment ===
It's very disappointing. The progress of women's football can be really helped by professional clubs taking women's teams under their umbrella and it's a blow to the game that a great club like Manchester United will no longer be doing this.

— Ray Kiddell, FA vice-chairman, 2005

In 2001, the team formed an official partnership with Manchester United. However, the club began to stagnate with a string of successive mid-table finishes in the third division. The team were disbanded four years later, in 2005, shortly after Malcolm Glazer's completed takeover with the new regime deeming the women's team to not be part of the "core business" and unprofitable. A media spokesman for Manchester United also claimed the club wanted to focus on its women's academy instead of its senior team.

=== 2018–present: Current team ===
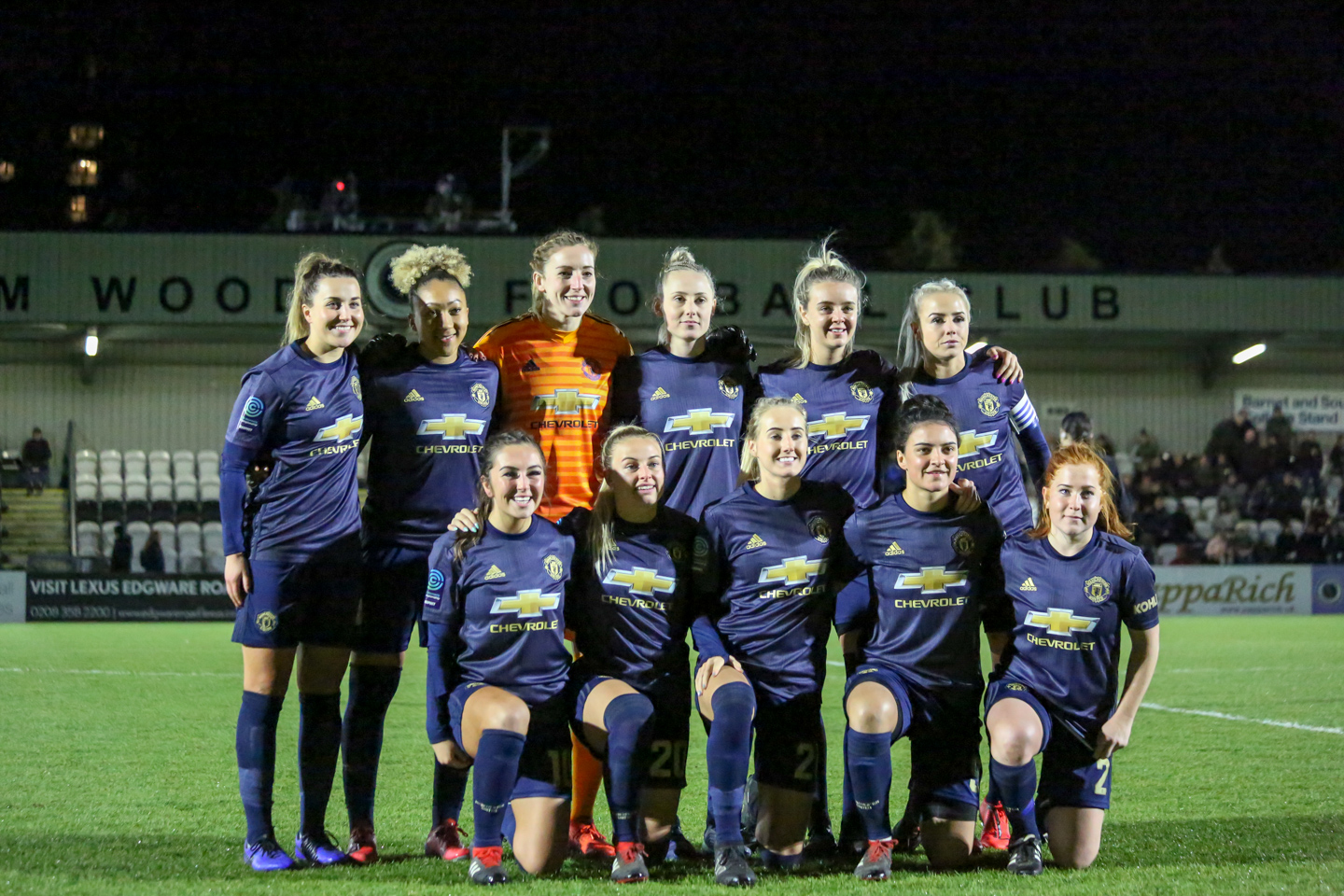
Manchester United in February 2019 before a match against Arsenal

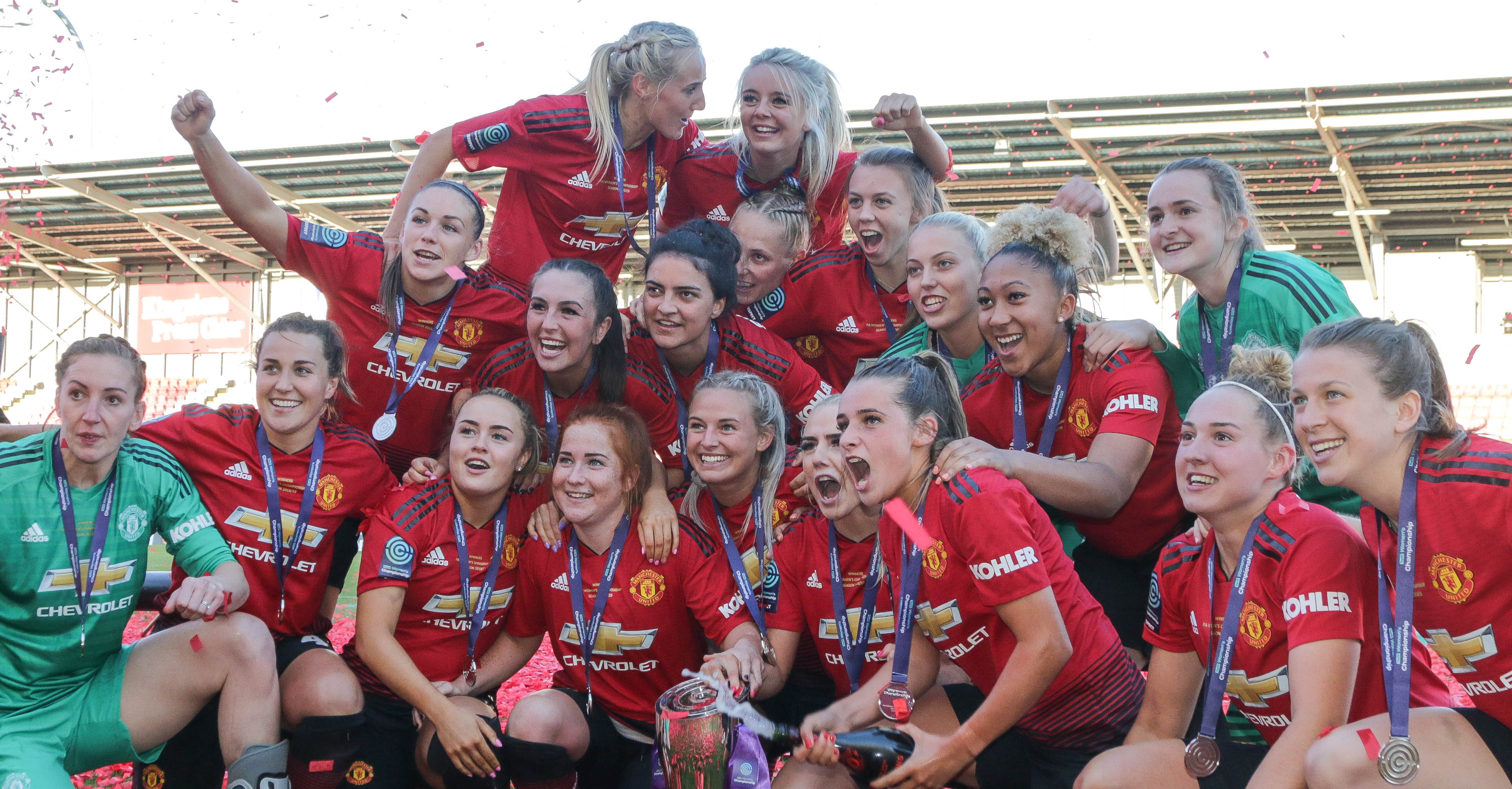
Manchester United celebrate winning the Championship title in their inaugural season

In March 2018, Manchester United announced their intentions to reintroduce a women's football team. Manchester United Women Football Club were founded on 28 May 2018, following the club's successful application to join the newly-formed 2018–19 FA Women's Championship. It marked the club's return to women's football after a thirteen-year absence; though the club's academy continued via the Manchester United Foundation, with the likes of Izzy Christiansen and Katie Zelem being produced by United's Centre of Excellence academy. Casey Stoney was appointed as the club's first head coach on 8 June, with their inaugural 21-player squad announced just over a month later.

The team's first game back was on 19 August 2018, where they won 1–0 in an away game against Liverpool in the FA Women's League Cup, with Lizzie Arnot scoring their first competitive goal in thirteen years. Three weeks later, their opening Championship encounter ended in a 12–0 victory away to Aston Villa. On 17 April 2019, United secured promotion to the FA Women's Super League following a 5–0 win against the same opposition. They clinched the FA Women's Championship title three days later following a 7–0 win at home to Crystal Palace. In May 2019, Manchester United were named FA Women's Championship Club of the Year at the 2019 FA Women's Football Awards.

The 2019–20 season was the team's maiden FA WSL campaign. The season opener was a Manchester derby, held at the City of Manchester Stadium. Manchester City won the match 1–0 in front of a then league record attendance of 31,213. United's first top-flight campaign was ended prematurely after the season was curtailed by the COVID-19 pandemic with the team awarded fourth place on a points per game basis. The last game was a 3–2 victory over Everton on 23 February 2020, with Leah Galton scoring twice and Ella Toone scoring once for Manchester United in the first game played at Everton's new Walton Hall Park stadium. In the FA Cup, Manchester United lost 3–2 to Manchester City in the fourth round, the first time they had lost in the first knockout round of a competition. However, they repeated their best League Cup finish by reaching the semi-finals for the second consecutive year, losing 1–0 to eventual cup winners Chelsea.

Manchester United Women played their first game at Old Trafford, against West Ham United, during the men's March 2021 international break. Manchester United won the game 2–0.

On 12 May 2021, Manchester United announced that Casey Stoney would stand down from her role as head coach at the end of the season. On 29 July 2021, Marc Skinner was announced as the new head coach on a two-year contract, with the option for a further year. Skinner confirmed in March 2023 that the 12-month extension option was triggered, keeping him at the club until 2024. Later that season the team reached a major cup final for the first time, losing 1–0 to Chelsea in the 2023 Women's FA Cup final at Wembley Stadium. After finishing as runners-up in the WSL, the team qualified for the UEFA Women's Champions League for the first time ahead of the 2023–24 season. United were drawn against Paris Saint-Germain in the second qualifying round and earned a 1–1 draw at home before a 3–1 defeat in the second leg ended the debut European campaign.

On 12 May 2024, United defeated Tottenham Hotspur 4–0 in the 2024 Women's FA Cup final to win their first major title.

For the 2024–25 season the club will play three games at Old Trafford, an increase from two which they had played in the previous two seasons.

== Ground ==
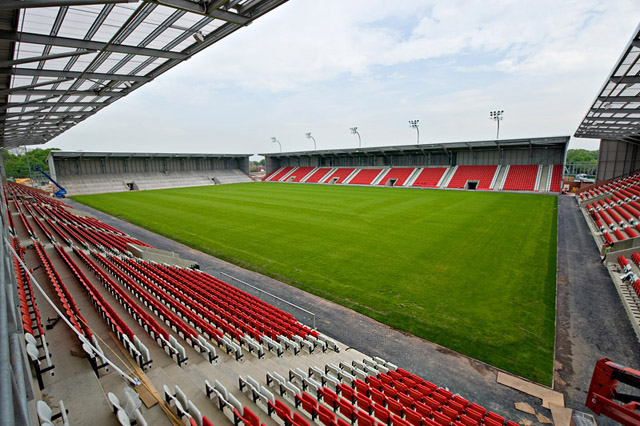
The Leigh Sports Village has been the venue for the majority of the club's home games.

Following the club's acceptance into the 2018–19 FA Women's Championship, it was revealed that the women's team would be based in Broughton, Salford at The Cliff training ground; subject to completion of redevelopment work. United were to play their fixtures at Leigh Sports Village until this was completed, however the stadium has become the club's official home ground as the return to The Cliff never materialised. Moss Lane served as a backup venue, during the teams early years, when Leigh Sports Village is unavailable. Ewen Fields has also been used as a contingency plan, hosting United's FA Cup fifth round match against London Bees in February 2019. In March 2021, it was announced that the women's team would play their first ever game at Old Trafford later that month against West Ham United. In March 2022, the team played for the second time at Old Trafford and the first with fans present, beating Everton 3–1 in front of a club record 20,241 fans.

== Players ==
=== Current squad ===
As of 2 September 2026

Note: Flags indicate national team as defined under FIFA eligibility rules; some limited exceptions apply. Players may hold more than one non-FIFA nationality.

No.	Pos.	Nation	Player
2	DF	SWE	Anna Sandberg
4	DF	ENG	Maya Le Tissier (captain)
5	DF	SWE	Hanna Lundkvist
6	DF	ESP	Andrea Medina
7	MF	ENG	Ella Toone (vice-captain)
8	MF	ENG	Jess Park
10	FW	NOR	Elisabeth Terland
11	FW	NOR	Celin Bizet Dønnum
12	FW	SWE	Fridolina Rolfö
13	MF	CAN	Simi Awujo
14	DF	CAN	Jayde Riviere
15	MF	SWE	Julia Zigiotti
16	MF	MEX	Rebeca Bernal
17	DF	NED	Dominique Janssen

No.	Pos.	Nation	Player
19	FW	SWE	Ellen Wangerheim
20	MF	JPN	Hinata Miyazawa
21	MF	SCO	Emma Watson
22	DF	WAL	Scarlett Hill
23	FW	SWE	Monica Jusu Bah
24	FW	GER	Lea Schüller
25	GK	GER	Janina Leitzig
26	DF	ENG	Jess Simpson
27	FW	ENG	Layla Drury
36	MF	WAL	Mared Griffiths
47	MF	ENG	Jess Anderson
55	DF	ENG	Lucy Newell
91	GK	USA	Phallon Tullis-Joyce

=== Out on loan ===
Note: Flags indicate national team as defined under FIFA eligibility rules; some limited exceptions apply. Players may hold more than one non-FIFA nationality.

No.	Pos.	Nation	Player
1	GK	ENG	Kayla Rendell (at Newcastle United until 30 June 2027)
39	GK	WAL	Safia Middleton-Patel (at Watford until 30 June 2027)

=== Player of the Year ===
Season	Player of the Year					Players' Player of the Year				
Season	Name	Nationality	Position	Notes	Ref.	Name	Nationality	Position	Notes	Ref.
2018–19	Katie Zelem	England	Midfielder	Inaugural winner		—N/a				
2019–20	Hayley Ladd	Wales	Midfielder			—N/a				
2020–21	Ona Batlle	Spain	Defender	First non-British winner		—N/a				
2021–22	Ella Toone	England	Midfielder			Alessia Russo	England	Forward	Inaugural winner	
2022–23	Alessia Russo	England	Forward	First to win both awards		Hannah Blundell	England	Defender		
2023–24	Ella Toone	England	Midfielder	First repeat winner and first to win both awards in the same season		Maya Le Tissier	England	Defender	First shared award	
2023–24	Ella Toone	England	Midfielder	First repeat winner and first to win both awards in the same season		Ella Toone	England	Midfielder	First shared award	
2024–25	Ella Toone	England	Midfielder			Phallon Tullis-Joyce	United States	Goalkeeper	First non-English winner	
2025–26	Jess Park	England	Midfielder	Second to win both awards in the same season		Jess Park	England	Midfielder		

== Coaching staff ==
=== First-team ===
As of 2 September 2026

Position	Staff
Head coach	(Spain) Eva Olid
Assistant coaches	(England) Dan Bale (Scotland) Gavin Beith (Spain) José Ángel Herrera
Goalkeeping coach	(England) Joe Potts
Strength & conditioning coach	(England) Ben Voyce
Head physiotherapist	(England) Amy Cranston

=== Higher management ===
As of 8 December 2024.

Position	Staff
Director of women's football	(England) Matt Johnson
For a full list see Management of Manchester United F.C.

=== Managerial statistics ===
Information correct as of 14 November 2026. Only competitive matches are counted.

List of Manchester United W.F.C. managers
Image	Name	Nationality	From	To	P	W	D	L	GF	GA	Win% (Note: Win% is rounded to two decimal places)	Honours	Notes
	Casey Stoney	England	8 June 2018	16 May 2021	77	52	6	19	213	60	67.53	1 Championship title	
	Marc Skinner	England	29 July 2021	3 August 2026	166	101	30	35	351	164	60.84	1 FA Cup title	
	Eva Olid	Spain	5 August 2026		14	9	3	2	35	16	64.29		

== Honours ==
- Women's FA Cup
  - Winners: 2023–24
- FA Women's Championship
  - Winners: 2018–19

== Seasons ==
=== Key ===
- QR2 = Second qualifying round
- GS = Group stage
- QF = Quarter-finals
- SF = Semi-finals

Champions	Runners-up	Promoted	Relegated

=== Season summary ===
Results of league and cup competitions by season
Season	League									FA Cup	League Cup	Champions League	World Sevens Football	Top goalscorer (Note: Goals in all 11v11 competitions (FA Women's Championship or Women's Super League, Women's FA Cup, FA Women's League Cup, and UEFA Women's Champions League) are counted.)	
Season	Division	P	W	D	L	F	A	Pts	Pos	FA Cup	League Cup	Champions League	World Sevens Football	Name	Goals
2018–19	Championship	20	18	1	1	98	7	55	1st	QF	SF	N/A	No competition	Jessica Sigsworth	18
2019–20	WSL	14	7	2	5	24	12	23	4th	R4	SF	N/A	No competition	Lauren James	9
2020–21	WSL	22	15	2	5	44	20	47	4th	R5	GS	Did not qualify	No competition	Ella Toone	10
2021–22	WSL	22	12	6	4	45	22	42	4th	R5	SF	Did not qualify	No competition	Alessia Russo	11
2022–23	WSL	22	18	2	2	56	12	56	2nd	RU	GS	Did not qualify	No competition	Alessia Russo	13
2023–24	WSL	22	10	5	7	42	32	35	5th	W	GS	QR2	No competition	Nikita Parris	16
2024–25	WSL	22	13	5	4	41	16	44	3rd	RU	QF	Did not qualify	RU	Elisabeth Terland	12
2025–26	WSL	22	11	7	4	38	22	40	4th	R5	RU	QF	RU	Elisabeth Terland	15
2026–27	WSL	5	2	1	2	5	9	7		R4	LP	Did not qualify			

== Reserves and academy ==
Despite not having a senior women's team for many years, Manchester United have continued to run a girls regional talent club up to under-16 level in accordance with FA regulations. The club's partner charity, The Manchester United Foundation, also works in coaching girls at all ages across the Greater Manchester region. Ahead of the 2019–20 season, Manchester United entered a full-time U21 team into the FA WSL Academy League for the first time, managed by Charlotte Healy. The club's development team had contested the WSL Academy Cup final against Arsenal the previous season.

=== Under-21 squad ===
Note: Flags indicate national team as defined under FIFA eligibility rules; some limited exceptions apply. Players may hold more than one non-FIFA nationality.

No.	Pos.	Nation	Player
41	MF	ENG	Tia Brookes
42	DF	ENG	Leah Roberts
43	DF	ENG	Lucy Robinson
44	GK	ENG	Evie Mitchell
45	DF	ENG	Aaliyah Pearson
49	FW	ENG	Martha Allington
50	DF	ENG	Pixie Bradley
51	MF	ENG	Niamh Mulcahy
52	MF	ENG	Holly Wilson
54	DF	ENG	Niamh Donelan

No.	Pos.	Nation	Player
56	MF	ENG	Emma Smith
58	FW	WAL	Poppy Holt
59	FW	ENG	Porsha Hoyland-Lau
60	FW	ENG	Issy Plano
61	FW	ENG	Emily Farnhill
62	MF	ENG	Jess Nwachukwu
64	GK	WAL	Abi Perrins
65	MF	ENG	Caitlin Driver
66	MF	ENG	Chloe Marchal
67	MF	ENG	Casey Leigh-Lamb

==== Out on loan ====
Note: Flags indicate national team as defined under FIFA eligibility rules; some limited exceptions apply. Players may hold more than one non-FIFA nationality.

No.	Pos.	Nation	Player
46	MF	ENG	Olivia Turner (at Huddersfield Town until 30 June 2027)

=== Academy manager history ===
Years	U21s Manager
2019–2024	(England) Charlotte Healy
2024–present	(England) Melissa Hamer-Brown

=== Academy honours ===
Awards

- **Women's Football Awards**
  - Grassroots Initiative of the Year (1): 2025

Under-21 Team

- **Professional Game Academy**
  - National champions (1): 2023–24
  - Northern Division (1): 2023–24
- **U21 Professional Game Academy Plate: 1**
  - 2025–26
- **FA WSL Academy League**
  - National champions (1): 2021–22
  - Northern Division (1): 2021–22
- **FA WSL Academy Cup: 1**
  - 2021–22

Under-16 Team

- **U16 Professional Game Academy Cup: 1**
  - 2023–24
- **U16 JPL Warriors Cup: 1**
  - 2025–26
- **SuperCupNI**
  - Girls Premier Section (2): 2024, 2026
- **Tesco Cup**
  - National champions (1): 2008-09
  - UK champions (1): 2008-09

Under-14 Team

- **Junior Premier League North West: 1**
  - 2025–26
- **SuperCupNI**
  - Girls Junior Section (2): 2025, 2026

Under-13 Team

- **Timperley & District JFL Development League: 1**
  - 2025–26
- **Timperley & District JFL Development Cup: 1**
  - 2025–26
- **Spring Cup: 1**
  - 2025–26

=== Academy graduates ===
The following is a list of academy players who have made senior team appearances. Bold indicates the player is still at the club.

- (England) Alyssa Aherne
- (England) **Jessica Anderson**
- (England) Keira Barry
- (England) Fran Bentley
- (England) Tara Bourne
- (England) **Layla Drury**
- (England) Gabby George
- (Wales) **Mared Griffiths**
- (Scotland) Kirsty Hanson
- (England) Naomi Hartley
- (Wales) **Scarlett Hill**
- (Wales) Carrie Jones
- (England) Rebecca May
- (Wales) **Safia Middleton-Patel**
- (England) **Lucy Newell**
- (England) Emily Ramsey
- (England) **Jess Simpson**
- (Norway) Karna Solskjær
- (England) **Ella Toone**
- (England) Millie Turner
- (England) Katie Zelem
